= Ric Lansing =

- General Hospital character
- Rick Hearst as Ric Lansing
- Portrayed by: Rick Hearst (2002–present); Nick Kiriazis (2007)
- Duration: 2002–2009; 2014–2016; 2024–present
- First appearance: November 8, 2002
- Created by: Robert Guza, Jr. and Charles Pratt, Jr.
- Introduced by: Jill Farren Phelps (2002); Frank Valentini (2014, 2024)
- Spin-off appearances: General Hospital: Night Shift
In-universe information
- Occupation: Attorney; Port Charles District Attorney (2004–2005, 2006–2008, 2015); Hostage negotiator (2007)
- Parents: Trevor Lansing; Adela Corinthos
- Siblings: Sonny Corinthos
- Spouse: Elizabeth Webber (2003–2004); Alexis Davis (2004–06); Nina Reeves (2015)
- Children: Molly Lansing
- Grandchildren: Irene Davis-Ashford (legal)
- Nieces and nephews: Dante Falconeri; Michael Corinthos (adoptive); Kristina Davis; Morgan Corinthos; Avery Corinthos; Donna Corinthos

Ric Lansing is a fictional character from General Hospital, an American soap opera on the ABC network. The role has been portrayed by Rick Hearst, who joined the series on November 8, 2002, and exited the series on June 25, 2009. Following a five-year absence, Hearst returned to the series on February 24, 2014, with a hiatus from June to December of the same year. He exited the role in July 2016. In July 2024, it was announced Hearst would reprise the role, with Ric returning on August 22, 2024.

== Casting ==
Rick Hearst originated the role of Ric in 2002. On June 14 and June 15, 2007, the role was played by Nick Kiriazis when Hearst had throat surgery. Hearst was taken off contract in April 2009, and left the show on June 25, 2009, to return to The Bold and the Beautiful as Whipple Jones III. On January 24, 2014, it was confirmed that Hearst would return to the series. His return scenes aired on February 24, 2014.

On July 25, 2024, it was announced Hearst would again reprise the role. His first day back on-set is July 29, with Ric's return aired on August 22, 2024.

== Storylines ==
=== Backstory ===
Before Ric was born, his father, Trevor, has an affair with Sonny's mother, Adela. Adela ends up pregnant, and Trevor sends her and Sonny to live in his vacation home located in Martha's Vineyard to prevent his wife from finding out about Adela. While pregnant, Adela accidentally falls down the stairs. Later, Trevor tells Ric that Sonny had done it because of jealousy. After Ric is born, Trevor tries to make her put Sonny up for adoption, but instead she leaves with only Sonny. Because of this, Ric blames Sonny for not having his mother in his life. Just prior to arriving in Port Charles, Ric attended Harvard Law School.

=== 2002–2009 ===
Five months after he arrived in Port Charles, Ric reveals to Sonny he is actually his half-brother. Through the years, Ric has constantly wanted to drive a wedge through Sonny and Jason's brotherly relationship. Upon arriving, he flirts with Carly Corinthos, as a way of getting to Sonny. He soon dates Elizabeth Webber, whom he marries in 2003. Elizabeth miscarries her child with Ric. Ric accuses Sonny of being responsible for the miscarriage and kidnaps Sonny's pregnant wife, Carly, keeping her hostage in a room and planning to steal the child. Carly escapes. Sonny pushes Ric down the stairs. Elizabeth divorces Ric and sleeps with Zander Smith. After Zander's sudden death, Elizabeth discovers she is pregnant. Ric agrees to raise the child. The two remarry but soon divorce due to Ric's obsession with Sonny. Elizabeth gives birth to Cameron Webber, who Ric never raises. Nonetheless, Ric has said many times Elizabeth was the first person he ever loved.

Soon after, Carly is kidnapped by Lorenzo Alcazar. Ric decides to help Sonny and Jason find her. Sonny allows Ric to become his ally. This was part of Ric's revenge plan. Ric later insults Sam McCall, Jason's girlfriend, leading Jason to assault him. Sonny stops Jason from going too far. Ric soon pursues Alexis Davis, Sonny's ex, and marries her. Ric bonds with Alexis and her daughter Kristina. He stands up as Kristina's Godfather on Christmas 2004. Alexis becomes pregnant and gives birth to Ric's daughter Molly on November 5, 2005. Ric helps Alexis discover that Sam McCall is her daughter. When Sam and Ric's respective relationships sour, they end up in bed. and Jason and Alexis walk in on them. Alexis divorces Ric in December 2006. Jason is charged with Alcazar's murder. Luckily for Jason and Sonny, Carly and Josslyn's evil uncle Jerry Jacks find evidence that frees Jason after the Metro Court Hotel hostage crisis where Ric befriended his brother's longtime best friend Robin Scorpio where he and Diane Miller were worried sick and concerned. Ric even tries to put Sonny's girlfriend, Kate Howard, in jail for six months as part of his revenge scheme. Ric's father, Trevor, comes to Port Charles and erases the charges. Ric tries to move on with Elizabeth, but she refuses despite his admission she was the only one he truly loved. Ric and Skye Quartermaine go to Nikolas Cassadine's Black and White Ball together, where he is impaled with a sword. When Ric needs a blood transfusion, Sonny donates his, although he was hesitant. Ric and Alexis agree to get past the events during their shaky marriage. Ric later goes to work for Anthony Zacchara and releases him from an asylum. Ric also gets Johnny Zacchara acquitted of murder, leading John's sister Claudia Corinthos to reward him with sex. Their relationship lasts until Anthony forces Claudia to marry Sonny. Ric continues sleeping with Claudia. She and Sonny become intimate. Ric later discovers Claudia's involvement in Michael Corinthos III's shooting. After months of taunting Claudia with the information, Ric reveals Claudia's secret to Sonny. Sonny, who doesn't trust Ric, asks him for further evidence and allows Claudia to continue to live with him. Claudia becomes pregnant, and Ric convinces Sonny the baby could be his. On June 25, 2009, Ric flees Port Charles and moves to Los Angeles, in the hopes of leaving Sonny, Claudia, and all his demons behind. In his final scene, he is seen entering an elevator and telling Claudia, "Don't worry about me. I'll be back," and smiling as the doors close. On July 20, 2009, Claudia contacts Ric, telling him Sonny is the father of her child. There is no need for him to return to Port Charles. Moments after hanging up, Claudia is run off the road and suffers a miscarriage months after the fire at General Hospital.

=== 2014–2016 ===
Ric returns to Port Charles in 2014 amidst an escalating mob war between Sonny and Julian Jerome. Having recently discovered that Julian's organization is being financed by an anonymous benefactor, Sonny suspects Ric of being Julian's backer. Ric insists that he is only in town to reconnect with Molly, upsetting Alexis when he sides with Molly, now a teenager, in an argument. Ric also reconnects with Elizabeth and asks her on a date.

After he was arrested for shooting someone because he was framed by an unknown criminal, his daughter Molly and half-brother Sonny visited Ric at the PCPD.

When it was learned that Julian had Ric framed as the man he worked for, Anna Devane arranged for him to stage his own death by having it appear he was shot dead by Nathan West in a fake jail break attempt. He then left Port Charles and was given a new identity.

Ric was later kidnapped from witness protection by Carlos Rivera under the orders of Johnny Zacchara. He was saved by Ric's new client Shawn Butler and later commissioner Jordan Ashford, Ric comes back to Molly unharmed.

He was appointed acting district attorney by Mayor Janice Lomax during the case of Silas Clay where Ric got to know Jordan Ashford.

He visits Elizabeth Webber at General Hospital after Jason and Sam visited Ric's client Shawn in Pentonville and the wedding disaster at the All-Saints Church.

== Reception ==
In 2004, Hearst won a Daytime Emmy Award as "Outstanding Supporting Actor in a Drama Series" for the role, at the 31st Daytime Emmy Awards. He won again in 2007 in the "Outstanding Supporting Actor in a Drama Series" category.
