= Marraccini =

Marraccini is an Italian surname. Notable people with the surname include:

- Dirty Martini (burlesque) (born Linda Marraccini), American burlesque dancer, pin-up model, and dance teacher
- Matt Marraccini (born 1981), American actor
