= List of General Hospital characters introduced in the 2000s =

General Hospital is the longest-running American television serial drama, airing on ABC. Created by Frank and Doris Hursley, who originally set it in a general hospital (hence the title), in an unnamed fictional city. In the 1970s, the city was named Port Charles, New York. The series premiered on April 1, 1963. This is a list of notable characters who significantly impacted storylines and began their run, or significantly returned, from the years 2000 to 2009.

== Sage Alcazar ==
Sage Alcazar
- General Hospital character
- Portrayed by: Eileen Boylan (2003); Katie Stuart (2003–04)
- Duration: 2003–04
- First appearance: November 5, 2003
- Last appearance: August 26, 2004
- Created by: Robert Guza, Jr. Charles Pratt, Jr.
- Introduced by: Jill Farren Phelps
In-universe information
- Occupation: Singer at l&b records
- Father: Luis Alcazar
- Uncles: Lorenzo Alcazar
- First cousins: Diego Alcazar; Lila Rae Alcazar

Sage Alcazar is a fictional character on the ABC soap opera General Hospital. She was portrayed by Eileen Boylan in 2003, and then by Katie Stuart in 2004.

Sage Alcazar arrives in Port Charles with one thing on her mind: revenge. A gun-toting Sage stalks Alexis Davis for days, waiting for the right moment to wreak havoc on her life, because Sage believes Alexis had murdered her father Luis in cold-blood. However, that right moment never comes for the obviously tormented teen. To receive attention, Sage jumps off the dock and into the river. Dillon Quartermaine jumps in after to rescue her, soon realizing it was just a stunt for attention. Dillon takes Sage back to the Quartermaine mansion, where Dillon's girlfriend, Georgie Jones, sees Sage hiding under Dillon's bed and gets upset.

Sage continues to pursue Dillon, and convinces her uncle Lorenzo to make Dillon her bodyguard. Soon after, Dillon is forced to take Sage out of the country to keep her safe. While away, Sage gets Dillon drunk and he passes out. When Georgie calls, Sage pretends she had bedded Dillon, but Dillon is able to convince Georgie it isn't true.

Dillon's mother Tracy returns to town, and tries to keep Dillon and Georgie from seeing each other. She promises Georgie she will make Dillon stop working for Alcazar if Georgie stops seeing him. Georgie agrees and breaks up with him for his safety. Heartbroken, Dillon falls into bed with Sage. A gleeful Tracy sets up Georgie to discover Dillon with Sage. Dillon tries to explain, but Georgie refuses to listen. Sage tells Dillon she had been a virgin and that their night together meant something to her. She is crushed when he says he wished it had never happened. She continues to pursue a relationship with Dillon, but he continually rebuffs her attempts to get close to him again.

Tracy's granddaughter Brook Lynn arrives in town having run away from home. Her mother Lois shows up to find her and her father Ned convinces them to stay and run their old record label L&B again. Lois hears Sage sing and has her sign a recording contract.

Sage doesn't get along with Brook Lynn very well and continually defends her uncle and his new relationship with Lois. But when a contest is announced to find the next big girl band, Sage groups with Brook, Georgie, and Dillon (dressed in drag) to try out for the competition. Sage is crushed to hear the group was only supposed to launch a future solo career for Brook.

When Brook holds a séance to communicate with her deceased great-grandmother Lila Quartermaine, Sage seizes her opportunity to scare everyone. With the help of her friend Trent, she makes it appear Lila's spirit is moving things around. Then she pretends she has been stabbed, and when the others find out, they yell at her. She yells back and taunts Georgie that Dillon still wants her. Georgie finally has enough and locks Sage in the basement freezer. When they go downstairs to get her out, they find Sage dead instead. Georgie blames herself for locking Sage in the freezer, and Tracy overhears her "confession." She calls the cops and eventually the real killer is found to be Mary Bishop, who meant to kill Emily Quartermaine and killed Sage by mistake.

Afraid Lorenzo would come after Georgie for locking Sage in the freezer, Dillon tries to fall on his sword for her. But, Lorenzo tells Dillon he was grateful for him being Sage's friend and for getting to know her. He gives Dillon a letter Sage had written for him but never sent. Dillon reads the letter to their friends, who realize they should have given Sage more of a chance.

== Cooper Barrett ==
Cooper Barrett
- General Hospital character
- Portrayed by: Jason Gerhardt
- Duration: 2007–08
- First appearance: February 1, 2007
- Last appearance: January 28, 2008
- Created by: Robert Guza, Jr.
- Introduced by: Jill Farren Phelps
- Spin-off appearances: General Hospital: Night Shift
In-universe information
- Other names: Three
- Occupation: Police Officer; Security guard; Criminal; Iraq War Veteran

Cooper "Coop" Barrett is a fictional character on the ABC soap opera, General Hospital. Jason Gerhardt originated the role on February 1, 2007 on a recurring basis. Gerhardt originally auditioned for the role of Logan Hayes, and invited to audition for Coop after making an impression on the casting directors. Gerhardt was eventually put on contract status. There was often speculation the character would have a relation to fan favorite Brenda Barrett (Vanessa Marcil), but it is eventually stated on-screen there is no relation. Gerhardt appeared on the General Hospital spin-off General Hospital: Night Shift as Cooper in 2007. He was let go from the series in 2008 and the character was killed off.

Cooper arrives in Port Charles in February 2007 as "Three," one of the seven assailants that take the Metro Court Hotel hostage. He bonds with Maxie Jones (Kirsten Storms) while they are trapped in the hotel vault during the crisis. After the hotel explodes, Maxie sneaks Coop out and hides his involvement. She helps him get a job working security until Sonny Corinthos (Maurice Benard) finds out he was one of the hostage takers. Sonny coerces Coop into becoming a cop at the PCPD to feed him information. Cooper and Maxie begin dating, but face tough times when Maxie cheats on him with Logan Hayes. Cooper is suspected to be the Text Message Killer, and when he is found dead in January 2008, it is initially believed to have been a suicidal hanging. It is later revealed Cooper was murdered by the real killer, Diego Alcazar.

== Alison Barrington ==
Alison Barrington
- General Hospital character
- Portrayed by: Erin Hershey Presley
- Duration: 2000–03; 2013
- First appearance: March 14, 2000
- Last appearance: February 28, 2013
- Created by: Karen Harris
- Introduced by: Julie Hanan Carruthers (2000); Wendy Riche (2000); Frank Valentini (2013)
- Spin-off appearances: Port Charles
In-universe information
- Occupation: Co-Owner of Gym/Juice Bar; Model; Waitress at The Recovery Room; Proprietor of The Pink Rose; Assistant at The Bike Shop; Volunteer at General Hospital
- Father: Malcolm Barrington
- Mother: Elizabeth Barrington
- Husband: Rafe Kovich (2002, 2003–13)
- Sons: Rafe Kovich, Jr.
- Grandparents: Amanda Barrington
- Uncles: Derek Barrington
- First cousins: Mike Webber

Alison Barrington is a fictional character on the ABC soap opera, Port Charles, a spin-off of General Hospital. She was portrayed by Erin Hershey Presley from March 14, 2000, until the Port Charles finale on October 3, 2003. In January 2013, it was revealed that Presley would be reprising her role as Alison on General Hospital. She is the granddaughter of Amanda Barrington and cousin of Mike Webber, and one half of the super couple, Rafe Kovich and Alison Barrington.

=== Casting ===
In March 2000, Port Charles hired actress Erin Hershey in the recurring role of Alison Barrington, the granddaughter of legendary General Hospital character Amanda Barrington (Anne Jeffreys). Hershey made a guest appearance on the parent series during the 2000 Nurses' Ball. Hershey married her Port Charles costar Brian Presley, who portrays Jack, in 2002. She stayed with the series until its cancellation on October 3, 2003.

In January 2013, it was announced that Presley was reprise the role on General Hospital. Her return coincided with the return of Jon Lindstrom, who portrayed Dr. Kevin Collins on both General Hospital and Port Charles, as part of a revisit to the vampire storyline. Shortly after her return, the character is killed off, leading to a murder mystery storyline on the series. Presley appeared as Alison from January 30–31, 2013. Presley returned as a ghost for two episodes from February 27–28, 2013.

=== Storylines ===
In January 2013, Alison returns to Port Charles, with her son Rafe, in tow. It is implied that Alison and Rafe have been on the run for many years, presumably from Caleb Morley. After leaving Rafe with a silver arrow to defend himself from harm, Alison makes her way to the Police Department, looking for information on Lucy Coe. Once there, she mistakes John McBain for Caleb, and Samantha Morgan for her old friend, Livvie Locke. Alison later contacts John to meet her at the Pier, but by the time he arrives, Alison has been stabbed to death by the very same arrow she had given to Rafe, who is detained as the primary suspect. Alison appears to Lucy and Rafe as a ghost when they are trying to confront Caleb, who is really Stephen Clay. She helps Lucy find a way out of the Spoon Island tunnels, and tells Rafe to not give up hope.

=== Reception ===
The pairing between Alison and Rafe Kovich proved to be extremely popular with critics and fans, leading to them becoming the first super couple on Port Charles. Janet Di Lauro of Soap Opera Digest wrote of the couple, " The minute actors Brian Gaskill and Erin Hershey Presley crossed paths on screen, the show's scribes knew they'd struck gold. "He looked at her and we said, 'Oh man, this is it!' recalls [Barbara] Esensten. 'Whenever we put them in a scene together, between those big, watery eyes of hers and the way he smiles at her ... I wish we could bottle it."' Soap Opera Digest also named Hershey "Performer of the Week" in their February 19, 2002 issue for her performance in portraying Alison as torn between Jamal and Rafe. Soap Opera Weekly's Joe Diliberto also praised Hershey for her work during "the crumbling of Alison's relationship with Jamal" and the beginning of her romance with Rafe. Diliberto said, "As Port Charles Alison, Erin Hershey mixed heaping amounts of amiability with dollops of sadness and a dash of bittersweet to come up with a performance sweeter than any candy." In 2003, Presley was nominated for a Daytime Emmy Award for Outstanding Younger Actress in a Drama Series for her work as Alison. She ultimately lost to Jennifer Finnigan of The Bold and the Beautiful.

Alison's return in 2013 was well received by critics and fans. Although several critics were disappointed that her return was short lived, and that Alison was murdered at the end of her second episode back.

== Kiefer Bauer ==
Kiefer Bauer
- General Hospital character
- Portrayed by: Christian Alexander
- Duration: 2009–10
- First appearance: June 10, 2009
- Last appearance: June 2, 2010
- Created by: Robert Guza, Jr.
- Introduced by: Jill Farren Phelps
In-universe information
- Occupation: Student at madison prep
- Father: Warren Bauer
- Mother: Melinda Bauer
- Siblings: Kendra Bauer

Kiefer Bauer is a fictional character on the ABC daytime drama, General Hospital, played by Christian Alexander. He was the first boyfriend of a newly SORASed Kristina Davis (Lexi Ainsworth) in 2009.

Since his debut, Kiefer proves to be abusive to Kristina. In June 2009, Kiefer gets into a fight with Kristina's 17-year-old brother Michael Corinthos, who had recently got out of a coma. Kiefer constantly harasses Michael, leading to the point where the two fight at the Port Charles Country Club. In July 2009, he flirts with another senior while dating Kristina. That same night, Kiefer helps Kristina cover her tracks when she runs her stepmother Claudia Zacchara off the road; Claudia later suffers a miscarriage.

Kiefer voices his disapproval of Kristina's father Sonny Corinthos, and comforts Kristina on various occasions when she is upset with him. Kiefer becomes jealous of Kristina's friendship with Ethan Lovett, which turns into a crush. After Kristina ditches Kiefer for Ethan, Kiefer beats Kristina up. To protect him from Sonny's wrath, Kristina tells everyone that Ethan was the one who abused her. Sonny's lieutenant and best friend, Jason Morgan, realizes that Kristina might be lying and convinces Detectives Dante Falconeri and Lucky Spencer to investigate further.

Kiefer worries the truth will come out and asks Kristina to reinstate charges against Ethan, but she refuses. Out of rage, Kiefer beats her up again, but runs into her mother Alexis Davis as he runs out of the house. While driving to the hospital, a distraught Alexis hits Kiefer with her car and does not tell anyone. Kristina's sisters Molly Lansing and Sam McCall find Kiefer's body and he dies shortly after being admitted to General Hospital. Alexis hides her guilt for a while, but eventually confesses. Meanwhile, Kristina is questioned by Dante and finally identifies Kiefer as her attacker on both occasions, giving Ethan a clean slate.

Kiefer appears one last time on June 2. Kristina has a dream of Kiefer being next to her bed, telling her to get up so they can go to the beach together. Kristina refuses, and Kiefer quickly becomes violent and slaps her right before Kristina wakes up.

== Jesse Beaudry ==
Jesse Beaudry
- General Hospital character
- Portrayed by: Matt Marraccini
- Duration: 2005–06
- First appearance: June 21, 2005
- Last appearance: March 31, 2006
- Created by: Robert Guza, Jr.; Charles Pratt, Jr.
- Introduced by: Jill Farren Phelps
In-universe information
- Occupation: Police officer

Jesse Beaudry is a fictional character on the ABC soap opera, General Hospital. Matt Marraccini was hired on a contract basis starting on June 21, 2005. Viewers immediately questioned if he would be a love interest for character Maxie Jones, portrayed by his former Clubhouse love interest and castmate, Kirsten Storms. Marraccini left the role when the character was killed off the series in 2006.

== Connor Bishop ==
Connor Bishop
- General Hospital character
- Portrayed by: Tyler Christopher
- Duration: 2004–05
- First appearance: October 26, 2004
- Last appearance: January 25, 2005
In-universe information
- Other names: Nikolas Cassadine
- Occupation: Marine (former)
- Spouse: Mary Bishop (1998–2004)

Connor Bishop, portrayed by Tyler Christopher was introduced to the canvas in 2004 as the presumed dead husband of the late Mary Bishop (Catherine Wadkins). Having been presumed dead in Iraq, Connor turns up in Port Charles to avenge Mary, who has recently been murdered. He sets out to steal to hurt Mary's killer Nikolas Cassadine (also Christopher) by going after his wife, Emily Quartermaine (Natalia Livingston). Connor kidnaps Emily who later convinces him that Mary would not have wanted this for him. Connor releases Emily and instead tries to blackmail Nikolas, having witnessed him push his grandmother Helena Cassadine (Constance Towers) off a cliff. Instead, Nikolas confesses to the crime. However, those who know Helena best assume she survived the fall from the cliff. With Nikolas in jail, Luke Spencer (Anthony Geary) convinces Connor to impersonate Nikolas to draw Helena out of hiding. To help, Emily coaches Connor on how to portray Nikolas and Connor develops feelings for her. However, Emily rejects Connor making it clear that she only has love for her husband. While the two are hiding from Helena in a cabin in the woods, Connor turns on Emily and she defends herself by hitting him with a champagne bottle. Connor in turn rapes Emily and she stabs him with a screwdriver before shooting him to death.

== Kristina Cassadine ==
Kristina Cassadine
- General Hospital character
- Portrayed by: Jaime Ray Newman
- Duration: 2001–2003
- First appearance: August 24, 2001
- Last appearance: January 6, 2003
- Created by: Megan McTavish
- Introduced by: Jill Farren Phelps
In-universe information
- Occupation: Princess of Greek nobility; Assistant
- Family: Cassadine
- Father: Mikkos Cassadine
- Mother: Kristin Bergman
- Stepmother: Helena Cassadine
- Sisters: Alexis Davis
- Half-brothers: Stavros Cassadine; Stefan Cassadine
- Grandfathers: Ivan Cassadine
- Uncles: Tony Cassadine; Victor Cassadine
- Aunts: Sophia Cassadine
- Nephews: Nikolas Cassadine
- Nieces: Sam McCall; Kristina Davis; Molly Lansing
- First cousins: Valentin Cassadine
- Other relatives: Petros Cassadine; Dimitri Cassadine; Spencer Cassadine; Ace Cassadine

Kristina Cassadine (previously Carter) is a fictional character on the ABC soap opera, General Hospital. She was portrayed by Jaime Ray Newman from 2001 until 2003. Kristina is the daughter of Mikkos Cassadine and opera singer Kristin Bergman, and the sister of Alexis Davis. When her mother was killed by Helena Cassadine, Mikkos' wife, her father fostered her with the Carter family to protect her.

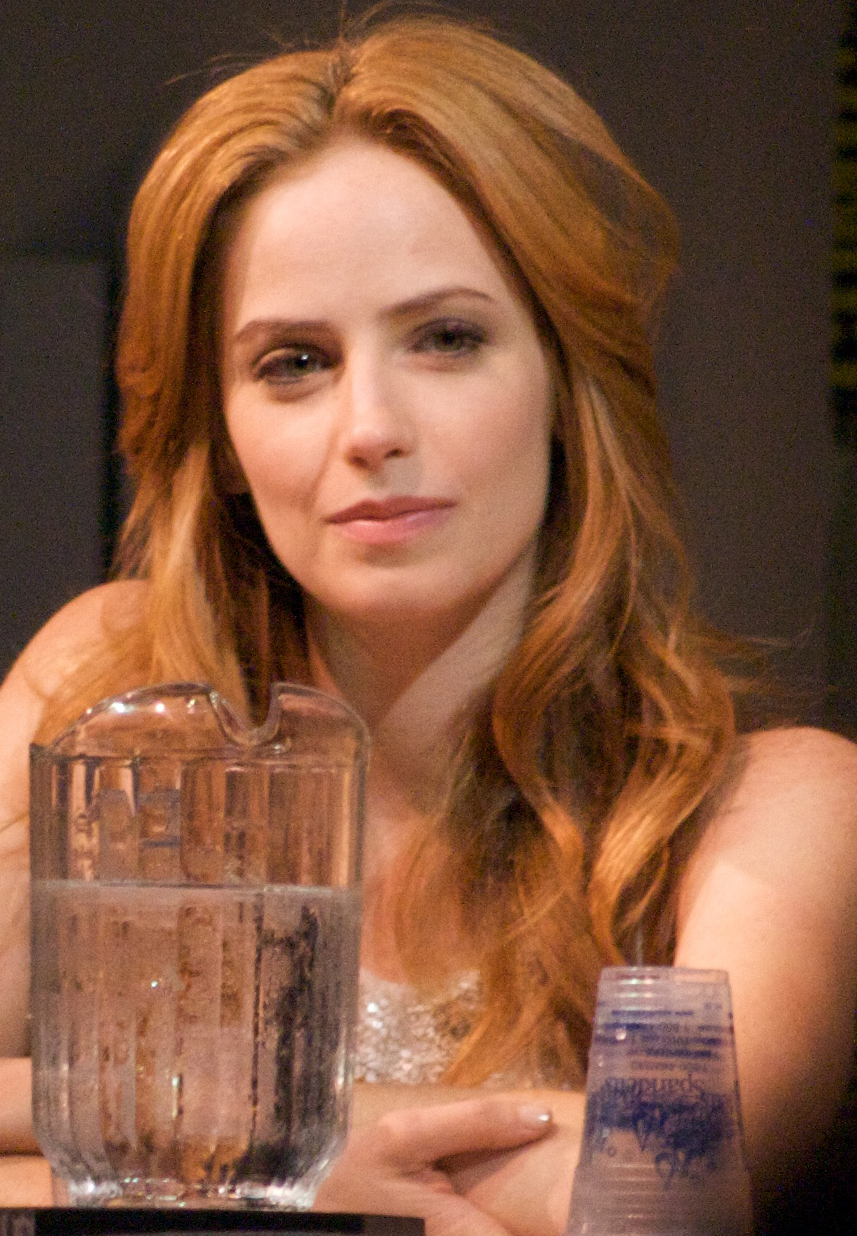
Jamie Ray Newman got her start on General Hospital.

As an adult, Kristina hires Angel Sorel Ellis to find her sister, Alexis. Ellis also works for Jasper Jacks (Jax), who reveals to Alexis in 2001 that her sister is alive. As they are about to meet Kristina, Jax and Alexis find Chloe Morgan dead. Alexis steps in to act as Stefan Cassadine's lawyer, who had been arrested for Chloe's murder. Meanwhile, Kristina meets Ned Ashton while at Luke's Club, and the two flirt. They go to the Police Department when they hear about Chloe, where Kristina tries to meet Alexis but Alexis is too distraught. Kristina later overhears Alexis tell Jax that their meeting should wait, but instead Kristina introduces herself and they hug. Alexis later tells Kristina the truth about how she was lost as a child.

Kristina later changes her name from Carter to Cassadine and decides to stay in Port Charles and live with Alexis. She works as Ned's assistant at L&B Records and they get engaged. Alexis later becomes pregnant with Sonny Corinthos' child, and Ned steps in as the father in an attempt to keep the baby away from Sonny's dangerous business. Believing Ned and Alexis had slept together, Kristina decides to leave town, but Alexis convinces her to stay. Kristina finds a letter proving Sonny is the father of Alexis' baby, and arranges to meet him at his warehouse. There she is caught in an explosion set by Luis Alcazar and is injured. At the hospital, Alexis begs her not to say anything, and she agrees.

Kristina dies in August 2002, and Alexis names her daughter Kristina Davis in memory of her sister. After baby Kristina is born, adult Kristina appears in a dream to Alexis. Days later, Luis Alcazar is pushed from his balcony and the killer is eventually revealed to be Alexis. Alexis fakes dissociative identity disorder, saying her other personality was Kristina, and is able to avoid murder charges.

== Gia Campbell ==
Gia Campbell
- General Hospital character
- Portrayed by: Marisa Ramirez (2000–2002); Andrea Pearson (2002–2003)
- Duration: 2000–2003
- First appearance: July 26, 2000
- Last appearance: October 22, 2003
- Created by: Robert Guza, Jr.
- Introduced by: Wendy Riche
- Spin-off appearances: Port Charles
In-universe information
- Occupation: Immigration attorney; Paralegal for Alexis Davis; Model for Deception Cosmetics; Publicist for A. J. Quartermaine
- Mother: Florence Campbell
- Half-brothers: Marcus Taggert
- Nieces: Trina Robinson

Gia Campbell is a fictional character on the ABC soap opera, General Hospital. She was portrayed by Marisa Ramirez from 2000 until 2002, and by Andrea Pearson from 2002 until the character was dropped in 2003.

Gia arrived in Port Charles and tried to blackmail Emily Bowen-Quartermaine. She got caught by Emily's friends, but agreed to help them out when they suspected Zander Smith of murder. After working together to solve the mystery, Gia grew close with Nikolas Cassadine. Gia's mother Florence Campbell was unhappy with Gia's decision and demanded that Gia return home with her. But Gia remained set on staying with Nikolas and tried to find a way to provide for herself. She got a job as a public relations assistant for AJ Quartermaine's football team. Gia and Nikolas started dating. Gia then became the new face of Deception, a cosmetic company owned by Laura Spencer, Nikolas' mother. Things were finally looking up for Gia, but that all came to a startling halt when Nikolas dumped her. What Gia didn't know was that this move was part of a scam to protect Lucky Spencer and to find out what Nikolas' grandmother Helena Cassadine was up to. Heartbroken, Gia tried to move on with her life and briefly dated Lucien Cane. Later, she found a picture of Nikolas with his father Stavros Cassadine and realized that the man she had been dating, Lucien Cane, was actually Stavros. Before she could warn Nikolas of the deception, Lucien showed up and took her to the room that he had decorated for Laura. When Nikolas showed up with Laura, Stavros locked Nikolas in the room with Gia. Stavros and Helena were soon defeated and Gia and Nikolas made it out alive.

After surviving this ordeal, Nikolas and Gia planned to move on with their lives and got engaged to marry. However, when Gia caused an accident involving Courtney Matthews and Elizabeth Webber, Nikolas was determined to cover up Gia's involvement, even though she wanted to come forward. Her brother, Detective Marcus Taggert, was furious about Gia and Nikolas covering up the crime, as was Elizabeth. However, Courtney decided to not press charges. Gia became a model again, with Nikolas' help, but when Lucky, Nikolas' brother, started helping Gia take pictures, Nikolas became jealous. When Lucky was framed for the murder of Rick Webber, Nikolas and Gia were able to help get the charges dropped. Gia gave up modeling in favor of working as a legal assistant for Alexis Davis. Gia was spending less time with Nikolas, and he voiced his displeasure to her several times. Gia and Nikolas' relationship got even more strained when Gia took more of an interest in Zander's life. Nikolas became extremely jealous of Zander and even tried to pay Zander to leave town. When Gia found out about his actions, she was very angry and after a fight, the two broke off their engagement.

After ending her engagement with Nikolas, Gia's hoped for a deeper relationship with Zander. When Emily returned to Port Charles, Zander became interested in her. Emily pushed Zander away and moved on to Nikolas. Gia found out that the real reason Emily pushed Zander away was because she had breast cancer, and didn't want him to watch her suffer and die. Gia confronted Emily, and she begged Gia to be with Zander since she couldn't and she wanted him to be happy. Gia's feelings for Zander were only growing, so she agreed to Emily's wish. But when Emily told her later on that she felt jealous of Gia's relationship with Zander, Gia got angry and was even more devastated when Emily finally told Zander the truth. When both Zander and Gia discovered that Emily had developed real feelings for Nikolas, they slept together. Afterwards, Gia told him that it was a mistake since he was still in love with Emily, and she finally let him go. She even helped him get dressed for his hospital wedding ceremony with Emily. When Zander and Emily appeared to be getting a divorce only weeks later, she urged Zander to keep fighting for his marriage. Gia faded into the background, and was last seen heading off to law school in 2003.

== Nadine Crowell ==
Nadine Crowell
- General Hospital character
- Portrayed by: Claire Coffee
- Duration: 2007–09
- First appearance: October 5, 2007
- Last appearance: March 3, 2009
- Created by: Robert Guza, Jr.
- Introduced by: Jill Farren Phelps
In-universe information
- Occupation: Nurse
- Sisters: Jolene Crowell
- Uncles: Vince Crowell
- Aunts: Raylene Crowell

Nadine Crowell is a fictional character on the ABC soap opera, General Hospital. She was portrayed by Claire Coffee from October 5, 2007, to March 3, 2009.

Nadine shows up at General Hospital in 2007 requesting to see her comatose sister Jolene. Damien Spinelli fills her in on Jolene's nefarious activities at GH. Nadine explains the two decided to become nurses after their father died on the operating table during a routine surgery.

Nadine and Spinelli go to Nikolas Cassadine's Black and White Ball together. Nadine, dressed the same as Lulu, is mistaken for her and captured by Anthony Zacchara. Anthony threatens to kill her, but Spinelli helps her get away. After the event and death of Nikolas' fiancé Emily Quartermaine, Nadine works with Nikolas on his brain tumor. She is the only one who knows that Nikolas sees Emily's ghost as an effect of the tumor. Meanwhile, Nadine is drugged and kidnapped by Diego Alcazar but is able to survive.

After learning that someone in Port Charles has been messing with the supply of counterfeit prescription drugs, Nadine, Nikolas, Lucky Spencer, and Sam McCall begin to investigate. Nadine believes that new doctor Matt Hunter is involved, but Nikolas thinks otherwise. Nadine confides in Leyla Mir about her feelings for Nikolas. She ends up kissing him but is embarrassed afterwards, and tells Nikolas she does not want to hear the "friend" speech. Nikolas admits to friend Elizabeth Webber that he's attracted to Nadine but feels like he would betray Emily's memory if he got involved with her. Elizabeth helps Nikolas to see that Emily would have wanted him to move on. Nikolas invites Nadine over and they have a romantic dinner together, ending the evening by dancing around the grounds.

Nikolas seems to be falling in love with Nadine. In September 2008, when the Emily Quartermaine clinic is burned down, injuring Nadine and Matt Hunter, he sits vigil by her side until she wakes up. He insists that she come to Wyndemere Castle to recuperate. It is there that Nikolas tells Nadine that he is starting to fall in love with her. The night of Kate Howard's shooting, Nikolas takes Nadine back to Wyndermere and they sleep together for the first time.

Nikolas and Nadine continue to spend more time together, and seem to be heading towards a relationship. When Nikolas is caught by the police while chasing after his mother Laura Spencer with his brother Lucky Spencer and sister Lulu Spencer, he was told he would be deported. Nadine offers to marry him and starts to make arrangements, until Nik reveals his lawyers have fixed the problem.

Nadine receives news that her Aunt Rayleen is very ill and only has a short time to live. Nadine and Nik visit Rayleen, and her last wish is for Nadine and Nik to get married. The couple pretend to be married so that Rayleen can die in peace. However, after Rayleen's death, Nadine receives an envelope containing the possessions Rayleen left her. It turns out she is now the new liaison with the government, who are doing business with weapon dealers. They need a crucial piece of information to finish their job. Nadine refuses to give up the information, but eventually, Nik offers to take over her share and let his lawyers handle everything.

They are both invited to the fundraiser for pediatric brain injuries in honor Michael Corinthos. Unfortunately, a man is brought into the hospital with spheres of airborne biotoxin in his body. One bursts during surgery, causing the entire OR team to collapse, and the toxin to spread through the ventilating system into the board room of the hospital, where the fundraiser was being held. Eventually, Nadine is released from the board room and seems to be okay. However, later that night her heart is broken when she hears Nikolas tell Monica Quartermaine that he would never love anyone the way he loved Emily.

Also later that night, Rebecca Shaw shows up in town, and is a deadringer of Emily. Nikolas becomes obsessed with her. Nadine realizes Nik has never been in love with her the way she thought he was, and heartbroken, she breaks up with him. Nik wishes her "the best of luck" and Nadine does the same.

== Ronnie Dimestico ==
Ronnie Dimestico
- General Hospital character
- Portrayed by: Ronnie Marmo
- Duration: 2009–12
- First appearance: July 9, 2009
- Last appearance: May 7, 2012
- Created by: Robert Guza, Jr.
- Introduced by: Jill Farren Phelps
In-universe information
- Occupation: Police detective
- Children: Ronnie Dimestico Jr. (Note: On the August 12, 2009 episode, Olivia tells Ronnie that Ronnie Jr. looks like him)

Ronnie Dimestico is a fictional character from the long running daytime soap opera, General Hospital. The character was portrayed by actor, Ronnie Marmo from July 9, 2009 to May 7, 2012.

Undercover cop Ronnie Dimestico arrives in Port Charles in July 2009 working for the Zacchara organization along with undercover cop Dante Falconeri. Ronnie grew up in Bensonhurst, where he knew Dante and Olivia Falconeri and became Dante's lieutenant. Dante and Ronnie work together to find evidence Sonny Corinthos killed his wife Claudia Zacchara by testing ashes from the fireplace at his house.

In December 2009, Ronnie is revealed to have had a past with Franco. Before he was accepted into the police academy, he allowed Franco to take the fall for a crime he committed. In February 2010, Dante and Ronnie decide to work for the Port Charles Police Department. Ronnie finds Johnny Zacchara shot in September 2010 and hides Johnny's gun to set Sonny up for attempted murder. In November 2011 Ronnie and Dante along with Dante's new partner Delores Padilla try to find who is beating up the strippers at Johnny's club. After an initial suspect in the case is found to have been murdered, Lulu suspects Padilla's husband, Eddie Cabrera, could be the assailant, providing an explanation as to why Padilla seems to be involved in the removal of evidence in the case. However, upon meeting Eddie, Lulu concocts a new theory. Perhaps Ronnie is the one attacking the strippers, and is attempting to pin the crimes on Eddie to avoid suspicion. Ronnie catches on and kidnaps Lulu to prevent her from saying anything. It is revealed he is in fact the person beating up the strippers. He frames Dante for the crime. He takes Lulu to a motel and holds her hostage there. In the hallway of the motel, he runs into Sam Morgan. When Sam gets suspicious of what's going on in the room, Ronnie kidnaps her too because she has become a liability just like Lulu. Dante and John finds them at the haunted and during a struggle. John shoots and kills Ronnie.

== Andrea Floyd ==
Andrea Floyd
- General Hospital character
- Portrayed by: Martha Byrne
- First appearance: June 17, 2009
- Last appearance: September 10, 2009
- Created by: Robert Guza, Jr.
- Introduced by: Jill Farren Phelps
In-universe information
- Occupation: Politician
- Spouse: Garrett Floyd

Andrea Floyd is a fictional character on the ABC Daytime soap opera General Hospital. She was portrayed by Martha Byrne from June through September 2009.

Andrea Floyd debuted on June 17, 2009, in Patrick Drake's office to talk about the malpractice suit against him and his brother Matt Hunter due to the death of Brianna Hughes during surgery. However, Robin Scorpio believes that Brianna was actually murdered, and starts her own investigation. After Andrea hears about Robin's suspicions, she gets the lawsuit dropped so that Robin would not have any excuse to dig any further. Robin still continues digging, and eventually accuses Andrea's husband, Mayor Garrett Floyd, of murdering his mistress Brianna. Andrea is very vocal in both her defense of her husband and verbal attacks against Robin, and orders her husband to keep quiet to protect both his job and their reputation.

Alexis Davis as the prosecuting DA soon gets into many heated arguments with Andrea. To throw suspicion off of the Floyds, Andrea plants incriminating emails on Alexis' computer, making it seem like the DA was stalking Mayor Floyd because she could not get over a one-night stand that they had had. Andrea succeeds in making Alexis look like a vengeful, scorned woman, and Alexis goes over to the Floyds' mansion one night in a futile attempt to talk privately with Garrett. Instead, she is met by Andrea, they get into another heated argument, and Alexis drives off in a highly emotional state in the same direction where Claudia Zacchara's car accident occurs.

When Garrett is proven innocent, Robin starts to suspect Andrea of being the one who caused Brianna's death, identifying both a possible weapon as well as a plausible scenario where Andrea walks into the hotel suite where Brianna was having a tryst with Garrett. Andrea eventually realizes that Robin suspects her of the murder, and attempts to cover up her tracks by eliminating the one person who remembers seeing her in the hotel at the time of Brianna's accident: Edward Quartermaine.

On September 8, she succeeds in drugging Edward's martini with digitalis, causing him to have a heart attack while he is driving. Edward's car careens uncontrollably through the hospital carnival, coming to rest against a ride after plowing through several people. Andrea was just in the midst of another argument with Alexis when Edward's car hits her, and she dies from her injuries. At the morgue, Robin goes through Andrea's personal effects and finds the empty bottle of digitalis, enabling her to finally put all the pieces together and present her uncle Mac Scorpio, the police commissioner, with all the proof required not just to clear Edward of all charges, but also to prove that Andrea was the one who killed Brianna.

== Garrett Floyd ==
Garrett Prescott Floyd
- General Hospital character
- Portrayed by: John Bolger
- Duration: 2006–12
- First appearance: May 5, 2006
- Last appearance: January 6, 2012
- Created by: Robert Guza, Jr.
- Introduced by: Jill Farren Phelps
In-universe information
- Occupation: Former owner and editor-in-chief of the port charles press former mayor
- Spouse: Andrea Floyd

Garrett Prescott "Pres" Floyd is a fictional character on ABC's daytime drama General Hospital. He was portrayed by actor John Bolger from 2006 until 2012.

=== Storylines ===
Garrett Floyd debuted in 2006 as Mayor of Port Charles. Even though he was mayor of the town for 5 years, he is not liked by most people in Port Charles. It was revealed in June 2009 he has a wife named Andrea Floyd, whom he often cheated on with several different mistresses. On June 10, 2009 Patrick Drake, Robin Scorpio-Drake, and Olivia Falconeri walked into a room at the Metro Court Hotel to find Brianna Hughes, lying unconscious on the bed with Garrett. It was revealed she was his mistress. Garrett told the trio she bumped her head while they were having sexual relations in the shower. Brianna was taken to General Hospital. Days later, she died in surgery. Robin, Patrick, Damian Spinelli, Maxie Jones, and Sam McCall then set out to investigate the true cause of her death. Patrick and Robin had their suspicions Brianna had actually been murdered by Garrett in an attempt to cover up their affair. Garret quickly became a suspect in her murder. However, as the clues piled in and his alibi checked out, Garrett was cleared and a new suspect emerged – Alexis Davis. During the murder investigation, it was revealed Garrett and Alexis had a secret and adulterous one night stand in the summer of 2006. News of the scandal had an adverse reaction on Alexis' two youngest daughters, Kristina Corinthos-Davis and Molly Lansing-Davis who did not like how their mother was being portrayed in the media. News of their affair also brought the jealous wrath of Garret's wife Andrea down on Alexis' head. Andrea, who was later revealed to be the true murderer. She began to frame Alexis for the murder, painting her as a jealous ex-lover who wanted to eliminate the competition. Andrea stalked and taunted Alexis. They got into several confrontations. When Andrea herself became a suspect in the murder, she planted fake evidence in Alexis' home and even poisoned Edward Quartermaine to keep him quiet about the murder. Later that day, in an ironic twist, Edward suffered a heart attack due to the poisoning, which caused him to lose control of his car and run down Andrea down at a carnival. She later died at General Hospital and her role as Brianna's murderer was revealed to all, clearing Alexis. In the summer of 2011, Garret oversaw the graduation ceremony of students graduating from Madison Preparatory School. When Michael Corinthos got into a fight with another student Bryce who was taunting Michael's younger sister, Kristina, Garrett banned both Michael and Bryce from the graduation ceremony and refused to hand over their diplomas. However, after the ceremony, Garrett was strong-armed by Michael's father Sonny Corinthos. He eventually handed over Michael's diploma to Sonny, who awarded his son with his diploma at Michael and Kristina's graduation party. On December 6, 2011, Garrett comes into Jake's with Diane Miller, saying he has resigned from being mayor and is now the owner and editor-in-chief of the local newspaper, the Port Charles Press, formerly the Port Charles Herald. He also says he is going by his middle name, Prescott, or Pres for short because Garret Floyd is attached to scandals he had as mayor.

== Max Giambetti ==
Max Giambetti
- General Hospital character
- Portrayed by: Derk Cheetwood
- Duration: 2001–2016, 2018
- First appearance: August 6, 2001
- Last appearance: August 21, 2018
- Created by: Megan McTavish
- Introduced by: Jill Farren Phelps
- Book appearances: The Secret Life of Damian Spinelli
- Spin-off appearances: General Hospital: Night Shift
In-universe information
- Occupation: Bodyguard for Sonny Corinthos and Jason Morgan
- Father: Maximus Giambetti
- Siblings: Milo Giambetti; Unnamed Sister

Maximus "Max" Giambetti Jr. is a fictional character on the ABC daytime soap opera General Hospital. He has been played by actor Derk Cheetwood since 2001. Cheetwood is the real-life brother of Drew Cheetwood, who plays his on-screen brother Milo Giambetti, and real-life cousin of Tyler Christopher, fellow cast member who plays Nikolas Cassadine.

=== Background ===
Max is the son of mobster Maximus Giambetti and the older half-brother of Milo Giambetti. He starts working as a bodyguard and driver for mobsters Sonny Corinthos and Jason Morgan in 2002. Max is shown to be particularly good with Sonny's children Michael Corinthos III and Morgan Corinthos as they grow up. Max has been a faithful employee of Sonny's for years and often goes above and beyond what he is required to do. Speaking of his characterization, Cheetwood describes to Soap Opera Digest, "The thing about Max that people always say they like is the humor that I bring to him. I think the mob is dark, so I try to bring a vulnerability to Max and make him funny and kind of oafish."

=== Storylines ===
In 2006, when Jason takes over Sonny's business because Sonny refuses to stop dating his sister, Emily Quartermaine, Max refuses to take sides in their war, and instead opts to stay loyal to both men. In 2007, Max becomes the head security guard for the Metro Court Hotel. After finding it boring, he resumes his position in Sonny Corinthos' organization. Also in 2007, Max begins dating mob lawyer Diane Miller. Before dating Diane, he had a long time crush on Sonny's ex-wife Carly Corinthos Jacks. In 2008, Max's father Maximus Giambetti, played by Vincent Pastore, comes to town. A famed mobster, Maximus believes that Max is the head of the Port Charles organized crime organization, and Max enlists Milo and Jason, among others, to help maintain the lie until his father leaves. In 2010, Max works as the primary bodyguard for Sonny's ex-wife Brenda Corinthos and her son Alec Scott before they leave Port Charles and returned to Rome. On August 25, 2011, Max and Diane end their four-year relationship and decide to go their separate ways. They part amicably as friends.

== Milo Giambetti ==
Milo Giambetti
- General Hospital character
- Portrayed by: Drew Cheetwood
- Duration: 2006–2019, 2023
- First appearance: March 14, 2006
- Last appearance: April 7, 2023
- Created by: Robert Guza, Jr.
- Introduced by: Jill Farren Phelps
In-universe information
- Other names: Magic Milo; Mark Turner
- Occupation: Fitness director former bodyguard for sonny corinthos
- Father: Maximus Giambetti
- Half-brothers: Max Giambetti

Milo Giambetti is a fictional character on the popular ABC soap opera, General Hospital. Drew Cheetwood assumed the role in 2006. Chetwood is the real-life brother of Derk Cheetwood, who plays Milo's brother Max Giambetti, and the real-life cousin of Tyler Christopher, who plays Nikolas Cassadine.

Milo is a body guard for Sonny Corinthos and Jason Morgan in their criminal organization. In 2006, Milo makes many strides to attain the affection of Lulu Spencer, competing against her other suitors Dillon Quartermaine and Damian Spinelli. In 2012, he reluctantly dances at the bachelorette party for Kate Howard, and is briefly seduced by her alter, Connie. In 2013, he briefly dates Sabrina Santiago. In May, Milo helps Lulu, who is dealing with memory loss and reveals his longtime feelings for her, leading Lulu to kiss him and trust him in his condo.

In July, Milo is offered a job as a fitness instructor for Lucy Coe's spa. He would accept and would tell Sonny that he quit.

Recently Milo confessed to Sonny about having an attraction to someone that his father might object to. Sonny encouraged him to follow his heart. He then spoke to Felix DuBois about it and received the same advice from him. When Milo said that his crush was older and African American, Felix hoped Milo was speaking about him but Milo was speaking about Epiphany Johnson. Milo finally asked Epiphany out and she accepted. They now regularly date.

In September 2020 Epiphany reveals that she and Milo have split up, confiding in Elizabeth Baldwin that they hadn't seen each other in months.

Milo was present at Epiphany's memorial service. Upon meeting Curtis Ashford and his father, Marshall is surprised to find out that Milo is Epiphany's ex.

== Logan Hayes ==
Logan Hayes
- General Hospital character
- Portrayed by: Josh Duhon
- Duration: 2007–08
- First appearance: March 7, 2007
- Last appearance: September 2, 2008
- Created by: Robert Guza, Jr.
- Introduced by: Jill Farren Phelps
In-universe information
- Occupation: Bodyguard to anthony zacchara
- Father: Scott Baldwin
- Mother: Jacqueline Hayes
- Siblings: Robert Frank; Karen Wexler; Serena Baldwin; Christina Baldwin (adoptive)
- Grandparents: David Bordisso; Meg Bentley; Lee Baldwin (adoptive)

Logan Houston Hayes is a fictional character on the popular ABC soap opera, General Hospital. He was portrayed by Josh Duhon from March 7, 2007 to September 2, 2008.

Through some investigation, Lulu Spencer discovered Scott had fathered a son in Texas around the same time Logan was born. Logan later admitted he had known Scott was his father since he was 10 or 12 because he discovered some letters Scott had written to his mother. He also said Scott had ruined his family with a bad business deal years before. Because of this, when Logan met Scott he took an automatic dislike to him and they fought constantly whenever they saw each other. Scott denied for a while he was Logan's father until September when they agreed to take a DNA test. On October 3, 2007 it was revealed Scott was, indeed, Logan's father. Since then, Logan and Scott have started to develop a slightly better relationship.

In the very beginning of 2008, Scott and Logan's relationship seemed to be on good terms when Logan asked Scott for help in getting a job. However, all too soon, the relationship became tense again when the file containing the DNA results for Georgie Jones' murder was stolen right off the police commissioner's desk. Logan had been there that day, so Scott asked him if he took the file to use as blackmail to keep Johnny Zacchara away from Lulu, since he was one of the people suspected for her murder. Logan denied taking it and was angry Scott would accuse him of doing such a thing. He stormed off telling Scott not to bother him again and was glad he had stayed out of his life as a child. He has been lately pursuing Alexis Davis to hand over her job as District Attorney to him.

When Logan was killed July 8, 2008 in self-defense by Lulu Spencer, after Lulu saw Logan beat up Maxie. Scott was devastated and is now out for blood. Scott was the prosecutor in Johnny Zacchara's trial despite being the murder victim's father. He used several dirty tricks to get Johnny the death penalty including fraud by forging papers stating his son was working undercover for the police and calling an unstable Lulu to the stand. When Johnny was acquitted of his son's murder, Scott went ballistic at the jury and has taken his failure hard ever since and has harassed Johnny several times.

== Matt Hunter ==
Matt Hunter
- General Hospital character
- Portrayed by: Jason Cook
- Duration: 2008–12
- First appearance: June 26, 2008
- Last appearance: June 11, 2012
- Created by: Robert Guza, Jr.
- Introduced by: Jill Farren Phelps
In-universe information
- Occupation: Neurosurgeon
- Father: Noah Drake
- Mother: Donna Hunter
- Siblings: Patrick Drake
- Spouse: Maxie Jones (2012)
- Nieces and nephews: Emma Drake; Gabriel Santiago; Noah Drake

Matthew "Matt" Randall Hunter M.D. is a fictional character on the ABC soap opera General Hospital. The role was portrayed by Jason Cook from June 26, 2008 to June 11, 2012.

=== Casting ===
It was first announced in May, 2008, that Jason Cook, known for his seven-year portrayal of Shawn-Douglas Brady on Days of Our Lives, would appear on General Hospital in early June. His premiere date was pushed back to June 26, 2008. There was originally some speculation that Cook would portray Steven Webber. These rumors turned out to be false, as Cook played a new character, Matt Hunter. Cook was originally slated to appear just for a guest appearance, but the role was expanded. There was also speculation that Cook would be paired with Kirsten Storms (Maxie Jones), his former Days of Our Lives co-star, because of their popular relationship on the rival series. In 2012, it was announced that Cook would exit the series because of several upcoming projects. Cook said of his decision to leave the series, "I was going to have to take several months off the show for all these other things I'm working on, so I am stepping away for the time being, [t]here is no talk about me coming back."

=== Storylines ===
Matt arrived in Port Charles as a resident doctor at General Hospital under a fellowship sponsored by Nikolas Cassadine. He was initially suspected by nurse Nadine Crowell of being involved in a counterfeit drug ring, but later teams up with her to uncover the real criminals. During the course of the investigation, he is trapped in a fire and is hospitalized, where he is visited by Noah Drake. Their conversation is overheard by Patrick Drake, Noah's son, who is shocked to discover that Noah is Matt's father as well. Patrick works on developing a relationship with him, and convinces Matt to be his best man at his wedding to Robin Scorpio. With Robin's help the brothers succeed in bonding, even though they remain very competitive especially in the operating room. This has led Matt into some predicaments: he was poisoned as a result of operating on a man that no one knew was transporting poison capsules in his stomach; and he was sued for malpractice after the mayor's mistress died during "routine surgery". Patrick and Robin were able to prove his innocence in the latter case by proving the death was actually a homicide, and with the help of Andrea Floyd, the mayor's wife, the malpractice suit was dropped. Despite his numerous flirtations with many women around Port Charles, he remained single for two years. In 2010, Maxie Jones, who then was still involved with Spinelli, came up with an absurd plan to make Spinelli feel more confident about himself and their relationship. She decided to pretend to be interested in Matt, so he would fall in love with her and then she could reject him, showing Spinelli he doesn't have anything to worry about. Matt, however, had been interested in Maxie for quite some time, and saw this as a chance to impress her. After the first few dates, and a first kiss, Maxie found herself being drawn to Matt, unable to stop thinking about him, and she eventually broke up with Spinelli. Matt and Maxie's relationship was cut short for a little while after Matt discovered that Maxie used him to make Spinelli jealous, but after Maxie's father Mac was shot and Matt saved his life, the two reunited, beginning a real relationship. Maxie soon found out she could feel more herself in her relationship with Matt, confessing to Robin that Matt might be the perfect guy for her.

A year later, they began to experience trouble. Matt was working hard on getting a research of his published in an important magazine, and Maxie paid little attention to this, feeling it was more important to focus on her own career. This led to Matt building a friendship with Maxie's enemy, Elizabeth Webber. Maxie became extremely jealous and even got Elizabeth suspended from her job, after accusing her of stealing medication. During this, Matt was also a suspect in the murder of Lisa Niles, and frustrated with both that and Maxie's behavior, Matt broke up with her. He started to feel more drawn to Elizabeth and kissed her on a party thrown in his honor for getting his research published. Elizabeth however, felt nothing but friendship and was instead drawn to a co-worker named Ewen. Matt and Elizabeth decided not long after that, that it was better to remain friends. Tragedy struck when Robin was killed in a lab explosion after a gasleak, leaving Patrick a widower and a single father. Matt supported his brother as much as he could, helping arrange the funeral as well as taking care of Emma. This tragedy also brought him closer again to Maxie, who confessed to him that she most likely caused the gasleak, feeling responsible for Robin's death. Unable to cope with her guilt, Maxie then confessed to the murder of Lisa Niles instead, feeling it was justice to be locked for good. Matt has since been trying to talk her out of it, even teaming up with Spinelli to prove Maxie did not kill Lisa. After visiting Maxie in jail, Matt told her that he didn't like his life without her, and he declared his love for her. Just hours before that, however, Spinelli discovered that Matt might have murdered Lisa. Maxie is released when Spinelli tells the police that Matt murdered Lisa, and she is forced to testify against him. To avoid this, Matt and Maxie get married on May 29, 2012, and the both of them are released from all charges. Matt later has a talk with Patrick about the marriage, and Matt tells Patrick he's happy with Maxie, and that he loves her.

Shortly after his marriage to Maxie, Matt is able to recall his memories of murdering Lisa, and unable to live with the guilt, turns himself in. Under a plea bargain deal, Matt is sentenced to five years in Pentonville. At the Floating Rib, Matt says his goodbyes to Mac, Felicia, and an emotional Maxie, who he intends to annul his marriage to, before heading off to begin serving his sentence. In October, it is revealed that Maxie had asked him for a divorce, which he agreed to and Maxie confirms later that they're divorced.

== Amelia Joffe ==
Amelia Joffe
- General Hospital character
- Portrayed by: Annie Wersching; Darby Stanchfield (2007, temp.)
- First appearance: March 9, 2007
- Last appearance: September 20, 2007
- Created by: Robert Guza, Jr.
- Introduced by: Jill Farren Phelps
In-universe information
- Occupation: Producer of everyday heroes
- Father: Bill Monroe
- Stepmother: Sam McCall (backstory)

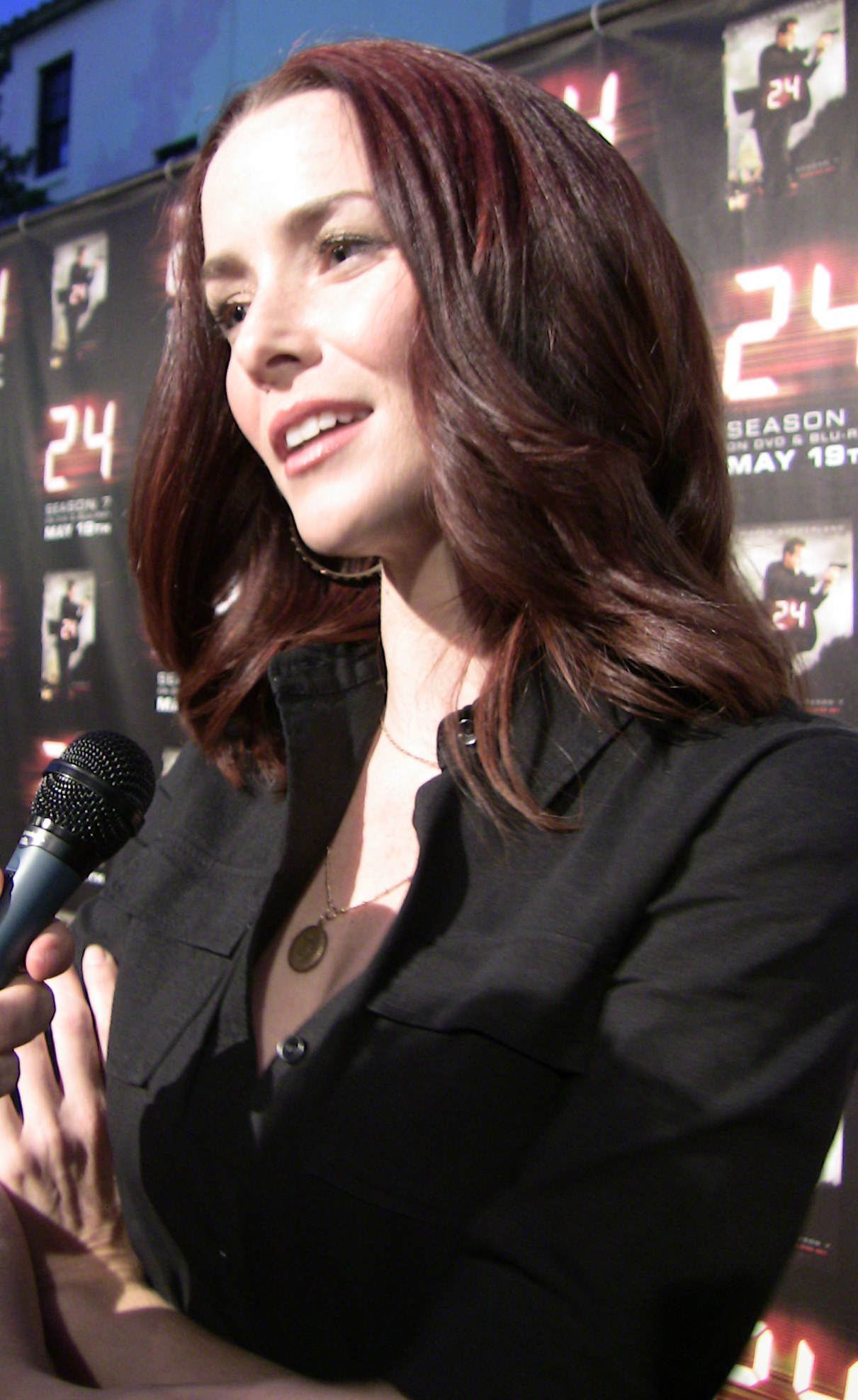
Annie Wersching portrayed Amelia in 2007.

Amelia Joffe is a fictional character on the ABC soap opera General Hospital. She was portrayed by Annie Wersching from March 9, 2007 to September 20, 2007. Darby Stanchfield temporarily replaced Annie for two weeks in May 2007. Her father, Bill Monroe, left her mother and married gold-digger Angela Monroe (Sam McCall). Bill was an abusive man, and Angela/Sam ended up shooting him to defend herself. Amelia came to Port Charles to expose Sam's past and ruin her life. She got a job as producer of "Everyday Heroes," and had a sexual fling with Sonny Corinthos. She also helped Jason Morgan save the kidnapped Jake Spencer.

== Epiphany Johnson ==
Epiphany Johnson
- General Hospital character
- Portrayed by: Sonya Eddy
- Duration: 2006–2022
- First appearance: March 22, 2006
- Last appearance: October 20, 2022
- Created by: Robert Guza, Jr. Charles Pratt, Jr.
- Introduced by: Jill Farren Phelps
- Book appearances: The Secret Life of Damian Spinelli
- Spin-off appearances: General Hospital: Night Shift
In-universe information
- Occupation: Nurse at General Hospital
- Children: Stan Johnson

Epiphany Johnson is a fictional character on the American soap opera General Hospital, originated by Sonya Eddy. Epiphany has been the head nurse at General Hospital since the character debuted in March 2006 on a recurring basis. She is the mother of Stan Johnson, who worked for Sonny Corinthos and Jason Morgan in their mob organization. Eddy was upgraded to contract status in August 2007 when she began appearing on the spin-off, General Hospital: Night Shift. She was downgraded to recurring status in 2011.

=== Storylines ===
After serving as head nurse at GH since 2006, Epiphany was briefly demoted in September 2020 by new chairman of the board Cyrus Renault as a sinister attempt to use GH for his drug dealing and other activities. She is replaced by Cassandra Bryant. About a month after she lost her position as head nurse, Epiphany reveals during a girl's night out with Elizabeth Baldwin that she and Milo broke up. Epiphany told Elizabeth that the reason for the split was he was constantly traveling and they hadn't seen each other in months.

Fortunately in 2021 after Cyrus Renault was sent back to prison, Epiphany was reinstated as head nurse. In January 2022 Epiphany begins dating Marshall Ashford. While on a date with her he collapses and is taken to GH. Epiphany clashes with Dr. Rose when she weighs in about Marshall's care. Weeks later, Epiphany also had a run in with Dr. Nelson over protocols when she treated Willow Tait after she fainted. Epiphany then decides to attend medical school and study for the MCATs.

In early February 2023 Marshall mentions to Trina Robinson that Epiphany passed her exams and was checking out medical schools on the West Coast. Marshall is uncertain about his future with Epiphany but hopes she returns to Port Charles.

In March 2023 Elizabeth reaches out to Epiphany for a recommendation letter to keep her job. Portia Robinson tells Elizabeth that no one has been able to reach Epiphany and she may not have gotten Liz's request yet. On March 28 Elizabeth gets a call from a State Trooper who breaks the news to Elizabeth about her death.

Epiphany is driving back to Port Charles and stops to help someone in a bad car crash. The smoke from the wreckage exacerbates Epiphany's heart condition and the medical personnel are unable to save her.

All of Epiphany friends and co-workers attend her memorial service, including the woman she saved from the wreckage. She reveals how Epiphany died.

== Lydia Karenin ==
Lydia Karenin
- General Hospital character
- Portrayed by: Jessica Ferrarone (2003); J. Robin Miller (2003)
- First appearance: June 9, 2003
- Last appearance: December 11, 2003
- Created by: Robert Guza, Jr. Charles Pratt, Jr.
- Introduced by: Jill Farren Phelps
In-universe information
- Spouse: Nikolas Cassadine (2003)
- Grandparents: Anton Karenin

Lydia Karenin is a fictional character on the ABC soap opera, General Hospital. The role was portrayed by Jessica Ferrarone from June 9, 2003 to July 8, 2003 and J. Robin Miller from July 11, 2003 to December 11, 2003. She was briefly married to Nikolas Cassadine.

=== Storylines ===
Lydia came to Port Charles to marry Nikolas Cassadine. They did not know each other. Stefan Cassadine arranged for Lydia's grandfather to give Nikolas and Lydia $20 million if they married. Nikolas did not want to marry Lydia, he was in love with Emily Quartermaine. Stefan realized that Emily would be a problem. Stefan sent Darius to kill Emily. Darius killed Summer Halloway, Lucky Spencer's girlfriend instead of Emily. Lydia walked in on Stefan yelling at Darius for the mix up. Stefan threatened Lydia to keep quiet about it or he would have her framed for the murder.

Stefan was able to convince them to get married. Lydia found herself attracted to her future brother-in-law Lucky Spencer. Nikolas walked in on them while they were kissing. She covered it up by slapping Lucky. While planning the wedding, Lydia began to develop feelings for Nikolas, but Nikolas was still in love with Emily. To get his attention, she faked a suicide attempt. She took some pills with vodka. Nikolas and Lucky found her and took her to the hospital. Nik and Lydia were married that week. Lydia was really falling in love with her husband, but Nik still wanted to be with Emily. Emily and Lydia did not get along. They learned that for them to get the money, they would have to have a child.

Lucky was looking into his girlfriend's death and Lydia decided to help him. She recorded a conversation with Stefan and he was arrested and put on trial for murder. Emily married Zander Smith and Lydia thought her marriage with Nikolas would finally take off. Even though Emily was married, pictures were taken of Emily and Nikolas almost getting intimate. Nikolas was mugged. Nikolas asked Lydia for a divorce. She wanted him to stick out the plan. Lydia received the pictures of Emily and Nik together and showed them to Zander. Zander beat Nikolas up in the hospital. Lydia packed her belongings and went to stay with Lucky at Kelly's Diner.

Luke Spencer returned to Port Charles when Stefan got away with murder. Luke was originally accused of Summer's murder. He kidnapped Stefan and then gathered all the people that he angered and held a mock trial. Everyone in Port Charles was able to view it on their TV. At the end of the mock trial Stefan admitted to killing Summer. Luke was arrested for putting on the trial.

Lydia and Nikolas divorced. She sought comfort in Lucky. Stefan kidnapped her and tied her to a pole. He suggested that they have sex and conceive a child and pass it off as Nikolas's so they can get the money. While Stefan stepped away, Lucky came to rescue Lydia. Stefan caught him and knocked him unconscious. He tied Lucky up. Luke arrived and found Lucky tied up. Stefan took Lydia hostage. she managed to get away from him. Luke and Stefan had it out and ended up on the same cliff that Summer had fallen from. Stefan fell from the cliff and died.

After her divorce with Nikolas. Lydia began getting close to A. J. Quartermaine. A.J. was CEO of ELQ. He stole his family's money and took off with Lydia.

== Molly Lansing-Davis ==
Molly Lansing-Davis
- General Hospital character
- Portrayed by: Hope and Faith Dever (2005–2007); Iris and Ivy Kaim (2007–2008); Haley Pullos (2009–2023); Holiday Mia Kriegel (2023); Brooke Anne Smith (2023); Kristen Vaganos (2023–present)
- Duration: 2005–present
- First appearance: November 10, 2005
- Created by: Robert Guza, Jr. and Charles Pratt, Jr.
- Introduced by: Jill Farren Phelps (2005–2009); Frank Valentini (2023)
- Book appearances: The Secret Life of Damian Spinelli
- Spin-off appearances: General Hospital: Night Shift
In-universe information
- Other names: Desdemona; Molly Davis
- Occupation: Assistant District Attorney; Intern; Author; Student
- Family: Cassadine
- Parents: Ric Lansing; Alexis Davis
- Half-sisters: Sam Morgan; Kristina Davis
- Civil partner: TJ Ashford (2021–2024)
- Daughters: Irene Davis-Ashford (legal)
- Grandfathers: Trevor Lansing; Mikkos Cassadine
- Grandmothers: Adela Corinthos; Kristin Bergman
- Uncles: Stavros Cassadine; Stefan Cassadine; Sonny Corinthos
- Aunts: Kristina Cassadine
- Nephews: Danny Morgan
- Nieces: Emily Cain; Lila McCall; Irene Davis-Ashford
- First cousins: Nikolas Cassadine; Dante Falconeri; Michael Corinthos (adoptive); Kristina Davis; Morgan Corinthos; Avery Corinthos; Donna Corinthos
- Other relatives: Helena Cassadine; Valentin Cassadine; Spencer Cassadine; Charlotte Cassadine; Rocco Falconeri; Wiley Cooper-Jones; Amelia Corinthos; Irene Davis-Ashford

Molly Lansing-Davis was introduced in November 2005 as the daughter of the daughter of Ric Lansing and Alexis Davis. In 2009, Haley Pullos took over the role. In May 2023, it was announced Holiday Mia Kriegel was temporarily cast in the role, following a car accident, which resulted in Pullos' arrest. On July 19, 2023, Brooke Anne Smith debuted in the role, replacing Kriegel. On September 27, 2023, Kristen Vaganos assumed the role, replacing Smith.

=== Storylines ===
In November 2005, Molly was introduced in the Glencoe tunnel with the help of Robin Scorpio, after many of Port Charles' best-known residents were involved in a train crash. Through her mother she is descended from Russian royalty, although this is only alluded to. Following her parents' divorce, Ric won primary custody of Molly, with Alexis having visitation rights (although Ric and Alexis later agreed to joint custody). When Ric unexpectedly moved to Los Angeles in June 2009, Molly remained in Port Charles with Alexis. She soon begins to deal with the fallout of her family's problems, including the scandal of Alexis' affair with Mayor Floyd, and Kristina's abuse at the hands of her boyfriend, Kiefer Bauer. Molly is close to Kristina and her cousins, Michael and Morgan Corinthos. The four are often conspiring together, trying to help the others stay out of trouble. Molly is shown to be precocious and a hopeless romantic, trying to set up Alexis and Mac Scorpio, and setting up romantic dates for Sam and Jason Morgan. Molly is on the ski trip bus when it crashes, but survives with minor injuries. However, she experiences sudden mood swings and rage afterwards. Molly suspects she has bipolar disorder, like her uncle, Sonny Corinthos, but later discovers that she's suffering from PTSD. She decides to get help by going to therapy.

By high school, she starts tutoring T.J. Ashford, who recently arrived in town. To help Molly make friends, T.J. throws an unsupervised party at Molly's house. Unfortunately, Molly ends up passing out after accidentally consuming a spiked drink, and Michael ends up saving her. Furious, Alexis forbids Molly from seeing T.J., but Molly defies her, and starts dating T.J. behind Alexis' back. They're caught, but Alexis reluctantly lets them date if they agree to follow the rules.

Molly is thrilled to become an aunt when Sam and Jason have a son named Danny Morgan. While babysitting Danny, she ends up meeting Rafe Kovich, Jr., a homeless teenager. He gets arrested when his mother, Alison Barrington, is murdered. When he escapes police custody, Molly agrees to hide him out in her room. Rafe is discovered, though, and turns himself in so Molly won't get in trouble. When Sam and Danny go missing, Molly helps Rafe and John McBain escape police lock-up to rescue them. She is arrested, but Alexis manages to get her released. Rafe is also proven innocent, and starts to develop a crush on Molly. Molly only sees him as a friend, and keeps dating T.J. When Taylor DuBois starts pursuing T.J., Molly is conflicted between T.J. and Rafe. She attends prom with Rafe, but afterwards, she decides to be with T.J., and the two reunite. Molly writes a book, Love in Maine, that is stolen by Connie Falconeri and published under her own name. Molly tries to sue Connie, though she has no proof. Connie eventually reveals Molly as the writer, giving Molly credit as the author. When Rafe purposely tries to sabotage Molly and T.J.'s relationship, Molly pushed him away.

Ric comes back to town, and Molly starts building a relationship with him. However, their reunion was cut short when Ric was arrested for mob-related activities. Though Molly believed Ric was framed, Ric was killed while in police custody. Molly was heartbroken over losing her father. She believed Ric had been framed by Julian Jerome, Alexis' new boyfriend and a mobster, to make it look like Ric was Julian's boss. She became distant from both Alexis and Julian, as a result. Ric was revealed to be alive, as the police figured out that Ric had been framed and faked his death to catch the real culprit. Molly was reunited with her father, and tried to be more accepting of Julian and Alexis' relationship.

Molly got into an accident with Rafe when she found he was using drugs, and tried to stop him from driving high. While they were in the car, Rafe admitted to causing the accident that ran Patrick Drake's family off the road, killing Patrick's son, Gabriel. Rafe told Molly someone told him to cause the accident, but before she could find out who, they crashed. Molly survived, but Rafe dies after being taken off life support. Molly mourned Rafe's death, but passed on Rafe's last words so that the police could find out who hired him.

== Trevor Lansing ==
Trevor Lansing
- General Hospital character
- Portrayed by: Kerry Aissa (2003–2004); Stephen Macht (2007–2009)
- Duration: 2003–2004; 2007–2009
- First appearance: 2003
- Last appearance: February 13, 2009
- Created by: Robert Guza, Jr. and Charles Pratt Jr.
- Introduced by: Jill Farren Phelps
In-universe information
- Occupation: Attorney mobster
- Children: Ric Lansing
- Grandchildren: Molly Lansing

Trevor Richard Lansing is a fictional character from the ABC soap opera, General Hospital. The role was originated by veteran actor Stephen Macht in August 2007 on a recurring basis. Macht departed from the role in February 2009.

=== Characterization ===
Macht describes his character as more than an attorney, but a "power manager". "He doesn't take anything too seriously, except power", Macht stated during an interview with Soap Opera Digest. Trevor's dynamic with his love affair, Kate Howard (Megan Ward), displays quite an unusual dynamic. Macht revealed that though his character would love to get back together with her, he mistreats her because of her involvement with his "step-son", Sonny Corinthos (Maurice Benard), and his pride is hurt; he has lost yet another woman to Sonny. Trevor's hate for Sonny stems from Adela's decision to choose Sonny over him and their son, Ric (Rick Hearst). When Adela dies, it destroys Trevor's faith in love and drives a wedge between him and Ric.

=== Backstory ===
The character of Trevor Lansing is first mentioned in 2003 by his son, Ric who has come to Port Charles to ruin the life of his maternal half-brother, Sonny Corinthos. Ric reveals that after Sonny's father, Mike Corbin, walked out on Sonny and his wife Adela, Adela began an affair with the married Trevor who at the time was her boss. He sends Adela and Sonny to live at his vacation home in Martha's Vineyard. A pregnant Adela takes a fall down the stairs and Trevor blames Sonny. He forces Adela to choose between her two sons, and Adela leaves with Sonny shortly after giving birth to Ric. However, Trevor told Ric that Adela abandoned them because of Sonny.

=== Storylines ===
On August 22, 2007, Trevor arrives in Port Charles. He is an attorney and the former lover of fashion mogul Kate Howard. After Kate tells Trevor about her pending legal woes, Trevor reveals to her that Ric, the prosecutor in the case, is his son and calls him "a disappointment". Sonny, who is now Kate's lover, sees Trevor as a major threat in light of Trevor's connections to Ric, Kate and mob boss Anthony Zacchara. On October 22, 2007, it is revealed Anthony has been insane for years and it is Trevor who has secretly been the actual head of the organization. Trevor puts a hit on Sonny but it fails.

Anthony's children, Johnny Zacchara and Claudia Zacchara, hate Trevor and blame him for their pain and anger towards their father. On March 22, 2008, Ric confronts his father about their strained past. Trevor ignores Ric's pain and instead convinces Ric to give him Ric's waterfront deeds. It is revealed on July 7 Trevor had an intimate relationship with Claudia when she was a teenager.

On February 9, 2009, Trevor and Sonny are injured in an explosion. On the roof of General Hospital, Sonny tries to shoot Trevor after Trevor threatens to drop the biotoxin, which would cause everyone in Port Charles to get sick. In a confrontation with Sam McCall, Trevor tosses the toxin and jumps off the roof, resulting in his death. Sam is able to catch the toxin ball.

== Reese Marshall ==
Reese Marshall
- General Hospital character
- Portrayed by: Kari Wührer
- First appearance: February 3, 2005
- Last appearance: November 15, 2005
- Created by: Robert Guza, Jr. Charles Pratt, Jr.
- Introduced by: Jill Farren Phelps
In-universe information
- Other names: Charlotte Reese "Carly" Roberts (birth name); Reese Sarah Tucker
- Occupation: Lawyer fbi agent
- Parents: Dan Roberts; Peyton Honeycutt
- Spouse: Evan Tucker
- Children: Jamie Tucker

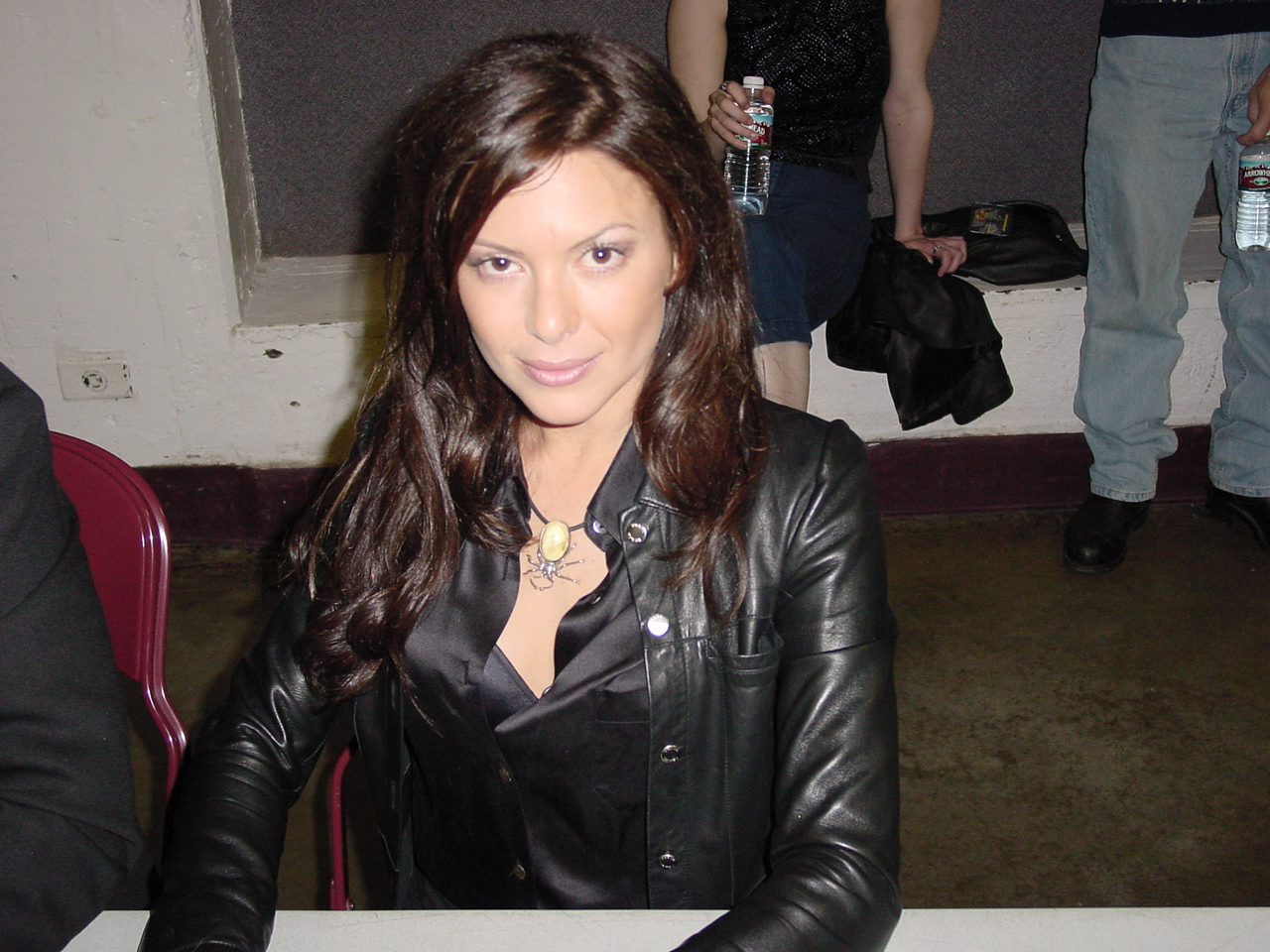
Kari Wührer portrayed Reese in 2005.

Reese Marshall (formerly Tucker, born Charlotte "Carly" Roberts) is a fictional character from the ABC daytime soap opera General Hospital. She was portrayed by Kari Wührer, who joined the series on February 3, 2005. In September 2005, Wuhrer was let go citing lack of story, she last aired on November 14, 2005 when her character died from complications in a train wreck. In January 2006, Wührer announced that she was suing General Hospital, claiming that she was fired because of her pregnancy. The case was resolved in December 2006.

=== Storylines ===
Reese Marshall was an FBI Agent who specialized in finding missing children. She came to Port Charles help find Sonny Corinthos' daughter Kristina Corinthos-Davis, who had been kidnapped. Federal prosecutor John Durant thought working to find Kristina would be the perfect opportunity for Reese to gather information on Sonny, which he could use to finally prosecute the mobster. Reese's priority, however, was to find Kristina. When Sonny's sons, Michael and Morgan. were also kidnapped, Reese helped to find Morgan and Kristina, but Michael was presumed dead. The kidnapper, Faith Rosco, was charged, but killed before she could face trial. Reese was then ordered to build a case against Sonny and his enforcer, Jason Morgan, and knew Durant was behind the order. Reese realized that she was falling for Sonny, but she reluctantly started building a case. However, she found out that Durant had been using corrupt and illegal methods to help Reese gather evidence. Reese resigned from the case, and gave Sonny the evidence she had found. She also let him know of her feelings. However, when she was leaving, her car exploded and she was injured. Sonny found her and brought her to a hospital. When Reese told Sonny about Durant, he helped her sneak out of the hospital and hide at his house. The two began a relationship.

Reese got the help of attorney Ric Lansing to build a case against Durant. Meanwhile, Michael was discovered to be alive with A.J. Quartermaine, his biological father. A.J. led Michael to believe that his mother, Carly, and Sonny had given him up, and Michael resented his parents, as a result. Reese was able to connect with him, and tried to help Michael get over his brainwashing. While A.J. was awaiting trial for kidnapping, he was murdered. Carly was a suspect, but Reese later suspected it was Michael when he described some nightmares he had about killing A.J. She told Sonny, who then confessed to A.J.'s murder to protect Michael. Sonny was exonerated, but Reese felt like he wasn't ready to move on from Carly, his ex-wife. She got drunk and had a one-night stand with Ric, Sonny's brother. However, Sonny changed his mind and told Reese he was ready to move on. She and Ric decided to keep their night together a secret, and parted as friends. Carly was not happy to see Sonny move on, and married Lorenzo Alcazar to spite Sonny. Reese got an unwelcome visit from her ex-husband, Evan Tucker. Reese blamed him for the death of their son, Jamie, and sent him to prison. Evan was bitter, and demanded Reese pay him off or he'd reveal her secrets. Before she could, Evan was killed by Ric. He confronted Reese over the fact that she was actually Charlotte Roberts, Carly's high school friend who was presumed dead in an accident. Ric agreed to keep her secret, but Carly wasn't going to back down. She was determined to find out what Reese was hiding, going so far as to break into Reese's apartment to find evidence.

Reese decided to confess the truth to Sonny about her identity, but Carly also found out the truth. Reese revealed that she and Carly had gotten into a fight in high school when Reese found out her father had slept with Carly. Reese believed Carly had seduced her father, but Carly argued she was a teenager and Reese's father had taken advantage. Reese was too hurt to see Carly's side, as their fight had led to the accident that nearly killed her, and eventually led to her father's death. Carly and Reese got into many arguments over it. Eventually, Reese apologized to Carly, realizing her father was the one who had been wrong, The two made peace, and Sonny and Reese went on with their relationship. Sonny, though, found out about Reese sleeping with Ric, and was furious. He walked out on her, upset over all her lies. Reese was on the Port Charles train when it crashed in the Glencoe tunnel. She was injured, and tragically died before paramedics could help her.

== Danny McCall ==
Danny McCall
- General Hospital character
- Portrayed by: Henri Lubatti (2004); David Greenman (2005–06)
- Duration: 2004–06
- First appearance: July 9, 2004
- Last appearance: May 2, 2006
- Created by: Robert Guza, Jr. Charles Pratt, Jr.
- Introduced by: Jill Farren Phelps
In-universe information
- Parents: Cody McCall; Evelyn Bass
- Siblings: Sam Morgan (adoptive)
- Nieces and nephews: Lila McCall (adoptive); Danny Morgan (adoptive); Emily Cain (adoptive)

Daniel "Danny" McCall is a fictional character on the popular ABC soap opera, General Hospital. He was portrayed by Henri Lubatti in 2004 and David Greenman from 2005 to 2006.

Danny is the brother of Sam McCall, and the son of con artist Cody McCall and Evelyn Bass. He is mentally handicapped due to being born with the Fragile X gene. His mental handicap was a burden to both his parents, and the only person who ever cared for him was Sam. Danny appears after Sam was arrested for the murder of Evelyn years before. It was later revealed that Danny was actually unintentionally responsible – he had accidentally started the fire that killed Evelyn when Sam rescued him from being locked up by Evelyn. Jason Morgan helped prove Sam's innocence, and Danny wasn't charged, due to his mental state.

To help Sam, Jason had Danny sent to a specialized school in Hawaii, where he could get the help he needs and the education Sam wanted him to get. Danny initially believed Sam had sent him away, and resented his sister. When Jason and Sam later came to Hawaii, Sam explained herself, and she and Danny made amends. Danny later came back to Port Charles to support Sam when she fell ill due to an encephalitis outbreak. Danny ended up falling ill, and was hospitalized with Sam. An antidote was made, but there was only enough for one patient. The choice was between Danny and Alexis Davis. The hospital chose to give it to Alexis, and Danny's health declined. He died with Sam by his side. Before dying, he unintentionally told Sam that she was actually adopted. Sam discovered her illegal adoption, and that her birth mother was Alexis. Sam hated Alexis, blaming her for Danny's death, and didn't want anything to do with her. Danny made a ghostly appearance when Sam was dying, and helped her choose between life and death. Sam survived, and built a relationship with Alexis and her newfound family. Years later, when Sam and Jason had a son, they named him Danny in memory of Sam's brother.

== Diane Miller ==
Diane Miller
- General Hospital character
- Portrayed by: Carolyn Hennesy
- Duration: 2006–
- First appearance: December 13, 2006
- Created by: Robert Guza, Jr.
- Introduced by: Jill Farren Phelps
- Book appearances: The Secret Life of Damian Spinelli
- Spin-off appearances: General Hospital: Night Shift
In-universe information
- Occupation: Columnist in the Port Charles Press; Lawyer; Partner in Mason, Petrovich, and Miller; Co-author of The Secret Life of Damian Spinelli

Diane Miller is a fictional character on General Hospital. She has been portrayed by Carolyn Hennesy since the character's debut on December 13, 2006.

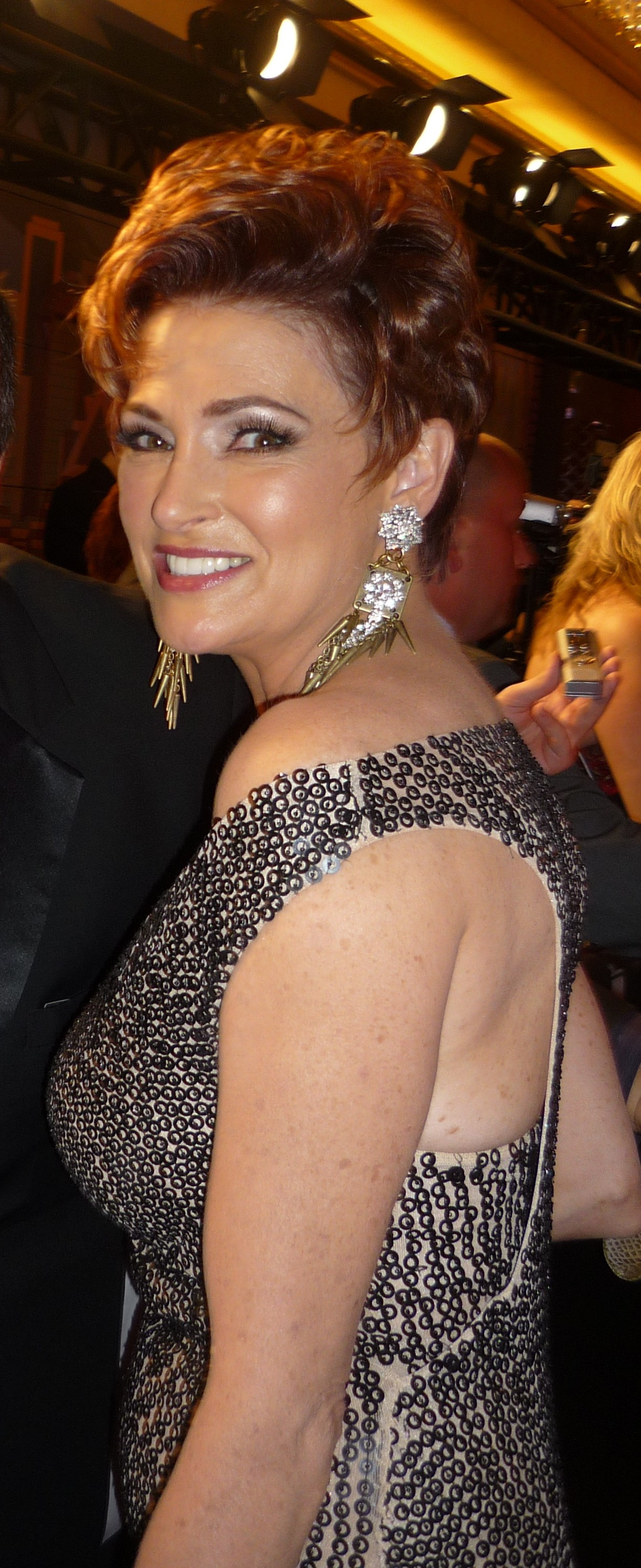
Hennesy in 2010

=== Casting ===
Carolyn Hennesy, who had previously played lawyers in other roles, was hired by casting director at the time Mark Teschner for a three-day job. In a 2009 interview, Teschner described Hennesy's success, explaining, "I knew it needed somebody special who had a certain charisma and presence and here it is, a couple years later, and she's one of the most major, non-contract players we've ever had, and an Emmy pre-nom two years in a row." Hennesy was named Best Supporting Actress by Michael Logan of TV Guide in 2007. Logan wrote, "Her category is inevitably hogged by leading ladies afraid to compete as best actress. But make no mistake: This is the supporting performance of the year." Soap Opera Digest named Hennesy and fellow actress Nancy Lee Grahn Performer of the Week in their February 12, 2008 issue.

In September 2012, after the character had been off-screen for several months, Hennesy announced she would be reprising the role.

=== Storylines ===
Diane Miller is a top-notch attorney hired to represent mobster Sonny Corinthos for the murder of Lorenzo Alcazar. She proves her skills, as Sonny is found innocent. Diane next defends Sonny's enforcer, Jason Morgan for Alcazar's murder after the Metro Court Hotel hostage crisis occurred by Jerry Jacks where she and district attorney and hostage negotiator Ric Lansing where worried sick and concerned for Sonny and the others' safety along with Michael, Morgan, and Kristina who were scared of Jerry. She succeeds in getting him acquitted, as well. Kate Howard, editor-in-chief of Crimson, has a mishap with a police cruiser, and Diane works a plea bargain with the prosecutor, getting Kate community service at the hospital. Diane's love of fashion and shoes lead her to become friends with Kate. Her occasional legal work for Kate is rewarded with sneak peeks at the latest fashion trends and free apparel. Diane became friends with fellow attorney Alexis Davis while they were representing Elizabeth and Lucky Spencer in their divorce. Though the two were often on opposite sides of trials, they kept their friendship intact.

Diane grew close to Sonny and Jason's extended families when she represented them and their family members in various trials. When Sonny's son, Michael, was shot and left in a coma by a bullet meant for Sonny, Diane was devastated. She got drunk and ended up sleeping with Max Giambetti, Sonny's main bodyguard who blamed himself for not protecting Michael. The two were discovered by Alexis, then by Sonny. Sonny forbid their relationship, but Max stood up to him. When Jason took over Sonny's organization, he let Max and Diane stay together as long as it didn't affect their work. Diane defended Alexis after she ran down Kiefer Bauer, the abusive boyfriend of Alexis' daughter, Kristina.

Diane was not happy when Sonny got involved with prosecutor Claire Walsh, warning him that it could end badly. Claire decided to join Diane's firm, but she later moved after Sonny broke up with her. Jason's computer genius friend, Damian Spinelli, discovered Diane had a second hidden career as a writer, and got her help to write a book about his alter ego, Jackal P.I., and his adventures. The success of the book became Diane's main focus, as she focused on publicizing and writing the novel. She got a job as a gossip columnist, and ended her relationship with Max. She eventually went back practicing law, but resigned as Sonny's attorney, handing the duties off to Alexis.

Following Edward Quartermaine's death, Diane reads his will to the Quartermaine family. Diane takes up new clients including Todd Manning, Silas Clay, Johnny Zacchara, A.J. Quartermaine, and Franco. Diane's change of heart has led Sonny, Spinelli, and Alexis, three of her good friends, to ask her why. Diane simply replies that everyone deserves good counsel. When Max was shot and hospitalized, Diane revealed that she still had feelings for Max, and the two reconciled. Diane decided to become Sonny's attorney again, and represented him and his family members, as well as Jason and his family. When Alexis faced legal trouble because of her husband, Julian Jerome, Diane defended Alexis, then represented her when she faced disbarment. The board suspended Alexis' law license, and Diane worked hard to help her friend get her license back. In 2020, Diane represents Michael in a custody battle against Nelle Benson over their son, which proves successful after Michael is given full custody, with Nelle not being allowed visits.

== Leyla Mir ==
Leyla Mir
- General Hospital character
- Portrayed by: Nazanin Boniadi
- Duration: 2007–09
- First appearance: July 5, 2007
- Last appearance: February 3, 2009
- Created by: Robert Guza, Jr.
- Introduced by: Jill Farren Phelps
- Spin-off appearances: General Hospital: Night Shift
In-universe information
- Occupation: Nurse
- Parents: Farah Mir

Leyla Mir is a fictional character that premiered on the SOAPnet drama series, General Hospital: Night Shift, and has crossed over into the parent series General Hospital. She was portrayed by Nazanin Boniadi.

Leyla begins her job as a student nurse at General Hospital and hopes one day to become a doctor. When Dr. Patrick Drake ends his relationship with Dr. Robin Scorpio, Leyla begins a romantic relationship with him. As their relationship progresses from purely physical, she accompanies him to a black and white ball thrown by Nikolas Cassadine in honor of his engagement to Emily Quartermaine. Homicidal mob boss Anthony Zacchara, who is obsessed with his son Johnny, terrorizes many of the guests. Seeing Leyla, who bears a remarkable resemblance to the wife Anthony murdered, forces the nurse to choose between the lives of Patrick and Robin. Leyla chooses for Anthony to shoot Patrick, but steps in front of the bullet at the last moment. While she is bleeding on the couch Patrick professes his love to Robin. He wants to get back together with the love of his life. The doctors are able to save her life, but despite her lodging herself in front of the bullet, Patrick and Robin reconcile. When Farah Mir, Leyla's domineering mother comes to Port Charles, Leyla pretends she is in a serious relationship with Dr. Leo Julian. When Leo is unable to attend a family wedding with her, Damian Spinelli steps in, and the two share a romantic attraction. Maxie Jones, who Spinelli is secretly in love with, warns the nurse not to pursue her best friend if she is going to hurt him, but the nurse hints at Spinelli's attraction to Maxie and makes no promises about a future relationship with him. In late January 2009, Leyla reveals that she is engaged. However, after an airborne biotoxin is released in an operating room in February 2009, Leyla dies from complications related to the poison. Patrick breaks the news to her fiancé, who is heartbroken.

== Coleman Ratcliffe ==
Coleman Ratcliffe
- General Hospital character
- Portrayed by: Blake Gibbons
- Duration: 2002–12; 2014
- First appearance: September 10, 2002
- Last appearance: August 25, 2014
- Created by: Megan McTavish
- Introduced by: Jill Farren Phelps
In-universe information
- Other names: Mitchell Coleman
- Occupation: Owner of "The Floating Rib"; Owner of "The Oasis"

Mitchell "Coleman" Ratcliffe is a fictional character on the popular ABC daytime drama General Hospital. Coleman has been portrayed by actor Blake Gibbons since 2002.

=== Casting ===
In 2002, Gibbons was originally hired for a six-week stint on General Hospital. Since then, Gibbons has appeared sporadically on a recurring status. As he explained to Soap Opera Digest in 2005, "Coleman just kind of slides in and out, like a harmonica in music. He weaves in and out when you least expect it."

=== Storylines ===
When Coleman arrives in 2002, he is the owner of a bar called The Oasis. One night a drunken A. J. Quartermaine runs his car into the bar. To keep Coleman from turning A.J. over to the police, A.J.'s then wife Courtney Matthews, agrees to work as a stripper for Coleman at one of his clubs. A short time later, A.J., not realizing that Courtney had already paid off their debt, sets fire to Coleman's bar. A.J.'s brother Jason Morgan pays Coleman off so that he will keep quiet, and threatens to frame Coleman for burning down his own bar. Coleman takes the pay off and uses the money to buy another bar, Jake's. Coleman's association with the Quartermaine family continues as he is later revealed to be Courtney's stalker. One night, after feeling that she is being followed, Courtney shoot her stalker, and Coleman ends up in General Hospital. Once he makes it through surgery, he tells Marcus Taggert that A.J. hired him to stalk Courtney, so that Courtney would stay with him and not move on to his brother Jason. Courtney leaves A.J. and becomes involved with Jason, but Coleman still makes plans to pursue her for himself.

After a drunken Skye Chandler runs down Nikolas Cassadine, Coleman covers for her and takes the blame for the crime. He plans to help Skye so that she will owe him a favor, and help him look like a better man in Courtney's eyes. As he attempts to blackmail Skye into helping him, the two eventually sleep together. When Luis Alcazar is murdered, a feverish Skye admits to Coleman that she thinks she killed him, and Coleman helps A.J. frame Brenda Barrett to protect Skye. Coleman then hooks up with Faith Rosco, who wants to use him as a means to get closer to Sonny Corinthos. While working for Faith, A.J. hires Coleman to take incriminating photos of Sonny and Faith. After his association with Faith ends, he is hired by Tracy Quartermaine to steal treasure from a ship named The Courage. A fire at the Port Charles Hotel ruins his plans, and Luke Spencer ends up with the treasure.

Next, Coleman is instrumental in helping Carly Corinthos find her birth father. When they learn that Carly's father is John Durant, a prosecutor known for his vendetta against the mob, Coleman helps Carly keep the news from her husband Sonny. He then has a brief affair with Tracy. Soon after, he agrees to take compromising photos of Nikolas Cassadine and Emily Quartermaine, so that Jasper Jacks could win back Courtney's love from Nikolas. When Courtney dies in 2006 from the encephalitis virus, Coleman grieves for her and attends her funeral to say goodbye.

Coleman has been shown to be good friends with Patrick Drake and often gives Patrick advice on how to handle his love life with Robin Scorpio. In 2008, Coleman serves as Patrick's best man at his October wedding to Robin. In late 2009, Coleman becomes involved with fashion icon Kate Howard and the two begin dating. In 2010, Coleman serves as a juror at Sonny Corinthos' trial for the murder of Claudia Zacchara, but is later dismissed due to his disruptive behavior.

Luke Spencer pays Coleman to change the name of Jake's to The Floating Rib. In 2013, Coleman sells The Floating Rib to Mac Scorpio.

== Faith Rosco ==
Faith Rosco
- General Hospital character
- Portrayed by: Cynthia Preston
- Duration: 2002–05
- First appearance: December 17, 2002
- Last appearance: October 3, 2005
- Created by: Robert Guza, Jr. Charles Pratt, Jr.
- Introduced by: Jill Farren Phelps
In-universe information
- Occupation: Mobster
- Husband: Mr. Rosco
- Grandparents: Catherine Flynn; Marco Flynn

Faith Rosco (maiden name Flynn) is a fictional character on the ABC soap opera, General Hospital. Cynthia Preston originated the role in December 2002 and portrayed the mafia princess until the character's death in 2005.

Faith Rosco arrived in Port Charles in late 2002 to take down rival mobster, Sonny Corinthos. She partnered up with Ned Ashton, who blamed Sonny for the death of Kristina Cassadine. Ned soon became fed up with her, and ended their partnership.

Rosco found a new partner in Sonny's new lawyer Ric Lansing. When Ric attempted to end his partnership with Faith, she did not want to let him go. Encouraged by their one night stand, Faith continued to pursue Ric, though he too rejected her advances at every turn. After realizing Ric had fallen in love and eloped with Elizabeth Webber, Faith tried to run her off. When she found out Elizabeth was pregnant, she tricked Elizabeth into a supposed meeting with Sonny. As Liz's back was turned, she pushed her down the stairs. Elizabeth had a miscarriage. Ric blamed Sonny.

Rosco continually tried to convince Ric he would not be happy with Elizabeth. She went as far as breaking into Ric and Liz's home to poison Liz. Elizabeth survived. Ric found out about what Faith did. He set her up to confess while the PCPD listened in. To avoid going to prison, Faith made a deal with the FBI to bring down Lorenzo Alcazar. Part of the deal was to pose as Sonny's mistress.

She turned on Sonny, and teamed up with Alcazar. The two planned to bring Sonny's ex-wife, Lily Rivera Corinthos, "back from the dead" to haunt him. The plan fell through. Faith began working on her own plan and at the next meeting of the five families, Faith had them all killed. She gloated about her accomplishment to Sonny until Sonny informed her Jason survived the shooting. Faith panicked and offered to work with him against Alcazar. Sonny refused and pulled out his gun – but he could not seem to pull the trigger.

Faith, next became involved with Luke Spencer, Skye Chandler, and their casino, The Haunted Star. After she won a poker game against Luke, she became a partner in the casino. Worried, Skye hired Justus Ward to protect Luke's ownership rights while he was out of town. It was revealed Justus and Faith had a past together. Justus had represented Faith's ex-boyfriend and they had an affair. Faith's ex was convicted and killed in prison. She believed Justus intentionally sent her boyfriend to jail so that he could be with her. Justus denied this.

Rosco went to Sonny to beg for her life. Through eavesdropping, she found he was the real father of Sam McCall's baby and planned to use it to her advantage. Sonny eventually came clean to his wife, Carly. Faith lost her leverage.

Rosco went to Alcazar to help her leave town. Alcazar secretly planned to blow up the yacht she was on and frame Jason and Sonny for her murder. Alcazar's plan failed when the PCPD found Faith alive in the harbor. She was arrested once again, and begged Justus to help her. Justus agreed, feeling the need to make up for their past. When a prison inmate stabbed Faith, she was rushed to General Hospital, and from there escaped. Justus hid her in the basement of the Quartermaine mansion. There, she confessed her love for Justus and they made love. Soon Faith met her end in March 2005 where she was shot and killed by an assassin hired by AJ Quartermaine. She later made appearances as hallucinations made by Carly Corinthos, during her severe mental breakdown.

== Rebecca Shaw ==
Rebecca Shaw
- General Hospital character
- Portrayed by: Natalia Livingston
- First appearance: January 15, 2009
- Last appearance: December 22, 2009
- Created by: Robert Guza, Jr.
- Introduced by: Jill Farren Phelps
In-universe information
- Occupation: X-Ray technician Waitress; Con-woman
- Father: Hank Bowen
- Mother: Paige Bowen
- Adoptive father: William Shaw (illegal)
- Adoptive mother: Nancy Shaw (illegal)
- Siblings: Emily Quartermaine
- Aunts: Corrie Bowen

Rebecca Amber Shaw is a fictional character on the ABC soap opera General Hospital. She was portrayed by Natalia Livingston, from January 15, 2009 to December 22, 2009, who previously portrayed Rebecca's twin sister, Emily Quartermaine from 2003 until 2008.

=== Casting ===
Actress Natalia Livingston portrayed Emily Quartermaine on General Hospital from April 2003 to May 2008. In December 2008, it was reported that Livingston would return to the series as a new character, Rebecca Shaw. She first appeared as Rebecca on January 15, 2009. Livingston said of making the decision to return as a new character, "What was really important to me was remembering my five years on the show and how happy I was. I know that this is a group of people I love to work with, that it's a job I know I love. Second to that, I thought this would be challenging because it's a new character. It's not a recast, like when I stepped into Amber Tamblyn's shoes [as Emily]. This is a chance to have something new and my own." She has also noted that Rebecca was a far more challenging role to play than Emily. A year after on screen, it was announced that Livingston would once again depart from the series.

=== Storyline ===
X-ray technician Rebecca Shaw arrives in fictional Port Charles, New York in January 2009. Local residents are shocked at her resemblance to Dr. Emily Quartermaine, who had been murdered over a year before. Rebecca becomes more evasive about her past as she meets Emily's inquisitive loved ones, including Emily's former fiancé Nikolas Cassadine. Though touched by the story of Nikolas and Emily's romance, Rebecca is put off by Nikolas' persistence. She meets his half-brother Lucky Spencer, who is the first person in town to ask her about herself. Rebecca and Lucky begin dating, which puts the brothers slightly at odds; Rebecca is also drawn to Nikolas, and they kiss.

Nikolas and his family begin to suspect that Rebecca was sent to Port Charles by someone to con him out of money. His aunt, Alexis Davis, accuses Rebecca of having had plastic surgery to look like Emily, and pulls back Rebecca's hair to reveal a scar; Rebecca explains that it is from a childhood injury, and storms out in a fury. Rebecca resumes her new relationship with Lucky, which irks Nikolas and drives him to kiss Lucky's ex-wife Elizabeth Webber in retaliation. Rebecca and Lucky stop short of having sex but Nikolas is left with the impression they have. Rebecca seeks out Nikolas and admits she is attracted to him. Alexis finds out Rebecca is Emily's twin sister, and was sold at birth by their parents, Hank and Paige Bowen, then illegally adopted by the Shaw family. Nikolas does not let this stop him from pursuing Rebecca. Though Rebecca acts surprised, it's revealed that she's running a con with grifter Ethan Lovett, hoping to get her hands on Emily's fortune. She has second thoughts about the plan, having fallen for Nikolas. However, Ethan exposes Rebecca's scheme to Lucky, who in turn tells Nikolas. Nikolas breaks up with Rebecca, as a result.

With a plan of revenge in mind, Nikolas soon starts dating Rebecca again. However, he's also falling for Elizabeth, who is dating Lucky, and is hoping Rebecca can distract him from his attraction. Not much later, Nikolas breaks off his relationship with Rebecca for good, telling her it was all an act. He discloses how, in a moment of regret about his plan to seduce her, he even offered Ethan money to take her away, but Ethan declined. Rebecca tried to win Nikolas back, but when she snuck into his home, she sees Elizabeth and Nikolas in the living room having sex. Finally understanding Nikolas does not care about her, she goes to the casino, where Ethan serves up drinks. Now intoxicated, she heads out, determined to tell Lucky the truth. But as she approaches Lucky's house, she steps into the street and gets hit by a car. The driver turns out to be Nikolas, who also had been rushing to Lucky's. He had looked away from the road momentarily because of his cell phone. Nikolas calls for help and apologizes to Rebecca, who spews anger at him. She tells Nikolas she saw him with Elizabeth and plans to tell Lucky. At General Hospital, the doctors weigh whether to operate, but the new chief of staff, Steven Webber, Elizabeth's brother, makes the decision they should wait. Lucky arrives to investigate and speaks with Rebecca, who confirms it was an accident and does not reveal her secret. Steven later goes to Rebecca's room to introduce himself and asks her to be kind to Elizabeth.

Rebecca tells Nikolas she has reconsidered telling Lucky about his sleeping with Elizabeth. Instead, she just wants to try to get Lucky interested in dating her again. Nikolas is fine with this, but Elizabeth is not. When Rebecca invites Lucky to play pool at Jake's. Elizabeth rushes there with Nikolas to get Lucky away to go Christmas tree shopping. Rebecca, who had been tempted to expose Elizabeth, decides not to interfere by telling her secret and to leave town before she changes her mind. She bids good-bye to the Quartermaines, saying she has decided to accept their offer to go abroad while they pay for her studies. Rebecca leaves Port Charles for Paris. Aboard the plane, she sits next to a man who introduces himself as Aaron. In a bizarre twist, Aaron looks exactly like Zander Smith, Emily's ex-husband. It is later mentioned that Rebecca had successfully settled into her life in Paris.

=== Reception ===
SoapNet included Rebecca and Emily on their list of Daytime's Best Doubles. In 2021, Richard Simms from Soaps She Knows put Rebecca on his list of the most hated soap opera characters, commenting that "Soon after arriving in Port Charles, the never-before-mentioned sister of General Hospital's Emily Quartermaine grew tired of everyone comparing her to her late twin (whom Natalia Livingston had played for five years). Less than a year later, that stopped being an issue when the character was shipped off to Paris, never to be mentioned again."

== Zander Smith ==
Zander Smith
- General Hospital character
- Portrayed by: Marc Brett (2000); Chad Brannon (2000–2021)
- Duration: 2000–2004, 2021
- First appearance: August 11, 2000
- Last appearance: March 16, 2021
- Created by: Robert Guza, Jr.
- Introduced by: Wendy Riche (2000); Frank Valentini (2021)
In-universe information
- Other names: Alexander Lewis (birth name)
- Occupation: Faith rosco's bodyguard drug dealer
- Father: Cameron Lewis
- Brothers: Peter Lewis
- Spouse: Emily Quartermaine (2003)
- Children: Cameron Webber

Zander Smith, originated by Marc Brett, made his first appearance on August 11, 2000. Following Brett's exit, the role was recast with Chad Brannon, who remained in the role until the character's exit on March 24, 2004. Brannon was nominated for the Daytime Emmy Award for Outstanding Younger Actor in a Drama Series in 2003 and won in 2004. In February 2021, it was announced Brannon would return to the soap; it was subsequently announced he would reprise the role of Zander for a guest appearance when he appears to his son, Cameron Webber (William Lipton).

=== Storylines ===
Zander breezed into Port Charles. Shortly after, he kidnapped Emily Quartermaine at gunpoint after she and her friends had set him up for killing an undercover cop. While on the run, Emily began to see a different side of Zander. They parted at the Canada–US border but Zander eventually returned to Port Charles, where he was arrested for killing the cop. Emily fought to help him prove his innocence and convinced Alexis Davis, who became like a mother to him, to represent him. Eventually Sorel, a known mob boss, was put on trial for the killing and found guilty, due to Zander's testimony.

Emily and Zander fell in love. He brought her pixi stix and climbed the window outside her bedroom to visit her. They made great plans for the future but those plans were halted when Emily was injured in a bus accident and sent away to rehab. Zander drifted for a while but became good friends with Elizabeth Webber, Carly Corinthos and Gia Campbell.

Zander's world was shattered by the return of his father, Cameron Lewis. Zander grew up as the unwanted second son, unable to compete with his older brother, Peter. He was desperate for his father's love and approval but unable to find a way to reach out. When Zander was a teenager, he, Cameron, and Peter, were on a hunting trip when Peter was shot and killed by a bullet from Zander's gun. Zander was wrecked with guilt believing he had killed his brother. Cameron later found out that Peter had actually committed suicide, but didn't tell Zander. Zander ran away from home and remained estranged from his parents until Cameron's arrival in Port Charles (Zander's mother had also died by then). Zander was reluctant to reconnect with his father and any chance for reconciliation was destroyed when Cameron confessed the truth about Peter. Zander and Cameron eventually formed a cordial relationship. Cameron was tragically killed in a fire originally caused by Edward, though history was later changed to implicate Zander.

When Emily returned, they got back together. They were happy for a short time until Emily developed breast cancer and pushed Zander away. Emily and her friend, Nikolas Cassadine pretended to be together to get Zander to leave Emily alone. When Emily confessed the truth, they reunited and got married. However, Emily had fallen in love with Nikolas. Their marriage ended after Zander caught Emily committing adultery with Nikolas on the floor of the cabin he'd bought for them. Until then, he'd believed the lies she told him about loving him and wanting to be with him. He threw his life away at that point and had a one-night stand with Elizabeth, which resulted in her getting pregnant. Elizabeth returned to her former husband, Ric Lansing during the pregnancy and asked Zander to sign away his parental rights so that Ric could adopt him. Feeling he had nothing left to lose, Zander agreed to this but insisted on payment for his agreement. Zander didn't live long enough to see the boy, however, as he was set up by Courtney Matthews and Jason Morgan to take the fall after Courtney shot a cop during one of Jason's mob battles. Courtney and Jason framed Zander to hide Courtney's own guilt. Zander was also being blackmailed by Ric Lansing, who wanted custody of Zander's unborn child. Ric told Zander he would see to it Zander went down for the murder of the cop unless he gave up the child. Zander continued to spiral further out of control, becoming more and more desperate as everyone in his life turned against him. In the end, Zander was gunned down by a SWAT team who thought he had taken Emily hostage and believed he was guilty of murdering Officer Beck. He chose his own death, pretending to reach for a gun after pushing Emily to safety. He died in Emily's arms. After his death, Elizabeth gave birth to their son, Cameron (after his father's death Zander had promised him he would name his son after him).

== Asher Thomas ==
Asher Thomas
- General Hospital character
- Portrayed by: Larry Poindexter
- First appearance: June 3, 2005
- Last appearance: August 8, 2005
- Created by: Robert Guza, Jr. Charles Pratt, Jr.
- Introduced by: Jill Farren Phelps
In-universe information
- Occupation: Psychiatrist at General Hospital

Asher Thomas is a fictional character from the ABC soap opera General Hospital, most notable for attempting to kill A. J. Quartermaine in 2005. He was played by Larry Poindexter.

=== Storyline ===
Dr. Asher Thomas first appears on-screen in 2005 as a psychiatrist at General Hospital. He is assigned to Michael Corinthos III's case after Michael's biological father A. J. Quartermaine kidnapped him, and later died by being smothered to death with a pillow. At first there is suspicion Michael may have killed A.J. Dr. Thomas uses hypnosis to try to bring back Michael's memory of that evening.

Some are skeptical of Dr. Thomas, especially Michael's uncle Jason Morgan. Dr. Thomas was one of Jason's doctors ten years earlier after he was in a car accident. It is shown through various flashbacks in 1996, A.J. hired Dr. Thomas to kill Jason while he was in a coma after the accident. The plan failed but A.J. had been blackmailing him ever since. A final flashback shows Dr. Thomas smothering A.J. to end the blackmail.

When Michael remembers him as the killer in one of his sessions, Dr. Thomas uses hypnosis to make him believe Rachel Adair was the killer, another doctor at the hospital whose body had recently been found with a suicide note. Jason is not convinced Rachel killed A.J. and is still suspicious of Dr. Thomas. He uses an experimental drug to try to regain his memory of when Dr. Thomas was treating him after his accident.

Slowly Jason, Sam McCall, Sonny Corinthos and Reese Marshall begin to put the pieces together and realize A.J. hired Dr. Thomas to kill Jason. Dr. Thomas killed A.J. and Rachel. They confront Dr. Thomas, who tries to make an escape by holding a syringe to Sam's neck. Right before he reaches a helicopter, he injects Sam and makes a run for it. However Jason arrives just in time to rush Sam to the hospital. Meanwhile, Dr. Thomas enters the Quartermaine mansion and ties Alan Quartermaine to a chair and tells Monica Quartermaine to get him out of town. Jason arrives. Dr. Thomas grabs Monica and takes her hostage, but Jason is able to shoot Dr. Thomas in the heart and he dies.

== Anthony Zacchara ==
Anthony Zacchara
- General Hospital character
- Portrayed by: Bruce Weitz
- Duration: 2007–2012
- First appearance: October 19, 2007
- Last appearance: July 26, 2012
- Created by: Robert Guza, Jr.
- Introduced by: Jill Farren Phelps
- Spin-off appearances: General Hospital: Night Shift
In-universe information
- Occupation: Mob boss
- Brothers: Rudy Zacchara
- Spouse: Dominica Zacchara; Maria Zacchara; Tracy Quartermaine (2012)
- Daughters: Claudia Zacchara
- Grandsons: Johnny Zacchara

Anthony Zacchara is a fictional character on General Hospital. Bruce Weitz originated the role on October 19, 2007. Anthony is the father of Claudia Zacchara and grandfather of Johnny Zacchara. He is a notorious mob kingpin. TV Guide praised Weitz for his portrayal in 2007.

=== Casting ===
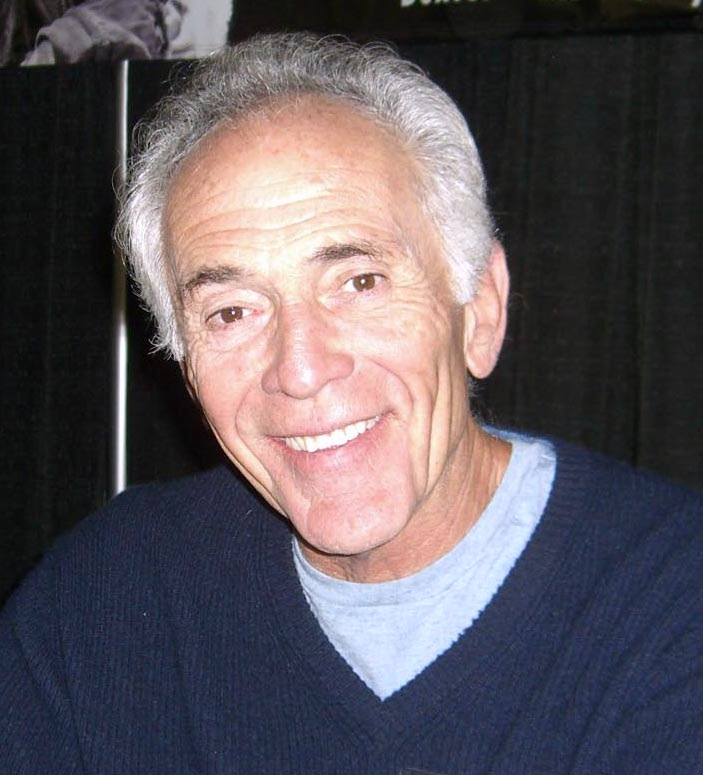
Weitz originated the role in 2007.

Bruce Weitz first appeared in the role of Anthony Zacchara on October 19, 2007. Previously Weitz was known for his Emmy award-winning role as Detective Mick Belker on hit NBC crime drama, Hill Street Blues. In February 2009, TV Guide reported that Weitz would be vacating the role after expressing his intention to retire from acting full-time. Weitz last appeared on March 2, 2009; however, he said would always be open to a future return. In late June 2009, it was announced that Weitz would return on July 9, 2009 and was last seen on November 24, 2009. Weitz reappeared for a handful of episodes in February 2010 to May 2010. Weitz once again reprised his role for a story arc on April 19, 2011 and was killed off on May 22, 2012 He appeared for several episodes afterwards as a hallucination.

=== Characterization ===
"For the last several weeks, the characters on General Hospital have been talking nonstop about Anthony Zacchara, a mobster so scary his mere name makes Port Charles crime boss Sonny Corinthos (played by Maurice Benard) shiver like a Chihuahua."

— TV Guide's Michael Logan

The character of Anthony is first described as "a homicidal maniac who goes beyond Tony Soprano in craziness". Weitz himself describes Anthony as his character to TV Guide's Michael Logan as being "out of his mind." He is also described as GH's "crack mobster". Weitz gives Anthony a "loud, bombastic characterization rife with humor" allowing the character to appear more evil and sinister. Weitz also adds some much-needed comic relief to the particularly gloomy soap.

Anthony's hatred for his daughter, Claudia (Sarah Brown) is a big part of the character's descent into madness prior to his appearance in the series. It is known that Anthony didn't have a happy life with Claudia's mother, Dominica, and his disdain for Claudia stems from her being so much like her mother. Anthony's hatred for Claudia is displayed when he doesn't show remorse after Claudia is murdered, and instead tries to recruit her killer, Michael Corinthos (Chad Duell) as a member of his crime organization.

=== Storylines ===
Crazy Mob Boss Anthony Zacchara arrived in November 2007. Anthony terrorized the guests at the Black and White Ball. He was later shot and paralyzed by Jason Morgan. He was later sent to Shadybrook. In January 2008, his lawyer Trevor Lansing called his daughter Claudia Zacchara to help his son Johnny Zacchara run the Zacchara organization. Anthony was later released from Shadybrook by Ric Lansing. Anthony is secretly able to walk and shoots Kate Howard at her and Sonny's wedding. Anthony offers Sonny control of his organization if he marrys his daughter Claudia Zacchara. Sonny declines the offer but later agrees. Claudia and Sonny get married at the Zacchara house in November 2008. Anthony revels to Ric that he plans for sonny to kill Jason and for himself to kill Sonny. Anthony plan fails when Ric tells Claudia his plan and Claudia later tells Sonny. Anthony kidnaps Claudia in March 2009 and straps a bomb to her. Sonny saves her and Anthony is sent to jail. In November 2009, Johnny visits Anthony in jail and tells him about Claudia's death. In April 2011 Anthony is released from prison and is living with Johnny. Anthony hires a hitwoman to kill Abby Haver's ex-boyfriend Brandon Lowell and frame her for the murder. Johnny and Michael later clear Abby of the charges. Anthony hides a fugitive Lisa Niles and convinces her to take people hostage at the hospital. Anthony kills Siobhan Mckenna in August 2011 to keep her quiet about his undercover drug ring which is later exposed by the PCPD. Anthony blackmails Tracy Quartermaine to marry him with the proof that she stole Gino Solieto's money after he died. Tracy and Anthony marry in January 2012. It is revealed that Johnny is really Claudia's son with Gino Soleito. At the Charity event in February 2012 at the Metro Court Sonny announces to everyone that Claudia was his mother. On February 24, 2012 Anthony's tires were shot out by who he believed to be Sonny Corinthos, but was revealed to be Johnny, his grandson. The accident resulted in a crash involving Starr Manning, Cole Thornhart and Hope Manning-Thornhart which resulted in the deaths of Cole and Hope. On May 22, 2012, Anthony was shot to death by Johnny Zacchara. He has appeared to Johnny many times since his death, taunting him that he will get what he deserves. His wife, Tracy Quartermaine found his dead body in her boathouse. She blamed Luke Spencer, because of him saying he would take Anthony out for her. When the cops come by the mansion, they put a hat and coat on him to make it look like he's sleeping. Luke and Tracy go inside to talk with Monica Quartermaine. When they return outside, Anthony's body is missing; it is later revealed that Heather Webber moved Anthony's body and buried it in the woods.
