= Nick Kiriazis =

American actor (born 1969)

- Born: June 9, 1969 (age 56); Madison, Wisconsin, U.S.
- Years active: 1996–2012

Nick Kiriazis (born June 9, 1969) is an American television actor.

He played Father Antonio Torres in Sunset Beach from February 1998 to December 1999. In June 2007, he temporarily replaced Rick Hearst for two episodes of General Hospital.

Kiriazis was born in Madison, Wisconsin.

== Filmography ==
=== TV Series ===
- Wings (1996)
- Beverly Hills, 90210 as Prince Carl
- George & Leo (1997)
- Sunset Beach (1998) as Father Antonio Torres
- Titans (2001) as Bryan
- V.I.P. (2001) as Damien Kane
- Boston Public (2001) as Mr. Landis
- Frasier (2002) as Clint
- Providence (2002)
- Charmed (2003) as Evan
- Numb3rs (2005) as Rob Evans
- CSI: NY (2007) as Prosecutor
- General Hospital (2007) as Ric Lansing (temporary recast)
- Law & Order: Los Angeles (2011) as George Patrick
- The Protector (2011) as Jason King

=== Movies ===
- Tin Cup (1996) as Guy At Bar
- Sunset Beach: Shockwave (1998, TV) as Father Antonio Torres
- Eventual Wife (2000) as Richard
- Laurel Canyon (2002) as Justin
- Wide and Open Spaces (2003) as Travis
- Back When We Were Grownups (2004, TV) as Joe
- The Food Chain: A Hollywood Scarytale (2005) as Devon Casey
- Widowmaker (2005) as Sean
- Primal Doubt (2007) as Travis Freeman
- Superhero Movie (2008) as Police Officer
- Desert Vows (2009) as Rich
- Matchmaker Santa (2012) as Bill Hogan
