= Jason Gerhardt =

American actor

- Born: April 21, 1974 (age 52); Austin, Minnesota
- Occupation: Actor

Jason Gerhardt (born April 21, 1974) is an American actor. He is known for playing the role of Cooper Barrett in General Hospital and Zack Kilmer in Mistresses. He temporarily took over the role of Eric Brady on Days of Our Lives in August, 2023.
