= Claudia Zacchara =

Fictional character from General Hospital

- General Hospital character
- Portrayed by: Sarah Brown (2008–2009); Uncredited actress (2010)
- Duration: 2008–2010
- First appearance: January 25, 2008
- Last appearance: November 4, 2009
- Created by: Robert Guza, Jr.
- Introduced by: Jill Farren Phelps
In-universe information
- Other names: Claudia Antonia Zacchara; Claudia Antonia Corinthos; Debra Jackson
- Occupation: Mob boss
- Parents: Anthony Zacchara; Dominica Zacchara
- Spouse: Sonny Corinthos (2008–09)
- Sons: Johnny Zacchara
- Uncles: Rudy Zacchara

Claudia Zacchara is a fictional character from the ABC soap opera General Hospital. Claudia is the daughter of New York City mob boss Anthony Zacchara. Claudia was portrayed by Sarah Brown beginning January 31, 2008. She left the role of Claudia on November 4, 2009, to join the cast of The Bold and the Beautiful, starting on November 5. Brown also originated the role of Carly Corinthos on General Hospital in 1996, leaving the series in 2001.

== Casting ==
With actress Laura Wright in the role of Carly, Brown returned to General Hospital in January 2008 as new character Claudia. Having previously won three Daytime Emmy Awards and two Soap Opera Digest Awards for her portrayal of Carly, Brown stated that a chance encounter with executive producer Jill Farren Phelps had precipitated discussions about her return to the series, and that they had never considered her reprising Carly. Initially contracted for a one-year run, Brown later re-signed for another year, citing both financial motives and her desire "to learn more about Claudia."

== Characterization ==
With Claudia debuting during the 2007–08 Writers Guild of America strike, Brown noted in January 2008 that striking head writer Bob Guza had outlined the character beforehand. Brown previewed her role as the daughter of Anthony Zacchara, played by Bruce Weitz, that "has a soft spot, because she's being played by me. (Laughs) [...] She's a very, very sexual woman. That's what I'm gathering. There are some really wonderful reasons for that. Like any tough cookie she's tough because she's really fragile, and she's really fragile because she has an Achille's heel." The strike ended a month after Brown started, and in December 2008 she acknowledged that the change in writers due to the strike had made Claudia "inconsistent" in that "half the things the writers had set up for me [ultimately] were changed ... you've made choices that don't work anymore and you're suddenly saying things that contradict what you did earlier."

Paired again with former co-star Maurice Benard (who plays Carly's ex- and Claudia's current husband Sonny Corinthos), Brown compared Claudia's dynamic with Sonny to Carly's:

Carly was a more outwardly insecure character who was always professing feelings of love and devotion to perfect strangers and people she identified with right away. She was more open, so she had much more drama on the table on a regular basis. Working with Maurice now, we want to keep things hidden under the surface, to make a bit more work for the audience to figure out what's going on. That's what they do in nighttime [television]. It's more interesting when you're not spoon-fed.

Of the then-developing storyline that found Claudia trying to get pregnant by Sonny to protect herself from his wrath over her part in the shooting of his son Michael, Brown dismissed the idea that Claudia was "desperate":

"I refuse to play a needy woman who relies on a pregnancy to save her life. Trust me — it won’t go there ... it’s not why I signed on to this show again. And I don’t think Bob [Guza] sees that kind of desperation in Claudia or myself. It’s not a road either of us are interested in traveling down. It’s also not what I do well. I like to think Claudia and I are a little more dimensional than that. Look, she ran the mafia in Italy with her uncle Rudy. She’s one of the guys. In many ways, she flourishes more in a man’s world than the men do ... Who wants to see a needy girl sit there, desperate for love from a man? There must be more dynamics in this relationship".

At that time she called Claudia and Sonny's relationship "sick and twisted," suggesting that "once Claudia has his baby, perhaps love will blossom, but right now, I don’t think there’s a lot of love there." She added, "I don’t think Claudia would behave this way if she was in love with Sonny. I’m holding out hope that they will fall in love and fans will see that journey on camera." Calling Claudia's hiring of the hit man who accidentally shot Michael "a stupid move on Claudia’s part," Brown noted that the character "feels very guilty over her actions." The actress also voiced her interest in seeing how the writers would get Claudia out of this situation and how Sonny would forgive her.

== Storylines ==
=== 2008–09 ===
Claudia is summoned to Port Charles in January 2008 by mob lawyer Trevor Lansing in the hope she can assert some control over her wayward younger half-brother, Johnny Zacchara. Mentally unstable mob boss Anthony had divorced Claudia's outspoken mother Domenica and kept custody of their daughter out of spite. After a 16-year-old Claudia had seduced Trevor, Anthony had sent her to Milan, Italy to be raised by his brother Rudy. Now Trevor, who has been secretly running the now fully insane Anthony's illegal operations for years, is surprised to find Claudia, once a "gangly and awkward teen," is now a strong and vicious woman bent on taking over the Zacchara empire. Claudia and Sonny Corinthos meet anonymously in a bar and end up in bed.

Soon after, Claudia realizes Sonny's identity, knowing he is "her chief rival for control over Port Charles." When Sonny learns who Claudia is and she makes her intentions for Port Charles known, the battle lines are drawn. Sonny rejects her further sexual advances, and leaves her for dead after an explosion. Claudia hires Jerry Jacks and Ian Devlin to kill Sonny; in the attempt, a bullet hits Sonny's son Michael instead, and the boy ends up in a coma. Jerry stabs Claudia on May 15, 2008 to cover his involvement in the shooting, and then kicks her into the river. She washes up on the beach and is found by Nikolas Cassadine. Nikolas takes care of her, and while delirious she accidentally admits she had hired Ian to kill Sonny; Nikolas threatens to tell Sonny's second-in-command Jason Morgan unless Claudia turns herself in. Nikolas ultimately allows Claudia to leave without reporting her to the police because she is aware he had paid Devlin $10 million for drugs. Anthony makes a sudden recovery and is finally released from his mental institution, immediately shutting Claudia out of the business. Weeks later, he gives his daughter the opportunity to gain status in the mob family when she is quarantined with Jason Morgan and Damien Spinelli: if she can kill Jason, he will allow her back into the business. Claudia's attempt fails.

Johnny's girlfriend Lulu Spencer kills her ex-boyfriend Logan Hayes in self-defense; to protect her, Johnny tells Claudia he had done it himself. Claudia dumps the body on the street trying to make it look like a hit-and-run, but Johnny is later arrested. Logan's estranged father Scott Baldwin — the prosecuting attorney in Johnny's trial — fabricates documents claiming Logan was a police officer in order to make Johnny's potential sentence the death penalty. To save Johnny, Claudia perjures herself on the stand, testifying he killed Logan to stop him from raping her. Johnny is found not guilty.

Claudia sleeps with Sonny's brother, Ric Lansing, who begins falling in love with her. Anthony tells Sonny if he wants to gain control of the Zacchara organization, he must marry Claudia. Sonny himself has a plan to use the union to destroy Anthony, and he and Claudia marry in December 2008. Claudia — though falling for Sonny and feeling guilty about Michael's condition — insists to Johnny she is using her position as Sonny's wife to protect them from suspicion in Michael's shooting, but Johnny fears she will somehow lead Sonny to the truth about their involvement. Claudia receives a DVD from the presumably dead Jerry revealing her role in the shooting, several copies of which he has hidden in the Corinthos mansion.

Claudia tells Sonny about her father's role in the shooting of Kate Howard, and gives Sonny information that allows him to freeze Anthony's off-shore bank accounts. Prevented from fleeing to Brazil, a furious Anthony kidnaps Claudia on February 25, 2009, threatening to kill her unless Sonny brings him $20 million. Sonny arrives with the money, but finds Claudia tied to a bomb and rescues her. Sonny and Claudia later make love. Ric and Jasper Jacks learn Claudia is responsible for Michael's shooting. Ric decides to blackmail her with the information. Though she does not want children, Claudia becomes pregnant by Sonny in order to stay alive should he discover the truth. Sonny initially throws Claudia out after Ric suggests he may be the baby's father, but Sonny eventually allows her to stay until the baby's paternity is confirmed. An amniocentesis later proves the baby is Sonny's. On her way to tell him, Claudia is accidentally run off the road by Sonny's daughter Kristina Davis, and miscarries the baby. She contacts Jerry Jacks in the hospital to get him to track down Michael and Kristina, who ran away from home. They are eventually found by Jason and Sam.

On September 8, 2009, Claudia and Sonny go to the carnival with the kids. While Claudia shares a carnival ride with Molly and Kristina, a drugged Edward Quartermaine drives into the fair, killing and injuring several people. After the accident, Kristina is missing until Michael finds her unharmed under a pile of rubble. While on a business trip to Puerto Rico with Sonny, Claudia holds her own against rival mob bosses, and an impressed Sonny decides to throw his wife a lavish birthday party at the Metro Court Hotel.

Jason and Sam McCall are able to find proof Claudia was responsible for Michael being shot, and Jason reveals the truth to Sonny. At the celebration, Sonny alerts all of the guests to Claudia's culpability and verbally rips her to shreds. Backed into a corner, Claudia panics and kidnaps a pregnant Carly. As Carly goes into premature labor, Claudia steals a car. Fearing Claudia intends to take her daughter, Carly causes the car to crash, and while Claudia is unconscious, makes her way to a cabin to deliver her daughter. Claudia tracks Carly down and helps her give birth, but, having suffered a complete mental breakdown, became fixated on the baby and refused to hand her over to Carly. Michael is able to track the two to the cabin, and in order to protect his mother and newborn sister, hits Claudia in the head with an axe handle, accidentally killing her instantly. After Jason and Sam evacuate Carly, baby Josslyn, and Michael, Jason returns and burns the cabin down before burying Claudia's body in the woods.

Soon after, a mysterious photographer, obsessed with Jason, has a model pose as Claudia's corpse and photographs her in the position Claudia died in.

=== Post-mortem ===
On January 29, 2010, Sonny was arrested for Claudia's murder, following semi-doctored evidence supported by Dominic Pirelli (it was revealed on that night to Sonny that Dominic was actually Dante Falconeri, his son with Olivia). The adults in Michael's life arranged for him to leave the country until the trial ended to prevent him from confessing. Diane Miller defended Sonny, while federal prosecutor Claire Walsh was hired by Jasper Jacks to assure Sonny's conviction. Both sides resorted to ethically questionable tactics to this end: Diane encouraged Maxie Jones to perjure herself and knowingly accepted Carly's bogus, albeit convincing, testimony, while Claire, assuming that Michael's testimony would ensure Sonny's conviction, did everything in her power to find him, going so far as to force Claudia's brother Johnny to lie on the stand that Sonny routinely beat and abused Claudia, and to pull Morgan Corinthos out of school under false pretenses without his parents' knowledge to testify.

After being pressured by Claire for months, Dante found Michael, who was hiding out on Sonny's private island. Michael tells Dante that he killed Claudia, not Sonny, and showed evidence to support his "confession". As Sonny's verdict was to be served, Dante enters and surrendered Michael as Claudia's true killer. Michael was placed on the stand and forced to confess, exonerating Sonny. Though Dante had believed that Michael would be given a lenient sentence, Judge Carroll instead sentenced Michael to two-to-five years in Pentonville Adult Correctional Facility to punish everyone for their role in the cover-up and to punish Diane and Claire specifically for their courtroom antics. However, Dante and Claire, guilt-ridden over their roles in Michael's incarceration, eventually convinced the judge to let Michael go early.

Because Sonny treated Claudia so poorly when she was alive, Johnny has vowed to destroy Sonny's empire to avenge his sister, though he eventually proctored a peace agreement with Sonny. His love for and memory of Claudia eventually led to him reaching out to the similar Lisa Niles in an attempt to redeem her, only for him to discover the hard way that Lisa was too far gone to help.

On January 23, 2012 Sonny revealed to Johnny that he is Claudia's son with Gino Soleito and not Claudia's brother.

== Reception ==
Calling Brown's return to General Hospital as a new character "one of the most unusual moves in soap-casting history," Nelson Branco of TV Guide Canada noted that while her debut was heavily promoted by ABC, "the writers’ strike interfered with the ill-conceived character's journey." In an April 2009 interview, Brown agreed with Branco's opinion that "it was a huge error to pair [Brown] romantically with Maurice Benard initially and then spin off the two characters into different galaxies."
