= Derk Cheetwood =

American film and television actor

- Born: October 8, 1973 (age 52); Bowling Green, Ohio, U.S.
- Occupations: Film and television actor
- Years active: 1993–present
- Spouse: Cari Costner (m. 2006)
- Relatives: Drew Cheetwood (brother); Tyler Christopher (cousin)

Derk Cheetwood (born October 8, 1973) is an American film and television actor. He is best known for playing Max Giambetti, the bodyguard of Sonny Corinthos and Jason Morgan, in the American soap opera television series General Hospital from 2002 to 2018 and again in 2020.

== Life and career ==
Cheetwood was born in Bowling Green, Ohio, the son of Douglas Cheetwood. He is the brother of Drew Cheetwood, an actor. He attended Bowling Green High School, graduating in 1992. He began his screen career in 1993, appearing in the NBC sitcom television series Running the Halls, playing cocky football player Howser in an episode. In 1995, he appeared in the NBC sitcom television series Brotherly Love.

Cheetwood guest-starred in television programs including JAG, Desperate Housewives, Ally McBeal, 3rd Rock from the Sun and The Mentalist, and played the recurring role of Lt. Pete Norris in the TNT action drama television series The Last Ship. He also appeared in films such as U-571, Frailty and The Postman. In addition to his film and television appearances, he played Max Giambetti, the bodyguard of Sonny Corinthos and Jason Morgan, in the ABC soap opera television series General Hospital from 2002 to 2018 and again in 2020.

== Personal life ==
In 2006, Cheetwood married Cari Costner, the niece of Kevin Costner, an actor and film director. He was the cousin of Tyler Christopher, an actor. His cousin died in 2023.
