= Chad Brannon =

American actor

Chad Brannon is an American actor. Brannon is recognized for his role as Zander Smith on General Hospital.

== Career ==
In 2000, Chad Brannon started playing Zander Smith on the daytime soap opera General Hospital. He played the character from 2000 to 2004, until he was killed off, and won a Daytime Emmy Award for Outstanding Younger Actor in a Drama Series in 2004. He has also guest starred on Friday Night Lights, Cold Case, and Deadwood. Another of his roles includes Tolten from the Xbox 360 RPG Lost Odyssey. In 2008, FOX brought on Chad as one of the main network announcers covering many of their hit shows such as The Simpsons, Family Guy, Glee, Sons of Tucson, American Dad, and The Cleveland Show.

On December 22, 2009, Brannon returned to General Hospital, in a cameo as a character known only as Aaron. He appeared alongside Natalia Livingston, who was playing the twin of her previous character. In February 2021, Entertainment Weekly reported Brannon had returned to General Hospital in an undisclosed role. Brannon appeared on the March 16, 2021 episode as the "ghost" of Zander, interacting in scenes with Zander's son, Cameron.

== Filmography ==
Film
Year	Film	Role	Notes
1999	Killing the Badge	CIA Agent #3	
2007	Lost Odyssey	Tolten	as Chad Brandon
Television
Year	Title	Role	Notes
1999	Walker, Texas Ranger	Chris	1 episode
2000	General Hospital	Zander Smith; Aaron	257 episodes, 2000–2004, 2021; 1 episode, 2009
2000	Malcolm in the Middle	Cadet	1 episode
2000	Undressed	Stan	3 episodes
2000	JAG	Young Hoskins	1 episode
2000	Days of Our Lives	Boy #1	3 episodes
2006	Deadwood	unknown	1 episode
2006	Cold Case	Skiz	1 episode
2006	What It Takes	unknown	25 episodes, 2006–2007
2006	Friday Night Lights	Lucas Mize	2 episodes, 2006–2007
