= Matt Marraccini =

American actor (born 1981)

- Born: May 12, 1981 (age 45); Poland, Ohio, U.S.

Matt Marraccini (born May 12, 1981 in Poland, Ohio) is an American actor.

Marraccini made a guest spot on future General Hospital costar Kirsten Storms' now canceled CBS show Clubhouse. He has starred in two movies, Death Valley: The Revenge of Bloody Bill in 2004, and Believers Among Us in 2005.

He played undercover cop Jesse Beaudry on General Hospital beginning in June 2005 but was let go from the soap after only a year. Jesse was killed off in 2006.

== Television filmography ==
- General Hospital as Jesse Beaudry (29 June 2005 – 31 March 2006)
