= Johnny Zacchara =

Fictional character from General Hospital

- General Hospital character
- Portrayed by: Brandon Barash
- Duration: 2007–2016
- First appearance: September 18, 2007
- Last appearance: January 26, 2016
- Created by: Robert Guza, Jr.
- Introduced by: Jill Farren Phelps (2007); Frank Valentini (2014)
- Book appearances: The Secret Life of Damian Spinelli
- Spin-off appearances: General Hospital: Night Shift
In-universe information
- Other names: John Anthony Zacchara
- Occupation: Co-owner of "The Haunted Star" (2012–2013, 2015); Owner of "Vaughn's" (2011–2012); Mob boss (2009–2012, 2014–2016)
- Family: Soleito; Zacchara
- Parents: Gino Soleito; Claudia Zacchara
- Half-brothers: Gino Soleito, Jr.
- Half-sisters: Carla Soleito; Gina Soleito
- Spouse: Connie Falconeri (2012–13)
- Grandparents: Anthony Zacchara; Dominica Zacchara
- Uncles: Ray Soleito
- First cousins: Tony Soleito; Joey Soleito

Johnny Zacchara is a fictional character on the ABC soap opera General Hospital and the contract role was portrayed by Brandon Barash from September 18, 2007, until May 3, 2013. He returned on December 5, 2014. He is the son of Claudia Zacchara (originally believed to be his sister) and Gino Soleito. Until its reveal in 2012, he was believed to be the son of mobster Anthony Zacchara, who turned out to be his biological grandfather.

== Conception ==
=== Casting ===
Brandon Barash first appeared in the contract role of Johnny Zacchara on September 18, 2007. Barash revealed that he auditioned for the role with costar Julie Marie Berman (Lulu Spencer).

In the spring of 2012 rumors began circulating that Barash had been let go from the series. The speculation was so strong that some of Barash's own cast mates began to express concern and support when fans started a petition to save the actor's job on Twitter. The show's newly installed executive producer, Frank Valentini later took to Twitter himself to dispel the rumors of Barash's firing. After almost a year of denying rumors, Barash revealed at a fan event in late January 2013 that he had filmed his last scenes. Barash finally confirmed his departure via Twitter on March 5, 2013.

On November 10, 2014, representatives at ABC confirmed Barash's return to the series in an unknown capacity, though, believed to be a story-dictated arc return. He returned to the show on December 5, 2014, and he later finished his stint on February 10, 2015.

In October 2015, it was announced that Barash will return once again to the series, airing on December 8, 2015. Barash vacated the role of Johnny once again on January 26, 2016.

=== Characterization ===
It's hard to have a good relationship with your father when the guy tried to kill you. Johnny lost his mother at age nine when she saved him from being shot by his unstable father, Anthony. Now finally free of his sheltered life, he's determined to put his toxic family legacy behind him, no matter what the cost. Did we mention he defines the term "bad boy"?

Upon his introduction in 2007, the character of Johnny is described as the volatile loose cannon son of mob boss, Anthony Zacchara (Bruce Weitz). The handsome, troubled, Johnny, described as a "bad boy with a good heart" is torn between staying loyal to his family and trying to maintain a sense of normalcy so that he can have a love life. During an interview with BuddyTV, Barash admitted that playing Johnny often felt like playing two roles. "There are so many layers to Johnny. You see one thing on the exterior, but there's so much going on underneath all that." An interview with Soap Town USA listed the similarities between Barash and his character as "handsome, driven, well-layered and well-spoken." Barash also described Johnny as "brooding" and that Johnny always carries the weight of the world on his shoulders. As of 2008, Barash observed Johnny as being "volatile" and almost "childish" in a lot of ways. Johnny is both sure and unsure of what he wants in life.

== Storylines ==
Johnny Zacchara arrives in Port Charles and meets Lulu Spencer and the two begin a flirtatious relationship. His guardian is his father's lawyer, Trevor Lansing, who covered up the fact that Johnny's father Anthony murdered his mother Maria because Anthony was jealous of the bond between mother and son. Although Lulu's friends disapprove, they continued to see each other, and Johnny proved his love for her when he protected her against his father at the Black and White Ball.

After Anthony is paralyzed, Johnny takes the throne of the Zacchara empire, until Trevor calls upon Johnny's sister Claudia to town, and the siblings join forces and fight Sonny Corinthos's organization, which leads to Lulu being caught in dangerous situations.

Lulu breaks up with Logan and hooks up with Johnny, despite Claudia's disapproval. As friction develops between the two organizations, Johnny and Claudia arrange for Sonny to be shot but Sonny's son, Michael, is shot in the crossfire, leading the siblings to cover up the botched hit.

Johnny and Claudia lose hold of the empire when their father returns from his incarceration in an asylum. Soon after, Lulu kills Logan in self-defense and Johnny and Maxie cover it up as Johnny tells Claudia it was him who killed Logan. When put on trial, Johnny is threatened with the death penalty, and Claudia perjured herself on the stand, resulting in Johnny's acquittal.

Although Lulu is put in a mental health facility, the couple continue to bond but Johnny continually "treats her like a fragile piece of glass", a perspective that led to ending their relationship. Although Claudia marries Sonny as a business deal that Johnny disapproves, he soon learns that she is pregnant with Sonny's son and that as long as she is, Sonny can't hurt her if he learns of her involvement in Michael's shooting. As retaliation for Claudia marrying Sonny, he dates Sonny's friend and ex, Olivia Falconeri, despite Claudia and Sonny's disapproval. After leaving the mob once, he returns to the Corinthos organization as a favor for Claudia. The chemistry he shared with Olivia proved to be genuine and he fell passionately in love with her, despite objections from Sonny and Claudia. When Michael Corinthos kills Claudia to save his newborn sister, Johnny believes Sonny is the person who killed her. He also discovers Olivia's son Dante Falconeri is an undercover cop posing as Dominic Perelli, a member of Sonny's criminal organization. Johnny also learns that Sonny is Dante's father, and when Sonny shoots Dante, Johnny helps comfort Olivia while he recovers.

When Sonny is put on trial for the murder of Johnny's sister Claudia (Sonny's wife), Johnny takes the stand in order to push Sonny's buttons and show his abusive side. He testifies to Sonny's continual verbal abuse towards Claudia, particularly on the night of her death, and says that Claudia was constantly in fear of him. After Sonny's son Michael Corinthos confesses, Sonny is released and Johnny begins his rampage against Sonny's organization; stealing his allies, his shipments and his money in order to provoke him and torture him or what he did to Claudia.

Sonny's daughter Kristina Davis starts to harbor great resentment toward her father, blaming him for Michael being sent to prison. She recruits Johnny to pretend that they are going out and are sexually intimate as a way to torment her father. Johnny soon realizes that Kristina is going too far, and convinces her to end the charade, telling her that she doesn't hate Sonny as much as she says, and that she is making the same mistakes Claudia did. As Johnny is about to take Kristina home, the two are caught in a car bomb planted by Max and Milo on Sonny's orders; fortunately, both survive with minimal injuries, and Johnny vows to stay away from Kristina.

On August 27, 2010, Sonny shoots Johnny in self-defense, but Detective Ronnie Dimestico hides Johnny's gun to make it appear as though Sonny had tried to kill him. However, Jason and Dante find proof that Johnny was attacking Sonny. On September 14, 2010, Sonny and Johnny finally proctor a peace agreement.

On December 3, 2010, Johnny shoots someone working for Jerry Jacks, before being shot by Jason. He has Ethan get Lisa Niles to save him. Johnny blackmails Lisa with the syringe she used to try to kill Robin so that she will help him with his gunshot wounds.

On January 26, 2011 Johnny is beat up by Shawn Butler, one of The Balkan's mercenaries. He is found by Lulu and she takes him to his apartment. On February 21, Johnny and Lisa had sex in his apartment for the first time. Eventually, fed up with Robin and Lisa's constant squabbling over the syringe, Johnny calls them both to his apartment and arranges a scavenger hunt for it. When Lisa's search nearly causes her to lose her job at General Hospital and delays her greatly, she turns to Johnny for help. Johnny, however, reveals that it wasn't really about the syringe, but to try to get her to finally get over her obsession with Patrick and move on with her life. When Patrick finds out about this, he insists to Johnny that Lisa is too far gone to be helped and just as deranged as Claudia.

On April 22, 2011 Johnny finds his father Anthony Zacchara out of prison and living in his apartment. In May 2011 Johnny helps Michael and his girlfriend Abby Haver find the hitwoman his father ordered to kill Abby's ex-boyfriend Brandon. On June 9, 2011 Johnny agrees to help Lisa (who is on the run for the attempted murder of Robin Drake) get out of the country to start her life over. Johnny later learns that Lisa has taken people hostage at the hospital and learns his father Anthony Zacchara help her to do so.

Johnny has also begun pushing Ethan Lovett to admit that he has feelings for Kristina. He still taunts Sonny whenever he catches them together which has caused Sonny to pull a gun on him and almost kill him until Olivia intervenes. In November 2011 Johnny begins to flirt with PCPD detective Delores who is investigating the murder of Lisa Niles. Johnny and Anthony argue over Claudia on the anniversary of her murder.

On January 23, 2012 Sonny reveals to Johnny that he is really the biological son of Gino Soleito and that Claudia, whom he'd spent his whole life believing was his sister, was actually his biological mother. At the charity event in February 2012 at the Metro Court, Sonny announces to everyone that Claudia was Johnny's mother. Sonny is arrested for shooting out Anthony Zacchara's tires, causing the car accident that killed Cole Thornhart and Hope Manning. Johnny agrees to help Detective Delores Padilla find her sister's killer in exchange for information on the case, and also blackmails Steve Webber with what he did in Memphis. In March 2012 Johnny begins a sexual relationship with Carly Corinthos Jacks and in April 2012 the couple goes public with their relationship. However, Johnny sleeps with Connie (Kate's alternate personality) while Sonny walks in and later Carly. Carly, betrayed by Johnny, seduces Sonny, but Sonny backs off. Sonny tells Carly he thinks there is more to the story with Kate. Carly later dumps Johnny. Later on, Johnny buys a recording contract for Starr after Starr reveals her original producer was a crook and used the money from the record deal for adult films. Johnny shoots and kills Anthony after revealing that Johnny was the one who caused the accident that killed Hope and Cole and had Kate's alter Connie take the fall. After a long time of giving Carly roses and flowers, Johnny gives her a nice, expensive bracelet that Carly had shown him, and with a lot of thought, Carly finally forgives him. In his head, he can hear his dead father, Anthony, talk to him and is going a bit crazy after he buys half of The Haunted Star for a night club, a partnership with his ex-girlfriend, Lulu. Carly says once there's a special bond between two people, it never really goes away, but she knows he really wants this night, and she really trusts him, but Lulu's police officer husband is not happy with it. Johnny is now being haunted by Anthony Zacchara and Hope Manning-Thornhart for their deaths (he shot Anthony point blank and got rid of his corpse, and killed Hope -along with her father- when he shot out Anthony's tires). Kate's alter Connie blackmails Johnny into marrying her and announces it at Sonny and Kate's wedding in October 2012. Johnny confessed to the murder in January 2013 and revealed that Todd switched Sam Morgan's baby with Tea Delgado's. Johnny is sentenced to 20 years in Pentonville Penitentiary but before being transferred he gives Starr Manning his share of the Haunted Star.

== Reception ==
Brandon Barash ranked at #9 on Daytime Confidential's list of the "Top 10 Newcomers of 2007." The post applauded Barash for being one of the most talented newcomers and sharing chemistry with all of his costars. In July 2008, Barash ranked at #25 on TV Guide's list of "Soap's Sexiest Men."
