= List of Port Charles characters =

The following is a list of characters who appeared on the ABC daytime soap opera Port Charles, which ran from 1997 to 2003. The series was created by Carolyn Culliton, Richard Culliton, and Wendy Riche. It is a spin-off of the serial General Hospital, which has been running since 1963, created by Frank and Doris Hursley, who set it in a general hospital (hence the title), in an unnamed fictional city. In the 1970s, the city was named Port Charles, New York.

== A ==
=== Danielle Ashley (Deceased) ===
(Renee Griffin, 1997)

Daughter of Avery Stanton and half-sister to Dominique Stanton and Katherine Bell. Danielle came to Port Charles looking for work as an actress. She met and fell in love with Jake Marshak and stopped looking for acting jobs. She met her uncle, Rex Stanton, who used her in a scheme to try to get control of her niece Serena Baldwin's trust fund. Rex told Lucy Coe that Danielle was Dominique's half-sister, fabricated evidence to frame Scott Baldwin for Serena's kidnapping, and drugged Scott to make him look like an unfit father. Danielle felt guilty and wanted to confess. She feared what Rex would do to her and Jake. She confessed everything to Scott and he went to go tell the authorities. Danielle was in a car accident and died in surgery from her injuries.

== B ==
=== Dominique Baldwin (Deceased) ===
(Shell Danielson, 1997)

Married and divorced Leopold Taub. Had an affair with Mac Scorpio. Married Scott Baldwin. Mother of Serena Baldwin. Died of an inoperable brain tumor.

=== Gail Adamson Baldwin ===
(Susan Brown, 1997–2003)

Married Greg Adamson. Foster mother of Monica Quartermaine. Married Lee Baldwin. She is a former psychiatrist. Step-mother of Scott Baldwin.

=== Scott Baldwin ===
(Kin Shriner, 1997–2002, 2003)

Biological mother Meg Bently died. Married Laura Spencer. Married Dominique Baldwin. Father of Serena Baldwin, Karen Wexler, Logan Hayes, and Christina Baldwin (adopted with Lucy Coe). Lawyer.

=== Serena Baldwin ===
(Carly Schroeder, 1997–2003) Biological daughter of Scott Baldwin and Dominique Stanton. Adoptive daughter of Lucy Coe.

=== Alison Barrington (Deceased) ===
(Erin Hershey Presley, 2000–03) Biological daughter of Elizabeth and Malcolm Barrington. Mother of Rafe Kovich, Jr.

=== Amanda Barrington (Deceased) ===
(Anne Jeffreys, 1999–2003)

Wealthy Port Charles socialite and close friend of Lila Quartermaine and her husband Edward Quartermaine.

=== Elizabeth Barrington ===
(Rebecca Staab, 2002–03)

Married Derek Barrington. Mother of Alison Barrington.

=== Reese Black ===
(Mariam Parris, 2002–03)

=== David Bordisso ===
(Granville Van Husen, 1999)

Biological father of Scott Baldwin. Underground fashion designer.

=== Ellen Morgan Burgess ===
(Debbi Morgan, 1997–98; Marie-Alise Recasner, 1998–99)

Former doctor at General Hospital.

== C ==
=== Lucy Coe ===
(Lynn Herring, 1997–2003) Former social climber who moved to Port Charles from Laurelton after her affair with Kevin O'Connor. Raised by her aunt Charlene Simpson with her cousins Colton Shore and Decker Moss. Former wife of Tony Jones, Alan Quartermaine, Rex Stanton, Scott Baldwin, and Kevin Collins. Former administrator at General Hospital, and former CEO of Deception Cosmetics, Jax Cosmetics, and CoeCoe Cosmetics. After going to Transylvania to look up on her family history, Lucy met Rafe Kovich who turned out being her long lost cousin. Rafe told Lucy about their family history and that she is a vampire slayer, as is he.

=== Kevin Collins ===
(Jon Lindstrom, 1997–2003)

Son of Victor Collins. Twin brother of Ryan Chamberlain. Married Lucy Coe. Married Eve Lambert. Father of Livvie Locke. Psychiatrist at General Hospital. Wrote a bestselling murder mystery General Homicide.

=== Victor Collins ===
(Nicholas Pryor, 1997–2003)

Former spy and Math professor. Father of Kevin Collins and Ryan Chamberlain. Married Mary Scanlon.

=== Greg Cooper ===
(David Holcomb 1997–2000) Intern at General Hospital. Son of Marsha Cooper. Assaulted Audry Hardy. Revealed as the General Homicide killer.

=== Marsha Cooper ===
Mother of Greg Cooper.

=== Rae Cummings ===
(Linda Dano, 2000)

Rae comes to Port Charles looking for her long lost daughter.

== D ==
=== Bennett Devlin ===
(Edward Albert, 1997–98)

=== Julie Morris–Devlin ===
(Lisa Ann Hadley, 1997–2001) One of the original seven interns at the start of the series. Originally went by the last name "Morris" to hide her relationship to her father, a celebrated doctor. Eventually brainwashed by Greg Cooper into believing she was the General Homicide killer. Dated Frank Scanlon and secretly had his child, Christina (named after Chris Ramsey). Disappeared with the baby and resurfaced a year and a half later, revealing that she was dying and wanted to return Christina to Lucy.

=== Tim Dolan ===
(William deVry, 2002) Bartender; friend and confidante of Ian Thornhart.

== G ==
=== Alex Garcia ===
(George Alvarez, 1997–99; Eddie Perez, 1999–2001)

=== Gabriela Garza ===
(Ion Overman, 2000–02) Shy first year nurse at GH, began dating Joe Scanlon and stuck by him when he thought he might be HIV positive. Fell under Caleb Morley's spell and became a vampire, breaking free when Caleb died. Eventually found out she was adopted and Jamal Woods was her brother. Reunited with Joe and moved to Appalachia.

=== Ricky Garza ===
Eddie Matos, 2001–03) Brother to Emilio, adopted brother to Gabriela. Troublemaker who had a brief fling with Karen Wexler but found love with Casey Leong and, after her return to Heaven, her sister Marissa Leong.

=== Ed Grant ===
(Jed Allan, 2001–03) "Head angel" who helps Rafe navigate his life on earth. Eventually revealed to be Rafe's biological father.

== H ==
=== Audrey March Hardy ===
(Rachel Ames, 1997–99)

=== Matt Harmon ===
(Mitch Longley, 1997–2000)

=== Alison Hebrart ===
Tori Falcon, 2003)

== I ==
=== Imani ===
(Kent Masters King, 2003)

== K ==
=== Courtney Kanelos ===
(Sarah Aldrich, 1998–2000)

=== Neil Kanelos ===
(Colton James, 1998–2000)

=== Rafe Kovich (Deceased) ===
(Brian Gaskill, 2001–03)

Rafe's first claims to be a vampire slayer, and later reveals he is a distant cousin to Lucy Coe. Rafe helped Lucy and Kevin Collins learn Michael and Caleb Morley were the same person and a vampire as well. Rafe was able to help in Caleb's eventual downfall. While working behind the scenes, Rafe's true identity as an angel was learned by Alison Barrington. Alison became intrigued and enchanted by Rafe, but her attraction to him caused a rift in her relationship with Jamal Woods.

During the course of Caleb's reign of terror, Rafe revealed Caleb had been responsible for his death. Rafe had tried to prevent Caleb from killing a young woman and when his back was turned, Caleb took his life.

As the holidays neared, Rafe's heavenly boss Ed gave him until Christmas to undo the harm done by Caleb. That meant Rafe had only a few weeks to reunite all of the couples who had experienced relationship trouble. Rafe succeeded on every level except for one. His relationship with Alison had caused more trouble between Alison and Jamal. Rafe pleaded with Ed to allow him to return to Earth and undo the damage he'd caused. Ed agreed, but it meant Rafe would be returning without his special powers. He agreed and returned to Earth having to come to terms with his humanity - something he hadn't experienced in quite some time.

Rafe's goal was to reunite Jamal and Alison, but his mission took an abrupt turn when he realized he had fallen in love with Alison and she felt the same. Alison and Jamal suffered a falling out after Jamal's ex, Valerie was accidentally shot and killed. Rafe was there to help Alison pick up the pieces. Soon after, Rafe returned to heaven, having to leave his true love Alison behind.

== L ==
=== Eve Lambert ===
(Julie Pinson, 1997–2002)

=== Casey Leong ===
(Joy Bisco, 2002; 2003) Twin sister of Marissa Leong. Casey became a guardian angel who was sent back to earth with Rafe Kovich to watch over the people of Port Charles.

=== Marissa Leong ===
(Joy Bisco, 2002–03) Twin sister of Casey Leong.

=== Livvie Locke ===
(Kelly Monaco, 2000–03)

Livvie is the biological daughter of Kevin Collins and Grace Reese, but was raised to believe her aunt Rachel Locke was her mother. She is the sister/magical twin of Tess Ramsey, who was created from the good side of her personality, causing Livvie to become more ruthless. She was married to Rafe Kovich in 2002, and married vampire king Caleb Morley in 2003. She dated Jack and Chris Ramsey, and had a one-night stand with Frank Scanlon that resulted in an unborn child who was later miscarried. In 2003, Monaco was nominated for a Daytime Emmy Award for Outstanding Supporting Actress in a Drama Series for her role on Port Charles.

=== Rachel Locke ===
(Kimberlin Brown, 1999–2000, 2001, 2002)

Daughter of Estelle Reese and sister of Grace Reese. Aunt and adoptive mother of Livvie Locke. Former psychiatrist at General Hospital.

== M ==
=== Brenda Madison ===
(Laura Nevell, 2002–03)

=== Jake Marshak ===
(Rib Hillis, 1997–98) One of the original seven interns at the start of the series. Dated Danielle Ashley, who was lying about her real name and her purpose in Port Charles. Had a specialty in medical research, and was the third victim of the General Homicide killer when he was hanged at the Nurses Ball.

=== Caleb Morley ===
(Michael Easton; 2001–03)

Although Michael Easton first made his appearance on Port Charles from May 11, 2001, to August 29, 2001 as the character Father Michael Morley, a priest, in the story arc entitled "Time in a Bottle," Easton shortly afterwards also began assuming the role of Father Michael Morley's sinister alter-ego, Caleb, from June 4, 2001, to December 1, 2001, then again from October 25, 2002, to October 3, 2003. Caleb Morley was a fictional vampire, however in contrast to more traditional vampire depictions, the character Caleb Morley was presented as a passionate, deeply conflicted man obsessed with a woman, Livvie ("Olivia") Locke, who resembled his murdered fiancée Olivia. Though malevolent and seductive, Caleb was also shown to be loving and vulnerable. He had a previous relationship with Elizabeth Barrington, and married Livvie in 2003. In 2013, Easton reprised the role of Caleb on General Hospital, where he goes on a murder spree, killing Alison Barrington, Officer Bud Carlson, Dr. Jay Mosser, while trying to kidnap his son Rafe.

== P ==
=== Michael Pomerantz ===
(Matt Amshey, 1999–2000)

== R ==
=== Chris Ramsey ===
(Nolan North, 1997–2003) One of the original seven interns at the start of the show, and the only one to be on the show for its entire run. A mix of self-serving and dedicated, Chris drew the ire of most people he encountered. Brother of Jack Ramsey and best friends with Eve Lambert, he eventually found love with Julie Devlin, who named her daughter after him before leaving town. When she returned, dying, she told him that she wanted to spare him from her illness. He tried and failed to turn himself into a vampire, and spent most of the last year of the series as a researcher.

=== Jack Ramsey ===
(Brian Presley, 2000–03) Brother of Chris Ramsey, who tried to protect him from their alcoholic father growing up. Fell in love with Livvie Locke, and died in a motocross accident until Caleb Morley turned him into a vampire. Livvie later fell under Caleb's spell, and Jack fell for Livvie's "twin" Tess.

=== Tess Ramsey ===
(Kelly Monaco, 2002–03) Magical sister/twin of Livvie Locke, embodying the good personality traits that Caleb the vampire king thought would keep Livvie from accepting him. Married Livvie's ex Jack Ramsey.

=== Estelle Reese ===
(Beverly Garland), 2000-2001

Estelle is the mother of Rachel Locke.

=== Kate Reynolds ===
(Shannon Sturges, 2002)

Kate is an NYC attorney who came to Port Charles to represent Alison Barrington in her murder trial of Dr. Kevin Collins. Had a brief affair with Ian Thornhart.

== S ==
=== Frank Scanlon Jr. ===
(Jay Pickett) 1997–2003

=== Joe Scanlon ===
(Michael Dietz, 1997–99; David Gail, 1999–2000; Alex Mendoza, 2000–02)

=== Mary Scanlon ===
(Patricia Crowley, 1997-2003)

Mother of Frank and Joe Scanlon. Widow of Francis Xavier Scanlon. Married Victor Collins. owned and ran the Recovery Room.

=== Ben Shapour ===
(Christopher Maleki, 2001)

=== Rex Stanton ===
(Wayne Northrop, 1997–98)

== T ==
=== Joshua Temple ===
(Ian Buchanan, 2002–03)

=== Arianna Shapour Thornhart ===
(Opal Anchel, 2001)

=== Ian Thornhart ===
(Thorsten Kaye, 2000–03)

== W ==
=== Caroline Wexler ===
(Marie Wilson, 2001)

=== Karen Wexler (Deceased) ===
(Jennifer Hammon, 1997–99; Marie Wilson, 1999–2003)

=== Jamal Woods ===
(Kiko Ellsworth, 2000–03)
