= Justus Ward =

Fictional character from General Hospital

- General Hospital character
- M'fundo Morrison as Justus Ward
- Portrayed by: Joseph C. Phillips (1994–1998); Monti Sharp (1998–1999); M'fundo Morrison (2003–2006)
- Duration: 1994–1999; 2003–2006
- First appearance: June 2, 1994
- Last appearance: June 20, 2006
- Created by: Claire Labine
- Introduced by: Wendy Riche (1994); Jill Farren Phelps (2003)
- Book appearances: Robin's Diary
- Joseph C. Phillips as Justus Ward

- Monti Sharp as Justus Ward
In-universe information
- Occupation: Attorney; E.L.Q. board member City councilman
- Family: Quartermaine
- Parents: Bradley Ward; Isobel Ward
- Sisters: Faith Ward
- Grandparents: Edward Quartermaine; Mary Mae Ward
- Aunts and uncles: Alan Quartermaine; Tracy Quartermaine; Jimmy Lee Holt; David Ward; Idios Ward
- Nieces: Maya Ward
- First cousins: Keesha Ward; Roy Ward; Austin Gatlin-Holt; Skye Quartermaine (adoptive); A. J. Quartermaine; Jason Morgan; Andrew Cain; Emily Quartermaine (adoptive); Ned Ashton; Dillon Quartermaine
- Other relatives: Lila Rae Alcazar (adoptive); Michael Corinthos; Jake Webber; Daniel Morgan; Brook Lynn Ashton

Justus Ward is a fictional character on the ABC soap opera General Hospital. He is the son of Bradley and Isobel Ward, and the grandson of Edward Quartermaine. The role was originated by former Cosby Show actor Joseph C. Phillips, who appeared as Justus from June 2, 1994, to July 1, 1998. Justus was subsequently de-aged on two occasions, as evidenced by later portrayals of the character by Monti Sharp (1998–99) and M'fundo Morrison (2003–06).

== Storylines ==
Justus comes to Port Charles from Philadelphia for his late father Bradley Ward's memorial service. His cousin Keesha comes as well. Justus falls in love with Simone Ravelle who had just divorced Tom Hardy. Tom's mother Audrey Hardy, doesn't approve of Justus and Simone's relationship, but it is Tom who finally breaks them up. Edward Quartermaine offers Justus the position as Council for ELQ and gives him shares of the company, which enrages his cousins A.J. and Ned. Ned and Justus seem to get along, but Ned later blackmails Justus to get the shares of ELQ back.

Laura Spencer becomes the owner and administrator of the Ward House when Mary Mae Ward dies. Damian Smith wants to buy the Ward House to build a shopping mall. Laura refuses to sell to him because she loved Mary Mae and wants to honor her by continuing her work. Damian breaks into the house and douses gasoline on everything. Justus catches him just as he tries to set the house on fire. Justus knocks Damian unconscious with a baseball bat. He tries to get Damian out but the fire spreads quickly, so he leaves to call the fire department. The Ward House is destroyed. Damian Smith is presumed dead. Laura is arrested and charged with Damian's murder. Edward Quartermaine figures out Justus had killed Damian and convinces him not to turn himself in. Justus agrees to keep quiet. Even though Edward hires a lawyer to defend Laura, Justus is riddled with guilt and becomes her lawyer instead. He is successful in getting Laura acquitted but her husband Luke finds out Justus killed Damian and let Laura go through the entire ordeal. Justus confesses his guilt to Laura, who forgives him, but the friendships are never the same.

Justus resigns from ELQ, and eventually goes to work for his cousin Jason Morgan who is running Sonny Corinthos' territory in Sonny's absence. Justus gets Jason acquitted for assaulting Tony Jones after Tony had kidnapped Michael Corinthos and harmed Robin Scorpio. Justus also gets Carly Roberts acquitted for shooting Tony in a courtroom. When Sonny returns, Justus decides to work for Sonny and is persuaded to move into the empty penthouse across from Sonny's. As the Assistant District Attorney, Dara Jensen is very uncomfortable with this turn of events.

Detective Taggert dislikes Justus due to his connection for mobster Sonny Corinthos, as well as his involvement with Dara Jensen. Taggert figures out Alan Quartermaine has a drug addiction and sets him up to be busted for drug possession. Taggert then confronts Monica Quartermaine and blackmails her into getting information on Justus and Jason in exchange for saving Alan. Monica refuses to turn on Jason, but gives Taggert damaging information connecting Justus to the death of Damian Smith. Taggert arrests Justus, but Alexis Davis is able to get him out of jail since the evidence was obtained illegally. Edward Quartermaine uses his power and money to cover up the entire affair for his grandson.

Justus decides to get out of organized crime and runs for District Attorney. He wins with the help of Edward Quartermaine and Sonny Corinthos. Justus tells Sonny he killed Damian Smith. They made a deal. Sonny will leave him alone if Justus does not use anything he knows about Sonny's business to prosecute him. When Justus assumes the District Attorney position and becomes Dara's boss, What was left of their relationship fizzles. He later holds a press conference and resigns as District Attorney.

Justus is seen again in late 2003. He had just taken a vow of silence at a monastery when Jason arrives and asks Justus to return to Port Charles to defend Sonny Corinthos, who had just tried to kill Lorenzo Alcazar. Justus breaks his vows of silence, and at first tells Jason he refuses to return to Port Charles, but eventually agrees and takes on Sonny's case. During the trial, Justus argues Sonny was trying to protect his family from Alcazar. Due to jury tampering, Sonny is found not guilty.

In 2006, Justus goes to a meeting as a last minute replacement for Jason. The meeting was an ambush and Justus is murdered by Manny Ruiz.

== Reception ==
In 2020, Candace Young and Charlie Mason from Soaps She Knows put Justus on their list of Daytime's Most Important African-American Characters, commenting that "The oft-recast grandson of Edward Quartermaine — first played by Joseph C. Phillips in 1994 — was just never going to fit in with the relatives that he discovered late in life. Not because he was Black, mind you, because he had scruples. And the Q crew? Not so much." In 2024, Stephanie Holland from The Root placed Justus on her list of the most memorable black characters from American soap operas, writing, "We weren't surprised to discover that Edward Quartermaine had a secret grandson no one knew about. It was a surprise to find out he was Black. His ethics and instinct to do the right thing meant Justus would never truly fit in with the backstabbing Quartermaines. The fact that he was recast so often and given no substantive storylines also didn't help."
