= Jennifer Hammon =

American-born actress (born 1976)

- Born: Jennifer Leigh Hammon; March 7, 1976 (age 50); Winter Park, Florida, U.S.
- Occupation: Actress
- Years active: 1991–2001

Jennifer Leigh Hammon (born March 7, 1976) is an American-born actress known for her work on the daytime soap opera Port Charles (1997–1999) and as the lead in the 1997 film Allyson Is Watching.

== Biography ==
Jennifer Hammon was born in Orlando, Florida and attended Winter Park High School in the early 1990s and was a member of International Thespian Society Troupe 850 (other notable alums include Amanda Bearse, Billy Gardell, and Ben Rock from The Blair Witch Project). She graduated from Florida State University with a degree in Fine Art, and while a student acted in many theatrical productions.

At the age of 15, she was cast as a cheerleader in cable's Super Force. Other television credits include the CBS daytime soap opera The Young and the Restless, and in the television movie, Killing Mr. Griffin.

Hammon studied acting at the Beverly Hills Playhouse. She was first noticed when she accepted the role of Dr. Karen Wexler Cates on the daytime soap opera Port Charles from June 1997 to 1999. When Hammon declined a contract in 1999, the role was recast, with Marie Wilson assuming the role.

Hammon's theatrical credits include Parenthood, The Bodyguard and Wilder Napalm.

== Filmography ==
=== Films ===
- 1997 Allyson Is Watching (credited as Jennifer Leigh Hammon) as Allyson Roper
- 2000 Artie as Kristen
- 2001 Mach 2 as Gina Kendall

=== Television ===
- 1997 Killing Mr. Griffin (TV movie) as Bree Gunderson
- 1997, 1999 General Hospital as Karen Wexler Cates
- 1997-1999 Port Charles as Karen Wexler Cates
- 2000 JAG ("Drop Zone") as Krista Barron
- 2001 Star Trek: Voyager ("Author, Author") as Female N.D.
