= List of General Hospital characters introduced in the 1990s =

General Hospital is the longest-running American television serial drama, airing on ABC. Created by Frank and Doris Hursley, it originally was set it in a general hospital (hence the title), in an unnamed fictional city. In the 1970s, the city was named Port Charles, New York. The series premiered on April 1, 1963. This is a list of notable characters who significantly impacted storylines and began their run from 1990 to 1999.

== Brook Lynn Ashton ==
Brook Lynn Ashton
- General Hospital character
- Portrayed by: Katlyn and Sarah Avery (1997); Brooke Radding (1999–2001); Adrianne León (2004–2011); Amanda Setton (2019–present); Briana Lane (2020, 2022)
- Duration: 1997; 1999–2001; 2004–2006; 2010–2011; 2019–present
- First appearance: February 7, 1997
- Created by: Richard Culliton and Karen Harris
- Introduced by: Wendy Riche (1997, 1999); Jill Farren Phelps (2004, 2010); Frank Valentini (2019)
In-universe information
- Other names: Brook Lynn Quartermaine; BLQ; Lynn; Brook Lynn Cerullo
- Occupation: Music manager; Social media manager; Singer; Songwriter; Executive assistant; ELQ Shareholder; Escort (2010)
- Family: Quartermaine
- Parents: Ned Quartermaine; Lois Cerullo
- Stepparents: Olivia Falconeri
- Half-brothers: Leo Falconeri (adoptive)
- Spouse: Harrison Chase (2024–2026)
- Children: Gio Palmieri
- Adoptive children: Phoebe Chase
- Grandfathers: Larry Ashton; Carmine Cerullo
- Grandmothers: Tracy Quartermaine; Gloria Cerullo
- Uncles: Mark Cerullo; Louie Cerullo; Chuck Cerullo; Dillon Quartermaine
- Aunts: Francine Cerullo
- First cousins: Vincent Cerullo; Patrick Cerullo; Angie Cerullo
- Other relatives: Edward Quartermaine; Lila Quartermaine; Alan Quartermaine; Jimmy Lee Holt; AJ Quartermaine; Jason Morgan; Drew Cain; Emily Quartermaine (adoptive); Skye Quartermaine (adoptive); Michael Corinthos; Camila Palmieri; Gio Palmieri (adoptive)

Brook Lynn Ashton (also Quartermaine) is a fictional character on the ABC soap opera General Hospital. On the series, she is the daughter of Ned Quartermaine and Lois Cerullo, and was named after her mother's hometown of Brooklyn.

=== Casting ===
The faces of Brook Lynn Ashton

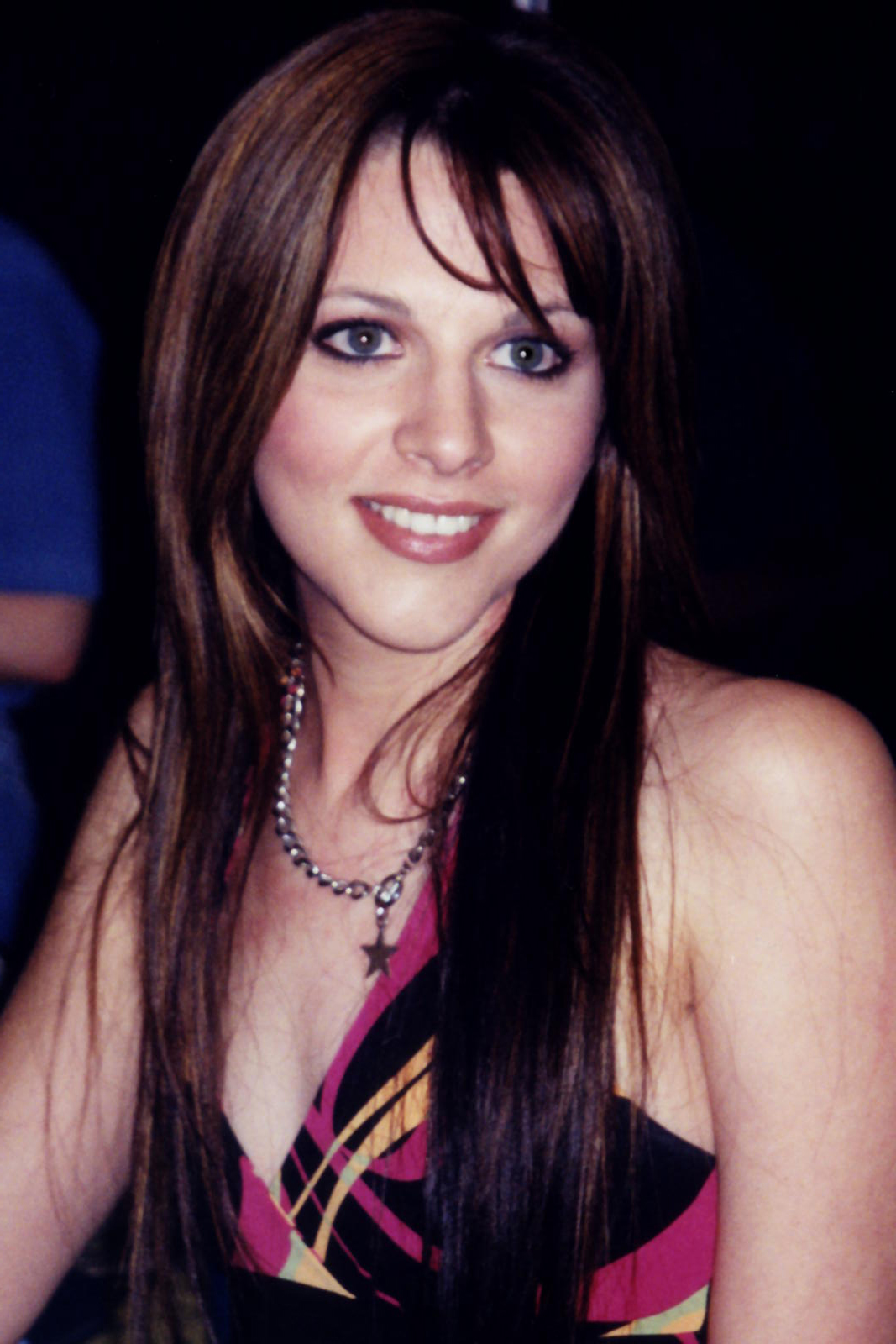
Adrianne León was cast in the role of Brook Lynn in 2004; she remained in the role intermittently until 2011.

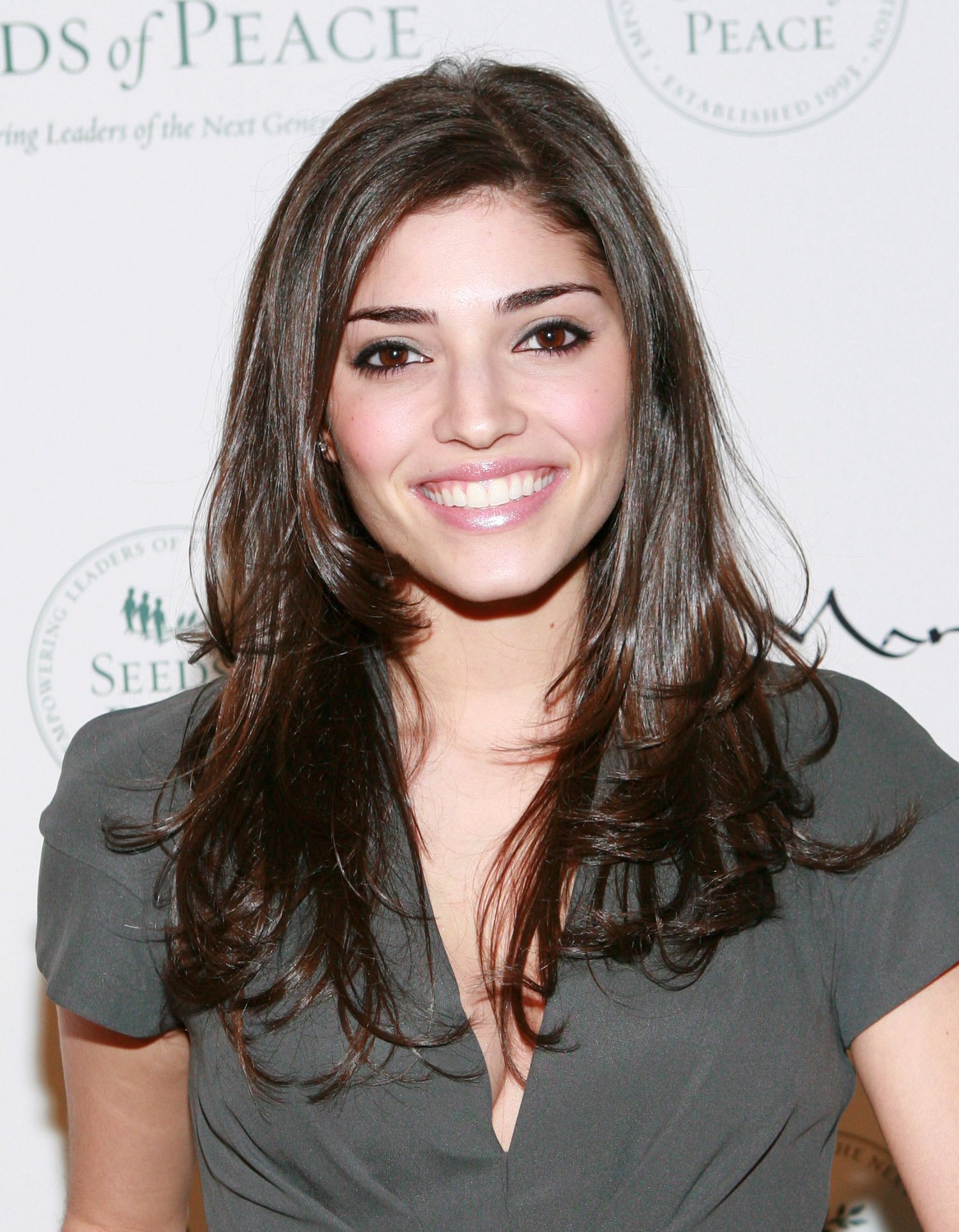
Amanda Setton joined the cast as Brook Lynn in 2019.

Originally played by actress child actors Katlyn & Sarah Avery in 1997, Brooke Radding from 1999 to 2001, the character was later recast with actress Adrianne León in 2004, who was nominated for two awards for the role in 2005: the Soap Opera Digest "Outstanding Female Newcomer Award", and "Outstanding Younger Actress" in the Daytime Emmy Awards. Leon continued to play the character until 2006. It was announced in 2010 that Leon would return to the show as Brook Lynn that May. She left the series again in 2011 after the character was written off.

In November 2019, TVLine announced Amanda Setton had been cast in the role; she made her first appearance on November 18. Jamey Giddens of Daytime Confidential had suggested that Setton be cast in the role in 2012, one year after Leon's exit. In August 2020, it was announced Setton would take temporary leave from the role to take a maternity leave; actress Briana Lane was cast in the role. Lane assumed the role from August 6 to November 16, 2020. Lane's performance in the role garnered her a Daytime Emmy Award nominations for Outstanding Guest Performer in a Drama Series in 2021. In February 2021, it was announced Setton would return to the role; she returned during the March 15 episode. Setton's performance has received critical acclaim, including a Daytime Emmy Award for Outstanding Supporting Actress in a Drama Series nomination in 2026.

=== Storylines ===
Brook Lynn is raised by her mother after her parents' divorce, but lives with her father as a teenager. She is a talented songwriter and singer, and her mother, a band manager and record-company executive, often pressures her to pursue a singing career. Brook dates Diego Alcazar for a time, but they later break up. She is also involved in adventures with Georgie Jones, her uncle Dillon Quartermaine, and Sage Alcazar, who competes with her for a recording contract. The obnoxious Sage is murdered by serial killer Mary Bishop after she is locked in the Quartermaine freezer by a fed-up Georgie. Sage is a sitting duck for the killer, who mistakes her for Brook's adopted cousin Emily Quartermaine. After her death, Brook puts a poignant song written by Sage to music and records it. Sage's uncle Lorenzo Alcazar blames Brook and the other teens for her death, but is brought to tears when he hears Brook perform the song. The following year, Brook is a victim of the Port Charles Stalker, who drugs girls and takes pictures of them. The stalker later turns out to be Sage's cousin Diego, who had read her journals and decided to get revenge on Brook and the others on Sage's behalf. Soon after, Brook decided to leave Port Charles and return to New York to pursue her music career.

Brook Lynn was convinced to return to town in 2010 by Carly Corinthos Jacks, who promised to pay Brook if she came between Dante Falconeri, with whom Brook grew up in Bensonhurst, and his girlfriend, Lulu Spencer. Carly hired Brook Lynn to sing at the Metro Court, and purchased her an apartment across from Dante's. Brook succeeds in drugging Dante at a bar, and attempts to have sex with him in his apartment, but Lulu arrives to stop this and blames Brook entirely. Feeling guilty, Brook later tells Lulu that she had been working for Carly, but Carly lies and claims she was only trying to test Dante to see if he was worthy of Lulu. Lulu believes Carly, and continues to blame Brook. Finding Brook in a state of devastation, wealthy Nikolas Cassadine invites her into his castle and hires her to be his escort for a formal dinner in France. While he teaches her etiquette, the two begin a flirtation, and then a romance. Brook eventually moves into the Cassadine castle and continues to work as Nikolas' escort at formal events. She is soon at odds with Elizabeth Webber, the mother of Nikolas' son Aiden. Elizabeth was interested in pursuing a relationship with Nikolas after previously turning him down, but Nikolas was now interested in Brook Lynn, and turned her down. Brook Lynn later got an offer to go on tour with a band. Nikolas got caught up in family issues, and encouraged Brook Lynn to take the offer because he could not put her first. The two parted ways, and Brook Lynn left town.

Brook Lynn returned to town in 2019 with Setton taking over the role. Brook Lynn legally changed her last name to Quartermaine in early 2020. Unlike León, Setton can't sing and is not a musician in real life, so in September 2020, Brook Lynn's singing career ended when her throat was slashed by Nelle Benson, nearly killing her.

== Tom Baker ==
Tom Baker
- General Hospital character
- Portrayed by: Jay Lacopo (1998); Don Harvey (2016–2017)
- Duration: 1998; 2016–2017
- First appearance: November 2, 1998
- Last appearance: January 11, 2017
- Created by: Robert Guza, Jr. and Karen Harris
- Introduced by: Wendy Riche (1998); Frank Valentini (2016)
In-universe information
- Occupation: Photographer
- Brothers: Seth Baker

Tom Baker, portrayed by Jay Lacopo, first appeared on November 2, 1998. On November 15, 2016, Don Harvey assumed the role.

=== Casting ===
The announcement of Harvey's casting was made on November 11, 2016. The character had previously been portrayed by Jay Lacopo on November 2, 1998.

=== Storylines ===
On Valentine's Day 1998, Elizabeth Webber (Rebecca Herbst) is raped, and Lucky Spencer (then Jonathan Jackson) helps her recover. Emily Quartermaine (then Amber Tamblyn) starts embarking on a new career in modeling, but soon finds herself the subject of a blackmail attempt when she receives a photograph of her head photoshopped onto the body of a nude model. She enlists the help of Lucky, his half brother Nikolas Cassadine (Tyler Christopher), and Elizabeth Webber. They discover the culprit is photographer Tom Baker, later revealed to also be responsible for raping Elizabeth. He is prosecuted for blackmailing Emily. Due to lack of evidence, he cannot be prosecuted for raping Elizabeth, but is sentenced to prison for 20 years. In late 2016, Tom was up for parole, and Elizabeth had to write a note to convince the board not to release him. Tom, though, was released, because the board thought he had reformed. However, Franco Baldwin (Roger Howarth), Elizabeth's boyfriend, was suspicious and attacks Tom in his brother's house on Oak Street. Franco attacks Tom again when he shows up at Elizabeth's work place, and says he also works there. Desperate to get Tom away from Elizabeth, Franco lures him to his art studio and locks him in a cage so Tom will miss his parole hearing and be sent back to prison. He lets him out, though, and Tom locks Franco in the same cage. Franco and Elizabeth later find out that Tom was found dead after being brutally stabbed, and Franco is suspected of killing Tom. Further flashbacks revealed that Tom preyed on Alexis Davis (Nancy Lee Grahn) while she was drunk, and held her at knife point. Alexis fought him off, and grabbed the knife from him; however, she didn't kill Tom, dropping the knife and walking away. The culprit was revealed to be Seth Baker (Michael Rodrick), Tom's brother who saw Tom attack Alexis and realized his brother was still a predator and would never change.

== Dominique Baldwin ==
Dominique Baldwin
- General Hospital character
- Portrayed by: Tawny Fere Ellis (1991); Shell Danielson (1991–1998)
- Duration: 1991–1993; 1997–1998
- First appearance: June 4, 1991
- Last appearance: January 2, 1998
- Created by: Gene Palumbo; Norma Monty; John Whelpley
- Introduced by: Gloria Monty
- Spin-off appearances: Port Charles
In-universe information
- Occupation: Partner in deception
- Parents: Avery Stanton; Margaret Stanton
- Half-sisters: Katherine Bell; Danielle Ashley
- Spouse: Leopold Taub; Scott Baldwin (1992–1993)
- Children: Cody Bell; Serena Baldwin
- Uncles: Rex Stanton
- Aunts: Irene Stanton

Dominique Baldwin (maiden name Stanton; formerly Taub) is a fictional character on the ABC soap opera General Hospital. She was portrayed by Tawny Fere Ellis from June 4 to November 14, 1991, and Shell Danielson from December 3, 1991, to May 5, 1993. Danielson reprised the role on Port Charles, GH's spin-off, from December 9, 1997, to January 2, 1998.

=== Storylines ===
Dominique arrived on the show, deaf and unhappily married to Leopold Taub. Her husband and she lived in a loveless marriage on the Stanton estate named Serenity. Her misfortunes changed when she fell in love with Mac Scorpio, who had accidentally wandered onto the grounds of her family's estate. After falling in love with Mac, Dominique divorced her husband and went to Port Charles to find Mac. When she found him, she convinced him that she needed protection and asked for his help in keeping Leopold away. Leopold came to town after Dominique, Mac, and he fought over her. During a gunfight caused by Sonny Corthinthos, the loud shots restored Dominique's hearing, but Leopold had her committed to Shadybrook Sanitarium after becoming her guardian. He was later killed by Sonny when he became involved in Sonny's

cartel to take over global business, and in his will, he left Dominique a large sum of money. After his death, Dominique was able to leave Shadybrook and resumed her relationship with Mac. She later broke up with Mac after she became jealous of his relationship with his ex-sister-in-law Holly Sutton. Dominique then moved on with her life and became partners with Julia Barrett and Scott Baldwin in Deception perfume. Connor Olivera, the son of Sean Donely, pursued Dominique, and the two had a brief relationship. Dominique later joined Scott for a weekend in Vegas, and when she woke up from a hangover a few days later, she was shocked to learn that Scott and she were married. After getting the news, Connor ended his relationship with Dominique and left town. After returning to Port Charles, Scott and Dominique filed divorce papers and decided that they would call off the divorce if they enjoyed being married to each other. The two ended up falling in love and decided to stay married.

In 1993, Dominique began to suffer from severe headaches and dizzy spells, and she was diagnosed with an inoperable brain tumor and only months to live. Scott was devastated by the news, but Dominique and he decided to have a second lavish wedding where all their friends and family could attend. Dominique wanted to give Scotty a child before she died, and that became possible when Lucy Coe agreed to become a surrogate for them. Lucy successfully carried Dominique's fertilized egg, and Dominique lived to hear the heartbeat of her child, but sadly did not live long enough to see the baby born. After hearing the baby's heartbeat, Dominique died in Scott's arms on a beautiful spring day overlooking the trees. In her will, Dominique left Scott a large amount of money for their child and him. Months later, Lucy gave birth to Dominique and Scott's daughter, and Lucy and Scott decided to name the baby Serena after Dominique's family's estate Serenity.

Dominique's spirit returned in 1997 on the soap opera Port Charles, to comfort her daughter Serena, who was in the middle of an ugly custody battle started by Dominique's uncle Rex Stanton, who only wanted all of Dominique's money. Dominique also appeared to Scott and took him on a Christmas Carol-type journey by showing him his past, present, and future. She showed him the consequences that he would face if he did not open up his heart to love again, and with Dominique's help, Scott was finally able to let her go and move on with his life.

In August 2022, it was revealed that Dominique has a son named Cody Bell, whom she gave up for adoption. When Mac first saw Cody, he immediately knew that there was a possibility that Cody could be his son. On November 9, a DNA test revealed that Mac is his biological father and that Sonny tampered with the test results all those years ago. Cody lies and states it's not a match, as he has a chance at inheriting a 35 million dollar necklace if he's the son of Leopold.

== Serena Baldwin ==
Serena Baldwin
- General Hospital character
- Portrayed by: Carly Schroeder (1997–2017); Kelly Kruger (since 2026)
- Duration: 1993; 1997–2003; 2017; 2026
- First appearance: December 7, 1993
- Created by: Claire Labine
- Introduced by: Wendy Riche (1993, 1997); Frank Valentini (2017)
- Crossover appearances: Port Charles
In-universe information
- Parents: Scott Baldwin; Dominique Stanton
- Adoptive parents: Lucy Coe
- Siblings: Karen Wexler (half); Franco Baldwin (half); Christina Baldwin (adoptive); Logan Hayes (half); Cody Bell (half)
- Grandparents: Meg Bentley; Lee Baldwin (adoptive); Gail Adamson Baldwin (adoptive)
- Aunts and uncles: Katherine Bell; Danielle Ashley

Serena Baldwin is a fictional character from the ABC soap opera General Hospital, and its now-defunct spin-off Port Charles. She was portrayed by Carly Schroeder. Serena's wealthy mother, Dominique Stanton Baldwin, was dying and wanted to leave a child for her husband Scott Baldwin. As a consequence, Serena was born via a surrogate mother, Lucy Coe. In June 2026, it was revealed that Kelly Kruger had been recast in the role. Previewing Kruger's debut as Serena, head writers Elizabeth Korte and Chris Van Etten revealed the character's return occurs at the hands of Lucy Coe, who requests her presence at Deception. She made her first appearance on July 30, 2026.

=== Storylines ===
Serena was born via surrogate mother Lucy Coe (Lynn Herring) when it was discovered that her mother Dominique was dying, but wanted to leave her husband Scott Baldwin (Kin Shriner) with a child. Lucy made Scott and Dominique's dream possible by carrying Serena until birth. Scott and Lucy named her Serena, after the Stanton family estate named Serenity. Soon after Serena's birth, Scott took her and fled to Canada to hide from the mob that was trying to steal the fortune that was left to Serena and him.

In 1997, Scott returned to Port Charles without Serena, and at first believed that Lucy had kidnapped her. He soon realized he was wrong, though, and not long after was hit by a car, but that did not deter his search for his missing daughter. Danielle Ashley, Dominique's half-sister, and Rex Stanton, their uncle, were later revealed to have taken Serena, and planned to use her to gain access to her trust fund. A worn-down Danielle ended up admitting the truth to Scott, and he was reunited with his daughter. Rex, however, pushed forward and made Scott look like an unfit father. His plan worked, and he gained custody of Serena, but Lucy married Rex to keep an eye on the little girl whom she had carried and loved. Rex was eventually forced to come clean with his deception, and he was arrested for his crimes.

Serena was again reunited with Scott, and this time for good. Serena and Scott began to spend time with Eve Lambert, which caused Lucy to become extremely jealous. Lucy came up with a plan to gain back their attention by looking like a hero and siphoned the gas out of Eve's car, so she could rescue them when their car ran out of gas. Her plan backfired, however, when they were in an accident and Serena lost her eyesight. After a successful surgery, she regained her sight, and Serena was ecstatic when her parents, Scott and Lucy, eventually got married and adopted a baby girl they named Christina Baldwin. Unfortunately, Christina was taken by her biological mother, and her loss caused the end of Scott and Lucy's marriage. The tide turned and Serena was thrilled when Christina's biological mother, Julie Devlin, returned her to Scott and Lucy after she (Julie) found out that she was dying and could no longer care for Christina. Later that year on Christmas Eve, Lucy married Kevin Collins and Serena was happy to gain an older sister named Olivia Locke. A few years later, Serena packed up her things and left with Lucy, Kevin, and Christina for Paris.

In July 2017, Serena returns to Port Charles with the news that Lee Baldwin has died. Along with her parents, she mourns his death.

== Harlan Barrett ==
Harlan Barrett
- General Hospital character
- Portrayed by: Michael Cole
- First appearance: March 7, 1991
- Last appearance: November 22, 1991
- Created by: Gene Palumbo
- Introduced by: Gloria Monty
In-universe information
- Occupation: Owner of barrett industries
- Parents: Oscar Barrett; Cora Peters
- Children: Julia Barrett; Brenda Barrett
- Grandchildren: Alec Barrett

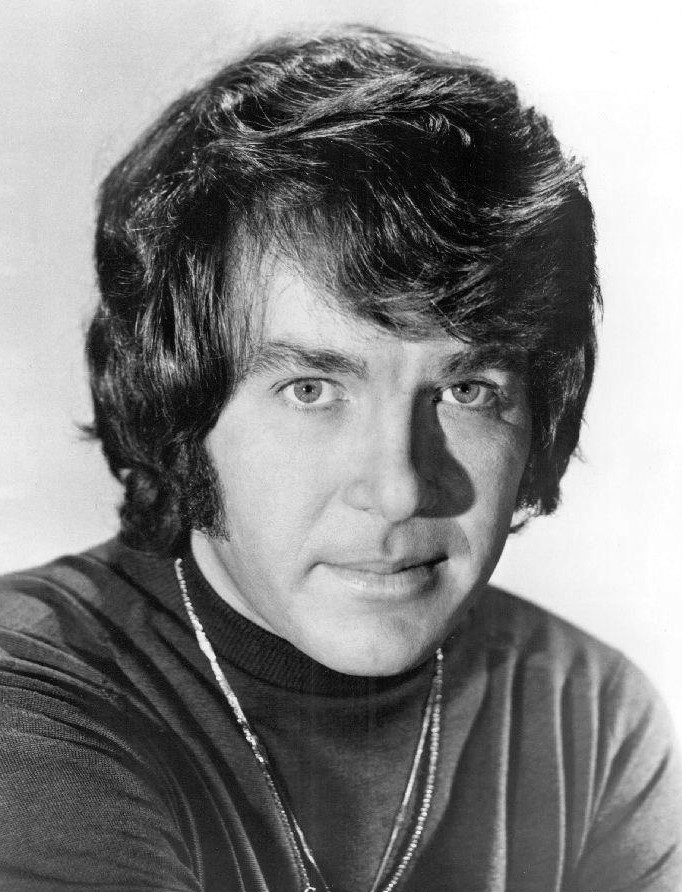
Cole appeared in the ABC series, The Mod Squad.

Harlan Barrett is a fictional character on the ABC soap opera General Hospital, played by Michael Cole in 1991.

=== Storylines ===
In 1991, Harlan Barrett arrives in Port Charles to save the sunken vessel, the SS Tracy. Harlan notices Bill Eckert has the initiative to raise the ship with a unique invention, and quickly hires Bill as the chief engineer for Barrett Industries.

Harlan finds himself quite the ladies man, bragging often that he could have any woman he wants. Currently, he sets his eyes on Tracy Quartermaine, who is very taken with the exuberant Harlan. Dating the wealthy socialite would prove very beneficial, as Harlan is after stocks in ELQ. He makes the mistake of angering Monica Quartermaine, Lucy Coe, and Tracy, who drug him and hold him captive overnight at the Quartermaine mansion.

Barrett, Leopold Taub are blackmailed by Sonny Corthinthos to be apart of his cartel corner the market on international trade with the use of a dangerous carcinogen, carbon disulfide. This toxin is manufactured at a canning operation, and they use as an elaborate ruse for their true purpose. Sonny strong-arms newcomer Paul Hornsby to marry his way into the Quartermaine family and snatch up their assets. Paul feeds Sonny information about Robert Scorpio's investigation. Bill is brought into Sonny's organization, but a deliriously wicked Sonny wants Bill to prove himself before he is completely accepted. Bill's assignment is to kill Faison's nemesis, Robert Scorpio. By this time, Bill and Robert are good friends, so a "faux death" is arranged. Bill shoots Robert on the waterfront, but Harlan working under Sonny's orders is not fooled, so he decides to shoot Robert again. Bill shoots and kills Harlan to protect Robert. Sonny's illicit activities come to an abrupt end. On Founder's Day, Leopauld Taub is killed by Sonny, and Cesar Faison escapes. A grief-stricken Julia promptly ends her relationship with Bill. Harlan's other daughter, Brenda, comes to town in 1992, after dropping out of boarding school, to claim her inheritance.

== Katherine Bell ==
Katherine Bell
- General Hospital character
- Portrayed by: Mary Beth Evans
- Duration: 1993–1999
- First appearance: June 20, 1993
- Last appearance: October 11, 1999
- Created by: Bill Levinson
- Introduced by: Wendy Riche
- Book appearances: Robin's Diary
- Spin-off appearances: General Hospital: Twist of Fate (1996); Port Charles
In-universe information
- Other names: Katherine Crawford
- Occupation: Businesswoman
- Parents: Avery Stanton; Kimberly Bell
- Siblings: Dominique Stanton; Danielle Ashley; Cody Bell (illegal adoptive)
- Spouse: Ned Ashton (1994)
- Aunts and uncles: Rex Stanton
- Nieces and nephews: Cody Bell; Serena Baldwin

Katherine Bell is a fictional character on the ABC soap opera General Hospital. Mary Beth Evans portrayed Katherine Bell from 1993 until the character's death in 1999. Katherine Bell came to Port Charles using the name Katherine Crawford, claiming to be a friend of Scott Baldwin's deceased wife, Dominique Stanton. In 1997, Stefan Cassadine accidentally shot Katherine and had her paralyzed. He never left her side afterward, leading to their engagement. However, their engagement was short as Katherine fell into a trap created for Helena, and fell from the parapet.

== Virginia Benson ==
Virginia Benson was introduced as the adoptive mother of Carly Benson.

== Stefan Cassadine ==
Stefan Cassadine
- General Hospital character
- Portrayed by: Stephen Nichols
- Duration: 1996–2003
- First appearance: June 28, 1996
- Last appearance: October 16, 2003
- Created by: Robert Guza, Jr. Karen Harris
- Introduced by: Wendy Riche
- Spin-off appearances: General Hospital: Twist of Fate (1996); Port Charles
In-universe information
- Occupation: Prince of Greek nobility Businessman
- Family: Cassadine
- Parents: Mikkos Cassadine; Helena Cassadine
- Brothers: Stavros Cassadine
- Half-brothers: Valentin Cassadine
- Half-sisters: Alexis Davis; Kristina Cassadine; Irina Cassadine
- Spouse: Bobbie Spencer (1996–1997)
- Grandparents: Ivan Cassadine; Basil Romanov; Agatha Romanov
- Aunts and uncles: Victor Cassadine; Tony Cassadine; Sophia Cassadine
- Nieces and nephews: Sam McCall; Nikolas Cassadine; Kristina Davis; Molly Lansing; Charlotte Cassadine
- Other relatives: Petros Cassadine; Dimitri Cassadine

Stefan Darius Mikkosovich Cassadine is a fictional character played by actor Stephen Nichols from June 28, 1996, to January 16, 2002, and June 2, 2003, to October 16, 2003, on General Hospital.

Stefan is the second son of villain Mikkos Cassadine, who once attempted to freeze the world with a weather machine in the famous 1980s Luke and Laura storyline, and his equally evil wife Helena. The complex and often dark character alternated between playing protective uncle to nephew Nikolas Cassadine and tender would-be lover of Laura Spencer, and his obsessive vendetta against Luke Spencer, whom he blamed for the death of his brother Stavros Cassadine and for his own loss of Laura.

=== Storylines ===
Stefan first came to Port Charles in 1996 with his teenaged nephew Nikolas Cassadine, the secret son of Laura Spencer and Stefan's older brother Stavros. The Cassadines are descended from a titled, aristocratic Russian family, who fled to Greece following the 1917 Russian Revolution. Stefan had raised Nikolas since infancy after Laura had escaped the captivity of Stavros and been forced to leave Nikolas behind, after Helena "murdered" Laura's mother, Lesley Webber, when she tried to contact him.

Stefan battled his mother Helena Cassadine for control of Nikolas and control of the family company, and was official head of the family by the time Nikolas was seven. His mother, emotionally abusive to him during his childhood, viewed him as weak and soft, which he was only in comparison to the more homicidal members of the Cassadine family. Helena strongly favored his older brother Stavros and alternately ignored and belittled the more sensitive Stefan. Stefan loved and protected Alexis Davis, who was raised as his first cousin but later turned out to be his half-sister, both children of Mikkos. He paid for her to attend boarding school in the United States as a teenager and encouraged her to go into the legal profession. However, he also dominated her and expected complete loyalty and obedience from her. Alexis was charged with doing much of the legwork for "Timoria", Stefan's planned vendetta against the Spencer family and General Hospital, both of which Stefan blamed for the presumed death of his brother Stavros. In their first years on the show, fans detected romantic chemistry in Stefan's scenes with Alexis. Stefan expressed disapproval of Alexis's relationship with Ned Ashton and she later went to great lengths to break up his engagement to Katherine Bell, whom she disapproved of. Fans of the romantic pairing called themselves the "Gutter Rats", though no actual romantic relationship was ever alluded to in their scenes together.

Laura Spencer contacted Stefan after her baby daughter Lulu Spencer was diagnosed with aplastic anemia and was in need of a bone marrow transplant from a matched donor. Nikolas turned out to be a match. True to the love-hate relationship Stefan always had with Laura, Stefan forced Laura to beg for her daughter's life. He then allowed Nikolas to donate the life-saving bone marrow to his sister. At the same time, Stefan launched his Timoria plot, to exact revenge on Luke and Laura for (presumably) killing his brother, Stavros, while he was attempted to rape Laura Spencer fifteen years prior. Stefan later married Luke's sister Bobbie Spencer as part of his revenge plot against the Spencers. The marriage ended in divorce after Stefan caught Bobbie investigating his actions against the Spencers.

In the intervening years, Stefan had an affair with and later became engaged to Katherine Bell. This relationship was derailed for a time after his "cousin" Alexis produced proof that Katherine was Stefan's half-sister Natasha. This was eventually exposed as a falsehood, when it turned out that Alexis was the real Natasha. This revelation rocked Stefan and he reacted as a true Cassadine. Stefan banished Alexis, but eventually forgave her. During the grand Bacchanalia on Spoon Island, a ball celebrating her engagement to Stefan, Katherine fell off a parapet at the mansion, the victim of a failed attempt to murder Helena by Luke and Alexis. Katherine was rescued by Helena Cassadine and restored to health, but died in a second fall from the parapet (this time assisted by Helena) soon after her return.

Meanwhile, Laura was harboring a secret about Nikolas, which strained her relationship with her husband and family. Eventually, Luke discovered that she had had sex with Stefan and believed that Stefan, not Stavros, was Nikolas' father, and had lied to him about it. Meanwhile, Stefan had to face Nikolas about the secret that Stefan, too, had kept. Nikolas lashed out at Stefan, moving out and depending heavily on his brother, Lucky Spencer, and his friend, Emily Quartermaine, for support. Stefan did not approve of Nikolas's choices for companions, feeling that they were below his stature as a Cassadine. In particular, Stefan felt that Nikolas should always be wary of Spencers, and not trust them as he had come to trust Lucky. Eventually the two reconciled. Nikolas had always loved Stefan like a father, after all.

DNA testing later proved that Stavros was actually Nikolas's father, much to Stefan's bitter disappointment. The damage was already done to Luke and Laura, however, and they divorced. Shortly before Luke and Laura divorced, Stefan and Laura began a relationship, and Stefan felt hopeful that he could regain his relationship with Laura, the woman he had so loved and hated over the years. Unfortunately, their relationship ended bitterly, after Stefan learned that Laura's presumed dead son, Lucky, was alive, and temporarily withheld the information from her. Laura eventually learned about this from Luke, and violently confronted Stefan. Laura could not forgive him for the lie, and Stefan finally accepted that he and Laura had no future.

Stefan later fell in love with Quartermaine cousin Chloe Morgan and was framed for her murder when his back-from-the-dead brother, Stavros, killed her. The plot was eventually revealed and Stefan was cleared.

He appeared more aggressive and continually more deranged and desperate in his final year on the show. Stefan returned to the show after an absence. He had plotted an arranged marriage for Nikolas with Lydia Karenin, a wealthy Russian heiress, to restore the Cassadine family's wealth. He ordered Nikolas to marry Lydia, but Nikolas was reluctant to follow through. Stefan attempted to kill Nikolas's real love, Emily Quartermaine, but pushed Lucky's girlfriend Summer (a Laura look-alike), off the cliff by mistake. His secret was well hidden, though, he thought. Stefan's loan from Lorenzo Alcazar was due (this loan transpired as Stefan re-entered the show); Stefan and Lorenzo's henchmen fought quite a bit with him in his final weeks. At this time as well, Luke Spencer kidnapped and put Stefan on "trial" in front of the entire Port Charles television audience, taped by Dillon Quartermaine. Luke intended for Stefan to admit to the attempted murder of Emily Bowen-Quartermaine and actual murder of Summer Holloway. Stefan apparently died after he was burned (and disfigured) and later stabbed in a knife fight with Luke Spencer.

Luke was arrested for Stefan's murder but was released when Stefan's suicide note was found, where Stefan admitted that he had set Luke up for his staged "murder".

== Jagger Cates ==
Jagger Cates
- General Hospital character
- Portrayed by: Antonio Sabàto, Jr. (1992–2008); Adam Harrington (2024)
- Duration: 1992–1995; 2008; 2024
- First appearance: April 8, 1992
- Last appearance: September 3, 2024
- Created by: Maralyn Thoma
- Introduced by: Wendy Riche (1992); Lisa de Cazotte (2008); Frank Valentini (2024)
- Book appearances: Robin's Diary
- Spin-off appearances: General Hospital: Night Shift
In-universe information
- Other names: John Cates
- Occupation: FBI agent
- Parents: Lewis Cates; Sophia Estelle Cates
- Siblings: Stone Cates; Gina Cates
- Spouse: Karen Wexler (1994–1997)
- Children: Stone Cates

Jagger Cates is a fictional character on General Hospital. The role was originated on April 8, 1992, by Antonio Sabàto, Jr., who portrayed him until March 30, 1994, and again briefly from September 29 to October 5, 1995. In 2008, Sabàto reprised the role during the second season of General Hospital: Night Shift. Adam Harrington assumed the role when Jagger returned to Port Charles in February 2024 as a series regular.

=== 1990s ===
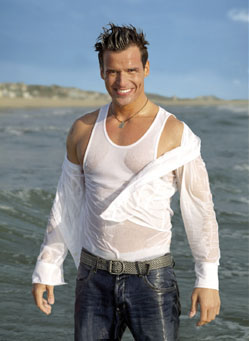
Sabàto starred alongside former 1990s co-stars in the summer of 2008 when he appeared on Night Shift.

John Cates was separated from his siblings Michael and Gina after they were orphaned as children. John assumed the edgier name of Jagger, and fell in with a rough crowd, but his heart was still good—all it took to bring that out of him was some tender, loving care from young Karen Wexler. In 1992, thugs broke into Kelly's Diner, roughed up owner Ruby Anderson, and attempted to rob the place. One of them, a homeless hooligan named Jagger Cates, was shot trying to protect Ruby. Ruby not only forgave him, but she also gave him a job and a place to live.

Wealthy teen Jason Quartermaine started working on Dr. Tom Hardy's new volunteer "Teen Hot Line". Along with freshman Robin Scorpio and fellow junior Karen Wexler, Jason had a place on the crisis line to help teens in trouble. Karen and Jason grew close, but before long, Karen got involved with Jagger Cates, a drop-out with a sweet disposition.

After a storm, Jason, Jagger, and Karen were stranded on an island. On the island, they encountered Cal Atkins and his convict brother, Joseph Atkins, who had broken out of jail. Cal dragged Karen to the top of a cliff and tried to rape her. Jagger saved her. Jason got there in time to see Cal plummet to the shore below. Convinced that Cal was dead, the teens made a pact to keep what had happened a secret. Cal was actually alive and well with his brother. Back home, a shoot-out occurred. Jagger suffered a minor wound. Cal was arrested. Atkins escaped and sought out Bobbie, who had befriended him in letters to his jail cell. The escaped convict took her hostage and tried to rape her. Atkins was caught when he tried to escape in a police helicopter flown by Mac Scorpio.

Teenager Brenda Barrett turned up on her big sister Julia's doorstep. Julia persuaded Brenda to move in with her and enroll in Port Charles High School. Jagger Cates also enrolled at PCHS. Brenda was instantly attracted to him. She could tell he liked Karen, whom Brenda instantly disliked. Neither Jagger nor Brenda liked school, but Jagger liked Brenda's style and they fell into each other's arms and had sex. For good reason, Brenda Barrett was insecure about her relationship with Jagger Cates. Jagger and Karen had fallen in love. Karen began having disturbing flashbacks. An old boyfriend of Karen's mother, Rhonda, came to stay with Karen and her. Soon after seeing her mother's old boyfriend Ray Conway, long repressed memories flooded back to Karen because he had abused her when she was a child.

Jagger located his sister, Gina, and hired Felicia Jones and Mac Scorpio to find his 16-year-old brother. At a wild party, someone slipped "ecstasy" into Karen's drink. A kid named Stone came to her aid. He turned out to be Jagger's brother, Mike. Karen felt unworthy of Jagger, who had started to box with Marco Dane as his manager. She broke up with Jagger, who was comforted by Brenda Barrett. A troubled Karen went to work as a stripper at the Paradise Lounge, run by Sonny Corinthos. Stone lived in Sonny's apartment above the club. Soon, Karen was addicted to stripping, Sonny, and pills. Karen kept her new life a secret while she worked at Kelly's and the hospital, and went to class at Port Charles University. Jagger and "Stone" were reunited.

After Jagger and Stone argued over Stone's going back to school, Jagger followed Stone to the Paradise Lounge. He saw Karen stripping. Later, a stunned Jagger found Karen in bed with Sonny and beat Sonny up. Sonny put a hit out on Jagger. Marco promised Sonny a piece of Jagger's boxing action in exchange for Jagger's life. Sonny liked the idea of "owning" Jagger and agreed. Slipping into the strip joint, Brenda's eyes popped when she saw a drugged-out Karen taking her clothes off. Brenda saw it all, and told everyone. Karen's friends and family rallied around her during her recovery. In his next fight, Jagger refused to follow Sonny's orders to take a dive. Jagger and Karen ran away and finally had sex.

By 1994, Stone and Jagger finally rekindled the warm relationship they had as kids. Jagger stopped boxing and decided to become a cop. Karen, who had received a scholarship to study medicine at Northwestern University, and he got engaged. Before Jagger and Karen's wedding day, a suicidal patient at the hospital almost plunged out a window with Karen. A new orderly, Miguel Morez, saved them both. Miguel saw how Jagger felt about Karen and had a pang. He had once been in love like that with a girl named Lily.

Jagger stopped his brother Stone from driving the getaway van that would carry Frank Smith out of jail. Tragedy struck when the bike Jagger was riding crashed and he was knocked out. Jagger recuperated from his motorcycle spill in time to marry Karen in a touching wedding ceremony. It was a day filled with love—and surprises. Karen's mother revealed to Karen that Scott Baldwin was her father. Karen, overjoyed by the news, happily hopped on the back of her new husband's motorcycle and sped off to a new life in San Francisco, where Karen would become a doctor and Jagger would become a police officer.

In 1995, Stone Cates had come down with the flu. As his girlfriend Robin Scorpio nursed him with chicken soup, he convinced her she should go to Yale. Stone assured Robin he had been tested and was HIV negative. They had sex for the first time. Mac was furious when he found out, but he came to realize he had to let Robin grow up. When Stone could not shake the flu, tests revealed the worst possible news. Stone was HIV positive. Stone could not bring himself to reveal the deeply tragic news to Robin.

Jagger returned to Port Charles to visit with Stone, luckily getting the chance to spend a little time with his brother before Stone died later that year.

Karen returned to Port Charles in 1997 as a young doctor in General Hospital's intern program, where she discovered she was going to be working closely with Dr. Joe Scanlon. Karen and Joe had been childhood friends in Port Charles. Although Karen was now married to Jagger Cates, a police officer stationed in San Francisco, she was still attracted to Joe, and Joe was attracted to Karen.

Karen's marriage to Jagger was on shaky ground, but she wanted to make it work. Although they constantly found themselves in close situations, Karen and Joe resisted their impulses, as Karen tried to stay faithful to her husband. Afraid of her feelings for Joe and needing to see Jagger, Karen went to San Francisco. While there, Karen learned that Jagger had been having an affair and that their marriage was truly over. Karen returned to Port Charles and her friendship with Joe grew deeper and the two began dating.

=== 2008: General Hospital: Night Shift ===
In 2008, Jagger returns to Port Charles with his five-year-old son Stone, named after his deceased brother. Stone's mother is suing for custody of their son. While in Port Charles, Stone is diagnosed with autism spectrum disorder; at first, Jagger is in denial about it. Writer Sri Rao explained the effect on Jagger he wanted to portray, stating "The focus of our story is mostly on how it affects Jagger as a parent. ... It's a very overwhelming and complicated emotional journey that a parent goes on when their child is diagnosed with autism. It starts with denial, embarrassment, confusion, sadness, and ultimately, acceptance. That's the arc we'll see Jagger go through over the course of this season." Rao reached out to Autism Speaks to make sure he told the story "authentically, responsibly and realistically". Throughout the show, the audience sees Jagger slowly come to terms with Stone's autism. At the end of season, Jagger and Stone return to San Francisco.

=== 2024 ===
In February 2024, Jagger (Adam J. Harrington) returns to Port Charles, now going by his given name, "John", as an FBI agent. He first meets Carly Spencer (Laura Wright) at Bobbie's (formerly known as Kelly's) before he meets Leo Falconeri (Easton Rocket Sweda) and keeps him company, recognizing that he's autistic like his own son, Stone. After getting a call, he and a few FBI agents shut down a sting operation ran by Anna Devane (Finola Hughes) and Jordan Ashford (Tanisha Harper). Anna recognizes the lead agent as Jagger, but John reveals that he's outgrown the nickname and reveals that they're interfering with a federal investigation, but gives them enough information to satisfy their curiosity before arresting them.

After Anna accepts the position of being the Commissioner of the PCPD, she and Jordan are released and work with John in his investigation into Curtis Ashford's (Donnell Turner) shooting. In March, following a failed assassination attempt on Sonny at a warehouse, it's discovered that Jason Morgan is alive and appearing to be working with another sniper. John, the FBI, Anna, and the PCPD pursue Jason since he was the prime suspect in the shooting of Sonny's son, Dante Falconeri (Dominic Zamprogna). However, after Jason turns himself in to clear his name, John privately confronts Jason on what he's doing and demands to know what happened, so Jason informs him of what really went down following the failed assassination attempt; Jason made sure the other sniper missed his shot and they were making their way to the extraction team on Pier 50, but Dante caught up with them, forcing Jason to reveal himself before the sniper shot Dante. John tells Jason that his cover is blown and he's looking at capital murder if Dante dies.

Jason reveals to Anna that he's been working for John as an informant since November 2021; the FBI has leverage over him about RICO Violations which carries a 20-year prison sentence so John has been forcing him to infiltrate an organization called "Pikeman", where he signed on as a private military contractor because the FBI could not send in an official agent due to Pikeman's deep ties to the WSB. After Jason is released on bail, Dante wakes up and clears Jason's name, so John orders Jason to stay in Port Charles and use himself as bait to lure Pikeman out of hiding. Jason initially refuses, so John threatens to use the FBI's leverage and send Carly to prison for RICO violations, forcing Jason to agree.

Drew eventually takes the fall for Carly which causes John to switch gears in his vendetta against Sonny and bring charges of murder against Sonny's daughter Kristina for her part in the accident that caused her to lose the baby she was carrying for her sister Molly. After realizing that the system would not stop John, in August 2024, Sonny lured John to the Quartermaine estate and shot him twice. After a few weeks, his murder investigation was dropped.

== Lois Cerullo ==
Lois Cerullo
- General Hospital character
- Portrayed by: Rena Sofer (1993–1997, 2023–2025); Lesli Kay (2004–2005)
- Duration: 1993–1997; 2004–2005; 2023–2025
- First appearance: December 15, 1993
- Last appearance: October 24, 2025
- Created by: Claire Labine
- Introduced by: Wendy Riche (1993); Jill Farren Phelps (2004); Frank Valentini (2023)
- Book appearances: Robin's Diary
In-universe information
- Occupation: Cosmetics Spokesperson; Talent agent
- Parents: Carmine Cerullo; Gloria Cerullo
- Siblings: Mark Cerullo; Louie Cerullo; Francine Cerullo; Chuck Cerullo
- Husband: Ned Ashton (1994–1997)
- Daughters: Brook Lynn Ashton
- Grandchildren: Gio Palmieri
- Aunts and uncles: Gerald Moore, Sr. Grace Moore
- Nieces and nephews: Vincent Cerullo; Patrick Cerullo; Angie Cerullo
- First cousins: Gerald Moore, Jr. Geraldine Moore
- Other relatives: Camila Palmieri

Lois Cerullo (formerly Ashton) is a fictional character on the ABC soap opera General Hospital. Rena Sofer originated the role from December 15, 1993 to September 24, 1996. Sofer briefly returned from February 7 to 17, 1997 and from September 30 to October 2, 1997. Sofer won the Daytime Emmy Award for Outstanding Supporting Actress in a Drama Series in 1995. Actress Lesli Kay stepped into the role from June 1, 2004, to March 14, 2005. Lisa LoCicero, who would later be cast as Olivia Falconeri in 2009, auditioned for the role in 2004. On September 14, 2023, it was announced Sofer would reprise the role. She exited the role on October 24, 2025, when Lois relocated to South Korea.

In 2023, Soaps.com contributor Charlie Mason placed Lois at number thirty-one on his ranked list of General Hospital's 40+ Greatest Characters of All Time, with his reasons being "The Brooklyn accent. The incredible nails. The yin/yang chemistry with "Eddie Maine". Ned Quartermaine's former wife would never have forgiven us if we'd left her off this list, and neither would we."

=== Storylines ===
Lois first appeared on General Hospital in 1993 when she saw Eddie Maine perform at a New York concert, Lois was a band manager and quickly hired "Eddie". Unbeknownst to her, Eddie Maine's real name was Ned Ashton. She believed that he was a singer by night and a traveling pharmaceutical salesman by day, and Ned let her. They soon fell in love and got married. After their wedding, Ned moved them to his hometown, Port Charles. There she was re-introduced to her old friend, Sonny Corinthos, whom she had known since their childhood in Bensonhurst. She also quickly became friends with Sonny's girlfriend, Brenda Barrett, and the two opened their own recording company, L&B Records.

Lois was still in the dark about Ned's true identity. Meanwhile, Ned was being forced to marry Katherine Bell, who was blackmailing his family, the Quartermaines. Ned refused to tell Lois the truth because he did not want to hurt her. She found out anyway, while watching TV, and saw that Eddie Maine was actually Ned Ashton, and that he was married to Katherine. During Katherine's birthday party, she popped out of cake, saying "Happy Birthday to Mrs. Ned Ashton, from the other Mrs. Ned Ashton!" Soon after, Lois left Ned.

Ned was not ready to give up on Lois, and persistently pursued her. Eventually, the two reconciled and Lois accepted his marriage proposal but under one condition - no more lies. He agreed and they married again. Their marriage went through tough times, starting with Ned telling Mac Scorpio that Sonny was a mobster, after Lois confided this to him. It was Ned's family, however that put real strain on their union. Lois wanted Ned to distance himself from the dysfunctional Quartermaines. His mother, Tracy Quartermaine, hated Lois from the first moment they met.

After Tracy put ELQ in financial jeopardy, she left town, leaving Ned to clean up the mess. Dismayed by this, Lois gave Ned an ultimatum: his job or her and their unborn daughter. Ned chose ELQ and vowed to take full custody of their daughter. Hurt, Lois left Ned and returned to Bensonhurst where she gave birth to a baby girl, who she named Brook Lynn after her favorite city.

Sometime later, Lois returned to Port Charles, feeling guilty for keeping Ned away from his daughter. During this time, it was revealed that Ned had had an affair with his uncle's wife, Monica Quartermaine. She then overheard him blackmailing his cousin, Justus Ward to him win full custody of Brooklyn and have Lois parental rights terminated indefinitely. Lois could not handle it, kidnapped baby Brooklyn and again left town. It was at this time that she also help comfort Brenda, after Sonny left her at the altar before skipping town hiding from Ned.

Years later, Lois returned to Port Charles to look for her and Ned's now teenage daughter, Brook Lynn, after she ran away. After Lois and Ned located Brook Lynn, Lois decided to return to Port Charles. Not long after her return, Lila Quartermaine died. Soon afterwards, Lois began dating Lorenzo Alcazar. Brook Lynn was very upset about this, and decided to start a girl band at Lois' request. Brook Lynn, Sage Alcazar, Georgie Jones, and Maxie Jones were going to fake the audition. But after Maxie was nowhere to be found, Dillon was forced to dress in drag and pose as a woman. Things got a bit out of control when Simon, the record producer, began hitting on Dillon at The Cellar. Those plans failed as the storyline ended, especially after Sage was murdered by Mary Bishop. Lois continued to date Alcazar. Alcazar's feelings for Carly Corinthos began to return, and Lois began to fade into the background. After Lesli Kay was placed from contract to recurring status in March 2005, Lois ceased to appear. Much later, it was explained that Ned, Lois and Brook Lynn had gone back to Manhattan to continue in the music industry.

They were mentioned by Sonny Corinthos who referred to her and her sister. On August 25, he called her mother Gloria, and asked her how to get a hold of Olivia Falconeri. Olivia later references the two as "tearing it up in L.A. and they always visit Gloria, that's Lois's mother, whenever they're in Bensonhurst."

On May 25, 2010, it was mentioned by Carly that Lois is managing several bands in Europe and currently lives in London.

== Ryan Chamberlain ==
Ryan Chamberlain
- General Hospital character
- Portrayed by: Jon Lindstrom
- Duration: 1992–1995; 1998; 2018–2023
- First appearance: June 20, 1992
- Last appearance: February 22, 2023
- Created by: Maralyn Thoma and Bill Levinson
- Introduced by: Wendy Riche (1992, 1998); Frank Valentini (2018)
- Book appearances: Robin's Diary
- Spin-off appearances: Port Charles
In-universe information
- Other names: Todd Wilson; Kevin Collins
- Occupation: Pediatrician; DVX agent
- Parents: Victor Collins; Melanie Chamberlain
- Stepmother: Mary Scanlon (1999–present)
- Brothers: Kevin Collins
- Wife: Gloria Wilson (until 1992)
- Daughters: Esme Prince
- Grandsons: Ace Prince-Cassadine

Ryan Chamberlain is a fictional character on General Hospital. He was portrayed by Jon Lindstrom from 1992 until 1995, who also played Chamberlain's identical twin brother, Kevin Collins. Lindstrom reprised his role as Ryan on April 3 and 21, June 16 and 19, 1998, July 8 to 9, 1998, September 4, 16, 18 and 23, 1998, on the spin-off Port Charles. Lindstrom reprised Chamberlain from August 10, 2018 until March 8, 2019 when the character was presumed dead. Ryan appeared in Ava's nightmare on April 4, 2019. Although Ryan was revealed to be alive on May 14, 2019, Lindstrom reprised the role again on May 22, 2019.

=== Storylines ===
Ryan Chamberlain was introduced as a pediatrician at General Hospital, but he is revealed to have been hiding his mentally unstable behavior for some time. Felicia Jones, while living in Texas, knew him as "Todd Wilson" and saw him murder his wife Gloria. She had amnesia when she got back to Port Charles, and did not remember knowing Ryan/Todd. He becomes obsessed with Felicia, who gets her memory back, and he is arrested for attempted murder after he traps her in a cabin and she attacks him in self defense. Ryan crashes Felicia and Mac Scorpio's wedding with a bomb, but is sent to an asylum. Kevin, a psychiatrist, came to town intent on rehabilitating his brother. Unfortunately, Ryan was faking his progress, and used his twin to escape the mental hospital and impersonate him. After escaping with the help of his counselor, Connie Cooper, he kills her and kidnaps Georgie Jones.

Kevin helped Mac and Felicia track his psychotic twin down at a fun-house and rescue Georgie, though the killer let himself die in the building's violent explosion rather than be locked away in the hospital again. Ryan continued to appear to Kevin and taunt him over the years. As children, Ryan was sexually abused by their mother. One night, she abuses Kevin, thinking he was Ryan. When Kevin tells their father, he takes Kevin and leaves Ryan behind. Ryan eventually killed his mother.

In 2018, Ryan was revealed to be alive and was being treated and hidden in Ferncliff by Kevin. One day, Ryan gets the upper hand, knocks Kevin out, and switches places with him. For over six months, Ryan impersonated Kevin and fell in love with Ava Jerome to the point of being obsessed with her, and he also racked up new victims as he went on a murder spree. In early 2019, Ryan framed Franco Baldwin for his crimes, and planned to run away with Ava to Niagara Falls, who also kidnapped Carly Corinthos. When Franco was finally proven to be innocent and exposed Ryan as the killer, Laura Webber and Jason Morgan followed Ryan and Ava to Niagara Falls, where Ryan threw himself off a bridge and was presumed dead.

Two months later, he was revealed to be alive and returned to Port Charles for Ava, who planned to kill him since he killed Kiki Jerome months prior.

In 2022, it was revealed that he is the biological father of Esme Prince, who was given up for adoption by her biological mother Heather Webber, after her relationship with Ryan has ended. It is also revealed that Esme is a twin. Years later, Ryan found Esme living with the Princes with a nanny named Maggie Fitzgerald and he convinced her to come to Port Charles to break up Ava's marriage to Nikolas Cassadine by using Nikolas's son Spencer Cassadine. He is aware that he is about to become a grandfather to Esme's unborn child with Nikolas, but he is unaware that Nikolas had her locked up in a storage room in Wyndermere Castle until she gives birth. Nikolas plans to send Esme to Cassadine Island after she gives birth. Unfortunately, on New Years Eve 2022, his daughter Esme set fire to the storage room using a match in order to escape Nikolas, then she intentionally falls off the parapet into the ocean. Esme and her unborn baby were found by Spencer and Trina Robinson at the Haunted Star and was taken to the Hospital, where she was found to have hypothermia and has suffered from memory loss, which his brother Kevin confirmed. He is currently unaware that his daughter Esme was remanded to Spring Ridge until her upcoming trial for revenge porn against Cameron Webber and Josslyn Jacks. After seeing Heather and Esme together, Heather confronts him about knowing that Nikolas is the baby's father and Nikolas is trying to steal their grandchild from them. Heather tells Ryan about the visit from Dante Falconeri and Sam McCall about finding Esme's nanny Maggie Fitzgerald, who knows Ryan, and it's time for them to break out of Spring Ridge and they'll bring Esme with them. After the trio escape from Spring Ridge, they stop by Spoon Island so Ryan can kidnap Ava. While on the island, he holds both Ava and Felicia captive, and the whole situation ends with Mac shooting and killing Ryan, while his daughter gives birth to his grandson, Ace.

=== Reception ===
"I'm the hated envy of all my friends," says Jon Lindstrom, who plays the maniacal Dr. Ryan Chamberlain on General Hospital. "All of my acting friends that is. Not only am I working, but I've also got a great part to play. Ryan is without a doubt the best role I've ever had." "When I started this, I was supposed to be on for 12 weeks --16 weeks tops," says the actor. "I'd come in for a short run since the story was to have a beginning, a middle, and an end." In 2023, Charlie Mason from Soaps She Knows placed Ryan and Kevin as a shared entry (at #33 and #32) on his ranked list of General Hospital's 40+ Greatest Characters of All Time, commenting "Arguably the ultimate good-and-evil-twin pairing, these siblings have been making the residents of Port Charles say, "Oh, brother!" since the early 1990s. And though Ryan's reign of terror is supposedly over, we'll believe it when we don't see it pick up anew."

== Kevin Collins ==
Kevin Collins
- General Hospital character
- Portrayed by: Jon Lindstrom (1993–2026); Anthony Starke (2015)
- Duration: 1993–2004; 2013–2026
- First appearance: December 3, 1993
- Last appearance: January 6, 2026
- Created by: Claire Labine
- Introduced by: Wendy Riche (1993, 1997); Jill Farren Phelps (2004); Frank Valentini (2013)
- Book appearances: Robin's Diary
- Spin-off appearances: Port Charles
In-universe information
- Occupation: First Gentleman; Novelist; Psychiatrist; University Professor
- Father: Victor Collins
- Mother: Melanie Chamberlain
- Stepmother: Mary Scanlon
- Brothers: Ryan Chamberlain
- Wife: Eve Lambert (2000–2001); Lucy Coe (2001–2003, 2004–2014); Laura Webber (2017–present)
- Daughters: Livvie Locke
- Nieces: Esme Prince
- Other relatives: Ace Cassadine

Kevin Collins is a fictional character on the American soap opera General Hospital and its spin-off Port Charles. He was portrayed by Jon Lindstrom on General Hospital from 1993 to May 1997. Lindstrom remained on recurring status with the show appearing sporadically until 2002, while being a main cast member on spin-off Port Charles. Dr. Kevin Collins arrived in Port Charles in December 1993 in an attempt to rehabilitate his twin brother, serial killer Ryan Chamberlain. On January 9, 2013, it was announced Lindstrom would return to General Hospital as Kevin. He first aired on January 30. In 2015, Anthony Starke pinch-hit in the role when Lindstrom was unavailable. Lindstrom departed the role on January 6, 2026.

=== Storylines ===
Dr. Kevin Collins arrived in Port Charles on General Hospital in the early part of 1994. He came to town to help rehabilitate his identical twin brother, serial killer Ryan Chamberlain, who was in a mental hospital. Kevin felt his brother was as much a victim as the women he killed and thought he could help his brother get well with his own therapeutic methods. He had a hard time being accepted by the citizens of Port Charles because he had looked identical to a man everyone feared and hated. Eventually, everyone came around, including Felicia Jones, who was terrorized by Ryan for almost two years. However, her fiancé, Mac Scorpio, was instantly suspicious and hostile to Kevin. Kevin visited his brother, Ryan, several times and thought he was making progress. However, he was unaware Ryan was using him to escape the mental hospital.

One night, Kevin visited Ryan in his room alone. Ryan found out enough about Kevin to knock him out and impersonated him back in Port Charles. Kevin eventually managed to prove to authorities and hospital personnel he was indeed Kevin and not Ryan. He raced to the church to stop Ryan from ruining Felicia's wedding to Mac. After that ordeal was over and Ryan was apprehended, Kevin saw him at the prison and confronted him. Kevin wiped his hands of Ryan again. However, Ryan wasn't through with Kevin. He managed to escape the prison and impersonate Kevin to keep Felicia's baby, Georgie Jones, at General Hospital. Kevin helped Mac and Felicia find Ryan and Georgie in 1995. Ryan killed himself instead of being apprehended. Kevin still felt some guilt by Ryan's fate.

Kevin found himself befriending and counseling Lucy Coe. Lucy came to Kevin with a moral dilemma. He helped her as best he could, but found himself attracted to her while at the same time as he was exasperated with her. They started dating soon after. They got closer when Kevin found himself haunted by the death of his former lover, Grace. Kevin confided in Lucy that Grace had drowned in a car he was in and he was to blame for her death. Lucy helped him work through the past. On June 2, 1997, Lindstrom brought the character to spin-off Port Charles, where he remained until the final episode on October 3, 2003.

On July 16, 2004, Kevin and Lucy return to Port Charles to attend the funeral of Lila Quartermaine.

On January 30, 2013, Kevin returns again and visits Lucy in Ferncliff after she stabbed John McBain, believing him to be Caleb Morley.

In May 2013, he uses his psychiatric skills to aid Lulu Spencer-Falconeri when she has amnesia after being kidnapped by Stavros Cassadine.

In December 2013, Lucy refuses to wed Patrick Drake and Sabrina Santiago due to the fact that she and Kevin's marriage could be over. He was mentioned to be too busy with patients to spend any quality time with Lucy. Felix Dubois, Elizabeth Webber and Sabrina convince her to go through with the wedding.

In May 2014, Kevin finds out that Lucy has been having an affair with Scott Baldwin at the Nurses' Ball and breaks up with her.

In January 2015, Kevin (temporarily portrayed by Anthony Starke) attempts to help Jason Morgan, believing his name to be Jake Doe, remember his true identity. Although, Jason disappears and does not go through with his appointment with Kevin.

In October 2015, Kevin (again portrayed by Jon Lindstrom) returns to Port Charles for an appointment with Anna Devane. Kevin states that he has been out of the country with his patients and reveals that he and Lucy divorced.

Kevin helped Laura solve a mystery involving Helena Cassadine, and the two grew close, eventually starting to date. Kevin accompanied Laura to Cassadine Island and was shot by Valentin Cassadine while protecting Laura. He thanks her for "awakening" him back to life after his breakup with Lucy. After a brief breakup, he and Laura have been together since.

In August 2018, Ryan was revealed to be alive and was hidden away in Ferncliff by Kevin, who was treating him for deep psychosis. Ryan gains the upper hand, attacks Kevin, and switches places with him. As Kevin was stuck in Ferncliff for months, Ryan impersonates Kevin and goes on a murder spree. In March 2019, Kevin was finally rescued from Ferncliff as Ryan was exposed as the killer. Ryan threw himself off a bridge in Niagara Falls to avoid being captured and was presumed dead.

It was revealed that the DVX had contacted Kevin back in May 2018 about taking one of their agents off their hands and Kevin was shocked to learn that the agent in question was his twin brother Ryan and he hid him in Ferncliff for three months. Kevin was arrested due to withholding a fugitive but was released on bail. In April, the charges against Kevin were dropped since he could not have withheld a fugitive if said fugitive was declared dead.

Kevin teamed up with Laura, Felicia, Mac, and Ava Jerome to lure Ryan out of hiding and back to Port Charles by pretending to be a couple with Ava. The plan worked and Ryan returned to Port Charles alive but was captured by the PCPD.

=== Reception ===
In 2023, Charlie Mason from Soaps She Knows placed Ryan and Kevin as a shared entry (at #33 and #32) on his ranked list of General Hospital's 40+ Greatest Characters of All Time, commenting "Arguably the ultimate good-and-evil-twin pairing, these siblings have been making the residents of Port Charles say, "Oh, brother!" since the early 1990s. And though Ryan's reign of terror is supposedly over, we'll believe it when we don't see it pick up anew."

== Victor Collins ==
Victor Collins
- General Hospital character
- Portrayed by: Nicholas Pryor
- Duration: 1997–2003
- First appearance: May 19, 1997
- Last appearance: July 18, 2003
- Created by: Richard Culliton and Karen Harris
- Introduced by: Wendy Riche
- Spin-off appearances: Port Charles
In-universe information
- Occupation: Spy math professor
- Spouse: Melanie Chamberlain (backstory); Mary Scanlon (1999–)
- Children: Kevin Collins; Ryan Chamberlain
- Grandchildren: Livvie Locke; Esme Prince

Victor Collins is a fictional character on the American soap opera General Hospital and its spin-off Port Charles. Nicholas Pryor portrayed the role on General Hospital in the spring of 1997 and on Port Charles from June 11, 1997, to July 18, 2003.

=== Storylines ===
Lucy Coe finds Victor in a convent where he is recovering from mental illness. Kevin Collins had told her that his father was dead. When he recovers from his illness, he returns to Port Charles with Kevin and Lucy. While in Port Charles, he is able to mend his relationship with his son, Kevin, and becomes a suspect in the General Homicide murder mystery. Victor is frequently away from home when his twin sons are little. His wife sexually abuses his son, Ryan Chamberlain. One night his wife abuses Kevin thinking that it was Ryan. When Kevin tells his father, he takes Kevin and leaves Ryan behind. Both sons experience mental illness throughout their lives, but Ryan becomes homicidal.

Victor is held hostage by the General Homicide killer, Greg Cooper, and his sister Julie. Greg claims that he is Victor's son by a woman named Marsha Cooper, who was killed by Ryan when he was little. Eventually, it is discovered that Julie is not Greg's sister. The true paternity of Greg is never revealed.

Victor meets Mary Scanlon and marries her in 1999. Victor is presumed dead, but is actually kidnapped in Italy. Kevin and Mary rescue him. He reappears in 2002 after he and Frank Scanlon find high levels of radiation and a pocket watch in the forest.

== Mike Corbin ==
Mike Corbin
- General Hospital character
- Portrayed by: Ron Hale (1995–2010); Max Gail (2018–2021, 2025)
- Duration: 1995–2010; 2018–2021; 2025
- First appearance: January 4, 1995
- Last appearance: April 28, 2025
- Created by: Claire Labine and Karen Harris
- Introduced by: Wendy Riche (1995); Frank Valentini (2018)
- Book appearances: Robin's Diary
- Spin-off appearances: Port Charles
In-universe information
- Other names: Michael Corinthos
- Spouse: Adela Corinthos (1964–1969)
- Children: Sonny Corinthos; Courtney Matthews
- Grandsons: Dante Falconeri; Michael Corinthos (adoptive); Morgan Corinthos; Spencer Cassadine
- Granddaughters: Kristina Davis; Lila McCall; Avery Corinthos; Donna Corinthos
- First cousins: Gladys Corbin

Mike Corbin (born Michael Corinthos) is a fictional character on the ABC soap opera General Hospital. Soap Opera veteran, Ron Hale first appeared in the role on a recurring basis in January 1995. During an interview in July 2010, Hale announced his plans to retire from acting, though he did not give a definitive time line. Hale last appeared on October 28, 2010. On January 31, 2018, it was announced that veteran actor Max Gail was recast as Mike Corbin. Gail played the role of Mike for three years, winning a Daytime Emmy as Supporting Actor in 2019 and 2021; he (and the character of Mike) left the show in October 2020. Two months later, Soap Opera Digest announced he would reprise the role for a guest appearance, he returned on January 11, 2021. He also made another appearance on September 16, 2021 and on December 17, 2021.

Mike abandoned his wife, Adela, and their son, Sonny when the latter was just a little boy. Mike didn't enter his son's life again until Sonny was an adult, and things were strained. Slowly, the two have developed a cordial relationship, which Mike, an addict, tries to live one day at a time.

— ABC Daytime

=== Storylines ===
Mike is the deadbeat father of Sonny Corinthos, who was born Michael Corinthos Jr., and of the now deceased Courtney Matthews. Mike abandoned Sonny and his mother Adela Corinthos when Sonny was a small child. Sonny resents him for this and blames his father for Adela's later marriage to a police officer, Deke Woods, who brutally abused Sonny. Mike did not see Sonny again until he was an adult. Their relationship continues to be strained. It was further strained when Sonny learned that Mike had a daughter, Courtney, with his former live-in girlfriend Janine Matthews. Janine left Mike after he gambled away all of her money and told Courtney that Mike had died. Mike saw Courtney again when she was an adult. Courtney resented her mother for lying and reconnected with the father she had loved. Mike continues to have a gambling addiction and Sonny has often had to bail him out of trouble. Mike is the manager at Kelly's Diner and is occasionally seen at family functions. Mike is the godfather of Michael Corinthos III. At the boy's baptism, it was established that Mike is a Roman Catholic and is of Irish and Greek descent. Sonny and Mike have slowly developed a bond with each other, and Sonny also forgave Mike for abandoning him as a child.

On November 14, 2008, members in the Russian mafia beat Mike within an inch of his life, then proceeded to torch the restaurant. The diner opened the following year, having been restored to its former glory. In July 2009, Mike rents the vacated room above Kelly's to Dominic Pirelli, the man who will later turn out to be his grandson. Neither of the men know at the time. In January of the following year, Mike again falls off the wagon by playing poker with Ethan Lovett, the bartender at the Haunted Star who was unaware of Mike's addiction. After finding the two men in a quarrel, Tracy throws Mike out of the casino. A few days later, Ethan brings Mike to General Hospital after finding him beaten in an alley. After getting in massive debt for gambling again in early 2011, Mike steps down from managing Kelly's and gets checked into gambling rehab.

In 2018, Sonny brings Mike back to live with the family in Port Charles. He is diagnosed with Alzheimer's disease. Due to the progression of the symptoms, Mike is then admitted into a memory care facility. In 2020, his condition worsens and he refuses to eat. Elizabeth convinces Sonny not to put Mike on a feeding tube and to let him die with dignity. As Mike's body begins to shut down, Sonny, Carly, Jason, Michael, Josslyn, Brook Lynn, Felix and Stella say their goodbyes to him. When he dies, his spirit is greeted by Courtney. He takes her hand and vanishes in the bright light.

== Lily Corinthos ==
Lily Corinthos
- General Hospital character
- Portrayed by: Lilly Melgar
- Duration: 1994–1996; 2001; 2003
- First appearance: May 27, 1994
- Last appearance: October 30, 2003
- Created by: Claire Labine
- Introduced by: Wendy Riche
- Book appearances: Robin's Diary
In-universe information
- Occupation: School teacher
- Father: Hernando Rivera
- Spouse: Sonny Corinthos (1996)
- Sons: Juan Santiago

Lily Elena Corinthos (maiden name Rivera) is a fictional character on the ABC Daytime soap opera General Hospital. Lilly Melgar played the role from 1994 to 1996, and for short stints in 2001 and 2003.

=== Backstory ===
Lily Rivera is the estranged daughter of Puerto Rican crime boss Hernando Rivera. She is impregnated by Miguel Morez when she is 16. Her father puts a hit on Miguel, and his family is forced to smuggle him out of Puerto Rico. Lily is sent to a convent, and her father forces her to give up her baby for adoption. Thinking Miguel is dead and her son is lost, she banishes her father from her life.

=== Storylines ===
When L&B Records launches Miguel's singing career with a concert in Puerto Rico, Sonny Corinthos finds Lily and convinces her to come to Port Charles and reunite with Miguel. Lily gets a teaching job, and Miguel and she try to recapture what they had as teenagers and get engaged. Lily and Sonny become close friends, which makes Miguel and Sonny's girlfriend Brenda Barrett jealous. Sonny finds Lily's six-year-old son, Juan, and they fly to Puerto Rico to meet him. After seeing how happy he is, Lily decides to leave the boy with his adopted family.

Lily overhears a conversation between Lois Cerullo, Ned Ashton, and Mac Scorpio, who have convinced Brenda to wear a wire to get information on Sonny's mob dealings. Lily warns Sonny, who finds the wire and breaks up with Brenda. Miguel and Lily fight over her loyalty to Sonny, which ends their engagement. Sonny and Lily continue to become close. Lily realizes Sonny still loves Brenda, however, and convinces him to try again. They go to Kelly's and see Miguel and Brenda coming out of the shower together after having had sex.

When Sonny faces prison time, Lily begs her father for help. Her father offers Sonny a deal; he will get Sonny free if Sonny marries Lily. Lily hopes Sonny will love her back in time. Sonny does not return her feelings, but nevertheless cares for Lily, so he resolves to make the marriage work. After they get married, Lily insists on keeping her job as a teacher, and refuses to let Sonny's bodyguards shadow her, causing various incidents. Through Lily's efforts, Sonny mends fences with his father, Mike Corbin. She becomes close with many residents of Port Charles. Her relationship with Detective Garcia, however, provokes Sonny's jealousy.

Brenda is devastated when Sonny marries Lily, and is determined to get him back. She convinces Jasper Jacks to help her make Sonny jealous, and they show up everywhere Sonny and Lily go. When Brenda and Sonny are caught in an avalanche, they declare their love for one another. Lily's father finds this out from his accountant, Harry Silver, and threatens Brenda, then tries to kill her. Sonny decides to leave Lily and go into hiding, but before he can tell her, she tells him she is pregnant. Sonny goes to Brenda and tells her he is staying with Lily; meanwhile, Lily leaves him to go back to Puerto Rico. Sonny follows Lily to the airport and begs her to give him another chance.

Unaware of Sonny's newfound devotion to Lily, Lily's father places a bomb in his car. After a celebration party at Luke's Club, where they announce the pregnancy, Lily goes to the car, which blows up when she starts the ignition, killing her and leaving Sonny devastated. Sonny goes to Puerto Rico to see Lily's father, who has a stroke when he finds out he had inadvertently killed his pregnant daughter. Sonny gives him a gun to kill himself; after he commits suicide, Sonny inherits his former father-in-law's territory. Sonny then donates Lily's inheritance from her father, $30 million, to General Hospital to build the Stone Cates Memorial AIDS Wing.

== Harrison Davis ==
Harrison Davis
- General Hospital character
- Portrayed by: Kevin Best
- Duration: 1988–1990
In-universe information
- Occupation: Neurosurgeon
- Spouse: Meg Lawson

Dr. Harrison Davis is a fictional character on General Hospital. He was portrayed by Kevin Best in 1990.

An ambitious and pushy doctor, Harrison was obsessed with Simone Hardy, with whom he had an affair. Determined to have her, Harrison tried to destroy her marriage with the help of Simone's obnoxious mother, and switched the paternity test of Simone's son, Tommy, to make it look like he was the father. When he realized Simone would not leave Tom Hardy, Harrison convinced gullible nurse Meg Lawson to marry him so that he could sue for custody. Simone eventually figured out the truth, and Meg divorced him. When he realized that Casey Rogers was an alien, Harrison called in the Air Force and threatened Anna Devane, who had helped Casey escape. An infuriated Robert Scorpio told him to back off from his family, and Harrison eventually left town after being humiliated in the Casey caper, as he could not prove Casey was an alien.

== Bill Eckert ==
Bill Eckert
- General Hospital character
- Portrayed by: Anthony Geary (1991–93); Joey Luthman (2015)
- Duration: 1991–1993; 2015
- First appearance: February 19, 1991
- Last appearance: April 1, 2015
- Created by: Gene Palumbo
- Introduced by: Gloria Monty
In-universe information
- Occupation: Sailor
- Parents: Fred Eckert; Angela Moscini
- Siblings: Jenny Eckert; Mario Eckert
- Spouse: Nancy Eckert
- Sons: Sly Eckert
- Grandmothers: Beatrice Eckert
- Aunts: Lena Spencer
- First cousins: Joey Moscini; Pat Spencer; Luke Spencer; Bobbie Spencer

William "Bill" Eckert is a fictional character on ABC soap opera General Hospital. He was the redheaded Spencer family cousin that was a dead ringer for Luke Spencer. He was portrayed by longtime General Hospital favorite, Anthony Geary from 1991 to 1993. He later appeared in a flashback on April 1, 2015, played by Joey Luthman, who also portrayed Luke in flashbacks.

=== Storylines ===
Bill Eckert was a member of the crew on the SS Tracy. The Greenbelts, an environmental safety organization, protested the arrival of the Quartermaine boat. It had just exploded and sank in Port Charles harbor. Harlan Barrett of Barrett Enterprises came to Port Charles to salvage the SS Tracy. He was impressed with Bill Eckert, who invented a unique machine which raised the ship. Harlan hired Bill as chief engineer with the promise of upward advancement in the company.

Bill is the cousin of the Spencer family who had just come to town with his young son, Sly Eckert, and recently divorced form his mother, Nancy. Bill's father died of a heart attack and Bill and his sister, Jenny Eckert, came into a large inheritance. Bill, now a wealthy man, moved into an abandoned lighthouse with his son Sly and Finian O'Toole, whom Bill had hired as a housekeeper. Bill was now dating Harlan's marketing genius daughter, Julia Barrett. Harlan brought her to Port Charles to run the cannery with ace in command, Bill Eckert.

Harlan Barrett, Leopold Taub, Cesar Faison, and Larry Ashton formed a cartel to control global business via the use of a toxic substance, carbon disulfide, manufactured at a cannery they purchased as a clever ruse for their operations and a place to brew the drug with which they intended to rule the world. Bill and Jenny were both kept in the dark about the cannery's real intentions.

Meanwhile, Nancy having heard about Bill's newfound wealth, promptly wanted custody of Sly. Bill saw the dollar signs in her eyes and would not give in to her blackmail. Nancy began spying on operations at the cannery and discovered the carbon disulfide. She used it to make Bill appear inebriated at Sly's custody hearing. The Cartel was worried with Nancy poking around and they wanted to make a still clueless Bill their newest member. The cartel then decided to eliminate Nancy.

Faison tried to use mind control to program Anna Scorpio to kill Nancy, but Anna and Robert Scorpio were on to Faison's plan. With the aid of a psychiatrist, she become immune to it. The Cartel's goal was attained anyway as Nancy was mysteriously murdered and Bill was the prime suspect! The real killer turned out to Bill's housekeeper and Sly's baby-sitter, Finian, who had a heated argument with Nancy and accidentally killed her.

Bill was brought into the Cartel, but a deliriously wicked Faison wanted Bill to prove himself before he was completely accepted. Bill's assignment was to kill Faison's nemesis, Robert Scorpio. By this time, Bill and Robert were good friends, so a "faux death" was arranged. Bill shot Robert on the waterfront, but Harlan was not fooled, so he decided to shoot Robert again. Bill shot and killed Harlan to protect his pal. A grief-stricken Julia promptly ended her relationship with Bill.

On Founder's Day, the Cartel was apprehended. Taub was killed and Faison escaped yet again. After Robert and Anna's presumed death Bill started dating Robert's widow Holly Scorpio. Scott Baldwin came across information that pointed to Lucy Coe in a Port Charles art heist. He told Bill and Holly who concluded that Lucy had fed information about the local paintings to the wealthy Richard Halifax. When Halifax realized Bill and Holly were on his trail, he returned of all the art...except Bill Eckert's painting, "Summer in Provence". This was the only painting Lucy did not know about. Halifax professed his innocence but Bill knew he was lying! Then Bill goes to Paris where he reclaimed his artwork and had a fling on the side behind Holly's back, with his old flame, Victoria. When Bill returned to Port Charles, Holly walked in on Bill and Victoria having sex at his lighthouse. The spurned Holly was hell-bent on making the womanizing Bill pay! She smashed all the rare wines in his wine cellar, then left town.

In 1993, Bill and his cousin Luke Spencer came face to face when Lucky Spencer was sent back to Port Charles as his parents were still on the run from notorious mobster Frank Smith. Frank's men found Lucky staying with his friend/cousin Sly Eckert. They also found Sly's father Bill Eckert, who was the spitting image of Luke. Bill was trying to protect Sly and Lucky Spencer from a hitman. Bill was then shot in a case of mistaken identity. He died in Luke's arms.

On April 1, 2015, it was revealed that Bill helped Patricia Spencer conceal the fact that Luke killed his abusive father in a fit of rage on April 1, 1963.

=== Reception ===
In 2021, Richard Simms from Soaps She Knows put Bill on his list of the most hated soap opera characters, commenting that "Characters don't come more iconic than General Hospital's Luke Spencer. The same cannot be said for his lookalike cousin or, for that matter, any of the Eckerts who came to town in 1991. It was both ironic and weirdly appropriate that two years later, Bill would die in the arms of his newly returned cuz.".

== Jenny Eckert ==
Jenny Eckert
- General Hospital character
- Portrayed by: Cheryl Richardson
- Duration: 1991–1994; 1996
- First appearance: February 18, 1991
- Last appearance: April 9, 1996
- Created by: Gene Palumbo
- Introduced by: Gloria Monty (1991); Wendy Riche (1996)
- Book appearances: Robin's Diary
In-universe information
- Other names: Jenny Ashton; Jenny Hornsby
- Occupation: Environmentalist former member of the Greenbelts, an environmental group
- Parents: Fred Eckert; Angela Eckert
- Siblings: Bill Eckert; Mario Eckert
- Spouse: Ned Ashton (1992–1993); Paul Hornsby (1994–2015)
- Sons: Paul Hornsby Jr.
- Aunts and uncles: Lena Spencer
- Nieces and nephews: Sly Eckert
- First cousins: Joey Moscini; Luke Spencer; Bobbie Spencer
- Other relatives: Lucas Jones (adoptive); B. J. Jones (adoptive); Lucky Spencer

Jennifer "Jenny" Eckert (previously Ashton and Hornsby) is a fictional character on the ABC soap opera General Hospital. Cheryl Richardson portrayed the character from February 18, 1991 until February 10, 1994 and briefly on March 31, 1994 and then again on April 9, 1996.

Jenny was a member of the blue-collar Eckert family. An environmentalist, she opposed the entrance of the ELQ Tracy into Port Charles Harbor. She fell in love with Ned Ashton, but soon developed an attraction to Paul Hornsby, who was engaged to Ned's mother Tracy. After Tracy accidentally hit Jenny with her car, Jenny blackmailed Tracy into divorcing Paul and allowing them to be together in exchange for not pressing charges. Paul and Jenny married after Mac and Felicia's aborted wedding, and left town in the summer of 1994.

Jenny shows up at General Hospital in 1996 after going into labor, and Ned helps her give birth to her and Paul's son, Paul Jr.

In January 2015 it was mentioned that Jenny was the executrix of Bill's will and that she had no idea that Bill owned Luke and Bobbie's childhood home. After Paul returns to Port Charles, it is revealed that Jenny has divorced him and taken their son.

== Sly Eckert ==
Sly Eckert
- General Hospital character
- Portrayed by: Glenn Walker Harris Jr.
- Duration: 1991–1996
- First appearance: February 20, 1991
- Last appearance: January 23, 1996
- Created by: Gene Palumbo
- Introduced by: Gloria Monty
- Book appearances: Robin's Diary
In-universe information
- Parents: Bill Eckert; Nancy Eckert
- Grandparents: Fred Eckert; Angela Moscini; Ford Regil; Patty Regil
- Aunts and uncles: Jenny Eckert Hornsby; Lena Eckert Spencer
- First cousins: Joey Moscini; Luke Spencer; Bobbie Spencer; Pat Spencer; Paul Hornsby Jr.

Sly Eckert is a fictional character on the ABC soap opera General Hospital. Glenn Walker Harris Jr, portrayed the character from 1991 until 1996.

== Cesar Faison ==
Cesar Faison
- General Hospital character
- Portrayed by: Anders Hove (1990–present); Ian Buchanan (2012); Anthony Geary (2014)
- Duration: 1990–1993; 1999–2000; 2012–2014; 2018; 2026
- First appearance: March 19, 1990
- Created by: Gene Palumbo
- Introduced by: Joseph Hardy (1990); Haidee Granger (1993); Wendy Riche (1999); Frank Valentini (2012, 2018, 2026)
- Spin-off appearances: Port Charles
- Crossover appearances: Loving
In-universe information
- Other names: P. K. Sinclair; Herr Kreig; Anton Gardner; Duke Lavery (2012); Luke Spencer (2014); Isaac Refson
- Occupation: Head of DVX; Author; Member of The Cartel; Bartender at The Haunted Star
- Parents: Emil Krieg; Sybil McTavish
- Sons: Peter August; Nathan West; Cassius Faison
- Daughters: Britt Westbourne
- Grandsons: James West
- Granddaughters: Louise Jones

Cesar Faison is a fictional character from the ABC daytime soap opera General Hospital. The role has been portrayed off and on by Anders Hove since 1990. In 2023, Charlie Mason from Soaps She Knows placed the character at #37 on his ranked list of General Hospital's 40+ Greatest Characters of All Time, commenting "Any day now, we expect to see a comeback by the psycho whose machinations kept Port Charles on its toes for decades. So unrelentingly wicked was Peter August's Daddy Dearest, he seems like exactly the type to whom even Satan would say, "Oh, hell, no!"" Hove returned to the role in 2026 using his voice only.

=== Storylines ===
Hove as Cesar Faison

Cesar Faison first surfaces in Paris, France in 1990, under the alias P.K. Sinclair, an adventure novelist with a penchant for cigars. In reality, Faison is the former employer of Anna Devane during her days with the World Security Bureau (WSB)'s rival agency, DVX. Also during this time, Faison often makes illicit deals with WSB head, Sean Donely, including one to destroy Anna's marriage to Robert Scorpio.

Faison arranges for Felicia Scorpio-Jones to be abducted, in an effort to distract her husband, Frisco Jones. Faison, with assistance from henchmen Desiree and Jacquess, leads Frisco and Sean on a wild goose chase through his Parisian winery before allowing them to rescue Felicia. Meanwhile, back in Port Charles, Robin Scorpio finds part of a crystal that Faison had been searching for, prompting him to trick Scott Baldwin into selling him Wyndemere Manor. Upon learning that Robin's mother is Anna, whom Faison has long been obsessed with, Faison tosses aside Desiree in order to pursue Anna.

Faison's pursuit of the crystals soon becomes an afterthought as he becomes fixated on marrying Anna. She is reluctant to do so, until Faison threatens to expose her past to Robin. However, Anna is secretly conspiring with Sean, Frisco and Robert to bring Faison down, and they arrange for a man named Remundo to drive Faison away from Port Charles.

A short time later, Anna and Robert about to remarry when Faison resurfaces and is revealed to be a member of the mysterious Cartel. In an effort to keep Sean and Paul Hornsby in line, Faison poisons Tiffany Hill and Susan Hornsby, while hypnotizing Robert and Anna. Along with Mac Scorpio and Bill Eckert, Robert, Anna, Sean, and Paul join forces to bring the Cartel down, while Faison escapes. Faison responds by sending his enemies threatening messages and abducting Anna, attempting to fool everyone into believing she had left of her own free will.

Faison soon realizes that Anna will never be happy without Robin, and uses his mother, Sybil "Nanny" McTavish, to infiltrate the security that Robert has placed around his daughter. However, Faison's efforts are foiled by Robert and Holly Sutton, and he ends up accidentally shooting his mother while she attempts to protect Robert and Holly. Fleeing the country with Robert and Anna in pursuit, Faison is believed to have died in an explosion off the coast of Venezuela.

In the summer of 1993, Faison appears on the ABC daytime soap opera Loving. Faison pursues Ava Rescott, who is in possession of a rare stamp that Faison covets. His ultimate pursuit ends at Universal Studios Florida where Ava is rescued by a mechanical King Kong.

In 1999, Faison resurfaces in Switzerland under the alias of Herr Krieg, a jewel thief that Luke Spencer has been in cahoots with for years. Though Luke is aware of Faison's existence due to his involvement in Robert and Anna's presumed deaths, he had never seen a photo of him. After joining forces with Helena Cassadine, Faison spends nearly a year tormenting the Spencer family, as well as Felicia, and Mac Scorpio, Robert's brother. After abducting Lucky Spencer on Helena's orders, Faison allows Lucky's parents to believe he had died in a fire. After a failed attempt to murder Luke and Felicia, Faison is presumed dead when Helena arranges for an explosion on his boat.

Faison resurfaces almost 12 years later alive, and is revealed to be the mastermind behind the abduction of Robin, as well as other heinous crimes earlier that year, including the presumed death of Jason Morgan. Faison has disguised himself as Anna's husband, Duke Lavery, in an effort to win her affection once more. It's also revealed that he also has Duke where he is holding Robin. Faison is unmasked by Robert, and taken into custody by Interpol. His accomplice, Dr. Liesl Obrecht, however, tries to kill Robin to cover for Faison, but ends putting Robert into a coma when he discovers his daughter alive. Dr. Obrecht later hands Robin over to Jerry Jacks, Faison's accomplice.

In spring 2013, Dr. Obrecht comes to Port Charles, and is revealed to be the mother of Dr. Britt Westbourne. Soon after, it's revealed that Faison is Britt's father. It's later revealed by Britt that her mother was in love with Faison to the point of obsession, but he never cared about her or Britt when she was growing up because of his obsession with Anna.

In Fall 2013, Faison and Obrecht are tasked by Jerry to watch Robin, Nikolas, and Britt while a cure to his poisoning is developed. Faison ends up taking Duke, Obrecht, Luke, and Robin prisoner, but in the end is defeated by Anna and Robert. Anna decides enough is enough, and she and Robert presumably kill Faison once and for all.

Of course, it was later revealed in November 2014 that Faison had escaped death yet again. Anna and Robert had merely trapped him in a small dungeon hidden in Wyndemere, and he escaped nearly a year ago without either of them knowing. Faison is currently in cahoots with Helena, Jerry, Larry Ashton, and the DID influenced Luke Spencer. After he fled Port Charles, the PCPD is no longer looking for him.

In late 2017, Obrecht revealed that Nathan West, her son, is the biological son of Faison. Faison returned to Port Charles in early 2018 after Janice Lomax's resignation as mayor of Port Charles and the PCPD resumed the search for Faison. Faison came after Maxie Jones, Nathan's wife, and held her hostage after supposedly shooting Peter August, her boss. Nathan came to save Maxie, but was shot and later died from his injuries. Faison tried to escape by taking Carly Corinthos hostage, but Jason shot him before he could escape. He was at the hospital, where Peter came to see him, and revealed that he was actually Faison's son, Henrik, whom Faison despised and neglected while Peter was growing up. Peter revealed he intentionally kept Jason alive so he would kill Faison and give Peter his revenge, and Faison had killed Nathan instead of Peter. The shock caused Faison to have a heart attack and die, while Peter looked on in delight.

== Paul Hornsby ==
Paul Hornsby
- General Hospital character
- Portrayed by: Paul Satterfield (1991–1994); Richard Burgi (2015–2016)
- Duration: 1991–1994; 2015–2016
- First appearance: March 18, 1991
- Last appearance: October 5, 2016
- Created by: Gene Palumbo
- Introduced by: Gloria Monty (1991); Frank Valentini (2015)
- Book appearances: Robin's Diary
In-universe information
- Occupation: Financial adviser; Businessman; Attorney
- Parents: Albert Hornsby; Evelyn Hornsby
- Spouse: Tracy Quartermaine (1991–1994); Jenny Eckert (1994–2015)
- Children: Susan Hornsby; Dillon Quartermaine; Paul Hornsby, Jr.

Paul Hornsby, originally played by Paul Satterfield, was introduced in 1991 as the new financial adviser for local conglomerate ELQ Industries. The character was written out on February 10, 1994 and briefly reappearing on March 31, 1994. In 2015, Richard Burgi joined the cast of General Hospital as a recast of Paul.

=== Storylines ===
Drowning in debt after Tracy Quartermaine (Jane Elliot) and her son Ned Ashton (Wally Kurth) run the family company ELQ into the ground, Tracy's brother and sister-in-law, doctors Alan (Stuart Damon) and Monica Quartermaine (Leslie Charleson), hire businessman and attorney Paul Hornsby as the company's new financial adviser. Paul soon falls for Ned's love interest, environmentalist Jenny Eckert (Cheryl Richardson). While Paul's arrival initially ruffles Tracy's and Ned's feathers, Tracy admires his business savvy when he successfully strikes a deal with Harlan Barrett to help salvage a Quartermaine cargo ship. Paul and Barrett are asked by Cesar Faison to join his cartel to control global business. Having poisoned Paul's young daughter Susan, Faison uses the promise of an antidote to force Paul to use his position at ELQ to give Faison control of ELQ's assets. Sonny also forces Paul to compel private investigator Sean Donely (John Reilly), whose wife Tiffany (Sharon Wyatt) has also been poisoned by Faison, to provide information about Robert Scorpio (Tristan Rogers)'s investigation in exchange for a temporary antidote. Though Paul loves Jenny, Faison blackmails him to marry Tracy to get control of her ELQ stock. Tracy and Paul announce their engagement in late August 1991, and Jenny rejects him. Tracy and Paul marry in late October 1991, but when Paul fails to get control of her stock, Sonny orders Paul to kill her so he can inherit it. Paul refuses, and Sonny tries to assassinate him. As Monica operates on Paul, she hears him confess his love for Jenny, and Tracy is very jealous when Jenny rushes to Paul's side. Jenny reveals she is in love with him too, but has insisted they cannot be together as long as he is married to Tracy. Meanwhile, thanks to Paul's efforts, Dr. Tony Jones (Brad Maule) develops a permanent cure for Susan and Tiffany.

Paul plans to end his marriage to Tracy so he can be with Jenny, but Jenny has already agreed to marry Ned. In early 1992, Paul convinces Jenny to call off her engagement to Ned, but then Tracy announces she is pregnant. Jenny rejects Paul, who accuses Tracy of faking her pregnancy, and later questions the baby's paternity. In February 1992, Faison plants a bomb in Jenny's bridal bouquet; Paul discovers it and manages to get rid of it, only to witness Jenny marry Ned. Though Paul and Tracy welcome their son Dillon in May 1992, their marriage is already on shaky ground. Tracy blackmails Jenny into staying away from Paul by threatening to reveal that Jenny had an underage affair with a Senator and suffered a miscarriage when she was 16. Ned discovers Jenny lied about being a virgin and divorces her. Paul discovers Tracy was blackmailing Jenny, and walks out on her. Despite divorcing Jenny, Ned is very jealous of Paul and Jenny's rekindled romance. Ned threatens to leak the story of Jenny's affair with Senator Jack Kensington to the press unless Paul hands over his shares of ELQ. Paul gives Ned the shares to protect Jenny, but Ned leaks the story anyway. Paul steps in to support Jenny.

Later, Tracy accidentally hits Jenny with her car and claims to have witnessed Sonny causing the accident. However, Jenny knows Tracy is the culprit and uses the information to blackmail Tracy into dropping her vendetta against Paul. On February 9, 1994, the wedding of Mac Scorpio (John J. York) and Felicia Jones (Kristina Wagner) is interrupted by Ryan Chamberlain (Jon Lindstrom), Paul and Jenny marry instead.

In 2015, Paul returns to Port Charles claiming a desire to rekindle with Tracy and repair his relationship with Dillon. It is later revealed he has really returned to try and take down Sonny Corinthos (Maurice Benard) while keeping Robin Scorpio-Drake (Kimberly McCullough) away from her family and friends under Jerry Jacks (Sebastian Roché)'s orders as his new accomplice. 2016 reveals Paul was the hospital's serial killer as a twisted plot to avenge the rape of his daughter Susan. In October 2016, he was arrested by Anna Devane (Finola Hughes) and Jordan Ashford (Vinessa Antoine) and sentenced to 30 years in prison for his role in the murders including that of Sabrina Santiago’s (Teresa Castillo). His successor was Margaux Dawson (Elizabeth Hendrickson).

== Chloe Morgan ==
Chloe Morgan
- General Hospital character
- Portrayed by: Tava Smiley
- Duration: 1999–2001
- First appearance: April 30, 1999
- Last appearance: September 4, 2001
- Created by: Robert Guza, Jr.
- Introduced by: Wendy Riche
In-universe information
- Other names: Chloe Ashton
- Occupation: Owner of chloe morgan designs
- Husband: Ned Ashton (1999)
- Aunts and uncles: Eleanor Morgan; Herbert Morgan
- Other relatives: Lila Morgan Quartermaine

Chloe Morgan (formerly Ashton) is a fictional character on the American soap opera General Hospital. The role was portrayed by Tava Smiley from 1999 to 2001.

Chloe was originally introduced onto the canvas as a world-renowned fashion designer, and distant relative to Lila Morgan.

Felicia Jones, who at the time was working on writing Lila's memoirs, makes a trip to Rome to track her down and interview her about Lila.

After she helps Felicia as much as she can, she returns with her to Port Charles to get to know Lila and the Quartermaine family first hand.

Not long after Chloe arrives in town, she meets and falls in love with Jasper "Jax" Jacks. They seriously quickly, but that is halted when Chloe's Aunt Gertrude, arrives in town to claim Chloe's inheritance. Her uncle's will stated that Chloe could retain her inheritance as long as she got married by the upcoming deadline, and if not, the money would revert to Gertrude.

Not wanting to complicate things with Jax (who at the time was still grieving the loss of his fiancé, Brenda Barrett, thought at the time to have been killed by her mother), she decides to sacrifice her inheritance.

With his girlfriend Alexis Davis' blessing, Ned offers to enter into marriage with Chloe. This would just be for show and would continue to allow her and Jax to continue their relationship secretly.

They, along with Alexis, and Jax, attempt to elope in Las Vegas, only to have that plan foiled, when Gertrude shows up, and informs them that without a formal wedding, witnessed in front of their family and friends, her inheritance will not be honored.

Jax and Alexis quickly step in and marry each other, to keep up the ruse and save Chloe's inheritance, and the foursome return to Port Charles. Chloe and Ned soon have their formal wedding and are married. The terms are clear: They must stay married for a year for Chloe to receive her inheritance.

== Jonathan Paget ==
Jonathan Paget
- General Hospital character
- Portrayed by: Greg Beecroft
- First appearance: January 19, 1990
- Last appearance: March 19, 1990
- Created by: Gene Palumbo
- Introduced by: H. Wesley Kenney
In-universe information
- Other names: Duke Lavery
- Occupation: Art dealer

Jonathan Paget, played by Greg Beecroft was introduced in 1990. The character was initially created as a recast of Ian Buchanan's Duke Lavery. However, hedging their bets, the network only offered Beecroft a short-term deal that lasted only seven weeks. Beecroft's Jonathan was killed off on March 19. Jonathan, an art dealer comes to town to work with Sean Donely (John Reilly). However, Paget has a secret—he is actually Duke with plastic surgery, without the Scottish accent. Paget holds off on reuniting with Duke's wife Anna Devane fearing "his" rival Julian Jerome (Jason Culp) is watching. Just before her death, Julian's sister Olivia St. John (Tonja Walker) discovers Paget's identity and alerts Anna. As the couple reunites, Paget is shot by Julian and dies in Anna's arms.

In 2012, the story is retconned and it is revealed that Paget was actually Duke's cellmate during his stay in a Turkish prison. Paget was then sent by the Jerome family to take over Duke's life.

== Casey Rogers ==
Casey Rogers
- General Hospital character
- Portrayed by: Bradley Lockerman
- First appearance: March 23, 1990
- Last appearance: May 28, 1990
- Created by: Gene Palumbo
- Introduced by: Joseph Hardy
- Species: Alien

Casey Rogers, (commonly referred to as "Casey the Alien"), is a fictional character on the ABC daytime soap opera General Hospital. He was portrayed by Bradley Lockerman in 1990, who also played identical character Shep Casey upon Casey Rogers' departure.

=== Casting ===
Lockerman originally auditioned for the role of Jonathon Paget (a.k.a. Duke Lavery). Instead, General Hospital producers created the entirely new character Casey Rogers specifically for Lockerman, who took it as a blessing in disguise. Lockerman stated, "In real terms, it is kind of off the wall, I never in my life thought I'd have this kind of part, but I love it.

=== Storylines ===
Casey Rogers, an alien from the planet Lumina, arrives in Port Charles to be found and befriended by Robin Scorpio. He is searching for the missing part of a crystal that will send him back home. The crystal is discovered to be on Spoon Island with enemy Cesar Faison, who is using the pseudonym P.K. Sinclair. Robin convinces Frisco Jones and her mother Anna Devane that Casey is an alien and together they recover the crystal and Casey is able to return home. That same night, Anna meets Casey's doppelganger Shep Casey, and the two have a brief fling before Shep leaves town.

=== Audience reception ===
The "Casey the Alien" storyline was met with very mixed reviews. It received criticism for its implausibility, but was able to keep some level of fan interest due to the popular actors involved in the storyline.

== Joe Scully ==
Joe Scully
- General Hospital character
- Portrayed by: Robert Miano
- First appearance: February 2, 1995
- Last appearance: May 2, 1995
- Created by: Claire Labine
- Introduced by: Wendy Riche
- Book appearances: Robin's Diary
In-universe information
- Occupation: Mobster
- Spouse: Marie Scully
- Children: Joe Scully, Jr.
- Grandchildren: Trey Mitchell

Joseph "Joe" Mitchell Scully, Sr. known commonly as by his last name "Scully" is a fictional character on the ABC soap opera General Hospital. He was portrayed by Robert Miano from 1994 to 1995.

=== Storylines ===
Offscreen several years before, Deke Woods had beaten his wife, Adela Corinthos, severely. Adela had gone to the hospital with injuries before, but this time, she was unconscious, her face was unrecognizable. An unscrupulous coward, Deke put the blame on her teenage son Michael Corinthos Jr., and sent Marcus Taggert, a new Brooklyn PD recruit whom he was training after him. This set the wheels in motion for years of misplaced animosity, pitting Taggert against Sonny. Later Sonny confided in Scully about what his stepfather, had done to Adela.

The next day, Scully decided to "take care of" Deke, making sure Sonny had an alibi. On Scully's orders, Vince had arranged for Officer Deke Woods to be in an alley beside a nightclub when he went off duty. The club was owned by a lady friend of Scully's, who was not in the mob, but was obviously connected. Scully told her to go out of town for a couple of days so that she would not be an accessory to what went down. And Scully knew that Sonny was at his friend Louie Cerullo's birthday party in Bensonhurst, so he would not be suspected of killing Deke.

Deke was in an alley in Bensonhurst investigating an anonymous tip from an informant about a string of burglaries. Scully put a gun to his head and took Deke's gun from the holster. Deke identified himself as a cop. Scully pressed the gun to the back of Deke's scull. Scully finally spoke, "I know who you are, and I know what you are." Joe then attached the silencer to his own gun. He stepped closer to Deke. "You're a pig, and I don't just mean a cop. You're a coward passing for a man." Deke was now nervous. Vince knocked Deke to his knees and Scully shot Deke in the forehead. Scully then fired one more shot into Deke's chest. When Sonny went to visit his mother in the hospital the following morning, she told him the news about Deke's murder in the line of duty. Sonny instinctively knew that was not true. He knew Scully had killed Deke Woods, to protect him and his mother.

Years later, Scully arrives in Port Charles at the grand opening of Luke and Sonny's blues club. Luke hired Mike Corbin, unaware that he is Sonny's biological father, as Maître d'. Katherine Bell, Lucy Coe's archrival had teamed up with Damian Smith to enact a revenge plot. Damian asked Scully to use his connections to sabotage Lucy's cosmetics company, Deception, by stealing Lucy's supplies and products from the warehouse. In February 1995, Luke's club was firebombed, and Sonny found out that Frank Smith's lawyer, Phil Cusack was trying to move in on Sonny's action. Sonny non-violently dealt with the goons who bombed Luke's, and Cusack was found dead. Sonny's friend and confidant, Harry Silver, informed him that Scully, who had been like a father to Sonny, had ordered the hit on Cusack. Lucy, now working with Luke and Sonny to scam Scully, acts as bait to get back at Damian and Scully. Mike and Luke pull off the heist, leaving Scully agitated. Mike and Luke continue with the scheme and Lucy get Kevin Collins to body slide. While waiting for Kevin to pick her up to take her away for the weekend, Lucy is kidnapped by Scully from the Outback parking lot. Luke and Sonny save her with help from Damian. Scully fires his gun, misses Sonny and the bullet hits Mike instead. Scully is about to shoot him again when Sonny shoots Scully, killing him.

.

== Marcus Taggert ==
Marcus Taggert
- General Hospital character
- Portrayed by: Réal Andrews (1996–2023); Mathew St. Patrick (1997); Asante Jones (2020–2022)
- Duration: 1996–2003; 2020–2023
- First appearance: December 17, 1996
- Last appearance: July 19, 2023
- Created by: Richard Culliton and Karen Harris
- Introduced by: Wendy Riche (1996); Frank Valentini (2020)
- Spin-off appearances: Port Charles
In-universe information
- Occupation: Police detective; DEA agent
- Mother: Florence Campbell
- Half-sisters: Gia Campbell
- Wife: Portia Robinson (divorced)
- Stepdaughters: Trina Robinson

Marcus Taggert is a fictional character on the ABC soap opera General Hospital.

=== Casting ===
The character was portrayed by Réal Andrews from December 17, 1996, to April 1997, February 1998 to May 2003, and from January 2020. Mathew St. Patrick portrayed him from April 1997 to November 1997. Andrews returned to the role on August 19, 2020. In November 2020, it was reported Andrews would temporarily exit the role, due to undisclosed reasons; Asante Jones was named as Andrews' replacement; he first appeared on December 17 and left in early 2021, when Andrews reclaimed the role. Jones briefly stepped in for Andrews again in February 2022. In October 2024, Andrews announced his time as Taggert was "over".

=== Backstory ===
As a youngster, Marcus met Deke Woods, Sonny Corinthos's stepfather and a police officer in Brooklyn. Deke became Marcus' mentor, inspiring the young man to become a police officer himself. Deke was killed by Joe Scully in an alley. Marcus decided to seek revenge. He moved to Port Charles and harassed Sonny every chance he got. His vendetta with Sonny got him into trouble on the job on more than one occasion.

=== Storylines ===
In 1998, Taggert began dating Assistant District Attorney Dara Jensen after pursuing her for quite some time. Taggert could not shake the feeling something more was going on between Dara and Justus Ward than Dara let on.

Taggert and Justus had previously butted heads. Taggert had a prime opportunity to get Justus Ward out of his life for good when a tape came into his possession. On the tape was a confession from Justus, to the murder of Damian Smith, a crime he had committed in 1996, when he caught Damian trying to burn down Ward House, an orphanage founded by Justus' grandmother, Mary Mae Ward.

Taggert brought the tape to Dara's attention. Out of concern for Justus, she asked Taggert to compromise his principles and burn the tape. Because Taggert truly cared about Dara, he complied.

Within a year, Taggert and Dara's relationship came to an end—not because of Justus Ward, but because of Dara's devotion to her job. Taggert felt there was not enough room in Dara's life for both him and her job. When Taggert asked if Dara could devote any more time to making their relationship work, Dara made her choice. She had put as much as she could into their relationship. They parted ways.

Taggert soon took on a new role when he volunteered to look after Juan Santiago after his father, Armando agreed to allow Juan to remain in Port Charles.

In 2000, Taggert was surprised when his maternal half-sister, Gia Campbell, arrived in Port Charles, with Taggert furious to learn she had taken time off from school. Taggert and Gia had a strained relationship at best. Gia even hid her presence from him when she first arrived in town. Shortly thereafter, Taggert's mother, Florence Campbell, also came to Port Charles to be near her children.

Taggert and FBI agent Hannah Scott continued to grow closer and became lovers, despite Dara's warning the trouble she brought the FBI was trouble that followed Hannah everywhere. Taggert, however, continued to enjoy his newfound relationship, and continued to be annoyed by Hannah's friendship with A. J. Quartermaine. Hannah had made it clear to AJ she was involved with Taggert. They would never share more than just friendship. AJ clearly wanted more with Hannah. Hannah's friendship with AJ strained her relationship with Taggert, who reached his breaking point and ended things with her.

Soon the following year, Taggert was shocked to come upon a car accident involving Elizabeth Webber, Courtney Matthews and his sister Gia. Liz's life was threatened by the crash, and Gia was at fault, but Liz had no memory of it.

Taggert became suspicious about his sister's involvement in the car accident, and was certain Nikolas Cassadine was the true guilty party. Gia was an unwitting accomplice. Taggert placed an undercover officer, Sharifa, in Wyndemere to uncover proof of Nikolas's dealings.

At this time, Nikolas' grandmother, Helena Cassadine managed to escape from police custody. Helena took refuge in the tunnels of Wyndemere, where she overheard Nikolas and Gia discussing their cover-up of the automobile accident. Helena blackmailed Gia into helping her escape.

Taggert was shocked when Sharifa uncovered proof Gia was responsible for the accident, as well as helping the fugitive Helena evade the authorities. Taggert confronted Gia and Nikolas with the video evidence, but could not bring himself to arrest his little sister.

By 2003, Taggert was frustrated over the way Scott Baldwin was abusing his power as District Attorney to push his own agenda against Sonny. Taggert wanted to take Sonny down as much as Scott did, but could not agree with Scott's illegal methods. Scott, not wanting Taggert to get in his way, set Taggert up as a scapegoat in Scott's sudden campaign to do away with "dirty cops". Offering Taggert no other choice, Scott forced Taggert to take a job on the police force in Portland, Oregon.

In January 2020, Taggert returns to Port Charles at the invitation of Jordan Ashford. It is revealed that Jordan and Marcus had previously worked together and were concerned that they might be targeted by people that had been incarcerated as a result of the evidence they had obtained against them. It was also revealed that Taggert is the father of Trina Robinson. However, this was later proven to be a lie told to her by her mother and a DNA test in 2023 revealed Curtis Ashford to be her biological father. After an emotional response to the news, Taggert has vanished.

== Bradley Ward ==
Bradley Ward
- General Hospital character
- Portrayed by: Aaron Seville
- Duration: 1994–1996
- First appearance: September 16, 1994
- Last appearance: March 18, 1996
- Created by: Claire Labine
- Introduced by: Wendy Riche
In-universe information
- Occupation: Pastor; Community organizer Activist; State assemblyman
- Family: Quartermaine
- Parents: Edward Quartermaine; Mary Mae Ward
- Stepfather: Dan Ward
- Half-brothers: Alan Quartermaine; Jimmy Lee Holt; David Ward
- Half-sisters: Tracy Quartermaine; Idios Ward
- Spouse: Isobel Ward (196?–1974)
- Sons: Justus Ward
- Daughters: Faith Ward
- Granddaughters: Maya Ward
- Grandfathers: George Quartermaine
- Grandmothers: Ida Zemlock; Miriam Courtnee
- Nephews: Ned Ashton; A. J. Quartermaine; Jason Morgan; Roy Ward; Dillon Quartermaine; Austin Gatlin-Holt
- Nieces: Skye Quartermaine (adoptive); Emily Quartermaine (adoptive); Keesha Ward
- First cousins: Alexandria Quartermaine

Bradley Ward is a fictional character from the original ABC Daytime soap opera General Hospital. The role was originated by Aaron Seville on September 16, 1994, when he began portraying Bradley in flashbacks. Seville last appears on March 18, 1996.

=== Storylines ===
Born in 1945 and raised in Norfolk, Virginia and by his mother, Mary Mae, and stepfather Dan Ward, Bradley died believing he was the biological son of a soldier who died at war. His mother and stepfather moved the family to Port Charles. Bradley married Isobel and together they had two children, Justus and Faith Ward. The fiery Bradley had been elected to congress and began causing trouble for billionaire Edward Quartermaine and his dirty partner Jack Boland. To get Bradley off their backs, Edward's partners, Lee Baldwin, and Boland dug up some dirt on the young politician and reverend. They had learned that Bradley had had multiple affairs, one with secretary, Elizabeth Jackson (Joan Pringle) and another with the 18-year-old daughter of the district attorney, Kylie Quinlan. Kylie carried his baby for a while before she miscarried due to a car accident. But Bradley didn't back off, he came fighting for change. Bradley had also been causing trouble for mob boss Frank Smith who Jack was secretly working with. In the early hours of July 1, 1974, Boland goes to Bradley's house, and kills him. Jack plants the gun in his hand making Mary Mae believe he'd committed suicide. Mary Mae, assuming it was her fault for not telling Edward and Bradley the truth, buries his body in the backyard of their home in Port Charles. In June 1994, his body was discovered and Edward was put on trial for his murder. Mary Mae revealed that Edward was in fact Bradley's father and could have never murdered him.

== Keesha Ward ==
Keesha Ward
- General Hospital character
- Portrayed by: Senait Ashenafi
- Duration: 1994–1998
- First appearance: June 10, 1994
- Last appearance: May 15, 1998
- Created by: Claire Labine
- Introduced by: Wendy Riche
- Book appearances: Robin's Diary
In-universe information
- Occupation: Social worker
- Family: Ward
- Parents: David Ward; Margaret Ward
- Brothers: Roy Ward
- Grandfathers: Dan Ward
- Grandmothers: Mary Mae Ward
- Uncles: Bradley Ward
- Aunts: Idios Ward
- First cousins: Justus Ward; Faith Ward; Maya Ward

Keesha Ward is a fictional character on the ABC soap opera, General Hospital. The role was played by Senait Ashenafi from June 10, 1994, to May 15, 1998.

=== Storylines ===
Keesha Ward came to Port Charles when her uncle Bradley Ward was found murdered in Luke & Laura's yard. She began to date Jason Quartermaine. Her grandmother Mary Mae Ward and Edward Quartermaine did not approve of their relationship. Edward was accused of the murder of her uncle, but was later acquitted. Keesha and Jason went to Paris over spring break where they lost their virginity to each other.

During a car accident in which Jason's brother A. J. Quartermaine was driving drunk, Jason was badly injured and was in a coma. When Jason woke up from his coma he didn't remember anything. He turned into an angry person. Jason's parents Alan Quartermaine and Monica Quartermaine pushed Jason to remember who they were. The more they pushed the less he wanted to do with them and Keesha. Jason went to work for a mobster named Sonny Corinthos. Keesha was crushed.

AJ began to straighten up. Keesha took notice and the two began dating. AJ confessed to his parents that he was responsible for the accident that had injured Jason. AJ got drunk and had sex with Carly Roberts. Keesha was crushed about AJ's involvement in Jason's accident and started to reject him. AJ did not remember having sex with Carly. Carly learned that she was pregnant. After this incident AJ decided to straighten up again and try to get back with Keesha. Carly drugged AJ and left him in an alley to try to stop him from remembering the night they had together. Keesha helped him remember the night and realized that he might be the father. Keesha supported AJ through everything, but his drinking would soon break them up. Keesha moved back to Philadelphia to take care of her sick father.

== Sarah Webber ==
Sarah Webber
- General Hospital character
- Portrayed by: Jennifer Sky (1997–1998); Sarah Laine (2002); Jenny Herbst (2022)
- Duration: 1997–1998; 2002
- First appearance: June 12, 1997
- Last appearance: July 10, 2002
- Created by: Janet Iacobuzio; Christopher Whitesell
- Introduced by: Wendy Riche (1997); Jill Farren Phelps (2002)
- Spin-off appearances: Port Charles
In-universe information
- Occupation: Pediatric cardiologist
- Family: Hardy; Webber
- Parents: Jeff Webber; Carolyn Webber
- Brothers: Steve Webber
- Sisters: Elizabeth Webber; Hayden Barnes
- Grandfathers: Steve Hardy
- Grandmothers: Helene Webber; Audrey Hardy
- Uncles: Rick Webber; Tom Hardy (adoptive)
- Aunts: Terri Webber
- Nephews: Cameron Webber; Jake Webber; Aiden Spencer
- Nieces: Violet Finn
- First cousins: Laura Spencer (adoptive); Tommy Hardy (adoptive); Mike Webber (adoptive); Rick Webber, Jr.

Sarah Webber is a fictional character on the ABC daytime soap opera General Hospital. The role was portrayed by Jennifer Sky from 1997 to 1998, and by Sarah Laine briefly in 2002. In August 2010, Elizabeth and the boys went to visit her for a bit in Northern California. On October 19, 2011, Elizabeth reveals to Matt that her sister, Sarah, is a pediatric cardiologist. On April 2, 2013, Elizabeth mentioned to Audrey that Sarah was in Monterey, California.

== Karen Wexler ==
Karen Wexler
- General Hospital character
- Portrayed by: Cari Shayne (1992–1995); Jennifer Hammon (1997–1999); Marie Wilson (1999–2003, 2024)
- Duration: 1992–1995; 1997–2003
- First appearance: March 27, 1992
- Last appearance: September 2, 2024
- Created by: Maralyn Thoma; Bill Levinson
- Introduced by: Wendy Riche
- Book appearances: Robin's Diary
- Spin-off appearances: Port Charles
In-universe information
- Occupation: Physician
- Parents: Scott Baldwin; Rhonda Wexler
- Siblings: Robert Frank; Logan Hayes; Serena Baldwin; Christina Baldwin (adoptive)
- Spouse: Jagger Cates (1994–1997)
- Grandparents: David Bordisso; Meg Bentley; Lee Baldwin (adoptive)
- Aunts and uncles: Caroline Wexler

Karen Wexler MD is a fictional character from the ABC daytime soap opera General Hospital, and spin-off series Port Charles.

=== Casting ===
The role of Karen was originated by Cari Shayne on General Hospital on March 27, 1992. Shayne left the series on March 30, 1994, and returned briefly from September 29 to October 5, 1995. In June 1997, the character returned as part of the cast of spin-off series, Port Charles, portrayed by Jennifer Hammon. Hammon left the series on June 24, 1999, and was replaced by Marie Wilson, who played Karen from June 30, 1999, to July 1, 2003. In January 2024, Adam Harrington debuted as a recast of Karen's husband, Jagger Cates, who returned to Port Charles after over a 15 year absence. Wilson soon returned as Karen's ghost in a guest starring, recurring role.

=== Storylines ===
Karen was raised by an alcoholic mother, Rhonda Wexler (Denise Galik). During high school, she was involved with Jason Quartermaine (Steve Burton), but she soon met Jagger Cates (Antonio Sabàto, Jr.). Brenda Barrett (Vanessa Marcil) also wanted Jagger, and she schemed to keep Jagger and Karen apart. Eventually, Jagger and Karen were involved, only for her to remember that she was molested by her mother's boyfriend, Ray Conway (Stephen Burleigh). As time went by, she began going to seedy places, where she met Stone (Michael Sutton), Jagger's long lost brother. Stone introduced her to Sonny Corinthos (Maurice Benard). Karen began stripping in Sonny's club, the Paradise Lounge. She also got hooked on pills at this time while she was participating in a summer program at GH for future doctors'. During this time she had a brief affair with Sonny. Jagger and Karen split up. Alan Quartermaine (Stuart Damon) caught her stealing drugs. She confessed the abuse to Gail Baldwin (Susan Brown (American actress)). She and Jagger got back together and they got married when he got accepted into the police academy in Chicago. Alan offers to pay Karen's expenses through medical school. They came back for a brief visit when Stone was dying. Sometime after that they moved to San Francisco where Jagger became an undercover cop. Karen does return to Port Charles in 1999 and works at GH until her death in 2003. When Jagger returns in 2024, Karen appears in Jaggers visions advising him to the right thing and letting go of the past, assuring she will always love him, even after marrying Frank. Karen also appears to Sonny, Scott and Lucy in visions urging them to help and watch over Jagger. Karen also appears to Jagger and Scott at Karen's grave. Karen last appears on August 30 and September 2, 2024 when Jagger died being "Killed" by Sonny and welcomes Jagger into Heaven with Stone.

=== Port Charles ===
Karen returned to Port Charles as an intern at GH, leaving Jagger behind in San Francisco. The physical distance between them soon led to a much more painful distance. Karen and Jagger's marriage crumbled and they were divorced in the winter of 1997. Karen met Joe Scanlon (then Michael Dietz). They started dating. Joe proposed marriage, but they called the engagement off when Frank (Jay Pickett) and Courtney (Sarah Aldrich) made Joe look like a sex addict. However, Karen found out it was Frank framing Joe, but didn't find out Courtney was helping him. Joe and Karen are friends again. Karen and Joe tried again, but ultimately ended their relationship to part as friends. Karen becomes chief resident, facing some resentment from fellow doctors as she had to take a more active role in their cases and decisions. During the nurses' strike, the pressure got to her and she took pills from the GH pharmacy again. Eventually, she admits her addiction to Alan and goes to rehab. Karen drew closer to Frank and they began dating. Around this time, Frank found an old computer at a garage sale which mysteriously connected him Cookie, to a troubled young girl in 1973. By this time Karen's mother, Rhonda, falls off the wagon due to painful past memories. Karen learns of her aunt Caroline who had died at age 18 after being hit by a car. Frank's efforts to help Cookie ended in his successfully persuading not to attend a dance and "go all the way" with a boy who liked her. As soon as he convinced Cookie, Karen vanishes into thin air. Frank finally realizes that he had been communicating with the teenage version of Rhonda and had stopped her from conceiving Karen. By traveling to the past, he corrected history, returning Karen to the time stream. Karen learns of what happened. She and Frank kept the developments as their own little secret.

Karen and Frank are baffled by the behavior of Gabriella, Joe's girlfriend. Her dumping Joe led to him leaving town. Soon after, Frank's EMT partner Emilio (Gaby's brother) was attacked and drained of blood, although not the only patient to have this problem. When Karen and Frank learn of vampires plaguing Port Charles, they join in the efforts to destroy Caleb Morley (Michael Easton), nearly dying when a room they were all in caught fire. Chris Ramsey (Nolan North) secretly is doing experiments on a sample of Gaby's blood. Karen discovered Chris about to inject himself with the syringe, and in their struggle, she was jabbed with the needle instead. Karen begins developing superpowers and an increased libido. The horrible side effect was that she would quickly age and die. Frank secretly made a deal with Chris that he would leave town if Chris gave Karen the antidote. Lucy's angel cousin Rafe steps in and manages to have Karen cured while reuniting Frank and Karen. Karen and Frank had a few happy months, but spring 2002 would begin a great time of upheaval and self-doubt for Karen. First, her best friend Eve Lambert (Julie Pinson)dies, and Karen is too devastated to even finish her eulogy. Next, Frank began behaving abusively on the very night he proposed marriage. He saw her in a red slip and repeatedly called her "whore" and claimed that he "knew what she wanted". He brought up her past as a stripper and said she was worthless. Karen becomes close to Ricky Garza (Eddie Matos), who saved her from Frank's rages a few times. Frank became so out of control that Karen now has to institutionalize him for his own safety after he went at Ricky with a knife. Karen kisses Ricky one day at his apartment. Ricky tells Karen about a magical candle marked DESIRE. He tells her how the candle had been responsible for Frank's condition. Karen then slaps him and accused him of manipulating Frank into going crazy.

Karen gives Frank another chance. One day at the Recovery Room, Frank has another episode with no candles around. As Karen is being interviewed for the local news, Frank thinks she was coming onto the reporter. Frank rips open her blouse and verbally abuses her, humiliating Karen in front of potentially millions of viewers. Karen is laughed at during work, received endless crank calls, and is even asked to pose nude in a men's magazine. Karin begin's to ponder if she liked being bad, if she had enjoyed her days as a stripper. Returning to the Paradise Lounge, she was considering returning as a dancer. Karen meets Ricky at the lounge. He made her dance for him, and as she went through her routine, she realized exactly what he wanted her to – that she felt sick and dirty, not excited. Karen and Ricky grow close. Ricky is the only person Karen could now count on. Karen has sex with him. She told him it couldn't happen again, because of their differences in age and background and personality. Soon Karen and Ricky have sex again. Frank suddenly realizes what the source of his mental illness is and asks Karen to let him prove that he was now sane. Frank lit the DESIRE candle in front of her and didn't go crazy. Karen becomes affected, seeing herself with Ricky. Yet, in spite of her strong feelings for Ricky, she had a long history with Frank and decides to try again. Karen tells Frank she had been intimate with Ricky and thought he understood. What Karen doesn't realize is that he is still unstable, Frank now picturing her in lurid situations with Ricky. In mid 2003, Karen dies when a car hits her.
