= Monti Sharp =

American actor

Monti Sharp is an American actor, best known for his role as David Grant on the daytime US drama Guiding Light. Sharp received professional actor training at the University of North Carolina School of the Arts.

== Career ==
Sharp was the first actor to portray David Grant on the CBS daytime soap opera Guiding Light, which he appeared in from 1992 to 1995. In 1993, he won the Daytime Emmy Award for Outstanding Younger Actor in a Drama Series for his role in GL. He has also appeared in The City (1996) as James, As the World Turns (1997–1998) as Dr. Lewis McCloud, and General Hospital (1998–1999) as Justus Ward.

On stage, he starred in the Off-Broadway premiere of Cheryl West's play Before It Hits Home, as Junior.
