= Mary Mae Ward =

Fictional character from General Hospital

- General Hospital character
- Portrayed by: Rosalind Cash
- Duration: 1994–1995
- First appearance: January 7, 1994
- Last appearance: November 14, 1995
- Created by: Claire Labine
- Introduced by: Wendy Riche
- Book appearances: Robin's Diary
In-universe information
- Other names: Mary Mae Courtnee; Mary Mae Powers
- Occupation: Ran an orphanage at the Ward House; Former Blues singer for L&B Records
- Mother: Miriam Courtnee
- Spouse: Buddy Powers (1944); Dan Ward (1946–1969)
- Sons: Bradley Ward; David Ward
- Daughters: Idios Ward
- Grandsons: Justus Ward; Roy Ward
- Granddaughters: Faith Ward; Keesha Ward
- Grandfathers: Henry Courtnee
- Other relatives: Maya Ward; Isobel Ward; Margaret Ward

Mary Mae Ward (also Courtnee and Powers) is a fictional character from the ABC soap opera General Hospital from 1994–1995. Introduced as a grandmother character running an orphanage, it was revealed through backstory that she had formerly been the mistress of Edward Quartermaine, with whom she had the son Bradley Ward. She is also the grandmother of the late Justus Ward (M'fundo Morrison), Keesha Ward and the great-grandmother of Maya Ward.

== Casting ==
The role of Mary Mae Ward was originated by Rosalind Cash (1938–1995) in 1994, who played her as a proud matriarch character who had triumphed over racism and tragedy. When Cash died of cancer in 1995, the Mary Mae Ward character was written out of the series, with an explanation of having died of natural causes. In 1996, Cash was posthumously nominated for an Emmy Award, for Outstanding Supporting Actress in a Drama Series.

== Storylines ==
Mary Mae Ward shows up in Port Charles after Laura Spencer buys the Ward House. Mary Mae and Laura become instant friends and run an orphanage out of the Ward House. After her son Bradley Ward is found dead in Luke and Laura's yard, Mary Mae's grandson Justus and granddaughter Keesha come to Port Charles to attend Bradley's funeral. It is initially unknown who killed Bradley. Keesha begins dating the young, rich Jason Quartermaine. Mary Mae and Edward Quartermaine, both grandparents of the teens, are not happy about the two dating each other. Soon all evidence of Bradley's death points to Edward as the murderer, and he is arrested and charged. He swears to Mary Mae that he is not her son's killer. Mary Mae knows this and reveals during her testimony that Bradley was Edward's son; Edward had a wartime romance with Mary Mae when she was a blue singer years ago, which results in the conception of Bradley. Edward is later acquitted. Mary Mae finds herself singing the blues again when Lois Cerullo offered her a job at her record label, L&B. Mary Mae is popular at Luke's club and she is adored by many in Port Charles. When she dies in her sleep in January 1996, everyone in town turns out to pay their respects to Mary Mae.

== Reception ==
Stephanie Holland from The Root placed Mary Mae on her list of the most memorable black characters from American soap operas, writing that Mary Mae "shook up Port Charles with her revelations about Edward Quartermaine's past. She had that familiar loving honesty that Black families know so well, which made her feel like an old friend, not a TV character."
