= Marie Wilson (soap opera actress) =

American-Canadian soap opera actress (born 1974)

- Born: Marie Flevaras; October 12, 1974 (age 51); Athens, Greece
- Occupation: Actress
- Years active: 1999–present
- Spouse: Michael Wilson (m. 1996; div. 2018)
- Children: 1

Marie Wilson (born Marie Flevaras; October 12, 1974) is a Canadian actress, known for her roles on the daytime soap operas General Hospital, Port Charles and As the World Turns. In 2016, she starred on the NBC daytime soap opera Days of Our Lives in the role of Summer Townsend.

== Life and career ==
Wilson was born in Athens, Greece, but raised in Toronto, Ontario, Canada. She married Michael Wilson on December 31, 1996, and they have a daughter, Skye Alexandra (born February 12, 2001). She began her career as a model before making her screen debut with the role of Karen Wexler in the ABC daytime soap opera, General Hospital. She appeared on the show from 1999 to 2003 and also was a regular cast member on Port Charles from 1999 until her character was killed off in 2003.

In 2005, Wilson was cast as Meg Snyder in the CBS soap opera, As the World Turns. She succeeded Jennifer Ashe, who was in the role from 1986 to 1989. In April 2010, following the cancellation of the series, it was announced that Wilson would exit the series prior to its September 2010 finale. In 2012, Wilson guest starred in the CBS crime drama Criminal Minds. In October 2014, she joined the cast of NBC soap opera, Days of Our Lives in the recurring role of Bree Tjaden, which she held until early 2015. In October 2015, it was announced she would again appear on Days of Our Lives, this time in a newly created role. Wilson made her first appearance as Summer on February 5, 2016. She departed later in the year, but returned briefly in January 2020. Wilson returned to General Hospital in a guest starring recurring role as Karen appearing in Jagger Cate's visions and welcomed Jagger into heaven when the character was killed off.

== Personal life ==
She was previously married to Michael D. Wilson from 1996 to 2018 and had one daughter, Skye Alexandra (born 2001).

== Filmography ==
Year	Title	Role	Notes
1999	And the Beat Goes On: The Sonny and Cher Story	Mary Bono	Television film
1999–2003	Port Charles	Karen Wexler	Series regular
1999–2003	General Hospital	Karen Wexler	Recurring role
2004	Guarding Eddy		
2005–2010	As the World Turns	Meg Snyder	Series regular
2012	Awaken	Lisa Arai	
2012	Criminal Minds	Lynne Noble	Episode: "Hit"
2014–15	Days of Our Lives	Bree Tjaden	Recurring role
2016, 2020	Days of Our Lives	Summer Townsend	Series regular
2017	Say You Will	Ruth	
