= Edward Quartermaine =

Fictional character from General Hospital

- General Hospital character
- John Ingle as Edward Quartermaine
- Portrayed by: David Lewis (1978–1993); Les Tremayne (1987–1988); John Ingle (1993–2004, 2006–2012); Jed Allan (2004–2005); Uncredited (2014, 2019)
- Duration: 1978–2012; 2014; 2019
- First appearance: 1978
- Last appearance: May 1, 2019
- Created by: Douglas Marland
- Introduced by: Gloria Monty
- Book appearances: Robin's Diary; The Secret Life of Damian Spinelli
- Spin-off appearances: Port Charles
In-universe information
- Other names: J.L. Holt; Elliott Thompson; Edward Louis Quartermaine
- Occupation: Founder/chairman/principal shareholder of ELQ Enterprises; Board member at GH
- Family: Quartermaine
- Parents: George Quartermaine; Ida Zemlock
- Wife: Lila Quartermaine (1945–2004) (Note: Edward and Lila's first wedding in 1945 was proven to be invalid in January 1983. They remarried in March of that year); Heather Webber (2004)
- Sons: Bradley Ward; Alan Quartermaine; Jimmy Lee Holt
- Daughters: Tracy Quartermaine
- Grandsons: Justus Ward; Ned Quartermaine; A. J. Quartermaine; Jason Morgan; Drew Cain; Austin Gatlin-Holt; Dillon Quartermaine
- Granddaughters: Skye Chandler (adoptive); Faith Ward; Emily Quartermaine (adoptive)
- Grandparents: Edgar Quartermaine; Martha Quartermaine
- Nieces: Alexandria Quartermaine
- First cousins: Herbert Quartermaine
- Other relatives: Quentin Quartermaine; Celia Quartermaine; Maya Ward; Brook Lynn Quartermaine; Michael Corinthos; Jake Webber; Danny Morgan; Scout Cain; Lila Rae Alcazar (adoptive)

Edward Quartermaine is a fictional character from General Hospital, an American soap opera on the ABC network. The character was created in 1978, originally played by David Lewis. John Ingle stepped into the role in 1993, and besides a brief hiatus from 2004 until 2006, he portrayed Edward up until his death on September 16, 2012.

== Casting ==
David Lewis originated the role of Edward in 1978. In 1987 and 1988, Les Tremayne stepped in temporarily due to Lewis' health. Starting on May 3, 1989, Lewis was forced to step down due to his illness. The character was killed off in a plane crash, but Lewis' voice was still heard whenever Lila spoke to her late husband's ghost. After recovering, Lewis returned as Edward on November 26, 1991. His health declined again and he left as the role was recast with John Ingle on August 17, 1993. Ingle received an award for Outstanding Scene Stealer at the Soap Opera Awards in 1999. Ingle was fired in December 2003, and the show planned to again kill off the character, but a last minute storyline change kept the character and Ingle on in a recurring capacity. However, Ingle opted for a contract role of Mickey Horton on Days of Our Lives, and Jed Allan was brought on to play Edward starting on March 1, 2004. In 2006, Allan was let go when Ingle was released from his Days of Our Lives contract and was re-hired for the Edward Quartermaine role. Allan last appeared on December 30, 2005. Ingle reprised the role on April 18, 2006. Following a decline in health and the death of his wife, rumors began circulating that Ingle's Edward was being written out.

In September 2012, soap opera gossip site, Daytime Confidential reported that Ingle could possibly be making his last appearance. Former General Hospital scribe, Michele Val Jean also commented on Ingle's potential departure through Twitter. Ingle died on September 16, 2012. He filmed his final scenes on August 24, and the episode aired on September 11, 2012. Uncredited actors portrayed the role briefly in 2014 and 2019, when the character appeared as a ghost to help escort A. J. Quartermaine and Oscar Nero to heaven.

== Character background ==
Edward was born on September 2, 1918 (according to the date in the family crypt). Edward and his wife Lila are considered to be two of the wealthiest individuals in the fictional town of Port Charles, New York. Edward is the Founder & Chairman, former CEO, and principal shareholder of E.L.Q. Industries. Many of his storylines involve health concerns, such as multiple heart attacks, a bout of amnesia in 1989, a stroke and faked coma, and a time in 2004 when his daughter Tracy had him committed to the Shadybrook Sanitarium, though he later escaped with the assistance of Luke Spencer. Portrayer John Ingle describes, "Edward likes to think that he's taught everyone around him how to be ruthless."

== Storyline ==
=== 1970s ===
Edward first showed up in Port Charles in 1978, making occasional visits to Port Charles with his wife Lila before moving in with his son, Alan and daughter-in-law, Monica. Edward quickly established himself as one of the most influential residents of Port Charles, becoming a member of the hospital board and a good friend to Steve Hardy and Lee Baldwin. Edward and Lila liked Monica, but warned her about their daughter, Tracy Quartermaine, who wanted to get the Quartermaine estate for her son, Ned Ashton. Edward was thrilled when Monica gave birth to a son, Alan James Quartermaine Jr., whom he hoped would inherit the Quartermaine estate one day. Edward decided to test daughter Tracy's loyalty after she tried to prove that Alan Jr. was fathered by another man, by pretending to have a heart attack. He created a will that would disinherit Tracy, but before he could sign it, he collapsed on the floor. He pleaded with Tracy to give him his heart medicine; she refused unless he promised not to sign the will. Tracy had failed the test, and Edward banished her.

=== 1980s ===
Edward teamed up with his niece Alexandria Quartermaine to make money with her friends, Victor and Tony Cassadine, by finding the Ice Princess. The plan quickly got out of hand as the Cassadines planned to use the secret formula hidden in the Ice Princess to take over the world. Luke Spencer thwarted the plan in time and Alexandria wound up dead in the end. Alexandria's will left her ELQ shares to Lila. Edward tried to acquire the shares, but Lila was wise to his game. Edward became involved in Luke Spencer's schemes to make money, with little success. When Holly Sutton arrived in town, Edward immediately schemed to become financially involved in her alleged oil discovery, and charmed her in order to try to get in. When it was revealed that Holly's family, the Durban's, were perpetrating an oil scam, Edward blamed Luke for the whole mess.

The Quartermaine's biggest problem arrived in the form of Susan Moore, Alan's ex-mistress and mother of his son, Jason. She and Crane Tolliver, Lila's first husband, had proof that Lila had never officially divorced him; this meant that Lila and Edward weren't legally married, and Alan and Tracy were illegitimate. Susan then blackmailed the Quartermaines with Crane's information. When Susan was killed, the whole Quartermaine clan was a suspect. Edward was concerned that the presence of Celia Quartermaine might cause Edward to lose ELQ because of the scandal. However, the real killer was Crane, who was exposed by Jimmy Lee Holt, Edward's son by Beatrice LeSeur. Lila and Edward were later married legally. Beatrice appeared in Port Charles to blackmail the Quartermaines, but she dropped dead at a charity gala, before she got the chance. Edward was suspected of poisoning her, but it turned out Beatrice had accidentally killed herself. Edward discovered what it was like to be broke when Monica and her new flame Sean Donely, found their way into ELQ's boardroom and took the company away from the Quartermaines. Monica then threw the Quartermaines out of the mansion, and they were forced to live above Kelly's. Lila rescued their family by starting a new business she called "Pickle-Lila," which was a success and restored the Quartermaines' fortune and lifestyle. When Edward's cousin, Herbert, was killed, Edward was one of the suspects in Herbert's murder, but was proven innocent.

While the Quartermaines remained important figures in Port Charles, things remained pretty calm for Edward at ELQ. Edward helped Alan fake his death during Monica's affair with Sean, but eventually helped reconcile the couple. News of Tracy's return after a decade of banishment threatened Edward's health; he was in bed, allegedly sick with a cold. Their reunion had Edward grabbing his heart medication from his dresser, leaving Tracy to remember her actions as a greedy young woman. Edward disappeared shortly after Tracy's return, and was presumed dead when he went on a fishing trip to the Bermuda Triangle. He rewrote his will, leaving everything to Ned, much to the family's dismay.

=== 1990s ===
Two years later, Anna Devane found Edward playing beach bum in the Bahamas and dragged him back to civilization. He teamed up with Ned and got ELQ away from Paul Hornsby. In 1993 Edward banished Tracy a second time after she ran down Jenny Eckert. Edward set his grandsons against each other by loaning A.J. money to buy into the Port Charles Hotel, which was Ned's domain. Edward was arrested and tried for the murder of Bradley Ward, whose body had been discovered on the Spencers' front lawn. Just as it seemed certain that Edward was going to be put in prison, Bradley's mother Mary Mae Ward took the stand. She revealed that Bradley was Edward's son from the affair that they had during the war. Edward was then acquitted. Though Edward never knew his son, Bradley, his grandson, Justus Ward, was in Port Charles. Justus and Edward formed a bond when Edward set up a foundation to help businesses on Charles Street.

Edward became so anxious to shut down Ned's singing career that he bought Ned's record company, L&B, right out from under the noses of Ned's wife, Lois, and her business partner, Brenda Barrett. Lois got her company back with the help of Jasper "Jax" Jacks, and Jax got a spot on the ELQ board, which did not make Edward happy, especially when Jax teamed up with Tracy to take over ELQ. When this plan came to light, Edward banished his daughter a third time. When Edward found out Jason fathered a child, Michael, Edward became obsessed with bringing Michael home. He even tried to kidnap the child. This plan drove Justus away from the family and into the mob with Jason. Growing frustrated, Edward promised A.J. the CEO position at ELQ if he could bring Michael home to the Quartermaines, pitting him against Ned. A.J. couldn't believe his luck when it was revealed that Jason wasn't Michael's father – A.J. was. Edward was thrilled as well, but he was forced to eat his words when A.J. was able to bring Michael into the Quartermaine fold by marrying Michael's mother, Carly. A.J. threatened to leave with his new family if Edward didn't fork over the CEO position. So A.J. was appointed as CEO, and Ned left, telling Edward that he would not come in and save the family again.

Edward tried to keep a long lost family secret from being found out by Luke Spencer and Felicia Scorpio. Despite Edward and Reginald's efforts, Luke and Felicia discovered what they thought was the truth: Edward had killed Lila's fiancé, Elliot Thompson, and married her in his place. Edward initially denied it, and then told them they were right. But Lila refused to let her husband take the blame and revealed the truth: she had killed Elliot in self-defense. The crime was covered up by the family. Luke and Felicia agreed to keep the murder a secret. Edward tried to ruin Ned and Chloe Morgan's sham of a marriage. He needed Ned back as CEO of ELQ, so he paired with Chloe's aunt, Gertrude, who also wanted to ruin Chloe's marriage. Edward planned to destroy Ned's record company, and then Gertrude would get her design company. Edward couldn't seem to make his plan work. When Chloe was the victim of a hit and run, Edward dropped his vendetta against the marriage, but not his plans to get Ned back at ELQ. However, Ned had no intention of returning to ELQ and managed to thwart Edward's plans yet again. All of Edward's efforts to keep Carly and Michael failed when Jason produced evidence that A.J. was responsible for burning down Jason and Sonny Corinthos' warehouse earlier that year. Sonny used the evidence to blackmail A.J. out of his parental rights, and igiving Carly a divorce. Edward was furious with A.J., kicked him out of ELQ, vowing to make him pay.

=== 2000s ===
Edward tried to recruit Jax as CEO, in hopes that Ned would swoop in to save the company. Ned remained true to his promise, though, of not returning. Jax forgot about ELQ, though, to go after a drug company. Jax sold his shares of ELQ, which had come from A.J. and Tracy, to Edward. Edward then took over as CEO.

Over the next several months, Edward's granddaughter, Emily was kidnapped, A.J. became an alcoholic again, and Ned announced his engagement to Alexis Davis. When Emily fell for her kidnapper, Zander Smith, Edward tried to keep them apart. Emily was nearly killed in a shootout after Zander's release, and she was sent away to boarding school amid her protests. Lila sided with Emily and against Edward, as did the household staff. Zander found Emily and they returned to Port Charles, but Emily refused to live at the mansion. Desperate to keep Emily and Zander apart, Edward faked his own mugging and blamed Zander. Zander was arrested and Edward promised to drop the charges if Emily stopped seeing Zander. But the truth about the mugging came out and Emily continued to see Zander.

In 2001, Skye Chandler arrived, announcing that she was the daughter of Alan and Rae Cummings. Unbeknownst to Alan, Edward sold the baby and had the doctor tell Rae that the child had died. Edward hoped to use Skye to his own ends, not realizing Skye had payback on her mind. She managed to ELQ away from Edward. Edward suffered another heart attack, and grew close to his nurse, Melissa Bedford. He cut his family out of his will and put her in. He later took Melissa out of the will, at Alan's request, and Alan's suspicions about Melissa were later proven correct. Edward was blackmailing Skye so she would give him the CEO spot. But Skye turned the tables and came clean about her secrets. Lila appointed Edward co-CEO of ELQ with Skye; Edward had no choice but to accept Lila's decision. Edward and A.J. conspired to use A.J.'s new bride, Courtney, to get Michael back from Carly and Sonny, Courtney's brother. But A.J. actually fell in love with Courtney, and refused to continue their plans. The newlyweds moved out and Edward froze A.J.'s accounts. Edward also bribed Courtney's mother into not giving any money to the couple.

Edward then went to battle against Jax, and used Skye as his pawn. By the time Skye wanted out of her deal with Edward, he blackmailed her to cooperate. Edward had a stroke while arguing with Skye, lapsing into a coma. Uncertain of Edward's chances of a recovery, Lila appointed Ned CEO of ELQ. Ned found out about Skye and Edward's agreement, and Skye was forced to tell Jax. Hurt, Jax broke up with Skye. In a drunken stupor, Skye was afraid that she'd pulled the plug on Edward's life support and went to Jax for help. Jax and Ned staged an argument in Edward's hospital room and tricked him into coming out of his "coma," which they knew was a fake. Edward then admitted that he had pulled his own plug to set Skye up. Edward tried to get back ELQ, as well as get ahold of Ned and Alexis' unborn child. Ned refused, and fought Edward. Edward became suspicious that Alexis' child was actually Sonny's, and tried to strike a bargain with Sonny, but Ned had anticipated this move and thwarted Edward.

Edward conspired with Faith Rosco to teach Ned a lesson. Faith soon proved to be a loose cannon, and Edward cut ties with her. When Alexis was put on trial for Luis Alcazar's murder, Edward conspired to get custody of her daughter, Kristina. He made sure Ned got full custody of Kristina, but when Ned refused to move into the house, Edward set fire to the gatehouse where Ned was staying, hoping to force them to move into the mansion. The plan nearly backfired, but the Quartermaines got custody of Kristina. Soon after, Kristina was kidnapped by Skye and A.J. because Edward hadn't delivered on his promise to give A.J. the CEO position. Alexis then took the baby, but Kristina was later returned home by Emily and Zander. Edward was later blackmailed into letting Alexis see Kristina.

Tracy blew back into town just long enough to reveal that Skye was not a Quartermaine and to leave her son Dillon to live with his grandparents. Edward booted Skye off the board at ELQ, and was not happy to have Dillon left behind for him to take care of. Edward hired an English butler named Dobson, and told him to keep Kristina away from Alexis; Edward didn't realize that Dobson was really Alexis in disguise. The truth finally came out, but his attentions had been turned to Dillon, who was seeing Georgie Jones. Edward tried to forbid Dillon from seeing Georgie, but it didn't work. Dillon had an affair with Lulu Spencer, and she got pregnant. Desperate to get ahold of the unborn child, Edward threatened Lulu with a lawsuit when she decided to have an abortion. Lulu's father, Luke, held off Edward, and Dillon later supported Lulu, telling Edward to back off.

The family rallied around Emily when she was diagnosed with breast cancer. Certain she was going to die, she shared an impromptu bedside wedding with Zander. Emily recovered, and Edward welcomed Zander to the family. It wasn't long before Emily and Zander split up because she had fallen for Nikolas Cassadine. When she announced her engagement to Nikolas, Edward and the rest of the family were less than thrilled, as the Cassadines were flat broke. But right around that time, A.J. secretly emptied the family's bank accounts and took off, leaving the Quartermaines broke, as well. Edward was thrilled when Emily and Nikolas found a treasure on a sunken ship owned by a Quartermaine ancestor that could restore the family fortune. However, Edward was unwilling to share the fortune with the Cassadines, and made his opinion known to the happy couple. Sam McCall then skipped town with the treasure, and Edward had to find another way to get his fortune back. On the night of the auction for the treasure, the Port Charles Hotel burned down, trapping the Quartermaines inside. Lucky Spencer was in the process of arresting Edward for criminal negligence when he suffered a near fatal heart attack. Another all-time low came for Edward when Lila died in her sleep. After a heart wrenching goodbye, Edward faced life alone.

Heather Webber married Edward to get her hands on Lila's fortune. The plan failed when Justus was named Lila's heir, and Heather tried to kill Edward. Luke and Skye caught on to her plan, and set Heather up. She went crazy, and Edward had the marriage annulled, then shipped her off to Shadybrook. Edward lived through losing many family members – A.J., Justus, and Alan. Luke was the one who helped him move past losing his family. Edward was eager to provide for Elizabeth Spencer's son, Jake, when he suspected Jason was Jake's father. Edward, Monica, and Alice cornered Lulu, but Lulu told them that Jason was not Jake's father, and Edward was crushed. The Quartermaines suffered another devastating loss when Emily was killed by Diego Alcazar. Skye was the one to tell Edward about Emily, and before breaking down in her arms, he told her the story of how he had always wanted to be like Joseph F. Kennedy Sr., but as Kennedy's life progressed, his life fell apart. Edward feels his life has become like this and he has turned into a kind of poison. He even goes as far as telling Skye to leave town before she dies too.

Edward tried to make Monica realize that Jason was not to blame for Emily's death. and get her to make peace with him, but she refused. Edward has lately, like many other veterans, fallen into the background. He developed a minor crush on Claudia Zacchara and disapproves of Lulu dating Johnny Zacchara. When he finds out that Luke and his house staff play cards on Tuesday nights, he is upset because he was not invited. He has softened in his old age. Edward was crushed to hear about Michael's shooting, and Tracy decided to invent some problems at ELQ to take his mind off his grief. Edward had been put on jury duty for Johnny's trial for the murder of Logan Hayes. He openly expresses his disdain for being there. When Carly decided that Michael should live at the Quartermaine Mansion after he recovered from his coma, Edward was happy, but he also tried to get Jason to move back home too, but Jason declined. In September 2009, Edward and his girlfriend Deidre Evans were on a date when he socialized with the mayor's wife, Andrea Floyd. When Andrea realized that Edward could implicate her in the murder of her husband's mistress, Andrea poisoned Edward's drink, resulting in him having a heart attack while driving to the hospital carnival, endangering many lives there. In an ironic twist, one of Edward's victims was Andrea herself.

=== 2010s ===
In January 2010, Edward invites his great granddaughter Maya Ward to Port Charles to live at the mansion. Edward tried using his pull at the hospital to get Maya special treatment as an intern, but she assured him that she didn't need his help. Lulu tried getting Edward and Tracy to pull strings to have Michael's murder charges dropped, but after trying numerous times, they admitted that with Corinthos as his last name, Michael would be given the full extent of the law.

Edward was beyond thrilled when his great-granddaughter Brook Lynn Ashton returned to Port Charles penniless. While Edward offered her a full education at PCU, a room at the Quartermaine Mansion, and unlimited funding, she declined, only to turn up at the mansion looking for a place to stay. Before she even moved into her room, Edward, Tracy, and Monica caught her transferring money from Edward's bank account to hers. While it infuriated Monica and Tracy, it made Edward proud. Edward and Monica were sick of experiencing Tracy's wrath after Luke left her, and pushed the couple back together so Tracy would be nicer to them. Edward also offered Maya and Ethan Lovett a million dollars each if they could stay married for a year. They reluctantly took him up on his offer.

While Edward seemed quite content over Brook Lynn's relationship with Nikolas Cassadine, he despised Brenda's engagement to Sonny. He even went as far as refusing to walk her down the aisle. While the wedding went through much to his dismay, Edward seemingly enjoyed the reception as he spent time with his family. Edward was devastated later in the evening when Brenda's limo exploded. He arrived at the scene in his pajamas and had to be calmed down by Michael and his girlfriend Abby Haver. While the woman in the limo turned out to be an alive Sam McCall, the event still took quite a toll on Edward. Luke brought him home to Tracy where he remained quite shaken and even a bit forgetful. After Michael's graduation from high school, Edward pitched the idea of having Michael intern at ELQ. Jason told him that Michael already had a job working for Sonny, but it was up to Michael to make that decision. Not giving up, Edward offers Abby a well paying job at ELQ if she gets Michael to work there alongside her. Edward is delighted when Michael accepts his offer, much to Sonny and Carly's dismay.

Edward attends a charity event hosted by Carly at the Metro Court, but has chest pains and nearly collapses in the lobby, Skye brings him up to her room. After saying that he's had too much excitement that night, Sonny bursts in with a gun pointed at Skye and Edward, demanding to know where Jax is. When Olivia tells Edward that Jason's been in a car accident, he and Skye head to the hospital. While Edward is sitting with Jason, Sam comes in and tells him that they're engaged, delighting Edward. A few days before Jason and Sam's wedding, Edward visits Jason and gives him Lila's wedding ring to give to Sam. On Christmas Eve, Edward tells Monica and Tracy that the year Lila died, she was planning on getting him monogrammed cuff links. Tracy sends Alice to the jewelry store to pick up a pair, but the store closes before Alice can get there. When Edward opens a present left for him under the tree, he finds a pair of monogrammed cuff links.

When the town's water supply is contaminated, Tracy is seemingly immune to the effects of the pathogen, and decides to undergo tests in order to see if her blood could be used to create an antiserum. Dr. Patrick Drake is able to synthesize a single dose, which Tracy steals to give to Edward. A frail Edward, wise to Tracy's plans, refuses to take the antiserum, and instead requests that she give it to Patrick's daughter Emma Drake. A tearful Patrick gets Emma to drink it, as Edward looks on and smiles. In November 2012, Monica informs Tracy that Edward's health is in decline. A devastated Tracy refuses to allow a recently returned A.J. to see Edward, but permits Michael and Sam to say their goodbyes. Sam introduces Edward to her and Jason's son, Daniel Edward Morgan, named after Edward. Tracy eventually comes around, and allows A.J. to say his goodbyes to Edward, but he dies before he has the opportunity to do so. A.J. was devastated at not being able to apologize for his past misdeeds. Monica discloses that Edward's final word was the name of his beloved Lila.

Following his funeral, Edward's will is read, which divides ELQ stock between his grandchildren, great-grandchildren, Monica, and Alice. He donates all of his cash and material belongings to charity, cutting Tracy out. The only thing left to Tracy is a jar of Pickle-Lila relish.

== Reception ==
In 2019, Dustin Cushman from Soaps She Knows's Soap Box said that he was "still on the fence about them bringing Lila and Edward in to lead Oscar to the light", but acknowledged that other viewers liked it. In 2023, Charlie Mason from Soaps She Knows placed Edward at #26 on his ranked list of General Hospital’s 40+ Greatest Characters of All Time, commenting that "They don’t make ’em like this anymore! The patriarch of the Quartermaine family was a blustering tyrant whose huffing and puffing did a fine job of hiding the fact that, underneath, he was really a big softy."
