= Dillon Quartermaine =

Fictional character from General Hospital

- General Hospital character
- Robert Palmer Watkins as Dillon Quartermaine
- Portrayed by: Kevin and Michael Jacobson (1992–1993); Scott Clifton (2003–2007); Robert Palmer Watkins (2015–2017); (and others)
- Duration: 1992–1993; 1996–1997; 2003–2007; 2015–2017
- First appearance: May 22, 1992
- Last appearance: October 12, 2017
- Created by: Maralyn Thoma and Bill Levinson
- Introduced by: Wendy Riche (1992, 1996); Jean Dadario Burke (1996); Jill Farren Phelps (2003); Frank Valentini (2015)
- Crossover appearances: The City
In-universe information
- Other names: Dillon Albert Quartermaine Hornsby
- Occupation: Film producer; Photographer; Director's assistant
- Family: Quartermaine
- Father: Paul Hornsby
- Mother: Tracy Quartermaine
- Half-brothers: Ned Ashton; Paul Hornsby, Jr.
- Half-sisters: Susan Hornsby
- Spouse: Georgie Jones (2006)
- Grandparents: Edward Quartermaine; Lila Quartermaine; Albert Hornsby; Evelyn Hornsby
- Uncles: Bradley Ward; Alan Quartermaine; Jimmy Lee Holt
- Nephews: Leo Falconeri (adoptive)
- Nieces: Brook Lynn Ashton
- First cousins: Justus Ward; Faith Ward; Skye Chandler (adoptive); A. J. Quartermaine; Jason Morgan; Andrew Cain; Emily Quartermaine (adoptive); Austin Gatlin Holt

Dillon Quartermaine is a fictional character from General Hospital, an American soap opera on the ABC network.

Introduced in 1992, Dillon is the son of Tracy Quartermaine (Jane Elliot) and her ex-husband Paul Hornsby (Paul Satterfield). Tracy skips town with Dillon in 1993, violating her custody agreement with Paul. In 1996, Tracy and Dillon—played by P.J. Aliseo—are introduced on The City and last appeared in the series finale in 1997. In 2003, the character was re-introduced on General Hospital played by Scott Clifton. Dillon develops a romance with Georgie Jones (Lindze Letherman) whom he eventually marries. However, the relationship falls apart when Dillon has an affair with and impregnates his stepsister Lulu Spencer (Julie Marie Berman). Clifton vacated the role in 2007 and Dillon was written out of the series making brief returns last appearing for Georgie's funeral in 2007. The actor earned three consecutive Daytime Emmy Award nominations for Outstanding Younger Actor in 2004, 2005 and 2006.

In 2015, Robert Palmer Watkins joined the cast as a recast Dillon Quartermaine. He is an actor and musician committed to the work. Dillon Quartermaine left "General Hospital" in 2017 after a stint as a filmmaker, and his character's storyline involved a complicated romantic past with Lulu Spencer and a brief relationship with Kiki Jerome.

== Development ==
=== Casting ===
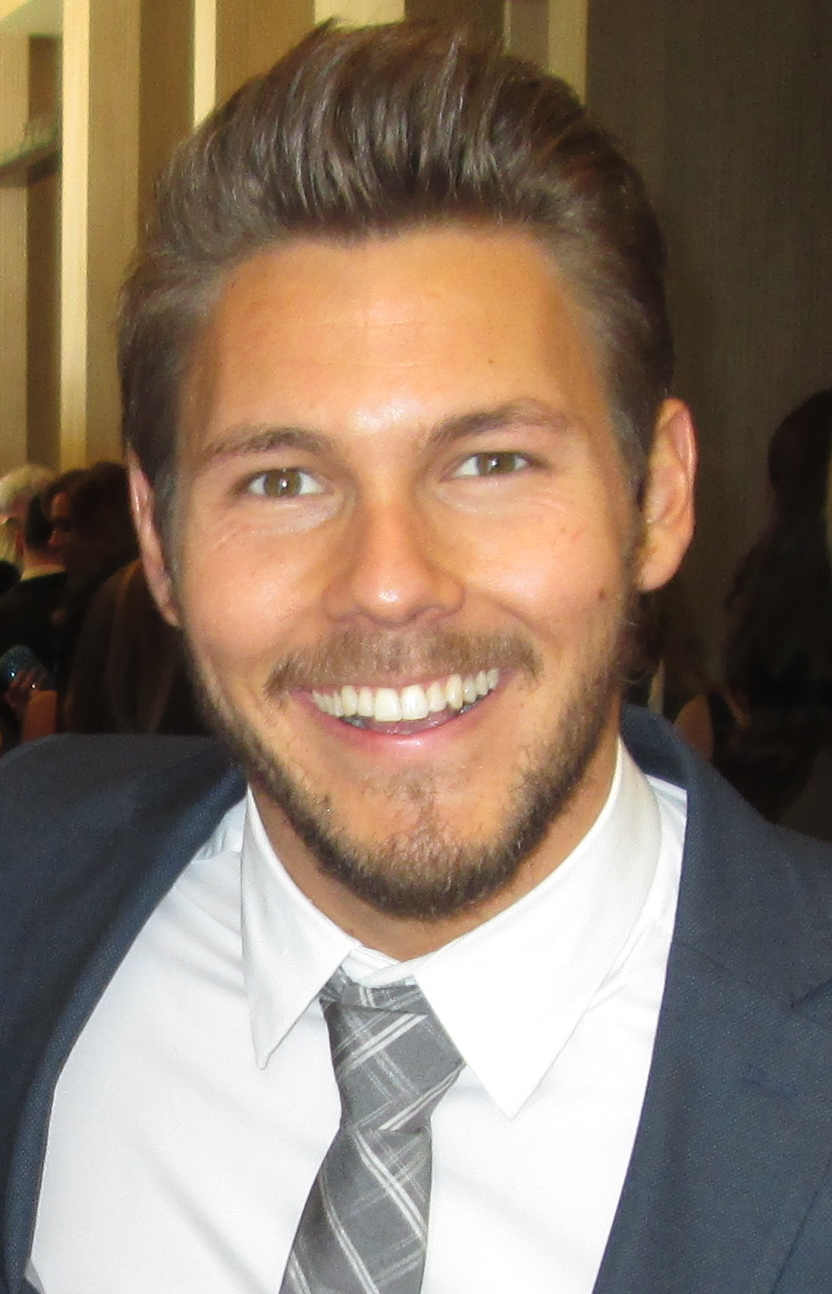
Actor Scott Clifton portrayed the role of Dillon for four years, departing the series in 2007.

The role of Dillon was originated by Kevin and Michael Jacobson in May 1992. The Jacobs twins vacated the role in the summer of 1993. In July 1996, Jacob Smith appeared in the role of Dillon. Smith last appeared on General Hospital in October 1996. In 1996, Jane Elliot joined the cast of The City in the role of Tracy Quartermaine. P.J. Aliseo made his debut on The City in the role of Dillon on October 15, 1996 as a recurring cast member. Aliseo remained with the series until its cancellation and final episodes in March 1997.

In April 2003, Scott Clifton made his debut in the role of Dillon. After four years with the series, it was announced that Clifton had chosen not to renew his contract. Clifton would reprise the role for a total of six episodes which aired from November to December 2007. While Clifton vacated the role to focus on his music career, he remained open to sporadic appearances but was not interested in returning full-time.

When Clifton was released from his contract at One Life to Live in 2010, he told fans that he was definitely open to returning to General Hospital if the show offered. However, Clifton joined the cast of The Bold and the Beautiful shortly after. Having found success on B&B, Clifton rejected the possibility of reprising the role of Dillon in a 2011 interview. "If I were fired and needed work, yes, I would come back to GH if they wanted me. But I don’t feel any desire to return to GH because I feel proud of what I was able to do over there at that point in my career. At this point, it would be hard and confusing for me to reprise Dillon at this stage." He continued, "I think GH is a great show to work on but I prefer B&B, which may be selfish."

Following the 2011 cancellations of All My Children and One Life to Live, rumors circulated that several actors from the soaps would join the cast of General Hospital. John-Paul Lavoisier—formerly Rex Balsom on One Life—was said to be up for the role of Dillon Quartermaine. Critics and viewers recognized the similarities in Lavoisier and Clifton's acting styles when they appeared opposite one another on One Life to Live. Despite the persistent rumors, in January 2014, Lavoisier denied ever being contacted about recasting the role.

On May 29, 2015, Soap Opera Digest announced that Robert Palmer Watkins had been cast in the role of Dillon. Of his casting, Watkins said "I love the character and I am so excited to be a part of the show." Watkins had previously auditioned for casting director Mark Teschner upon graduating from The American Musical and Dramatic Academy several years before landing the role of Dillon. Watkins later revealed that he auditioned for the role Morgan Corinthos in 2013 but he didn't fit the role. Watkins auditioned for the series once again in 2014. "It went really well" Watkins said. Teschner told Watkins they would call him back in. Watkins was left disappointed when he didn't hear anything. The series contacted him again a year later but Watkins said "I didn't want to get too excited" because he thought the casting might be put on hold again. Watkins was soon called into meet the producers and learned he had booked the role of Dillon. Watkins said getting the news "was probably the most exciting news of my career thus far. I'm still in shock, honestly" Watkins exclaimed. He continued, "I can relate a lot to Dillon; I feel like this role was meant for me. It feels right." Watkins said he was initially a bit "naive" about the importance of the role. "I feel like I've hit the jackpot and I'm just overwhelmed and grateful" the actor continued. On August 17, 2017, Daytime Confidential exclusively announced that Watkins had been let go from the serial. In November 2017, Soaps.com announced that Palmer Watkins would remain on the soap in a recurring capacity.

=== Characterization ===
In 2009, Clifton described Dillon as "unguarded" and kind of "looser cannon" when compared to his One Life to Live character, Schuyler Joplin. In a 2010 interview with On-Air On-Soaps, Clifton described Dillon as "this weird, quirky, punk kid with rocker hair and chain length metal bracelets." Clifton later explained that he often patterned new characters after some of his peers. He patterned Dillon after one of his friends, another friend who was gay, and then another person with a bit of his own personality injected. Upon his debut, Robert Palmer Watkins explained that "When I first come in, I have some pretty intense scenes, but then his playfulness and personality really start to come out." Watkins described Dillon as having a "very strong stance on things" and he is "very confident." However, his confidence can be seen being a "little cocky" sometimes. Dillon is "very lovable" and a "good guy." Watkins continued, "I think Dillon is very witty, very sharp and very humorous." Watkins later revealed that he was encouraged to infuse humor into the character and his lines. Dillon is "not just heroic and serious all the time."

=== Teen years (2003–07) ===
In 2003, it was announced that Jane Elliot would reprise the role of Tracy Quartermaine in April 2003. The series released as a casting call for the teenage Dillon as well. However, Tracy's brief return was only to facilitate the introduction of the teenage Dillon, played by Scott Clifton. The writers developed a romance between Dillon and Georgie Jones (Lindze Letherman) which Jamey Giddens from Daytime Confidential described as "saccharine-sweet." The romance is plagued by parental interference and Dillon's own infidelities such as his one-night-stand with Sage Alcazar (Katie Stuart) and his affair with his stepsister Lulu Spencer (Julie Marie Berman) which culminates in a pregnancy. The character also develops a comedic dynamic with his then stepfather Luke Spencer (Anthony Geary). Dillon shows an interest in film making and idolizes Steven Spielberg. In May 2007, it was announced that Scott Clifton had chosen not to renew his contract and would soon vacate the role of Dillon. Though it was initially speculated that Dillon would be written out of the series in June, but Clifton would appear on a recurring basis until the character could be written out properly. A representative said "Scott will not be leaving in June, but will exit the show as needed per storyline." Clifton made his final appearance as a series regular on July 9, 2007. Dillon would leave town to chase his dream of becoming a filmmaker after failing to win Lulu's affections.

== Storylines ==
=== 1992–97 ===
Attorney Paul Hornsby (Paul Satterfield) makes plans to leave his unhappy marriage to Tracy Quartermaine (Jane Elliot) so he can be with Jenny Eckert (Cheryl Richardson). However, once Tracy announces her pregnancy, Paul decides to stay in the marriage for his child. Tracy gives birth to Paul's son, Dillon Albert Quartermaine Hornsby in 1992. He is named after Paul's father Albert Hornsby and Tracy's favorite poet, Dylan Thomas. By the time of Dillon's birth, the marriage is even more unstable. After discovering Tracy has been blackmailing Jenny about her past destroying Jenny's marriage to Tracy's son Ned Ashton (Wally Kurth), Paul walks out on her. When Tracy runs Jenny over with her car, her father Edward (David Lewis) banishes her from his life. Upon her departure, Tracy takes Dillon with her violating the terms the custody agreement with Paul. Tracy and Dillon (Jacob Smith) return to Port Charles in the summer 1996 when she tries to orchestrate a hostile takeover of the family company, ELQ. Edward (John Ingle) threatens to inform Paul of Tracy's whereabouts so he can take Dillon away but Tracy reveals that she handled the custody situation and Paul can see Dillon when he wishes. However, after her plan fails, Edward banishes her once again. From October to March 1996, Dillon (P.J. Aliseo) resided with Tracy in SoHo New York when the characters appeared on The City. Dillon's childhood is far from normal. He spends most of his early years moving from place to place with Tracy because of her strained relationship with the Quartermaine family. Dillon becomes her mischievous travelling companion.

=== 2003–07 ===
In 2003, Tracy leaves Dillon with his grandparents Edward and Lila (Anna Lee) and leaves town. Dillon charms Georgie Jones (Lindze Letherman) and they soon start dating much to the dismay of his mother and Georgie's stepfather Mac Scorpio (John J. York). To make matters worse, Dillon starts working for mobster Lorenzo Alcazar (Ted King) as an errand boy. Wanting to keep him safe, Georgie teams up with Tracy to get Dillon away from Alcazar. However, Tracy only agrees to force Dillon to quit after Georgie dumps him. Heart broken, Dillon finds comfort with Alcazar's niece Sage (Katie Stuart) and he loses his virginity to her. However, Georgie witnesses their tryst. Georgie and Dillon later reconcile and eventually consummated their relationship. In February 2006, when the town is infected by a deadly virus outbreak, Dillon believes he is dying and wants to marry Georgie—their parents reluctantly agree and the duo marries on February 14, 2006. Dillon recovers but Tracy refusing to accept the marriage cuts Dillon off financially. Dillon and Georgie move into a room above Kelly's diner next door from Diego Alcazar (Ignacio Serricchio). Dillon later catches the eye of his new stepsister Lulu Spencer (Julie Marie Berman) and she sets out to break up his marriage. When Lulu falsely leads Dillon to believe Georgie is having an affair with Diego, he sleeps with Lulu. Dillon is devastated to learn Lulu lied and he and Georgie divorce in the summer of 2006. As Dillon and Georgie try to reconcile, Lulu discovers she is pregnant. Knowing she and Dillon are not ready to be parents Lulu gets an abortion and Dillon grudgingly accepts her decision. Dillon eventually realizes he has feelings for Lulu and battles Damian Spinelli (Bradford Anderson), Milo Giambetti (Drew Cheetwood), and Logan Hayes (Josh Duhon) for her affections. In 2007, Ned reveals that he has arranged for Dillon to assist his favorite director during a movie shoot in Hollywood. However, Dillon hesitates to accept apprenticeship because he doesn't want to abandon Tracy or Lulu. However, when Lulu starts dating Logan, he accepts the offer and moves to California.

Dillon returns in November 2007 for his cousin Emily (Natalia Livingston)'s funeral. Dillon returns a month later hoping to visit Georgie and he wants her to come back to California with him. Dillon is devastated to learn that Georgie—like Emily—has also been murdered by the Text Message Killer. Dillon then returns to California.

=== 2015– ===
Having been made aware of Luke's recent behavior thanks to Ned, Dillon returns to Port Charles to check up on Tracy and reluctantly gives his support to Tracy and Luke's most recent engagement. Dillon also reconnects with Lulu (Emme Rylan) and meets her husband Dante Falconeri (Dominic Zamprogna). Dillon and Lulu also both travel to Canada to help her parents Luke and Laura (Anthony Geary and Genie Francis) and Holly Sutton (Emma Samms) rescue Lulu's brothers Lucky Spencer (Jonathan Jackson) and Ethan Lovett (Nathan Parsons), after they were both kidnapped by mobster and Luke's old enemy Frank Smith (Joseph Cortese).

== Reception ==
Scott Clifton's Dillon was very well received by fans and critics alike becoming a fan favorite. His romance with Georgie became quite popular with fans as well and their popularity even overcame Dillon's infidelities. Clifton was nominated for the Daytime Emmy Award for Outstanding Younger Actor in a Drama Series three times in 2004, 2005, and 2006. "In the much-anticipated, hopeful returned focus to the yuppie set of Port Charlesians as we enter summer, GH has a mad a move" SoapView said of the recast. Michael Fairman of On-Air On-Soaps said Watkins provides the character with "some major sex appeal." "Talk about an entrance and quite the initiation!" Fairman said of Watkins' "highly anticipated" debut scenes. Fairman continued, "it seems Watkins has a very bright future on the soap scene with his charm, good looks, and ease of delivery" opposite veterans.
