= Tracy Quartermaine =

- General Hospital character
- Jane Elliot as Tracy Quartermaine
- Portrayed by: Jane Elliot (1978–present); Christine Jones (1989); Allison Miller (2006)
- Duration: 1978–1980; 1989–1993; 1996–1997; 2003–2017; 2019–present
- First appearance: June 19, 1978
- Created by: Douglas Marland
- Introduced by: Gloria Monty (1978); H. Wesley Kenney (1989); Wendy Riche (1996); Jean Dadario Burke (1996); Jill Farren Phelps (2003); Frank Valentini (2019)
- Book appearances: The Secret Life of Damian Spinelli
- Crossover appearances: The City
In-universe information
- Other names: Tracy Angelica Quartermaine; Tracy Ashton; Tracy Williams; Tracy Hornsby; Tracy Soleito; Tracy Spencer; Tracy Zacchara
- Occupation: Businesswoman; Casino owner Philanthropist; Mob boss
- Family: Quartermaine
- Parents: Edward Quartermaine; Lila Quartermaine
- Brothers: Alan Quartermaine
- Half-brothers: Bradley Ward; Jimmy Lee Holt
- Husband: Larry Ashton (1968–1977); Mitch Williams (1979–8?) (Note: It is not known exactly when Tracy and Mitch divorce, only that it happened before 1989.); Paul Hornsby (1991–1994); Gino Soleito (1997); Luke Spencer (2005–2006, 2010-2011, 2014) (Note: Luke and Tracy's first wedding in May 2005 was invalid. This was not revealed until June 2010. Luke and Tracy legally married in December 2010 and divorced in 2011. They remarried once again in 2014, this marriage was later annulled when Tracy thought she had married Cesar Faison.); Anthony Zacchara (2012)
- Sons: Ned Quartermaine; Dillon Quartermaine
- Grandsons: Leo Falconeri (adoptive)
- Granddaughters: Brook Lynn Ashton
- Grandparents: George Quartermaine; Harold Morgan; Ida Zemlock
- Uncles: Hal Morgan
- Nieces and nephews: Justus Ward; A. J. Quartermaine; Jason Morgan; Andrew Cain; Austin Gatlin-Holt; Faith Ward; Skye Chandler (adoptive); Emily Quartermaine (adoptive)
- First cousins: Alexandria Quartermaine
- Other relatives: Gio Palmieri; Michael Corinthos

Tracy Quartermaine is a fictional character on the ABC soap opera General Hospital. She is played by actress Jane Elliot, who originated the role in 1978 and has played her intermittently since that time, primarily on GH and briefly on The City from 1996 to 1997. In 1980, Elliot won the Daytime Emmy for outstanding supporting actress and was nominated again in 1993. Briefly in 1989, while Jane Elliot was on maternal leave, Christine Jones took on the role. Tracy Quartermaine is currently the show's fifth longest-serving character after Dr. Monica Quartermaine, Luke Spencer, Laura Spencer, and Scott Baldwin.

Tracy is the spoiled, rich, and often badly behaved daughter of the wealthy Edward Quartermaine and Lila Morgan Quartermaine. She has two sons, Ned Quartermaine (also known as Ned Ashton) and Dillon Quartermaine; two stepsons, Lucky Spencer and Ethan Lovett; and a stepdaughter, Lulu Spencer. Many of her storylines over the course of 30 years involved feuds with her sister-in-law, Dr. Monica Quartermaine, Tracy's unsuccessful attempts to find love, her determination to gain power in ELQ, the family company, and her attempts to one-up family members who have tried to displace her or her sons in ELQ or in her father's affections.

Tracy was originally presented as a vivacious socialite who hid her scheming nature, but her brother and parents saw through that and warned her sister-in-law Monica. Although friendly on the outside, Tracy could be snobbish on a whim, although that became more apparent when she was older rather than during her early days in Port Charles. While Tracy wanted to get in good with her father, Edward, he still deemed his son Alan Quartermaine, Tracy's brother, his favorite. In recent years, Tracy has greatly mellowed, showing her maternal side with her sons Ned and Dillon, as well as stepdaughter Lulu, supporting her sister-in-law Monica through various ordeals, and befriending female characters after never really having had women friendships while younger.

== Casting ==
The role of Tracy Quartermaine was originated by actress Jane Elliot in June 1978. After two years with the series, Eliot left the role in June 1980. The actress later reflected on the decision to leave, citing an insult from executive producer Gloria Monty over a salary dispute as the reason for her departure. In December 1988, after months of rumors, it was announced that Elliot would reprise the role of Tracy. She returned on March 17, 1989. Later that year, Elliot went on maternity leave, and veteran soap opera actress, Christine Jones assumed the role of Tracy that November. Jones portrayed the role for about a month, before Elliot's return. Elliot left the series once again in 1993, last appearing on June 16. She briefly returned to the series from July 26 to October 7, 1996. Later in 1996, it was announced that Elliot would bring the role of Tracy to fellow ABC soap opera, The City. Elliot debuted on the October 7, 1996, episode of The City. The decision was an attempt to garner interest in the series, after the departure of lead actress Morgan Fairchild. Elliot remarked, "It was all the network's idea. Morgan was leaving and it was a very big loss for the show. It was already in the works that I was returning to General Hospital for a while". The City was canceled in 1997, to make room for the General Hospital spin-off, Port Charles. Elliot remained with the series through its finale on March 28, 1997.

In 2003, it was announced that Elliot would once again be reprising the role on General Hospital. She returned on April 15, 2003. In March 2017, Daytime Confidential and other media outlets broke reports that Elliot would be leaving General Hospital at the end of her current deal with the serial; she last appeared on May 4, 2017. In November 2019, Entertainment Weekly reported that Elliot will be returning to the show. She appeared from December 23, 2019, to February 4 of the following year. In November 2020, it was announced Elliot would again reprise the role, she returned from November 30 to January 29, 2021. Elliot then made a surprise return on January 3, 2022. She departed again on February 2 of that year.

On January 11, 2023, at ABC's Television Critics Association panel, it was announced Elliot would return for the soap's 60th anniversary. Soap Opera Digest reported Elliot's return would be a "long-term stay". She was set to make her return during the April 17, 2023, episode; however, due to a preemption, her return date was pushed back to April 18.

== Storylines ==
=== Backstory ===
Tracy Angelica Quartermaine is born on Southampton, New York on April 6, 1949, (Note: Alan was born in 1948) as the youngest child of Edward and Lila Quartermaine. Tracy was introduced onscreen in 1978, as a divorcée and neglectful mother. Backstory established that she had married young to Lord Lawrence "Larry" Ashton and had a son, Ned Ashton. When she divorced Larry Ashton, her son Ned spent a great deal of time with his grandparents or at boarding school while his mother focused on travel or her social life. In addition to Lord Ashton, it was mentioned that she had been married three other times, although Larry was the only one ever seen on screen.

=== 1978–1980 ===
Tracy arrived in Port Charles in 1978 as the scheming daughter of Edward and Lila Quartermaine for Alan and Monica's wedding. A divorcee with a young son, Ned (off in boarding school), Tracy felt Monica was beneath them although she did grow to respect Monica as a physician. Determined to always be the center of attention at social functions, Tracy flirted with many of the men she met, although most of them were already involved in other relationships. Edward and Lila shed light on their daughter's character to Monica at a Thanksgiving gathering, warning her that Tracy would be ruthless in her attempts to hold onto her grandfather's trust fund for her son. Despite often friendly encounters with Monica, Tracy was determined to prevent any male children of Monica's from getting their hands on the trust fund. This was fueled by her discovery that Monica was having an affair with Monica's first love, Rick Webber. Her mission was to determine that Monica's unborn child was indeed not a Quartermaine heir, but rather a Webber heir. This was a problem as both Monica and Rick were married to other people at the time, Monica to Alan, and Rick to Lesley Williams. When Monica was injured falling down the stairs in the Quartermaine mansion and had to spend the remainder of her pregnancy in bed, Tracy visited her with a peace offering, and told her that she was praying for Monica's unborn child, which she hoped was a girl. But when tests proved otherwise, Tracy's schemes went into high gear, although she was concerned about Monica and the soon to be born baby when Monica was trapped at the mansion during a snowstorm with only Lesley Webber, Gail Baldwin and the Quartermaine housekeeper, Stella Fields, to aide her during labor. But once this crisis was over and Monica returned home, Tracy's schemes to prove that Rick was the father became more aggressive, causing the rivalry between the two women to explode into war.

Tracy had flirtations with Rick Webber and Gary Lansing, but his wife Gina prevented them from getting further involved. Tracy's personal life had taken a hopeful turn when she fell in love with D.A. Mitch Williams, the ambitious politician who had prosecuted Lesley for murder. Little did Tracy know that Mitch was in love with waitress Susan Moore and was only using her for money and position in his attempts to win the state senate race. Mitch's attempts to gather votes by promising to bring down the local mob lead to an assassination attempt on his life, and in November 1979, he was shot at during the middle of his victory party as Tracy watched in horror. His arm was only grazed, but assassin Roy DiLucca was killed. Tracy, who hoped to marry Mitch the next day, went to his suite, and found him in bed with Susan. Refusing to give in to her pride, Tracy ordered Susan out and married Mitch anyway, humiliated in knowing that he loved another woman and was only using her. Even though Edward distrusted Mitch, he had put money up for Mitch's campaign. In 1980, Edward, tried to test her loyalty by pretending to have a heart attack. When Tracy failed to give her father his heart medication, he disowned her, and she was banished from the Quartermaines. During their marriage, Mitch continued his affair with Susan who would later have an affair with Tracy's brother, Alan. Tracy uses her financial influence with Mitch to get him to end the affair and they relocate to Albany in June 1980 where she presumably lived comfortably but unhappily as a senator's wife. However, the marriage quickly falls apart and Tracy divorces Mitch and goes off to Europe.

=== 1989–1993 ===
Tracy returned to Port Charles in 1989, just a year after her son, Ned Ashton, arrived. Prior to her arrival, her first husband Lord Lawrence Ashton was introduced to the scene with his new wife, a much younger woman named Arielle. Tracy, polite but cool towards Ned's girlfriend, Dawn Winthrop, investigated her and discovered that she was really Monica's illegitimate daughter which made her instantly disapprove. She informed Lawrence upon her return that she had discovered that his late parents had not legally been married, and that there was another heir to the Ashton fortune out there, which she intended to keep secret in order to maintain Ned's inheritance from his paternal grandfather. But when Quartermaine mechanic Charlie Prince was discovered to be the missing heir, Lawrence lost everything, and he began to woo Tracy in order to get his hands on some Quartermaine cash. Tracy's other major concern was the impending romance between her brother Alan and his friend Lucy Coe, who became an instant enemy of Tracy's. At the same time that Alan was having an affair with Lucy, Alan's wife Monica was having an affair with Tracy's son Ned. Later that year, Tracy and the rest of the Quartermaines faced tragedy when Edward Quartermaine's jet crashed on a desert island. Everyone grieved including Lila and Tracy, who was determined to find out what had happened to her father. Tracy nearly lost ELQ's fortune when she became involved with the supposedly wealthy and powerful Nicholas Van Buren, who was really an international criminal known as Domino. Immediately after this, Tracy was accused of the murder of David McAllister who was actually killed by his own assistant, Jimmy O'Herlihy. Scott Baldwin was her attorney and later became her romantic flame. They were interrupted during a tryst by a visiting Lee and Gail who were more than stunned by Scotty's involvement with Tracy. At the same time that all of this was happening, both Alan and Tracy were fighting for ownership of ELQ, the family company. As a result of her actions, Alan blackmailed Tracy into resigning from the family company.

In the early 1990s, Tracy and Larry tried to get rid of her sister-in-law, Lucy Coe, whom Tracy disapproved of even more than Monica. It was later revealed by Larry that Lucy was pregnant with the child of Scotty Baldwin, not Alan, and rather than repeat what had happened years ago with Monica, Alan divorced Lucy, although she would remain friends with him and even establish a pleasant acquaintance with both Tracy and Monica, whom Tracy now approved of, and encouraged Alan to remarry. Tracy kicked Larry Ashton out after realizing that he was no good, and he left town permanently. Later on, Tracy became entranced with Paul Hornsby, a young man who was infatuated with Jenny Eckert, a distant cousin of Luke Spencer. Paul, involved with shady characters determined to get their hands on ELQ was forced into marrying Tracy, and Jenny began to date Ned. Tracy found Jenny to be a threat to her happiness with Paul, so she encouraged Ned and Jenny even though she couldn't stand her. She decided to dig up some information on her to keep her away from Paul, and discovered that Jenny, who had claimed to be a virgin, had an abortion when she was only a teenager. However, Paul found out what had been going on and decided to leave Tracy with their newborn son, Dillon Hornsby to marry Jenny whose marriage to Ned was unsuccessful. In a moment of rage, Tracy ran over Jenny with her car, and fled the scene of the accident. Later, Jenny remembered seeing Tracy behind the wheel and blackmailed her into getting a divorce from Paul and sharing custody of Dillon with Paul. Tracy fulfilled most of the terms, but in the end, Edward disowned her once again, and even compassionate words from Lila couldn't change his mind. Distraught over being banished yet again, Tracy was grateful when Monica provided her with emotional support as she prepared to leave town. Tracy was supposed to give Paul joint custody of Dillon, but because she did not like Jenny and what she did to Ned, she took Dillon with her to Europe.

=== 1996–1997 ===
Tracy returned to Port Charles in 1996, with hopes of taking over the company from her son, Ned. At the time, Ned was leading a double life, one as a son and financier at ELQ, and another as a rock star, known as "Eddie Maine". However, Tracy soon fell out of favor with the family again. It was during this brief visit that Tracy encountered Luke Spencer at Kelly's while Ned was performing. After Edward kicked her out once again, she blackmailed her old acquaintance Sydney Chase (Morgan Fairchild) into selling her the building located at 212 Greene Street, in the SoHo section of New York City, and joined the series The City. Living briefly with Dillon in the building's penthouse, she became involved with ailing mafioso boss, Gino Soleito and in December 1996, Gino gets her to agree to marriage. Tracy immediately clashes with Gino's daughter, Carla who believes she is after Gino's money. Gino and Tracy wed in late February 1997 and on the wedding night she pretends to be sick to avoid consummating the marriage. In early March, Tracy hires a prostitute to pretend to be her when Gino wants to consummate the marriage and he dies. Tracy became—in her words—the crime family's new "godmother". Her new status served as the inspiration for a twisted joke on Thanksgiving Day 1997, when she sent a group of her henchmen to Port Charles to rob her family at gunpoint and pretend to threaten their lives. In the course of the "joke," the prepared food was ruined, continuing a long-running streak of ruined Quartermaine Thanksgiving dinners that resulted in the family ordering take-out pizza.

=== 2003–2006 ===
In 2003, Tracy returned to Port Charles. This time, she came with her son Dillon (now a teenager and using the surname Quartermaine). The first time he met the family, it was apparent to Dillon that they did not approve of him simply because he was Tracy's son. Tracy later blackmailed Skye for $5 Million when she told her about her true parentage. Tracy told Skye how Edward sold her on the Black Market right after she was born. Skye refused to give into her blackmail and ultimately revealed all to the Quartermaines and Tracy's part in it. The entire family got angry with Tracy, and Lila kicked Tracy out of the mansion. When Tracy left town, she left Dillon behind with Edward and Lila.

Tracy returned to Port Charles in 2004, after Dillon was arrested. Since no one else was willing to bail him out of jail, his friend Sage Alcazar decided to call Tracy. By this time, the bond that Tracy and Dillon once shared began to tear and Dillon began to find out the exact kind of person that his mother really was. Also, in 2004, Tracy was devastated by the death of her elderly mother, Lila Quartermaine. Tracy lashed out on the entire family once again before having a heart-to-heart with big brother Alan. Tracy also delivered a kind and caring eulogy at her mother's funeral. At the same time, Tracy begins scheming with the help of Jasper Jacks to take over control of ELQ from Ned. This included proving that Ned was corrupt and that Edward was not of sound mind. Edward, with the help of Luke Spencer and Skye Quartermaine, eluded Tracy and Alan's plots to "take care of Daddy".

Tracy fell victim to a cruel prank at the hand of her son, Dillon Quartermaine, and his girlfriend, Georgie Jones, for Luke Spencer. The plan was to get roughly $15 million he planted in her bank account to bail Helena Cassadine out of extradition. Since Tracy did not want to give him the money, Luke decided to pull the ultimate prank on her. He would have Dillon call Tracy from Las Vegas and tell her that he and Georgie eloped. Knowing this would get Tracy to Vegas, Luke used this as an opportunity to manipulate Tracy's weakness: alcohol. Once Tracy arrived in Vegas, it was too late - Dillon and Georgie were married. This drove Tracy into a drunken fit. Luke offered to buy her a few more drinks and they both proceeded to get more drunk. Since Tracy drank more than Luke did, she was completely incapacitated when Luke proposed marriage and she accepted. The following morning, when she woke up, Luke revealed everything to Tracy and the conditions to ending their marriage from hell. At first her marriage to Luke was platonic, and it continued because of finances, but she had to fight romantic feelings for Luke, who continued to be devoted to his former wife and great love, Laura Spencer, who briefly came out of a catatonic state in late 2006. Tracy had to deal with her son Dillon's entanglement with his stepsister Lulu Spencer. She advised Lulu against having an abortion when she became pregnant by Dillon, feeling Lulu would eventually regret her decision. Tracy revealed to Lulu that she had had an abortion after a brief relationship with a man she was involved after her marriage to Larry Ashton ended. Tracy was supportive when Lulu did abort the baby and was relieved for Dillon's sake that he would not become a father so young. Tracy began to be haunted by a recently deceased Alan, who served as her moral compass, as she doesn't have much of a conscience. As Tracy began to be more supportive of Dillon and Lulu, the ghost of Alan decided it was time for him to move on.

=== 2007–2008 ===
In 2007, Luke and Tracy's marriage has moved more away from platonic and closer to love. Her son, Dillon, and Lulu Spencer find evidence to suggest that Laura did not kill Rick Webber, but Scott Baldwin in fact did. Tracy and Dillon agreed to keep the evidence of the revelation from Luke Spencer, as it will destroy Luke that he caused Laura's physical breakdown. Tracy has also come to care about Lulu. Edward is up to no good and sends Tracy to a mental hospital after she talks to Alan in front of Lainey and also she found out that her only ally was Lulu. Tracy discovered that Lulu's friend, Logan Hayes, was the son of Luke's enemy, Scott Baldwin. She forbade Lulu to see him, but Lulu didn't listen to Tracy's advice. When Tracy decides to crush the family company, her father has no choice but to let Tracy out of the mental house and she is the only person who can get through to her stepdaughter, Lulu Spencer. With Tracy out of Shadybrooke, she could now focus on ruining Lulu's relationship with Logan. The first step was to get Scott Baldwin to admit that Hayes is his son. After receiving iron-clad proof that the two were related, Scott tried to get back into Logan's good graces. As it failed and Tracy was determined to get Luke back home, she offered Logan money to play nice with his father and regain good spirits with Lulu after using her to make Maxie Jones look good. Hayes rejected the offer and suggested to Tracy that Lulu would go back to him when she realized how real their connection was but both were unaware that Lulu already agreed to Scott that she would give Logan a second chance. Upon realizing this, Tracy slapped Scott and resented him more for manipulating Lulu back into Logan's arms. This indicated that Tracy genuinely cared for Lulu's well-being. At the same time, Luke returned in October. Tracy revealed to Luke what happened with his daughter and Scott's son. Lulu at the same time got mixed up with Jason Morgan and Johnny Zacchara. Now, Luke and Tracy were teamed up to protect Lulu and her safety. Tracy has offered her to come back, but she declined. Luke had asked for Tracy's assistance in the matter, and she accepted, despite Ghost Alan warning her against interfering with Luke's events. Though Alan continued to haunt his sister, he still continued to serve as her conscience and sole guardian. A few days before Halloween 2007, the Spencers received an invitation from Nikolas Cassadine to attend a fancy dress Black and White Ball in Alan's honor. While both Tracy and Luke sneered at the thoughts of that function, Tracy reminded him that if they wanted to gain leverage on Baldwin and Hayes, and keep an eye on Logan and Lulu, it would be a good idea to attend. At the function, she came late and did not actually appear at Wyndemere Castle. It was, however, implied that Tracy was expected to be late, by Luke's admission. When she finally arrived at Wyndemere Castle, she was isolated by the burgeoning storm and she stood on the deck by herself for 90 minutes before getting up to Wyndemere. Alfred, the Cassadine family butler, mistakenly scared Tracy, allowing her to lose her balance and fall down an entire flight of stairs. Luke kissed her, thankful that she was alive and did not fall victim to Anthony Zacchara. He, Scott Baldwin, and Cooper Barrett rescued her from the collapse, while Tracy and Luke and Scott barricaded themselves in the master bedroom, where Luke vowed to "nurse her back to health". When Tracy offered for Luke to go search for Zacchara, he told her that he did not want her to be his next victim.

In 2008, Tracy filed a malpractice suit for her out-of-town again husband, Luke. The lawsuit was filed against her sister-in-law Monica, which resulted in a hospital brawl in the General Hospital elevator. Tracy told Monica not to operate on Luke because of her emotional strain against the deaths of Alan and Emily; however, she did anyway, and froze on the operating table. Since Tracy filed the medical malpractice suit, she has been kicked out of the family's mansion with frozen access to the family money. When Luke did return, she explained to him that she still loved him, but was not going to continue to be married to him. Luke told her that he was not going to give up on their marriage so easily. Later on, she and Luke left town because Luke was being investigated by his connections with the Zacchara family, which invested in his Haunted Star Casino. The mob family left him to take the fall with the I.R.S. because he stole money from them. Afraid of what he would be up to, she agreed to leave with him. Tracy returned without Luke because he was not spending the money and enjoying their time the way that she wanted him to. At this time, Monica was in rehab after being indicted in court for hit and run. Tracy visited Monica and learned that she was doing fine and was ready to return to work in a few weeks, which pleased Tracy. Tracy visited Monica in rehab and asked for advice about how to save Lulu's life. Monica told Tracy that if she could turn back the clock, she would do everything to save all of her children, especially Jason. With that, she told Tracy that if she wanted to save Lulu's life, then she had to do everything in her power to drive a wedge between Lulu and Johnny. After that, she visited Johnny in his holding cell where she told him about her brush with the mafia. She explained to him that she was once a mob boss and she heard about how his father Anthony Zacchara murdered his wife: Johnny's mother. She told him that if he really cared about Lulu, he would let her go. In October 2008, when Lulu was in her darkest hour, Tracy had one of her 'men' track down Luke. He turned up in Mexico, so Tracy headed there, but not before blackmailing Edward into getting the money laundering charges dropped. Once she was satisfied, she flew to Mexico and found Luke in a bar. They were both briefly put in jail, after a run-in with the local cops. In November, it was announced that Laura had awoken from her coma. There was a question of whether or not Luke would stay married to Tracy or go back to Laura, the love of his life. On November 20, Tracy filed for a divorce, but Luke tried to tell her he loved only her. With a new dawning beginning as Luke proclaimed his love for Tracy, being unconvinced and stubborn, Tracy shut Luke out lying to him and making him believed they were already divorced. However, the obvious love between the two lead to many ploys by Luke to win the new love of his life back. This happened on New Year's Eve when Luke planned a surprise party for Tracy. Tracy thought that it was a stupid gesture and a waste of her time and money. They played roulette, Tracy asked Luke what Laura's Birthday was. He replied December 21. Tracy then said that if the ball landed on 21 Luke will leave the country and give her a divorce but if it landed on 6 (Tracy's Birthday) she had to take him back. The ball landed on 6 and they bring in the new year with a passionate kiss.

=== 2009–2017 ===
In early 2009, Tracy then bailed Luke and his new friend Ethan Lovett out of jail. Tracy fixed the results of a DNA test to show that Luke was not Ethan's biological father, after Helena Cassadine pointed out how much alike the two were, but Tracy did not know the true outcome. It was later determined that Ethan was, in fact, Luke's son and Tracy's stepson. Tracy struggled with Luke's affections for Ethan's biological mother Holly Sutton who eventually left town again. Luke took off for the summer, and Tracy did not go after him. When he returned they began to get closer. Luke, Ethan and Lulu spent Thanksgiving with the Quartermaine's, and Tracy spent Christmas Eve with the Spencers. In 2010, Tracy has been there for Luke in the problems his children have been having. She has tried to protect Ethan from working with Johnny, and his problems with Kristina Davis. She bailed him out after he was arrested. When Tracy becomes suspicious of Elizabeth baby's paternity Helena has her kidnapped. Luke comes to rescue and they are both held captive in Greece in Helena's dungeon. Tracy becomes deathly ill and Helena refuses to give her medical attention. Luke comes up with a story claiming that their marriage isn't really legal and Tracy is angry enough to regain her strength. Luke reveals that the story was fake and they are legally married, but she doesn't believe him. It remains unclear if the marriage is legitimate or not. Tracy is furious with Luke, and wants him out of her life. Luke tries several times to win her back, but when all else fails he concocts a scheme where he steals millions of her money and vanishes. He hopes that this will inspire her to retain interest and seek him out. At first she refuses to locate Luke, but later Tracy admits to Lucky that she can't help but miss her "husband." She hires Lucky to find Luke. Lucky pretends to accept her offer, but instead embarks on a secret mission for Interpol in Ireland. Also in 2010, her niece Maya Ward moves into the Quartermaine mansion, and at one point Tracy exposes her granddaughter Brook Lynn Ashton as a con artist. Upon the return of Skye Chandler in Port Charles in 2011, Skye fuels Anthony Zacchara with some background knowledge of Tracy Quartermaine, including facts that she inadvertently invested his dirty money into her family's company back during her marriage to Gino Soleito. With the newfound knowledge, Anthony begins blackmailing Tracy into a romance and eventually a marriage or else he will report her to the SEC and have them arrest her. With her back against a wall, Tracy is forced in an engagement to the mob boss, adding some embarrassment to the situation, Anthony enlists Maxie Jones' help in arranging the wedding. Claiming to first have a cold and then to be superstitious, Tracy gets Anthony to push back the wedding from Friday, January 13. Tracy later becomes jealous of Luke and Anna's bond, and warns Anna about getting involved with Luke.

Tracy's April birthday is once again forgotten by her family. Luke, however, remembers and tracks down the offspring of Tracy's childhood horse Skittles. Luke's gift of Son of Skittles delights Tracy. Tracy enlists Luke's help to get rid of Anthony. Luke arranges for Anthony to be sent off to Ecuador, and Tracy tells Anthony to meet her at the Quartermaine boat house. When Tracy arrives at the boat house, she finds Anthony's dead body. Originally she thinks Luke shot Anthony, but Luke disproves this theory, and they realized someone has framed them. When the police arrive Tracy and Luke pretend that Anthony is alive and prop up his body to make him appear to be sleeping. Heather Webber, who is infatuated with Luke, sees through this and buries the body, to protect Luke. The police question Tracy in Anthony's disappearance, but they didn't arrest her because the body was never found. In August 2012, Tracy meets Joseph, a mysterious man, and the two instantly connect. During the pathogen scare, she remains unaware of Joseph's involvement with Jerry Jacks. Joe later gives Tracy his only vial of the antidote, which would allow her to live. When Sonny exposes Joseph as Joe Scully, Jr., Sonny's old nemesis, Tracy is furious and breaks up with him. Even though she was still angry with him, Tracy removes a bullet from Joe and agrees to hide him. She later turns him in, when she finds out he lied to her once again.

Tracy's father Edward Quartermaine died on November 21, 2012, leaving Tracy devastated after realizing she is the only one left out of her family. On November 26, 2012, Diane Miller comes to read Edward's will, much to Tracy's dismay because of her involvement with Sonny, Jason, and A.J. Skye Quartermaine, Ned Ashton, Dillon Quartermaine, Monica Quartermaine, Brook Lynn Ashton, Lila Rae Alcazar, Jason Morgon, (due to his death, his wife Sam McCall inherited Jason's ELQ Stocks), Daniel Morgan, Michael Corinthos, A. J. Quartermaine, Maya Ward, and Alice will inherit ELQ stock holdings, and all of his personal values will be divided equally with his grandchildren and great-grandchildren. His money was donated to charity, leaving Tracy with nothing besides a jar of "Pickle-Lila Relish." In 2013, Tracy and her nephew A.J. Quartermaine feud over the rights to the relish and holdings in ELQ. Upset at being cut off, and unwilling to work with A. J. Tracy begins her own company which she names "TAQ". She begins to believe that the reason the relish was left to her was to restore the glory of the Quartermaine name and empire. On March 8, she hires private eye Damien Spinelli to steal the relish recipe for her. She then uses it to create a new relish which she names "Pickle-Eddie". She takes on Nikolas Cassadine as her business associate so she can use him for money to produce and promote the relish. On May 13, Nikolas schedules an appearance for the two on The Chew, but when he realizes that Elizabeth Webber is on AJ's side, he betrays Tracy and locks her in the hotel room, placing guards to keep her from appearing on what The Chew dubbed "The Clash of the Condiments". Later, someone arrives and frees Tracy in time to make it to the set where she discovers, to her horror, that the relish was tainted, making everyone who ate it ill. In June, another few wrinkles are thrown into Tracy's life, first when it is revealed that Franco, the brother of Jason Morgan is still alive. Franco worms his way into the family home, soon followed by his daughter Kiki Jerome and his former lover Ava Jerome, Kiki's mother. Once again, Tracy and AJ's war begins as they try to convince Lauren (Kiki) and then Franco himself to side with one or the other of them in the battle for ELQ. In the midst of the ELQ mess, Tracy learns that Luke is having health problems again but refuses to see a doctor to get the results of a test he had run. Tracy agrees to go with Luke and learns he is dying of poisoning.

in November 2013, Tracy rescues Luke from Cassadine island, and the two return to Port Charles, reunited. Luke claims Tracy is his soulmate. In 2014 finds Luke and Tracy together again, as a couple. in January, Luke is kidnapped from the Quartermaine boathouse, and held in Miscavige hospital. An impostor is released from Miscavige, posing as Luke Spencer, for the remainder of the year. In March, Tracy marries the impostor. Later on, it is revealed that this supposedly Luke double really is Luke. It is revealed that years before, Luke accidentally killed his mother after finding his father about to strike her. Unable to deal with this (and the fact that he also killed his father in retaliation for the beatings), Luke began to slowly snap as a result of the drugs given to him. He is put into a mental institution, and when he gets out, reunites with Tracy.

Laura shows up at the engagement party for Luke and Tracy and announces that her feelings for Luke are as strong as ever. After Luke and Laura talk privately, he announces that his engagement to Tracy is off. Secretly, Luke and Laura admit that they could never truly be together again, but because of a family crisis, they must pretend to be. It appears that Lucky has been kidnapped, and later, they learn from Holly that Ethan was kidnapped as well. This leads them to Canada where Luke is confronted by his presumably deceased enemy Frank Smith who was allegedly behind the kidnapping. Frank is killed and Luke prepares to return to Port Charles to try and reconcile with Tracy whom he still loves. Meanwhile, Dillon Quartermaine returns to Port Charles after having followed Luke and Laura, having discovered that Luke is still in love with Tracy and that his reconciliation with Laura was only to save their son. Tracy, in the meantime, prepares to go to L.A. to confront her granddaughter Brooke Lynn who gave Nikolas Cassadine her shares in ELQ. At the airport, she is stunned when she runs into her ex-husband, Paul Hornsby, who has returned to town to visit his son. In spite of her initial coldness to him over allegedly dropping Dillon out of his life, Tracy begins to warm up to him, especially after she finds out that Jenny left him for another man. She eventually enjoys some poolside drinks with Paul and they end up sleeping together, only to be walked in on by a guilty Luke who wants her back. She tells Luke he needs to move on and continue with life. Tracy then gets with Michael Quartermaine, Jason Quartermaine, (thought of as Jake Doe at the time), and Sam McCall in an attempt to get back ELQ from Nikolas. They later switch to trying to find Jake's true identity, and the plan hits a standstill until after Carly Corinthos discovers Jake is Jason and reveals it at his wedding to Elizabeth. Tracy then hires Hayden Barnes, (who discovered the truth about Jason after being an imposter of his wife and threatens to tell Jason, so Nikolas has her shot which is presumed to have erased her memory of it only to discover she was faking), as an insider to win back ELQ.

The Quartermaine family begins to increase when a little boy found on Cassadine Island turns out to be Jason's son, Little Jake, having been taken in by Helena as part of her revenge against Luke who had believed that he was Jake's grandfather. After reuniting Jake with his mother, Elizabeth, and ultimately his real grandmother, Monica, Luke promptly leaves town to find himself, literally disappearing off the Port Charles docks where Laura had once vanished from. When Jake is revealed to be Jason, Tracy offers support to Monica who was still dealing with A.J.'s death. It turns out that Jason/Jake had been brainwashed by Helena Cassadine who dies on Cassadine Island before she has the chance to reveal more information. Helena's death leaves many unanswered questions but brings much relief to all of Port Charles, including her old cohort, Tracy. Monica and Tracy team together to plan a lavish hospital fundraiser. It is on the night of this ball that Tracy finds Paul in bed with Ava Jerome (who arranged for Tracy to come over to Paul's suite) and promptly kicks him out of her life. During this time, Tracy began to suffer from major pains in her head and after being examined, was informed that she might have brain cancer. This brought out tough love from Monica who responded to Tracy's barbs with some of her own, but it was apparent that this was tough love to get Tracy to fight rather than simply give up.

Several months later, the tables would turn when it was Monica in the hospital bed, having been attacked by Paul Hornsby, revealed to the audience to be the hospital serial killer. Tracy used her snarky wit to encourage Monica to fight, but also told her unconscious sister-in-law that she needed her in her life. Tracy would have a horrifying experience when she discovered that the killer's next victim was her very good friend, Sabrina, strangled by Paul after she found him in Monica's office while Monica lay on the floor. Tracy's determination helped Monica come around, and Tracy hired bodyguards to protect the stalker from getting to Monica again. But when Tracy all of a sudden overheard a one-sided conversation that Paul had with his comatose daughter, Susan, she realized that he was the killer. Paul held her hostage and was on the verge of killing her when Anna and Dillon burst in and saved her.

Tracy left town in the spring of 2017, selling a painting her father had left to her to fund her next chapter. She told her family it was time to step out of her father's shadow and have her own life. As she leaves, she runs into Luke Spencer at a coffee shop.

In June 2017, Monica reveals to Hayden and Finn that Tracy is in Amsterdam and the two keep in touch via email. In July 2017, Tracy sent monogrammed champagne glasses and reserved a bottle of champagne for Ned and Olivia's wedding. In a letter, she wishes Ned and Olivia all the best and says the gift is for their wedding toast. In late 2019, Tracy returned to Port Charles.

== Reception ==
Elliot won the Daytime Emmy Award for Outstanding Supporting Actress in a Drama Series in 1981. She was nominated for the same award in 1993, and again in 2014.

In 2023, Charlie Mason from Soaps She Knows placed Tracy at number ten on his ranked list of "General Hospital's 40+ Greatest Characters of All Time," commenting: "[U]nlike Port Charles' myriad mobsters and madmen, Jane Elliot's undisputed queen of mean could kill with nothing more than a well-aimed insult. Mind you, she was just covering up the fact that, like anyone else, she had a heart; hers just happened to cost more." Soap Opera Digest named Elliot's return as Tracy as their "Best Return" for General Hospital, citing her return as bringing "welcome color and pizazz to the mansion." The following year, Mason and Richard Simms from Soaps She Knows called the 2023 return of Tracy the "Best Return" in American soap operas of that year, commenting that there is "absolutely nothing that General Hospital‘s Tracy can't make better. The show needs to do whatever it takes to keep Jane Elliot around for as long as she will stay".

In December 2024, as part of their year-end listings, Elliot received an honorable mention on Soap Opera Network's top female performers list. Elliot's work, opposite Francis, was named by TV Insider as their fourth best performance, in ranking their "21 Best Soap Performances of 2024". In the article, editor Michael Maloney wrote: "We saw Laura make the decision to follow Tracy into the hallway at General Hospital after she visited a comatose Lulu. Both women cautiously assessed how the other might be feeling. Tracy didn't want to infringe on Laura's time with her daughter. A vulnerable Laura wanted to reach out to Tracy, who's not always known for her ability to connect emotionally. In a quiet, "small" scene, which soaps are famous for, Laura thanked Tracy for being there for her daughter when she couldn't be."
