= Diego Alcazar =

Fictional character from General Hospital

- General Hospital character
- Portrayed by: Ignacio Serricchio
- Duration: 2004–2006, 2008
- First appearance: October 1, 2004
- Last appearance: March 6, 2008
- Created by: Robert Guza, Jr. Charles Pratt, Jr.
- Introduced by: Jill Farren Phelps
In-universe information
- Other names: Diego Sanchez; Text Message Killer
- Occupation: Mob Soldier
- Parents: Lorenzo Alcazar; Maria Sanchez
- Stepmother: Carly Corinthos (2005)
- Half-sisters: Lila Rae Alcazar
- Uncles: Luis Alcazar
- First cousins: Sage Alcazar

Diego Alcazar is a fictional character from General Hospital, an American soap opera on the ABC network. Diego is the son of Lorenzo Alcazar and Maria Sanchez. Ignacio Serricchio originated the role of Diego in October 2004 and portrayed him until the character's supposed death in November 2006. Serricchio returned briefly in 2008, when it is revealed Diego is alive and terrorizing the citizens of Port Charles as the Text Message Killer.

== Casting ==
Ignacio Serricchio joined the cast in 2004, and remained on contract until November 2006, despite being off-screen from December 2005 until March 2006. In 2006 he amicably left the show, telling Soap Opera Digest, "I was not fired and I didn't quit. [...] It's a win-win for everybody." Despite the character being killed off the series, Serricchio briefly reprised the role of Diego in 2008 as the Text Message Killer villain, before the character died again.

== Storylines ==
=== 2004–06 ===
After being taken in as a foster child by Courtney Matthews, 17-year-old Diego began acting out with Brook Lynn Ashton. Eventually he finds out his father is crime boss and arms dealer Lorenzo Alcazar, and Maria Sanchez, who Diego grew up believing was his sister, is actually his mother. Diego begins living with his father and following in his criminal footsteps.

In May 2005 Diego takes a liking to Maxie Jones and breaks up with his current girlfriend, Brook Lynn. It eventually turns out Diego is the Port Charles University stalker who had been drugging girls and taking pictures of them, including Maxie and Brook. He claims he was getting revenge for the death of his cousin, Sage Alcazar, who was locked in a freezer by Brook and Georgie Jones leading up to her stabbing by Mary Bishop. Lorenzo turns Diego in to the police for his crimes, but Diego runs out of the police station, holding Georgie hostage. He is ultimately caught and sent to prison, but returns to Port Charles a few months later. Serricchio spoke to Soap Opera Digest about the turn of his character, saying, "I think everybody has that [dark] side. I don’t know if it’s because he’s a bad person. I think it’s the teenage hormones that really got to him. You hear of kids that are wonderful human beings and all of a sudden they snap — and it comes out of nowhere. So, it’s more of a psychological thing. It doesn’t matter if he comes back or not. I’m good to go both ways."

In March 2006, Diego develops a relationship with Georgie, who was fighting with her husband Dillon Quartermaine, especially after he found out she had been writing to Diego while he was in prison. Diego teamed up with Lulu Spencer, who had a crush on Dillon, to break up Dillon and Georgie. The plan works and Diego and Georgie start dating until they realize what Diego and Lulu had done. Diego told Georgie he accepted her for who she was and loved her and refused to give up on them which touched Georgie.

In November 2006, Diego works with Lorenzo to try to frame Sam McCall, Jason Morgan, and Damian Spinelli. In a shootout, Sam shoots Diego in self-defense, and everyone is led to believe he is dead.

=== 2007–08: Text message killer ===
In September 2007, Jason Morgan and Carly Corinthos Jacks find her nanny Leticia's body on the floor with a telephone cord wrapped around her neck. Sonny Corinthos believes that Leticia's death is a message sent by the Zaccharas, a new crime family in town. He begins receiving text messages, explaining that the killing will not stop at Leticia: "Nanny got the phone cord. Who comes next?"

Carly finds out that her cousin, Lulu Spencer, is texting Johnny Zacchara. Worried, Carly begins texting him, pretending to be Lulu. Then Carly receives a text message from an unknown number including photos of her and Jax that had been taken through her phone without her knowledge. After receiving an invitation to the Black and White Ball thrown by Nikolas Cassadine and Emily Quartermaine, Carly receives the text message, "See U at the ball".

At the Black and White Ball, Carly sends text messages to the killer, planning to meet him in the study. She waits there until Cooper Barrett walks in. Carly holds Coop at gun point, but he pleads his innocence. Maxie Jones arrives and they leave. Later that night, Carly is nearly strangled herself, but Johnny arrives in time and saves her life. Later in the evening, Emily and Nikolas are in the ballroom when someone knocks Nikolas unconscious and begins strangling Emily. Nikolas later wakes up to see Emily's lifeless body next to him. Word of Emily's passing spreads as everyone mourns her death, and fears of the Text Message Killer grow.

Weeks later, Georgie Jones, Maxie's sister, receives a text message saying, "Seen ur sis?". Later that day, Maxie returns home to find the killer waiting for her, who begins strangling her. Georgie arrives home as the killer runs past her. The next day, as Maxie gets another text message from the killer, Georgie notices Coop looking at Maxie strangely as he holds his cell phone. Georgie begins asking questions about Coop's whereabouts at the ball and the day Maxie was strangled. Georgie enlists Damian Spinelli's help in proving that Coop is the killer. Spinelli finds out that a female soldier was strangled where Coop was stationed in Iraq, furthering their suspicions.

Legacy character Georgie Jones (Lindze Letherman, pictured above with Bradford Anderson's Damian Spinelli), was one of Diego's many victims as the Text Message Killer.

On December 17, 2007, Georgie gets a text message saying, "Tell Sis to meet in park." Georgie goes alone, and is about to call 911 when someone emerges from the bushes. Shortly thereafter, Georgie's lifeless body is discovered by Spinelli. Word of Georgie's death spreads as the entire town grieves the loss. Later, Coop arrives late to meet Maxie, who asks him why his hands are cold. Meanwhile, a mysterious new waiter at Kelly's, Daniel, is seen to be very suspicious during conversations that involve the Text Message Killer. He is also seen wrapping a piece of string around the neck of a small doll.

Coop's DNA is a match to the skin found under Georgie's fingernails, furthering his position as the prime suspect. He attempts to explain that the DNA came from Georgie scratching him in a panic when he stopped to ask her if she was okay alone in the park. On January 25, 2008, Coop is found dead in his room, and it is presumed he hanged himself out of guilt and was the killer.

Sam McCall is then strangled by a masked man. She fights him off but is hit by a car after running into the street. Sam is convinced the Text Message Killer is alive, meanwhile Maxie enlists Spinelli's help with proving Coop's innocence. Logan Hayes begins acting suspiciously, and it is revealed that his ribs are badly bruised right after Sam's fight with the killer. They warn his girlfriend Lulu Spencer, who sneaks into his apartment and finds a ski mask, gloves and a cell phone piggy back device. Logan refutes her claims and says he was planning to frame his rival, Johnny Zacchara. She tries to leave, but Logan grabs her. Lulu, in a desperate attempt to get away, hits Logan with a wrench and knocks him out.

Sam returns home from the hospital, where the killer slips a cord around her neck. She fights free and the man reveals his face, showing he is Diego Alcazar. Diego explains to Sam that after he was shot, his father felt his pulse and took him to South America for treatment. His father planned to come live with him there, but never came because Jason Morgan killed him. Diego vowed to make Sonny and Jason pay, and planned to kill their loved ones to make them suffer. He explains that he planned to kill Carly first, but Letica found him so he killed her instead. Then he decided to scare his victims before killing them. He began to send text messages to taunt Sonny and Jason. Diego then kidnaps Sam and holds her hostage at a warehouse. There he continues to explain to Sam why he targeted his victims. He says he strangled Emily because she was Jason's sister. He targeted Maxie next because of her involvement in sending him to prison for the PCU stalkings. He meant to kill Maxie instead of Georgie in the park, but once Georgie saw who he was he felt he was forced to kill her. He killed Cooper because he was getting too close to figuring out Diego was the killer. He went after Alexis Davis both because she had killed his uncle Luis Alcazar and because she is Sam's mother. He went after Sam both to hurt Jason and because Sam had shot him. He then places a bomb in Sam's lap and leaves.

Sam manages to get free. She tries to escape through the ducts but Diego has set it up so it would lead her right back to him. Diego returns to the warehouse and puts Sam in the trunk of his car. He goes back to her apartment to pack her bags and make it look like she left town. However, he forgets to take her cell phone, which is later found by Jason. When Diego leaves the apartment, he finds Elizabeth Webber standing outside and drugs her, kidnaps her, and handcuffs her in the back seat of his car. Max Giambetti sees him and tries to stop him but he hits him with his car. Elizabeth wakes up as Diego is driving them to the Hangman's Bridge. She claws at him, which causes Diego to wreck the car, which teeters on the edge of the bridge. Jason and Lucky Spencer show up and manage to rescue Sam and Elizabeth. Lucky gets shot by Diego, who gets away in the process.

Nikolas and Nadine Crowell go to the warehouse to look for Diego. Diego finds Nadine alone, and holds her hostage with bombs set to explode. He goes back to his headquarters where Nikolas finds him. The two struggle and Diego attempts to strangle Nikolas and escapes. Diego finds Maxie and Spinelli and is ready to strangle Maxie when Nikolas returns. Maxie stabs him with a pole bar and Nikolas punches him. A rope gets around Diego's neck when Nikolas attacks him. He tries to get away, but he ends up falling off of the catwalk and hangs himself to death.

== Victims ==
Victim	Date	Crime	Result	Reason
Leticia Juarez	September 10, 2007	Strangled	Died	Saw him at Carly's house
Carly Corinthos Jacks	November 1, 2007	Stalked and strangled	Survived	Betrayed Lorenzo Alcazar
Emily Quartermaine	November 1, 2007	Strangled	Died	Family of Jason Morgan
Maxie Jones	December 7, 2007; March 5, 2008	Stalked and strangled	Survived	Helped send him to prison for the PCU stalking
Georgie Jones	December 17, 2007	Strangled	Died	Mistook for Maxie Jones
Alexis Davis	January 23, 2008	Strangled	Survived	Killed Luis Alcazar
Cooper Barrett	January 25, 2008	Hanged	Died	Close to finding out Diego was the killer
Sam McCall	February 2008	Stalked; strangled; kidnapped	Survived	Shot Diego; ex-fiancée of Jason Morgan
Elizabeth Webber	February 2008	Drugged; kidnapped	Survived	Saw Diego at Sam McCall's apartment
Max Giambetti	February 28, 2008	Hit with his car	Survived	Tried to stop him from kidnapping Sam McCall and Elizabeth Webber
Lucky Spencer	February 29, 2008	Shot	Survived	Tried to save Sam McCall and Elizabeth Webber
Nadine Crowell	March 4, 2008	Drugged; kidnapped	Survived	Saw Diego at the warehouse
Nikolas Cassadine	March 5, 2008	Strangled	Survived	Self-preservation
