= Virginia's Run =

- Film poster
- Directed by: Peter Markle
- Written by: Valarie Trapp & Peter Markle
- Starring: Lindze Letherman; Rachel Skarsten; Gabriel Byrne
- Music by: Nicholas Pike
- Production companies: MGM Home Entertainment; Alliance Atlantis; Knightscove Entertainment Corporation; Holedigger Films; Wardenclyffe Entertainment; Virginia's Run Productions
- Distributed by: MGM Home Entertainment
- Release date: March 1, 2005
- Running time: 105 minutes
- Countries: United States; Canada
- Language: English

Virginia's Run is a 2002 Canadian-American independent coming-of-age drama film directed by Peter Markle and starring Lindze Letherman, Rachel Skarsten, and Gabriel Byrne. It was filmed in Shelburne, Nova Scotia. The original screenplay was written by Valarie Trapp about her maternal grandmother, Virginia.

== Plot ==
Virginia Lofton is a 13-year-old girl living with her older sister Caroline and their father Ford. Deborah, the mother of Virginia and Caroline, was killed three years earlier after a fall in a riding accident. Ford has sold their horse, Twister, to a neighbor and forbidden his daughters from riding in an effort to keep them safe. Ford and Caroline both blame Twister for Deborah's death. Twister dies in childbirth while she delivers a foal and Virginia names the foal Stormy.

Virginia sneaks out to care for Stormy and ride him at night. The owner, Blake, tries to train Stormy to race for his son Darrow, who is also Caroline's boyfriend, but the horse doesn't get along well with him. Blake decides to sell Stormy and Virginia is heartbroken. Ford is able to track down the person who bought Stormy and he buys him back to give to Virginia as a birthday present.

Virginia has started working with one of Blake's trainers, Jessie. Virginia tells her how much she loves horses and how riding them is a way to remember her mom. After trying to reason with him Ford explains to Jessie that he's trying to protect Virginia. Jessie tries to get Ford to understand that by not letting Virginia ride, he is only crushing her spirit. Ford realizes that Deborah wouldn't have wanted him to stop riding or to keep Virginia away from horses. He starts riding with Virginia and giving her lessons. There is a race on Memorial Day and he thinks that she and Stormy are ready.

Virginia is riding by herself and she comes across Darrow riding with his buddies. He challenges her to a race to the train tracks and Virginia barely makes it, missing the train by a few feet. Darrow realizes that she is a better rider and that he needs to do something to prevent her from beating him in the race. He and his buddies kidnap Stormy. When Virginia finds out that Stormy is missing, she is distraught. Her father believes that Stormy has just escaped, but she tells her sister that she believes Darrow stole him. Caroline thinks that she can find out what happened by coming on to one of his friends, who tells her where to find Stormy. Virginia finds Stormy and gets to the town square where the race is about to begin. The race officials refuse to let her race because she is late, but after the crowd starts chanting, "Let Virginia Ride! Let Virginia Ride!" she is allowed to participate.

She starts out behind but catches up to the pack. Darrow was in the lead since the beginning, but when he sees Virginia he resorts to cheating. He knocks her off her horse and then hides a trail marker flag, so she will get lost. When she can't figure out which way to go by looking at her map, Stormy knows she is lost and he tells her which way to go. She catches up to Darrow again and wins the race.

Darrow's father convinces the MC to disqualify Virginia for some vague and unspecified violation and Darrow tries to accept the trophy. Virginia notices something in his pocket and tells Caroline to check it out. She sneaks up to him and pulls out the flag. He is disqualified for cheating and Virginia accepts the trophy while two men from the audience toss the MC into a water trough.

At home, the family is eating dinner with Jessie. Blake has fired Jessie and Caroline has broken up with Darrow. Virginia comments that they are happier than they have been in a long time. She walks outside to feed Stormy and knows she would not won the race if not for memories of her mother.

== Cast ==
- Lindze Letherman as Virginia Lofton
- Rachel Skarsten as Caroline Lofton
- Gabriel Byrne as Ford Lofton
- Joanne Whalley as Jessie Eastwood
- Robert Miranda as Blake Raines
- Kevin Zegers as Darrow Raines
- Jeremy Akerman as Huntington Crane
- Jocelyn Cunningham as Lydia
- John Paul Tremblay as J.P.
- Robb Wells as Rob
- John Dunsworth as Cop

== See also ==
- List of films about horses
