= Courtney Matthews =

Fictional character from General Hospital

- General Hospital character
- Portrayed by: Alicia Leigh Willis
- Duration: 2001–2006; 2015; 2020
- First appearance: December 20, 2001
- Last appearance: September 17, 2020
- Created by: Megan McTavish
- Introduced by: Jill Farren Phelps (2001); Frank Valentini (2015, 2020)
In-universe information
- Other names: Courtney Quartermaine; Courtney Morgan; Courtney Jacks
- Occupation: Founder of the Courtney Matthews Foundation; CEO of Pride-Phillips; Waitress; Stripper at the Oasis
- Father: Mike Corbin
- Mother: Janine Matthews
- Half-brothers: Sonny Corinthos
- Spouse: A. J. Quartermaine (2002–2005); Jason Morgan (2003–2004); Jasper Jacks (2005–2006)
- Sons: Spencer Cassadine
- Nephews: Dante Falconeri; Michael Corinthos (adoptive); Morgan Corinthos
- Nieces: Kristina Davis; Lila McCall; Avery Corinthos; Donna Corinthos

Courtney Matthews is a fictional character from General Hospital, an American soap opera on the ABC network. She is the daughter of Mike Corbin and Janine Matthews, and the half-sister of mobster Sonny Corinthos. Courtney was portrayed by Alicia Leigh Willis from December 20, 2001, until February 21, 2006. Willis received two consecutive Emmy nominations for "Outstanding Younger Actress." Willis returned to the role of Courtney for a guest stint in May 2015, as part of a fan-favorite vote; she again returned in 2020.

== Casting ==
In September 2001, General Hospital released a casting call for Courtney, described to be in her early 20s and "sexy, vibrant and dynamic." The character was speculated to be the sister of Sonny Corinthos, played by Maurice Benard. Benard had hinted at a recent fan club event that Sonny's sister would be brought on canvas. Alicia Leigh Willis was cast in the role of Courtney in December 2001. Casting director Mark Teschner fought for her to be hired in the role, and coached her before her callback with the show's executive producer at the time Jill Farren Phelps. Years later, Teschner spoke highly of his experience with Willis, "She nailed it and she got the role and four years later, she was one of the most successful additions on the show. That's also very gratifying when you fight for somebody and they do you right by doing a great job with the role."

In 2006, Willis chose not to renew her contract. She was written off the show, but at her goodbye party on set, Jill Farren Phelps asked if she would stay on and wrap up her character's pregnancy storyline, to which Willis agreed. As the story played out, Willis voiced her opinion on Soap Talk on her character's future, "I love playing Courtney and to see someone else come in, it's like, 'It's my character!' I don't want to see someone else come in, but if they do, I wish them all the luck." Although the network had initially announced recasting the role, it was later confirmed that the character would in fact be killed off. Willis last appeared on February 21, 2006. She briefly returned in 2015, and on September 17, 2020, as a ghost, to facilitate Max Gail's exit from the role of Mike Corbin.

== Storylines ==
=== 2001–2004 ===
Soon after her arrival in Port Charles, Courtney falls in love and marries A. J. Quartermaine. A.J. uses her to get to his biological son Michael Corinthos III, the illegally adopted child of Courtney's half-brother Sonny Corinthos. When Courtney defends A.J. to his family, he realizes he truly loves her, and stops trying to trade Courtney for Michael. The Quartermaine family freezes A.J.'s bank account, leading him further into his alcoholism. After being blackmailed into stripping due to A.J.'s drunk driving crash, A.J. becomes verbally abusive and has Courtney purposely stalked by Coleman Ratcliffe, the strip club's owner, so that he can finally feel like a hero and rescue her.

Courtney finds out what A.J. is doing and asks for a divorce, with which he presumably complies. Meanwhile, Courtney had turned to Sonny's enforcer Jason Morgan for help with the stalker, and develops feelings for him. Courtney falls in love with Jason, which causes tension between Jason and Sonny. After many trials, they finally marry in a private ceremony in France. However, Courtney miscarries their child, which causes strain on their relationship. She also feels that Jason's lifestyle makes her act in ways she never had before, including shooting officer Brian Beck. Although Brian knows Courtney had shot him, he frames Zander Smith, because he has fallen in love with Courtney. During a fire at the Port Charles Hotel, Detective Capelli mortally wounds Brian, who dies in the hospital with Courtney at his side. Courtney eventually decides that due to the dangerous nature of Jason's lifestyle, she would rather leave him than watch him die for the mob, and they divorce.

=== 2005–06, 2015, 2020 ===
Months later, Courtney declares her independence and begins a foundation for underprivileged children. Jasper "Jax" Jacks signs on to lend credibility to her new endeavor. Courtney also takes in a foster child, 17-year-old Diego, who she finds out is the son of weapons dealer Lorenzo Alcazar. She tries to protect Diego from the truth but eventually tells him. Meanwhile, Jax and Courtney continue to bond. Jax bets Courtney $10 million that he can seduce her in three months. Courtney accepts, believing beating Jax at his own game will be a breeze. Jax proves more difficult to resist than she bargained for. The two slowly fall in love and Jax eventually proposes to Courtney. A.J. returns to town and announces that his divorce from Courtney was never finalized, but he is presumed dead shortly thereafter. Courtney and Jax marry on June 3, 2005, in a ceremony in the park.

The newlyweds decide to have a surrogate child, as Courtney was left barren from her miscarriage. When Jax begins bonding with their surrogate mother, Elizabeth Spencer, it marks the beginning of the demise of their relationship. During this time, Courtney finds friendship and solace in Nikolas Cassadine, who is married to Emily Quartermaine, which quickly turns into an adulterous affair. Courtney miraculously becomes pregnant. Jax changes the DNA results to say he is the father, but Courtney and Nikolas still choose to fight Jax for custody. However, Courtney sees Nikolas and his ex-wife Emily together, and she breaks up with Nikolas, thinking that Nikolas and Emily belong together.

In early January 2006, Courtney leaves town to have her baby in peace. She returns in February 2006, and contracts the Encephalitis virus plaguing Port Charles. She sees Nikolas, and the two renew their love and get engaged. Faced with the choice between her life or her baby's, Courtney chooses her son's life over her own. After the birth, Courtney suggests that Jax names the baby John, after his father. Jax finally admits to Courtney that Nikolas is the father. Though upset with him for lying, she forgives him, and asks to see Nikolas. However, Nikolas arrives too late, and Courtney dies before she can tell Nikolas he is the father. Jax hides the truth after her death and raises her baby as his own, naming him John Michael Jacks. The truth is eventually revealed to Nikolas a few months later by Robin Scorpio, and Nikolas subsequently changes John's name to Spencer Cassadine.

In May 2015, Courtney appears to her son Spencer to help him realize that he is not disfigured from the fire that injured him months earlier, and to help him to become a better person. Before leaving, Courtney assures Spencer that she loves him and that she is always with him. In September 2020, Courtney appears as an angel to help her father with dying.
