= Georgie Jones =

Fictional character from General Hospital

- General Hospital character
- Lindze Letherman as Georgie Jones
- Portrayed by: Lindze Letherman (2002–18); (and child actors)
- Duration: 1995–2007; 2010; 2013; 2018
- First appearance: March 7, 1995
- Last appearance: February 9, 2018
- Created by: Claire Labine
- Introduced by: Wendy Riche (1995); Jill Farren Phelps (2002, 2010); Frank Valentini (2013, 2018)
- Book appearances: Robin's Diary
- Spin-off appearances: General Hospital: Night Shift
In-universe information
- Other names: Georgianna Jones; Georgie Quartermaine
- Occupation: Student; Waitress; Hospital volunteer
- Family: Scorpio/Jones
- Parents: Frisco Jones; Felicia Jones
- Stepfather: Mac Scorpio
- Brothers: Cody Bell (Step)
- Sisters: Maxie Jones
- Spouse: Dillon Quartermaine (2006)
- Grandparents: Andrew Jones Sr.; Cindy Jones; Peter Cummings; Bertha Ramirez
- Aunts and uncles: Tony Jones; Robert Scorpio (step)
- Nieces and nephews: Georgie Spinelli; James West
- First cousins: Robin Scorpio; Sasha Gilmore (step); B. J. Jones; Lucas Jones (adoptive)

Georgie Jones is a fictional character on the ABC soap opera General Hospital. She is the daughter of supercouple Frisco and Felicia Jones. Previously played by various child actresses, Georgie is primarily portrayed by Lindze Letherman, who appeared from September 3, 2002 to December 18, 2007. Letherman temporarily returned in 2010, 2013, and 2018.

== Casting ==
The role of Georgie was played on a recurring status through the character's child years, including Alana and Marina Norwood in 1995, Ryan and Caitlin Cohen in 1995, Caroline and Elizabeth van Heil in 1996, and Breck Bruns from 1997 until 2002. Lindze Letherman took over the role on a contract basis on September 3, 2002. She left the show due to lack of major storylines for her character, last appearing on December 18, 2007. Letherman made brief guest appearances on March 26–29, 2010, July 11–12, August 22, and December 5, 2013. She made one final appearance on February 9, 2018.

== Storylines ==
Georgie is born Georgianna Jones on March 7, 1995, under a table at a club owned by Luke Spencer. Georgie's birth year is later changed to 1989 when Letherman took over the role in 2002 as a SORAS'd teenager She was conceived when professional spy Frisco came back to town to visit his first daughter Maxie who needed a heart transplant. Frisco and his ex-wife Felicia slept together in relief Maxie is going to live. She is named Georgie because her sister, Maxie Jones, likes the name George. Initially, Felicia isn't sure whether Frisco or her fiancé Mac Scorpio was Georgie's father, but a DNA test proved Frisco to be the father. Frisco leaves town and does not have an active role in raising his daughters. Georgie is kidnapped as a baby by evil serial killer Ryan Chamberlain, who was dating and stalking Felicia. Ryan renames Georgie "Celeste." Eventually Ryan is thwarted and Georgie is returned. Felicia and Mac marry the following year, and Mac becomes the primary father figure in Maxie and Georgie's lives, even after his marriage to Felicia ends, with both Georgie and Maxie refer to Mac as their father.

Georgie is viewed as the smart, sensible sister in comparison with her feistier older sister Maxie Jones. Wanting to break out of that stereotype and convince Lucas Jones to like her, she recruits Dillon Quartermaine as a stand-in boyfriend. The two end up falling in love. Soon after they began dating, Dillon gets involved with the mob, and Georgie is not pleased. When mob boss Lorenzo Alcazar's niece Sage comes to town, Georgie becomes jealous when Sage is infatuated with Dillon. The couple briefly split up in 2004 when a complicated plot leads Dillon to betray Georgie and sleep with Sage. To make Dillon jealous, Georgie hires a boy to pretend to be her boyfriend. The two couples check into the Port Charles Hotel the night the hotel burns to the ground, however both couples survive the ordeal. Romantic interest is restored in Dillon and Georgie after the experience.

In August 2004, Georgie and Dillon are trapped in the Quartermaine mansion with the rest of the Port Charles teen scene while a killer runs around the mansion. They narrowly survive, but Georgie carries a lot of guilt when Sage is found and killed after being locked in the freezer as a prank. In March 2005, Georgie and Dillon sleep together for the first time. In February 2006, Dillon is infected by a deadly virus epidemic. Georgie and Dillon decide to get married in the hospital chapel before Dillon dies. However, Dillon instead starts to improve. The couple realize that they may be too young for marriage.

In June 2006, Lulu Spencer sets her eyes on Dillon. She schemes with Diego Alcazar to break up the couple, who wanted Georgie to himself. Lulu lies to Dillon and said she saw Georgie and Diego having sex. Georgie denies the incident but Dillon chooses not to believe her. Lulu and Dillon sleep together, pushing Georgie and Dillon even farther apart. Dillon and Georgie divorce, but later start dating again. Not long after, Georgie and Dillon both realize the spark is gone, and end things between them. Dillon leaves town when his half-brother, Ned Ashton, gets him a job in California working for a movie director.

Georgie then forms a crush on Damien Spinelli, and is heartbroken when Spinelli goes to the Black and White Ball with Nadine Crowell. Georgie asks Spinelli to join her and her family at the Scorpio House for Thanksgiving dinner. At Emily Quartermaine's funeral, Georgie tells Dillon she has met someone new, but still doesn't reveal her feelings to Spinelli.

Maxie is nearly strangled to death and starts receiving text messages from the Text Message Killer. Georgie is worried and fears for her sister's safety. She became suspicious of Maxie's boyfriend, Cooper Barrett, and teams up with Spinelli to prove Cooper is the killer. On December 17, 2007, Spinelli finally realizes Georgie's feelings for him after talking to his friend Jason Morgan. As he considers what to do, he is walking through the park when he finds Georgie's lifeless body, strangled by the Text Message Killer. Spinelli calls the police and tries to revive her but is unable to. Mac, Maxie, and Robin are devastated to find out Georgie has been murdered. Spinelli talks to Jason about his guilt over his inability to protect her, and not realizing Georgie’s feelings for him until it was too late.

Felicia returns to attend Georgie's funeral on December 20. Dillon comes back to town and is devastated to find out Georgie is dead. Georgie's funeral is attended by numerous citizens of Port Charles. Maxie delivers Georgie's eulogy where she thanks the guests for the ways they cared about and loved Georgie, and then goes on to berate Felicia for abandoning them. Maxie later sees her crying at Georgie's grave. Robin goes to see Patrick Drake for comfort, and becomes pregnant after they sleep together. Robin sees the baby as a blessing from Georgie. Maxie is inconsolable over Georgie's death and lashes out at many people. Spinelli and Maxie team up to find the Text Message Killer and prove Cooper's innocence. They suspect Logan Hayes and Johnny Zacchara, but find out it is Diego Alcazar. It's learned that Georgie died because she received a text message meant for Maxie, and went to the park in an effort to protect Maxie. She was killed for being at the wrong place at the wrong time.

Georgie appears many times as ghost, firstly to Maxie on March 26 and 29, 2010, as she battles pneumonia in the hospital. In July 2013, Georgie appears to Maxie again after Maxie avoids telling Lulu the truth that the baby she is carrying is actually hers. Georgie later appears to Maxie to show her what she would miss if she died on the table after having an emergency C-section after having a complication with the birth of her baby. Georgie sees Felicia and Mac sitting in the waiting room, and in a touching moment, smiles at them, kissing each of them on their cheeks. Although Mac and Felicia cannot see their daughter, Felicia asks Mac "Did you feel that?". That December 5, 2013, Georgie is seen in the cemetery trying to convince Maxie not to kill herself. When Maxie can't hear her, she touches Robin's shoulder to get her to go find Maxie. On February 9, 2018, Georgie appears once again to give Maxie strength to attend the funeral of her husband Nathan West.
