= Lindze Letherman =

American actress

- Occupations: Actress, Equestrian, Trick Rider, General Manager
- Years active: 1997–2018
- Spouse: Adam Etchegoyen (m. 2014)
- Website: linkedin.com/in/lindze-letherman-02763bb6

Lindze Letherman is an American retired actress, equestrian, trick rider, and general manager. She is known for her roles as Molly in Toothless, Virginia Lofton in Virginia's Run, and Georgie Jones in General Hospital.

== Career ==
Letherman appeared on General Hospital as Georgie Jones, the daughter of soap opera supercouple Frisco and Felicia Jones and one-half of the popular teen couple "Dillon and Georgie".

Letherman had a small role in the 2002 movie Clockstoppers as Kelly Gibbs, and has made guest appearances on TV shows, talk shows, and game shows.

Letherman left General Hospital in December 2007, when her character was killed off. She temporarily returned on March 26, 2010, and March 29, 2010, as a ghost. She once again appeared temporarily returned to speak to Maxie Jones on July 11–12 and December 5, 2013, once again as a ghost.

Letherman also starred in an Independent film in 2007 entitled Stamped! which was filmed with Higher Definition Media, Inspiration Studios and Frontier Film, and was released on February 27, 2009.

== Personal life ==
Letherman married Adam Etchegoyen on Saturday October 18, 2014. The couple exchanged vows at Stolpman Vineyards in Santa Barbara, CA. She retired from acting in 2018 after she left "General Hospital" and moved to Aspen, Colorado. Today Letherman is a general manager for Hooch.

== Filmography ==
Film
Year	Film	Role	Notes
1997	Toothless	Molly	
1999	Bicentennial Man	Young Grace Martin	
2002	Clockstoppers	Kelly Gibbs	
2002	Virginia's Run	Virginia Lofton	
2009	Stamped!	Tori	
Television
Year	Title	Role	Notes
1997	Jenny	Jenny at 8	1 episode
1997	Family Matters	Allyson	1 episode
1998	Suddenly Susan	Faith	1 episode
1999	Passions	Rosie	3 episodes
1999	Profiler	Lindsay	1 episode
1999	Seven Days	Young Claire	1 episode
2000	18 Wheels of Justice	Caroline	1 episode
2002–2007, 2010, 2013,2018	General Hospital	Georgie Jones	Role: September 2002-December 2007, March 26, 2010 – March 29, 2010, July 11, 2013, February 9, 2018.
2005	8 Simple Rules	Megan	1 episode
2007	General Hospital: Night Shift	Georgie Jones	1 episode
2008	Life in General	Maddie Whittaker	unknown episodes
