= Emily Quartermaine =

Fictional character from General Hospital

- General Hospital character
- Natalia Livingston as Emily Quartermaine
- Portrayed by: Amber Tamblyn (1995–2001); Natalia Livingston (2003–2014)
- Duration: 1995–2001; 2003–2009; 2013–2014
- First appearance: January 20, 1995
- Last appearance: April 1, 2014
- Created by: Claire Labine
- Introduced by: Wendy Riche (1995); Jill Farren Phelps (2003); Frank Valentini (2013)
- Book appearances: Robin's Diary
In-universe information
- Other names: Emily Bowen; Paige Bowen; Emily Smith; Emily Cassadine
- Occupation: Medical intern
- Family: Quartermaine (adoptive)
- Parents: Hank Bowen; Paige Bowen
- Adoptive parents: Alan Quartermaine; Monica Quartermaine
- Sisters: Rebecca Shaw
- Half-brothers: Jason Morgan (adoptive); Andrew Cain (adoptive); A.J. Quartermaine (adoptive)
- Half-sisters: Skye Quartermaine (adoptive); Dawn Winthrop (adoptive)
- Husband: Zander Smith (2003); Nikolas Cassadine (2004–2005)
- Grandparents: Edward Quartermaine (adoptive); Lila Quartermaine (adoptive)
- Uncles: Bradley Ward (adoptive); Jimmy Lee Holt (adoptive)
- Aunts: Corrie Bowen; Tracy Quartermaine (adoptive); Veronica Bard (adoptive)
- Nephews: Michael Corinthos (adoptive); Jake Webber (adoptive); Danny Morgan (adoptive); Oscar Nero (adoptive)
- Nieces: Lila Rae Alcazar (adoptive); Emily Cain (adoptive)
- First cousins: Justus Ward (adoptive); Faith Ward (adoptive); Ned Ashton (adoptive); Dillon Quartermaine (adoptive); Austin Gatlin Holt (adoptive)

Emily Quartermaine is a fictional character from the ABC soap opera General Hospital. The role was originated on January 20, 1995 by Amber Tamblyn, who portrayed the role until July 11, 2001. Natalia Livingston subsequently played Emily from April 1, 2003 until May 7, 2008, despite the character's death in November 2007. Livingston also appeared for two episodes in 2009, last appearing on June 23. Livingston made a surprise return for the show's 50th anniversary, appearing on April 2, 2013. She returned in 2014 for two subsequent guest appearances: on March 18 and April 1, respectively. In 2005, Livingston won the Daytime Emmy Award for Outstanding Supporting Actress in a Drama Series for her portrayal of Emily.

== Storylines ==
=== 1995–2001 ===
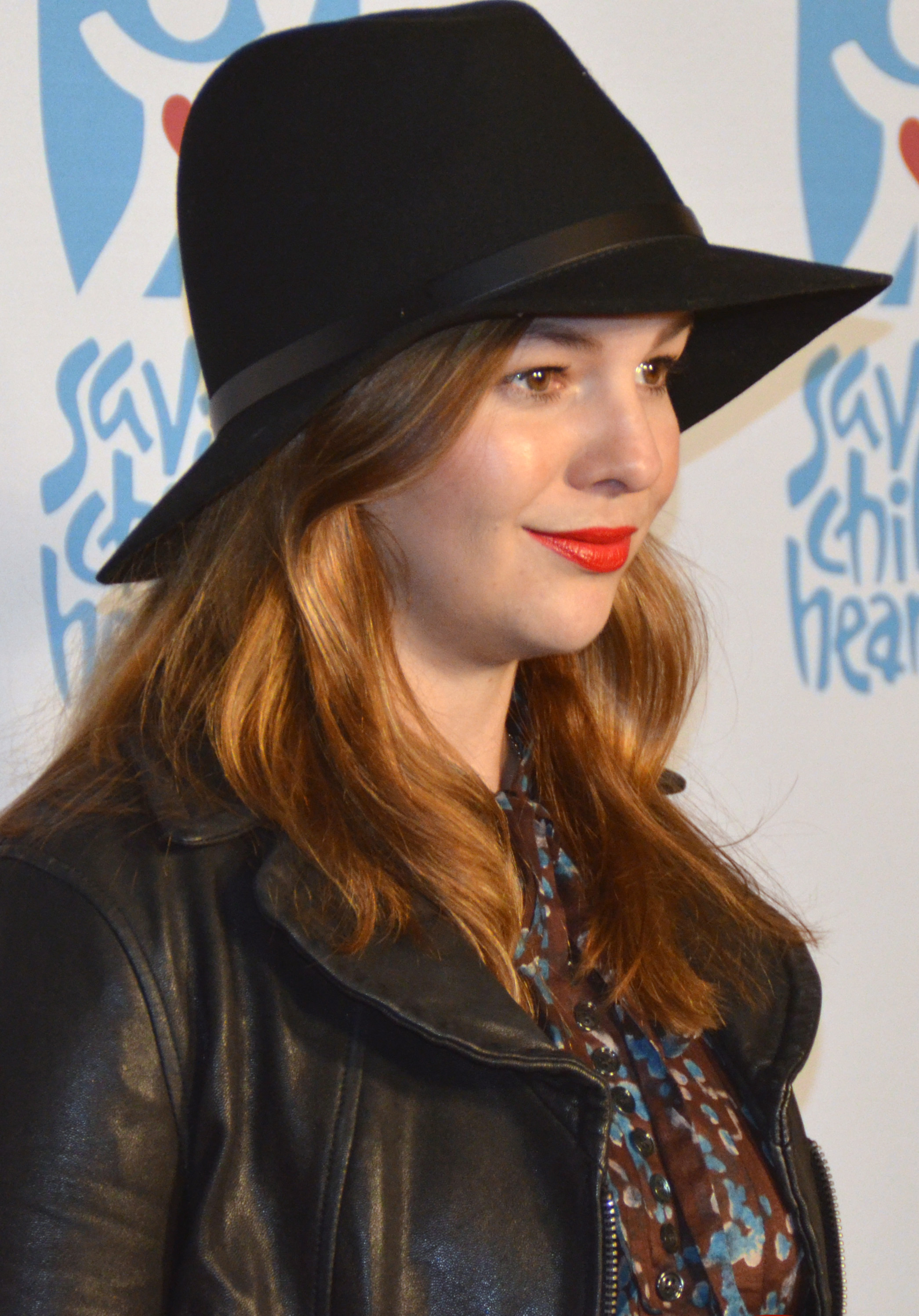
Amber Tamblyn portrayed Emily from 1995 to 2001.

Monica Quartermaine meets Emily's mother Paige Bowen while the two women are undergoing treatment for breast cancer. After Paige dies, Monica and her husband, Alan Quartermaine, become Emily's guardians. Initially resistant to being adopted by the couple, Emily runs away with Lucky Spencer in search of her estranged aunt. The two return, and Emily agrees to let the Quartermaines adopt her.

When Monica has an affair with Dr. Pierce Dorman, Emily turns to drugs with her new friend Matt Reynolds. Pierce sues Monica for sexual harassment. Emily's cousin Ned Ashton discovers Emily's addiction. After Matt overdoses, Pierce is revealed to be the drug supplier and is soon murdered. Initially considered a suspect, Emily is eventually cleared and embarks on a new career in modeling. Emily finds herself the subject of a blackmail attempt, when she receives a photograph of her head photoshopped onto the body of a nude model. She enlists the help of Lucky, his half brother Nikolas Cassadine, and their mutual friend Elizabeth Webber. They discover the culprit is photographer Tom Baker, also responsible for raping Elizabeth. He is prosecuted, and sent to prison for blackmailing Emily. Due to lack of evidence, he cannot be prosecuted for raping Elizabeth.

In June 1999, Emily met Juan Santiago, a teenager from Puerto Rico. Juan believes local mobster Sonny Corinthos is his biological father. The two learn singer Miguel Morez is his father instead. Emily, who had harbored romantic feelings for Nikolas, begins dating Juan, despite disapproval from Monica and Alan. Juan eventually receives permission from his family to stay in Port Charles. Alan and Monica grow to accept the relationship. Wanting to follow in his father's footsteps as a singer, Juan secures a recording contract at L&B Records, run by Ned and his ex-wife Lois Cerullo and her friend Brenda Barrett. Emily's grandfather, Edward Quartermaine, attempts to sabotage a performance by Ned in order to lure Ned back to ELQ, the family business. Emily is overjoyed when Juan is well received as Ned's opening act, a ploy to buy more time while Ned is being located.

While attending a rave with their friends, Juan and Emily get into a fight, leading to Juan kissing socialite Alison Barrington. Emily spies the kiss, and accepts a drugged beer from a stranger. She strikes up a conversation with a man named Ted. She is later stunned when she awakes the next morning to find herself naked in a bed next to Ted, who has been murdered. Elizabeth, Lucky, and Nikolas agree to help, and hide Ted's body in a freezer at Wyndemere, Nikolas' family estate on Spoon Island. Emily is then blackmailed by Gia Campbell who knows Emily was with Ted before he died. Gia claims she is innocent in regards to Emily's blackmail. Emily's guilt grows when she learns Ted was an undercover police officer. She begins to push Juan away, and her friends learn Gia was actually attempting to blackmail Emily over her drug usage at the rave, not Ted's murder. The friends convince Gia to help them track down Ted's killer. She points them in the direction of drug dealer Zander Smith. They place Ted's body in Zander's trunk. Gia's brother Detective Marcus Taggert attempts to arrest Zander.

Zander takes Emily hostage. The two flee from the police. Emily learns Zander had been working for unethical mob boss Joseph Sorel, who placed a hit on Zander for the problems he had created. When she starts to develop romantic feelings for Zander, Emily chooses to stay with him rather than escape. He reveals Sorel is responsible for Ted's murder. Emily and Zander are tracked to the Canada–US border by her brother Jason Morgan, a mafia enforcer who works for Sorel's rival Sonny Corinthos. Emily convinces him to let Zander cross the border without interference.

Emily returns to Port Charles and the Quartermaines, and is stunned when Zander arrives at her window asking her to run away with him. She declines. Over the objections of her family, Emily continues to spend time with him. She also breaks up with Juan, who later leaves town. With the condition he testifies against Sorel, Sonny agrees to pay his bail and hires Nikolas' aunt, Alexis Davis, to represent Zander. When Zander is freed, he and Emily, Sonny, and Alexis find themselves the target of a gunman outside the Port Charles Police Department. Though Zander was wounded attempting to protect Emily, the Quartermaines decide to send her to boarding school to protect her. Zander finds Emily at her school. The two run away together, before returning to Port Charles.

When Edward learns the two have returned, he has Zander arrested. Alexis bails him out and has him move in with her. Emily leaves the Quartermaine mansion and moves into the boarding house above Kelly's Restaurant. Zander successfully testifies against Sorel, but finds himself in trouble with the law again after Edward is mugged and indicates Zander was the culprit. In exchange for Edward dropping the charges, Emily agrees to break up with Zander.

Zander attempts to return to his roots as a drug dealer, but realizes how much he loves Emily. The two reunite, and have sex for the first time on her prom night. Emily is then shocked when Skye Chandler arrives in Port Charles and reveals that Skye is Alan's illegitimate daughter from a dalliance with Dr. Rae Cummings, making Skye the eldest Quartermaine child. Due to Sorel's threats, Emily and Zander decide to leave town. Skye, jealous of Alan's relationship with Emily, agrees to give them money. Zander and Emily leave by train, but when the train is involved in an accident, Emily is paralyzed from the waist down. To be safe from Sorel while she recovers, Emily leaves for a rehabilitation center far from Port Charles in July, 2001.

=== 2003–07 ===
In spring 2003, Emily, recovered from her injuries, returns to Port Charles, hiding she has developed breast cancer. She decides to forgo chemotherapy, believing it killed her mother, and opts for an herbal protocol. Emily tells only Monica and Alan about her diagnosis. To hide her prognosis from Zander and believing she is going to die, Emily asks an initially reluctant Nikolas to pretend to fake a romantic relationship with her in order to push Zander away and spare Zander watching her die. Nikolas says no at first, but seeing his friend's turmoil and wanting to help, he relents and agrees to the fake romance. At the same time, Nikolas' uncle, Stefan Cassadine, begins pressuring him into marrying Lydia Karenin, a wealthy heiress who can save his family from losing their fortune. Nikolas is suspicious of their motives and happily makes Emily his focus of attention. Nikolas is steadfast in his friendship and support for Emily during this time and takes her to her chemo treatments, runs interference with Zander and Stefan and even threatens to tell Zander the truth if Emily doesn't attend a support group meeting. Monica thanks him for support and mentions it seems like his and Emily's fake romance is the real deal. Although he never states it, Nikolas has begun falling in love with Emily for real. Not knowing Nikolas, her first romantic crush from her teen years, is falling in love with her, Emily tells Zander she and Nikolas are engaged in order to stop Zander from trying to be with her. Although Nikolas is surprised by the announcement, he willingly goes along with it. A skeptical Zander and a desperate Stefan are appalled at the engagement and Stefan tries to insist Nikolas break it off. Nikolas tells Stefan he can either support their engagement or leave town. Stefan relents and offers to throw an engagement party for them as a token of good will, although he is secretly plotting to have Emily killed that evening. On the night of their engagement party, a hitman hired by Stefan accidentally throws Summer Holloway, Lucky's girlfriend, over a cliff to her death in an attempt to murder Emily.

After the support group, Emily is so mad at Nikolas that it fires her up and she starts to feel alive again. She goes to "confront" Nikolas about his manipulation of her and thanks him for giving her everything she needed to fight. While thanking him, she kisses him on the cheek and then they begin to kiss passionately. Immediately afterward, Lydia tells Emily she is hurting Nikolas by marrying him because it will cause him to go bankrupt and Lydia is the one who needs to marry Nikolas to save their fortunes. Emily decides to tell Zander the truth in part because she now believes he won't have to watch her die and in part to set Nikolas free to save his family fortune. When she goes to tell Nikolas she is going to tell Zander the truth, he does not fight it though he clearly is upset at the turn of events. Emily and Zander reunite and Nikolas and Lydia become engaged. Emily begins an aggressive chemotherapy treatment. After these events, Emily overhears Nikolas tell Lydia he may be marrying her, but Emily has his heart and always will. Stunned, Emily runs home and Nikolas follows. They confess their love for one another and kiss, but Emily refuses to treat Zander so badly and tells Nikolas they can't be together. Although they part as "just friends" it is clear they both want to be with each other. Believing Emily is beyond his reach, Nikolas marries Lydia to Stefan's delight and Nikolas' misery.

Monica tells Emily her chemotherapy is destroying her immune system. Emily is forced to stop treatment. Although she loves Zander and he is supportive, it is Nikolas to whom Emily turns with the devastating news of her treatment. Nikolas gets Emily to rally and promise not to give up fighting. She goes on a second chemo treatment and seems to be doing well, but the tests show she isn't faring well and her immune system is waning to the point that she has to be hospitalized. She develops meningitis and believes she is going to die. On her deathbed in her hospital room, Emily marries Zander as a last gift to him. Nikolas watches the ceremony from outside the room. Shortly after, she lapses into unconsciousness. Nikolas doesn't want to leave her during this stage. Alan and Monica permit him to be in the room next to hers overnight. Zander stays with Emily and while she is unconscious she dreams of kissing Nikolas and at the same time, Nikolas dreams of kissing her and bringing her back to life. Buoyed by her dream, Emily recovers to the relief and joy of her family and friends. As Emily recovers and starts married life with Zander, she fights her attraction to Nikolas, attempting to make her marriage work. On Halloween night, Emily confesses her love to Nikolas and they begin kissing only to be interrupted by Zander who lets her have it for all the lies she's told him and the heartache she's put him through. She ends things with Zander and he leaves. Although Nikolas is now divorced, he wants to be sure Emily won't regret her decision so he suggests they call it a night, but Emily insists she won't regret it and they have sex.

Emily and Zander divorce and Nikolas proposes to a joyful Emily. Some of Emily's family object in part because he has lost his family fortune. When Alexis attempts to sell Wyndemere, Emily buys it for Nikolas. Not knowing who the buyer was, he buys Emily's engagement ring and they exchange their gifts on Christmas Eve. They meet Sam McCall, a shipwreck salvager who tells the couple about a treasure on the sunken ship The Courage, belonging to the Cassadines. She salvages the treasure, and Emily and Nikolas put it up for auction at the Port Charles Hotel. Mob boss Lorenzo Alcazar is the highest bidder, but the treasure is stolen shortly before a fire breaks out at the hotel. When Nikolas gives his seat to Emily on the last helicopter evacuating guests, he is presumed dead when an explosion appears to kill him and Jason. Wandering around Wyndemere mourning Nikolas, Emily can't quite believe he's gone when he returns to find Emily sitting at his desk. Zander is also presumed dead. Ric Lansing believes Nikolas is responsible, but Elizabeth believes she is the culprit after fighting with Zander about custody of their son, Cameron. When Emily goes to the home she shared with Zander, he reveals he is alive. Zander, who lost his father in the fire, has become mentally unstable and attempts to get Emily to run away with him again. She refuses, and he takes her hostage. When the police surround the cottage, Zander leads Emily outside. He pushes her to safety, and reaches into his pocket, pretending to have a gun. The police shoot Zander, who dies in Emily's arms.

While driving, Nikolas, who had just purchased wedding rings, learns of the hostage situation and has a car accident, leading everyone to believe he is dead. However, an amnesiac Nikolas was being cared for by Mary Bishop, whose husband Connor Bishop, Nikolas' Doppelgänger, was presumed dead in the Iraq War. Emily convinces Lucky to go on a trip to Mexico that Nikolas had planned for them, and is stunned when she spots Nikolas, who is there with Mary to renew the vows she had made with Connor.

Deciding not to force Nikolas' memory to return, Emily confronts Mary back in Port Charles, but decides to keep the truth from Nikolas, remembering the trauma her brother Jason endured because of his memory loss. When a still amnesiac Nikolas learns his friends and family knew he was and didn't tell him, he rejects them in favor for a life with Mary. Lucky, who had been Emily's support through this ordeal, admits he has romantic feelings for her. She gently rebuffs his advances. During this time, Emily's beloved grandmother Lila Quartermaine dies, leaving Emily as the sole voice of reason in her dysfunctional family.

While Emily decides to become a doctor like her parents, Nikolas recovers his memory, leading to a distraught Mary going insane. A masked Mary goes after Emily, killing Sage Alcazar and another teenager in the process before Nikolas is able to shoot her. Nikolas and Emily become engaged again. Helena Cassadine, Nikolas' grandmother, attempts to kill Emily, and Nikolas throws Helena over a cliff. Emily testifies he was protecting her. Emily was then kidnapped by Connor Bishop, Mary's husband who had gone AWOL and faked his death. Nikolas, Lucky, Elizabeth, and Emily debate about turning Connor in for being AWOL, but agree to help him escape from Canada. When Connor foils their plans, Nikolas turns himself in for Helena's murder. Connor is arrested. Nikolas, after being allowed to marry Emily, is sentenced to life in prison, with the possibility of parole.

Believing Helena is alive, Emily convinces Connor to pretend he is Nikolas, as she instructs him on the finer arts of being a prince. Connor becomes obsessed with Emily, and rapes her. Emily then kills Connor in self-defense. Elizabeth and Lucky arrive, and try to help Emily. While Lucky buries Connor, Elizabeth tries to get Emily to admit Connor raped her. Helena resurfaces and kidnaps Emily, then shoots Lucky, who tries to save Emily. Lucky falls into a coma, and Emily confesses she was raped to her first friend. When Lucky recovers, he moves into Wyndemere with Emily, and attempts to help her recover from the rape. In prison, Nikolas becomes concerned about Emily's reluctance to touch him. She eventually admits Connor raped her. Helena is captured, though Nikolas is devastated Emily cannot be with him because he looks just like her rapist.

Emily tries to make her marriage work, but admits her responses to Nikolas are faked. Their marriage eventually ends when Emily finds out Nikolas was having an affair with Courtney Matthews. She files for divorce, but admits her coldness aided in her marriage to Nikolas failing.

When Sonny learns about Nikolas' affair with Courtney, Sonny's sister, he offers Emily a place to stay. After another train crash, Sonny's ex-girlfriend Reese Marshall dies after not telling Emily about all her symptoms. When Emily questions her decision to be a doctor, Sonny reaffirms her faith in herself. Emily began to develop feelings for Sonny, who told her he did not feel the same, despite his growing romantic interest. Emily saves Michael Corinthos, Sonny's son, from drowning. Sonny contemplates a relationship with her. The two kiss. Jason is able to convince Emily a relationship with a mob boss would ruin Emily's life. Sonny and Emily decide to secretly be a couple, but they end up becoming fodder for tabloids. Emily helps Sonny face his diagnosis of bipolar disorder, and go into therapy. Soon after, though, Sonny ends their relationship.

Alone again, Emily throws herself into her studies. She reconnects with Nikolas, who was now a single father to his and Courtney's son, Spencer Cassadine, following Courtney's death. They bonded while taking care of Spencer. When Spencer was kidnapped by Helena, Emily helped Nikolas rescue him by briefly letting Helena take her hostage. Spencer was rescued, and Nikolas named Emily as Spencer's godmother. The two decide to rekindle their romance, but are caught in a hostage crisis at the Metro Court Hotel. Jerry Jacks, going by the name of Mr. Craig, holds the two and several of their friends hostage with a bomb in order to get a package in the hotel's security vault. When Elizabeth goes into premature labor and her father Alan has a heart attack, Emily is forced to choose which one would be released. With Elizabeth's urging, Alan is released, but his heart attack proves fatal. Jerry goes on to inject Nikolas with a poison requiring a daily antidote. Elizabeth, Robin, and Patrick Drake help Emily develop an antidote that saves Nikolas' life.

When Nikolas starts experiencing periods of rage where he begins to black out, Emily convinces Nikolas to have tests performed. He insists on throwing a ball first to honor their renewed love. Dubbing it a Black and White Ball, he invites all of their friends. The night of the ball, Nikolas proposes to Emily. She happily accepts. Crazed mafia don Anthony Zacchara breaks into the ball, and terrorizes the guests. During Zacchara's rampage, Nikolas experiences another blackout. Jason ties him to a chair to protect the other guests, and takes Emily to the stables to protect her. Emily leaves, though, and finds Nikolas, who has broken free. While arguing with Emily about her leaving for her own safety, Nikolas is knocked out and Emily is strangled to death. Emily's death leaves her family and friends grief-stricken, while Nikolas is devastated.

Nikolas starts seeing Emily, and initially believes she is a ghost. However, he later finds out he has a brain tumor, allowing him to hallucinate Emily. Emily, as Nikolas' hallucination, helps Nikolas track down her killer, Diego Alcazar, the Text Message Killer. Diego dies after a struggle with Nikolas, ending his reign of terror and avenging Emily's death. After debating with his hallucination of Emily, Nikolas opts to remove his tumor. He wakes up from the surgery, holding the engagement ring he gave Emily the night she died.

In 2009, Nikolas is stunned when Emily's unknown twin sister Rebecca Shaw moves to Port Charles. It is later revealed Rebecca found out about Emily, and came to get her hands on Emily's money. She moved to Paris in December 2009.

On the show's 50th Anniversary in 2013, Emily returns as a ghost along with Alan and Rick Webber to help Monica and Tracy quit their feuding. She returns as a ghost a year later to help her brother, A.J., cross over after he was murdered, then again to warn Nikolas to be careful of his fiancée, Britt Westbourne.

Nearly ten years after her death, Emily's adoptive older brother, Drew Cain and his ex-wife, Sam McCall would later have a daughter named Emily Scout Cain, in honor of Emily.
