= The Secret Life of Damian Spinelli =

2011 novel by Carolyn Hennesy

- First edition
- Author: Carolyn Hennesy
- Language: English
- Genre: Mystery
- Publisher: Hyperion
- Publication date: April 5, 2011
- Publication place: United States
- Media type: Print (Hardcover)
- Pages: 256
- ISBN: 1-4424-0853-7

The Secret Life of Damian Spinelli is a 2011 novel written by Carolyn Hennesy. The novel is a tie-in to the television soap-opera General Hospital, as the writing and publication were featured in the series.

== Background ==
The writing of The Secret Life of Damian Spinelli was a storyline on General Hospital, during late 2010 and early 2011. The story featured Damian Spinelli, enlisting Diane Miller to help him write a novel based on his private investigator persona. In January 2011, it was announced that the book would be published.

The book was written by Carolyn Hennesy, who is known for her Pandora book series, and portrays Diane Miller on General Hospital. The book was released on April 5, 2011 which coincided with the series' 48th anniversary. Hennesy said of the book's connection to film noir, "It's not just a nod: it's a whole interpretive dance. When I was approached to write the book from Damian Spinelli's point of view, I was able to incorporate my intense love of film noir and noir fiction. Dashiell Hammett, Raymond Chandler, Orson Welles -- you name it! That combines so well with Spinellis' alter ego, which is right out of "The Third Man" and "Key Largo". That was just a fortuitous blessing."

Hennesy spoke about being approached to write the novel during an interview with Xfinity, "About a year and a half ago Jill Farren Phelps approached me and said that all the higher ups at ABC and the publishing house, Hyperion, and Disney and because of the Pandora series they knew that I was already a published author. So they’re the ones who actually approached me, would I like to write a fictionalized account of all the characters in Port Charles from Spinelli’s point of view. I don’t think I actually have the imagination to pitch the idea to them. They came to me and it took off from there."

Hennesy has talked about what it was like to write the novel, "At one point I stopped and said, 'I didn't write that.' In the book, I wrote 'cheesy grits'. Believe me, there's a difference. I've eaten my way through Georgia on book tours here, so yes, it was important to get that correct. We write what we know. Thank you, Atlanta! Because I am a published author, it was a tiny stroke of genius to have the actress playing the character write the book too. For months, I walked up to my 'General Hospital' co-workers in the make up room and whispered, 'You know, I'm writing a chapter about you in the book.' I actually walked up to Jane Elliot [who plays wealthy Tracy Quartermaine] and said, 'Would you mind acting out a scene for me as Tracy in an opium den?' She loved it!""

== Plot ==
The Secret Life of Damian Spinelli follows the adventures of private investigator, Damian Spinelli, as he attempts to solve several cases around Port Charles.

== Publisher's Note ==
Roughly one year ago, the following manuscript appeared at our offices in a manila envelope bearing no return address. A note inside simply read "No one fires me and gets away with it. From the files of Ms. High-and Mighty Diane Miller. Publish it...and blow the lid off Port Charles."

== Reception ==
The Secret Life of Damian Spinelli received primarily mixed reviews from critics. A more positive review noted that, "Each tale is filled with amusing language and over the top scenarios fans of GH can certainly picture Spinelli getting into but with a Sam Spade-like flair.

The novel achieved New York Times Best Seller status.
