= Damian Spinelli =

Fictional character from General Hospital

- General Hospital character
- Bradford Anderson as Damian Spinelli
- Portrayed by: Bradford Anderson; Blake Berris (2017)
- Duration: 2006–present
- First appearance: November 13, 2006
- Created by: Robert Guza, Jr.
- Introduced by: Jill Farren Phelps
- Book appearances: The Secret Life of Damian Spinelli
- Spin-off appearances: General Hospital: Night Shift
In-universe information
- Other names: Damian Millhouse Spinelli: The Jackal; The Ace of Cyberspace; Assassin of the Internet; Cyber Samson; The Assassin of Cyberspace; Legend of Lexicon; Hudson Rorschach; Bob Terrille
- Occupation: Private investigator; Author; Video game creator; Hacker
- Children: Georgie Spinelli
- Grandparents: Miriam Spinelli

Damian Spinelli is a fictional character on the ABC daytime drama, General Hospital, played by actor Bradford Anderson from November 13, 2006, to December 16, 2013. Spinelli was also one of the characters in the first season of General Hospital: Night Shift, which premiered on July 12, 2007. On May 6, 2014, it was announced that Anderson would be returning to play Spinelli. He returned on May 20, 2014. He later returned once more in late 2014 and again on February 13, 2015. Spinelli returned on October 15, 2015.

== Casting and characterization ==
In September 2006, General Hospital put out a casting call for a "college-aged kid" who was a cross between Seth Green and Spicoli, a character played by Sean Penn in Fast Times at Ridgemont High. The part was won by Anderson, who says he tries to emulate Spicoli's speaking style when playing the character. Spinelli's dialogue, a rapid-fire mix of surfer lingo and Internet slang, has offered comic relief, and an unusual "tech-savvy" character to the show. ABC Soaps in Depth called Spinelli "one of the quirkiest characters daytime has ever seen," while Michael Fairman stated, "Spinelli rates high as one of soaps most recognizable characters, something it has taken other actors and their alter-egos years to pull off." Speaking on Anderson's performance and subsequent inspiration behind its spinoff book, costar Carolyn Hennesy said to Entertainment Weekly, "His mind is so fantastical. When Spinelli is Spinelli, the Spinelli-speak is very difficult to wade through, which is why I think [actor] Bradford Anderson is deserving of something higher than an Emmy. How he has managed that dialogue is genius to me." Anderson says he generally doesn't improvise the part, instead sticking to the script supplied a couple days before filming. The name of the specific writer or writers who create Spinelli's dialogue have not been identified. After indulging his fans in some of his first appearances, Anderson no longer "speaks Spinelli" outside the show. He commented to Soap Opera Digest, "Spinelli does not make public appearances; Bradford does. I leave him at work, and that's more than okay for me."

Anderson initially played the character on a recurring status, but the character proved popular, and actor Bradford Anderson was offered a multi-year contract, which he accepted in May 2007. The character was added to the opening credits sequence on July 6, 2007. Anderson received Daytime Emmy nominations for Outstanding Supporting Actor in 2009, 2010, and 2012, as well as a pre-nomination in 2008.

Anderson also pulled double duty as Spinelli was one of the crossover characters that appeared in the Summer 2007 season of General Hospital: Night Shift.

Spinelli is known for using nicknames for a variety of characters, all of which are derived from one of their perceived attributes; for example, he has dubbed Jason "Stone Cold" for his taciturn and unemotional personality.

On May 24, 2013, Anderson confirmed on Twitter that he had decided not to renew his contract, but would remain with the series on a recurring basis. In late 2013, it was confirmed that Anderson would exit the series, alongside co-star Emily Wilson. Anderson returned to the series on a recurring basis. In December 2016, it was announced that Blake Berris had been temporarily cast in the role, due to Anderson being unavailable, due to a "scheduling conflict".

== Storylines ==
=== 2006–2009 ===
Damian Spinelli is introduced as Lorenzo Alcazar's computer hacker responsible for creating falsified evidence against Sam McCall. Sam and Jason Morgan find him, but are ambushed and Spinelli disappears. Soon after, he is kidnapped by Alcazar along with Lulu Spencer. They are rescued by Jason, and Spinelli runs again. Lulu helps Jason track him down bring him back. Having nowhere else to go, Spinelli moves in with Jason and Sam. He exonerates Sam, and begins working for Jason and Sonny Corinthos. He also provides an ailing Alexis Davis with marijuana to ease the pain caused by her chemotherapy treatments for lung cancer. Meanwhile, he helps Lulu prove that her mother, Laura Spencer did not kill Rick Webber, soon developing a crush on Lulu. He has a vivid Walter Mitty-like imagination; his fantasies portray him as a swashbuckling hero who rescues Lulu from danger. In the February 2007 sweeps storyline, Spinelli helps Jason rescue the hostages at the Metro Court Hotel. In August 2007, Spinelli fantasizes of three beautiful blonde women, whom he rejects in favor of Lulu. The women are played by Holly Madison, Bridget Marquardt and Kendra Wilkinson, the girlfriends of Hugh Hefner who appeared on the reality show The Girls Next Door.

Spinelli becomes friends with Georgie Jones, unaware she has a crush on him. The night he realizes her feelings, he discovers she was killed by the Text Message Killer. Spinelli is distraught and determined to find the killer. Meanwhile, Georgie's sister Maxie Jones enlists his help to prove Cooper Barrett's innocence. The unlikely duo work together, initially arguing, but eventually developing a friendship that turns into a crush for Spinelli. He has Sam Spade-like fantasies, picturing himself as the detective, and Maxie as the femme fatale blonde. They track down the killer, Diego Alcazar, who accidentally hangs himself during the confrontation. Afterwards, they remain close. Spinelli pushes Maxie out of the way of an oncoming car and is hit instead. Soon after, Maxie is humiliated at Johnny Zacchara's trial when she is forced to admit she threatened Logan Hayes to have sex with her. Spinelli tries to comfort her, and they sleep together. Maxie regrets this, feeling she has used him. After she is attacked by the Russian mob, Spinelli carries her to General Hospital, and confesses his love for her. Mac Scorpio forbids Maxie from seeing Spinelli, but Maxie defies her stepfather and moves into an apartment with Lulu.

In early 2009, Spinelli becomes friends with Winnifred Leeds, causing tension between him and Maxie. Spinelli is arrested for treason, and it is revealed Winnifred is an undercover FBI agent. Spinelli finds out he is bait to take down Jason, Sonny and the Zaccharas. Meanwhile, Spinelli enlists Winnifred's help with missing cargo the FBI is pressuring Jason about. They discover spheres of deadly biotoxin have been released at General Hospital. Spinelli stays behind to help, and he makes it out, he and Maxie reunite. Spinelli finds out the FBI is still using him, and leaves town. Maxie urges him to stay in the country, and Spinelli returns. They destroy the evidence the FBI has. Spinelli catches Maxie and Johnny Zacchara kissing on the pier, and confronts Maxie. She is devastated at losing Spinelli, and realizes her feelings. Over time they are able to reconnect, and Spinelli insists on courting Maxie. In July 2009, he proposes. Maxie agrees in order to not hurt him, but the night before their wedding, Spinelli overhears her confessing her fears about marriage. As Spinelli says his vows, he asks her to "not" marry him. They vow to get married in the future, and enjoy their reception with friends and family. In late 2009, Spinelli helps Jason investigate Franco, a mysterious artist.

=== 2010–2016 ===
In early 2010, Spinelli is devastated to find out Maxie slept with Franco, but he tries to forgive her. He creates a fake investigation to have Maxie help him solve, in hopes it will showcase his bravery and remind Maxie of when they first became close. However, they get stuck in a drain pipe and Maxie catches hypothermia. After being saved by Johnny, Maxie is told her heart transplant has been compromised. Spinelli blames himself, and even though she pulls through, their relationship remains strained. After Jason voluntarily goes to prison to protect Michael, Spinelli is despondent. In an attempt to make Spinelli fight for her and get him out of his funk, Maxie pretends to flirt with Matt Hunter. Spinelli finds them kissing, and tells Maxie she is free to be with other people. They officially end their relationship and Maxie begins dating Matt.

Spinelli is ecstatic in early 2011 when Brenda Barrett comes to live with them while Jason protects her from The Balkan, and caters to her every need. He helps to track the international crime lord, and figures out that Suzanne Stanwyck, Brenda's colleague, is The Balkan's wife, and eventually that Theo Hoffman is The Balkan. Spinelli is also of assistance when Brenda's son is kidnapped, and he tracks Suzanne and the child down, facilitating Sonny, Dante Falconeri and Carly Jacks to retrieve him. During the hostage crisis in June 2011 by the crazed Lisa Niles, Spinelli takes a bullet for Maxie. Upon awakening from surgery, he appears to be stuck in his Jackal P.I. persona, a character from The Secret Life of Damian Spinelli, that he had recently written with Diane Miller. Spinelli eventually gets back to his normal self; however does not retain his computer skills. He gains new friends that he contacts through social media, called the Friends of Spinelli (FOS), that help him roam the cyber world for information. He eventually regains his tech-savvy knowledge.

In early 2012, Spinelli moves in with Maxie when she needs a roommate, in hopes of winning her back. Maxie confesses to killing Lisa Niles because she feels guilty about her cousin Robin Scorpio's death. Maxie is sent to prison, and when Spinelli uncovers evidence that proves Matt is the true killer, Maxie urges him to keep her secret. Spinelli reveals the truth and Maxie tells him she will never forgive him. Maxie marries Matt so she won't have to testify against him, but Matt confesses and is sent to prison. Maxie eventually forgives Spinelli and wants to be friends, but Spinelli cuts her out of his life. Spinelli is hired by Olivia Falconeri in June to investigate Heather Webber, leading to Heather's arrest.

He later assists Jason in investigating Sam's presumed dead baby. While doing so, he enlists the help of lab tech Ellie Trout. The two form a connection and start dating. Maxie declares she still loves Spinelli, but he chooses to stay with Ellie. Ellie learns the extent of Maxie and Spinelli's past and chooses to break up with him because she did not want to be his second choice. Spinelli reassured her that she wasn't, and asked her to meet him on the roof of General Hospital during New Year's Eve if they were meant to be together. On her way to meet Spinelli, Ellie gets hit by a car and Spinelli gets drunk, wrongly believing that he had been stood up. Maxie finds him on the roof and takes him home. The two have a one-night stand, but when Spinelli learns of Ellie's injuries, he rushes to her side and they get back together.

Maxie later learns that she is pregnant with Spinelli's child. However, she passes off the child as Lulu and Dante's, whom she had agreed to be the surrogate for, but ended up miscarrying. After Maxie gives birth to a baby girl, Spinelli finds out the truth. He chooses to keep the secret, though, to let Dante and Lulu raise his daughter, whom they name Connie. The truth is revealed at Connie's christening, and Spinelli & Maxie decide they want their daughter back. However, Dante and Lulu also want her, and the four go to court. The judge awards Spinelli sole custody, telling Maxie she is not allowed to see her child for six months. Maxie tries to ignore this court order and see her daughter, but Spinelli turns her away. When Ellie gets a job in Portland, Spinelli moves with her, and takes his daughter, with Maxie's blessing. Before he leaves, they both agree to rename their daughter Georgie, after Maxie's sister.

Spinelli returned almost two years later, after Ellie broke up with him, and decided to try and win Maxie back. However, Maxie was now falling for Nathan West. Maxie broke up with Nathan, and she and Spinelli tentatively started over. After Ellie came back to town, wanting Spinelli back, he and Maxie realized they both were in love with other people, and broke up amicably. Spinelli and Ellie returned to Portland with Georgie. Spinelli makes periodic returns, often to help Jason and Sam uncover information.

=== General Hospital: Night Shift ===
While playing with Jason's gun, Spinelli accidentally shoots himself in the foot. Since Spinelli is not licensed to carry a gun, Jason tells the police he shot Spinelli and is sentenced to community service at the hospital, where Spinelli visits him often. Various plots occur that have later impact on the main series. As a form of thanks for covering for him, Spinelli designs a video game based on Jason, called the "Stone Cold Saga." This is later used by Winnifred Leeds to gain Spinelli's trust while investing him for the FBI. It is also revealed that Spinelli has an immense fear of clowns, which is revisited during the General Hospital carnival in 2009. Another plot point occurs when Spinelli and Jason assist Stacey Sloan by performing a C-section while trapped in an elevator. Stacey dies while her baby lives, starting the chain of events revolving around Robin Scorpio's attempt to adopt the baby and later on the desire to have one of her own.

Also during this time, Spinelli develops a crush on one of the nurses, Jolene Crowell. They have a one-night stand, after which Spinellli finds out that Jason suspects Jolene of being the culprit on the various sabotages around the hospital. Spinelli investigates the matter, wanting to prove Jolene innocent but instead finding her guilty. In the season finale, a shootout occurs at the hospital and Jolene jumps on top of Spinelli to shield him from a bullet, ending up in a coma.

== Book appearances ==
The Secret Life of Damian Spinelli was released on April 5, 2011, coinciding with the series' 48th anniversary on April 1, as well as a similar novel-writing on-screen storyline. Written by fellow costar Carolyn Hennesy, the book reached New York Times Best Seller status. Hennesy is familiar in novel writing, as she had already written six young adult novels at the time of writing Secret Life. On General Hospital, she plays Diane Miller, the high-powered attorney (at the time) of mobsters Sonny Corinthos and Jason Morgan, and is the other main character of the book. Inspired by film noir, the novel centers around Spinelli's storytelling to Diane of his various private investigating escapades with the citizens of Port Charles. Hennesy credits Bradford Anderson as her inspiration, telling MSN TV, "Yes, I wrote the book, but believe me, Bradford is the best inspiration anyone could have. All the credit does go to Bradford, because without Spinelli, there would not be this book."
