= Lorenzo Alcazar =

Fictional character from General Hospital

- General Hospital character
- Portrayed by: Ted King; Jay Pickett (2006; temp.)
- Duration: 2003–2007
- First appearance: June 5, 2003
- Last appearance: May 23, 2007
- Created by: Robert Guza, Jr. and Charles Pratt, Jr.
- Introduced by: Jill Farren Phelps
In-universe information
- Occupation: Mobster; Arms Dealer; C.E.O. of ELQ
- Siblings: Luis Alcazar
- Spouse: Carly Corinthos (2005)
- Children: Diego Alcazar; Lila Rae Alcazar
- Nieces and nephews: Sage Alcazar

Lorenzo Alcazar is a fictional character on the American ABC soap opera General Hospital, originated by actor Ted King, who previously played Lorenzo's deceased brother Luis Alcazar. He was temporarily portrayed by Jay Pickett in 2006.

== Casting ==
After previously playing the role of Luis Alcazar in 2002, King originated the role of brother Lorenzo in June 2003. In 2005, King won Favorite Villain in the 19th annual Soap Opera Digest Awards.

In 2007, King chose not to renew his contract and left the series. In an interview with Carolyn Hinsey, Ted King stated his frustration with the direction of Lorenzo Alcazar on the show, stating "Sonny didn't kill his brother [Luis] or his son [Diego] or his niece [Sage]. He's lost three people, and Sonny didn't kill any of them. Yet he's always angry at Sonny. It doesn't make any sense to me." However, he also expressed he would miss the show, explaining to Soap Opera Digest, "Absolutely! The great thing about what I've been able to do with this character in the last four and a half years, particularly with Lorenzo, was that he's been very three-dimensional."

== Storylines ==
=== 2003–07 ===
Lorenzo Alcazar arrives as a known international arms dealer, an intelligent and powerful man with ties to organized crime and high-ranking government agencies. Prior to joining the family business, he was a history professor at Oxford University. Lorenzo originally entered Oxford as a student of law, until he became involved with an idealistic French woman named Sophie Germaine who was tragically killed. Lorenzo blames himself for what happened to Sophie, and abandoned his life in England to become part of the Alcazar family business.

Lorenzo comes to Port Charles to avenge the death of his older brother, Luis Alcazar (also played by King). He learns Alexis Davis is the person responsible for his brother's death, but does not take revenge on her because she is a civilian. Knowing his brother's presence in Port Charles was due in part to resident mobster Sonny Corinthos, Lorenzo becomes a thorn in Corinthos’ side. He tries to get Sonny's half-brother Ric Lansing to usurp the organization from his brother. Ric kidnaps Carly Corinthos and holds her in a panic room at his house. Alcazar finds out about this and helps Ric conceal Carly. He then holds her hostage himself for weeks as leverage over Sonny. While holding Carly, Lorenzo falls in love with her. Months later, Lorenzo becomes in charge of raising his niece, Sage Alcazar when she moves to town, who is later murdered at the Quartermaine mansion by Mary Bishop.

Carly is shot in the head by her husband Sonny, and suffers severe brain damage. She enters a coma, where she experiences a life with Lorenzo as her husband. When Carly comes out of her coma, she has trouble adjusting to her life. She discovers feelings for Lorenzo, putting a strain on her marriage. When Sonny sees her kissing Lorenzo, he leaves her. They eventually reconcile for sake of their children, but later officially divorce. After her divorce from Sonny, Carly later marries Lorenzo. Carly and Lorenzo suffer marital problems because of her close relationship with Sonny, and eventually divorce.

Meanwhile, Lorenzo finds out he has a son, Diego Alcazar, by former lover Maria Sanchez. He offers Diego a home, and wants to be a part of his son's life. During this time, Lorenzo and Skye Chandler Quartermaine become involved when Lorenzo realized his love for Carly would never be returned. After they spent one night together, she becomes pregnant. Lorenzo tries to sway his son from a life of crime without success. Lorenzo tries to leave organized crime to keep the dangerous lifestyle away from his family. However, when Jason Morgan gets Diego Alcazar arrested, Lorenzo returns to arms dealing in order to use his connections to protect his son from going to prison.

Despite Lorenzo's attempts to protect his son, Diego is apparently killed in 2006 by Sam McCall in a shoot-out between Alcazar's men and Jason Morgan, who was on the run with Sam when Ric and Lorenzo hired Damian Spinelli to frame Sam for a crime she didn't commit. The apparent death of his son left Lorenzo devastated and determined to make sure his new daughter Lila Rae Alcazar would never suffer the same fate as Diego.

After the loss of several shipments, Lorenzo goes to Sonny's office attempting to shoot him. Carly walks in, allowing Sonny enough of a distraction to shoot Lorenzo in the head instead. After his brain injury, Lorenzo fakes amnesia to gain an advantage over his enemies. Sonny, aided by Skye, sends Jason to kill Alcazar on May 23, 2007. Jason goes on trial for the murder. Carly enlists Jerry Jacks to go to Venezuela and fabricate evidence that could exonerate Jason. Jerry calls someone who sounds identical to Lorenzo, who is able to fool the banking officials and get Alcazar's assets released. This, along with doctored photos of Lorenzo indicating he is alive, are enough proof to get Jason found innocent in the murder.

=== Post-mortem ===
In 2008, it is revealed that Diego is still alive and terrorizing Port Charles as the Text Message Killer. Diego's crimes are his way of getting revenge on his father's enemies, and avenging his death. In 2012, both Skye and Carly recognize Lorenzo's face in a picture of Blair Cramer and Tomás Delgado's wedding announcement.
