= Patrick Drake and Robin Scorpio =

Patrick and Robin
- General Hospital character
- Kimberly McCullough and Jason Thompson as Patrick and Robin
- Duration: 2006–16
- Created by: Robert Guza, Jr. and Charles Pratt, Jr.
- Introduced by: Jill Farren Phelps
In-universe information
- Other names: Scrubs
- Family: Scorpio
- Spouse: 2008–14, 2016–
- Children: Emma Drake; Noah Drake

Dr. Patrick Drake and Dr. Robin Scorpio-Drake are fictional characters and a supercouple from the ABC daytime drama General Hospital and its SOAPnet spin-off General Hospital:Night Shift. The couple is commonly referred to by the nickname "Scrubs", rather than by a portmanteau like other supercouples. Robin, the daughter of popular characters Robert Scorpio (Tristan Rogers) and Anna Devane (Finola Hughes), is portrayed by Kimberly McCullough, the original actress cast in the role who has portrayed the character sporadically since she was seven in 1985. Jason Thompson was cast as 1980s character Dr. Noah Drake's (Rick Springfield) son Patrick in December 2005.

After their meeting for the first time and their first few scenes together, the developing couple's relationship became popular among General Hospital fans. After the birth of their daughter, Emma Grace Scorpio Drake, interrupts their first wedding on October 31, 2008 (she is born on-screen November 3), the couple finally weds on December 26, 2008.

== Writing and music ==
Canadian actor Jason Thompson was cast as "dreamy yet arrogant" Dr. Patrick Drake on General Hospital in December 2005. Kimberly McCullough had already been part of the series since 1985 as character Robin Scorpio. The writers detailed Patrick as the brilliant neurosurgeon son of Dr. Noah Drake. By having Patrick fall in love with Robin, the show's most popular heroine and also HIV positive, the series set out to create one of the genre's "most unique and touching love stories". "These are the kids of legacy characters Robert Scorpio and Noah Drake, giants of General Hospital history," said SOAPnet executive vice president and general manager Deborah Blackwell. "She's HIV positive, he's trying to change his ways, and they're in love. It's an incredibly compelling storyline."

With General Hospital:Night Shift, the writers anchored the show around Patrick and Robin and felt that this gave them an advantage on other couples within the series. "It's nice to start with the premise of a love story. Viewers know Robin and Patrick, but haven't seen a ton happen to them just yet. It gives us something to follow and root for right away," stated Jill Farren Phelps. In addition, the pairing would continue to appear on General Hospital.

Executives did not want Night Shift to be "your mother's General Hospital" and outlined Patrick and Robin's love story to involve the various ills and plagues of their patients, portrayed by a variety of guest stars. They felt this would expand the focus from a soap opera's "trademark tangled web" of romance to include the patients and their illnesses. Robin was presented as an accomplished medical professional who has been living with and successfully managing HIV for almost 15 years when she meets Patrick.

"The heart of the show will be about the cases and how they impact our doctors,” said Brian Frons, president of Disney-ABC Television Group. With Patrick and Robin as the show's main romance, the series was designed to tackle "grittier" and more "controversial" subject matter, partly due to daytime standards being different than what writers can do in prime time.

On May 29, 2006, Memorial Day, the series had Patrick and Robin make love for the first time to "Collide" by Howie Day. When the couple exchanged "I love yous", their official song became "Cloud Nine" by Cory Paul.

== Storylines ==
=== 2005–06 ===
Dr. Robin Scorpio returns to Port Charles, New York in October 2005, having left in 1999 and coming back for a brief return in 2004. Samantha McCall (Kelly Monaco) seeks out Robin in New York City where she is giving a conference on drug treatment. Sam desperately asks Robin to help her save her fiancé and Robin's ex-boyfriend, Jason Morgan (Steve Burton). Jason is near death, suffering from brain damage as a result of taking an unknown drug to further his investigation of psychotic psychiatrist, Dr. Thomas. Robin agrees to return to help Jason with her experimental drug treatment. When the treatment fails, Jason is closer to death and in dire need of brain surgery.

Robin went to find Noah Drake and he was too drunk to perform the surgery. He tells her about his son, Dr. Patrick Drake, and says that he could perform the surgery on Jason. Patrick and Robin share their first scenes when she finds him having sex with a nurse in one of the rooms at the hospital he is working at. After hearing all about Jason's case from Robin, Patrick agrees to examine Jason, but does not officially agree to the surgery. Together, Patrick and Robin go back to Port Charles. After reviewing Jason's case, Patrick decides not to do the surgery until Robin challenges him. Proving that he is the "most gifted" doctor, Patrick performs the surgery successfully and Jason recovers.

Patrick decides to continue working at General Hospital, and relocates to Port Charles. Robin also decides to stay in the place she called home for most of her life. The two often disagree on patients' treatments, with Patrick leaning toward more invasive surgeries and Robin wanting to use drug therapies. The opposing physicians quarrel at the hospital on a daily basis. But it is Noah and Patrick's non-existent father/son relationship that helps develop Patrick and Robin's relationship. When he was a teenager, Patrick's mother died during a surgery that Noah was performing. Noah could not forgive himself and turned to alcohol as a result. He became a neglectful father and his relationship with Patrick suffered severely. At the same time, Robin developed her own set of father issues with the re-emergence of a not-so-dead Robert Scorpio. Early on, Robin and Patrick connect because of their dead beat nonexistent fathers. Though her father left shortly after he returned and never fully healed their broken relationship, Robin tried to mend the fence between Patrick and Noah and in a way acted as mediator. Robin and Patrick learn more about each other's pasts and soon Robin is able to convince Patrick to talk to his father. In conversation, Patrick admits his love for his father and inspires Noah to go to rehab.

For most of 2006, Robin has to deal with not only her complicated relationship with Patrick but trying to mend the relationship between herself and her parents. They start a "no-strings sex" agreement. When Patrick and Robin start to get closer, Patrick gets scared and "breaks up" with Robin, stating he does not want an "emotional bond". Eventually, thanks to Noah, Patrick and Robin find their way back to each other. Soon after, tragedy strikes - Patrick, while performing brain surgery on a patient with end stage AIDS, is stuck with an infected needle and might have contracted HIV. During this time, Patrick realizes just how much Robin means to him and just how much of a strong, amazing person she is. Robin stands by Patrick all throughout his ordeal. Patrick blurts out that he loves her and after some road bumps, they properly declare their love for one another in a courtyard in November 2006.

In December, Robin finds an apartment for Patrick. Though reluctant at first, he decides to keep the place. What came next for the twosome has come to be known as "The Couch Chronicles" where Robin bought a leather couch for Patrick (since he was none too eager to buy furniture for himself, and Robin saying she enjoyed that sort of decorating), Patrick taking back the couch (after his friend Pete Marquez scared him believing Robin had ulterior motives), Patrick reordering the couch, Robin insisting he take it back and finally Robin seeing he liked the couch (this and agreeing to move in with him, which was also a source of argument for the two in between the couch fighting). Robin moved in for one day, and by the next Pete was over trying to get Patrick to leave for Vegas to reprogram him. It wasn't until Noah came by offering his congratulations that Patrick felt backed into a corner and left with Pete for Las Vegas. A hurt Robin called on her girlfriends for what she hoped to be a roadtrip but was arrested shortly after when a guy came onto her. Patrick had an unpleasant time in Vegas and called Robin only to find out she had been arrested. After each had a talk with wise Uncle Mac (John J. York), Patrick apologized but Robin was too upset.

Patrick's 6 month HIV tests came back inconclusive at the same time. Robin tried her best to convince him to take it again but Patrick was stubborn and believed this was a bad sign telling him he was positive.

=== 2007–08 ===
In February 2007, Robin is shot in the stomach during a hostage situation at the Metro Court Hotel. Emily Quartermaine (Natalia Livingston), with the assistance of Carly Corinthos (Laura Wright) and Patrick (via telephone), saves Robin's life. While Robin was in peril, Patrick was a wreck. At the culmination of the hostage crisis, Robin's friend, Nikolas Cassadine (Tyler Christopher), carries Robin out of the Metro Court to safety. She undergoes surgery to remove the bullet in her abdomen. At the hospital, Patrick tells her that he thought the worst thing that could happen to him was him testing positive for HIV but he realized that HIV would be a blessing compared to losing her because he loves her "beyond reason". On March 2, 2007, Robin is released from the hospital and brought home to her Uncle Mac's house to recuperate. Patrick's HIV test results come back as an affirmative negative. Both were relieved.

On March 15, 2007, Robin attempts to get her life back to normal and goes to work. But she is told to leave by Dr. Russell Ford, despite Patrick's and Monica's (Leslie Charleson) words of assurance that she will be able to handle being back at work so soon after her surgery. She gives in and leaves the hospital. Later, she is sitting on the pier, thinking, when Patrick shows up. He says that he is looking for her and she replies that she had run out of private thinking spots. Patrick says that he tried the park first and had hoped that she had gone there instead of the pier where there are many stairs. Patrick and Robin make up and discuss "therapy" options. In the end, Patrick carries her home.

On March 26, 2007, Patrick and Robin argue over her decision to not move back into their apartment with him. She then goes over to Wyndemere to see Nikolas and asks if she can stay with him. Nikolas is not home at the time, and as she searches through his desk to find a paper to leave a note, she is stopped by Mr. Craig (Sebastian Roche), the head gunman from the Metro Court hostage crisis, and finds out he is blackmailing Nikolas for a new identity. When Nikolas returns home, he finds Robin tending to Craig's wound and finds out that Craig had decided Robin might be useful in his blackmail plot. Craig instructs Robin to go about her normal life and not to draw attention to herself. Also, she cannot tell anybody, especially Patrick and he makes numerous threats against Patrick to keep her in-line. Robin goes about his instructions and gets into a fight with Patrick. On March 29, 2007, Patrick goes over to Wyndemere and demands that Nikolas tell him what is going on. Nikolas hesitates and Robin walks in. She can see Craig out of the corner of her eye, holding a gun. She fears for Patrick's safety, so she lies to him and tells him they are over. Later, Craig decides that a good cover story for Robin living at Wyndemere will be to have Robin and Nikolas play out a very public love affair. They agree, fearing for their loved ones' lives. At the end of the day, Alexis (Nancy Lee Grahn) walks into Wyndemere, stopping dead in her tracks when she sees Robin and Nikolas in a very delicate position on the couch. The two brush it off as though it is nothing, but Alexis is clearly suspicious. Robin and Patrick are reunited following an almost deadly confrontation with Mr. Craig. Once Nik is in the clear for good, Robin and Patrick go home together.

After a few months of being together, happy and in love, Robin has a pregnancy scare. Although the test is negative, she realizes she wants different things from life than Patrick. She wants more from him (children), while he is happy just the way they are. They eventually break up. Robin wants to be a mother and decides to be a single mom. She and her friend, Dr. Kelly Lee (Minae Noji), put a list of possible sperm donors together. Robin picks people in Port Charles, because she feels that they have redeeming qualities she will like to pass on to her child, and does not like the idea of her child's father being a stranger. On November 30, 2007, Patrick tells Robin that he still loves and misses her. He just wants them to be together again and asks her to table the discussion of children for a year, and while she has stated that she has never been happier than when she was with him, she knows nothing would be different in a year - she would still want kids and he would not, to which he sadly replies that she is probably right, but it would have been a great year.

Robin is devastated by her cousin Georgie's (Lindze Letherman) death in December 2007. After Georgie's funeral and Maxie's (Kirsten Storms) horrible outburst at Felicia (Kristina Wagner), she seeks comfort in Patrick's arms, because he truly knows her and sees her as she truly is, and tells him that it is not about getting back together, or a baby or even sex, but that she just wants him to hold her. Caught in a moment, they end up making love. That night, a condom breaks and Robin becomes pregnant, although she is unaware of this until weeks later. Dr. Kelly Lee tells Robin that the date of conception would have to be sometime around Christmas, which was around the time when Patrick and Robin had sex. Robin, worried that Patrick now has HIV, is about to tell him, but when she walks into the locker room she hears Dr. Julian tell Patrick that the HIV test he took (after he realized that the condom had broken when he and Robin had sex) has come back negative. With the news that Patrick is not infected, Robin makes up her mind not to tell Patrick about the pregnancy just yet. Robin later blurts out to Patrick that she is pregnant, but leaves out the fact that he is the father. She tells him that she went to a sperm bank and that she does not know who her baby's father is. Although he thinks she is having a baby with someone else, Patrick cannot stay away from Robin or her child. After several occurrences, Patrick slowly realizes that he may in fact be the father of her baby. After they have a heart-to-heart, however, Patrick asks about the paternity of the baby. Robin admits he is the father. Even though she is pregnant, Robin cannot let go of the fact that he never wanted children. Arguments and resentment builds from both sides- Patrick wanting to be a part of his child's life, Robin telling him it's her baby that he never wanted. Eventually, being confronted by her past—remembering how wrong she believed Carly was to keep baby Michael's paternity from AJ (Billy Warlock), or even her own mother keeping her away from her father the first 6 years of her life—Patrick and Robin forgive one another and start their relationship up again. Over time, Patrick and Robin grow even closer and Patrick falls even more in love with Robin, and with the child he never wanted.

Robin's mother comes back on a leave from her spy duties to help care for Robin until the birth of her grandchild. Patrick realizes what Robin and this baby truly mean to him and knows that he wants them to be a family in every sense of the word, but Robin still has concerns. Although Robin states that Patrick could see his child as much as he wants, she does not believe he is fully committed or prepared to give up his bachelorhood for a family. He takes her to court and only after his moving testimony does she realize Patrick truly wants this, her and their child, their family. They wait for their baby as a happy, loving committed couple. On August 12, 2008, Patrick and Robin learn their baby is a girl. As Patrick goes into full panicked father mode, Robin tries to calm him down. Later, when Patrick sees Robin with Jason, he expresses his concern that he does not want his child to be around such a dangerous target and Robin agrees.

On August 21, 2008, Robin catches Patrick and Epiphany (Sonya Eddy) in some sort of cahoots against her. She thinks that they are conspiring to convince her to start her maternity leave early. She then goes to meet with a patient, when Patrick gets on the PA system and declares his love for Robin. Robin rushes to the nurses' station where Patrick proposes in front of all of their friends and other loved ones. While everyone is looking at Robin, she becomes so overwhelmed and leaves, leaving Patrick devastated. Patrick follows her to the park, where she is crying. She does not want him to marry her only because she is pregnant with his child, and although he states he wants to marry her for her, she still says no. She tells him that she loves him, but that she cannot marry him, and walks away, leaving Patrick heartbroken.

Patrick continues to try to convince Robin to marry him to no avail. Robin has a health scare and goes into early labor. They manage to stop the labor and Patrick promises to stop pressuring her about getting married.

In true Robin and Patrick fashion, they cannot get on the same page - just when Robin realizes she does want to marry him, Patrick has finally accepted the fact that she does not. Mac arrests Patrick and locks the two of them in the PCPD interrogation room, forcing them to talk. Patrick proposes again and Robin finally says yes. They decide to marry before their daughter is born, and their wedding is set for October 29, 2008. Patrick, thinking he has all the time in the world, decides to go into the hospital to do last minute rounds. He cuts it close, but signs out on time. However, just as he is about to leave, Anthony Zacchara (Bruce Weitz) is brought in with a stroke and needs emergency surgery. Matt (Jason Cook), Patrick's newly found half brother who's also a neurosurgeon, offers to perform it, but Patrick is afraid that should something go wrong the Zaccharas would go after his brother. Meanwhile, back at the church, everyone waits for Patrick's arrival impatiently and believes that he has a case of cold feet and has left his fiancée at the altar. Robin is the only one who has no fears and no doubts and is certain beyond a shadow of a doubt that Patrick will be there. Patrick comes running in after a successful surgery and apologizes for his lateness, but Robin is cool-headed; she knew he would be there. Mac walks her down the aisle, as her father Robert is still getting treatment for his cancer overseas.

Just before their vows are exchanged, Robin's water breaks and she goes into labor. After having a complicated delivery, Robin delivers their daughter, Emma Grace Scorpio-Drake. While there is an HIV scare involving a nick on baby Emma's ear, her tests come back negative. As soon as they receive the good news, Robin falls into a coma and is diagnosed with Disseminated intravascular coagulation (DIC). Robin regains consciousness a couple of days later to see Patrick holding Emma on the foot of the hospital bed. After she regains consciousness, Anna convinces her to keep fighting because Emma needs her mother. Robin & Patrick go home with the baby after she recovers. Once they get home, Robin becomes depressed believing Emma only cries with her. On Thanksgiving, Robin and Patrick set another wedding date for just after Christmas, not wanting their wedding to interfere with their daughter's first Christmas.

=== 2009–12 ===
Robert returns from Switzerland after his colon cancer's gone into remission, right before Christmas. Anna returns from a mission around the same time. This time, Robert walks his daughter down the aisle and Robin asks Anna to be her maid of honor (as opposed to Maxie who had the honors the first time). Patrick asks his brother, Dr. Matt Hunter, to be his best man (in place of Coleman who stood up for him last time). On December 26, the wedding goes off without a hitch. No shootings, no delays, no drama. Just love and romance and happiness.

Unfortunately, Robin unknowingly suffers from postpartum depression (PPD). Robin's behavior becomes increasingly erratic and it takes a long time before Robin acknowledges that she has a problem. She starts seeing a psychiatrist and taking medication. But once she starts feeling better, Robin believes that she's cured and throws away her medication without her doctor's knowledge. Patrick finds out and stages an intervention where Robin's confronted by her doctor, family, and friends. Robin finally admits that she needs more help and leaves home to get treatment at an inpatient facility.

She returns once her treatment's completed and apologizes for what she's put Patrick through. Robin asks him if they can fix their relationship. Patrick assures her that she's the center of their family's life. He says that though what they've gone through is not going to be his favorite chapter of the 'Robin & Patrick saga', there's nothing to fix because what happened was beyond her control. They finally get a chance to really talk. Patrick reassures Robin of how invested he is in their life together. The two say "I love you" to each other and they go home together where Robin reunites with Emma with whom she can now bond. For a while, Robin's so attached to Emma that she actually contemplates not going back to work. Even Maxie notices and comments about how before Robin didn't even want to touch Emma, but now Patrick can't pry the baby out of her hands.

But Robin's hard-earned happiness is interrupted when Patrick and his brother face a malpractice suit in the death of the mayor's mistress, Brianna Hughes, after an emergency surgery. Playing detective, Robin aids Patrick in proving that Brianna was murdered by the mayor's wife.

Robin and Patrick host Thanksgiving dinner for the family at their new house. Though Patrick is initially kept in the dark, Robin plots with Kristina Davis (Lexi Ainsworth) and Molly Lansing (Haley Pullos) to set up their mother, Alexis Davis with Robin's Uncle Mac. Robin tells a skeptical Sam that the two guests of honor had very obvious chemistry at Maxie's "nonwedding" to Damian Spinelli (Bradford Anderson). But Alexis and Mac realize something is afoot and tell the girls it is a waste of time. Matt also attends the dinner, unexpectedly bringing along Dr. Lisa Niles (Brianna Brown), an ex-girlfriend of Patrick's who is town. Patrick gives her a warm hug and Robin, though surprised, tells Lisa she is welcome. Maxie, nursing influenza, misses the family event.

Robin counsels Elizabeth Webber (Rebecca Herbst), who is having a secret affair with Nikolas Cassadine, but is engaged to Lucky Spencer (Jonathan Jackson), to be truthful about how she feels.

In 2009 Patrick's former college girlfriend, Dr. Lisa Niles, comes to town and the two strike up a flirtation; when Robin and Patrick start to have problems Robin begins to pull away from him. A few months later Robin decides to go to Africa despite Patrick's protests. In July 2010 while Robin is in Africa, Patrick gets drunk with Lisa after a successful surgery and the two have a one-night stand; Patrick immediately feels guilty and realizes his love for Robin when she comes home from Africa a few days early. The trouble continues when Carly Corinthos Jacks overhears Patrick and Lisa talking about their one night stand and counsels Patrick to keep it secret from Robin. Matters go from bad to worse when Lisa begins exhibiting strange behavior and even breaks into Patrick and Robin's house and cuts her face out of their wedding picture.

After being kidnapped by Lisa, Robin discovers Patrick's affair with Lisa and leaves him, completely heartbroken. However, when Lisa's obsession with Patrick spirals out of control to the extent where she attempts to murder Robin on several occasions, Robin and Patrick band together for Emma's sake to expose Lisa, and begin taking steps to repair their relationship. After the death of Jake Spencer, Robin apologizes for holding his betrayal against him for so long and asks him to come home so they can be a family again.

On February 21, 2012, Robin Scorpio-Drake died in an explosion at the hospital. Staying true to her medical oath she went into the lab to retrieve the serum for Jason Morgan's protocol. Patrick watched helplessly as the lab exploded with his wife trapped inside. The first person he told was her mother Anna.

On March 26, Patrick received what he thought was Robin's ashes, and he took them to the plot of land that they were going to build their dream home on to say goodbye to Robin. Patrick was having a hard time saying goodbye, and the next scene showed Robin alive and unconscious in a hospital bed in an undisclosed location.

=== 2013–14 ===
Patrick first has a relationship with Dr. Britt Westbourne (Kelly Thiebaud) before pursuing a relationship with Sabrina Santiago (Teresa Castillo). They grow closer and he proposes to her. On Patrick's wedding day to Sabrina, Robin shows up. Emma sees her and they have a big reunion. Eventually, Patrick chooses Robin and they reunite in time to celebrate Christmas as a family with Emma. Robin applies to be the chief of staff, but is overlooked, after Dr. Liesl Obrecht (Kathleen Gati) secures the position, following her own deal with the WSB. Patrick and Robin find out Sabrina's pregnant, but she claims that Patrick is not the baby's father. Sabrina later admits to Patrick that the baby really is his, and Patrick and Robin agree to deal with the situation together. Robin then gets a visit from Victor Cassadine (Thaao Penghlis), who reveals he's the WSB director who arranged Dr. Obrecht's release. He tells Robin he wants her to revive his sister-in-law and nephew, Helena (Constance Towers) and Stavros Cassadine (Robert Kelker-Kelly). After refusing to help Victor, he reveals that he has also been holding Jason, and that Robin could revive him as well, if she helped in resurrecting Helena and Stavros. After meeting Jason's son, Danny Morgan, Robin agrees to help Victor so she can also save Jason. She says goodbye to Mac, Anna, Patrick and Emma and leaves town with Victor.

On August 5, 2014, Patrick runs into Robin at the Crichton-Clark Clinic. He was there with Sam, looking for answers on a former patient, Nina Clay (Michelle Stafford). Robin tells him that she can't leave the clinic. Patrick then sees a cryogenic chamber, and he asks if Jason (Billy Miller) is in there. Robin says that it is Stavros, and that Jason is not there. She tells Patrick that Jason's organs were failing, and he soon died. Patrick then leaves after Robin says her work is more important than her family. Patrick soon files for divorce. It's revealed that Robin lied, and Jason is actually still alive. Victor threatened Robin into keeping quiet by having Rafe Kovich, Jr. (Jimmy Deshler) run Patrick's car off the road while he, Emma, and Sabrina were inside. Sabrina and Patrick's son, Gabriel, died as a result of the accident. Robin agrees to the divorce, despite being heartbroken.

Robin manages to revive Jason, but Victor betrays her, and separates the two of them. However, Jason ends up escaping from his guards, and rescues Robin. The two escape from the clinic, and make their way to Port Charles. The two separate to find help, but Robin ends up getting kidnapped by Helena again. She threatens Robin's family, and forces her to leave again and develop an immortality serum. Robin tells Patrick she's in Paris, and leaves town again.

=== 2015–17 ===
Patrick begins a relationship with Sam, and they get engaged. However, when Jason, Sam's husband, is revealed to be alive, Patrick realizes that he and Sam will not make it, and ends their engagement. Emma is devastated over Sam leaving, and asks for her mother. Patrick calls Robin, now being held hostage by Jerry Jacks after Helena's death. Robin desperately wants to see Emma after hearing her upset, but she's forced to end the call. Emma still demands to see Robin, and Patrick decides takes Emma to Paris to see Robin. However, when he gets there, Robin is nowhere to be found. He calls Robert and Anna for help, and the three make their way to Cassadine Island, where they're able to rescue Robin. The two come back to Port Charles with Emma, and start to heal their relationship after Patrick finds out just how far Robin went to keep her family safe. Eventually, the two of them get job offers in Berkeley, California, and decide to move there. Emma insists that her parents remarry before moving, and they agree. Patrick and Robin remarry with their family present, then leave with Emma to begin their new lives. Robin and Emma make periodic trips back to Port Charles, mostly for special occasions and holidays. During Robin's latest trip back to town, she reveals to her mother that she and Patrick are expecting their second child. In July 2017, Patrick and Robin welcomed a son, Noah Robert Scorpio-Drake, named after his grandfathers Noah Drake and Robert Scorpio.

== Reception and impact ==
Patrick and Robin became one of daytime's most popular pairings within a year of their debut. In 2007, TV Guide named them one of soap opera's best supercouples. Los Angeles Times described them as "one of the mother ship's hottest new couples".

In early 2007, with daytime soap operas "in peril" and "in need" of rescuing, SOAPnet, a Disney-owned cable channel, embarked on "a mission to revive the genre in the evening hours". Their goal was to lure new fans, as well as old, and increase the ratings and interest for daytime dramas. General Hospital: Night Shift, a spinoff of General Hospital, was launched to achieve this, with Patrick and Robin as their primary characters and love story." "The show is being described as an episodic medical-mystery drama – think equal parts General Hospital and House," relayed Los Angeles Times. The move was considered "risky" by the network, but worth the risk. "We’re hoping to attract not just lapsed fans but viewers who aren't hooked on a soap yet," said Jill Farren Phelps, executive producer of the series and 20-year veteran producer. Of the decision to have the series focus on Patrick and Robin's romance, Ed Martin of the Jack Myers Report stated, "...it's a real treat to see two characters of such historical importance to General Hospital be allowed to grow."

Daniel R. Coleridge, former TV Guide columnist and author of The Q Guide to Soap Operas, said that power pairs like Patrick and Robin are precisely what is missing from the daytime genre. "What soaps lack isn't slapping or catfights. It's romance," he said. "Soaps are really devoid of good romance. There are no supercouples anymore."

In October 2008, Soaps In Depth named Patrick and Robin one of soap opera's 100 greatest couples. In December 2008, soap opera website Daytime Confidential named Patrick and Robin the #1 couple for 2008. Also, soapoperasource named them "Best Couple of 2008" and SOAPnet named their wedding as "Best GH Wedding" of 2008.

On Tuesday October 12, 2010, David Letterman named Patrick as #9 on President Barack Obama's Top Ten Enemies List for his affair with Lisa Niles.

== See also ==
- List of supercouples
