= Steven Webber =

Fictional character from General Hospital

- General Hospital character
- Scott Reeves as Steven Webber
- Portrayed by: Robert Beitzel (1977); Martin Hewitt (1979–1981); Shaun Benson (2004–2005); Scott Reeves (2009–2024)
- Duration: 1977–1981; 2004–2005; 2009–2013; 2024
- First appearance: July 11, 1977
- Last appearance: October 28, 2024
- Created by: Douglas Marland
- Introduced by: Gloria Monty (1977); Jill Farren Phelps (2004, 2009); Frank Valentini (2024)
In-universe information
- Other names: Peter Taylor "PJ" Jr. (adoptive name); Steven Lars
- Occupation: Doctor of Emergency Medicine at General Hospital; Chief of Staff at General Hospital; Pediatrician at General Hospital; Former Specialist in forensic medicine
- Family: Hardy; Webber
- Parents: Jeff Webber; Heather Webber
- Stepmother: Carolyn Webber
- Half-brothers: Franco Baldwin
- Half-sisters: Sarah Webber; Elizabeth Webber; Hayden Barnes; Esme Prince
- Grandparents: Steve Hardy; Helene Webber; Audrey Hardy; Alice Grant
- Aunts and uncles: Terri Arnett; Rick Webber; Tom Hardy (adoptive)
- Nieces and nephews: Cameron Webber; Jake Webber; Aiden Spencer; Violet Finn; Ace Prince-Cassadine
- First cousins: Laura Webber (adoptive); Mike Webber (adoptive); Rick Webber Jr. Tommy Hardy (adoptive); Susan Moore

Steven Webber is a fictional character from the American ABC soap opera, General Hospital. Steve was born in 1977, the character has appeared briefly in three different storylines, played each time by a different actor. As an infant in the late 1970s, the character was portrayed by Martin Hewitt. From 2004 to 2005, the character was portrayed as an adult by Shaun Benson. In late 2009, Scott Reeves was cast in the role, with Steve initially on recurring status as the head of the ER trauma unit at General Hospital. In February 2010, Reeves' status was upgraded to contract. Reeves appeared from December 9, 2009 to March 5, 2013. Reeves reprised the role when Steven returned from October 24 to October 28, 2024.

== Storylines ==
=== Background ===
Steven Lars Webber was born to Jeff Webber and Heather Grant. His paternal grandfather is General Hospital's former chief of staff and one of the show's original characters, Steve Hardy. He was named after Steve Hardy and Lars Webber. When Steven was conceived in 1976, Jeff was a newlywed, married to Monica Bard, who was having an affair with Jeff's brother Rick Webber. Jeff then had an affair with Heather, a scheming nanny, though when Heather became pregnant, Jeff told her to get an abortion, since he wanted to stay with his wife Monica. Heather gives birth to Steven Lars on July 11, 1977 and complications immediately follow. Shortly after, Heather sells the baby to Peter Taylor and his wife Diana Taylor for $10,000, though she told Jeff that the baby had died. Later, when Monica divorced Jeff, he married Heather in 1978, still not knowing about the child. The relationship was strained when Heather got a job as her own child's nanny—the child was now going by the name Peter Taylor, Jr. In the winter of 1979, Heather became obsessed with seeing her son. She had planned to put LSD in the adoptive mother, Diana Taylor's, drink to make her go insane, but little Peter accidentally swapped the glasses, and Heather lost her own mind. Jeff was forced to institutionalize her.

After Peter Taylor Sr. died, Diana learned the truth about Steven while going through her husband's effects, finding a note which said, "PJ is Steven Lars". Afraid to lose her child, she tried to woo Jeff, though at the time he was interested in Anne Logan, a nurse who was Audrey Hardy's niece. He still did not know the child was his, until 1981 when Diana finally told him. Diana and Heather continued to compete for Jeff's attention, and plotting to kill each other to remove a rival. A scuffle ensued, and Diana was accidentally killed by Heather's mother, Alice Grant, though Heather tried to frame Anne for the murder. Jeff then took his infant son (renamed from Peter Taylor Jr. to Steven Lars Webber) and left town, to keep him safe from Heather's plotting. Off-screen, Jeff divorced Heather, married again to a woman later identified as "Carolyn", and had two more daughters, Elizabeth Webber and Sarah Webber, who grew up in Boulder, Colorado but in 1997 were sent back to Port Charles as teenagers to live with their "grandmother" Audrey Hardy, until Sarah too left the show, going to live with her father.

=== 2004–2005, 2009–2013 ===
Now older, Steven returns to Port Charles. He was working for attorney John Durant to get to John's biological daughter Carly Corinthos. It was around the same time when his natural mother Heather came back as well, but other than several unplanned meetings, Steven had nothing to do with her. Steven briefly disappears from the show after A. J. Quartermaine's murder, before reappearing as Steve Webber in 2009, invited by his father’s first wife Monica Quartermaine to be the acting chief of staff at General Hospital, so she could return to being a full-time cardiologist. He reveals during the intervening years, he had been running a trauma unit down in Memphis.

Steve becomes good friends with his fellow doctors, Robin Scorpio, her husband Patrick Drake, and Lisa Niles. When Dante Falconeri is brought to the hospital with a gunshot wound, Steve and Lisa help operate. Dante flatlines. Luckily, Steve revives him. Patrick is a little jealous. Steve and Lisa go to a Tim McGraw concert together when they discover they both like his music. Lisa wonders why such a decent guy like him isn't with anyone. He opens up to her about his girlfriend who he was planning on marrying. The day before the proposal, his girlfriend reveals she and his best friend are getting married. Lisa and Steve then make another date. Steve notices Patrick is jealous over his relationship with Lisa, though he denies it. Eventually, Steve discovers Patrick and Lisa slept together and breaks things off with her.

Steve and Cameron were involved in the ski resort bus crash that took place during late December 2010 to early January 2011. He and Cameron both survived as did others, except for the bus driver and Ali, a good friend of Kristina Corinthos-Davis.

In May 2011, Lisa, whom Patrick and Robin have been harassed by for months, is finally outed as the deranged woman she is and arrested, but escapes from Shadybrook a week later. When Steve finds out, he immediately blames himself. He states none of these events would have happened if he had just fired Lisa months ago, especially since Patrick and Robin had come to him repeatedly and told him what Lisa was trying to do to Robin.

During the hospital lock down in 2010, Olivia Falconeri helps Steve to save the life of Ethan Lovett after he gets shot. During the next few months, Steve and Olivia grow closer, and begin to flirt with each other. Steve and Olivia are also both chaperones on the General Hospital ski trip, but when their bus hits black ice, and goes off the road, Steve must help the injured citizens of Port Charles. Olivia is one of the most seriously injured, she suffered from internal bleeding. Steve helps to keep Olivia awake, until an emergency helicopter arrives, to take Olivia to General Hospital to be rushed into emergency surgery. Olivia thanks Steve for saving her life on the mountain, and Steve ends up taking Olivia home from the hospital.

Steve and Olivia continue to grow closer, and eventually make love on May 4, 2011.

In July, Steve stated that when he was 13, his grandfather told him to never show up empty-handed when taking a girl out.

On October 20, 2011, Elizabeth tells Matt that while Steve was in Memphis, he was involved with this girl and he even proposed; however, it later turned "messy".

In November 2011, a new doctor, Maggie Wurth, comes to General Hospital and it is revealed that she was the girl Steven proposed to. When she first shows up in town, she is dressed as a clown, wearing a mask and lurking around the hospital. We see her spying on Steve, and others while in disguise. It is later revealed that in Memphis, Steve killed a prisoner, who was his patient, when Maggie came to him needed the prisoner's heart to save a little girl she was treating. Olivia is originally suspicious of Maggie, and assumes she is still hung up on Steve; but Steve assures there that she has nothing to worry about.

In early 2012, Steve's mother, Heather Webber, is released from Ferncliff under Steve's watch. She eventually creates a lot of trouble for Steve, getting in several situations, that Steve has to get her out of. This later causes problems for him and Olivia.

Johnny Zacchara later finds out about the patient Steve killed, and blackmailed him into helping Johnny sell organs on the black market. After a while, Steve refuses, and Johnny calls the Memphis police and they arrest Steve. Dante travels to Memphis to help Steve, but he isn't released until Heather kills Maggie Wurth, and makes it look like Maggie killed herself, and was responsible for the patient in Memphis.

As soon as Heather gets released from Ferncliff, Olivia is suspicious of her, and continually tries to warn Steve about his mother. Steve believes that Heather is cured, and says he wants to believe the best of her. When Heather steals Olivia's car and disappears in the middle of the night, Olivia decides to hire Damian Spinelli, a private investigator, to look into Heather's actions. Heather continues to lie about everything she's done, and eventually Olivia goes to her son, Detective Dante Falconeri to help investigate Heather. When Steve finds this out, he's angry that Olivia went behind his back, and tells her that he thinks they should take a break from their relationship. Olivia tells Steve she loves him, and he confesses his love for her too, but can't let go of his loyalty to his mother. When Heather injects Olivia with LSD, sending her into hallucinations, and causing her to hold a knife to her throat, Steve is by her side, and promises to send Heather back to Ferncliff, where she will not hurt Olivia again. He is able to talk Olivia down from killing herself, and supports her while she deals with the side-effects from being injected. He also finds out about the numerous crimes Heather has committed. Heather is sent to Ferncliff, but not before Steve tells her he does not want anything to do with her.

Olivia starts having hallucinations that end up coming true. Eventually, Steve started to give her hallucinations more credit when they involve his mother. During the water poisoning scare in Port Charles, Steve received a call from Heather, saying she was worried about him, but Steve coldly rejected her. Afterwards, he finds out Heather escaped from Ferncliff. He's later approached by Jason Morgan, who tells him that Heather switched his wife, Sam's son with a stillborn infant. Steve is horrified by what his mother has done, and when Jason says he doesn't know where the other baby came from, Steve reveals he treated Téa Delgado and her newborn son the same night Sam gave birth. Jason eventually gets proof that Téa Delgado's "son" is Sam's baby, and tells Steve this. However, he also reveals that Heather has kidnapped the baby after posing as his nanny. After Jason leaves, Heather shows up, trying to make a new start with Steve and the baby, but Steve deceives her and tries to call the cops. Heather hits him over the head and escapes, and he's found by Olivia.

Olivia takes Steve to the hospital. Meanwhile, the police get a lead that Heather is in Port Charles, and try to track her down. However, Heather makes her way to the hospital to steal medication for the baby. Olivia finds her in the stairwell, and when she tries to grab the baby, Heather pushes her down the stairs. Steve finds Olivia and gets her help. Meanwhile, Heather goes to the roof with the baby, where she's cornered by Jason and Sam. Steve is about to go to the roof, when Dante comes and tells him that his mother fell from the roof and is severely injured. Steve goes out to help, but Elizabeth holds him back. Eventually, Heather ends up in a coma after surgery. While Heather is in the hospital, Steve monitors her. When he comes with Olivia, she freaks out when she sees Heather standing in front of her, but Steve stops her, because it's actually Todd Manning, Heather's former employer. Todd drops off Heather's belongings to Steve, and among them, Steve finds the paternity test for Sam Morgan's child, saying that Jason is the father of her baby, not Franco, and realizes Heather switched Sam's paternity test. He drops off the results to Sam. Meanwhile, it is revealed that Steve helped Monica fake her son, A.J. Quartermaine's, death. In early 2013, Steve proposes to his girlfriend of two years Olivia, and the two become engaged. On February 14, Heather is presumed dead after being choked and thrown into the harbor. On February 26, 2013, Heather is revealed alive. She attempts to kill Olivia with a knife. Steve rushes in, and Olivia's arm is slit open by Heather. Heather is about to stab Olivia, when Steve throws himself in between the two of them, saving his fiancée's life. Olivia calls an ambulance, and Heather flees. On February 27, Olivia tells Elizabeth and A.J. that Steve had been stabbed. Heather turns herself in. Steve comes out of surgery and speaks with Olivia and Elizabeth. Olivia is elated that Steve survived, so she quickly tasks Maxie with planning a wedding overnight. The wedding takes place on March 1, 2013. On March 5, 2013, Steve calls off his wedding to Olivia, because he is being sent to prison in Memphis.

== Reception ==
In 2023, Mala Bhattacharjee from Soaps She Knows commented that the soap show "barely remembers" that Steven "exists".

== See also ==
- Hardy/Webber family
