= Lisa Niles =

Fictional character from General Hospital

- General Hospital character
- Brianna Brown as Lisa Niles
- Portrayed by: Julie Mond (2009); Brianna Brown (2010–2011)
- Duration: 2009–2011
- First appearance: November 18, 2009
- Last appearance: October 31, 2011
- Created by: Robert Guza, Jr.
- Introduced by: Jill Farren Phelps
- Julie Mond as Lisa Niles
In-universe information
- Occupation: Orthopedic surgeon

Lisa Niles is a fictional character from the ABC soap opera General Hospital. The character first appeared in November 2009 portrayed by actress, Julie Mond. Mond was replaced by Brianna Brown in early 2010. Brown last appeared in the role in October 2011. The character is known for being a villain to popular characters Patrick Drake and Robin Scorpio.

== Casting ==
It was announced in October, 2009 daytime newcomer, Julie Mond, was cast in the role of Lisa Niles, the ex-girlfriend of Patrick Drake. Mond first appeared on November 18, 2009. In December of that year, it was announced Mond was let go from the series as the character would be taken in a new direction, and her storyline would be altered. She was replaced by Brianna Brown, who first appeared in the role on January 6, 2010. Brown said of how she got the role, "I was very fortunate. I didn't have to audition. I was offered the role because of previous work that I'd done and because I was up for a role on Guiding Light long ago. I ended up not taking it at that time but ironically it was the same casting director — Mark Teschner. When my representation told Mark I was interested in being on a soap, Mark got really excited because he knew me from ages ago. He showed the reel on my website to the executive producer Jill Farren Phelps and to the head writer Bob and they really liked what I had done. We sat down, had a meeting to discuss the character and they gave me the role in the room! It was an ideal [situation]!"

In June 2011, it was announced that under new head writer Garin Wolf, Brown would depart from the series. However, Brown started reappearing on a regular basis in September of that year. In October 2011, it was revealed Lisa would be killed off, as the start of a whodunit storyline on the series. This resulted in Brown last appearing on October 31, 2011.

== Development ==
Lisa Niles was introduced in late 2009 as the former girlfriend of Patrick Drake. Her storyline originally consisted of causing tension between Patrick and his wife Robin. This slowly evolved into Lisa seducing Patrick, which received the attention of several media outlets, including TV Guide. Head writer at the time, Robert Guza said of the direction the storyline was going in, "Lisa is going to get very obsessive with Patrick and we will go into a Fatal Attraction story. This is not a Glenn Close sort of thing. Lisa is not a psycho. She won't be boiling bunnies. But that's not to say she won't be acting out in a big way. Lisa was never able to emotionally let go of that connection she had with Patrick back in school. When that is resurrected for one night—and Patrick says it can never happen again—she tries very hard to accept that. And she fails. Miserably. We have a good long way to go with this story—in fact, we might easily get another year out of it. Patrick's refusal to continue [having sex] is not what sets Lisa off. Rather, there's a very small psychological event that will happen some weeks later. It gets her very perturbed.” Brown said about her character breaking up one of the show's most popular couples, " I was warned right away that it was a major relationship that my character would be breaking up. And I was forewarned: 'People are going to hate you'." She also said of the opportunity to play Lisa as more of a villain, "But when I originally signed on, what I was so excited about and why I decided to take the role in the first place was because it was a Fatal Attraction storyline. So I loved the idea of getting to play that. I loved the idea of getting to play a villain because I normally don't get cast as a villain. It's been so much fun. Jumping in front of cars and then blaming someone else for it and drugging people. Who gets to play that? It's so out there!" Brown also said of playing a character that is loose in morals, “I don't want to say she doesn't have a conscience, but she bends the rules.”

Lisa's death in October 2011 marked the beginning of a high-profile mystery storyline. The investigation of murder gave viewers a chance to try the solve the crime along with the police, and determine which of the several suspects was the real murderer. Jill Farren Phelps said of the plot line, "This is Lisa's worst, most insidious plan yet. And it ends very badly for her. Lisa's death—apparently by blunt-force trauma—will leave every one of the passengers looking guilty. Each of them ends up having the motive, the means and the opportunity to kill her. It's a very cleverly told mystery."

== Storylines ==
Dr. Lisa Niles is first introduced as the former college girlfriend of Patrick Drake. She arrives in November 2009, seeking help with a patient from Patrick's wife Robin Scorpio. She is soon hired onto the staff at General Hospital. She takes a brief interest in Matt Hunter, Patrick's brother. When Robin leaves town to take her daughter Emma to visit her mother, Anna Devane in London, Patrick helps Lisa move into her new apartment. Spending time with Patrick brings back old feelings, which at first she is subtle about and continues to act friendly towards Robin. Lisa later begins dating Steven Webber, which causes Patrick to act out in jealousy on a few occasions.

Lisa has a one-night stand with Patrick while Robin is in Africa. Afterwards she continues to try to seduce Patrick again. Patrick and Lisa talk and Lisa agrees to back off. However, Lisa's obsession with Patrick starts to become more obvious. Robin finds defaced pictures of herself and believes Lisa did it. In August 2010, Lisa breaks into Robin and Patrick's house and steals Robin's HIV medicine. Lisa takes Emma on an unannounced ice cream trip, which scares the couple so much that Patrick confesses his affair with Lisa to Robin. Enraged, Robin leaves him. Lisa continues her efforts to prevent their reconciliation, and to deface Robin's character. Trying to convince the hospital staff that Robin is the unstable one, Lisa leaps in front of Robin's car to fake a hit-and-run. Soon after, she leaves Emma's toy rabbit in a boiling hospital bunsen burner for Robin to see. Perceiving this message as a threat to her child, Robin punches Lisa at the hospital, which prompts her suspension.

Although still separated, Robin and Patrick concoct a scheme to make their break-up seem even more volatile in hopes this will lower Lisa's guard and Patrick will be able to coax a confession out of her. Soon Lisa secretly catches on. She replaces Robin's HIV medication with tranquilizers, then takes her to an isolated cabin after she passes out. Robin attempts to flee the cabin in her drugged state, but winds up falling down an old well outside. Mac interrogates Lisa but when nothing incriminating is found, Mac directs his suspicion towards Patrick and arrests him. After he's released, Patrick tracks down Robin and rescues her. Immediately after, Lisa confronts them and threatens suicide with a handgun. Patrick stops her and she is sent to a mental institution. However, she is released soon after, having passed psychiatric evaluations.

Lisa resumes her efforts to get Patrick to sleep with her again. Meanwhile, she saves Robin and Emma from a fire, and Robin claims Lisa set the fire in the first place. While Robin is recovering, Lisa files a petition to have her fired from the hospital. However, while attempting to inject sodium pentothol into Robin's IV bag, Maxie catches her. Lisa runs out of the room and gives Johnny Zacchara the syringe. When the cops arrive, they find no proof, but Steve puts her on probation and the hearing to fire Robin is canceled. Soon, Johnny begins blackmailing Lisa with the syringe to get private medical attention. They eventually start a sexual relationship, but Lisa keeps her eyes on Patrick.

Eventually, Johnny sets up a treasure hunt, leaving several clues for Lisa and Robin to find the syringe. Robin finds it first, and Lisa is close behind her. They both rush to the hospital at the same time that Jake Spencer is hit by a car and dies. In the aftermath, Robin is faced with a sense of what is important and reconciles with Patrick while forgetting about the syringe. Lisa takes advantage of Robin's distraction to steal the syringe and dispose of it. In March 2011, Lisa begins another revenge plot. She befriends Kristina Davis, Emma's new babysitter and gives her hydrocodone pills, which she passes off as herbal supplements. While Kristina is passed out babysitting, Lisa bugs the house, steals Patrick's credit card to make romantic purchases with, and takes pictures of their basement while researching home gas leaks.

Ethan Lovett recognizes Kristina's pills as hydrocodone and informs Johnny, who warns Patrick. Lisa seemingly causes a gas leak and locks Robin in the basement, planning to frame Patrick for the murder. Lisa goes to check Robin's body, only to find her alive, when Mac and Patrick arrive. Mac arrests Lisa for attempted murder and it is revealed that Robin and Patrick were onto the plan and staged the set up. Patrick turned off the gas from outside while Robin recorded all of Lisa's threats and confessions on her cell phone. At the police station, Lisa begs Johnny for help, but he refuses. In May, Patrick visits Lisa in Shadybrook, where she gets under his skin by declaring he will never be truly happy with Robin. Subsequently, Lisa escapes from Shadybrook while in the midst of being moved to another facility.

Lisa begs Johnny for help, and although he eventually agrees, his father, Anthony Zacchara, secretly convinces Lisa to continue with her revenge plans, offering to help. In June, Lisa invades General Hospital with a loaded gun takes Robin, Maxie, Patrick, and Steve hostage. She proceeds to put them through a mock trial outlining their poor treatment of her. Damian Spinelli breaks into the conference room right before she tries to shoot Maxie. When Maxie continues to back talk to her, Lisa pulls the trigger but Spinelli jumps in and takes the bullet. Lisa refuses to allow the doctors to aid Spinelli as she continues the mock trial. Jason and Dante finally override the lockdown and seemingly knock Lisa unconscious. As everyone scrambles to rush Spinelli to an operating room, Lisa recovers and holds a syringe full of drain cleaner to Robin's throat. Patrick attempts to talk Lisa down and then grabs her. In the ensuing struggle, Lisa accidentally sticks herself with the syringe and slips into a coma, with the doctors uncertain if she will ever come out of it.

On September 15, 2011, Anthony is seen with a woman, who is lying in a hospital bed, and next to her on the table is a patient's folder with the name "Lisa Niles" and an ID number on it. Anthony is seen again in Lisa's room on September 22, 2011, talking to a doctor, discussing a drug. Lisa is shown in bed with a respirator, and Anthony tells the doctor to "shoot her up". On September 23, Lisa is seen opening her eyes and awakening from her comatose state. In early-mid October, Lisa stabs Anthony with a nail, knocks out an Unnamed Nurse at GH/First Mate Briggs on the yacht, injects Johnny with an unknown substance, chloroforms: Elizabeth (also threw her overboard), Patrick and Robin. Lisa tries to inject Robins blood into Patrick, but Robin got loose and stops her. Later, Lisa and Robin fight again on the deck, Lisa pushes Robin into some stairs where she loses consciousness. Robin wakes up and Lisa has disappeared.

Days later, Lisa's body is found floating in the harbor by Carly and Shawn. Maxie confesses to killing Lisa in March 2012 to punish herself for accidentally causing Robin's death. In May 2012, Lisa's true killer is revealed to be Matt, and he is sent to prison.

== Reception ==
Initially, the character was not well received by fans of the series, as she was seen as a threat to fan favorite couple, Patrick Drake and Robin Scorpio. The Hollywood Reporter noted how Lisa started a "fan frenzy", as a result of the storyline. As the character's arc began to progress, Brown received much acclaim as Lisa began to be shown as more of a villain. The rivalry between Lisa and Robin also received critical praise, especially after Lisa and Patrick slept together. Yahoo! honored Lisa's departure from the series by featuring Lisa greatest moments, including kidnapping Emma Drake, shooting Damian Spinelli, and overtaking the party boat. The author of the feature, Alan Donahue said of her in comparison to General Hospital's other antagonists, "Starring alongside other villains like Franco and Anthony Zacchara, Lisa may have proved she is the craziest of all." SoapNet named the storyline as one of the best "Fatal Attraction" daytime storylines, noting "Ever since bedding her ex, Patrick, Lisa has had eyes for the handsome Dr. Drake -- and death glares for his wife, Robin. Lisa's determined to get Robin out of the picture -- it seems by any means possible." Sara A. Bibel of Xfinity was complimentary of the plot line in which Lisa enlists her ex-boyfriend Terrell Jackson to seduce Robin away from Patrick, comparing it to fan favorite storylines of the mid 1990s.

The storyline was subject to some controversy in October, 2011, when Lisa attempted to inject Patrick with Robin's blood, thus injecting him with the HIV virus, which Robin has lived with for years. Several critics found it tasteless of the series to use HIV as a weapon, and thought it was contradictory of the positive portrayal of Robin living a healthy life with the virus for several years.
