= Scarlett Fernandez =

American actress

- Born: August 4, 2009 (age 17); Southern California, USA
- Occupation: Actress
- Years active: 2015–present

Scarlett Fernandez is an American actress. She is best known for playing Charlotte Cassadine in the soap opera General Hospital.

== Early life ==
Fernandez was born on August 4, 2009 in Southern California. She lives in Idaho with her parents and was a champion high school volleyball player.

== Career ==
Early on in her career, she appeared in Jane the Virgin, Shameless, American Housewife and Avatar: The Way of Water. Her first big role came playing Charlotte Cassadine in the soap opera General Hospital. In 2021, Fernandez left the soap for the first time and the role was recast to Amelie McClain. Fernandez then appeared in shows such as Lethal Weapon and American Horror Story, before returning to General Hospital as Charlotte in 2023. In September 2025, it was reported that Fernandez would be leaving the soap again later that year, and the character was recast to Bluesy Burke.

== Personal life ==
In her spare time she loves to play volleyball and hopes to play it professionally. She made a new Instagram page dedicated to her volleyball career.

== Filmography ==
=== Film ===
Year	Title	Role	Notes
2015	Studio City	Young Cat	
2016	Broken	Young Jules	
2018	Silver Lake	Charlotte	
2020	Nanny's Killer Scandal	Gwenny	
2022	Avatar: The Way of Water	Young Kiri	

=== Television ===
Year	Title	Role	Notes
2017	Jane the Virgin	Kid	Episode; Chapter Fifty-Five
2017	Lethal Weapon	Kate	Episode; Fools Rush In
2018	Shameless	Jeni	Episode; The Fugees
2018	American Horror Story	Angela	Episode; Return to Murder House
2019	American Housewife	Maddy	2 episodes
2021	Shameless Hall Of Shame	Jeni	Episode; Frank: Ghosts of Gallagher Past
2016–2021, 2023–2025	General Hospital	Charlotte Cassadine	202 episodes
