= Jason Thompson (actor) =

Canadian actor (born 1976)

- Born: Jason Craig Thompson; November 20, 1976 (age 49); St. Albert, Alberta, Canada
- Occupation: Actor
- Years active: 2000–present
- Spouse: Paloma Jonas (m. 2015)
- Children: 2

Jason Craig Thompson (born November 20, 1976) is a Canadian actor. He joined the cast of the American daytime drama General Hospital in December 2005 as neurosurgeon Dr. Patrick Drake. In 2007, Thompson became an original cast member of the General Hospital prime-time spin-off General Hospital: Night Shift while maintaining his day job on GH. On April 1, 2015, Thompson also portrayed original GH character Steve Hardy in a flashback for the show's 52nd anniversary. He has portrayed Billy Abbott on the CBS soap opera The Young and the Restless since 2016.

== Early career ==
He was discovered at 16 working at a restaurant in Edmonton, Alberta by model scout Kelly Streit of mode models. At 18 years old, Thompson left home to build a career in runway, print and commercial modeling. One of his most well-known ad campaigns are the three TV commercials for Gap he did with director Pedro Romhanyi in 1999: "Everybody in Cords", "Everybody in Leather" and "Everybody in Vests". Though modeling paid the bills and allowed Jason the opportunity to travel extensively, he admits that becoming an actor was never far from his thoughts.

Within a few years of committing to an acting career, Thompson amassed various television, film and theatre credits. He has had lead roles in such plays such as The Academy, More Than You and Jakob. In film, Thompson had starring roles in Wishmaster: The Prophecy Fulfilled and Divide.

In television, Thompson has landed guest roles on shows like Felicity, Flipper, and Castle.

== Daytime career ==
Thompson's most popular role to date is that of Dr. Patrick Drake on the ABC soap opera General Hospital. Since playboy Patrick Drake's first appearance on the show, he has flirted with various women (many who work at the hospital call him Dr. Hottie in reference to his good looks and as a tribute to fellow ABC hot doc Grey's Anatomy character Dr. McDreamy), saved many lives, and mended a contentious relationship with his father, Dr. Noah Drake (played by returning castmember Rick Springfield). In one storyline, Patrick donated a part of his liver to save his father's life. At the same time, Patrick began falling for his co-worker and friend, the HIV-positive Dr. Robin Scorpio, which brought up the question of whether Patrick could give up his womanizing ways. In July 2006, through an operating room mishap, Patrick was exposed to HIV, though his HIV test returned a negative result. After much resistance on Robin's part, Robin and Patrick were finally married and welcomed their baby girl, Emma Grace Scorpio-Drake.

As part of ABC's Fan February promotions in 2007, Thompson switched places with a first-grade teacher for a day and taught her class in Irving, Texas. In October 2015, Thompson confirmed his exit from General Hospital. He last appeared on January 7, 2016.

In December 2015, it was announced that Thompson would join The Young and the Restless as Billy Abbott; he first appeared on January 14, 2016.

== Personal life ==
On April 5, 2015, Thompson married his longtime girlfriend, Paloma Jonas, in San Pancho, Mexico. Their first child, a son, was born on May 23, 2016, followed by a daughter on September 20, 2017.

== Awards and nominations ==
List of acting awards and nominations
Year	Award	Category	Title	Result	Ref.
2011	Daytime Emmy Award	Outstanding Supporting Actor in a Drama Series	General Hospital	Nominated	
2012	Daytime Emmy Award	Outstanding Supporting Actor in a Drama Series	General Hospital	Nominated	
2013	Daytime Emmy Award	Outstanding Lead Actor in a Drama Series	General Hospital	Nominated	
2014	Daytime Emmy Award	Outstanding Lead Actor in a Drama Series	General Hospital	Nominated	
2015	Daytime Emmy Award	Outstanding Lead Actor in a Drama Series	General Hospital	Nominated	
2020	Daytime Emmy Award	Outstanding Lead Actor in a Drama Series	The Young and the Restless	Won	
2021	Soap Awards France	Best International Actor	The Young and the Restless	Nominated	
2022	Daytime Emmy Award	Outstanding Lead Actor in a Drama Series	The Young and the Restless	Nominated	
2023	Daytime Emmy Award	Outstanding Lead Actor in a Drama Series	The Young and the Restless	Nominated	

Preceded by Burgess Jenkins	Billy Abbott (role); 2016–present	Incumbent
