= List of children of General Hospital =

General Hospital is an American television serial drama, airing on ABC. The show was created by Frank and Doris Hursley, who originally set it in a general hospital in an unnamed fictional city. The series premiered on April 1, 1963. In the 1970s, the city was named Port Charles, New York.

== Present characters ==
=== Scout Cain ===
Scout Cain
- General Hospital character
- Portrayed by: Lori and Sevan Andonian (2017); Palmer and Poe Parker (2017–2019); Ella Ramacieri (2019–2021); Cosette Abinante (2022–2026); Reagan Park (2026); Kayden Brenna Tokarski (2026)
- Duration: 2017–present
- First appearance: February 28, 2017
- Created by: Shelly Altman and Jean Passanante
- Introduced by: Frank Valentini
In-universe information
- Family: Cassadine; Quartermaine
- Father: Drew Cain
- Mother: Sam McCall
- Stepmother: Ava Jerome
- Half-brothers: Oscar Nero; Danny Morgan
- Half-sisters: Lila McCall
- Grandfathers: Alan Quartermaine; Julian Jerome; Cody McCall (illegal)
- Grandmothers: Susan Moore; Monica Quartermaine (adoptive); Betsy Frank (foster); Alexis Davis; Evelyn Bass (illegal)
- Uncles: A. J. Quartermaine; Jason Morgan; Franco Baldwin (foster); Lucas Jones; Leo Falconeri; Danny McCall (illegal)
- Aunts: Skye Quartermaine (adoptive); Emily Quartermaine (adoptive); Kristina Davis; Molly Lansing
- First cousins: Michael Corinthos; Lila Rae Alcazar (adoptive); Jake Webber; Danny Morgan
- Other relatives: Edward Quartermaine; Lila Quartermaine; Tracy Quartermaine; Ned Quartermaine; Dillon Quartermaine; Brook Lynn Ashton; Ava Jerome; Kiki Jerome; Nikolas Cassadine; Spencer Cassadine; Heather Webber; Steven Webber

Scout Cain is the daughter of Drew Cain and Sam McCall. She was introduced in February 2017 and is named in honor of her adoptive aunt, Emily Quartermaine.

Lori and Sevan Andonian were first cast as Emily Scout Cain. Palmer and Poe Parker were cast next and portrayed the role for almost two years. In mid-2019, Ella Ramacieri was cast in the role and debuted July 1 of the same year. In 2022, actress Cosette Abinante was cast in the role of Scout, succeeding and replacing Ramacieri. In June 2026, it was announced Kayden Brenna Tokarski was recast into the role following decision to age the character up for storyline purposes. She made first appearance July 20 of the same year. During the June 17, 2026, episode, Reagan Park pinch-hit in the role.

=== Charlotte Cassadine ===
Charlotte Cassadine
- General Hospital character
- Portrayed by: Scarlett Fernandez (2016–2021, 2023–2025); Amelie McClain (2021–2023); AnaSofia Bianchi (2023); Bluesy Burke (2025–present)
- Duration: 2016–present
- First appearance: October 13, 2016
- Created by: Shelly Altman and Jean Passanante
- Introduced by: Frank Valentini
In-universe information
- Other names: Charlotte Boland; Charlotte Beaulieu; Charlotte Honor Cassadine; Genevieve LeBlanc; Melanie Cortlandt
- Family: Cassadine; Webber; Spencer
- Father: Valentin Cassadine
- Mother: Lulu Spencer
- Adoptive mother: Claudette Beaulieu (surrogate)
- Half-brothers: Rocco Falconeri
- Grandfathers: Victor Cassadine; Luke Spencer
- Grandmothers: Helena Cassadine; Laura Spencer
- Uncles: Stavros Cassadine; Stefan Cassadine; Nikolas Cassadine; Lucky Spencer; Ethan Lovett
- Aunts: Irina Cassadine; Alexis Davis (step)
- First cousins: Nikolas Cassadine; Sam McCall (step); Kristina Davis (step); Molly Lansing (step); Spencer Cassadine; Cameron Webber (adoptive); Jake Webber (legal); Aiden Spencer; Ace Cassadine; Phoebe Wilson

Charlotte Cassadine is the daughter of Valentin Cassadine and Lulu Spencer, carried by Claudette Beaulieu. She was born from an embryo that Helena Cassadine created and tried to pass off as Stavros' child with Lulu. Claudette realized that Valentin was dangerous after Charlotte was born, and ran away with her. She later asked her ex-husband, Nathan West, to protect them. Claudette tells Nathan that Charlotte is his daughter, but when a DNA test disproves it, Claudette claims her ex-lover, Griffin Munro, is Charlotte's father. When Claudette realizes Valentin has found her, she skips town and leaves Charlotte behind with Griffin. Valentin tells Griffin that he is Charlotte's father, and Nathan receives a note from Claudette affirming the claim. Griffin petitions to have custody of Charlotte, but the judge grants full custody to Valentin. After Charlotte meets Lulu, she finds out the truth about Charlotte. Lulu petitions Valentin for custody, but he is granted sole custody while she is granted supervised weekly visits. Although Charlotte was distant from Lulu at first, the two grow closer. Months later, Valentin and Lulu share joint custody. Charlotte remains close to Nina Reeves. After her mother Lulu collapsed and put into a coma due to a traumatic brain injury and cerebral edema she sustained from the explosion at The Floating Rib (along with her boyfriend Dustin Phillips who died from his injuries), she lives with her father and sometimes with her grandmother Laura.

=== Spencer Cassadine ===
Spencer Cassadine
- General Hospital character
- Portrayed by: Caden & Nicholas Laughlin (2006); Nathan & Spencer Casamassima (2006–2007); Lance Doven (2008); Rami Yousef (2009); Davin Ransom (2009–2011); Nicolas Bechtel (2013–2020); Nicholas Chavez (2021–2024)
- Duration: 2006–2011; 2013–2024
- First appearance: February 20, 2006
- Last appearance: January 31, 2024
- Created by: Robert Guza, Jr. and Charles Pratt, Jr.
- Introduced by: Jill Farren Phelps (2006); Frank Valentini (2013, 2021)
In-universe information
- Other names: John Michael Jacks; Nikolas Cassadine, Jr.; Spencer Alexi Nikolaevich Cassadine; Nikolai Mikkos Nikolaevich Cassadine; Spencer Stefan Niklosovich Cassadine; Victor
- Occupation: Student; Busboy; Prince of Greek nobility
- Family: Cassadine; Webber
- Father: Nikolas Cassadine
- Mother: Courtney Matthews
- Stepmother: Ava Jerome
- Half-brothers: Ace Cassadine
- Grandparents: Stavros Cassadine; Laura Spencer; Mike Corbin; Janine Matthews
- Aunts and uncles: Lucky Spencer; Lulu Spencer; Sonny Corinthos
- First cousins: Cameron Webber (adoptive); Jake Webber (legal); Aiden Spencer; Phoebe Wilson; Charlotte Cassadine; Rocco Falconeri; Dante Falconeri; Gio Palmieri; Michael Corinthos (adoptive); Kristina Davis; Morgan Corinthos; Lila McCall; Sam McCall; Avery Corinthos; Donna Corinthos

Spencer Cassadine is the son of Nikolas Cassadine and Courtney Matthews, introduced in February 2006. He was originally believed to be the son of Jasper Jacks, and Jax decides to keep the secret after Courtney dies. He names the baby John Michael Jacks in honor of Jax and Courtney's fathers. Robin Scorpio learns the truth and announces it at the baby's christening. Nikolas renames the baby Spencer Cassadine in honor of his siblings Lucky and Lulu Spencer. Spencer is kidnapped soon after by his nanny, Colleen McHenry. Before Nikolas can rescue Spencer, he is taken by Helena from Colleen. Nikolas and Emily Quartermaine eventually rescue him. Spencer leaves town with his father and returns with his great-grandmother Lesley Webber.

At his tenth birthday party, Spencer suffers burns and smoke inhalation when a fire breaks out. After Nikolas is presumed dead, Spencer is put under the care of his grandmother Laura Spencer. Spencer asks Laura to let him go to boarding school in France, as Nikolas had planned to enroll Spencer there. She agrees and Spencer leaves. He returns the following summer, intent on getting revenge on Valentin, who is believed to have murdered Nikolas. He is kidnapped by Garvey to draw out Sonny Corinthos, Spencer's uncle. Spencer escapes and Laura sends him back to boarding school for his safety.

When Nikolas returns, he visits Spencer in France with Ava Jerome, his new wife. Spencer is initially happy to see his father but becomes angry when he finds out Nikolas intentionally stayed away to reclaim the Cassadine inheritance from Valentin. Spencer tells Nikolas to stay away and leave him alone. He returns as a young man to Port Charles over a year later, and stalks and harasses Nikolas and Ava by impersonating Ryan Chamberlain to get them to separate.

In 2023, Charlie Mason from Soaps She Knows placed Spencer and his love interest Trina Robinson as a shared entry (at #39 and #38) on his ranked list of General Hospital’s 40+ Greatest Characters of All Time, commenting "Yes, these two lovebirds have to share an entry. How could they not? From the moment Nikolas Cassadine and Courtney Matthews’ son was reintroduced as a brooding young man, we’ve been all about his ultimate pairing with beleaguered heroine Trina."

=== Wiley Cooper-Jones ===
Wiley Cooper-Jones
- General Hospital character
- Portrayed by: Erik and Theodore Olson (2018–2021); Kyler and Caleb Ends (2021); Viron Weaver (2021–present)
- Duration: 2018–present
- First appearance: July 31, 2018
- Created by: Shelly Altman and Chris Van Etten
- Introduced by: Frank Valentini
In-universe information
- Other names: Jonah Michael Corinthos; Wiley Quartermaine Corinthos; Wiley Alan Corinthos
- Family: Quartermaine; Spencer; Corinthos (adoptive)
- Parents: Michael Corinthos; Nelle Benson
- Adoptive parents: Brad Cooper (illegal); Lucas Jones (illegal)
- Adoptive mother: Willow Tait
- Stepparents: Drew Cain (adoptive)
- Half-sisters: Amelia Corinthos; Daisy Gilmore
- Grandfathers: A. J. Quartermaine; Sonny Corinthos (adoptive); Frank Benson (adoptive); Silas Clay
- Grandmothers: Carly Corinthos; Nina Reeves; Harmony Miller (adoptive)
- Uncles: Dante Falconeri (adoptive); Morgan Corinthos; Lucas Jones (adoptive great uncle)
- Aunts: Willow Tait (biological); Kiki Jerome (biological); Kristina Davis (adoptive); Lila McCall (adoptive); Josslyn Jacks; Avery Corinthos (adoptive); Donna Corinthos
- First cousins: Gio Palmieri (adoptive); Rocco Falconeri (adoptive)

Wiley Cooper-Jones is the son of Michael Corinthos and Nelle Benson, introduced on July 31, 2018. Nelle delivers the baby with Liesl Obrecht's help. Calling the baby Jonah, the name she and Michael picked out for him, Nelle runs into Brad Cooper, who is mourning the loss of his adoptive son, Wiley Cooper-Jones. She convinces Brad to switch the babies out of spite towards Michael. Brad takes the baby home to his husband Lucas Jones, while Michael is convinced his son died. In late 2019, Brad reveals to Lucas that Wiley is not their son. Wiley is almost kidnapped by Nelle when she learns Michael knows the truth, but Michael finds her and is reunited with his son. Nelle sues Michael for full custody, but the judge grants full custody to Michael and denies Nelle visitation. Wiley is kidnapped by Nelle, but before she can disappear, Michael finds them and brings Wiley home. After Nelle's death, Wiley is adopted by Willow Tait, Michael's wife and Nelle's twin sister.

=== Amelia Corinthos ===
Amelia Corinthos is the daughter of Michael Corinthos and Willow Tait. Willow suffered from Leukemia during her pregnancy. Amelia was born via emergency c-section but was otherwise healthy.

=== Avery Corinthos ===
Avery Corinthos
- General Hospital character
- Portrayed by: Harper and Presley Carlson (2014); Ava and Grace Scarola (2014–2025); Celesta DeAstis (2018); Ayla Bullington (since 2026)
- Duration: 2014–present
- First appearance: November 4, 2014
- Created by: Ron Carlivati
- Introduced by: Frank Valentini
In-universe information
- Other names: Avery Jerome; Jaime Summers (2014); A.J. (2015)
- Parents: Sonny Corinthos; Ava Jerome
- Stepparents: Drew Cain
- Siblings: Dante Falconeri; Michael Corinthos (adoptive); Kristina Davis; Lila McCall; Kiki Jerome; Morgan Corinthos; Donna Corinthos
- Grandparents: Mike Corbin; Adela Corinthos; Victor Jerome; Delia Ryan
- Aunts and uncles: Olivia St. John; Julian Jerome; Ric Lansing; Courtney Matthews
- Nieces and nephews: Gio Palmieri; Rocco Falconeri; Wiley Cooper-Jones (adoptive); Amelia Corinthos (adoptive); Daisy Gilmore (adoptive); Irene Davis-Ashford
- First cousins: Molly Lansing; Spencer Cassadine; Sam McCall; Lucas Jones; Leo Falconeri

Avery Corinthos is the daughter of Sonny Corinthos and Ava Jerome. Harper and Presley Carlson originated the role in 2014. From 2014 to 2025, Ava and Grace Scarola portrayed the role of Avery, with Celesta DeAstis assuming the role for one episode in 2018. In 2026, Ayla Bullington was recast in the role, making her first appearance on November 9.

Avery was introduced in November 2014, and was kidnapped by Nina Reeves and Franco Baldwin. They relocate to Canada, where Avery is rescued and returned to her mother. When she was born, it was not known whether Sonny or his son Morgan was the father, until a DNA test shows it is Sonny. When both her parents are imprisoned, Avery is primarily raised by her siblings Morgan and Kiki Jerome. Sonny is released and takes custody of Avery, but his son Michael sues and wins full custody before giving Avery back to Sonny. When Ava is released, Avery's parents go to court for custody. The judge grant Ava sole custody of Avery, with Sonny getting supervised visits. When Ava gets threatened, she returns Avery to Sonny to keep her safe. Ava tries to take Avery back later, but is blackmailed by Carly with a sex tape of her and Paul Hornsby. Paul threatens to send Ava to jail with a recording of her admission about killing Connie. Sonny relents and gives Ava limited visitation with Avery until Sonny and Carly learn about Ava's part in Morgan's death. In May 2018, Ava blackmails Sonny into giving her joint custody after Avery is reported missing.

=== Donna Corinthos ===
Donna Corinthos
- General Hospital character
- Portrayed by: Ella and Emma Hullen (2019–2020); Ava Avendano (2021); Arya and Ayla Dormiani (2021–2022); Scarlett Spears (2022–present)
- Duration: 2019–present
- First appearance: September 30, 2019
- Created by: Shelly Altman and Chris Van Etten
- Introduced by: Frank Valentini
In-universe information
- Other names: Donna Courtney Corinthos
- Family: Spencer
- Father: Sonny Corinthos
- Mother: Carly Corinthos
- Stepmother: Nina Reeves (2023-)
- Brothers: Morgan Corinthos
- Half-brothers: Michael Corinthos; Dante Falconeri
- Half-sisters: Kristina Davis; Lila McCall; Josslyn Jacks; Avery Corinthos
- Grandfathers: Mike Corbin; John Durant
- Grandmothers: Adela Corinthos; Bobbie Spencer
- Uncles: Ric Lansing; Lucas Jones (adoptive)
- Aunts: Courtney Matthews; B.J. Jones (adoptive)
- Nephews: Wiley Cooper-Jones; Rocco Falconeri; Gio Palmieri
- Nieces: Amelia Corinthos; Daisy Gilmore
- First cousins: Spencer Cassadine; Molly Lansing

Donna Corinthos is the daughter of Sonny Corinthos and Carly Spencer introduced on September 30, 2019. It is revealed during prenatal testing that Donna has spina bifida, which is treated shortly after her birth.

=== Emma Drake ===
Emma Drake
- General Hospital character
- Portrayed by: Ruby & Rose Romero (2008; Jessie & Gianna Salvatierra (2009–2010); Francesca Cistone (2010–2011); Brooklyn Rae Silzer (2011–2023); Braedyn Bruner (2024–present)
- Duration: 2008–2018; 2020; 2023–present
- First appearance: November 3, 2008
- Created by: Robert Guza, Jr.
- Introduced by: Jill Farren Phelps (2008); Frank Valentini (2020, 2023–2024)
In-universe information
- Other names: Emma Grace Scorpio; Amelia Everett-Ashton
- Family: Scorpio
- Father: Patrick Drake
- Mother: Robin Scorpio
- Brothers: Noah Drake
- Half-brothers: Gabriel Santiago
- Grandparents: Noah Drake; Mattie Drake; Robert Scorpio; Anna Devane
- Aunts and uncles: Matt Hunter; Sasha Gilmore; Leora Hayward
- First cousins: Liam Corbin; Daisy Gilmore
- Other relatives: Mac Scorpio; Peter August; Cody Bell; Maxie Jones (step); Georgie Jones (step); Aidan Devane

Emma Drake is the daughter of Patrick Drake and Robin Scorpio. The role is played by child actress Brooklyn Rae Silzer, who won a Young Artist Award in 2013 for Best Young Actress 10 And Under In A TV Series, for her role as Emma. She is born onscreen in November 2008. When Emma comes down with a fever, she and Robin get stranded in a snowstorm when they go to a doctor. Robin leaves her in Maxie Jones' care, who brings Emma to the hospital where she is diagnosed with pneumonia. When Lisa Niles becomes obsessed with Patrick, she kidnaps Emma, but Robin and Patrick save her. After Robin is presumed dead in a lab explosion, Patrick raises Emma alone. Robin is alive and calls home, but Patrick believes Emma is playing pretend when she tells him about the phone call. Emma does not approve of her father's new girlfriend, Dr. Britt Westbourne, and Patrick breaks up with Britt when he learns she has been treating Emma poorly. When Robin returns, she and Patrick reunite, and Emma and her parents relocate to Berkeley, California. Emma periodically returns with her mother, or to visit her grandmother Anna Devane.

Braedyn Bruner assumed the role in December 2024 when Emma returns to Port Charles to celebrate the Christmas holiday with Anna.

=== Leo Quartermaine ===
Leo Quartermaine
- General Hospital character
- Portrayed by: Verity Jann (2015); Silas and Ezra (2015); Leo and Luca (2016–17); Pressly James Crosby (2017–18); Max Matenko (2018); Aaron Bradshaw (2018–19); Easton Rocket Sweda (2021–present); Isaiah Dell (2022)
- Duration: 2015–2019, 2021–present
- First appearance: October 8, 2015
- Created by: Shelly Altman and Jean Passanante
- Introduced by: Frank Valentini
In-universe information
- Other names: Leonardo Francisco Falconeri; Mateo Falconeri; Leo Falconeri
- Family: Jerome; Quartermaine (adoptive)
- Father: Julian Jerome
- Mother: Olivia Falconeri
- Adoptive father: Ned Quartermaine
- Half-brothers: Dante Falconeri; Lucas Jones; Andrew Nero
- Half-sisters: Sam McCall; Brook Lynn Quartermaine (adoptive)
- Grandfathers: Victor Jerome; Larry Ashton (adoptive)
- Grandmothers: Talia Falconeri; Tracy Quartermaine (adoptive)
- Uncles: Dino Antoinelli; Evan Jerome; Vito Falconeri; Vinnie Falconeri; Phil Falconeri; Cosimo Falconeri; Dillon Quartermaine (adoptive)
- Aunts: Olivia St. John; Ava Jerome
- Nephews: Gio Palmieri; Danny Morgan; Rocco Falconeri
- Nieces: Lila McCall; Scout Cain
- First cousins: Evan Jerome, Jr. Kiki Jerome; Avery Corinthos; Tommy Falconeri

Leo Quartermaine is the son of Julian Jerome and Olivia Falconeri. Olivia initially claims Ned Quartermaine is the father to protect Leo from Julian's world. Leo was introduced in May 2015 as a premature birth. Olivia, Ned, and Liesl fake his death. Olivia returns in August and reveals that she named her son Leonardo. Olivia brings Leo to town and lies about him being an adopted son named Mateo. Alexis Davis is suspicious and runs a DNA test. When Julian finds out, he confronts Olivia and they agree to joint custody of Leo. Julian loses custody after being blackmailed into going back to his criminal life. Olivia allows Julian to be in Leo's life again after his recent release. In 2017, Ned becomes Leo's stepfather, and in 2022, Ned adopts Leo.

=== Rocco Falconeri ===
Rocco Falconeri
- General Hospital character
- Portrayed by: Nolan and Michael Webb (2013); Diego and Mateo (2013–2014); Liam and Oliver Friedy (2014–2015); Charles and Ethan Losie (2015–2016); Mason Tannous (2016); O’Neill Monahan (2017–2020); Brady Bauer (2021); Finn Francis Carr (2022–present)
- Duration: 2013–present
- First appearance: September 9, 2013
- Created by: Ron Carlivati
- Introduced by: Frank Valentini
In-universe information
- Other names: Ben Westbourne (birth name); Cesar Faison II
- Family: Corinthos; Spencer; Webber
- Father: Dante Falconeri
- Mother: Lulu Spencer
- Half-brothers: Gio Palmieri
- Half-sisters: Charlotte Cassadine
- Grandparents: Sonny Corinthos; Olivia Falconeri; Luke Spencer; Laura Spencer
- Uncles: Michael Corinthos (adoptive); Morgan Corinthos; Leo Quartermaine; Nikolas Cassadine; Lucky Spencer; Ethan Lovett
- Aunts: Kristina Davis; Lila McCall; Avery Corinthos; Donna Corinthos
- First cousins: Wiley Cooper-Jones (adoptive); Spencer Cassadine; Cameron Webber (adoptive); Jake Webber (legal); Aiden Webber; Phoebe Wilson; Ace Cassadine; Amelia Corinthos (adoptive); Irene Davis-Ashford; Daisy Gilmore (adoptive)

Rocco Falconeri is the son of Dante Falconeri and Lulu Spencer, carried by Britt Westbourne. Britt originally passes him off as Patrick Drake's son. He is born onscreen in September 2013, and Britt later names him Ben. Ben is later kidnapped by Liesl, who takes Ben to Cassadine Island. He is rescued by Britt and Nikolas Cassadine. Elizabeth Webber notices that Ben and Dante have the same food allergy, and secretly runs a DNA test to confirm Dante is Ben's father. Britt lets Dante have shared custody of Ben, hoping to keep her secret from coming out. Elizabeth learns the truth and tells Lulu and Dante. Before they can claim their son, Liesl kidnaps Ben to help Britt leave town with him. Britt turns Liesl into the police and Ben is rescued. Lulu and Dante are reunited with their son, whom they rename Rocco Falconeri.

=== Violet Finn ===
Violet Finn
- General Hospital character
- Portrayed by: Jophielle Love
- Duration: 2019–24
- First appearance: October 23, 2019
- Last appearance: October 21, 2024
- Created by: Shelly Altman; Jean Passanante
- Introduced by: Frank Valentini
In-universe information
- Father: Hamilton Finn
- Mother: Hayden Barnes
- Grandparents: Gregory Chase
- Uncles: Harrison Chase
- Aunts: Elizabeth Webber
- First cousins: Phoebe Chase (adoptive); Cameron Webber; Jake Webber; Aiden Webber

Violet Finn is the daughter of Hamilton Finn and Hayden Barnes.

=== Josslyn Jacks ===
Josslyn Jacks
- General Hospital character
- Portrayed by: Jamie Lea Willett (2009); McKenna and Karleigh Larson (2009–12); Sarah Johnson (2012–13); Paige Olivier (2013); Hannah Nordberg (2014–15); Eden McCoy (2015–present); Courtney Fulk (2023–2024)
- Duration: 2009–present
- First appearance: November 3, 2009
- Created by: Robert Guza, Jr.
- Introduced by: Jill Farren Phelps
In-universe information
- Other names: Kara Grant; Josslyn John Jacks
- Occupation: Student; WSB agent Lab assistant Clinic volunteer Lifeguard; Waitress; Camp counselor
- Family: Spencer
- Father: Jasper Jacks
- Mother: Carly Corinthos
- Stepfather: Sonny Corinthos (2015–2022)
- Half-brothers: Michael Corinthos; Morgan Corinthos
- Half-sisters: Donna Corinthos
- Grandfathers: John Jacks; John Durant; Frank Benson (adoptive)
- Grandmothers: Jane Jacks; Bobbie Spencer; Virginia Benson (adoptive)
- Aunts and uncles: Jerry Jacks; B. J. Jones (adoptive); Lucas Jones (adoptive); Nelle Benson (adoptive)
- Nephews: Wiley Cooper-Jones
- Nieces: Amelia Corinthos; Daisy Gilmore
- Other relatives: Luke Spencer; Lucky Spencer; Ethan Lovett; Lulu Spencer; Cameron Webber (adoptive)

Josslyn Jacks is the daughter of Jasper Jacks and Carly Corinthos. After her birth, Claudia Zacchara tries to take the baby away from Carly, but is stopped when her brother Michael Corinthos kills her. Josslyn is christened, with Jason Morgan and Lulu Spencer as her godparents. When Josslyn is diagnosed with a rare form of kidney cancer, she is saved by a kidney donation from Jake Spencer after he is killed in a hit-and-run accident. It is discovered later that the kidney is not Jake's, and that Jax had arranged for Josslyn to get Nelle Benson's kidney. Jax and Carly fight over custody of Josslyn, and Carly wins sole custody. Jax kidnaps Josslyn, but he returns her to Carly. Josslyn is kidnapped by Dr. Ewen Keenan on orders from Jerry Jacks, Josslyn's uncle. Jerry injects Josslyn with a substance and she is briefly hospitalized with a high fever. Jerry later reveals that he inoculated Josslyn against a poison that he put into the Port Charles water supply. She has a troubled relationship with Sonny after he has Jax deported.

=== Bailey Jones ===
Bailey Jones
- General Hospital character
- Portrayed by: Capri and Teddy (2021); Harper and Scarlett Bloom (2021); Odell-Twins (2021); London and Jett Prinzo-Berendt (2021–present)
- Duration: 2021–present
- First appearance: May 28, 2021
- Created by: Chris Van Etten and Dan O'Connor
- Introduced by: Frank Valentini
In-universe information
- Other names: Lu Jones; Bailey Lois Quartermaine (2021–2022); Bailey Louise Jones
- Family: Jones
- Father: Peter August
- Mother: Maxie Jones
- Half-brothers: James West
- Half-sisters: Georgie Spinelli
- Grandfathers: Frisco Jones; Cesar Faison; Mac Scorpio (step)
- Grandmothers: Felicia Jones; Alex Devane Marick
- Uncles: Nathan West; Cassius Faison
- Aunts: Georgie Jones; Britt Westbourne
- First cousins: James West
- Other relatives: Anna Devane; Robin Scorpio; Emma Drake; Noah Drake; Tony Jones; B.J. Jones; Lucas Jones

Bailey Louise Jones is the daughter of Maxie Jones and Peter August. She is introduced in May 2021 after Maxie escapes from Marie Hopkins, who is hired by Peter to induce Maxie's labor so he could leave the country with them and avoid prosecution for his crimes. Maxie goes into labor and delivers Louise with the help of Austin Gatlin Holt. Marie tries to force Maxie to return with her and Louise. Maxie fights her off and runs, tricking Marie into falling to her death. To keep Louise safe from Peter, Maxie gives Louise to Brook Lynn Quartermaine, who is faking a pregnancy to get Valentin to give her shares of ELQ, her family's company. Brook Lynn brings Louise back and calls her Bailey Lois Quartermaine.

Peter discovers Bailey is Louise, and kidnaps her, trying to force Maxie to leave town with him. Maxie, though, convinces him to leave Louise behind, so Louise won't be forced to live on the run. Louise is rescued, and Brook Lynn looks after her while Felicia & Anna Devane try to rescue Maxie. Peter dies and Maxie is rescued, and is finally reunited with her daughter. She decides to name her daughter Bailey Louise, and names Brook Lynn her honorary mother.

=== Danny Morgan ===
Danny Morgan
- General Hospital character
- Portrayed by: Gage & Gavin (2012); Claire and Juliette (2012); Finn (2012); Jaxon and Jakob Kring (2012–2014); Caden and Corben Rothweiler (2014–2015); Braiden and Dylan Kazowski (2015–2016); T.K. Weaver (2016–2019); Porter Fasullo (2019–2021); Zakary Risinger (2021); Asher Antonyzyn (2023–present)
- Duration: 2012–present
- First appearance: June 1, 2012
- Created by: Ron Carlivati
- Introduced by: Frank Valentini
In-universe information
- Other names: Daniel Edward Morgan; Jason Morgan, Jr.; Victor Lord III
- Family: Quartermaine; Jerome; Cassadine
- Father: Jason Morgan
- Mother: Sam McCall
- Half-brothers: Jake Webber
- Half-sisters: Lila McCall; Scout Cain
- Grandfathers: Alan Quartermaine; Julian Jerome; Cody McCall (illegal)
- Grandmothers: Susan Moore; Monica Quartermaine (adoptive); Alexis Davis; Evelyn Bass (illegal)
- Uncles: A. J. Quartermaine; Drew Cain; Lucas Jones; Leo Falconeri; Danny McCall (illegal)
- Aunts: Skye Quartermaine (adoptive); Emily Quartermaine (adoptive); Dawn Winthrop (adoptive); Kristina Davis; Molly Lansing
- First cousins: Michael Corinthos; Lila Rae Alcazar (adoptive); Oscar Nero; Scout Cain
- Other relatives: Edward Quartermaine; Lila Quartermaine; Tracy Quartermaine; Ned Quartermaine; Dillon Quartermaine; Brook Lynn Ashton; Gio Palmieri; Ava Jerome; Kiki Jerome; Avery Corinthos; Nikolas Cassadine; Spencer Cassadine; Heather Webber; Steve Webber; Franco Baldwin; Ace Cassadine

Danny Morgan is the son of Jason Morgan and Sam McCall. Gage and Gavin had the role initially in 2012 before being replaced by Jaxon and Jakob Kring from 2012 to 2014. Due to child labor laws and the amount of scenes Danny had, Claire and Juliette were cast, and alternated scenes with Jaxon and Jakob in 2012. Caden and Corben Rothweiler were cast from 2014 to 2015. Braiden and Dylan Kazowski were cast from 2015 to 2016. TK Weaver was cast from 2016 to May 2019. On May 31, 2019, Porter Fasullo took over the role. As of 2023, teen actor/Chicago native Asher Antonyzyn is currently portraying the role of Danny Morgan.

Danny Morgan was born onscreen in June 2012. Danny is initially believed to be the son of Sam's alleged rapist, Franco after Heather Webber switches the paternity test. He is switched at birth by Todd Manning and Heather with Téa Delgado's stillborn son, Victor Lord III. Téa takes him home to Llanview, and Jason later figures out Sam's baby was switched with Téa's. Heather kidnaps the baby, and Jason and Sam rescue their son, naming him in honor of his adoptive uncle, Danny McCall, and great-grandfather, Edward Quartermaine. Danny is diagnosed with leukemia on his first birthday. When Danny does not respond to treatment, Sam looks for a bone marrow donor. Julian Jerome gives a bone marrow transplant, saving his grandson's life.

=== Aiden Webber ===
Aiden Webber
- General Hospital character
- Portrayed by: Adrian & Brett Ritter (2010–2011); Maximo & Finbar (2011) Titus Jackson (2011–2012); Jason David (2012–2021); Enzo De Angelis (2021–2024); Tristan Riggs (2024); Colin Cassidy (2024–present)
- Duration: 2010–2013, 2015–present
- First appearance: July 19, 2010
- Created by: Robert Guza, Jr.
- Introduced by: Jill Farren Phelps; Frank Valentini (2012–2024)
In-universe information
- Other names: Aiden Alexi Niklosovich Cassadine (birth name); Aiden Webber
- Family: Spencer; Hardy; Webber
- Father: Lucky Spencer
- Mother: Elizabeth Webber
- Half-brothers: Cameron Webber; Jake Webber
- Grandparents: Luke Spencer; Laura Spencer; Jeff Webber; Carolyn Webber
- Uncles: Nikolas Cassadine; Ethan Lovett; Steve Webber
- Aunts: Lulu Spencer; Sarah Webber; Hayden Barnes
- First cousins: Spencer Cassadine; Charlotte Cassadine; Rocco Falconeri; Ace Cassadine; Phoebe Chase (adoptive); Violet Finn

Aiden Webber is the son of Lucky Spencer and Elizabeth Webber. From 2011 to 2012, the role was played by Titus Jackson, real-life son to Jonathan Jackson, who played his on-screen father, Lucky. Jason David took over the role in 2012. Colin Cassidy assumed the role during the September 30, 2024, episode.

Aiden is introduced in July 2010 and is originally believed to be Nikolas Cassadine's son after Helena switches a paternity test. Aiden is kidnapped by Franco and given to his mother. Lucky finds Aiden and returns him to Elizabeth and Nikolas. Elizabeth gets another DNA test, which confirms Lucky is his father. She tells Lucky and Nikolas months later, and Nikolas briefly kidnaps Aiden before returning him to Elizabeth and Lucky. When Aiden is diagnosed with immune thrombocytopenic purpura, he receives a blood transfusion from his aunt Lulu and fully recovers. In 2018–19, Aiden is harshly bullied in school because the class assumes he might be gay. His cousin Charlotte Cassadine is found to be one of the main instigators. His brother Cameron defends him, and Elizabeth and Franco try to get his teacher, Willow, to step in and intervene. Elizabeth chooses to accept Aiden if he ever comes out as gay.

=== Georgie Spinelli ===
Georgie Spinelli
- General Hospital character
- Portrayed by: Elle and Eve Tanz (2013); Londyn and Teagan (2013–14); Harper Barash (2015); Lily Fisher (2017–present); Eden Harker (2023); Juliet Donenfeld (2024)
- Duration: 2013–2015; 2017–present
- First appearance: August 21, 2013
- Created by: Ron Carlivati
- Introduced by: Frank Valentini
In-universe information
- Other names: Constanza Louise Falconeri II; Georgianna Spinelli
- Family: Scorpio/Jones
- Father: Damian Spinelli
- Mother: Maxie Jones
- Half-brothers: James West
- Half-sisters: Louise Jones
- Grandparents: Frisco Jones; Felicia Jones; Mac Scorpio (step)
- Aunts: Georgie Jones
- Other relatives: Robin Scorpio (step); Emma Drake (step); Noah Drake (step); Dante Falconeri (godfather); Lulu Spencer-Falconeri (godmother)

Georgie Spinelli is the daughter of Damian Spinelli and Maxie Jones. Maxie tries to pass her off as Dante and Lulu Falconeri's, whom she agrees to be a surrogate for until she miscarried. Maxie gives birth via C-section; Dante and Lulu name the baby Constanza "Connie" Louise Falconeri, and ask Maxie and Damien to be her godparents. At the christening, Brad Cooper arrives and tells Dante and Lulu that Connie is Maxie and Damien's biological daughter. After a custody battle, Spinelli is awarded full custody of Connie, while Maxie is not allowed to have any contact with her daughter for six months. In mid-December, Damien and his girlfriend, Ellie Trout, move with Connie to Portland. Despite the court order, Damien takes the baby to say goodbye to Maxie and they rename her Georgie after Maxie's late sister and Spinelli's good friend, Georgie Jones. Maxie is granted visitation rights by a judge and spends the holidays with Georgie. Damien and Georgie temporarily move back to Port Charles when Damien tries to reconcile with Maxie. He later reconciles with Ellie, and takes Georgie back to Portland with her.

=== Cameron Webber ===
Cameron Webber
- General Hospital character
- Portrayed by: Uncredited (2004–05); Ashwyn Bagga (2005–06); Braeden Walkes (2006–12); Michael Leone (2013–18); Anthony Saliba (2013); Cade McWatt (2018); William Lipton (2018–2024)
- Duration: 2004–2024
- First appearance: June 18, 2004
- Last appearance: December 19, 2024
- Created by: Robert Guza, Jr. and Charles Pratt, Jr.
- Introduced by: Jill Farren Phelps (2004); Frank Valentini (2018)
In-universe information
- Other names: Cameron Steven Webber; Cameron Spencer
- Occupation: Student; Busboy; Camp counselor
- Family: Spencer; Hardy Webber
- Parents: Zander Smith; Elizabeth Webber
- Stepfather: Lucky Spencer (2005–2007); Franco Baldwin (2019–2021)
- Half-brothers: Jake Webber; Aiden Spencer
- Grandfathers: Cameron Lewis; Jeff Webber; Luke Spencer (step); Scott Baldwin (step)
- Grandmothers: Carolyn Webber; Laura Spencer (step)
- Uncles: Peter Lewis; Steve Webber; Nikolas Cassadine (step); Ethan Lovett (step)
- Aunts: Sarah Webber; Hayden Barnes; Lulu Spencer (step)
- First cousins: Spencer Cassadine (step); Charlotte Cassadine (step); Rocco Falconeri (step); Violet Finn; Ace Cassadine (step); Phoebe Wilson (step)

Cameron Webber is the biological son of Zander Smith and Elizabeth Webber.

Ashwyn Bagga was cast as Cameron Steven Webber from 2005 to 2006. Braeden Walkes took over the role in 2006 until 2012. Michael Leone was cast as Cameron in 2013 and left in 2018. Anthony Saliba briefly portrayed the character in 2013. Cade McWatt took over the role on July 3, 2018. In August 2018, it was announced that he was let go from the series with William Lipton cast in the role.

Elizabeth is in a stormy marriage with Ric Lansing, and finds it hard to trust him due to his fascination for revenge against his brother, Sonny Corinthos. After Elizabeth miscarries his child, Ric blames Sonny and takes Carly hostage to give her unborn baby to Elizabeth to raise. Elizabeth finds out and is horrified by Ric's actions. On October 31, 2003, she sleeps with Zander Smith for the second time and ends up pregnant. Due to Zander's dangerous lifestyle, Elizabeth and Ric (who have reconciled) decide to raise the child together without Zander's involvement, who agrees. Elizabeth divorces Ric when she realizes that he will not let go of his obsession with Sonny. Before Zander's death in a police shootout, Elizabeth agrees to name their son Cameron in honor of Zander's father, Cameron Lewis.

Cameron is introduced in May 2004 in California before he and Elizabeth arrive in Port Charles a month later. Elizabeth raises him as a single mother, and he is often left in the care of Elizabeth's grandmother, Audrey Hardy, while Elizabeth studies to become a certified nurse at General Hospital. When she marries Lucky Spencer in 2005, he becomes the father figure in Cameron's life. Although they divorce in late 2007, and Lucky does not legally adopt him, the Spencers maintain a presence in Cameron's life. Cameron accidentally sets Elizabeth's house on fire while playing with matches, sending Elizabeth to the hospital when she goes to rescue his little brother Jake. In January 2011, Cameron is on the bus during the General Hospital ski trip when it crashs, but avoids being severely injured.

In 2014, Cameron and his cousin Spencer Cassadine fight over who gets to "date" Emma Scorpio-Drake. Cameron and Emma dance together the night of the Nurses' Ball, but their performance is interrupted by Spencer. Later, Cameron helps Ric reconnect with Elizabeth. At the 2015 Nurses' Ball, Cameron and Emma are set to perform the tango again but are interrupted again by Spencer, who throws sandbags on the stage.

In 2017, his aunt Hayden shows up and offers to take him for the day. After getting a treat at the coffee kiosk, Spencer and Cameron start arguing about Emma, and Spencer starts a food fight that is stopped by their grandmother, Laura Spencer.

In early August 2018, Cameron is caught stealing earbuds.

=== Jake Webber ===
Jake Webber
- General Hospital character
- Portrayed by: Landon and Trey (2007); Amanda, Miranda and Maryssa Jones (2007); Edward and James Nigbor (2007–11); James Nigbor (2015–16); Hudson West (2016–2024)
- Duration: 2007–2011; 2015–2019; 2021–2024
- First appearance: May 4, 2007
- Last appearance: July 15, 2024
- Created by: Robert Guza, Jr.
- Introduced by: Jill Farren Phelps (2007); Frank Valentini (2015)
- Spin-off appearances: General Hospital: Night Shift
In-universe information
- Other names: Jacob Martin Spencer (birth name); Jake Morgan
- Family: Quartermaine; Hardy; Webber; Spencer (legal)
- Father: Jason Morgan; Lucky Spencer (legal)
- Mother: Elizabeth Webber
- Half-brothers: Cameron Webber; Aiden Spencer; Danny Morgan
- Grandfathers: Alan Quartermaine; Jeff Webber; Luke Spencer (legal)
- Grandmothers: Susan Moore; Monica Quartermaine (adoptive); Carolyn Webber; Laura Spencer (legal)
- Uncles: A. J. Quartermaine; Drew Cain; Steve Webber; Nikolas Cassadine (legal); Ethan Lovett (legal)
- Aunts: Skye Quartermaine (adoptive); Emily Quartermaine (adoptive); Dawn Winthrop (adoptive); Sarah Webber; Hayden Barnes; Lulu Spencer (legal)
- First cousins: Michael Corinthos; Lila Rae Alcazar (adoptive); Oscar Nero; Scout Cain; Spencer Cassadine (legal); Charlotte Cassadine (legal); Rocco Falconeri (legal); Ace Cassadine (legal); Phoebe Wilson (legal)
- Other relatives: Edward Quartermaine; Lila Quartermaine; Tracy Quartermaine; Ned Quartermaine; Dillon Quartermaine; Brook Lynn Ashton; Heather Webber; Steve Webber; Franco Baldwin; Jonah Corinthos; Bobbie Spencer (legal); Carly Corinthos (legal); Michael Corinthos (legal); Morgan Corinthos (legal); Josslyn Jacks (legal)

Jake Webber is the son of Jason Morgan and Elizabeth Webber. Jason agrees to let Elizabeth and Lucky Spencer raise the baby to protect him from Jason's mob business. Jake is kidnapped by Maureen Harper, but is rescued by Jason and returned to Elizabeth. Jake is again kidnapped by Jason's enemies and rescued by Sam McCall. In March 2011, Jake is struck by Luke Spencer in a hit-and-run incident. He is declared brain-dead and placed on life support. Lucky and Elizabeth agree to give Jake's kidney to Josslyn Jacks, who has cancer. In July 2015, he is revealed to be alive after being kidnapped by Helena Cassadine. He is rescued by Lucky, Luke, and Laura, and returns home to be raised by Drew and Elizabeth. When Drew and Elizabeth's engagement ends, Jake is upset and tries to get Drew to come back home, and vandalizes the house to try to get his parents to reconcile. Sam tries to help Jake when she figures this out, but Jake panics and runs away. Sam follows him, but she slips and falls down the stairs. Scared that he hurt Sam, Jake runs away on his bike and gets hit by a car. Jake survives and is taken to a children's hospital, where he recovers from his injuries. Jake is conditioned by Helena, and at the 2017 Nurses Ball. He receives a dangerous chemical weapon created by the WSB known as the Chimera. He was allowed to do his magic routine after the Nurse's Ball ended, where he almost opened the Chimera. He was stopped by Drew, Elizabeth, and Valentin.

=== James West ===
James West
- General Hospital character
- Portrayed by: Sally Brown (2018); Marciano twins (2018–2019); Kyler and Caleb Ends (2019); Owen and Curtis Rufca (2019); Gary James Fuller (2023–present)
- Duration: 2018–present
- First appearance: May 21, 2018
- Created by: Shelly Altman and Chris Van Etten
- Introduced by: Frank Valentini
In-universe information
- Other names: James Malcolm West
- Family: Scorpio/Jones
- Father: Nathan West
- Mother: Maxie Jones
- Half-sisters: Georgie Spinelli; Louise Jones
- Grandfathers: Cesar Faison; Frisco Jones; Mac Scorpio (step)
- Grandmothers: Liesl Obrecht; Madeline Reeves (adoptive); Felicia Jones
- Uncles: Peter August; Cassius Faison
- Aunts: Britt Westbourne; Nina Reeves (adoptive); Georgie Jones
- Other relatives: Nelle Benson; Wiley Quartermaine Corinthos

James West is the son of Nathan West and Maxie Jones, introduced on May 21, 2018.

Sally Brown was cast as James Malcolm West, who were replaced by the Marciano twins. On August 30, 2019, Kyler and Caleb Ends were recast for the role. Maxie's water breaks in Peter's car after leaving the Nurses' Ball. She has Peter pull over, and he helps deliver James on the side of the road. Maxie names him after his late father, Nathan and her step-father, Mac Scorpio.

== Former characters ==
=== Lila Rae Alcazar ===
Lila Rae Alcazar
- General Hospital character
- Portrayed by: Gianna Crane (2006–07); Kayla Madison (2012)
- Duration: 2006–07; 2012
- First appearance: October 23, 2006
- Last appearance: November 21, 2012
- Created by: Robert Guza, Jr.
- Introduced by: Jill Farren Phelps (2006); Frank Valentini (2012)
In-universe information
- Other names: Lila Rae Quartermaine
- Family: Quartermaine (adoptive); Chandler (foster)
- Father: Lorenzo Alcazar
- Mother: Skye Quartermaine
- Half-brothers: Diego Alcazar
- Grandparents: Rae Cummings; Alan Quartermaine (adoptive); Adam Chandler (foster); Althea Paterson (foster)
- Uncles: Luís Alcazar; A. J. Quartermaine (adoptive); Jason Morgan (adoptive); Drew Cain (adoptive); JR Chandler (foster); Miguel Reyes (foster)
- Aunts: Emily Quartermaine (adoptive); Hayley Vaughan (foster); Anna Chandler (foster); Colby Chandler (foster)
- First cousins: Sage Alcazar; Michael Corinthos (adoptive); Jake Webber (adoptive); Danny Morgan (adoptive); Oscar Nero (adoptive); Scout Cain (adoptive); Enzo Santos (foster); AJ Chandler (foster)

Lila Rae Alcazar is the daughter of Lorenzo Alcazar and Skye Quartermaine. She is named after Skye's adoptive grandmother, Lila Quartermaine, and Skye's biological mother, Rae Cummings.

Skye is reluctant to let Lorenzo be a part of Lila's life because of his mobster background. After Lila was born, they reconcile, with Lila Rae's last name being changed to her father's. Skye is revealed to be forced to stay with Lorenzo, who threatens to kill her if she tries to take the baby from him again. Skye helps Lorenzo's rival, Jason Morgan, get rid of Lorenzo. Skye gets Lila Rae back when she and Lorenzo plan on moving away, and Jason kills Lorenzo. Shortly after, Skye and Lila Rae leave town. Lila Rae visits Port Charles with Skye to meet her family and attend Edward Quartermaine's funeral.

=== Alec Barrett ===
Alec Barrett
- General Hospital character
- Portrayed by: Quinn Friedman
- First appearance: May 12, 2011
- Last appearance: July 21, 2011
- Created by: Robert Guza, Jr.
- Introduced by: Jill Farren Phelps
In-universe information
- Other names: Aleksander Janáček, Jr. Alec Scott; Aleksander Barrett
- Parents: Aleksander Janáček; Brenda Barrett
- Grandparents: Theo Hoffman; Suzanne Stanwyck; Harlan Barrett; Veronica Wilding
- Aunts: Julia Barrett

Alec Barrett is the son of Aleksander Janáček and Brenda Barrett. Brenda believes she miscarried, but Alec's grandmother, Suzanne Stanwyck, fakes his death and keeps him hidden. When Brenda learns the truth, Suzanne brings Lucian to Brenda and claims he is her son. When Brenda decides to get a DNA test done, Suzanne takes Lucian back and tries to disappear with Alec, but is found by Sonny Corinthos, who returns Alec to Brenda. Brenda divorces Sonny, and she and Alec move to Rome, Italy.

=== Taylor DuBois ===
Taylor DuBois
- General Hospital character
- Portrayed by: Samantha Logan (2013); Pepi Sonuga (2013)
- First appearance: June 4, 2013
- Last appearance: December 13, 2013
- Created by: Ron Carlivati
- Introduced by: Frank Valentini
In-universe information
- Brothers: Felix DuBois

Taylor DuBois is the younger sister of Felix DuBois. Taylor comes to Port Charles to spend the summer with her big brother Felix (Marc Anthony Samuel) and falls for TJ Ashford (Tequan Richmond). The role was originated by Samantha Logan who made her first appearance on June 4, 2013. In September 2013, it was announced that the role had been recast with actress Pepi Sonuga who made her onscreen debut later that month.

Angela Durrell said Taylor's introduction would not only add to the dynamic for the younger characters, but would also make things interesting for the adults. Soap Opera Network said Logan's introduction came just in time for the usual summer teen storylines. The July 8 issue of Soaps In Depth listed Taylor at No. 3 in the "5 Things We're Loving" section. Jamey Giddens praised the actress and the dynamic that Taylor brought to the teen scene and likened Taylor and Molly to the '90s feud between Brenda Barrett (Vanessa Marcil) and Karen Wexler (Marie Wilson).

=== B. J. Jones ===
B. J. Jones
- General Hospital character
- Portrayed by: Brighton Hertford (1986–1994, 2024); Marissa Carrera (2005); Kirsten Storms (2009)
- Duration: 1986–1994; 2005; 2009; 2024
- First appearance: October 6, 1986
- Last appearance: January 11, 2024
- Created by: Pat Falken Smith; Norma Monty
- Introduced by: Gloria Monty; Jill Farren Phelps (2005, 2009); Frank Valentini (2024)
- Book appearances: Robin's Diary
In-universe information
- Other names: Barbara Jean Jones; Angela Brighton
- Family: Jones; Spencer (adoptive)
- Parents: Tony Jones; Tania Roskov
- Adoptive mother: Bobbie Spencer
- Brothers: Lucas Jones (adoptive)
- Half-sisters: Carly Corinthos (adoptive)
- Grandfathers: Andrew Jones; Boris Roskov; Tim Spencer (adoptive)
- Grandmothers: Cindy Jones; Lena Eckert (adoptive)
- Uncles: Frisco Jones; Luke Spencer (adoptive)
- Aunts: Pat Spencer(adoptive)
- Nephews: Michael Corinthos (adoptive); Morgan Corinthos (adoptive)
- Nieces: Josslyn Jacks (adoptive)
- First cousins: Maxie Jones; Georgie Jones; Valerie Spencer (adoptive); Lucky Spencer (adoptive); Ethan Lovett (adoptive); Lulu Spencer (adoptive)

B. J. Jones is born on October 6, 1986, and is the daughter of Tony Jones and his first wife, Tania Roskov. She is named Barbara Jean in honor of nurse Bobbie Spencer, who helped with the delivery. Bobbie adopts B. J. and marries Tony years later after Tania dies in a car accident.

B. J. is left brain-dead after her school van is hit by a drunk driver in May 1994. Tony makes the decision to donate B. J.'s organs, and her heart was transplanted into her ailing cousin Maxie Jones. The storyline won critical acclaim and several awards for acting and writing, and remains of one the greatest storylines in daytime history.

In February 2009, as part of the ABC Daytime "Go Red" campaign for women with heart disease, the storyline was reprised. Maxie falls asleep after attending the "Go Red" fashion show in New York City; while asleep she dreams of an alternate universe where she died and B. J. lived. On October 6, 2011, Maxie celebrates B. J.'s birthday with a red heart balloon and a small stone saying "Barbara Jean Jones: Will not be forgotten." In January 2024, Brighton Hertford reprised the role in episodes pertaining to the death of Bobbie Spencer. In the episodes, B. J. appears under the guise of Angela Brighton, a journalist doing a profile on Bobbie.

=== Rafe Kovich, Jr. ===
Rafe Kovich, Jr.
- General Hospital character
- Portrayed by: Jimmy Deshler
- Duration: 2013–14
- First appearance: January 30, 2013
- Last appearance: July 16, 2014
- Created by: Ron Carlivati
- Introduced by: Frank Valentini
In-universe information
- Parents: Stephen Clay; Alison Barrington; Rafe Kovich (legal)
- Adoptive parents: Silas Clay (foster); Sam Morgan (foster)
- Stepmother: Livvie Locke (2003)
- Grandparents: Malcolm Barrington; Elizabeth Barrington
- Uncles: Silas Clay
- First cousins: Kiki Jerome; Nelle Benson; Willow Tait
- Other relatives: Amanda Barrington

Rafe Kovich, Jr. is the son of Stephen Clay and Alison Barrington, and the legal son of Rafe Kovich. The character was created from the storyline of the defunct spin-off series Port Charles, where the character was originally the son of Caleb Morley and Alison.

Rafe arrives in Port Charles with Alison, having spent most of his life on the run. He bonds with Molly Lansing when she buys him lunch. Soon after, he witnesses Alison being murdered by Caleb. John McBain finds Rafe next to his mother's body, and Rafe is arrested. Rafe insists he is innocent and accuses John. Caleb shows up to free Rafe, but Rafe escapes and hides in Molly's house before being discovered and sent back to jail. When Caleb kidnaps Molly's sister, Sam Morgan, and nephew, Danny, John and Rafe break out of prison with Lucy Coe to rescue them. While John and Lucy rescue Sam, Rafe watches over Danny to protect him from Heather Webber. He is adopted by Sam after being released by the police. When Stephen's brother Silas shows up in town, he sues Sam for custody of Rafe and wins, but he lets Rafe stay with Sam. The two bond, and Rafe moves in with his uncle. Rafe develops a crush on Molly, but she is dating TJ Ashford. Rafe tries to break them apart with Taylor DuBois' help. Molly cuts Rafe out of her life when she finds out. Upset and depressed, Rafe starts using cocaine and stealing money from Sam to get drugs. Rafe causes an accident to run Patrick Drake's family off the road. Rafe tries to skip town, but Molly catches up to him and they drive off in Silas' car. Rafe tells Molly he caused the accident, but was ordered to run Patrick off the road. Before he can tell Molly who ordered him, the car crashes. Rafe is rushed to the hospital with a serious head injury. He is left brain-dead and put on life support before his family say their farewells.

=== Oscar Nero ===
Oscar Nero
- General Hospital character
- Portrayed by: Rio Mangini (2017); Garren Stitt (2017–19)
- Duration: 2017–19
- First appearance: June 23, 2017
- Last appearance: June 27, 2019
- Created by: Shelly Altman; Jean Passanante
- Introduced by: Frank Valentini
In-universe information
- Other names: Oscar Nero Quartermaine
- Family: Quartermaine
- Parents: Drew Cain; Kim Nero
- Stepmother: Sam McCall (2018)
- Half-brothers: Andrew
- Half-sisters: Scout Cain
- Grandparents: Alan Quartermaine; Susan Moore; Monica Quartermaine (adoptive); Betsy Frank (foster)
- Uncles: A. J. Quartermaine; Jason Morgan; Franco Baldwin (foster)
- Aunts: Skye Quartermaine (adoptive); Emily Quartermaine (adoptive)
- First cousins: Michael Corinthos; Lila Rae Alcazar (adoptive); Jake Webber; Danny Morgan
- Other relatives: Edward Quartermaine; Lila Quartermaine; Tracy Quartermaine; Ned Quartermaine; Dillon Quartermaine; Brook Lynn Ashton; Heather Webber; Steve Webber; Franco Baldwin

Oscar Nero, born on October 16, 2002, is the previously unknown son of Drew Cain (Billy Miller) and Dr. Kim Nero (Tamara Braun). The role was first played by Rio Mangini for two episodes on June 23 and 26, 2017. After Mangini joining the cast of Everything Sucks, the role was recast with Garren Stitt, who debuted a week later on July 7. Stitt exited the role on May 2, 2019, after Oscar dies from a brain tumor.

=== Teddy Rivera ===
Teddy Rivera
- General Hospital character
- Portrayed by: Eli and Ilee Alzubaidy
- First appearance: May 23, 2016
- Last appearance: September 21, 2016
- Created by: Shelly Altman; Jean Passanante
- Introduced by: Frank Valentini
In-universe information
- Other names: Eduardo Rivera
- Father: Carlos Rivera
- Mother: Sabrina Santiago
- Half-brothers: Gabriel Santiago
- Grandfathers: Javier Rivera
- Grandmothers: Gabriella Santiago
- Uncles: Joe Rivera
- Other relatives: Armando Santiago; Inocencia Santos; Juan Santiago (adoptive)

Teddy Rivera is the son of Carlos Rivera and Sabrina Santiago. Teddy is born off-screen while Sabrina and Carlos are on the run. Teddy is in Puerto Rico being held captive by Carlos' friend, but Sabrina has her aunt, Inocencia Santos, take Teddy to Port Charles and give him to the Quartermaine family, and Tracy Quartermaine becomes Teddy's foster mother. Sabrina is rescued by Michael Corinthos and reunites with her son. Teddy falls sick and is diagnosed with botulism, and recovers in the hospital. After Sabrina is murdered, his paternal uncle, Joe Rivera, comes to take custody of Teddy. Despite Tracy's protests, Michael gives Teddy to Joe, who takes him back to Puerto Rico.

=== Gabriel Santiago ===
Gabriel Santiago
- General Hospital character
- First appearance: April 25, 2014
- Last appearance: June 5, 2014
- Created by: Ron Carlivati
- Introduced by: Frank Valentini
In-universe information
- Father: Patrick Drake
- Mother: Sabrina Santiago
- Half-brothers: Teddy Rivera; Noah Scorpio-Drake
- Half-sisters: Emma Drake
- Grandfathers: Noah Drake
- Grandmothers: Mattie Drake; Gabriella Santiago
- Uncles: Matt Hunter

Gabriel Drake Santiago is the son of Patrick Drake and Sabrina Santiago. Gabriel was born prematurely April 25, 2014, after his family are in a car accident. He is rushed to the hospital and treated by Britt Westbourne in the neonatal intensive-care unit. As his condition appears to improve, his family decides to name him Gabriel Drake Santiago. Gabriel's condition worsens when he is diagnosed with necrotizing enterocolitis, resulting in massive organ failure and his death.
