= Noah Drake =

- General Hospital character
- Portrayed by: Rick Springfield
- Duration: 1981–1983; 2005–2008; 2012–2013
- First appearance: March 25, 1981
- Last appearance: April 15, 2013
- Created by: Pat Falken Smith; Margaret DePriest
- Introduced by: Gloria Monty (1981); Jill Farren Phelps (2005); Frank Valentini (2012)
- Book appearances: The Secret Life of Damian Spinelli
In-universe information
- Other names: Eli Love
- Occupation: Neurosurgeon
- Spouse: Mattie Drake
- Children: Patrick Drake; Matt Hunter
- Grandchildren: Emma Drake; Gabriel Santiago; Noah Scorpio-Drake
- Aunts and uncles: Martin Drake

Noah Drake is a fictional character on the ABC daytime soap opera General Hospital. The role has been portrayed by Australian musician and actor Rick Springfield. In 2007, Springfield also played Drake's look-alike, fictional rock star Eli Love and at the 2013 Nurses Ball, Springfield portrayed himself during a performance of "Jessie's Girl".

== Casting ==
Rick Springfield originated the role of Noah Drake on March 25, 1981, and played the character for two years before leaving to pursue his music career, last airing on January 27, 1983. Springfield was asked to return to the show in 2005 and first appeared on December 2. The stay was originally planned to be four episodes, but the series asked Springfield to stay on longer. He continued appearing until August 24, 2007. He returned again for a summer story arc the following year, from July 8 through September 22, 2008. In 2012, Springfield made a guest appearance during Kimberly McCullough's exit storyline. In 2013, Springfield made an appearance to celebrate the show's 50th anniversary. Springfield also played himself, singing "Jessie's Girl" at the 2013 Nurses' Ball.

== Storylines ==
=== 1981–83 ===
Soon after Dr. Noah Drake arrives at General Hospital in 1981, he gains a reputation of being a playboy. He becomes involved with nurse Bobbie Spencer, but she realizes he is unable to commit to her. She fakes blindness in order to keep him by her side, but the lies contribute to the end of their relationship. Dr. Noah Drake leaves Port Charles and General Hospital to take a new position at a hospital in Atlanta, GA as a way to give himself a fresh start in life.

=== 2005–13 ===
Drake returns to the show in late 2005. The character is no longer practicing medicine as he has become an alcoholic after his wife died on his operating table. Drake returns to town at the request of Robin Scorpio to aid her friend Jason Morgan, who had sustained severe brain damage. It is established that he is the father of Patrick Drake, a new, hot-shot doctor at General Hospital. Patrick helps to get his father sober and Noah begins practicing medicine again. Patrick also goes against his father's wishes and donates part of his liver when Drake falls ill and needs a liver transplant due to the years of heavy drinking.

Drake appears sporadically from 2005 until 2007. In 2007, rock star Eli Love (also played by Springfield) is brought to General Hospital needing emergency surgery, and coincidentally looks just like Drake. Love refuses surgery due to his upcoming charity concert for LifeBEAT, a real-life charity that uses the music industry to raise awareness for HIV and AIDS. Anna Devane convinces Drake to stand in for Love at the concert so that he can have the surgery. On August 23, 2007, Springfield sings on the show for the first time.

Drake appears again in 2008 when he is revealed to have had an affair that resulted in another son, Matt Hunter. In March 2012, Noah was working with Doctors Without Borders and upon the death of his daughter-in-law Robin Scorpio, he briefly returns to Port Charles to console Patrick. He returns again in April 2013 to attend the revived Nurses' Ball, being held in honor of his presumed-dead daughter-in-law Robin. He arranges for celebrity Rick Springfield to perform at the ball. Once the Nurse's Ball concludes, Drake runs into former girlfriend Bobbie Spencer as both board the same flight to Seattle, at which point Drake reveals to Spencer that he has accepted a job at the same hospital as her.

== Reception ==
Springfield had signed on to his role on General Hospital in 1981 before his widespread music fame, when his song "Jessie's Girl" hit No. 1 on the Billboard Hot 100 that summer. Some credit his appearance on GH as the reason behind his rise in popularity; the summer of 1981 was a peak time for General Hospital, pulling in 14 million viewers daily. Others credit the show and song simultaneously boosted the popularity of each other. Springfield told PopMatters.com that the soap opera most likely had more to do with his popularity than his MTV appearances. Springfield did not sing on the show during his 1980s stint, as the producers did not think it fit with the character.

During Springfield's reprisal in 2005, executive producer at the time Jill Farren Phelps said to the New York Times, "Rick is a special kind of a character, because he has this other career. There's a tremendous amount of nostalgia that surrounds Noah Drake and Rick Springfield." Springfield described the character's lasting popularity to E! Entertainment: "Thirty, 40 times a day I must get questions when I'm on the road about General Hospital or Noah Drake. It's constant," Springfield once told Soap Opera Weekly. "It amazes me that it's still so prevalent in the fans' minds."
