= Robin Scorpio =

Fictional character from General Hospital

- General Hospital character
- Portrayed by: Kimberly McCullough
- Duration: 1985–2001; 2004–2018; 2021
- First appearance: September 6, 1985
- Last appearance: May 21, 2021
- Created by: Pat Falken Smith and Norma Monty
- Introduced by: Gloria Monty (1985); Wendy Riche (1997); Jean Dadario Burke (2001); Jill Farren Phelps (2004); Frank Valentini (2012–2018, 2021)
- Book appearances: Robin's Diary; The Secret Life of Damian Spinelli
- Spin-off appearances: Port Charles; General Hospital: Night Shift
- Crossover appearances: All My Children
In-universe information
- Other names: Robin Soltini; Robin Scorpio-Drake; Nancy Greene
- Occupation: Neuropathologist; Medical consultant; Medical research; Chief of Staff
- Family: Scorpio
- Parents: Robert Scorpio; Anna Devane
- Adoptive parents: Mac Scorpio; Felicia Jones
- Half-sisters: Sasha Gilmore; Leora Hayward
- Spouse: Patrick Drake (2008–2014, 2016–present)
- Sons: Noah Drake II
- Daughters: Emma Drake
- Grandparents: Thomas John Devane; Filomena Soltini (adoptive)
- Uncles: Mac Scorpio; Gabriel Devane
- Aunts: Alex Devane; Lindsay Devane
- Nephews: Liam Corbin
- Nieces: Daisy Gilmore
- First cousins: Peter August; Maxie Jones (step); Georgie Jones (step); Aidan Devane; Cody Bell

Robin Scorpio is a fictional character from the ABC Daytime soap opera General Hospital and its primetime SOAPnet spin-off General Hospital: Night Shift, originated and portrayed by Kimberly McCullough on and off for over 30 years since 1985. The character came to mainstream attention during a 1990s story arc where her boyfriend Stone Cates dies from AIDS and Robin is diagnosed as HIV-positive. Robin is also famous in the soap community for having been one of the few long-term soap characters to age in real time, not SORASed like most other child actors.

== Casting ==
A 7-year-old McCullough was one of three actresses narrowed down for the part of 5-year-old Robin and was brought in to screen test with her on-screen parents Finola Hughes (Anna Devane) and Tristan Rogers (Robert Scorpio). Hughes recalled the event to MSN TV: "We just started improvising with her, like anything. We were throwing things at her and she was just talking away. Tristan and I were looking at each other over her head going, 'This is it! This is what we wanted.'" Improvisation skills were key for General Hospital's process in the 1980s. As Hughes explained: "It was very improvised. Very loose. We used to just talk around the plot and maybe every now and again dip our toe in the actual storyline."

McCullough debuted on September 6, 1985 and stayed with the series until September 12, 1996. Afterward, she returned as a series regular for brief stints: January 17, 1997 to February 3, 1997; March 12, 1997 to April 8, 1997; June 23, 1997 to August 8, 1997; December 11, 1997 to January 20, 1999; June 20–21, 2000 (for The Nurses' Ball); and July 16, 2004. She appeared on Port Charles in 1998, for one episode. She also appeared on May 30 to June 4, 2001 on All My Children when Robin reunited with her mother Anna. McCullough returned to General Hospital as Robin on July 16, 2004, for the funeral of Lila Quartermaine before rejoining the soap full-time on October 12, 2005. She also appeared on both seasons of the spin-off series General Hospital: Night Shift in 2007 and 2008.

For her work as Robin, McCullough has won two Daytime Emmy Awards, one for Outstanding Juvenile Female in 1989 and one for Outstanding Younger Actress in 1996. McCullough also earned two Soap Opera Digest Awards, for Outstanding Youth Actor/Actress in 1986 and Outstanding Child Actor in 1993, as well as the 1987 Young Artist Award.

In November 2011, McCullough announced her plans to leave General Hospital in the early months of 2012 to pursue her dream of directing full-time. This came only weeks after a controversial plot, where Lisa Niles (portrayed by Brianna Brown) threatens to inject Robin's blood into her husband, Patrick Drake, which was hard on McCullough and her co-star Jason Thompson considering Robin's critically acclaimed HIV-story. While the character was killed off on February 21, 2012, McCullough continued to make several appearances as an apparition in numerous scenes with her loved ones. Frank Valentini, Ron Carlivati, and McCullough discussed her departure, and Carlivati, who was uncomfortable with the idea of Robin being "completely dead", rewrote her story. McCullough's scene on March 27, 2012 showed Robin to be alive, leaving the door open for her to return.

On July 16, 2012, Soap Opera Digest announced that McCullough would return to the series for a series of guest spots. She started her series of guest starring spots on July 19, 2012 and lasted until July 27, 2012. In the fall of 2012, Soap Opera Digest confirmed that McCullough would reprise her role as Robin starting on November 6 until December 19, 2012. She guest-starred for one episode on March 25, 2013, in a video message Robin left for Patrick.

On August 21, 2013, Soap Opera Digest exclusively confirmed that McCullough had signed a contract to return to the series. McCullough made her on-screen return on September 30, 2013. In January 2014, McCullough confirmed her exit from the series once more, last airing on March 4, 2014. On June 23, 2014, McCullough revealed on her Twitter account that she's received GH scripts, this was later confirmed by Valentini that McCullough would be returning as Robin in the summer. Her first airdate back was on August 5, 2014 and she last aired on September 24, 2014. On January 19, 2015, McCullough guest-starred for one episode as Robin. In October 2015, it was announced that she would once again reprise the role of Robin in November. McCullough aired on November 13, 2015, and departed on January 7, 2016.

In April 2016, it was revealed that McCullough was to briefly return for The Nurses' Ball, first appearing on May 9 and departing on May 27. Later the same year, it was announced McCullough would again reprise the role, first appearing on October 27 and departing on November 1. She later reprised the role for another short guest arc, appearing from December 28, 2016, to January 19, 2017.

In 2017, McCullough made subsequent guest appearances from February 20 to March 10, May 18 and 19, and again from November 17 to December 4, as part of Steve Burton's return to the series.

The following year, McCullough appeared from February 6 to 13, and May 16 to 21. McCullough also made several appearances in June and September.

== Storylines ==
=== 1985–2001 ===
Robin Soltini arrives in Port Charles in 1985 with the woman she believes to be her grandmother, Filomena Soltini. She had grown up thinking her mother, Anna Devane, was a family friend. Her father, Robert Scorpio, has no idea that he shares a daughter with Anna and is surprised to find Robin in his living room. During her childhood, Robin's grandmother is killed and she is faced with threats from enemies of her parents such as Cesar Faison, Grant Putnam and Olivia St. John and she also faces tough times when her parents are supposedly murdered in a boat explosion in 1992, leaving her to be raised by her Uncle Mac Scorpio. Mac later marries Felicia Cummings, and Robin is raised with her daughters, Maxie and Georgie Jones.

In 1993, Robin meets Michael "Stone" Cates (Michael Sutton), and although they initially do not get along, they began dating in 1994 against her Uncle Mac's wishes. Stone had been a street kid now taken in and working for Sonny Corinthos (Maurice Benard). In 1995, Stone learns he is HIV+ and eventually contracts AIDS due to his length of time without treatment. After his first HIV test came back negative, he did not take another one six months later. Robin and her family are shocked to learn that she is also HIV+. Robin and Stone fall deeply in love, and she is devastated when Stone eventually dies from AIDS. Robin is at Jason Morgan (Steve Burton)'s bedside when he wakes up from a coma following a car accident caused by his brother A. J. Quartermaine (Sean Kanan). A few months later, they begin to bond and start dating. Jason helps Robin cope with Stone's death and her medical status, while Robin helps Jason cope with his memory loss following the accident. They fall in love despite protests from her uncle Mac Scorpio (John J. York). She introduces him to Sonny Corinthos, soon his employer, and the three become friends. Robin eventually enrolls in school at Yale, returning on weekends and holidays to visit. After an emotional break-up with Jason due to his involvement with the mob, Robin leaves Port Charles. She returns in 1998 to help her best friend Brenda Barrett (Vanessa Marcil) from her recent break-up. During this time, Robin becomes friends with Nikolas Cassadine (Tyler Christopher) and the two bond over their similar childhoods. Robin reconciles with Jason and they move in together with baby Michael, who Jason is taking care of for his friend Carly. However, their relationship begins to deteriorate when Carly moves home and into their cottage. Robin eventually reveals to Jason's brother A.J. (Billy Warlock) that he (and not Jason) is the father of Carly's son. Jason is furious and they end their relationship. Robin leaves town heartbroken in 1999, moving to Paris. She returns the following year for The Annual Nurses' Ball. In 2001, Robin travels to Pine Valley, Pennsylvania, where she is reunited with her mother Anna, who is revealed to be alive, having spent the past nine years recovering from her injuries. She also meets her aunt Alex Marick, Anna's identical twin sister. In 2003, Anna calls Robin to inform her that her half-sister, Leora, has died. Anna leaves Pine Valley that same year to live with Robin in Paris.

=== 2004–2021 ===
Robin returns to Port Charles in 2004 for Lila Quartermaine's funeral. She later returns the following year to help save Jason's life, and brings Patrick Drake (Jason Thompson) to town to operate. Robin and Patrick bicker and flirt, and eventually start dating despite Patrick's anti-commitment reputation. They work together during an encephalitis outbreak in February 2006. The crisis brings Robin's presumed-dead father to town, Robert Scorpio (Tristan Rogers), but he leaves shortly thereafter. Robin sees him again when she joins Lulu Spencer (then Julie Marie Berman) and Dillon Quartermaine (Scott Clifton) to the Markham Islands to rescue Robert and Luke Spencer (Anthony Geary). She also sees her mother Anna Devane, having previously found out she was alive and reunited with her in 2001 in Pine Valley. Meanwhile, Robin and Patrick admit their love for one another. In late 2006, they help Luke Spencer reconnect with his catatonic wife, Laura, with an experimental drug. In early 2007, Robin is part of a group held hostage at the Metro Court Hotel and is shot in the abdomen because the district attorney was Sonny's half-brother Ric Lansing (Rick Hearst). A few months later, Robin realizes she wants to have a child while Patrick strongly does not, and they break up after befriending Ric. In late 2007, after the funeral of her cousin Georgie Jones (Lindze Letherman), Robin goes to Patrick for comfort and they sleep together. Robin discovers she is pregnant, but does not tell Patrick since she had been planning on using a sperm donor. Patrick figures out the truth, and the couple slowly starts to become close again. In the summer of 2008, Robin's father is diagnosed with colon cancer but pulls through. Patrick proposes to Robin but she turns him down. They eventually plan an October wedding, which is cut short when Robin goes into labor. Robin names the baby Emma Grace Scorpio-Drake, who, after a brief scare, is shown not to be infected by Robin's HIV. Patrick and Robin wed the day after Christmas.

In early 2009, Robin begins suffering from postpartum depression. After months of refusing help, she agrees to treatment and eventually bonds with her daughter. In early 2010, Robin and Patrick begin to bicker. In June, Robin takes a trip to Africa to help with an AIDS program. Patrick is upset to not be included in her decision, and voices his jealousy over her connection to her late boyfriend Stone. The night Robin returns, Patrick sleeps with Lisa Niles (Brianna Brown). Lisa slowly begins to show her jealousy after Patrick refuses to sleep with her again. Lisa cuts Robin out of photos, steals Robin's HIV medicine and takes Emma from the babysitter. Patrick confesses his affair to Robin and she kicks him out of the house. She confronts Lisa, who then intentionally jumps in front of Robin's car and claims Robin tried to kill her. Lisa replaces Robin's medication with sedatives, resulting in Robin crashing her car. Lisa kidnaps her, and Robin escapes but falls in a well. Suffering from exhaustion and hypothermia, she hallucinates Stone. Patrick eventually finds Robin, with Lisa close after him. Lisa attempts to shoot herself and is sent to a mental institution. She returns shortly, having passed her psychiatric evaluations. After Emma's birthday party, a fire starts and Lisa saves Robin and Emma. Robin accuses Lisa of starting the fire, and Lisa petitions to have Robin fired. Robin's cousin Maxie Jones (Kirsten Storms) catches Lisa attempting to inject Robin's IV bag with sodium pentothal, and Lisa flees. She is put on probation and her petition against Robin is dismissed.

In early 2011, Robin serves as the maid of honor at Sonny's wedding to Brenda Barrett. Brenda is kidnapped and injected with a neurotoxin, and Robin saves her with an antidote. Patrick comforts Robin during the crisis and they begin to repair their relationship. When Jake Spencer is hit by a car and dies, Robin realizes life is short and reconciles with Patrick. Lisa attempts to kill Robin and frame Patrick, but they figure out her plan and she is arrested. In late June 2011, Lisa holds Robin, Patrick, Steve and Maxie hostage at General Hospital. Eventually there is a struggle where Lisa lets Patrick inject her with drain cleaner. She falls into a coma. Meanwhile, Robin is appointed Chief of Staff. When Jasper Jacks (Ingo Rademacher) kidnaps his daughter Josslyn Jacks, he goes to Robin for help. Sonny finds them and accidentally shoots Robin in the arm instead of Jax. In October, Robin and Patrick join Matt, Elizabeth, Steven Webber (Scott Reeves) and Olivia Falconeri (Lisa LoCicero) on a boat to celebrate Matt's medical achievement. Lisa sneaks on board and ties up Patrick and Robin. Lisa tries to inject Patrick with Robin's blood, but Robin and Lisa struggle and Lisa runs away. Lisa is found dead and everyone becomes suspects. In December, Robin tells Jason her HIV meds are not working. She later works on a protocol to save Jason, who is again experiencing head trauma. She is caught in a lab explosion and presumed dead, later seen being held captive. Her captor is seen to be Ewen Keenan (Nathin Butler), later revealed to be working for Jerry Jacks (Sebastian Roché) because she was rid of by Joe Scully, Jr. (Richard Steinmetz). She is later seen being held captive by Duke Lavery (Ian Buchanan), shown to be Cesar Faison (Anders Hove) in disguise. After Faison is apprehended, his accomplice Dr. Obrecht (Kathleen Gati) tries to kill Robin, and her father Robert catches her. They struggle and Robert is injected, falling into a coma. Obrecht escapes with Robin and takes her to Jerry.

Robin is revealed to be held on Cassadine Island by Jerry, forced to find a cure for Jerry's illness in late 2013. Robin is eventually found by Nikolas, who came to Cassadine Island to find Dr. Obrecht. However, Jerry manages to trap her parents, also pursuing Obrecht, and tells Robin to develop the cure or her parents will die. Robin is held captive on Wyndemere by Faison and Obrecht with Nikolas and Britt Westbourne (Kelly Thiebaud), Obrecht's daughter with Faison right where Stephen Clay (Michael Easton; AKA Caleb Morley) was. Robin finds out that Patrick is engaged to Sabrina Santiago (Teresa Castillo) after Carlos Rivera (Jeffrey Vincent Parise), Ava Jerome (Maura West), and Julian Jerome (William deVry) told Patrick and Sonny that they saw Robin alive. Britt offers to help her find the cure by getting her access to the hospital lab because Connie Falconeri (Kelly Sullivan) was killed. Anna and Robert manage to escape, overpower Jerry, and manage to capture Faison and Obrecht. Robin immediately leaves to go to Patrick and Sabrina's wedding ceremony, where she shares a reunion with Patrick and Emma. She also shares a reunion with Maxie, who was at the time, contemplating a suicide attempt. Meanwhile, Robin asks Sabrina to break up with Patrick, but Sabrina refuses, saying Patrick should make his own decision. Eventually, Patrick chooses Robin and they reunite in time to celebrate Christmas as a family with Emma and happy to see her longtime friend Sonny Corinthos after he got released from prison and meeting Obrecht from his cell. Robin applies to be the chief of staff, but before that, she told Sonny that she's very sorry for his loss, after she told him that, then she goes on to get that chief of staff position, but is overlooked, after Obrecht secures the position following her own deal with the WSB. Patrick and Robin find out Sabrina's pregnant, but she claims that Patrick is not the baby's father. Robin then gets a visit from Victor Cassadine (Thaao Penghlis), who reveals he's the WSB director who arranged Obrecht's release. He tells Robin he wants her to revive his sister-in-law, Helena (Constance Towers) and nephew, Stavros Cassadine (Robert Kelker-Kelly). After refusing to help Victor, he reveals that he has also been holding Jason, and that Robin could revive him as well, if she helped in resurrecting Helena and Stavros. They leave town together on March 4, 2014, and head to the Crichton-Clark Clinic in New York City and she hadn't got a chance to say goodbye to her longtime friend Sonny. Robin later confirms that Jason is indeed alive.

On August 5, 2014, Patrick runs into Robin at the Crichton-Clark Clinic. He was there with Sam Morgan looking for answers on a former patient, Nina Clay (Michelle Stafford). Robin tells him that she can't leave the clinic. Patrick then see a cryogenic chamber, and he asks if Jason is in there. Robin says that it is Stavros Cassadine, and that Jason is not there. She tells Patrick that Jason's organs were failing, and he soon died. Patrick then leaves after Robin says her work is more important than her family. Victor Cassadine later comes to the lab on August 7, 2014. He tells Robin that he hopes Patrick doesn't find out about Jason. It is confirmed that Jason indeed alive, and Robin lied to Patrick. Victor reveals he asked Rafe Kovich, Jr. (Jimmy Deshler) to run Patrick and Emma off the road as a warning to Robin, showing he's holding her hostage. The accident ultimately led to the death of Patrick's son, Gabriel. Robin last appears talking to Jason in the cryogenic chamber. At the clinic, Victor orders Robin to use her new concoction on Jason. But she prefers using it on his relatives, Helena Cassadine or Stavros Cassadine instead. Victor refuses, and orders her to try it on Jason first to see if he wakes up or not, before trying it on the Cassadines. Victor calls in his goons to hold back Robin while he tries her new formula on Jason by injecting him with the serum. Robin asks Victor to let her and Jason leave after her formula works and Jason moves his hand, but Victor has other plans for Jason and gets his goons to throw Robin out, betraying her by telling her he doesn't need her anymore as her work is done and he's planning to keep Jason. After the goons take Robin out, Jason commences to rise from the chamber.

== Reception ==
In 2023, Charlie Mason from Soaps She Knows placed Robin at #15 on his ranked list of General Hospital’s 40+ Greatest Characters of All Time, commenting that "Anna and Robert’s daughter is an inspiration, a cute kid who absorbed the blows that life dealt her — and there have been many! — to emerge on the other side a grown woman who is kindhearted, open-minded and far tougher than her warm smile might suggest." In 2024, Mason also placed Robin 33rd on his ranked list of Soaps' 40 Most Iconic Characters of All Time, writing, "Over the course of more than 30 years, we watched Kimberly McCullough grow up before our eyes and her character grow into a heroine for the ages".

== Robin's Diary ==
In November 1995, ABC Daytime Press released a book, Robin's Diary, written by Judith Pinsker, based on the storyline concerning Scorpio and Stone Cates. The work is written in a diary format and is based on the diary that the character keeps during her youth, which Scorpio gave to Cates at one point in the series. The book also includes items given to or created by Cates. Robin's Diary became a best seller and some of the book's royalties were donated to the Pediatric AIDS Foundation.

== See also ==
- Patrick Drake and Robin Scorpio
