= Patrick Drake =

Male characters in television

- General Hospital character
- Portrayed by: Jason Thompson; Ethan Erickson (temp. 2008)
- Duration: 2005–2016
- First appearance: December 7, 2005
- Last appearance: January 7, 2016
- Created by: Robert Guza, Jr. and Charles Pratt, Jr.
- Introduced by: Jill Farren Phelps
- Book appearances: The Secret Life of Damian Spinelli
- Spin-off appearances: General Hospital: Night Shift
In-universe information
- Occupation: Neurosurgeon
- Parents: Noah Drake; Mattie Drake
- Brothers: Matt Hunter
- Spouse: Robin Scorpio (2008–2014, 2016–present)
- Children: Emma Drake; Gabriel Santiago; Noah Scorpio Drake

Patrick Drake is a fictional character on the ABC soap opera General Hospital, a protagonist in both seasons of its prime time SOAPnet spin-off General Hospital: Night Shift and one half of on-screen couple Patrick Drake and Robin Scorpio. Jason Thompson originated the role in 2005. From April 23 to 28, 2008, the role of Patrick Drake was played by Ethan Erickson while Thompson was having minor surgery. In October 2015, it was announced that Thompson will be departing from the show, last appearing on January 7, 2016.

== Storylines ==
=== Backstory ===
Patrick was born in September 18, 1976 and grew up the only child of Noah (Rick Springfield) and Mattie Drake. He had a close relationship with both his parents and idolized his father, a successful surgeon. His mother was involved in an accident and his father operated on her. There were complications and she ended up dying on the table. Noah had a breakdown and became an alcoholic. Patrick did not have contact with his father for several years.

=== 2005–2009 ===
Dr. Patrick Drake comes to Port Charles when Jason Morgan (Steve Burton) needs surgery. Because his father Dr. Noah Drake could not perform the operation, Dr. Robin Scorpio (Kimberly McCullough) seeks Patrick out. Initially refusing, he agrees after Carly Corinthos (Laura Wright) and Sam McCall (Kelly Monaco) cast aspersions on his abilities as a surgeon. He soon begins seeing Robin but has flings with Carly, who uses him as a way of making Robin jealous. He constantly flirts with many of the hospital's nurses. After months of casually dating Robin, Patrick is exposed to HIV while performing surgery on a patient with AIDS. Robin helps in through the time in between his blood tests and they grow closer. Patrick admits his love to Robin after she makes an unrequested suggestion during a surgery. They are relieved six months later when Patrick is officially proven HIV-negative.

Robin voices her desire for children and a family, but Patrick doesn't want one. The two have a one-night stand on Georgie Jones' (Lindze Letherman) funeral night and Robin realizes she became pregnant after the police and mob found out that Georgie was strangled by Diego Alcazar (Ignacio Serricchio). Patrick, who thinks Robin had gone to a sperm bank, discovers that she is carrying his child. With the help of Robin's mother, Anna Devane (Finola Hughes), Patrick proposes, which Robin refuses. Weeks after learning they are having a daughter, Patrick and Robin attempt to wed on October 29, 2008 but after Robin goes into labour, she is admitted to the hospital, giving birth to Emma Grace Scorpio-Drake. Patrick discovers his father had another son, Matt Hunter (Jason Cook), who is a doctor at General Hospital. The two brothers bond, and Matt serves as the best man at Robin and Patrick's wedding on December 26, 2008.

Robin and Patrick face issues early on in their marriage, such as Robin's post-partum depression and the murder of the mayor's mistress that lead to Patrick being accused of medical malpractice. Patrick's ex-girlfriend from college, Lisa Niles (Brianna Brown), appears in town on a consult with Robin. She later transfers to General Hospital for a change of setting. Robin initially is apprehensive about this, but when Lisa loses a patient, she comforts her into believing she's not perfect. Robin and Emma leave on a trip to London to see Anna, and Patrick stays behind, though he misses both Robin and Emma every day. When he helps Lisa move into her new apartment, he realizes that she is making a play for him, and ends her hopes of getting back together with him when he tells her that he loves Robin, and nothing will change that.

Patrick and Robin begin to have a strained marriage afterwards during the trial of Robin's friend, Sonny Corinthos (Maurice Benard), for the murder of his wife, Claudia (Sarah Brown), as the well as the revelation that Sonny's son, Dante Falconeri (Dominic Zamprogna), was working undercover to bring Sonny down and then Sonny's niece Molly Lansing (Haley Pullos) framed Michael Corinthos (Drew Garrett) for that because Michael did it. When Robin leaves for Africa on assignment, Patrick sleeps with Lisa, and immediately regrets it. Lisa, though, becomes unhinged and hell-bent on breaking up Robin and Patrick's marriage after their one-night stand, intent on getting Patrick for herself. She tries to portray Robin as paranoid and crazy, and even uses Emma in a play for Patrick. Patrick eventually confesses his affair to Robin, separating them. Patrick desperately tries to save his marriage, and though they slowly start making amends, Robin is not ready to trust him again. Lisa still tries to make a play for Patrick, and ends up putting both Robin and Emma in danger. They try to fool Lisa into believing they're breaking up, but she figures out their scheme. Robin and Patrick finally reconcile after Elizabeth Webber's (Rebecca Herbst) son, Jake, dies in a hit-and-run, despite Robin and Patrick trying to save him.

Lisa later targets both Robin and Patrick, intending to destroy both of them once and for all. Robin and Patrick, though, figure out her schemes and get her caught in the act, leading to her being arrested. She breaks out of jail and targets them both during a hospital lockdown. She ends up in a coma after injecting herself with a toxic substance. Unknown to Patrick or Robin, Anthony Zacchara (Bruce Weitz) revives her and then lets her loose to terrorize Port Charles. She targets Patrick and Robin on a yacht, where they're holding a party for Matt. Lisa goes missing, and later ends up dead. Patrick is suspected as the killer, but it's later proven to be Matt, who agrees to a plea bargain and is sent to prison.

=== 2010–16 ===
After Robin died in an explosion at the hospital labs, Patrick received what he thought were Robin's ashes, and he took them to the plot of land that they were going to build their dream home on to say goodbye to her. At the same time that Patrick is saying goodbye, Robin is shown to be very much alive and held captive in an undisclosed location. Patrick falls into the early stages of addiction to a hallucinogenic pain-killer. Lulu Spencer (Julie Marie Berman) and Maxie Jones (Kirsten Storms) eventually intervene and get him to detox. Patrick befriends nursing student Sabrina Santiago (Teresa Castillo), but dates Britt Westbourne (Kelly Thiebaud), a fellow doctor. Britt rubbed Emma the wrong way, and Patrick would later overhear Britt insulting Emma; he immediately broke up with her. Patrick would help Sabrina revive the Nurses' Ball to honor Robin. The two would eventually start dating during the event. Britt revealed she was pregnant at the Ball. Doubts about the paternity of Britt's baby are raised by Patrick. A paternity test showed that Britt is carrying Patrick's child; however, it is revealed through a conversation between Britt and her mother, Dr. Liesl Obrecht (Kathleen Gati), that the baby is not Patrick's because Obrecht tampered with the test.

Patrick later finds out that Britt's mother is working with Cesar Faison (Anders Hove), a man who has targeted Robin's family and also trying to get revenge on Sonny Corinthos, and Britt was arrested as her accomplice. Patrick confronts Britt after she's released, and tells Britt that he's taking full custody of their child, and Britt finally admits that she's not carrying Patrick's baby. Patrick is visibly hurt by this. He has other issues to deal with, though, when Sabrina's ex-boyfriend, Carlos Rivera (Jeffrey Vincent Parise), comes to town wanting Sabrina back. Patrick decides to move on with Sabrina when he proposes to her, and she accepts. Meanwhile, Robin gets back to Port Charles, but is held in captivity. Patrick got a visit from Ava (Maura West) who tells him that Carlos saw Robin alive. She is finally rescued by her parents, and Patrick is reunited with his wife at his wedding to Sabrina. Though initially conflicted, Patrick eventually decides to stay with Robin.

Patrick thinks about having another baby, though Robin declines, and Patrick agrees to let the discussion go. Soon after, Patrick and Robin learn that Sabrina is pregnant. When he confronts her about this, Sabrina tells him that Carlos is the baby's father. Later, Patrick finds out Obrecht has been hired as the new chief of staff, and is furious she got away with hurting Robin. Meanwhile, Sabrina admits to Patrick that she lied, and he is the father of her baby after Robin left Port Charles again. On April 16, 2014 Patrick and Sabrina find out that they are having a boy. On April 25, Sabrina, Patrick and Emma were involved in a car accident which caused Sabrina to go into labor and deliver their son. They were rushed to the hospital after the birth and Heather Webber (Robin Mattson)'s arrest.

On May 27, 2014, Patrick and Sabrina name their son. The boy was named Gabriel Drake Santiago, named for his maternal grandmother, his father and his half-sister. After the baby came too early, he died of massive organ failure due to necrotizing enterocolitis. He and Sam found out the car that drove Patrick and Sabrina off the road belonged to Silas Clay (Michael Easton), but Silas didn't do it. Rafe Kovich, Jr. (Jimmy Deshler) was responsible. Rafe went on the run to evade police and got into a crash injuring both Molly and himself, not even Molly's cousins Michael (Chad Duell) nor Morgan Corinthos (Bryan Craig) could've stopped Rafe before the crash happened. Patrick is forced to operate on Rafe, but Rafe doesn't make it. Patrick is fired because of a struggle with his conscience during surgery and he later learns someone put Rafe up to running his family off the road.

== See also ==
- Patrick Drake and Robin Scorpio
