= Mac Scorpio =

Fictional character from General Hospital

- General Hospital character
- Portrayed by: John J. York
- Duration: 1991–present
- First appearance: February 14, 1991
- Created by: Gene Palumbo
- Introduced by: Gloria Monty
- Book appearances: Robin's Diary; The Secret Life of Damian Spinelli
- Spin-off appearances: General Hospital: Twist of Fate (1996); Port Charles; General Hospital: Night Shift
- Crossover appearances: All My Children
In-universe information
- Other names: Malcolm Scorpio
- Occupation: Manager/Bartender at The Floating Rib; Police Chief of Port Charles; Private Investigator; Owner of the Outback
- Family: Scorpio/Jones family
- Brothers: Robert Scorpio
- Wife: Felicia Scorpio (1998–2001, 2013–present)
- Sons: Cody Bell
- Stepdaughters: Maxie Jones; Georgie Jones
- Grandchildren: Georgie Spinelli (step); James West (step); Bailey Louise Jones (step)
- Nieces: Robin Scorpio; Sasha Gilmore

Mac Scorpio is a fictional character from General Hospital, an American soap opera on the ABC network. The role was originated by John J. York in February 1991. He was introduced as the brother of Robert Scorpio, and later became the guardian of Robert's daughter, Robin Scorpio, after Robert and his wife Anna Devane were presumed dead. He is the husband of Felicia Scorpio-Jones, the stepfather of Maxie and Georgie Jones, and father of Cody Bell.

== Casting ==
York was hired by returning executive producer, Gloria Monty in December 1990. York made his first appearance on February 14, 1991. York had previously auditioned for two other roles on GH but was rejected. In late 1999, it was reported that York could possibly depart from the series as he was in contract negotiations. However, York renewed his contract for another year. In November 2001, York was taken off contract and began appearing on a recurring basis. In the spring of 2003, York re-signed with the series and began appearing on a contractual basis once again. York was once again dropped from contract status, in November 2014, following confirmation from the series. York crossed over to All My Children on October 8, 2001, when Mac learned his former sister-in-law Anna Devane (Finola Hughes) was alive.

== Development ==
The character was introduced as a plot device by Monty to delve into Robert Scorpio's (Tristan Rogers) background. The character was described as "shifty" and "unreliable" who Robert holds a grudge against. Despite his brother initially hating him, Mac never becomes a villain, and he even manages to rebuild his relationship with his brother. Prior to his Port Charles arrival, Mac works as a hired hand on boating trips. York got help from Rogers on his Australian accent. However, Monty advised him to worry more about the scene than the accent which has since taken a back seat. Nancy Reichardt described Mac as being "carefree" and "mischievous." According to York, in response to Mac's sudden infatuation with Dominique Stanton (Tawny Fere Ellis), Mac has an "accessibility to love right now." York implied that this behavior stems from Mac's time as a longshoreman.

== Storylines ==
1991–92

Mac Scorpio (John J. York) arrived in Port Charles in 1991 aboard the Quartermaine-owned ship S.S. Tracy. When the ship exploded in the harbor, Mac was rescued by Police Commissioner Robert Scorpio, his estranged brother. The two clashed immediately, with Robert blaming Mac for their parents’ and his fiancée Lily’s deaths in a plane crash years earlier. Initially accused of plotting against Robert and later charged with attempted murder, Mac cleared his name after the brothers reconciled. He later opened the nightclub The Outback and became romantically involved with Dominique Taub, whom he helped escape an abusive marriage. Their relationship ended when Mac assumed guardianship of Robert’s daughter Robin following Robert and Anna Devane’s presumed deaths.

1993–98

Throughout the mid-1990s, Mac balanced raising Robin with his own personal life. He became closely involved with Felicia Jones, helping her expose serial killer Ryan Chamberlain. The pair developed a romantic relationship and eventually became partners in a private investigation business. Their planned wedding was interrupted multiple times, including by Ryan’s escape, but they ultimately married in 1998. During this time, Mac also supported Robin through her relationship with Stone Cates, who died of AIDS. After Stone’s death, Robin tested HIV positive, and Mac played a key role in her care and adjustment.

1998–2002

Mac’s marriage to Felicia faced strain when she began working closely with Luke Spencer. Though Mac forgave Felicia after learning of her near-affair with Luke, their marriage collapsed after Felicia testified she had been with Luke on the night Stefan Cassadine was presumed murdered. Heartbroken, Mac resigned as commissioner briefly but later returned to the role. During this period, he also raised Felicia’s daughters, Maxie and Georgie, treating them as his own children even after his split from Felicia.

2002–04

As commissioner, Mac investigated the murder of arms dealer Luis Alcazar and continued to be a central figure in law enforcement. With Felicia absent caring for her grandmother in Texas, Mac became the primary parent for Maxie and Georgie. He struggled with Maxie’s rebellious behavior, including underage drinking and a near-fatal drug overdose, and clashed with Georgie over her relationship with Dillon Quartermaine. In 2004, Mac was gravely injured during the Port Charles Hotel fire but survived with the support of his daughters and Felicia.

2005–present

Mac has continued to serve as commissioner while remaining a stabilizing figure for Robin, Maxie, and Georgie. He has frequently clashed with Sonny Corinthos, Jason Morgan, and other members of Port Charles’ criminal underworld. In 2008, York reprised the role on the spin-off General Hospital: Night Shift, where Mac supported Robert during his battle with cancer. In later years, Mac has been portrayed as both a steady law enforcement presence and a devoted guardian, often stepping in as a father figure when Felicia was absent from her daughters’ lives.

== Reception ==
By the summer of 1991, York had become one of the top stars in daytime TV.
