= Britt Westbourne =

Fictional character from General Hospital

- General Hospital character
- Portrayed by: Kelly Thiebaud
- Duration: 2012–2015; 2017–2018; 2020–2023; 2025–present
- First appearance: September 19, 2012
- Created by: Ron Carlivati
- Introduced by: Frank Valentini
In-universe information
- Other names: Britta Westbourne; Theresa James; Rita Jenkins
- Occupation: Chief of Staff of General Hospital (2020–2023); Endocrinologist; OB/GYN
- Parents: Cesar Faison; Liesl Obrecht
- Brothers: Nathan West; Cassius Faison
- Half-brothers: Peter August
- Grandparents: Emil Krieg; Sybil McTavish
- Aunts: Madeline Reeves
- Nephews: James West
- Nieces: Louise Jones
- First cousins: Nina Reeves; Nathan West (adoptive)
- Other relatives: Nelle Benson; Willow Tait

Britt Westbourne is a fictional character from General Hospital, an American soap opera on the ABC network, portrayed by Kelly Thiebaud. She was introduced by executive producer Frank Valentini on September 19, 2012, as the manipulative love interest for Patrick Drake. In 2014, Thiebaud exited the role, citing her desire to seek work in both film and primetime television. She reprised the role on several occasions, between 2015 and 2018, for limited-run guest appearances. In March 2020, Thiebaud returned for another guest stint; by September of the same year, she returned to the role once more. She exited the role in 2023 after deciding it was time pursue other opportunities. She returned to the role in 2025.

Britt is known for her "bitchy" attitude, characterized as an "evil" villainess. The term "Britch" (A combination of Britt and Bitch) has become widely popular when referring to the character, either in the show's script or on social media. The role was initially viewed as being pointless and short-term. However, Britt's unfolding storyline—which revealed her to be the daughter of super-villain parents Cesar Faison and Liesl Obrecht—has garnered Thiebaud praise for making her nastiness believable, with Daytime Confidential calling her a "natural". While enjoying the "nasty" sides of Britt, Thiebaud was pleased to portray the character's layers. Britt died in 2023.

Thiebaud's performance has been met with critical acclaim, winning the Daytime Emmy Award for Outstanding Supporting Actress in a Drama Series in 2022.

== Casting and creation ==
Actress Kelly Thiebaud first auditioned for an unspecified contract role, but the producers of General Hospital felt that she wasn't right for the part. However, they were impressed by her and decided to give her the part of a recurring character that they were in the process of writing, who they characterized as a "bitchy" doctor. Thiebaud described the casting process as a "surprise". She debuted as Dr. Britt Westbourne on September 19, 2012. Thiebaud previously had minor acting credits on the NBC soap opera Days of Our Lives and primetime series Criminal Minds. Apart from her acting work, she also modeled and appeared in four music videos for French disc jockey David Guetta.

A month into filming, Thiebaud received news that she had been placed on contract. During an interview with Star Pulse, she confessed that she was shocked, because she felt that she wasn't doing well in the role due to nerves, in addition to the fast-paced nature of the genre. In February 2013, Soap Opera Digest confirmed that the actress had been upgraded to a contract status. In early 2013, Thiebaud fractured her femur and was forced to sport crutches. Instead of resting the character, head writer Ron Carlivati wrote it into the script as Britt suffering a fall in the hospital parking lot at the possible hands of Frisco Jones (Jack Wagner), the father of Maxie Jones, whom Britt blackmailed. Thiebaud thanked Carlivati and executive producer Frank Valentini for letting her "crutch on TV". On the set of General Hospital, Thiebaud met her former real-life boyfriend Bryan Craig, who portrayed Morgan Corinthos.

On November 10, 2014, it was reported that Thiebaud had been placed on recurring status following the conclusion of her two-year contract, in order to pursue other acting opportunities. However, it later appeared that Thiebaud would be exiting the series, and her last scenes aired on December 8, with Britt leaving town. Her departure was not confirmed until this date. Upon the airing of her final scenes, the actress revealed on Instagram, "I decided not to [re-sign] my contract because I would like to book other roles on prime time shows and film", and described her experience on the soap as "(sic) a fun and challenging adventure". The actress returned for a brief appearance in April 2015. She said that "It was just a case of getting used to that [taping] speed again", and is open to future appearances.

In November 2017, it was revealed that Thiebaud would once again reprise the role for a limited run. She returned on December 8 and departed on December 19. In September 2018, it was reported that Thiebaud would make another return to the show. Thiebaud returned on October 29, 2018. In March 2020, it was announced that Thiebaud was back filming in the role of Britt, returning during the final moments of the March 11 episode and exited following the April 1 episode. In August of the same year, it was announced she would again reprise the role, returning during the September 11, 2020, episode. She was later upgraded to a regular. In August 2022, it was announced that she will leave the role again. Thiebaud departed the role on January 4, 2023.

In June 2025, it was announced Thiebaud was returning to General Hospital, although, the specifics of her return were not disclosed to press. Upon her episodic return on July 18, it still was not known if she were reprising Britt or was a new character. Five days later, it was announced she was in fact portraying Britt once again.

== Character development ==
=== Characterization and family ===
Britt's manipulative, untruthful personality has led her to be nicknamed the "Britch" or "Dr. Britch" in the show's dialogue and social media. Thiebaud has stated: "I love going to work and getting to play someone that I am not. It’s really fun to do." She has expressed her pleasure in playing a "bad" character. Although, despite the fact that she "loves playing a villain", she stated: "I would really love for my character to fall in love, [and] have a romance", wanting Britt to "redeem herself". Thiebaud also hoped that audiences would fall for the character and understand her more. Head writer Ron Carlivati characterized Britt during an interview with Soap Opera Digest as a "villainous", while On-Air On-Soaps refers to her as an "evil Britch". Luke Kerr of the entertainment website Zap2it described her as "Britchtastic", while also acknowledging her "human side".

"Playing Britt has just been a good time. Something you can't do as an actor is judge your character, but it's very easy to do that. At times I'd catch myself [saying] 'I can't understand why Patrick would want to be with me! I'm a horrible person!' But she's so fun. I'm so blessed to play someone so interesting and so layered and so expressive."

— Thiebaud, on playing Britt (2013)

Britt's "nefarious" behavior is attributed to her "manipulative mother and psycho father," being the daughter of Cesar Faison (Anders Hove) and Dr. Liesl Obrecht (Kathleen Gati); who was involved in the presumed death and kidnapping of Robin Scorpio (Kimberly McCullough). Upon the reveal that Dr. Obrecht was Britt's mother, Thiebaud stated: "Recently, my mother got revealed and that was probably something that I'd been waiting for since I got on a contract [...] I wanted to show the audience something other than this kind of bitchy, mean, selfish, conniving person and I'm really glad that slowly these layers are being shown." During an episode of the series, Britt ends up confiding in one of her enemies (and Sabrina's best friend) Felix DuBois (Marc Anthony Samuel), informing him that she is a caring person though has developed an "unlikable personality" due to her "super-villain parents", after he calls her a "Britch" to her face. Thiebaud did not "want to play this one layer of her just being a shark and a bitch" and was pleased that the character's back-story explained her "lack of love, and lack of empathy from other people, and kind of not knowing how to deal with and interact with people". She noted that "No one is just a bitch. There are always reasons behind that." Upon the character's exit in December 2014, On-Air On-Soaps wrote, "Britt was truly a bad girl, a very bad girl, only she ended up humanized along the way."

=== Relationships and schemes ===
Liesl and Britt scheme to ensure that Britt will have a relationship with Robin's husband Dr. Patrick Drake (Jason Thompson), though their short-lived romance ends and he began dating Sabrina Santiago (Teresa Castillo), Britt's archenemy. At the 2013 Nurses Ball, she reveals that she is pregnant with Patrick's child, and begins attempting to break up Patrick and Sabrina. Speaking of the brief relationship between Britt and Patrick, Jason Thompson told TV Buzz: "I think Patrick and Britt had some real moments in the beginning and he hasn't seen all the things that she's done. I'm not convinced he knows she's as conniving as everyone else says she is." Speaking of the direction for her character, Thiebaud hoped that Robin would return so that there could be "that whole showdown" that will "shake things up incredibly". In addition, she hoped that Britt's relationship with Nikolas Cassadine (Tyler Christopher) would "grow closer". Thiebaud was a fan of Christopher's and said she was "star-struck" when she first met him. She felt that Nikolas and Britt's friendship was "very special", saying: "It doesn’t make any sense why this person would continue to look past her flaws and mistakes, while everyone else wants to stay away from Britt. But, Nikolas is continuing to be there for Britt, like no else before has."

Britt later moves in with Nikolas and when she goes into labor, Sabrina delivers her baby (after it was revealed that Patrick is not the child's father). She gives birth to a son, Ben. Thiebaud described the scenes where Britt confesses to Patrick that he isn't her baby's father as "anxiety-filled and emotion filled". Britt later develops a romantic relationship with Nikolas and the couple get engaged. At their engagement party, Elizabeth Webber (Rebecca Herbst), another one of Britt's rivals, exposes who Ben's real parents are: Lulu Spencer (Emme Rylan) and Dante Falconeri (Dominic Zamprogna); with Britt having stolen their embryo. Nikolas breaks up with Britt. The couple rekindle their romance after Britt proves to be a "solid support system" for Nikolas when his son Spencer (Nicolas Bechtel) goes missing. However, Britt confesses to him that she played a role in Spencer's disappearance to get him back and they break up again. Nikolas presses charges against Britt and she flees town. Head writer Ron Carlivati explained: "It was sad, but we had the story set up such that Britt’s life would have to blow up if Nikolas found out her latest deception. So, we had this escape hatch already when Kelly decided she was not going to sign a new contract." Speaking of Britt's close bond with Spencer, Carlivati said that the relationship "is a loss, but it is allowing us to spin Nikolas in a new direction". Britt also has a friendship with Brad Cooper (Parry Shen) who had previously played a role in her baby scheme. Carlivati called this an "unexpected friendship" that the "audience really respond to", noting that "Here these characters started out as schemers, who were sort of using each other, and a real friendship was built."

== Storylines ==
Britt Westbourne first appears at General Hospital, where she develops an attraction for fellow doctor Patrick Drake (Jason Thompson), who is still grieving the death of his wife Robin Scorpio (Kimberly McCullough). She is intent on starting a serious relationship with him following a few dates, and appoints nurse Sabrina Santiago (Teresa Castillo) to look after his daughter Emma Drake (Brooklyn Rae Silzer). Britt notices that Sabrina has a crush on Patrick, but initially doesn't view it as a threat. Patrick and Sabrina develop feelings for each other, which strengthens once he dumps Britt for being rude and calling his daughter names. Britt manipulatively attempts to destroy Sabrina's career as a nurse by blackmailing one of her patients, Maxie Jones (Kirsten Storms), into sabotaging Sabrina. The effort fails when Maxie's father Frisco Jones (Jack Wagner) threatens Britt, freeing Maxie of Britt's blackmail. Britt later sets up Sabrina to appear that she cheated on a nursing test, though she is caught and Sabrina graduates as a nurse. Britt ends up getting help from her mother, Liesl Obrecht (Kathleen Gati), who is even more intent on Britt being with Patrick, threatening to kill her own daughter if she doesn't improve her tactics. To the shock of audiences, it is learned that Britt's father is criminal and longtime villain Cesar Faison (Anders Hove).

Britt and her mother's master plan is revealed when Britt takes the stage at the Nurse's Ball to inform Patrick, Sabrina and Emma that she is pregnant with his child. Britt later, with the help of the sleazy lab technician Brad Cooper (Parry Shen), fakes hyperemesis gravidarum so Patrick will take her in, but she instead moves in with Sabrina and fellow nurse Felix Dubois (Marc Anthony Samuel) for her fake bed-rest, inflicting hell on them. However, Britt becomes fast friends with Felix's sister Taylor DuBois (Samantha Logan). A paternity test demanded by Sabrina and Felix seemingly proves that Patrick is the father of Britt's baby, though it is later revealed that Liesl switched the results, and the child isn't Patrick's. During the middle of this, Britt also befriends Nikolas Cassadine (Tyler Christopher), who she develops potential feelings for. When Patrick finds out who Britt's mother is, he tells Britt he's filing for sole custody of the baby. Britt finally admits that she isn't carrying Patrick's baby, and when Patrick presses, she tells him that Brad donated his sperm to her so she could get pregnant. Soon after, she goes into labor, and Sabrina and Nikolas end up delivering her son, whom she names Ben.

Obrecht ends up kidnapping Ben soon after he is born, and Nikolas and Britt go to his family compound, Cassadine Island, in Greece when they get a lead on her. There, she finds Faison with her son, and eventually gets Ben back. Britt also finds out Robin is alive and being held captive by her parents. Britt is held hostage with Nikolas and Robin in Port Charles by her parents unless Robin finds a way to cure Jerry Jacks (Sebastian Roché) of his poisoning. Britt offers to help Robin with this, and finds out Patrick and Sabrina are engaged. Robin becomes desperate to find a cure in order to stop the wedding. Britt's parents are eventually caught, and Britt and the others are freed. Britt and Nikolas eventually start a relationship after the ordeal. However, Britt's newfound happiness is put in jeopardy by her mother, who blackmails Britt into helping her get released from jail. It's revealed that Britt actually stole the embryos of Dante Falconeri (Dominic Zamprogna) and his wife Lulu Spencer (Emme Rylan) in order to impregnate herself, and Ben is actually Dante and Lulu's son. Britt is afraid she'll lose Nikolas because Lulu is his sister. After she and Nikolas get engaged, the truth is revealed, and Nikolas dumps Britt. Obrecht steals Ben when the truth is revealed, and tries to help Britt leave town with him. Instead, Britt turns her mother into the police, and gives Ben back to Dante and Lulu.

Despondent over losing Ben and Nikolas, Britt drowns her sorrows at the bar, and ends up meeting Nathan West (Ryan Paevey). She stays at his apartment for the night, though they don't sleep together. The next day, she finds out that Nathan is actually her brother, who Liesl gave to her sister and Britt's aunt, Madeline Reeves (Donna Mills), to raise. The two try to form some kind of bond. Liesl also tries to bond with her children, but Britt is not willing to forgive her mother as easily for not just lying, but for belittling her constantly. Britt decides to try and win Nikolas back with the help of his son, Spencer. Spencer disappears, making it look like he was kidnapped, so that Britt can find him and be a hero. Though Britt was not the one who found Spencer, it still draws Nikolas and Britt back together. However, Liesl blackmails Britt with Spencer's kidnapping in order to help Faison hide from the police. Britt refused, and instead confesses the truth to Nikolas. Furious, Nikolas threatens to call the cops on Britt. She left, and met her parents at the dock, where they were planning to escape together. She decided to go with them, but Obrecht changed her mind and stayed when she found out Nathan was injured. Britt and Faison leave Port Charles, going on the run together.

Britt briefly returned almost a year later to watch the Nurses' Ball with Brad, and catch up with Obrecht. She also visited Spencer, who was recovering from injuries sustained during a fire, before departing Port Charles again. In 2017, Britt is located by Sonny Corinthos (Maurice Benard) and Jason Morgan (Steve Burton), when she is questioned concerning the whereabouts of Faison; following, Britt returns to Port Charles and turns herself into the PCPD, where she is then escorted off to prison. The following year, she agrees to help Anna Devane (Finola Hughes) track down her mother, in exchange for her release from prison. With the assistance of Hamilton Finn (Michael Easton), Britt is able to convince Obrecht to return to Port Charles; following her mother's capture and her own release, Britt leaves town.

In March 2020, Britt returns to Port Charles, surprising Brad at his court hearing after Shiloh's (Coby Ryan McLaughlin) death; upon her return, she is temporarily re-hired back at General Hospital, following the re-instatement of her medical license, as an interim replacement for Kim Nero (Tamara Braun). She leaves town upon receiving and accepting a job offer in Boston. In September, Britt returns to Port Charles again where she becomes the Chief of Staff at General Hospital by Chairman of the Board Cyrus Renault (Jeff Kober) from Seattle in the Pacific Northwest who bores an uncanny resemblance to her late father.

== Reception ==
"Britt, who started out as a one note bitch, became interesting. We learned that she is uber-villain Faison’s daughter and that her mother, Olbrecht, has Robin imprisoned in a European sanitarium. Britt is no longer some random doctor who ended up in Upstate New York. She has connections to the show’s history. It seems that her mother pressured her to pursue Patrick, and conceive a child with him, as part of a larger evil scheme. It both makes her smarter and more sympathetic. Deep down, she just wants to make her mother happy, and is hurt that not even getting pregnant made Patrick like her."

— Sara Bibel, Xfinity (2013)

On-Air On-Soaps wrote that the actress "won fans and critics alike over with her multi-dimensional performance as Dr. Britt Westbourne". Speaking of the character's progression, soap journalist Michael Fairman said she went from "the ultimate bitch, to being pregnant, to now actually having many fans rooting for her". Jamey Giddens of Daytime Confidential was receptive of the character, and upon news of Thiebaud being placed on contract with the series, wrote: "I couldn't be happier about this news. While I didn't see the point of Britt or Sabrina early on, the story has hooked me over the past few weeks. [Thiebaud] is a natural at playing a bitch-goddess-in-training." Brittany Frederick of Star Pulse said of Thiebaud: "With her positive energy and commitment to her craft, Kelly is well on her way to a long career. She might be playing a woman audiences love to hate, but there's plenty to love about her." Maria Ciaccia of About.com described the character as "nasty and horrible" as well as "the woman we love to hate" though stated that "Thiebaud deserves applause for convincing audiences of Britt's nastiness." Ciaccia had previously unfavorably described Britt as "Another manipulative woman after Patrick" who she would vote "off the island". In a poll conducted by About.com in regards to which General Hospital storyline viewers were most interested, the option of "How Robin's kidnapping ties in with Britt hooking up with Patrick" received the most votes, with 27%. Luke Kerr (also of Zap2it) was receptive of Britt's potential pairing with the character Nikolas Cassadine (Tyler Christopher) stating that "A Faison and Cassadine romantic pairing could be hot" and they "could become Port Charles’ next, great twisted power couple".

The humorous side of Britt's inability to get along with Patrick's daughter Emma was demonstrated when Britt accidentally throws Emma's wet doll (named Baby Ariel) into a grill, causing it to catch fire during a 4th of July barbecue. The scene was shown on the E! television series The Soup!, which recaps popular culture television moments of the week. Presenter Tim Jennings stated: "Not everyone is good with kids [...] In fact, if you don’t have one and aren’t used to interacting with them, a conversation with a random child can end up feeling awkward. If this ever happens to you, don’t despair. At the very least, it will never be as bad as what happened to Britt on ‘General Hospital’ this week". Jennings jokingly stated: "Don’t worry, Baby Ariel. Soaps always bring characters back from the dead." The scene has been described as an "instant classic". Later, Violette DeSantis of SheKnows Media compiled a poll of characters that have "been pulling at our heartstrings. Characters we like and dislike have shared their intimate thoughts. While watching a few confront their inner demons or confess their feelings to others we might have felt deeply moved to hug one or two of them", with Britt included."

Charlie Mason and Richard Simms from Soaps She Knows called the Britt's 2023 departure the "Worst Exit" in American soap operas of that year, questioning why they would kill off a character "with as much potential as O'Brecht's daughter", though they acknowledged that her "Swan song" was "dramatic".
