= Madeline Reeves =

Fictional character from General Hospital

- General Hospital character
- Portrayed by: Donna Mills
- Duration: 2014–2015; 2018
- First appearance: March 14, 2014
- Last appearance: August 20, 2018
- Created by: Ron Carlivati
- Introduced by: Frank Valentini
In-universe information
- Other names: Magda Westbourne; Madeline West; Dr. Mooney
- Occupation: Socialite
- Sisters: Liesl Obrecht
- Husband: Dan Reeves
- Daughters: Nina Reeves
- Adoptive sons: Nathan West
- Grandchildren: James West (adoptive); Nelle Benson; Willow Tait
- Nephews: Nathan West
- Nieces: Britt Westbourne

Madeline Reeves is a fictional character on the long-running ABC daytime soap opera General Hospital, portrayed by Donna Mills, who made her appearance on March 14, 2014. The casting was announced in January 2014. Madeline was introduced as the estranged mother-in-law of Dr. Silas Clay (Michael Easton) and mother of Silas' comatose wife Nina Reeves (Michelle Stafford) and, biological aunt of Nathan West (Ryan Paevey) — whom she raised as her own. Madeline is also revealed to be the estranged sister of established character Dr. Liesl Obrecht (Kathleen Gati) having remade herself. Mills wrapped her initial stint in May 2014. Though the character was supposed to be short-term, Mills reprised the role of Madeline from October 2014 to January 2015. The character once again resurfaced in May 2015. Her returns have centered on Madeline's attempts to get back in her son's good graces and get her hands on the family fortune.

The character was created by head writer Ron Carlivati and patterned after Mills' iconic Knots Landing character, Abby Cunningham. The casting was very well received despite her character's name and backstory remaining a secret until her debut. On-Air On-Soaps referred to the news as "bombshell", while Jamey Giddens of Daytime Confidential raved about the casting choice and said Mills' character would definitely make for "must see" TV. Mills won the Daytime Emmy Award for Outstanding Special Guest Performer in a Drama Series in 2015.

== Storylines ==
Madeline comes to Port Charles in March 2014 demanding that Silas Clay (Michael Easton) sign over his claim to her comatose daughter's estate. Madeline is soon revealed to be the mother of Nathan West (Ryan Paevey), the man investigating Nina's 20-year-old attempted murder case. Madeline claims that Nina has recently died from pneumonia and a devastated Silas finally signs the papers. When Nathan sets a trap to catch Nina's killer, Madeline herself falls into the trap. She admits to overdosing Nina to kill her unborn child because said child would have inherited Nina's estate. While in jail, Madeline reunites with her estranged sister Liesl Obrecht (Kathleen Gati) and she is forced to reveal that Liesl is actually Nathan's biological mother after he nearly sleeps with Liesl's daughter Britt Westbourne (Kelly Thiebaud). Just before she is extradited to New York to stand trial, Madeline informs Nathan that Nina (Michelle Stafford) is very much alive.

Having avoided conviction, Madeline returns in October 2014 and reveals to Nathan and Liesl that Nina has been faking her injuries and that Nina also secretly controls the family estate. Madeline explains that Nina has been unstable since she was a child and is prone to violence. Nina confronts Madeline and threatens her until Madeline agrees to help her kidnap Ava Jerome (Maura West)'s newborn baby. They manage to get away only for Nina to double cross Madeline knocking her unconscious. She is discovered and sent to the hospital where she is immediately placed under arrest. As Madeline is transferred to prison, she is stunned when Nathan claims Victor Cassadine (Thaao Penghlis) as his father. Madeline then blackmails Liesl threatening to expose Nathan's true paternity unless she agrees to testify on Nina's behalf to keep her out of prison. Madeline is used as a diversion when Ava and several others prisoners escape.

In June 2015, Madeline is still in prison due to the belief that she was involved in the previous prison break. It is revealed that she is conspiring with attorney Ric Lansing (Rick Hearst) to get released and gain access to the family's money. After Ric's unsuccessful attempt to double cross Madeline by revealing that he has married Nina, Madeline orders him to secure her release. Upon her release, Madeline claims that she no longer cares about the money and hides the fact that Ric is working for her. Madeleine and Ric begin sleeping together as he succeeds in obtaining Nina's power of attorney, and tricking her into getting herself committed by leading her to believe she kidnapped Ava's daughter again. Meanwhile, Madeline clashes with Nathan's girlfriend Maxie Jones (Kirsten Storms). On August 31, Madeline is revealed to be Silas' killer and Ric tricks her into confessing when he wears a wire. Madeline is devastated to learn Nathan is behind her arrest and tries to sway Nina to her side in a last ditch effort to save herself. Nina disowns Madeline for her greed and tells her she hates her as she is sent off to prison. However, Madeline warns Nina that she will return.

== Development ==
=== Casting and creation ===
It was initially rumored that Shirley Jones would play the mystery role but Jones's appearance on the series turned out to be a bit role. On January 17, 2014, executive producer Frank Valentini teased "major casting news" on Twitter. Shortly after, Entertainment Weekly exclusively confirmed that Donna Mills known for her legendary role as Abby Cunningham on Knots Landing had joined the cast of General Hospital in a mystery role. Mills first airdate was slated for late February 2014. Mills later revealed that Valentini had asked her to keep the details of her character private. On February 25, Mills announced her first airdate on Twitter. Valentini told Soaps In Depth that the show's head writer Ron Carlivati suggested Mills specifically. "I am thrilled out of my mind" Carlivati said of the casting decision. The writer admitted that it was just wishful thinking on his part and Valentini told him he'd look into it. Valentini and Carlivati contacted Mills' agent and offered her the role. Though she was flattered to have been handpicked for the role, Mills was hesitant to take the job. She revealed that she had been approached by CBS Daytime drama The Young and the Restless years earlier but turned down the role because she felt the timing was off. Mills wanted to speak with them directly about the character. "And if Donna Mills says, 'Let's get on the phone,' you get on the phone" Valentini said." Thanks to the phone conversation, Mills agreed to the role. She said "they really did a sell job on me!" Mills explained, "They got on the phone and they did their magic. It sounded like it would be fun." Valentini stressed that only Mills could play the part so she agreed despite not knowing much about the character. Mills spoke with her former Knots Landing co-stars Ted Shackelford and Joan Van Ark about their experiences in daytime. Mills also admitted "I could do GH now because my daughter is in college." The actress later said "I'm missing my daughter terribly, so it really helps to have GH to keep my mind busy." The job brought Mills back to her roots. Mills started out acting in the 1960s in the daytime soaps, The Secret Storm and Love Is a Many Splendored Thing. Mills was also reunited with her former Splendored Thing co-star Leslie Charleson who joined the soap in 1977 as Monica Quartermaine. Ironically, legendary GH producer Gloria Monty had cast Mills in the role of "Rocket" on The Secret Storm.

In an interview featured in Nelson Branco's Soap Opera Uncensored, Mills explained that she was initially contracted to do 12 episodes but she was definitely open to the possibility of doing more. However, head writer Ron Carlivati said "she can stay as long as she wants." "It's not a way that I'm used to working" Mills said of her experience on set. "There's no time for anything. You just do it and it's done" she said of the rapid production style. Mills compared the experience to her prime time work and said "GH is like a runaway train! They do nine episodes a week! On Knots we shot, oh, maybe 10 pages a day at most -- and that was a really heavy day for us. On GH, they're shooting 150 a day, every day. To tell you the truth, I'm kind of in shock." During a television interview with ABC 7 News, Mills expressed her disdain for the rapid pace. "I hate the pace! Are you kidding me? Who would like this? No, it's terrible! You have no chance to rehearse and feel it." Mills revealed to Soaps In Depth that the quick pacing made it difficult for her but the show had agreed to accommodate her by allowing her to work a certain number of days and film a certain number of scenes whenever she returned. It made it easier for her to say yes to the returns. After she finished her second arc, Mills said the work had become more manageable because she had gotten rid of her nerves and "I am a little more familiar with it... I know how to pace myself a little better." In May 2015 Mills said of her multiple returns, "When you play a fun character like this, you get hooked."

=== Characterization ===
Power, privilege, ruthless, scheming, secrets... fair warning Port Charles! Nobody does it like Donna Mills!

— From ABC's promo of Mills's debut.

Ron Carlivati crafted the role of Madeline specifically with Mills in mind. "Knots is my favorite TV show ever and growing up, I was obsessed with Donna. Still am!" Carlivati revealed to TV Guide. The writer explained that when he first envisioned Madeline, "it suddenly came to me: 'Oh, my God, she's Abby Ewing!" Carlivati described the character of Madeline as "a glamorous, high-powered bitch on wheels." Mills said "She's very complicated. Very screwed up." Mills said that there was a reason that her husband left her without money. According to Mills's interview with Soap Opera Digest, Madeline is "very Upper East Side of New York City." Mills described Madeline as being very "social, sophisticated, powerful and smart." Rosemary Rossi described Madeline as "selfish, spoiled, rude and belittling" and categorized her as an "acid-tongued" "she-devil." According to Mills, Madeline usually keeps her emotions to herself but she has a soft spot for certain people. Michael Logan described Madeline as "yet another ritzy firestarter" when compared to Abby. Upon her return in October 2014, Mills explained that "She's going to have more than one side." The actress continued, "I think she's got a really bad side." Madeline is "kind of blind" to her misdeeds. It's not really a huge deal to her. When comparing her two characters, Mills noted that the biggest difference is that Abby was a good mother and "with Madeline, not so much."

=== Introduction (2014) ===
On March 10, 2014, ABC Daytime released a short promotional package for the character. On March 14, 2014, Mills made her debut as the mother of estranged mother-in-law of Dr. Silas Clay (Michael Easton), on a "mission to get Silas to give up that inheritance." Madeline has always believed Silas married her now comatose daughter Nina for money. As far as Madeline is concerned, "he wanted a scholarship fund." But now that he's found success as a doctor, Madeline figures he doesn't need the money. Madeline is also revealed to be the mother of Nathan West (Ryan Paevey). According to Mills, Madeline is "kind of paranoid" because her husband died leaving her (and Nathan) with nothing—everything belonged to the comatose Nina. Though she is proud of her son for trying to avenge Nina and pin prove Silas poisoned Nina, she looks down on him becoming a cop to do so. "Madeline considers police work a very lowly, undignified profession" Mills explained. "It's so beneath her stature!" Madeline only shows her vulnerability with Nathan. "There's a real soft spot in her heart for him" Mills explained. During a podcast interview with On-Air On-Soaps shortly after her debut, Mills hinted at several other major twists in the story.

As previously rumored, it is revealed that Madeline was responsible for her daughter's coma. She administered the drugs to kill Nina's unborn child to keep said child (and Silas) from inheriting the family's money. Madeline then kills the pharmacist to cover her tracks only to be caught and arrested by Nathan himself. On the April 9 episode, Madeline is revealed to be the long lost sister of the treacherous Dr. Liesl Obrecht (Kathleen Gati). Born Magda Westbourne in Zürich, Switzerland, she leaves home with bigger and better dreams. She ditches her accent, changes her name to Madeline West and marries a wealthy man. It is also revealed that Nathan is actually Liesl's biological son. According to Mills, "Madeline never liked Liesl much" and doesn't think she would have been a good mother to Nathan. As she is extradited back to New York to stand trial, Madeline "drops a bombshell on [Nathan] that's life altering." As Madeline is written out on May 1, she informs Nathan that Nina is alive. Michelle Stafford then made a surprise appearance as a very much alive Nina.

=== Returns (2014–15, 2018) ===
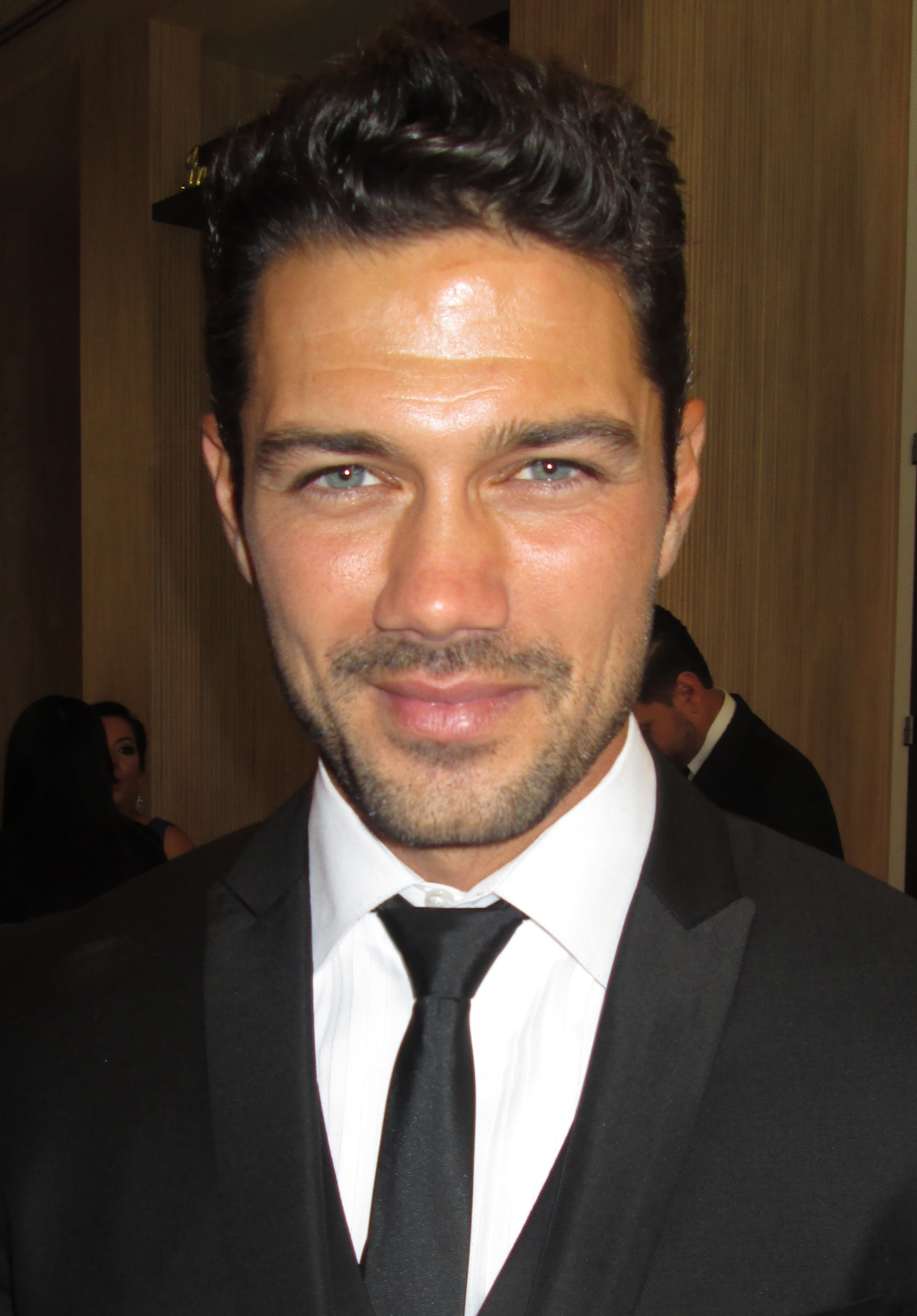
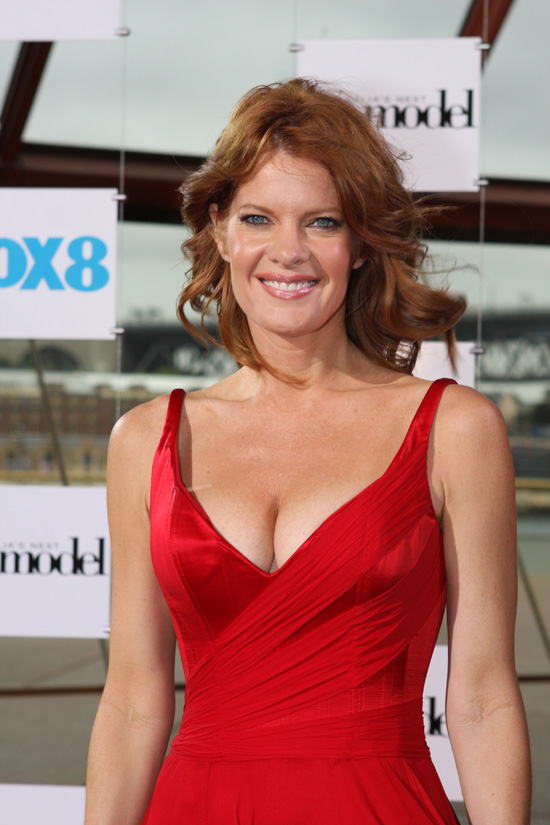
Ryan Paevey (left) and Michelle Stafford (right) portrayed Madeline's children Nathan and Nina. Her schemes not only cost Madeline her freedom, but also destroy her relationship with her son and daughter.

During Madeline's first stint with the series, Ron Carlivati revealed that the writers had already planned out the character's return arc and were just waiting for Mills to jump on board. About a month after wrapping her first stint, Mills confirmed to Soaps In Depth that her return was definitely going to happen. In July 2014, it was officially announced that Mills would return. In August 2014, Frank Valentini said "We're still working on the dates and the deals" but Madeline would definitely factor into Nina's storyline. Mills made her onscreen return in October 2014 as Madeline tries to get into her daughter Nina's good graces. Mills appreciated that the character had some more layers. Though her scheming does more harm to her children then good there is "a love for" them Mills insisted. Madeline is "afraid" of an unhinged Nina and is aware that she is unstable. Also, Madeline's concerns about "being broke" are what drives her to do certain unspeakable things. In exchange for access to the family's money, Madeline agrees to help Nina kidnap the newborn baby of Ava Jerome (Maura West) -- Silas's former mistress. However, she gets arrested only after Nina attacks her and leaves her for dead. Mills later revealed that she'd be sharing scenes with Maura West when both Madeline and Ava landed in prison in January 2015. During the confrontation, Madeline expresses her delight at seeing Ava finally paying for destroying Nina's life so many years ago. When Ava points out that her scheming has landed her in prison as well, Madeline shrugs it off assuming a judge will believe that she was truly scared for her life when she agreed to help Nina. Mills is last seen on January 29, 2015, as Madeline tries to avoid getting shot when Ava and several other prisoners escape from prison.

In an interview with Soaps In Depth, Mills confirmed that she would reprise the role of Madeline again and would start filming on April 27, the day after the 42nd Daytime Emmy Awards. She expected to start airing sometime in late May. In an interview featured in a June 2015 issue of Soap Opera Digest, Mills looked forward to working opposite Rick Hearst who played Madeline's new son-in-law Ric Lansing. However, the actress admitted that she did not how long the return would last. On August 31, 2015, Madeline is revealed to be the killer of Silas Clay. Mills revealed that the producers had filmed several scenarios for Silas's murder to maintain the mystery. At the time, Mills herself was not aware that Michael Easton was leaving the show. The hiring of head writing team Jean Passanante and Shelly Altman left Mills uncertain of a future return to the series. The September 28 edition of Soaps In Depth confirmed that Mills had wrapped up her latest stint with the series despite Madeline's promise of a return.

In August 2018, Entertainment Weekly reported that Mills will be reprising her role as Madeline. Mills made her return on August 17, 2018.

== Reception ==
First KNOTS LANDING icon Donna Mills ware lured aboard as Madeline, who's both similar to Abby Ewing and a total departure from her (unless we missed the episode where Abby murdered a pharmacist).

— Soap Opera Digest on Mills' casting and the character.

The casting announcement was immediately praised from critics. "Praise, Soap Jesus!" Jamey Giddens said of the casting announcement. "I can't breathe. General Hospital has cast the mother of all prime time soap superbitches," Giddens continued. "If GH hadn't already been Must See Suds, it definitely is now!" Giddens exclaimed. Michael Fairman described the announcement as an "awesome casting bombshell." Soap Opera Network's Kambra Clifford said ever since the announcement, "tongues have been wagging regarding character details and a first airdate." On-Air On-Soaps praised the promo of Mills's debut and said "Now this is a promo apropos for the occasion!" "There Goes The Cul-De-Sac" said Daytime Confidential of the promo's release. Jamey Giddens said, "Power players in Port Charles, New York are about to be judged on the Abby [Cunningham] scale!" Giddens, who was a big fan of the actress gushed over Mills debut and said, "I have waited my entire life for this." ABC Soaps In Depth listed Madeline at #2 in the "5 Things We're Loving" section and said "Knot Landing vet Donna Mills has still got it!" On-Air On-Soaps praised Mills' portrayal of Madeline. "She can play steely conniving witch like no other!" Mills' casting along with several other high-profile castings led to Soap Opera Digest giving the soap the award for "Best Casting Coups" in 2014. Soap Opera Digest listed Mills as "performer of the week" for her portrayal of Madeline during the prison scenes. The magazine said sight of Mills in an orange jumpsuit was "positively priceless" and said Madeline's prison stint was as "glamorous" as Susan Lucci prison storyline as Erica Kane on All My Children. "Mills knew just how much scenery to chew to deliver a performance that was just as funny as it was menacing" the magazine raved. Greg Hernandez said "It's been a real treat to have Miss Mills back on television in a juicy soap role." Mills received her very first Emmy nomination in the Outstanding Special Guest Performer in a Drama Series category for her portrayal of Madeline. Mills revealed that the nomination was a happy surprise because she was not aware that the show had submitted her. Mills won the Daytime Emmy Award for Outstanding Special Guest Performer in a Drama Series at the 42nd Daytime Emmy Awards in 2015. She tied with Ray Wise of The Young and the Restless and Fred Willard from The Bold and the Beautiful.
