= Nathan West (General Hospital) =

Fictional character from General Hospital

- General Hospital character
- Portrayed by: Ryan Paevey
- Duration: 2013–2018
- First appearance: December 30, 2013
- Last appearance: February 9, 2018
- Created by: Ron Carlivati
- Introduced by: Frank Valentini
In-universe information
- Other names: James Nathan Reeves; James Nathan West
- Occupation: Detective
- Parents: Cesar Faison; Liesl Obrecht
- Adoptive parents: Madeline Reeves
- Siblings: Nina Reeves (adoptive); Peter August (half); Britt Westbourne; Cassius Faison
- Spouse: Claudette Beaulieu (2006–2016); Maxie Jones (2017–2018)
- Children: James West
- Aunts and uncles: Madeline Reeves
- Nieces and nephews: Nelle Benson (adoptive); Willow Tait (adoptive); Bailey Jones
- First cousins: Nina Reeves

Nathan West is a fictional character from General Hospital, an American soap opera on the ABC network, portrayed by Ryan Paevey. Created by head writer Ron Carlivati, Nathan was introduced in late 2013 by Frank Valentini as a love interest for Maxie Jones (Kirsten Storms). In January 2018, Paevey announced he had opted to leave the serial of his own decision.

Paevey's casting was very well received. The character of Nathan becomes quite popular rather quickly among viewers and critics, becoming known as the show's resident heroic "good guy" as he tries to support his mess of a family. At the same time, Nathan's pairing with Maxie becomes a fan favorite pairing and their "slow burn" romance was praised by critics.

== Development ==
=== Casting and creation ===
In November 2013, the producers released a casting call for a contract role. In late December 2013, head writer Ron Carlivati announced on Twitter that model turned actor Ryan Paevey had joined the cast in the contract role of Detective Nathan West. The December 30th edition of Soap Opera Digest revealed that Paevey's first scenes were with Kirsten Storms, who played Maxie Jones. ABC Soaps In Depth confirmed the character's full name to be Nathan West. Paevey made his debut as a contract cast member. Though he was originally slated to appear on December 27, Paevey's first air date was pushed back to December 30, due to news coverage.

During an interview with AfterBuzz TV, Paevey revealed that the rather unconventional casting process started when he was just lounging around with his close friends and management team and one of his managers suggested that Paevey should meet with casting director Mark Teschner. Paevey revealed that when he first auditioned for the show, "there was no part. They just wanted some young blood on the show." The producers had the actor come in to read dummy sides quite a few times. He was brought back to audition again for executive producer Frank Valentini and other people from the network. During the audition process, he screen-tested opposite Storms and Chad Duell, who played Michael Corinthos. Of his casting, Paevey said, "This is my first series regular role, the first time I have a dressing room with my name on the door. I'm not an ego guy, but by the same token, I also kind of wanted to my best to fit in quickly." Paevey himself was shocked by his success because he had no prior acting experience when he auditioned for General Hospital.

In August 2025, it was announced Paevey was returning to General Hospital in an undisclosed role. The following month, it was announced he would reprise the role of Nathan beginning with the September 19 episode. In March 2026, it was revealed that Paevey was in fact portraying Nathan's twin, Cassius Faison posing as Nathan.

=== Characterization ===
Paevey on similarities to his character

I'm a straight shooter. I tell it like it is. I can be kind of blunt. I'm serious and stoic. I have great respect for justice. Truth and honesty are big things to me. I can tell when I'm being lied to. Always. Nathan is the same way. We both place importance on honesty, justice and fairness.

— ABC Soaps In Depth (2014)

The initial casting notice described the character as a "Caucasian" in his "late 20s" who is "handsome, sexy" and "dynamic." The character was further described as a "rich, privileged, charming badboy." However, the "badboy" characteristic appeared to have been dropped by the time of Paevey's casting. In an interview with Soap Opera Digest, Paevey described Nathan as a "good guy," who is "guided by a moral compass. He's a straight-shooter." Paevey described Nathan's demeanor as a cop as "hawklike focus." Ron Carlivati described Nathan as a "hard-nosed, buttoned-down, practical guy." Soap Opera Digest described Nathan as a "hard-driving cop character." Paevey told Soaps In Depth that Nathan's birth name, "James represents a part his family [and himself] that is restricted." This complicates things further because he loves his family very much and there are several aspects of that family that make Nathan who he is. Paevey said that during the audition process when the character was being formed, he noticed that he and the character had a lot in common. Since the character's introduction, it has been very clear that "he's a law-abiding, true-seeking good guy." Paevey immediately rejected the notion that Nathan could have a dark side because of his genetics – "I don't think he's the type" Paevey insisted. "Sometimes a good egg comes out of a bad nest." According to Paevey, Nathan is not "morally ambiguous." He doesn't have some deep dark sketchy past that he is trying to live down. Nathan is "straight and he's clear. My gut tells me that," Paevey said. Paevey later said "I think the fact that his family was so busted up is the reason he's a good guy."

=== Introduction (2014) ===
Not attaching Nathan to a specific love interest immediately allows for the writers to slowly integrate him into the canvas. Soaps In Depth reported that Nathan's isn't just some "run-of-the-mill" cop, but "he's on a mission to stir things up for a few people!" It is soon revealed that Nathan is in town investigating his estranged brother-in-law Silas Clay (Michael Easton) in the attempted murder of his comatose sister Nina. However, Silas's former mistress Ava Jerome (Maura West) is also at the top of the suspect list. In 2014, legendary actress Donna Mills, known for her portrayal of Abby Cunningham on the prime time soap, Knots Landing was cast in the role of Madeline Reeves—Nathan's mother. It is revealed that Madeline raised Nathan to believe Silas was guilty and he is working on her behalf to lock Silas up for Nina's condition. Despite acting to avenge his sister, Nathan tolerates Madeline's disdain for his career choice because she thinks it is "below them." Nathan partners up with Silas and his girlfriend Sam Morgan (Kelly Monaco) to set a trap for Ava believing she is guilty. However, the sting operation doesn't go as planned when Madeline is revealed to be the culprit—and Nathan is forced to arrest her.

=== Lineage ===
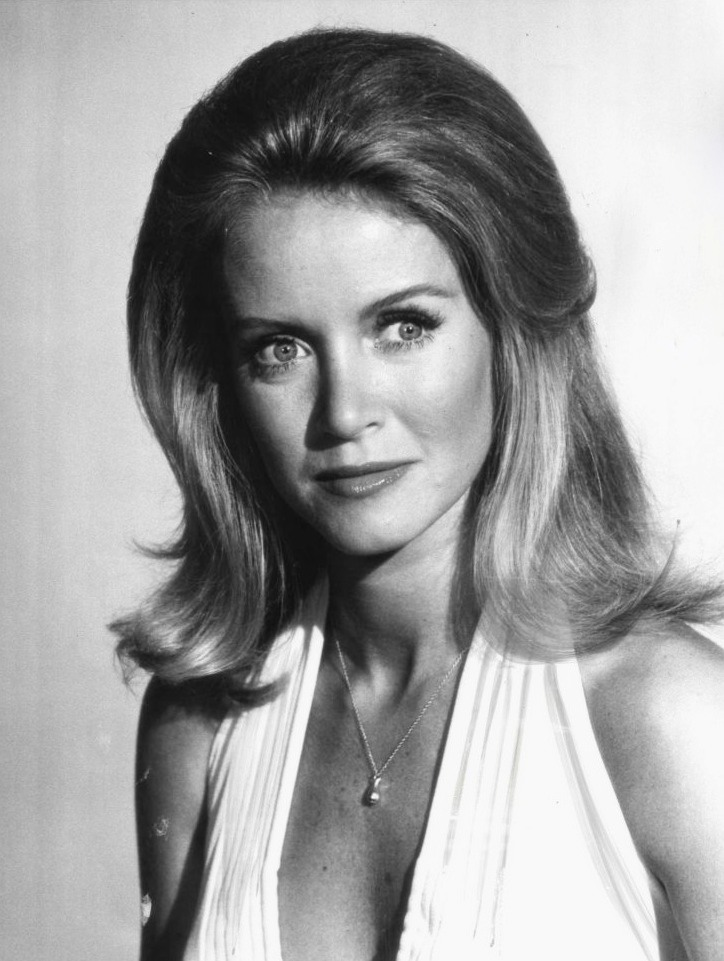
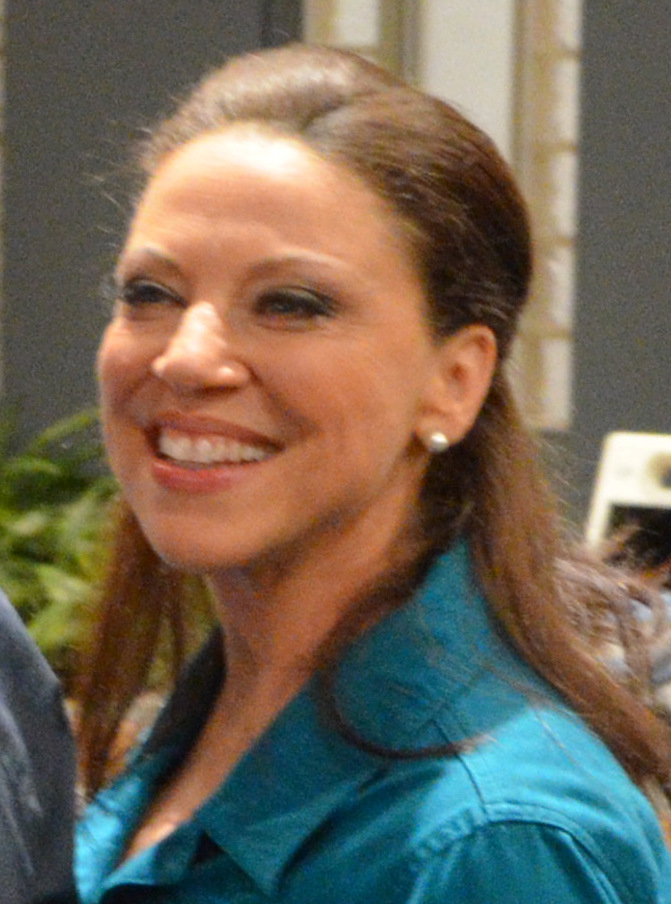
Veteran actresses Donna Mills (left) and Kathleen Gati (right) portray Nathan's aunt Madeline Reeves who raised him as her own and Nathan's biological mother Liesl Obrecht, respectively.

Madeline's arrest sets the stage for several more revelations starting with Nathan being revealed to be the biological son of Madeline's estranged sister, Liesl Obrecht (Kathleen Gati) and therefore the half-brother of Obrecht's daughter Britt Westbourne (Kelly Thiebaud). Nathan is "dumbfounded" by the shift in his family dynamics, much like Paevey himself. Madeline is forced to come clean after learning that Nathan and Britt nearly slept together. Soaps In Depth said Nathan is in a "rock and hard place" with mothers like Obrecht and Madeline. Nathan must come to terms with the fact that "the murderer he thought to be his mother is actually his aunt. And the murderer he believed to be just another nutjob is actually his biological mother!" According to Paevey, Nathan is immediately put off by the revelation of his connection to Obrecht due to her less than stellar reputation and he is reluctant to have anything to do with her. While she is genuinely interested in building a relationship, he is not. Though Paevey expected Nathan to eventually bond with Obrecht, Ron Carlivati insisted it would take much more than the information for Nathan to come to see Liesl as his mother especially because of his feelings towards Madeline. Nathan struggles with trusting anyone because his entire life has been a lie. And because there is so much happening in his life at the time Nathan's feelings about the situation get pushed to the side. As Madeline is carted off to prison, she drops yet another bomb on Nathan by revealing that Nina (Michelle Stafford) is very much alive. For Nathan, his relationship with Nina has always been "sacrosanct" and he is that one good thing in her life which makes him vulnerable to her schemes. According to Paevey, "Nina is the one pure memory of [Nathan's] childhood." When Madeline is released from prison, Nathan tries to give her the benefit of the doubt because her actions don't negate the good she did in raising him. As for his feelings toward Obrecht, Nathan recognizes she isn't "all-bad." Despite giving them a chance, Paevey said "nothing really surprises him anymore" when it comes to his family. Nathan's expectations are not too high because "he already knows that everybody in his family is a mess." In 2014, Paevey said "Nathan is intrinsically distrustful of the concept of his family."

Despite the recent revelations about Nathan's other familial connections, in May 2014 Paevey himself wondered if Nathan's paternity would be addressed. With the reveal that Obrecht is his mother, On-Air On-Soaps immediately speculated that Cesar Faison (Anders Hove) who had recently been revealed as his sister Britt's father could be Nathan's father too. However, Carol Baroom from SoapHub said the Faison theory "doesn't make sense" because there would have been no reason for Obrecht to give Nathan up—she would have raised him with Faison and Britt. Faison as Nathan's father would also contradict Obrecht's prior disappointment with being unable to give him a male heir. Baroom also suggested that Obrecht feels it would hurt Faison to know she had another man's child. In December 2014, it is made clear that Faison would have never accepted another man's child.

Obrecht: You and I are the only ones who know he's not your son. What's that saying? "Two people can keep a secret... if one of them is dead." I needed to keep this a secret.

Victor: Yes, well, that I understand. What I don't understand... is why.

Obrecht: Nathan must believe you are his father... because the truth is far, far worse.

— Obrecht and Victor discuss Nathan's paternity. (2014)

In June 2014, when Thaao Penghlis announced that he would reprise his role as Victor Cassadine, Daytime Confidential speculated that Victor could turn out to be Nathan's father. During an interview in July 2014, Ryan Paevey guessed that his character would turn out to be a member of the famous, yet infamous Cassadine family. Meanwhile, speculation increased when Penghlis invited Paevey to appear with him at his book signing and fed into the rumors with cryptic messages on social media. However, Penghlis refused to confirm or deny the potential plot twist when he was questioned by Soaps In Depth. Then head writer Ron Carlivati revealed that there was much more to Victor and Obrecht's relationship than expected. Though she viewed Victor as the more "feasible" candidate for Nathan's father, Carol Baroom immediately questioned Obrecht's motives for hiding Nathan from Victor and vice versa. Obrecht claims Victor as Nathan's father in September 2014 only for Victor to order a DNA test which disproves that theory. However, Obrecht kills Victor before he can tell Nathan that they aren't father and son after all. She then allows Nathan and the rest of the world to believe her lie.

In March 2015, Janette Smith of Soap Opera Spy recognized that Obrecht "fears for the safety of Nathan if his father is ever revealed" and proposed yet another potential candidate as Nathan's father. Based on Obrecht going to such extreme lengths to keep Nathan from questioning his paternity, Smith speculated that Nathan's father could actually be the never before seen Valentin Cassadine—a character that was slated to be introduced in 2009, but the story was terminated before it hit airwaves. Even the notoriously evil Helena Cassadine (Constance Towers) who had wreaked havoc on Port Charles for years was visibly terrified of Valentin when the character was first mentioned in 2009 as he was supposed to be more much more lethal than any of the other Cassadines. In May 2016, Paevey commented on the character's paternity plot taking a backseat as his story progressed and felt it would definitely be addressed sometime in the future. However, Paevey admitted that the writers were very adamant about a Cassadine connection. When Valentin (James Patrick Stuart) comes after Nathan's supposed daughter Charlotte in October 2016, SoapHub's Hope Campbell speculated that the series had finally set the stage to solve the two-year long mystery of Nathan's paternity.

=== Relationships ===
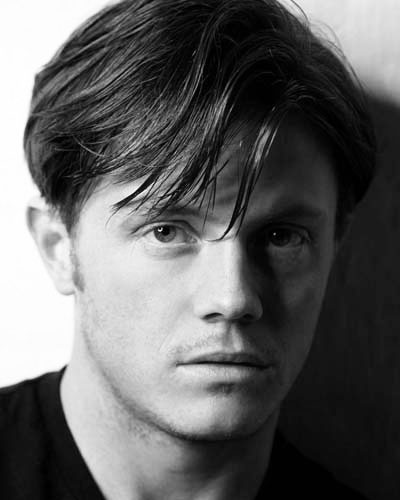
Zachary Garred played Levi, who does his best to isolate Maxie from her loved ones, putting him at odds with Nathan.

Nathan's only significant romance within the series to date is his relationship with Maxie Jones (Kirsten Storms). Ron Carlivati recalled during an interview with Soap Opera Digest, "When we saw Ryan [Paevey, Nathan] we thought, 'Oh, wow, he'd be really great for Maxie.'" The purpose of their first scenes, which are Storms's final scenes before her maternity leave to make sure viewers saw the obvious chemistry. Carlivati said "These two may be arguing, bickering, or sparring, but you can see there is a spark there." According to Ryan Paevey, Nathan and Maxie clash because they complete opposites and that is what appeals to Nathan. He finds her to be "charming." Meanwhile, Nathan clashes with Maxie's new boyfriend Levi Dunkleman (Zachary Garred) and a triangle evolves from the storyline with Levi exploiting the existing tension between Nathan and Maxie. Unlike Levi, Nathan is supportive of any decision Maxie makes on her own—but they struggle to recognize how right they are each other. But it Nathan's willingness to break the law for Maxie by committing perjury that allows for fans to root for the couple. With Maxie and Levi set to marry to prevent him from being deported, Nathan admits to himself that he has feelings for Maxie. The triangle culminates with Levi proving to be even more dangerous than even Nathan could have thought. Levi and Maxie's wedding sets the stage for Levi's exposure and also allows for Nathan to play hero to Maxie. Carlivati said that he enjoyed the slow build between Maxie and Nathan. Nathan would do anything to give Maxie some stability in her life, even overlooking when she breaks the law for a friend. Throughout the triangle, Nathan finds an ally in Maxie's stepfather Mac Scorpio (John J. York).

The couple's next obstacle comes in the form of Maxie's ex-boyfriend and father of her child, Damian Spinelli (Bradford Anderson). They briefly split and Maxie goes back to Spinelli. Nathan steps back and allows for Maxie to realize what she really wants. According to Paevey, Nathan understands Maxie's need to make it work with Spinelli for the child's sake and knows there will "always" be love between them. Nathan is briefly paired with Spinelli's girlfriend Ellie Trout (Emily Wilson) when they team up to make their respective loves jealous.

In 2016, the writers began exploring Nathan's past by revealing that he was once married to a woman named Claudette—something he had chosen to keep from Maxie—and everyone else. In the meantime, Maxie and Nathan become engaged. In May 2016, it was announced that Bree Williamson had been cast in the role of Claudette and was set to debut in July 2016. Though there seems to be more to the story than Nathan is willing to admit, according to Ryan Paevey, it is Nathan's honest nature that forces him to come clean. Nathan "recognizes how glaringly out of character" the consistent lying is. Though he has some encouragement from Griffin Munro (Matt Cohen), Paevey insisted that Nathan would've eventually came clean on his own—but confiding in the doctor-priest helped hasten his decision. Despite the lie, Nathan fears that "knowing all these things is going to make [Maxie] view him as someone that she doesn't want to be with." Nathan doesn't have any cards left to play once he comes clean. He confesses and hopes "their feelings are strong enough to carry them through this."

== Storylines ==
Detective Nathan West arrives in Port Charles, and meets Maxie Jones (Kirsten Storms) when he sublets her apartment. Maxie leaves on a vacation, while Nathan settles in Port Charles. He starts investigating Dr. Silas Clay (Michael Easton) in regards to the overdose of Silas' wife, Nina Reeves (Michelle Stafford), suspecting Silas is responsible. It's later revealed Nathan is actually Nina's brother. Nathan's mother Madeline Reeves (Donna Mills) claims Nina has died after Silas has relinquished his rights to Nina's vast estate. Nathan is shocked when Madeline falls into the trap to catch the killer, and confesses she drugged Nina to kill her unborn child. He arrests Madeline, and simultaneously reveals his identity. Maxie returns with her new manipulative boyfriend Levi Dunkleman (Zachary Garred), who Nathan immediately clashes with.

Nathan meets Britt Westbourne (Kelly Thiebaud) at the same time it's revealed Nathan is the biological son of Liesl Obrecht (Kathleen Gati), Madeline's sister, and Britt is actually his sister. Madeline confesses to Nathan when he mentions almost sleeping with Britt. Nathan is shocked when Madeline reveals Nina is alive as she is carted off to prison. Maxie is trying to regain custody of her daughter Georgie, but is discouraged about going to her hearing. Nathan encourages Maxie to fight for Georgie, then covers for her, lying he threw her summons away by mistake. When the judge discovers Nathan lied for Maxie and she loses custody of her daughter, Nathan suspects Levi tipped off the judge, and tries to prove it. Meanwhile, Nathan is reunited with Nina, who arrives in Port Charles. Levi later frames Nathan for tipping off immigration about Levi's expired visa, leading to Maxie throwing Nathan out of the apartment. As Maxie is set to marry Levi, Nathan discovers Levi has stolen a family heirloom from Maxie's mother Felicia Scorpio (Kristina Wagner). With the help of his partner Dante Falconeri (Dominic Zamprogna), Nathan crashes the wedding, only for Levi to escape with Maxie and Dante's wife, Lulu (Emme Rylan), at gunpoint. Nathan tracks down Maxie, but is kidnapped by Victor Cassadine (Thaao Penghlis). Nathan is about to kill Victor until Obrecht says they are father and son. Nathan rescues Maxie, and the two end up killing Levi and his father, Peter Harrell (David Gautreaux). As they escape, it was revealed Victor isn't Nathan's father. Obrecht kills Victor to keep Nathan from finding out.

Nathan and Maxie start dating, but when Maxie is threatened with losing custody of Georgie again, they're forced to stay apart. Nathan asks for help from his mother, who arranges for Monica Quartermaine (Leslie Charleson) to appeal to the judge on Maxie's behalf. A thrilled Maxie gets visitation rights to Georgie, and she and Nathan finally start a relationship freely. Nathan moves out at Maxie's request they ease into their relationship. They later clash when Maxie helps fugitive Johnny Zacchara (Brandon Barash) skip town. Georgie returns with her father Damian Spinelli (Bradford Anderson), who is hoping to reunite with Maxie. Maxie dumps Nathan after she blames him for accepting Spinelli's challenge to box for her affections. Nathan teams up with Spinelli's ex-girlfriend Ellie Trout (Emily Wilson), pretending to date to make their respective lovers jealous. The plan works, and Maxie and Nathan reunite after the Nurses' Ball. Silas is found dead, and Nina is accused of murdering him. Wanting to prove Nina innocent, Nathan investigates, and starts to suspect Ric Lansing (Rick Hearst), Nina's new husband whom she randomly married. Nathan figures out Ric married Nina on Madeline's request, to drive Nina crazy and gain Nina's inheritance. Nathan gets Ric's cooperation, and is able to arrest Madeline for Silas' murder, disgusted by her actions.

When Nathan is shot in 2016, under the influence of drugs, he refers to Maxie as "Claudette." Maxie later asked Nathan who Claudette is, and he claims it was his dog. Nathan later admits she's his ex-wife, Claudette Beaulieu. Nathan admits he and Claudette had a green card marriage, but he fell in love with her till he discovered she was cheating on him. Nathan later confesses to Obrecht he didn't tell Maxie the entire story. After he and Maxie get engaged, Nathan admits he discovered Claudette's infidelity when he walked in on her and her lover. Drunk and angry, he shot Claudette's lover, who disappeared. Maxie is hesitant to trust Nathan, but they soon reconcile, only for Claudette (Bree Williamson) to show up in town. Maxie convinces Nathan to let Claudette stay to keep an eye on her. Nathan discovers his recent confidant Griffin Munro (Matt Cohen) was Claudette's lover. Furious, he attacks Griffin. Maxie and Claudette have to pull him off. Maxie accuses him of still being in love with Claudette, but he convinces her this is not true, and he loves her. Claudette asks Nathan for help to protect her daughter, Charlotte (Scarlett Fernandez) – who she claims is also Nathan's daughter – from Claudette's ex-lover, Valentin Cassadine (James Patrick Stuart). Rightfully suspicious, Maxie exposes Charlotte is not Nathan's daughter. Claudette eventually skips town, and Nathan and Maxie get back to planning their wedding. They're set to marry on New Year's Eve, but Nathan finds out his marriage to Claudette was never annulled, hence they're still married and he can't marry Maxie. He and Maxie fly to Canada to track down Claudette, and find out she's dead. Nathan and Maxie return, and finally get married in early 2017.

When Maxie goes to Portland for work, Nathan is left to wonder if the marriage can survive the long distance. Nathan learns Nurse Amy Driscoll (Risa Dorken) has been writing the "Ask Man Landers" advice blog, using his picture. Nathan is initially upset until Amy reveals she is writing the column to support her brother Chet (Chris Van Etten), a war veteran who was wounded in action. When Amy lands a book deal, he agrees to help her out so she can pay Chet's medical bills. Maxie returns, and aims to expose Ask Man Landers' identity forcing Nathan to lie. Amy gives Nathan her blessing to tell Maxie the truth just as Maxie begins to suspect they are having an affair. Nathan and Amy's secret is exposed in tabloids forcing them to do damage control. Chet steps in and tells his story, winning sympathy and keeping Nathan and Amy from being charged with fraud. On Thanksgiving, Nathan is thrilled when Maxie reveals she's pregnant.

In preparation for the baby's arrival, Nathan requests Victor's medical records. While Obrecht obtains the records, Nathan and Maxie realize the medical records are inconsistent with the Cassadine family's genetic history and a DNA test later confirms Nathan is not a Cassadine after all. Obrecht is forced to admit that Cesar Faison (Anders Hove) is Nathan's biological father. Lulu convinces Nathan to do an exposé on him as Faison's son to help the authorities lure him out of hiding. Maxie fears the danger Faison could bring to their doorstep, but Nathan is determined to bring his father to justice. As expected, Faison shows up and takes Maxie and her boss Peter August (Wes Ramsey) hostage. Nathan comes to Maxie's rescue only to be shot by Faison. While he survives emergency surgery, Nathan dies in recovery shortly after professing his love for Maxie. He was buried with full policeman honors. Maxie later gives birth to a baby boy; in memory of Nathan, she names their son James, Nathan's given name.

In September 2025, Nathan's twin brother, Cassius Faison, assumes Nathan's identity after a car crash, leading people to mistakenly believe he is Nathan due to their resemblance.

== Reception ==
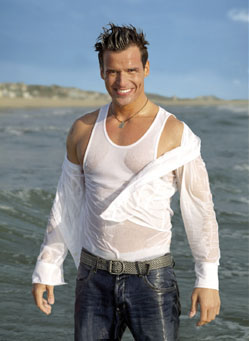
Ryan Paevey's "good looks" drew comparisons to former General Hospital heartthrob Antonio Sabàto Jr. who played top cop Jagger Cates in the 1990s.

Carlivati's Twitter announcement garnered quite the reaction with fans wondering about Paevey and his role on the show. Shortly after Paevey's debut, a fan created a fake Twitter account, pretending to be the actor. Of the fan reaction, ABC Soaps In Depth said Paevey was an "instant hit on social media and the internet," and described as the "next big thing." Connie Passalacqua of the soap opera website, Marlena De Lacroix listed Paevey as one of the daytime four actors to watch in 2014. She said: "Paevey is quite good looking, can act well and plays a police detective quite believably." Soaps In Depth listed the character at number 5 in the "5 Things We're Loving" section in the February 3, 2014 edition. Sara Bibel said that while "GH is full off good looking men." Paevey is one that makes others say "Damn, he's good looking." Bibel also likened the character of Nathan to a young Mac Scorpio. Of the character's introduction, the magazine said, "We can't help but love a man of mystery, and that's what General Hospital's Nathan –– whom we've dubbed Detective Sexypants –– is to us right now." One viewer praised the casting of Paevey and Ryan Carnes (Lucas Jones) and the fan mail was featured in Soap Opera Digest: "great job adding [Paevey and Carnes]; drop-dead gorgeous and they can act too!" The character of Nathan became quite popular with fans, despite viewer complaints that there were too many characters on canvas. Carol Boorom from SoapHub said Paevey "whose good looks are only out shined by his good heart, is a special treat to watch." DashboardGirl from General Hospital Blog said "Ryan Paevey has been such a delightful newcomer to the GH cast." She continued, "he's easy on the eyes, and his role as Detective West is nothing short of sweet, sexy, compassionate, and much more." On Britt and Nathan being siblings, Soaps In Depth said, "They may well be the hottest siblings ever." Paevey "has become quite the sensation in short amount of time" said Michael Fairman in November 2014. Paevey's popularity led to the 30-year-old being featured in People's "Sexiest Man Alive" issue in "The Sexiest Men At Every Age" list. In 2015, Jenn Bishop of TVSource Magazine included the character in the list of several new characters that she enjoyed from Ron Carlivati. In 2015, Rosemary A. Rossi described Paevey as "one of the hottest properties on daytime." Paevey's popularity also landed him a reporting gig on the syndicated TV newsmagazine Extra.

Within Paevey's first year on the series, his character entered into a relationship with Maxie Jones that became quite popular with viewers and critics alike. ABC Soaps In Depth described the chemistry between Paevey's Nathan and Storms' Maxie as "instant." General Hospital Blog praised the duo's chemistry described Nathan and Maxie (known as Naxie) as "one of the most loveable couples on GH." TVSource Magazine praised the duo's chemistry as well as the "slow burn" writing for the pairing: "Nathan and Maxie have reminded us what a soap couple worth for looks like."
