= Liesl Obrecht =

Fictional character on General Hospital

- General Hospital character
- Kathleen Gati as Liesl Obrecht
- Portrayed by: Kathleen Gati (2012–present); Finola Hughes (2013)
- Duration: 2012–2023, 2025–present
- First appearance: August 24, 2012
- Created by: Ron Carlivati
- Introduced by: Frank Valentini
In-universe information
- Other names: Liesl Westbourne; Anna Devane (2013); Adele Dazeem (2014)
- Occupation: Physician; General Hospital chief of staff (2014–2016)
- Sisters: Madeline Reeves
- Sons: Nathan West; Cassius Faison
- Daughters: Britt Westbourne
- Grandsons: James West
- Nephews: Nathan West (adoptive)
- Nieces: Nina Reeves
- Other relatives: Nelle Benson; Willow Tait; Wiley Corinthos-Quartermaine; Jonah Corinthos; Amelia Corinthos; James West (adoptive)

Liesl Obrecht is a fictional character on the long-running ABC daytime soap opera, General Hospital, played by Kathleen Gati. The character was created by head writer Ron Carlivati and introduced by executive producer Frank Valentini in the summer of 2012 in what was initially supposed to be a bit role. When she joined the storyline, Dr. Obrecht was the director of the Swiss clinic where the presumed dead Dr. Robin Scorpio (Kimberly McCullough) was being imprisoned by the infamous Cesar Faison (Anders Hove).

Impressed by Gati's portrayal of the character, the producers expanded the role and in early 2013 Obrecht was revealed to be the mother of the scheming Dr. Britt Westbourne (Kelly Thiebaud) fathered by the legendary Faison himself. Obrecht schemes to help Britt win the affections of Robin's husband, Dr. Patrick Drake (Jason Thompson) and later Nikolas Cassadine (Tyler Christopher) by impregnating Britt with Dante (Dominic Zamprogna) and Lulu Falconeri (Emme Rylan)'s embryo. Obrecht also develops a rivalry with Faison's longtime obsession and Robin's mother, Anna Devane (Finola Hughes). In 2014, in addition to becoming chief of staff at General Hospital, Obrecht is revealed to be the biological mother of Detective Nathan West (Ryan Paevey), raised by her estranged sister, Madeline Reeves (Donna Mills). Gati took a break from the role in 2020. She last appeared on April 13, 2020. She returned on September 28, 2020. Gati quietly left the show on December 12, 2023. Gati returned on July 17, 2025.

== Development ==
=== Casting and creation ===
Kathleen Gati made her first appearance as Liesl Obrecht on August 24, 2012. "They needed a German doctor to say a few things and then go" Gati remarked to Soaps In Depth of how her character came to be. However, the writers were so impressed that they kept bringing Gati back. Gati said her status with the series "was always precarious and still is," despite the role being expanded. The role was only meant to last a few days to "take Robin (Kimberly McCullough) from Room A to Room B and talk to Tony Geary [Luke] in the hall to help him avoid seeing Robin and Anna Devane (Finola Hughes)." It was actually Tony Geary who sang Gati's praises to the executive producer, Frank Valentini after their scenes. Immediately impressed, Valentini sent head writer Ron Carlivati a piece of her scenes knowing Carlivati would be inspired to write more for her. Valentini chose Gati out of five other actresses that were up for the role. Valentini immediately informed Carlivati of how good she was. Though she was finding success in other recurring gigs, Gati insisted that "if GH asks me to sign a contract, I'll say yes. I feel like I'm at home here. I've been in Los Angeles for 15 years, and for the first time, I actually feel like I belong to a family." In October 2013, the role was briefly played by Finola Hughes when Dr. Obrecht tries to pass herself off as Anna Devane.

=== Characterization ===
"I think it's great that I am allowed to show everything, the rawness and the vulnerability and the evilness and the cuckoo-ness and the comedy. It's a feast for an actor, for sure."

— Kathleen Gati on the freedom of her portrayal. (2014)

Kathleen Gati said Obrecht is a "very focused woman, very educated, very serious." Obrecht is a "force to be reckoned with," the actress said. Dr. Obrecht is usually very "self-sufficient." Mara Levinsky described the character as a "sharp-tongued scene-stealer." Gati saw the potential for her character very early on and described Obrecht as "delicious and nasty." As the role continued to expand, "the writers gave me so many colors I could bring to the role. She was evil, she was kind, she was painful." Gati rejected the notion that Obrecht could be "rational" and said "She basically is evil" However, the actress insisted that Obrecht is a "person" who has "emotions" and shows "sensitivity" and a "soft side." She is not just "the campy, the broad, the evil, and the dark." Gati insisted Obrecht's "most redeeming" quality is the humor. Gati explained: "If Obrecht didn't get bonked on the head here and there when she made a big mistake, or if they didn't throw in an 'oops' every now and then, viewers wouldn't enjoy the character as much." That humor serves as a "relief" for viewers. When compared to herself, Gati said Obrecht is "dark and terrorizing" and characterized her as a "powerhouse." While the character has traits that humanize her, she was never given an actual redemption story. Soaps In Depth described Obrecht as "strong, smart, powerful, and has a humorous way with words." Maria Ciaccia of About.com described the character as "cold and domineering."

Of the way her character speaks, Gait said "She speaks with a certain style, intelligent and harsh." Obrecht is a "German character, but Swiss German, bright and sharp." When it comes to her character's dialogue, Gati explained that she tried to be as "verbatim as possible" because the character is written "stylized, broad and it's very detailed." As for the character's accent, the script is written in English and Gati inserts later. Kathleen Gati said she tries to get her scripts early so she can work in the character's accent. Gati described the accent as not being "quite Swiss. It's not quite German. It's something in between. In between where and where is virtually indecipherable. The accent is among the worst ever attempted, by anyone, anywhere. I have developed some kind of accent, sort of a neutral something, because she's very educated so she's obviously spent time in England and Britain." Gati then reviews her work and picks out things she thinks went over well and words or phrases she thinks need to be improved on.

=== Family and children ===
In March 2013, Obrecht was revealed to be the mother of the scheming doctor Britt Westbourne (Kelly Thiebaud). Ron Carlivati said that once the writers came up with the idea to connect the characters, it just made sense. Britt had been "horrible" so the reveal makes Britt more "sympathetic." Obrecht resents her daughter because Britt could not help her keep her father. In reference to the dynamic between the two, Gati insisted that Obrecht does love Britt, but she does not always show it." According to Gati, Britt needs her mother because of her strength. There are some moments were Obrecht tries to show affection to Britt as a mother but "there's an awkwardness about it" Gati said. Gati described Obrecht's feelings for Britt as "challenging" because even though the feelings exist, those feelings are "minimal at best." However, the actress continued "There is some warmth. She tries." Gati said the "writers open the window a tiny bit - I reach through and then bang, so it's very contrived. There's an attempt, but she's not successful." Obrecht takes steps to bond with her daughter after finding out about her engagement to Nikolas Cassadine (Tyler Christopher) and Gati said "She's looked in the mirror and seen the mistakes that she's made." Obrecht comes up with a new plan to benefit Britt and Gati said "She would go to great, great lengths to protect the child and to protect Britt, and defend her daughter as much as she can. She's trying to make up for lost time." However, the scheme makes things worse.

In 2014, Obrecht is revealed to be the estranged younger sister of the wealthy Madeline Reeves, played by Donna Mills, and the biological mother of Madeline's "son," Nathan West (Ryan Paevey). Gati said the jail scenes between Obrecht and Madeline give another layer to why the character is the way she is; she had a "sister and the parents from hell." Carlivati explained that "Obrecht is feeling a lot of emotions about" Nathan whom she for some reason gave up. Despite her feelings, Nathan has trouble trusting Obrecht, not only because her reputation precedes her, but also because of his troubled relationship with Madeline who he believed was his mother. Nathan's initial rejection "almost makes you feel sorry for Obrecht," Carlivati said.

During the 2014 Nurses Ball episodes, the character of Dr. Obrecht was heavily featured in the musical episodes where she performed a rendition "Always on My Mind" for her children. Ron Carlivati accredited Anna Cascio, one of the members of the writing team for suggesting that Obrecht sing to her children and the song choice. Carlivati described the performance as a "confession to her children that she was a bad mother" or "An apology" Gati said. Because the character of Nathan was just becoming familiar to viewers, the performance creates an immediate "relationship between the brother and sister" and also displays how uncomfortable they are with Obrecht showing "real emotion." It helps them to understand that she does feel some kind of affection for them. Obrecht is thinking, "Wow. I made a step. There is progress. It's tiny, but it's huge. It's one small gesture, but it spoke volumes."

=== Relationships ===
Kathleen Gati revealed that she first learned of the plans of Obrecht's relationship with the infamous Cesar Faison (Anders Hove) in January 2013 and she was immediately "ecstatic." Ron Carlivati revealed that Obrecht's expansion started out as her being a "talk-to" for Faison when he is masquerading as Duke Lavery (Ian Buchanan) between October and December 2013. In March 2013 after Obrecht's connection to Britt was revealed and fans were left to speculate about her paternity, Regan Cellura said that Obrect's "unwavering loyalty" Faison was a bit "telling". Gati said that Obrecht idolizes Faison and looks at him as a "god." Of their history, the actress said that "she idolized from the time they were very young." From her point of view, Faison has done "amazing things. Even if they're dark and cruel and horrible characters, she's fascinated by him." Faison and Obrecht are two people who "found each other in their evilness." Even though Faison moves on and falls in love again, Obrecht never gets over him. "She's a one-man woman who has been focused on him and hasn't taken her eye off him. Even if she wanted to explore other romantic interests, Gati said "[Obrecht] needs him." Faison is Obrecht's "Achilles' heel." Gati explained, "The only time Obrecht is much is when she sees him or hears his name. She becomes like a puppy. It's like Pavlov's dog." According to Kathleen Gati, it is Obrecht's "twisted affection" for Faison that allows the audience to embrace her. Fans can understand that she is upset because "she's been dumped and disrespected and not cared about and put aside." Not only can viewers relate to her pain, but some can also defend the pain she causes. In reference to Obrecht's admiration for Faison, Gati said "Faison is her everything." The actress explained in character that "I have admired him, loved him." Faison is "her god, her genius." Gati said Faison asking Obrecht to wear the "Anna" mask to have sex with him is the "ultimate rejection" and "beyond humiliating. Then that awkward moment trying to seduce him, and she is not that good at it, and then trying anyway she can, and being totally rejected." Gati said that the scenes are a "turning point" for her character and she questioned "how much [Obrecht] would take from Faison."

The character gets another love interest when the writers reintroduce Thaao Penghlis as Victor Cassadine, with whom Obrecht also shares a past. Gati was immediately open to the idea of a potential romance. The actress confirmed that Victor's arrival definitely awakened some kind of "unfamiliar" feelings in Obrecht. Before Victor, it is assumed that Faison was the only man to ever catch Obrecht's eye. Gati said Obrecht is not accustomed to getting that kind of attention from a man. "Don't treat me kindly, because I don't know what to do with that!" the actress stated in character. When it comes to Obrecht's attraction to Victor, Gati said "He's kind, he's attractive... and they're mental equals. They both have this acute sense of evil. It turns her on." Following the revelation about Nathan being Obrecht's son, there was immediate speculation about Victor being the father. In July 2014, Carlivati said that there was a lot to "dig into" when it comes to Obrecht and her relationship with Victor.

=== Feud with Anna and chief of staff ===
Obrecht immediately despises Anna Devane (Finola Hughes) because of Faison's obsession and love for her. Gati said that Obrecht's disdain for Anna would be "on-going for the rest of her life." It all stems from the pain of having lost Faison's affections to Anna at such a young age. They had a relationship and even created a child together and as far as Obrecht is concerned, Faison was "tainted" by Anna making Liesl look like "chopped liver." Gati explained that the hatred would last because Anna is a constant reminder of what she could not give Faison. Obrecht even goes so far as wear a prosthetic "Anna" mask in an attempt to trick Faison in being intimate with her. Though Obrecht hates Anna, "torturing her with Robin is more appealing than killing her" because she is helping Faison.

Ron Carlivati revealed that when he first pitched the idea of making Obrecht the chief of staff at General Hospital, executive producer Frank Valentini and the network's executives didn't take him seriously thinking it would be "impossible." However, Carlivati was willing to take the risk because it "galvanizes the entire hospital against a common enemy" in Obrecht. It also gives Obrecht a permanent place within the show. The scribe revealed that he had always imagined the $88 million that Jerry Jacks (Sebastian Roché) had extorted from Port Charles the town prior to his disappearance in 2012 had been floating around; Obrecht manages to get her hands on some of that money and uses it to invest in General Hospital. Carlivati likened Obrecht becoming chief of staff to Heather Locklear as Amanda Woodward on Melrose Place buying the complex. "You put the most hated person in the position of power over everybody else, and that creates story." Because Obrecht is such a "polarizing force" at the hospital, Carlivati thought it would be appropriate to have her hijack the opening number at the annual Nurses Ball, a celebrated event in the show's history. It was at the suggestion of one of the writers, Chris Van Etten that Obrecht perform "Willkommen". Carlivati was nervous about even getting invested in the potential performance because he feared that Valentini and the musical director, Paul Glass might not be able to get the rights to the music.

== Storylines ==
Obrecht first appears as the director of the clinic where Luke Spencer (Anthony Geary) is searching for his friend Anna Devane (Finola Hughes) who has come in search of her presumed dead daughter, Robin (Kimberly McCullough). After the two leave, Obrecht is seen speaking with a man who looks identical to Anna's great love, the late Duke Lavery (Ian Buchanan). It is eventually revealed that Duke is actually Cesar Faison (Anders Hove) in disguise, trying to win Anna's affections. Faison returns to Switzerland to reprimand Obrecht when Robin manages to escape briefly and contact her husband, Patrick Drake (Jason Thompson). In December 2012, after Faison is arrested, she stabs Robin's father, Robert Scorpio (Tristan Rogers) with a dose of a lethal drug leaving him comatose before delivering Robin to Jerry Jacks (Sebastian Roché).

In March 2013, Obrecht comes to Port Charles where she reunites with her daughter, Britt Westbourne (Kelly Thiebaud) who has been dumped by Patrick in favor of Sabrina Santiago (Teresa Castillo). Thinking it will help her daughter get Patrick back, Obrecht has Britt announce that she is pregnant with Patrick's child at the Nurses Ball and it also revealed that Faison is Britt's father. It is eventually revealed that Patrick is not the child's father because Obrecht faked the paternity test. Obrecht resurfaces several months later to warn Britt that her schemes are about to exposed. In addition to helping her daughter, Obrecht also schemes to get revenge Anna for stealing Faison's affections from her. Her attempt to poison Anna ends with Duke falling into a coma just as he points the finger at Obrecht. Fortunately for Obrecht, she is able to avoid being arrested.

Obrecht resurfaces to congratulate Britt on the giving birth to her son, Ben only to learn that Britt has given up on Patrick and revealed the truth about the paternity. Obrecht then kidnaps the child and leaves him with Robin on Cassadine Island. Obrecht also manages to sneak Faison out of prison by disguising herself as Anna and introduces him to their grandson. Devastated by Faison's rejection again after he wants her to wear the Anna mask in order to have sex. Obrecht along with Faison, Robin and Jerry Jacks go to Port Charles where they move in with Britt's boyfriend, Nikolas Cassadine (Tyler Christopher) as they wait for Robin to develop a cure for Jerry's plutonium poisoning. Obrecht and Faison later take Duke hostage in the catacombs. Duke tricks Obrecht into letting him go only for Nikolas, Faison and Anna to show up. Obrecht is finally sent to jail where she tries to blackmail Britt into getting her released by threatening to reveal that Ben is the biological child of Lulu (Emme Rylan) and Dante Falconeri (Dominic Zamprogna) conceived from their stolen embryo. Afterwards, she meets Robin's longtime best friend Sonny Corinthos (Maurice Benard) across from her cell where he was later released.

With the help for her former flame, Victor Cassadine (Thaao Penghlis), Obrecht secures her freedom and is appointed chief of staff at General Hospital after Sonny was released. During Nikolas and Britt's engagement party, it is revealed that Ben is Dante and Lulu's and Obrecht kidnaps him and forces Elizabeth Webber (Rebecca Herbst) to hide them. Obrecht shoots Elizabeth as Ben is rescued and while in lock-up, Obrehct is reunited with her estranged sister, Madeline Reeves (Donna Mills). When Obrecht sees Madeline's son, Detective Nathan West (Ryan Paevey), she immediately realizes that he is the son she gave to Madeline to raise. Obrecht later works out a deal where she agrees to turn over Dante and Lulu's last viable embryo in exchange for immunity for herself and Britt. Nathan immediately rejects the notion of Obrecht being his mother but she tries to reach out to both of her children at the Nurses Ball. After Nathan is kidnapped during a case, Obrecht accuses Anna of killing Faison and trying to take her son away. Obrecht reaches out to Victor for help but he instead questions if Nathan is his son. Obrecht figures out that Victor has Nathan and tips the PCPD off about Victor's whereabouts. Obrecht confronts Victor and confirms his suspicion that Nathan is his son but the DNA test proves she is lying. Victor is about to kill Obrecht until Anna comes to arrest him and Obrecht shoots him.

She meets Valentin Cassadine (James Patrick Stuart) who later becomes her nephew-in-law by marriage to her niece Nina Reeves (Michelle Stafford) and gains Charlotte Cassadine (Scarlett Fernandez) as her great-niece. Obrecht reveals that she needs Nathan to believe the lie because the truth is much worse, that Faison is Nathan's biological father after Obrecht's new friend Janice Lomax (Shari Belafonte) resigned from her position as Mayor of Port Charles leaving the city unprotected. She later visits Nelle Benson (Chloe Lanier) in prison.

== Reception ==
"Truly, one of the standout performances of the year. Gati played Dr. Obrecht as the evilest woman on the planet, then showed her emotional side when Faison (Anders Hove) asked her to wear the “Anna” mask in order to have sex with him, plus did her rendition in blonde wig of Peggy Lee’s “Is That All There Is?”, and then sang “Au Tannenbaum” from jail on the Christmas episode. And that is just a few of our favorite things, that the multi-talented Gati bestowed upon the viewers in 2013!"

— On-Air On-Soaps praise of Gati's performance. (2013)

In October 2013, ABC Soaps In Depth ranked the character at #5 in the "5 Things We're Loving" section and said Gati's "Obrecht makes being bad look oh so good!" Soap Opera Digest gave General Hospital the "Best Villains" award for 2013 and Obrecht was among the favorites. The magazine raved that "Establishing the perverse cronyism of Faison, Helena, Jerry and Dr. Obrecht was a stroke of creative genius, but each character also shined individually." The magazine praised the character saying, "Obrecht continued her scene-stealing rise to villainous power by maneuvering daughter Britt like a chess piece, tossing off cruel one-liners with expert precision and rocking the heck out of that Anna [Devane] mask." Rosemary Rossi said "Sure, Obrecht is a villainess. But viewers delight in her wickedness rather than just deplore her machinations." Gati shared the title of Performer of the Week with Anders Hove for their portrayal of Obrecht and Faison during scenes in which Obrecht tried to seduce Faison wearing an Anna mask. Editor Stephanie Sloane described the performances as "uniquely but equally mesmerizing." While Hove is definitely known for his legendary style, Sloane raved that Gati "has quickly become one of the trustiest weapons in GH's arsenal, via her full-bodied embrace of Obrecht's matter-of-fact cruelty." On-Air On-Soaps said Gati gave the "Best Overall Performance By a Supporting Actress." Of Obrecht's familial connections, Maria Ciaccia said "[she] is now 'connected' and here to stay. That's a tribute to the actress because this was probably a short-term role." Ciaccia praised the actress and said "there's something about Gati as Dr. Obrecht -- we just love having her around." On-Air On-Soaps praised the actress for her portrayal of Obrecht during scenes in which the character schemed to take out her rival Anna Devane, played by Finola Hughes. Soaps In Depth said "what makes Obrecht a fan favorite is the contrast between her evil deeds and the delight she takes in them." Michael Fairman praised Gati and head writer, Ron Carlivati for their creation of "one [of] the most fascinating characters in Port Charles."

"There are many different kinds of villains on daytime: nasty, snide, self-deluded, pathologically dishonest and even downright vicious. But very few are sheer fun. The Machiavellian Dr. Obrecht is one. Unburdened by any moral compass, she happily employs any means to her end. Plus she’s in on several of GH’s big plot secrets such as who is the father of her daughter Britt’s child. This is a great performance by the spirited Gati."

— Connie Passalacqua on Dr. Obrecht (2013)

In reference to the character being named chief of staff, Fairman responded "How on earth will the GH writing team explain" the twist? Connie Passalacqua said "I literally screamed" at the reveal that Britt and Obrecht were mother and daughter. Passalacqua listed Obrecht as one of her favorite characters in soaps during the summer of 2013. In August 2013, The TV Addict said Gati portrayed Obrecht to "delightfully campy perfection." Michael Fairman praised Gati "who is able to deliver some pretty outrageous dialog, and wonderful one-liners" On-Air On-Soaps was shocked that Gati did not make the pre-nominations list for Daytime Emmy Awards Supporting Actress category. Michael Fairman praised the actress for her opening performance of "Willkommen" at the 2014 Nurses Ball. Fairman described Gati as "one of the biggest and most unique standouts on the canvas of the ABC soap opera!" Fans voted Gati's rendition of "Willkommen" as the best performance at the ball on a Daytime Confidential poll. The blog also listed Obrecht at #15 on the list of "15 Soap Opera Moms Who Deserve Nothing For Mother's Day." Luke Kerr of Daytime Confidential likened the character of Liesl Obrecht to Olenna Tyrell (Diana Rigg) on Game of Thrones. While Obrecht's fans don't always come off perfectly, "like her Westeros counterpart, she has ensured her family is taken care of with one hood move after another."
