= Maxie Jones =

Fictional character

- General Hospital character
- Kirsten Storms as Maxie Jones
- Portrayed by: Chelsey and Kahley Cuff (1990–1991); Ashley and Jessica Clark (1992); Elaine and Melanie Silver (1992–1993); Robyn Richards (1993–2001, 2002–2004); Danica Stewart (2002); Kirsten Storms (2005–2026); Jen Lilley (2011–2012); Molly Burnett (2016, 2018); Nicole Paggi (2023–2025)
- Duration: 1990–2026
- First appearance: November 5, 1990
- Last appearance: March 13, 2026
- Created by: Gene Palumbo
- Introduced by: Joseph Hardy (1990); Wendy Riche (1993); Jill Farren Phelps (2002, 2005)
- Book appearances: Robin's Diary; The Secret Life of Damian Spinelli
- Spin-off appearances: Port Charles; General Hospital: Night Shift
- Robyn Richards as Maxie Jones
In-universe information
- Other names: Mariah Maximilliana Jones; Maxie Hunter; Kayla McHenry
- Occupation: Creative director; Junior Editor; Editor-in-chief; Wedding planner; Personal shopper; Assistant to Kate Howard; Retail clerk; Waitress; Hospital volunteer
- Family: Scorpio/Jones family
- Parents: Frisco Jones; Felicia Jones
- Stepfather: Mac Scorpio
- Brothers: Cody Bell (step)
- Sisters: Georgie Jones
- Spouse: Matt Hunter (2012); Nathan West (2017–2018)
- Sons: James West
- Daughters: Georgie Spinelli; Bailey Jones
- Grandparents: Peter Cummings; Andrew Jones Sr. Bertha Ramirez; Cindy Jones
- Aunts and uncles: Tony Jones; Robert Scorpio (step)
- First cousins: B. J. Jones; Lucas Jones (adoptive); Robin Scorpio; Sasha Gilmore (step)

Maxie Jones is a fictional character from General Hospital, an American soap opera on the ABC network. She is the eldest daughter of supercouple Frisco Jones and Felicia Cummings, raised most of her life by Mac Scorpio. The role was first portrayed by Robyn Richards for eleven years, from 1993 to 2004. The role was then recast with Kirsten Storms in 2005. In 2011, Jen Lilley assumed the role when Storms took an extended leave; she returned to the role the following year. In 2026, Maxie departed the canvas when she relocated to Australia with Damian Spinelli (Bradford Anderson) and their children.

== Casting ==
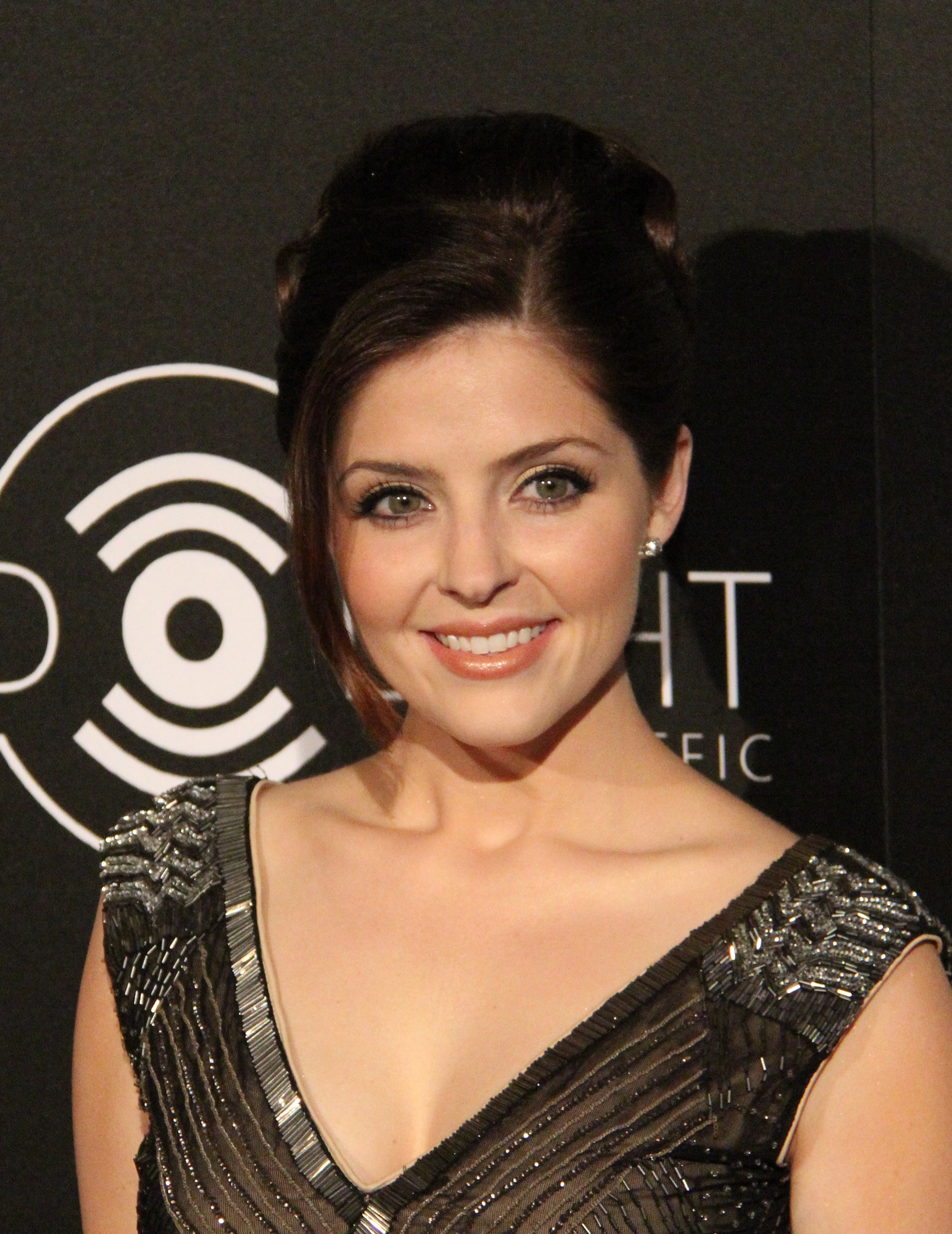
Jen Lilley (pictured) was cast as Maxie in 2011, while Kirsten Storms was out on extended medical leave.

The character was initially portrayed by child actors Chelsey and Kahley Cuff from 1990 to 1991, Ashley and Jessica Clark from May 22 to November 19, 1992, and Elaine and Melanie Silver from December 24, 1992, to April 22, 1993. Robyn Richards then assumed the role on June 4, 1993, and last appeared on December 24, 2001. In March 2002, after nine years as the character, ABC announced their decision to release Richards from her contract in order to rapidly age the character, with plans to have actress Danica Stewart take over. Stewart debuted on March 13, 2002. However, within months, it was announced that the network had chosen to have Richards stay after Stewart was negatively received by viewers. Stewart departed on July 16, 2002. Richards returned as Maxie on September 3, 2002. Richards had made her final appearance on July 16, 2004.

In March 2005, it was announced that the role had been recast with former Days of Our Lives actress Kirsten Storms, known for her five year stint as Belle Black, who made her debut on May 23, 2005. In September 2011, Storms took an extended medical leave for an unspecified amount of time, resulting in the temporary recasting of the character with actress Jen Lilley. Storms briefly departed on September 27, 2011, with Lilley debuting on September 28, 2011. Four months later, Storms was said to be returning, however, her return was delayed and Lilley announced that she would be remaining in the role for the foreseeable future. In June 2012, Storms was rumored to be in potential talks to rejoin the cast. The following month, Lilley announced that she had completed her stint as the character. In a personal YouTube video, Lilley tearfully thanked her fans, stating: "Thank you for making my departure from GH easier. [...] And even though I'm crying, they are happy tears." She made her last appearance on August 10, 2012. Storms later returned on September 5.

During an interview with Dan J. Kroll of Soap Central Live, Lilley spoke about how she had no idea about her being a recast for Storms or the character of Maxie. She stated:

I was absolutely terrified, because I didn't know that I was auditioning for the role of Maxie the day before, and they kind of came out of the room after the audition and they're like, 'OK, by the way, it's the role of Maxie - you have a two-hour orientation, it starts right now. [...] And then I just remember sitting in my dressing room the next morning, having memorized 30 pages but being freaked out, and I remember thinking, 'There were two other girls at the callback, and I bet that they would want to do this role, and I don't know if I can do it, and I'm so scared.' I'm sitting in my dressing room sweating, and I remember thinking, 'I should go up to casting and just tell them to give it to one of the other girls, because I don't know if I can do this.' And then I Googled it, and it was all over Google that I was the replacement, and I was like, 'Oh God, I'm stuck! I'm stuck! I'm stuck!'

In May 2016, it was reported that Storms would again take temporary leave from the role; actress Molly Burnett was cast in the role. Burnett assumed the role on July 5, 2016, and departed nearly a month later on July 29, 2016. Storms returned in the role on August 3, 2016.

In March 2017, it was reported that Storms would take a third temporary leave from the role; with the role not being recast during this latest absence. Storms began her hiatus on February 16, 2017. In June 2017, it was reported that Storms would be returning to the role as Maxie following her hiatus with the show, airing on July 24, 2017. In May 2018, it was announced that Burnett would once again step-in for Storms. Burnett appeared on June 1 and 4, 2018.

During the December 27, 2023, episode Nicole Paggi temporarily played the role instead of Storms. She further appeared in the January 5, 2024, episode. On July 3, 2025, Paggi returned to the role; according to TV Insider, she will appear in two additional episodes on July 30 and August 13; per the report, Storms is set to resume the role during the week of August 18. In response to Paggi's return, Storms told Soap Opera Digest she was "taken aback" by the decision, but was happy to know that Maxie would still be included on the canvas in her absence. On July 7, she addressed her absence on Instagram, explaining she had relocated to Tennessee; she further detailed she had filmed her final scenes for the year as Maxie, and hoped to be back on set by the end of the year in what she teased as a "kind of incredible" storyline. She also addressed her status with the soap would remain unchanged, despite her relocation.

Storms resumed filming in January 2026, with scenes concerning Maxie's return airing from February 12 to March 13 of the same year. In June 2026, Storms took to social media and shared that due to ongoing personal decisions, she did not feel comfortable returning to Los Angeles to continue filming in the role. As a result, Maxie was written out of the serial during the July 23 episode.

== Storylines ==
=== 1990–2005 ===
Mariah Maximilliana Jones is born on Halloween night in 1990 and named after her maternal great-grandparents Maximilian and Mariah Ramirez. Her Godparents are named as Sean Donely (John Reilly) and Anna Devane (Finola Hughes) at her Christening. In 1994, she suffers from Kawasaki disease and requires a heart transplant. Meanwhile, her cousin B.J. Jones (Brighton Hertford) is in a car accident, leaving her brain-dead. Test results prove B.J.'s heart to be a match for Maxie. B.J.'s parents, Bobbie (Jacklyn Zeman) and Tony Jones (Brad Maule), agree to take B.J. off life support and donate her heart to Maxie. During this time, Maxie's sister Georgie is conceived, but their father Frisco Jones (Jack Wagner) leaves town again soon after.

Maxie's first crush is on Lucky Spencer (Jonathan Jackson). In 2003, she dates her new crush, Kyle Ratcliffe (Andrew St. John). Kyle coerces Maxie to steal pills from the hospital. While she loses her virginity to him, he tapes them having sex and later posts the video on the internet. Maxie is furious when she finds out, but later forgives Kyle. Later on, Maxie plans to sleep with her adoptive cousin Lucas Jones (Ryan Carnes) to prevent her sister Georgie (Lindze Letherman) from sleeping with him. Maxie also flirts with Zander Smith (Chad Brannon) and helps him avoid the law. She briefly has a crush on Nikolas Cassadine (Tyler Christopher).

In 2005, Maxie (Storms) faces complications with her heart transplant. While in the hospital, Maxie meets Jesse Beaudry (Matt Marraccini), who claims to be an undercover cop blamed for a murder he didn't commit. Maxie helps Jesse and they go on the run. By the time they arrive home, they have fallen in love with each other, much to Mac's dismay.

=== 2006–2008 ===
After Jesse dies in the line of duty, Maxie is devastated, and falls into a dark place, partying all the time. She turns to Jesse's partner Lucky for comfort, resulting in an affair. Lucky is married to Elizabeth Webber (Rebecca Herbst), but Maxie still goes after him. When Maxie finds out Lucky has a pain pill addiction, she provides him pills in exchange for sex. When Lucky decides to go to rehab and win Elizabeth back, Maxie pretends to be pregnant to hold onto Lucky. She fakes a miscarriage, and Lucky later finds out the truth. During the Metro Court hostage crisis, Maxie ends up trapped with one of the gunmen, later revealed to be Cooper Barrett (Jason Gerhardt). Maxie covers for him afterwards, and they eventually start a relationship. When Maxie suspects Cooper has taken interest in Maxie's enemy Lulu Spencer (Julie Marie Berman), she propositions Cooper's former Army buddy Logan Hayes (Josh Duhon), saying that if he can get Lulu to sleep with him, then she will sleep with Logan. Maxie eventually tries to call off the bet after Cooper admits how much he cares for her. However, unable to help herself after realizing Logan is in love with Lulu, she blackmails Logan and sleeps with him.

Later on, Cooper finds Maxie and Logan making out. He tells Maxie that he cannot watch her self-destruct any longer, and ends their relationship. Maxie and Cooper reconcile right before Georgie is murdered. Maxie is grief-stricken, to the point that she belittles her mother at Georgie's funeral for abandoning them. Cooper is suspected of the murder, but Maxie believes he's innocent. When he asks Maxie to leave town with him, she agrees, but she later finds him dead of an apparent suicide. The police further their belief that Cooper was the killer. Maxie refuses to believe this, and teams up with Damian Spinelli (Bradford Anderson) to prove Cooper's innocence. Having once been enemies, Maxie and Spinelli become close, and Spinelli develops a crush on Maxie. They are successful in their mission, proving Cooper was killed by Diego Alcazar (Ignacio Serricchio), who also murdered Georgie. Maxie gets a job as Kate Howard (Megan Ward)'s assistant. She is soon joined by Lulu, and starts to hit on Lulu's boyfriend Johnny Zacchara (Brandon Barash) to make her jealous. Logan begins stalking Lulu, upset about their breakup. He blames Maxie for what happened, and attacks her at the Crimson office. Lulu witnesses this, and Logan comes after her. Lulu accidentally stabs him to death in self-defense. Johnny takes the blame to protect Lulu. Lulu slowly starts to break down and is admitted to a mental institution. Maxie visits her, and they slowly become friends. After Lulu is released, she and Maxie move into an apartment together.

=== 2009–2011 ===
Maxie becomes friends with Spinelli, and starts to slowly fall for him, despite Mac objecting and her own uncertainty. She also flirts with Johnny, but the two never establish a relationship. Maxie eventually starts dating Spinelli. He proposes just as they become exclusive, and Maxie accepts, despite her hesitation. Spinelli finds out Maxie's feelings, and declares he will not marry her at their wedding ceremony. The two agree to take their relationship slowly, calling off the wedding. Maxie helps set up an art show for the artist Franco (James Franco), on behalf of Crimson. The two end up sleeping together, and Maxie immediately regrets it. She starts avoiding her family and Spinelli, unable to deal with her guilt. Eventually, Spinelli finds out, and says he can forgive Maxie, but their relationship remains strained. Hoping to reignite their romance, Spinelli sets up a fake case for Maxie to help him with, but the plan goes awry, and they end up trapped, with Spinelli injured and Maxie suffering from hypothermia. When they're finally taken to the hospital, Maxie finds out she has pneumonia, and it's putting a strain on her heart. Fortunately, she recovers, but Spinelli remains guilt-ridden. When Maxie feels ignored by Spinelli, she tries to get his attention back by staging a kiss with Matt Hunter (Jason Cook) so that Spinelli will fight for her. Instead, he breaks up with Maxie. Matt and Maxie begin to casually date, choosing not to be exclusive.

=== 2012–2013 ===
Spinelli still cares for Maxie, and gets shot by Lisa Niles (Brianna Brown) while trying to protect Maxie. She starts growing closer to Matt during this time. When Lisa is killed, Maxie is a suspect, along with Matt and several others. When Maxie's cousin, Robin Scorpio (Kimberly McCullough), is killed in a gas explosion, Maxie believes she was responsible for the gas leak, and tries to get herself arrested for Robin's murder. When this fails, she claims to have killed Lisa, and gets sent to prison. Spinelli tries to prove Maxie's innocence, and discovers the real killer was Matt. Maxie asks him to keep quiet and let her take the fall. Spinelli refuses, and turns Matt in. Maxie is released, on the condition that she testifies that she saw Matt kill Lisa. Angry, Maxie marries Matt to avoid testifying against him. However, Matt turns himself in, and goes to prison. He tells Maxie he'll annul their marriage, but she refuses.

Though Spinelli tries to reach out to Maxie, she avoids him. Spinelli finally tells Maxie off, saying that he's done wasting his love on her. Maxie eventually gets a pep talk from both Lulu and her mother that makes her realize she loves Spinelli. Hoping to win Spinelli back, she annuls her marriage to Matt and confesses her feelings to Spinelli. Spinelli turns Maxie down now, and starts dating Ellie Trout (Emily Wilson). Heartbroken, Maxie tries to move on by being a surrogate for Lulu and Dante Falconeri (Dominic Zamprogna). Maxie ended up miscarrying as their surrogate, and found Spinelli upset after believing Ellie broke up with him. The two sleep together, but Spinelli later reconciles with Ellie. Maxie discovers she's pregnant with Spinelli's child, and chooses to pass off her child as Dante and Lulu's. As the pregnancy keeps advancing, though, Maxie becomes more attached to her unborn child. She gives birth to a baby girl, whom Dante and Lulu name Connie Falconeri.

When the truth about Connie comes out, Maxie and Spinelli decide that they want their daughter back, but Lulu wants to keep the baby. All four go to court, where Lulu and Maxie attack each other. The judge grants Spinelli sole custody of Connie, with Maxie being barred from seeing her daughter for six months. Devastated over losing her daughter, Maxie tries to commit suicide, but she's stopped by Robin, revealed to be alive. When Ellie finds a job in Portland, Spinelli is reluctant to follow because of Maxie and their daughter. However, Maxie encourages him to go with the baby so she won't violate the court ruling. Before leaving with Ellie, Spinelli reveals he's decided to rename their daughter Georgie, in honor of Maxie's sister. After they leave, Maxie decides to leave town to find a way to move on.

=== 2014–2017 ===
Maxie returns home with her boyfriend, Levi Dunkleman (Zachary Garred), a self-help guru. At the same time, she starts falling for Detective Nathan West (Ryan Paevey). Levi and Nathan clash frequently over Maxie, specifically of Maxie regaining custody of Georgie. Maxie is hesitant to try and get her daughter back, because of her past decisions. The indecision causes her to lose custody of Georgie for another six months. Soon after, Levi is threatened with deportation when his visa expires. Maxie plans to marry him, but on their wedding day, Levi shows his true colors, kidnapping Maxie and Lulu. Maxie discovers that "Levi" is actually Peter Harrell Jr., and he manipulated Maxie to get ahold of the Aztec jewels owned by her mother. Maxie is saved by Nathan, while Levi is killed. Maxie realizes how supportive Nathan has been to her, and the two start dating. With Nathan's help, Maxie regains custody of Georgie.

Spinelli returned to town with Georgie, and told Maxie he was hoping they could have a second chance after Ellie broke up with him. Maxie was conflicted between Spinelli and Nathan, but made a rash decision and broke up with Nathan after catching him and Spinelli fighting over Maxie. She and Spinelli tried to resume a relationship, but Maxie was still attracted to Nathan. Things came to a head when Ellie came back to town to get Spinelli back, and started dating Nathan. Maxie became jealous, and realized that she was falling in love with Nathan, and had moved on from Spinelli. Spinelli agreed, and the two broke up amicably, while Maxie reconciled with Nathan. Maxie and Nathan got engaged, but their wedding was sidetracked when Claudette Beaulieu (Bree Williamson), Nathan's ex-wife, arrived in town. Fortunately, their relationship remained intact and they got married with their families present.

=== 2017–2026 ===
Maxie was traveling for work, and was absent for quite sometime in the beginning of their marriage. She came back, determined to find Ask Man Landers, a blogger who gave advice that inadvertently led to her mother and Mac getting caught for public indecency. She discovered that Nurse Amy Driscoll (Risa Dorken) was the writer, and that Nathan was posing as the face to help Amy out. She supported them, and later helped them out of a jam when the publisher threatened to pull the book deal for the blog.

Maxie found out she was pregnant at Thanksgiving, and she and Nathan began preparing for the baby's arrival. Nathan then found out that his father was international crime lord Cesar Faison (Anders Hove), and decided to try and capture him by drawing him out. Maxie had her doubts, though, and asked Lulu not to help Nathan. Unfortunately, this failed, and Faison showed up in town, and took Maxie hostage. Nathan tried to stop Faison, and got shot. He later died in the hospital, devastating Maxie. She blamed Lulu, and their friendship was strained. Maxie bonded with Peter August (Wes Ramsey), Lulu's boss, who felt guilty for publishing the article that led to Nathan's death. After the Nurses' Ball, Peter drove Maxie home when she went into labor. Peter helped Maxie deliver her baby boy, who Maxie named James, in honor of Nathan. Maxie found out that Peter was actually Faison's son, and he was Faison's target the night Nathan got shot. Peter apologized to Maxie, but Maxie found it hard to forgive him for causing Nathan's death.

== Reception ==
In 2009, Storms was nominated for a Daytime Emmy for her portrayal of Maxie. In 2023, Charlie Mason from Soaps She Knows placed Maxie at #29 on his ranked list of General Hospital’s 40+ Greatest Characters of All Time, commenting that "She’s been naughty. She’s been nice. But one thing ~~Frisco Jones~~ Mac and Felicia Scorpio’s daughter has always been — and will always be — is fashionable. A heart that big and beautiful never goes out of style."
