= Nikolas Cassadine =

Fictional character from General Hospital

- General Hospital character
- Adam Huss as Nikolas Cassadine
- Portrayed by: Tyler Christopher (1996–1999, 2003–2016); Coltin Scott (1999–2003); Chris Beetem (2005); Nick Stabile (2016); Marcus Coloma (2019–2023); Adam Huss (2021–2024)
- Duration: 1996–2011; 2013–2016; 2019–2024
- First appearance: July 15, 1996
- Last appearance: August 27, 2024
- Created by: Robert Guza, Jr. and Karen Harris
- Introduced by: Wendy Riche (1996); Frank Valentini (2013, 2019, 2023)
- Book appearances: The Secret Life of Damian Spinelli
- Spin-off appearances: General Hospital: Twist of Fate (1996)
- Tyler Christopher as Nikolas Cassadine

- Marcus Coloma as Nikolas Cassadine
In-universe information
- Other names: Nikolas Mikail Stavrosovich Cassadine; Niall Carradine (2016)
- Occupation: Prince of Greek nobility; Businessman
- Family: Cassadine; Webber
- Parents: Stavros Cassadine; Laura Webber
- Stepfather: Kevin Collins
- Half-brothers: Lucky Spencer
- Half-sisters: Lulu Spencer
- Spouse: Lydia Karenin (2003); Mary Bishop (2004); Emily Quartermaine (2004–2005); Hayden Barnes (2016–2019); Ava Jerome (2020–2023)
- Sons: Spencer Cassadine; Ace Cassadine
- Grandfathers: Mikkos Cassadine; Gordon Gray; Rick Webber (adoptive)
- Grandmothers: Helena Cassadine; Lesley Webber
- Uncles: Stefan Cassadine; Valentin Cassadine; Martin Grey; Cyrus Renault; Mike Webber (adoptive); Rick Webber Jr. (adoptive)
- Aunts: Alexis Davis; Kristina Cassadine; Irina Cassadine; Amy Vining
- Nephews: Cameron Webber (adoptive); Jake Webber (legal); Aiden Spencer; Rocco Falconeri
- Nieces: Charlotte Cassadine
- First cousins: Sam McCall; Kristina Davis; Molly Lansing; Charlotte Cassadine
- Other relatives: Tony Cassadine; Victor Cassadine

Nikolas Cassadine is a fictional character from General Hospital, an American soap opera on the ABC network. Originated by actor Tyler Christopher in 1996, he left the show on July 14, 1999. Due to Nikolas' importance on the soap, he was immediately replaced by Coltin Scott on July 20, 1999. Scott left the role on April 16, 2003, as Christopher made his return on April 21, 2003. Chris Beetem temporarily played the role in 2005. Christopher vacated the role on July 28, 2011, after he was let go from the series. Christopher once again reprised the role on a recurring basis in honor of the soaps' fiftieth anniversary; he was later upgraded to a series regular. Actor Nick Stabile took claim of the role in June 2016 in Christopher's absence. In 2019, Marcus Coloma was cast in the role as a series regular, with Adam Huss temporarily stepping in 2021–2023. Coloma departed in January 2023. In August 2023, Huss returned to the role.

Created by head-writers Robert Guza, Jr. and Karen Harris and introduced by executive producer Wendy Riche in 1996 as the illegitimate son of Laura Spencer, the character was immediately popular with audiences. Hailed by Soap Opera Digest as the "Best New Male Character" in 1996, Nikolas's arrival immediately implodes the happy life of supercouple Luke and Laura.

== Casting ==
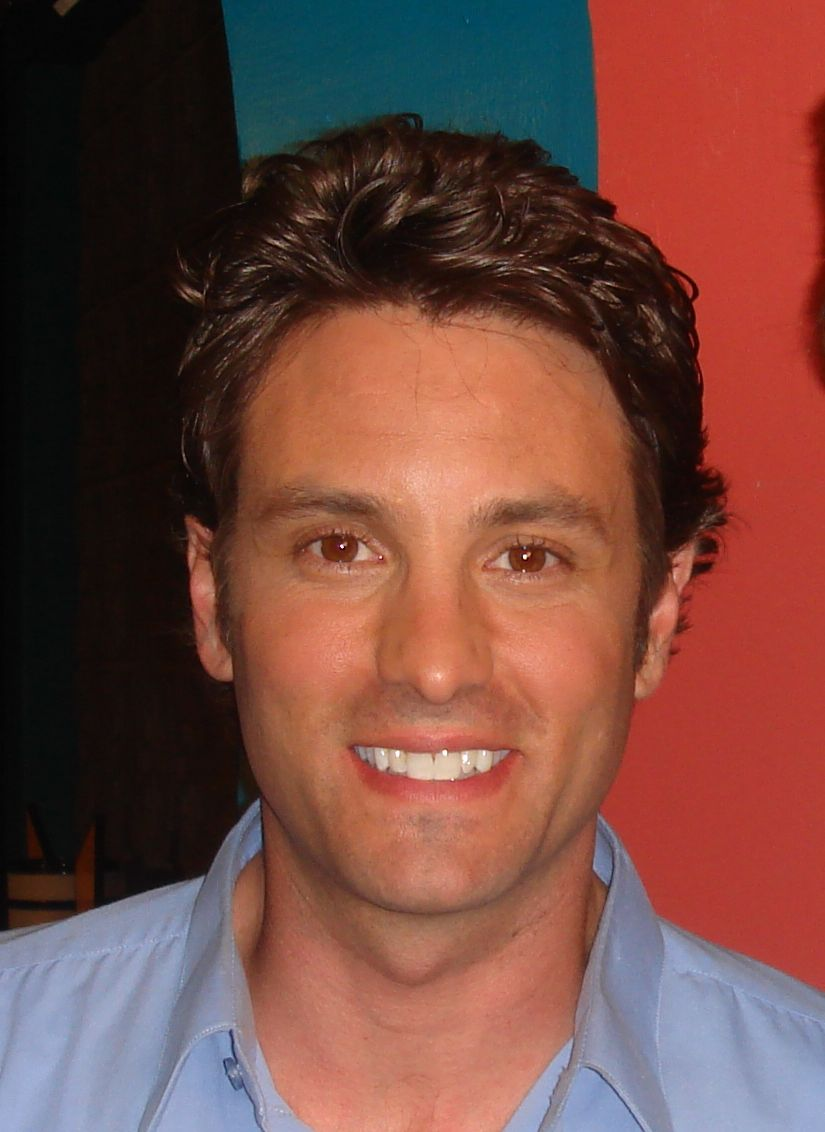
Nick Stabile was temporarily cast into the role of Nikolas from June to July 2016

The role was originated by daytime newcomer Tyler Christopher (then known as Tyler Baker) on July 15, 1996. Christopher tried to audition for the role of Stone Cates in 1993 but was turned away. In April 1996, Christopher was one of several actors to audition for casting director Mark Teschner. Christopher hired an acting coach to prepare him for the audition and worked regularly with General Hospital's onset acting coach, John Homa. In June 1996, Christopher received a call back to read for executive producer Wendy Riche and was later brought back to screen test with several actors, including Stephen Nichols, who would play Stefan. Christopher was hired two days later, signed a three-year contract, and filmed his first scenes in late June 1996. In May 1999, rumors circulated that Christopher would not renew his contract which was set to expire in June. The series had also put out a casting call for an actor similar to Christopher which meant he could potentially be replaced. By the time of Christopher's departure, Nikolas had become integral to the series, a recast was very much needed, and Christopher was immediately replaced by Coltin Scott. Of his casting, Scott said that viewers didn't have any warning. "Tyler was there Monday, and I came in on Tuesday" he said. Though inexperienced, Scott was immediately put to the test opposite Nichols, Geary, and Francis so he got "very comfortable very quickly." After a year without finding work, Scott's mother wanted him to come home. And he promised her he would if he didn't get a job in six months. Scott booked the role of Nikolas six months to the day of his promise to his mother. In late March 2003, Scott would vacate the role in the summer of 2003 after failed contract negotiations. According to his official website, Scott was very upset by the decisions made. At the same time, Christopher also became available and it was an opportunity the series couldn't pass up, revealed executive producer, Jill Farren Phelps. In November 2005, Tyler Christopher underwent surgery for a broken arm and Chris Beetem served as a temporary recast starting on December 6 and lasting five episodes.

In March 2011, Soap Opera Digest reported that Christopher had been let go from the series as he would soon appear on ABC Family's The Lying Game produced by former GH head writer Charles Pratt, Jr. Christopher confirmed the news to Soaps in Depth that he had been released from his contract on Friday March 18, 2011, and the character of Nikolas was to be written out. Christopher's contract was set to expire in June and the date would have marked the beginning of the last 13-week-cycle period in his deal—at which time the network would notify the actor of their decision to offer another contract. While Christopher had previously admitted he was unsure about renewing his contract, he was open to working both shows and thought it was a likely possibility considering they were both under ABC. On-Air On-Soaps also revealed that "cost cutting measures GH" also factored into the decision. "I haven't had time to absorb it. It was pretty unexpected. I didn't really see it coming" the actor said of his firing. In an interview with Soap Opera Digest, Tyler Christopher made it very clear that he was fired from the series and that his recurring role on The Lying Game did not factor into the decision. "I was trying to stay on GH, however that worked out financially" Christopher explained of his expecting to take a pay cut. However, the actor was instead told that a "pay cut was not an option," though it was an option for others. The actor was angry over the decision and said "I felt like I earned my spot as a permanent fixture on the show." Christopher filmed his last scenes on May 20, 2011, and last appeared in June. Christoper revealed that things felt awkward on his last day because "nobody really knew what to say to me." While the manner in which the situation was handled gave Christopher a "bad taste in my mouth," the actor had already agreed to a three episode return stint under newly appointed head writer Garin Wolf by the time his final scenes aired. Those scenes would air in late July 2011.

In January 2013, executive producer Frank Valentini revealed he had met with Christopher about potentially reprising the role of Nikolas in celebration of show's 50th anniversary. In February 2013, Christopher's co-star Nancy Lee Grahn—who played Alexis Davis—revealed that Christopher had been on set. However, there was speculation that Christopher's return was supposed to be a surprise because there was no prior announcement from the network. Christopher himself announced his return on Twitter a month later and reappeared on March 22. "It's an absolute honor" Christopher said of being included in the 50th anniversary storylines. Though the possibility of his return had always been a thought, the actor did not expect anything to come of it. Valentini told Christopher his return would be open ended while the actor awaited news on production for The Lying Game. While renewal of The Lying Game was stalled, Christopher revealed that he would remain with the series longer than planned. Soap Opera Digest announced in June 2013 that Christopher had been placed on contract. In the summer of 2014, Christopher revealed that he would be going on a four-month-long road trip with his family leading to immediate speculation that he would be off screen for the duration and would not affect his airtime. Head writer Ron Carlivati quickly clarified that Christopher's trip would occur during the weeks in which the show went on hiatus.

In May 2016, actor Nick Stabile was temporarily cast in the role of Nikolas, with Christopher being unavailable, for an undisclosed amount of time. Stabile's tenure began on June 17, 2016, and ended on July 19, 2016. In September 2016, Soap Opera Digest reported that contract negotiations between Christopher and the soap had fallen apart, and that he would not be reprising his portrayal of Nikolas. Christopher made his last appearance on June 16, 2016. In 2019, actor Marcus Coloma was cast in the role of Nikolas; he made his first appearance during the October 31, 2019, episode.

On September 29, 2021, Adam Huss portrayed the role of Nikolas, when Coloma was unavailable. In November of the following year, Huss once again stepped into the role, following Coloma testing positive for COVID-19. The following month, after three years on canvas, it was announced Coloma had been let go from the role and he would last appear at the end of January 2023. Daytime Confidential reported Coloma had allegedly refused to tape his final scenes upon learning of his dismissal. In a statement to Deadline Hollywood, a representative for Coloma refuted Daytime Confidential's claims, citing Coloma did not complete filming "due to health issues with his recent Covid exposure" and that "the network graciously agreed that he should not film the remaining few days of the year." Coloma made his last appearance on January 26. Huss assumed the role on January 31, to complete scenes Coloma was unable to film. On March 1, 2023, Huss wrapped his stint as Nikolas. Huss returned during the final moments of the August 31 episode.

== Development ==
=== Characterization ===
"All Greek heroes have a weakness. For Achilles—his heel. For Nikolas Cassadine, his legacy. As the son of Stavros Cassadine and Laura Spencer, Nikolas is both the pampered heir and abandoned son, Stefan's vengeful protégé and Laura's vulnerable little boy, Lesley Lu's savior and Luke's nemesis. With confidence, sensitivity and a youthful restlessness all his own. Tyler Baker reveals Nikolas' contradictory nature. As impressed are we now, we believe that Baker has just begun to scratch the surface of his talent – and his storyline."

— Soap Opera Digest on Nikolas. (1996)

According to Christopher, Nikolas is initially introduced as a "self-assured" teen who comes from money. While he immediately causes trouble, he is not a "villain" but he is "misguided" due to growing up without his parents. Christopher believed the character could go in any direction. In his early years, Nikolas is very "conflicted" and has a certain "sneer" about him but a "sympathy" that can win anyone over. Christopher later voiced his frustrations with playing such a young character and consciously chose to develop Nikolas in more a young man with a "firmer grasp" on his life. He needs to be "more of a man, taking more control" Christopher said. Christopher revealed that it was the character's "complexity" that initially drew him to the role. "Nikolas was sophisticated, and it took it in a different direction than they wanted." While the writers intended for Nikolas to be "stern, hardnosed" and unwilling to allow anyone in, Christopher made the choice to throw in some vulnerability for the character, whether he puts it on display or not. Christopher wanted viewers to like the character despite his bad deeds. Unlike the actor, Nikolas is very "elegant," "refined," and "proper." Nikolas is "the moody, teen-in-turmoil." Robert Schork of Soap Opera Weekly describe Nikolas an "adolescent wise beyond his years" and an "old soul whose sophistication and maturity belie his youthful facade." Nikolas is not comfortable with his royal status at all, and it makes him feel out of place.

=== Paternity ===
In 1998, Nikolas's paternity comes into question when it is revealed that Stefan is his biological father. Not only does it further complicate his relationship with Laura, but Christopher said Nikolas could be "angry" or "grateful to discover that he has a father after all these years of thinking he didn't." The revelation drives a wedge between Nikolas and his family until he realizes that the family he is running from is the family he has always wanted. The paternity story is key to Nikolas's evolution as a character. Christopher was actually aware of the plot twist when he joined the show and kept the secret until the onscreen reveal in 1999. The reveal is "pivotal" because it forces Nikolas to start growing up, and become a bit more independent. "He has an identity now." Stefan and Laura explained that they hid Nikolas's paternity to protect him from Helena, who likely would have killed him if he were Stefan's son because she hated Stefan. However, by the end of 1999, it was revealed that Helena herself orchestrated the plan to take control of the family fortune away from Nikolas. Changing Nikolas's paternity would take away his right to the Cassadine inheritance which automatically goes to the prince.

=== Relationships ===
In 1996, when asked about Nikolas's potential love life, Christopher said he did know of any plans. Though described by Soap Opera Digest as an "Unwitting Cassa-Nova," Nikolas has trouble trusting others because he has lived such a sheltered life and even dumps his girlfriend, Sarah Webber (Jennifer Sky) when they get too close. According to Christopher, Nikolas is more interested in having a relationship with someone who can teach him something, because he longs for normalcy and is very uncomfortable with the "prince title." Christopher said that for Nikolas, Emily (Amber Tamblyn) has the right personality, but she at the time is too young. On the other hand, Christopher saw Robin Scorpio (Kimberly McCullough) as a good match for Nikolas, but Robin is more interested in his friendship than romance.

== Storylines ==
=== Backstory ===
Nikolas is a Greek Prince and the son of Stavros Cassadine and Laura Spencer. Nikolas faces a constant struggle to define his own identity within the context of the history of the Cassadine and Spencer families. He and his half brother Lucky Spencer often face the crossfire of the long-standing war between them, often at the hands of Nikolas' grandmother, Helena Cassadine.

Nikolas Mikhail Stavrosovich Cassadine was born in Greece on November 5, 1982. However his birth year is revised to 1981 when he enters the canvas as a 15-year-old in July 1996. In 1998, he is seen celebrating his 18th birthday, revising his birth year again to 1980. It is later assumed his birth year is 1977 in comparison to the aging of his younger brother birth year shown as 1979 marriage certificate, on May 5, 2011.

In 1983, Nikolas' presumed-dead mother Laura is revealed to be alive and to have been held captive by Stavros as an act of revenge against Luke Spencer for the events leading to the death of his grandfather Mikkos Cassadine. Laura had been forced to marry Stavros, but is able to return home and reunite with Luke, meanwhile Stavros is presumed dead. In 1996, it is revealed that Laura had been pregnant during that time. The child had been named Nikolas, after Tsar Nicholas II. It is also revealed at this point that when Laura tried to secretly reclaim Nikolas in 1984, his grandmother Helena presumably murdered Laura's mother Lesley Webber. To protect her loved ones, Laura had decided to keep the secret.

=== 1996–2006 ===
Fifteen-year-old Nikolas comes to Port Charles to donate his bone marrow to his sister Lulu Spencer. He and his half-brother Lucky have instant animosity. Nikolas decides to stay and eventually becomes best friends with Emily Quartermaine, who develops romantic feelings for him. Nikolas and Lucky work with Emily and Elizabeth Webber to catch Emily's blackmailer, and it is the first time Nikolas and Lucky start to bond as brothers. They become closer while Nikolas deals with being told that his uncle Stefan Cassadine is instead his father. Laura is determined to foster her relationship with her son, and the two bond when it appears Lucky perished in a fire.

In December 1999, Nikolas learns Stavros really is his father. A few months later, he learns Helena is holding Lucky hostage, as well as having kept Stavros alive by cryogenically freezing him. Helena's plan is thwarted and Stavros falls to his death in a fight with Luke Spencer. Nikolas is then devastated when Laura enters a catatonic state after the murder of her adoptive father Rick Webber. As a result of losing their mother, Lucky, Lulu, and Nikolas become extremely close.

Though Nikolas has romances with both Sarah Webber and Gia Campbell, his greatest love turns out to be Emily. They become close as Emily battles breast cancer. As their feelings grow, Emily becomes torn between Nikolas and her first love Zander Smith. Believing she is dying, Emily marries Zander as her last gift to him. She then enters remission, and eventually Emily and Nikolas slept with one another. Witnessing their adultery starts Zander on a downward spiral, and Emily ends their marriage. Zander tries to kidnap Emily, but is killed by the police. Stefan also interferes, but eventually commits suicide.

When a car accident leaves Nikolas with amnesia, war-widow Mary Bishop takes him in, making it seem like he is dead. Mary lies to Nikolas and tells him he is her late husband Connor, who coincidentally looks just like Nikolas. Emily eventually finds Nikolas, and gently tries to help him regain his memory. Finally remembering Emily, the two reconcile, causing Mary to break down and go on a murder spree. She is eventually shot and killed. Helena returns to stop their relationship, and Nikolas throws her off of cliff, at which point she is presumed dead. Nikolas pleads guilty and the two marry before he is sent to prison. Nikolas' doppelgänger Connor Bishop returns to town alive, and begins romancing Emily as vengeance for Mary, and on the orders of Helena, who turns out to be alive. Connor rapes Emily, who afterwards emotionally retreats from Nikolas due to their similarity. Their marriage is strained, and Nikolas begins an adulterous affair with Courtney Matthews. Emily and Nikolas divorce, and Courtney becomes pregnant. It is unclear if the father is Nikolas or her ex-husband Jasper Jacks. Jax learns Nikolas is the father, and switches the DNA results to make it look like he is.

During the Port Charles encephalitis outbreak, Nikolas and Courtney both become ill, and Courtney gives birth to a boy. On Courtney's deathbed, Jax reveals Nikolas is the father, but Courtney dies before she can tell Nikolas. The real DNA results are discovered by Robin Scorpio, who reveals the truth to Nikolas. Nikolas names his son Spencer.

Emily and Nikolas start to become close again. Nikolas hires a nanny named Colleen McHenry. Colleen turns out to be unstable, and obsessed with Nikolas. She is eventually fired when Emily discovers all of the other fathers she had worked with had been murdered. Nikolas allows Spencer to be in a Christmas pageant, where he is kidnapped by Colleen. Helena takes the baby from Colleen and attempts to christen him as the next Cassadine heir. However, Emily and Nikolas thwart her, and Nikolas has Spencer baptized, naming Emily as his godmother.

=== 2007–2009 ===
Nikolas and Emily continue their romance. They are held hostage at the Metro Court Hotel with several others, and Emily's father Alan Quartermaine dies as a result. After the crisis, the hostage taker, still using the alias James Craig, injects Nikolas with an experimental poison to blackmail him into financing a new life. Robin Scorpio discovers them, and Craig forces her to pretend she is dating Nikolas. Nikolas is forced to end his relationship with Emily, but she learns the truth and works with Robin to save him. Robin and Patrick Drake are able to create the antidote and cure Nikolas. It is revealed that Craig is actually Jerry Jacks. As he recovers, Nikolas begins exhibiting symptoms of uncontrollable violence, anger and blackouts. Nikolas and Emily plan a romantic Black and White Ball, and get engaged. During the ball, Nikolas is devastated when Emily becomes the next victim of the Text Message Killer and is strangled to death. Nikolas begins having hallucinations of Emily, and is eventually diagnosed with a brain tumor. Nikolas befriends nurse Nadine Crowell, who is able to get him to admit he does not want to stop having hallucinations of Emily. When he realizes Diego Alcazar is the killer, the two fight and Diego inadvertently hangs himself during the struggle. Nikolas starts the Emily Bowen Quartermaine Clinic to treat patients without insurance, as a way to honor Emily. Nikolas finally decides to go forward with the surgery, for the sake of his son and knowing it would be what Emily would want.

Nikolas has a brief attraction with Claudia Zacchara, whom he rescues when she washes ashore Spoon Island. His relationship with Nadine also progresses. Nikolas admits to himself though he cares for her, Nadine's feelings for him are much stronger. They attend a benefit at General Hospital, where Nikolas sees a mysterious woman named Rebecca who looks just like Emily. While the benefit is going on, a biotoxin is released and the hospital catches on fire. Nikolas saves Rebecca, though she tells him to stay away. Nadine breaks up with Nikolas when she realizes how attached he is to Rebecca. When Lucky starts to date Rebecca, it bothers both Nikolas and Elizabeth. Nikolas kisses Elizabeth to make them jealous, prompting Elizabeth and Lucky to reconcile. However, Elizabeth finds herself increasingly attracted to Nikolas. Lucky proposes to Elizabeth, and she goes to Wyndemere to see Nikolas. Nikolas and Elizabeth sleep together, but she leaves and accepts Lucky's proposal. Nikolas finds out Rebecca is scamming him and the Quartermaines for Emily's money, and he begins dating her in a plot of revenge. He eventually breaks off the relationship. Rebecca tries to reconcile, but Nikolas tells her he will never be able to care for her. Elizabeth and Nikolas wrestle with their feelings for months, continuing to sleep together. Lucky finds out eventually and confronts them, saying he's done with both of them.

=== 2010–2011 ===
On Valentine's Day, Elizabeth passes out from hypothermia and is found by Lucky. She finds out she is pregnant and the baby could be either Nikolas' or Lucky's. After finding Elizabeth on the hospital roof looking ready to jump, she is sent to Shadybrook. When the paternity test is taken, Lucky is revealed to be the father of Elizabeth's baby. However, Helena tampers with the results, making it seem that Nikolas is the father. During the pregnancy, Elizabeth and Nikolas mend their relationship, with the help of Shirley, a terminal patient they both befriend. In July 2010, Aiden Alexi Nikolossovich Cassadine is born. He is briefly kidnapped by Franco, but Lucky finds him and brings him home. In September, Nikolas invites Brook Lynn Ashton to be his escort for a formal dinner, leading to her officially working as his escort for social commitments. Eventually their relationship turns into a brief romance, but they break up amicably and she leaves town to pursue a music career.

When Jake Spencer is killed by Luke in a hit-and-run accident, Nikolas manages to repair his relationship with Lucky, helping him pull through his grief and setting up a wedding night for Lucky and his new wife Siobhan McKenna. Nikolas participates in a forced intervention meant to coax Luke into rehab for his alleged alcoholism after Jake's death. He briefly agrees to finally enter rehab later on, but flees almost immediately. Lulu believes that she can lure Luke back by managing Luke's casino, The Haunted Star. Nikolas gives Lulu money to buy the casino from Luke's wife Tracy Quartermaine. On the night of Jake's death, Elizabeth finds out that Lucky is Aiden's father but keeps the secret for months. She tells Lucky when he begins a downward spiral dealing with his father. Nikolas refuses to believe it and plans to leave the country with Aiden. He reconsiders and leaves Aiden with Elizabeth and Lucky before leaving town in June 2011.

Nikolas briefly returns in July, when he comes to Cassadine Island, where Lulu is looking for Luke, to speak with Helena. After telling Helena to stay away from Aiden and to never speak of him again, Nikolas tells Lulu how he always felt second to Lucky because everyone was worried about how Lucky felt when he was growing up. He also tells Lulu her search for Luke is just like their mother's belief that Luke was a good man, which eventually destroyed their marriage. He leaves, and Lulu realizes her mistake and returns to Port Charles.

=== 2013–2016, 2019–present ===
Nikolas returns to town in March 2013 when Lulu is abducted and is about to provide information on her whereabouts when he is shot and rendered comatose. Nikolas recovers and reveals that Stavros is alive and behind Lulu's kidnapping. Fortunately Lulu is rescued by her parents, and Stavros and Helena are eliminated. Nikolas pursues Elizabeth again but she rejects him for A. J. Quartermaine. He later partners with Tracy to oust her nephew as CEO, but Elizabeth talks him out of it. As Nikolas welcomes Spencer home, he befriends the pregnant Britt Westbourne who has been rejected by her child's supposed father, Patrick Drake. The duo commiserates over their love lives, and Nikolas invites Britt to move in with him. He later defends her against an angry Patrick, who has discovered that he is not her child's father after all. A romance blossoms between Nikolas and Britt, and they become engaged. Unfortunately, the relationship ends in disaster when Nikolas discovers that Britt's son Ben is actually his nephew, as Britt had stolen Lulu's frozen embryo to entrap Patrick.

Helena resurfaces very much alive, and Nikolas is shocked to learn that Helena's new henchman "Jake Doe" is actually Jason Morgan, Emily's brother who was presumed dead. However, he keeps Jason's identity a secret so he can take over ELQ, the Quartermaine family business, to rebuild Cassadine Industries, as Helena's schemes had fleeced the Cassadines out of their fortune. Nikolas begins an affair with con artist Hayden Barnes, who has been posing as Jake Doe's wife. When Hayden's scheme is exposed during the Nurses' Ball, Nikolas informs Elizabeth that "Jake" is really Jason. Elizabeth chooses to keep the secret, wanting to be with Jason. Hayden overhears this, and blackmails Nikolas into taking her in. With the help of Lucy Coe, Nikolas gains control of ELQ. When Hayden decides to reveal Jake's identity, Nikolas sends a hitman to kill her. Hayden is shot, and ends up in a coma. Hayden wakes up with amnesia. and Nikolas moves her back into Wyndemere, and hires her at ELQ to keep an eye on her. The two continue their romance.

Jason eventually learns his true identity, and breaks up with Elizabeth for covering it up. He also realizes Nikolas knew the truth, sparking a feud between the two. Nikolas and Hayden elope to Las Vegas. However, Nikolas discovers Hayden is actually Rachel Berlin, the daughter of a businessman in prison for a massive Ponzi scheme. Nikolas demands Hayden give him a divorce, but Hayden blackmails him into staying married, revealing she knows Nikolas had her shot. Jason and his wife, Sam, also figure out Nikolas had Hayden shot, and they blackmail him into selling ELQ back to Jason. Nikolas, meanwhile, finds Hayden in possession of diamonds that belonged to her father, which she stole before the IRS could seize. He tries to use the diamonds to make Hayden miserable enough to ask for a divorce.

Nikolas pawns one of Hayden's diamonds to make a donation to the Nurses' Ball. Hayden is furious, and decides to turn Nikolas in at the Nurses' Ball, but he stalls her. He goes home with the diamonds and, hours later, is on the cliffs beneath Wyndemere, having apparently fallen out of the window. His body is never recovered, and he is presumed dead. Jason is arrested for his murder, but goes on the run and figures out Nikolas faked his death and tried to frame Hayden. Nikolas, meanwhile, heads to London and bumps into Ava Jerome. Nikolas and Ava are briefly kidnapped, but escape and head to Cassadine Island. Jason and Sam find him there, trying to track down Nikolas to clear Jason's name. The group then meets the mysterious Theo Hart, who claims to be a fisherman taking shelter on the island because of the storm. As the storm clears, Theo leaves and Nikolas is reunited with Laura and Lulu, who have come to the island looking for him after Spencer revealed that Nikolas is alive. As the group prepares to leave the island, Theo returns wielding a gun and reveals himself to be Nikolas' bastard uncle Valentin Cassadine. Valentin forces Nikolas to sign over the Cassadine estate to him, then proceeds to shoot Nikolas, causing him to stumble off the balcony into the waters below, leaving him presumed dead. In late 2019, Nikolas returns to Port Charles.

== Reception ==
Viewers and critics immediately loved the Nikolas character and his introduction. Christopher was praised for the "depth and sensitivity" he brought to the role of Nikolas and Soap Opera Magazine hailed Christopher as "the find of the summer." Stephen Nichols said Christopher's inexperience worked in his favor as it brought a "childlike quality" to the character. Soap Opera Digest awarded Christopher as the "Rookie of the Year" in 1996 and said Christopher joined the cast with a "bang." Christopher was also nominated for the Soap Opera Digest Awards in the "Outstanding Newcomer" category which he won. Another article described Christopher as the "Soap Opera Discovery of 1996." Christopher's portrayal was said to have rivaled that of his onscreen mother's portrayal of Laura since she joined the cast in 1996. In 1997, Soap Opera Magazine listed Christopher as one of the 60 Most Beautiful People in daytime. Christopher's portrayal of Nikolas after his shooting in front of Luke's "masterfully portrayed." In 1999, TV Guide's Michael Logan criticized the writers for never investing in a "worthy" romance for Nikolas.

In 2023, Charlie Mason from Soaps She Knows placed Nikolas 28th on his ranked list of General Hospital’s 40+ Greatest Characters of All Time, commenting that "No one ever need wonder what an individual would be like if they possessed in equal measure both light (thanks to mom Laura Collins) and dark (courtesy of father Stavros); they need only meet the Cassadines' dark prince." Mason also put Huss' portrayals of Nikolas on his list of the best soap opera temporary recasts, commenting that "General Hospital fans sat up and took notice in 2021 when Marcus Coloma was out sick and replaced as Nikolas Cassadine. They missed the character's regular portrayer, of course, but couldn't help but notice that that Huss guy… he had something, an intensity, maybe, a gravitas that made him an unusually good sub. So although it was a bummer when, in 2023, Coloma bowed out at the end of Nikolas' storyline, it was also a treat to see Huss dive into those especially explosive final episodes."
