= Kathleen Gati =

Canadian actress

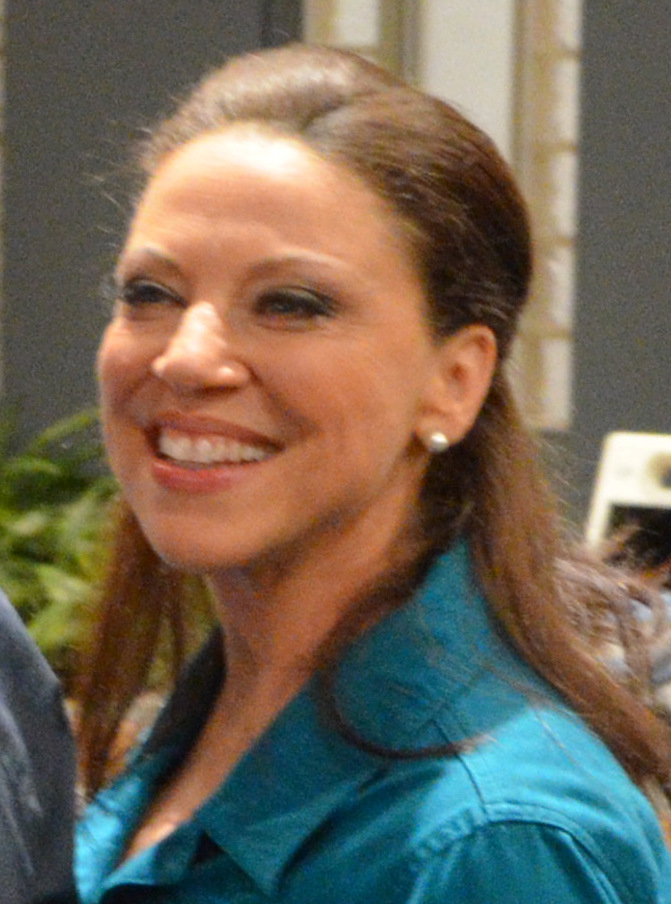
- Gati in 2014
- Born: 13 August 1957 (age 69); Montreal, Quebec, Canada
- Occupation: Actress
- Years active: 1981–present
- Spouse: Michael Browers (m. 2012)
- Website: www.kathleengati.com

Kathleen Gati (born 13 August 1957) is a US-based Canadian actress. She is known for portraying Liesl Obrecht on the ABC daytime soap opera General Hospital. Gati appeared on the television series Leverage in 2009.

== Career ==
Gati moved to New York at age 20 and began acting in off-Broadway productions and the ABC daytime soap opera All My Children from 1989 to 1990. In the early 1990s, she moved to Hungary for a lead film role (Sose halunk meg) and stayed there for five years.

Gati has appeared in a number of movies, including Sunshine (1999), Igby Goes Down (2002), Meet the Fockers (2004), and The Future (2011). On television, she has had guest starring roles on The Practice, NYPD Blue, ER, Cold Case, Desperate Housewives, NCIS, The Mentalist, and Arrow. Gati also had the recurring role as Russian First Lady Anya Suvarov on the Fox series 24 from 2006 to 2007.

In 2012, Gati joined the cast of ABC daytime soap opera General Hospital playing the villainous Dr. Liesl Obrecht. Three years later, she had a recurring role in the BET drama series Being Mary Jane, playing network executive Shohreh Broomand, and during 2015–16, had a starring role in the web series Fear the Walking Dead: Flight 462.

In 2015, Gati portrayed Valentina Winterthorne on the soap opera web series Winterthorne. The following year, she was nominated for an Indie Series Award for Best Guest Actress in a Drama, and a Daytime Emmy Award for Outstanding Actress in a Digital Daytime Drama Series for the role.

== Filmography ==
=== Film ===
Year	Title	Role	Notes
1981	Ms. 45	Extra	
1985	Heaven Help Us	Catholic School Girl	Uncredited
1987	Forever, Lulu	Lisa	
1988	Mr. Universe		
1989	Creating Rem Lezar	Ashlee's Mother	Straight-to-video
1989	Fear, Anxiety & Depression		
1990	Frankenhooker	Corner Hooker #1	
1992	Goldberg variácók	Kati - the American Friend	
1993	Sose halunk meg	Nusi	
1993	Senkiföldje	Ági	
1995	A színésznő és a halál	Kathleen Gati	Documentary about her taking care of her dying mother
1995	Esti Kornél csodálatos utazása	Bankárné	
1995	The Zone	CIA Technician	
1997	Franciska vasárnapjai	Moniter Sári	
1999	The Diary of the Hurdy-Gurdy Man	Gabriel's Wife	
1999	The Fall	Justine	
1999	Sunshine	Josefa Sonnenschein	
1999	Jakob the Liar	Hooker	
2001	The Hollywood Sign	Deb	
2002	Zig Zag	Doctor	
2002	Man of the Year	Ella	
2002	Igby Goes Down	Ida	
2003	The Rain Has Forgotten Us	Maggie	Short film
2004	Meet the Fockers	Venka - Immigrant Woman	
2005	Induction	Medical Specialist Daniel	Short film
2005	Erosion	Ms. Spelling	
2006	The Heart Specialist	Radiology Technician	
2006	The Elder Son	Fedya's Wife	
2007	Trade	Irina	
2007	Az emigráns	Sarah	
2007	Chekhov and Maria	Olga (voice)	
2008	Out Any Window	Neighbor	Short film
2008	Villa Nova	Mom	Short film
2008	The House Bunny	Boutique Manager	
2008	Strangers	Miss Stone	
2010	The Space Between	Natalia	
2011	The Future	Dr. Straus	
2011	Little Birds	Sally Heron	
2011	Retrace	Katherine	
2011	Transformers: Dark of the Moon	Russian Female Bartender	
2011	The Last Mile	Volunteer	Short film
2013	The Advocate	Judge Biggs	
2013	Thunder and the House of Magic	Carla (voice)	Credited as Kathleen Browers
2021	American Dream	Yulia Novenchenko	

=== Television ===
Year	Title	Role	Notes
1989–1990	All My Children	Taffy Winslow	Recurring role
1994	A Change of Place	Mimi	TV film
1994–95	Patika	Christine	12 episodes
1996	The Prophet: Kahlil Gibran	Teacher	TV film
1998	The Practice	Uniformed Officer	Episode: "Reasons to Believe"
1998	Brother's Keeper	Katya	Episode: "Cleaning Lessons"
1999	Da Vinci's Inquest	Gwen Marquetti	Episode: "A Cinderella Story: Part 1"
2000	Arrest & Trial	Joy Hooker	Episode: "T.J. Hooker"
2000	Resurrection Blvd.	Ivana	Episode: "Los Manos de Piedra"
2001	When Billie Beat Bobby	Debbie the Hairdresser	TV film
2001	The Agency	American/Russian Woman	Episode: "In Our Own Backyard"
2002	NYPD Blue	Eileen Healey	Episode: "Low Blow"
2003	Ghost Dog: A Detective Tail	Madame Wanda	TV film
2003	The Agency	Polina Kachan	Episode: "Mi Cena con Andrei"
2003	Carnivàle	Emma Templeton	Episode: "After the Ball Is Over"
2003	Cold Case	Irene Jablonski	Episode: "Fly Away"
2004	ER	Stacy Coleman	Episode: "Intern's Guide to the Galaxy"
2006	Strong Medicine	Kathy Mided	Episode: "Baby BOOM!"
2006	Jimmy Kimmel Live!	Ivana Trump	Episode: "4.182"
2006	Commander in Chief	Lucinda Wallace	Episode: "State of the Unions"
2006	Bones	Mrs. Crane	Episode: "The Boy in the Shroud"
2006	Desperate Housewives	Maya	Episode: "Bang"
2006–07	Me, Eloise	Mrs. Thornton (voice)	Recurring role (5 episodes)
2006–07	24	Anya Suvarov	Recurring role (6 episodes)
2007	Ghost Whisperer	Elena's Mother	Episode: "The Prophet"
2008	NCIS	Natasha Lenkov	Episode: "Judgment Day: Part 2"
2008	Kamen Rider: Dragon Knight	Kit's Foster Mother	Episode: "Search for the Dragon"
2009	The Mentalist	Mariska Kopecki / Vanna Clooney	Episode: "Red John's Friends"
2009	Leverage	Irina Larenko	Episode: "The Stork Job"
2010	The Young and the Restless	Aunt Juliette	1 episode
2010	Covert Affairs	Fatima, the Turk	Episode: "No Quarter"
2010	Lie to Me	Nurse	Episode: "Double Blind"
2011	Fairly Legal	Renata	Episode: "Bridges"
2011	Jon Benjamin Has a Van	Woman in Window	Episode: "Little Little Italy"
2011	Borderline Murder	Irena	TV film
2011	Alphas	Zahra Pirzad	Recurring role (4 episodes)
2012	Star Wars: The Clone Wars	Nightsister / Old Daka (voice)	Episode: "Massacre"
2012	Weeds	Olga	Episode: "It's Time, Part 1"
2012; 2017–2018	Arrow	Raisa	6 episodes
2012–present	General Hospital	Dr. Liesl Obrecht	Recurring role
2012	The Unknown	Anne Smith	Episode: "Relapse"
2015	Winterthorne	Valentina Winterthorne	Web series
2015	The Fosters	Bus Driver	Episode: "Daughters"

=== Videogames ===
Year	Title	Role
2004	World of Warcraft	
2008	Turning Point: Fall of Liberty	
2016	World of Warcraft: Legion	
2017	Wolfenstein II: The New Colossus	Bette Hoskins, Gizela Balog, Gabriella Benning

== Awards and nominations ==
- Won the Film Critics Award at the Hungarian Film Critics Awards in 1993 for Best Supporting Actress for Goldberg variácók (1992)
- Won the Best Actress Award at the Los Angeles Hungarian Film Festival in 2011 for Visszatérés-Retrace (2011)
- Won the Best Documentary award at the Hungarian Film Week in 1995 for A Színésznõ és a halál (1995) shared with Gábor Dettre
- Nominated for a Daytime Emmy Award for Outstanding Actress in a Digital Daytime Drama Series for Winterthorne (2016).
- Nominated for an Indie Series Award for Best Guest Actress in a Drama for Winterthorne (2016)

== Personal life ==
Gati is the daughter of Laszlo and Agnes Gati; Hungarian immigrants to Canada, a symphony conductor and an opera singer. She married Michael Browers on 7 April 2012.
