= Nelle Benson =

Fictional character from General Hospital

- General Hospital character
- Chloe Lanier as Nelle Benson
- Portrayed by: Chloe Lanier (2016–2022); Willa Rose (2020)
- Duration: 2016–2020; 2022
- First appearance: August 8, 2016
- Last appearance: September 6, 2022
- Created by: Shelly Altman and Jean Passanante
- Introduced by: Frank Valentini
In-universe information
- Other names: Janelle Benson; Nelle Corinthos; Nelle Hayes; Nelle Benson-Jerome
- Occupation: Assistant at Jerome Gallery; Executive assistant (at Crimson); Nanny; Teacher
- Father: Silas Clay
- Mother: Nina Reeves
- Adoptive father: Frank Benson
- Sisters: Willow Tait
- Half-sisters: Carly Corinthos (adoptive); Kiki Jerome
- Spouse: Michael Corinthos (2018); David Henry "Shiloh" Archer (2019); Julian Jerome (2020)
- Children: Wiley Cooper-Jones
- Stepchildren: Sam McCall; Lucas Jones; Leo Falconeri
- Grandchildren: Danny Morgan (step); Lila McCall (step); Emily Cain (step)
- Grandparents: Madeline Reeves
- Aunts and uncles: Stephen Clay; Nathan West (adoptive)
- Nieces and nephews: Jonah Corinthos; Amelia Corinthos; Michael Corinthos (adoptive); Morgan Corinthos (adoptive); Josslyn Jacks (adoptive); Donna Corinthos (adoptive)
- First cousins: Rafe Kovich, Jr.; James West (adoptive)
- Other relatives: Liesl Obrecht; Britt Westbourne; Nathan West; James West

Nelle Benson is a fictional character from General Hospital, an American soap opera on the ABC network. Created by Shelly Altman and Jean Passanante, and introduced by executive producer Frank Valentini, Nelle is portrayed by actress Chloe Lanier, who made her first appearance on August 8, 2016.

== Development ==
=== Creation and casting ===
General Hospital was planning to cast another actress to portray the role of Nelle Hayes, as Lanier was involved with another series, Kingdom at that time, but Laura Wright and Frank Valentini were adamant that Lanier was right for the role, so the storyline was put on hold until the actress became available. Lanier revealed to Soap Opera Digest that "Frank Valentini had called her personally and convinced her to do it. Which she's very happy that he did, because they were able to work out a deal, so she could do other projects on her time off which she's thankful for." On July 12, 2016, Soaps In Depth officially announced that actress Lanier, who previously portrayed the role of the Patricia Spencer for the 52nd anniversary, would be returning to the serial in the newly created role of Nelle. The information about her character was a mystery, as the serial stayed tight-lipped about the character and her connection to Port Charles. About Nelle's future, Lanier says "It will definitely take more than easy facts & logic to shift the dynamic, because Nelle grew up in a cult, being brainwashed by her father from an early age." In June 2018, it was announced that Lanier had opted to not renew her deal with the serial, and would exit the role. Lanier departed on August 7, 2018. Lanier briefly reprised the role for a "short-term stint," from October 12 to 15, 2018. On November 1, 2018, it was reported that Lanier will be making more appearances on the show. Lanier appeared on November 8, 2018. She also made an appearance on December 26, 2018. In May of the following year, Soaps.com announced that Lanier would reprise the role, beginning June 13. Willa Rose portrayed a young Nelle in flashback scenes for the April 8, 2020, episode. Lanier later exited the role and last appeared on September 1, 2020. Lanier then made a brief reappearance on September 6, 2022.

=== Characterization ===
A casting call was released for a General Hospital female character in her early 20s who is described as being "charismatic, dynamic and fiery." Any ethnicity actress was asked to audition for the role. According to Lanier, "As much as her character mostly has it out for Carly, Nelle has a good heart, and isn't entirely vicious and evil."

=== Introduction ===
Nelle was introduced as a school teacher whose kidney was sold on the black market in order to save her niece, Josslyn's life. There were speculations that she would be related to Pat Spencer since she previously played the younger version of her, but in March 2017, it was revealed that she is the daughter of Frank Benson and the adopted half-sister of Carly Corinthos.

== Storylines ==
Janelle Benson, who goes by Nelle, arrives in Port Charles in August 2016 looking for Carly Corinthos (Wright). She meets her at the Corinthos' house, Greystone Manor, during the birthday party of Bobbie Spencer (Jacklyn Zeman), and informs her about being her daughter, Josslyn's (Eden McCoy) kidney donor. When Carly asks for proof, she becomes upset and tells them she's not here for money. Sonny and Jax don't believe her, and inform her about Carly being conned for money before. Nelle reacts badly and leaves. Michael goes after her and convinces her to stay, she meets Joss when she approaches her, and they briefly bond after Nelle assists her with an app. After Joss leaves, Michael and Nelle head back to Corinthos house, agreeing to go to the hospital for the tests and is confirmed to be the donor. Joss learns the truth about Nelle being the one who saved her life and thanks her with a hug. Carly and Joss ask her to stay in Port Charles so they can get to know her. She starts working for Carly as her stepdaughter, Avery Corinthos' nanny, after the previous nanny gets fired for stealing Carly's earrings. Nelle loses her job after Bobbie offers to look after Avery. So Carly offers her a job of a personal assistant at the Metro Court Hotel which she accepts. In November 2016, she drugs Sonny and leads him to believe he had sex with her, as part of her revenge plot against Carly. Nelle struggles with her guilt, however, but continues to conspire against Carly at Sonny's expense.

In early 2017, Michael convinces Nelle to bury the hatred and focus on her future; she listens to him, and decides to stop scheming so she and Michael can be together and she can finally be happy. She deletes the recording after Michael leaves, but when she goes to Carly's office to destroy the package that contained the recording, Bobbie confronts her about her nasty doings. She goes to see Michael so she can tell him the truth, but they got interrupted, so when they go to her apartment for privacy they find his parents there who expose Nelle. When Michael asks for the truth, Nelle admits everything, but blames Carly for it. She reveals being Frank Benson's daughter, and how Carly called her father for her kidney when her daughter got sick when she never cared about them. Carly denies it and says she thought it was Jake Webber's kidney which Nelle refuses to believe. Sonny and Michael try to explain to Nelle that her own father screwed her over and not Carly, but she doesn't listen to them. After Carly and Sonny leave, Michael stays back and gives Nelle an ear full before leaving.

Nelle starts packing her things, so she can move out from the apartment given to her by Carly. That's when Joss shows up with the concert tickets, but Nelle blows her off and goes for a drink at The Floating Rib where she runs into Michael who tells her he will never forgive her for hurting his parents. Jax then meets her somewhere, and Nelle learns through him that her father used her after he shows her proof and she realizes everything. She tries to make things right by confessing to Sonny that they didn't sleep together, and later on confesses to Carly as well, but to no avail. After hearing what she has to say, Carly kicks her out of her house. Since she no longer had a job, Nina Reeves (Michelle Stafford) hires her as a full-time nanny for Charlotte Cassadine (Scarlett Fernandez).

When Jasper gets arrested for buying Nelle's kidney illegally, she goes to the station and makes a statement about not wanting to press charges, so the charges get dropped for which Jasper thanks her. When Jasper leaves, Carly thanks Nelle, but then asks her to stay away from her family especially Michael. She asks Carly "when will it ever be enough for you to forgive me?" To which Carly replies it doesn't change what she did and she won't forgive her. Afterwards, Michael arrives at the station and misjudges Nelle, offering her a compensation if she doesn't press charges, oblivious that she saved Jax. When he learns the truth, he meets her at the docks while she's waiting for a boat to Wyndemere and apologizes to her. Nina presses her into spying on her husband, Valentin who she suspects is keeping secrets from her.

In June 2017, Nina hires Nelle to work as her executive assistant at Crimson; despite this, Nelle is later fired by Nina. When Michaels breaks up with Nelle, she admits she is pregnant with his baby. Nelle is later hired by Ava Jerome (Maura West) to work at the Jerome Gallery. Angered by her own belief that it was Carly's doing that led to her split from Michael, Nelle begins to manipulate Carly, in the hopes of making her lose her mind, by making anonymous calls near the site where Morgan Corinthos (Bryan Craig) died.

During her baby shower, Nelle fell down a flight of stairs at the Quartermaine Mansion after getting into an argument with Carly, similar to the situation that happened to Carly years ago, when she lost her child on the same stairs.

In late 2018, she was visited by Charlotte's soon-to-be great-aunt Liesl Obrecht (Kathleen Gati) in prison after Nelle's male counterpart Peter August (Wes Ramsey) became the new owner of The Invader tabloid. In late 2019, when Brad visited her in Pentonville prison, she requested him to let her be a part of her son's life once she's out of prison after she met convicted serial killer Ryan Chamberlain (Jon Lindstrom). The following year, Nelle is given an early release from Pentonville, and reveals herself as the widow of David Henry "Shiloh" Archer, who bore a striking resemblance to the late Nathan West (Ryan Paevey). With her status as Shiloh's widow, she uses her proxy to sell her shares of ELQ to Valentin Cassadine (James Patrick Stuart) and begins to assert herself as Wiley's mother, much to the dismay and objection of the residents of Port Charles. When she hears of Brad and Lucas' decision to leave Port Charles with Wiley, she attempts to kidnap him, however, she is stopped by Michael and Chase. It is hinted that Nelle is the long-lost daughter of Nina (Cynthia Watros), having possession of the baby rattle and half-heart necklace that Nina possesses, but has yet to be confirmed as of August 2020. In May 2020, Nelle marries Julian Jerome (William deVry). In August, after kidnapping Wiley and going on the run, Michael tracked them down to a cabin, but Nelle took off into the woods. Following a showdown with Carly, Nelle fell off a cliff. Carly tried to save her, but it was too late.

In 2022, on the second death anniversary of her death, Nelle appeared in Nina and Willow's dreams.

== Reception ==
In 2023, Charlie Mason from Soaps She Knows placed Nelle at #40 on his ranked list of General Hospital’s 40+ Greatest Characters of All Time, commenting "“Ugh,” we can just hear you saying. “Why is she on this list?” Frankly, it's because the mere mention of the supervixen's name can make you say, “Ugh.” Troublemakers who leave that lasting an impression are hard to come by — and harder to forget!"
