= Donnell Turner =

American actor (born 1973)

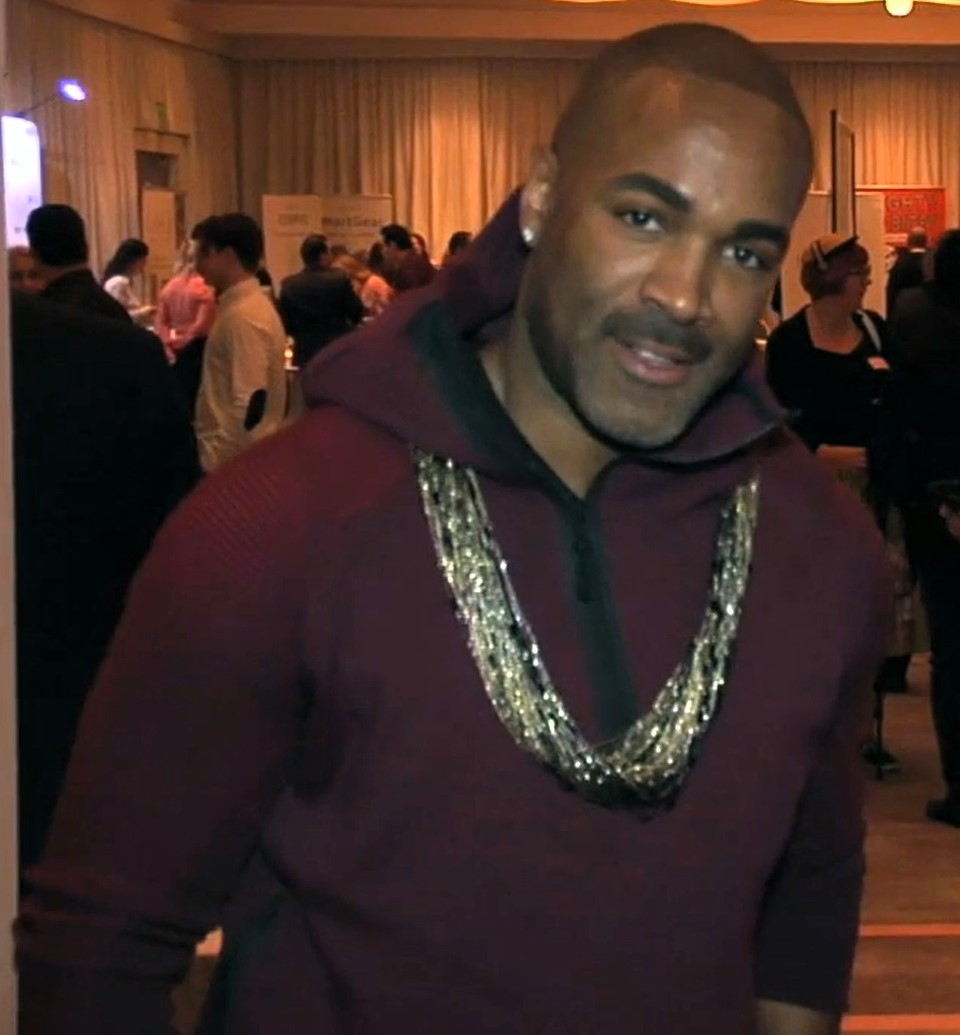
- Turner in 2017
- Born: Donnell Lamont Turner; January 8, 1973 (age 53); Tacoma, Washington, U.S.
- Occupations: Actor; model
- Years active: 2004–present
- Known for: General Hospital
- Height: 6 ft 2 in (1.88 m)
- Children: 1

Donnell Lamont Turner (born January 8, 1973) is an American actor best known for his portrayal of Curtis Ashford on the ABC daytime soap opera, General Hospital.

== Personal life ==
Turner was born on January 8, 1973, in Tacoma, Washington. He is the son of Milton Turner (1949–2019) and Lorraine Sylvester (1951–2021). His older brother, Milton Jr. (Ejay) is a member of the 1990s Contemporary R&B group, DRS. His family moved to Chicago when Turner was still a baby. As a child, Turner relocated to Redding, California, with his mother and brother, where they were the only African American family in the neighborhood.

Turner has one daughter, Whitney. Turner fell in love with performing as a child participating in church plays. In high school, he played basketball and played trumpet in band. Turner has a cat, Josephine "Josie" Baker, named after the eponymous late singer. Turner has studied martial arts since the age of 10.5 and explained that it helped him in his acting career. He also enjoys knife combat, nunchaku, yoga, kickboxing, and firearms training.

== Career ==
Turner briefly played semi-pro basketball but quit to act full-time. In 2001, Turner moved to Los Angeles and eventually started modeling and commercial work for several major brands including Nike, Pepsi, Coca-Cola, Bud Light, Coors, Mercedes-Benz, Disney and AT&T. As of 2016, he has appeared in over 100 commercials. Turner also found work as a production assistant and stunt work for shows like ER where he doubled for Eriq La Salle and Criminal Minds where he doubled for Shemar Moore. Turner later doubled for Jesse L. Martin in the musical, Rent. Turner also found work as a background artist. In 2010, Turner appeared on Days of Our Lives as Dr. Aiden Williams opposite Kristian Alfonso. Turner who grew up watching General Hospital started writing to casting director Mark Teschner in the 1990s and first auditioned for the series in 2014. On October 29, 2015, he signed on to portray Curtis Ashford.

== Charitable works ==
Turner also works as a motivational speaker and speaks with college and high school students, as well as religious and professional association audiences. Turner also has a mentoring program known as the "Turnround Project." On April 2, 2016, Turner was the celebrity guest speaker at the Autism Speaks Walk Now event.

== Filmography ==
Year	Title	Role	Notes
2004	Wednesday Afternoon	Backup Police Officer	Short
2006	Diamond Real Estate	Keion Richards	Video short
2006–07	Criminal Minds	Apartment super/ Man on the street #1	2 episodes
2007	Grave Situations	Jerry	
2008	Alternative	Marcus	Short
2009	A Fish Needs a Bicycle	Eric	Short
2009–10	Days of Our Lives	Dr. Aiden Williams	Recurring; 3 episodes
2010	A Worthy Gentleman	Maurice	
2011	The Boulevard	Stan Hodek	TV movie
2012	2 Broke Girls	Officer James	Episode: "And Martha Stewart have a Ball"; Parts 1 and 2
2012	Baby Daddy	Guy	Episode: "Married to the Job"
2012	Parks and Recreation	Louis	Episode: "Halloween Surprise"
2012	90210	Waiter	Episode: "Into the Wild"
2013	CSI: Crime Scene Investigation	Bouncer	1 episode
2013	Anger Management	Handsome man	1 episode
2013	Save Me	Benicio	1 episode
2013	Teen Wolf	Paramedic	1 episode
2013	Dexter	Off Duty Cop	1 episode
2013	Social Nightmare	Officer Elliot	TV movie
2013	Baseball's Last Hero: 21 Clemente Stories	Dock Ellis	Independent film
2013	The Mindy Project	Male cop	1 episode
2013	Revenge	Investor	1 episode
2014	Love That Girl!	Calvin B. Lyons	1 episode
2014	Friends with Better Lives	Cop #2	1 episode
2014	Bad Judge	Fireman	1 episode
2014	How to Get Away with Murder	Handsome man	1 episode
2014	Suffocated	Max	Short
2015	The Young and the Restless	Doctor	2 episodes
2015	Stitchers	Dean Jerome Hardwyck	1 episode
2015	Rizzoli & Isles	Firefighter	1 episode
2015	Kevin from Work	Coach	1 episode
2015 - Current	General Hospital	Curtis Ashford	Contract role; November 30, 2015–present
2016	Time In Between	Wreck	Film
2016	A Million Happy Now	Mr. Handsome	Film
2016	The Choir Director	Detective McGraw	Film
