= List of General Hospital characters introduced in the 2010s =

General Hospital is the longest-running American television serial drama, airing on ABC since April 1, 1963. Created by Frank and Doris Hursley, it was originally set in a general hospital (hence the title) in an unnamed fictional city. In the 1970s, the city was named Port Charles, New York. This is a list of notable characters who significantly impacted storylines and began their run between 2010 and 2019.

== Shiloh Archer ==
Shiloh Archer, portrayed by Coby Ryan McLaughlin, was originally introduced as Hank, a man from Drew Cain's (Billy Miller) past, on December 27, 2018. In September of the following year, McLaughlin announced his exit from the role; he made his last appearance on September 26, 2019.

Shiloh arrives in Port Charles looking for Drew Cain (Miller), claiming Drew saved his life in Afghanistan, and wants to repay his debt to him.

== Curtis Ashford ==
Curtis Ashford
- General Hospital character
- Portrayed by: Donnell Turner
- Duration: 2015–present
- First appearance: November 30, 2015
- Created by: Jean Passanante and Shelly Altman
- Introduced by: Frank Valentini
In-universe information
- Other names: Curtis Byron Ashford; Curtis Gooden; Marc Ross
- Occupation: Private investigator; DEA agent
- Father: Marshall Ashford
- Mother: Irene Ashford
- Brothers: Tommy Ashford
- Spouse: Jordan Ashford (2018–2022); Portia Robinson (2023–present)
- Children: Trina Robinson; Desmond Ashford
- Aunts: Stella Henry
- Nephews: TJ Ashford (legal)

Curtis Ashford, portrayed by Donnell Turner, was introduced as a private investigator hired by Hayden Barnes (Rebecca Budig). Turner's casting was announced on November 19.

=== Storylines ===
Curtis is introduced as a friend of Shawn Butler (Sean Blakemore) whom Hayden Barnes (Rebecca Budig) hires to uncover the truth behind her shooting. Curtis discovers that Hayden's boyfriend, Nikolas Cassadine (Tyler Christopher), was actually responsible for the shooting that left Hayden comatose. Curtis is soon revealed to be the brother-in-law of Police Commissioner Jordan Ashford (Vinessa Antoine) and uncle of her son, TJ (Tequan Richmond). Jordan is not happy to see Curtis, and demands that he leave town. Curtis becomes attracted to Valerie Spencer (Brytni Sarpy), an officer in training. Jordan tries to warn Valerie away from Curtis. Curtis reveals that he had a cocaine addiction, and Jordan later states that it led to him losing his job as a DEA agent. Curtis starts dating Valerie, and starts getting to know TJ. Curtis reveals that he told his brother, Tommy, that TJ was actually Shawn's son. Curtis admits to Jordan that he regrets what he did, but overhears, and is furious with his mother for lying to him. He also talks to Curtis, who convinces TJ to give Jordan another chance. Curtis tries to convince Jordan to give him a job as an officer, saying that he is changed, but Jordan has a hard time trusting him. Curtis is hired by Julian Jerome (William deVry) to find who planted a bomb in his car, which ended up killing Morgan Corinthos (Bryan Craig). Curtis suspects Sonny Corinthos (Maurice Benard), Morgan's father and Julian's rival. When Curtis goes behind Valerie's back to get evidence, Valerie breaks up with him. However, Curtis later realizes someone else is involved. When he starts tracking down his lead, Julian abruptly fires him. Curtis is left suspicious, and continues to investigate. He later teams up with Jason (Billy Miller) and Sam Morgan (Kelly Monaco) to find Morgan's killer. They found out that it was Julian's sister Olivia Jerome (Tonja Walker) that did it and framed Sonny in covering her tracks as well as kidnapping Sonny's longtime best friend Robin Scorpio-Drake (Kimberly McCullough); the information confirmed Curtis, Jason and Sam's story.

== Jordan Ashford ==
Jordan Ashford
- General Hospital character
- Portrayed by: Vinessa Antoine (2014–2018); Briana Nicole Henry (2018–2021); Tiffany Daniels (2021); Tanisha Harper (2022–present)
- Duration: 2014–present
- First appearance: March 17, 2014
- Created by: Ron Carlivati
- Introduced by: Frank Valentini
In-universe information
- Occupation: DEA agent; Commissioner of the Port Charles Police Department (2015–2021, 2022–2024); Deputy mayor (2024–present)
- Siblings: Monet Mitchell
- Spouse: Tommy Ashford (pre–2011); Curtis Ashford (2018–2022)
- Children: TJ Ashford

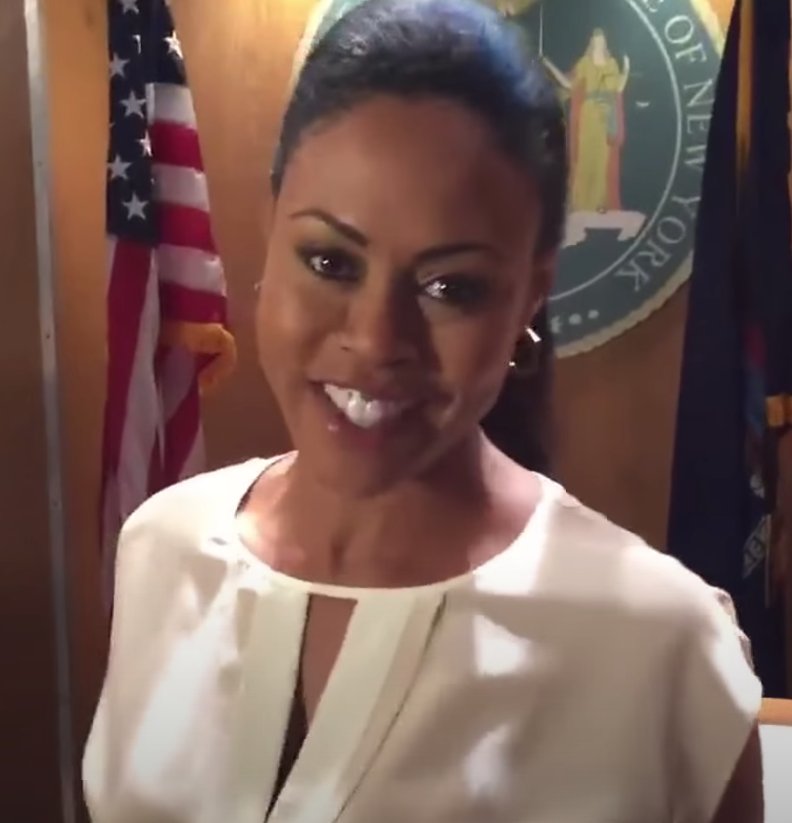
Vinessa Antoine originated the role of Jordan from March 2014 to September 2018

Jordan Ashford, portrayed by Vinessa Antoine, was introduced on March 17, 2014, as the estranged mother of TJ Ashford (Tequan Richmond). On August 10, 2018, it was announced that Briana Nicole Henry had been cast in the role of Jordan, following Antoine's casting in the Canadian pilot series, Diggstown. Antoine last aired on September 7, 2018. Henry made her debut on September 13, 2018. In January 2021, Tiffany Daniels was temporarily cast in the role, following Henry's COVID-19 diagnosis; at press time, Henry had already resumed filming in the role. Brytni Sarpy—who would later be cast as Valerie Spencer—screen tested for the role of Jordan. On September 14, 2021, Henry announced that she had vacated the role with the character of Jordan being written out.

In February 2022, Deadline Hollywood announced Tanisha Harper had been cast in the role; she made her first appearance on March 2.

=== Storylines ===
Jordan comes to Port Charles upon learning that TJ had found himself caught in a mob war between Sonny Corinthos (Maurice Benard) and Julian Jerome (William deVry). While TJ and his guardian, Shawn Butler (Sean Blakemore), assured Jordan that TJ was safe from Julian, Jordan still pressured her son to leave Port Charles with her. When TJ refused, Jordan decided to remain in Port Charles with her son and took a job working for the Jerome Organization at an art gallery they owned. Shawn warned Jordan to stay away from the Jeromes and when she refused, he threatened to tell TJ that the reason he had been sent to Port Charles in the first place was that she was serving a two-year prison sentence for dealing drugs. While Jordan attempted to convince Shawn that she had changed, she secretly offered to distribute drugs for Julian that he was running through town. Jordan is eventually arrested as part of a sting operation organized by the Port Charles Police Department, at which time she reveals she is working undercover with the DEA to bring down the Jerome Organization. Jordan confides in Anna Devane of her DEA status and Anna agrees to work with her to reveal the identity of Julian Jerome's boss.

In 2014, it is revealed that Shawn and Jordan had an affair before TJ was born and that when Tommy found a letter about the DNA test proving that Shawn, not Tommy, was TJ's father, confirming Shawn and Jordan's affair, he became so enraged that he attacked Shawn. Tommy pulled a gun but before he could kill Shawn, Shawn killed him first.

In May 2015, Jordan confirmed that Shawn, not Tommy, is in fact TJ's father. In the middle of 2015, Jordan replaces Kyle Sloane as police commissioner. In early 2016, Jordan begins dating Andre Maddox (Anthony Montgomery). Her ex-brother-in-law, Curtis Ashford (Donnell Turner), comes to town. Curtis later goes on a date with officer Valerie Spencer (Brytni Sarpy) which Jordan interrupts to warn Valerie away from him. After Jordan exposes it, Curtis confides in Valerie that he had previously struggled with a cocaine addiction during his time working for the DEA.

== Hayden Barnes ==
Hayden Barnes
- General Hospital character
- Portrayed by: Rebecca Budig
- Duration: 2015–2017; 2019
- First appearance: March 20, 2015
- Last appearance: November 27, 2019
- Created by: Ron Carlivati
- Introduced by: Frank Valentini
In-universe information
- Other names: Rachel Berlin; Rosalie Martinez (2015); Hayden Cassadine (2016); Madison Ford (2017–2019)
- Occupation: CFO of Crimson magazine Businesswoman
- Family: Hardy; Webber
- Father: Jeff Webber
- Mother: Naomi Dreyfus
- Stepfather: Raymond Berlin
- Half-brothers: Steven Webber
- Half-sisters: Sarah Webber; Elizabeth Webber
- Spouse: Jared Preston Jr. (backstory); Nikolas Cassadine (2016–19)
- Children: Violet Finn
- Grandfathers: Steve Hardy
- Grandmothers: Helene Webber
- Uncles: Rick Webber; Tom Hardy (adoptive)
- Aunts: Terri Arnett
- Nephews: Cameron Webber; Jake Webber; Aiden Spencer
- First cousins: Laura Spencer (adoptive); Rick Webber, Jr. (adoptive); Tommy Hardy (adoptive)
- Other relatives: Audrey Hardy

Hayden Barnes, portrayed by Daytime Emmy nominated actress and All My Children alumna Budig, was introduced on March 20, 2015.

=== Casting ===
Budig's casting was announced on Twitter by executive producer Frank Valentini and head writer Ron Carlivati on February 10, 2015. Carlivati described the character as "a real spitfire" and Valentini said it was "Killer role." In an interview with Michael Logan for TV Insider, the character's name was officially revealed to be Hayden Barnes. Budig described the character as "ballsy and very direct" similar to her former All My Children character, Greenlee Smythe. However, Budig continued, "this one is much more out there then Greenlee." Budig admitted that she was even surprised by some of Hayden's actions. The actress expected fans backlash considering she had caused trouble for popular heroine Elizabeth Webber (Rebecca Herbst). Logan described Hayden as a "maneater." Budig later left the series on May 19, 2015, after her character went into a coma. Budig reprised the role on August 3, 2015. In June 2017, it was announced that Budig was let go from the series, with writers claiming her exit was storyline dictated. She last appeared on September 5, 2017. Entertainment Weekly reported the news of Budig's return to General Hospital on May 9, 2019. On June 27, 2019, it was announced that Budig would return in July; she made her first re-appearance during the final moments of the July 8, 2019, episode. However, on November 20, 2019, Budig's exit was confirmed once more; she made her last appearance on November 27, 2019.

=== Storylines ===
Hayden comes to town, paid by Ric Lansing (Rick Hearst) to pose as the wife of the amnesiac Jake Doe (Billy Miller), so that Ric could date Elizabeth Webber (Rebecca Herbst), who was falling for Jake. Hayden's scheme is later exposed, but she finds out that "Jake" is really Jason Morgan, and blackmails Nikolas Cassadine (Tyler Christopher) with this information. However, Nikolas has Hayden shot, leaving her in a coma; she wakes up with amnesia. Hayden moves in with Nikolas, who is keeping an eye on her. Hayden later figures out the truth, but keeps quiet, and starts a relationship with Nikolas. Jason's identity is exposed, and Hayden rubs it in Elizabeth's face when Jason leaves her for her deception. Elizabeth, in turn, promises to make Hayden pay.

Tracy Quartermaine (Jane Elliot) blackmails Hayden with her real identity to take over ELQ from Nikolas. Nikolas and Hayden get married, but he discovers she is Rachel Berlin, the daughter of Raymond Berlin, an imprisoned investment banker. Nikolas demands a divorce, but Hayden blackmails him, threatening to turn Nikolas in for having her shot unless they stay married. Nikolas finds diamonds in Hayden's possession that she stole from her father, and uses them as leverage against Hayden. Hayden is furious, and decides to tell the cops the truth. Nikolas stages his death to disappear and avoid being arrested, but is later presumed dead after being killed. Elizabeth blames Hayden for Nikolas' death, saying she pushed him to go on the run.

Hayden's mother, Naomi Dreyfus (Robin Riker), comes to town to get the diamonds, but they are taken by Elizabeth and handed over to the police. Hayden is revealed to be the daughter of Jeff Webber (Richard Dean Anderson), Elizabeth's father, making her and Elizabeth half-sisters. Hayden ends up becoming friends with Dr. Hamilton Finn (Michael Easton), who is battling a rare disease. Hayden is accidentally infected from one of his experiments, and also falls ill. She and Elizabeth start making amends when Elizabeth shows concern for her. Finn is eventually able to find a cure, saving him and Hayden.

Finn and Hayden start a relationship, until Hayden figures out that he is an addict. Finn eventually goes to rehab, but when he tests positive for drugs, Finn insists he is being set up, and Hayden believes him. She hires investigator Curtis Ashford (Donnell Turner), and is able to prove that Finn's tests were tampered with by Dr. Liesl Obrecht (Kathleen Gati). Obrecht is fired, and Finn is reinstated. While proving Finn's innocence, Hayden discovered that she was pregnant. After Finn returns to work, he proposes to Hayden, who accepts. Obrecht, furious about getting fired, aims to get revenge on Hayden and Finn. She contacts Hayden's ex-husband, Jared Preston Jr. (Matt Corboy), who reveals that Hayden was responsible for a hit-and-run while driving drunk, but he took the blame and went to prison, hoping to get paid. But Hayden's father was arrested, and she could not pay him. He demands payment, or he will tell Finn. Hayden admits the truth to Finn, who decides to forgive her. Afraid of what Jared might do, Hayden skips town on the day of her and Finn's wedding, leaving behind her ring. Finn and Curtis look for her, and discover a note Hayden left for Finn, telling him not to try and find her and that their baby died. Hayden is shown to be lying, though, and leaves, still pregnant, under a new alias.

== Warren Bauer ==
Warren Bauer
- General Hospital character
- Portrayed by: Bradley Cole
- First appearance: March 17, 2010
- Last appearance: July 23, 2010
- Created by: Robert Guza, Jr.
- Introduced by: Jill Farren Phelps
In-universe information
- Occupation: Lawyer
- Wife: Melinda Bauer
- Sons: Kiefer Bauer
- Daughters: Kendra Lennon

Warren Bauer, portrayed by Bradley Cole, was introduced as the father of Kiefer Bauer (Christian Alexander) on March 17, 2010.

=== Casting ===
The cast was announced on February 9, 2010, by Cole himself on Twitter. The character was originally named Carlton Bauer. Cole, known for his portrayals of Richard Winslow and Jeffrey O'Neill, on Guiding Light, was slated to make his first appearance in late March. The casting was later confirmed by Soaps in Depth in its official Twitter account. Dan J. Kroll of Soap Central speculated that Kiefer's abusive behavior could stem from his home environment. Some initially speculated that Cole's Warren would interact with Laura Wright's Carly Jacks. Wright had previously appeared on Guiding Light as Cole's onscreen love interest, Cassie Layne. Soaps In Depth described the character as a "big wig" who works on Wall Street. The Bauer family is very wealthy. Regan Cellura said that Warren is the exact opposite of his characters on Guiding Light.

=== Storylines ===
To get his girlfriend, Kristina Davis (Lexi Ainsworth) to cover for him when he hits her, Kiefer recounts his abusive childhood to her. The character first appears when he is questioned by Lucky Spencer (Jonathan Jackson) about the night Kristina is attacked. However, Warren refuses to blame his son and blames the enemies of Kristina's mob boss father, Sonny Corinthos (Maurice Benard) for the attack. Due to the ongoing investigation, Warren reminds Kiefer that he never approved of his relationship with Kristina. When Kiefer is killed in a hit and run accident, Warren believes Kristina's mother, Alexis (Nancy Lee Grahn) killed his son on purpose, and vows revenge. Warren and wife Melinda (Lisa Waltz) post an online memorial page portraying Kiefer as a great student and great person and openly accuse Alexis of killing their son. He also accuses Ethan Lovett (Nathan Parsons) of being Kristina's "real" attacker. Warren tries to guilt Kristina into falsely accusing Ethan once again by reminding her of Kiefer's love. Warren continues pressuring the police to press charges and continues attacking Kristina and Alexis in public. When Alexis is acquitted, Warren files a wrongful death suit. Warren even pressures federal prosecutor, Claire Walsh (Dahlia Salem) to press charges against Alexis. When Warren gets too aggressive with Alexis and her daughters in public, Sonny openly accuses Warren of abusing his son. In late July, Warren attempts but fails to obtain Kristina's medical records at General Hospital and threatens to sue for obstruction of justice. Warren runs into Kristina and nearly hits her when she berates him for abusing Kiefer, forcing her brother, Michael (Chad Duell), to step in. A fight ensues with Lucky pulling Michael off Warren. When police commissioner Mac Scorpio (John J. York) arrives, Warren snaps and pulls a gun, shooting Mac and Ethan. He is about to open fire on Michael and Kristina when he is shot down by the wounded Mac.

=== Reception ===
Though the role was intended to be short term, TV Source Magazine speculated that it could turn into a much bigger role, considering the show's history of developing minor roles into long-term roles. The Huffington Post said Cole's casting could be the show's attempt to attract viewers from the recently canceled Guiding Light, and though short term, Allison Waldman said it would be a good addition to the cast. The character's surname may have been a nod to the series' core family, the Bauers.

== Claudette Beaulieu ==
Claudette Beaulieu
- General Hospital character
- Portrayed by: Bree Williamson
- Duration: 2016–17
- First appearance: July 5, 2016
- Last appearance: October 27, 2017
- Created by: Jean Passanante and Shelly Altman
- Introduced by: Frank Valentini
In-universe information
- Other names: C.J. Boland
- Occupation: Graphic designer
- Mother: Amelia Beaulieu
- Spouse: Nathan West (2006–16)
- Adoptive daughters: Charlotte Cassadine

Claudette Beaulieu, portrayed by Bree Williamson, first appeared on July 5, 2016. She is the ex-wife of Nathan West (Ryan Paevey).

=== Casting ===
The announcement of Williamson's casting was on May 26, 2016. According to reports, Williamson wrapped her stint on October 24. Williamson made an appearance on October 27, 2017.

=== Storylines ===
Nathan gets shot in February 2016 and, after his surgery, still under the influence of drugs, he refers to Maxie Jones (Kirsten Storms) as Claudette. Nathan later reveals he was married to Claudette to help her stay in the country and she broke his heart. Nathan and Maxie become engaged, and his mother, Liesl Obrecht (Kathleen Gati) advises him to keep quiet about Claudette, fearing he could end up in prison. Nathan later confesses he found Claudette in bed with another man and shot him in a drunken rage. Maxie forgives him, understanding why he felt the need to keep quiet. In July 2016, Claudette comes to town, inquiring about a job at Crimson Magazine, Maxie's workplace. She hides the fact she knows Maxie is engaged to Nathan. Later, she lures Nathan to her hotel room, hoping to talk to him. Maxie, at the same time, finds out who Claudette is, and the two leave. Though Claudette says she is not after Nathan, Maxie is suspicious of her. Claudette reunites with Griffin Munro (Matt Cohen), the man with whom she cheated on Nathan. Griffin is not happy, though, and says he is ashamed of their affair. Claudette says she still loves him and hopes they will be together. Claudette confesses to Nathan she came to Port Charles looking for him because she wants his help to protect her and her daughter from her ex-lover, Valentin Cassadine (James Patrick Stuart). She and her daughter, Charlotte, lived with Valentin, until he became dangerous and threatened her. She took Charlotte and went on the run. Claudette claims Charlotte is Nathan's daughter, but when a DNA test disproves it, she says Griffin is the father. After bringing Charlotte to town, Claudette finds her room ransacked, and realizes Valentin has found her. She skips town, leaving Charlotte behind with Griffin. On the plane, though, she is cornered by Valentin. Nathan finds out he and Claudette are not divorced, and he & Maxie try to track her down so they can get married. A cop tells them Claudette committed suicide. However, the cop was later revealed to be working for Valentin, and Claudette's whereabouts are unknown.

== David Bensch ==
David Bensch
- General Hospital character
- Portrayed by: James DePaiva
- Duration: 2017–18
- First appearance: July 5, 2017
- Last appearance: August 23, 2018
- Created by: Jean Passanante and Shelly Altman
- Introduced by: Frank Valentini
In-universe information
- Occupation: Chief resident

David Bensch, portrayed by James DePaiva, first appeared July 5, 2017. He is the chief resident of General Hospital.

=== Casting ===
The announcement of DePaiva's casting was June 6, 2017.

=== Storylines ===
Bensch, a specialist that Sam (Kelly Monaco) saw to try and figure out what was wrong with her. Unfortunately, at the time, all his tests showed was that she had an iron deficiency. He dates Alexis Davis (Nancy Lee Grahn) for several months, but their relationship eventually ends. Bensch encourages Kiki Jerome (Hayley Erin) to become a medical student. In 2018, he makes sexual harassment advances to Kiki. After dealing with his harassment for several months, Kiki files a lawsuit against Bensch, with Alexis representing her in court. Kiki wins her lawsuit, and Dr. Bensch is suspended from the hospital.

== Drew Cain ==
Drew Cain
- General Hospital character
- Portrayed by: Billy Miller (2014–2019) (Note: The role was originated by an uncredited actor from August 12 to September 25, 2014. Miller debuted on October 1, 2014.); Steve Burton (2017, 2019); Cameron Mathison (2021–present)
- Duration: 2014–2019; 2021–present
- First appearance: August 12, 2014
- Created by: Ron Carlivati, Jean Passanante and Shelly Altman (Note: The character was conceived as a recast of the Jason Morgan character in 2014 under head writer Ron Carlivati. In 2017, the writing team of Jean Passanante and Shelly Altman retconned the Jason recast into an entirely separate character, that of Jason's identical twin brother Drew.)
- Introduced by: Frank Valentini
In-universe information
- Other names: Andrew Moore; Andrew Frank; Andrew Cain; Drew Quartermaine (2024–2025); Jake Doe (2014–2015); Jake Barnes (2015); Jason Morgan (2015–2017)
- Occupation: Navy SEAL; Head of ELQ security (2015); Co-owner and CEO of Aurora Media (2017–2019, 2022–2024); Congressperson (2025–2026)
- Family: Quartermaine
- Parents: Alan Quartermaine; Susan Moore
- Brothers: Jason Morgan
- Half-brothers: Franco Baldwin (foster); A. J. Quartermaine
- Half-sisters: Skye Chandler (adoptive); Emily Quartermaine (adoptive)
- Spouse: Sam McCall (2018); Willow Tait (2025–2026); Ava Jerome (m. 2026)
- Civil partner: Sam McCall (2016–2018)
- Sons: Oscar Nero
- Daughters: Scout Cain
- Stepchildren: Avery Corinthos
- Grandparents: Edward Quartermaine; Lila Quartermaine
- Uncles: Bradley Ward; Jimmy Lee Holt
- Aunts: Tracy Quartermaine
- Nieces and nephews: Michael Corinthos; Lila Rae Alcazar (adoptive); Jake Webber; Danny Morgan
- First cousins: Justus Ward; Ned Quartermaine; Faith Ward; Dillon Quartermaine; Austin Gatlin Holt
- Other relatives: Heather Webber

Drew Cain (also Quartermaine), portrayed by Miller, was introduced in 2014 as a hit-and-run victim with amnesia. The character was created by head writer Carlivati as a recast of the presumed dead Jason Morgan. Andrew, initially referred to as "Jake Doe", is believed to be Jason with plastic surgery and the revelation breaks up his engagement to Elizabeth Webber (Rebecca Herbst). Living as Jason, he reunites with Sam McCall (Kelly Monaco) and they marry and have another child. The couple welcomes a daughter, Emily "Scout" Morgan, named after Jason's late sister. In 2017, with the return of Steve Burton, the head writing team of Jean Passanante and Shelly Altman retconned Miller's portrayal of Jason into that of Jason's previously unknown twin brother, Drew. In July 2019, Miller announced his decision to exit the soap; he was actually fired. Miller made his last appearance on August 21 when the character was seemingly killed off. Miller's performance in the roles of Drew and Jason garnered him a Daytime Emmy Award nomination for Outstanding Lead Actor in a Drama Series in 2018.

In April 2021, Deadline Hollywood announced Cameron Mathison had joined the soap in an undisclosed role. In August of the same year, following increased speculation, Entertainment Weekly announced Mathison's casting in the role of Drew; he debuted in the final moments of the August 16 episode.

== Harrison Chase ==
Harrison Chase
- General Hospital character
- Portrayed by: Josh Swickard
- Duration: 2018–present
- First appearance: February 21, 2018
- Created by: Shelly Altman and Chris Van Etten
- Introduced by: Frank Valentini
In-universe information
- Occupation: Police detective
- Parents: Gregory Chase; Jackie Templeton
- Half-brothers: Hamilton Finn
- Spouse: Willow Tait (2021); Brook Lynn Quartermaine (2024–2026)
- Adoptive children: Phoebe Chase
- Aunts: Laura Templeton
- Nieces: Violet Finn

Harrison Chase, portrayed by Josh Swickard, made his first appearance on February 21, 2018. Swickard auditioned for the role of Peter August. Though he did not get the role, casting directors reached out after Ryan Paevey (Nathan West) opted to leave the show, casting Swickard as a detective hired to replace Paevey's character.

=== Storylines ===
Detective Harrison Chase joins the PCPD, becoming Dante Falconeri's (Dominic Zamprogna) new partner after Dante's former partner, Nathan West (Ryan Paevey), is killed. Chase does his best to prove himself on the police force and get to know Dante, still grieving Nathan. Chase ends up running into his older half-brother, Hamilton Finn (Michael Easton), whom he has not spoken to in years. Though Finn is initially cold and distant towards Chase, the two brothers eventually form a bond and become close. Chase runs into Nelle Benson (Chloe Lanier), whom he investigated previously for her fiancé's death. Nelle seduced him so she wouldn't be charged, and Chase got written up for misconduct. He was fired and nearly had to give up his police career. Chase knows Nelle reported him, and promises to keep an eye on her after finding out she is involved with Michael Corinthos (Chad Duell), a wealthy heir. Michael and Chase team up to arrest Nelle after she sets up Michael's mother, Carly (Laura Wright), to make her look insane. They catch Nelle in the act, and she is sent to prison. Chase becomes attracted to Willow Tait (Katelyn MacMullen), a school teacher, and the two eventually start dating. Chase tries to help Willow when she is threatened by Shiloh (CMcLaughlin), a cult leader whose group, Dawn of Day, Willow was once a part of. Willow was drugged and raped by Shiloh, becoming pregnant, and gave up her son for adoption to protect him from Shiloh. Shiloh finds out, and demands Willow tell him where their son is, taking her to court. Willow refuses, and gets sent to jail. Chase is frustrated at the system failing Willow, and considers resigning. Fortunately, Shiloh's numerous crimes are exposed, and he is sent to prison while Willow is released, and her son is kept safe. The truth eventually comes out that Wiley, Willow's son who was adopted by Lucas Jones (Ryan Carnes) and Brad Cooper (Parry Shen), is actually Michael and Nelle's son, and Willow's son died after he was born. Chase helps Michael rescue Wiley from Nelle when she tries to kidnap him, and later comforts Willow after she finds out about her son's death. Nelle sued Michael for custody, and his lawyer, Diane Miller (Carolyn Hennesy), thought Michael getting married would strengthen his case for custody. She suggested he marry Willow, but Willow refused, being in a relationship with Chase. Unwilling to let Nelle win custody of Wiley, Chase pretended to have an affair with Sasha Gilmore (Sofia Mattsson), Michael's girlfriend. Willow was hurt, and agreed to marry Michael, who won custody of Wiley. Chase was depressed over losing Willow, as Sasha was over Michael. Eventually, Sasha nearly died from a drug overdose, and Chase came clean to Willow about his and Sasha's scheme to stage an affair so Michael would win custody of Wiley. Willow is shocked, but forgives Chase, and the two start to rebuild their relationship. Chase is thrilled when his mother, Jackie Templeton (Kim Delaney), comes to town, but sad when she reveals that she is divorcing his father, Gregory (Gregory Harrison). Chase learns that before Jackie married Gregory, she had a one-night stand with Finn, and Chase could possibly be Finn's son. This is proven true with a DNA test, but Chase refuses to accept Finn as a father, and assures Gregory he will always love him. Chase is hospitalized after mysteriously collapsing. He had been poisoned by Peter August (Wes Ramsey), whose target was actually Finn. Finn desperately worked to find a cure for Chase, but when his cure only made Chase worse, he was forced to admit that Chase was dying. Chase asked Willow to marry him as his last wish, and she accepted. They married in the hospital chapel, and Chase flatlined soon after. Finn revived him, though, and was able to administer a cure that revived Chase and helped him recover. In the process, Finn figured out that Gregory was really Chase's father, because the original DNA test had been tampered with by Cyrus Renault (Jeff Kober).

== Silas Clay ==
Silas Clay
- General Hospital character
- Portrayed by: Michael Easton
- Duration: 2013–15
- First appearance: May 13, 2013
- Last appearance: August 31, 2015
- Created by: Ron Carlivati
- Introduced by: Frank Valentini
In-universe information
- Occupation: Oncologist; Chief of Oncology at General Hospital (2013–15)
- Family: Clay
- Brothers: Stephen Clay
- Wife: Nina Reeves (1991–2015)
- Daughters: Kiki Jerome; Nelle Benson; Willow Tait
- Grandchildren: Wiley Quartermaine-Corinthos; Wiley Cooper-Jones; Amelia Corinthos
- Nephews: Rafe Kovich Jr.

Silas Clay M.D. is a fictional character from the ABC daytime soap opera General Hospital. The role has been portrayed by Michael Easton since May 13, 2013.

=== Casting ===
Michael Easton portrays Silas.

Following the cancellation of fellow ABC daytime soap opera One Life to Live in January 2012, it was announced that Michael Easton, who had portrayed the role of John McBain on the series since October 2003, would bring his character over to General Hospital, after a venture to bring One Life to Live online had fallen apart. Easton had portrayed the character of McBain on General Hospital for little less than a year before it was announced that the efforts to bring One Life to Live online had begun again, and thus they were recalling the character of John McBain (as well as two other former One Life to Live characters) back to the parent series. As Easton was still under contract with ABC at this time, the decision was made to reintroduce the actors to General Hospital as brand new characters. Prior to his role on One Life to Live, Easton had portrayed the role of vampire Caleb Morley on the defunct General Hospital spinoff, Port Charles, from May 2001 to October 2003. In early 2013, Easton's portrayal of Morley was revisited on General Hospital, with the series retconning the entire Morley identity as an alter ego of psychotic serial killer Stephen Clay. In Easton's new role as Dr. Silas Clay, he serves as Stephen's older brother, as well as the paternal uncle of Stephen's son, Rafe Kovich, Jr., with any and all references to John McBain in the General Hospital canon eliminated. On July 29, 2015, it was confirmed that Easton would depart General Hospital in the role of Silas.

=== Storylines ===
Silas was working as a doctor in Manhattan when he encountered Sam Morgan (Kelly Monaco), who believes he is serial killer Stephen Clay. He clarifies he is his older brother. Silas comes to Port Charles to meet his nephew, Rafe Kovich, Jr. (Jimmy Deshler), but Rafe's taken aback, because of Silas' resemblance to Stephen, and turns Silas down. Silas, though, petitions for custody of Rafe from Sam, his legal guardian. At the court hearing, he trashes Sam's image and, outraged, Sam confronts him. Instead, she finds him examining her son, Danny. Silas says Danny might be sick, but Sam walks away, discounting his observation. Sam takes Danny to the hospital, where he is diagnosed with cancer. Silas chooses to stay in town and help with Danny's care, giving up his petition for custody of Rafe. During Danny's treatment, he and Sam grow closer.

Silas later encounters Ava Jerome (Maura West), his old flame, and her daughter, Kiki (Kristen Alderson). Though Ava denies it initially, Silas later finds out Kiki is his daughter. He and Kiki start to bond, and Silas starts dating Sam. When Detective Nathan West (Ryan Paevey) starts questioning Silas about a cold case, Sam finds out Silas is married. Silas admits it, and reveals his wife, Nina, has been in a coma for 20 years. He blames himself, because he was having an affair with Ava, and believes she attempted suicide when she found out. However, he finds out Nathan suspects Silas tried to kill her. Sam helps prove his innocence by revealing Nina's mother, Madeline Reeves (Donna Mills), was the one responsible. Nina (Michelle Stafford) returns soon after, waking up from her coma. She moves in with Silas, who takes care of her, but still dates Sam. Though Nina insists she is fine with Silas moving on, Sam is suspicious.

When Rafe dies in a car accident, Silas is devastated, and accuses Patrick Drake (Jason Thompson), Rafe's doctor, of intentionally killing him since Rafe caused an accident that killed Patrick's son. Sam, though, defends Patrick, and she and Silas break up. Silas realizes Patrick did not kill Rafe, but also finds out Nina intentionally sabotaged his relationship with Sam as revenge for him having sex with Ava.

Having lost Sam for good, Silas helps out Kiki and Ava, who is in hiding after committing murder. When Nina steals Ava's newborn daughter, Avery, Silas helps Kiki bring Avery home. Ava is sent to prison, and Silas helps Kiki take care of Avery. When Ava escapes from prison, she is presumed dead after being shot. However, Silas saves her, and hides her in a facility, where he reveals she is dying of cancer. Though Ava is ready to die, Silas saves her by kidnapping Avery, and taking her bone marrow to save Ava's life. Ava returns to Port Charles under an alias, hoping to get close to Avery. Though Silas knows the truth, she blackmails him with Avery's kidnapping to stay silent. Soon after, Silas is found dead. His killer is revealed to be Madeline, who killed Silas to get her hands on Nina's inheritance.

== Stephen Clay ==
Stephen Clay
- General Hospital character
- Portrayed by: Michael Easton
- Duration: 2001–03; 2013
- First appearance: March 11, 2001
- Last appearance: March 5, 2013
- Created by: James Harmon Brown and Barbara Esensten
- Introduced by: Julie Hanan Carruthers (2001); Frank Valentini (2013)
- Spin-off appearances: Port Charles
- Species: Vampire
In-universe information
- Other names: Father Michael Morley; Caleb Morley; John McBain
- Occupation: Rock musician
- Brothers: Silas Clay
- Wife: Elizabeth Barrington (2002–2003); Livvie Locke (2003)
- Sons: Rafe Kovich Jr.
- Nieces: Kiki Jerome; Nelle Benson; Willow Tait

Stephen Clay is a fictional character from the ABC Daytime soap opera General Hospital, portrayed by Michael Easton. The character is an adaptation of the fictional vampire character Caleb Morley, originated by Easton on the General Hospital spin-off Port Charles from 2001 to 2003. When Caleb was killed at the end of "Tempted," he eventually returned during the story arc "Naked Eyes," this time in the guise of the vampire rock star "Stephen Clay." Caleb Morley aka Stephen Clay remained a fan favorite and primary character until the cancellation of Port Charles in October 2003. Easton joined the cast of One Life to Live, where he played the role of John McBain until its cancellation in January 2012 and then brought the character of McBain to General Hospital. In 2013, writers decided to revisit Caleb's storyline from Port Charles and adapt it into the General Hospital storylines.

=== Storylines ===
Michael Easton plays Stephen.

In January 2013, Lucy Coe, having recently returned to Port Charles after a ten-year absence, has a run-in with Detective John McBain. Lucy claims McBain is a vampire named Caleb Morley, and attempts to stake him in the chest. She is arrested and eventually sent to Ferncliff sanatorium. In the wake of her hospitalization, her estranged husband Kevin Collins returns, stating Lucy's claims of Caleb's existence are merely a psychotic delusion. Meanwhile, Alison Barrington returns to Port Charles, with her teenage son, Rafe Kovich, Jr. Alison also mistakes McBain for Caleb, prompting her to flee. Alison is confronted by Caleb, who kills her. McBain arrives and finds a visibly shaken Rafe holding the murder weapon. Rafe is detained as the primary suspect, and when questioned by Police Commissioner Anna Devane, claims McBain murdered his mother. Meanwhile, Lucy, having learned of Alison's murder, stages a breakout from Ferncliff, with the assistance of Heather Webber and Todd Manning, determined to protect Rafe.

Meanwhile, Caleb poses as McBain and removes Rafe from police custody. He kills a police officer and tries to take Rafe out of Port Charles, but Rafe runs away. He visits a professor at Port Charles University and kills him when he reveals he knows about Caleb. While he is there, Sam Morgan comes to PCU looking for the professor. Caleb becomes fixated on her, believing she is Livvie Locke, his former wife. Caleb goes to the pier, where Heather is with Sam's son, Danny. Caleb chokes Heather and throws her into the water. He tries to take Danny but Todd stops him. After the police leave, he finds Sam and Danny on the pier and kidnaps them. Meanwhile, John, Lucy, and Rafe break out of police custody to try to save Sam and Danny. John heads to PCU, and finds out "Caleb" is actually Stephen Clay, a former rock musician who went insane after the death of his wife, Livvie. Clay played the persona of a vampire onstage and, after his wife died, he believed he was an actual vampire and went on a killing spree before being arrested and thrown into a mental institution he escaped from. Meanwhile, "Caleb" takes Sam and Danny to Wyndemere, telling Sam they will be reunited once he bites her three times. John, Lucy, and Rafe arrive to find Danny alone. "Caleb" ties Sam up in the tunnels but eventually John and Lucy arrive and kill him. Later, Lucy views Stephen's body at the morgue she notices the ring is missing, when Anna gets Lucy out of the morgue. It is revealed the morgue attendant had the ring and when he tries it on, the young attendant is seen lying dead as the figure walks off meaning there really was not a Stephen Clay, but Caleb Morley, the vampire, again using his former alias.

== Brad Cooper ==
Brad Cooper
- General Hospital character
- Portrayed by: Marcus Toji (2013); Parry Shen (2013–present)
- Duration: 2013–present
- First appearance: February 13, 2013
- Created by: Ron Carlivati
- Introduced by: Frank Valentini
In-universe information
- Occupation: Lab technician
- Father: Kim Soong Wu
- Spouse: Rosalie Martinez (until 2016); Lucas Jones (2016–2020)
- Adoptive sons: Jonah Corinthos
- Aunts: Jade Soong; Selina Wu
- Other relatives: Chaing Wu

Bradley "Brad" Cooper was introduced to the series on February 13, 2013, played by Marcus Toji. However, Parry Shen took over the role on May 3, 2013. "I was kind of getting bored and looking for something new. Something to challenge me and get me scared," Shen said of his reason for taking the role. When he auditioned, Shen was told that the role was recurring and did not expect it to last long.

Brad is the scheming lab technician at General Hospital who works to sabotage Sabrina Santiago on behalf of Britt Westbourne in exchange for a promotion. Meanwhile, Brad crushes on Sabrina's best friend, Felix DuBois, and does his best to change his schemes to get Felix to pay attention. However, by the time Felix and Brad start dating, Brad catches the eye of Lucas Jones. Brad is also revealed to be the great-grandson of Mr. Wu, who appeared in the series in the mid-1980s as part of the famous Asian Quarter storyline.

=== Background ===
Shen initially thought his character's surname was a joke because the character was named after the award-winning actor. Brad is bullied as a kid because he was a "fat, Chinese, gay tap dancer." Despite the bullying, Brad was extremely accomplished as a young tap dancer. On January 24, 2014, it is revealed that Brad is the son of Kim Wu (aka Kim Soong) (Steven Leigh), and great-grandson of Mr. Wu (Aki Aleong). Brad was actually adopted and was forced to go searching for his biological roots on his own. Shen also confirmed the revelation on his Twitter account by posting links to YouTube clips featuring the characters. The producers managed to keep the secret up until the onscreen reveal.

=== Characterization ===
"You start seeing another side of Brad. Even though you know he's kind of a prick, he's [also] kind of ashamed of his dad because he took it to a whole new level where it's about murdering and stealing from people who are weak and Brad just doesn't want any part of that. Deep down he's a human being. He's not getting into the family business. He's been adopted—he was bullied. We get to see why he turned out to be the way he is."

— Shen, on how biology has shaped Brad's behavior

The writers initially described the character of Shen as "opportunistic, very smarmy, confident" and someone with an agenda that benefits himself. Shen perceived Brad's advances toward Felix as "power-playing," to get something he wants. However, Shen appreciated that he was not immediately made aware of Brad being gay. Instead of playing with a certain mentality, Shen brought a specific personality to the character, who just happened to be gay. Shen described his portrayal as very "different." Shen categorized Brad as the resident "evil heel." Though Shen does his best to bring humor to the character, he relishes portraying the more raunchy side of his character. On his official website, Shen published a poster ad featuring the character with the caption, "What A Prick!" In the picture, Shen, as Brad is wielding a syringe just like Liesl Obrecht (Kathleen Gati). According to Shen, the character of Brad sticks around because he is so unique.

=== Relationships ===
Throughout 2013, Brad relentlessly pursues Felix. However, Brad slowly develops into a more dimensional character. Brad shows his vulnerability in an effort to prove to Felix that he is good person. In December 2013, Shen revealed that his character had some more material coming up, but he was not sure how much. Brad and Felix's bumpy relationship continues into the new year with several setbacks and after a fight, Brad finds comfort with Lucas Jones (Ryan Carnes) when they commiserate over their shared connections to crime families. Shen compared Lucas and Brad's dynamic to Ross and Rachel from Friends. However, Brad is faced with a dilemma when both men pursue him. Brad has strong feelings for Felix, but he connects with Lucas on a different level. Both men expose very different sides of his character. The revelation gives viewers another perspective on the character. According to Shen, Brad and Lucas see one another as "kindred spirits." Shen said a potential triangle between the three would take some development because very little had been done with Brad and Felix's relationship. However, what excited Shen most about the potential story was that while all the characters are gay, all three are extremely different characters. After Robin Scorpio-Drake (Kimberly McCullough) left to revive Helena (Constance Towers) and Stavros Cassadine (Robert Kelker-Kelly), he begins to replace Robin again like he did last year before he began a relationship with head nurse Epiphany Johnson (Sonya Eddy).

=== Reception ===
Parry Shen revealed that it was about three months after his debut that he started getting recognized by fans. Soap Opera Digest praised the writers for not allowing Brad to be completely defined by his Asian ethnicity. The character received mixed reactions. Jamey Giddens of Daytime Confidential described Shen as a "scene stealer," for his portrayal. Giddens said, "I get a hoot out of his shameful attempts at seducing--and/or blackmailing-- find Britch's horny henchman all shades of skeevy." The poll revealed that 21% (238 voters) loved the character, while 41% (459 voters) did not. However, 37% (415 voters) loved to hate the character. Shen was also welcomed by "boos" at a fan event. On-Air On-Soaps also praised Shen for his portrayal and said the actor "played [Brad] to the hilt." According to Soap Opera Digest, the show has a history of turning secondary characters into breakout characters and "The newest member of this esteemed club is lab rat Bradley Cooper, played by the winning Parry Shen." Brad goes from Britt's "convenient co-conspirator" a secondary character with long term viability. The magazine continued, "the more we know about what lies beneath Brad's bitter surface, the more we like the complex crank and hope he will let his conscience be his guide." Shen ranked at #9 on Daytime Confidential's list of the "10 Best Soap Opera Newbies," for the year 2013. The website praised the actor for cementing Brad as one of the show's "most outrageous characters," and making the character more than just a one note villain. In September 2013, Brad and Felix's scenes in which Brad admits to being bullied as a child were also featured on Chelsea Lately in which Chelsea Handler discusses her love for hospitals.

== Amy Driscoll ==
Amy Driscoll
- General Hospital character
- Portrayed by: Risa Dorken
- Duration: 2016–
- First appearance: May 4, 2016
- Created by: Jean Passanante and Shelly Altman
- Introduced by: Frank Valentini
In-universe information
- Occupation: Nurse
- Brothers: Chet Driscoll

Amy Driscoll, portrayed by Risa Dorken, is a nurse at General Hospital.

=== Casting ===
The announcement of Dorken's casting was made on April 7, 2016.

=== Storylines ===
Amy Driscoll is first seen in early May 2016. She is at the hospital gossiping to Maxie Jones. Later in the month, she is seen gossiping to Dr. Hamilton Finn. In late July, she is seen giving the keys to the art room to Commissioner Jordan Ashford, where Franco works as an art therapist. Amy thinks that Franco is the killer after a fourth person is found dead at the hospital.

== Felix DuBois ==
Felix DuBois
- General Hospital character
- Portrayed by: Marc Anthony Samuel
- Duration: 2012–
- First appearance: December 4, 2012
- Created by: Ron Carlivati
- Introduced by: Frank Valentini
In-universe information
- Occupation: Nurse; Cosmetics consultant
- Sisters: Taylor DuBois

Felix DuBois RN, portrayed by Marc Anthony Samuel, was introduced to the series in late 2012.

=== Casting and portrayal ===
The casting was announced in November 2012, with Samuel's first airdate slated for December 4, 2012. Samuel made his debut as a contract cast member. Samuel revealed to Windy City Times that his management team set him up to audition with casting director Mark Teschner. Samuel was then brought back for a screen test with Teresa Castillo, and they offered him the role a few days later.

What most appealed to Samuel was that Felix was such a diverse character, and immediately sounded like fun. Samuel defended the controversial character and insisted that Felix is not a stereotype or a caricature, but a human being. Samuel described Felix as "campy, extra fierce," and at times he can be the "tough guy," when he feels the need to protect his loved ones. The inspiration for his portrayal of Felix comes from some of Samuel's friends. Felix will "verbally cut you," if you cross him. Samuel and his own father were adamant about not playing the role as a stereotype, but Samuel trusted the head writer and executive producer to do well by the character. On November 10, 2014, it was reported that Samuel had been dropped to recurring status with the series.

=== Development ===
It was revealed that Samuel's Felix would play an integral role in the revival of the once annual tradition, the Nurses' Ball. Michael Fairman said "this new character may be part of an under-represented segment of characters on daytime, in more ways than one!" The statement appeared to be a hint at Felix being black and also gay. Samuel revealed to Daytime Confidential that his bosses encouraged him to improvise a lot of Felix's dialogue. According to Samuel, the writers observed what he brought to the role personally, and used that to write Felix's witty dialogue.

In June 2013, hinted at a potential future love interest for the character. When Bobbie Spencer mentioned her son Lucas Jones (Ryan Carnes)'s troubled dating life, fans immediately assumed the character would return and have a romance with Felix. Samuel said he was definitely open to any romantic possibilities and said he wanted Felix to experience a "fully realized life." Felix at the time is the show's only gay character on canvas, and Samuel said he had a responsibility to play Felix as the "human being" that he is. Samuel was open to the romance, whether it be Lucas, or a new character. In June 2013, Samuel hinted at the fact that introduction of Felix's sister Taylor would lead to development of the character's backstory. Throughout 2013, Felix played the role of the supportive best friend to Sabrina, but his love life is non-existent. However, Samuel maintained that the character would eventually get a love interest.

=== Storylines ===
Felix is a student nurse at General Hospital who befriends Sabrina. He reveals he also works for Lucy Coe (Lynn Herring) as a cosmetics consultant, and agrees to help Sabrina contact her for help with the Nurse's Ball. The duo recruits Lucy and Elizabeth Webber (Rebecca Herbst) to help organize the ball, and Felix gets Carly Jacks (Laura Wright) to donate the ballroom at the Metro Court hotel. Meanwhile, Felix develops a crush on Milo Giambetti (Drew Cheetwood), despite him being straight, and Felix feels betrayed when Sabrina begins dating him after they graduate from nursing school. They eventually reconcile and but are forced to deal with the manipulative Dr. Britt Westbourne (Kelly Thiebaud), the ex-girlfriend of Sabrina's new boyfriend, Dr. Patrick Drake (Jason Thompson), who is pregnant with "their" unborn child. To get information about Britt faking morning sickness, Felix flirts with her flunky Brad Cooper (Parry Shen). Felix later takes in his sister, Taylor (Samantha Logan, Pepi Sonuga). Suspicious of the baby's paternity, Felix and Sabrina set out to prove that Patrick is not the father, but they are unsuccessful. After breaking down Brad's defenses, Felix learns that Britt's mother, Liesl Obrecht (Kathleen Gati) may know the truth about the baby. Felix and Brad begin to bond when Brad shows his human side only for it to be ruined when he claims to be the father of Britt's child. Fortunately, they reconcile when Felix convinces him to play an elf at the Christmas party. In January 2014, Felix asks Brad on a date after they reconcile from another fight after the death of Cesar Faison (Anders Hove).

=== Reception ===
Roger Newcomb of We Love Soaps said the character's debut was filled with "memorable one-liners." TV Source Magazine referred to the character as GH's resident "guru" and compared him to Shell Kepler's Amy Vining. We Love Soaps described Felix as the town's "got to wingman." Walker Ragsdale described his portrayal of Felix as "very authentic," as opposed to "over the top." "Few characters on television right now are better with the turn of a phrase than Felix Dubois," Regan Cellura said of Felix. Of the character, Maria Ciaccia said, "Felix isn't the first gay character on General Hospital, but he's definitely the most fun." In addition to being a "loyal friend, witty and outspoken," Ciaccia believed Felix also has a big heart.

=== "Lipstickgate" ===
Soon after Marc Anthony Samuel's debut as Felix, an openly gay male nurse, some viewers criticized what they called stereotypical homosexual characterization. Most notably, blogger Andy Towle wrote on Towleroad.com, "To establish his character as gay, his first scenes involved him pulling out a tube of lipstick and offering to touch up a heterosexual woman. Oy." Headwriter at the time Ron Carlivati quickly spoke up in defense, citing his experience and various other homosexual characters he created, as well as the GLAAD Media Award he received. Carlivati explained the lipstick was an integral plot point yet to be seen on-screen. Responding directly on Towle's post, Carlivati said, "Does this make him too queeny? Not straight-acting enough? Is that the only type of gay character allowed on TV now? As far as I'm concerned, to be offended by this character is what is offensive." The continued discussion, which Carlivati named "Lipstick-gate" quickly made headlines. Towle soon posted again, stating, "There's no question in my mind that Mr. Carlivati should be allowed the chance to develop his character more fully before judgment is passed and I regret if my commentary suggested that it should. [...] I'm looking forward to seeing how his Felix Dubois character develops and thank him for his remarks and reaction."

== Hamilton Finn ==
Hamilton Finn
- General Hospital character
- Portrayed by: Michael Easton
- Duration: 2016–2024
- First appearance: March 21, 2016
- Last appearance: June 27, 2024
- Created by: Jean Passanante and Shelly Altman
- Introduced by: Frank Valentini
In-universe information
- Other names: Hamilton Chase
- Occupation: Infectious disease doctor
- Parents: Gregory Chase; Jean Nichols Finn
- Stepmother: Jackie Templeton
- Half-brothers: Harrison Chase
- Wife: Reiko Finn (backstory)
- Daughters: Violet Finn

Hamilton Finn is a doctor, played by Michael Easton, and is a colleague of Monica Quartermaine (Charleson).

=== Casting ===
On February 2, 2016, executive producer Frank Valentini, posted that he asked Easton back to General Hospital. Easton was scheduled to appear on March 18, 2016. Due to the death of former First Lady Nancy Reagan and news coverage of her funeral, his first appearance was pre-empted to March 21, 2016. Easton last appeared in the role on June 27, 2024.

=== Storylines ===
Munro has an idea Tracy Quartermaine (Jane Elliot) has an Infectious disease. Hamilton Finn or just simply Finn is contacted by Monica Quartermaine (Charleson) to treat Tracy after chief of neuropathology, Matthew Mayes, confirms Tracy does not have cancer. Finn comes to General Hospital to treat Tracy. He immediately clashes with chief of staff Liesl Obrecht (Kathleen Gati). When Finn and Munro are conferring about Tracy's biopsy, Mayes is displeased they chose to look at his patient's chart without his permission. Finn diagnoses Tracy with having ingested worms. The worms are attacking her brain. Finn wants to put Tracy on medication, but Obrecht refuses since he is not on the hospital staff. He has Monica fill the prescription. While walking Tracy around the hospital, she has another seizure. Finn tells the Quartermaine family she needs surgery. Monica finds a syringe in his locker and suspends him. In mid June 2016, Hayden Barnes (Budig) is talking with Finn. He asks her to get a notebook out of his locker. He tells her he has caught a rare disease. It was later revealed he was framed by Tracy's ex-husband and district attorney Paul Hornsby (Richard Burgi).

== Sasha Gilmore ==
Sasha Gilmore
- General Hospital character
- Portrayed by: Sofia Mattsson (2018–2025); Helena Mattsson (2022)
- Duration: 2018–2025
- First appearance: September 18, 2018
- Last appearance: July 18, 2025
- Created by: Shelly Altman and Chris Van Etten
- Introduced by: Frank Valentini
In-universe information
- Other names: Sasha Corbin
- Occupation: Chef; Investor; Model; Office assistant
- Family: Scorpio
- Father: Robert Scorpio
- Mother: Holly Sutton-Scorpio
- Half-brothers: Ethan Lovett
- Half-sisters: Robin Scorpio
- Spouse: Brando Corbin (2022)
- Children: Liam Corbin; Daisy Gilmore
- Grandparents: Charles Sutton
- Aunts and uncles: Mac Scorpio; Paloma Sutton
- Nieces and nephews: Emma Drake; Noah Drake II; Phoebe Wilson
- First cousins: Cody Bell; Maxie Jones; Georgie Jones

Sasha Gilmore is a fictional character on the ABC soap opera General Hospital. Sofia Mattsson portrayed the role from September 18, 2018, to July 18, 2025.

=== Casting ===
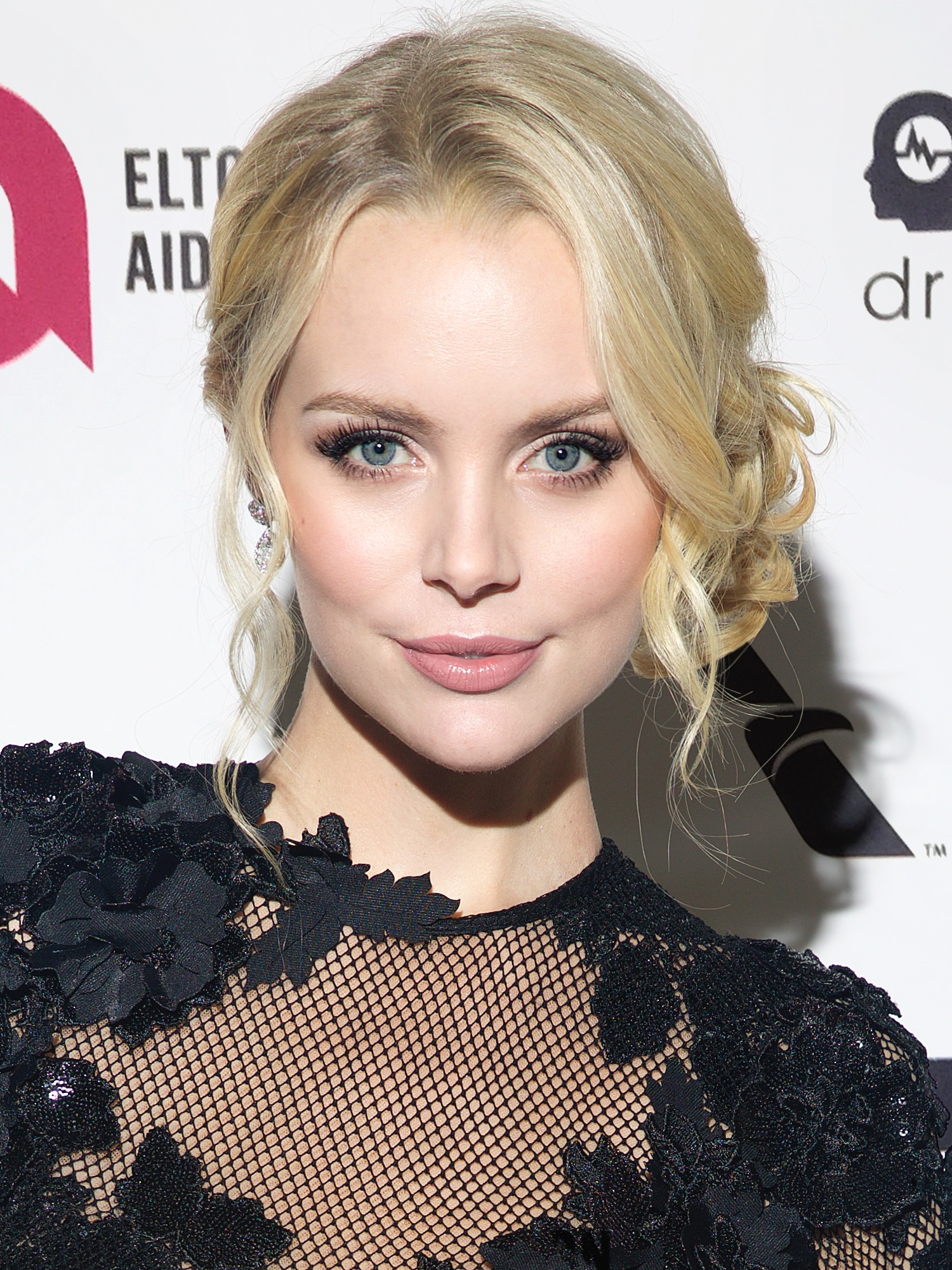
Helena Mattsson (pictured) pinch-hit for sister Sofia for two episodes in February 2022.

Sofia joined the show initially in a short-term capacity, appearing from September 18 to December 12, 2018. She returned on February 5 of the following year in a recurring capacity. On February 16, 2022, it was announced Sofia's sister, Helena Mattsson would temporarily portray Sasha for two episodes. She appeared on February 17 and February 23, 2022, with Sofia returning on March 4. In July 2025, Sofia departed the role, citing her desire to explore other acting opportunities.

=== Storylines ===
Sasha was brought up by her grandmother after her con artist mother, Holly Sutton-Scorpio, abandoned her. Holly kept the identity of Sasha's father a secret and only reappeared once during Sasha's childhood to enlist her in a con.

This experience led Sasha to despise the life of deceit she was drawn into, especially after Holly left her behind in Llanview post a scam involving David Vickers. Sasha disclosed that Holly had tried to contact her over the years, but she never replied. When she arrived in Port Charles, Sasha maintained that she hailed from Chappaqua, New York, and fabricated a story about being raised by a loving single mother named Amanda Gilmore. After Amanda's death, she stated that her only remaining family was her grandmother. When her grandmother fell gravely ill and required surgery, the costs were substantial, even with Medicare. Sasha then encountered Valentin Cassadine and agreed to impersonate Nina Reeves' long-lost daughter for a short period, aiming to earn enough to cover her grandmother's medical bills.

Her life has been marked by an unusual amount of tragedy: overcoming a drug addiction; losing her baby son Liam at a month old, her husband Brando Corbin of only a few months to a serial killer; having a court-appointed conservator over her life; her mother-in-law Gladys Corbin (as conservator) stealing nearly all her money while secretly gambling; being secretly drugged and manipulated by her in-law and court-appointed therapist; and finally, involuntarily placed in a mental institution because of the drugs and nearly killed by her therapist.

In October 2024, her mother arrived in Port Charles to reunite with her friend Felicia Scorpio, Then when she learns about the relationship between Sasha and Mac Scorpio's newfound son, Cody Bell. Holly rushes to the Quartermaine Mansion to tell Sasha to end her relationship with Cody as they're first cousins and the father she never knew is Robert Scorpio, which a DNA test had proved on October 25. After disowning her mother, she went to the Brown Dog Bar to drown her heartbreak of losing Cody, while there she meet with her friend Michael Corinthos, who was also there after learning about his wife Willow's affair with his uncle Drew and they have a one-night stand, which they agree to keep secret.

In November 2024, Sasha learns that she is pregnant with Michael's child from her one-night-stand, after she went to her cousin Maxie Jones for advice and support. The following year, she gives birth to a daughter, Daisy; when she believes someone is targeting Daisy, they leave Port Charles and join Holly and Robert in France.

== Martin Grey ==
Martin Grey, portrayed by Michael E. Knight, made his first appearance on September 30, 2019. His casting was announced on August 20 of that same year.

In September 2019, attorney Martin Grey was introduced as the attorney for Nelle Benson, who had been incarcerated for attempted murder. He would later be recruited by Kim Nero to represent Franco Baldwin in a mental compentancy hearing, as Baldwin believed himself to be Drew Cain due to a brain mapping experiment inflicted upon him by Shiloh Archer.

== Abby Haver ==
Abby Haver
- General Hospital character
- Portrayed by: Andrea Bogart
- Duration: 2010–11
- First appearance: October 5, 2010
- Last appearance: December 15, 2011
- Created by: Robert Guza, Jr.
- Introduced by: Jill Farren Phelps
In-universe information
- Other names: Abigail Martha Haver; Candy
- Occupation: Student; Executive assistant; Exotic dancer

Abby Haver is a fictional character from the ABC Daytime soap opera General Hospital. She was portrayed by Andrea Bogart on a recurring status from the character's first appearance in October 2010 until the character was killed off the show, found in a Chicago morgue on December 15, 2011.

=== Storylines ===
Abby Haver is introduced as the exotic dancer Candy, a friend of Sam McCall. Michael Corinthos tells his uncle, Jason Morgan he is concerned with his lack of experience with a girl due to the time he spent in prison, and wants his help finding a prostitute. Sam calls her friend Candy, who meets Michael in a hotel room, where he learns her real name is Abby. Michael pushes her away when he feels they are moving too fast and leaves. However, they continue run into one another, and start talking about their pasts and future ambitions. They admit to enjoying spending time with one another, and eventually Michael asks Abby out. Michael's mother Carly Corinthos Jacks highly disapproves of their relationship because of the age difference and Abby's profession. She tries to push Abby and Michael apart without success. In January, Abby's ex-boyfriend Brandon Lowell tries to rape Abby and beats her up. Michael hears her and comes to help, momentarily freezing while having flashbacks of prison and an inmate who hurt him. When he breaks out of it, he begins to beat Brandon until Jason comes and pulls him off. Michael finally breaks down and admits to Jason that he was raped in prison, and later tells Abby as well. Anthony Zacchara has Brandon killed and tries to frame Abby for his death, but is not successful. Meanwhile, Abby quits her job as an exotic dancer and continues to become close with Michael. Michael loses his virginity to her in March. When the dancers at Abby's old club start being attacked, Michael fears for Abby's safety and convinces Tracy to send Abby on a business trip out of town. Tracy sends her to Chicago, where Abby is killed in a construction accident. Michael blames himself for sending her out of town and has a hard time coping with her death.

== Stella Henry ==
Stella Henry
- General Hospital character
- Portrayed by: Vernee Watson
- Duration: 2017–
- First appearance: June 7, 2017
- Created by: Shelly Altman; Jean Passanante
- Introduced by: Frank Valentini
In-universe information
- Occupation: Social worker at General Hospital
- Siblings: Irene Ashford
- Nephews: Thomas Ashford; Curtis Ashford
- Other relatives: TJ Ashford; Trina Robinson

Stella Henry has been portrayed by actress Vernee Watson since June 7, 2017.

== Theo Hoffman ==
Theo Hoffman
- General Hospital character
- Portrayed by: Daniel Benzali
- Duration: 2010–11
- First appearance: December 6, 2010
- Last appearance: March 31, 2011
- Created by: Robert Guza, Jr.
- Introduced by: Jill Farren Phelps
In-universe information
- Other names: The Balkan
- Occupation: Lawyer; International crime lord
- Wife: Suzanne Stanwyck
- Sons: Aleksander Janacek
- Grandsons: Alec Barrett

Theo Hoffman is a fictional character on the ABC soap opera General Hospital. Daniel Benzali portrayed the role, first appearing on December 6, 2010. Headwriter at the time Robert Guza Jr. named the character after Benzali's famed role as Theodore Hoffman on Murder One. The network was mysterious when discussing his role, stating "there is more to Theo than meets the eye." Later that month, Hoffman was revealed to be The Balkan, the international crime lord terrorizing Brenda Barrett.

=== Storylines ===
Theo Hoffman is first seen in Port Charles at General Hospital, complaining about a number of vague symptoms. The doctors run a battery of tests; meanwhile Theo befriends Dr. Robin Scorpio. They determine he is healthy, and he returns a few days later filing a malpractice suit against the hospital, stating they did not correctly diagnose his hypochondria.

Theo is soon seen starting work at Diane Miller's law firm, where she puts him in charge of the wrongful death lawsuit filed against mobster Sonny Corinthos' fiancée, Brenda Barrett, and his newfound son, Dante Falconeri. In order to save Dante's life, Brenda had shot a man named Anton Banovic, who had been sent by an international crime lord named The Balkan to kidnap Brenda, who wants Brenda to answer for killing his son, Aleksander Janáček. Aleksander had stalked Brenda to New York City, where she was being guarded at the time by Dante. One night Aleksander was about to kill Dante when Brenda picked up his gun and shot Aleksander. Dante had covered up the death to spare Brenda further trauma. Soon, it is revealed that Theo Hoffman is actually The Balkan.

On Brenda's wedding day it is publicly announced that Brenda had been pregnant with Aleksander's child and miscarried. Meanwhile, Suzanne Stanwyck, Brenda's coworker and friend, is secretly revealed to be Theo Hoffman's wife. After the ceremony, Theo kidnaps Brenda by bombing her limo, and leaving Sam McCall in her place. Once he has her captive, he learns that Brenda had been pregnant with his grandson, and becomes suspicious that the child is still alive. He berates Suzanne and Brenda for his location, but both insist the child died. Eventually, Sonny, Dante and Jason Morgan rescue Brenda while Theo and Suzanne get away. Theo is tricked into believing that he is going to meet his grandson but is killed by Suzanne.

== Ewen Keenan ==
Ewen Keenan
- General Hospital character
- Portrayed by: Nathin Butler
- Duration: 2011–12
- First appearance: October 21, 2011
- Last appearance: September 5, 2012
- Created by: Garin Wolf
- Introduced by: Jill Farren Phelps
In-universe information
- Occupation: Psychiatrist

Ewen Keenan Psy.D. is a fictional character from the ABC daytime soap opera General Hospital. The character was portrayed by Australian actor Nathin Butler from October 21, 2011 to September 5, 2012.

=== Storylines ===
Psychiatrist Dr. Ewen Keenan first appears in October 2011 as the mysterious stranger who rescues Elizabeth Webber after she is pushed off a cruise ship by Lisa Niles. Ewen is staying at Wyndemere Castle, the Cassadine family estate on Spoon Island with his patient, whom he refers to as "Cassandra". In December 2011, Ewen appears at Shadybrook Sanitarium where he officially meets Elizabeth, and is soon revealed as Port Charles' new psychiatrist at General Hospital. Ewen later asks Alexis Davis to allow him to officially rent Wyndemere, believing it will help "Cassandra's" recovery. "Cassandra" is revealed to be Irina Cassadine, the daughter of Helena Cassadine, who murders her. Meanwhile, Ewen begins helping Kate Howard, who he diagnoses with dissociative identity disorder. Kate's alter Connie hits Ewen on the head with a paperweight, putting him into a coma. Patrick Drake operates on Ewen, who is able to recover. Ewen and Elizabeth continue to grow closer. In July 2012, Ewen starts counseling Patrick, who has developed a prescription pill addiction while grieving for his wife, Robin Scorpio. Ewen is seen helping hold Robin captive, under orders from Jerry Jacks. Jerry blackmails Ewen for his involvement in the death of Jerry's father John Jacks years prior. Ewen killed John in revenge for stealing the dead man's hand cards from Ewen's father which led to him committing suicide. Patrick and Elizabeth find out about Ewen's association with Jerry after Jerry announces to the citizens of Port Charles he released a deadly pathogen in the town's water supply. Ewen knocks out Patrick with a baseball bat and kidnaps Elizabeth to an abandoned shack. Jason Morgan comes to her rescue and shoots Ewen. Ewen asks for Patrick, who arrives too late. Ewen dies before he can tell Patrick that Robin is still alive.

== Janice Lomax ==
Janice Lomax
- General Hospital character
- Portrayed by: Saidah Arrika Ekulona (2012–15); Shari Belafonte (2016–17)
- Duration: 2012–17
- First appearance: May 23, 2012
- Last appearance: December 20, 2017
- Created by: Ron Carlivati
- Introduced by: Frank Valentini
In-universe information
- Occupation: Mayor of Port Charles (2012–17)

Janice Lomax, originally portrayed by Saidah Arrika Ekulona and later portrayed by Shari Belafonte, was introduced on May 23, 2012, as the mayor of Port Charles.

=== Storylines ===
Mayor Janice Lomax first appears in May 2012, in order to terminate Mac Scorpio (John J. York) from his position as police commissioner, citing the unsolved deaths of Cole Thornhart and his daughter Hope and also the death of Robin Scorpio-Drake (Kimberly McCullough), as well as the actions of corrupt detective Ronnie Dimestico (Ronnie Marmo), as her main reasons why. Lomax also expressed concern following the conviction and imprisonment of Mac's stepdaughter Maxie Jones (Kirsten Storms) in connection with the murder of Lisa Niles (Brianna Brown), and the potential negative publicity it could bring the police department, and by extension, the mayor's office. Lomax subsequently pursues Anna Devane (Finola Hughes) to succeed Mac, a job which she ultimately accepts despite some early reluctance.

Lomax resurfaces in August 2012 to appoint John McBain (Michael Easton), while Commissioner Devane is away in Europe, in charge of the police investigation into a terrorist act committed by Jerry Jacks (Sebastian Roché), where he contaminated the water supply with a dangerous pathogen.

In March 2013, Lomax appears again to figure out what to do with the escape situation aftermath of Lucy Coe (Lynn Herring), John McBain and Rafe Kovich, Jr. (Jimmy Deshler) escaping with the help of Molly Lansing-Davis (Haley Pullos) to save Sam Morgan (Kelly Monaco) and her son Danny from the detained Caleb Morley (Michael Easton). Anna tries to resign from the police commissioner position, but Mayor Lomax cannot let this happen. She says that would impact her image too much and tries to figure out what to do with the fugitives. She says that if they release them, they would be encouraging vigilantism, but if they press charges, it would cause problems too. She goes to the media in the police department's main room and says that the three fugitives were acting in accordance with Police Commissioner Anna Devane and are going to be released.

She was set to officiate the wedding between Laura Spencer (Genie Francis) and Scott Baldwin (Kin Shriner), but she was too booked and Lesley Webber (Denise Alexander) decided to step in.

In 2015, Lomax replaced Anna with Jordan Ashford as the Police Commissioner. Lomax has Ric take over the district attorney duties when Scott leaves the post to defend his son (Roger Howarth). She has Paul Hornsby (Richard Burgi) to take over the post.

In January 2016, Lomax wishes to use the Metro Court Hotel. While making the arrangements official, she finds a problem with Olivia Falconeri (Lisa LoCicero) breastfeeding her son in public. Lomax soon has Olivia arrested. The charges are dropped after Alexis Davis (Nancy Lee Grahn) takes on Olivia's case.

In December 2017, Lomax resigns after Lulu Falconeri (Emme Rylan) exposes that her election win against Felicia Jones Scorpio (Kristina Wagner) was rigged.

== Andre Maddox ==
Andre Maddox
- General Hospital character
- Portrayed by: Anthony Montgomery
- Duration: 2015–2019, 2022
- First appearance: November 6, 2015
- Last appearance: December 28, 2022
- Created by: Jean Passanante and Shelly Altman
- Introduced by: Frank Valentini
In-universe information
- Other names: Arthur Mitchell
- Occupation: Psychiatrist
- Wife: Kida Maddox

Andre Maddox Psy.D., played by Anthony Montgomery, is a colleague of Dr. Kevin Collins (Jon Lindstrom).

=== Casting ===
In 2011, Montgomery portrayed the character of Aaron. In September 2015, Soap Opera Digest reported that General Hospital had cast an African American actor for a "key role." The actor made quite an impression opposite one the show's popular leading ladies during his screen test. On October 22, 2015, it was announced that Anthony Montgomery would make his debut on November 6 as Anna Devane's (Finola Hughes) new psychiatrist. Montgomery was best known for his role of Travis Mayweather Star Trek: Enterprise and had a brief stint on General Hospital in 2011 as Aaron. Montgomery also had several prime time guest appearances on Grey's Anatomy, Baby Daddy, House and NCIS. Soaps In Depth reported that Jon Lindstrom had only agreed to return to the series on a recurring basis and had already finished taping. To continue the story, the writers have Andre take over Anna Devane's (Finola Hughes) case from Kevin. However, Anna is hesitant because Andre is a stranger and clash during their first session. After being on recurring status, Montgomery was put on contract on December 3, 2015. As of December 1, 2017, Montgomery was listed as a recurring cast member. Montgomery wrapped his stint on December 15, 2017. However, the door was left often for potential return. Montgomery returned on February 15, 2018. In March 2019, it was announced Montgomery would again return as Andre, he returned for a one-off visit on the March 14 episode. He continued appearing until December 17, 2019, before returning briefly on December 28, 2022.

=== Storylines ===
Maddox is contacted by Dr. Kevin Collins (Jon Lindstrom) to take over Anna Devane's (Finola Hughes) case. However, Anna is hesitant because Andre is a stranger and clash during their first session. Their next session, Maddox tells Anna that she needs to tell him what is bothering her. On the third session, Anna reveals that she had murdered Carlos Rivera. She tells the doctor that she may not be seeing things as a ghost does not leave personal things behind. At Thanksgiving dinner, the two are confronted on a personal level as Anna's ex Son in Law, Dr. Patrick Drake (Jason Thompson), invites Dr. Maddox to dinner since he could not get to Chicago to be with his family. Andre began dating Jordan Ashford. Jordan's work issues and Andre's confidential work with Anna caused strain in the relationship. Jordan believed that there was more going on between Anna and Andre. Andre denied any romantic feelings for Anna. Jordan and he break up after she admits feelings for Curtis Ashford, her ex-brother-in-law. He later shared a moment with Anna; while dancing together they kiss. They decide not to pursue a relationship as to not risk the friendship. He later sees Franco and Jake Weber as patients. It is later revealed that Andre developed a method of recording and transferring memories and used it to wipe Drew Cain's memories and replace them with his twin brother's, Jason Morgan. Andre was arrested and incarcerated. Andre was visited by Anna in mid-February 2018. He was released by the WSB in order to help in memory mapping.

== Siobhan McKenna ==
Siobhan McKenna
- General Hospital character
- Portrayed by: Erin Chambers
- Duration: 2010–11
- First appearance: September 15, 2010
- Last appearance: November 16, 2011
- Created by: Robert Guza, Jr.
- Introduced by: Jill Farren Phelps
In-universe information
- Other names: Siobhan Mary Francis McKenna
- Occupation: Waitress
- Parents: Thomas McKenna; Shannon O'Reilly
- Siblings: Fiona McKenna; Meghan McKenna
- Husband: Lucky Spencer (2011)

Siobhan Spencer is a fictional character from the American daytime soap opera General Hospital. Portrayed by actress Erin Chambers, she first appeared on September 15, 2010, on a recurring basis. Siobhan becomes a love interest for Lucky Spencer (Jonathan Jackson). In January 2011, it was announced that Chambers was put on contract with the series, shortly after the announcement that Rebecca Herbst had been let go, who portrays the other love interest of Lucky. Herbst was kept on, and Chambers was let go from the series in August 2011. Chambers briefly reprised the role in November 2011, when her character appears to Lucky in a dream.

=== Storylines ===
Siobhan sees Lucky Spencer posing as Ronan O' Reilly in Ireland and accuses him of killing her boyfriend. She hears him talking about being undercover, so Lucky takes her with him back to Port Charles for safety. Siobhan is revealed to be working for The Balkan, who is blackmailing her with threats to her kidnapped sister Fiona. Lucky finds out and helps her rescue her sister. They plan a green card marriage, but at the ceremony learn that Lucky's son Jake had been in a hit and run accident. They later get married in May 2011. After, Lucky sets the Spencer home on fire, Siobhan goes in to find him and is injured. During surgery, Elizabeth Webber accidentally administers the wrong medication, but Siobhan believes she did it on purpose. In August, Elizabeth and Siobhan get into a car crash. At the hospital, Anthony Zacchara kills Siobhan with Trimethyltin chloride. In November, Lucky sees Siobhan in a dream.

=== Reception ===
Chambers received praise for her performance of Siobhan. During the revelation of Siobhan's alliance with The Balkan and betrayal to Lucky, entertainment journalist Michael Fairman commented: "This week, [Jonathan Jackson] was ably well-supported in performances by newcomer Erin Chambers (Siobhan) who in twist and turns conveyed high emotional stakes for Jackson to play off of." Entertainment website Zap2it named Chambers the No. 6 Top Newcomer of 2010, elaborating: "Chambers' portrayal of the strong-willed, independent-yet-vulnerable Siobhan has injected refreshing new energy into Lucky's storyline and has proven to be one of the few bright spots in the monotonous Balkan storyline." By the end of 2011, Zap2it named Siobhan and Lucky the No. 6 Worst Soap Opera Couple of 2011, stating: "When General Hospital's Siobhan (Erin Chambers) was first introduced in 2010, the character was like a breath of fresh, Irish spring air. (...) We spent 2011 desperately clinging to those few early memories, as Siobhan transformed from an appealing character into a shrill, insecure harpy (...) Try as Jackson and Chambers might, the actors were unable to salvage an ounce of their prior appeal as a couple."

== Trey Mitchell ==
Trey Mitchell
- General Hospital character
- Portrayed by: Erik Valdez
- Duration: 2012–13
- First appearance: June 11, 2012
- Last appearance: January 14, 2013
- Created by: Ron Carlivati
- Introduced by: Frank Valentini
In-universe information
- Other names: Joseph Mitchell Scully III
- Occupation: Custodian at St. Timothy's Catholic Church; Producer of Mob Princess; Graduate student
- Parents: Joe Scully, Jr.; Connie Falconeri
- Spouse: Kristina Davis (2012)
- Grandparents: Joe Scully; Marie Scully
- Other relatives: Olivia Falconeri; Dante Falconeri

Trey Mitchell, portrayed by Erik Valdez, made his first appearance on June 11, 2012. According to a spokesperson from the series, the character will be involved in quite a bit of storyline throughout 2012. It was reported in November 2012 that Valdez was let go from the series.

Trey is introduced in June 2012 as a graduate student at Yale University and friend of Kristina Davis. Trey is the producer of Kristina's reality television show Mob Princess, and manipulates her into continuing the show despite her family's disapproval. Trey immediately clashes with Kristina's parents, Alexis Davis and mob boss Sonny Corinthos. He convinces Sonny to agree to the reality show while keeping his mysterious boss up-to-date on the project. Trey moves into his new apartment and clashes with his roommate, Starr Manning. Meanwhile, Kristina's brother, Michael accuses Trey of manipulating and using both Kristina and Starr, though he denies it. Trey continues to make enemies when it comes to Starr's father, Todd, while he is oblivious to the fact that Kristina has a crush on him. Meanwhile, Trey bashes Sonny's girlfriend Kate Howard when it is revealed that her alternate personality caused the car accident killing Starr's family. Meanwhile, Kristina reveals her true feelings for Trey and they share their first kiss in July 2012; however, Trey is hesitant about getting involved with her fearing it will interfere with the show. It is soon revealed that Trey is actually the son of Sonny's longtime nemesis Joe Scully Jr, who is financing the show. Kristina continues her flirtatious behavior while Trey becomes determined to catch Sonny doing something illegal on camera. Trey is shocked to find his father in prison in Atlantic City. Joe admits that his father Joe Sr. was a mobster that Sonny used to work for, and convinces Trey to keep his true identity a secret so they can get revenge on Sonny for framing him for murder. He also coerces Trey into ending the reality show and romancing Kristina. In late August, Joe coerces Trey into eloping with Kristina Las Vegas. Trey leads Kristina to believe that they have to get married for the show so he will not be sued. In September 2012, Trey has a confrontation with Kate, who recognizes a medal that he was wearing as being identical to one that Joe wore the night he raped her, leading her to realize that Trey is the son she conceived as the result of the rape. This revelation prompts Kate's alter, Connie, to emerge, and she proceeds to tell Trey that she wished he had never been born. In October 2012, Joe abducts Kristina on orders from Cesar Faison, who intends to have Joe kill her in a convoluted effort to gain control of Sonny's assets. Trey attempts to wrestle the gun away from Joe, but inadvertently ends up shooting him the shoulder, resulting in Joe fleeing the scene before he can fulfill Faison's orders. Subsequently, Trey's connection to Joe is revealed, prompting Kristina to end her marriage to him, and Trey is evicted from the apartment he shared with Starr Manning by its original owner, Maxie Jones. Trey spends the next few months living at the local church, all the while attempting to aid Sonny in his quest to have Connie committed to Shadybrook Sanitarium, which ultimately fails. As time goes on, Trey and Kristina reconcile, and plan to relocate to California. However, their plans are derailed when, on New Year's Eve, they are involved in a car accident, which causes an aneurysm in Trey's brain to rupture, rendering him brain dead on January 8, 2013. Trey is left on life support, and Connie, as the nearest living relative, is left to pull the plug. Initially refusing to do so, Connie eventually does and Trey dies on January 14, 2013.

In 2012, Hollie Deese from Soaps She Knows praised Trey, writing that he was initially "hard to like" but later "grew" on her.

== Griffin Munro ==
Griffin Munro
- General Hospital character
- Portrayed by: Matt Cohen
- Duration: 2016–2019
- First appearance: February 5, 2016
- Last appearance: December 10, 2019
- Created by: Jean Passanante and Shelly Altman
- Introduced by: Frank Valentini
In-universe information
- Other names: Griffin Fitzhugh Munro
- Occupation: Neuropathologist; Priest
- Parents: Duke Lavery; Margaret Munro
- Stepmother: Anna Devane (1987–89)
- Grandparents: Angus McKay; Mary Fitzhugh
- Other relatives: Patrick Lavery; Camellia McKay

Griffin Munro portrayed by actor Matt Cohen was introduced onscreen February 5, 2016, as the former medical school colleague of Lucas Jones (Ryan Carnes).

=== Casting ===
Cohen's casting was announced by Soaps In Depth on January 16, 2016. Cohen was known for several guest stints in prime time, as young John Winchester on the CW show Supernatural, and most recently ABC prime time legal drama, How to Get Away with Murder. There was very little information made available about the character ahead of his debut. Cohen's casting came on the heels of the soap losing one of its longtime leading men Jason Thompson in the role of Patrick Drake, and the character's introduction would help replenish the hospital. In March 2019, it was announced that Cohen decided to exit the soap; he made his final appearance in the role on March 22, 2019. In December 2019, it was announced that Cohen would return to the role for a special guest stint, which aired from December 6 to 10.

=== Storylines ===
Griffin bonds with mobster Sonny Corinthos (Maurice Benard) in the hospital chapel when they relate to losing a loved one to HIV/AIDS. Griffin is later revealed to be the new resident neurosurgeon and a friend resident trauma surgeon Lucas Jones (Carnes). Lucas and Griffin attended medical school together and though Lucas was a year behind him, Griffin always admired how good he was. He quickly realizes Sonny is concealing the truth about his paralyzed condition due to his work. He later comforts Elizabeth Webber after her house burns down. Griffin later apologizes to Sonny's wife Carly (Laura Wright) for having kept Sonny's condition secret from her. It is later revealed that Griffin has been stalking Anna Devane (Finola Hughes). Meanwhile, Griffin witnesses Tracy Quartermaine (Elliot) collapse from a seizure and convinces her with the help of her son Dillon (Robert Palmer Watkins) to admit herself to GH for treatment. However, Tracy prefers resident neurosurgeon Matthew Mayes (Riedy) as her doctor. Griffin clashes with Dr. Mayes when he believes Mayes has misdiagnosed Tracy's condition. Dillon personally request Griffin's second opinion. Anna later discovers some information about Griffin that leads her to believe he is connected to her late love, Duke Lavery (Ian Buchanan). Anna confronts Griffin who finally admits that he is Duke's son. Duke was involved with Griffin's mother before he left Scotland for Port Charles. After Griffin's birth, she attempts to contact Duke but decides against interrupting his new life with Anna opting to raise her son on her own. Meanwhile, when Mayes misdiagnoses Tracy and consults with specialist Hamilton Finn (Easton) to help treat her. By April 2016, Tracy's health worsens and she requires surgery and picks Griffin over Mayes. Meanwhile, Griffin bonds with Anna's granddaughter Emma (Brooklyn Rae Silzer) who is visiting from California. He also urges Anna and Sonny to avoid seeking revenge on Carlos Rivera (Jeffrey Vincent Parise) — the man who killed Duke. Griffin was in a relationship with Ava Jerome but break up due to him having sex with her daughter Kiki, who he was dating at the time of her death at the hands of Ryan Chamberlain. After grieving the loss of Kiki for several months, Griffin decides to leave town in order to find peace.

== Kim Nero ==
Kim Nero
- General Hospital character
- Portrayed by: Tamara Braun
- Duration: 2017–2019
- First appearance: November 22, 2017
- Last appearance: November 18, 2019
- Created by: Shelly Altman; Chris Van Etten
- Introduced by: Frank Valentini
In-universe information
- Occupation: OB/GYN
- Children: Oscar Nero; Andy Nero

Kim Nero is a fictional character from the ABC soap opera General Hospital. The role has been portrayed by Tamara Braun since November 22, 2017. On November 13, 2019, it was announced that Braun would be exiting the role, and she made her last appearance on November 18, 2019.

=== Casting ===
On September 19, 2017, an article from Daytime Confidential rumored that Tamara Braun, who had previously portrayed Carly Corinthos from 2001 to 2005, would be returning to General Hospital in what was described as a "new-but-pivotal" role. Braun's return to the series was confirmed in an article from Entertainment Weekly on October 25, 2017, which also confirmed she would be portraying a new character In an interview with Soap Opera Digest, Braun confirmed she would be portraying Kim Nero, the mother of character Oscar Nero (Garren Stitt)

=== Storylines ===
In 2017, Kim and her son, Oscar, moved to Port Charles, NY, where she took a job at Mercy Hospital while Oscar settled into a new high school and befriended, Josslyn Jacks (Eden McCoy). When the two teenagers began dating, Josslyn's mother, Carly Corinthos (Laura Wright) became eager to meet Kim, which Oscar kept delaying due to Kim's long working hours. However, when Carly invited Kim to Thanksgiving dinner, she eagerly accepted the invitation. At the dinner, Kim met Jason Morgan (Steve Burton), who she recognized as Andrew Cain. Carly explained that Jason was Drew's twin brother, and that the two had been separated at birth. With Carly eager to know what Kim knew about Drew, who had been rendered amnesiac and had required facial reconstruction surgery due to injuries sustained in an auto accident, Kim explained she had casually dated Drew for a short time in San Diego. After Drew, who was a Navy SEAL, was redeployed, Kim discovered she was pregnant with Oscar and attempted to contact him, but was told that he deserted and eventually stopped looking for him. Years later, Kim had attempted to run Oscar's DNA through an ancestry site in order to locate Drew or any of his family due to Oscar's curiosity about his father. It was at this point that Kim learned that Oscar had family living in Port Charles, so she and Oscar relocated in order to find Drew and his family. Shocked to discover that Oscar was Quartermaine following her move from Mercy Hospital to General Hospital, Kim was greeted warmly by chief of staff Dr. Monica Quartermaine (Leslie Charleson), Oscar's grandmother. Despite having no memory of his relationship with Kim, Drew (Billy Miller) was eager to build a relationship with Oscar. In an effort to spark some memory of his past, Kim gave Drew a CD of music that he had made for her before he left San Diego, for which he was grateful. With no indication that Drew recalled their past or harbored any romantic feelings towards her, Kim focused on her role at General Hospital and struck up a friendship with Julian Jerome (William deVry), which later turned into a romantic relationship. In September 2018, Oscar was revealed to be dying of an inoperable Grade IV Glioblastoma, which had Kim had been aware of for two years without telling him. Oscar was furious with his mother for lying to him and began to drift toward a cult led by Hank "Shiloh" Archer (Coby Ryan McLaughlin), but never became substantially involved with them. On New Years, Kim kissed Drew, and in his anger Julian ended his relationship with her, even going so far to lie about having sex with someone else. After some time, Kim and Julian were able to reconcile their relationship. In March 2019, Dr. Terry Randolph (Cassandra James) informed Kim, Drew and Oscar that the Glioblastoma had advanced, and Oscar had only six months to live. On April 29, 2019, three and half weeks after experiencing a severe seizure, Oscar died surrounded by Josslyn, Kim and Drew at the Quartermaine Mansion. Oscar was cremated and honoring his wishes, a devastated Kim and Drew climbed to the summit of Kilimanjaro and scattered his ashes there. In her grief, Kim began to spiral out of control, becoming obsessed with having another baby. After failing to convince Julian to conceive a child with her, she drugged and attempted to rape Drew at the wedding reception for Franco Baldwin (Roger Howarth) and Elizabeth Webber (Rebecca Herbst) as an alternative. Julian, recognizing that Kim was losing control, was able to stop her and after waking up and realizing what had happened, Drew opted not to press charges against her. In August 2019, a flash drive containing Drew's memories prior to arriving in Port Charles was stolen by Shiloh, who had kidnapped Cameron Webber (William Lipton) and attempted to implant them into his brain. Having been discovered by Franco, he opted to take Cameron's place in the experiment, and once he woke up, firmly believed himself to be Drew Cain. After running into Kim at General Hospital, Franco began relaying memories of Drew's past with Kim to her as if he himself had lived them. Distressed and demanding answers as to what was going, Elizabeth and the real Drew explained everything to her. Shortly thereafter, Drew left Port Charles in an effort to locate Dr. Andre Maddox (Anthony Montgomery), who he believed stood the best chance of restoring Franco to his former self. When Drew was declared dead after his plane has crashed, Kim began to fall in love with Franco and became convinced that she had a second shot at the relationship she had missed out on years earlier with Drew. Desperate for a future with "Drew" free of his ties to all of Franco's loved ones, Kim sought help from attorney Martin Gray (Michael E. Knight) in an effort to grant Franco the right to live his life as Drew Cain. As their relationship deepened, the two made plans to leave Port Charles and begin their life together. Following a conversation with Scott Baldwin (Kin Shriner), who explained to "Drew" that Franco had protected him from sexual predator Jim Harvey as a child, "Drew" informed Kim that he could not leave with her, and that he owed it to Franco to try to give him his life back, effectively ending their relationship. Devastated, a heartbroken Kim left Port Charles behind.

== Nina Reeves ==
Nina Reeves
- General Hospital character
- Portrayed by: Michelle Stafford (2014–2019); Cynthia Watros (2019–present)
- Duration: 2014–present
- First appearance: May 1, 2014
- Created by: Ron Carlivati
- Introduced by: Frank Valentini
In-universe information
- Other names: Nina Addison Reeves; Nina Clay; Nina Lansing; Nina Cassadine
- Occupation: Editor-in-chief of Crimson magazine (2015–2024); Socialite
- Father: Dan Reeves
- Mother: Madeline Reeves
- Brothers: Nathan West (adoptive)
- Husband: Silas Clay (1991–2015); Ric Lansing (2015); Valentin Cassadine (2016–2018); Sonny Corinthos (2023–2024)
- Daughters: Nelle Benson; Willow Tait
- Stepsons: Dante Falconeri; Michael Corinthos (adoptive)
- Stepdaughters: Kristina Davis; Avery Corinthos; Donna Corinthos
- Grandchildren: Wiley Cooper-Jones; Jonah Corinthos; Amelia Corinthos
- Aunts: Liesl Obrecht
- Nephews: James West (adoptive)
- First cousins: Britt Westbourne; Nathan West

Nina Reeves is a fictional character from the ABC soap opera General Hospital. The role was played by Michelle Stafford from 2014 to 2019. In June 2019, Cynthia Watros assumed the role of Nina.

=== Casting ===
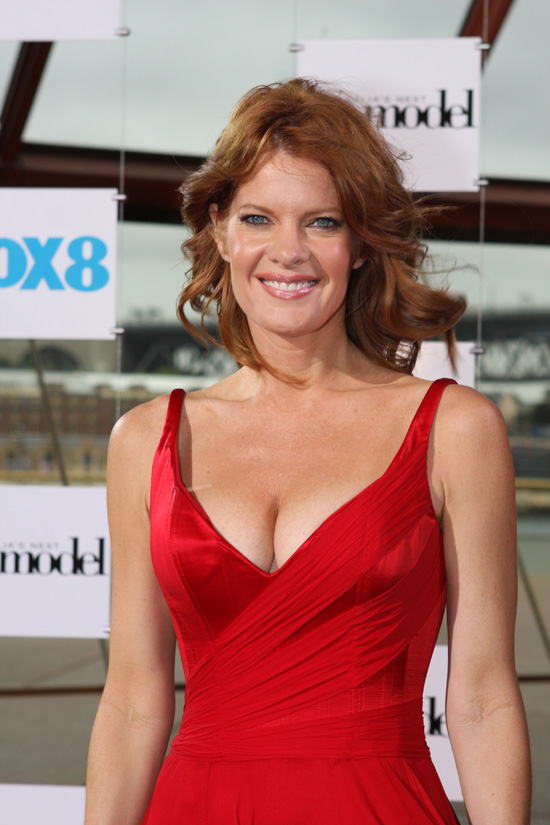
Michelle Stafford's arrival to the soap was part of a surprise reveal during May Sweeps in 2014; she departed the soap in June 2019, after five years in the role.

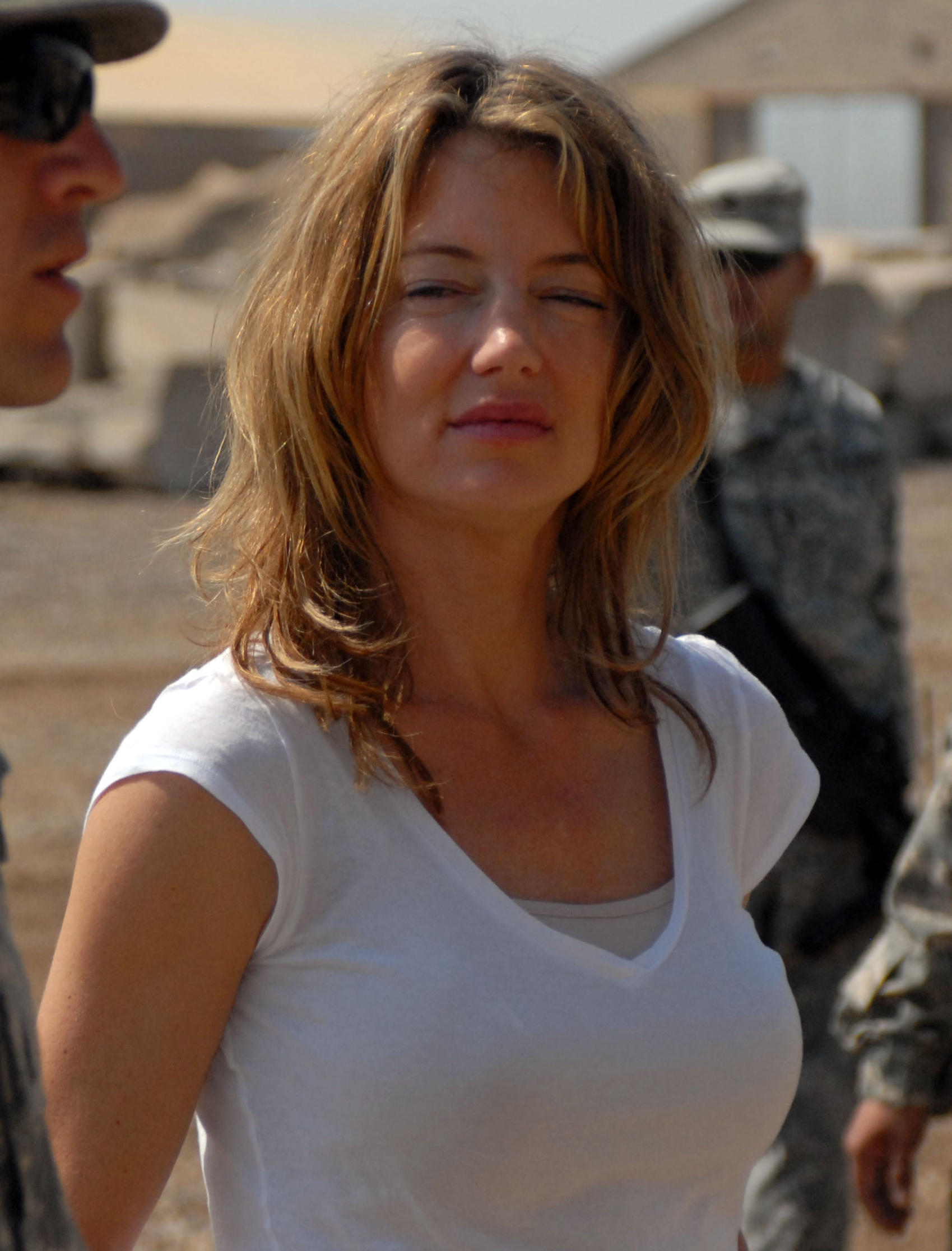
Cynthia Watros was cast as Nina in April 2019, stating she received a phone call inquiring if she would be interested in returning to daytime. She assumed the role in June.

Though rumors rose of former The Young and the Restless actress Michelle Stafford being cast in the role in early 2014, the casting was not made public until Stafford's first airing on the show on May 1, 2014. Head writer Ron Carlivati spoke to Daytime Confidential about the big casting coup saying: "Look, bottom line, Michelle [Stafford] was so perfect for Nina, we never seriously considered any other role for her." About how the show kept Stafford's casting under the radar, Carlivati added: "GH has been on hiatus for the past two weeks and Michelle doesn't really start taping until we resume. But we realized that as soon as she did, the news would be out there long before her episodes began airing. It was actually Frank's idea to try to slip her into an earlier show that had already been written and shot, so we could take everyone by surprise. So he snuck her into the studio recently, at the end of the day, to tape the one scene you just saw. That was inserted after the fact. We've been sweating it out ever since that it would stay under wraps!" On March 30, 2019, it was reported that Stafford had been re-hired at The Young and the Restless, and would be vacating the role of Nina. Stafford made her last appearance in the role on June 12, 2019.

Following news of Stafford's exit, it was announced that Cynthia Watros had been cast in the role; she made her first appearance on June 17, 2019.

=== Storylines ===
Nina is first mentioned as the comatose wife of Silas Clay in early 2014. He believes that Nina overdosed when she found out about his affair with Ava Jerome, and has been in a coma for 20 years. However, Nina's brother, Detective Nathan West, believes Silas tried to kill her, and investigates the case. He finds out that it was actually Nina's mother Madeline Reeves, who tried to kill Nina, because Nina was pregnant with Silas' child. She wanted to get rid of Nina's baby, and accidentally put her own daughter in a coma. Madeline tells Nathan that Nina has died, but later says that she only had Nina declared dead to get the inheritance that was left to Nina by Madeline's late husband.

Nina first appears onscreen in May 2014, waking up from her coma. Roughly a month later, Nina arrives in Port Charles, and shocks a bewildered Silas with her presence. Both Silas and Nathan are happy that she is alive, but Nina soon has to find out that much has changed. She is introduced to Kiki Jerome, Silas' daughter with Ava. Silas is also now dating Sam Morgan, despite Nina still showing an interest in him. After first not being aware that Silas and Sam are a couple, Nina claims to be fine with it; accepting the end of her marriage; and tells Silas that it would only be natural for his life to go on. However it is later revealed that Nina has been awake for longer than she says and that she trashed Silas' apartment a few months back. Nina in fact wants revenge on everyone that wronged her. Nina married Ric Lansing on May 18, 2015.

In November 2015, Nina goes to Julian Jerome, who owns Crimson magazine under his media empire, for a job. She ends up getting the job of editor-in-chief since the former had left the magazine. She works closely with Maxie Jones. When Nina and Maxie need someone to take pictures for the Nutcracker Gala, Maxie has an idea that Dillon Quartermaine (Robert Palmer Watkins) should stay in town, work for Nina, and take pictures of everyone at the Gala. In October 2018, a DNA test is arranged by Valentin (James Patrick Stuart) and confirms that Sasha Gilmore is Nina's daughter; however, it is later revealed Valentin hired her to pretend to be her daughter. In January 2021, Nina discovers Nelle Benson (Chloe Lanier) is the daughter she gave birth to. In February 2021, after breaking up with Jax, she plans to form a relationship with her newfound grandson Wiley after Nelle's death.

In April 2022, it was revealed by Neil Byrne's brother Brendon that Nina not only gave birth to Nelle, but her fraternal twin sister Willow Tait (Katelyn MacMullen), who was sold at birth by Madeline and was given to Lorriane "Harmony" Miller (Inga Cadranel) and her husband Douglas Miller to raise and she was named Kali Miller.

=== Reception ===
In 2023, Charlie Mason from Soaps She Knows placed Nina 34th on his ranked list of General Hospital's 40+ Greatest Characters of All Time, commenting "Talk about carpe'ing the diem! After lingering in a coma for decades, the heiress made up for lost time by losing her marbles, stealing Ava Jerome's newborn and, ultimately, displacing Carly Corinthos from her spot in Sonny's bed."

== Carlos Rivera ==
Carlos Rivera
- General Hospital character
- Portrayed by: Jeffrey Vincent Parise
- Duration: 2013–16
- First appearance: September 19, 2013
- Last appearance: July 20, 2016
- Created by: Ron Carlivati
- Introduced by: Frank Valentini
In-universe information
- Other names: Carlos Francisco Rivera
- Occupation: Mobster
- Father: Javier Rivera
- Brothers: Joe Rivera
- Wife: Sabrina Santiago (2016)
- Sons: Teddy Rivera

Carlos Rivera, played by Jeffrey Vincent Parise, was introduced in September 2013. The casting was officially confirmed by Access Hollywood on August 28, 2013. Parise filmed his first scenes on August 27, 2013, and his first air date was slated for mid or late September 2013. Carlos is a man from Sabrina Santiago's past and his introduction causes trouble for Sabrina's romance with Patrick Drake. Carlos also has a connection to the Port Charles mafia. The character also has ties to the criminal world. On May 18, 2015, the character was killed off and his departure was officially confirmed by executive producer Frank Valentini.

Sabrina is shocked by Carlos's arrival and he immediately wants to rekindle their romance. Though she rejects him, Carlos plants seeds of doubt in her about Patrick's devotion because he is still wearing his wedding ring. Carlos is eventually revealed to be the mob enforcer for Julian Jerome. Days before Patrick and Sabrina's wedding, Carlos sees Robin Scorpio, Patrick's presumed dead wife and Sonny's presumed dead friend alive. He tells Sabrina, but she refuses to believe him. Carlos is later kidnapped by rival mob boss Sonny Corinthos, and lies about claiming to be the brother of Sonny's late Lily (Lilly Melgar) hoping it will keep him alive. However, it is revealed that Carlos is lying, but before Sonny's henchman, Shawn Butler can kill him, Carlos escapes with help from TJ Ashford. Carlos is shot during a shootout, and makes his way to Sabrina's. When Sabrina learns she is pregnant, Carlos claims to be the father despite knowing the child is Patrick's. Sabrina tells the truth to Patrick about him being the child's father and not Carlos. Carlos is then arrested for the murder of AJ Quartermaine. Ava Jerome visits him and threatens him if he babbles the truth about AJ then she will hurt Sabrina. So for Sabrina's sake, he pleads guilty. When Sabrina visits him in jail, he lies to her that he killed AJ and that he was lying to her all this time. Unable to bear the pain, Sabrina leaves. Months later, Sabrina visits Carlos in jail to fill him in on how she found out the truth, indicating that she is no longer upset with him. In May 2015, Carlos kills Duke Lavery by delivering a fatal gunshot wound to his abdomen. In retaliation, Carlos is killed by Anna Devane on the docks of the Port Charles Harbor. In late November 2015, Carlos shows up at Sabrina's door. Apparently, Rivera had not died. He sees that Sabrina is pregnant and thinks the baby is his. At first she denies it, but when he overhears a private conversation between Felix and her, he realizes that the baby is his and not the child of Michael Corinthos, Sabrina's boyfriend. Sabrina still wants to keep the secret, feeling Carlos is dangerous to be around. However, when Michael finds out the truth, he leaves Sabrina, and she decides to go on the run with Carlos. Their son is born while they are fugitives, and they run with the help of Paul Hornsby. Carlos is found by Sonny and Anna in Colombia, and they bring him back to Port Charles to stand trial for murdering Duke. However, Carlos threatens Paul to help him escape. Carlos manages to escape from the prisoner transport van, and calls Julian for help to find a way out of town. Julian, though, stabs Carlos and throws him into the harbor. He is found by Michael, who brings him to the hospital, where Carlos succumbs to his injuries.

== Aaron Roland ==
Aaron Roland
- General Hospital character
- Portrayed by: John DeLuca
- Duration: 2016
- First appearance: April 27, 2016
- Last appearance: August 11, 2016
- Created by: Shelly Altman and Jean Passanante
In-universe information
- Occupation: Manager of Perks Coffee (2016–)

Aaron Roland, played by John DeLuca, was introduced in April 2016 and departed in August 2016. His casting was announced on April 4, 2016.

== Winston Rudge ==
Winston Rudge
- General Hospital character
- Portrayed by: David S. Lee
- Duration: 2016–2017, 2020–
- First appearance: December 14, 2016
- Created by: Jean Passanante and Shelly Altman
- Introduced by: Frank Valentini
In-universe information
- Occupation: Mobster henchman Casino manager

Winston Rudge is a fictional character on the ABC soap opera, General Hospital.

=== Casting ===
David S. Lee portrayed Winston Rudge from December 14, 2016, until August 23, 2017. He returned on September 15, 2020.

=== Storylines ===
==== 2016–2017 ====
Rudge is visited by Jason Morgan (Billy Miller) and Curtis Ashford (Donnell Turner) at his pawn shop. Jason and Curtis showed Rudge a photo of Julian Jerome and a couple other guys and asked if he knew anyone in the photos. Rudge claimed that he did not know any of them but he did recognize a Chinese restaurant bag that they had. Rudge claimed that he is into recycling and that they were free. Curtis wondered if the tools used by a homeless man came from the shop and put into one of the Chinese bags and Rudge said that it is possible, but he gives them out all the time.

Rudge went into a secret room where a mysterious person was watching the interaction over the monitor. On January 17, it was revealed that Rudge was working for Olivia Jerome (Tonja Walker), Julian's (William deVry) not-so-dead sister. On February 24, Rudge spiked Laura Spencer's (Genie Francis) coffee and kidnapped her under Olivia's orders. He tried to kill Julian by smothering him with a pillow, but failed to do so.

On August 23, Rudge was later called to the stand at Julian's trial. He lied about Julian and claimed that Julian willingly did what his sister said to do.

==== 2020 ====
Rudge shows up in Monte Carlo in September 2020, as a manager of a casino that Robert Scorpio (Tristan Rogers) and Olivia Quartermaine (Lisa LoCicero) are at while Scorpio is looking for Holly Sutton-Scorpio (Emma Samms), whom he suspects may have been located, despite being believed to be dead.

== Joe Scully, Jr. ==
Joe Scully, Jr.
- General Hospital character
- Portrayed by: Richard Steinmetz
- First appearance: July 2, 2012
- Last appearance: October 23, 2012
- Created by: Ron Carlivati
- Introduced by: Frank Valentini
In-universe information
- Other names: Joseph Mitchell Scully, Jr.
- Occupation: Antique shop owner; Mobster
- Parents: Joe Scully; Marie Scully
- Sons: Trey Mitchell

Joe Scully, Jr. is a fictional character from the ABC Daytime soap opera General Hospital. The character was portrayed by soap opera veteran Richard Steinmetz, who made his first appearance on July 2, 2012.

=== Casting ===
On May 24, 2012, Soap Opera Digest reported that Steinmetz, who was best known for his portrayal of Martin Fitzgerald on Passions, had signed on to play a new role within the series. According to executive producer Frank Valentini, Steinmetz's character would be the son of a past character and have a big story with Port Charles mob kingpin, Sonny Corinthos (Maurice Benard). In the July 9, 2012, issue of Soap Opera Digest, it was confirmed Steinmetz would portray Joe Scully Jr. and would premiere the week of July 2, 2012.

=== Backstory ===
According to Sonny Corinthos, Joe Scully Jr. is a bully and always depends on his father to protect him from the trouble he stirs up. When Joe starts interfering with his father's business, Scully sends him to run a strip club in Atlantic City called the Sea Breeze. Joe also develops an infatuation with one of the dancers, Theresa, who is not interested in him. Meanwhile, Scully realizes Joe is not capable of running the club and sends Sonny to Atlantic City to take over. Theresa, afraid of Joe, goes to Sonny for help. Joe gets the wrong idea, believing she and Sonny are having an affair. One night, an angry Joe shoots Theresa in cold blood in front of Sonny; he then panics and Scully rushes him out of town. It is later revealed that years prior, Joe had raped Sonny's girlfriend, Kate Howard, then known as Connie Falconeri.

=== Storyline ===
Joe first appears on-screen in July 2012, during a phone conversation with his son, Trey, and it is revealed that he is behind the reality show Mob Princess. While working at his antique shop in New Orleans, Joe is confronted by a gun wielding John McBain before Joe has his goons knock him out and tie him up. Joe is interrupted by Jason Morgan who delivers him to Sonny. Sonny tries to get Joe to confess to raping Kate, but Joe claims she came onto him. As Sonny is about to kill him, McBain interrupts. Soon after it is revealed that Joe is working for Jerry Jacks, who poisons the water of Port Charles. Joe has a vial of antidote from Jerry, but gives it to Tracy Quartermaine, with whom he has become romantically involved. After Jerry is presumed dead, Joe is seen working with Duke Lavery, later revealed to be Cesar Faison in disguise. Joe dies on October 23, 2012, in a shoot out with Jason.

== Pat Spencer ==
Pat Spencer
- General Hospital character
- Portrayed by: Dee Wallace; Chloe Lanier (2015; young Pat)
- First appearance: March 30, 2015
- Last appearance: July 23, 2015
- Created by: Ron Carlivati (Note: The announcement of Luke and Bobbie's sister was shown in 1978, under executive producer Gloria Monty and head writer Douglas Marland. The character was later developed and introduced under executive producer, Frank Valentini and head writer, Ron Carlivati.)
- Introduced by: Frank Valentini
In-universe information
- Family: Spencer
- Parents: Tim Spencer; Lena Eckert
- Brothers: Luke Spencer
- Sisters: Bobbie Spencer
- Daughters: Valerie Spencer
- Grandmothers: Beatrice Eckert
- Uncles: Fred Eckert
- Aunts: Ruby Anderson
- Nephews: Lucky Spencer; Ethan Lovett; Lucas Jones (adoptive)
- Nieces: Carly Corinthos; Lulu Spencer Falconeri; B. J. Jones (adoptive)
- First cousins: Bill Eckert; Jenny Eckert

Patricia "Pat" Spencer, played by Dee Wallace—known for her appearance in the 1982 Steven Spielberg film E.T. the Extra-Terrestrial—is the older sister of Luke Spencer (Anthony Geary) and Bobbie Spencer (Jacklyn Zeman). Wallace's casting was officially announced on March 6, 2015. In an interview with Soap Opera Digest, Wallace said what piqued her interest the most was that she had never done a soap before. Wallace's late husband Christopher Stone had appeared on Days of Our Lives as Bill Horton and the work load initially scared him. However, he later told her it was one of the most enjoyable experiences of his career. Also, Wallace's agent told her how "pivotal" the role was and also told Wallace she would be working opposite Anthony Geary. However, Wallace was nervous when she realized how much work she had coming her way. "Seriously, when I got the first script, I thought 'Oh, my gosh, maybe it's not too late for me to get out!' I was scared!" Wallace said. However, Wallace praised Geary, executive producer Frank Valentini and casting director Mark Teschner for making her feel welcome and comfortable on the set. Actress Chloe Lanier portrayed a young Pat on April 1, 2015, and July 23, 2015.

=== Storylines ===
Not much is known about Pat. She was briefly mentioned to Bobbie by their old neighbor Ms. Middleton in 1978. Pat's dresses were cut down by their mother so that they would fit little Bobbie. Pat was last mentioned in 1983. Pat is not mentioned again until early 2015 when a deranged Luke discusses her with their cousin Bill's corpse imagining he is speaking with himself. Luke admits that he has not thought of Pat in decades. When the family realizes Luke has suffered a severe psychotic break due to some childhood trauma, Bobbie assumes Pat would be old enough to remember what happened to Luke because she is too young. In February 2015, Luke's daughter Lulu (Emme Rylan) and his wife Tracy Quartermaine (Jane Elliot) get news of an address for Pat. In March, Pat's daughter, Valerie (Brytni Sarpy) claims Pat is dead. On April 2, 2015, Pat dies after being reunited with her siblings after 52 years. In July 2015, the spirit of a young Pat reappeared to Luke, convincing her brother not to kill himself and to her daughter Valerie one last time.

== Suzanne Stanwyck ==
Suzanne Stanwyck
- General Hospital character
- Portrayed by: Adrienne Barbeau
- Duration: 2010–11
- First appearance: August 12, 2010
- Last appearance: May 17, 2011
- Created by: Robert Guza, Jr.
- Introduced by: Jill Farren Phelps
In-universe information
- Other names: Stephanie Wayne
- Husband: Theo Hoffman (1976–2011)
- Sons: Aleksander Janácek
- Grandsons: Alec Barrett

Suzanne Stanwycke, portrayed by Adrienne Barbeau, was introduced on August 12, 2010, as the longtime friend and business associate to Brenda Barrett (Vanessa Marcil). Barbeau made her final appearance on May 17, 2011. Barbeau is best known for her portrayal of Carol Traynor the hit 1970s sitcom, Maude.

=== Casting ===
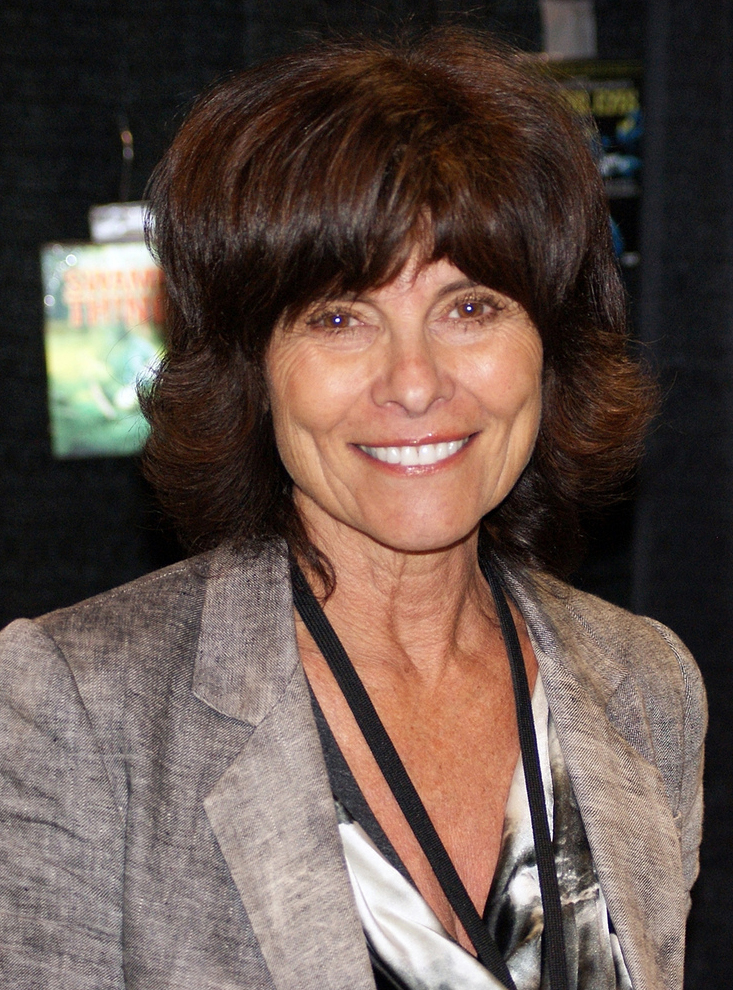
Adrienne Barbeau plays Stanwycke.

In late May 2010, General Hospital released a casting call for the short term role of Suzanne Stanwycke. Unlike most casting calls, the character's name did not change once Barbeau was hired. The casting was announced by Michael Logan of TV Guide on June 24, 2010. Barbeau revealed that General Hospital contacted her agents to offer her the role, "out of the blue." However, Barbeau's status depended on fans response to the character. The role was initially supposed to be about a month-long stint, but it later became "open ended." On April 12, 2011, Barbeau announced her departure from the series through Twitter. However, set insiders claimed that Barbeau could likely return to the series.

=== Development ===
"Suzanne was a journalist, someone like Christiane Amanpour, but in print primarily. She is not well known. She was so disheartened by what she was seeing in her travels as a journalist that she decided to start this charity organization to help exploited children."

— Adrienne Barbeau on Suzanne's past.

The initial casting call described Suzanne as being in her 50s. Suzanne is "tough, funny, no-nonsense with a heart of gold." Suzanne does not have patience for "BS" and has spent majority of her life fighting for children's rights. TV Guide described Suzanne as a "tough-as-nails broad." Suzanne runs the Alliance to Save Exploited Children (ASEC) in Italy. Suzanne has worked closely with supermodel Brenda Barrett for years. "Despite her hard ege," Suzanne has a lot of love to give, and she loves Brenda very much. Guza described her as Brenda's "confidante." According to Guza, the character has a "surprising feminine side." Both Guza and Barbeau hinted that Suzanne could find romance, and Barbeau joked about her attraction to Steve Burton's Jason. Barbeau developed majority of Suzanne's backstory which is hinted at on August 20, 2010, when she lectures Brenda about mob violence. However, Barbeau said that if the opportunity presented itself, she would make adjustments to the script to portray Suzanne's past in the way she has already developed it. Barbeau said Suzanne reminds her of herself. "My kind of ballsy, take-no-prisoners babe," Barbeau said of her character. When it comes to Suzanne's friendship with Brenda, she needs a face to bring attention to her cause at ASEC, and Brenda is kind of like her Angelina Jolie. In February 2011, Suzanne is revealed to be the wife of Theo Hoffman (Daniel Benzali) who secretly operating as European crime figure, The Balkan. Suzanne and Theo are blame Brenda for her part in their son, Aleksander's murder. Barbeau told TV Guide that she was not made aware of her character's true identity and intentions with Brenda until shortly before Benzali's debut as Theo in December 2010. Like her co-stars, Barbeau was shocked by the plot twist and immediately questioned the direction of the storyline; "How do I justify all of Suzanne's behavior up until now?" she asked. However, Barbeau was relieved that she did not know of Suzanne's true identity immediately because it would have made it more challenging to play the character. Guza and Barbeau retraced Suzanne's steps on the shot in an effort to make sure that the revelation would come across as "believable and explainable." According to the actress, Suzanne's motivations have changed since the beginning. Initially, Suzanne just wants the truth about her son. Because Barbeau is so dedicated to her cause as a child advocate, it makes the reveal all the more shocking. When questioned about the possibility of her character's future on the show, Barbeau said that even though Theo and Suzanne are married, they do not have the same agenda. When the character was written out of the series, some speculated that Barbeau could reprise the role to facilitate Marcil's departure later that year.

=== Storylines ===
Suzanne contacts Jason Morgan to help protect Brenda from European crime lord, The Balkan. Jason convinces the women to come to Port Charles to make the process easier, but Suzanne disapproves when Brenda rekindles her romance with and becomes engaged to her former flame, Sonny Corinthos (Maurice Benard). Suzanne goes to extremes to stall the wedding, including flooding the venue and destroying Brenda's wedding gown. Sonny and Brenda confront Suzanne about her schemes and she claims she is worried Sonny's enemies will target Brenda. It is then revealed that Suzanne is actually married to the Balkan, aka Theo Hoffman. The duo want Brenda to answer for their son, Aleksander's death in 2007. After Theo kidnaps Brenda with the help of Shawn Butler (Sean Blakemore), it is revealed that Brenda gave birth to Aleksander's stillborn son with Suzanne by her side. Theo immediately assumes the child lived as it was Suzanne who witnessed the birth. Though denying Theo's accusations, she harbors resentment toward her husband for allowing their son into the criminal life. During Theo's search for their grandson, Suzanne kills him. Suzanne continues to raise her grandson in secret, but to keep Brenda and Sonny from finding him, she presents Brenda with another little boy named Lucian, and pretends he is the child. When Sonny demands a DNA test, Suzanne kidnaps the boy and skips town. Fortunately, Suzanne is found in San Antonio with Brenda's biological son, Alec. Brenda meets her son, and Suzanne is arrested.

=== Reception ===
Michael Logan said, "If you can hold your own against Maude, those mobsters in Port Charles should be a cinch!" Logan also praised the character's name as "best soap name ever!" Logan said the character would make a good match for Anthony Geary's Luke Spencer. On Soaps She Knows, fans hoped for Barbeau's pairing with Geary, while some also voted for a potential pairing with Tristan Rogers's Robert Scorpio. TV Guide described Suzanne's reveal as The Balkan's wife as a "jaw-dropper" and "stunning revelation."

== Willow Tait ==
Willow Tait
- General Hospital character
- Portrayed by: Katelyn MacMullen
- Duration: 2018–present
- First appearance: October 18, 2018
- Created by: Shelly Altman and Chris Van Etten
- Introduced by: Frank Valentini
In-universe information
- Other names: Kali Miller; Willow Corinthos; Willow Chase
- Occupation: Student; Tutor at General Hospital; Waitress; Teacher at PC Elementary; Congressperson (since 2026)
- Father: Silas Clay
- Mother: Nina Reeves
- Adoptive father: Douglas Miller
- Adoptive mother: Harmony Miller
- Sisters: Nelle Benson
- Half-sisters: Kiki Jerome
- Spouse: Michael Corinthos (2020–2021, 2023–2025); Harrison Chase (2021); Drew Cain (2025–2026)
- Children: Jonah Corinthos; Ameila Corinthos
- Adoptive sons: Wiley Cooper-Jones
- Grandparents: Madeline Reeves
- Aunts and uncles: Stephen Clay; Nathan West (adoptive)
- Nieces and nephews: Wiley Cooper-Jones
- First cousins: Rafe Kovich, Jr.; James West (adoptive)
- Other relatives: Liesl Obrecht; Britt Westbourne; Nathan West

Willow Tait, portrayed by Katelyn MacMullen, made her first appearance on October 18, 2018.

=== Storylines ===
In October 2018, Willow Tait is introduced as a teacher at Port Charles Elementary, where she meets with Franco Baldwin and Elizabeth Webber, after Elizabeth's son Aiden begins acting distant at school.

Willow later meets Michael Corinthos in a bereavement group and the two bond over their shared losses but however she begins a relationship with Harrison Chase. It is later revealed that Willow was once a member of a cult called Dawn of Day and was once involved in a relationship with the evil cult leader, Shiloh Archer. When Shiloh shows up in Port Charles, Willow, Michael, Chase and Michael's family rally together to protect not only Willow but also Michael's younger sister, Kristina Corinthos-Davis who recently became a member of Dawn of Day.

After Chase and Sasha have an alleged affair and learning about the true identity of Wiley Corinthos, a heartbroken Willow enters a marriage of convenience with Michael to help him win custody of his son, Wiley. Months later, Michael and Willow later fall in love and then begin a real marriage together. Their marriage is short-lived and later they get an annulment and return to their respective partners. However, Willow and Michael still have a lingering feelings which culminates into the two having an affair while Willow is married to Chase who was thought to have a terminal illness. After divorcing Chase, Willow and Michael get remarried and together from this union, the two welcomed a daughter, Amelia Grace Corinthos.

== Ellie Trout ==
Ellie Trout
- General Hospital character
- Portrayed by: Emily Wilson
- Duration: 2012–2016, 2022
- First appearance: September 14, 2012
- Last appearance: December 23, 2022
- Created by: Ron Carlivati
- Introduced by: Frank Valentini
In-universe information
- Other names: Ellen Trout
- Occupation: Lab technician
- Aunts: Ellen

Ellie Trout is a fictional character from the ABC Daytime soap opera General Hospital. She first appeared on September 14, 2012, portrayed by Emily Wilson. The anticipated airdate was confused by some with that of Teresa Castillo's role as Sabrina Santiago, who then appeared September 19. A representative of the show later confirmed that Wilson had joined the cast on a recurring basis. On December 12, 2013, it was announced that Wilson, as well as Bradford Anderson, would exit the series. Wilson came back in 2014 and 2015.

=== Storylines ===
Ellie Trout first appears in September 2012 when Damian Spinelli convinces her to run a DNA test on Sam Morgan's deceased infant son, ultimately helping in reuniting Sam with her real son, Daniel Morgan. Spinelli and Ellie eventually begin dating, making Maxie Jones, Spinelli's ex-girlfriend and Ellie's new roommate, jealous. Maxie asks Spinelli to resume their relationship and he declines, choosing Ellie. Ellie finds out about Spinelli and Maxie, and asks Spinelli if he still loves her, but he proclaims that he is chosen Ellie. On Christmas Eve, Spinelli invites Ellie over to his employer, Sonny Corinthos' house for dinner. Spinelli leaves, though, when Maxie calls him and leaves Ellie there alone. Upset, she breaks up with him when he returns. Spinelli says he wants to make it up to her, telling her if Ellie still wants him, meet him on the hospital rooftop on New Year's Eve. Ellie initially does not plan to, but Maxie changes her mind and she goes. Ellie's car breaks down and she is hit by Connie Falconeri's car while receiving a call from Spinelli. When she did not show up at midnight, he believed she had dumped him. He then had sex with Maxie while Ellie was rushed to the hospital, severely injured. Spinelli found out the truth, and stayed with Ellie. Ellie found out about Maxie and Spinelli, but she later forgave him. However, she later finds out that Maxie became pregnant with Spinelli's child as a result. Maxie tries to pass the baby off as the child of Lulu and Dante Falconeri, after miscarrying as their surrogate. Ellie initially keeps this secret, but tells Spinelli the truth after the baby is born. Dante and Lulu find out the truth, as well, and Maxie, Spinelli, Lulu, and Dante go to court to fight for custody. Spinelli eventually gains sole custody of his daughter, Georgie. Ellie gets a job offer in Portland, and Spinelli considers moving with her. After talking with Maxie, Spinelli decides to make the move, and she leaves with Spinelli and Georgie soon afterwards.

== Maya Ward ==
Maya Ward
- General Hospital character
- Portrayed by: Annie Ilonzeh
- Duration: 2010–2011
- First appearance: March 31, 2010
- Last appearance: June 8, 2011
- Created by: Robert Guza, Jr.
- Introduced by: Jill Farren Phelps
In-universe information
- Occupation: Medical intern
- Family: Quartermaine
- Mother: Faith Ward
- Half-sisters: Zoe Richardson
- Husband: Ethan Lovett (2010–2011)
- Grandparents: Bradley Ward; Isobel Ward
- Uncles: Justus Ward
- Other relatives: Edward Quartermaine; Tracy Quartermaine; Brook Lynn Ashton; Michael Corinthos

Maya Ward, played by Annie Ilonzeh, was introduced in 2010 as the great-granddaughter of Edward Quartermaine (John Ingle) and the beloved Mary Mae Ward (Rosalind Cash). Ilonzeh originated the role of March 31, 2010, as a series regular. The character was written out on June 8, 2011.

On January 20, 2010, Edward Quartermaine arrives home with a letter from his great-granddaughter, Maya, who has recently lost her stepmother in a car accident and is left as the guardian of her little sister, Zoe Richardson. Maya is in her last year of medical school and looking for a place to do her internship. Edward invites her to live at the mansion. On March 31, Maya is first seen when she gets into a car accident with Ethan Lovett. Maya finally arrives at the Quartermaine Mansion and meets her family members. At the hospital, she impresses the chief of staff, Dr. Steve Webber, who hires her as an intern.

Maya continues to bump heads with Ethan. On July 14, she opens up to him, revealing her former boyfriend had died from a gunshot wound while she was working the Emergency Room rotation. Soon after, Ethan is shot in the hospital by Warren Bauer, and Maya freezes, unable to assist him. After months of flirting, Maya and Ethan start dating. Ethan asks Maya for help in getting his father Luke Spencer back together with Tracy Quartermaine. Luke fakes a heart attack, and Maya forges his test results. Tracy discovers what is going on, but Luke convinces her to go to Las Vegas with him, along with Maya and Ethan as chaperones. In November 2010, the four wake up with hangovers in a Las Vegas hotel room. Luke reveals a marriage certificate thinking it is his and Tracy's. After reading the document aloud, it turns out Maya and Ethan are the ones who married. They chose to wait on an annulment and enjoy the perks of marriage. Upon their return to Port Charles, Maya's great-grandfather Edward offers them $1 million to stay married for one year.

That spring, Maya leaves town to take care of some business within the Ward family. On June 6, 2011, Ethan visited Maya in Philadelphia, PA. He discovered her in bed with another man. She later told Ethan she had been lying to him for a while and had no plans to return to Port Charles. Afterwards, Ethan and Maya decided the marriage was over and parted amicably.

In November 2012, following Edward's death, Maya inherits 6% of his ELQ shares.

== Maggie Wurth ==
Maggie Wurth
- General Hospital character
- Portrayed by: Kodi Kitchen
- Duration: 2011–12
- First appearance: November 10, 2011
- Last appearance: May 11, 2012
- Created by: Garin Wolf
- Introduced by: Jill Farren Phelps
In-universe information
- Occupation: Pediatrician

Margaret "Maggie" Wurth is a fictional character on the ABC Daytime soap opera General Hospital. She was portrayed by Kodi Kitchen from November 10, 2011, to May 11, 2012.

Pediatrician Maggie Wurth arrives in Port Charles from Memphis in November 2011, wearing a clown mask around the hospital on Halloween. Maggie has been summoned to town by her former lover Steven Webber to take a job at General Hospital. Maggie flirts with Steve but he tells her he is seeing Olivia Falconeri. When Aiden Spencer becomes ill with Idiopathic thrombocytopenic purpura, Maggie treats him. Soon after, Maggie and Steve find out the hospital in Memphis is investigating a mysterious case they were involved in. Olivia begin to wonder what secret Maggie and Steve are keeping. Maggie tells Olivia that they are having an affair, but Steve decides to tell Olivia what happened; he had killed a prisoner patient in a coma in order to save a little girl who needed a transplant. On May 1, Maggie is murdered by Steve's mother Heather Webber when she spikes her tea with poison, and is also framed for the death of the prisoner when Heather forges a suicide letter from Maggie that said that she was responsible for the patient's death. In July 2012, Commissioner Anna Devane and officer Dante Falconeri, Olivia's son, figure out Heather killed Maggie when they track down the forger Heather hired. Heather is arrested soon after and charged with Maggie's murder.
