= Chloe Lanier =

American actress

- Occupation: Actress
- Years active: 2009–present

Chloe Lanier is an American actress. She is best known for her role on the ABC soap opera General Hospital as the villainous Nelle Benson. For her portrayal, Lanier was nominated for three consecutive Daytime Emmy Awards for Outstanding Younger Actress in a Drama Series, winning in 2018.

== Career ==
Lanier began her career in 2009 when she starred as Lisa in the movie The Effects of Tragedy. She later joined the cast of Army Wives in 2012 in the recurring role of Penny. In 2014, she guest-starred in an episode of NCIS as Emma Carter and appeared in the film North Blvd as Young Elaine.

In 2015, she appeared in two episodes of General Hospital as Young Patricia Spencer for the 52nd anniversary storyline. Lanier described her audition for the role as being very secretive. Listed as "Girl No.2,” she initially thought it was a background role. After reading the character’s description, she was impressed which led to a change of heart. She decided to go for it after being further convinced by her boyfriend. In the same year, she guest-starred in Stalker as Sage.

When General Hospital was initially planning to cast the role of Nelle Benson, Lanier was busy appearing as Chelsea on Kingdom. However, because Laura Wright (Carly Corinthos) and Executive Producer Frank Valentini were adamant that if anyone should play Nelle, it should be Lanier, the storyline was put on hold for her until she became available. Lanier later revealed to Soap Opera Digest that Frank Valentini had called her personally and convinced her to accept the role. She returned to General Hospital in 2016, this time in the contract role of Nelle Hayes [Benson]. Her first episode as Nelle aired on August 8, 2016.

In November 2016, she worked on the independent film, Gorman, also titled Quail Lake, where she played the lead role of Brittany.

Lanier departed the contract role as Nelle Benson on General Hospital in August 2018, but made several guest appearances later that year. She again reprised the role of Nelle the week of June 10, 2019 and was on a recurring status with the soap following that reprisal, appearing intermittently through September 2020. She returned again to briefly reprise Nelle in September 2022.

== Personal life ==
In March 2020, it was reported that she had symptoms of COVID-19, but was unable to get tested due to the limited availability.

== Filmography ==
=== Film ===
Year	Title	Role	Notes
2009	The Effects of Butterfly	Lisa	
2014	North Blvd	Young Elaine	
2019	Quail Lake	Brittany	

=== Television ===
Year	Title	Role	Notes
2012	GCB	Ice Cream Vendor	Episode: Pilot; Uncredited
2012–2013	Army Wives	Penny	Recurring role (seasons 6–7)
2014	NCIS	Emma Carter	Episode: "Shooter"
2015	Stalker	Sage	Episode: "Lost and Found"
2015	General Hospital	Patricia Spencer	2 episodes
2016	Kingdom	Chelsea	3 episodes
2016–2018, 2018–2020, 2022	General Hospital	Nelle Benson	Contract (2016–2018); Recurring (2018–2020); Guest star (2022)
2021	NCIS: Hawai'i	Kayla Barlow	Episode: "The Tourist"
2022	9-1-1	Deena	Episode: "Starting Over"
2023	Station 19	Clara	Episode: "Even Better Than the Real Thing"
2024	Law & Order	Chelsea Shell	Episode: "No Good Deed"
2026	I Am Mary Jo Buttafuoco	Mary Jo Buttafuoco	Television film

== Awards and nominations ==
Year	Award	Category	Work	Result	Ref.
2017	Daytime Emmy Awards	Outstanding Younger Actress in a Drama Series	General Hospital	Nominated	
2018	Daytime Emmy Awards	Outstanding Younger Actress in a Drama Series	General Hospital	Won	
2019	Daytime Emmy Awards	Outstanding Younger Actress in a Drama Series	General Hospital	Nominated	
