= Shawn Butler =

Fictional character from General Hospital

- General Hospital character
- Portrayed by: Sean Blakemore
- Duration: 2011–2016; 2021–2022
- First appearance: January 24, 2011
- Last appearance: March 21, 2022
- Created by: Robert Guza, Jr.
- Introduced by: Jill Farren Phelps (2011); Frank Valentini (2015, 2021)
In-universe information
- Occupation: Newspaper magnate; Coffee importer; Manager of Kelly's Diner; Mob enforcer; University professor; U.S. Marine Veteran
- Father: Ray Butler
- Sons: TJ Ashford
- Grandchildren: Irene Davis-Ashford

Shawn Butler is a fictional character from the ABC soap opera General Hospital. The role is portrayed by actor Sean Blakemore and first appeared on January 24, 2011, on a recurring basis. On April 6, 2011, it was announced that Blakemore was put on contract with the series. On May 18, 2015, it was announced that Blakemore had taped his last scenes as Shawn and would be exiting the series. Butler returned for one day on November 19, 2015. Butler was visited by Sam and Jason Morgan in early April 2016.

== Casting and characterization ==
Actor Sean Blakemore, known for his small roles on soap operas such as Days of Our Lives and The Young and the Restless, originated the role of Shawn Butler on January 24, 2011, on a recurring basis. In April, it was reported that Blakemore had signed a contract with the series. When Blakemore started to appear less frequently in February 2012, many fans were led to believe Blakemore had been left go. It was later confirmed that Blakemore had taken some time off to shoot a movie.

During an interview with BE Magazine in October 2011, Blakemore discusses his character. He describes Shawn as someone with professional skills, but also a man with a lot of personal issues. Blakemore also states,

He is a bad boy turned good. He finds it hard to try to win over people who he comes in contact with, as far as trying to prove himself to them considering his past.

—Blakemore BE Interview

In May 2015, Blakemore announced his exit from the role, exiting during the May 29 episode. In November of the same year and April 2016, he made brief guest appearances.

On April 1, 2021, it was announced Blakemore had agreed to reprise the role; he returned during the final moments of the April 21 episode. In February of the following year, Blakemore announced his exit from the role, citing "other obligations."

== Character development ==
Blakemore has complimented the writers of the series for his character's careful introduction. "He was hired [to kidnap Brenda], but it was brilliant how they introduced him with Molly. You could see Shawn for who he was. He worked for the wrong side but he had ethics. He came to Port Charles to shake it up but after meeting Molly, it was his life that was shaken up," Blakemore stated.

After a casting call was put out for an African-American teenager, there was some speculation that the role was going to be introduced as Shawn's son. This led to rumors that Shawn's family life was going to be explored, and more of his backstory would be revealed. The role was revealed to be T.J., the son of the Marine that Shawn had accidentally killed in the war. T.J., portrayed by Krys Meyer first appeared on January 17, 2012. When T.J. started to date Molly Lansing, there was much speculation that Shawn would become involved with Molly's mother, Alexis Davis (Nancy Lee Grahn).

During the summer of 2012, it was confirmed that Shawn was going to be paired with Alexis romantically. Grahn said of the pairing "I love working with Sean Blakemore. I think he's very cool. His character needs to be more dimensionalized, but I'm all for putting Shawn and Alexis together. Frank and [head writer] Ron Carlivati know that I need to have a relationship on the show. Maybe they're just experimenting, seeing what works, what doesn't. It'd be good to start over with Alexis and Shawn and approach this thing again. Why are the two of them together? What's behind the attraction? I don't think they even know each other."

== Storylines ==
=== Backstory ===
Shawn Butler was born and raised in Detroit, Michigan. As a kid, Shawn admires his father Granigan. One night when Shawn is six years old, he and Ray go to store to buy some pants, and Shawn watches as his father is gunned down. Shawn is a former U. S. Marine and suffers from post-traumatic stress disorder; he also worked as Master Chef before enlisting in the marines. While stationed in Afghanistan, Shawn befriends fellow soldier Mo. Shawn is devastated when he accidentally kills Mo during a friendly fire incident. Shawn began suffering from PTSD when he accidentally injured a young girl in Afghanistan. Shawn's mother is deceased.

=== 2011–2016 ===
Shawn Butler first appears in January 2011, comforting Molly Lansing who is suffering from post-traumatic stress disorder after shooting Jerry Jacks. Shawn opens up about his own PTSD struggles and he helps her deal. Molly's aunt, Carly Corinthos Jacks later shows her gratitude by offering him a room at her hotel, which he declines. It is soon revealed that Shawn is working for Theo Hoffman, who is secretly operating as The Balkan, an international crime lord. On Theo's orders, Shawn is sent to kidnap Brenda Barrett on February 18, just before her wedding. However, several visitors get in his way and Shawn can't get to Brenda. He is later confronted by Sam McCall and her boyfriend, Jason Morgan who convince him help bring down Theo. Theo realizes Shawn has betrayed him and attempts to kill him. Carly finds a wounded Shawn on the side of the road and helps him recover before he is nearly killed by Sonny Corinthos.

During Shawn's hospital stay, there is another attempt on his life. When serial killer, Franco begins menacing Carly and her daughter, Josslyn Jacks, Jason hires Shawn as bodyguard. When Carly's estranged husband, Jasper Jacks attempts to use Shawn's violent past against Carly during their custody hearing, Shawn quits. Shawn soon begins opening up about his past and family. In July 2011, after Jax is run out of town by Sonny, Shawn believing he'll be back begins paying more attention to Carly and her daughter. On August 8, Shawn attempts to stop Jax from leaving town with Josslyn, but his efforts are stalled when he has a PTSD attack. Shawn manages to get Josslyn back home before Jax leaves with assistance from Robin Scorpio. Shawn comforts Carly when Jax is presumed dead in a plane crash and he finds evidence that Jax is still alive. Shawn is later hired by Jason to take over his job temporarily while he is preparing to marry. Carly and Shawn continue to grow closer as he becomes more involved in the business when he protects Carly's son Michael from getting busted with drugs. However, Michael doesn't approve of his mother's and Shawn's budding relationship and even gets Sonny to fire him. In October 2011, after receiving a package from Franco, Carly and Shawn go to Hawaii to warn Jason who is on his honeymoon with new wife, Sam. They bond and ultimately share a kiss on October 27. In November 2011, on Veteran's Day, Shawn opens up to Carly about his friend and fellow marine Tommy Ashford whom he accidentally killed in Afghanistan and how his father was gunned down in front of him when he was a kid. Carly and Shawn spend Thanksgiving together at Kelly's but Shawn realizes they are getting too personal and pulls away. When Franco makes contact again, Shawn moves in with Carly temporarily to protect her and Josslyn. For Christmas, Carly gets Shawn a dog to help with his PTSD, whom he names Wilson.

In January 2012, as Shawn is preparing to leave Port Charles, he is forced to take in Tommy's trouble teenage son, T. J. Ashford, who has run away from home and has to stay. Carly hires him to manage Kelly's Diner. Shawn convinces Alexis Davis, Molly's mother to let Molly tutor T.J.. Shawn is jealous of Carly's new relationship with Johnny Zacchara and T.J. calls him out on his feelings for her. Shawn tries to convince Carly to officially divorce Jax when Jax sells his half of their hotel to Carly's rival, Kate Howard without telling her. In February 2012, Shawn and Michael find common ground when Michael decides to go to college and Shawn ends up being his tutor. Shawn asks to escort Carly to the General Hospital Pulmonary benefit at the Metro Court, but she doesn't return his call. After much probing from T.J., Shawn confronts Carly and tells her he wants to be with her. When she doesn't return his feelings, Shawn backs off. In April 2012, Renelle is attacked and Shawn brings her to the PCPD. In the summer, Shawn defends Molly and T.J. when is it discovered that they have been seeing one another in secret, and he convinces Alexis that their relationship won't really cause any trouble. Eventually, Shawn asks Alexis on a date and soon after the two become a couple. After the disappearance of Jason Morgan who was shot and killed by Cesar Faison, Shawn becomes an associate of Sonny. After a time Alexis and Shawn call it quits.

In mid to late 2013, he and Sonny are planning to take down Julian Jerome in which he and Ava Jerome were already rid of Jason.

On May 22, 2015, Jordan informed him that he is T.J.'s real father. On May 27, 2015 he pleaded guilty to shooting Hayden Barnes and was sent to prison because Shawn's attorney and Sonny's half-brother Ric Lansing couldn't refute the evidence. Hayden visits Shawn in prison about who shot her. In early April 2016, Sam and Jason Morgan visit Shawn in Pentonville to discuss Hayden Barnes' shooting in 2015 after the wedding disaster at the All Saints Church.

=== 2021–2022 ===
In April 2021, Shawn becomes Jason's cellmate in prison. On Carly's request, he stabs Jason, allowing Jason to escape while being treated at the hospital. He also becomes reacquainted with Alexis Davis who is now sentenced to Pentonville.

Shawn is released from Prison after TJ and Molly Lansing proved the sentencing Judge had a personal vendetta. Shawn then began a quest to make amends and find those responsible who sent him to prison.

== Reception ==
"the budding relationship between reformed mercenary Shawn Butler (Sean Blakemore) and resident bitch goddess Carly Corinthos Jacks (Laura Wright) proved to be one of the few rays of sunlight peeking through the darkness over Port Chuck."

— Daytime Confidential Top 10 Couples

Many fans and critics alike became interested in the potential of Shawn and Carly (Laura Wright). Then head writer, Robert Guza, Jr. began toying with the idea, even promoting an angle where Shawn and Carly fall for one another, with Jasper Jacks (Ingo Rademacher) standing by. However, due to Shawn's lack of storyline, many fans were against the pairing. But, what some fans like was that the story would be something new, and different from the characters Carly was usually paired with. When asked about the potential pairing, Wright revealed that she liked that the writers were playing them as the "Ross and Rachel" of daytime. When GH was appointed a new head writer, many believed the new blood, Garin Wolf would try something new; and Wolf appeared to be going in the direction. Wolf went ahead with the couple's first kiss on October 27, 2011 and caught the attention of many media outlets including, Entertainment Weekly. The pairing came in at No. 2 on Daytime Confidential's list of the Best Couples of 2011, saying that in the midst of rest of the stories being told at the time, which caused the ratings to dwindle, the potential pairing was the only one that showed promise. Yahoo! TV also praised the potential pairing citing chemistry between Blakemore and Wright as "undeniable" and they could potentially become a fan favorite couple; the article also said that Shawn was better than most of the men Carly had been previously paired with, most of whom were mobsters, with the exception of her estranged husband, Jax. The article also discusses the show's need for an interracial relationship to bring some diversity to the series. It mentions the short lived pairing of Ethan Lovett (Nathan Parsons) and Maya Ward (Annie Ilonzeh) as having great potential before the writers broke up the pairing. Sara Bibel of Xfinity also praised the pairing, and said they had the potential to become a truly great love story. She went on to say, "Carly’s newly single and has a thing for criminals. Shawn’s kindness towards Molly (Haley Pullos) indicates he will get along well with Carly’s kids. Blakemore is another one of casting director Mark Teschner’s amazing finds — even if he represents a continuation of GH’s annoying habit of naming characters after the actors who play them. It takes a strong presence to go toe-to-toe with Wright. They have combustible chemistry. The characters also have enough internal and external obstacles that their story practically writes itself. Shawn’s PTSD gives him anger issues — though after dealing with Sonny, Jason and Michael, Carly could probably teach a course in anger management. Shawn is currently at odds with the most important men in Carly’s life, Sonny and Jason. Shawn also brings some much needed ethnic diversity to GH, where people of color are usually relegated to the hospital — far from the center of the action."

In 2012, Blakemore received a Daytime Emmy Award nomination for Outstanding Supporting Actor in a Drama Series for his portrayal of Shawn. The nomination came as a surprise to many because Shawn had only been on the canvas for a few months. Blakemore had to say on the experience, "It’s a phenomenal experience. I’m so excited to be recognized first of all by your counterparts who say, “Hey, we really appreciate what you have to offer.” Then doing the show for such a short time, it's such a humbling experience and honor. I'm almost at a loss for words." Eventually, Blakemore did not win the award, losing to fellow GH cast member Jonathan Jackson, who portrays Lucky Spencer. In 2016, Blakemore received his second nomination for Outstanding Supporting Actor in a drama series and won the award for the first time.
