= Kristina Davis =

Fictional character from General Hospital

- General Hospital character
- Kate Mansi as Kristina Davis
- Portrayed by: Kali Rodriguez (2005–2008); Lexi Ainsworth (2009–2011, 2015–2023); Lindsey Morgan (2012–2013); Kate Mansi (2023–2026); (and others)
- Duration: 2002–2013; 2015–2026
- First appearance: November 19, 2002
- Last appearance: June 12, 2026
- Created by: Robert Guza, Jr. and Charles Pratt, Jr.
- Introduced by: Jill Farren Phelps (2002, 2009); Frank Valentini (2012–2023)
- Book appearances: The Secret Life of Damian Spinelli
- Spin-off appearances: General Hospital: Night Shift
- Kali Rodriguez as Kristina Davis

- Lexi Ainsworth as Kristina Davis
In-universe information
- Other names: Kristina Ashton (2002–2003); Kristina Adela Corinthos; Kristina Mitchell (2012)
- Occupation: Pub landlady (2024–present); Homeless shelter owner (2023–2024); Bar manager (2020–2024); Barmaid (2019–2020); Reality television star (2012); Student (2011–2017)
- Family: Cassadine
- Parents: Sonny Corinthos; Alexis Davis
- Half-brothers: Dante Falconeri; Michael Corinthos (adoptive); Morgan Corinthos
- Half-sisters: Sam McCall; Lila McCall; Molly Lansing; Avery Corinthos; Donna Corinthos
- Spouse: Trey Mitchell (2012)
- Daughters: Irene Davis-Ashford
- Grandparents: Mike Corbin; Mikkos Cassadine; Adela Corinthos; Kristin Bergman
- Aunts and uncles: Stavros Cassadine; Stefan Cassadine; Ric Lansing; Valentin Cassadine; Kristina Cassadine; Courtney Matthews
- Nieces and nephews: Gio Palmieri; Rocco Falconeri; Lila McCall; Danny Morgan; Emily Cain; Wiley Cooper-Jones (adoptive); Amelia Corinthos (adoptive); Irene Davis-Ashford (legal); Daisy Gilmore (adoptive)
- First cousins: Nikolas Cassadine; Charlotte Cassadine; Spencer Cassadine; Molly Lansing

Kristina Davis is a fictional character General Hospital, an American soap opera on the ABC network. Created by Robert Guza, Jr. and Charles Pratt, Jr., and introduced by Jill Farren Phelps in 2002, Kristina is the daughter of mob kingpin Sonny Corinthos (Maurice Benard) and his former attorney, Alexis Davis (Nancy Lee Grahn). Following the portrayal of several child actors, Kristina was rapidly aged in 2009, with the introduction of Lexi Ainsworth in the role. Signed as a recurring role, Ainsworth was upped to regular status, following favorable reception from audiences. In 2011, Ainsworth announced she had been let go from the role. The role was reintroduced the following year when Lindsey Morgan was cast. Morgan remained for eleven months and was written out following her final appearance in March 2013. In 2015, Ainsworth returned to the role, appearing sporadically until her exit in 2023. From 2023 to 2026, the role was portrayed by Kate Mansi.

Following Ainsworth's casting in 2009, the character was introduced into a teen abuse dating storyline, where Kristina is repeatedly assaulted by her boyfriend, Kiefer Bauer (Christian Alexander), and further develops a crush on Ethan Lovett (Nathan Parsons). Ainsworth's work during the storyline garnered praise from press. With Morgan's casting, Kristina returned to Port Charles alongside Trey Mitchell (Erik Valdez) — whom she later marries — producing a reality television series as an act of revenge against her parents. Ainsworth's return in 2015 welcomed additional storylines, including the exploration of her sexual fluidity and joining a cult disguised as a volunteer group, known as Dawn of Day. Ainsworth's work in the Dawn of Day storyline garnered her critical praise.

For her work as Kristina, Ainsworth performances has been met with favorable reception from audiences and critics. She received a nomination for Daytime Emmy Award for Outstanding Younger Actress in a Drama Series in 2011, later winning for the same category in 2017. Unlike her predecessor, reception for Morgan was less than favorable. Despite this, she earned a nomination for Outstanding Younger Actress in a Drama Series in 2013 for her work as Kristina.

== Casting ==
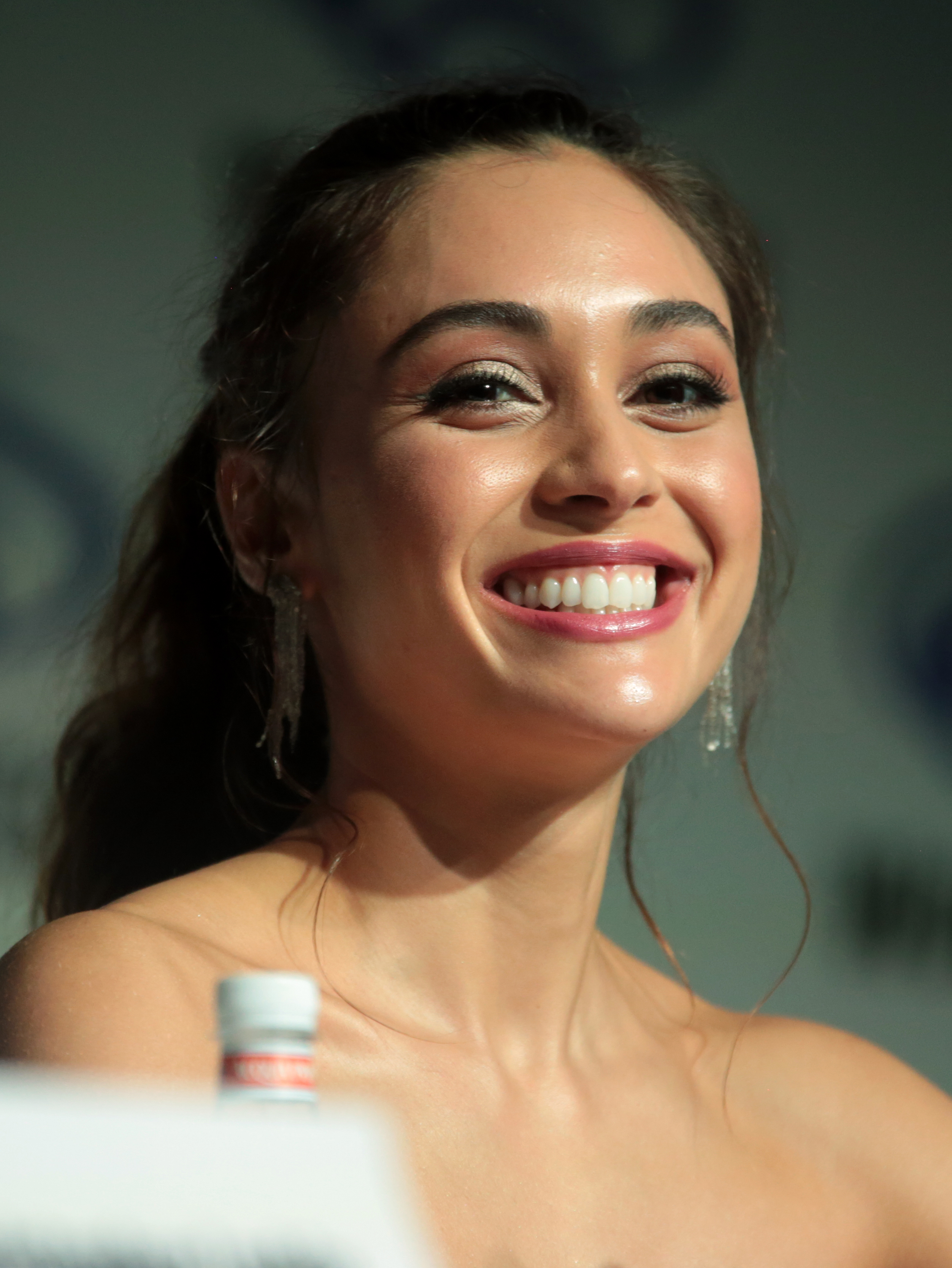
Lindsey Morgan was cast in the role of Kristina in 2012; she left the show the following year.

From December 2002 to July 2003, Kristina was portrayed by Julia and Joelle Carter; followed by Kara and Shelby Hoffman from July 23, 2003, to late 2003 then by Emma and Sarah Smith from December 23, 2003, until 2005. In November 2005, child actress, Kali Rodriguez stepped into the role on a recurring basis. Rodriguez last appears as Kristina on August 13, 2008.

In May 2009, it was announced teen actress Lexi Ainsworth had been cast in the role of Kristina. Ainsworth first appeared on June 4, 2009. Response from fans and critics was very positive and Ainsworth was put on contract later that month. After months of rumors and speculation, Ainsworth announced in October 2011 via Twitter she had been let go and had just filmed her last episode. Ainsworth's exit scenes aired on November 4, 2011.

After much speculation and rumor as to whether Ainsworth would return to the role, several sources reported that the show was looking to bring Kristina back to Port Charles. On April 17, 2012, TVLine reported that actress Lindsey Morgan has been cast as Kristina and would make her debut on May 25, 2012. Morgan explains during an interview that she was unaware what role she was auditioning for as only a vague character description was released instead of the character's name. The producers put Morgan through a chemistry test with Maurice Benard (Sonny Corinthos) and Nancy Lee Grahn (Alexis Davis), which was something that had not been done in years. On March 26, 2013, Morgan announced she had departed her role as Kristina; scenes concerning her exit aired on March 4.

On July 29, 2015, Soap Opera Digest broke news that Ainsworth would reprise the role of Kristina; scenes surrounding Kristina's return broadcast on September 17, 2015. In October 2017, it was revealed that Ainsworth has filmed her last scene on October 11 alongside Ashley Jones' character Parker Forsyth. In July 2018, Soap Opera Digest announced Ainsworth's return. Ainsworth made her return on August 15, 2018.

On May 4, 2023, it was announced Kate Mansi had been cast in the role of Kristina; Ainsworth made her final appearance on April 27, with Mansi debuting in the role on May 24. In a social media post, Ainsworth called her exit "mutually beneficial", citing her desire to seek other opportunities. In an exit interview with Soap Opera Digest, she further elaborated on her exit, calling it "bittersweet", and further explaining: "I was 16 when I started and my family on the show is like my second family because I basically grew up on the show. It will be sad not to have the opportunity to work with them on the show anymore, but I know that I will continue to have relationships with those people, and hopefully we can work together down the line." In May 2026, it was revealed Mansi had opted to exit the role. Speaking to soap journalist Stephanie Sloane, Mansi disclosed her decision to depart the role came down to her desire to pursue other projects and her feelings that she had done what she accomplished to do in taking on the role. Scenes concerning Kristina's departure aired on June 12, 2026.

== Development ==
=== Characterization ===
With the SORAS aging of Kristina in 2009, Kristina is initially introduced as a bit of a wild child. Kristina's trouble making ways during her first few months as "Kristina" are described as "phase". She often throws caution into the wind just to defy her parents because of how she grew up. However, several major events in her life, including causing her step-mother, Claudia's (Sarah Brown) car accident and miscarriage facilitate a character transition and Kristina morphs into somewhat of a "good girl". The vague 2012 casting call described the character as "soulful, but fiery." Newcomer Lindsey Morgan describes Kristina as having the perfect blend of qualities from both of her parents.

=== Teen dating abuse ===
In the summer of 2009, Kristina's boyfriend Kiefer Bauer (Christian Alexander) begins assaulting her repeatedly whenever he gets angry. Ainsworth praised the storyline saying several viewers could identify with her character. There was a very slow build in Kiefer's abusive attitude months before it actually happened and the storyline progresses in real time. On and off screen, Kristina's lack of positive male role models in her life is the reason for her choice to stay in an abusive relationship; she doesn't really know how to react to the situation, let alone remove herself from it. Ainsworth further discusses Kiefer's reason for the abuse, noting "he comes from a family who has instilled a feeling of entitlement in the young man." At the time, she is crushing on the older mysterious Ethan Lovett (Nathan Parsons) which only serves as a catalyst for Kiefer's anger. Kristina's crush turns to bitterness after a beating from Kiefer lands her in the hospital, and she blames Ethan.

=== Recast and reality ===
Kristina is the perfect blend of both of her parents, She is very ethical, like her mother. She's very honest and tells how she feels about things, which I feel comes from her mother, who lays down the law. Then again, she's very much like her father because she is very stubborn and can be kind of a hot head.

— Soaps In Depth, Lindsey Morgan

With the 2012 recast, Kristina returns home with a "vengeance" after discovering the truth about her parents' bribing the admissions office at Yale University to get her accepted. Morgan admits that Kristina's actions may be a bit questionable at times, but she only does certain things to get those around her to be honest with her. "Even though she is basically, really, extorting them right now, she's doing it almost for an ethical reason. In the end it's to expose her father--and her mother--and say, 'Hello, this is wrong!'" The plot in which Kristina forces her family to star in her reality show is also her way of asserting her independence. "College has shown her her own strength, her own power. And she's very much her father's daughter--and very much her mother's daughter. And very much tired of it all. Tired of them going behind her back, and tired of them being controlling. She needs to have her own say in her life." However, most viewers and critics didn't approve of the new direction and the reality aspect of the storyline. ABC Soaps in Depth gave the storyline a "Thumbs Down!" comparing it to a bad spoof of VH1's hit reality series, Mob Wives and the recast which is initially met with much disapproval is weighed down by the story. While SID has no problem with such a drastic character change as Ainsworth's Kristina according to SID is "relatable and likably soft" and Morgan's Kristina is written as "a jaded hell-raiser;" the reality show is not the best way to get fans to approve of the recast. In an interview with TVSource Magazine's Omar Nobles, Morgan revealed that Kristina was mostly upset by Sonny and Alexis pulling strings to get her into Yale because of what their actions said about her; "It's saying they didn't believe in her; she couldn't be admitted on her own and that hurt her. The people that she needs the most to believe in her doubted she could and that's why they did it... I also feel like they also thought she couldn't handle disappointment. That's what hurts her." Kristina forgives her parents knowing they meant well but she really cares about what they think of her. "As the middle child, especially with them never being together and Sonny and his huge family and other children; Alexis is busy with everything in her life. I think Kristina feels like she never got enough attention and was never truly seen by them. So when she's becoming an adult she wants to say them 'I am an adult and I can do this' and they don't think so and that hurts her."

=== Trey Mitchell ===
Everyone around her thinks she is making bad choices and is making the wrong decision but her ideology right now is, even if it is a bad decision, let me make it. Let me deal with the consequences.

— Morgan's take on Kristina's decisions

Along with the reality show storyline comes a new love interest for Kristina in Erik Valdez's Trey Mitchell, a grad student from Yale who convinces her to launch the Mob Princess series. According to Morgan, Kristina is very much blindsided by Trey as she is going through a time in her life where she is trying to find some stability. Coming from such an unconventional family where her parents never actually tried to be together leaves Kristina yearning for that family unit she never had with her parents. Even though Trey appears to be manipulating her, Kristina hopes the relationship will turn into something more when they marry on August 28, 2012. Kristina's need for a stable family is reflected in her concern for her sister, Sam McCall (Kelly Monaco) when her marriage begins falling apart. Though Kristina has always dreamed of having that "perfect family," she does not see her marriage to Trey being a major deal because she expects the marriage will be over just as quickly as it began. Kristina goes through with the marriage to help Trey realize how much she really does care for him, and hopes he will reciprocate those feelings. Morgan admitted to being confused as to why she trusts Trey so much, as opposed to her family, especially when it comes to her older brother, Michael (Chad Duell). Morgan revealed in an interview Kristina still sees Michael as the overprotective big brother and since leaving college, she's been trying to assert her independence. In a November 2012 interview, Morgan gave her take on Kristina's reason for falling for Trey; besides his looks, Trey is very different from the guys she's date previously or has been interested in. When Kristina is humiliated at school thanks to everyone finding out about Sonny pulling strings to get her in, Trey is the only person who likes her for who she is. "Even when he was playing her, and he obviously did play her – he was probably the person that showered her with the most attention. She took that as 'he's so together, he's interested in my life and I'm his muse, I'm in his star. That meant a lot her, especially after being with guys who never treated her that way or never really seemed to care about her." When asked if Kristina could forgive Trey, Morgan explained that it is definitely a possibility and describes Trey as being the most real love interest for her character. "I mean, he shot his own father to protect her in the end. So he did make the right decision in the end, but it took him a while. I think right now she's just so hurt by it and just so in shock. I could see if like it was 'never again, we'll be perfect together' and whatnot. But I could see her forgiving him, but knowing her it would take a while. And take lots of flowers and candy."

== Storylines ==
=== 2002–2008 ===
Kristina is born on-screen on November 19, 2002, to Alexis Davis and her then-fiancé, Ned Ashton; named after Alexis's late sister, Kristina Cassadine and Sonny's late mother, Adela Corinthos. After a one-night stand with mob boss, Sonny Corinthos, Alexis learns she is pregnant and tries to pass the child off as Ned's. Ned agrees to pretend to be Kristina's father to protect her from Sonny's lifestyle. The truth comes out when Kristina becomes ill and stem cells from Sonny's stillborn daughter with Sam McCall are used to save Kristina's life; Sam would later turn out to be Alexis's long lost daughter. After a court battle, Alexis and Sonny agree to share custody of Kristina, but she would live full-time with Alexis, and Sonny would be allowed to see her whenever he wanted. Kristina is officially christened as Kristina Adela Corinthos-Davis with Ric Lansing and Carly Corinthos as her godparents. Soon after, Carly and Sonny's sons, Michael and Morgan, are kidnapped by A. J. Quartermaine, but rescued by Sam and Jason Morgan. When Alexis is diagnosed with cancer, Kristina briefly lives with Sonny and Carly. When Kristina witnesses Sam shooting Diego Alcazar, she goes into a trance like state for weeks. She eventually recovers and breaks her silence on Christmas. Kristina goes silent again when she sees Diego alive as the Text Message Killer. After Michael is shot and rendered comatose after an attempt on Sonny's life, Alexis reinforces Sonny staying away from their daughter.

=== 2009–2011 ===
Kristina reappears as a teenager who is acting out. She feels that her father does not spend enough time with her, and she is unable to live up to her mother's expectations. Sam tries to give Kristina advice to make herself happy rather than impressing her mother. When Michael wakes up from his coma, Kristina is thrilled to have her brother back, but Alexis wants them to stay apart, thinking Michael will cause trouble. Kristina rebels against this, and spends time with Michael, Morgan, and her younger sister, Molly Lansing. One night, Kristina drives home upset and crying, and causes her stepmother, Claudia, to crash and miscarry her child. Sam suspects Kristina is responsible, but Michael confesses and leaves town. Kristina, guilt-ridden, runs away with Michael to Mexico. They are taken hostage by Jerry Jacks briefly, but escape and are later brought home by Sam and Jason. By this time, Kristina is revealed to be the driver who caused the accident, but Alexis confesses to protect her. Alexis lets Sonny spend time with Kristina, hoping to help her heal.

Kristina is dating her classmate, Kiefer Bauer, but he is emotionally and physically abusive towards her. The abuse eventually lands Kristina in the hospital. Kristina initially lies, and claims that Ethan Lovett attacked her, afraid that Sonny will kill Kiefer. Her lie is exposed when Kiefer beats her again. Kiefer dies when Alexis runs him over while taking Kristina to the hospital. Kristina blames herself for Kiefer's death. Alexis is not charged, and Kiefer's father, Warren, is furious. He tries to get Kristina to accuse Ethan again so Alexis will be charged. Kristina refuses, and Warren becomes deranged, opening fire within General Hospital, and tries to kill Kristina. He is gunned down before he can, and Kristina tries to heal with the help of her family. Kristina has a crush on Ethan, but he never reciprocates. When Claudia is killed and Sonny is accused, Kristina pushes her father away, until Michael confesses to the murder. Kristina is heartbroken when Michael goes to prison. Upset with Sonny, Kristina pretends to date mobster Johnny Zacchara to anger Sonny. Unfortunately, Kristina is nearly killed when Sonny plants a bomb in Johnny's car, and two agree to end their charade.

Kristina is aboard the General Hospital ski trip bus when it crashes. She survives, but her friend, Ali, dies, leaving her devastated. She's consoled by Sonny, and the two start to mend their relationship. When Kristina becomes a nanny for Emma Drake, Lisa Niles tries to get her hooked on drugs, claiming they're herbal supplements. Fortunately, Ethan discovers this, and helps Kristina get clean. Kristina applies to Yale, her mother's alma mater, but she is wait-listed. Disappointed, she tries to get a job at Crimson Magazine under Kate Howard. However, she later gets accepted into Yale, and leaves town to attend college.

=== 2012–2013 ===
Kristina returns to Port Charles after disappearing from campus weeks prior. Having learned of her parents schemes to get her into Yale and being outcast as the "Mob Princess", Kristina starts a reality show appropriately titled Mob Princess to teach her parents a lesson. Her family believes she is allowing her producer, Trey Mitchell to manipulate her because she is attracted to him. After months of forcing cameras on her family, Trey suddenly shuts down the show so he and Kristina can date. Trey later tells Kristina to believe the production company will sue him if he doesn't deliver a show and he tricks her into marrying him in Las Vegas on camera. Kristina's initial plan is to have the marriage annulled, but after she and Trey consummate the marriage, she refuses.

Trey later reveals that he's the son of Kate and Joe Scully Jr., Sonny's mob enemy. Realizing he lied to her, Kristina is initially furious with Trey. Soon after, though, she is kidnapped by Joe, who intended to kill her, so her inheritance would go to Trey. His plan is interrupted when Trey arrives and stops his father. In the aftermath, Kristina and Trey sign the annulment papers. After Joe dies, Kristina comforts Trey. Kristina and Trey reconcile, and decide to move to Los Angeles together. Before they can, Kristina and Trey are involved in a car accident with Kate, and Trey ends up brain-dead. Trey dies soon after, and Kristina is furious, blaming Kate, who is under the influence of her alternate personality, Connie. Kristina attacks her, wanting payback, and ends up getting arrested. At the hearing, Connie takes back her statement and Kristina is sentenced to 500 hours of community service. After finishing her community service, Kristina enrolls in Wesleyan University.

=== 2015–2017 ===
Kristina returns to Port Charles, following her father's shooting. Kristina later reveals that she was suspended from Wesleyan for trying to offer sex to a professor in exchange for a better grade. She tries to hide it from her parents, intercepting any emails or letters sent from Wesleyan. However, Alexis and Sonny find out, and Kristina admits her mistake. The professor she tried to seduce is revealed to be a woman named Parker Forsyth, and Kristina admits that she's questioning her sexuality. While Parker continuously tries to keep Kristina at arm's length, claiming it would ruin her career and her marriage, it doesn't do much to keep Kristina at bay. After Kristina kisses Parker, Parker proclaims that they can't be together and Kristina tried to move on with her new boyfriend Aaron. After being seemingly happy with perfect boyfriend Aaron, Kristina goes to see Parker again but this time to tell her she's moving on. However, once it's revealed that Parker's marriage had ended, Kristina makes a move and they have sex.

Parker considered it a mistake, that she needed more time to piece her life back together but Kristina convinces her to give their relationship a try. However, Alexis runs into Parker on her way to lecture and furiously pushes her into breaking up with Kristina. Parker leaves a letter explaining that she and Kristina have no future together and she leaves town without saying goodbye. Kristina is heartbroken and works on moving on. She tells her boyfriend Aaron about how she cheated on him and Aaron breaks up with her. Aaron isn't seen onscreen again.

Some time passes and Kristina calls Parker in a drunken stupor to voice her anger at her for leaving but settled for leaving a voicemail. Molly intervenes and takes Kristina home. Later Kristina sees that Parker called her back and rushes to campus to rekindle their relationship. Parker claims it was an accident and admits that she's getting back with her wife to fix her marriage. Kristina is furious and yells at Parker for being selfish and using her and then leaves.

There is a mention of Parker when Kristina's brother, Morgan, dies in a car explosion meant for Julian. Kristina steps up to comfort her father, Sonny, who blames himself. Kristina's character matures while dealing with Morgan's death. Parker sends a sympathy card with her wife's name also written on it. Kristina admits that she still dreams about Parker.

Time passes and Kristina and Molly are enrolled at Port Charles University when Molly's class is assigned a different teacher before the semester begins. They are shocked to realize it is Parker. Kristina tried to decide how to handle the situation but Alexis finds out first when they meet Parker at a park concert in town. Alexis is furious and tries to drive Parker away but Kristina fends her off, claiming she could take care of her own life and that she needs to stop controlling hers. Alexis leaves and Kristina goes to seek out Parker. They talk and Parker reveals her marriage was officially dead. They flirt but ultimately Parker can't risk her career and this time Kristina doesn't push it.

Kristina, still having feelings for Parker, tries to take her mind off her by going to a "Ladies night" at the Floating Rib with Valerie as her wing woman. Valerie points out that a woman is giving Kristina "looks" and it turns out to be Parker. Parker is playing pool with another woman. Kristina tells Valerie about their one-night stand and how Parker dumped her and Valerie decides they should make Parker jealous and starts to kiss Kristina. Parker is visibly upset by this.

Later Parker helps Kristina take care of Scout while Sam is at the hospital with Jason. They talk and Parker admits that she isn't dating anyone. Valerie walks up to them and poses as Kristina's girlfriend, still trying to make Parker jealous and Kristina plays along, trying to move on from her former professor.

The story is rushed after this. Kristina decides that she doesn't want to lie to Parker, even to save their feelings and confesses that her and Val weren't ever a couple. Parker insist that they go somewhere to talk. At lunch, they both admit they still are attracted to each other and Kristina kisses Parker again. Parker can't and won't risk her career however and claims again that they couldn't be together and apologizes for leading her on. Kristina comes to the decision to put her happiness first and drops out of PCU, since she couldn't focus on her classes and her grades were poor anyway. Not being a student anymore, Parker asks Kristina out to dinner and they official go on a date.

During the date, they talk of Morgan's death, among other things and Kristina admits that she hadn't told her parents they were together but she wasn't going to hide it either. She would tell them later. Parker asks for the check so they could "go to her place for coffee". They kiss very publicly and they decide to "skip the coffee".

The next day Kristina walks Parker to her class after spending the night together and the Dean promptly comes in and fires Parker since she was reportedly caught kiss Kristina while she was still a student. They are both devastated. Kristina's mother, Alexis comes into the room shortly after and demands that Parker stay away from her daughter. Kristina accuses her mother of reporting Parker to the Dean but she denies it. Finally stepping up to Alexis, Parker admits that she's in love with Kristina and that her being fired doesn't change anything. Alexis accuses Parker of manipulating Kristina and Kristina tells her that Parker never did anything inappropriate and that Kristina started it all and pushed for it. Alexis refuses to believe it. Kristina asks Parker what she will do without her job and Parker admits she has a house her parents left her in Oregon that's in a college town. Kristina proclaims she's going with her, only if Parker wanted her there. Parker agrees and they run away to Oregon, to have a happy life together.

== Reception ==
In March 2011, Ainsworth and her co-star Haley Pullos (Molly Lansing) won at the Young Artist Awards with Ainsworth taking home the award for Best Actress in a Daytime Series. Ainsworth earned a Daytime Emmy Nomination for her portrayal of Kristina during the abuse storyline for the Outstanding Young Actress category in 2011. Morgan earned a Daytime Emmy nomination for Outstanding Young Actress in 2013. In 2017, Ainsworth won the Daytime Emmy Award for Outstanding Younger Actress in a Drama Series for her portrayal of Kristina during her bisexuality storyline.

Hollie Deese from Soaps She Knows named Kristina as the worst General Hospital character of 2012, saying that the character "never made it past coming off as an over-privileged brat". More than a decade later, Charlie Mason and Richard Simms from the same website called the 2023 recasting of Kristina the "Best Recast" in American soap operas of that year, commenting that Mansi "naturally slipped" into the role.
