= Holly Sutton-Scorpio =

Fictional soap opera character

- General Hospital character
- Emma Samms as Holly Sutton-Scorpio
- Portrayed by: Emma Samms (1982–2024); Finola Hughes (2022)
- Duration: 1982–1985; 1992–1993; 2006; 2009; 2012–2013; 2015; 2020; 2022–2024
- First appearance: July 1, 1982
- Last appearance: November 12, 2024
- Created by: Anne Howard Bailey
- Introduced by: Gloria Monty (1982, 1992); Jill Farren Phelps (2006, 2009); Frank Valentini (2012–2024)
In-universe information
- Occupation: Con artist; WSB Agent
- Father: Charles Sutton
- Half-sisters: Paloma Sutton
- Husband: Robert Scorpio (1983–1992)
- Sons: Ethan Lovett
- Daughters: Sasha Gilmore
- Grandchildren: Liam Corbin; Daisy Gilmore; Phoebe Wilson
- Uncles: Clive Durban
- First cousins: Basil Durban; Algenon Durban; Barry Durban; Alistair Durban

Holly Sutton-Scorpio is a fictional character from General Hospital, an American soap opera on the ABC network, portrayed by Emma Samms. She originally appeared from July 1, 1982, to September 5, 1985. With Samms choosing to leave the series amicably to go to ABC's prime time hit Dynasty and its spin-off The Colbys, Holly seemingly perished in a plane crash. "Fan favorite" Samms had been so popular at General Hospital that Holly was brought back from the dead on January 16, 1992, after a seven-year absence. She stayed in the role until July 22, 1993, during this time also playing Holly's lookalike half-sister Paloma, a heroic revolutionary.

After a 13-year absence, Samms made a seven-episode return to General Hospital as Holly on February 20, 2006, in time for the series' 11,000th episode. She reappeared for a three-week run starting May 1 and then again on June 30 the same year. Samms again made a brief return to the series on May 15, 2009. In January 2012, it was announced Samms would once again temporarily step back into the role of Holly. She returned from February 28 to March 8, 2012. Emma Samms again returned for a short stints in August 2013 and June 2015, the latter as part of the story leading to the exit of Anthony Geary's Luke.

On September 18, 2020, Samms briefly reprised the role of Holly. In August 2022, it was announced she would again return to the role in October of that year; she returned from October 20 to November 30. On March 13, 2023, it was announced Samms would again reprise the role; she was set to make her return on April 14 of the same year; however, due to a preemption, her return date was pushed back to April 17. On July 29, 2024, it was announced Samms would reprise the role, with Holly returning during the final moments of the September 4 episode. She departed the role when Holly left Port Charles with Robert in November 2024.

== Storylines ==
=== 1982–1985 ===
Holly met Luke met at a camping trip, when he saw her skinny dipping. He was smitten, and they ended up having a one-night stand. Holly set up Luke, as she played a principal role in an oil scam designed to bilk the citizens of Port Charles out of millions. Luke refused to believe Holly was a professional grifter. Eventually, Holly was forced to admit the truth. Then, Holly was kidnapped. Luke and Robert Scorpio traveled to Victoria, British Columbia, to rescue Holly and recover the money stolen by her ex-cohorts. Still hurt over Holly's deception and unable to fully trust her, Luke and Holly ended up having a terrible argument. Luke packed his things and headed to the mountains. Shortly afterwards, news arrived there had been an avalanche. Luke was presumed dead, but he had broken his back and was recuperating in a remote hospital. Holly discovered she was pregnant with Luke's child and about to be deported. To honor Luke's memory, Robert offered to marry Holly and help raise Luke's child. Soon after the wedding Holly suffered a miscarriage.

Both Robert and Holly were shocked and dismayed when Luke returned alive and well. Luke was deeply hurt to find out his best friend and his ex-lover not only married but had fallen for each other. This ignited one of General Hospital's best love triangle stories. Holly found herself torn between the two men for a while. However, Holly came to realize the man she truly loved was Robert. Robert and Holly Scorpio went on to become one of the most successful couples in GH history. When Luke later reunited with Laura and left town, the Scorpios took over as the main Supercouple on the show and helped maintain the show's stellar ratings. Robert and Holly were hailed by the fans and the press as the most romantic couple in Daytime. They broke the mold of soap couples by being happily married, totally devoted to each other while never being boring and always being frontburner. The chemistry, romance, class, sexiness and charm of this couple would delight millions of fans for the next few years to come.

In 1985, their marriage was put to the test when a secret ex-wife from Robert's past came to town in the form of Anna Devane. While this shocking development drove a wedge between them for a time, they later reconciled and decided to move to Australia. Holly went ahead to Australia first. Robert remained behind to tie up loose ends. However, just after Holly left for Australia Robert found a young girl in his home. Much to his astonishment, Robert learned she was his daughter, Robin. After an adventure in the Asian Quarter, Robert left for Australia to be with Holly. He then returns and reveals that Holly has ostensibly been killed in a plane crash.

=== 1992–1993 ===
In reality, Holly had been in a car accident and fell into a coma for nearly two years. Her family did not let Robert know she was alive. When she awoke, she discovered her husband engaged to another woman and, feeling it was too late to regain the life she had with Robert, she made the decision to stay away and let him keep his new happiness. Their paths crossed again in 1992. Robert was astonished to find Holly alive. He was angry and hurt but in a short amount of time came to entrust Robin into the care of both Holly and his brother Mac while he left town to try to find the kidnapped Anna.

Before going in search after his kidnapped wife Anna, Robert had divorce papers drawn up upon Holly's request to dissolve his marriage to Holly. However, after his and Anna's death, Holly tore up the divorce papers. Holly, devastated over Robert's "death", continued to help Mac care for Robin for a while. She later dated Bill Eckert, Luke's look-alike cousin, before leaving Port Charles in 1993.

=== 2006–2020 ===
Robert would turn up alive and well in 2006 which drew Holly back to town. She briefly returned in February 2006 demanding a huge payout for the antidote for a mutant strain of encephalitis while infected several residents of Port Charles. She claimed it was her extreme hurt and anger over Robert really being alive all these years and not telling anyone that drove her to her actions. Holly returned again that May. Holly was last seen briefly the following June while taking a bubble bath, calling Luke to lead him on a wild goose chase.

Holly reappeared on May 15, 2009 to shed light on the question of whether new arrival Ethan Lovett is her son — and whether Luke or Robert may be the father. She confirms she is Ethan's mother and initially reveals Robert is his father on May 22, 2009. After Robert's daughter Robin tells Ethan that Robert was in Port Charles and not with Holly when Ethan would have been conceived, Holly confesses to Luke on May 29, 2009, Ethan is in fact his son. Both Luke and Ethan are angry with Holly. She makes peace with them on June 2, 2009.

Holly returned to town again in February 2012 just as Helena Cassadine is about to shoot and kill Ethan. Holly confesses that she lied about Ethan's paternity, revealing that Robert is in fact his father, not Luke. She then confesses her love to Luke and that she merely fabricated the DNA results to make her own wishes true. She later confessed that she made it up (and that Ethan is really Luke's son) to protect Ethan's life and that she was asked to come to town by Luke.

Holly left town with Robert to hunt down and protect Ethan from Helena's plot. It was later revealed that Holly had reconciled with Robert. On January 9, 2013, Anna mentioned that Holly was in Switzerland looking after Robert, who was in a coma after being injected with a drug. Holly came to visit Robert while Anna and Duke dealt with Faison. Holly later phoned Mac at the Floating Rib to let him know of Robert's unchanged condition. In 2013 Holly help Luke in his plan to find Jerry Jacks to save his life.

In June 2015, Laura returns with news that Lucky was kidnapped, prompting Luke and Laura to go rescue their son. The search leads them to a hotel in British Columbia. On June 26, Holly also arrives at the hotel revealing that Ethan was kidnapped as well. While waiting to hear from the kidnappers, Holly and Laura have a heart-to-heart about their children and their involvement with Luke, and finally they make peace with each other. Then, they receive a photo that shows Lucky and Ethan tied up and gagged. They show the photo to Luke, and they all realize that Lucky and Ethan are giving them clues about their location, revealed to be a lumberyard close to their hotel. Luke, Laura, Holly, Dillon and Lulu fight some guards and find only Ethan at the lumberyard. Soon, they are surrounded by guards and it is then that they discover that the mastermind behind the kidnapping was Frank Smith, Luke and Laura's enemy presumed dead since 1994. Frank shoots Ethan in the arm, but allows Holly, Lulu, Dillon and Ethan to leave as he only wants Luke and Laura. Holly takes Ethan to the hospital to treat his wound. Then, she returns home with Ethan.

In 2020, Robert receives a phone call informing him that Holly is dead. Unable to accept this as truth, he begins to investigate into her death. After receiving a phone call from someone who believed to be Holly, he has the call traced to Monte Carlo, where Holly is being held captive. Accompanied by Olivia Quartermaine, they infiltrate the Le Lucien casino, owned by mercenary Winston Rudge. They find Ethan there, also investigating his mother's alleged death. Robert, Olivia and Ethan take down Rudge and his guards, and the casino is shut down by the WSB. Before being hauled away, Rudge tells Robert that they had Holly as a prisoner, but had to kill her when she got out of hand to control. The WSB seemingly confirms this when they find an unmarked grave with the burned remains that match Holly's description and wedding rings. Devastated, Robert and Ethan accept Holly is truly gone and return to Port Charles. However, on September 18, it is later revealed that Holly is actually alive and being held prisoner at another location by an unknown person.

=== 2022–present ===
In October 2022, a mysterious woman appears outside in the water, before swimming to shore. She makes her way to the Quartermaine boathouse, where she is found by Willow Tait (Katelyn MacMullen), Michael Corinthos (Chad Duell), Ned Quartermaine (Wally Kurth), and his wife, Olivia Falconeri (Lisa LoCicero). When Olivia discovers her inside the boathouse, she contacts Robert and Dante Falconeri (Dominic Zamprogna). Once they arrive, Olivia tells Robert to brace himself before going inside, so he enters the boathouse and is shocked to see Holly, alive and well. Robert is overjoyed, but then wonders where Holly's been for the past two years since they thought she was dead. Holly claims that she doesn't remember anything about the past two years, so Robert takes her to the hospital to get her examined. Afterwards, Holly catches up with her friends and loved ones, eventually visiting Anna in jail since Anna was framed for shooting Lucy Coe (Lynn Herring). In November, it's revealed that Holly is being blackmailed by Victor Cassadine (Charles Shaughnessy) into spying on Robert and keeping him distracted long enough for him to make sure Anna would be convicted of murder in order to secure her freedom and Victor threatens to kill a male prisoner to keep her in line. It was also revealed that Holly impersonated Anna and shot Lucy under Victor's orders. When Robert eventually becomes suspicious of Holly's odd behavior, he confronts her about working for Victor.

Holly reveals that Victor is blackmailing her and explains that back in 2020, she was investigating Winston Rudge since she believed Victor was alive. After her cover was blown, she was kidnapped. She had stolen a phone and called Robert for help, so as punishment, Victor revealed himself and made her watch as he killed Paloma Perez, Holly's lookalike half-sister, which explained why the WSB assumed the burned remains belonged to Holly. In addition, Holly reveals that Victor moved her from place to place before sending her to keep him distracted after she impersonated Anna to shoot Lucy. Robert was horrified, but Holly reveals that Lucy is alive and she only shot her with a rubber bullet. After Holly reveals to Robert that Victor kidnapped Ethan and is holding him hostage to keep her in line, Robert decides to help her get out from under Victor's thumb.

Holly and Robert, with help from Felicia Scorpio (Kristina Wagner), stage an elaborate ruse to make everyone think Holly drugged Robert and stole a necklace containing the Ice Princess diamond. Holly takes Laura hostage at gunpoint, but lets her go and gives her a phone to call Kevin Collins (Jon Lindstrom) for help. The cops track Holly down to a remote cabin where it eventually explodes, causing Holly to catch on fire. After Robert puts out the fire, Holly is loaded up on an ambulance where it turns out she's okay. After Robert, Felicia, and Holly made everyone believe that Holly had been severely burned and is being transferred to a burn unit, Victor is led to believe that the necklace had been destroyed and Holly is useless to him now. Robert and Holly share a goodbye before she leaves town to go find Ethan and rescue him.

In April of the following year, Felicia travels to Venezuela and reunites with Holly, who is disguised as a hotel maid. The two dress up and enter an auction, where auctioneers bid on who gets to end the life of Ethan (James Ryan). Holly and Felicia initially make the bid to save Ethan's life, but are outbid by a woman in white, who is revealed to be Tracy Quartermaine (Jane Elliot), who did a better job of trying to save Ethan's life. Although the auctioneers plan to have them killed, they ultimately escape. On a plane ride back to Port Charles, Holly and Ethan have a heart-to-heart and Ethan reveals that he can't stay in Port Charles since some bad people are after him so he's going back to Australia to settle things once and for all. Although Holly is worried about Ethan, she accepts his decision and before they part ways, Ethan passes along some information to help take down Victor.

Once Felicia and Holly return to Port Charles, Robert is surprised to see Holly back in town and learns that Ethan was rescued. They go to the hospital to see Anna, who was shot by Victor before having her name cleared, and Holly apologizes to Anna for framing her for a murder that never happened. Anna forgives Holly before talk turned to Victor's biggest plan, which involved biological warfare. Realizing that Victor plans to unleash a pathogen to eliminate 80% of the world's population, they decide to travel to Greenland to stop him, especially when the WSB called in a drone strike to eliminate Victor thanks to Scott Baldwin (Kin Shriner). Robert wants to join them, but Anna and Holly tell him to stay. The two then join Laura, Curtis Ashford (Donnell Turner), Valentin Cassadine (James Patrick Stuart), and Drew Cain (Cameron Mathison) in stopping Victor once and for all and rescuing Liesl Obrecht (Kathleen Gati), Spencer Cassadine (Nicholas Chavez), and his half-brother, Ace Prince-Cassadine before the drone strike hits. They succeed and the drone strike kills Victor, so once they return to Port Charles, Holly tries to rekindle a relationship with Robert, who's currently interested in Diane Miller (Carolyn Hennesy), but realizes that she and Robert are in different places. After Robert and Holly say goodbye again, she returns to Australia to help Ethan settle his debts.

In October 2024, Holly again returns to Port Charles and showed up at the Quartermaine Mansion. When Sasha Corbin (Sofia Mattsson) answers the door, she refers to Holly as "mother". Holly begs her Sasha to end her relationship with Cody Bell (Josh Kelly), revealing him as her cousin, as Robert is her father.

== Reception ==
In 2023, Charlie Mason from Soaps She Knows placed Holly at #23 on his ranked list of General Hospital’s 40+ Greatest Characters of All Time, commenting, "Rumors of the “reformed” con artist’s death were, thankfully, greatly exaggerated. What has never been overstated, however — and perhaps can’t be — is that she is as crafty as she is beautiful."
