= Olivia Falconeri =

Fictional character

- General Hospital character
- Portrayed by: Lisa LoCicero
- Duration: 2008–present
- First appearance: September 19, 2008
- Created by: Robert Guza, Jr.
- Introduced by: Jill Farren Phelps
In-universe information
- Other names: Olivia Maria Falconeri; Olivia Quartermaine
- Occupation: First Lady; Businesswoman; Hotelier
- Mother: Talia Garibaldi Falconeri
- Brothers: Vito Falconeri; Vinnie Falconeri; Phil Falconeri; Cosimo Falconeri
- Spouse: Ned Quartermaine (2017–present)
- Sons: Dante Falconeri; Leo Falconeri
- Stepdaughters: Brook Lynn Ashton
- Grandsons: Gio Palmieri; Rocco Falconeri
- Uncles: Jude Falconeri
- Aunts: Theresa Falconeri; Theresa Garibaldi
- Nephews: Tommy Falconeri
- First cousins: Connie Falconeri; Violetta Falconeri

Olivia Falconeri is a fictional character from General Hospital, an American soap opera on the ABC network. Created by head writer Robert Guza, Jr. and introduced by executive producer Jill Farren Phelps, the role been portrayed by Lisa LoCicero since September 2008.

== Casting ==
The role of Olivia Falconeri was originated by Lisa LoCicero on September 19, 2008, on a recurring basis. It was announced in July 2009 that LoCicero was put on contract with the series, just a month before her onscreen cousin Kate Howard was dropped to recurring status. In 2015, she returned to recurring status, where she has remained since – however, Olivia remains a key character in the show.

== Storylines ==
=== Backstory ===
Olivia Falconeri grew up in a large Italian family in the Brooklyn neighborhood of Bensonhurst. She was very close with her cousin, Connie (aka Kate Howard) when they were growing up until Connie left town for college and changed her name, abandoning their family, including Olivia. As a teenager, Olivia became involved with Sonny Corinthos and their brief relationship would lead to the birth of their son, Dante in 1984, when she was 15. Sonny and Connie would also date until Connie left town to attend Princeton University. Olivia keeps Dante's paternity secret due to Sonny being in the mob and leads everyone else to believe she was promiscuous, and that Dante's father can one of any three or four other men. Only Kate knows the truth about Olivia's son and has kept her secret even after she changed her name and left her family. Olivia was very relieved when Kate didn't run off with Sonny, but was upset when Kate left her family to pursue her dreams. After Kate left Bensonhurst and changed her identity, Olivia did not have any contact with Kate for twenty years. She kept herself posted on Kate's accomplishments through newspapers and magazines.

=== 2008–09 ===
Olivia was reconnected with her past after she saw Sonny at Frankie's bar. Sonny, engaged to Kate, asked Olivia to come to Port Charles to be Kate's maid-of-honor. When she arrived in Port Charles, she checked into the Metro Court Hotel where she meets Carly Corinthos Jacks, Sonny's ex-wife. Olivia told Carly who she was and revealed to Carly that Kate's real identity is Connie Falconeri and she hails from Bensonhurst, not Connecticut.

On the day of the wedding, Olivia helped Kate fix her hair and get dressed for the ceremony. Olivia presented Kate with a necklace all Falconeri women have worn to their weddings. Kate refused to wear the heirloom and the two had a loud argument that everyone in the chapel could hear. Olivia, furious Kate denies her identity by refusing to wear the heirloom, decides to wear the necklace herself. After Kate was shot at the altar, Olivia was grief-stricken, fearing for her cousin's life. As she held a bloody, wounded Kate, she told her she is proud of who she has become and she is happy she accomplished everything she dreamed of. Kate was rushed to General Hospital and Olivia told Sonny that she will be making all of Kate's medical decisions because she is her only family. She agreed to let Patrick Drake operate on Kate since he is one of the best neurosurgeons in the country. Kate survived the operation, but was slow to recover. During Kate's stay in the hospital, Patrick overhears a conversation between Olivia and her cousin clearly stating that Sonny has a grown son with Olivia. While Kate is in recovery, Olivia discovered (through Carly) Sonny never left the mob, like he had told Kate and had lied to everyone about. Carly also told Olivia about the shooting of her son, Michael, due to Sonny's lifestyle and warned Olivia to keep Kate away from Sonny. Olivia worriedly told Kate what she learned, but Kate did not believe her.

She retorted Olivia was just jealous because she got Sonny and now she doesn't have the love of her son's father. Kate seemed on the fence about wanting to tell Sonny about Dante. She felt if Sonny learns about his son, it will give him a reason to live and it will stop him from joining the mob and taking revenge. Olivia is adamant about not doing it, because she fears that her son would get hurt. She doesn't want Dante to suffer little Michael's fate. After the Metro Court Hotel is having issues, Jasper Jacks offers Olivia a job on the spot as the hotel's operations manager. Olivia has since been Jax and his wife's friend. She also helped Jax and Carly when making a decision on Michael Corinthos's surgery. Olivia met Claudia Zacchara at Jake's on October 13, 2008. Claudia brought up the wedding incident and a verbal fight ensues. Olivia and Carly, Jax's wife, came together to try and stop Sonny from marrying Claudia, but he does so anyway, costing him his friendship with Olivia.

=== 2009–2010 ===
Olivia begins a relationship with Johnny Zacchara in May 2009, after the two meet while both out for drinks at Jake's, the local bar. Due to the large age gap between the two, they receive much criticism from those around Port Charles. Despite the disapproval from Sonny and Johnny's older sister Claudia, the two continue to see one another. Soon after, Dante arrives in town, claiming to be around to visit and keep and eye on his Ma. Olivia eventually discovers he is working for Sonny under an alias. Despite his marriage to Claudia, Sonny begins confessing his love to Olivia, saying he wants to be with her, not his wife. Olivia rejects him, stating he is a married man and should be with Claudia. Olivia, worried for her son's safety, and for the secret of his father's identity to stay hidden, tries to get Dante off the case against Sonny. An argument between Olivia and Dante that ends up being overheard by Claudia leads to discover Olivia's secret; that she is Dante's mother and he is not as loyal to Sonny as he appears. Claudia holds this over Olivia's head, threatening to blow everything up unless Olivia breaks up with Johnny. Olivia, desperately wanting to protect her son, tells Johnny she still loves Sonny and that's why she's breaking up with him. Johnny does not believe Olivia's reasoning and assumes his sister is behind her suddenly pushing him away. He later tells Olivia he wants to keep seeing her, but they should keep it a secret. Claudia finds out and in retaliation, tells Olivia she's going to have sex with Dante. Olivia goes to Sonny to tell him the truth, not wanting things to escalate. Sonny, tired of the constant battle between Olivia and Claudia, does not wait to hear what Olivia has to say. Michael walks in, overhearing the conversation, and tells Olivia to back off. Olivia tells Sonny he should be proud for having a son who stands up for him.

Jax eventually finds out Olivia's secret, but agrees to keep it as such so Sonny will go to prison. Olivia must plan Claudia's birthday party on Sonny's behalf since it is taking place at the Metro Court. Just before the party, Olivia gets into a scuffle with Claudia when she threatens to tell her secret to Sonny. The police are called by people who overheard the two women fighting, and Claudia then claims Olivia attacked her, and Olivia is taken to the police station. At the PCPD station, she asks Mac Scorpio, the police commissioner, who is aware that her son is working undercover, to let her go so she can warn her son about Claudia's knowledge. He agrees, wanting Dante to take Sonny down. When she gets to the Metro Court, she comes in time to hear Sonny rip into Claudia for being responsible for getting Michael shot months earlier. Claudia pulls out a gun and takes a pregnant Carly hostage. Sonny later talks with Olivia, telling her he should have trusted her when she said Claudia was not a good person. Olivia tells him even though Claudia is evil, he should not have yelled at her in front of everybody.

Carly is found, along with her newborn baby girl, and is brought to the hospital, but there's no sign of Claudia. Dante comes with Lulu, suffering from hypothermia, and believes Sonny killed Claudia. When Olivia goes to visit Carly, she reveals she knew Claudia got Michael shot, causing a strain in their relationship. Olivia comforts Johnny, who figures his sister is dead. Johnny later confronts Olivia about Dominic being Dante, and is at an impasse about what to do. She finally admits Claudia blackmailed her into breaking up with him. Johnny chooses to stay with Olivia, finding it hard to be without her and vice versa. Still, she realizes she still carries a torch for Sonny.

Dante closes in on Sonny and finally gets enough evidence to produce an arrest warrant for Sonny in relation to Claudia's murder after Claudia's body is found in a warehouse explosion set by an obsessive artist. He tells his mother, though he wants Sonny to go down, he feels bad for his kids, who will be hit hard when their dad is sent to prison, as well as other people, including Lulu Spencer. Olivia immediately sees the sparks. She realizes Dante has genuine feelings for Lulu, something that has never happened to him before. Dante and Olivia end up spending Christmas at Sonny's house for dinner when his other three children bail on him. Olivia mends her relationship with Carly, as well, who admits she does not get along with a lot of women. Olivia admits the same.

Dante gets the arrest warrant for Sonny on the same day as Carly's daughter, Josslyn's, christening. The morning he decides he's going to arrest Sonny, Dante goes to Olivia's apartment and the two have a deep conversation. She tells him how afraid she was when she found out she was pregnant with him, barely a teenager with not a clue of how to be a mother. She tells him about his own christening, and he tells her he knows that she's always wanted to keep him safe. When Dante and Sonny do not show up at the christening, Olivia gets concerned and goes to Sonny's house. Olivia walks in to find Dante laying on the floor with a bullet in his chest and Sonny standing over him holding a gun. She screams at Sonny he just shot his own son as she tries to help Dante stay alive. Sonny helps out, as well, shocked and upset with Olivia for not telling him that Dante was his son. Dante is transported to the hospital, in a perilous state, and Olivia is shattered over the thought of losing her son. She tells Sonny she knows for sure he is Dante's father when he asks if there are any other possibilities. She says she was just trying to protect her son by not telling Dante or Sonny they were related. She sits by Dante's bedside, begging him to fight to stay alive. Sonny tries to recover from the shock of finding out Dante is his son, and lashes out at Olivia.

Dante goes into surgery, with Dr. Steven Webber doing the procedure. Before he comes out, Sonny is arrested for Claudia's murder. Dante wakes up on February 3, 2010, with Lulu by his side, who tells him Sonny is his father. When Olivia returns, Dante is upset Olivia did not tell him Sonny is his father and coldly pushes her away. She tries to defend her decision to keep his paternity a secret to protect him, but Dante will not listen. She is later brought down to the station to give her official statement on Dante's shooting, but she doesn't implicate Sonny. She only tells them she went to Sonny's house and found Dante lying on the floor. Dante gives his statement at the same time, saying he shot himself by accident.

When she goes back to the hospital, she finds Sonny, who wants to see Dante; as well as Lulu, who asks Olivia why she is allowing Sonny around Dante after what he did. Olivia tells Lulu the guilt from what Sonny did will eat him alive, and that will be punishment enough. When Ronnie, Dante's undercover partner, comes to the hospital to see Dante, he accuses Olivia of siding with Sonny over her own son. Olivia is furious. She tells Ronnie she loves her son more than he knows. Dante is his own man who makes his own decisions and there's nothing she can do about that.

=== 2010–2011 ===
On March 12, 2010, Dante's younger half-sister, Kristina Davis, is brutally beaten and hospitalized by her abusive boyfriend Kiefer Bauer, but tells the police it was Ethan Lovett who attacked her. Dante and his partner, Lucky Spencer, realize something is off and investigate, discovering on April 2 Kiefer, not Ethan, was the culprit. That same day, Kiefer beats up Kristina again. The truth comes out to everyone when Kristina's mother, Alexis, catches Kiefer leaving the house and Kristina confesses to Dante that Kiefer was the attacker. After a subsequent argument with Sonny, Dante finally realizes why Olivia lied about his paternity and forgives her. Unfortunately, Alexis accidentally hits and kills Kiefer with her car that same night. His father, Warren Bauer, swears revenge on both Alexis and Kristina, an act that would come back to haunt many Port Charles residents later, with Olivia not being an exception.

When Sonny's trial nears its end, the prosecutor, Claire Walsh, issues a subpoena for Michael to testify, thinking Michael's testimony will ensure Sonny's conviction. Dante then discovers Michael was really the one who killed Claudia, albeit to save Carly and Josslyn from her and turns him in just as the jury is about to announce their verdict. Olivia is present in the courtroom as all of this is unfolding. After Michael confesses, the judge unfairly sentences him to two-to-five years in the Pentonville Adult Correctional Facility to show everyone in the courtroom the legal system cannot be manipulated, much to the community's shock and outrage. And although Dante eventually gets Michael's sentence reduced significantly, Carly is still furious with Dante for urging Michael to turn himself in to the police in the first place. Olivia, believing in her son and that his intentions were true, defends her son to Carly and others who blame him for Michael's incarceration.

In June, Kristina, blaming Sonny for everything that happened to Michael, among many other things, decides to fake a relationship with Johnny to spite him. Johnny initially goes along with it, wanting badly to get back at Sonny for his sister's death and the way he treated her while she was still alive. This evidently ends up straining his relationship with Olivia, and even leads her to believe that what he has with Kristina is more than just an act to get back at Sonny. Eventually, Johnny realizes it's a bad idea, but Kristina continues to push the issue until July 2, when Johnny finally puts his foot down and convinces her to end the charade. The two are caught in a car bomb secretly planted by Sonny immediately afterwards, meant only for Johnny, but both survive.

On July 19, Olivia is at General Hospital and enters the waiting/conference room and encounters Warren Bauer trying to force Nurse Epiphany Johnson to give him Kristina's medical records. Olivia overhears the man berate Epiphany and insult Kristina. Despite Kristina's earlier antics, Olivia readily comes to the young girl's defense. When the hospital locks down after Franco kidnaps the newborn Aiden Cassadine, Warren suffers a psychotic break and induces a shootout, critically wounding Mac and Ethan Lovett before attempting to kill Kristina. He is shot dead by Mac before he can do more harm. Olivia subsequently helps Steven Webber, (who operated on Dante and saved his life) treat Ethan, which proves to save his life. The two start to form a bond during the lockdown, when Olivia gets a dizzy spell, and Steve is there to catch her from hitting the ground. After Steve performs Ethan's surgery, the two begin to talk and Olivia agrees to let Steve buy her a drink sometime, to thank her for helping save Ethan. When the lockdown ends, Olivia attempts reconcile with Johnny, whom she had broken things off with just a few days earlier due to his vow to destroy Sonny's organization to avenge Claudia. Using Warren's attempts at vengeance and subsequent death as an example of how the need for payback can destroy a person, but Johnny is unmoved.

On December 6, 2010, Olivia goes to Johnny's penthouse and finds Lisa Niles there. She had been treating Johnny's gunshot wound illegally, but hides the medical supplies so as to not get both of them into trouble. Johnny and Lisa both imply they are having sex to cover it up. Olivia pretends to believe their story. Once Lisa leaves, Olivia lets Johnny know that she can tell he's onto him, and asks why he would rather hurt her by leading her to believe he is with someone else than being injured again. Olivia asks Johnny to at least get up and kiss her goodbye, but as he can't stand, he gives an elaborate excuse as to why he won't. He says he was trying to give her a reason to walk away from his mob life. She tells him he won't live long enough to see how right they could have been together. She returns her set of keys to his apartment and leaves. She begins crying outside of his apartment. In late December 2010/early January 2011, Olivia, who was filling in for Carly, is among those caught in the ski resort bus crash and is one of those who takes the worst of it, suffering from internal bleeding. During the wait for rescue on the mountain, Olivia is found by Michael, who was also in the crash. Steve, having also been on the bus as a chaperone is the only uninjured doctor there, and stays firmly by Olivia's side, talking to her, trying to keep her awake, calm and as comfortable as possible. Olivia is admitted to the hospital in critical condition, and recovers. When Steve arrives to check on Olivia after she regains consciousness, she thanks him for saving her life on the mountain.

In late January, Steve takes Olivia home when she is released from the hospital, he makes her dinner and the two both confess that with more they get to know one another, the more they like each other. The two begin to date, often having dinner at Olivia's loft or meeting up at Jake's to have some drinks and spend time together. In February, they attended the wedding of Sonny Corinthos and Brenda Barrett together. On May 4, 2011, Steve and Olivia had sex for the first time. Olivia opens up to Steve, telling him she couldn't really tell before if he had been interested in her, and he explains that he didn't want to take advantage of her so soon after her break up with Johnny.

On July 27, 2011 Steve comes to Olivia's apartment for a date, bringing her flowers. While he's there, Olivia asks him about his time working at a hospital in Memphis and why he left and returned to Port Charles. Steve avoids answering her question and awkwardly changes the subject. Olivia seems suspicious, but doesn't question him any further. Over time, Steve is still showing signs of not wanting to discuss Memphis. On September 27, during a picnic on the roof of the hospital; Olivia mentions Memphis again and Steve tries to avoid the question by kissing her. Olivia tells Steve that she doesn't want secrets between them and asks him to tell her what happened in Memphis. Steve says that his time in Memphis was totally normal and that he isn't keeping any secrets from Olivia.

In September 2011, Olivia approaches Kate to try to get her to talk and help support Sonny with his recent divorce from Brenda. Kate refuses and the two get into an argument. Kate then goes and visits Sonny and makes up with Olivia. After that, Olivia helps Dante set up the night he plans to propose to Lulu and is worried frantically once he is brought into GH after being shot. On November 3, Olivia almost faints, which is a repeat of some other dizzy spells she had been having recently, and Lulu asks her if she might be pregnant. Olivia denies that there is any way she could be pregnant, and while she loves nothing more than being Dante's mother, she does not have any more unplanned babies in sight for her future. She then leaves so that she can go home and rest, but on the way there, obviously wondering the same as Lulu, buy a pregnancy test. While at home, Olivia is about to take the test when Steve arrives, and she quickly hides it behind a pillow, unsure of how to tell him that she believes she may be pregnant with his child. Olivia left the room, going to heat up some food for Steve, and while she's gone, Steve accidentally finds the test, and panics. He puts the test back where it was and makes an excuse to leave, clearly uneasy. Olivia, unaware that Steve saw the test, thinks nothing of it. Olivia then takes the test and right as she is about to look at the results, Sonny arrives interrupting her. When Steve finally confronted her at the hospital about finding the test, and tells her that she doesn't have to hide from him anymore that she is pregnant, she is shocked and tells him that she is not actually pregnant.

=== 2012 ===
In March 2012 after many suspicious altercations between Steve and Maggie Wurth, Steve's ex-girlfriend from Memphis who came to town to work as a pediatrician at GH; Olivia begins questioning Steve even further about what he has been hiding from her about his past in Memphis. He eventually realizes that he will lose Olivia if he doesn't tell her the truth about what happens. He confesses that he killed a prison in-mate who had been hospitalized and was in a coma in the hospital where Steve was working, because the patient's heart was a match for a young girl whose heart was failing and needed a transplant. At first, Olivia was disappointed in Steve's choice to play God with his patients, but knew that he was a good man, who made a wrong decision, and did have good intentions. Olivia then told him that she would keep his secret, and accidentally blurted out that she was in love with Steve, something neither of them had said before. Johnny, Olivia's ex had dug up the information about Steve killing his patient in Memphis and was using this to blackmail Steve. Olivia, worried about Steve losing his job, or going to prison, chose to defend Steve against Johnny, even going to Sonny when she felt she was out of other options, and asking him to get Johnny to back off.

In May, when Heather, Steve's mother, was released from Ferncliff and placed into her son's care, Olivia was right away suspicions that Heather was up to no good. Olivia picks up on Heather's strange behavior and thinks she is better off back in Ferncliff. Steve, who is so desperate to believe that his mother has changed and is a good person, does not see through her lies, and does not believe Olivia when she tells him that Heather is not as well as she seems. When all else fails, Olivia hires Damian Spinelli, a private investigator to look into Heather's misdoings. When Steve finds this out, he is angry, believing that Olivia is acting unfair towards his mother by labelling her as crazy, and their constant arguing and decides that he wants a break from their relationship. Olivia pleads with Steve that she is only trying to protect him from getting hurt by his mom again, and that she loves him. "I love you too, but this isn't working," he says, and walks away as tears stream down Olivia's face. Olivia, still clearly upset over her and Steve's break up, returns to work at the Metro Court and finds Heather in one of the rooms, disguised as a maid. The two argue, yet again and Heather pulls out a syringe that she states is filled with LSD. The two struggle, but Heather ends up stabbing Olivia with the LSD under the orders of Heather's boss and Monica and Sonny's enemy Cesar Faison, just as Dante bursts into the room, he hurriedly takes his mother to General Hospital, which allows Heather to get away. By the time Dante and Olivia arrive at GH, she is having terrifying hallucinations, and she picks up a scalpel, threatening to slit her own throat. Steve is able to talk Olivia down from killing herself by telling her that he finally believes her about his mother, that he's not going to let Heather hurt her again and that he loves her. Olivia, seeming somewhat calmer now, lowers the scalpel long enough for Dante to take it from her hand. She is then, still frantic, put into a straight jacket and taken to a room. Steve then tells Dante it's too soon to know if Olivia will recover from the LSD. Olivia is then sedated, but when she wakes up, continues having occasional hallucinations, almost all of which seem to be predicting what is going to happen in the future, or seeing the truth in things and people that no one else can see from the surface. As Olivia struggles through trying to get back into her life, and dealing with her strange visions, she gets support from Steve, who sticks by her side.

=== 2013—present ===
After arriving home from the Port Charles New Year's Eve party, Steve decides to kick the year off by proposing to Olivia. A tearful Olivia says yes to his proposal, and the two are looking forward to their future together. When Olivia's cousin Kate, who has been diagnosed with DID resurfaces after spending months trapped inside her head by her alter, Connie, Olivia supports her in realizing how long she had been gone for, and everything she had missed.

On Valentine's Day, Olivia had another hallucination, (which were getting more frequent) of Steve covered in blood, and appearing like he had just been stabbed. Olivia was terrified that something awful was going to happen to her fiancée, but he continually tried to convince her that she was stuck with him forever. On February 26, Olivia was alone when Heather, who had previously been presumed dead, showed up at her door with a butcher knife. She again blamed Olivia for turning Steve against her, and taking her son away from her. Heather and Olivia struggled again, and Heather slashed Olivia's arm with the knife. Just then, Steve came home from his shift at the hospital, and seeing what was going on between Olivia and his mother, demanded that Heather let Olivia go. "We don't need Olivia!" Heather yelled, as she was about to stab Olivia with the knife. Steve quickly jumped in between Olivia and Heather, the knife plunging into him instead, and Olivia caught him as he began to fall to the floor. Steve was rushed to the hospital, and into surgery as Olivia cried and desperately prayed for him to survive so that they could start their lives together. Steve ended up surviving the surgery, and Olivia was so happy that she didn't want to spend any more time only being Steve's fiancée and wanted to get married right away. She recruited Maxie Jones to plan her and Steve's ICU wedding over night, and showed up the next day in a wedding dress outside Steve's hospital room. On March 1, just before the two are about to be pronounced husband and wife, the wedding is interrupted by the Memphis police, who are there to arrest Steve for the murder of his patient. Olivia wants to act quickly and get Steve a lawyer so he can fight off the charges against him, but Steve's guilt gets the best of him and he decides he's going to confess. Olivia is heartbroken, and tells him that she never bargained on losing him and while she was going to miss him like crazy, she knew she had to accept his decision, and after saying their off-screen goodbyes, Steve was taken to prison in Memphis.

In June 2013, Olivia had a hallucination of seeing blood on Sonny's shirt at The Metro Court. She went to save him, and ended up getting shot by Ava Jerome, instead of the intended target, Franco (AKA Jerry Jacks' look-alike). Against the odds, Olivia survived and Sonny invited her to stay at his mansion to recuperate. This came at a time when Sonny had just been dumped by Kate (who was in the process of recovering from her DID and now officially going by the name of Connie), and Sonny and Olivia soon found themselves growing closer again, culminating in a kiss during the 4th of July celebrations. Before things could develop any further however, an oblivious Connie decided she wanted to reunite with Sonny. Olivia quietly stepped aside for the sake of her cousin's happiness, but was inwardly devastated that Sonny hadn't fought to be with her, and tensions grew between the two ladies. The matter hadn't fully been resolved when things took a sudden turn for a worse in August 2013, as Connie was shot fatally in her office. Having previously made an effort to stay away from Sonny, Olivia suddenly found herself having to step up to be his primary support, whilst grieving for her cousin herself. As A.J. Quartermaine was established as the prime suspect in Connie's murder, Olivia had to talk Sonny down from a suicide attempt and monitor him thereafter as he refused to take his bi-polar medication. Sonny eventually recovered from his relapse, but more family distress was to follow when it was revealed that their presumed newborn granddaughter, Connie Falconeri Jr, was actually the biological child of Maxie and Damien Spinelli rather than Dante and Lulu. As Olivia continued to support Sonny, the two gave in to their feelings and had sex for the first time since their teenage years.

After she and Sonny found out that Britt Westbourne's child is Dante and Lulu's, she and Sonny now have a grandson and Michael and Morgan have become the uncles. After that, A.J. found out that Ava Jerome shot Connie and not him.

In 2014, Olivia breaks up with Sonny when she finds out about his one-night-stand with Ava, and Olivia starts spending time with Ned Ashton for whom she develops feelings for. At the time, Ned is dating Alexis Davis and sees Olivia only as a good friend. On New Year's Eve sad on seeing Ned with Alexis, Olivia has a drunken one-night-stand with Julian Jerome who is also sad of seeing Alexis with Ned. On Valentine's Day 2015, Olivia finds out that she is pregnant with Julian's child. Ned breaks up with Alexis who returns to Julian, and starts a relationship with Olivia claiming the paternity of the unborn child. On May 8, 2015, Olivia gives birth to a premature baby boy, just after the Nurses Ball with the assistance of Patrick, Sam and Ned.

== Reception ==
In 2024, Charlie Mason from Soaps She Knows included Olivia in his list of the best mothers in American soap operas, writing that "Not only did Dante Falconeri's sensible mom keep him safely away from his made-man father for decades, she shielded son Leo with Julian Jerome from his dad's criminal activities as best she could, too."
