= Ethan Lovett =

- General Hospital character
- Christian Howard as Ethan Lovett
- Portrayed by: Nathan Dean (2009–2020, 2026); James Ryan (2023); Christian Howard (2026)
- Duration: 2009–2013; 2015; 2020; 2023; 2026
- First appearance: January 30, 2009
- Last appearance: August 4, 2026
- Created by: Robert Guza Jr.
- Introduced by: Jill Farren Phelps (2009); Frank Valentini (2013–2026)
- James Ryan as Ethan Lovett
In-universe information
- Occupation: Bartender; Caretaker
- Parents: Luke Spencer; Holly Sutton-Scorpio
- Adoptive parents: Frank Lovett; Carol Lovett
- Siblings: Lucky Spencer; Lulu Spencer; Sasha Gilmore
- Spouse: Maya Ward (2010–2011)
- Aunts and uncles: Pat Spencer; Bobbie Spencer
- Nieces and nephews: Cameron Webber; Jake Webber (legal); Aiden Spencer; Rocco Falconeri; Charlotte Cassadine
- First cousins: Valerie Spencer; Carly Corinthos; B. J. Jones (adoptive); Lucas Jones (adoptive)

Ethan Lovett is a fictional character from General Hospital, an American soap opera on the ABC network. The role was originated by Nathan Parsons, who appeared from January 30, 2009, to March 7, 2012. Parsons returned for guest appearances in April 2013 (as part of the soaps' 50th anniversary celebration), July 2015 and September 2020, respectively. In April 2023, the role was portrayed by James Ryan. In 2026, Parsons (now Nathan Dean) reprised the role when Ethan returned to Port Charles. He was replaced with Christian Howard, who assumed the role that same year.

== Casting ==
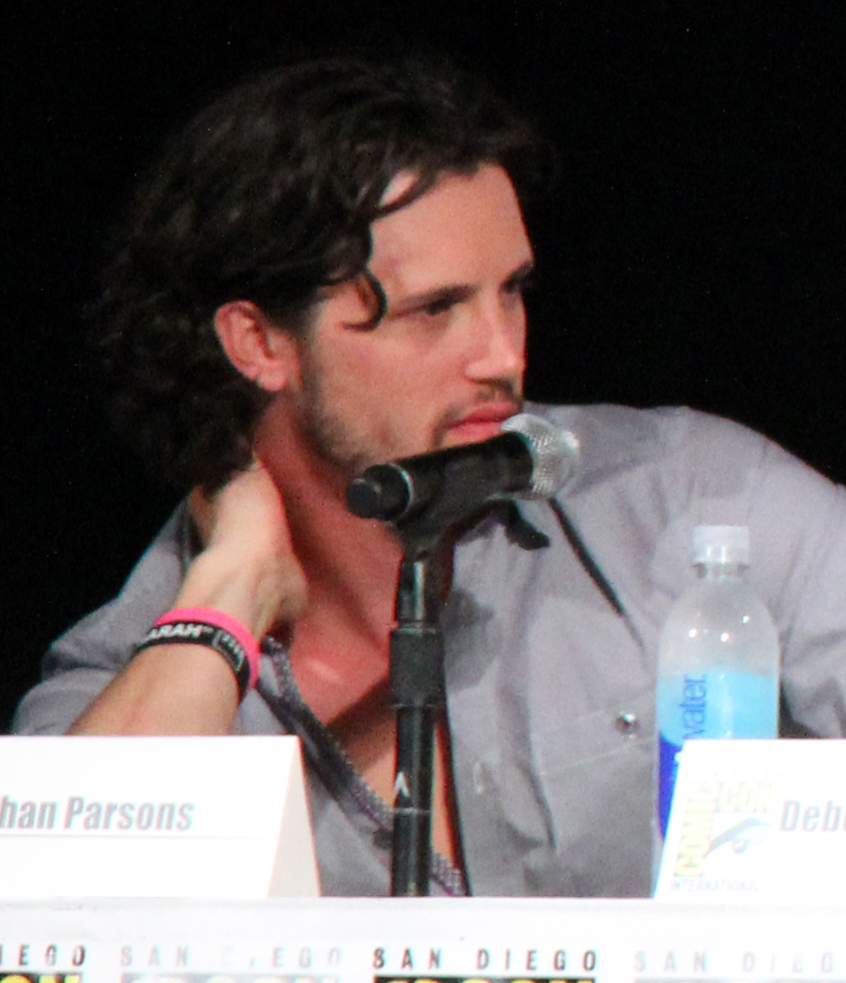
The role of Ethan was created for Nathan Parsons following his audition for the role of Dante Falconeri.

In 2008, General Hospital put out a casting call for an actor to play "Dante," the son of characters Sonny Corinthos (Maurice Benard) and Olivia Falconeri (Lisa Lo Cicero). Parsons auditioned for the role and was called back twice after the audition, but the show did not cast him as Dante. "They said they weren't going to give me the part I auditioned for, but they wanted me on the show, so they were going to write me in," Parsons said. The writers created the character Ethan Lovett specifically for the actor. "It's cool, because it gives me a completely clean slate for this character," he said. "Since it was written for me, I can play with it and make Ethan whoever I want him to be."

The character's debut story centered around the mystery of who his parents were. Headwriter Robert Guza Jr. hinted that Ethan would connect Luke Spencer's family to another family with whom they were once affiliated. The writers tied Ethan to established characters Luke Spencer (Geary), Holly Sutton (Samms), and Robert Scorpio (Tristan Rogers) — made household names during General Hospital's 1980s peak — with the question of whether or not he is Holly's son with one of the two men.

In November 2011, rumors began to surface that Parsons was considering exiting the series, which was effectively confirmed little over a month later following a tweet from co-star Julie Marie Berman. Parsons departed the series, following a three-year run, on March 7, 2012.

On April 2, 2013, Parsons reprised the role for two episodes as part of the series' 50th anniversary. In June 2015, Parsons, along with Jonathan Jackson, returned for a visit to facilitate the exit of Anthony Geary. On September 1, 2020, it was announced Parsons would again reprise the role in a guest appearance. He reprised the role from September 17 to 25, 2020. The role was recast with James Ryan, who debuted during the final moments of the April 17, 2023, episode, and exited the following episode on April 24.

On March 5, 2026, it was announced Parsons (now Nathan Dean) would return to the role. In a statement, executive producer Frank Valentini said, "We have a great story planned — with, of course, a few twists along the way." His return scenes aired on April 17. During the July 27 episode, Christian Howard assumed the role. Scenes regarding Dean's exit from the role aired three days earlier. He had previously revealed that he was initially approached about signing a three-year deal, which he was not interested in pursuing. Instead, Dean agreed to a four-month stint, with the possibility of an extension pending further discussion. Howard exited the role when Ethan departed during the August 4 episode.

== Storylines ==
=== 2009–2010 ===
Ethan is introduced in January 2009 attempting to burglarize the Haunted Star Casino. Owner Luke Spencer catches him. The two become acquainted. The Australian-born Ethan explains his parents died when he was 15 and he has been on his own since then. Eventually, it is revealed Ethan had actually sought out Luke. He had met one of Luke's former flames, thief and con-artist Holly Sutton, in his travels. Holly had told Ethan she had taught him all she knew and he should seek out master con-artist Luke Spencer, in America. Ethan secretly carried a photo Holly had given him of Luke and his longtime friend Robert Scorpio, who had been married to Holly.

It was Helena who would first say aloud Luke and Ethan had to be related due to the obvious similarity of the two men. Upon the revelation the Lovetts were actually his adoptive parents and he never knew his biological parents; Luke and his wife Tracy Quartermaine began to suspect Holly may be Ethan's mother and Luke could be his father. However, a DNA test on May 7, 2009, concludes Luke and Ethan are not related. Luke suspects Tracy may have altered the paternity test and enlists his daughter Lulu's help in proving this. Without telling her why, Luke asks Lulu to come on to Ethan in front of Tracy. Lulu goes so far as to kiss Ethan and Tracy becomes livid at the sight. Lulu later tells Tracy she plans to go out dancing with Ethan and may end the evening by having sex with him. Only then does Tracy admit Ethan may be Lulu's brother and she doctored the DNA results in order to get Holly's son to leave town. Holly returns, confirming she is Ethan's mother and initially revealing Robert as his father on May 22, 2009. After Robert's daughter Robin tells Ethan that Robert was in Port Charles and not with Holly when Ethan would have been conceived, Holly confesses to Luke on May 29, 2009 Ethan is in fact his son.

Ethan initially has a somewhat tense relationship with his older half-brother Lucky Spencer. He quickly becomes close with his younger half-sister, Lulu Spencer, whom he had formerly pursued romantically to no avail (thankfully). (It is revealed on Sept 30, 2009 Ethan is older than Lulu.) In June, Luke Spencer goes missing, but was actually taken by Helena Cassadine. Ethan is concerned but is reassured by his siblings Luke often disappears on an adventure without warning. On Sept. 30, 2009, Ethan and Lulu separately receive text messages they believe to be from their dad. They both head to the Haunted Star, where they end up discussing the situation. They leave together for Greece and find him held against his will on Cassadine Island. They rescue both Luke and Helena with the help of nurse Mischa, then return to Port Charles. Luke promises he won't ever leave Ethan without letting him know. Before he was kidnapped, Luke and Ethan sent in a paternity test which Tracy didn't know about. Ethan lets Luke know the DNA test confirms they are father and son.

On June 5, 2009, Ethan was revealed to be conspiring and romantically involved with Rebecca Shaw, a newly arrived lookalike of the deceased Emily Quartermaine. After discovering Rebecca's deception, Prince Nikolas Cassadine discloses to Ethan he has a plan to retaliate against Rebecca. She arrived in Port Charles planning to use her resemblance to Emily to endear herself to Nikolas and the Quartermaines. The plan was to then bilk them of money (a plot she concocted with Ethan). Nikolas says he is going to win her heart, then dump her. This outrages Ethan, who wants to be with Rebecca himself. As Nikolas said would happen, nobody believes Ethan when he tries to reveal what Nikolas is up to. On Nov. 16, 2009, Ethan appeals to Elizabeth Webber for help in talking Nikolas out of hurting Rebecca. Elizabeth, having a secret affair with Nikolas, tells him Rebecca deserves what she gets. Rebecca leaves Port Charles right before Christmas. She doesn't let Ethan know until she is at the airport. After the affair between Nikolas and Elizabeth is revealed, Lulu yells at Elizabeth in the hospital nurses station. Ethan is there and he learns Rebecca left because she learned of Nikolas's affair with Elizabeth.

Ethan happens across Michael Corinthos III (his cousin) having an argument with Kristina Davis on the docks. He tells Michael to ease up. Michael leaves, but not before he tells Ethan off, saying he should be more careful about what strangers he talks so boldly to because he'll live longer. Kristina thanks Ethan, who asks what happened to her face and she says she tripped. Kristina, who appears to have a crush on Ethan, compliments his singing karaoke at the "nonwedding" party for Maxie Jones and Damian Spinelli. She also asks for his number in case she needs his help again. He programs it into her phone.

On November 25, 2009, Ethan runs into Kristina at Kelly's as he is about to get a turkey burger. They flirt again, and talk about American and Australian Thanksgiving. She reminds him holidays are for family, which convinces him to spend it with his family. He walks her to Robin Scorpio's and then arrives at the Quartermaine mansion, where he celebrates with Luke, Lulu, Tracy, Monica, Edward, Alice and Rebecca. In keeping with the dysfunctional Quartermaine family's holiday tradition, they all share pizza.

Ethan spends December 16, 2009 at Alexis Davis's house with Kristina, her sister Molly, family friend Diane, and Kristina's overly jealous boyfriend, Keifer Bauer. Kristina, and all of the females, enjoy having him there. Keifer leaves jealous and angry and she realizes he was her guest. Ethan spends Christmas Eve with Luke, Tracy, Lucky, Lulu, Dante, Elizabeth, Nikolas, Cameron, Jake and Spencer and he reads to the boys The Night Before Christmas as Lucky puts Laura Spencer's angel on top of the tree.

Since New Year's, Ethan has protected Kristina from her boyfriend Keifer on numerous occasions. He also promised to teach her how to play poker. He took Mike Corbin to the hospital after finding him beaten in an alley, tried to comfort Elizabeth after Lulu verbally attacks her at the hospital, went to baby cousin Josslyn Jacks's christening with his family and enjoyed the ceremony, and comforted his sister Lulu after her boyfriend Dante Falconeri is shot.

=== 2010–2011 ===
In February 2010, Ethan finds Elizabeth at the Haunted Star and realizes how hurt and angry she is. He tries to help. He then goes to Wyndemere, asked over by Nikolas. After bantering back and forth, learns Elizabeth was raped when she was 15. Trying to put her life back together is what began her love with Lucky. Later he shows up at Kelly's in time to yell at Kiefer, waits as Kristina stands up for herself. He leaves after being invited for coffee with Kristina on his arm.

Johnny Zacchara, who has been trying to take down Sonny Corinthos' organization from the inside, prompts Ethan with an offer to be his sidekick in exchange for a 50/50 split of the profits. Ethan has yet to make a firm decision, but is obviously swayed by the offer. This is much to the disapproval of Luke, Tracy and Lucky. They think if Ethan gets caught up in this, he will end up getting hurt or possibly killed. Luke has repeatedly tried to change his mind. Lucky, in an attempt to keep Ethan safe, threatens to arrest him for an expired visa and have him deported back to Australia.

Luke stops Lucky from doing this. He and Ethan come up with a plan to get Ethan a green card. Luke involves Tracy in their plan. They decide Ethan needs to get his green card quick. The best way to do that is to get him married. On March 8, 2010, in a twist of events Tracy offers to become Ethan's wife. Ethan and Luke aren't game. When Tracy sees how upset Luke gets about them getting divorced and her marrying his son, she becomes amused. Ethan then becomes amused as well. He agrees with Tracy they should get married.

In March 2010, Ethan started dating Bernie Abrahms secretary Jennifer Biles (starting out by helping Johnny), causing Kristina to get jealous. On March 11, 2010 Kristina blows off a date with Kiefer and has Molly hack into Ethan and Jennifer's e-mails to cancel their date. She shows up at the Haunted Star all dressed up trying to get Ethan's attention, He forcefully gets through to her by grabbing and bruising her arm, to leave him alone. He later shows up at the Lake House to apologize. He finds Kristina beaten and bloody on the floor, and rushes her to General Hospital. Lucky and Sonny question her at the hospital about who is responsible. She lies and says it was Ethan. Ethan is arrested on March 16, 2010, but is bailed out by his step-mother Tracy Quartermaine. Sam attacked Ethan on March 18, 2010 but he does not fight back, as he won't hit a woman. On March 22, 2010 he visits Kristina to find out why she pointed out him, only to be caught by Sam. He is arrested again by Lucky. He is then given support by his father Luke. The charges are dropped on March 26. Ethan is released, but nonetheless shunned by most of Port Charles for his alleged attack on Kristina. He is only stopped from leaving town by Luke's insistence he wait for Lucky and Dante to look into Kristina's accusations. On April 2, Lucky and Dante realize Kristina is lying to protect Keifer from Sonny's wrath. (She had also figured naming Ethan would not get him killed since his father, Luke, is Sonny's old and dear friend.) On April 6, 2010, Ethan is notified by Lucky he is clear of assault charges. However, he is now a suspect in the hit and run of Kiefer Bauer and thrown in jail. On April 11, 2010, the charges against Ethan are dropped when Alexis Davis confesses to running down Keifer Bauer, giving Ethan an opportunity for a fresh start. Nonetheless, Ethan is understandably frustrated people keep accusing him of things. Ethan forgives Kristina after she apologizes profusely for the events of the recent past. They agree to be friends.

Ethan has been working for Johnny, trying to help in his mob dealings. He is more interested in the money than the danger and possible death. He and Johnny have become friends and confidants, as well as business associates. Meanwhile, Kristina has confided in Ethan about her abuse counseling, her therapy sessions, and her life as Sonny's daughter. Whenever they talk, he always listens and provides her with insight and support. Despite the events of the past and the obvious differences between them, Ethan and Kristina do become friends. While trying to assert her independence from her domineering mobster father Sonny, Kristina convinced Johnny they should pretend to date, which he knows isn't a good idea; but does drive her father (and mother) nuts. On June 16, 2010, it proved to make Ethan a bit jealous, although he tried to hide it, and he has tried convincing Kristina it is not a good idea. After a bomb was planted in Johnny's car by Sonny, which could have killed Kristina, it is Ethan who convinces Johnny to lie to the police about who planted the bomb. Ethan reasons Johnny owes it to Kristina not to name her father since Johnny shouldn't have been pretending to date her.

Ethan stands at the nurse's hub with Maya Ward when Kristina Davis runs into the lobby yelling. Ethan, Lucky and Maya all run after her, and stop her brother Michael from choking Warren Bauer. He demands Lucky arrest Michael, who is on parole. All present state Michael had merely helped him up, which makes Bauer even angrier. Ethan returns to the hub with Maya, and is soon after shot by Mr. Bauer, along with Mac Scorpio, after Bauer walked into the hospital lobby and opened fire. Bauer then attempts to shoot Kristina, whom he blames for his son Keifer's death. Michael protects Kristina by standing between her and Bauer. Mac Scorpio manages to fire off a shot at Bauer. Ethan has been shot in the neck and Steven needs Maya's help to save him, but she freezes and is unable to help at all. Ethan is saved by Steven and Olivia Falconeri. He woke up soon after, with Maya by his side, who blamed herself for him almost dying. Kristina came to visit him, along with Carly and Michael. She feels everything is her fault. He reassures her he does not blame her. She he tells him she's glad he didn't die. She intends to keep him in her life for a very long time.

As Kristina stands outside Johnny's hospital room (after he was shot by Sonny), Ethan finds her and reminds her it is not her fault and everyone has their good and bad parts of life. Although he reminds her he is, after all, a con and a thief; she says he's genuinely good, and he is her hero. Later, he sees Kristina outside of Kelly's and they chat while he waits for Maya.

In February 2011, Ethan is called to Kelly's by his father Luke Spencer as he is going to Sonny's wedding but has no one to help at the diner. Ethan tries to get out of it, but starts helping. Kristina shows up with Molly, dressed as a bridesmaids and talks with Ethan, and invites him to the wedding. He quickly tells his father he can't help, and leaves to change. He arrives with Luke and Lulu, and compliments Kristina. When Kristina gets to the altar she looks around and smiles at Ethan, which he returns with a grin. His father, Luke, notes this and is not amused. He has continued to remind Ethan, just last year, this is the "same little girl that accused him of beating the hell out of her". At the reception, Ethan tells Kristina he doesn't remember much about his own wedding to Maya in Las Vegas since they were drunk and married by accident. He later offers her his hand to dance with him. This did not go unnoticed by her father, nor his. While dancing at the reception, Kristina informs Ethan she plans to marry him one day. Ethan thinks this is hilarious and she is just joking. After the wedding, Sam is caught in a car bomb, which was a decoy for the Balkan to capture Brenda. Ethan shielded Kristina, Molly and Morgan from the bomb blast and made the decision to take the children back to Alexis' lake house. He stays with Kristina and Molly at Alexis' house while she deals with Sam, and does his best to comfort the two. While there, it became evident to him Kristina was interested in him romantically once again and he tries to dissuade her. She falls asleep with her head on Ethan's shoulder.

At the Quatermaine's, Ethan follows Maya out to the boat-house after she prevents Edward from calling the police on him for theft. He learns she is helping her little cousin, Michael Corinthos, hiding out from the cops. He tells her if she's looking for a 'Bad Boy', he's 'right here. It would be a shame to waste' him.

Maya is sent to Luke's by Edward to tell him he and Ethan are not welcome at the Quatermaine mansion in Tracy's absence. While in Luke's office, Ethan attempts to rope Maya into one of his cover stories. She calls him out on it. Luke laughs and tells Ethan he's met his match. Later that day, Ethan and Johnny go to Jake's to celebrate a move on Sonny. Ethan accidentally spills Maya's drink on her. After Brooklyn Aston's karaoke solo, Ethan tells Maya he's kinda in the Mob. She gets upset, then leaves.

While in Luke's office, Johnny Zacchara stops by for Ethan. He also reveals Ethan likes Maya. She assures him the feeling isn't mutual. Over a flirty card game, Ethan asks Maya why she's so hostile to him. She has to admit he's a pretty decent guy. He then spends the next couple of months coming up with excuses to run into her. At Jake's one night, he asks her again why she's so determined to hate him. Maya informs him he reminds her of an ex. Ethan then asks if her ex was mean to her. She said he was wonderful to her, but he took too many risks. She was just starting out as a doctor. While doing her usual rotation in the ER, he was admitted with a GSW (gunshot wound). Maya froze when she saw him. Her boyfriend had already lost too much blood to be saved. According to Maya, he never regained consciousness, and died in the hospital. On the July 22 episode. Ethan was shot. Maya was unable to assist him. She had frozen with memories of her ex-boyfriend. She stays by his side. He helps her through her 'crisis of confidence' about being a doctor. Tracy takes Ethan back to the mansion to recuperate. Maya avoids him. Ethan eventually corners Maya at Kelly's and asks for some insight into her mind. She admits she can't stop thinking about him. She's conflicted then runs off. Ethan goes to General Hospital later that day. After months of flirting with one another, Maya and Ethan share their first kiss.

The two start dating. Ethan asks Maya for help in getting Tracy and Luke back together. Luke had revealed their marriage is a fraud. Luke fakes a heart attack. Maya fakes his test results. Tracy seems to be falling for their plan but it backfires, when she secretly discovers what's going on. As part of the scam, Ethan reveals the truth to Tracy. Everything is out in the open. Luke then convinces Tracy to go to Vegas with him, with Maya and Ethan as chaperones. Tracy agrees, makes no promises of marriage. She blackmails Maya into coming by threatening to tell about her falsifying medical records. In November 2010, the four wake up with hangovers in a Las Vegas hotel room. Tracy and Luke had gotten too drunk to control. Luke reveals a marriage certificate thinking it's his and Tracy's. It actually belongs to Maya and Ethan, the couple who got married instead. Luke and Tracy search for a mobile attorney to get the marriage annulled. Maya and Ethan hang out at casino. Maya wins big in Black Jack. They retreat to the hotel room and have sex for the first time. The attorney Tracy finds tells them they can still get an annulment even though they had sex repeatedly. The fact they were very drunk when they married one another is grounds enough. They choose to wait on the annulment, and enjoy the perks of marriage for a little while longer. Upon their return to Port Charles, Ethan texts Lulu about his nuptials and asks her to 'break the news to Edward since he has a soft spot for her. At the mansion, he carries Maya over the threshold and says it's a tradition. They smooch. Luke complains that should be him and Tracy. Lulu storms in saying there's no way Ethan and Maya got married. Edward reflects on his affair with Mary Mae. He states they couldn't last for all sorts of reasons, Maya and Ethan don't have any of those obstacles. He gets Ethan and Maya admit they feel something for each other. Edward offers them $1 million tax-free, to stay married for one full year. Maya rejects Edward's million dollar offer. Lulu encourages her brother to do the same. However, Ethan agrees. Maya wants to know what the catch is. Edward says there is none. They can stay together or break up after a year - no strings attached. Edward reminds her they could have annulled their marriage in Vegas, but didn't. Maya eventually agrees when Ethan points out she can use the money to pay off her student loans and help her sister.

=== 2011–2013, 2015, 2020 ===
In June 2011, Ethan visits Maya in Philadelphia, PA and discovered her in bed with another man. She later told Ethan she had been lying to him for a while. She had no plans to return to Port Charles. Afterwards, Ethan and Maya decided the marriage was over and parted amicably. On June 9, Ethan flew down to the Dominican Republic to obtain a divorce.

As Kristina's romantic feelings on Ethan re-emerged, she began to openly pursue him. Ethan's mixed signals towards Kristina for several months only compounded the problem, especially when he made his marriage to Maya seem like it was simply a business arrangement. This became an issue when Kristina boarded a plane to accompany Ethan to the Dominican Republic on June 9 so he could obtain a quickie divorce from Maya, which led to her father contemplating Ethan's murder when he discovered their trip to the Dominican Republic (with Alexis and Sonny assuming they were going to get married). After a few days of fun in the sun and a humorous mix-up in the divorce officiator's office, her parents escorted the two back to Port Charles.

Sonny, in particular, seems especially against Ethan having any sort of relationship with his daughter and has threatened Ethan's life numerous times in order to reinforce that belief. Ethan, however, has been adamant about continuing his association with Kristina, with or without Sonny's approval. In a discussion about Ethan and Kristina's relationship, Alexis pointed out to Sonny he had no problem with his son living with a woman ten years his senior, which led to Sonny's retort Michael's situation with Abby was different because Michael was "a boy."

Their trip to the Dominican Republic only stoked the flames of Kristina's desire to be with Ethan. On June 24, under the guise of planning a trip abroad for a college class, Kristina invites Ethan to the Lake House, where she created a romantic setting and flirted with him and, ultimately, kissing him upon Ethan's invitation to see if she still has feelings for him once they have kissed. After the kiss, Kristina informs Ethan she still has romantic feelings for him, but their conversation is interrupted by Alexis and Molly coming home. Months later, Kristina was accosted by Anthony Zacchara, who threatened her as a means to get to Sonny. Ethan intervened, much to her relief, and turned Anthony away, causing Kristina to become grateful to Ethan. Ethan went to see Michael about Kristina's feelings towards him, but Michael pointed out Ethan did little to dissuade her romantic feelings for him for several months. Afterwards, Ethan, Michael, and Abby formulated a plan that involved Ethan feigning interest in Abby in order to get Kristina to move on from Ethan. Kristina was not fooled by the deception, however.

After several months of sending Kristina mixed signals about their relationship, Ethan finally told Kristina on July 7 about her skewed perceptions about the two of them together. Kristina, while taken aback, is nonetheless determined to prove Ethan does, in fact, care about her. In an attempt to protect Ethan, Kristina goes to see Johnny Zacchara, Ethan's employer and friend, with the request he fire Ethan in an attempt to get him out of harm's way. Throughout all of this, Ethan himself has shown on numerous occasions he could also be developing feelings for her, albeit conflicted, through the actions which he has taken in Kristina's honor, i.e. protecting her with an intensity that eventually caused Johnny to urge him to admit he likes her. Johnny, in particular, calls Ethan out on having feelings for Kristina, and fires him.

The following year, Helena would reveal to a captive Luke and Ethan that "Cassandra" was actually Irina Cassadine, her secret daughter she had kept captive on her island in Greece. Helena then ordered Irina to shoot Ethan because he is Luke's son and it was Luke who killed her beloved son, Stavros. Irina would instead turn the gun on her mother, Helena. She would fire the gun, but the gun was empty. Irina, having failed her mother's test of loyalty, would pay with her life. Helena, very cold-heartedly, told her henchmen to "kill her." Irina would die on the floor of the Library at Wyndmere with a heartbroken Ethan holding her. Then Helena ordered Ethan be shot with Luke watching his son die. Ethan's mother, Holly, surprisingly appears and reveals to Helena, Luke, and Ethan that Ethan is not even Luke's son and therefore should be spared. Holly says Ethan is actually Robert Scorpio's son and claims the DNA tests proving him to be Luke's son were doctored. Helena then decides to postpone Ethan's execution until she verifies whether or not Holly is telling the truth. Once Helena leaves, Holly confesses to Luke and Ethan she fabricated the fake paternity story to save Ethan's life and he is, without any doubt, Luke's son.

Later, Luke finds Robert on the ledge of a bridge about to jump into a canyon and commit suicide. Robert is distraught over the tragic accidental death of his only child, Robin. In an effort to save his best friend and give him a purpose to continue living, Luke lies to Robert by telling him Ethan is Robert's son, not his. Luke also tells him Helena has taken Ethan captive and he needs to be rescued immediately. Shortly after, at Luke's request, Ethan decides to leave town and "disappear for a while" to keep the lie believable for Robert's sake. Luke would point out to Holly if Ethan leaves town it would also keep him out of Helena's grasp when she discovers he really is Luke's son. Reluctantly, they agree Ethan leaving would be the best solution for all concerned. On March 7, Ethan says goodbye to his parents, Luke and Holly, in the library at Wyndemere and leaves via the library's secret passageway that leads to the tunnels of Spoon Island. Then Robert and Holly quickly leave town in pursuit of "their" son, Ethan, and his supposed captor, Helena Cassadine.

Helena causes Ethan to be found by Luke and Laura on the Haunted Star in the Atlantic Ocean as a distraction for the couple during the search for their daughter Lulu. Ethan is captured by Helena while staying at Lucky's place in Dublin while he is working in Africa.

Ethan shows up in Monte Carlo surprising Olivia Quartermaine (Lisa LoCicero) and Robert Scorpio (Tristan Rogers). After talking with Olivia, he punches Robert in the face to get the attention of management so that they could go into the back where they think Holly Sutton-Scorpio (Emma Samms) may be being held captive. As they are tied up, they free themselves only for Winston Rudge (David S. Lee) to walk in on them with a gun revealing that he knows Robert.

== Reception ==
The character of "charismatic drifter/grifter" Ethan was initially a recurring role, but Parsons was soon put on contract with the series. In March 2009 Soaps In Depth magazine credited Parsons with "taking the show by storm" and dubbed Ethan "one of daytime's most riveting young characters."

Controversy surrounded the actor and the character when it was revealed Ethan was a product of an affair between Luke Spencer and Holly Sutton. "I was tremendously disliked for that! [Laughs] I was a dagger in the heart of all the Luke and Laura fans! They didn't want to believe Luke done such a thing during his legendary romance with Laura. And I don't blame them. It wasn't my fault, but I took a lot of heat."

Charlie Mason and Richard Simms from Soaps She Knows called the 2023 recasting of Ethan the "Most Pointless Recast" in American soap operas of that year, commenting that they had "barely gotten a glimpse of General Hospital's new Ethan — let alone adjusted to him suddenly being blond — when Holly and Luke's son left on a new adventure".
