= Nathan Parsons =

American actor (born 1988)

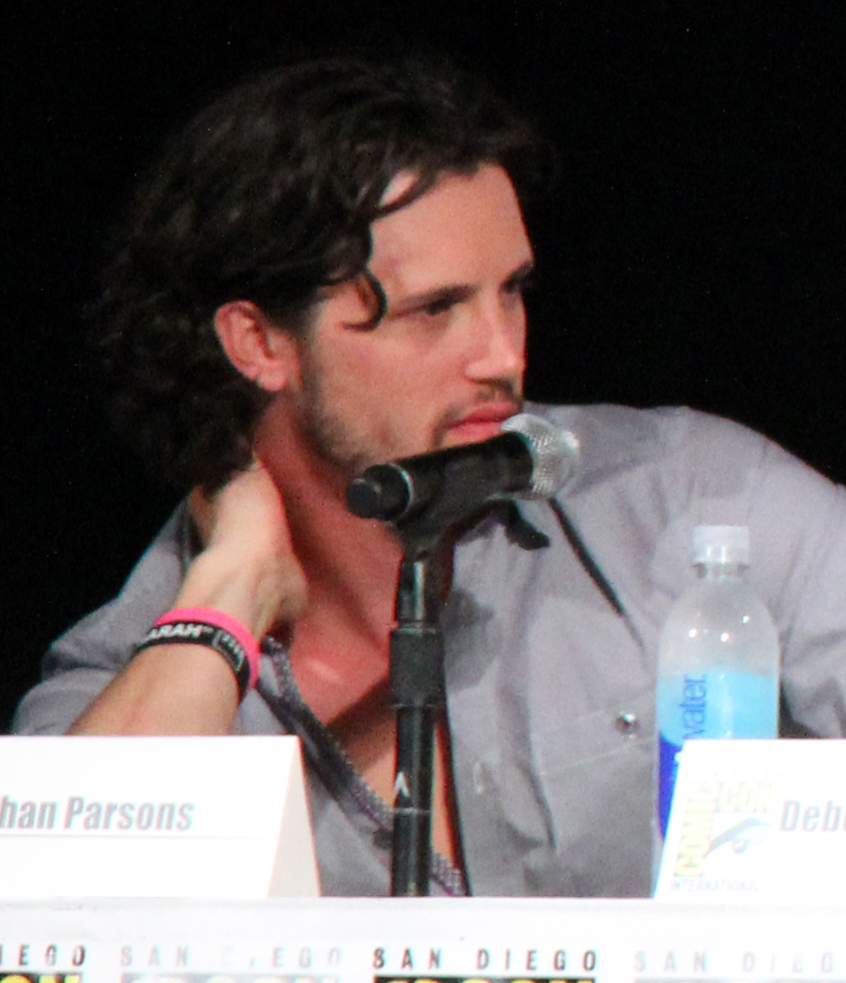
- Parsons at the 2014 San Diego Comic Con
- Born: Nathan Dean Parsons; June 16, 1988 (age 38); Adelaide, Australia
- Occupation: Actor
- Years active: 1991–present
- Children: 2

Nathan Dean Parsons (born June 16, 1988), also known as Nathan Dean, is an American actor known for his work in daytime television on the ABC daytime soap opera General Hospital as the character of Ethan Lovett. He has also had roles on primetime television shows, as vampire James Kent on the seventh and final season of the HBO drama series True Blood, and the role of exiled werewolf Jackson Kenner on the CW drama series The Originals. He has also appeared on Once Upon a Time as Hansel / Jack /Nick Branson and portrayed Max Evans in the CW series Roswell, New Mexico.

== Early life and education ==
Nathan Parsons was born in Adelaide, South Australia, but raised in Boulder, Colorado, and Austin, Texas. He moved to Los Angeles to attend the University of Southern California after being accepted into their Bachelor of Fine Arts Acting program, but dropped out after three semesters. He is also a member of Boom Kat Dance Theatre, a non-profit dance company based in Santa Monica, California. Boom Kat has been made a resident company of the Miles Memorial Playhouse (in Santa Monica) following the success of their third production, NeverWonderland.

== Career ==
=== Early works ===
As a child actor, he did voice-over work dubbing Japanese anime for ADV Films, including the lead role of Jean Roque-Raltique in Nadia: The Secret of Blue Water and parts in Soul Hunter, Devil Lady and Jing: King of Bandits. Parsons has previously appeared in the films Teeth (2007) and The Brotherhood V: Alumni (2009).

=== General Hospital ===
Parsons originally auditioned for a different role on General Hospital and was not cast, but the series subsequently created a new character for him. He made his first appearance as con artist Ethan Lovett on January 30, 2009. Parsons was initially hired on a recurring basis but was soon put on contract with the series, working closely with multi-Daytime Emmy Award-winner Anthony Geary. Parsons's debut storyline hinted at the secret parentage of his character Ethan, who was later established as the son of Luke Spencer (Geary) and Holly Sutton (Emma Samms), characters made household names during General Hospital's 1980s peak. In March 2009, Soaps In Depth magazine credited Parsons with "taking the show by storm" and dubbed Ethan "one of daytime's most riveting young characters."

In December 2011, Parsons announced that he had decided not to renew his contract with General Hospital (which was expiring in early 2012). His last airdate was March 7, 2012, in a final scene that was shared with his on-screen parents, Anthony Geary and Emma Samms. The storyline was left open-ended for his possible return.

In May 2012, Parsons was nominated for a Daytime Emmy Award in the Outstanding Younger Actor category for his portrayal of Ethan Lovett on General Hospital. The 2012 Daytime Emmy Awards were televised live on June 23, 2012, from the Beverly Hilton Hotel in Beverly Hills, California. Though Parsons did not win in this category, he was prominently featured in the telecast as a presenter for the coveted Outstanding Lead Actor category, in which his former co-stars, Anthony Geary and Maurice Benard, were both nominated. Parsons presented the award to his former on-screen father, Anthony Geary (for an unprecedented 7th win), and was acknowledged in Geary's acceptance speech. General Hospital also won the Outstanding Drama Series award.

In April 2013, Parsons returned to General Hospital as Ethan Lovett as part of the show's 50th Anniversary Celebration. His return aired over two days, April 2 and 3, in which he appeared with Anthony Geary (Luke Spencer), Genie Francis (Laura Spencer) and Constance Towers (Helena Cassadine). He also reprised his character again in July 2015 for two episodes.

On March 3, 2026, it was announced Parsons would be reprising his role as Ethan Lovett.

=== Bunheads ===
Parsons debuted on Bunheads on July 16, 2012, in an episode entitled "Money for Nothing", which introduced his character of Godot. While Godot was well known and idolized by the "bunheads", the lead character of Michelle (Sutton Foster) had never met him, as he had only just returned from a year-long surfing trip. There was a brief, but instant rapport between Michelle and Godot; a relationship that was played out through season 1. He went on to appear in another six episodes through the show's first and only season.

=== 2014 to present ===
Parsons replaced Luke Grimes as James in the final season of True Blood and appeared on The Originals as Jackson Kenner from 2014 to 2018.

In March 2018, Parsons was cast as Max Evans in The CW series Roswell, New Mexico.

== Filmography ==
=== Film ===
Year	Title	Role	Notes
1991–1992	Nadia: The Secret of Blue Water	Jean	Voice role (English version by ADV Films; 2001–2002)
1998	Devilman Lady	Kid	Voice role (English version)
2002	Jing: King of Bandits	Angostura	Voice role (English version)
2007	Teeth	Soda Spritzer	
2009	The Brotherhood V	Holden Williams	
2011	The Roommate	Coffee Shop Cashier	
2016	Pet	Eric	
2016	Late Bloomer	Shane Rutherford / Mr. Rutherford	
2017	Justice	James McCord	
2019	Heart of Texas	Ryan	
2020	I Still Believe	Jean-Luc La Joie	

=== Television ===
Year	Title	Role	Notes
1999–2000	Nadia: The Secret of Blue Water	Jean	Main voice role (English version)
2009–2012, 2013, 2015, 2020, 2026	General Hospital	Ethan Lovett	Series regular: January 30, 2009 – March 7, 2012; Guest: April 2–3, 2013, July 2015, September 2020
2011	State of Georgia	Doug	Episode: "Know When to Fold 'em"
2012–2013	Bunheads	Godot	Recurring role
2013	The Nightmare Nanny	Jake	TV movie
2014	Complete Works	Fantasy Shakespeare	Episode: "The Green-Eyed Monster"
2014–2018	The Originals	Jackson Kenner	Recurring role
2014	True Blood	James Kent	Main role (season 7)
2015	Point of Honor	John Rhodes	TV movie
2016	Rosewood	Nip-Tuck	Episode: "Tree Toxins & Three Stories"
2016	Late Bloomer	Shane Rutherford	TV movie
2017–2018	Once Upon a Time	Hansel / Jack / Nick Branson	Recurring role (season 7)
2019	A Feeling of Home	Ryan	TV movie
2019–2022	Roswell, New Mexico	Max Evans	Main role

== Awards ==
Year	Association	Category	Nominated work	Result
2012	Daytime Emmy Awards	Outstanding Younger Actor in a Drama Series	General Hospital	Nominated
