= Alexis Davis (General Hospital) =

Fictional character from General Hospital

- General Hospital character
- Nancy Lee Grahn as Alexis Davis
- Portrayed by: Nancy Lee Grahn (1996–present); Susan Diol (2001–2002); Kristen Erickson (2006); Gable Swanlund (2021); Stephanie Erb (2022)
- Duration: 1996–present
- First appearance: September 26, 1996
- Created by: Richard Culliton and Karen Harris
- Introduced by: Wendy Riche
- Book appearances: The Secret Life of Damian Spinelli
- Spin-off appearances: Port Charles
In-universe information
- Other names: Natasha Alexandra Mikkosovna Cassadine; Alexis Davidovitch; Kristina Cassadine; Dobson; Alexis Jacks; Alexis Lansing
- Occupation: Attorney; District Attorney; Editor-in-chief; Butler (as "Dobson"); Princess of Greek nobility (abdicated)
- Family: Cassadine
- Parents: Mikkos Cassadine; Kristin Bergman
- Stepmother: Helena Cassadine
- Sisters: Kristina Cassadine
- Half-brothers: Stavros Cassadine; Stefan Cassadine
- Spouse: Jasper Jacks (1999–2000); Ric Lansing (2004–2006); Julian Jerome (2016)
- Daughters: Sam McCall; Kristina Davis; Molly Lansing
- Grandsons: Danny Morgan
- Granddaughters: Lila McCall; Scout Cain; Irene Davis-Ashford
- Grandfathers: Ivan Cassadine
- Uncles: Victor Cassadine; Tony Cassadine
- Aunts: Sophia Cassadine-Davidovitch
- Nephews: Nikolas Cassadine
- First cousins: Valentin Cassadine
- Other relatives: Spencer Cassadine; Charlotte Cassadine; Petros Cassadine; Dimitri Cassadine; Ace Cassadine

Alexis Davis is a fictional character on the ABC soap opera, General Hospital. Nancy Lee Grahn originated the role on September 26, 1996. She is the daughter of Mikkos Cassadine and Kristin Bergman. She is also the mother of Sam McCall, Kristina Davis and Molly Lansing.

== Casting ==
Nancy Lee Grahn, known for her Emmy winning portrayal of Julia Wainwright on Santa Barbara, made her first appearance as Alexis on September 26, 1996, on a recurring basis. In 1997, Grahn was put on contract with the series due to her popularity among fans. Susan Diol temporarily played the role from November 2001 to March 2002, when Grahn's father died. In 2010, Grahn announced she had renewed her contract for an additional four years. On April 8, 2021, Gable Swanlund portrayed the role of a younger Alexis in flashbacks during a special episode centred on Alexis. Stephanie Erb portrayed the role temporarily in 2022 when Grahn was recovering from surgery.

== Development ==
In 2004, Alexis begins dating Ric Lansing (Rick Hearst). Both Grahn and Hearst were excited about the pairing, as Grahn told TV Guide, "They're a match. When Alexis gives, Ric can give it right back."

== Storylines ==
=== Background ===
Alexis is the daughter of Mikkos Cassadine, a Greco-Russian prince, and his mistress Kristin Bergman, a Swedish opera singer. Mikkos' wife Helena Cassadine slit Kristin's throat in front of young Alexis, who then developed partial amnesia and forgot her true identity. Alexis was taken into Mikkos' house to be raised as a poor relative with the last name Davidovitch, while her infant sister Kristina disappeared. Alexis' half-brother Stavros Cassadine tormented her, but her other half-brother Stefan Cassadine (who believed at the time Alexis was his cousin) protected her, gaining her loyalty. While attending Briarton Griggs Academy, a boarding school in New Hampshire, Alexis at 16 sees an opportunity to reinvent herself. She dresses up, sneaks out of boarding school and goes to a bar, where she meets Julian Jerome. The two have a one-night stand and she became pregnant. Her father, Mikkos Cassadine took the baby, and gave her up for adoption. Alexis graduated from Yale University as an undergraduate and earned a J.D. from Yale Law School.

=== 1996–2005 ===
In 1996, Stefan, who has instructed Alexis to change her last name to Davis, brings her to town for legal aid. Alexis is protective of Stefan, and tries to make him believe his lover Katherine Bell is his half-sister Natasha. Luke Spencer helps Alexis discover that she is actually the real Natasha. Helena uses this to force Alexis to help her gain control of the Cassadine empire. By doing so, Alexis receives her princess birthright, a title she later gives up. In an attempt to avenge her mother's death, she teams up with Luke to kill Helena, and mistakenly pushes Katherine off a parapet instead. Katherine is presumed dead and Stefan is put on trial; Alexis defends him and gets the charges dropped. Meanwhile, Alexis begins dating Ned Ashton. In 1999, in a complicated scheme to help Chloe Morgan save her company, Ned marries Chloe and Alexis marries Jasper Jacks. Chloe eventually loses her company, and the couples divorce. Ned then proposes to Alexis, but she developed cold feet and leaves Ned at the altar. In 2000, Alexis teams up with mob boss Sonny Corinthos to defend troubled teen Zander Smith, which leads to Alexis reluctantly becoming the full-time lawyer for Sonny and his enforcer Jason Morgan. Meanwhile, in 2001, Jax helps Alexis find her presumed dead sister Kristina Carter. By 2002, Alexis and Sonny have continued to bond, which leads to a one-night stand witnessed by Carly Corinthos, Sonny's estranged wife at the time. Alexis learns she is pregnant, but does not tell Sonny due to his dangerous lifestyle. Ned, who is dating her sister Kristina, agrees to claim to be the father. Kristina dies in a warehouse explosion meant for Sonny and set up by Luis Alcazar. At Kristina's memorial service, Alexis berates Sonny, blaming him for her death. Alexis gives birth to a girl she names Kristina after her sister.

Alexis impersonates butler Dobson in order to spend more time with her daughter.

Alexis confronts Luis Alcazar about her sister's death, to which Alcazar threatens Alexis and she accidentally pushes him to his death. In 2003, she fakes dissociative identity disorder to avoid jail time, while Ned is given custody of Kristina and brings her to live with the Quartermaine family. Alexis disguises herself as a man named Dobson and begins working at the Quartermaine mansion to be closer to her daughter. With the help of psychiatrist Cameron Lewis, Alexis eventually regains full custody of Kristina.

When Kristina is diagnosed with aplastic anemia and needs bone marrow, Alexis is forced to tell Sonny the truth. Kristina's only hope is from stem cells from the unborn child of Sonny and his former lover Sam McCall. Alexis desperately attempts to convince Sam to induce labor two weeks early. However, Sam collapses while they're arguing, and her baby is stillborn. Kristina gets the stem cells she needs, and recovers. Alexis gets involved with Sonny's half-brother, Ric Lansing. The two marry and get pregnant. Alexis comes close to death giving birth to Molly during a train wreck caused by Manny Ruiz, a dangerous criminal. Alexis becomes the court-appointed defense lawyer for Manny, and gets him acquitted despite everyone's warnings about him going free.

=== 2006–11 ===
During the encephalitis epidemic, Alexis receives the last antidote over Sam's brother Danny McCall. Danny dies, which increases Sam's animosity towards Alexis. When she recovers, Alexis decides to find the daughter that she was forced to give up for adoption as a teenager. She is led to believe the girl died, but Jason tells Alexis that her daughter is none other than Sam. When Sam is nearly killed by Manny, Alexis pressures Jason to break up with Sam for her safety. Furious with Alexis' meddling and Jason's choice, Sam gets drunk and sleeps with Ric. Alexis and Jason both witness this. Before she can confront them, Alexis is diagnosed with second-stage lung cancer, and has to undergo chemotherapy. She recovers, and files for divorce from Ric. Knowing Alexis used medical marijuana to counter her chemotherapy, Ric gets full custody of Molly. However, when his father, Zacchara mob lawyer Trevor Lansing, threatens to take Molly away, Ric gives Molly back to Alexis. Sam and Alexis also repair their relationship, and start to bond. Alexis becomes the District Attorney and befriends Sonny's new attorney Diane Miller.

When Alexis charges Mayor Floyd with the murder of his mistress, he reveals that they slept together years before when Alexis had cancer. Alexis has to deal with the resulting fallout from the scandal, as well as a teenage Kristina, rebellious and headstrong. Though Sam tells Alexis her concerns about Kristina, Alexis blames Sonny's son, Michael, for Kristina's troubles. She is faced with the reality of Kristina's situation when Alexis' car is proven to have run Claudia Zacchara off the road, leading to the death of her unborn child. Alexis realizes Kristina was responsible, and confesses to protect her daughter. She's also accused of murdering the mayor's mistress. With the help of her nephew, Nikolas Cassadine, and Diane, Alexis gets a light sentence, though she's forced to resign as the District Attorney. Kristina's problems do not end there, though, and she is hospitalized after being beaten up by her boyfriend, Kiefer Bauer. While driving Kristina to the hospital, Alexis ends up running over Kiefer, killing him. She is not prosecuted, infuriating Kiefer's father, Warren. He continually tries to get Alexis prosecuted, and when his attempts fail, he becomes deranged and opens fire inside General Hospital. He tries to kill Kristina, but he is shot and killed by Mac Scorpio before he can. Kristina and Molly try to set up Alexis with Mac, and though they go on a few dates, Alexis decides she's not interested in Mac.

In order to keep Kristina from dating the older Ethan Lovett, Alexis has Sonny pull strings so Kristina can get into Yale. Kristina is accepted, and leaves for college. Alexis begrudgingly lets Molly, now in high school, date T.J. Ashford. Alexis starts dating Shawn Butler, T.J.'s guardian. She becomes an attorney in Diane's firm, and is involved in various cases during this time, including the custody battle of Josslyn Jacks, and Maxie Jones' trial for the murder of Lisa Niles.

=== 2012– ===
Alexis is hospitalized after being lured into a trap by Jerry Jacks, her old flame. He later reveals that he was actually inoculating her against a pathogen that he put in the Port Charles water supply, infecting the whole town. He demands a large sum of money in exchange for the antidote. Jerry kidnaps her, hoping to disappear with Alexis and the money. However, Shawn rescues Alexis, and the antidote is recovered, saving the town. Alexis becomes a grandmother when Sam has a son with Jason, Danny Morgan. When Danny is diagnosed with leukemia and needs a bone marrow transplant, Sam asks Alexis about her biological father when no one proves to be a match. Alexis reveals that Sam's father was a man she met for only one night, and never saw again. Wanting to help Sam and Danny, Alexis undergoes hypnosis and finds out Sam's father's name is Julian. Sam and Alexis find a donor match for Danny from Derek Wells. Alexis becomes attracted to Derek, though she tries to downplay it. When Alexis hears Shawn mention Julian Jerome, a mobster presumed dead, she suspects that Julian might be Sam's father. She and Sam eventually get proof that Julian is Sam's biological father. Alexis eventually finds out that "Derek" is actually Julian, and he's looking to rebuild his mob empire. In his bid to get Sonny's territory, Julian ends up hiding behind Danny, refusing to bank his bone marrow so that Sonny won't kill him. Both Alexis and Sam are disgusted, and push Julian away. However, Julian tells Alexis that he's also attracted to her, and he'll try to win her over.

In an attempt to avoid Julian's romantic gestures, Alexis dates Ned. Julian, though, becomes even more determined to win Alexis over. When Julian leaves the mob to protect his family, Alexis decides to give him a chance, and they start dating. Julian proposes to her, and the two get married. However, Julian's past comes back to haunt him when his hit man, Carlos Rivera, is arrested for killing Duke Lavery. Alexis represents Carlos, to protect Julian from being implicated. Carlos and a witness who saw Duke's murder turn up dead, and Alexis realizes Julian is responsible for both murders. She tries to turn Julian in, but he hides the evidence that proves he killed Carlos. Alexis files for divorce, furious with Julian and his broken promises. Alexis is arrested for Carlos' murder, and Julian refuses to come forward to protect her. To exonerate herself, Alexis wears a wire and gets Julian to confess to the murders. However, he finds the wire, and tries to kill Alexis. Sonny saves Alexis, and Julian is arrested.

While Julian is awaiting trial, Alexis' law license is suspended for a year because of her breach of ethics for defending Carlos. This, combined with Julian getting acquitted of the murder charges, pushes Alexis over the edge, and she turns to alcohol. Her drinking nearly kills Danny, and alienates her family. The only one who realizes Alexis' drinking problem is Julian, who is still in love with her. During Thanksgiving, Alexis bails on her family to go drinking, and Julian catches her. Alexis tries to escape, but Julian chases after her, and she ends up running him over. Panicked, Alexis runs away. Julian survives, but blackmails Alexis into taking care of him at her house until he recovers. Alexis' drinking gets worse, and she realizes that she may have killed Tom Baker while drunk. This revelation eventually gets Alexis to sober up, and she goes to AA, eventually reconciling with her family. She is cleared of Tom's murder when they find the real killer.

Alexis finds out that her AA sponsor, "Liv Lowry," is actually Olivia St. John, Julian's older sister who was presumed dead is alive and identifies her as Morgan's killer and as Robin's abductor with the help of Curtis, Jason, Sam, and Jordan. Alexis confronts Julian for letting Olivia get close to her, and writes him off. Olivia kidnaps Alexis soon after, and tries to get Julian to kill Alexis as payback for Julian killing Duke, whom Olivia was in love with. Instead, Julian helps Alexis escape. When he tries to fight Olivia, Julian disappears and is presumed dead. Alexis later finds a letter Julian left, saying Olivia threatened to kill his family for months if he didn't kill Alexis, and he was forced to do her bidding. Olivia was later arrested after Sonny and Carly found her at the cemetery. After Olivia was arrested, her defense attorney was Nora Buchanan from Llanview who was also her long lost half-brother Valentin's family attorney. One week after Olivia was sent to a mental asylum, the incident at the Floating Rib took place there involving revenge for Olivia Jerome.

== Reception ==
In 2001, California Lawyer magazine called Alexis "the best lawyer portrayed on network television today." Grahn received Daytime Emmy Award nominations for Outstanding Supporting Actress in a Drama Series in 2000, 2011 and 2012; and for Outstanding Lead Actress in a Drama Series in 2003, 2004, 2005, and 2017. In 2012, she won the Daytime Emmy Award for Outstanding Supporting Actress.

In 2023, Charlie Mason from Soaps She Knows placed Alexis 13th on his ranked list of General Hospital's 40+ Greatest Characters of All Time, commenting that "Bundles of neuroses don't come any more compelling than this alcoholic ex-attorney, the brilliant matriarch of the Davis girls and the most engaging disaster you're ever likely to watch — preferably from a safe distance."
