= Nancy Lee Grahn =

American actress

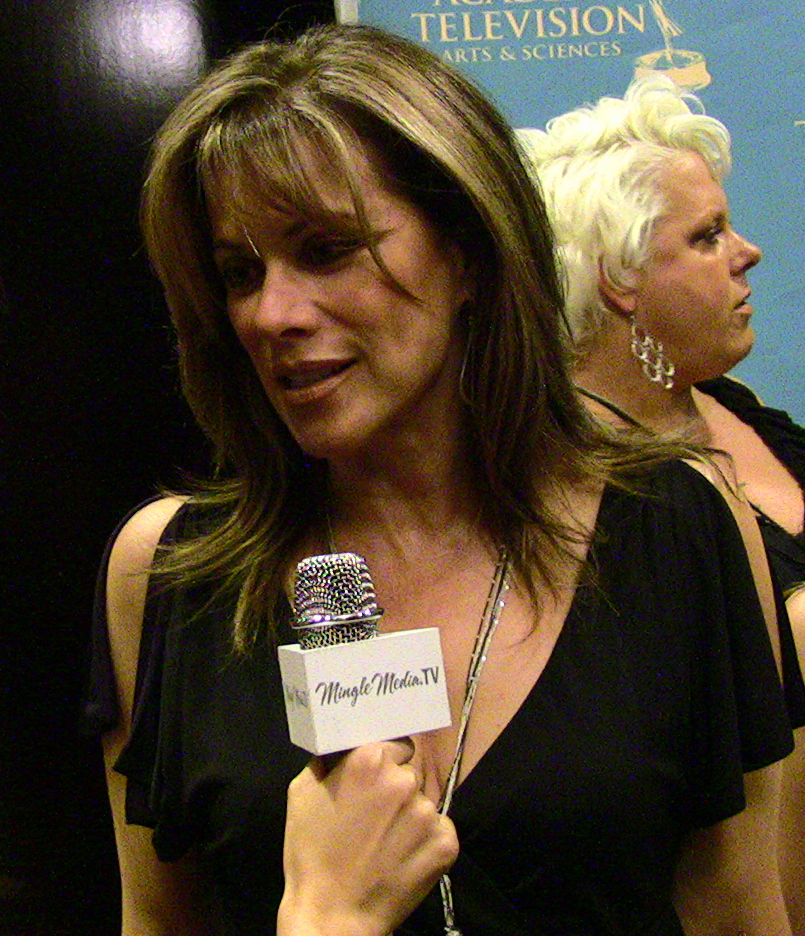
- Born: April 28, 1956 (age 70); Evanston, Illinois, U.S.
- Other name: Nancy Grahn
- Occupation: Actress
- Years active: 1973–present
- Known for: Santa Barbara; General Hospital
- Partner: Richard Smith (engaged)
- Children: 1
- Awards: Full list

Nancy Lee Grahn (born April 28, 1956) is an American actress known primarily for her work in daytime soap operas, portraying Beverly Wilkes on One Life to Live from 1978 to 1982, Julia Wainwright Capwell on Santa Barbara from 1985 to 1993 and Alexis Davis on General Hospital since 1996.

== Early life and career ==
Grahn was born in Evanston, Illinois, to a Jewish mother, Barbara Edna Ascher, and a Lutheran father, Robert Donald Grahn. Her parents were both involved with their local community theater in Skokie. Grahn's first stage appearance was as a pony in a community production of Oklahoma! At Niles North High School, she played "Daisy Mae" opposite future Broadway actor Gregg Edelman in the school's production of Lil' Abner. As a freshman at the University of Illinois at Urbana-Champaign, Grahn landed her first credited role, as Mimi in Guys and Dolls at the Goodman Rep Theater, 1973–74 season.

Grahn subsequently went to New York City, where she studied acting with noted drama teachers Sandy Meisner and Bill Epsen. Here she had roles in productions of A Midsummer Night's Dream and Barefoot in the Park. She also appeared in commercials and several industrial films; in an interview, Grahn recalled crossing paths with fellow future soap star Kim Zimmer at the production of several of those films. She also continued to perform in numerous plays, such as Father's Day and Two for the Seesaw, among others.

== Television roles ==
Grahn has made a number of appearances in episodic prime time television, including Little House on the Prairie, Murder, She Wrote, Magnum, P.I., Diagnosis: Murder, Perry Mason, The Incredible Hulk, Knight Rider and Babylon 5. She has also been seen in the recurring role of Denise Fielding on Melrose Place, as Connie Dahlgren on Murder One, and as Principal Russell on 7th Heaven.

Grahn also has had several roles on daytime dramas. Her first television role was as Beverly Wilkes, Marco Dane's secretary on ABC's One Life to Live from 1978 to 1982. In 1985, she was cast as headstrong lawyer Julia Wainwright Capwell, on the now-defunct soap opera Santa Barbara. Julia was a departure from the traditional "damsel in distress" or vixen roles; she was an intelligent, uncompromising woman. Julia was paired with Mason Capwell, and the two had a Tracy/Hepburn-esque romance. Offscreen, Grahn was briefly involved with Mason's portrayer, actor Lane Davies; conflict over their storylines eventually led to Davies' departure from the series. Grahn's performance garnered her a Daytime Emmy Award for Best Supporting Actress in 1989, an award which she shares with All My Children actress Debbi Morgan. She portrayed the role of Julia until the show's cancellation in 1993.

In 1996, she was cast as Alexis Davis, another headstrong lawyer, on General Hospital. She was nominated for several additional Daytime Emmys, winning in the Outstanding Supporting Actress category in 2012. In July 2010, Grahn re-signed with General Hospital for another four years on the show.

== Political views ==
A liberal, Grahn is outspoken in political matters. In 2000, she organized a television conference for fellow Democratic daytime stars titled "Daytime for Gore/Lieberman". The event was held at the home of Gary Tomlin, director of NBC's Passions, and in attendance were Sharon Davis, wife of then-California Governor Gray Davis, and Kristin Gore, daughter of then-Vice President Al Gore. During the 2008 presidential election, she hosted an online chat along with fellow daytime actors to discuss the election with fans.

Grahn is an active proponent of reproductive rights. She created "Daytime for Choice" in 1988, and discussed with the New York Times in 2007 her decision to have an abortion when she was in her 20s as well as her desire to see abortion depicted in a fair and unbiased light within film and television. Grahn is also a supporter of LGBT rights and has participated in the NOH8 Campaign.

== Personal life ==
Grahn is a single mother to one daughter, Katherine Grace, known as Kate, born on February 24, 1998, who studies music at the University of Southern California (USC). Grahn has two sisters, Wendy Grahn and Suzi Gantz of Illinois. She is also involved in various charities, including Meals on Wheels.

== Filmography ==
Film
Year	Title	Role	Notes
1985	Obsessed with a Married Woman	Bianca	
1985	Kids Don't Tell	Puppet Lady	
1985	Streets of Justice	Young Lawyer	
1990	The Girl Who Came Between Them	Jann	
1991	Perry Mason: The Case of the Glass Coffin	Kate Ford/Greta Eiseman	Television film
1995	Children of the Corn III: Urban Harvest	Amanda Porter	

Television
Year	Title	Role	Notes
1978–82	One Life to Live	Beverly Wilkes	200 episodes
1980	Little House on the Prairie	Saloon Girl	Episode: "He Loves Me, He Loves Me Not: Part 2"
1982	The Incredible Hulk	Patty Knowlton	Episode: "A Minor Problem"
1982	Magnum, P.I.	Wendy Gilbert	Episode: "Try to Remember"
1982	Quincy, M.E.	Melanie Dumont	Episode: "For Love of Joshua"
1982	The Phoenix	Holly	Episode: "A Presence of Evil"
1982	Simon & Simon	Joan	Episode: "Mike & Pat"
1982	Knight Rider	Jane Adams	Episode: "Just My Bill"
1985–86	Murder, She Wrote	Erin Carey/Sheila Dixon	2 episodes
1986	Blacke's Magic	Major Madeline Crawford	Episode: "Address Unknown"
1985–93	Santa Barbara	Julia Wainwright Capwell	722 episodes
1991	Perry Mason: The Case of the Glass Coffin	Kate Ford/Greta Eiseman	TV movie
1995	Models Inc.	Det. Towers	3 episodes
1995	Renegade	Liza	Episode: "Studs"
1995–96	Murder One	Connie Dahlgren	7 episodes
1996	Diagnosis: Murder	Terri Michaels	Episode: "Left-Handed Murder"
1996–	General Hospital	Alexis Davis	1040 episodes
1997	Melrose Place	Denise Fielding	7 episodes
1997–99	7th Heaven	Principal Russell	6 episodes
2000	Port Charles	Alexis Davis	7 episodes
2013	Castle	Samantha Peterman	Episode: "Significant Others"

== Awards and nominations ==
List of acting awards and nominations for Nancy Lee Grahn
Year	Award	Category	Title	Result	Ref.
1989	Daytime Emmy Award	Outstanding Supporting Actress in a Drama Series	Santa Barbara	Won	
1991	Soap Opera Digest Award	Outstanding Super Couple: Daytime (shared with Gordon Thomson)	Santa Barbara	Nominated	
1993	Soap Opera Digest Award	Hottest Female Star	Santa Barbara	Nominated	
1993	Soap Opera Digest Award	Outstanding Lead Actress	Santa Barbara	Nominated	
2000	Daytime Emmy Award	Outstanding Supporting Actress in a Drama Series	General Hospital	Nominated	
2000	Soap Opera Digest Award	Outstanding Supporting Actress	General Hospital	Won	
2001	Soap Opera Digest Award	Outstanding Supporting Actress	General Hospital	Won	
2003	Daytime Emmy Award	Outstanding Lead Actress in a Drama Series	General Hospital	Nominated	
2003	Soap Opera Digest Award	Outstanding Supporting Actress	General Hospital	Won	
2004	Daytime Emmy Award	Outstanding Lead Actress in a Drama Series	General Hospital	Nominated	
2005	Daytime Emmy Award	Outstanding Lead Actress in a Drama Series	General Hospital	Nominated	
2005	Soap Opera Digest Award	Favorite New Couple (shared with Rick Hearst)	General Hospital	Nominated	
2006	Daytime Emmy Award	Outstanding Special Class Special (Co-Host)	SOAPnet Reveals; ABC Soap Secrets	Nominated	
2011	Daytime Emmy Award	Outstanding Supporting Actress in a Drama Series	General Hospital	Nominated	
2012	Daytime Emmy Award	Outstanding Supporting Actress in a Drama Series	General Hospital	Won	
2017	Daytime Emmy Award	Outstanding Lead Actress in a Drama Series	General Hospital	Nominated	
2018	Daytime Emmy Award	Outstanding Lead Actress in a Drama Series	General Hospital	Nominated	
2021	Daytime Emmy Award	Outstanding Lead Actress in a Drama Series	General Hospital	Nominated	
2022	Daytime Emmy Award	Outstanding Supporting Actress in a Drama Series	General Hospital	Nominated	
2025	Daytime Emmy Award	Outstanding Lead Actress in a Drama Series	General Hospital	Won	

== See also ==
- List of University of Illinois at Urbana-Champaign people
