= Lisa LoCicero =

American actress

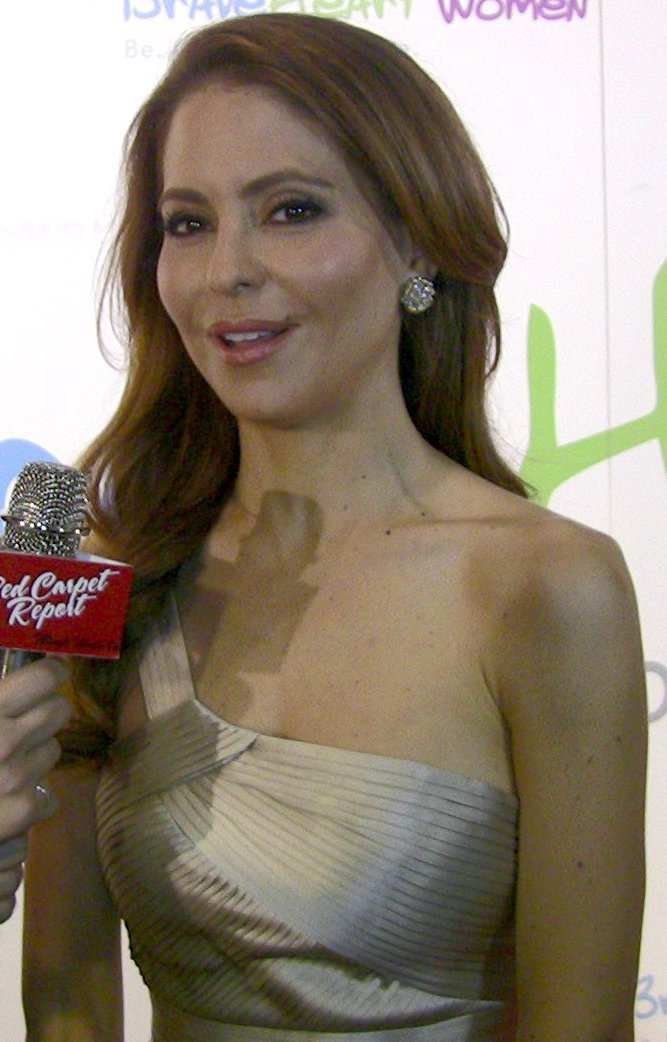
- Lisa LoCicero in 2011
- Born: April 18, 1970 (age 56); Grosse Pointe, Michigan, U.S.
- Occupation: Actress
- Years active: 1994–present
- Spouse: Michael Patrick Jann (m. 2000)
- Children: 2

Lisa LoCicero (born April 18, 1970) is an American actress. She is known for her role as Sonia Toledo in ABC soap opera One Life to Live, and Olivia Falconeri in another ABC soap opera, General Hospital.

== Career ==
Her first notable role was Jocelyn Roberts Brown on the ABC daytime soap opera Loving in 1995. LoCicero stayed with the series when it was spun off as The City, and remained until its cancellation in 1997. She next appeared in small roles in the films The Family Man (2000) and Rush Hour 2 (2001). LoCicero played Miral Paris in the 2001 series finale of Star Trek: Voyager, as well as the recurring role of Nina Shaw on the sitcom Raising Dad in 2002. Her role in the 2004's After the Sunset was cut from the final version of the film.

LoCicero appeared as reporter Maria Storm on the comedy series Reno 911! in September 2004. Around this time she auditioned for the character Lois Cerullo on General Hospital, and was offered the recurring role of Kathryn Fitzgerald on One Life to Live. With her family in Los Angeles and One Life to Live taped in New York City, LoCicero declined. When One Life to Live executive producer Frank Valentini later offered LoCicero the contract role of Sonia Toledo, she accepted it. However, after head writer Michael Malone was replaced by Dena Higley in late 2004, LoCicero and fellow cast member Javier Morga (Tico Santi) were written off the series. 2006 films Invasión robótica In 2008, LoCicero appeared on It's Always Sunny in Philadelphia. She next began portraying the role of Olivia Falconeri on General Hospital in September 2008. In 2011, she appeared on Rizzoli & Isles as a murder suspect.

== Personal life ==
LoCicero was born in Grosse Pointe, Michigan on April 18, 1970, and she is a graduate of the American Academy of Dramatic Arts.

In 2001, LoCicero and her husband Michael Patrick Jann, had a son, Lukas.

On June 2, 2015, LoCicero announced on her official Twitter account that she gave birth to a daughter, Verity Marion, on May 30.

== Filmography ==
Year	Film	Role	Notes
2015	Skeletons	Michelle Morgan	Short Film Post-Production
2015	Unto Others	TBA	Post-Production
2014	Star Trek Online	Miral Paris (voice)	
2012	Soap Life	Herself	
2011	Rizzoli & Isles	Yvonne Smith	
2011	Chuck	Daphne Peralta	Episode: "Chuck Versus the Wedding Planner" (April 18, 2011)
2010	Bones	Janine Genaro	Episode: "The Maggots in the Meathead" (October 7, 2010)
2008–present	General Hospital	Olivia Falconeri	Series regular; role since: September 19, 2008–present Nominated-2015 Daytime Emmy, Supporting Actress, Drama Series
2008	Little Britain USA	unknown	Episode: "Episode #1.6" (November 2, 2008)
2008	It's Always Sunny in Philadelphia	Philadelphia Soul Executive	Episode: "Dennis Reynolds: An Erotic Life" (October 23, 2008)
2008	InAlienable	Dr. Maagee	
2007	Wainy Days	Villainess	Episode: "Wainy Nights" (November 26, 2007)
2007	Without a Trace	Linda Rosen	Episode: "Eating Away" (January 14, 2007)
2007	American Family	Mary Foster	TV
2007	Marlowe	Stephanie Church	TV
2006	A.I. Assault	Susan Foster	TV (Released: September 4, 2006)
2005	Joey	Celeste	Episode: "Joey and the Sex Tape" (November 10, 2005)
2005	Gettin' Lucky	Donna	
2004–2007	Reno 911!	Maria Storm	12 episodes
2004	Good Girls Don't	Marissa Moreno	Episode: "Oh, Brother" (July 25, 2004)
2003	Lap Dancing	Ginger	
2003	Star Trek: Elite Force II	Various (voice)	VG (Released: June 30, 2003)
2003	Love and Loathing at the Ass Lamp Lounge	Jane Hamilton	
2002	Raising Dad	Nina Shaw	Episode: "Losing It" (May 10, 2002); Episode: "First Date" (January 18, 2002) as Lisa Locicero
2002	Star Trek: Bridge Commander	Ensign Kiska LoMar (voice)	VG (Released: March 2002)
2001	Star Trek: Armada II	Additional Voices (voice)	VG (Released: December 7, 2001)
2001	Rush Hour 2	Receptionist	Released: August 1, 2001
2001	Star Trek: Voyager	Ensign Miral Paris	Episode: "Endgame" (May 23, 2001)
2001	Doing Unto Others	Kate	
2000	The Family Man	Executive #2	Released: December 22, 2000
1999, 2004	One Life to Live	Sonia Toledo	1999: 7 episodes 2004: 44 episodes
1999	V.I.P.	Doris Blasker	Episode: "Val Goes to Town" (November 13, 1999)
1999	Rude Awakening	Polly	Episode: "Bite Me" (August 21, 1999)
1999	Sons of Thunder		Episode:"Thunder by Your Side" (April 17, 1999)
1999	Foreign Correspondents	Christina	Released: September 17, 2001
1999	Viper	Candace Lindo	Episode: "Best Seller" (January 4, 1999)
1998	LateLine	Miss Palestine	Episode: "Gale Gets a Life" (March 31, 1998)
1998	NYPD Blue	Viveca Cerdan	Episode: "Twin Petes" (February 10, 1998)
1997	Law & Order	Janeane Darnell	Episode: "Mad Dog" (April 4, 1997)
1997	Mr. Vincent	Lisa	
1995	Loving	Jocelyn Roberts Brown	Episodes: June 8 – November 10, 1995
1995	The City	Jocely Roberts Brown	Episodes: unknown
1994	Murder Too Sweet	Dara	
2023	Organ Trail	Ma	

== Video games ==
Year	Game	Character	Role	Ref.
2002	Star Trek: Bridge Commander	Ensign Kiska LoMar		
2003	Star Trek: Elite Force II	Various		
2010, 2026	Star Trek Online	Miral Paris	Voice role	

== Awards and nominations ==
List of acting awards and nominations
Year	Award	Category	Title	Result	Ref.
2015	Daytime Emmy Award	Outstanding Supporting Actress in a Drama Series	General Hospital	Nominated	
2020	Soap Hub Awards	Favorite General Hospital Actress	General Hospital	Nominated	
2021	Soap Hub Awards	Favorite General Hospital Actress	General Hospital	Nominated	
