= Julian Jerome =

Fictional character from General Hospital

- General Hospital character
- William deVry as Julian Jerome
- Portrayed by: Jason Culp (1988–1990); William deVry (2013–2020)
- Duration: 1988–1990; 2013–2020
- First appearance: February 24, 1988
- Last appearance: December 21, 2020
- Created by: Ann Marcus and Norma Monty
- Introduced by: H. Wesley Kenney (1988); Frank Valentini (2013)
- Jason Culp as Julian Jerome
In-universe information
- Other names: Derek Wells; Charlie (nickname)
- Occupation: Mob boss; Owner of Crimson magazine (2013–2016); Owner of Barrett Enterprises; Co-owner of Extreme Motors; Owner of Charlie's Pub (2017–2020)
- Family: Jerome
- Father: Victor Jerome
- Brothers: Evan Jerome
- Sisters: Olivia St. John
- Half-brothers: Dino Antoinelli
- Half-sisters: Ava Jerome
- Spouse: Alexis Davis (2016); Nelle Benson (2020)
- Children: Sam McCall; Lucas Jones; Leo Falconeri; Andrew Nero
- Stepchildren: Wiley Cooper-Jones
- Grandsons: Danny Morgan
- Granddaughters: Lila McCall; Emily Cain
- Nephews: Evan Jerome, Jr.
- Nieces: Kiki Jerome; Avery Corinthos

Julian Jerome is a fictional character from the original ABC Daytime drama General Hospital. Created by Ann Marcus and Norma Monty, the role was originally portrayed by Jason Culp from 1988 to 1990. William deVry took over the role upon the character's re-introduction in 2013 before exiting in 2020.

== Creation ==
=== Background ===
Julian Jerome is the youngest son of crime lord Victor Jerome (Jack Axelrod), born in 1959. Unlike his older brothers, Victor favors Julian and protects him from the mob life. While in graduate school, Julian has a three-year romance with Cheryl Stansbury (Jennifer Anglin) and they fall in love. According to his sister, Olivia (Tonja Walker), Julian even plans to marry Cheryl. However, Julian is forced to break off the relationship as Victor refuses to involve Cheryl in the family business.

=== Casting ===
The role was originated by Jason Culp on February 24, 1988. Culp made his final appearance on March 16, 1990.

On July 8, 2013, TV Source Magazine announced exclusively that William deVry—previously recognized for his role as Storm Logan on The Bold and the Beautiful and his Daytime Emmy Award-nominated role as Michael Cambias on All My Children—had joined the cast of General Hospital in an undisclosed contract role. deVry filmed his first scenes on July 9—reportedly with Maura West—who had recently joined the cast as Ava Jerome. deVry later took to Facebook to announce the news and revealed his first air date to be July 30. deVry also appeared briefly on the General Hospital spin-off, Port Charles. deVry said when he originally auditioned for the role, he wanted to make sure the series was not using the open casting call in an attempt to cast someone else. No decision had been made and they were still testing candidates for the role. Three weeks after his first audition, deVry had a screen test. The character and casting was very much a mystery. deVry revealed that he and the others who auditioned for role were only given a vague character breakdown. However, the lack of information provided for the character only piqued his interest. deVry also revealed that he was hesitant to take the role due to his history with All My Children and the sudden change in direction for the character of Michael Cambias with the installation of new producers. He was offered a screen test immediately after his audition; he screen tested with Maurice Benard, who portrays Sonny Corinthos. A few days later, deVry booked the role, was offered a four-year deal with the serial, and filmed his first official scenes with Sullivan; in addition to Sullivan, deVry verified reports he had indeed worked with West.

On August 6, 2017, Soap Opera Digest reported that deVry had been off the serial since June of the same year, due to negotiations between himself and the soap; deVry revealed: "I’m hoping that we can get a deal done before too much time passes." Six days later, executive producer Frank Valentini announced a deal had been reached with deVry, ensuring his return to the role. He returned during the November 6 episode.

In November 2020, following increased speculation, deVry announced his exit from the role. He last acted in the role on December 18, and made his final appearance on December 21.

== Development ==
TV Source confirmed the character's name as Derek Wells, the boss of fashion editor Connie Falconeri, portrayed by the departing Kelly Sullivan. Derek comes to town with an "agenda", said deVry. However, deVry claimed that he had not filmed with West. deVry described Derek as a "really strong character." Soaps In Depth speculated that deVry's Derek would factor into many more storyline. deVry later confirmed those speculations. Soaps In Depth described Derek as a "media mogul" who would cause trouble for several other characters, including Sullivan's Connie and by extension Benard's Sonny. Derek is introduced as the new owner of Connie's fashion magazine, Crimson, and its parent publication, the tabloid recently abandoned by Todd Manning (Roger Howarth). deVry said that anyone who comes in contact with Derek should watch their backs. Soaps In Depth speculated that Derek would factor into Connie's departure from the canvas. Michael Fairman speculated that Derek Wells was just a code name and that Derek Wells was somehow connected to the infamous Jerome crime family. Ron Carlivati previewed the month of August and hinted that Derek Wells shared a connection to Ava and the original Jerome family. According to Carlivati, deVry's introduction opens the door for a new and bigger story. deVry admitted that the decision to make his character Julian Jerome was very last minute and he was only made aware of the potential decision a few days before taped his first scenes. Upon's deVry's introduction as Julian, it is revealed that he and sister Ava were behind the gambling ring that afforded them the opportunity to infiltrate the Corinthos crime organization.

== Storylines ==
=== 1988–1990 ===
Julian agrees to help Duke Lavery (Ian Buchanan) find his kidnapped wife, Anna (Finola Hughes), much to his father's chagrin. However, Julian is thinking of the bigger picture and tries to convince Victor to use Duke to legitimize their criminal organization. Julian's attempt to help Duke ends in tragedy when he is shot and wounded in a shootout with a rival mob boss in March 1988. On his death bed, Julian makes Duke promise to help Victor legitimize the mob. Julian's death bed guilt trip put a kink in Duke's plans to cut ties from the mob completely which Julian had previously warned Duke against. At Julian's memorial service, Olivia announces that she and Duke will be controlling the organization. Meanwhile, Julian's former love Cheryl resurfaces and does her best to hide her relationship with Julian from her current boyfriend, police commissioner, Robert Scorpio (Tristan Rogers). Unbeknownst to most, Olivia had put a hit out on her brother, hoping to take over their father's business. Cheryl discovers that Julian is actually alive. He convinces her to keep quiet. However, Julian blows his own cover to confront his sister about her involvement in his shooting. Olivia claims the bullet was meant for Duke.

When Julian refuses to go along with Olivia's plans to merge the Jerome and Carter families, Olivia has her henchman, Dino (Chris DeRose), kidnap Cheryl. When a hysterical Cheryl shoots at Olivia and leaves her in a coma, Julian covers it up, framing Anna. Julian still protects Cheryl when he is implicated in Olivia's attempted murder after her earring, which he gave to her as a gift, is discovered at the crime scene. However, Olivia, who hated Anna, helps keep up the story and claims Anna as the shooter. Duke threatens Julian when it is revealed that he, Olivia and Robert have been covering for Cheryl and framing Anna. Julian helps care for Cheryl when she gets shot, which immediately causes trouble for Cheryl and Robert. Anna and Cheryl are cleared when it is revealed that Dino, Victor's illegitimate son, had shot Olivia, hoping to claim the Jerome empire for himself.

When Duke and Anna successfully send Olivia to a mental hospital and Victor ends up dead, Julian swears revenge for Duke's betrayal. With the family weakened by Victor's death, Julian heads up the organization, and makes it his business to neutralize Olivia, who has escaped from the mental hospital. He puts a hit out on Duke, who has gotten plastic surgery and is going by the name Jonathan Paget (Greg Beecroft), and plans to frame Olivia for the crime. However, Julian ends up killing Olivia when he learns that she told Anna about Paget's true identity. In March 1990, the bitter rivalry comes to an end when Julian and Duke are both killed after a struggle over a gun. It is later revealed that Cheryl gave birth to Julian's son, and Victor arranged for Cheryl to think the child was stillborn. The child, Lucas is eventually adopted by Dr. Tony Jones (Brad Maule) and his wife, Bobbie (Jacklyn Zeman), after Cheryl's death in 1992.

=== 2013–2015 ===
Media mogul Derek Wells arrives as the new owner of Crimson magazine and The Port Charles Press. "Derek" is later revealed to be Julian, working with sister Ava (Maura West) to reclaim the Port Charles mob territory from Sonny Corinthos (Maurice Benard), the current mob boss. Sam Morgan (Kelly Monaco) requests Derek's help to find a bone marrow for her ailing son, Danny, but when he bumps the story, he agrees to get tested to make up for it. When Derek proves to be a match, and learns how Sam was conceived from her mother, Alexis Davis (Nancy Lee Grahn), he realizes he is Sam's father. Though Ava tells him to keep quiet, he's torn over wanting a family. Sonny discovers that Julian had survived the shooting and that the WSB and then Police Commissioner Robert Scorpio had arranged for him to receive a new face and identity in exchange for his testimony against the mob. Sonny exposes Julian's identity, and threatens his life. However, Julian uses Danny as leverage, saying that if he relapses, Julian will need to be alive to donate bone marrow. Sam begs Julian to bank his bone marrow to prove he cares about his family more than the business. Julian refuses, upsetting Sam, who pushes him away. Julian tries to reach out to Sam, as well as Alexis, who he's falling for.

Ava and Julian start to grow distant, especially after Ava starts having an affair with Sonny's son, Morgan (Bryan Craig). She gives information to Sonny on Julian's business to hang onto Morgan, and Sonny finds out that Julian has a silent boss who has been bankrolling him for years. This boss is revealed to be Luke Spencer (Anthony Geary), who shows a ruthless side to handling the business. After Sonny goes to prison, he hands over his business to Duke, who also survived the shootout, to keep Julian from taking over. Julian sends his hitman, Carlos Rivera (Jeffrey Vincent Parise), after Duke, and the botched hit leaves Duke dead. Anna is devastated, and vows to make Julian pay. Julian meets Lucas (Ryan Carnes), now an adult and a doctor, but has trouble connecting with him after Lucas reveals that he's gay. Wanting to connect with his family and Alexis, Julian decides to leave the mob. Luke, though, refuses to let him, and threatens his family to make sure he doesn't leave. Needing help, Julian confesses to a crime, and gets sent to Pentonville, where Sonny is locked up on a murder charge. The two team up to try and stop Luke. They're able to break out with Ava, and thwart Luke. Julian saves Lucas before being caught. Alexis helps get Julian acquitted, and he's released from prison. Alexis starts dating Julian, and he's able to reconnect with his children, as well. Olivia Falconeri (Lisa LoCicero) becomes pregnant with Julian's child after a one-night-stand, but she claims that Ned Ashton (Wally Kurth) is the father. Right before she goes into labor, though, Julian finds out that he's the father. Olivia gives birth to a baby boy, but Julian is led to believe the baby died. Olivia left town, and returned with an infant she claimed to have adopted. Julian later found out that the baby boy with Olivia was actually their son, Leo, and went to confront Olivia. Alexis came, and stopped Julian from starting a fight with Olivia, helping him calm down. He and Olivia sat down to talk, and eventually agreed to a shared custody arrangement.

=== 2016–2020 ===
Julian proposed to Alexis, and they got engaged. During their wedding, the entire congregation was taken hostage by Landon Dixon (Troy Ruptash), who was after Ava for calling the cops on his weapons shipment because Landon is in revenge for the late Helena Cassadine (Constance Towers). Sonny was able to subdue Landon, and he was arrested. Julian found out that Ava was being threatened by their organization after talking to the cops, and tried to find a way to protect her. He ended up re-entering the mob. Soon after, Carlos is arrested for murdering Duke, and tells Julian to help him get released. Julian asks Alexis to be Carlos' attorney, despite the fact that it's a conflict of interest. Alexis agrees, but Carlos escapes custody. He asks Julian to help him leave town, but Julian instead stabs Carlos, killing him. Alexis quickly realizes Julian was responsible for the murder, and he tries to cover up the evidence so Alexis can't turn him in. Alexis, though, tells Julian she's done with him, and files for divorce. Julian refuses to grant the divorce, saying he'll fight to regain Alexis' trust. However, Alexis is arrested for Carlos' murder soon after, and tells Julian to come forward so she is not charged with murder. Julian refuses, saying Alexis should go to trial and get acquitted. Alexis instead wears a wire, and gets Julian to confess to both Duke and Carlos' murder. Julian finds the wire, and kidnaps Alexis, bringing her to the pier and nearly killing her. He's stopped by Sonny, and while the two are fighting, Alexis stabs Julian, saving herself and Sonny. Julian is arrested, and his children disown him. However, he is acquitted at the trial, thanks to his lawyer, Scott Baldwin (Kin Shriner) who was having the video of the will reading of Helena Cassadine, and Ava.

Despite getting acquitted, Julian's children and Alexis still turn their backs on him. Soon after, Julian's car is bombed, and ends up killing Morgan, who had stolen it while drunk. Believing Sonny is responsible, Julian hires investigator Curtis Ashford (Donnell Turner) to prove Sonny's guilt. However, when Curtis finds out someone else is responsible, Julian fires him. He later takes a call from "Oscar Jessup," the man Curtis said was linked to the bombing. Julian realized that Alexis had become an alcoholic after losing her law license for defending Carlos. Trying to get her to sober up, Julian tries to get her help, but no one believes him. Julian decides to intervene himself, but ends up severely injured when Alexis runs him over while driving drunk. He blackmails her into taking care of him so he won't tell the police. Alexis eventually sobers up when Julian forces her to, and he decides not to press charges against Alexis. Sam was investigating the bombing along with her husband, Jason Morgan (Billy Miller), and Julian was ordered to kill Jason by Jessup's men. Julian refused, and tried to come clean to Sam, until he found out Leo was hospitalized. He went to confront "Jessup," who was actually his sister, Olivia. She had taken over after Julian left, and coerced him into joining the mob by threatening Julian's family. Olivia is also responsible for killing Morgan. She wanted revenge on Julian for ruining her life, and killing Duke. Julian was desperate to get rid of his sister, and tried to kill Olivia. She caught on and kidnapped a pregnant Sam in retaliation. Julian left a letter for Alexis to find in case something happened to him. Olivia found out, and kidnapped Julian to cover her own tracks. Julian was rescued, and was questioned by the police about his sister's plans. Alexis finds out about Olivia, and yells at Julian for not telling her or anyone else about his sister.

In May 2020, he marries Nelle Benson (Chloe Lanier) after being blackmailed by her due to his role in allowing Brad Cooper (Parry Shen) to raise her child Wiley as his son (Julian's grandson via Lucas). In August, Julian is forced to help Nelle kidnap Wiley, but she dies fleeing from Carly and Wiley is saved. However, serial killer Ryan Chamberlain (Jon Lindstrom) blackmails him with the same information and threatens to turn him over to Sonny, but Julian makes a deal with Cyrus Renault (Jeff Kober) who then has Ryan stabbed and put into a coma. In return, Cyrus orders Julian to kill Jason (Steve Burton as Miller's Jason is his twin Drew Cain) and thus has him carry out the deadly Floating Rib bombing which does not kill Jason though. Due to his role as a domestic terrorist, Ava tries to kill Julian, who jumps off a parapet once Sonny and Jason show up.

Sonny and Jason catch up to Julian in New York City, but Cyrus' hitman shows up and shoots Julian for his failure, causing him to go on the run to New Jersey instead. While waiting for a bus, a wounded Julian is haunted by visions of Duke, Connie, and Alexis for his crimes against them. Sonny and Jason find him again, but once again, Cyrus' hitman shows up and tries to shoot Julian, engaging Jason in a shootout. Julian heads to a nearby bridge and Sonny catches up to him, claiming that Julian can redeem himself if he surrendered. Moments later, Julian seemingly passes out from his wound and as Sonny goes to check on him, Julian attacks him. However, in the struggle, Sonny accidentally shoots Julian, killing him. Jason arrives at the bridge, which collapses to send Sonny and Julian's corpse falling.

== Reception ==
Soap Central noted the irony in deVry's casting being announced on the ten-year anniversary of the actor's performance on All My Children as the evil rapist of Bianca Montgomery. The casting was approved by critics. "Just rename General Hospital, Sex and Port Charles!" said Jamey Giddens. Michael Fairman praised the scenes in which deVry was revealed to be Julian Jerome, along with his first meeting with his daughter, Sam. Laurie Bedigian also praised the storyline and described it as a "great play on history". Bedigian also praised the decision to cast deVry in the role. Soaps In Depth praised the reveal. deVry was ranked as the second-most enjoyable newcomer to GH in a Soap Opera Digest poll, with 44% of votes. deVry ranked at #10 on Daytime Confidential's list of the "10 Best Male Soap Opera Entertainers" for the year and praised the actor for portrayal of concerned father and grandfather, and a ruthless mob boss.

In 2020, Candace Young from Soaps She Knows put Julian on her list of the hottest soap opera villains, saying that the character "is the son of mob boss, Victor Jerome, and lived up to his name with a list of crimes and unsavory acts a mile long. Julian is as sexy as they come, however, with those eyes, that voice…and that hot body. It’s always a good day in Port Charles when Julian has a shirtless, sexy scene."
