= Cassadine family =

Fictional family on General Hospital

- General Hospital family
- (l-r): Stefan Cassadine (Stephen Nichols), Nikolas Cassadine (Tyler Christopher), Alexis Davis (Nancy Lee Grahn), and Helena Cassadine (Constance Towers)
- First appearance: February 13, 1981
- Created by: Pat Falken Smith and Margaret DePriest
- Introduced by: Gloria Monty
- Duration: 1981, 1983–1986, 1996–present

The Cassadines are a fictional aristocratic family from the American soap opera General Hospital. Created by executive producer Gloria Monty, the family was first introduced in February 1981, with the arrival of Tony Cassadine. Brothers Victor and Mikkos were introduced months later. The Cassadines are descendants of Russian royalty and own their own private island in Greece. Various family members have been sometime residents of Port Charles, living in Wyndemere Castle on Spoon Island. The family is known for their longtime feud with the Spencer family. After the family's initial appearance in 1981, they were absent from the series until the arrival of Stavros Cassadine in 1983. The Cassadine family owns and operates the international conglomerate Cassadine Industries. The family is currently represented on canvas by Alexis, Valentin, Nikolas, Kristina, Molly, Danny, Charlotte, Scout, and Ace.

== Background ==
The Cassadines are descendants of the Russian aristocracy, with connections to the royal Romanov family. They existed for hundreds of years in Russia until the Bolshevik Revolution forced them to flee to Greece. After that period, they built a large economic empire of power and wealth. The Cassadines make their first appearance in the 1980s, when Mikkos Cassadine, the patriarch of the family, along with his brothers Victor and Tony, are involved in various nefarious plans, including the Ice Princess storyline, a plot to freeze the world using a weather machine. When Luke Spencer foils their plan, the great feud between the Spencers and Cassadines begins. Elizabeth Taylor originated the role of villain Helena Cassadine, Mikkos' wife, in this era. Her curse on Luke and Laura's wedding was watched by over 30 million viewers.

== Traditions ==
- Cassadine line of succession
  The Cassadine title of "Prince" passes from eldest son to eldest son, and the authority that goes with it both symbolic and real. If a Cassadine Prince were to die without a male heir the title would die with him and the fortune he controlled would be scattered amongst the surviving family members.
- Cassadine Bacchanalia
  A traditional masquerade ball thrown in honor of a Cassadine engagement.

== Family members ==
Characters currently on the show are noted in bold; family members through marriage are in italics. Only current spouses or those married at the time of their death appear here.

=== Distant ancestors ===
- Vladimir Cassadine - The First Cassadine said by Nikolas to be a warrior who founded the Cassadine Empire of Imperial Russia.
- Anya Cassadine
- Prince Nikolai Cassadine
- Nikolas Cassadine (I)

=== Ancestors ===
- Prince Stanislaus Cassadine
  - Katya Cassadine
- Ivan Cassadine - Based on Mikkos's middle name, which is "Ivanovich"—all of the children in the Cassadine family follow the Russian tradition of a patronymic.
- Irina Cassadine - According to Stefan, his grand aunt, making her Mikkos's aunt.
- Eugenia Cassadine

=== First generation ===
- Prince Mikkos Ivanovich Cassadine, Oldest of the Cassadine siblings.
  - Helena Romanov
- Victor Ivanovich Cassadine - Middle brother of the trio.
- Anthony "Tony" Ivanovich Cassadine - Youngest of the brothers.
- Sophia Ivanovna Cassadine-Davidovitch - Sister of Mikkos, Victor and Tony.
  - Alexei Davidovitch
- Petros Cassadine - Cousin of Mikkos, Tony, Sophia, and Victor.
- Dimitri Cassadine - 10th cousin, several times removed of Mikkos.

=== Second generation ===
- Prince Stavros Nikolai Mikkosovich Cassadine - Son of Mikkos and Helena.
- Prince Stefan Darius Mikkosovich Cassadine - Son of Mikkos and Helena.
- **Alexis Davis** (born Princess Natasha Alexandra Mikkosovna Cassadine) - Daughter of Mikkos and Kristin Bergman.
- Princess Kristina Mikkosovna Cassadine - Daughter of Mikkos and Kristin Bergman.
- Valentin Victorovich Cassadine - Son of Helena and Victor
- Irina Cassadine - Daughter of Helena.

=== Third generation ===
- Prince Nikolas Mikhail Stavrosovich Cassadine - Son of Stavros and Laura Collins.
- Samantha "Sam" McCall - Daughter of Alexis and Julian Jerome.
- **Kristina Adela Corinthos-Davis** - Daughter of Alexis and Sonny Corinthos.
- **Molly Lansing-Davis** - Daughter of Alexis and Ric Lansing.
- **Charlotte Cassadine** - Daughter of Valentin and Lulu Spencer.

=== Fourth generation ===
- Prince Spencer Stefan Niklosovich Cassadine - Son of Nikolas and Courtney Matthews.
- Lila McCall - Daughter of Sam and Sonny Corinthos.
- **Daniel Edward "Danny" Morgan** - Son of Sam and Jason Morgan.
- **Emily Scout Quartermaine** - Daughter of Sam and Drew Quartermaine.
- **Prince Ace Niklosovich Prince-Cassadine** - Son of Nikolas and Esme Prince.

=== Other relations ===
- In 1998 Nikolas was led to believe that he was not the Cassadine Prince. During this time Stefan attempted to convince him to try and hold on to control of the Cassadine Estate. Nikolas refused, stating that the Estate didn't belong to him if he was not the Prince, it belonged to "the Belgian Cassadines, and the Baron's children in Macao, and to Helena, Alexis and Cousin Mikhail who took Holy orders -- "

== Cassadine Industries ==
Owned by the Cassadines. Cassadine Industries is a large international conglomerate, which was founded by the Cassadine family in the late 1970s as a front to cover for their dirty dealings. But the business took off, being controlled by Mikkos Cassadine, Stavros Cassadine, Helena Cassadine, Stefan Cassadine and Nikolas Cassadine amongst others. In December 2005, a single Cassandine Industries account was estimated to be worth $15 million at the time. As of May 2009, Cassadine Industries was estimated to be worth over 20 billion dollars. Reportedly in 2015, Helena Cassadine and Victor Cassadine had liquidated most of Cassadine Industries in order to finance their personal "projects". In 2015, Nikolas Cassadine obtained control of ELQ in order to save his family empire. In 2016, following Nikolas Cassadine's death, it was revealed that Valentin Cassadine is the sole heir to the Cassadine empire. In 2020, this was reversed through a secret codicil to Mikkos' will that revealed Valentin is Helena's son and not a Cassadine at all. Thus, Nikolas was reinstated as sole heir. In October 2021, Victor Cassadine was not only revealed to be alive, but also Valentin's father.

On September 15, 2023, at the Invader, Alexis Davis and Spencer Cassadine go over the legal codicil for CI. The Cassadine estate is about to be handed over to him as it's been six months since his father split, but he has no idea how to translate the legal jargon in the document he was sent. Alexis is happy to look over the document, noting it's very complicated, and she'll need time to get back to him. Spencer is grateful to her, and for having family helping him with this.

=== Subsidiaries ===
- Cassadine Drilling Company
- Cassadine Construction
- General Hospital
- Emily Bowen Quartermaine Clinic
- Equinox Corporation

=== Employees ===
- CEO and Sole Shareholder Money is Frozen

== Residence ==
=== Wyndemere Castle (Spoon Island) ===
Current Owners
Jenz Sidwell
Current Residents
Jenz Sidwell
Former Residents
Nikolas Cassadine	Victor Cassadine	Spencer Cassadine	Esme Prince	Curtis Ashford	Hayden Barnes	Katherine Bell	Emily Bowen-Quartermaine	Gia Campbell
Helena Cassadine	Irina Cassadine	Valentin Cassadine	Stavros Cassadine	Stefan Cassadine				
Alexis Davis	Cesar Faison	Rocco Falconeri	Jerry Jacks	Ava Jerome				
Avery Jerome-Corinthos	Lucas Jones	Lydia Karenin	Ewen Keenan	Colleen McHenry				
Caleb Morley	Liesl Obrecht	Brook Lynn Quartermaine	Ned Quartermaine	Nina Reeves				
Robin Scorpio-Drake	Aiden Spencer	Bobbie Spencer	Cameron Spencer	Jake Spencer				
Laura Collins	Valerie Spencer	Elizabeth Webber	Britt Westbourne	Dawn Winthrop				

== Family tree ==
Legend

Lines	Boxes
Dashed = Romance/Marriage; Solid = Child	Character is currently on the Show Character not on the Show Character is deceased or presumed dead

Stanislaus Cassadine	Katya Cassadine
Unnamed Cassadine	Unnamed woman	Ivan Cassadine	Unnamed woman
Petros Cassadine	Sophia Cassadine	Tony Cassadine	Victor Cassadine	Helena Cassadine	Mikkos Cassadine	Kristin Bergman
Laura Webber	Stavros Cassadine	Valentin Cassadine	Lulu Spencer	Stefan Cassadine	Sonny Corinthos	Alexis Davis	Julian Jerome	Kristina Cassadine	Ric Lansing
Courtney Matthews	Nikolas Cassadine	Esme Prince	Charlotte Cassadine	Drew Quartermaine	Kristina Davis	Sam McCall	Jason Morgan	Molly Lansing
Spencer Cassadine	Ace Cassadine	Scout Quartermaine	Lila McCall	Danny Morgan

== Descendants ==
- Stanislaus Cassadine (deceased); married Katya Cassadine (deceased)
  - Irina Cassadine (deceased); Daughter of Stanislaus and Katya
  - Unknown first name Cassadine (deceased); son of Stanislaus and Katya; married Unnamed woman (deceased)
    - Petros Cassadine (deceased); Identical cousin of Mikkos
  - Unknown first name Cassadine (deceased); Son of Stanislaus and Katya; married Unnamed woman (deceased)
    - Dimitri Cassadine; Cousin to Mikkos
  - Ivan Cassadine (deceased); son of Stanislaus and Katya; married Unnamed woman (deceased)
    - Mikkos Cassadine (died 1981); son of Ivan; married Helena Cassadine (died 2015)
      - Stavros Cassadine (died 2014); Mikkos and Helena's son; married Laura Spencer (1982–83), Lulu Spencer (2013)
        - Nikolas Cassadine (1977–); Stavros and Laura's son; married Lydia Karenin (2003), Mary Bishop (2004), Emily Quartermaine (2004–05), Hayden Barnes (2016–20), Ava Jerome (2020–)
          - Spencer Cassadine (2006–2024); Nikolas' son with Courtney Matthews
          - Ace Cassadine (2020–); Nikolas' son with Esme Prince
      - Stefan Cassadine (died 2003); Mikkos and Helena's son; married Bobbie Spencer (1996–97)
      - Alexis Davis (1964–); Mikkos' daughter with Kristin Bergman, born Natasha Cassadine; married Jasper Jacks (1999–2000), Ric Lansing (2004–06), Julian Jerome (2016)
        - Sam McCall (1980–2024); Alexis and Julian's daughter; married Jason Morgan (2011–18), Drew Quartermaine (2018)
          - Lila McCall (2004); Sam's daughter with Sonny Corinthos
          - Danny Morgan (2009–); Sam and Jason's son
          - Scout Quartermaine (2013–); Sam and Drew's daughter
        - Kristina Davis (2002–); Alexis' daughter with Sonny Corinthos; married Trey Mitchell (2012)
        - Molly Lansing (2005–); Alexis and Ric's daughter
      - Kristina Cassadine (born 1975 died 2002); Mikkos' daughter with Kristin Bergman
    - Anthony "Tony" Cassadine (died 1981); son of Ivan
    - Victor Cassadine; son of Ivan
      - Valentin Cassadine; Victor's son with Helena; married Nina Reeves (2016–2018)
        - Charlotte Cassadine; Valentin's daughter with Lulu Spencer
    - Sophia Cassadine (deceased); daughter of Ivan; married Alexei Davidovitch (deceased)
