= Duke Lavery =

Fictional character from General Hospital

- General Hospital character
- Ian Buchanan as Duke Lavery
- Portrayed by: Ian Buchanan (1986–1989, 2012–2020); Greg Beecroft (1990)
- Duration: 1986–1990; 2012–2017; 2020
- First appearance: June 6, 1986
- Last appearance: December 16, 2020
- Created by: Gloria Monty and Norma Monty
- Introduced by: Gloria Monty (1986); Frank Valentini (2012)
- Book appearances: Robin's Diary
In-universe information
- Occupation: Businessman; Mobster
- Parents: Angus McKay; Mary Fitzhugh
- Spouse: Anna Devane (1987–1989)
- Sons: Griffin Munro
- Stepdaughters: Robin Scorpio (1987–1989)
- Aunts: Janet McKay
- Other relatives: Ryan Lavery; Patrick Lavery; Camellia McKay

Duke Lavery is a fictional character from General Hospital, an American soap opera on the ABC network, primarily portrayed by Ian Buchanan. The role was created by executive producer Gloria Monty and co-head writer Norma Monty. Duke is introduced as the mysterious owner of a local night club who falls in love with police chief Anna Devane (Finola Hughes). Unbeknownst to the rest of Port Charles, Duke is laundering money for the mob but when his criminal ties cost him Anna, he teams with her ex-husband Robert Scorpio (Tristan Rogers) to bring down the mob. Duke and Anna's romance becomes quite popular among fans achieving supercouple status and rivaling Anna's romance with Robert. In 1988, Duke's feud with the Jerome crime family leads to Anna miscarrying their unborn child. Duke and Anna's story comes to a tragic end in 1989 when Duke is presumed dead. The producers would recast the role with Greg Beecroft as Jonathan Paget who was revealed to be Duke with plastic surgery only for the character to be killed off in 1990 – dying in Anna's arms due fan disapproval.

In 2012, Buchanan reprised the role of Duke and the recast was retconned as Paget is revealed to be an impostor. However, Duke's return turns out to be a similar ordeal when it is revealed that Anna's longtime foe Cesar Faison (Anders Hove) has been posing as Duke in an attempt to seduce Anna. The real Duke is rescued and reunited with Anna and they soon renew their feud with the Jeromes with Duke teaming up with Sonny Corinthos (Maurice Benard) to bring down Julian Jerome (William deVry). Duke is killed off in 2015 thanks to a botched hit on Julian's orders, leaving Anna devastated and craving justice.

== Storylines ==
=== 1986–1989 ===
Duke is introduced as a night club owner who is immediately smitten with police chief Anna Devane (Finola Hughes). Having fallen for Anna, Duke is torn between their budding romance and his ties to "Operating Tumble Dry"—a money laundering operation for the mafia. The arrival of his associate Damon Grenville (Will Jeffries) puts pressure on Duke to eliminate Anna's fellow officer Frisco Jones (Jack Wagner) who has become suspicious of the operation. Duke maintains his innocence when Frisco and his wife Felicia (Kristina Wagner) skip town after the organization frames her for theft. On the orders of one of his superiors Mr. Big—Duke proposes to Anna and she accepts only to break it off when her ex-husband Robert Scorpio (Tristan Rogers) exposes Duke's mob ties. Hoping to distance himself from the underworld, Duke appeals to Mr. Big's boss, fellow Scotland native Angus McKay (Guy Doleman) and Guy assures Duke that he will soon be free to marry Anna. Duke proposes to Anna again only for Grenville to bomb her home leading to Duke making a full confession to Anna's co-chief Burt Ramsey (Bob Hastings) – who secretly operates as Mr. Big—hoping to protect Anna and her daughter Robin (Kimberly McCullough). After he is falsely convicted of Ramsey's shooting and imprisoned, Duke teams up with Robert to expose him. Angus arranges for Duke's escape setting him up to be killed. With Robert's help, Duke fakes his death when he gets shot by Ramsey and returns to bring down Ramsey. The final showdown leaves Duke paralyzed. Duke recovers and is released from prison for his cooperation and he shocks Angus by revealing that they are father and son.

In 1987, Duke reconnects with his former flame Sister Camellia (Elizabeth Keifer) who turns out to be Duke's half-sister. Meanwhile, Angus appeals to Duke to help him end the mob war with the Jerome family. Angus commits suicide hoping it will end with him, and makes Duke promise to protect Camellia. During their trip to L'Orleans, Canada for Angus's memorial, Anna becomes suspicious of Duke and Camellia's bond. Though Duke implores her not to dig into their past, Camellia discovers she is not Angus's daughter after all and she leaves the convent and schemes to win Duke for herself by contacting sleazy reporter Mark Carlin (Gary McGurk). Carlin exposes Duke's secret past interrupting his wedding to Anna as he is arrested and hounded by the press. Four years earlier, Duke had covered up the murder of Evan Jerome when Camellia killed him in self-defense and blocked out the traumatic event. After standing trial, Camellia and Duke are acquitted and she leaves town realizing Duke will never love her. The ordeal leads to Anna leaving Duke again. The couple is married in a traditional Scottish wedding on October 19, 1987.

In 1988, Anna is kidnapped by Grant Putnam (Brian Patrick Clarke) and a desperate Duke turns to mob kingpin and Evan's father Victor Jerome (Jack Axelrod) for help. However, Robert gets to Anna first with Duke witnessing their embrace. Duke struggles to keep his associations with the Jeromes secret but things go awry when Victor's youngest son Julian (Jason Culp) takes a bullet meant for Duke and makes a deathbed request for Duke to help Victor legitimize the mob. Meanwhile, Victor's power hungry daughter Olivia (Tonja Walker) sets out to seduce Duke. Realizing she can't steal Duke away from a pregnant Anna, Olivia decides to kill him by trapping him inside a falling elevator only for Anna to fall victim instead and suffer a miscarriage. To further complicate matters, Anna is falsely accused of trying to kill Olivia and arrested. Anna is acquitted when Victor's illegitimate son Dino (Chris DeRose) is revealed to be the culprit.

In 1989, when Duke testifies against the mob, knowing they could retaliate against him and his family, Duke fakes his death in an explosion and goes into witness protection. After Victor's death, assuming the danger has passed, Duke decides to come out of hiding. In late 1989, Jonathan Paget (Greg Beecroft) came to town claiming to be Duke with plastic surgery but he is killed by Julian just as he meets up with Anna in early 1990.

=== 2012–2015 ===
In 2012, Duke is happily reunited with Anna who pushes him away still shaken by her experience with Faison—as he'd been masquerading as Duke for months. Meanwhile, Anna is torn between her feelings for Duke and her current lover Luke Spencer (Anthony Geary). Duke gives her space and gets a job working for A. J. Quartermaine (Sean Kanan) at ELQ Industries. Anna finally breaks it off with Luke and reunites with Duke; they plan to attend Felicia's wedding to Mac Scorpio (John J. York) only for Duke to be left comatose after he falls into a trap set for Anna by Liesl Obrecht (Kathleen Gati) – the woman who had helped keep him captive on behalf of Faison. Duke awakens and Anna vows to make her pay. When Tracy Quartermaine (Jane Elliot) regains control of the company ELQ leaving Duke unemployed, he instead goes to work for media mogul, Derek Wells (William deVry). Meanwhile, Duke receives word that Julian Jerome is still alive. Duke worries for Anna when she leaves town to find Faison and when he tries to find her, he is taken captive by Faison. Anna rescues him and reunites Duke with a presumed dead Robin. The happiness is short lived as Duke learns that Wells is actually Julian and Duke immediately quits his job. Duke secretly partners up with mobster Sonny Corinthos (Maurice Benard) to bring down Julian once and for all. The alliance puts a strain on Duke and Anna's relationship and Duke quits Sonny's organization but they remain friends and Duke provides Sonny with a false alibi for the night of A. J.'s murder. However, Anna is forced to arrest Duke when his statement is revealed to be false. Duke refuses to turn on Sonny and is sent to Pentonville to await trial. Impressed by Duke's loyalty, Sonny makes a plea deal that sends him to prison and frees Duke and Duke agrees to run Sonny's organization in his absence. Duke and Anna split when he calls out her hypocrisy as she had also stepped outside the law to deal with Faison. Though he pines for Anna, Duke starts dating Lucy Coe (Lynn Herring). Sonny's enforcer Shawn Butler (Sean Blakemore) convinces Duke to hire former Jerome employee Jordan Ashford (Vinessa Antoine). However, Duke is disappointed to learn Jordan is an undercover cop and makes plans to eliminate her. Meanwhile, Lucy breaks up with Duke and encourages him to reunite with Anna. After they dance the tango at the Nurses Ball, Duke and Anna declare their love for each other and make plans to run away together and Duke calls off the hit on Jordan. However, before Duke and Anna can leave town, he falls victim to a botched hit from former enforcer Carlos Rivera (Jeffrey Vincent Parise). A wounded Duke manages to meet up with Anna only to die in her arms. Anna vows to avenge Duke and bring down Julian once and for all.

In March 2016, Doctor Griffin Munro (Matt Cohen) comes to town and takes an interest in Anna. Anna is shocked when Griffin reveals that he is Duke's son.

== Development ==
=== Creation and casting ===
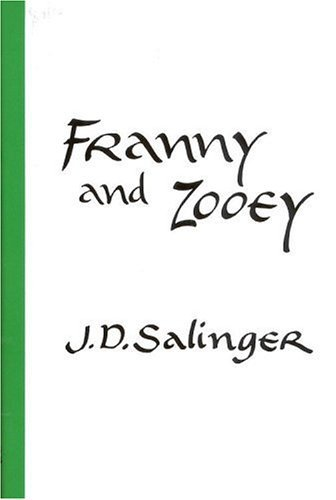
Buchanan read the story of Christ and the Fat Lady from J. D. Salinger's 1961 novel Franny and Zooey for his initial audition tape.

Ian Buchanan, had been working as a model for 10 years before he joined the cast of General Hospital in 1986 as Duke Lavery. Buchanan credited the soap as being his first professional acting gig. Buchanan had previously appeared in an episode of CBS's The Equalizer in a role that featured no dialogue The ordeal left him a bit roughed up with Buchanan questioning if he'd made the right choice to give up modeling for acting. General Hospital would change his mind about acting. Buchanan was doing performance art in New York City when executives from ABC saw one of his performances. Buchanan didn't take the network's interest seriously. "It's a leading romantic lead" Buchanan said of the original character description. According to Soap Opera Digest, the casting process was quite extensive due to executive producer Gloria Monty being so particular about crafting the role. Aside from the audition sides, Monty insisted that the character wasn't truly developed until after Buchanan was cast. They had auditioned nearly a hundred actors and no one caught Monty's eye. Then Monty heard about Buchanan who had been living in New York at the time though her contacts thought he wouldn't fit because of his lack of acting experience. The agent sent in a tape of Buchanan reading a story as a reference. "I just thought, there's a terrific amount of magnetism in it" Monty said of Buchanan's audition reel. They brought Buchanan in to audition and he got the job. Though impressed by his reading, what appealed to Monty the most was that Buchanan was an unknown. "I have always believed in never bringing on someone who has been seen before" she said. Buchanan praised Gloria Monty's for guiding him in creating Duke. "If she'd told me everything at once, I'd have had a [nervous] breakdown" he said. Monty allowed for the slow development and exploration of Duke's history. "She's so intuitive" Buchanan said of Monty. "She allows me to find things on my own" he continued.

=== Characterization ===
Gloria Monty described what she initially looked for in the role to Soap Opera Digest. "I was looking for a very rough edge to him. Someone who was physically attractive and someone who had style." Co-head writer Monty's sister, Norma Monty said Duke was conceived to be a "nightclub person, on the edge of the old times. A thirties type." Also, [Gloria] Monty intended to cast an actor without an accent. Ian Buchanan would describe Duke as a "combination good-guy/bad-guy" who very "complex." While Buchanan said he himself his own personality presents some complexities, Duke's complexities are more "extreme." Buchanan further described Duke as having a "Good heart and soul." However, he was "corrupted by society." Buchanan said he could never be friends with Duke because "He's too unpredictable." "Duke's changed as I've gotten more comfortable with my acting" Buchanan said in July 1987. He continued, "I like the way he's developed. A lot of me goes into him." In an interview with The Newfoundland Herald in 1988, Buchanan his views on Duke. "I think he is probably a lot like what I would have been if I had stayed in Scotland." He further described Duke as "grumpy, groany, bad tempered" and "always moody." When asked if Duke was "good or bad," Buchanan said, "I think he is pretty stupid sometimes." Everyone has those moments though "he really means well." Buchanan likened Duke to a modern-day Robin Hood. Duke never does anything that is "just evil or bad." He always has a reason for the bad things he does. After his 2012 return, Buchanan described the character as a "bad boy who fell in love and then wanted to be a good boy." However, it is always a struggle for Duke. He continued that "Duke, was always a little duplicitous."

=== Relationships ===
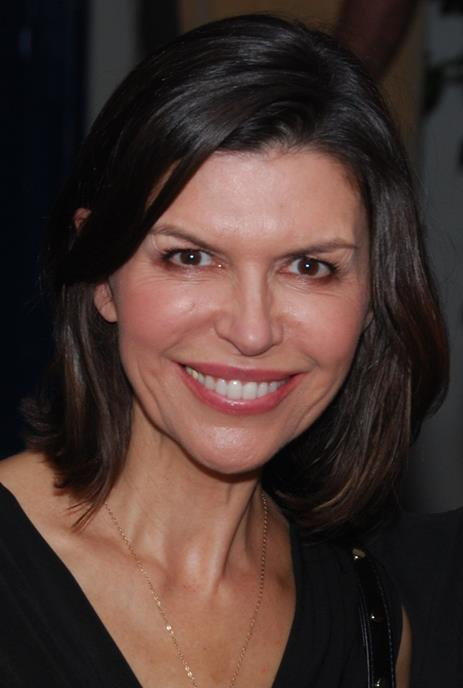
Finola Hughes portrayed Anna Devane, Duke's only major love interest within the series. Their "forbidden love" garnered fan support quickly and the duo would achieve supercouple status.

The character was conceived by Gloria Monty as a romantic interest for Finola Hughes's Anna Devane. Monty was very picky about Anna's next love interest considering the success of her pairing with Robert Scorpio played by Tristan Rogers. "I know Anna needed something a little bigger than life" Monty explained to Soap Opera Digest. She continued, "Whoever we found had to be on par if not a step better than Scorpio..." Had Anna and Duke failed, Norma Monty revealed the backup plan – "Duke would have become a very bad man... Anna would be a heroine and put him in jail." Anna and Duke found success among fans and critics alike. The romance was very melodramatic as Monty had borrowed from one of her favorite movies, the 1941 film A Woman's Face starring Joan Crawford. Monty said the duo are frequently faced with "life-and-death" and in contrast to other pairings the relationship is "forbidden love" which is why it's attractive. Buchanan praised the writing for Anna and Duke. "The way they told the love story was like an old movie." While Buchanan admittedly didn't see what the big fuss was about the chemistry between Duke and Anna, he believed it was his great relationship with Hughes off screen that had something to do with the duo's success. "I'm very comfortable around her" Buchanan said of his co-star. As a newcomer to soaps and acting, Buchanan remarked that "Working with Finola is a very high point." He continued, "We bound off each other really well because there's a great deal of trust" he said of their dynamic. Buchanan later said that while "I don't make friends easily" Hughes was the exception to the rule. Duke also serves as a father figure to Anna and Robert's young daughter, Robin (Kimberly McCullough). Buchanan appreciated the development of the family unit as opposed to the usual action packed plots.

"It just could be the start of a new kind of trouble," said Buchanan of the duo's impending nuptials in early 1987. The duo's success provided the writers under executive producer H. Wesley Kenney with the opportunity to further complicate Duke and Anna's romance by having Duke "pine" for Sister Camellia (Elizabeth Keifer) while always feels a strong connection to her first love and father of her child, Robert. Buchanan wasn't really a fan of the multiple triangles for the couple. Camellia is a woman from Duke's past whom he later learns is his half-sister. According to their backstory, Camellia was in love with Duke and they were unaware of the "connection." Wesley Kenney admitted that the undoing of Camellia's paternity was to make fans more comfortable with a potential romance. While, Duke and Anna survive the external threats, there were more obstacles to come. In 1988, the series introduced mob princess Olivia St. John (Tonja Walker) who unsuccessfully tries to seduce Duke away from Anna. Of the ongoing conflict and threats to their relationship, mostly because of how Duke makes a living and his past, Buchanan said "If it were real life I think she would have told him to go hell by now." While he tried to accommodate to the stories, Buchanan admitted that he struggled with trying to sell Duke as showing interests in other women. "It was hard for [Keifer] and Tonja Walker (Olivia) to get between Finola and I."

=== Departure (1989) ===
In the spring of 1989, it was announced that Buchanan would depart the series to do a play in Europe. Head writer Pat Falken Smith revealed that Buchanan had remained under contract with the series. Falken Smith described Buchanan's departure as a "very exciting." To facilitate Buchanan's exit, in story, Duke testifies against mobster Victor Jerome (Jack Axelrod) putting himself in danger. As Duke was written out in April 1989 in a "heroic blaze of glory" presumably killed in an explosion, there were no plans to recast or introduce a new love interest for Anna. In a 2010 interview, Buchanan admitted that at the time, he couldn't imagine staying for decades. "I was only there for three years but it seemed like 20 years of my life." In 2007 Buchanan revealed to Soaps in Depth that the question he was asked the most was why did he leave. His response: "Well I had to do something." In 2010, Buchanan revealed that sudden changes in writers and producers attributed to his departure. "I wasn't experienced enough to roll with it. It was too jarring" he admitted. Buchanan also had received offers for other work and his manager advised him to take capitalize on the opportunities while he could.

On October 27, 1989, Duke was re-introduced under head writer Gene Palumbo hiding out in a safe house. He soon devises a plan that will allow him to reunite with Anna. "Duke's journey back into her life will take some incredible turns" Palumbo said. Over the course of seven episodes, Duke undergoes plastic surgery to hide his identity. "I never really knew how that played out. I did go back and did several shows wrapped up in bandages with little slits for eyes. I'm not sure what that was about" Buchanan said of his brief return in 1989. However, Buchanan's return at the time was to facilitate a recast. When asked about how he felt about the decision to recast in 2010, Buchanan said he initially didn't think much of it, but admitted that upon further reflection, he questioned it. For a couple of episodes, Deke Anderson played the bandaged Duke. There was speculation (as indicated by articles in the Bluefield Daily Telegraph & The Index Journal ) that Anderson could possibly carry on in the role as Lavery.

Duke returned to the canvas on January 19, 1990, with Greg Beecroft in the role using the alias Jonathan Paget. The decision to recast was only made when Buchanan decided not to renew his contract in the summer of 1989. However, the recast was short lived and Beecroft's character was killed off after only seven weeks.

=== Return (2012) ===
Buchanan on return

We love Duke and Anna together too, and I thought originally, "We are really going to play it this way?" But, because I trusted that it is going to play out well, I can say we are in the good hands of our head writer, Ron Carlivati. That is the great thing, because I have gotten creeped out myself by some of the stuff I have been doing. I get totally creeped out!

— Michael Fairman, On-Air On-Soaps

While Buchanan went on to do other things, he appeared on several other soaps and in 2007 he said he'd be open to reprising the role but, "They never asked me, which was the interesting thing." He described himself as "totally open" to a return but there had never been a "serious" discussion about it. On August 23, 2012, Soap Opera Network reported on the rumor of Buchanan returning to the series. Buchanan had just made his final appearance as Ian McAllister on Days of Our Lives. Buchanan responded to fan questions about his return on Twitter with the statement "My tweets are sealed." Meanwhile, executive producer Frank Valentini teased a huge surprise for the episode airing on Monday August 27. Ian Buchanan reappeared for the first time in 23 years on August 27, 2012 and the 1990 recast was officially retconned with Paget being scripted as an impostor. "I've come to the conclusion that's why nobody can use a cell phone in the studio" Buchanan said joking to Soaps in Depth in reference to his top secret return. Buchanan didn't even tell his longtime friend and co-star Finola Hughes that he had visited the studio. Buchanan revealed that he was unaware of the story the writers had planned for him when he agreed to return. Viewers quickly realized that something had gone wrong with Duke as he had become quite un-apologetically evil as Duke had suddenly killed Steve Burton's beloved Jason Morgan. Buchanan was afraid of the fan backlash and hesitant about playing the story because it was far removed from the man viewers had come to know and love. However, even this return proved to be not all it seemed to be. On November 12, Duke was revealed to be an impostor once again as super villain Cesar Faison (Anders Hove) had disguised himself as Duke in an attempt to win Anna's affections. Faison had been holding the real Duke captive in a clinic.

=== Death (2015) ===
On March 27, 2015, Michael Logan of TV Guide reported that Buchanan's Duke was once again to be killed off. However, the network did not comment on the decision. The April 13 issue of Soap Opera Digest reported that a "back from the death character" was soon to be killed off as part of cast cuts. Errol Lewis from Soap Opera Network assumed Buchanan's Duke and General Hospital were the character and soap in question due to Logan's previous report. Leading up to Buchanan's exit, Duke is "blinded by vengeance" the actor explained. He continued, "I think [Duke]'s come to the realization that if you revenge, be prepared to dig two graves." The character is killed off on the May 12, 2015 episode—the victim of a botched mob hit. Buchanan's final scenes aired on May 14. "I have mixed feelings about it, but it is what it is" Buchanan said of his departure. Much like viewers, Buchanan himself went through a grieving process. In praise of the writing, Buchanan said "[it] was very good right up until the end." Due to the plot direction, Buchanan admitted that he expected his character to be written out and others seemed to catch on as well before Buchanan finally met with Frank Valentini about the developments. "The writing's been on the wall!" In reference to Duke's "out of character" actions prior to his death, Buchanan felt "justified" because the character had always been a "loner." Having lost Anna, Duke didn't have anyone to hold him accountable or expect better from him so he didn't do better. While some viewers questioned Duke's loyalty to fellow mobster Sonny Corinthos (Maurice Benard) over Anna, Buchanan appreciated that the writing actually acknowledged it. In just being the character, without questioning the writing, Buchanan was able to identify Duke's motives for himself – "Duke wanted to be a man again." Buchanan explained that the process was made much more difficult due to the fact that his co-stars always wanted to discuss it.

In May 2016, it was announced that Buchanan would briefly reprise his role as an "apparition" of Duke in scenes opposite Finola Hughes. While he was happy to be invited back, Buchanan admitted "I wasn't quite sure what it meant." Buchanan praised the writing for his return scenes as "poignant." He continued, "it was a really hectic day because it was a [May] sweeps week, and there were some big stunts going on and some big reveals, but of course it was lovely to be part of it." While Buchanan did not get the chance to work with Matt Cohen who had recently joined the cast as Duke's long lost son, the actor said of the plot twist, "I think it's very nice." Buchanan made his final appearance as Duke's ghost on Friday, May 27. The actor described the final scenes in which Duke and Anna share one final dance as "a way of him setting [Anna] free to move on with her life."

Buchanan returned for one episode on March 8, 2017, when his character appeared as a hallucination of the deranged Olivia St. John (Tonja Walker). In December 2020, in a fan-requested Cameo, he announced he would reprise the role once again. He returned during the December 16 episode.

== Reception ==
The character of Duke Lavery received positive reviews from both viewers and critics. During his three years at General Hospital, Candace Havens described Buchanan as one of daytime's "hottest commodities." While comparisons to Tristan Rogers' Scorpio was expected, Buchanan quickly amassed a passionate fan base of his own. According to Geoff Meeker, fans initially did not like Duke but they soon warmed up to him. By 1988, Buchanan had become a "sex symbol." In 1987, Soap Opera Digest listed the character of Duke Lavery as one of "TV's Sexiest Men." Michael Logan described Duke as General Hospital's "sly, sophisticated mob front man." Logan declared that Buchanan became a sensation with his sleek, slick, gangsteresque style." A "throwback to the matinee idols of the '30s and '40s." Duke was the first of Anna's love interests to "really excite" viewers according to Jason Bonderoff. Initial plans to make Duke a villain for Anna to bust were abandoned due to fan response. Not everyone approved of Robert and Anna because he was already with another woman. One fan likened the character to Humphrey Bogart." Bonderoff stated that Duke and Anna were the show's most popular duo since Luke and Laura. Damon L. Jacobs of We Love Soaps declared "Duke and Anna were a fan phenomenon." In 1988, Buchanan won the Soap Opera Digest Award for Best Male Newcomer. He was also nominated for Outstanding Hero Award in 1988. Jamey Giddens listed the Greg Beecroft "recast" of Duke at No. 4 on his list of "Daytime's 10 Most Insane Recast!" Soap Opera Digest said it would've been easier to just allow Duke to stay dead instead of "reuniting" him with Anna only to kill him off again. "It was a grizzly, terrifying sight – and a monumental shock to the couple's loyal fans."

Duke lives! He lives, he lives, he lives!!!!! And not only that, but he was smart enough to try to protect Robin and Anna by feeding Faison false information about his past so that they would catch on and realize something was wrong (and how great was it that Robin got to realize)!

— Mallory, Serial Drama

Michael Fairman described Buchanan's return as "quite simply a stunner" considering the character's history. The news of Duke's reappearance spread rather quickly making headlines everywhere. The revelation became a trending topic on Twitter in the United States, as well as internationally. Sara Bibel said Buchanan's unannounced return was quite the "shocker." Soaps in Depth categorized Duke's return as a "sudden revelation." TV Source Magazine listed Duke's return, along with several other "shocking returns" as the reason for General Hospital being the most improved show for the year 2012. Mallory from Serial Drama responded with several expletives and the statement "OHMIGOD MY HEAD EXPLODED." In reference to the General Hospital's lackluster surprises, Mallory said "I thought this big reveal would be neither large or revelatory but oh my WOW, was I wrong." Of Buchanan's initial return, Connie Passalacqua said "I actually screamed! And clapped! Finally, a soap keeping a plot twist secret!" Mallory further praised the final reveal that Faison had been masquerading as Duke while holding the real Duke hostage. "How freaking great was today's episode? What a payoff!" On-Air On-Soaps praised the storyline of Robin's presumed death and return as the Best Storyline of 2012 as it featured the shocking returns of both Faison and Duke.

News of the decision to kill off Duke in 2015 was very poorly received by fans and critics. However, Michael Fairman of On-Air On-Soaps suggested that Buchanan's departure could potentially propel story considering how little the character was being used. Errol Lewis from Soap Opera Network said Duke's story was ending too soon. "Beyond the fact that Ian Buchanan is a phenomenal actor, Duke is a complex character with several possible story directions ahead." Connie Passalacqua of Marlena De LaCroix said "I am stunned." She continued, "It is just so wrong!" Passalacqua hoped the producers would reconsider the decision.

In 2023, Charlie Mason from Soaps She Knows placed Duke at #22 on his ranked list of General Hospital’s 40+ Greatest Characters of All Time, commenting "May we have this dance? If only. No one grieved harder when Anna Devane’s made-man true love was kilt — sorry, killed — than we did. To this day, we haven’t given up hope that the show will resurrect him again."
