= Robert Scorpio =

Fictional character from General Hospital

- General Hospital character
- Portrayed by: Tristan Rogers
- Duration: 1980–1992; 1995; 2006; 2008; 2012–2016; 2018–2025
- First appearance: December 2, 1980
- Last appearance: July 18, 2025
- Created by: Pat Falken Smith and Margaret DePriest
- Introduced by: Gloria Monty (1980); Wendy Riche (1995); Jill Farren Phelps (2006, 2008); Frank Valentini (2012, 2018)
- Book appearances: Robin's Diary
- Spin-off appearances: General Hospital: Night Shift
In-universe information
- Other names: Robert Xavier Scorpio; Pegasus (WSB); Roger Everett-Ashton; Robert Everett-Ashton
- Occupation: District attorney (2019–present); Attorney; WSB agent (until 2019); Police Commissioner (1983-1985)
- Family: Scorpio
- Brothers: Mac Scorpio
- Spouse: Anna Devane (1976–1977, 1991–1992); Holly Sutton (1983–1992)
- Daughters: Robin Scorpio; Sasha Gilmore
- Grandsons: Noah Drake; Liam Corbin
- Granddaughters: Emma Drake; Daisy Gilmore
- Nephews: Cody Bell
- Nieces: Georgie Jones (step); Maxie Jones (step)
- First cousins: Prunella Witherspoon

Robert Scorpio is a fictional character on the ABC soap opera General Hospital, played by actor Tristan Rogers.

== Casting ==
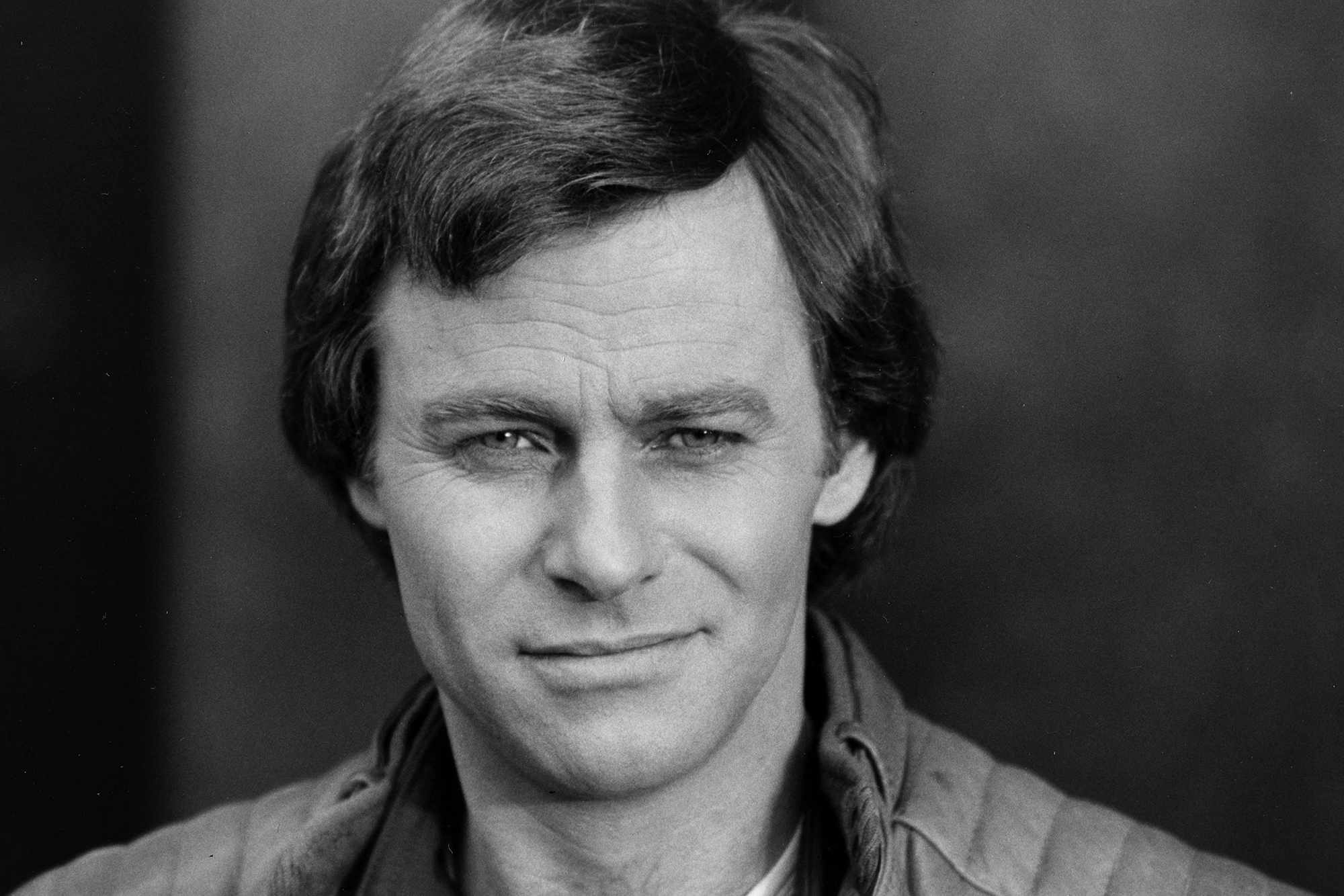
Tristan Rogers portrayed Robert, intermittently, from 1980 to 2025

Tristan Rogers originally played the role from December 2, 1980, through February 25, 1992 with two brief hiatuses in the 1980s: between December 13, 1985 to September 22, 1986 and January 13 to June 1, 1987. The popularity and longevity of the character was furthered by his involvement with the "supercouple" Luke and Laura, whose 1981 wedding brought in 30 million viewers and remains the highest-rated hour in American soap opera history.

While Rogers' Scorpio had been "killed with no body found" when he left the series in 1992, Rogers returned briefly from November 15 to 22, 1995, as Scorpio's spirit to comfort the character's daughter Robin Scorpio (Kimberly McCullough), who is dealing with the loss of her boyfriend to AIDS-related illness and is herself HIV-positive. He returned again on January 27, 2006 till March 1, 2006, this time with Scorpio being very much alive. Rogers reappeared on April 13, 2006 and left again on November 16, 2006.

From August 5, 2008 through October 21, 2008, Rogers reprised the role of Robert Scorpio on the Season 2 of SOAPnet's General Hospital: Night Shift, a prime time spin-off of General Hospital which stars Scorpio's daughter Robin. He was featured in 12 of the season's 14 episodes, and Soap Opera Digest named the appearance their "Best Return" of 2008. Rogers later reappeared on General Hospital for four episodes starting December 22, 2008, as Scorpio attends Robin's wedding.

Rogers reprised the role for a brief period in March 2012, following the departure of Kimberly McCullough in the role of Rogers' on-screen daughter, Robin. Rogers reprised the role once again on November 15, 2012 to December 18, 2012. Rogers reprised the role once more beginning on October 4, 2013 as part of the return of the character's on-screen daughter. However, head writer Ron Carlivati confirmed on November 14, 2013 that Rogers would be departing the series in order to return to The Young and the Restless as his character Colin Atkinson. He departed on January 30, 2014.

In October 2015, it was announced that Rogers will be returning to the series as Robert, while still remaining on Y&R, beginning on December 17, 2015. Rogers wrapped his return on February 2, 2016. Rogers would reprise his role again in the summer of 2016 for a short stint. He appeared from August 26 to September 9, 2016.

In March 2018, Soap Opera Digest reported that Rogers would return to the show, his return aired on April 13, 2018. Rogers departed on June 1, 2018.

In July 2018, it was announced Rogers made another return to the show. Rogers returned on July 27, 2018. In January 2019, Soaps.com reported that Rogers would be returning during the week of January 28. Rogers exited the role when Robert left Port Charles on November 12, 2024. He made an unannounced two-day guest return, from July 17 to 18, 2025.

Scorpio was last seen in the episode of October 2, 2025, recorded before Rogers's death from cancer on August 15, 2025. At the end of the episode, Anna said farewell to Robert on the Port Charles docks, giving him one final kiss and telling Scorpio that she believes that for him, "the best may be yet to come".

== Storylines ==
=== 1980–1992 ===
Robert, an Australian, has a heroic past. He was involved in many adventures with his good friend Luke Spencer and his wife Laura Spencer. He has been an international spy for the WSB spy agency, and was police commissioner of Port Charles from 1983 through 1985, then again from 1988 through 1992 when he supposedly perished in an explosion in South America. When he resigned as police commissioner in 1985 he moved to Australia with his wife Holly to start anew, but returned to Port Charles when Anna and Robin needed his help for the Mr. Big caper but after he took down the mob he return to Australia to be with his wife. (Holly was presumed dead soon afterwards, so Robert ended up returning to Port Charles.) The Interim WSB Chief returned to track down agents that were killing other agents.

Robert first showed up in Port Charles under suspicious circumstances, tracking Luke and Alexandria Quartermaine in search of an ugly black statue called "The Ice Princess" which in reality was a large uncut diamond that had a secret formula which could create carbonic snow, which could either help in medical procedures to fix severe burns or in the wrong hands create world mayhem. For months, Luke and Robert believed each other to be the enemy, but when Luke learned the truth about the Ice Princess offered to work with Robert to stop the insane Cassadine family who was bent on world domination. Robert was joined in Port Charles by Agent O'Reilly (Billie Hayes). a feisty older woman who kept him on his toes and unfortunately ended up being murdered by the Cassadines. Because of her death, a vengeful Robert and Luke immediately boarded the Cassadine Yacht, "The Titan", finding Laura there, and stayed out of sight until they got to the private island where Mikkos Cassadine revealed his plans to his esteemed group of guests. Robert, Luke and Laura found help from Tiffany Hill, the mistress of Victor Cassadine who wanted to stop Mikkos from going through with his evil plans. While Robert and Laura held Mikkos's guards at gunpoint, Luke confronted Mikkos which resulted with Mikkos freezing to death in his own ice chamber and Luke frantically trying to guess the code to unfreeze Port Charles. Luke succeeded, and they all returned to Port Charles as heroes, with Tiffany joining them. Luke and Robert agreed the formula and the ice machine needed to be destroyed to avoid the risk of falling into the wrong hands. Robert left the W.S.B. over disagreements over destroying the ice machine and formula, and for a while dated Tiffany, but the spark that had captured them on the island fizzled after a while. Robert was Luke's best man when he married Laura in a big ceremony in November 1981. At the wedding, Robert was reacquainted with Mikkos's vengeful widow, Helena Cassadine, who came to town to make a huge donation to General Hospital but secretly put a curse on Luke and Laura.

In early 1982, Robert took up with feisty reporter Jackie Templeton (Demi Moore) who had come to town searching for her missing sister. Robert was helping Luke search for the missing Laura, and Jackie was searching for her own sister, Laura Templeton, a model whom Laura Spencer resembled. Robert and Luke were thrust into another episode of world intrigue when David Gray, the rightful heir to the throne of a fictional kingdom of Malkuth, was revealed to have arranged for Laura Spencer's disappearance in exchange for Helena's financing his coup. David Gray was killed in a sword fight with Luke, and Robert was left to console his friend when it was believed Laura had drowned at sea. Luke and Robert next became involved in an oil scam orchestrated by Holly Sutton's crime family, the Durbans, but they managed to stop them as well from succeeding in their scheme to fleece the residents of Port Charles.

Robert and Holly Sutton married under strange circumstances. Holly was pregnant with the presumed dead Luke Spencer's baby and was about to be deported, so Robert stepped in and married her. She ended up miscarrying the baby, but she and Robert eventually fell in love. Jackie Templeton was upset by this turn of events and turned vindictive against Robert for jilting her. Robert had a bad relationship with his brother Mac Scorpio when he first came to town because he blamed Mac for the death of their parents. Eventually, the brothers patched up their relationship. Robert was presumed dead along with his wife, Anna Devane, in 1992. Their teenage daughter Robin Scorpio was left behind to be raised by Robert's brother Mac Scorpio. Anna Devane reappeared in 2001, but told her family Robert was dead. However, Robert resurfaced in 2006, when Port Charles was stricken with a deadly strain of encephalitis. It came out he was forced by the WSB to be incognito for 15 years as the only way to keep his families alive; he had no choice but to let them think he was dead.

Robert married Anna Devane when the two were on assignment for the WSB in Italy. The two were married in secret before either character showed up in Port Charles. After Holly "died", Anna and Robert remarried in 1991. When the evil Cesar Faison kidnapped Anna, Robert left Port Charles for South America to rescue her.

=== 2006, 2008 ===
Both Robert and Anna turned up alive in Port Charles in 2006 much to the surprise of their daughter, Robin. During his return in 2006, Robert told Robin he was in the South Pacific trying to track a lethal dose of encephalitis. He said he quarantined a village and torched it, but two potential carriers slipped through the net: one was a chimp and the other was Luke Spencer. Robert and Robin's relationship was briefly strained due to him not telling her he was alive, but they soon became close again. When Anna returned in the summer of 2007, she explained Robert was deep undercover on a mission to recover black market alien remains. Later, at the end of the summer both Anna and Robert were assigned on a mission in the Amazon. The character then appears on the prime time spin-off General Hospital: Night Shift when he narrowly escapes a plane crashes near Port Charles. Jagger Cates rescues him and brings him to General Hospital where it is revealed he has a brain tumor. During an MRI, Patrick Drake tells Robert that the brain tumor is the result of another tumor, and tells Robert he has colon cancer. Writer Sri Rao explained the storyline, stating "When I decided to bring Robert Scorpio back to Port Charles, I wanted him and Robin to come together as a family. The best way to do that would be to have Robert present with a medical condition." Rao went on to explain the cultural reasons for using colon cancer as a plot point, stating "I chose colon cancer because it's a disease that affects so many men and women in this country – but we don't really talk about it. [...] This is one of the cancers that can most easily be prevented if only people will get screened. Hopefully, we can raise awareness of this with our viewers." Rao reached out to the National Colorectal Cancer Research Alliance to make sure he conveyed the story "authentically, responsibly and realistically". Robert falls into a coma, and both Mac Scorpio (John J. York) and Anna Devane (Finola Hughes) make appearances on the series to support the character. York took the opportunity to speak out and raise awareness on colon cancer. While in a coma, Robert dreams of Anna, Robin, Luke Spencer, Sean Donely and Tiffany Donely in a flashback to their old life in the 1980s. He comes out of the coma on October 14, 2008 and leaves for further treatment in Europe.

=== 2012–14 ===
In February 2012, Robert returns to Port Charles, after receiving news Robin had died in an explosion. Robert's guilt over what he deems as his inability to protect Robin prompts him to consider suicide by jumping off of a bridge. However, a despondent Robert is found by Luke, who tells Robert Ethan Lovett is his son, in an effort to pull Robert back from the brink. Luke, along with assistance from Holly, concocts an elaborate story that Ethan had been abducted by Helena Cassadine (Ethan had actually agreed to go along with Luke's lie), prompting him to leave Port Charles with Holly to rescue "his" son. As a result of this, Anna is left to grieve for Robin on her own. Over the next several months, a burgeoning romantic relationship begins to develop between Anna and Luke, with Luke continuing to keep quiet about his lie. It is only following a trip to Switzerland, where Anna had been led to believe a very much alive Robin had been held, that Luke comes clean. An infuriated Anna then demands Luke track down Robert and admit to what he had done. Luke eventually does so off-screen, with it being implied the two men came to blows. In November 2012, Robert returns to Port Charles at the behest of Luke, who has informed him of the return of the long-presumed dead Duke Lavery. Robert, much as Luke had, suspects there is something amiss about "Duke's" return from the grave. Robert is later intrigued by word Olivia Falconeri claims to have seen a different face in a vision about Duke, and recruits Elizabeth Webber to produce a sketch of the other face. When the sketch is completed, it bears a striking similarity to Robert's long-time enemy, Cesar Faison, who is masquerading as Duke in order to get closer to Anna. It is revealed "Duke" really is Faison. Anna though still believes the real Duke is alive. Robert, John, and Anna confronts Dr. Obrecht, and then find the real Duke Lavery. Robert then finds Robin alive, but Dr. Obrecht injects him, so no one knows. Anna finds Robert unconscious, and Robert is put into a coma. Robert wakes up from his coma on October 4, 2013 and is greeted by Anna and Mac. After some initial skepticism on Anna's part, he finally convinces her he saw Robin alive just before Dr. Obrecht put him in the coma. They decide not to tell Mac in order to spare him the anguish of false hope if Robert is wrong. After Faison escapes from prison with the help of Obrecht, and Anna learns from Nikolas Cassadine that Obrecht has been to Cassadine Island, Robert and Anna decide to pursue them to Cassadine Island, hoping to find Robin still alive.

Robert and Anna are held prisoner on Cassadine Island by Jerry Jacks in the same laboratory where Jerry had kept Robin. After several weeks of captivity, Robert and Anna manage to escape in November 2013. They capture Jerry and take him back to Port Charles as a prisoner. The team then goes to Spoon Island and finds Robin alive, leading to an emotional reunion. They capture Obrecht and Faison. Anna decides the only way to keep Faison out of their lives for good is to kill him. Robert is reluctant to go along at first, but in the end when he sees Anna is determined to kill Faison, he joins in her in a joint execution, saying, "If we do this, we'll do it together." Robert covers their tracks and it remains unknown what really happened to Faison. He later announces he'll leave Port Charles to help out Holly and her son Ethan, who got himself in trouble with a scam.

=== 2015-18 ===
In December 2015, Robert joins Anna and Patrick to rescue Robin who is being held by Jerry Jacks again. They storm the compound where Jerry announces Robin is dead, however she actually faked her death to trick Jerry. After Robert and Anna sent Jerry to Steinmauer, they were reunited with Robin and they all went home.

Robert was there for Robin and Patrick's second wedding in January 2016.

Robert briefly returns to Port Charles in August to warn Luke's family about Valentin Cassadine who was already arrested and extradited to Greece.

In April 2018, Robert joins Anna's search for Faison's previously unknown son Heinrik Faison in Switzerland. He was shocked to discover Heinrik was also Anna's son, but he understood why she kept it from everyone.

In May, Peter August was exposed as Heinrik and Jason Morgan was going to kill him, but Anna stopped him and Peter was arrested under Robert's orders. When Peter escapes from jail, Robert leaves town to sort out the mess that was made.

In July, Robert returns to Port Charles to extradite Peter to Steimauer after learning Peter has been found, but Robert later shelved the charges against Peter for Anna's sake. He later works with Hamilton Finn to rescue Anna who was kidnapped by mysterious men who wanted Finn to bring Cassandra Pierce out of her coma. Robert and Finn's half-brother, Harrison Chase rescue Finn and Anna as Cassandra is kidnapped by a mysterious Cassadine. Robert leaves town to find her.

=== 2019 ===
Robert returns to Port Charles in early 2019 with intel on why Anna suddenly went blind. Their search for answers leads them to Dr. Arthur Cabot who went blind as well. They restore Cabot's sight who tells them Anna and her sister Alex were part of his original study to transfer memories from one person to another.

In March, Robert joins Sonny Corinthos (Maurice Benard) in Turkey to find and rescue Sonny's son, Dante Falconeri (Dominic Zamprogna) who has been on an undercover for the WSB since June 2018. After a shootout with Raj Patel and his men, Robert brings Sonny and Dante home.

In April, Robert reveals the possibility to Anna that Peter may not be her son after all, but Anna decides not to pursue that theory because she wants a relationship with Peter.

In June, Robert was booted out of the WSB by being forced to retire despite the fact he still has WSB contacts. He later becomes the new District Attorney for Port Charles.

=== 2024 ===
In October 2024, it was revealed that Sasha Gilmore (Sofia Mattsson) is his daughter with Holly after Holly tells her daughter at the Quartermaine Mansion to end her relationship with Mac's son Cody Bell (Josh Kelly), because they are first cousins.

== Reception ==
In 2023, Charlie Mason from Soaps She Knows placed Robert at #19 on his ranked list of General Hospital’s 40+ Greatest Characters of All Time, commenting that "James Bond’s got nothing on Port Charles’ answer to 007, the smoothest of operators and shrewdest of characters. Even now that he’s switched gears and become district attorney, many a fan wouldn’t mind calling him “the spy who loved me.”"
