= Gregory Beecroft =

American actor

Gregory Beecroft is an American actor known for roles on several soap operas in the 1970s and 1980s. He is the oldest of five children. After his parents divorced when Greg was twelve years old, he and his siblings split their time between Dallas, Texas, where their mother had taken a job, and Warwick, Rhode Island, where their father lived. He studied drama at the University of New Hampshire, but left before graduating.

In 1981, he landed the part of Tony Reardon on Guiding Light. He stayed at Guiding Light from 1981 to 1985. Afterwards, he landed the role of Brock Lombard on As the World Turns (1988–1989). He also played the role of Duke Lavery on General Hospital (1989–1990).

Beecroft has several siblings, including actor David Beecroft. David also auditioned for the role of Tony Reardon.

He now lives in the Dallas area.
