= Valentin Cassadine =

Fictional character from General Hospital

- General Hospital character
- Portrayed by: James Patrick Stuart
- Duration: 2016–present
- First appearance: July 8, 2016
- Created by: Jean Passanante and Shelly Altman^{1}
- Introduced by: Frank Valentini^{1}
In-universe information
- Other names: Valentin Mikkosovich Cassadine; Theo Hart; Ivan Theodore; Gaspar LeBlanc; Will Cortlandt
- Occupation: Businessman; Mercenary; Financier; Terrorist; WSB Agent
- Family: Cassadine
- Father: Victor Cassadine
- Mother: Helena Cassadine
- Stepfather: Mikkos Cassadine
- Half-brothers: Stavros Cassadine; Stefan Cassadine
- Half-sisters: Irina Cassadine
- Spouse: Nina Reeves (2016–2018)
- Children: Charlotte Cassadine
- Grandparents: Ivan Cassadine; Basil Romanov; Agatha Romanov
- Aunts and uncles: Mikkos Cassadine; Tony Cassadine; Sophia Davidovitch
- Nephews: Nikolas Cassadine
- First cousins: Stavros Cassadine; Stefan Cassadine; Alexis Davis; Kristina Cassadine
- Other relatives: Sam McCall; Kristina Davis; Molly Lansing; Spencer Cassadine; Danny Morgan; Lila McCall; Scout Cain; Ace Cassadine

Valentin Cassadine is a fictional character from General Hospital, an American soap opera on the ABC network. The character was initially conceived in 2009 by head writer Robert Guza Jr., as a previously unknown member of the wealthy Cassadine family looking to wreak havoc on both the Cassadine and Spencer families. However, initial plans for the character's introduction were delayed and completely abandoned by 2010. In 2016, it was announced that All My Children alumnus James Patrick Stuart had joined the cast in the mystery role of Theo – who is revealed to be Valentin. Valentin is known for being the most evil of the Cassadine sons, having been disowned by his father at a very young age. At one point, he poisons his mother Helena (Constance Towers).

Stuart's performance has been met with critical acclaim, having garnered him three consecutive Daytime Emmy Award nominations for Outstanding Supporting Actor in a Drama Series in 2020, 2021 and 2022.

== Storylines ==
In October 2009, a deathly ill Helena Cassadine (Constance Towers) confides in her longtime enemy Luke Spencer (Anthony Geary) that she needs his help to fend off her evil stepson Valentin. According to Helena, the illegitimate Valentin had been disowned by his father Mikkos (John Colicos) upon his birth, denying him the privileges of being a Cassadine.

Helena contacts Valentin hoping to use him against her rebellious grandson, Nikolas (Tyler Christopher) but instead, Valentin overpowers Helena taking over the family's private island in Greece and Nicholas slowly poisoning Helena. Valentin's henchmen try to keep Helena and Luke from escaping only for Nikolas to come to her rescue. She warns everyone Nicholas has promised to destroy not only the Cassadines, but also the Spencers. Mikkos's daughter Alexis Davis (Nancy Lee Grahn) reveals she had only heard of her brother's treachery toward their father specifically, but Alexis had come to believe the never before seen Valentin was only a front for Helena and her schemes.

Luke later accuses Helena of having had Valentin murdered. She admits she thought Valentin had indeed died before realizing he is actually alive and well. Much like Luke and Alexis, Nikolas believes Valentin is long dead and Helena is just using the threat of Valentin to manipulate him.

In July 2016, fisherman Theo Hart claims to have been trapped on Cassadine Island due to bad weather. Jason (Billy Miller) and Sam (Kelly Monaco) agree to let him stay. Theo feigns surprise at Nikolas (Nick Stabile) also being on the island, and explains they met briefly when Nikolas was a teenager. Theo announces his plans to leave the island when the storm clears only to return and take several hostages at gun point and reveal himself to be Valentin.

He then separates Nikolas and Ava Jerome (Maura West) from the group, demanding he sign over his entire fortune in exchange for Valentin sparing the lives of his friends and family. When Valentin threatens to kill Ava anyway, a struggle ensues and Nikolas is seemingly shot falling out a window to his presumed death. Ava attempts to seduce Valentin only to attack him and attempt her escape. Once caught she returns to the group and tells her version of events to Nik's devastated mother. Valentin shoots Kevin Collins (Jon Lindstrom) who comes to Laura's defence during the group's escape.

Valentin decides his plan isn't working and while escaping himself sabotages the group's boat, stranding them on the island until a mysterious woman comes to their aid. Using his alias, Valentin makes his way to Port Charles where he has a one-night stand with Nina Reeves (Michelle Stafford), accidentally leaving behind his phone as he goes off to kidnap his grand nephew Spencer (Nicolas Bechtel). His plans are foiled when Nina finds the phone and tips off Jason and Spencer's uncle, Sonny Corinthos (Maurice Benard), allowing PCPD commissioner Jordan Ashford (Vinessa Antoine) to make the arrest. As Valentin is extradited to Greece, he assures Lulu Spencer (Emme Rylan) and Dante Falconeri (Dominic Zamprogna) he isn't involved in her father's apparent death and he also promises to see Nina again despite her turning him in.

Valentin resurfaces in October 2016 to confront his ex-lover Claudette Beaulieu (Bree Williamson). On Halloween, Valentin claims the Cassadine fortune, starting with the Cassadine home Wyndemere. Valentin also appeals to his sister Alexis to help prove the legitimacy of his claim on the family fortune. He pays a visit to Nina, claiming no ill will toward her for sabotaging his attempt to kidnap Spencer, insisting he was so taken with her he lost his head. He promises to visit again, insisting they feel a mutual attraction, however Nina denies this.

Meanwhile, WSB Agent Anna Devane (Finola Hughes) puts Valentin on notice that he will regret causing trouble for anyone in Port Charles. He retorts with a Latin phrase which startles Anna as it is used by WSB agents; it means "open your eyes". He then shocks Anna's stepson Griffin Munro (Matt Cohen) by claiming Charlotte – Griffin's daughter with Claudette – is actually his child, even agreeing to a DNA test. Valentin discovers Nina's interest in children when he finds her reading a book of baby names. As he leaves, he encourages her to read the page containing his own name, linking him to Valentine's Day and love.

With the help of her colleague Diane Miller (Carolyn Hennesy), Alexis discovers Mikkos had changed his will before his death, willing the family fortune to his oldest living male heir, Valentin. Anna and Griffin unsuccessfully try to keep Charlotte away from Valentin, but he is awarded custody by the courts and moves into Wyndemere, all the time hinting at a connection to Anna she can't place. Laura leaves Wyndemere in disgust, and although Valentin offers to let her stay, with a loaded comment about the two being family, she leaves anyway. Nina discovers Valentin is actually the father of Charlotte, the lost little girl who appeared in her office. They bond over their mutual dislike of Ava and Charlotte's mother, Claudette, due to Ava having stolen Nina's husband and Claudette having deceived Nina's brother Nathan about Charlotte's paternity.

Valentin begins to pursue Nina romantically, the two sleeping together. Nina asserts she sees a vulnerable, good side to Valentin and adores his daughter Charlotte, a little girl she now believes is motherless after the alleged death of Claudette, who was last seen boarding a plane with Valentin. In 2020, following Nikolas' return the previous year, it is revealed Valentin is not Mikkos' son, but in fact Helena's and his brother Victor's.

On October 8, 2021, it was revealed that Victor Cassadine is actually Valentin's father making him a true Cassadine after all. Wyndemere should now return to Valentin.

== Development ==
=== Creation and casting ===
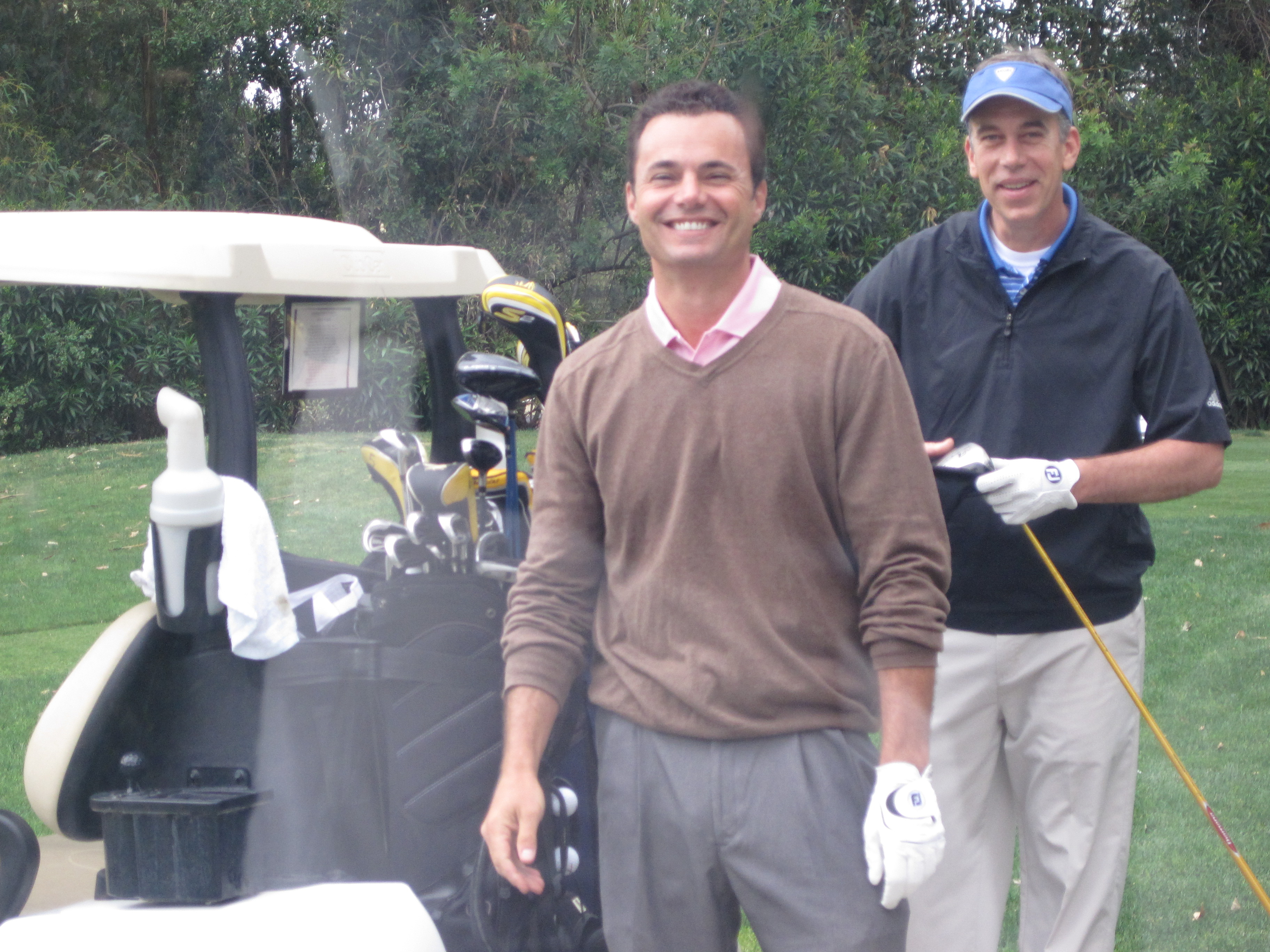
Matt Borlenghi (left) was originally cast in the role of Valentin in 2009, before plans to introduce the character were abandoned.

In late September 2009, it was announced that Matt Borlenghi, best known to daytime viewers for his portrayal of Brian Bodine on All My Children had been cast in the role of Valentin Cassadine. Borlenghi expressed his excitement about joining the cast, admitting that he always wanted to work on the series; "I can't imagine anywhere I'd rather be right now" he continued. The actor further stated "I don't know the extent of my stay, but I can only hope it's long enough for me to hang my shingle up and get down and dirty with Valentin." However, the character of Valentin seemed to have been abandoned completely until 2013, when it was rumored that daytime actor Vincent Irizarry had been hired as a recast. Borlenghi took to Twitter with "Wasn't enough that I got Franco'd before? Hurts." Then head writer Ron Carlivati denied the rumors immediately, claiming that Borlenghi had no reason to be upset. Borlgenhi released a statement in which he explained that the false news "opened an old wound."

On June 16, 2016, Soap Opera Digest reported that another All My Children alumnus James Patrick Stuart known for his portrayal of Will Cortlandt would debut in July. Soaps in Depth reported that Stuart would debut as Theo on July 8. "I get bored easily and I love a smorgasbord", the actor said. So when his agent informed him about General Hospital, Stuart couldn't turn it down. At the time, "I was bouncing between soccer games with my children and all of a sudden" Stuart's agent contacted him about Frank Valentini's interest in him for the role. Stuart consulted with his wife who encouraged him to meet with the producers. "The role that they were talking about was so fun, it just seemed like it would be exactly the way that I would want to go back." The only catch was that Stuart had to cancel a trip to Hawaii that conflicted with taping dates. The casting reunites Stuart with his former All My Children co-star Genie Francis as well as Jon Lindstrom, the husband of his former co-star and close friend Cady McClain. While he was flattered to have been handpicked for the role, Stuart credits his close friends Ricky Paull Goldin and Michael E. Knight (also former co-star) with convincing him to sign on. "To have the chance to get back and do it again has been really yummy" the actor said of his return to daytime. When asked if he would commit to the series long term during his second stint, Stuart joked "Right now, [the show and I are] definitely dating."

=== Characterization ===
Borlenghi described Valentin as "morally bankrupt." James Patrick Stuart insisted that he wouldn't have taken a role that was too "subtle." The character was presented to Stuart as "brash and take no prisoners." Stuart said Theo might have similarities to his former character Will Cortlandt. Stuart said the character has "literal crazy confidence." Stuart said that initially, "you're struck by the fact that this guy is just being a jerk." However, "the more you play it, the more fleshed-out he becomes." Stuart declared that he had no interest in seeing Valentin become a good guy because he relished in "playing the misunderstood [bleep]hole." Valentin "is not the guy who comes in a raises an eyebrow" Stuart insisted any potential plans to reform the character. The actor continued that Valentin "has much to say. He's been wronged and he needs to make sure that you understand that. He has a specific agenda!"

=== Introduction ===
Borlenghi was expected to make his debut on October 14, 2009, and the actor had already reported for his first day of work when he learned of plans to postpone the role due to several creative changes behind the scenes, including the departure of Sarah Joy Brown as Claudia Zacchara, Jonathan Jackson returning to the role of Lucky Spencer replacing Greg Vaughan and the arrival of James Franco. Head writer Robert Guza, Jr. explained that "sweeps and the immediate aftermath are so full that frankly, I didn't have room for it." In December 2009, Soap Opera Digest reported that the producers wanted Valentin "beefed up" and made plans to pen a "powerful story" for his arrival. By late January 2010, Borlenghi had still not appeared and a spokesperson for the series claimed that plans for Valentin were still on hold, but would eventually come to fruition. In February 2010, Constance Towers commented on the character's delayed introduction: "We have been serenading his entrance for quite awhile, [sic] but he hasn't made it yet. The character will be probably the only person that Helena is truly afraid of." However, plans for Valentin's introduction never came to fruition.

On July 1, 2016, Jamey Giddens of Daytime Confidential reported that James Patrick Stuart's character Theo was to be revealed as the infamous Valentin Cassadine. To avoid suspicion, Valentin creates Theo and assumes a Greek accent. Stuart himself was quite shocked by the plot twist as he was given very little information on the character. The producers asked if Stuart could play a Greek fisherman and he agreed unaware of the character's true identity. Stuart admitted to being nervous about learning some Greek words for the role. While the revelation of his true identity shocks everyone on Cassadine Island, head writer Jean Passanante hinted that it would also "leave at least one of them fighting for their life." While Valentin does not intend to harm his nephew Nikolas (Stabile), he isn't fazed by his presumed death which he knows benefits him in the long run. According to Stuart, Valentin's reaction just shows how dangerous he is. Valentin is bitter because he has been deprived of what Nikolas grew up with. Despite the character being sent to prison on August 12, Soaps in Depth reported that Valentin was slated to reappear. Stuart described his initial stint as "sort of like a 10-day getting-to-know-you period." After his first stint, Stuart's manager informed him that a return had not been set in stone which worked out perfectly for the actor as he took time to book a play and spend time with his family.

=== Return ===
The November 7 edition of Soaps in Depth reported that Stuart was set to return for a lengthier stint and had already been filming. After wrapping his first stint, Stuart wasn't aware of any plans to bring Valentin back until he was contacted by the series several weeks prior and they told him "We've got a ton of stuff for you to do!" "I hit the ground running" Stuart said of his returns as he filmed five episodes in three days. Stuart had much more information about his character upon his return. "Last time, [Frank Valentini] didn't really give me much of a backstory and this time, he did." However, Stuart was warned to keep quiet about the information. "There's a reason Valentin's come to town, and it makes sense" the actor explained. Stuart continued, "I actually think it's really cool." Valentin is adamant about getting what he feels he is owed, the Cassadine fortune and "He's not secretive about it." He has "massive chip on his shoulder" due to his father Mikkos not fighting for him to avoid upsetting his stepmother Helena. Valentin was shipped off and did not have any contact with his family for years so he doesn't have an allegiance to family.

Nikki Gantt from Soap Opera Spy speculated that Valentin could be the father of Charlotte (Scarlett Fernandez), the daughter of his ex-lover Claudette Beaulieu (Bree Williamson) whom Claudette attempts to pass off as the child of her cop ex-husband, Nathan West (Ryan Paevey) to protect Charlotte from Valentin. Meanwhile, SoapHub speculated that putting Valentin on Nathan's radar was to make way for the writers to reveal Valentin to be Nathan's long-lost father—a mystery that had been speculated on for two years.

=== Exit and returns (2024–2025) ===
In July 2024, Stuart was written out of the serial when Valentin went on the run with Charlotte (Fernandez) following his involvement with the Pikeman organization; he returned in December for three episodes when Valentin follows Charlotte in reunion with Lulu (Alexa Havins Bruening), and escapes following a shoot-out by the WSB. He returned again on January 28, 2025; and departed again on March 24, when Valentin is sent to Steinmauer prison is Switzerland. Stuart returned to the role on September 8 of the same year, when Jack Brennan (Chris McKenna) reaches out to secure information regarding double agent Colette Moreau.

=== Romances ===
Upon his arrival in Port Charles, Valentin takes a romantic interest in Nina Clay (Michelle Stafford) and they have a one-night stand. According to James Patrick Stuart, Valentin and Nina "have a lot more in common than just lust." He continued, "There's an attraction there for a reason and they are really going to click."

== Reception ==
The announcement of Stuart's casting was well received by fans and critics alike. Fans took to social media to congratulate Stuart on his new gig and welcome him to the show. "The summer keeps getting hotter on 'General Hospital'," Soap Opera Spy said of the casting news. Stuart's memorable tenure on and exit from All My Children immediately struck a chord with longtime ABC soap fans after nearly 25 years and Dan J. Kroll said "That means Stuart's upcoming General Hospital stint better deliver." Jamey Giddens of Daytime Confidential described Valentin as "one of the most talked about, yet previously unseen, supervillains" in the history of the series. "This could be exactly the kind of game-changer this soap needs," Giddens said in praise of Stuart's casting. "Intriguing casting news" Michael Fairman said in reaction the announcement of Stuart's casting. "And that role is turning out to be quite the humdinger!" Michael Fairman exclaimed in reaction to the news of the character's true identity. Jenn Bishop of TVSource Magazine raved about Stuart as "excellent casting." "He's very entertaining," Bishop later said of Valentin. Soaps in Depth said in praise of Valentin's introduction, "Go figure – sometimes, the wait is really worth it!" Donald Thompson of Canyon News believed that Valentin was "evil enough" to fulfill the much-needed role of a resident villain, which the series had not had since Helena Cassadine's demise.

In 2020, Candace Young from Soaps She Knows put Valentin on her list of the hottest soap opera villains, saying that the character is "deeply feared and dangerous, perhaps the most villainous of those bearing the wealthy family's name. While he may be cold and calculating, he's not immune to the love of a beautiful woman and possesses considerable seductive charms."

== Notes ==
1. The character's scripting as the illegitimate son of Mikkos Cassadine was shown in the summer of 2009 under executive producer Jill Farren Phelps and head writer Robert Guza, Jr. However, the character was further developed by head writers Jean Passanante and Shelly Altman and first appeared under executive producer Frank Valentini in 2016.
