= Ava Jerome =

- General Hospital character
- Portrayed by: Maura West
- Duration: 2013–present
- First appearance: May 8, 2013
- Created by: Ron Carlivati
- Introduced by: Frank Valentini
In-universe information
- Other names: Denise DeMuccio; Ava Cassadine
- Occupation: Art dealer; Mob heiress; Pub landlady
- Family: Jerome
- Parents: Victor Jerome; Delia Ryan
- Siblings: Olivia St. John; Julian Jerome
- Spouse: Nikolas Cassadine (2020–2023) Drew Cain (m. 2026)
- Children: Kiki Jerome; Avery Corinthos
- Stepchildren: Scout Cain
- Nieces and nephews: Sam McCall; Lucas Jones; Leo Falconeri

Ava Jerome is a fictional character from General Hospital, an American soap opera on the ABC network. The role is portrayed by three-time Daytime Emmy Award winner Maura West, who made her first appearance on May 8, 2013.

Ava is part of the Jerome crime family; she is the only daughter of Victor Jerome (Jack Axelrod) and Ryan's Hope's Delia Ryan (Ilene Kristen), and the younger half-sister of Evan Jerome, Olivia St. John (Tonja Walker) and Julian Jerome (Jason Culp, William deVry). Introduced by executive producer Frank Valentini and created by head writer Ron Carlivati, Ava is introduced as the ex-lover of Robert "Franco" Frank (James Franco, Roger Howarth), and mother of his presumed daughter Lauren Katherine "Kiki" Jerome (Kristen Alderson, Hayley Erin), the missing heiress to the Quartermaine family fortune. An art dealer by day, in July 2013, Ava is revealed to be the previously unmentioned youngest child of the infamous Jerome crime family, introduced to the series in the late 1980s. Ava's attempt to use her daughter's faked paternity to get power at ELQ Industries is a part of her scheme with big brother, Julian Jerome to reclaim their family's territory from resident mob boss, Sonny Corinthos (Maurice Benard).

West's performance has been met with critical acclaim, winning her the Daytime Emmy Award for Outstanding Lead Actress in a Drama Series in 2015.

== Casting and creation ==
Maura West, previously recognized for her portrayal of Carly Tenney Snyder on As the World Turns, was cast in the newly-created role of Ava in April 2013.

In early April, Jamey Giddens and Jillian Bowe of Daytime Confidential reported a rumor that the Daytime Emmy Award winner Maura West, best known for her role as Carly Snyder on As the World Turns, was set to join the cast in a top-secret role. On April 24, nearly two weeks after Confidential's original report, Soap Opera Digest and other soap opera media confirmed the news and revealed that West had joined the cast in the newly created role of Ava Jerome, and was slated to appear sometime in May. Soaps In Depth editor Richard M. Simms immediately speculated that the character shared a connection to the infamous 1980s Jerome crime family. West made her debut on May 8, 2013.

In an interview with Soap Opera Digest, West revealed that her agent, Mamie Sparer, was contacted by General Hospital casting director Mark Teschner, who had her come in to meet with executive producer Frank Valentini, and that the meeting prompted her to sign on to appear as Ava. Of her role, West admitted the part was only scheduled as a five-day stint; however, she was offered a contract before she even began work on the soap. In an interview with TV Guide's Michael Logan, West was asked what made her take on the role of Ava. She admitted, "Next to nothing. You have to put your faith in people, which was hard because I'd never met [executive producer] Frank Valentini and [head writer] Ron Carlivati, but they are so fun, so infectious! But, then, Ava was not intended to hang around all that long."

When asked about the casting of West in the role, Valentini and Carlivati admitted they both felt West was perfect for the role. "When Ron and I had talked about this character, there were several actresses we had in mind initially, and a couple of things didn’t work out. Then I thought about Maura, and when I said it to Ron, we both said, 'Absolutely!' So we both kind of stumbled upon it at the same time, because we are both not physically in the same city, we are often on the phone," Valentini revealed in an interview in December 2013. Valentini also admitted that he knew there might be some resistance on West's part when it came to accepting the role. He explained, "I understood she wasn’t necessarily into the idea of doing another soap, because she had not the best experience on another show. But, I thought let’s do it and let’s see what happens." Carlivati also mentioned being a fan of West's from her time on World Turns, stating, "I was a fan of hers from As the World Turns. And when you first see Maura, she is so classically beautiful. I was not that familiar with As the World Turns, but when you would turn it on, you would see this beautiful woman who just seems to be appropriate as a soap actress."

== Character development ==
According to West, Ava has a lot going on; "She's mysterious and strong and just has all of the characteristics of a great character." West explained that Ava is very reminiscent of her earlier portrayal of Carly on As the World Turns. However, she argued that Ava is a bit more "sophisticated." The characters are not the same, "but there are certain colors that are similar" West continued. In an interview with Boston Herald, West said of Ava, "There’s a ton of mystery to Ava. [...] She’s full of strength and has undertones of vulnerability." She also said she didn't originally know that Ava was part of the infamous Jerome crime family, but in fact played her as if she possibly could be. She remarked, "am certainly playing her and making an early assumption that she is. This woman isn’t all poise and ladylike. There’s grit under there."

West, on playing a female gangster (2013)

It's awesome! And it makes Ava even cooler. She's like, "So what if I'm not a guy? I'm an heir!" She didn't marry into the mob. She is the mob. When you grow up watching your father come home and wash blood off his hands, you don't give it much mind. There are no rules when you've been raised in a world like that — and that's very freeing as an actor. I loooove Ava! I love that she is so poised — almost hyper-poised — as she struts around town yet she's also gritty, angry, really abrasive. I love that she's hiding things.

— Michael Logan, TV Guide

If Ava's connection to the notorious Jerome crime family panned out, not only would West's arrival cause trouble for Port Charles's local kingpin, Sonny Corinthos (Maurice Benard), but there was also great storyline potential for Ian Buchanan and Finola Hughes's Duke Lavery and Anna Devane who shared a quite volatile history with the Jerome family. Critics began speculating that the character would be the long lost daughter of Tonja Walker's Olivia St. John (born Jerome) despite the relatively small age difference between the actresses; however Matt Webb Motivich of TVLine also suggested that Ava could be a previously unknown child of Olivia's crime lord father, Victor Jerome (Jack Axelrod). The character is immediately thrown into a major storyline as it is revealed that she is helping to hide Morgan and that she is Lauren's mother. According to series head writer, Ron Carlivati, "This is [a] woman who conceived a child with Franco, so you have to worry about that right there." Though Ava initially comes off as a "devoted mother," there is much more behind to her. At the Winter 2014 Television Critics Association press tour, West opened up about portraying Ava and how it compared to portraying Carly on World Turns. She described, "I have to be honest, I work very hard. ... I wanted to create a character that was different. I loved Carly, but I can’t play her again. Then when this part came up, I thought, how am I going to play this role? She’s different. She has similarities as women do.‘How does she carry herself?’ Ava never touches her hair. Ava never moves. Ava’s a snake. She only moves when she is going to strike. And these are things I think about. This is how I wanted to create this person." When asked how she keeps Ava sympathetic and vulnerable, West described, "You never judge your own self. You do what you do — we all do this every day. Ava doesn’t judge herself, she does what she does because she thinks she is right. [...] She is not retrospectively looking at her actions. She is just living in it. As an actor, you can’t judge your character ever. Let others judge it."

=== Relationship with Morgan, affair with Sonny and pregnancy ===
At the Winter 2014 TCA's, West opened up about Ava's relationship with Morgan and where it was headed. She said, "She was worried about the thought that there are other elements that interfere with love. [...] Family interfering with love is as old as love itself. I do think she loves him and her heart is broken." During May 2014 sweeps, Ava cheated on Morgan and had an affair with his father, Sonny. The pair slept together in a crypt. In an interview, West spoke about the events of the affair and its locale. She stated, "A lot of people seemed shocked by it and I was very surprised by that reaction. I was never even thinking about the locale! I was thinking about Ava's pain." West also spoke about her alter-ego's revelation that she was carrying the next Corinthos family baby., stating: That it's a classic soap story that has worked since television began. [...] Nothing bothers me. I'm here to play."

=== Connie Falconeri murder ===
Following the revelation that Ava had in fact murdered Connie Falconeri (Kelly Sullivan), head writer Ron Carlivati opened up to Michael Logan of TV Guide about the revelation, and whether or not he felt he had turned Ava into a cold-blooded killer. Carlivati stated, "Of course, we were nervous! Especially the more we and the audience got invested in Ava. It was always my plan to have her be the killer but there was still the chance that we would change our minds and not write it that way. As the character started growing in popularity, [executive producer] Frank Valentini said, "You know, Connie's killer doesn't have to be Ava. Maybe something else happened. Maybe someone else came in and killed Connie." There was certainly that temptation to protect Ava but, in the end, we decided it was a stronger move to stick with our original idea and see where that could take us down the line: What will happen between Ava and Sonny if and when he finds out she killed Connie? What will he do? She will have nowhere to run!"

=== Cancer ===
In early 2015, Ava (after escaping from prison) is shot by Carlos Rivera (Jeffrey Vincent Parise), as revenge for causing him to be falsely imprisoned, and falls from a bridge. She is presumed dead and a wake in her honor takes place, although in reality she survives. Silas Clay (Michael Easton), who has stashed Ava in a secret hospital room in New York, informs her that she has cancer and is dying, with her condition quickly worsening. After a bone marrow donor cannot be found to save her, Silas agrees to euthanize Ava (per her wishes), on April 16. Soap Opera Digest speculated as to whether or not this was in fact the character's final appearance. Despite General Hospital refusing to comment on West's contract status, Carlivati claimed that this was possibly Ava's "final farewell", explaining that "Basically, we kept writing ourselves into a corner with Ava and then figuring out a way out. We were like, 'Wait a minute, what if she's pregnant,' you know? And then we painted her in this cancer corner and we kind of couldn't figure a way out." Discussing Ava's wishes for Silas to help her die, he said: "Ava wants to die on her own terms, even if it's only a few weeks ahead of what might happen", and clarified that the soap opera was not trying to "come down on either side of [the euthanasia debate]".

== Storylines ==
Luke Spencer (Anthony Geary) tracks down art dealer Ava Jerome at her home in New York City. Luke gets Ava to confess that she was once involved^{1} with the crazed artist Robert "Franco" Frank (Roger Howarth) and that he fathered her daughter, Lauren Katherine "Kiki" Jerome (Kristen Alderson). Ava is shocked to learn from Luke that Franco is an heir to the wealthy and powerful Quartermaine family and that Lauren is entitled to a share of the family fortune. After Luke's visit, it is revealed that Morgan Corinthos (Bryan Craig), the missing son of mob boss, Sonny Corinthos (Maurice Benard) is hiding out in Ava's apartment. Before leaving for work, Ava convinces Morgan to call home. Ava follows her daughter to Port Charles and has an impromptu meeting with Tracy Quartermaine (Jane Elliot) over Kiki's shares, and manages to work out a deal that would endow her with a large money sum. Ava then confronts her daughter about the latest revelations and confesses that her father is in fact alive, leaving Kiki in a state of anger against her mother. Whilst in town, Ava runs Dr. Silas Clay (Michael Easton), with whom she previously had a fling. When Silas begins to question whether or not Kiki is his, Morgan confronts Ava about the truth to which she reveals that Kiki is not Franco's, but in fact is Silas' daughter. When Ava's older brother, the presumed dead Julian Jerome (William deVry) arrives in town under the alias "Derek Wells", the two reveal how their gambling ring involvement with Morgan was all in a hoax to work their way into the Corinthos family crime organization. Ava also confesses to Julian her involvement in the shooting of Olivia Falconeri (Lisa LoCicero). While on a discovery to find out about her birth father, Sam Morgan (Kelly Monaco) and Silas travel to New York and discover that Delia Ryan (Ilene Kristen), who had an affair with Victor, was Ava's birth mother. During a heated confrontation, A. J. Quartermaine (Sean Kanan) confronts Ava about the night that Connie Falconeri (Kelly Sullivan) was murdered; Ava then confesses it was she who murdered Connie, not A. J., due to Connie discovering the truth about "Derek" and Ava's connection. Sonny interrupts and shoots A. J., killing him as a result. During A. J.'s funeral, Ava sleeps with Sonny in the Quartermaine family crypt, and is discovered by Morgan, who breaks their relationship off. To escape town, Sonny sends Ava to his private island to hide out, after Carly finds out the truth about A. J.'s death.

While on the island, Sonny confronts Ava, and confesses he knows the truth about Ava's involvement in the shootings of both Olivia and Connie, and promises to kill her. Ava then confesses that she is pregnant, with either Sonny or Morgan's child, guaranteeing her nine more months of life from Sonny. Following a kidnapping from Nina, Ava gives birth to her daughter, whom Nina abducts and intends to raise as her own. When her daughter is found in Canada, they are briefly reunited when Ava is placed under arrest for Connie's murder. Teaming up with Madeline, Julian and Sonny, she breaks out of prison, only to be shot in the chest by Carlos and believed to be dead when her body is not found after falling into a river. In New York, Silas keeps Ava, whom he rescued and unveils that she is battling cancer. When the cancer spreads at quicker than Silas imagined, Ava requests to be euthanized, choosing to end her life on her own terms. One month after her loved ones believe her to be dead, a doppelgänger by the name of Denise DeMuccio arrives and claims to be inquiring about Ava's family, considering their resemblance. When Denise is arrested and fingerprinted, she is questioned and accused of truly being Ava in disguise, however, when the DNA test performed by Ava's nephew Lucas Jones (Ryan Carnes) comes back proving that Ava and Denise are two different people, she is released from custody. When confronted by Silas, Denise confesses to being Ava and that she teamed up with her mother to pull off the switch in an attempt to be in the lives of her daughters without the threat of the PCPD or Sonny.

In June 2016, while on a plane to England, Ava stumbles upon Nikolas Cassadine (Christopher), who is believed to be dead. While traveling, Ava and Nikolas (under the alias of "Niall Carradine"), run into Huxley Lynch (Trent Dawson), who ultimately entraps them within his home. Believing that Huxley wants Nik (Nick Stabile), they confront him and demand for their release; Huxley admits it is Ava he is truly after, due to her ownership of the "Weeping Naiad". Upon their escape, Nik and Ava make their way to Greece and end up on Cassadine Island, where they are discovered by Jason and Sam Morgan. When confronted to go back to Port Charles and joined by several of Nikolas' family members, Ava and the other guests on Cassadine Island are taken hostage by Valentin Cassadine (James Patrick Stuart). Ava is then held at gun point by Valentin, and in an attempt to save Ava's life, Nikolas is ultimately shot and falls out of a window.

== Reception ==
Jamey Giddens of Daytime Confidential referred to West's potential casting as a "bombshell." TVSource Magazine discussed the storyline potential that could come with West's character if she shared was related to the Jerome family. West debut as Ava was highly anticipated by fans and critics alike. "[i]t was as amazing as we’d hoped" said Omar Nobles of West's May 8 debut. In naming his Top 5 Bad-Ass Women of Summer TV, Luke Kerr of Daytime Confidential listed West and her portrayal of Ava as an honorable mention, citing: "Maura West has been bringing the heat this summer as General Hospital's mad art dealer. She has sizzling chemistry with Michael Easton’s Silas." In the June 10, 2013, issue of ABC Soaps In Depth magazine, editor and chief Richard M. Simms named West and her character were listed as one of the top five enjoyable things about the series at that time. In an online poll for Soap Opera Digest, fans were asked who they believed to be the most enjoyable new additions to the cast. West's portrayal of Ava Jerome was voted the best, winning 42% of the vote with 5,200 votes. Based on her portrayal of Ava Jerome, Michael Logan of TV Guide, called West "the soap sensation of the decade". Highlight Hollywood editor Tommy Lightfoot Garrett called West's acting talents as "definitely one of Hollywood’s top five most talented women today." He went on to call her "lightning in a bottle" and that "she can do anything" proving that "just when you think her talent is contained, she breaks out of that mold, and proves she’s unstoppable."

Giddens further remarked of Ava and her brother Julian, "If loving Ava and Julian is wrong, I don't wanna be right!" West's portrayal of Ava in her relationship with Bryan Craig's Morgan Corinthos was listed on TV Guide's 2013 Hot List under the category of "Hot Bed". Michael Logan writes, "He is a marvelous muddle of puppy awkwardness and testy testosterone. It’s the scandal of Port Charles, but this was no one-night mistake." For her portrayal of Ava, West placed at number thirty-four, down four positions, on Daytime Confidential's Hot 100 list for 2013. West also made Logan's list of "The Best in Soaps 2013", as Best Actress. He praised West saying: "Her performance as high-strung, power-mad mob spawn Ava Jerome is a noirish marvel — deadly, campy and defiantly sexual. There is nothing like a dame." Daytime Confidential also listed West's arrival of Ava and the return of the Jerome crime family as number nine on their "10 Best Soap Opera Storylines of 2013". They said, "When sultry gallery owner Ava Jerome (Maura West) was first introduced, fans and Port Charles citizens alike took notice of her infamous surname." Hollywood Highlight also listed West as one of their top five female performers in 2013. The website praised, "Can anyone be so good, so grand, so sublime with every single man and woman on her talented cast? She can, she is. From beautiful wife, to busy mother, who knows where this woman finds the time to be the best in Daytime TV, but whatever she is doing, we should bottle it and force-feed it to every actress in this town."

Michael Fairman of On-Air On-Soaps named West's debut as Ava Jerome as "Best New Character, Female" as part of his Best and Worst of 2013 list!. "This savvy soap veteran made Ava Jerome must-see soap TV whenever she walked into a room, and delivered her lines with such lethal undertones! We loved it … and Ava’s red-hot fling with the much younger Morgan Corinthos (Bryan Craig)! You go, Ava!," Fairman raved in his year-end review. Daytime Confidential also listed West at number three on their list of 10 Best Female Soap Opera Entertainers of 2013, for her role as Ava Jerome. The site praised West's talent, praising, "Maura West recalled the brassy broads of Old Hollywood as mob queen Ava Jerome on General Hospital in 2013. We didn't think it was possible to love a character played by the actress more than we adored As The World Turns' Carly Snyder, but boy-oh-boy were we wrong!" Head writer Ron Carlivati also praised West's portrayal of Ava, praising, "Now to see what she has brought to the character of Ava, it has just been amazing. It is so different than the character she played before, and what that shows me is … she can pretty much do anything." Boston Herald praised West's performance, exclaiming, "Springfield native Maura West is mesmerizing as 'General Hospital’s' scheming Ava Jerome, sultry, sexy, vulnerable, vindictive — sometimes in the same scene. To think, this was only supposed to be a five-episode gig. If West hosted a pay-per-view in which she read the zip codes for the United States, she might make a fortune."

In early 2014, West received a pre-nomination for the Daytime Emmy Award for Outstanding Lead Actress in a Drama Series, her sixth potential nomination in the category. West was previously nominated five times in previous years, for her portrayal of Carly Tenney Snyder, winning twice; this is her first potential nomination in the role of Ava Jerome. West was listed at number one on Daytime Confidential's "Top 10 Female Soap Opera Entertainers of 2014" list. They called West "10 percent present" and cited "West fought to keep her character relevant amid a slew of new storylines and larger-than-life characters." In 2015, West received a pre-nomination for the 42nd Daytime Emmy Awards in the category of Lead Actress for her portrayal of Ava, her sixth over-all potential nomination in the category, and her second for the role of Ava. West was officially nominated in the category of Lead Actress on March 31, her first for her portrayal of Ava Jerome.

As part of his year-end "Best and Worst in Soaps" article for 2015, Michael Fairman praised West's work during the Denise DeMuccio storyline, praising that West "played it to the hilt", however, named the black wig West wore during the storyline as the "Worst Prop". Daytime Confidential also listed the relationship of Denise and Morgan as their number one "Worst Soap Couples of 2015". They called the pairing "the kind of crap that gets soaps made fun of on late night television." On January 27, 2016, West earned a pre-nomination in the category of Outstanding Lead Actress in a Drama Series for the 43rd Daytime Emmy Awards. In July 2017, Kambra Clifford of Soapcentral.com listed the introduction and self-proclaimed "reign" of Ava Jerome as one of Carlivati's five best soap opera storylines, citing the arrival of Ava Jerome as Carlvati's "cake topping female villain moment". Clifford further stated that Ava's arrival "forever changed the face" of General Hospital and classified the character as one of the best in the soap's long history". Fairman, as part of his Best and Worst in Soaps column for 2017, named West in the category of "Best Overall Performance by an Actress". He described her performances as "gut-wrenching," "stellar" and "pure gold." In March 2018, West received her third nomination in the Lead Actress in a Drama Series category for her portrayal of Ava.

West's performance was again praised for her work during the November 30, 2018, episode, in which Ava is made known of Kiki's murder. Fairman noted that it "set the stage for Maura West to bring to the audience a knockout performance that would be remembered for some time to come." For her performance, she earned Michael Fairman TV's Power Performance of the Week. Canyon News' editor Donald also praised West's work, calling it "flawless" and "riveting," while also crediting her performance for making General Hospital "can’t miss TV right now." Digital Journal editor Markos Papadatos called West's performance "too huge to ignore." Fairman co-named West as "Best Overall Performance by an Actress" for his "Best and Worst" of 2018 list, alongside Marci Miller. On March 20, 2019, West earned a nomination in the category of Outstanding Lead Actress. In May 2020, she earned her fifth nomination for Ava in the Outstanding Lead Actress category.

In March 2023, Soaps.com editor Charlie Mason placed Ava at number six on his list of "General Hospital's 40+ Greatest Characters of All Time," commenting: "A tragic victim of circumstance, a stone-cold femme fatale or a little bit of both? With Maura West's master manipulator, you can never be sure — but you'll definitely tune in tomorrow (and the next day!) to see if you can figure out the vexing vixen!" In December 2024, as part of their year-end listings, Soap Opera Network named West (for her work as Ava) as their seventh-top female performer.
