= William deVry =

Canadian television actor

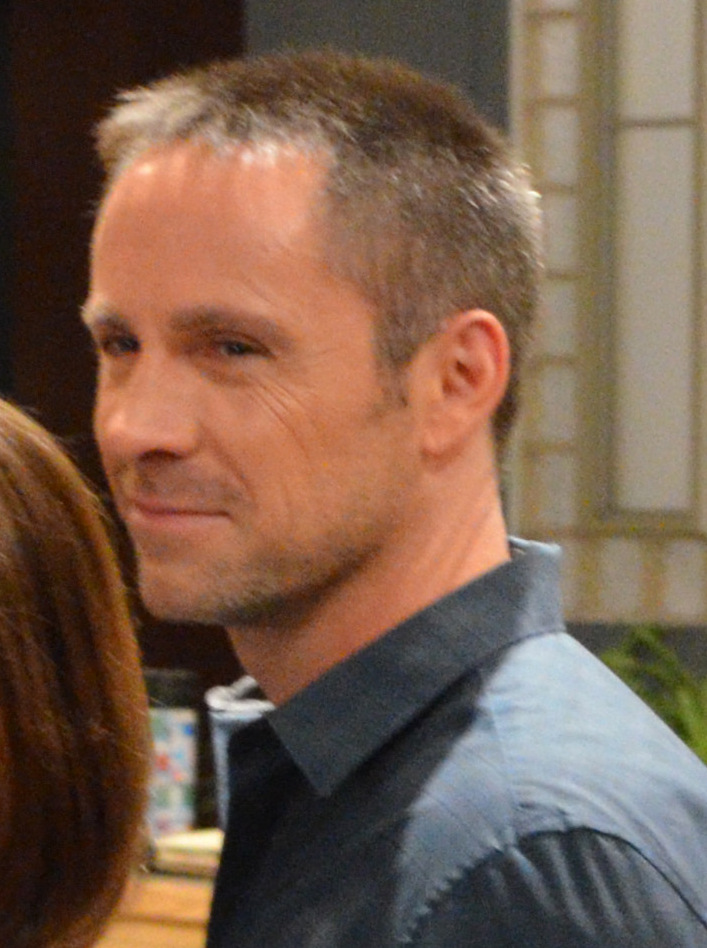
- DeVry in 2014
- Born: William deVry Simard; 20 April 1968 (age 58); Montreal, Quebec, Canada
- Other names: William Vry; William Simard
- Occupation: Actor
- Years active: 1994–present

William deVry (born 20 April 1968) is a Canadian film, television theatre, and voice actor. He is best known for his roles in American daytime soap operas, as Tim Dolan on Port Charles, as Michael Cambias on All My Children, as Storm Logan on The Bold and the Beautiful, and as Julian Jerome on General Hospital. He is also known for roles in the Earth: Final Conflict, Stargate SG-1, InSecurity, and Nikita.

== Early life ==
His birth name is William deVry Simard. He moved to Florida with his mother at the age of 19. His grandfather, Herman A. DeVry, founded the DeForest Training School, (now DeVry University), named after Lee De Forest, Herman's colleague and friend. DeVry comes from a long lineage of athletes and entrepreneurs. His father lettered in several sports in college and his maternal grandmother held 26 world records in track and field.

== Career ==
DeVry appeared in a number of Canadian television series of the 1990s, including recurring roles on Earth: Final Conflict, as Joshua Doors, and on Stargate SG-1, as Aldwin. In 2002, he began his career on American daytime soap operas. His first soap role was on ABC's Port Charles in 2002. He later joined the cast of All My Children, as Michael Cambias, and in 2004 was nominated for a Daytime Emmy Award for Outstanding Supporting Actor in a Drama Series. From 2006 to 2008, he starred on The Bold and the Beautiful as Storm Logan.

DeVry starred in the Canadian comedy series InSecurity in 2011. He had a recurring roles on CW's Nikita and Beauty and the Beast, Netflix's Hemlock Grove, and guest-starred on Castle and NCIS.

In 2013, deVry joined the ABC soap opera General Hospital. Using the alias Derek Wells, deVry is introduced as a media mogul and new boss to Kelly Sullivan's Connie Falconeri. It's later revealed that Derek is in fact mob boss Julian Jerome. DeVry has been involved in a central storyline since his debut and is also well connected to other characters with the reveal that Julian is the father of Sam Morgan (Kelly Monaco) and Lucas Jones (Ryan Carnes), one-time lover of Alexis Davis (Nancy Lee Grahn) and brother of Ava Jerome (Maura West). deVry made his on-screen debut on 30 July. In November 2020, he announced his departure from the role.

== Personal life ==
Since 2007, DeVry has been in a relationship with Hallmark TV movie actress Rebecca Staab.

== Filmography ==
=== Film ===
Year	Title	Role	Notes
1995	Once in a Blue Moon	Eric / Adult Peter	
2002	Liebe auf den 2. Blick	Nick	Direct-to-video
2012	In Return	Bill	
2014	The Outsider	Nick Miller	
2018	Surviving Theater 9	Dwayne	Short film

=== Television ===
Year	Title	Role	Notes
1994	seaQuest DSV	Matthew	"Daggers"
1996	The Sentinel	Master Sergeant	"The Switchman"
1996	The Outer Limits	Bartender	"Inconstant Moon"
1996	Poltergeist: The Legacy	Kevin Sumner	"Do Not Go Gently"
1997	Viper	Geoffrey Vollis	"Echo of Murder"
1997	Dead Man's Gun	Zane Forbes	"Fortune Teller"
1997	Convictions	Shane	TV film
1997–1998	The Outer Limits	Ben	"Double Helix", "The Origin of Species"
1998	I Know What You Did	Jeffrey Davenport	TV film
1998	The Long Way Home	Adam	TV film
1998	Nash Bridges	Brian Hammond	"Special Delivery"
1998–2000	Earth: Final Conflict	Joshua Doors	Recurring role
1999	The Lost World	Ned Malone	TV film
1999	Nothing Too Good for a Cowboy	Leo Porter	"Charades", "Sex Lies and Narrow Escapes"
1999	Cold Squad	Dr. Anthony Hart	"Gavin MacInnis"
1999	First Wave	Karl	"The Decision", "The Purge"
1999–2002	Stargate SG-1	Aldwin	Recurring role
2000	Secret Agent Man	Hicks	"Like Father, Like Son"
2000	The Outer Limits	Craig Swenson	"Breaking Point"
2000–2001	Beggars and Choosers	Brent Kallus	Recurring role
2001	So Weird	State Trooper	"The Great Incanto"
2001	Dream Storm	Jordan Ingram	TV film
2002	Port Charles	Tim Dolan	
2002	Dead in a Heartbeat	John	TV film
2002	The Twilight Zone	Nick Janus	"Dead Man's Eyes"
2002	Wildfire 7: The Inferno	Scott	TV film
2003–2004	All My Children	Michael Cambias	Regular role
2006	Double Cross	Dean Swanson	TV film
2006	Godiva's	Garth Rutlidge	Recurring role
2006–2008, 2012	The Bold and the Beautiful	Stephen "Storm" Logan	Regular role
2011	R. L. Stine's The Haunting Hour: The Series	Dad	"The Perfect Brother"
2011	Three Weeks, Three Kids	Brian Norton	TV film
2011	InSecurity	Peter McNeil	Main role
2011–2012	Nikita	Patrick Miller	Recurring role
2012	A Killer Among Us	Officer Drake	TV film
2013	Transporter: The Series	Ryder	"Give the Guy a Hand"
2013	Beauty and the Beast	Handsome Man / Dr. Sorenson	Recurring role
2013	Castle	Dan Renner	"The Lives of Others"
2013	Hemlock Grove	Chin	Recurring role
2013–2020	General Hospital	Julian Jerome	Regular role
2014	NCIS	Lt. Comm. D. Stone	"Kill Chain"
2014	Cedar Cove	Dick Turnbull	"Stand and Deliver", "Resolutions and Revelations"
2022	NCIS: Los Angeles	Navy Captain Lombardo	Episode: "Murmuration"
2023	Christmas at the Chalet	Eric Tremblay	Hallmark film

== Awards and nominations ==
List of acting awards and nominations
Year	Award	Category	Title	Result	Ref.
2004	Daytime Emmy Award	Outstanding Supporting Actor in a Drama Series	All My Children	Nominated	
