= Gloria Monty =

American television producer (1921–2006)

- Born: Gloria Montemuro; August 12, 1921; Allenhurst, New Jersey, U.S.
- Died: March 30, 2006 (aged 84); Rancho Mirage, California, U.S.
- Resting place: Saint Catharine's Cemetery, Sea Girt, New Jersey
- Education: University of Iowa; New York University; Columbia University
- Occupation: Television producer
- Years active: 1950–2002
- Spouse: Robert O'Byrne (1952–1991, his death)

Gloria Monty (August 12, 1921 – March 30, 2006) was an American television producer working primarily in the field of daytime drama.

== Education ==
Born Gloria Montemuro in Allenhurst, New Jersey and raised in the West Allenhurst neighborhood of Ocean Township, Monmouth County, New Jersey, she attended the University of Iowa, New York University, and Columbia University, where she earned her master's degree in drama.

== Theatre work ==
In 1952, she married writer and editor Robert O'Byrne, with whom she had founded a New York theater group, Abbe Theater School. With O'Byrne, Monty directed summer stock productions and led acting and speech workshops at The New School in New York City, where her pupils included Marlon Brando, Demi Moore and Tony Curtis.

== TV career ==
After directing shows such as The First Hundred Years, The Secret Storm (for many years), and Bright Promise, she is best known for taking over the ailing ABC Daytime serial General Hospital in 1978 as Executive Producer. Fred Silverman, the head of ABC, gave Monty thirteen weeks to turn the show around, with cancellation threatened if she did not succeed. It subsequently became the top-rated American daytime drama and won several Daytime Emmy Awards.

To accomplish this turnaround, she increased the show's pace, and focused main storylines on younger characters to reach out to younger viewers, particularly the pairing of ingenue Laura Spencer (Genie Francis) and troubled criminal Luke Spencer (Anthony Geary, whom she knew from his stint on her previous series, Bright Promise). She gave the sets a more contemporary look and feel, and employed production techniques once used only in primetime. One major result of the "Monty Revolution" was the faster pace of the show, effectively doubling the number of scenes in each episode. She was known for her rigid work ethic and for being tough with the cast and crew. “She demand[ed] excellence, but she reward[ed] it,” said coordinating producer Jerry Balme.

Monty was accused of perpetuating dangerous misconceptions about rape, implicitly exalting violence against women. But Monty viewed the “rape” as a choreographed "seduction.” Under her tenure, General Hospital rose to the top spot in the ratings, with Luke and Laura's 1981 wedding being the highest rated episode in daytime history (about 30 million viewers in 13 million households). Monty's Revolution consisted of couples such as Luke/Laura, Frisco/Felicia, and Robert/Holly. She and various head writers also created the Quartermaine family, Bobbie Spencer, Luke Spencer, Lucy Coe, Robert Scorpio, Anna Devane, Robin Scorpio, the Cassadine family, and many other popular characters who would dominate the show in the 1980s and early 1990s.

General Hospital received cover stories in both People, Soap Opera Weekly, and Newsweek, which referred to Luke and Laura as the “Rhett Butler and Scarlett O'Hara of Soapland”. Included in the show's fan base were celebrities Elizabeth Taylor and Sammy Davis Jr., both of whom guest starred on the series. She was also the executive producer of the primetime serial The Hamptons. She employed many former daytime performers for this show. Monty announced her departure from General Hospital in 1986, working on her final episode as executive producer in January 1987. Her next two successors, H. Wesley Kenney (1987–1989) and Joseph Hardy (1989–1991), were both lauded by viewers, but GH fell out of first place in 1988 (with the ratings top spot being taken over by The Young and the Restless, the show that Kenney was hired from). By 1990, the show's ratings were starting to sag significantly. That December, ABC's daytime programming head Jackie Smith successfully hired Monty back as GH's executive producer, and Monty resumed her role on February 13, 1991.

In early 1991, Monty lured Anthony Geary back to daytime, but not as the popular Luke Spencer. Instead, Monty went along with Geary's demand to play a brand new character, Bill Eckert, Luke's lookalike cousin. An entire new family, the blue-collar Eckerts, was ushered in, and quickly dominated storyline, while the longrunning Quartermaine family was phased out. Monty also fired a dozen actors, in what the press described as a "bloodbath", including actress Jennifer Guthrie, who played heroine Dawn Winthrop. After Monty appointed her sister, Norma Monty, as head writer, the ratings eroded further.

Monty's dismissal became inevitable between the declining ratings and the departure of popular cast members such as Tristan Rogers (Robert Scorpio) and Finola Hughes (Anna Devane, who Monty fired among much criticism). In early 1992, after only a year, Monty was replaced with Wendy Riche. She produced several made-for-television movies based on her friend Mary Higgins Clark's novels. She also chaired the New Jersey Motion Picture & Television Commission.

== Honors ==
In 1997, a Golden Palm Star on the Palm Springs, California, Walk of Stars was dedicated to Monty.

== Death ==
She and her sister moved to Rumson, New Jersey, in 1994. Monty died on March 30, 2006, at Rancho Mirage, California, from cancer, aged 84. She was buried at Saint Catharine's Cemetery, Sea Girt, New Jersey.

Preceded by Tom Donovan	Executive producer of General Hospital; January 16, 1978–January 16, 1987	Succeeded by H. Wesley Kenney
Preceded by Joseph Hardy	Executive producer of General Hospital; February 13, 1991–January 24, 1992	Succeeded by Wendy Riche
