= H. Wesley Kenney =

American television producer and director

- Born: Harold Wesley Kenney Jr. January 3, 1926; Dayton, Ohio
- Died: January 13, 2015 (aged 89); Santa Monica, California
- Other name: Wes Kenney
- Occupations: Television producer, director
- Years active: 1952–2000s
- Spouse: Heather North (m. 1971)

Harold Wesley Kenney Jr. (January 3, 1926 – January 13, 2015) was an American television producer and director whose career extended from the medium's formative years in the early 1950s, into the 2000s, and included thousands of episodes, both primetime and daytime, as well as five Emmy wins and eight nominations. He was frequently billed as Wes Kenney.

== Early years ==
Shortly after graduating from Carnegie Mellon University's College of Engineering in 1951, Kenney was hired by the DuMont Television Network. According to the 2004 book The Forgotten Network: DuMont and the Birth of American Television, Kenney directed up to twelve different broadcasts each day during his career at the network and its flagship station WABD. This was because most of DuMont's programs were broadcast live, and were often done on small budgets. From 1950 to 1954 he directed many episodes of Rocky King Detective. Kenney continued to direct many programs after DuMont's dissolution in 1956.

== Daytime dramas ==
He is best known for his work on soap operas. In the early 1960s, he worked on the controversial Special for Women. He produced and directed Days of Our Lives from 1968 to 1979, and then became Co-Executive Producer of The Young and the Restless from 1982 to 1987. Under Kenney's run as Y&R's Co-Executive Producer, he helped the show win three Daytime Emmys for Outstanding Drama Series in 1983, 1985, and 1986. From 1987 to 1989, Kenney replaced the legendary Gloria Monty as Executive Producer of General Hospital. He became General Hospital's Head Writer during the 1988 WGA strike.

Kenney's directing credits include All in the Family, Big John, Little John, Inside Detective, and Flo.

== Personal life ==
He married actress Heather North in 1971, after meeting her on the set of Days of Our Lives, where she was playing the part of Sandy Horton.

After Kenney retired from directing, he was a professor at the UCLA School of Theater, Film and Television. He died of cardiac arrest at Saint John's Health Center on January 13, 2015, just 10 days after his 89th birthday.

== Selected filmography ==
- Filthy Rich (1982) TV series
- Big John, Little John (1976) TV series
- Far Out Space Nuts (1975) TV series
- All in the Family TV series (6 episodes, 1974–1975)
- Distant Early Warning (1975) (TV Movie)
- Murder in the First Person Singular (1974) (TV Movie)
- Days of Our Lives (1965) TV series
- My Favorite Martian TV series (2 episodes, 1965)
- Your First Impression (1962) TV series
- Rocky King, Inside Detective (The Forgotten Network says he directed most of the episodes produced during its 1950–1954 run)

== Sources ==
- Weinstein, D. (2004). The Forgotten Network: DuMont and the Birth of American Television. Philadelphia: Temple University Press. ISBN 1-59213-499-8

Preceded by Ann Marcus; Norma Monty	Head writer of General Hospital (during the 1988 WGA strike); April 25, 1988-August 26, 1988	Succeeded by Gene Palumbo
Preceded by Betty Corday	Executive producer of Days of Our Lives (with Betty Corday); April 20, 1977–January 18, 1980	Succeeded by Betty Corday; Al Rabin
Preceded by William J. Bell; John Conboy	Executive producer of The Young and the Restless (with William J. Bell); January 4, 1982–December 11, 1986	Succeeded by William J. Bell; Edward J. Scott
Preceded by Gloria Monty	Executive producer of General Hospital; January 19, 1987–November 30, 1989	Succeeded by Joseph Hardy
