= Helena Cassadine =

Fictional character from General Hospital

- General Hospital character
- Constance Towers as Helena Cassadine
- Portrayed by: Elizabeth Taylor (1981); Dimitra Arliss (1996); Constance Towers (1997–2023)
- Duration: 1981; 1996–2007; 2009–2017; 2019–2020; 2022–2023
- First appearance: November 16, 1981
- Last appearance: May 4, 2023
- Created by: Gloria Monty; Thom Racina
- Introduced by: Gloria Monty (1981); Wendy Riche (1996); Jill Farren Phelps (2009); Frank Valentini (2019)
- Book appearances: The Secret Life of Damian Spinelli
In-universe information
- Other names: Helena Romanov; Helena Anhalt Cassadine
- Occupation: Socialite; Terrorist
- Family: Cassadine
- Parents: Basil Romanov; Agatha Romanov
- Spouse: Mikkos Cassadine (195?–1981)
- Sons: Stavros Cassadine; Stefan Cassadine; Valentin Cassadine
- Daughters: Irina Cassadine
- Stepdaughters: Alexis Davis; Kristina Cassadine
- Grandsons: Nikolas Cassadine
- Granddaughters: Charlotte Cassadine
- Other relatives: Spencer Cassadine; Ace Cassadine; Sam Morgan; Kristina Davis; Molly Lansing; Danny Morgan

Helena Cassadine is a fictional character who is the main antagonist of the American soap opera General Hospital, famously originated by film actress Elizabeth Taylor in November 1981. After a brief stint by Dimitra Arliss in 1996, Constance Towers took over the role in 1997 and has returned — for periods of varying length — nearly every year since.

== Casting ==
The role was originated by Elizabeth Taylor when she guest-starred on the series. Taylor, who was a fan of the series, agreed to the role so she could appear at Luke and Laura's wedding.

A fan of the series and wildly popular supercouple Luke Spencer and Laura Webber (Anthony Geary and Genie Francis), Taylor called then-Executive Producer Gloria Monty in 1981 and asked for a featured role. She was cast as Helena, the vengeful widow of villain Mikkos Cassadine (John Colicos), who had died at the climax of that summer's popular "Ice Princess" storyline. Arriving on the canvas on November 10, 1981, Mrs. Mikkos Cassadine sends her Emissary to all the prominent citizens of PC with invitations to attend a reception she is giving. Luke and Laura's November 16, 1981, wedding, featuring Taylor's Helena, was watched by 30 million viewers and remains the highest-rated hour in American soap opera history. Taylor's last appearance as Helena aired on November 19, 1981. Though gone, the character was mentioned several times in her absence until Dimitra Arliss appeared briefly as the character on July 25 and 26, 1996, and Constance Towers was later introduced as Helena on December 19, 1997. Towers was a regular presence on the series until April 9, 2002, later returning on October 16 and 17, 2003, in December 2003, and from January 16 to October 2004. Towers' Helena reappeared in January 2005, April to May 2005, October to November 2005, January 2006, May 26, 2006, and from October 2006 to January 2007. Towers returned from April 13 to April 21, 2009, on June 4, 2009., September 30 to October 20, 2009; February 10 to August 6, 2010; June 30 to September 29, 2011 and once again from January 11 to February 29, 2012. On October 31, 2012, it was announced that Towers would once again return to the canvas in November. She first aired on November 30 and ended her limited run on December 3, 2012. On March 2, 2013, Highlight Hollywood reported that Towers had returned to the set to begin work on a new storyline in honor of the show's 50th anniversary. Towers returned on March 29 and left on April 3 when Helena was presumed dead. Towers later returned to the role from September 17, 2014 to February 20, 2015 and again on July 9, 2015. Although Helena allegedly died on camera of natural causes in November 2015, Towers would return on several occasions in 2016, first for a videotaped will reading, then as part of several characters' nightmares. In May 2017, Soap Opera Digest announced that Towers would once again reprise the role of Helena. In 2019, it was announced that Towers would reprise the role for a brief guest appearance, which began on August 19 and ended on August 21. In February 2020, it was announced that Towers would again make another appearance for the sweeps period. In October of the same year, Towers briefly reprised the role of Helena. She then reprised the role in January 2022 for the funeral of Luke.

On March 31, 2023, it was announced Towers would again reprise the role for two episodes in May, according to a post on Towers' Facebook page. She appeared from May 3–4, 2023.

== Storylines ==
=== 1980s ===
In the summer of 1981, Luke, Laura, and Robert Scorpio foil Mikkos Cassadine's plot to freeze the world using a weather machine, and both Mikkos and his brother Tony are killed while their other brother Victor is arrested. Mikkos's widow Helena appears in Port Charles just in time to curse Luke and Laura from the sidelines of their November 16, 1981 wedding. Laura later vanishes without a trace in 1982, leaving a devastated Luke to search for her. Presumed dead, Laura reappears in 1983, having been kidnapped by the Cassadines in revenge. Told that Luke was dead, Laura had been forced to marry Mikkos and Helena's son Stavros Cassadine, who had fallen in love with her. She had returned to Port Charles upon learning that Luke was alive, followed by Stavros; he is ultimately killed, and Luke and Laura are reunited. Discovering that Laura is pregnant with their first child, she and Luke leave town in 1984.

=== 1990s ===
Having returned to Port Charles in 1993 with son Lucky, Luke and Laura have a daughter they call Lulu in 1994. In 1996 she is diagnosed with aplastic anemia. A mysterious young man comes to town hoping to help. Laura is forced to reveal that he is Nikolas Cassadine, her son with Stavros, born during her captivity. She had been sworn by the Cassadines to leave him behind and keep his existence a secret as a condition of her release, to protect Luke from their wrath. Nikolas saves Lulu's life with a bone marrow transplant, but Luke and Laura's marriage is destroyed by the revelation of this secret. Around this time, Luke visits a bedridden Helena, gloating at her condition but vowing to have his revenge when she is well enough to fully experience him murdering her. Nikolas had come to town with his calculating but benevolent uncle and guardian Stefan Cassadine (Mikkos and Helena's younger son) and Stefan's adopted cousin Alexis Davis. Stefan and Laura had been romantically involved while she had been married to Stavros and confined on Cassadine Island. Stefan still harbors feelings for her. With Laura's marriage to Luke faltering, her own feelings for Stefan are rekindled as he comforts her. With Helena no longer a threat, Stefan discovers one of her secrets: Laura's mother Lesley is alive, having been kidnapped by Helena in 1984 and her death faked. Stefan frees Lesley and reunites her with Laura.

Helena appears in 1997 in an attempt to reassert control over Cassadine heir Nikolas and his fortune. She loathes Stefan, whom she views as weak, and seeks to thwart his influence over Nikolas by distracting Stefan with Laura. Meanwhile, Alexis had discovered she was actually Mikkos' illegitimate daughter. Helena terrorizes her. Alexis remembers - as a little girl she had watched Helena slit her mother's throat. Luke and Alexis plot to kill Helena in 1998, but Stefan's fiancée Katherine Bell is accidentally killed instead. They attempt to frame Helena, but Stefan is arrested; Katherine is revealed to be alive, saved by Helena as part of her plans. In Helena's debt, Katherine seduces Nikolas to put a wedge between him and Stefan. Meanwhile, Luke discovers evidence Nikolas is actually Stefan's son, making him no longer the Cassadine heir and allowing Helena to take control of the Cassadine fortune. She next plans to eliminate Stefan and Laura, but Stefan manages to poison Helena, rendering her paralyzed and mute. Katherine is murdered for real. Laura is charged; it is ultimately revealed an antidote had allowed Helena to recover. She had crept out of her bed to kill Katherine and frame Laura. Later it is also discovered Helena had faked the DNA results. Nikolas is Stavros' son and the rightful heir.

=== 2000s ===
Lucky is presumed dead in a fire in May 1999; he reappears in February 2000 having been kidnapped on Helena's orders and brainwashed into serving her. In 2001, it is revealed Stavros has been in cryonic suspension in a secret room below General Hospital since his apparent "death" in 1983, waiting for a time when medical science could revive him. Helena manages to do so. Stefan stirs up trouble in town. Though initially compelled to do Helena's bidding and even hurting his loved ones, Lucky finally manages to break Helena's conditioning. Luke kills Stavros again by pushing him into a bottomless pit in 2001.

In 2006 Helena placed a nanny in Nikolas' home, Colleen McHenry, in hopes of getting Nikolas' son Spencer. For a while, everything was going according to plan, until Colleen turned on Helena with her own agenda. She had fallen for Nikolas. When her feelings weren't returned because Nikolas and Emily had gotten back together, she lost it. Colleen overpowered Helena and held her captive in a tower near Wyndemere for a couple days. She then kidnapped baby Spencer on Christmas Eve. Nikolas and Emily searched for them and tracked Colleen to Chicago where she had dyed her hair and gotten a job at a daycare center to save enough and start a new life with "her son". After a few near-misses with Nikolas and Emily, Helena encountered the psycho nanny and took Spencer to St. Petersburg, Russia. Nik & Em followed her and got there just in time to stop Helena from baptizing Spencer with a different name. When they tried to get him back, Helena threatened to kill him with a dagger. Emily offered to trade herself for the infant. Helena accepted. Emily was able to get away, as was Helena.

Helena reappears in Port Charles at the General Hospital grand re-opening on April 13, 2009 demanding Nikolas return a painting of Saint Gregoire to her, which he does. Alexis voices her suspicions. Helena has actually orchestrated the recent arrival of Rebecca Shaw, who resembles Nikolas's deceased wife Emily Quartermaine; Nikolas is inclined to agree when he later sees Helena and Rebecca talking. As Helena leaves town on her jet, she tears the paper off the backside of the painting and reveals a birth certificate. She returns again on June 4, 2009 and soon tries to lure Rebecca away from her "current partner" and assist in Helena's plans; Rebecca angrily refuses. After their conversation, Helena disappears.

On September 30, 2009, Helena returns, but she is sick and confined to her bed. Luke comes in and talks to her. Helena tells him another Cassadine is plotting revenge on the Spencers and Cassadines. Luke thinks Helena is faking her illness but he feels her forehead. It is revealed she is not faking her illness. Her nurse Mischa tells Luke's kids Ethan and Lulu there is another Cassadine, named Valentin, whom even Helena fears. Fearing for her life, Nikolas has Helena flown to General Hospital. After stirring up even more trouble after arriving in Port Charles, Nikolas uses his position in the hospital's board of directors to have Helena sent back to Greece.

=== 2010s ===
Helena showed up in Port Charles again on February 10, following her learning of Nikolas' affair with Elizabeth Webber. The following day, Elizabeth finds out she is pregnant. Believing the baby is Nikolas's, Helena made immediate threats to Elizabeth about the welfare of the child. Believing she is unstable, Nikolas and Lucky pressure her into committing herself into Shadybrook Sanitarium. In an attempt to keep tabs on Elizabeth, Helena makes a large donation to the institution, getting an upper hand with the staff. While reminiscing with Luke, she reveals the immediate threat from Valentin has passed. Later, when Elizabeth has a paternity test done, Helena pays the lab tech to let her see the results first. She finds out Lucky is the biological father, but has the results switched to make it look like Nikolas is the father. Helena has her Man kidnap Tracy who she thought knew Liz's baby was a Spencer. Luke tries to find Tracy but ends up kidnapped, too. While they are being held hostage, Tracy becomes sick and Luke takes care of her. Later Nikolas and Lucky find Tracy and Luke. Upon returning to Port Charles, Nikolas banishes Helena from Wyndemere for her actions and warns her to stay away from Elizabeth and their son. When the newborn Aiden is later kidnapped, Helena instantly becomes a suspect, and Nik openly threatens to kill her if she is the one who did so. Eventually, Aiden is found unharmed.

Over time, Elizabeth suspects that Aiden is Lucky's son, not Nikolas', and confirms this with a third DNA test. After delaying this revelation when Elizabeth's middle child Jake is killed in a hit-and run accident, she finally reveals the truth to Lucky and Nikolas. Nikolas does not take the news well, and decides to leave Aiden with Elizabeth and Lucky, then prepares to leave town. Helena is seen in Port Charles secretly watching Nikolas as he boards his jet. Shortly afterward, she confronts Lucky to taunt him, while insisting the whole time that Aiden was really a Cassadine and that Elizabeth's third DNA test was the tampered one. Lucky demands her to leave.

While searching from a recently missing-in-action Luke in Florida, Lulu and her boyfriend Dante learn from a pimp that Luke is somewhere doing business with Helena. The two arrive on Cassadine Island where they confront Helena about Luke's whereabouts. Helena later threatens to cause the Spencer family pain by making them lose Luke. Helena has a plan to get revenge on Spencers for the deaths of both her sons.

On September 28, 2011, Luke's son, Ethan, is wandering in Nik's home. While there, he finds a photo of Laura and is smacked in the head with vase by Helena. Helena sees someone passing by while she and Ethan talk.

On January 11, 2012, Helena is seen lurking the tunnels of Wyndemere holding a dagger and listening in on Ethan and "Cassandra's" conversation. Helena reappears on February 24, 2012 when she shows her face to Ethan and "Cassandra". She insists it's time to end the charade and tell Ethan the truth. Ethan's shocked when he realizes that Helena and "Cassandra" know each other. It hits him even harder, when "Cassandra" announces under the pressure of Helena that she really is Irina Cassadine, Helena's daughter. Irina tells Ethan that she was forced to play the part and take a place in Helena's never ending vendetta against Laura and the Spencer family. Helena seeks her goal when she informs Ethan that she wanted him to fall for Irina in order to break his heart. Irina tries to convince Ethan that she's fallen in love with him and doesn't want to lose him. Helena claims that Irina is still playing him and then she lets two of her men bring in a beaten up Luke. Ethan is shocked to learn that Luke was captured by Helena all this time since he thought his father was on one of his adventurous trips. Helena then announces that one of them is going to die. She ends up shooting her daughter, killing her.

On November 30, 2012, Helena is seen once again as Robert Scorpio pays her a visit. After she is told of Robert's suspicion that Cesar Faison is still alive, Helena calls Faison once Robert leaves to warn him that Robert is on to him.

On March 29, 2013, Helena reappears when she is suspected of kidnapping Lulu and shooting her grandson Nikolas. Luke and Laura learn that Helena stole the Haunted Star and they go to the boat with Dante to find Lulu. Helena's men hold Luke and Laura at gun point when Laura accuses Helena of shooting Nikolas. Helena refuses to believe Nikolas has been shot, but confirms it after calling to the hospital, and insists she was not responsible. Dante then shows up to save Luke and Laura and while Dante stays with Helena, the two of them go to a room where they believe Lulu is being held. Instead they find Ethan, who was caught while Helena was looking for Lucky. Helena reappears with her men as Luke, Laura, and Ethan, are out on deck, having apparently gotten free from Dante. Helena gives Laura a gun and offers to give them Lulu if Laura shoots Ethan, but then offers for her to shoot Luke instead. Luke and Laura use their apparent compliance as an opportunity to turn the gun on Helena's men. Luke then shoots Helena and confirms that she is dead. However, later on, it is revealed that Helena's body was frozen.

Helena is revealed to be alive, thanks to Robin's miracle formula. Helena has in her possession the frozen embryo of Stavros and Lulu. She also reveals that she has big plans for both Jason Morgan and Robin, but only that Jason (actually Jason's long-lost twin brother Drew Cain) made his way to the residence of Sonny Corinthos. When Luke begins acting rather strangely, it appears that somebody has taken over his identity and that he is in cahoots with Helena, but eventually, he is revealed to indeed be Luke suffering from D.I.D. Luke and Helena prove to be a dangerous pair and in one of her most nefarious acts, Helena along with Luke plans to blow up the Cassadine yacht with many Port Charles residents aboard. Their plan fails, and Luke is put into a mental hospital while Nikolas bans Helena to banishment in the Cassadine compound once again, this time apparently for good. Several months go by, and after Luke discovers the reasons for his D.I.D. learns that his son, Ethan, has been kidnapped. Luke confronts Helena but she appears to be a shell of herself, admitting defeat for the first time and warning him that Nikolas has all the power now. In a sense, she seems pleased with this, her plans for him finally achieved. Helena's farewell gift to Luke is a shocker: his grandson, Jake, whom Luke had believed he had killed several years before. Luke is stunned when Helena gives Luke a goodbye kiss, certain that they will never cross paths again.

By late November 2015, "Jason" has learned his true identity and clues take him, Samantha and Elizabeth to the Cassadine compound where Helena appears to be dying. Nikolas is present in an apparent last visit with his hated grandmother and is doting on the dying woman. Confronted by threats from Samantha, Helena gives her a taste of the Cassadine curse after Samantha insists that Mikkos loved Alexis's mother, not her. As Helena prepares to tell Jason the truth about his identity, she slips into unconsciousness and her doctor indicates that Helena is dead (once again). Efforts by Elizabeth to revive her to reveal what she knows proves futile and the three leave. Nikolas admits to his dead grandmother that for as much as he hated her, he also admired her for her class and determination to keep the family strong. The following February after a man who was much like her instincts at the All Saints Church who held everybody hostage, various Port Charles residents showed up except Sonny for the filmed reading of Helena's will where she continued her game playing from beyond the grave, sending Laura on a wild goose chase in regards to an empty book and giving Alexis the knife with which she slit her mother's throat. Helena continued to appear to various characters in their nightmares including Sonny's, harassing them in regards to the curse she had put on them at the time of her death because the district attorney was Paul Hornsby.

== Reception ==
In 2024, Charlie Mason from Soaps She Knows included Helena in his list of the worst mothers in American soap operas, explaining, "As if it wasn't bad enough that Mommie Dearest played favorites with her kids — fawning over the vile Stavros — she tried to murder his brother Stefan and ordered the execution of their sister Irena!"
