= Night Football =

Night Football may refer to:

- Sunday Night Football (disambiguation)
- Monday Night Football (disambiguation)
- Thursday Night Football, National Football League (NFL) games that broadcast primarily on Thursday nights
- Friday Night Football (disambiguation)
- Saturday Night Football (disambiguation)

== See also ==
- Football Night in America, an American pre-game show that is broadcast on NBC
