= FNF =

FNF or FnF may refer to:

== Arts, entertainment, and media ==
- FnF (TV series), a Bangladeshi drama
- "F.N.F. (Let's Go)", a 2022 song by Hitkidd and GloRilla
- Friday Night Fights, an American boxing television series
- Friday Night Funkin', a 2020 rhythm-based video game
- Fresh and Fit Podcast, male self-improvement podcast hosted by Myron Gaines and Walter Weekes, also known as FnF Podcast
- Frisco Jones and Felicia Cummings, a fictional couple on the television series General Hospital, also known as FnF
- "FNF", a 2023 song by Stray Kids from 5-Star

== Businesses and organizations ==
- Families Need Fathers, a British charity organization
- Federação Norte-rio-grandense de Futebol, the Football Association of Rio Grande do Norte, Brazil
- Fidelity National Financial, an American mortgage provider
- Florence Nightingale Foundation, a British nursing organization
- Foreningene Nordens Forbund, a Scandinavian organization
- Friedrich Naumann Foundation, a German political foundation
- National Front for the Family (Frente Nacional por la Familia), a Mexican coalition of over 1000 organizations

== Other uses ==
- Fault not found, a term used in the field of maintenance
- Friday Night Football (disambiguation)
- North Fremantle railway station, in Australia
