= Frisco Jones and Felicia Cummings =

Fictional soap couple

Frisco and Felicia
- Jack and Kristina Wagner as Frisco and Felicia
- Duration: 1984–92, 1994–95, 2013
- Introduced by: Gloria Monty
In-universe information
- Other names: FnF, F&F
- Family: Jones
- Spouse: 1986–92
- Children: Maxie Jones; Georgie Jones
- Grandchildren: Georgie Spinelli; James West; Bailey Louise Jones

Frisco Jones and Felicia Cummings are fictional characters and a supercouple from the American soap opera General Hospital. Frisco has been portrayed by Jack Wagner on and off from 1984 to 1991, from 1994 to 1995, and briefly in 2013. Felicia has been portrayed by Kristina Wagner on and off from 1984 to 2005, from 2007 to 2008, and again since April 27, 2012. She was temporarily portrayed by Sandra Ferguson in 2005. Kristina and Jack Wagner were also married in real life from 1993 to 2006.

== Storyline ==
Felicia Cummings arrived in Port Charles in 1984, dressed as a boy and intent on getting back an Aztec heirloom, in the form of a ring that Frisco Jones had purchased. Felicia claimed the ring as hers and had every intention of getting her property back. While attempting to get her ring back, Felicia quickly attracted Frisco and the two started to fall in love. But Felicia was engaged to the treacherous Peter Harrell (Judson Scott) and therefore couldn't take her relationship with Frisco any further, at the time. After the ring dilemma was settled, Frisco and Felicia traveled to Mexico with Robert Scorpio (Tristan Rogers) and his wife Holly Sutton (Emma Samms) in search of a treasure. Along the way, Felicia also attracted the attention of Sean Donely (John Reilly), but after she turned him down, he became more of a father figure to her and nicknamed her "princess." A year later, Felicia became entangled in another adventure and this one took place in the Asian Quarter. While there, she befriended Jade Soong (Tia Carrere), the granddaughter of the evil villain Mr. Wu, and helped Robert and Anna Devane (Finola Hughes), with their young daughter Robin Scorpio (Kimberly McCullough). She also helped Frisco and Sean stop Mr. Wu's reign of terror and bring him down. Before and during the Asian Quarter adventure, Frisco and Felicia progressed in their relationship and began to date more steadily. Together they moved into a small studio apartment at Bobbie Spencer's (Jacklyn Zeman) Brownstone. After coming to terms with his chosen occupation with the World Security Bureau, Felicia marries Frisco in 1986. They married at the Brownstone and since Frisco was in the police academy and could not travel away, Sean gave them a private honeymoon in his penthouse.

In 1988, Frisco was presumably killed while undercover for the WSB and after a period of mourning, Felicia attempted to move on and married Lucy Coe's (Lynn Herring) cousin Colton Shore. It turns out that Colton had been involuntarily involved in the attack that left Frisco for dead, and in 1989 Frisco turned up alive and well just in time to see Felicia marrying the man who tried to kill him in the city's park. Felicia was unable to choose between Frisco and Colton. After getting into an accident, she developed amnesia and befriended Colton's younger brother Decker Moss (Michael Watson). Felicia soon realized that Frisco was the one for her and she reunites with her lover. In 1990, they are once again married in a small wedding at Sean's penthouse. After their wedding the two go to Europe on what Felicia thinks is a music tour, but in actuality it was really Frisco on secret assignment for the WSB again. While there, Felicia is kidnapped by ex-DVX boss Cesar Faison, but Frisco and Sean rescue her and the three of them return to Port Charles. Later, after accidentally overhearing Frisco talking with another WSB agent about rejoining the organization, Felicia, who has just learned that she's pregnant, runs away to her grandmother's hacienda in Texas. However upon hearing that Frisco's been hurt, she returns to Port Charles. Frisco and Felicia are reunited again and soon their daughter Maxie Jones is born in 1991.

A year later Frisco, Felicia and Maxie moved back to her family's hacienda in Texas. Felicia was constantly worried about the danger that her husband faced and no longer able to take the worry that was eating away at her, Felicia left Frisco. After their divorce, Felicia became involved with the crazy Dr. Ryan Chamberlain (Jon Lindstrom). When Felicia saw Ryan murder his wife Gloria, she developed amnesia but she still managed to make her way back to Port Charles, leaving Maxie in Texas with her grandmother. In Port Charles, Mac Scorpio (John J. York) and Sean tried to protect her from Ryan. Ryan had her committed to an insane asylum, but Mac helped her to escape. Mac and Felicia then went on the run together and the two eventually fell in love. Mac and Felicia almost married in 1994, but the wedding is called off after Ryan crashed the ceremony with a bomb. After dealing with Ryan, Mac and Felicia once again tried to make it down the aisle, but before they got the chance, Maxie got sick with Kawasaki disease. Mac tracks down Frisco and brings him back to Port Charles for Maxie. Maxie later received a new heart from her cousin B.J. Jones, who had died in a school bus accident. With Frisco, Felicia, and Mac surrounding her with love and support Maxie recovers from her illness. Frisco and Felicia celebrate their daughter's recovery by sleeping together and soon after Felicia becomes pregnant again. Mac is devastated by the news, but still continues to support Felicia. After Frisco leaves again, Felicia gives birth to their second daughter, Georgie Jones, on the floor of Luke's (Anthony Geary) club.

On February 4, 2013, Felicia is shocked to find that Frisco has returned unannounced to Port Charles, and the two share a poignant reunion at The Floating Rib. Frisco has returned to win back Felicia's heart and repair his relationship with Maxie. He stays in town for three months and is successful in re-establishing a relationship with Maxie, but he fails at winning back Felicia, who chooses to stay in a relationship with Mac. In his heartbreak, Frisco leaves town again and returns to the WSB.

== See also ==
- List of supercouples
