= List of General Hospital characters introduced in the 1980s =

General Hospital is the longest-running American television serial drama, airing on ABC. Created by Frank and Doris Hursley, who originally set it in a general hospital (hence the title), in an unnamed fictional city. In the 1970s, the city was named Port Charles, New York. The series premiered on April 1, 1963. This is a list of notable characters who significantly impacted storylines and began their run between 1980 and 1989.

== Grant Andrews ==
Grant Andrews
- General Hospital character
- Portrayed by: Brian Patrick Clarke
- Duration: 1983–85
- First appearance: November 28, 1983
- Last appearance: December 10, 1985
- Created by: Anne Howard Bailey
In-universe information
- Other names: Andre Chernin
- Occupation: Russian spy doctor
- Spouse: Celia Quartermaine (1983–85)

Grant Andrews is a fictional character on the ABC soap opera, General Hospital. He was portrayed by actor Brian Patrick Clarke from 1983 to 1985, who also played the character's doppelgänger, Grant Putnam. Actor Fred Divel played the body double during the evil twin storyline where Brian Patrick Clarke's face was unseen and both characters were both in the same scene.

Grant Andrews was a Russian spy trained to take the place of Grant Putnam, who at the time was presumed dead. To do so, Andrews married Putnam's fiancée Celia Quartermaine, as well as became a doctor at General Hospital. He helped Robert Scorpio thwart the Aztec Treasure escapade before leaving town.

== Larry Ashton ==
Larry Ashton
- General Hospital character
- Portrayed by: Hugo Napier (1988–2016); Oliver Muirhead (2017)
- Duration: 1988–1991; 2014; 2016–2017
- First appearance: October 12, 1988
- Last appearance: May 1, 2017
- Created by: Ann Marcus; Norma Monty
In-universe information
- Siblings: Charlie Prince
- Spouse: Tracy Quartermaine; Arielle Gastineau Ashton
- Sons: Ned Quartermaine
- Grandchildren: Brook Lynn Ashton

Larry Ashton is a fictional character on the American soap opera General Hospital. The role was portrayed by Hugo Napier from October 12, 1988 to March 22, 1991, and returned to the series in 2014, and again in 2016. In 2017, Oliver Muirhead briefly assumed the role of Larry.

Larry Ashton came to Port Charles with his wife, Arielle Gastineau Ashton. They came in on their yacht and deeply in debt. They were in search of the Dragon Bone, a key to unlock an ancient Chinese Civilization. Tracy Quartermaine blackmailed Larry into giving her and Ned Ashton a share of the treasure if he found it. Tracy said she would expose him as not being the Ashton family heir if he did not. The search ended when Robert Scorpio's dog buried the key. Larry divorced Arielle who left Port Charles. He lost his title when Charlie Prince turned out to be the real heir. Larry continued to scheme with Tracy to discredit Monica by revealing that Dawn Winthrop was her illegitimate daughter. They posed as a priest and a nun to find information in the convent where Monica gave birth but were exposed when the Quartermaines were visited by Sister Mary Agnes who had given them shelter. He formed a cartel to control global business with carbon disulphide. To achieve their goals, they thought it would be best for Paul Hornsby to marry Tracy to take over her stock of ELQ. Killing her was an option to get control of her stock. The cartel was discovered and put to an end by the Port Charles Police Department. Larry hoped to get Tracy to remarry him, but she turned him down, and he left town.

In October 2014, Larry resurfaced in Port Charles, after having been abducted by Jerry Jacks and left on the patio of the Quartermaine Mansion in a burlap sack. It was later revealed that this was all a trick orchestrated by Luke Spencer who had been mentally ill, and Larry is in cahoots with the villains, including Cesar Faison and Helena Cassadine.

Larry is seen again in April 2017 (Muirhead), when Tracy begins looking for her father's painting. Larry tries to get Tracy to give him half of what the painting is worth but she refuses. Larry is then seen toasting Ned on his engagement to Olivia. It is revealed that he orchestrated the ruse of making Tracy think that Samira Adin was Edward's child in order to get the money he felt he was owed. Ned disowns him and he leaves town without the painting.

== Amanda Barrington ==
Amanda Barrington
- General Hospital character
- Portrayed by: Anne Jeffreys
- Duration: 1984–2004
- First appearance: February 16, 1984
- Last appearance: July 16, 2004
- Introduced by: Gloria Monty
- Spin-off appearances: Port Charles
In-universe information
- Occupation: Socialite; Member of the Board of Directors of General Hospital
- Parents: Katherine (deceased)
- Siblings: Clyde
- Children: Malcolm Barrington; Derek Barrington; Katherine Barrington
- Grandchildren: Mike Webber; Alison Barrington

Amanda Barrington is a fictional character on the ABC soap opera, General Hospital. She was portrayed by veteran Hollywood actress Anne Jeffreys.

=== Storylines ===
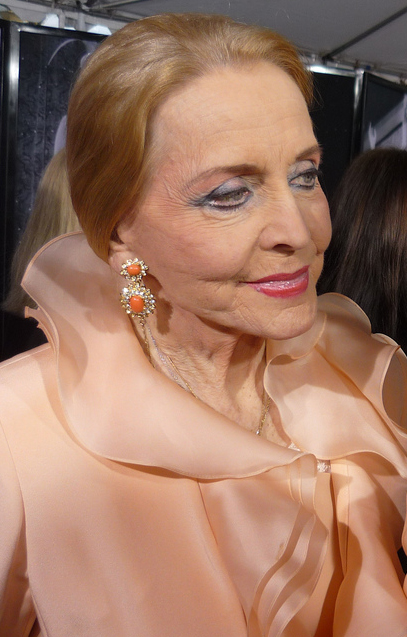
Jeffries portrayed wealthy socialite Amanda for a twenty-year period.

Introduced in 1984, Amanda is a wealthy Port Charles socialite and close friend of Lila Quartermaine and her husband Edward Quartermaine. Amanda has two sons, Derek and Malcolm. Malcolm is deceased, but left behind a wife, Elizabeth, and daughter, Alison. Derek, who later marries Lorena, is the biological father of Mike Webber through an affair with Ginny Blake.

Standoffish and snobbish, Amanda often clashes with many of the doctors at meetings of the board of directors of General Hospital. Amanda's wealthy stature has Lucy Coe fighting for Amanda's affections for nearly 20 years.

In 1984, in a fight against the Quartermaine family, Edward's former mistress Beatrice LeSeur blackmails Edward and Lila, along with Amanda and Sylvia Whitby. Amanda and Sylvia, along with Holly Sutton are also blackmail victims to Leo Russell. Leo, the young masseur at the Avalon Spa, seduces his victims on the massage table and catches compromising positions on a hidden camera device. Beatrice catches wind of this and uses it to her advantage. On the night of an annual charity ball, Beatrice is found dead. Edward, Lila, Alan Quartermaine, Monica Quartermaine, Holly, Amanda, Sylvia, and Leo are all suspects, but all innocent. Throughout the course of the evening, all of them slip drugs in Beatrice's drink in hopes of knocking her out. With the help of Ginny Blake, Robert Scorpio recreates the night of the ball and finds that Beatrice was not murdered, but rather accidentally died when she ingested Lila's heart medication. Amanda, along with the rest of Beatrice's victims, is relieved.

In 1989, Amanda grieves when longtime friend Edward is presumably killed in a plane crash. Amanda donates a plaque to the hospital in honor of Edward. Amanda is delighted, along with the rest of Port Charles, when in 1991, Edward turns up alive and well. In 1992, Amanda welcomed friend Simon Jones to Port Charles but was stunned when he was revealed to be a criminal. When Carly Roberts arrives in town in 1996, she immediately seeks out Amanda's attention after learning from Amy Vining how much money Amanda has.

Amanda becomes a staple at the annual Port Charles tradition of the Nurses Ball, held annually from 1994 to 2001. In 2000, Laura Spencer asks Amanda to be an investor in her upcoming Deception Cosmetics line, to which Amanda politely declines. She remains in Port Charles and is often seen on special occasions with her friends, the Quartermaines and the Baldwins. Her final appearance is at the funeral of her longtime friend, Lila, in July 2004. In 2013, when doing a background check on Alison, John McBain revealed that Amanda had died a few years before.

==== Port Charles ====
2000 also sees the arrival of Amanda's granddaughter, Alison. After breaking her curfew all too often, Amanda orders Alison to become a volunteer at General Hospital. Initially hating it, Alison's mind changes when she meets Jamal Woods, who she helps hide from the police. Alison falls for Jamal, but he pushes her away. Alison is furious to learn that Jamal had made a deal with Amanda to stay away from her. In an attempt to fool Amanda, Jack Ramsey poses as Alison's new boyfriend, Chandler. Amanda agrees to let Alison continue seeing Jamal under the stipulation that she would be disinherited. Alison chooses Jamal over Amanda's money. When Jamal and Alison clash over plans for her to open a bakery alongside their bike shop, Amanda tries making peace between them. While arguing with Alison, Amanda has a heart attack. At Alan's urging, Alison repairs her relationship with Amanda and suspects that a mysterious gift of $25,000 came from her, but it did not.

When vampires descend upon Port Charles, Alison forms an alliance with Livvie Locke, Caleb Morley, and Rafe Kovich in order to take down Joshua Temple, the head vampire. Alison soon learns that Joshua's victims included Frank Scanlon, Victor Collins, Jamal, and Amanda. The vampire's spell is eventually lifted and Amanda is on hand to see Alison marry Rafe.

== Derek Barrington ==
Derek Barrington
- General Hospital character
- Portrayed by: Mark Goddard
- Duration: 1984–86
- First appearance: October 15, 1984
- Last appearance: June 9, 1986
- Introduced by: Gloria Monty
In-universe information
- Occupation: Businessman
- Parents: Amanda Barrington
- Siblings: Malcolm Barrington
- Spouse: Lorena Sharpe (1986—)
- Children: Mike Webber
- Nieces and nephews: Alison Barrington (deceased); Rafe Kovich Jr.

Derek Barrington is a fictional character on the ABC soap opera, General Hospital. He was portrayed by actor Mark Goddard.

Derek is the son of wealthy Port Charles socialite, Amanda Barrington (Anne Jeffreys). He has an affair with Virginia "Ginny" Blake (Judith Chapman) before coming to Port Charles. Ginny becomes pregnant with Michael "Mike" Phelan (David Mendenhall). He is adopted by Rick (now Chris Robinson) and Lesley Webber (Denise Alexander) in 1983. He was the station manager of WLPC and later marries Lorena Sharpe (Shelley Taylor Morgan).

== Ginny Blake ==
Ginny Blake
- General Hospital character
- Portrayed by: Judith Chapman
- Duration: 1984–86
- First appearance: January 31, 1984
- Last appearance: November 26, 1986
In-universe information
- Other names: Virginia Gellar; Virginia Blake; Ginny Webber
- Occupation: TV news anchor/reporter
- Husband: Rick Webber (1984–1996)
- Sons: Mike Webber; Rick Webber Jr.

Ginny Blake Webber is a fictional character on the ABC daytime soap opera, "General Hospital". She was portrayed by Judith Chapman from 1984 to 1986.

== D. L. Brock ==
D. L. Brock
- General Hospital character
- Portrayed by: David Groh
- Duration: 1983–85
- First appearance: May 3, 1983
- Last appearance: January 31, 1985
In-universe information
- Brothers: Terry Brock
- Spouse: Bobbie Spencer (1984–85)

D. L. Brock is a fictional character on the ABC soap opera, General Hospital. He was portrayed by David Groh from 1983 until 1985.

After an affair with Bobbie Spencer, they are married in 1984 by Lee Baldwin. Afterwards he becomes extremely abusive towards her. When he is murdered in 1985, Bobbie is originally suspected, however he was actually killed in self-defense by Ginny Webber.

== Terry Brock ==
Terry Brock is a fictional character on the ABC soap opera, General Hospital. She was portrayed by Robyn Bernard from September 3, 1984, to March 7, 1990.

Terry arrives in PC on Labor Day 1984, and she has her eye on Frisco Jones. In January 1985, she screams when her father, D.L. was shot and murder by Bobbie, but instead he was murdered by Ginny Webber. In Summer 1985, Terry dreams of being a singer, but she had a drinking addiction that kept her from realizing her goal. In February 1986, Terry married Kevin O'Connor. In 1990, she got her recording contract, and left PC on March 7, 1990.

== Mikkos Cassadine ==
Mikkos Cassadine
- General Hospital character
- Portrayed by: John Colicos (1981); Steve Richard Harris (2021)
- Duration: 1981, 2021
- First appearance: August 10, 1981
- Last appearance: April 8, 2021
- Created by: Gloria Monty
In-universe information
- Occupation: Founder of Cassadine Industries; Prince of Greek nobility
- Family: Cassadine
- Father: Ivan Cassadine
- Brothers: Victor Cassadine; Tony Cassadine
- Sisters: Sophia Cassadine
- Spouse: Helena Cassadine (195?–81)
- Sons: Stavros Cassadine; Stefan Cassadine
- Daughters: Alexis Davis; Kristina Cassadine
- Stepsons: Valentin Cassadine
- Grandsons: Nikolas Cassadine
- Granddaughters: Sam Morgan; Kristina Davis; Molly Lansing
- Grandfathers: Stanislaus Cassadine
- Grandmothers: Katya Cassadine
- Aunts: Irina Cassadine
- First cousins: Petros Cassadine; Dimitri Cassadine

Mikkos Ivanovich Cassadine is a fictional character on the ABC soap opera, General Hospital. He was portrayed by John Colicos from August 10, 1981, to September 18, 1981. Mikkos was characterized as one of General Hospital's greatest villains of all time. In the summer of 2006, it was rumored that the show was considering recasting the role with Daytime legend, Joseph Mascolo; however Mascolo returned to his famous role as Stefano DiMera on NBC's Days of Our Lives. On April 8, 2021, Steve Richard Harris portrayed Mikkos in flashbacks during a special episode focused on his daughter, Alexis Davis.

=== Characterization ===
Mikkos Cassadine, according to some critics was "The Face of Evil" hell bent on world domination; similar to many comic book supervillains in pop culture. The Cassadine family were introduced and created by executive producer Gloria Monty. Over the years, Mikkos has been painted as a vicious tyrant, very controlling of all of his children. His personality is similar to that of his widow Helena Cassadine (Constance Towers).

=== Storylines ===
In August 1981, Mikkos Cassadine appears on his private island in Greece with several of his business associates, including his brothers, Victor and Tony. Mikkos presents his plan to use the world's largest uncut diamond, the Ice Princess to power his weather machine and force the entire world to bend to his will, and allow him to rebuild the world in his own pure, perfect image. The first step of Mikkos's plan is to freeze the world, starting with Port Charles, New York; the hometown of Luke and Laura Spencer. By freezing Port Charles, Mikkos could bring the world to its knees and force its leaders to do his bidding. Mikkos refuses to negotiate with the World Security Bureau (WSB) and lowers the temperature in Port Charles so low that it is declared a disaster area. However, the machine malfunctions killing Tony and Alexandria Quartermaine along with others. However Mikkos remains. Luke, Laura and WSB agent, Robert Scorpio break into the Cassadine compound, to stop Mikkos; during a struggle with Luke, Mikkos is frozen to death after falling into his own ice chamber. Luke is able to shut down the machine and Port Charles is safe; Victor is sent to prison. However, Mikkos's murder at the hands of the Spencer clan would affect the show for years to come.

=== Impact ===
The feud between the Cassadine and Spencer families start after Mikkos's death; his widow Helena decides to take revenge on Luke and Laura. For years, she tortures them all because of her plans to avenge the murder of Mikkos.

Mikkos and Helena's controlling ways are often mentioned as the reason for the family being so screwed up. Their oldest son, Stavros in 1983, kidnaps Laura Spencer, forces her into marriage and to bear his son, Nikolas. Their other son, the gentler Stefan, is looked down upon for not being more like his brother, and parents. Stefan also has a thing for Laura, but he is killed by Luke in 2003. In the 1990s, it is revealed that Mikkos had an affair with the Swedish opera singer, Kristin Bergman who bore him two children, Natasha and Kristina Cassadine. When Helena finds out about the affair, she kills Kristen forcing Mikkos to send his daughters into hiding. The infant Kristina is put up for adoption, while Natasha's name is changed to Alexis and Mikkos lies, claiming she is the daughter of his late sister, Sophia, and raises her in Greece with his sons. In 2009, Helena reveals that Mikkos had another bastard child, the evil Valentin who had been disowned by Mikkos years earlier. Valentin is initially meant to cause more trouble for the Spencers and even the Cassadines, however the storyline is dropped. Mikkos and Helena are also believed to have another child, Irina Cassadine, who is shot to death by Helena in early 2012. Though Helena claims Irina as her daughter, it was never stated that she was fathered by Mikkos.

Mikkos's tyrannical spirit also affects his grandchildren, most significantly his granddaughter, Sam McCall. When a 16 years Alexis gets pregnant at boarding school, Mikkos forces Alexis into giving Sam up for adoption. Mikkos then forges a death certificate to make sure Alexis can never find her daughter.

In 2016, Valentin Cassadine finally makes contact with his family, killing off his nephew Nikolas and claiming the Cassadine fortune for himself. Valentin reveals that he was shipped off to boarding school in Bedlington, England when was around 5 or 6 years old and never returned home.

== Victor Cassadine ==
Victor Cassadine
- General Hospital character
- Portrayed by: Thaao Penghlis (1981, 2014); Charles Shaughnessy (2021–2023)
- Duration: 1981; 2014; 2021–2023
- First appearance: July 8, 1981
- Last appearance: May 8, 2023
- Created by: Pat Falken Smith
- Introduced by: Gloria Monty (1981); Frank Valentini (2014, 2021)
In-universe information
- Occupation: Director of the WSB; Prince of Greek nobility Director of Crichton-Clark Clinic
- Family: Cassadine
- Father: Ivan Cassadine
- Brothers: Mikkos Cassadine; Tony Cassadine
- Sisters: Sophia Cassadine
- Sons: Valentin Cassadine
- Granddaughters: Charlotte Cassadine
- Grandfathers: Stanislaus Cassadine
- Grandmothers: Katya Cassadine
- Aunts: Irina Cassadine
- Nephews: Stavros Cassadine; Stefan Cassadine
- Nieces: Alexis Davis; Kristina Cassadine
- First cousins: Petros Cassadine; Dimitri Cassadine
- Other relatives: Nikolas Cassadine; Sam Morgan; Kristina Davis; Molly Lansing; Spencer Cassadine

Victor Cassadine was originated by Thaao Penghlis in the 1981 Ice Princess storyline. On January 31, 2014, Penghlis reprised the role on and off until September 16, 2014. Charles Shaughnessy assumed to the role on September 2, 2021, and exited on May 8, 2023.

=== Storylines ===
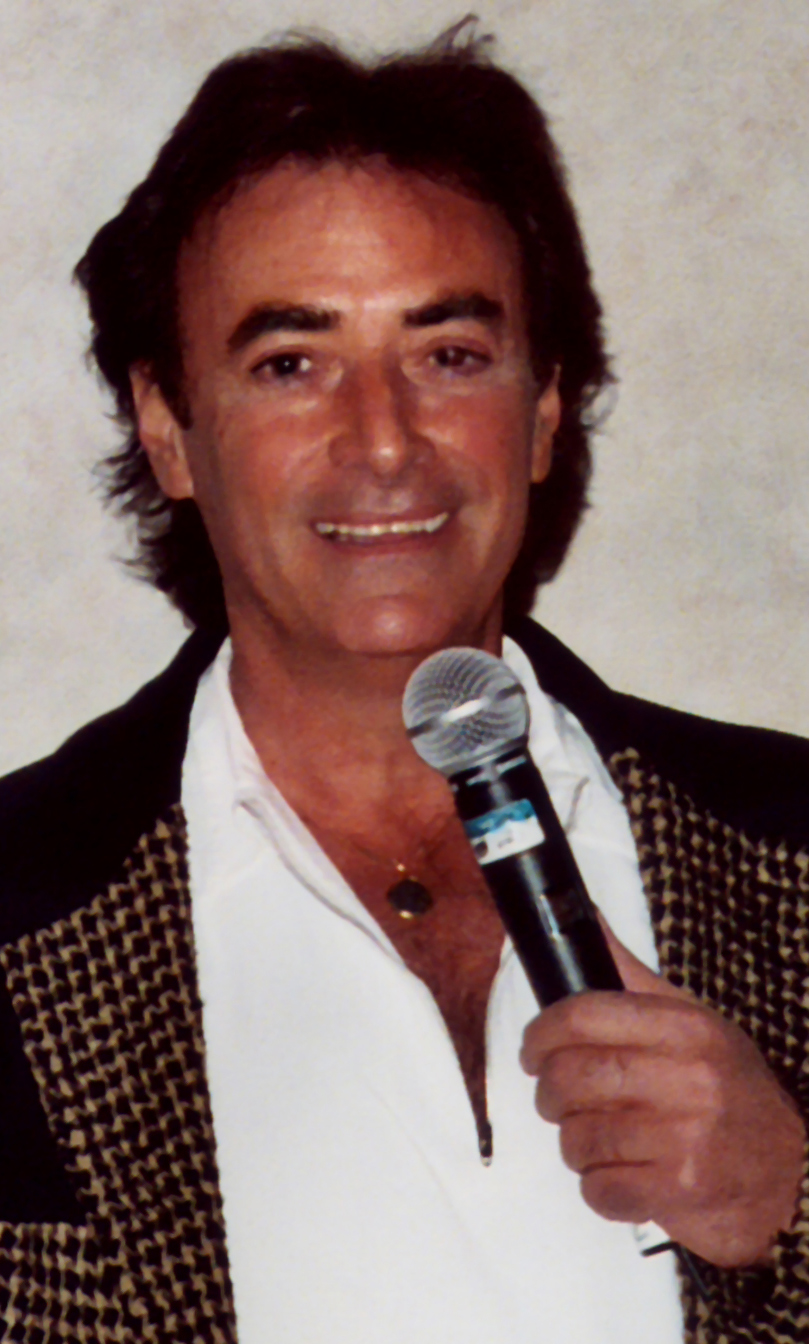
Thaao Penghlis originated the role in 1981 and reprised it in 2014.

Victor first appears as a minor character in July 1981 along with Tony. Victor has a short affair with Tiffany Hill while he and Tony assist their oldest brother Mikkos with his plan to use the world's largest uncut diamond, the Ice Princess to power his weather machine and force the entire world to bend to his will, and allow him to rebuild the world in his own pure, perfect image. While Tony and Mikkos get killed in the process, Victor is imprisoned for his part in Mikkos' scheme. It has later been suggested Victor died in prison.

In January 2014, Victor returns to Port Charles. He is now the director of the WSB and as such was involved in freeing Liesl Obrecht and getting her the job as chief-of-staff of General Hospital after meeting Sonny Corinthos from her cell. Victor visits the recently returned Robin Scorpio, who has been kept away for almost two years, and announces he has big plans for her. Victor wants Robin to help him to bring back his sister-in-law Helena Cassadine – who has been shot by Luke Spencer – and his nephew Stavros – who has been frozen by Laura Spencer. Victor showed Robin proof her friend Jason Morgan was alive. She agreed to help him. While in Port Charles, Victor acquainted himself with great-nephew Nikolas Cassadine and his son Spencer, before departing for the Crichton-Clark facility in Scarsdale with Robin and later encounters Heather Webber. In May, Victor made a brief appearance to deliver a message from Robin to her husband, Patrick Drake, as well as deliver stolen embryos to Lulu Spencer and Dante Falconeri, at the request of former love interest, Liesl Obrecht.

In August 2014, it is discovered Victor had threatened a troubled Rafe Kovich Jr. into causing an accident involving Patrick, his daughter Emma, and ex-fiancée Sabrina Santiago that had resulted in the death of Patrick and Sabrina's son, Gabriel, who had been born premature as a result. Meanwhile, Robin has been successful in fulfilling Victor's plans to resurrect his dead relatives, as well as Jason, who Victor intends to use for his own purposes based on Jason's past as mafia hitman. Victor is discovered to be the employer of Peter Harrell Jr., who had been conning Maxie Jones for months in an effort to obtain her mother, Felicia's, Aztec jewels. After Peter kidnaps Maxie and Lulu to a secluded cabin, they are nearly rescued by Dante and Nathan West (Liesl's son) before Victor gasses the place, and abducts all four of them to the Crichton-Clark facility. While at the facility, Lulu and Dante are left to face a recently resurrected Stavros. Maxie comes face to face with Peter Harrell Sr., seeking revenge for an incident with her parents years ago. Meanwhile, Victor develops suspicions about Nathan's paternity and orders a DNA test on the young detective to confirm whether he is his son. Back in Port Charles, Liesl deduces her son and his friends are being held at the Crichton-Clark facility, and aids police commissioner Anna Devane in a raid. Liesl confronts Victor, telling him that Nathan is in fact his son, but when the test results prove otherwise, Liesl shoots and kills Victor. As a result, a detonation sequence is triggered to protect sensitive material, and Liesl, Anna, Nathan, Maxie, Dante, and Lulu all escape the facility (along with Robin, Jason, and a resurrected Helena who escaped through other means). Not even Jordan Ashford knows about Victor.

One year later, his counterpart Paul Hornsby returns to Port Charles in attempted revenge for Victor and Valentin Cassadine.

In 2021 Victor reappears and was involved in the kidnapping of Drew Cain. He also reveals Valentin is his son.

== Stavros Cassadine ==
Stavros Cassadine
- General Hospital character
- Portrayed by: John Martinuzzi (1983); Robert Kelker-Kelly (2001–2014)
- Duration: 1983; 2001–2003; 2013–2014
- First appearance: November 17, 1983
- Last appearance: September 16, 2014
- Created by: Anne Howard Bailey
- Introduced by: Gloria Monty (1983); Jill Farren Phelps (2001); Frank Valentini (2013)
- Spin-off appearances: Port Charles
In-universe information
- Other names: Lucien Cane
- Occupation: Prince
- Family: Cassadine
- Parents: Mikkos Cassadine; Helena Cassadine
- Brothers: Stefan Cassadine
- Half-brothers: Valentin Cassadine
- Half-sisters: Alexis Davis; Kristina Cassadine; Irina Cassadine
- Spouse: Laura Webber (1982–83); Lulu Spencer (2013)
- Sons: Nikolas Cassadine
- Grandsons: Spencer Cassadine; Ace Cassadine
- Grandparents: Ivan Cassadine; Basil Romanov; Agatha Romanov
- Uncles: Victor Cassadine; Tony Cassadine
- Aunts: Sophia Davidovitch
- Nieces: Sam Morgan; Kristina Davis; Molly Lansing; Charlotte Cassadine
- Other relatives: Petros Cassadine; Dimitri Cassadine

Stavros Nikolai Mikkosovich Cassadine is a fictional character from the ABC daytime soap opera General Hospital. The role was originated by John Martinuzzi, who portrayed the role from November 17 to December 14, 1983. Eighteen years later, the role was recast with Robert Kelker-Kelly, who portrayed the role from June 1 to November 9, 2001, at which time the character was believed to have died. Kelker-Kelly subsequently reprised the role for several episodes, as a hallucination, between February 14, 2002, and December 24, 2003. On April 10, 2013, Kelker-Kelly reprised the role amidst intense secrecy on the part of the series.

Stavros Cassadine was first introduced to the series in November 1983, as he attempted to reclaim his "wife" Laura Spencer from her long-time love Luke Spencer. Over a year earlier, Stavros had arranged for Laura's abduction, having become completely obsessed with her. After telling Laura that Luke had died, Stavros took Laura to an island, where he married and raped her, the latter event resulting in the conception of their son, Nikolas. Jealous over her son's obsession with Laura, Stavros' mother, Helena helped Laura escape from his captivity. Stavros, however, managed to track Laura down, and following an encounter with Luke, fell down a flight of stairs, broke his neck, and died.

In June 2001, Stavros was revealed to have been cryogenically frozen by Helena, until medical science could revive her son. After recovering from his injury, Stavros quickly began wreaking havoc upon the citizens of Port Charles, namely Laura and his own brother, Stefan. Under the alias of businessman Lucien Cane, Stavros began to build a relationship with Chloe Morgan, seeking to undermine her relationship with his brother. When Chloe discovered Stavros' true identity, he murdered her and framed Stefan for the crime. Stavros also began manipulating Gia Campbell, in an effort to obtain information on Nikolas, and deduce whether or not Nikolas would remain loyal to the Cassadines.

Eventually, Laura and Stefan were able to conclude the Stavros was alive, prompting Stefan to break out of prison. After confronting Stavros on Spoon Island, Stefan tied him up and left him inside an empty coffin. However, when the police came looking for Stefan, they freed Stavros, and following some questions, let him go. When the time came for Stavros and Nikolas to come face to face, Helena arranged for Nikolas to believe that Stavros was still frozen, prompting Nikolas to declare that he hated his father and hoped he remained "dead". Subsequently, Helena lured a handful of her enemies to the underground laboratory where she had kept Stavros hidden, and trapped them inside. Stavros, in an effort to prove his love for Nikolas, gave him the necessary information to escape the laboratory, with Gia in tow. Following a vicious altercation with Luke, Stavros found himself dangling over the entrance to a bottomless pit, and in one final effort to thumb his nose at Luke, threw up his hands and fell to his presumed death.

In April 2013, Stavros was revealed to be alive, after Helena had saved him from the bottom of the pit twelve years earlier. With Stavros on the brink of death, Helena whisked him away to Cassadine Island in Greece, where he had been recovering ever since. Stavros is eventually discovered to be alive by Nikolas sometime in December 2012, and in an effort to discover what his father and grandmother are up to, attempts to endear himself to them. On April 12, Luke and Laura rescue Lulu from Stavros and trap him in his own cryogenic chamber. He is presumed dead.

Following the intervention of his uncle, Victor Cassadine, Stavros is resurrected in September 2014, due largely in part to research performed by Robin Scorpio. After Victor arranges for Lulu, Dante, Maxie Jones and Nathan West to be captured, Stavros reappears with the intention of impregnating Lulu with an embryo he had harvested from her the year prior. Stavros' efforts fail, and he is shot to death by Dante. Despite this, a resurrected Helena gets her hands on the embryo, and flees the Crichton-Clark just as it explodes.

In 2024, Charlie Mason from Soaps She Knows called Stavros "vile" and noted how Helena would fawn over him.

== Anna Devane ==
Anna Devane
- General Hospital character
- Portrayed by: Finola Hughes (1985–present); Camilla More (1991–1992)
- Duration: 1985–1992; 1995; 2001–2003; 2006–2008; 2012–present
- First appearance: April 10, 1985
- Created by: Pat Falken Smith and Norma Monty
- Introduced by: Gloria Monty (1985); Wendy Riche (1995); Jean Dadario Burke (2001); Jill Farren Phelps (2006); Frank Valentini (2012)
- Book appearances: Robin's Diary
- Spin-off appearances: General Hospital: Night Shift
- Crossover appearances: All My Children
In-universe information
- Other names: Anna Scorpio; Anna Lavery; Anna Hayward; White Rose (DVX); The Adventurous One (Spinelli); Alice Everett-Ashton; Anna Everett-Ashton; Davnee (Faison)
- Occupation: FBI agent; Police commissioner; Private investigator; Chief of police; WSB Agent; Double agent; Art dealer
- Father: Thomas Devane
- Sisters: Alex Marick; Lindsay Devane
- Half-brothers: Gabriel Devane
- Husband: Robert Scorpio (1976–1977, 1991–1992); Duke Lavery (1987–1989); David Hayward (2002–2003)
- Daughters: Robin Scorpio-Drake; Leora Hayward
- Grandsons: Noah Drake
- Granddaughters: Emma Drake
- Uncles: Fredrick Devane
- Aunts: Rose
- Nephews: Aidan Devane; Peter August

Anna Devane is played by Finola Hughes. Hughes also appeared as Anna on All My Children, and the General Hospital prime time, spin-off series, General Hospital: Night Shift. The character first appeared on the April 10, 1985, episode of General Hospital as a fence. The character was created and introduced by executive producer, Gloria Monty, and co-head writers, Pat Falken Smith and Norma Monty. Upon her introduction, Anna is revealed to be the super spy ex-wife of Robert Scorpio and romantic rival to his current wife, Holly Sutton. Anna remained a prominent character in the series until 1992 due to her romantic pairings with Robert and former mobster, Duke Lavery. The storyline in which Duke tries to evade his criminal past with the Jerome family, allows for Duke and Anna to become one of the show's supercouples, along with Robert and Anna. However, the storyline ends in tragedy when Duke dies in Anna's arms. Robert and Anna eventually reunite to raise their daughter, Robin, and eventually remarry; the happiness is short lived and the duo are killed off in 1992 along with their rival, Cesar Faison.

However, all three were eventually revealed to be alive. Anna reappeared on All My Children as the twin sister of Alex Marick on March 2, 2001. In addition to working as chief of police, and a brief romance with Edmund Grey, Anna marries Dr. David Hayward and they had a child together; however, that child dies as an infant. Hughes returned to General Hospital for several guest stints between 2006 and 2008. Throughout the summer and fall of 2008, Anna appeared on Night Shift where she supported Robert through his battle with cancer and helped Robin prepare for motherhood. Anna returned to the series indefinitely in 2012 when Robin was presumed dead. She has a romance with Robert's best friend, Luke Spencer, and reunites with Duke, whom Faison is masquerading as. The real Duke is later revealed to be alive. Anna has become one of the most respected and celebrated heroines in all of daytime.

=== Casting ===
Hughes joined the cast of General Hospital in the spring of 1985, and made her first appearance on April 10, 1985. Hughes auditioned for the role of Anna in early 1985, about three months after she relocated to New York City. About two weeks later, Hughes was shocked when she actually got hired because the role was originally written for an American actress. In late 1991, rumors circulated that Hughes had been fired. However, instead during contract negotiations, she took advantage of an out clause to work on another project. Hughes last taped scenes aired during December 16, last airing on December 17, 1991. If negotiations went well, Hughes was slated to return by the spring of 1992. In the interim, she was replaced by Camilla Moore who made her first appearance December 20, 1991. Moore last appeared on January 20, 1992, and Hughes returned to the role for one episode on February 25, 1992. Hughes briefly returned from November 13 to 22, 1995 as Anna's spirit to comfort the character's daughter Robin Scorpio (Kimberly McCullough), who is dealing with the loss of her boyfriend to AIDS-related illness and is herself HIV-positive. On All My Children, when Hughes reprised the role of Alex in February 2001 after her maternity leave, Hughes also made her first appearance as Anna on March 2, 2001.

In late July 2003, All My Children announced that Hughes would exit in the role of Anna when her contract expired. Hughes made her final appearance on September 11, 2003. An ABC spokesperson hinted that Hughes could return to the series in a recurring capacity but she never did. Rumors immediately followed that Hughes would return to GH. However, Hughes later revealed in an interview that she was open to a return, but had not been contacted by the series. When Tristan Rogers returned to the series as Robert in 2006, many speculated that Hughes would return to the series as well. However instead, Emma Samms instead returned to the series. Samms and Rogers's returns intensified speculation that Hughes would eventually reprise her role, Though initial reports hinted that Hughes refused to return, ABC finally confirmed Hughes's return in April 2006. Hughes first reappeared May 12, 2006. Hughes concluded her stint on August 30, and returned once again from July 13 to August 24, 2007.

In late March 2008, it was announced that Hughes would make a return to General Hospital. Hughes reappeared on April 25, 2008, and concluded her return stint on May 7, 2008. Days later, it was announced that Hughes would soon join the cast of The Young and the Restless and was slated to begin airing on June 19, 2008. At the time, Hughes was not contractually obligated to ABC, so accepted the four episode guest stint. However, Michael Logan of TV Guide later reported that ABC pressured Hughes into dropping out of the role in favor of a "big" storyline for the summer on GH. Hughes who was scheduled to start taping on May 28, was never actually replaced and her character was never introduced onscreen. On December 11, 2011, TV Guide confirmed that Hughes would return to General Hospital starting in mid January and would reappear just in time for February Sweeps. Hughes first airdate was slated for the week of February 13, 2012. On April 6, 2012, executive producer, Frank Valentini announced on Twitter that Hughes had been placed on contract with the series.

In October 2015, it was reported that Hughes has inked a deal with the series and will remain in the role of Anna.

=== Storylines ===
Anna is introduced in 1985 as skilled jewel thief who takes an interest in Robert Scorpio (Tristan Rogers) and his wife Holly Sutton (Emma Samms). Anna is soon revealed to be Robert's ex-wife whom he divorced upon discovering she was a double-agent working for the DVX. Anna works as Sean Donely's (John Reilly) secretary and partners with him to fence the Aztec treasure. However, the treasure goes missing forcing Anna and Robert to team up which makes Holly jealous. As the revelation about their marriage leads to Holly leaving Robert, Anna teams up with Robert and Grant Andrews (Brian Patrick Clarke) to bring down Donely who has gone rogue. When Robert goes missing during their mission, Anna returns home to find her apartment destroyed and her old friend Filomena Soltini (Argentina Brunetti) tied up. It is revealed that Filomena has been secretly been raising Robert and Anna's daughter Robin (Kimberly McCullough) as her granddaughter. Robert resurfaces and confronts Anna about Robin who overhears the truth and runs away. She is kidnapped forcing Anna and Robert to rescue her. Later, Anna is named co-police chief along with Burt Ramsey (Bob Hastings). In 1986, Anna falls for the handsome mysterious club-owner Duke Lavery (Ian Buchanan). When her friends Frisco and Felicia (Jack Wagner and Kristina Wagner) go missing, Anna suspects Duke is involved but her urges her to trust him. As Duke and Anna are engaged in October 1986, Robert exposes Duke's involvement in a money laundering scheme for the mysterious "Mr. Big." Soon after, Anna's home is bombed and Duke assures Anna he loves her and decides to get out of the mob for good. However, Duke is framed by his boss, the mysterious "Mr. Big" and ends up in jail. Robert then enlist Anna and Frisco's help to expose "Mr. Big" who turns out to be Anna's corrupt partner Ramsey. After the death of his father Angus McKay (Guy Doleman), Anna becomes suspicious of Duke's relationship with his half-sister, Camellia (Elizabeth Keifer). In May 1987, Anna is horrified when the press crashes her wedding to expose that Duke covered up Camellia's murder of Evan Jerome, the son of mobster kingpin Victor Jerome (Jack Axelrod). Anna dumps Duke and starts her own private investigator firm, and a recently widowed Robert becomes her partner. Robert and Anna bond as they work together and he wants to reunite but she chooses to go back to Duke instead. Duke and Anna are married in a traditional Scottish wedding on October 19, 1987. In January 1988, the deranged Grant Putnam (Brian Patrick Clarke) kills Filomena after a failed attempt to kidnap Robin, and abducts Anna instead. Robert tracks Putnam and Anna to the Adirondack Mountains and rescues her. Anna settles into a happy life with Duke while working with Robert as they co-parent Robin. In the summer of 1988, Anna announces she is pregnant. However, Anna suffers a miscarriage in October 1988 when she is trapped in an elevator rigged to fall by Victor's jealous daughter Olivia St. John (Tonja Walker), who had become obsessed with Duke. When Olivia is shot and left comatose, Anna is arrested for her attempted murder. Anna is cleared when Victor's bastard son Dino (Chris DeRose) is revealed to be behind the shooting. Anna is relieved when Olivia is shipped off to a mental hospital in 1989. However, Anna's life with Duke comes to an end when he is killed in a fire in April 1989, as revenge for testifying against the mob.

In 1990, Olivia having escaped the sanitarium tells Anna that Duke is alive and posing as art dealer, Jonathan Paget (Gregory Beecroft). As Anna and Duke are about to reunite, Duke is shot by Victor's son Julian Jerome (Jason Culp) in retaliation for him betraying the Jerome family. Robert postpones his wedding to Katherine Delafield (Edie Lehmann) to comfort Anna. Robin convinces Anna and Frisco to help her friend Casey the Alien (Bradley Lockerman) recover his crystal and return to his home planet of Lumina. Anna, Robin and Casey kidnapped are by adventure novelist P.K. Sinclair, who is revealed to be Anna's obsessive arch-rival Cesar Faison (Anders Hove). Faison's plans to steal Casey's crystals are thwarted and Anna helps Casey go home. On Valentine's Day 1991, Robin sends Anna and Robert cards signed with each other's names. They later attend Robin's dance recital where they continue flirting. After a romantic dinner, Anna seduces Robert only to tie him up and leave him for Frisco to find him. Their cat-mouse games leads to the two falling in love again. Robert ends up in the hospital when someone tries to kill him and his estranged brother Mac (John J. York) is the prime suspect. While Mac feigns innocence, Robert is released into Anna's care and they make love for the first time in years. Robert proposes to Anna and she accepts. They are married on June 28, 1991, in Lila Quartermaine's (Anna Lee) garden. Robin is the maid of honor and Mac is the best man. In November 1991, Anna discovers Lila's presumed dead husband Edward Quartermaine (David Lewis) alive and reunites him with his family. In January 1992, Robert and Anna's marriage is upended by the return of a very much alive Holly and the return of Faison, who kidnaps Anna in February 1992. After Faison accidentally kills Anna's childhood Au pair, his own mother, Nanny McTavish (Helena Carroll) when she steps in front of his gun to prevent him from shooting Holly and Robert, Robert asks Holly to take care of Robin and then immediately leaves to rescue Anna. In May 1992, Anna and Robert are reportedly killed in a boat explosion, along with Faison.

Anna is revealed to be alive in March 2001 when her twin-sister Alex (Hughes) returns to her home in Pine Valley to announce that she's been secretly caring for her sister. Months earlier, Alex had been summoned to Canada by Bart (Ralph Waite). Bart had been caring for Anna when she began having seizures. Bart immediately contacts Alex for help. With the help of her brother-in-law Dimitri Marick (Michael Nader) and his brother Edmund Grey (John Callahan), Anna checks into Pine Valley Medical Center, posing as Alex. Alex also enlist her colleague David Hayward (Vincent Irizarry) to heal her sister. While Anna recovers, she has no recollection of her life in Port Charles. Meanwhile, Anna learned from Alex that their aunt Charlotte had put a hit out on her. The failed hit puts claims the life of Gillian Andrassy. Anna settled into her new life and also met her half-brother Gabriel. Charlotte had brainwashed Gabriel to kill Anna but The sisters are able to break the conditioning. In May 2001, Anna shares a happy reunion with Robin. While she wanted to be with Robin, Anna knew she'd put her in danger. Anna turns to the WSB for protection and they partner her up with federal agent Chris Stamp to apprehend the drug lord Proteuos.

In 2002, Anna finds David secretly meeting with Roger Smythe (Mark Pinter), a runner for Proteus. David claims he's been treating Roger's heart condition with experimental drugs. Chris pressures Anna to turn David into the authorities and Anna sets out to protect him, so she offers to marry him. David and Anna are married in March 2002, for convenience, though they've fallen in love. As Anna's is named chief of police, David's mother Vanessa Bennett (Marj Dusay) is revealed to be Proteus. Anna is furious to learn that David played a part in the disappearance of Edmund's wife, Maria Santos (Eva LaRue) and she leaves him. However, soon after Anna learns she is pregnant and reluctantly tells David. She finds support in her nephew Aidan (Aiden Turner). Despite his warms feelings toward her, Anna is suspicious of Aidan. She learns Aidan has been framed for murder and there is still a hit out on him.

David sets out to win Anna back and confesses to his crimes. David is sentenced to community service at a free clinic. Anna goes to visit David and is taken hostage at knifepoint by troubled teen Reggie Porter (Chadwick Boseman). After the ordeal, Anna learns her baby suffers from a congenital heart defect and needs emergency surgery. Since David is still on probation, Anna travels to Switzerland to see a specialist. David surprises Anna by arranging for Robin to meet her there. During the operation, the doctor suffers a stroke and David is rushed to Switzerland to save Anna and their daughter. Anna gives birth to daughter Leora Devane Hayward on February 26, 2003, named after David's late brother, Leo du Pres (Josh Duhamel). When Leora's condition worsens, Joe Martin (Ray MacDonnell) convinces Anna to agree to another surgery. Leora does not survive and David lashes out accusing him of killing Leora for revenge. Anna in turns finds comfort with district attorney Jackson Montgomery (Walt Willey). Anna reaches out to David only to find him trying to poison the Martins with an amnesia drug. Anna locks David in his cabin until he accepts Leora's death as an accident. In the summer of 2003, Anna oversees the investigation into the murder of Michael Cambias (William deVry). Michael's supposed wife Kendall Hart (Alicia Minshew) is the prime suspect but Anna discovers finds evidence implicating David and Kendall's mother Erica Kane (Susan Lucci). Realizing she couldn't remain objective, Anna leaves the evidence at David's cabin with a letter. She reveals she is going to Paris to live with Robin and does not want David to follow.

Anna resurfaces in 2006 when she runs into Robin and a very much alive Robert in the Markham Islands. Robert and Luke Spencer (Anthony Geary) have gotten involved in jewelry heist with Holly Sutton (Emma Samms) and end up in prison. Robin comes to free her father while Anna comes looking for the jewels. Anna promises to visit Port Charles to catch up with Robin and to meet Robin's boyfriend, Patrick Drake (Jason Thompson). Anna comes to Port Charles a few weeks later investigating Lorenzo Alcazar (Ted King) and uses Robin as her cover story. Disappointed to learn that Patrick and Robin have split, Anna convinces Robin to give Patrick another chance. When Anna realizes Robin is in love, she makes sure Patrick feels the same way before she leaves on assignment. Anna returns in 2007 and helps Patrick's father Noah Drake (Rick Springfield) pass himself off as rock star Eli Love during the LIFEbeat concert which is held in support of HIV/AIDS awareness. She and Noah have a brief fling before she skips town again. Anna returns in 2008 and is shocked to learn Robin is pregnant. Anna initially struggles with the news she is going to be a grandmother and gets drunk with Luke. A brief visit from Eli helps Anna come to terms with being a grandmother and she finally told Robin how excited she is. On the prime time spin-off, General Hospital: Night Shift, Anna is at Robert's side when he is diagnosed with colon cancer. Anna finds comfort spending time with Robin and Mac when Robert falls into a coma. During Patrick and Robin's wedding ceremony in October 2008, Robin goes into labor. Anna is terrified when Robin falls into a coma shortly after giving birth to her daughter Emma. Robin recovers and enlist Anna as her maid of honor when she and Patrick finally marry in December 2008 and Robert is there to walk her down the aisle.

Anna returns to town in February 2012, shortly before Robin is killed in a hospital lab explosion. Anna delivers the sad news to Mac and tries to contact Robert. She sends Luke after Robert, who storms off after viewing Robin's remains in the morgue. When Robert returns, he tells Anna that Luke told him he is the father of Holly's son, Ethan Lovett, who has been kidnapped by Helena Cassadine. Robert doesn't want to lose another child, so he decides to find Ethan and leaves Anna behind, going before Robin's funeral, not knowing that Luke and Holly lied to him in order to give him a reason to live.

=== Reception ===
In 2023, Charlie Mason from Soaps She Knows placed Anna #12 on his ranked list of General Hospital’s 40+ Greatest Characters of All Time, commenting that "The word “kickass” could’ve been coined to describe the former police commissioner, an all-around Superwoman whose capacity for hand-to-hand combat is matched only by her aptitude for heart-to-heart love."

== Sean Donely ==
Sean Donely
- General Hospital character
- Portrayed by: John Reilly
- Duration: 1984–95; 2008; 2013
- First appearance: October 31, 1984
- Last appearance: August 12, 2013
- Created by: Anne Howard Bailey
- Introduced by: Gloria Monty (1984); Lisa de Cazotte (2008); Frank Valentini (2013)
- Book appearances: Robin's Diary
- Spin-off appearances: General Hospital: Night Shift
In-universe information
- Other names: El Patron
- Occupation: Police commissioner director of the wsb private investigator business entrepreneur
- Parents: Martin Donely; Blanche Bouley Donely
- Spouse: Tiffany Hill (1988–2021)
- Children: Connor Olivera; Anna Donely
- Other relatives: Robin Scorpio-Drake (goddaughter); Maxie Jones (goddaughter)

Sean Donely is a fictional character from the popular ABC soap opera General Hospital. He was portrayed by actor John Reilly from October 31, 1984, to February 24, 1995, and October 2008 on the two-part Season 2 finale of the General Hospital spin-off General Hospital: Night Shift. He is married to Tiffany Hill, with whom he has a daughter named Anna.

In 1984, Luke Spencer was on the run from murder charges and called his best friend Robert Scorpio for help. Robert sent Luke to an old friend of his, Sean Donely, who was Robert's boss from his old WSB days. Regrettably for Robert and Luke, Sean was actually after the Aztec treasure himself. Sean, who had previously gone into retirement, got bored with the retired life and craved the excitement of going up against the challenge of another experienced spy – and that challenge came in the form of Robert. Sean kidnapped those close to Robert. However, his plan to get a little excitement went terribly wrong when he thought he killed Robert in a shootout and hand-to-hand fight on a mountain top and an aerial cable car during a confrontation at the end of the caper. Sean was devastated. When Robert turned up alive and well, Sean was so ecstatic he did not even fight Robert when Robert came to arrest him. Sean and Robert made amends when he helped Robert defeat the evil Mr. Wu in the Asian Quarter adventure. In return for helping him protect his family, Robert made Sean his daughter Robin's godfather. Robert also helped secure a pardon for Sean for any past crimes. Robin Scorpio is Robert's daughter with Anna Devane. Sean happily accepted and took his job as Robin's godfather very seriously. During this time, Sean also took a liking to Dr. Monica Quartermaine. The two began to have a love affair, angrily opposed by both Edward Quartermaine and Monica's on-and-off love Alan Quartermaine. In 1987, Sean was put on a hit list, made by a group of terrorists targeting spies. Due to his occupation as former head of the WSB, Sean was next up on their hit list. His good friend Robert returned to Port Charles to help protect him, his family, and friends. With the help of Anna, Tiffany Hill, and Duke Lavery, Robert and Sean traveled with them to Mt. Rushmore and the group was able to stop and catch the rogue terrorist group and their leader.

In 1988, Sean started to suffer from a mid-life crisis. During this time, he fell for Dr. Greta Ingstrom, but her husband resurfaced. Sean went back to his past love Tiffany, who was unhappy with his wandering ways. Sean and Tiffany were able to work out their differences. The two were married in the Quartermaine mansion amongst friends and family. After the wedding, Sean assisted his friend Felicia Jones in tracking down her husband Frisco's grave after she was informed he had been killed. Sean's insidious past came back to bite him in the form of his nemesis Cesar Faison, who arrived in Port Charles in 1990. Through flashbacks, it was revealed the two had plotted to destroy Robert and Anna's marriage back in their WSB days. Back when Sean was head of the WSB, he helped Cesar fake his death. One of the heads of rival spy agency, the DVX, helped to break the Scorpios apart, with Robert staying with the WSB and Anna going to work for DVX. Robert and Anna found out the truth. Nevertheless, Sean still helped his friends defeat Faison before Faison could force Anna into marrying him. Cesar took his revenge on Sean in 1991, when he poisoned Sean's wife Tiffany, leaving her with a mysterious illness that left her comatose. Cesar held the cure and used this as leverage to make Sean do his bidding, though at the time Sean did not realize Cesar was behind Tiffany's illness. When Sean found out Cesar was behind everything, he once again teamed up with Robert and Anna to bring him down.

In 1992, Sean became the police commissioner and was devastated when his two closest friends, Robert and Anna, were presumed dead from a boat explosion which occurred when they were trying to stop Faison. Sean split his time between comforting his grieving goddaughter Robin, and dealing with his nemesis Luke, who arrived back in town in 1993 and gave Sean nothing but grief. On the personal front, his marriage began to fall apart when his wife Tiffany became obsessed with adopting her deceased sister Cheryl Stansbury's son Lucas. Cheryl's will left custody of Lucas to Bobbie Spencer and Dr. Tony Jones. As their marriage fell apart over the adoption dilemma, Sean began an affair with lawyer Jessica Holmes. In the meantime, Tiffany was thrilled when she discovered she was pregnant. She was crushed just as quickly when she overheard Jessica tell Sean she is pregnant as well. Tiffany miscarried her child and at the same time, Jessica admits to Sean she had lied and was not really pregnant. Sean and Tiffany started to work on reconciling their marriage, just as Jessica learned she really was pregnant. Jessica threatened to tell Tiffany. Sean threatened her in response, warning her to keep her mouth shut. Jessica was later found dead and Sean, thinking Tiffany committed the crime, confessed to the murder. However, it was later proven the insane Ryan Chamberlain was the real murderer. Sean and Tiffany were in the clear.

In 1994, Sean and Luke were caught up in a shootout with mobster Frank Smith. Sean was shot and wounded by Frank Smith as Sean was trying to arrest Frank in a cemetery. Luke then appeared from behind a large mausoleum, confronted Frank, and shot him dead. Sean recovered from his wound and resumed his duties as Port Charles's police commissioner. A few months later, Sean and Luke were lured to a dark alley in Port Charles by evil mobster Joe Scully, who was trying to take over Frank Smith's criminal empire. Luke and Sean enter the alley from different ends, each unaware that the other was there. A hitman hired by Scully was hiding in the alley and tried to shoot Luke. Luke shot back and killed the hitman, but one of the Luke's bullets struck Sean, wounding him seriously. Luke called for an ambulance for Sean. Luke apologized to Sean at the hospital. Sean gave a statement to the police clearing Luke of any criminal intent in shooting him. Before Sean was sent off to heal and recuperate, an overjoyed Tiffany announced to their friends and family she was pregnant. When General Hospital recommended they transfer him to another treatment facility in Boston, Massachusetts, Sean and Tiffany decided to leave town to get Sean the best care possible and start a new life with their child.

In 2008, Sean and Tiffany appeared to Robert while he was in a coma, battling colon cancer.

In 2013, Sean was seen again, living in Ireland with his family, and it was revealed that he has radiation poisoning, just like Luke, after being shot by associates of The Balkan. Sean was very weak from the poison and required the use of a wheel chair. He implored Luke to track down Jerry Jacks and get the antidote for both of them before time ran out. With Tracy's help, Luke found Jerry and the antidote and sent a dose of the cure to Sean.

In 2021, Tiffany called Anna and told her that Sean had just died.

== Tiffany Donely ==
Tiffany Hill Donely
- General Hospital character
- Portrayed by: Sharon Wyatt
- Duration: 1981–1984; 1986–1995; 2008; 2021
- First appearance: July 14, 1981
- Last appearance: May 21, 2021
- Created by: Pat Falken Smith; Margaret DePriest
- Introduced by: Gloria Monty (1981, 1986); Lisa de Cazotte (2008); Frank Valentini (2021)
- Book appearances: Robin's Diary
- Spin-off appearances: General Hospital: Night Shift
In-universe information
- Other names: Elsie Mae Crumholtz
- Occupation: Actress television executive
- Siblings: Cheryl Stansbury
- Spouse: Sean Donely (1988–2021)
- Children: Anna Donely
- Stepchildren: Connor Olivera
- Nieces and nephews: Lucas Jones

Tiffany Donely (born Elsie Mae Crumholz; previously Hill) was a fictional character on the popular ABC soap opera General Hospital. She was portrayed by actress Sharon Wyatt from July 14, 1981, to July 10, 1984, from July 30, 1986, to February 24, 1995, and again on May 21, 2021. Tiffany was married to Sean Donely till his death in May 2021 and the characters made a special appearance on October 13–14, 2008 on the two-part Season 2 finale of the General Hospital spin off General Hospital: Night Shift. Wyatt was nominated for the Daytime Emmy Award for Outstanding Supporting Actress in a Drama Series in 1994.

=== Storylines ===
When Luke Spencer and Robert Scorpio traveled to Cassadine Island located off the coast of Venezuela to stop Mikkos Cassadine from freezing the world they met a girl named Tiffany Hill. Tiffany was a beautiful B-movie actress and was involved with Mikkos' brother Victor Cassadine. She had once been involved with Victor's brother, Tony, causing animosity between her and Tony's girlfriend, Alexandria Quartermaine. After hearing of Mikkos' plans and realizing how mad Mikkos and the other Cassadines were, Tiffany helped Luke and Robert break into his command center. Luke and Robert were then able to destroy the weather machine and kill Mikkos in the process. Tiffany left Greece and returned to Port Charles, with her new friends Luke and Robert, just in time to be a witness to the beautiful wedding of Luke and Laura Spencer. Tiffany formed a close bond and friendship with Luke's new wife Laura Spencer. Several years down the line, when Laura's daughter Lulu Spencer was born, Laura asked her good friend Tiffany to be Lulu's godmother.

Tiffany's romantic relationship with Robert had sizzled while they were on the Cassadine Island and continued when she settled in Port Charles after her career stalled. After investing in Luke's yacht, "The Haunted Star", Tiffany noticed that Robert wasn't as interested in her anymore, and their romance slowly petered out with him admitting to her that he was falling in love with reporter Jackie Templeton who had been helping the three try to find the missing Laura Spencer while they aided her in helping to find her sister, also named Laura. Eventually, Tiffany rented a luxurious apartment in Port Charles' high rent district, moving in with Jackie and Laura, free from the spell of the evil David Gray who had been behind Laura Spencer's kidnapping. Tiffany's flirtatious manner created a friendship between her and wealthy Edward Quartermaine that was purely platonic but often saw them in cahoots together, and she was the subject of a teenage crush from former waterfront hood Blackie Parrish who was hanging around and working at the Haunted Star.

After a couple months of being in Port Charles, Tiffany caught the eye of Dr. Noah Drake. Noah had previously been involved with Bobbie Spencer, but couldn't bring himself to commit to her, so Bobbie left town for a while. With Bobbie gone, Noah began to pursue Tiffany, however when Bobbie returned, Noah opted to resume his relationship with her and stopped his pursuit of Tiffany. When the romance between Noah and Bobbie failed once again, Noah again turned to Tiffany. Just as Noah and Tiffany were about to sleep together, Tiffany realizes that she doesn't want to be with him and breaks things off which ultimately led to Noah leaving town. Tiffany then began working for the Quartermaines following the murder of Alan Quartermaine. Sean Donely, who had been having an affair with Alan's wife, Monica Quartermaine behind Alan's back, was the prime suspect in the murder. Afraid that he would be sent to prison, Sean stopped seeing Monica and had just started to pursue Tiffany when the police arrested him for murder. Alan's father, Edward Quartermaine made a deal with Sean to have the murder charges dropped if he returned the money he had stolen while involved with Monica. When Alan miraculously came back from the dead, Sean moved on from Monica and began a relationship with Tiffany. Tiffany began working for the television station WLPC as an executive and gave Colton Shore his own show called The Colton Connection.

In 1988, Sean and Tiffany finally married in the Quartermaine mansion. During the wedding ceremony, Tiffany's real name came out: Elsie Mae Crumholz. Sometime after the wedding, the Cartel began working in Port Charles, and they poisoned Tiffany in order to blackmail Sean into giving them information on Robert's investigation into the Cartel. The Cartel's evil plans eventually fell apart and Tony Jones was able to cure Tiffany's illness. When Tiffany's sister Cheryl Stansbury died in a car accident, Sean and Tiffany went to Phoenix to get Cheryl's baby son Lucas. Lucas had been adopted by Bobbie, after Cheryl was told that her baby died. When Bobbie discovered that Lucas was actually Cheryl's son and the baby hadn't died, she kept quiet about it, so that she could keep him. Cheryl eventually found out the truth and got Lucas back, however Cheryl left Lucas to Bobbie and Tony in her will, under the assumption that Tiffany didn't want children. This infuriated Tiffany and she took Bobbie to court to gain custody of Lucas.

The custody battle for Lucas wreaked havoc on Sean and Tiffany's marriage. Tiffany tried to fight dirty by telling the social worker about Bobbie's past as a prostitute, but Sean refused to testify if Tiffany brought it up at the custody hearing. Despite Sean's protestations, Tiffany's lawyers used to ammo, but Tiffany lost the case anyway and Lucas was given to Bobbie and Tony. Sean and Tiffany grew further apart and the distance between them only widened when Sean began having an affair with lawyer Jessica Holmes. When Tiffany discovered that she was pregnant with Sean's child, Sean decided to fight for her and get her back. Jessica tried to stop him by claiming to be pregnant as well, but Sean returned to Tiffany anyway. Things took a turn for the worse when Tiffany found out that Sean might have gotten Jessica pregnant as well. She went into premature labor and her baby died. Devastated, Tiffany nearly committed suicide but Bobbie and Tony arrived in time to stop her. Jessica later retracted her pregnancy claim even though she found out later on that she actually was pregnant with Sean's child. When Jessica was murdered, Sean confessed to protect Tiffany because he thought she had killed Jessica. Felicia Jones and Mac Scorpio came to the rescue with proof that psycho Ryan Chamberlain was the murderer. In the clear, Sean and Tiffany were now able to begin to repair their broken relationship.

When Luke shot Sean and badly wounded him during a shootout with mobster Frank Smith, General Hospital recommended that they transfer him to another treatment facility in Boston, Massachusetts. Tiffany discovered she was pregnant again just before the pair left town in 1995. It is later revealed that they had a daughter and named her Anna (nicknamed Annie) after their good friend Anna.

Sean and Tiffany returned to Port Charles in 2008 (on General Hospital: Night Shift) to help their friend Robert, who was battling colon cancer.

In 2013, it was mentioned that Tiffany was currently in London, looking for a cure for Polonium 210, after Sean was infected by a bullet laced with it.

In 2021, Tiffany calls Anna and tells her that Sean had just died. Anna, Robert, Robin, Mac, Felicia, Monica, and Laura fly to Ireland to be with Tiffany and Annie during the funeral. Tiffany later calls Annie and congratulates her on passing the final test to become a WSB agent.

== David Gray ==
David Gray
- General Hospital character
- Portrayed by: Paul Rosilli
- Duration: 1981–82
- First appearance: 1981
- Last appearance: June 18, 1982

David Gray is a fictional character on ABC's daytime drama General Hospital

David Gray came to Port Charles to steal the Treasures of Malluth exhibited in the Port Charles Museum. However, the treasures belonged to the Prince of Malkuth. However the Ambassador of Malkuth was in charge of them at the museum. In one of the final episodes in which the character appears, he reveals that he is the second son of the king of Malkuth; he was spirited away as a child because the cult recognized him as the true heir of Malkuth. Taking possession of the sword and helmet would make him the heir. He wanted to regain his power and leadership of Malkuth by stealing both the helmet and the sword of Malkuth. David Gray had a lacky named Mel. Mel was dating Laura Templeton in which David had worried Laura knew too much of his plan. David decided to hypnotize Laura Templeton in order to keep her in line. What David did not realize at the time was that Mel was also involved with Laura Spencer. Mel was photographing Laura for the Miss Star Eyes campaign. In which then David had realized he was following the wrong Laura and eventually hypnotized Laura Spencer. Since they were on the docks at that time, David sent Laura out to sea on a boat where she was presumed dead for a while. The Cassadines kidnapped her at sea and faked her death. It was thought Laura drowned at sea. Laura's husband Luke Spencer wanted revenge on David Gray. David Gray was eventually killed when he fell out of a museum window after being confronted by Luke with the Malkuth sword.

== Simone Hardy ==
Simone Hardy
- General Hospital character
- Portrayed by: Laura Carrington (1987–89); Stephanie E. Williams (1990–93); Felecia M. Bell (1993–96)
- Duration: 1987–1996
- First appearance: June 1, 1987
- Last appearance: July 18, 1996
- Introduced by: H. Wesley Kenney
- Book appearances: Robin's Diary
In-universe information
- Occupation: Pediatrician
- Family: Hardy
- Parents: Carlson Ravelle; Pauline Ravelle
- Spouse: Tom Hardy (1988–95)
- Children: Tommy Hardy

Simone Hardy is a fictional character from the ABC Daytime soap opera General Hospital. The role was originated by Laura Carrington on June 1, 1987, and she remained in the role until the character was taken off-screen on December 22, 1989. Stephanie Williams took over the role of Simone on February 16, 1990, and remained on the series until March 30, 1993. Felecia Bell entered the role on December 20, 1993, until the character left the series in 1996. An unnamed actress played Simone when she was first seen from behind on May 13, 1987.

Simone is first seen in New York City, having an on-again/off-again relationship with Tom Hardy. She fears they will be never be happy since she feels her socialite parents will never accept an interracial relationship. Simone arrives in Port Charles when Dr. Steve Hardy hires her at General Hospital. He does not know that his son Tom Hardy and Simone had previously dated. When Tom returns from medical school, they resume their relationship and marry in 1988 (daytime's first interracial marriage). In the fall of 1987, she had a brief affair with Andy Matthews and finds out she is pregnant in the beginning of 1988. After confirming that the baby is Tom's, Simone miscarries during an altercation with a racist patient and leaves on a world cruise with her mother. Tom and Simone reconcile when she returns, but separate again in 1989 and Simone has an affair with Dr. Harrison Davis. Simone becomes pregnant but does not know who the father is. She confides in her mother-in-law, Audrey March Hardy. Simone names the boy after his father, and he is known as Tommy. She has a paternity test that reveals that Harrison is the father, but it has been tampered with by Simone's mother, Pauline Ravelle. Simone leaves town with her son to help orphans in Romania. When they return, Tom moves back in with them. Tom later leaves Port Charles to help with a relief effort in Somalia. In 1993, Simone decides to run for City Council. Justus Ward runs against her and is attracted to her. Justus wins, meanwhile they become close. Tom returns from Africa and wants to bring Tom Jr. and Simone back with him. Simone refuses and they divorce. Simone dates Justus Ward and they become engaged. Simone ends the engagement when she realizes that Tom Jr. will never accept it. She leaves town with her son.

== Tommy Hardy ==
Tommy Hardy
- General Hospital character
- Portrayed by: Catherine and Noelle Paige (1989–92); Christian Michel and Jean-Paul Rene Piette (1992–93); Zachary Ellington Jr. (1994–97)
- Duration: 1989–97
- First appearance: November 16, 1989
- Last appearance: 1997
- Created by: Gene Palumbo
- Introduced by: H. Wesley Kenney
In-universe information
- Other names: Thomas Steven Hardy Jr
- Occupation: Doctor
- Family: Hardy
- Parents: Tom Hardy; Simone Ravelle Hardy
- Grandparents: Audrey Hardy; Tom Baldwin Sr. Steve Hardy (adoptive); Carlson Ravelle; Pauline Ravelle
- Aunts and uncles: Lee Baldwin; Jeff Webber (adoptive)
- First cousins: Scott Baldwin (adoptive); Steve Webber; Sarah Webber; Elizabeth Webber; Hayden Barnes

Tommy Hardy is a fictional character on the ABC soap opera General Hospital. He is the son of Dr. Tom Hardy and Dr. Simone Ravelle Hardy. He is also the grandson of the late Dr. Steve Hardy and retired nurse Audrey March Hardy.

On April 2, 2013, his cousin Elizabeth Webber mentioned that Tommy had just graduated from medical school.

== Peter Harrell ==
Peter Harrell
- General Hospital character
- Portrayed by: Judson Scott (1984–85); David Gautreaux (2014)
- Duration: 1984–85; 2014
- First appearance: October 31, 1984
- Last appearance: September 15, 2014
- Created by: Anne Howard Bailey
- Introduced by: Gloria Monty (1984); Frank Valentini (2014)
In-universe information
- Brothers: Prescott Harrell
- Sons: Peter Harrell Jr.

Peter Harrell is the scheming fiancé of Felicia Cummings (Kristina Wagner). The role was originated by Judson Scott in 1984. Scott's character was killed off in the spring of 1985 and the series introduced his brother, Prescott played by Robert Newman throughout the summer of 1985. In 2014, the series introduced the character of Levi Dunkleman played by Zachary Garred who is eventually revealed to be Peter's son. On September 12, 2014, David Gautreaux stepped into the role as a recast of Peter Harrell Sr.

Felicia confides in Frisco Jones (Jack Wagner) about her Aztec heritage and reveals a family heirloom was stolen during her birthday party; Felicia's fiancé, Peter Harrell was one of the guests. Luke Spencer (Anthony Geary) shows up on Sean Donely (John Reilly)'s doorstep in Mexico where he meets with Peter and they set out to track down the men who have stolen Felicia's scepter and the two end up separated. When Luke is falsely accused of killing one of the thieves, he learns from Felicia's grandmother, Mariah that Peter has been giving her false information. Luke's partner Robert Scorpio (Tristan Rogers) discovers Peter was in town at the time of the murder. Peter is working with Donely's assistant Cruz who tells him that his plan to frame Luke for murder has failed. It is eventually revealed Peter is behind the plot to steal Felicia's ring and scepter because it is the key to finding the legendary Aztec treasure. Spencer and Scorpio track the statue with clues to the treasures location to a museum where Peter and Cruz try to stall them. However, Peter gets arrested for tampering with the statue. Peter manages to get released and together he and Cruz confront Luke and Robert before escaping into the jungle. Peter kills Cruz when he learns she is working for Donely who is also after the treasure and they start working together. Peter lures Felicia to Mexico on Sean's orders and gets her drunk to get her ring before taking her to the waterfall where the treasure is hidden. Felicia ditches the ring to distract him and tries to escape. Peter recovers the ring and hands it over to Sean who pairs it with the scepter which opens a door to a staircase where they struggle with Spencer and Scorpio. Sean is wounded and Peter is shot by the police and presumed dead when he falls into the waterfall. With Peter's body missing, Sean's part in the scheme remains secret.

Peter, very much alive vows revenge on Donely for orchestrating the heist. Peter makes his way to Port Charles where he tries to steal the treasure from Donely's warehouse and gets stabbed by Donely's henchman, Jack Slater. Peter calls Felicia for help and they meet at the old Pullman car where he passes out from his wound. Felicia calls Frisco's brother, Dr. Tony Jones (Brad Maule) for help. Peter escapes after Slater shoots Tony. With everyone searching for him, Peter skips town for Canada and then hops on a plane to Brazil in March 1985. Both Donely and Slater travel to Brazil to find Peter. On May 31, 1985, Peter's brother, Prescott (Robert Newman) informs Slater of Peter's death in Brazil.

In September 2014, Frisco and Felicia's daughter Maxie (Kirsten Storms) discovers Peter (David Gautreaux) alive at a clinic and he initially mistakes her for Felicia. His son explains after he was left for dead, Peter eventually made a life for himself, and started a family only for the bullet left inside him to leave him confined to a hospital bed. After Junior explains who Maxie is, Peter declares she must die. Before Peter can kill Maxie, he is shot in the back by Nathan (Ryan Paevey).

== Jimmy Lee Holt ==
Jimmy Lee Holt
- General Hospital character
- Portrayed by: Steve Bond
- Duration: 1983–1986
- First appearance: January 4, 1983
- Last appearance: December 31, 1986
- Created by: Anne Howard Bailey (Note: The character's scripting as the illegitimate son of Edward Quartermaine was shown in the spring of 1982 under executive producer Gloria Monty and head writers John William Corrington and Joyce Hooper Corrington However, the character was further developed by head writer Anne Howard Bailey and first appeared in 1983.)
- Introduced by: Gloria Monty
In-universe information
- Other names: Eric Quartermaine
- Occupation: Country storekeeper
- Family: Quartermaine
- Father: Edward Quartermaine
- Mother: Beatrice LeSeur
- Adoptive parents: Wayne Holt; Cora Holt
- Stepmother: Lila Quartermaine
- Half-brothers: Bradley Ward; Alan Quartermaine
- Half-sisters: Tracy Quartermaine
- Spouse: Celia Quartermaine (1985–86); Charity Gatlin (1986–2021)
- Sons: Austin Gatlin-Holt
- Stepsons: Jonah Gatlin (1986–2021)
- Grandparents: George Quartermaine; Ida Zemlock
- Nephews: A. J. Quartermaine; Jason Morgan; Ned Quartermaine; Justus Ward; Dillon Quartermaine
- Nieces: Skye Quartermaine (adoptive); Emily Quartermaine (adoptive); Faith Ward
- First cousins: Alexandria Quartermaine

Jimmy Lee Holt is the illegitimate son of Edward Quartermaine and Beatrice LeSeur, portrayed by Steve Bond from 1983 to 1987. Jimmy Lee, who Edward Quartermaine believed to have been in Europe in boarding school, was raised by distant relatives of his mother Beatrice's, and showed up in Port Charles in January 1983 just as the Quartermaine family was facing the crisis of Lila Quartermaine's first husband, Crane Tolliver, giving Susan Moore papers which proved his marriage had never been legally ended. Jimmy Lee ended up with the papers when Crane was killed after murdering Susan Moore, and used this as leverage over his father. Not willing to shed his blue collar career for an executive one at ELQ, Jimmy Lee worked at various construction jobs, but fell in love with his distant cousin, Celia, who was engaged to the handsome but stuffy Dr. Grant Putnam. Celia secretly fell in love with Jimmy Lee too, but after only sharing kisses with him, he kidnapped her and held her overnight right before she was to marry Grant. She showed up at the wedding after hitching a ride on a chicken truck, and Jimmy Lee moved on by briefly dating both Heather Webber and Shirley Pickett. After an affair with Lorena Sharpe (Monica Quartermaine's cousin), he continued to remain a thorn in Grant and Celia's side, and in 1984, when his mother Beatrice showed up in town, continued to use the Tolliver divorce papers against Edward.

Beatrice was accidentally killed by mistakenly drinking Lila Quartermaine's heart medicine, and this left Jimmy Lee bitter towards the Quartermaines, whom he felt had treated her badly. After Grant and Celia's marriage fell apart, Jimmy Lee married her, but old enemies of his made it appear soon afterwards he cheated on her, and she left town, not accepting his explanation. After his half brother Alan Quartermaine came back from the dead, Jimmy Lee met and fell in love with Charity Gatlin, the woman who had taken Alan in. Jimmy Lee and Charity married, and left Port Charles. Over the years, Jimmy Lee would infrequently be mentioned, most notably when Edward used his illegitimate son's name as an alias while hiding from his enemies. In 2021, Jimmy and Charity's son, Austin, shows up in Port Charles, and reveals Jimmy died six months prior.

== Victor Jerome ==
Victor Jerome
- General Hospital character
- Portrayed by: Jack Axelrod
- Duration: 1987–89
- First appearance: April 27, 1987
- Last appearance: October 20, 1989
- Created by: Ann Marcus; Norma Monty
- Introduced by: H. Wesley Kenney
In-universe information
- Occupation: Mob boss
- Family: Jerome
- Sons: Dino Antoinelli; Evan Jerome; Julian Jerome
- Daughters: Olivia St. John; Ava Jerome
- Grandsons: Evan Jerome Jr.; Lucas Jones; Leo Falconeri; Andrew Nero
- Granddaughters: Sam McCall; Kiki Jerome; Avery Corinthos
- Other relatives: Danny Morgan; Jonathan Lawrence

Victor Jerome is a fictional character from the ABC Daytime drama, General Hospital. The role was originated by Jack Axelrod on April 27, 1987. Axelrod made his final appearance as Victor on October 20, 1989.

Victor is introduced in the spring of 1987 as the father of the late Evan Jerome, and rival to the late mob boss Angus McKay (Guy Doleman). When Angus's children, Duke Lavery (Ian Buchanan) and Camellia McKay (Elizabeth Keifer) are acquitted for Evan's murder, Evan's widow, Veronica (Robin Millan) puts a hit out on Camellia. However, Victor calls off the hit and banishes Veronica to Europe. When his wife Anna (Finola Hughes) is kidnapped by Grant Putnam (Brian Patrick Clarke), Duke is forced to turn to Victor for help. However, when Victor refuses, Julian (Jason Culp) decides to help despite his father's disapproval. When Julian takes a bullet meant for Duke, a distraught Victor decides to hold Duke to the deathbed promise he made to Julian, to legitimize the mob. Meanwhile, Victor's daughter, Olivia (Tonja Walker) arrives in Port Charles and immediately causes trouble when it is revealed she put the hit on Julian. In October 1988, it is revealed that Victor and Julian agreed to fake his death to throw Olivia off. When Olivia is shot and left in a coma, Anna is believed to be the prime suspect. When Duke threatens to kill Julian unless he helps clear Anna's name, Victor is worried. However, it is soon revealed that the actual shooter is Victor's oldest and illegitimate son, Dino Antoinelli (Chris DeRose) with his longtime mistress, Dimitra (Linda Cristal). In the meantime, Victor becomes infatuated with Lucy Coe (Lynn Herring). He becomes her secret admirer sending her flowers and love letters. Victor escapes prison and pledges his love for Lucy on the docks. When Lucy rejects Victor, he is so shocked that he swallows a heart shaped pendant, that he made especially for Lucy. With help from Alan Quartermaine (Stuart Damon), Lucy dumps Victor's body in the lake. However, Victor's corpse washes ashore and is discovered by Anna's daughter, Robin (Kimberly McCullough) and her friend Rowdy on Halloween in 1989. After Victor's death, it is revealed that Cheryl gave birth to Julian's son Lucas Jones and Victor arranged to have Cheryl think the boy is stillborn. In 1990, a man by the name of Eric "Edge" Jackson pretends to be Victor's grandson, Evan Jerome Jr. to get his hands on Victor's diamonds. However, his scheme is eventually exposed and he leaves town.

== Felicia Scorpio ==
Felicia Scorpio
- General Hospital character
- Portrayed by: Kristina Wagner (1984–2005, 2007–present); Sandra Ferguson (2005)
- Duration: 1984–2005; 2007–2008; 2012–present
- First appearance: September 7, 1984
- Created by: Anne Howard Bailey
- Introduced by: Gloria Monty (1984); Wendy Riche (1998); Jill Farren Phelps (2007); Frank Valentini (2012)
- Book appearances: Robin's Diary
- Spin-off appearances: Port Charles
In-universe information
- Other names: Felicia Scorpio-Jones; Felicia Cummings; Helen Jones; Carla
- Occupation: Interior Designer; WSB Agent; Writer; Entrepreneur; Private investigator; Warehouse manager; Princess of Aztec nobility
- Family: Scorpio/Jones family
- Parents: Peter Cummings; Bertha Ramirez
- Spouse: Frisco Jones (1986–1992); Colton Shore (1989); Mac Scorpio (1998–2001, 2013–present)
- Sons: Cody Bell (step)
- Daughters: Maxie Jones; Georgie Jones
- Grandsons: James West
- Granddaughters: Georgie Spinelli; Bailey Jones
- Grandparents: Maximilian Ramirez; Mariah Ramirez
- Other relatives: Amelia Ramirez; George; Johanna; Lettie

Felicia Scorpio is a fictional character on the ABC soap opera, General Hospital. The role was originated and portrayed by Kristina Wagner on and off since September 1984. When Wagner and ABC couldn't come to terms during an important storyline involving Felicia's daughter, Maxie Jones (Kirsten Storms), soap vet Sandra Ferguson took over the role from June to November 2005 in what was a shocking recast at the time. Felicia is one-half of the Frisco and Felicia supercouple of the 1980s and 1990s.

Wagner, then known as Kristina Malandro, debuted in the role on September 7, 1984. In March 2003, it was announced that Wagner would be parting ways with the show, she last aired February 13, 2003, with little fanfare.

In January 2004, nearly a year after her initial departure, it was revealed that Wagner would be returning to the show as Felicia. Wagner made her return on March 1, 2004. In May 2005, it was announced that Wagner would once again be leaving the show and former Another World actress Sandra Ferguson would take over in the role. Wagner departed on June 8, 2005, with Ferguson taking the rein on June 9, 2005. Ferguson would only last in the role of Felicia for 13 episodes, making her last airdate be on November 15, 2005, after being dropped from the canvas. In December 2007, it was announced that Wagner would briefly return to the show to help facilitate the exit of Lindze Letherman, who plays Felicia's daughter, Georgie Jones. Wagner aired from December 20, 2007, to January 22, 2008.

In March 2012, Daytime Confidential revealed that Wagner will be returning to the soap, she began airing on April 27, 2012.

In 2023, Charlie Mason from Soaps She Knows placed Felicia at #20 on his ranked list of General Hospital’s 40+ Greatest Characters of All Time, commenting "Really, this long-running heroine should have her own action figure, because from the moment that we met her — when she was unconvincingly disguised as a boy, no less! — she’s been tossed from one madcap adventure to the next.:

Felicia Cummings arrived in Port Charles on September 7, 1984, intent on getting back an Aztec heirloom ring that Frisco Jones had purchased. Frisco discovers the Aztec princess under his bed and when she breaks her leg trying to escape, he nurses her back to health and protects her from the henchmen who are also after the ring. It is during this time, with their constant bickering fueled by a growing attraction, that Felicia and Frisco fall in love despite her having a fiancé, Peter Harrell, back in Texas at the time. In the quest for the Aztec treasure, Frisco and Felicia, along with Robert Scorpio and his wife Holly Sutton join Sean Donely and Luke Spencer for a Mexican Adventure, later congregating back at Mariah Ramirez (June Lockhart) Felicia's grandmother's hacienda in Texas where Luke's wife, Laura Spencer, had been staying.

By mid 1985, having survived a serious break-up, Frisco and Felicia move in together, sharing a tiny studio apartment at Bobbie Spencer's Brownstone. Following the arrival of Robin Scorpio, Felicia helps Robert and Anna Devane with their young daughter and stands by her man when Frisco goes undercover in the Asian Quarter to help Robert stop Mr. Wu's reign of terror with help from Sean Donely. The undercover work motivates Frisco to enroll in the Police Academy shortly after he and Felicia get engaged in December 1985.

On June 20, 1986, after having cancelled their wedding in a panic after her future husband was grazed by a bullet during a hostage situation, Felicia Cummings marries Frisco Jones on his birthday. Later that summer, when she is framed for grand theft, Frisco and Felicia go on the run eluding several mob hit attempts as they travel from New York City to Cincinnati, to Atlantic City, and later hide out at the circus before returning to Port Charles where Frisco is intent on clearing his wife's name, is instrumental in the take-down of mob boss, Mr. Big, and is promptly promoted to Detective.

In June 1987, Frisco joins the World Service Bureau (WSB), returning for one night early that December to spend time with his wife before going back into service, and is later declared missing and presumed dead in 1988.

After a period of mourning, Felicia attempts to move on and rebounds into a relationship with Lucy Coe's cousin, Colton Shore. It is revealed that Colton had been involuntarily involved in the attack that left Frisco for dead. In June 1989, Frisco turns up alive just in time to see Felicia marrying the man who had been programmed to kill him. Felicia is initially reluctant to choose between Frisco and Colton, but inevitably reunites with her first love on Halloween 1989 and the couple subsequently remarry on January 26, 1990. Afterwards, they go to Europe on their honeymoon/Frisco's concert tour which, unknown to Felicia, is also a cover for Frisco who had been lured back into WSB service after being warned that his loved ones were in danger. While in Paris, Felicia is kidnapped by ex-DVX boss, Cesar Faison, but is rescued by Frisco and Sean. Later, after accidentally overhearing Frisco talking about rejoining the WSB, Felicia, having just learned that she's pregnant, runs away to her grandmother's hacienda in Texas. However, upon hearing that Frisco was hurt during a shooting, she returns to Port Charles. Frisco and Felicia are reunited once again and, after a premature labor scare, joyously welcome their daughter Maxie Jones together on Halloween 1990.

A year later Frisco, Felicia, and Maxie move back to her family's hacienda in Texas. Felicia is constantly worried about the danger that her husband faces and eventually divorces Frisco. She becomes involved with the unstable Dr. Ryan Chamberlain. When Felicia witnesses Ryan murder his wife Gloria, she develops amnesia but manages to make her way back to Port Charles, leaving Maxie in Texas with her grandmother. In Port Charles, Mac Scorpio and Sean try to protect her from Ryan. Ryan has her committed to an insane asylum, but Mac helps her escape. Mac and Felicia then go on the run together and eventually fall in love. They almost marry in 1994, but the wedding is called off after Ryan crashes the ceremony with a bomb. After dealing with Ryan, Mac and Felicia once again try to marry, but Maxie then becomes ill with Kawasaki syndrome. Mac Scorpio tracks Frisco down on assignment in Somalia and brings him back to Port Charles. Upon seeing her father, Maxie rapidly recovers from pneumonia and becomes well enough for a transplant. In a tragic twist of fate, she eventually receives a new heart from her cousin B.J. Jones after the little girl is killed in a school bus accident. Frisco and Felicia celebrate their daughter's recovery by making love and after Frisco leaves, Felicia discovers that she is pregnant once again. On March 7, 1995, Felicia gives birth to their second daughter on the floor of Luke's club. The baby girl is named Georgie Jones by her sister, Maxie. Frisco comes home in May 1995 to spend time with his girls and expresses a desire to stay home and be a full-time Dad, but Felicia encourages him to go back to saving the world until he's ready to give up the work for good.

Later in 1995, Felicia becomes involved with Dr. Tom Hardy. She becomes the victim of another stalker and initially suspects Tom, but it is revealed to be Kevin Collins, suffering from a nervous breakdown. The strain on Tom and Felicia's relationship increases and eventually they separate and Tom returns to Africa. Felicia moves on and resumes her relationship with Mac, and in 1998 they are finally married.

In 1999, Felicia is given the task of writing Lila Quartermaine's memoirs by Lila's grandson Ned Ashton. Felicia uses the commission to go on several adventures with Luke Spencer. While on an adventure, Felicia is kidnapped by the presumed dead Cesar Faison. She is rescued but still has strong feelings for Luke. In 2000, Mac and Felicia's marriage begins to fall apart when Mac starts to suspect that Felicia is having an affair with Luke. Luke is later arrested and tried for Stefan Cassadine's murder, and Felicia is his alibi, confessing that she and Luke were having sex on the night in question. This is the last straw for and Mac and Luke's wife Laura Spencer, and they both file for divorce. Felicia later falls in love with Luke and professes her love to him, but Luke confesses that he is still in love with his estranged wife Laura.

After Mac is hurt in the Port Charles Hotel fire in 2004, Felicia returns to Port Charles, determined to rebuild her family. Even though they are divorced, Mac and Felicia reconcile and together they move back into the Scorpio home with Maxie and Georgie.

In 2007, a devastated Felicia returns to Port Charles to attend her youngest daughter Georgie's funeral after she is killed by the Text Message Killer. While in town she tells Maxie that she was with their father Frisco and Georgie had tried to stay in contact with her through letters. During Georgie's funeral, Maxie angrily lashes out on Felicia for being absent from her and Georgie's lives. She berates Felicia for abandoning them and tells her to leave the funeral. Felicia tries to mend fences with Maxie, but Maxie still continues to hold a grudge against her mother. After the funeral, Felicia initially decides to stay in Port Charles to help Mac and the PCPD catch the man who murdered her daughter, but eventually leaves again and returns to Texas.

Felicia once again returns to Port Charles on April 27, 2012, to help Maxie cope with personal and legal troubles stemming from Robin's apparent death and the murder of Dr. Lisa Niles. Felicia and Mac, who is now working as The Floating Rib's bartender, rekindle their relationship.

On February 4, 2013, Felicia is shocked to find that Frisco has returned unannounced to Port Charles, and the two share a poignant reunion at The Floating Rib. Felicia has a difficult decision in choosing between Mac and Frisco. Frisco later proposes at the Nurses Ball, but Felicia tells him that her heart belongs to Mac and a dejected Frisco leaves shortly after. Felicia proposes to Mac the same night, and they married on August 16, 2013.

== Frisco Jones ==
Frisco Jones
- General Hospital character
- Portrayed by: Jack Wagner (1984–2013); Kevin Bernhardt (temp. 1984)
- Duration: 1984–91; 1994–95; 2013
- First appearance: January 27, 1984
- Last appearance: April 8, 2013
- Created by: Anne Howard Bailey; Gloria Monty; Norma Monty
- Introduced by: Gloria Monty; Wendy Riche (1994); Frank Valentini (2013)
- Book appearances: Robin's Diary
In-universe information
- Other names: Andrew Jones Jr Frisco Jones
- Occupation: Head of the WSB: WSB agent; Police Detective; performer at Duke's Club
- Family: Jones
- Parents: Andrew Jones; Cindy Jones
- Siblings: Tony Jones
- Spouse: Felicia Jones (1986–92)
- Children: Maxie Jones; Georgie Jones
- Grandchildren: Georgie Spinelli; James West; Louise Jones
- Nieces and nephews: B. J. Jones; Lucas Jones (adoptive)
- Other relatives: Nathan West (son-in-law); Robin Scorpio-Drake (goddaughter)

Andrew "Frisco" Jones Jr. is a fictional character on the ABC soap opera, General Hospital. He has been portrayed by Jack Wagner on and off from January 27, 1984, to September 9, 1988; June 5, 1989, to June 11, 1991; May 3 to 25, 1994, April 28 to May 17, 1995, and again from February 4, 2013, to April 8, 2013. Frisco is one-half of the Frisco and Felicia supercouple of the 1980s and 1990s. Wagner was nominated for the Daytime Emmy Award for Outstanding Younger Actor in a Drama Series in 1985. In 2023, Charlie Mason from Soaps She Knows placed Frisco at #9 on his ranked list of General Hospital’s 40+ Greatest Characters of All Time, commenting that "When Jack Wagner’s crime-fighting pop star sang, “You’re aaall III neeed,” few and far between were the audience members who didn’t wish that he was singing to them. Even now, years after Frisco burned his bridges in Port Charles, we’re dying for him to cross back over them and give us an encore."

Frisco arrived in Port Charles in 1984 when he is hired as the lead singer for "Blackie and the Riff Raff." He becomes friends with fellow band member Blackie Parrish and the two move in together at the Port Charles Hotel. The band breaks up when Blackie is sent to prison, and Frisco lands in the hospital after getting beaten up for quitting the music business. When Frisco's vocal chords are temporarily damaged, he is assigned a speech therapist, Tania Roskov, with whom he has a brief flirtation before losing interest upon the arrival of Felicia Cummings. Tania eventually falls in love with, and marries, Frisco's brother, Tony Jones.

Felicia Cummings arrived in Port Charles on September 7, 1984, intent on getting back an Aztec heirloom ring that Frisco had purchased. Frisco discovers the Aztec princess under his bed and when she breaks her leg trying to escape, he nurses her back to health and protects her from the henchmen who are also after the ring. It is during this time, with their constant bickering fueled by a growing attraction, that Felicia and Frisco fall in love despite her having a fiancé, Peter Harrell, back in Texas at the time. In the quest for the Aztec treasure, Frisco and Felicia, along with Robert Scorpio and his wife Holly Sutton join Sean Donely and Luke Spencer for a Mexican Adventure, later congregating back at Felicia's grandmother's hacienda in Texas where Luke's wife, Laura Spencer, had been staying.

By mid 1985, having survived a serious break-up, Frisco and Felicia move in together, sharing a tiny studio apartment at Bobbie Spencer's Brownstone. Following the arrival and kidnapping of Robin Scorpio and the murder of his best friend, Josh Clayton, Frisco goes undercover in the Asian Quarter to help Robert stop Mr. Wu's reign of terror with help from Sean Donely. The undercover work motivates Frisco to enroll in the Police Academy shortly after he and Felicia get engaged in December 1985.

During his time at the Police Academy, Cadet Jones gets involved in the brownstone murder investigation, and along with Co-Chief of Police Anna Devane help crack the Laurelton murder mystery. Not long after, on June 20, 1986, Frisco graduates from the Police Academy and marries Felicia Cummings all on the same day, his birthday. Later that summer, when his wife is framed for grand theft, Frisco and Felicia go on the run eluding several mob hit attempts as they travel from New York City to Cincinnati, to Atlantic City, and later hide out at the circus before returning to Port Charles where Frisco is intent on clearing his wife's name, is instrumental in the take-down of mob boss, Mr. Big, and is promptly promoted to Detective.

In June 1987, Frisco joins the World Service Bureau (WSB), returning for one night early that December to spend time with his wife before going back into service, and is later declared missing and presumed dead in 1988.

In June 1989, Frisco turns up alive just in time to see Felicia marrying the man who had been programmed to kill him, Colton Shore. Felicia is initially reluctant to choose between Frisco and Colton, but inevitably reunites with her first love on Halloween 1989 and the couple subsequently remarry on January 26, 1990. Afterwards, they go to Europe on their honeymoon/Frisco's concert tour which, unknown to Felicia, is also a cover for Frisco who had been lured back into WSB service after being warned that his loved ones were in danger. While in Paris, Felicia is kidnapped by ex-DVX boss, Cesar Faison, but is rescued by Frisco and Sean. Later, after accidentally overhearing Frisco talking about rejoining the WSB, Felicia, having just learned that she's pregnant, runs away to her grandmother's hacienda in Texas. However, upon hearing that Frisco was hurt during a shooting, she returns to Port Charles. Frisco and Felicia are reunited once again and, after a premature labor scare, joyously welcome their daughter Maxie Jones together on Halloween 1990.

A year later Frisco, Felicia, and Maxie move back to her family's hacienda in Texas. Felicia is constantly worried about the danger that her husband faces and eventually divorces Frisco before returning to Port Charles. In 1994, Maxie becomes ill with Kawasaki syndrome, and Mac Scorpio tracks Frisco down on assignment in Somalia and brings him back to Port Charles. Upon seeing her father, Maxie rapidly recovers from pneumonia and becomes well enough for a transplant. In a tragic twist of fate, she eventually receives a new heart from her cousin B.J. Jones after the little girl is killed in a school bus accident. Frisco and Felicia celebrate their daughter's recovery by making love and after Frisco leaves, Felicia discovers that she is pregnant once again. On March 7, 1995, Felicia gives birth to their second daughter on the floor of Luke's club. The baby girl is named Georgie Jones by her sister, Maxie. Frisco comes home in May 1995 to spend time with his girls and expresses a desire to stay home and be a full-time Dad, but Felicia encourages him to go back to saving the world until he's ready to give up the work for good.

In February 2013, Frisco resurfaces in Port Charles, having been informed of Maxie's plans to act as a surrogate for Lulu Spencer (Julie Marie Berman) and Dante Falconeri (Dominic Zamprogna). After a lukewarm encounter with Frisco, Mac conveys to Felicia his disappointment that she failed to mention their rekindled romance to Frisco, prompting him to wonder if she is embarrassed by her "bartender boyfriend". Maxie walks in on the three of them and is stunned to see her father for the first time in eighteen years. Frisco spends time bonding with Maxie and tries to get closer to Felicia. But at the 2013 Nurse's Ball, Felicia turns down an out of the blue marriage proposal from her ex-husband and, heartbroken, Frisco leaves town yet again, despite pleas from Maxie to stay.

Frisco is mentioned as being the new head of the WSB agency on December 29, 2014.

== Tania Jones ==
Tania Jones
- General Hospital character
- Portrayed by: Hilary Edson
- Duration: 1984–87
- First appearance: March 15, 1984
- Last appearance: March 20, 1987
- Created by: Anne Howard Bailey
In-universe information
- Father: Boris Roskov
- Spouse: Tony Jones (1985–87)
- Children: B. J. Jones; Unnamed Child (miscarriage)

Tania Jones (maiden name Roskov) is a fictional character on the ABC daytime soap General Hospital. The character was portrayed by Hilary Edson from 1984 to 1987.

Tania Roskov showed up early in 1984 as a Russian refugee whose father Boris tried to keep her away from the men he only felt were out to use her. She had a crush on Dr. Grant Andrews, separated from his wife Celia, and Grant's look-alike, the evil Dr. Grant Putnam, used this to make it appear to Celia that Tania was sleeping with her husband. Tania moved on when Grant Putnam was exposed and Grant Andrews reconciled with his wife, and briefly dated Frisco Jones, a handsome rock singer. She soon fell in love with and eventually married his brother, Dr. Tony Jones. They had one daughter, BJ, whose tragic death enabled her cousin Maxie Jones to live. Even though she loved B.J. very much, she and Tony argued about her desire to return to work. While out shopping with sister-in-law Felicia in the spring of 1987 she was run over and killed by a hit and run driver. Later, the driver was revealed to be Corey Blythe, a teenager suffering from a neurological problem who blacked out right before he hit Tania. Tony discovered this while operating on Corey. Tania's friends spearheaded the creation of the Tania Jones Daycare Center at GH.

== Tony Jones ==
Tony Jones
- General Hospital character
- Portrayed by: Brad Maule
- Duration: 1984–2006, 2019
- First appearance: April 18, 1984
- Last appearance: November 8, 2019
- Created by: Anne Howard Bailey
- Introduced by: Gloria Monty (1984); Frank Valentini (2019)
- Book appearances: Robin's Diary
- Spin-off appearances: General Hospital: Twist of Fate (1996); Port Charles
In-universe information
- Other names: Anthony Jones
- Occupation: Neurosurgeon
- Family: Jones
- Parents: Andrew Jones Sr. Cindy Jones
- Brothers: Frisco Jones
- Wife: Tania Roskov (1985–1987); Lucy Coe (1987–1988); Bobbie Spencer (1989–1996)
- Daughters: B. J. Jones
- Adoptive sons: Lucas Jones
- Grandsons: Wiley Cooper-Jones (adoptive); Jonah Corinthos (illegal adoptive)
- Nieces: Maxie Jones; Georgie Jones
- Other relatives: Georgie Spinelli; James West

Anthony "Tony" Jones MD was a fictional character on the ABC soap opera, General Hospital. He is the older and steadier brother of fictional WSB spy Andrew "Frisco" Jones. Tony Jones was portrayed by Brad Maule from 1984 to 1999, with appearances in 2000 and 2006 until the character's death. In October 2019, TVLine announced that Maule would return to the series in a guest capacity as the ghost of the late Tony Jones. Maule was nominated for the Daytime Emmy Award for Outstanding Lead Actor in a Drama Series in 1995, and the Daytime Emmy Award for Outstanding Supporting Actor in a Drama Series in 1997.

Dr. Tony Jones' early years on the show included a number of typical soap opera tragedies, including temporary blindness, being shot by Jack Slater, his wife Tania Roskov's death in a car accident soon after the birth of their daughter, and the marital infidelity of his second wife, Lucy Coe. Tony later married his friend Bobbie Spencer, who adopted his daughter B. J. Jones, who had been named in her honor after Bobbie helped deliver B.J.. Tony and Bobbie adopted Lucas together. They had to return him to his birth mother, Cheryl Stansbury, when it turned out he had been illegally adopted, but they were granted guardianship of Lucas a year later when Cheryl was killed in a car accident. Tony and Bobbie successfully fought for custody of Lucas against his maternal aunt, Tiffany Donely.

Tony's most memorable story came in 1994, when his young daughter B.J. was killed in a school van accident and he made the decision to allow B.J.'s heart to be transplanted into her ailing cousin, Maxie. One of the most heart-breaking scenes ever seen on General Hospital showed Tony talking to his brain-dead daughter, B.J. right before the heart transplant operation. It was a very tearful and emotional goodbye to his daughter. It was a storyline that won much acclaim and several awards for writing and for acting. Two years later, Tony visits B.J.'s grave on October 6, 1996, which would have been her tenth birthday. It was another heartwrenching moment where Tony was emotional throughout the entire scene, where he tells her about the mess with his and Bobbie's marriage. The scene where he touches the ground and then lies down right next to her gravestone earned him an Emmy nomination in 1997.

Later, after his marriage to Bobbie broke up under the stress of her infidelity with Damian Smith and the loss of B.J., he became romantically involved with Carly Benson, the daughter Bobbie gave up for adoption as a teenager. When Carly became pregnant by A. J. Quartermaine, she was initially uncertain whether Tony or A.J. had fathered her son Michael. When the baby was born, his blood type proved that he could not be Tony's son, but Tony still felt like the father because he had cared for him during the months of Carly's pregnancy. He kidnapped baby Michael from Carly for a time. Michael was recovered and Tony was put on trial, but was found not guilty by reason of temporary insanity. Carly then shot and seriously wounded him in open court.

Tony eventually rehabilitated himself and returned to his practice as a neurosurgeon. In recent years, he has been largely a recurring character. He was supportive when his adopted son, Lucas Jones, told his parents he was gay. Tony died in February 2006 during an encephalitis epidemic at General Hospital. Tony told those at his bedside that B.J. was there waiting for him and that he was going to die happy.

== Rose Kelly ==
Rose Kelly
- General Hospital character
- Portrayed by: Loanne Bishop
- Duration: 1980–84
- First appearance: 1980
- Last appearance: August 29, 1984
- Introduced by: Gloria Monty
In-universe information
- Occupation: Owner of kelly's diner
- Husband: Paddy Kelly
- Adoptive daughters: Louise Swenson (foster)
- Stepchildren: Joe Kelly

Rose Kelly is a fictional character from the ABC Daytime soap opera, General Hospital. Loanne Bishop originated the role in 1980, and left in September 1984 after being unhappy with her lack of storylines. Bishop was nominated for a Daytime Emmy Award for Outstanding Supporting Actress in a Drama Series in 1984. She also took part in Love in the Afternoon, a music compilation sung by soap opera stars in 1982.

Rose and her husband Paddy Kelly are the original owners of Kelly's Diner in Port Charles. They get involved with Frank Smith and his mob dealings, and Paddy Kelly is killed by the mob. Rose is the stepmother of Paddy's son Joe Kelly, and becomes the foster mother of Lou Swenson. She later gets involved with Jake Meyer.

== Blackie Parrish ==
Blackie Parrish
- General Hospital character
- Portrayed by: John Stamos
- Duration: 1982–84
- First appearance: January 28, 1982
- Last appearance: April 5, 1984
- Created by: Thom Racina; Leah Laiman; Gloria Monty; Norma Monty
- Introduced by: Gloria Monty
In-universe information
- Occupation: Drummer in blackie and the riff raff
- Adoptive parents: Rick Webber (foster); Lesley Webber (foster)
- Half-sisters: Laura Spencer (foster)

Blackie Parrish is a fictional character from the ABC soap opera General Hospital. He is the foster child of Rick and Lesley Webber. He was portrayed by John Stamos from 1982 to 1984. Stamos was nominated for the Daytime Emmy Award for Outstanding Supporting Actor in a Drama Series in 1983.

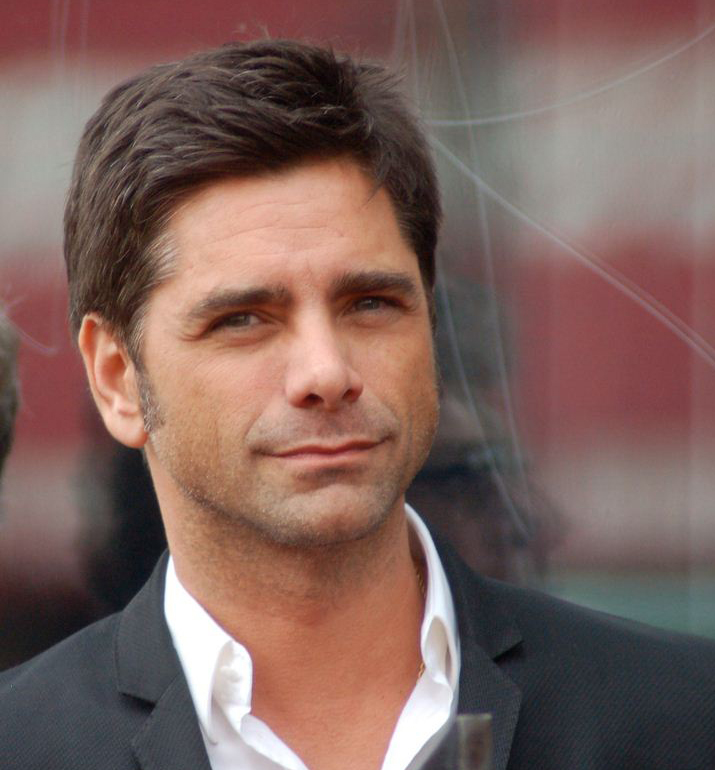
Stamos also starred in another ABC series, the sitcom, Full House.

Lesley Webber was destroyed by the disappearance of her daughter, Laura Spencer. She and her husband, Dr. Rick Webber, took in a foster son, Blackie Parrish, who had just lost his mother. Blackie Parrish was a street kid used to living by his wits. He met his girlfriend, runaway Lou Swenson, when she was hiding in a construction trailer.

Upset by the degradation on the waterfront, Rick Webber founded a sports center to give kids a place to go rather than hang out on the streets and get into trouble. Originally, Blackie showed up as a thug, trying along with his gang of teen hoodlums to stop the uptown wealthy do-gooders from muscling in on his territory. When he came to realize the good that Rick was trying to do, Blackie became supportive, and helped Rick expose one of his friends for stealing the fund raiser money which had initially been blamed on him. Blackie was a big help in getting this center off the ground. Blackie got a job at the Haunted Star doing general errands and parking cars, and was soon hanging out with an older crowd, including Luke Spencer, whom he looked up to as a hero because of Luke's infamous exploits, Robert Scorpio, Tiffany Hill, whom he had a crush on, reporter Jackie Templeton, her sister Laura Templeton, whom Blackie dated briefly, and Holly Sutton. Blackie met Lou in early 1983 while she was trying to hide from mobster Anthony Hand to prevent from being forced into prostitution, Interested in music, and with the help of Lou, he formed Blackie and the Riff Raff, a band in which he played the drums. The group acquired a manager, who brought in Frisco Jones (Jack Wagner) as lead singer. Blackie moved in with Frisco at the Port Charles Hotel.

Under pressure to come up with a hit song, Blackie panicked and developed writer's block. He stole a song from a hotel bellboy, Josh Clayton. Lou knew this and confronted Blackie with Josh's tape. Steffi, Blackie's manager, jumped to grab the tape. In an attempt to get away from her, Lou backed away, fell, hit her head and died.

Blackie owned up to his responsibility for Lou's death and was sentenced to two years in prison for manslaughter.

== Grant Putnam ==
Grant Putnam
- General Hospital character
- Portrayed by: Brian Patrick Clarke
- Duration: 1983; 1985–88
- First appearance: January 24, 1983
- Last appearance: February 26, 1988
- Created by: Anne Howard Bailey
In-universe information
- Other names: Andrei Chernin; The Snowman
- Brothers: Ian Putnam

Grant Putnam is a fictional character on the ABC soap opera, General Hospital. He was portrayed by actor Brian Patrick Clarke in 1983 and again from 1985 to 1988. Clarke also played Grant Andrews in 1983. Putnam was named the number five top General Hospital soap villain. In 2023, Charlie Mason from Soaps She Knows placed Grant as a "Bonus Entry" on his ranked list of General Hospital’s 40+ Greatest Characters of All Time, commenting "Back in the heyday of Port Charles supervillains, few and far between were the ne’er-do-wells who made us see redder shades of red than the Russian spy who stole not only lookalike Grant Andrews’ life but fiancée Celia Quartermaine as well."

Putnam's earlier crimes included allowing his younger brother Ian to die in a skiing accident when they were both teenagers and murdering his doctor while escaping from a sanitarium. When he arrived in Port Charles, he framed Grant Andrews for murder and sabotaged his marriage to Celia Quartermaine. Robert Scorpio helped to send him back to the sanitarium.

A few years later he was released again and wanted revenge on Robert Scorpio. He attempted to kidnap Robert's daughter Robin Scorpio, and in the process murdered Filomena Soltini and kidnapped Anna Devane instead. He was eventually caught again and returned to the sanitarium.

== Alexandria Quartermaine ==
Alexandria Quartermaine
- General Hospital character
- Portrayed by: Renee Anderson
- Duration: 1980–81
- First appearance: November 1980
- Last appearance: September 18, 1981
- Introduced by: Gloria Monty
In-universe information
- Other names: Alex Quartermaine
- Family: Quartermaine
- Uncles: Edward Quartermaine
- First cousins: Bradley Ward; Alan Quartermaine; Tracy Quartermaine; Jimmy Lee Holt

Alexandria "Alex" Quartermaine is a fictional character from the original ABC Daytime soap opera, General Hospital. The role was originated in 1980 by Renee Anderson. Anderson departed from the series in 1981 when the character was killed off. She is a member of the famed Quartermaine family.

=== Casting and creation ===
Upon the departure of Jane Elliot as resident villain-ess, Tracy Quartermaine in the spring of 1980, the producers began crafting a new character to take Tracy's place. In mid November, the series introduced Renee Anderson, as Edward (David Lewis)'s "snake in the grass" niece. Mary Ann Cooper of The News and Courier described the character and the actress as "beautiful and sophisticated." Alexandria's schemes are immediately met with opposition with the introduction of WSB Agent Robert Scorpio (Tristan Rogers). Anderson made her last appearance on the series on September 18, 1981.

=== Storylines ===
Alex's arrival is met by enthusiasm from uncle Edward while her cousin Alan (Stuart Damon) and his wife Monica (Leslie Charleson) question her motives. Edward is so happy to see Alex that he comes out of retirement and becomes an investor with her on her secret project, manufacturing and distributing synthetic diamonds. Alex hires Luke Spencer (Anthony Geary) to track down her competition, the Cassadine family. However, Luke is hesitant to take the job believing Alex is trying to seduce him. Luke eventually tracks down the Cassadines who were operating under the surname, Castle. Prior to her arrival in Port Charles, Alex steals the world's largest uncut diamond, the Ice Princess, paints it black and ships it to Port Charles. However, the diamond is lost in transit forcing Luke, Robert, Alex and Tony Cassadine (André Landzaat) to go after it. Tony starts to romance Alex and they eventually become engaged. Originally in cahoots with scientist James Duvall to get the formula, Alexandria accidentally kills him with the ice princess in order to get it away from him and get onto the Cassadine yacht with Tony. The couple teams up with his brothers, Mikkos (John Colicos) and Victor (Thaao Penghlis) in an effort to take over the world. In September 1981, Alex along with several other guests are invited onto the private cruise ship, Titan where they travel to Mikkos's island. During dinner, Mikkos unveils his plan to hold the entire world to ransom, using the priceless diamond to power his weather machine. On the Titan and later on the island, Alexandria resumes her rivalry with Tiffany Hill, an actress Tony had dumped Alexandria for, and who has since become involved with Victor. Mikkos starts by targeting Port Charles first, sending the city into a blizzard, in the middle of summer. Alexandria is horrified by this and convinces Tony to help her stop his uncontrollably insane brother. Mikkos has them frozen in his ice chamber.

== Betsy Quartermaine ==
Betsy Quartermaine
- General Hospital character
- Portrayed by: Peggy Walton-Walker
- First appearance: October 22, 1987
- Last appearance: December 21, 1987
- Created by: Ann Marcus and Norma Monty
- Introduced by: Gloria Monty
In-universe information
- Occupation: Socialite
- Family: Quartermaine
- Husband: Quentin Quartermaine (pre-1987–?) (Note: It is not known exactly when Quentin and Betsy married, only that it happened between February 1986 and October 1987. It is also not known if Betsy and Quentin got a divorce.)
- Stepchildren: Celia Quartermaine; Three unnamed children

Betsy Quartermaine is a fictional character on the ABC soap opera General Hospital. The role is played by Peggy Walton-Walker for several months in 1987. She is introduced as wife to Quentin Quartermaine and the murderer of her father-in-law Herbert Quartermaine.

== Celia Quartermaine ==
Celia Quartermaine
- General Hospital character
- Portrayed by: Sherilyn Wolter
- Duration: 1983–86
- First appearance: March 17, 1983
- Last appearance: February 26, 1986
- Created by: Anne Howard Bailey
- Introduced by: Gloria Monty
In-universe information
- Other names: Celia Holt; Celia Putnam
- Occupation: Socialite artist
- Family: Quartermaine
- Father: Quentin Quartermaine
- Stepmother: Betsy Quartermaine
- Siblings: Three unknown siblings (adoptive)
- Husband: Grant Andrews (1983–85); Jimmy Lee Holt (1985–86)
- Grandfathers: Herbert Quartermaine
- Other relatives: Edward Quartermaine; Alexandria Quartermaine; Bradley Ward; Alan Quartermaine; Tracy Quartermaine; Jimmy Lee Holt

Celia Quartermaine is a fictional character on the ABC soap opera General Hospital. The role was originated in 1983 by Sherilyn Wolter and departed from the series in 1986 when the character left town. She is introduced as the fiancée of Grant Andrews (Brian Patrick Clarke), who had been impersonating Grant Putnam (also played by Clarke), and an extension to the already established Quartermaine family. Celia was also said to be the best friend of Holly Sutton (Emma Samms), whom she knew in boarding school. One of her major storylines involved her romances to the two Grants and her marriage to her second cousin once removed, Jimmy Lee Holt (Steve Bond).

== Herbert Quartermaine ==
Herbert Quartermaine
- General Hospital character
- Portrayed by: Will B. Hunt
- First appearance: October 19, 1987
- Last appearance: December 14, 1987
- Created by: Ann Marcus and Norma Monty
- Introduced by: Gloria Monty
In-universe information
- Occupation: Socialite businessman
- Family: Quartermaine
- Sons: Quentin Quartermaine
- Grandchildren: Celia Quartermaine; Three unnamed children
- Grandparents: Edgar Quartermaine; Martha Quartermaine
- Uncles: George Quartermaine
- First cousins: Edward Quartermaine
- Other relatives: Alexandria Quartermaine; Bradley Ward; Alan Quartermaine; Tracy Quartermaine; Jimmy Lee Holt

Herbert Quartermaine is a fictional character on the ABC soap opera General Hospital. The character has been mentioned for numerous years as Edward Quartermaine's cousin hellbent on getting the rest of the entire Quartermaine inheritance left after the death of Edward's grandfather Edgar. The character's on-screen debut aired in October 1987, played by Will B. Hunt. The character was presumed dead after faking his death from November 30 to December 7 but was ultimately killed off a week later by his daughter-in-law Betsy, who tried to frame his personal assistant Autumn Clayton for the murder.

== Quentin Quartermaine ==
Quentin Quartermaine
- General Hospital character
- Portrayed by: Alex Sheafe (1983–86); Allan Miller (1987–88)
- Duration: 1983–88
- First appearance: June 3, 1983
- Last appearance: January 4, 1988
- Created by: Anne Howard Bailey
- Introduced by: Gloria Monty
In-universe information
- Occupation: Socialite businessman
- Family: Quartermaine
- Father: Herbert Quartermaine
- Wife: Unnamed woman (1984–86); Betsy Quartermaine (pre-1987–?)
- Daughters: Celia Quartermaine
- Adoptive children: Three unnamed children
- Other relatives: Edward Quartermaine; Alexandria Quartermaine; Bradley Ward; Alan Quartermaine; Tracy Quartermaine; Jimmy Lee Holt

Quentin Quartermaine is a fictional character on the ABC soap opera General Hospital. The role was originated in 1983 by Alex Sheafe in a frequent guest appearance until his departure from the series on February 19, 1986. Allan Miller took over the role from October 22, 1987, to January 4, 1988. He is introduced as an extension to the already established Quartermaine family.

== Ned Ashton ==
Ned Ashton
- General Hospital character
- Portrayed by: Uncredited (1979); Kurt McKinney (1988–91); Wally Kurth (1991–present)
- Duration: 1979; 1988–2007; 2012–present
- First appearance: November 1979
- Created by: Ann Marcus; Norma Monty
- Introduced by: Gloria Monty (1979); H. Wesley Kenney (1988); Frank Valentini (2012)
- Book appearances: Robin's Diary
In-universe information
- Other names: Edward Lawrence Quartermaine; Eddie Maine; Ned Quartermaine
- Occupation: CEO of L&B Records; Former Mayor of Port Charles; Former CEO of ELQ; Singer/Songwriter; Former ELQ Shareholder; Former Tennis instructor at Green Meadows Spa
- Family: Quartermaine
- Parents: Larry Ashton; Tracy Quartermaine
- Half-brothers: Dillon Quartermaine
- Spouse: Dawn Winthrop (1990); Jenny Eckert (1992–93); Lois Cerullo (1994–97); Katherine Bell (1994); Chloe Morgan (1999–2000); Olivia Falconeri (2017–present)
- Daughters: Brook Lynn Ashton
- Adoptive sons: Leo Falconeri
- Stepsons: Dante Falconeri
- Grandchildren: Gio Palmieri
- Grandfathers: Edward Quartermaine
- Grandmothers: Lila Quartermaine
- Uncles: Charlie Prince; Alan Quartermaine; Bradley Ward; Jimmy Lee Holt
- First cousins: Skye Quartermaine (adoptive); A. J. Quartermaine; Jason Morgan; Drew Cain; Emily Quartermaine (adoptive); Justus Ward; Faith Ward; Austin Gatlin-Holt

Ned Ashton (also Quartermaine) is a fictional character on the ABC soap opera General Hospital. Originated by Kurt McKinney in the fall of 1988, the role has been most notably portrayed by Wally Kurth on and off since 1991.

=== Casting ===
Actor Kurt McKinney originated the role of Ned Ashton on September 7, 1988. After three years with the series, McKinney last appeared on August 30, 1991. The role was quickly recast with Kurth, who made his first appearance on September 9, 1991. In February 2005, Kurth was dropped to recurring status, and he departed from the series in July 2007. He has reprised the role for brief stints in November 2007, November 2012, and most recently since January 24, 2013. He returned in April 2014. In March 2015, Kurth was put on contract with Days of Our Lives, leading to his impending departure from the role of Ned.

=== Storylines ===
Ned is the son of Tracy Quartermaine and Larry Ashton, a British aristocrat. His parents divorced when he was young and he was raised mostly by his father while his mother went traveling. He attended boarding school and rarely saw his mother's family. He heads up the Quartermaine family business ELQ and also handles personal family crises that arise, earning him the family nickname "Gatekeeper". Ned also maintains a longtime rivalry with his cousin AJ Quartermaine over the years.

Ned was mentioned but not seen until he met his uncle Alan's wife, Dr. Monica Quartermaine, at a country spa and introduced himself as "Ward." Monica and Ned did not recognize each other because they had not seen each other since Ned was a child. They had a passionate fling and when Ned arrived in Port Charles, Monica got the shock of her life when her lover turned out to be her nephew! He later married Monica's daughter Dawn Winthrop, a union that was subsequently annulled. He married and divorced Spencer cousin Jenny Eckert, and band manager and recording company executive Lois Cerullo, the mother of his daughter Brook Lynn Ashton. He was also briefly married to Katherine Bell because she was blackmailing the family. The marriage was invalid, because at the same time he was married to Lois as Eddie Maine, his alter ego and stage name he used for his music career. He had a long affair with Alexis Davis, but she developed cold feet at their wedding and ran out on him.

He had a platonic marriage to Chloe Morgan, who was a distant cousin of his grandmother Lila, and later was engaged to Alexis' long-lost sister Kristina Cassadine, whose death he and Alexis blamed on Sonny Corinthos. Most recently, Ned had a relationship with Skye Chandler after it was revealed she was not actually Alan's daughter. For a time, he pretended to be the father of Alexis' daughter, Kristina Davis and had custody of the little girl when Alexis was on trial for the murder of Luis Alcazar and while she was sentenced to probation afterwards. Alexis did not want the Quartermaines to be involved in the girl's life, and he later gave her custody. Eventually, it came out Sonny Corinthos was Kristina's father and Ned was no longer a part of her life.

Ned has spent recent years out of town, however he returned in November 2007 to attend Emily's funeral. In May 2010, it was mentioned Ned is currently in Europe maintaining several bands with Lois. On July 1, 2011, it was mentioned Ned and Lois were together again and living in Paris while maintaining four other bands. On November 21, 2012, Ned returned for the memorial of his grandfather Edward Quartermaine.

On January 24, 2013, Ned returned once again to support his mother in her battle to maintain leadership of ELQ.

On April 15, 2014, Ned again returned for the funeral of his cousin, A.J. Quartermaine – and to advise his mother Tracy on how to deal with Luke's recent marriage proposal. When Olivia Falconeri (Lisa LoCicero) found out that she was pregnant by Julian Jerome (William deVry), Ned stood up for her and decided that he would be the baby's father. Ned paid Liesl Obrecht (Kathleen Gati) so that Obrecht would say that the baby boy was dead. She told Julian that the boy had died and was accidentally cremated. Ned left with the baby on May 19, 2015.

Ned returned again in 2016 and rekindled his relationship with Olivia, whom he later married. Ned would often clash with Michael over how to run ELQ. Eventually, Ned left the company and successfully ran for Mayor of Port Charles.

More recently Ned married Olivia Falconeri and legally adopted Leo, Olivia's son with Julian Jerome.

== Lorena Sharpe ==
Lorena Sharpe
- General Hospital character
- Portrayed by: Shelley Taylor Morgan
- Duration: 1984–86
- First appearance: February 10, 1984
- Last appearance: June 11, 1986
- Created by: Anne Howard Bailey
- Introduced by: Gloria Monty

Lorena Sharpe is a fictional character on the ABC Daytime soap opera, General Hospital. She was portrayed by Shelley Taylor Morgan, who originated the role in 1984.

== Filomena Soltini ==
Filomena Soltini
- General Hospital character
- Portrayed by: Argentina Brunetti
- Duration: 1985–88
- First appearance: September 9, 1985
- Last appearance: January 19, 1988
- Created by: Anne Howard Bailey
- Book appearances: Robin's Diary
In-universe information
- Children: Leo Soltini; Phoebe Soltini
- Grandchildren: Robin Scorpio (adoptive)
- First cousins: Mary Angela Soltini

Filomena Soltini is a fictional character on the ABC soap opera General Hospital. She was portrayed by Argentina Brunetti, who originated the role in 1985.

Filomena first appeared on-screen on September 9, 1985, however it is revealed she previously helped Robert Scorpio and Anna Devane when they washed ashore in Italy years prior. After Robert leaves Anna, Anna secretly gives birth to his daughter, Robin Scorpio. Fearing for Robin's safety due to Anna's career as a double agent, Anna leaves Robin in Filomena's care, leading Robin to believe that Filomena is her grandmother and Anna is only a family friend named Love. Even after Robin and Robert learn the truth in 1985, Filomena is still often referred to as Robin's grandmother, and despite no blood relation she is considered family nonetheless. She remained on the show in a recurring capacity until being murdered by Grant Putnam when he attempted to kidnap Robin on January 15, 1988. On the episode of January 20, 1988, she was announced dead.

== Olivia St. John ==
Olivia St. John
- General Hospital character
- Portrayed by: Tonja Walker
- Duration: 1988–90; 2017
- First appearance: April 1, 1988
- Last appearance: March 23, 2017
- Created by: Ann Marcus; Norma Monty
- Introduced by: H. Wesley Kenney (1988); Frank Valentini (2017)
In-universe information
- Other names: Olivia Jerome; Oscar Jessup; Liv Lowry
- Family: Jerome
- Father: Victor Jerome
- Brothers: Evan Jerome; Julian Jerome
- Half-brothers: Dino Antoinelli
- Half-sisters: Ava Jerome
- Nephews: Evan Jerome Jr. Lucas Jones; Leo Falconeri; Andrew Nero
- Nieces: Sam Morgan; Kiki Jerome; Avery Corinthos

Olivia St. John is a fictional character on the ABC soap opera General Hospital. She is portrayed by Tonja Walker, who originated the role from 1988 to 1990. In 2016, producer Frank Valentini announced that Walker was returning to General Hospital in an undisclosed role in early 2017. Before her re-appearance, fans speculated for months that Olivia would be re-appearing. Walker re-appeared onscreen on January 17, 2017, where it was revealed that she was reprising her role as Olivia.

Olivia is the daughter of mob boss Victor Jerome (Jack Axelrod). She was looking to gain control of the family empire, but battled with her brother Julian (Jason Culp), as well as Dino Antoinelli, Victor's illegitimate son, for control. The battle became bitter, with Olivia trying to kill Julian and Dino trying to kill Olivia. The latter attempt led to Olivia being placed in a mental facility due to brain damage. Olivia fell obsessively in love with Jerome henchman Duke Lavery (Ian Buchanan). However, his heart belonged to Anna Devane (Finola Hughes). When her attempts to win his affections failed, Olivia tried to kill Duke. Anna, though, walked into the trap and ended up miscarrying Duke's child. After Victor's death, Julian took over the empire, and planned to eliminate Duke with Olivia taking the fall. Olivia, though, escaped Julian and tried to warn Anna of Julian's plan. Before she could, Julian shot and killed her.

In 2017, Olivia resurfaces, having taken over the Jerome mob in secret from Julian (William deVry). She is responsible for the car bombing that killed Morgan Corinthos (Bryan Craig), which was meant for Julian. She's bent on revenge against Julian for trying to kill her and for killing Duke, whom she is still obsessed with. Olivia threatens Julian's family, including his infant son, Leo Falconeri, and Sam Morgan (Kelly Monaco), Julian's pregnant daughter, to force him to do her bidding. She tries to buy out General Hospital, telling Julian she wants to convert it to condos. However, the plan falls through, and she later reveals that she's actually wanting the lab underneath the hospital, hoping to revive Duke. She kidnaps Anna's daughter, Robin Scorpio (Kimberly McCullough) and Griffin Munro (Matt Cohen), Duke's son, but Anna finds them and Olivia escapes. She kidnaps Alexis Davis (Nancy Lee Grahn), Julian's ex-wife, and forces Julian to shoot her or she'll kill him. She wants Julian to lose the one he loves, since he took away her love. Instead, Julian helps Alexis get free, and supposedly falls off a bridge after Olivia shoots him. Olivia tries to skip town, but she is caught by Carly Corinthos (Laura Wright), Morgan's mother. Wanting revenge for her son, Carly tries to kill Olivia, but is stopped by Morgan's father and Robin's longtime best friend, Sonny (Maurice Benard) after all the information from Jason Morgan (Billy Miller) and Curtis Ashford (Donnell Turner) were given to commissioner Jordan Ashford (Vinessa Antoine). Olivia is arrested, and sent to a mental asylum. In early 2024, it was revealed that Olivia had been murdered.

== Lou Swenson ==
Louisa "Lou" Swenson
- General Hospital character
- Portrayed by: Danielle von Zerneck
- Duration: 1983–84
- First appearance: February 4, 1983
- Last appearance: March 29, 1984
- Created by: Anne Howard Bailey
- Introduced by: Gloria Monty
In-universe information
- Occupation: Student

Lou Swenson is a fictional character on the ABC daytime soap opera General Hospital. She was the foster daughter of Rose Kelly. The role was played by Danielle von Zerneck from February 4, 1983, to April 29, 1984. Lou came to Port Charles in 1983 on a busload of runaway girls. She was spotted and met by Blackie Parrish while trying to escape from mobster Anthony Head. At the same, Lou stole some food. In late February 1983, Blackie hid Lou by bringing her to the Webbers. She cleaned herself up, Blackie gave her some of Amy's clothes and he hid her in the trailer at the construction site. Later, he took her to Port Charles University to hide, but her scavenger-like behavior attracted Rick's interests. In late March 1983, Blackie introduced Lou to Robert Scorpio and Burt Ramsey. By Mid-April Lou began attending PCU. On May 2, 1983, Robert and Blackie responded to Lou's screams by breaking into her dorm, as she told Robert that she came to Port Charles and got involved with Hand's prostitution ring. In the middle of May 1983, a judge allowed Lou to live with Rose, and an overjoyed Lou gave Blackie a tender kiss. In mid-Summer 1983, when Rose was ill it was up to Lou and Jake to take over Kelly's. It was at this point that Blackie and Lou kissed deeply and became boyfriend and girlfriend. Later that year, when Blackie putting a new rock band by auditioning band members, Lou dropped by to enjoy. In January 1984, even though Lou was furious at Rose and said that she hated her, she still went to a meeting with a social worker so that she would not be taken away from Jake and Rose. In mid-March 1984, the events that led to Lou's end on the show began. New Port Charles resident Frisco Jones joined with Blackie to help form Blackie and the Riff Raff. Their first big single, "Make Me Believe It," which was stolen by Blackie, began to play on the radio. In late March 1984, Lou was cleaning Blackie and Frisco's hotel room and was shocked to hear a tape of Josh playing the song for Blackie. Lou confronted Blackie about the song, but he screamed at her, called her a liar and told her to get out of his life. On March 28, 1984, Lou distracted the hotel clerk while Josh stole the key to Blackie's room. There they encountered Blackie, Frisco and Blackie's manager, Steffi Brand, who got into a struggle with Lou over the tape. During the fight, Lou fell and hit her head on a table. While Frisco called 911, Blackie cradled Lou's lifeless body in his arms. On March 29, 1984, Lou was taken into the emergency room at General Hospital where Dr. Alan Quartermaine attempted to save her life. He was unable to save her life. A devastated Blackie felt responsible, admitted guilt in court and was sentenced to two years in prison for his role in her death.

== Jackie Templeton ==
Jackie Templeton
- General Hospital character
- Portrayed by: Demi Moore (1982–1984); Kim Delaney (2020–2021)
- Duration: 1982–1984; 2020–2021
- First appearance: January 4, 1982
- Last appearance: June 23, 2021
- Created by: Thom Racina and Leah Laiman
- Introduced by: Gloria Monty (1982); Frank Valentini (2020)
In-universe information
- Occupation: Reporter
- Siblings: Laura Templeton
- Husband: Gregory Chase
- Sons: Harrison Chase
- Stepsons: Hamilton Finn

Jackie Templeton is a fictional character from the ABC daytime soap opera General Hospital. The role was originated by Demi Moore from January 4, 1982, to April 20, 1984. Over thirty-six years later, the role was recast with Kim Delaney, who made her first appearance on October 6, 2020.

== Dawn Winthrop ==
Dawn Winthrop
- General Hospital character
- Portrayed by: Kim Valentine (1989); Sharon Case (1989–90); Lisa Fuller (1990); Jennifer Guthrie (1990–91)
- Duration: 1989–91
- First appearance: January 12, 1989
- Last appearance: March 1, 1991
- Created by: Gene Palumbo
- Introduced by: H. Wesley Kenney
In-universe information
- Occupation: Student nurse
- Father: David Langton
- Mother: Monica Quartermaine
- Stepfather: Alan Quartermaine
- Half-brothers: A. J. Quartermaine; Jason Morgan (adoptive)
- Half-sisters: Nikki Langton; Emily Quartermaine (adoptive)
- Spouse: Ned Ashton (1990)
- Aunts: Veronica Bard
- Nephews: Michael Corinthos; Jake Webber (adoptive); Danny Morgan (adoptive)

Dawn Winthrop is a fictional character on the ABC daytime soap opera General Hospital. She was the daughter of Monica Quartermaine and David Langton. The role was originated by Kim Valentine from January 12 to June 13, 1989. Sharon Case (who would later be known for her lengthy stint as Sharon Newman on The Young and the Restless) portrayed the role from June 15, 1989, to February 6, 1990. Lisa Fuller briefly portrayed the role from February 8, 1990, to April 12, 1990, and Jennifer Guthrie was the final actress to play Dawn from April 17, 1990, to March 1, 1991, when the character was killed off on February 27, 1991.

Dawn came to Port Charles in 1989 and became a student nurse at General Hospital. It was then learned Dawn was Monica Quartermaine's long-lost daughter with David Langton. Dawn was excited to be a part of the Quartermaine family and to fall in love with Tracy Quartermaine's son, Ned Ashton. Ned was so happy with Dawn, he bought her Spoon Island.

In 1990, Ned and Dawn became engaged. At the same time, Dawn had a crush on con artist Decker Moss, but still loved Ned. On their wedding day, it was revealed Ned had a one-night stand with Dawn's mother, Monica. Dawn was so angry, she left Port Charles with Decker in Ned's car.

Dawn and Decker returned to Port Charles in 1991. Dawn made up with her mother and got engaged to Decker. While Decker was a way on business, Ned tried to forge a fake letter to Decker from Dawn. When Dawn found out, she slapped him. Dawn moved in with friend and fellow nursing student Meg Lawson in a condo paid for by Monica. Dawn then became very sick, but then got better around the time Decker returned to town. They were very happy.

Edge Jerome wanted to break up and kill Decker and Dawn for Dawn's money. Then, during a fire at Body Heat, a club Dawn and Decker owned, he hit both of them in the head with a pipe and framed Decker. Dawn was murdered. Decker was later proved not guilty and left town depressed. Monica was also very upset.
