= Anne Howard Bailey =

American dramatist

Anne Howard Bailey (July 26, 1924 – November 23, 2006) was an American writer known particularly for her work as a screenwriter and opera librettist.

== Life and career ==
Born and raised in Memphis, Bailey attended Rhodes College, where she graduated in 1945 with a bachelor's degree in creative writing. After college she moved to New York City, where she began writing for theatre and television. She was a regular contributor to the Armstrong Circle Theatre and Appointment with Adventure during the 1950s and was one of the major writers for National Velvet during the 1960s. Her most successful work as a screenwriter was working as a head writer on several different soap operas during the 1980s, including ABC Daytime's General Hospital (1983–1986) and NBC Daytime's Days of Our Lives (1989–1990). She also created the short-lived 1970s soap opera How to Survive a Marriage. After being fired from Days of Our Lives in 1990, Al Rabin was quoted as saying:

[Bailey is] a wonderful writer before she got here. She was a wonderful writer here and she will be a wonderful writer in her next project. It's just that the emphasis shifted slightly from romance to adventure. Since we preferred the audience that we had, we will be shifting back.

For General Hospital, Bailey notably created such characters as Frisco Jones, Dr. Tony Jones, and Felicia Jones. She was the head writer for NBC's Santa Barbara between 1987 and 1989, for which she won a Daytime Emmy Award in her final year with the program. Bailey also wrote for prime-time television including work for Bonanza, Moment of Truth, Beacon Hill, and 87th Precinct. She also worked as a story editor for The Adams Chronicles.

As an opera librettist, Bailey wrote librettos for four works. Her first libretto was for Leonard Kastle's Deseret, which is about the life of Brigham Young. The opera was commissioned for television by the NBC Opera Theatre and was first broadcast in 1961. This was followed by a second opera for television, Thomas Pasatieri's The Trial of Mary Lincoln, which was first broadcast on PBS in 1972. For this work Bailey won an Emmy Award.

She collaborated with Pasatieri again for his first full-length opera The Penitentes, which premiered at the Aspen Music Festival in 1974. Her final libretto was for Kenton Coe's Rachel, an opera about United States President Andrew Jackson and his wife, Rachel Donelson Robards, which premiered at Knoxville Opera in 1989.

== Death ==
Bailey died of congestive heart failure in Rancho Mirage, California, aged 82.

== Filmography ==
=== Films ===
Year	Film	Credit	Notes
1959	The Bloody Brood	Screenplay By	
1961	Aus Gründen der Sicherheit	Story By	

=== Television ===
Year	TV Series	Credit	Notes
1951-55	Armstrong Circle Theatre	Writer	12 Episodes
1951-57	Lux Video Theatre	Writer	11 Episodes
1955	Appointment with Adventure	Writer	4 Episodes
1955	Justice	Writer	4 Episodes
1955	On Camera	Writer	1 Episode
1955	Star Tonight	Writer	1 Episode
1956	Rheingold Theater	Writer	3 Episodes
1959	The Unforeseen	Writer	1 Episode
1960-61	Surfside 6	Writer	4 Episodes
1960-62	National Velvet	Writer	15 Episodes
1961	NBC Opera Theatre	Writer	1 Episode
1961	87th Precinct	Writer	1 Episode
1963	Bonanza	Writer	1 Episode
1972	NET Opera Theater	Librettist	1 Episode
1974-75	How to Survive a Marriage	Writer, Creator	
1976	The Adams Chronicles	Writer, Story Editor	6 Episodes
1976	The Doctors	Writer	23 Episodes
1977	Family	Writer	1 Episode
1982-86	General Hospital	Head Writer	
1987-89	Santa Barbara	Head Writer	177 Episodes
1989	Days of Our Lives	Head Writer	

== Awards and nominations ==
=== Daytime Emmy Award ===
==== Wins ====
- (1989; Best Writing; Santa Barbara)

==== Nominations ====
- (1983 & 1984; Best Writing; General Hospital)
- (1988; Best Writing; Santa Barbara)

=== Primetime Emmy Awards ===
==== Wins ====
- (1972; Outstanding Writing Achievement in Comedy, Variety or Music; The Trial of Mary Lincoln)

=== Christopher Award ===
==== Wins ====
- (1955; Armstrong Circle Theatre)
