= Monday Night Football (disambiguation) =

Monday Night Football is an American television broadcast of National Football League games.

The title Monday Night Football may also refer to:

- ABC Monday Night Football (video game), an American football video game
- Monday Night Football (British TV programme), a British television broadcast of Premier League games
- "Monday Night Football" (How I Met Your Mother), the 14th episode in the second season of the television series How I Met Your Mother (2007)
- Monday Night Football on Triple M, an Australian radio broadcast of National Rugby League games
- Monday Night Soccer, a former League of Ireland highlights show
