= Saturday Night Football (disambiguation) =

Saturday Night Football is the name given to college football broadcasts on Saturday nights on the American Broadcasting Company (ABC) television network.

Saturday Night Football may also refer to:

- Big Ten Saturday Night, Saturday night college football broadcasts on the NBC television network starting in 2023
- NFL on DuMont, which ran on Saturday nights from 1951 to 1955
- NFL Network Exclusive Game Series, which included games branded as Saturday Night Football from 2006 to 2008
- ESPN College Football Saturday Primetime
- Saturday Night Football (UK TV programme), 2013–2016
