= Sandra Dee Robinson =

American actress

- Born: Sandra Ferguson; March 23, 1967 (age 59); Pittsburgh, Pennsylvania, U.S.
- Other name: Sandra Reinhardt
- Occupations: Actress; Media Trainer/Performance Coach; Spokesperson/Host
- Years active: 1985–present
- Spouses: John Reinhardt (m. 1989; div. 1992) Allen Robinson (m. 2005)
- Website: www.sandradeerobinson.com

Sandra Dee Robinson, also sometimes credited as Sandra Robinson (born March 23, 1967), is an American actress, former beauty pageant contestant, and founder of the media training and consulting firm Charisma On Camera.

== Early life and pageantry ==
Robinson was born Sandra Ferguson in Pittsburgh, Pennsylvania and grew up in the nearby suburb of Jefferson Hills. She began her career as a model by participating in beauty pageants. In her second major competition, she was named Miss Pennsylvania USA in March 1985. She then competed in Miss USA, the pageant to select the American entrant for the Miss Universe pageant, later that year.

== Acting career ==
After her yearlong reign, Robinson began actively pursuing a career as an actress with intent to work in daytime drama. Her first, and most notable soap opera credit is her portrayal of Amanda Cory on Another World starting in August 1987. She left in 1993, returning in 1998 and remaining until the show's cancellation the following year.

In 1997, she temporarily replaced Katherine Kelly Lang as Brooke Logan on The Bold and the Beautiful while Lang was on maternity leave. Several months later, she played jewel thief, Jade Sheridan, on Sunset Beach.

In 2005, Robinson temporarily joined the cast of General Hospital as a recast Felicia Scorpio-Jones and 2008 saw her cast as Dr. Charlotte Taylor on NBC's Days of Our Lives.

Her projects away from daytime include episodes of the series Renegade and Silk Stalkings as well as an episode of the series Hot Line. Sandra has appeared in primetime shows such as Two and a Half Men, CSI, among others. She also worked on the web series The Bay.

== Charisma On Camera ==
Along with speaking engagements, she is the founder and owner of the media training and consulting firm Charisma On Camera.

== Personal life ==
Robinson has been married twice. Her first marriage was to John Reinhardt, whom she married in 1989 while starring on Another World. During that time, she was credited as Sandra Reinhardt. She reverted to her maiden name after their divorce. She married her second husband, stunt coordinator Allen Robinson, in 2005 and took his surname professionally.

== Filmography ==
=== Film ===
Year	Title	Role	Notes
1995	Illegal in Blue	Joanne	Credited as Sandra Reinhardt
1996	Fox Hunt	Sunny	Credited as Sandra Ferguson
1998	Interlocked: Thrilled to Death	Emily	also known as A Bold Affair, Interlocked, credited as Sandra Ferguson
2009	Fathers and Their Daughters	Robyn	
2010	The Grove	Kate	Credited as Sandra Robinson
2011	Sebastian	Elizabeth Roebuck	Credited as Sandra Robinson
2016	The Man in the Silo	Emily Wells	Credited as Sandra Robinson

=== Television ===
Year	Title	Role	Notes	Others
1987–1992	Another World	Amanda Cory #3	Contact role	Credited as Sandra Reinhardt (1987–1992); as Sandra Ferguson (1998-1999)
1998–1999	Another World	Amanda Cory #3	Contact role	Credited as Sandra Reinhardt (1987–1992); as Sandra Ferguson (1998-1999)
1994	Hot Line	Stephanie	Episode: "Voyeur"	Credited as Sandra Reinhardt
1994	Diagnosis Murder	Police Woman	Episode: "The Busy Body"	Credited as Sandra Reinhardt
1995	VR.5	Monique Fellowes	Episode: "Love and Death"	Credited as Sandra Reinhardt
1995	Dream On	Ann	Episode: "Pressure Cooker"	Credited as Sandra Reinhardt
1995	Baywatch Nights	Stormy Walters	Episode: "Long Distance Runaround"	Credited as Sandra Reinhardt
1995	Land's End	Berry	Episode: "Windfall"	Credited as Sandra Reinhardt
1995–1996	Silk Stalkings	Robin Curry / Jennifer "Jen" McNiel	2 episodes	Credited as Sandra Reinhardt
1996	High Tide	Cathy	2 episodes	Credited as Sandra Reinhardt
1996	The Colony	N/A	TV movie	Credited as Sandra Ferguson
1996–1997	Renegade	Sandy Carruthers	Recurring role	Credited as Sandra Ferguson
1997	The Bold and the Beautiful	Brooke Logan	Temporary replacement	Credited as Sandra Ferguson
1997	An Early Grave	Eve	TV Movie	
1997–1998	Sunset Beach	Jade Sheridan	Recurring role	
1999	L.A. Heat	Det. Nicole Stockman	3 episodes	Credited as Sandra Ferguson
2000	18 Wheels of Justice	Marti Tucker	Episode: "Triple Play"	Credited as Sandra Ferguson
2001	Falcon Down	Barbara Edwards	TV Movie	
2005	General Hospital	Felicia Scorpio	Recurring role	Credited as Sandra Ferguson
2005	CSI: Miami	Patrice Boland	Episode: "48 Hours to Life"	
2005	Out of Practice	Sophie	Episode: "The Heartbreak Kid"	
2007	Pandemic	Carla Florin	Miniseries	
2007	Criminal Minds	Michelle Colucci	Episode: "About Face"	
2008	Zoey 101	Mrs. Brooks	Episodes: "Goodbye Zoey: Parts 1 & 2"	Credited as Sandra Robinson
2008	Two and a Half Men	Georgia	Episode: "Meander to Your Dander"	
2008–2009	Days of Our Lives	Dr. Charlotte Taylor	Contact role	Credited as Sandra Robinson
2009	The Secret Life of the American Teenager	Attractive Woman	Episode: "The Summer of our Discontent"	
2009	Ice Dreams	Alice Brown	TV movie	
2010–2025	The Bay	Dr. Christine Nelson	Recurring role	Partially as Sandra Robinson
2014	19-2	Church Caretaker	Episode: The Party	
