= Quartermain =

Quartermain or Quartermaine is a surname which may refer to:

== People ==
- Allan Quartermaine, (1888–1978), British civil engineer
- Buck Quartermain (born 1967), ring name of American wrestler
- Joel Quartermain (born 1977), Australian musician
- Danny Quartermaine (born 1997), English boxer
- Lionel Quartermaine, acting chair of the Aboriginal and Torres Strait Islander Commission (2003–2004)
- Stephen Quartermain (born 1962), Australian television personality and sports journalist

== Fictional characters ==
- Allan Quatermain, hero of H. Rider Haggard's King Solomon's Mines (1885) and its various sequels and prequels
- Clay Quartermain, a secret agent in the Marvel Comics universe
- Quartermaine family, characters in the soap opera General Hospital
- Victor Quartermaine, the main villain from the movie Wallace & Gromit: The Curse of the Were-Rabbit
