= Kristina Wagner =

American actress

- Occupation: Actress
- Years active: 1984–present
- Spouse: Jack Wagner (m. 1993; div. 2006)
- Children: 2

Kristina Wagner, formerly known as Kristina Malandro, is an American actress. She is best known for her role as Felicia Jones on the ABC soap opera General Hospital. She also briefly had a small role on the ABC series Hotel in the late 1980s.

== Career ==
On September 7, 1984, Kristina Malandro got her big break when she was cast as Felicia Cummings on General Hospital as the spirited Aztec princess.

In 2012, it was announced that Wagner would reprise the role of Felicia, with a first airing on April 27 that year.

In 2013, it was announced that Wagner was releasing a documentary, Children of Internment, which she produced and directed with her brother, Joe Crump. The documentary concerns the events surrounding the American internment of German-Americans during World War II. The documentary won Best Documentary at the Santa Fe Film Festival.

Wagner appeared as Nora Avery alongside her ex-husband, actor Jack Wagner, on the Hallmark Channel's When Calls the Heart.

At age 54, Wagner posed in a bikini for the first time ever for the cover of First for Women.

In 2019, Wagner celebrated her 35-year journey with General Hospital, recounting how the journey affected both her professional and personal life.

In late 2021, Wagner was placed back under contract at General Hospital after 18 years downgraded to recurring.

== Personal life ==
After privately dating, Malandro went public about her relationship with her General Hospital co-star, Jack Wagner, when she announced her pregnancy in 1990. Kristina and Jack Wagner eventually wed on December 18, 1993, in a private ceremony in Lake Tahoe. Citing irreconcilable differences, they filed for divorce in February 2001. After two years apart, the Wagners announced that they were working through their problems and privately reconciling; they publicized their news of formal reconciliation in 2004. However, in 2005, the Wagners once again filed for divorce, which was finalized the following year. The couple had two sons born in 1990 and 1994. Their younger son died in Los Angeles on June 6, 2022. On June 13, 2022, Wagner and former husband Jack announced that their younger son died of drug addiction. The couple have since created a scholarship fund in honour of their son. All funds donated to the Harrison Wagner Scholarship Fund will be used to directly help young men pay their rent or a portion of their rent who could not otherwise afford their care at New Life House (a sober living facility in California).

After her divorce, she returned to college and attended California State University, Northridge where she majored in history. In her senior year, she began working on what became the Children of Internment documentary.

As a self-described adventurer, Wagner does camping, river rafting and mountaineering, ice skating, swimming and gymnastics.

== Filmography ==
Film and television
Year	Title	Role	Notes
1984–2005; 2007–2008; 2012–present	General Hospital	Felicia Jones Scorpio	TV series (635 episodes)
1988	Hotel	Susan Atwell	TV series (Episode: "Power Play")
1994	Double Dragon	Linda Lash	
1994	A Low Down Dirty Shame	Lisa	
1994	Men Who Hate Women & the Women Who Love Them	Lacey	TV film
2015–2016	When Calls the Heart	Nora Avery	Recurring role (13 episodes)
2018	The Storyteller	Dr. Gordon	
