= Friday Night Football =

Friday Night Football may refer to:

- Friday Night Football (AFL), Australia
- Friday Night Football (NRL), Australia
- Friday Night Football, the Friday installment of CFL on TSN, Canada
- Friday Night Football, a programme on STV Sports Centre, Scotland
- Fox UFL Friday, the Friday broadcast of United Football League (2024), United States
