= Carly Corinthos =

Fictional character from General Hospital

- General Hospital character
- Laura Wright as Carly Corinthos
- Portrayed by: Sarah Joy Brown (1996–2001, 2014); Tamara Braun (2001–2005, 2014); Shayne Lamas (2005); Jennifer Bransford (2005); Laura Wright (2005–present); Eden McCoy (2020)
- Duration: 1996–present
- First appearance: April 5, 1996
- Created by: Karen Harris and Robert Guza, Jr. (Note: The development of Bobbie's first-born daughter was shown in February 1996, under executive producer Wendy Riche and head writers Claire Labine and Matthew Labine. The character was later developed and introduced under executive producer, Riche and head writers, Robert Guza, Jr. and Karen Harris and script writer Patrick Mulcahey.)
- Introduced by: Wendy Riche
- Book appearances: The Secret Life of Damian Spinelli
- Sarah Joy Brown as Carly Corinthos

- Tamara Braun as Carly Corinthos
In-universe information
- Other names: Caroline Leigh Benson (maiden name); Carly Roberts (alias); Carly Quartermaine; Carly Alcazar; Carly Jacks; Carly Spencer; Barbara Saunders
- Occupation: Editor-in-chief of Crimson (2024); Owner of Bobbie's Diner; Hotelier (2006–2022; since 2024); Businesswoman; Physical therapist; Mob boss (2021)
- Family: Spencer
- Father: John Durant
- Mother: Bobbie Spencer
- Adoptive parents: Frank Benson; Virginia Benson
- Half-brothers: Lucas Jones (adoptive)
- Half-sisters: B. J. Jones (adoptive); Nelle Benson (adoptive)
- Husband: A. J. Quartermaine (1999–2000); Sonny Corinthos (2000–2005; 2007; 2015–2022) (Note: They were married consecutively from 2000 to 2005.); Lorenzo Alcazar (2005); Jasper Jacks (2007–2013); Jason Morgan (2021)
- Sons: Michael Corinthos; Morgan Corinthos
- Daughters: Josslyn Jacks; Donna Corinthos
- Grandsons: Wiley Quartermaine-Corinthos
- Granddaughters: Amelia Corinthos; Daisy Gilmore
- Aunts and uncles: Pat Spencer; Luke Spencer
- Nephews: Jonah Corinthos (adoptive)
- First cousins: Lucky Spencer; Ethan Lovett; Valerie Spencer; Lulu Spencer

Carly Corinthos (also Spencer) is a fictional character from General Hospital, a soap opera on the ABC network, portrayed by Laura Wright from 2005. A collaborative effort between the writers, Carly – originally played by Sarah Joy Brown from 1996 to 2001 — was introduced under executive producer Wendy Riche. A "love to hate" character who brings excitement to storylines because of her devious ways, Carly is the illegitimate daughter of former bad girl turned heroine, Bobbie Spencer (Jacklyn Zeman).

Carly seduces her mother's husband for revenge. Throughout the 2000s, Carly, then Tamara Braun from 2001 to 2005, goes on to become one of the show's most prominent, vital and popular characters largely due to her supercouple pairing with mobster Sonny Corinthos (Maurice Benard) and her friendship with Jason Morgan (Steve Burton). Carly's revenge on Bobbie and her near-lethal vendetta against A. J. Quartermaine (Sean Kanan/Billy Warlock) — the biological father of her son Michael (Chad Duell/Rory Gibson) – remain two of the most revered and controversial plots in the show's history.

While Brown's portrayal of Carly is viewed as a "duplicitous vixen," Braun's Carly is viewed as more of a romantic heroine. With Laura Wright in the role, Carly goes from being a pampered wife to being powerful business woman while embodying the qualities of her predecessors. Sarah Brown earned three Daytime Emmy Awards for her portrayal of Carly—two in the Outstanding Younger Actress in a Drama Series category and one in Outstanding Supporting Actress in a Drama Series category. Braun earned an Emmy nomination Outstanding Lead Actress in a Drama Series in 2004. The role of Carly would bring Laura Wright her first Emmy nomination overall – in the Outstanding Lead Actress and her first win, 20 years after breaking into daytime television on ABC's Loving.

== Storylines ==
=== Backstory ===
Carly was born in Florida to 16-year-old prostitute Bobbie Spencer (Jacklyn Zeman) and given up for adoption at birth. She was adopted by Frank and Virginia Benson and named Caroline Leigh Benson. Frank left when Caroline was young and she was raised by Virginia, who was an emotionally abusive alcoholic. She was best friends with Carly Roberts and had an affair with Carly's father. After Carly was severely injured in a car accident, Caroline stole her identity and moved to Port Charles. Carly blames Bobbie for ruining her life by giving her up to an awful woman like Virginia (even though Bobbie was not aware of who adopted her baby). She is determined to destroy Bobbie's life by any means necessary.

=== 1990s ===
Villainess Carly (Sarah Joy Brown) arrives in town and ingratiates herself into Bobbie's life when she enrolls in the nursing program at General Hospital. Meanwhile, Carly also begins sleeping with amnesiac Jason Morgan (Steve Burton). At first, they agree to only sex with no names and no feelings, but Jason and Carly soon develop a close friendship.

Carly gets her revenge when seduces Bobbie's husband Doctor Tony Jones (Brad Maule). Bobbie's brother Luke Spencer (Anthony Geary) uncovers Carly's true identity and warns to stop hurting her mother. Bobbie however discovers the affair on her wedding anniversary to Tony, making the two bitter enemies.

Carly genuinely falls in love with Tony and she moves in with him. After a fight with Tony, Carly has a drunken one-night stand with Jason's troubled brother A. J. Quartermaine (Sean Kanan) and ends up pregnant. Carly tells Tony he is the father, but when she overhears him saying he is only staying with her because of the baby, Carly convinces Jason to claim the child as his own. Carly gives birth to her son in December 1997 whom Jason names Michael after his best friend, mobster Sonny Corinthos (Maurice Benard). Jason has Michael christened, with Emily and Mike are the godparents.

The Quartermaines show up and after much heated discussion Robin convinces Jason to let them stay. Carly shows up near the end but chooses to sit in the back. Carly has a hard time bonding with Michael, but Jason takes care of him and has invited Bobbie into their lives to be the baby's nurse. During a terrible winter storm, Bobbie and Carly find themselves alone in the penthouse and Bobbie tells Carly how much she loved her baby.

It snaps Carly out of her depression and she is ready to hold Michael. The two women rush to the restaurant where Jason and Michael are with Emily and Mike. When Carly takes Michael in her arms, she is overwhelmed and tells Bobbie she is her daughter Caroline. Bobbie doesn't believe her until Virginia Benson (Carly's adoptive Mom) arrives and then Carly's story is confirmed. Carly continues to argue with her adoptive mother (and Tony) over the choices she has made. Virginia gets very upset and tries to leave but collapses on the floor and is rushed to General Hospital, where she later dies. Her doctor warned her about making the trip due to her prior ailment. Carly is devastated and feels like she has lost the only woman that truly loved her.

Tony later kidnaps Michael to protect him from Jason and Sonny's dangerous lifestyle. When Tony manages to avoid prosecution, Carly shoots him and fakes insanity to avoid prison time and ends up being committed. Jason helps get her released and Jason's girlfriend Robin Scorpio (Kimberly McCullough), fed up with Carly being so dependent on Jason, exposes Michael's true paternity.

Jason fears his hatred of A.J. will hurt Michael and signs away all rights; however, he remains an integral part of Michael's life. Jason comforts Elizabeth Webber (Rebecca Herbst) over the supposed death of her boyfriend, Lucky Spencer (Jonathan Jackson). Carly misunderstands their relationship, and sleeps with Sonny. Jason is unable to deal with the betrayal of Sonny and Carly, and leaves town.

=== 2000s ===
In early 2000, after Carly reveals she is pregnant by Sonny as a result of the one night stand, Sonny coerces A. J. into divorcing Carly and signing away his parental rights to Michael. In May 2000, Carly suffers a miscarriage when she falls down the stairs during a confrontation with A. J. Carly and Sonny bond over their loss and they marry in September 2000. Carly and Sonny realize they are truly in love and renew their wedding vows on February 23, 2001. Carly (now Tamara Braun) later tries to force Sonny out of the mob and he divorces her for it. Carly befriends Sonny's sister Courtney Matthews (Alicia Leigh Willis) and supports her relationship with Jason. Still in love with Sonny, Carly is hopeful they can reconcile until she finds him in bed with his attorney Alexis Davis (Nancy Lee Grahn) and a distraught Carly is presumed dead after a car accident. Upon Carly's return, she and Sonny remarry only for Sonny's vengeful brother Ric Lansing (Rick Hearst) to drug Carly and make it look like they slept together. In October 2003, Ric kidnaps a pregnant Carly only for her to escape and be taken hostage by Lorenzo Alcazar (Ted King). As Alcazar helps Carly deliver her son Morgan, Sonny, believing she is in danger, shoots at Alcazar only for the bullet to hit Carly and render her comatose. Carly awakens and in the spring of 2004 meets her biological father John Durant (Corbin Bernsen) who is looking to send both Sonny and Alcazar to prison. When the two are trapped in an elevator together, Alexis tells Carly that Sonny is her daughter Kristina's father. Carly keeps quiet fearing she might lose Sonny only to confess it later when the Kristina is deathly ill. Feeling betrayed, Sonny divorces Carly again but she agrees to be Kristina's godmother despite their differences.

After the divorce, Carly starts seeing Alcazar but her happiness is short lived due to A. J. kidnapping Michael (Dylan Cash), Kristina and Morgan. Michael is then presumed dead leaving Carly devastated. To complicate matters further, Carly (now Jennifer Bransford) discovers that Sonny's girlfriend Reese Marshall (Kari Wührer) is actually her presumed dead best friend—Carly Roberts. While Michael is revealed to be alive, the stress leads to Carly suffering a nervous breakdown, marrying Alcazar and ending up in a mental hospital. Upon her release and after she divorces Alcazar, Carly (Laura Wright) mourns the loss of her best friend Courtney who dies during child birth and becomes a partner in the Metro Court Hotel with Courtney's ex-husband Jasper Jacks (Ingo Rademacher). Carly offers to help Jax raise Courtney's son John only for Robin to expose that Nikolas Cassadine (Tyler Christopher) is actually the boy's real father. Carly and Jax bond over the loss and become engaged. However, their wedding plans are halted when Carly must marry Sonny again to keep from testifying against him. In February 2007, Jax's estranged brother Jerry Jacks (Sebastian Roché) holds several guests including Sonny and Carly hostage in the hotel lobby before blowing it up. Carly and Sonny make love after the ordeal only for Carly to divorce him and marry Jax on April 27, 2007. In 2008, Carly gets pregnant only to miscarry after she and Michael get caught in an explosion. When Michael is falls into a coma after taking a bullet meant for Sonny, Carly seduces Sonny into signing over his parental rights to their sons. A furious Jax sleeps with Sonny's ex-girlfriend Kate Howard (Megan Ward) and Carly finds them together. As Michael (Drew Garrett) awakens from his coma suffering from severe anger issues in 2009, Carly discovers she is pregnant. Because the pregnancy is so high risk, Michael goes to live with the Quartermaine family. In October 2009, Sonny's wife Claudia Zacchara (also Sarah Brown) takes Carly hostage when it was revealed that she was behind Michael's shooting. Claudia plans to steal Carly's daughter Josslyn only for Michael to kill her.

=== 2010s ===
Carly, Jason and Sonny cover up the murder to protect Michael only for Sonny's cop son Dante Falconeri (Dominic Zamprogna) to expose the truth leading to Michael (Chad Duell) being sent to prison. A vengeful Carly pays Brook Lynn Ashton (Adrianne León) to seduce Dante destroy his relationship with her cousin Lulu Spencer (Julie Marie Berman) but her plan fails. Distraught over Michael, Carly and Sonny sleep together again and her marriage to Jax subsequently implodes. Carly's vendetta against Dante strengthens when Michael reveals he was raped in prison and she comes to accept Michael's relationship with ex-stripper Abby (Andrea Bogart) who helps him come clean. When Jason's rival Franco (James Franco) and threatens Carly's family, Shawn Butler (Sean Blakemore) becomes Carly's new bodyguard. When Jax bribes a court official to get sole custody of Josslyn, Carly turns to Sonny who plants drugs on Jax allowing Carly to get full custody. Jax tries to skip town with Josslyn but Shawn stops him and Josslyn returns home safely. Shawn comforts a devastated Carly after Jax is presumed dead when Sonny sabotages his plane and she sends Morgan (Aaron Refvem) to military school to keep him away from Sonny. Carly later learns Jax is alive but keeps the secret to protect him from Sonny only for an angry and bitter Michael to reveal her lies on New Year's Eve. Grateful to him for keeping Michael out of the mob, Carly starts seeing Johnny Zacchara (Brandon Barash). The romance is short lived due to his affair and eventually marriage to the mentally ill Kate (aka Connie Falconeri) (Kelly Sullivan). Carly finds comfort with publishing mogul Todd Manning (Roger Howarth) only to discover he knew about Johnny's marriage all along. Carly and Sonny are devastated by Jason's sudden death and even more shocked to discover A. J. (Sean Kanan) is alive. Todd and Carly reconcile and start dating only for her to dump him after she discovers his part in switching Jason's healthy son with stillborn child. In 2013, Jax returns revealing that he and Carly's divorce was never finalized. After the divorce, Franco (also Roger Howarth) resurfaces, Carly wants him gone and plots his murder with Franco. The plans go awry with Olivia Falconeri (Lisa LoCicero) gets shot instead. When everyone is led to believe Franco is Jason's long lost twin Carly falls for him and defends his past actions. Carly is shocked when Morgan (Bryan Craig) elopes with his girlfriend Kiki Jerome (Kristen Alderson). At Morgan and Kiki's wedding reception, Sonny grieving the loss of the recently murdered Connie reveals that Morgan tricked Kiki into marriage by lying about her paternity fearing he'd lose her to Michael. Carly and Olivia support Sonny and convince him to start taking his bipolar medication again. Carly is furious when Morgan a bitter Morgan starts sleeping with his mother-in-law Ava Jerome (Maura West) and working for the rival crime family. In January 2014, Carly is kidnapped by Franco's biological mother Heather Webber (Robin Mattson) who fakes Carly's death and frames Franco for her murder. Fortunately, Franco rescues Carly and they continue their relationship as Carly comforts Michael when A. J. is murdered. Carly and Franco later discover a recording which reveals that Sonny killed A. J. and Ava killed Connie. Carly gives the recording to Sonny who plots to kill Ava only for her to reveal that she is pregnant with either Sonny or Morgan's child. Keeping the secret from Michael draws Sonny and Carly closer and they start an affair despite her recent engagement to Franco. At the wedding, a bitter Franco exposes Sonny's part in A. J.'s murder destroying the entire family and landing Sonny in prison.

Carly stands by Sonny during his prison stint and they reunite upon his release from prison and Carly plans to help him raise his and Ava's daughter Avery only for a bitter Michael to take custody of her. Meanwhile, Carly befriends the mysterious Jake Doe (Billy Miller) much to Sonny's dismay. Just as Michael begins to thaw toward his parents and relinquishes custody of Avery, Carly and Sonny become engaged. Meanwhile, Sonny and Carly realize Morgan is in trouble and fear he might be bipolar like Sonny. On their wedding day, Sonny gets shot hours before the wedding and ends up paralyzed. Ava takes custody of Avery and Carly wants to marry Sonny immediately hoping it will help in the custody case. Sonny nearly dies during their first attempt at wedding and they finally remarry on October 14, 2015, at General Hospital surrounded by their entire family. In November 2015 everyone realizes Jake Doe is actually Jason Morgan thanks to Carly, Sam and Spinelli and it is revealed at Elizabeth and Jason's wedding. Carly makes it to the courtroom for Avery's custody case and later explains to Sonny, Morgan, Michael, Ric and Kiki what happened unaware Kiki ran her off the road when she was drunk driving the prior night. Carly and Sonny are devastated when Ava gains custody of Avery but Sonny is allowed supervised visitation, Sonny kind of blames Carly at first. Carly tells Michael about Jason. Carly and Sonny talk about the courtroom hearing and she finally tells Sonny that Jason is alive, Jason comes in and they all discuss things. Carly tries to get Liz to back off Jason so he can see if he wants to be with her or Sam but to let him make his own decision, sparking an argument between the two. Jason confronts Carly on this and tells her to stay out of his and Liz's relationship. Carly is relieved when the truth comes out in December 2015 that Liz knew who Jason was since the Nurse's Ball because it meant Jason wasn't wrapped around her finger any more. On December 24, 2015, The Corinthos-Davis-Falconeri clan all gathered for the holidays and took a family picture. In January 2016 Carly and Sonny attended Robin and Patrick's second wedding as Robin and Carly actually finally put their differences aside and hugged, as Robin did give her credit for always being good for Jason and Sonny and Carly thanked her for saving Jason's life. Sonny's new doctor Mayes was quite rude to Carly and Sonny voiced himself on that but Carly wanted this to work out and told him it was fine and she had to head to the Metro Court. Carly often voices with Michael how angry she is that Sabrina lied about having his baby and to Morgan to make sure he took his bipolar medications.

In late 2016, Carly is devastated after the death of Morgan. More tragedy follows when her adopted sister Nelle Benson (Chloe Lanier) appears and starts taking revenge on Carly, including marrying and having a child with Michael. In 2019, Carly gives birth to a daughter, Donna Corinthos.

== Creation ==
=== Casting ===
Brown, known for her appearance in the children's series VR Troopers, auditioned for the role of Carly in early 1996 opposite Burton, who played Jason. Brown won the role out of seven other actresses including Burton's real-life girlfriend. Despite her own reservations, Brown officially booked the role on February 18, 1996, her 21st birthday. Brown made her first appearance as Carly on April 5, 1996. In September 1999, Brown revealed to Soaps in Depth that she was contemplating renewing her contract so she could audition for pilot. Brown's plans to officially vacate the role were announced in January 2000. However, Brown extended her contract when the producers agreed to work around her schedule. In December 2000, Brown announced that she wanted to move on and the producers were contemplating a recast. Robin Christopher who played Skye Chandler on All My Children and Gina Tognoni — Kelly Cramer from One Life to Live — were both considered as Brown's replacement. The series was also suffering from the departures of several popular actors including Burton and Jonathan Jackson—who played Carly's cousin Lucky Spencer. Brown immediately denied rumors that a dispute with executive producer Jill Farren Phelps led to her departure. Brown filmed her final scenes in early April 2001, and made her final appearance on April 24.

"I really didn't know about the uproar, which was good. But I was informed about it before I started working. I thought to myself, 'Holy guacamole ... I'm going into something here. But all I can do is the best that I can.' I think on some level, a lot of people were waiting for me to fail."

— Braun on being a high profile recast (2001).

In April 2001, Braun was announced as a Carly recast and made her first appearance on May 2, 2001. Initial speculation that Braun was only temporary and the character was slated to be written out was put to rest as Braun was put on contract with the series. According to Phelps, recast was always an option, but it was easier said than done. Phelps told the New York Post that she wasn't interested in a recast, but did so out of necessity. Braun had previously appeared on Party of Five and Buffy the Vampire Slayer. The naturally brunette Braun even colored her hair blonde. Braun auditioned opposite Benard four times before booking the gig. Braun answered the casting call for the role of Sarah, which many assumed was a recast of Sarah Webber. In an interview with Soap Opera Digest from September 2001, Braun explained that "Right before booking this job, I had vowed to quit acting and just re-evaluate." After booking the role, Braun immediately did her research. They daytime newcomer admitted that she was nervous about replacing such a popular actress but welcomed the challenge. In early 2005, speculation grew over Braun's future with the soap due to Brown's recent exit from CBS' As the World Turns. In February 2005, it was announced that Braun had decided not to renew her contract and would vacate the role. Then president of ABC Daytime, Brian Frons admitted that he would love to have Brown back, but did not want to lose Braun. Braun made her final appearance April 15, 2005.

In late March 2005, it was announced that actress Bransford had been cast in the role of Carly. Phelps commented that it would be difficult but viewers would accept the recast as long as the actors made it work. Bransford beat out Melrose Place actress Jamie Luner for the role and The Bold and the Beautiful actress Sarah Buxton. Bransford made her first appearance on April 18, 2005. During Bransford's tenure, Shayne Lamas also made several guest appearances as a teenage Carly in several flashbacks. In September 2005, rumors circulated that Bransford had been let out of her contract with the series when a website claiming Bransford's official web site reported the news. It was also rumored that ABC had rehired Tamara Braun while some reported that the character would be written out completely. The news of Bransford's ousting was confirmed and a spokesperson said "Jennifer's casting in the role of Carly did not work out." The spokesperson praised Bransford as a "consummate actress" and wished her luck. Bransford filmed her final scenes on September 9, and made final appearance on October 5, 2005.

Wright, who had recently vacated the role of Cassie Layne Winslow on Guiding Light, was rumored to be on a short list of potential recast though Wright refused to comment. After an "exhaustive" search, ABC officially confirmed Wright's casting as the fourth actress to play the role of Carly. Frons commented: "Carly is a complex character and we are excited to bring Laura's talent, beauty and intelligence to this role." While Wright was sad to leave Guiding Light, she was excited to relocate to Los Angeles to play the role of Carly. "Wow! What a challenge" she said. Wright was due to begin filming in October after her deal with CBS expired. Wright made her debut on November 4, 2005. In November 2009, Wright announced on Twitter that she had re-signed with the soap for another four years, becoming the longest-tenured actress in the role. In July 2013, during the General Hospital Fan Club Weekend, it was reported that Wright extended her deal with the soap until 2017. In March 2014, it was announced that both Brown and Braun would reprise the role of Carly for the show's 51st anniversary on April 1, 2014, making cameo appearances alongside Wright. Eden McCoy portrayed a young Carly in flashback scenes for the April 8, 2020, episode.

=== Background ===
"Carly was coming to Port Charles for the purpose of haunting Bobbie and making her life miserable, out of supposed anger at having been 'abandoned' by her. But of course, she wasn't abandoned, she was given up for adoption, and the network and producers were rightly concerned that we might be 'sending the message' (that phrase that soap writers dread) either that adopted children were hateful and full of rage, or that their adoptive parents were neglectful or otherwise inadequate enough to instill this smoldering resentment of being adopted in their kids... I need not go on."

— Patrick Mulcahey on Carly (1999).

Officially, former head writers Claire Labine (1993–96) and Robert Guza, Jr. (1996–2000, 2002–11), along with script writers Karen Harris and Patrick Mulcahey, are said to have created the character of Carly. In 1999, writer Patrick Mulcahey noted that the character had been somewhat of a work in progress at first. Mulchey explained that she was different from most characters because "We were afraid of her." The character was quite a big deal and very important to the series—so important that one writer even quit over it. "The pitfalls are obvious," Mulcahey said and "I imagine Bob [Guza, the headwriter] promised Wendy [Riche, the executive producer] and ABC that we had no intention of falling into them" the scribe continued. However, the writers themselves had no clue who the character was supposed to be. "That may sound like a horrifying confession, but in daytime, a successful character is always a collaboration between the writers and the actor." Mulcahey said the writers discussed who they felt Carly, as a character, is and that "the actor finds certain other decisions have to be made and makes them, sparks fly between the actor and another actor, we see what's happening on-screen and start playing around with it in the writing- that's how a character takes shape". The variety of actresses that auditioned for the role implied that there was not any set direction for the character. Brown spent the first few months of her tenure crafting a backstory to explain her character's actions. According to her backstory, the character was scripted as being born on November 5, 1973, in Jacksonville, Florida to the 16-year-old prostitute Bobbie (Jacklyn Zeman) and immediately placed up for adoption because Bobbie could not care for her. The child is adopted by Virginia (Lois Nettleton) and her husband Frank Benson in Pensacola, Florida as Caroline Leigh Benson. Frank eventually walks out on his family and Virginia works so much that Caroline barely has a chance to develop a relationship with her. According to Brown, Virginia is always a bit cold and bitter toward Caroline. In her teen years, Caroline becomes best friends with Charlotte "Carly" Roberts (Kari Wührer). Carly's father Dan Roberts seduces the young Caroline destroying Carly's family and the girls friendship. Caroline then loses Carly who is presumably killed in a car crash.

== Development ==
Using the alias Carly Roberts, the character ingratiates herself into the life of her biological mother Bobbie Spencer (Jacklyn Zeman) through her enrollment in the student nursing program and they start to bond until Bobbie rejects her. Carly then seduces Bobbie's doctor husband Tony Jones and sets her sights on the couple's young son Lucas (Justin Cooper). In Carly's mind, the affair is Bobbie's karma for abandoning her. Carly wants from Bobbie what she feels she didn't get from her adoptive mother. As the affair dismantles a once happy marriage, Sarah Brown maintained Carly's intentions start off pure. With Bobbie shutting her out, Carly goes on the defensive and develops feelings for Tony which she is very reluctant to face. Though she knows the relationship is built on her lies of omission, Tony becomes the center of Carly's life. Meanwhile, Bobbie's brother Luke Spencer (Anthony Geary) recognizes a kindred spirit in his niece and "that excites him"—which is why he keeps the secret. As the walls feel like they are closing in on her, Carly becomes impulsive and self-destructive and has a one-night stand with the troubled alcoholic A. J. Quartermaine (Sean Kanan). According to Brown, the writing for Carly isn't to garner sympathy from viewers, but being aware her motives creates a certain intrigue.

== Reception ==
Brown's portrayal of Carly has been the subject of universal acclaim. In July 2020, Soaps.com ranked Wright's casting as the fifth all-time best recasts on a soap opera. Editor Charlie Mason cited that Wright "put yet another unique stamp on the part." In 2023, Charlie Mason from Soaps She Knows placed Carly at fourth place on his ranked list of General Hospital’s 40+ Greatest Characters of All Time, commenting "You know how you know that Carly is one of the all-time greats on General Hospital? The character’s withstood two and a half recasts (from Sarah Brown to Tamara Braun to, briefly, Jennifer Bransford, then Laura Wright) to remain an unstoppable force of nature, a freight train you’d be terrified to be in front of but more often than not find yourself willing to get behind." The following year, Mason included Carly in his list of the worst mothers in American soap operas, writing, "No matter how many of her children got kidnapped, shot at or killed, Sonny's moll refused to get unmarried from the Mob. Until, that is, the made man developed both a case of amnesia and the hots for another woman." Mason placed Carly 23rd on his ranked list of Soaps' 40 Most Iconic Characters of All Time, commenting, "No matter who's been walking the walk and talking the talk as Port Charles' foremost hellraiser, the spitfire has always left a trail of scorched earth in her wake".
