= Morgan Corinthos =

Fictional character from General Hospital

- General Hospital character
- Bryan Craig as Morgan Corinthos
- Portrayed by: Aaron Refvem (2009–2010); Aaron Sanders (2010–2011); Bryan Craig (2013–2024); (and others)
- Duration: 2003–2011; 2013–2016; 2018; 2024
- First appearance: October 24, 2003
- Last appearance: August 6, 2024
- Created by: Robert Guza, Jr. and Charles Pratt, Jr.
- Introduced by: Jill Farren Phelps (2003); Frank Valentini (2013, 2018, 2024)
- Book appearances: The Secret Life of Damian Spinelli
- Spin-off appearances: General Hospital: Night Shift
- Aaron Refvem as Morgan Corinthos

- Aaron Sanders as Morgan Corinthos
In-universe information
- Other names: Morgan Stone Corinthos; Morgan Benson (2011–13); Captain Morgan (online)
- Occupation: Barista (2016); Head of Renovation (2014); Mob soldier (2013–14)
- Family: Spencer
- Parents: Sonny Corinthos; Carly Corinthos
- Stepfather: Lorenzo Alcazar (2005); Jasper Jacks (2007–13)
- Stepmother: Claudia Zacchara (2008–09); Brenda Barrett (2011)
- Sisters: Donna Corinthos
- Half-brothers: Dante Falconeri; Michael Corinthos
- Half-sisters: Lila McCall; Kristina Davis; Josslyn Jacks; Avery Corinthos
- Wife: Kiki Jerome (2013)
- Grandfathers: Mike Corbin; John Durant; Frank Benson (adoptive)
- Grandmothers: Adela Corinthos; Bobbie Spencer; Virginia Benson (adoptive)
- Uncles: Ric Lansing; Lucas Jones (adoptive)
- Aunts: Courtney Matthews; B.J. Jones (adoptive); Nelle Benson (adoptive)
- Nephews: Gio Palmieri; Rocco Falconeri; Wiley Corinthos
- Nieces: Amelia Corinthos; Irene Davis-Ashford; Daisy Gilmore
- First cousins: Molly Lansing; Spencer Cassadine
- Other relatives: Luke Spencer; Lucky Spencer; Ethan Lovett; Lulu Spencer

Morgan Corinthos is a fictional character from the original ABC Daytime soap opera, General Hospital, last portrayed by Bryan Craig. Morgan is the first biological child of Sonny and Carly Corinthos.

The character was created under head writers, Robert Guza, Jr. and Charles Pratt, Jr. and introduced by executive producer Jill Farren Phelps, as a newborn on October 24, 2003. In 2009, the character is SORASed (rapidly aged) and the role was recast with actor Aaron Refvem in 2009, and later Aaron Sanders in 2010. The character is written out of the series in the summer of 2011 by head writer, Garin Wolf, and sent off to military school. Craig's Morgan is introduced in 2013 under head writer Ron Carlivati and executive producer, Frank Valentini, SORASed again. Craig left the soap in October 2016, and made a one-off appearances in January 2018 and August 2024, respectively.

Craig's performance has been met with critical acclaim, winning him the Daytime Emmy Award for Outstanding Younger Actor in a Drama Series in 2016 and 2017.

== Creation ==
=== Casting ===
Upon the character's onscreen birth, the role of Morgan was portrayed by twins, Isador Talamo and Adonios Talamo. Jordan and Dylan Cline then appeared in the role from 2004 to 2005. George Juarez stepped into the role in late 2005. Juarez last appeared as Morgan in April 2009. On May 12, 2009, Aaron Refvem made his first appearance as Morgan, regularly. In the spring of 2010, Refvem reported that he had landed a role in a prime time series, but said that he didn't expect it to interfere in his work schedule for GH. A day later, ABC released a statement that confirmed that Refvem had been replaced due to a scheduling conflict. Refvem departed from the series on May 4, 2010 leaving for a role in the pilot of This Little Piggy.

Aaron Sanders took over and first appeared on April 14, 2010. Sanders made his last appearance on July 21, 2011. In July 2012, Refvem revealed confirmed on Twitter the possibility of his return to the role of Morgan. Though the series never commented on Refvem's statement, head writer, Ron Carlivati hinted at the possibility. In December 2012, the series released a casting call for a white male, between the ages of 14 and 17. There was speculation that the character was a recast for the role of Morgan. In March 2013, it was reported that Drew Osborne had filmed scenes with Maurice Benard; Osborne's striking resemblance to Chad Duell led to speculation that he could be Morgan or a recast of Duell's character, Michael. Later, message board posters began reporting that Craig had been cast in the role of Morgan despite no official confirmation from ABC. On April 17, 2013, after months of speculation from fans, a rep from the show confirmed the news that Bryan Craig had been cast in the role of Morgan. Craig began filming his first scenes on April 15. Though no official airdate was announced, Craig's first appearance was slated for May 2013 on a contractual basis. Craig later revealed to Soap Opera Digest that he was hesitant to do a soap. However, the role of Morgan changed his mind about daytime. However, it was his parents who convinced him to sign a three-year contract. On the set of General Hospital, Craig met his real-life girlfriend, Kelly Thiebaud, who portrays Britt Westbourne.

In September 2016, it was revealed that Craig would be departing from the show, last appearing on October 31, 2016.

In January 2018, Craig made a guest appearance on the January 17 episode focused on Ava's surgery. In June 2024, it was announced Craig would reprise the role for one-episode, which aired on August 6 of the same year.

=== Characterization ===
The December 2012 casting call described the character as being "[s]oulful [and] complex" with "intensity beyond his years." Angela Durrell of TV Source described the character of Morgan as "[s]ensitive and emotionally wounded." Morgan craves "strong ties" and stability. Mara Levinsky described Craig's Morgan as "impulsive" and "imperfect." Michael Logan described Craig's Morgan as a "marvelous muddle of puppy awkwardness and testy testosterone." When asked about his character's "casual and low-key," wardrobe, despite his family being filthy rich, Craig said Morgan is all about quick cash, but "far from snooty." He is the kind of guy that sleeps all day, and eats pizza for breakfast. His sense of style reflects his laid-back personality. Susan Hornik described Craig's Morgan as a "Prince Harry-esque, bad boy."

== Development ==
=== Introduction (2003) ===
After overcoming the threat of Sonny's longtime love, Brenda Barrett (Vanessa Marcil), Sonny and Carly (Tamara Braun) reunite and plan to make Michael (Dylan Cash) a big brother. On February 4, 2003, Sonny and Carly make love for the first time since their reunion. GH writer, Elizabeth Korte wouldn't confirm or deny the pregnancy, but said that several events that had recently played out could make viewers think a baby is coming. ABC Soaps In Depth hinted that if Carly were pregnant, the child's birth would coincide with November Sweeps. This would be Sonny's first opportunity to witness the birth of one of his children. The series had recently introduced Sonny's vengeful brother, Ric Lansing (Rick Hearst) who takes an interest in the Corinthos clan, and Carly specifically. Ric drugs Carly on February 17/18 and leads her to believe they have slept together. Carly is unaware of her baby's paternity. Ric's wife Elizabeth (Rebecca Herbst) miscarries in May 2003 and he blames Sonny. Meanwhile, Sonny and Carly happily prepare for the birth of their child, as Ric obsesses over the miscarriage. He formulates a plan and buys a house with a secret panic room. Ric kidnaps Carly before her best friends' wedding and locks her in the panic room. Carly escapes only to be kidnapped by rival crime lord, Lorenzo Alcazar (Ted King). Carly goes into false labor, and is eventually rescued by Sonny, Jason and Ric himself. Meanwhile, the constant danger begins to remind Sonny of how he lost his first wife, Lily (Lilly Melgar) and their unborn child in a car explosion; Lily even appears to Sonny accusing him of putting the child in danger. Then head writer, Robert Guza revealed that Lily's prophecy would come true as Carly faces major complications while giving birth. In actuality the woman who appeared before Sonny was a prostitute named Marcella Montoya who was hired by Lorenzo to get plastic surgery look like Lily. All alone, Carly falls down a flight of stairs and goes into labor and she is discovered by Alcazar. Sonny mistakenly believes Alcazar is hurting Carly, and shoots him. The bullet is lodged in Carly's head, and she falls into a coma shortly after giving birth on October 24, 2003. Maurice Benard and Tamara Braun revealed to Soaps In Depth that the filming of the birth scenes felt extremely real. The eight-week-old infant was covered in a jelly like substance to make it look like a newborn. After the birth, Carly passes out from the gunshot wound, forcing Braun to play the rest of the scenes with her eyes closed. According to Braun, her connection with Benard was on a different level, and she felt the need to actually comfort him. Benard admitted that he became extremely emotional after the taping and couldn't stop crying. Those watching were also in tears. During a fan gathering in 2003, Tamara Braun had fans submit suggestions for the child's name. Braun and her co-star Maurice Benard looked through the names and presented some of the suggestions to the writers. The character is named for his godfather Jason Morgan (Steve Burton), and the late Stone Cates (Michael Sutton); who died from AIDS as a teenager.

=== Preteen years (2009–11) ===
With Refvem's casting, the character was aged from 8 to 12 years of age. Upon the return of Robin Christopher's Skye Chandler in 2010, some hoped that the series would age her daughter, Lila Rae Alcazar, and make her a love interest for Morgan. The potential romance would definitely cause trouble considering Lila Rae's father, the late Lorenzo Alcazar (Ted King) was once Sonny's most formidable opponent. Instead of taking the young character in a romantic direction, Morgan develops a relationship with mob soldier Dominic Pirelli (Dominic Zamprogna) when he saves him from being hit by a car at the General Hospital carnival. The two then bond over baseball only for Dominic to be shot by Sonny who discovers he is an undercover cop. It is then revealed that Dominic is actually Sonny's son, Dante Falconeri, which complicates his relationship with Morgan a bit more. Morgan is later forced to testify against his father during a murder trial and he is put in the position of having to choose between saving his father, or revealing the truth about his brother Michael's part in their stepmother Claudia (Sarah Brown)'s murder. Though Dante manages to protect Morgan, he then controversially tricks Morgan into revealing Michael's whereabouts. The character is written off-canvas in the summer of 2011.

=== Return (2013) ===
With Craig's casting, the character of Morgan was rapidly aged to 19 years old. Morgan "will be bring trouble in his wake!" said Soap Opera Digest. The character's "reintegration" would be anything but smooth. Michael Fairman of On-Air On-Soaps questioned "Just what will Morgan's disposition be [l]ike when he returns to Port Charles?" due to Sonny and Carly being his parents. Regan Cellura of Daytime Confidential reported that Morgan runs into trouble in the mob. The departing Brandon Barash, who played Johnny Zacchara alerts Connie Falconeri (Kelly Sullivan) of Morgan's predicament. According to head writer, Ron Carlivati, the canvas was ripe for Morgan's return. While attending Vanderbilt University, Morgan wracks up some gambling debts putting his loved ones in danger; while Morgan hides out, his roommate, Travis (Drew Osborne) is left to fend for himself. Though he barely escapes with his life, Morgan appears to have developed a gambling addiction, much like his grandfather, Mike Corbin (Ron Hale). In June 2013, Craig is injured with a broken arm and the writers decide to write the injury in. Initial rumors had Morgan being attacked by debt collectors; however, the injury is instead scripted as a wrestling move gone wrong with Alice Gunderson (Bergen Williams). It appears that Morgan had overcome his gambling addiction.

=== Romantic triangle ===
On May 14, 2013, it is revealed that Morgan and Kiki have been dating. Kiki and Morgan's relationship is immediately met with opposition due to her involvement in his gambling. A Soapnet promo indicated that Alderson's Kiki could potentially drive a wedge between Michael and Morgan. Morgan is usually being protected by Michael, but now that he's older and he wants to prove to Kiki that he's a good catch, "a 'perfect' big brother is not what Morgan needs." Carlivati explained that Morgan is the Prince Harry to Michael's Prince William. Morgan is all about having fun which and the responsible Michael sees Morgan as acting like a "screw-up". Craig told Soap Opera Digest that Morgan notices the tension between Kiki and Michael but he had yet to understand how far their relationship had progressed. Though Morgan rushes Kiki into marriage, and he is truly in love with her, Morgan needs to keep her away from Michael. In August 2013, Craig said that he did not know who Kiki would end up with but knew for sure that any future romance between Michael and Kiki would drive a wedge between the brothers. When Michael's biological father, A. J. Quartermaine (Sean Kanan) becomes the prime suspect in the murder of Sonny's girlfriend, it causes even more tension; Morgan immediately wants to come forward about finding A. J.'s gun, while Kiki wants to spare Michael's feelings. Morgan's need for "justice" is fueled by his jealousy. Craig admitted that the storyline made things a bit awkward due to the fact that Duell and Alderson were dating in real life. However, Morgan and Kiki's relationship is doomed from the start. An unstable Sonny, decides to expose that Morgan knew the truth of about Kiki's paternity before he married her. Morgan is humiliated. The stage is set to put Morgan at odds with his entire family, including his father played by Emmy winner Maurice Benard. The fall out also culminates in Morgan falling into bed with his mother-in-law, Ava Jerome (Maura West).

== Storylines ==
Morgan is christened in December 2003, with Jason and Sonny's sister Courtney Matthews (Alicia Leigh Willis) as his godparents. He later attends a private Catholic school, Queen of Angels. In March 2005, Morgan and his siblings, Kristina and Michael are temporarily kidnapped by A. J. Quartermaine (then Billy Warlock), but are rescued by Jason and his then girlfriend, Sam McCall (Kelly Monaco). Carly marries Jasper Jacks (Ingo Rademacher) in April 2007 after the Metro Court Hotel hostage crisis occurred by Jax's brother Jerry Jacks (Sebastian Roché). He and Morgan form a close bond and Jax considers Morgan his own. In August 2010 Morgan goes to see Sonny, despite his mother's wishes. Sonny talks with him, until Carly arrives. Carly sends Morgan home, and explains to Sonny that she is making up for past mistakes with Michael; she does not want Morgan to be around Sonny, due to his violent life. Carly asks her husband, Jax to adopt Morgan, and he agrees; however, they are unable to complete the process before Jax disappears. In late December 2010 and early January 2011 Morgan, Molly (Haley Pullos), Kristina (Lexi Ainsworth), Michael (Chad Duell) and other Port Charles residents are on their way to a ski resort when the bus crashes. Morgan is thrown from the bus and separated from the others with a broken leg. He later attends Sonny and Brenda's wedding and Carly allows Morgan to begin having contact with Sonny again. In July, Morgan and Molly kidnap his sister Josslyn in an attempt to stop Jax from taking Josslyn away from Carly upon their divorce; however the plan fails when Kristina discovers them. In the summer 2011, after Jax is presumed dead in a plane crash, Carly enrolls Morgan in military school to protect him from Sonny's influence, using her maiden name, "Benson". According to Carly, Morgan is relieved that he no longer has to live with the stigma of being a mobster's son, and he is adjusting well at school.

In 2013, Morgan (Craig) is found to be living with his girlfriend Kiki Jerome (then Kristen Alderson) and his girlfriend's mother Ava Jerome (Maura West) in New York City, where Michael tracks him down after he is attacked and left for dead. Sonny steps in to protect Morgan from another beating and Morgan moves in with Michael after Kristina (Lindsey Morgan) started enrolling in Wesleyan University. Kiki also moves in the brothers and Morgan notices the sexual tension between them. He is relieved when the two are revealed to be cousins, and Morgan and Kiki move into the Quartermaine boat house. Morgan eventually learns that Kiki and Michael aren't related, but withholds the information. Morgan confesses the truth to Sonny and convinces him to keep the secret while he marries Kiki. Though Kiki's paternity is exposed, the couple has already married. Even when at odds, Morgan and Michael come together to rescue Sonny when his girlfriend Connie is murdered. At Kiki and Morgan's wedding party, Sonny breaks down and reveals that Morgan knew about Kiki's paternity before they married. Following the revelation, Morgan begins sleeping with Ava. Morgan later moves in with Ava, against his family's wishes. Morgan accidentally discovers that Ava, and her brother, Julian Jerome (William deVry) are going after his Sonny's crime organization and is forced to turn against Sonny in exchange for his life. However, Morgan uses the situation as a way to get revenge on his father and brother. Eventually, Sonny figures out the truth, but Morgan refuses to back down from working with the Jeromes. In a shootout, though, Morgan ends up accidentally shooting Max Giambetti (Derk Cheetwood), Sonny's bodyguard who helped raise Morgan. Seeing the danger of his actions, Morgan tries to get out of the business, but Julian threatens to kill Carly and Michael if Morgan doesn't spy on him. Sonny, though, figures out Julian's scheme and gets Morgan out. Ava is reluctant to give Morgan up, and provides Sonny info on Julian to prove her loyalty.

== Reception ==
=== Early recasts ===
Jen Snyder of TV Source was relieved that the "much anticipated" aging had finally come upon the announcement of Refvem's casting. Refvem was an immediately hit with fans and critics alike. In October 2009, Soapnet listed the young actor as the "Performer of the Week" for the week of September 28, 2009 for Morgan's toast at the wedding of Damian Spinelli and Maxie Jones. The article categorized Refvem as one of the best child actors in daytime and described his performance as "the very definition of adorable." Refvem was applauded for his performance in February 2010 in which his character Morgan attempted to play peacemaker between his new brother, Dante and his uncle Jason despite the fact that Dante was trying to send their father to prison. His work was considered "Emmy" worthy. In 2010, Refvem was nominated by The Young Artist Foundation for the "Best Performance in a TV Series by a Recurring Younger Actor, 13 years old and younger." Upon Refvem's departure, Sara Bibel of Deep Soap said she hoped his replacement would be just as talented but commented how weird it would be considering the role of Morgan's brother had also been recast. An article on Soapnet.com described Refvem's tenure as "adorably excellent" and referred to the news of his departure as "bittersweet." The piece also applauded Refvem for being able to hold his own opposite veterans such as Maurice Benard as Sonny, Laura Wright as Carly, and Dominic Zamprogna as Dante. Soaps In Depth urged the already angry fans not to blame ABC for Refvem's ousting because it was beyond their control.

Soap Central's Tamilu had a tough time accepting Sanders in the role and explained that Drew Garrett's ousting as Michael was already enough for viewers to deal with, and losing a beloved actor like Refvem was a bit shocking. She said the climactic scenes in which Morgan discovered Michael's prison sentence kind of fell flat due to the sudden recast. However, the user praised Refvem for being able to "cry at the drop of a hat" and said that he oozed sincerity. With the installation of new head-writer Garin Wolf, some advised the scribe to bring Refvem back as Morgan. Despite some mixed reviews early on, other critics began to accept Sanders as the "NuMorgan." Michael Fairman applauded Sanders for his performance during a scene in February 2011 in which Morgan learned of Carly and Jax's separation. Fairman said Sanders "delivered a very real and emotional moment." Sanders was also nominated for a Young Artist Award for his portrayal of Morgan in February 2011.

=== Bryan Craig ===
According to head writer, Ron Carlivati, fans had been asking for Morgan's return since early 2012. "Morgan finally returns!" said Michael Fairman of Craig's casting referring to the character's 2-year absence. TV Source Magazine described Craig's May 8 debut as Morgan as the episode's "big surprise" considering it coincided with the much anticipated debut of Emmy winner Maura West as Ava Jerome. Michael Fairman said, "lo and behold" of Craig's surprising debut. Bryan Craig was a hit with his cast mates and fans. Though his portrayal of Morgan initially received mixed reviews, a lot of viewers eventually came to enjoy Craig in the role, despite Morgan's actions. The confrontation scenes at Morgan and Kiki's wedding party were praised in Soap Opera Digest. A viewer from Minnesota said Craig had finally grown into the role and also praised the writers for addressing Sonny's favoritism of Michael. Craig ranked at #1 on Daytime Confidential's list of the "10 Best Soap Opera Newbies" in the year 2013. The praised Craig for his portrayal of Morgan and said the actor "engaged in a delicate dance of pathos and mania" when Morgan begs Sonny to keep the secret about Kiki's paternity. The website said Craig would have a future as an Emmy winner.

Craig received a Daytime Emmy Award nomination in the Outstanding Younger Actor in a Drama Series category for his portrayal of Morgan in 2014 and 2015, before winning the award in 2016.

=== Relationships ===
When Craig and West shared their first scenes, Daytime Confidential encouraged a potential romance due to the chemistry between the two actors. 76% of voters hoped the two would eventually hook up. Morgan's shocking romance with his mother-in-law Ava was a hit with many fans and critics alike and garnered the portmanteau "AMor". The pairing also made TV Guide's "HOT LIST" for the year 2013. The magazine said, "...nothing prepped us for such illicit cougar love... or how much we'd dig it!" Of the pairing, Michael Logan said, "It's so wrong, it's right." Mara Levinsky praised Craig for his portrayal of Morgan following his first tryst with Ava. The plot twist also resulted in the character's name trending for several consecutive days on Twitter. A poll on Daytime Confidential saw 73% of voters wanted to see more of Morgan and Ava's relationship. The couple ranked at #4 on Daytime Confidential's list of the "10 Best Soap Opera Couples" for the year. "If General Hospital bottled the chemistry shared by mob legacies Ava Jerome (Maura West) and Morgan Corinthos (Bryan Craig), the soap would be able to sustain a $100 million annual operating budget."
