= Sonny Corinthos and Carly Benson =

Sonny and Carly
- General Hospital character
- Maurice Benard and Laura Wright as Sonny and Carly (2015)
- Duration: 1999–2008; 2010; 2014–2022
- Created by: Robert Guza, Jr.
- Introduced by: Wendy Riche
In-universe information
- Other names: SnC, S&C, CarSon
- Family: Corinthos; Spencer
- Spouse: 2000–2001; 2001–2005; 2007; 2015–2022
- Children: Michael Corinthos; Morgan Corinthos; Donna Corinthos
- Grandchildren: Wiley Cooper-Jones; Amelia Corinthos; Daisy

Michael "Sonny" Corinthos, Jr. and Caroline Leigh "Carly" Benson are fictional characters of the long running ABC daytime soap opera, General Hospital and also a supercouple. Sonny is the most powerful mobster in Port Charles, New York and Carly is the daughter of one of the show's popular characters, Bobbie Spencer, and the niece of soap opera supercouple, Luke and Laura.

Sonny is played by Maurice Benard and Carly is currently played by Laura Wright. Sonny and Carly were together, on and off, from December 1999 to April 2007. They have been married four times and reunited in 2008, 2010 and most recently in 2014. Together, the couple share seven children; Michael, Dante, Josslyn, Kristina, Avery, Morgan and Donna. The couple has had their ups and downs, but throughout it all they have remained friends and support one another. Their relationship is normally characterized as being explosive and tumultuous. They are known by fans as "S&C" and the portmanteau "CarSon" for Carly and Sonny.

== Writing ==
The character of Sonny had been in various relationships with various women before the writers paired him with Carly. The only other character Sonny was paired with that reached the same level of popularity as Sonny and Carly is Sonny's pairing with Brenda Barrett (Vanessa Marcil). Sonny and Brenda are also considered a Supercouple. Because both women have played such major parts in Sonny's life, Carly and Brenda have always clashed.

However, Sonny was on the show for years before Carly's arrival. And it wasn't until November 1999, when writers first tested their on-screen chemistry. Carly at the time was married to A. J. Quartermaine (Billy Warlock) and in love with A.J.'s brother and Sonny's best friend and mob enforcer, Jason Morgan (Steve Burton). If Benard's success with Marcil wasn't enough proof that his pairing with Carly would be a success, the history between their families would be. Sonny's close friend is none other than Luke Spencer (Anthony Geary). Luke is one half of the most iconic Supercouple in the soap genre, Luke and Laura and is also the brother of Carly's biological mother, Bobbie Spencer (Jacklyn Zeman).

== Storyline ==
Sonny and Carly (Maurice Benard and then-Sarah Brown)

Sonny Corinthos is reeling from the betrayal of his most recent lover and on November 26, 1999, has a one-night stand with Carly Quartermaine, the wife of A. J. Quartermaine (Billy Warlock). After A.J.'s brother and Carly's lover, Jason Morgan leaves town, Carly learns she is pregnant and A.J. begins blackmailing her. On May 22, 2000 during an argument with A.J., Carly ends up falling down the stairs at the Quartermaine Mansion and suffers a miscarriage. Sonny then finds criminal evidence against A.J. and forces him into granting Carly a divorce in July 2000 and they move in together. The two bond over the loss of their child and Sonny also becomes a father figure to Carly & A.J.'s son, Michael. Carly later gets involved in Sonny's criminal business when she tries to get Joseph Sorel arrested. However, when Carly overhears something she shouldn't, Sonny and Carly get married on September 18 to keep Carly from testifying against Sonny. Sonny and his lawyer, Alexis Davis (Nancy Lee Grahn) later get Zander Smith, Sorel's former henchman, released from prison, hoping to use his testimony to put Sorel away. However, Sorel finds out about their plan and has Sonny shot in front of the police station in December 2000 where he almost dies, but thanks to Carly's persistence with the doctor's Sonny recovers. After the chaos begins to settle, Carly and Sonny admit that they were truly in love and renew their vows on February 21, 2001 in Martinique.

Sonny and Carly (Maurice Benard and then-Tamara Braun)

In the summer of 2001, after a bomb is delivered to their penthouse, Carly teams up with federal agents to get Sonny into the witness protection program, hoping to save him. However, Sonny sees this as Carly betraying him once again and can't forgive. After breaking it off with Carly, Sonny is stabbed at the grave of his first wife, Lily but he survives. When Carly and Alexis are taken hostage by Sorel at Sonny's penthouse, Sonny sets off a bomb, but he is okay. He must redecorate the house and Carly believes that they can work things out. However, Sonny still can't get past Carly's betrayal and their divorce is finalized in November. Despite the divorce, Sonny agrees to adopt Michael as his own son. Meanwhile, Sonny and Alexis had a brief affair and Sonny is irate when A.J. marries his paternal half-sister, Courtney Matthews (Alicia Leigh Willis). Carly gets jealous when she sees Sonny with his former lover, Brenda Barrett (Vanessa Marcil). Carly also finds trouble after she is drugged one of Sonny's enemies, Faith Rosco and ends up in the bed with her business partner, Ric Lansing (Rick Hearst). Soon Carly tells Sonny she is pregnant and doesn't know who the father is. Sonny and Carly learn that Ric was actually Sonny's maternal half-brother and had come to town to destroy Sonny's life, blaming Sonny for their mother's death. While preparing for the birth of their child, Sonny and Carly would also stand in as witnesses for Jason and Courtney's wedding. But the wedding is put on hold after Carly is kidnapped and Sonny must work with federal agents to save her. Carly was being held captive by Ric who had planned to steal her baby and give it to his wife, Elizabeth (Rebecca Herbst). By the time Sonny and Jason get to Ric's home, Carly has been taken hostage by Lorenzo Alcazar (Ted King), the twin brother of the late Luis. Carly's release depended on whether he allowed a shipment of drugs to go through his territory which he reluctantly agrees to. But Lorenzo still hadn't released Carly which led to himself, Jason & Courtney ambushing Alcazar on his yacht and rescuing Carly. But Lorenzo became obsessed with Carly and plotted to get her for himself by hiring a prostitute who resembled Sonny's late wife Lily. "Lily" warns Sonny that he is a danger to Carly and their baby and to keep them safe, Sonny buys Carly her own home, for herself, Michael and their baby.

In October 2003, Sonny realized that he was being tricked and goes to the house to tell Carly, but hears her screaming instead. Believing she is being hurt, Sonny puts a bullet through Alcazar and accidentally shoots Carly in the head and must deliver their son, Morgan. Carly fell into a brief coma while Sonny decided to get out the mob to protect his family. However, while in her coma, Carly had dreams about Lorenzo and she realized she had feelings for him. Sonny attempted to shoot Alcazar and left town with Sam McCall (Kelly Monaco). Sonny explained his situation to Sam who told him not to give up Carly and their children so easily. When Sonny is arrested and put on trial, Carly tries to get Sonny to run but to be a good example to his children; he turns himself in and fortunately is found not guilty. Another one of Sonny's enemies, Faith Rosco drugs Carly and has her committed to Shadybrooke and then brainwashed her to hate Sonny. Lorenzo rescues Carly and she eventually admits that she has feelings for him and Sonny. Feeling betrayed, Sonny begins having sex with Sam.

By the time Carly and Sonny were able to reconcile, Sam reveals she is pregnant. Jason and Sonny decide to alter the paternity test to make it appear that Jason was the child's father. Meanwhile, Alexis's young daughter, Kristina Ashton becomes sick and is in need of a bone marrow transplant. Alexis shocks Sonny by revealing that Kristina is his daughter and that Carly had been keeping the secret. Alexis begged Sam to induce her labor so the baby could donate her stem cells for Kristina but Sam refused. The stress caused Sam to go into premature labor and their baby was stillborn in November 2004. While feuding with his brother, Faith Rosco kidnapped Sonny's children. Morgan and Kristina were eventually returned home but Michael wasn't and he was presumed dead. Faith's partner in crime would turn out to be A. J. Quartermaine and Michael was eventually reunited with his family. Detective Reese Marshall (Kari Wuhrer), the woman assigned to the Corinthos case would stay in town under the orders of John Durant (Corbin Bernsen) who turned out to be Carly's biological father. John instructed Reese to find evidence on Sonny. Sonny and Reese had a brief relationship while Carly began losing her grip on reality. Sonny briefly enters into a relationship with Jason's sister Emily Quartermaine (Natalia Livingston), who is upset that her husband Nikolas Cassadine (Tyler Christopher) has become involved with Sonny's sister Courtney Matthews (Alicia Leigh Willis). During this time Emily forces Sonny to confront his bipolar disorder. Fearing for Emily's safety, Sonny stages a kiss with Carly, who has in turn asserted her independence and is starting a business relationship with Jasper Jacks (Ingo Rademacher). When a deadly outbreak of encephalitis hits Port Charles, several residents die. Among them is Courtney, who gives birth to John Michael Jacks/Spencer Cassadine right before her death. Sonny and Emily attempt a relationship in secret, but when their relationship goes public, Sonny, fearing changes from his bipolar medication and for her safety, again ends things.

Sonny still in love with ex-wife Carly discovers Jax and Carly become engaged, though she is disappointed when he leaves town to help his wayward brother Jerry Jacks (Sebastian Roche). Preying on this, Sonny is caught in a legal dilemma when Carly witnesses him shoot Lorenzo Alcazar (Ted King) in self-defense, and forces her to marry him temporarily on January 16, 2007. While attending a party at the hotel she owns with Jax, Carly and several other Port Charles residents are taken hostage by the mysterious Jerry Jacks. Sonny declares his love for Carly, and when the two survive the hostage crisis, they have sex. Sonny is heart broken when Carly divorces in April 2007 to marry Jax.

Throughout the years, Carly and Sonny have gone through many trials and tribulations, including the shooting and coma of their son, Michael Corinthos. When Sonny decides to get out of the mob for the safety of his children, Jason will only agree to take over if Sonny signs away his parental rights to Michael and Morgan; to get him to agree, Carly later seduces him. In 2011, when Carly and Jax are divorcing, Jax plans on taking their daughter, Josslyn away from Carly permanently. To ensure that Josslyn stays with her mother, Sonny frames Jax for drug possession. When Carly finds out that Sonny caused Jax's plane to crash at a swamp, she got so furious that she officially cut Sonny out of her life and sent Morgan, her and Sonny's son, to military school to keep him away from Sonny. As of August 18, 2011, she no longer has respect, love, or care for Sonny and even turned against him by siding with Johnny Zacchara, her current boyfriend and Sonny's archrival. When Sonny was shot six months later, she realized that she still has some caring left for Sonny, but still believes that she won't protect him from the police. About three months later, she finds out that Johnny only used her to get to Sonny by having sex with Kate (with D.I.D)-Sonny's girlfriend. She attempted to get back at him by seducing Sonny to have sex with her, but Sonny refuses since he believes its no use. As of August 19, 2014, Sonny and Carly begin having an affair and redrawing the love they have for each other. Sonny and Carly remarried for the fifth time on October 14, 2015. On September 30, 2019, Sonny and Carly welcomed a daughter they named Donna Courtney Corinthos.

== Reception ==
Sonny and Carly were listed as one of the best soap couples of the decade in 2009. They were included on the Soaps In Depth 100 Hottest Couples List in 2008. In 2009, the couple was listed as one of the favorite supercouples of All Time. In 2023, Charlie Mason from Soaps She Knows placed Carly and Sonny at fourth and fifth place, respectively, on his ranked list of General Hospital's 40+ Greatest Characters of All Time.
