= Michael Corinthos =

Fictional character from General Hospital

- General Hospital character
- Rory Gibson as Michael Corinthos
- Portrayed by: Dylan Cash (2002–2008); Drew Garrett (2009–2010); Chad Duell (2010–2025); Robert Adamson (2022, 2024); Rory Gibson (2025–present); (and others)
- Duration: 1997–present
- First appearance: December 29, 1997
- Created by: Robert Guza, Jr.
- Introduced by: Wendy Riche (1997); Jill Farren Phelps (2009); Frank Valentini (2022, 2024–2025)
- Spin-off appearances: General Hospital: Night Shift
- Drew Garrett as Michael Corinthos

- Chad Duell as Michael Corinthos
In-universe information
- Other names: Michael Morgan; Michael Corbin; Edward Quartermaine; Michael Alan Quartermaine (2014–2017)
- Occupation: Businessman; General Hospital board member; Restaurant manager; Coffee warehouse manager; Salesclerk
- Family: Quartermaine; Spencer
- Parents: A. J. Quartermaine; Carly Corinthos
- Adoptive father: Sonny Corinthos
- Siblings: Dante Falconeri (adoptive); Kristina Davis (adoptive); Morgan Corinthos; Lila McCall (adoptive); Josslyn Jacks; Avery Corinthos (adoptive); Donna Corinthos
- Spouse: Nelle Benson (2018); Willow Tait (2020–2021, 2023–2025)
- Children: Wiley Cooper-Jones; Amelia Corinthos; Daisy Gilmore
- Grandfathers: Alan Quartermaine; John Durant; Mike Corbin (adoptive)
- Grandmothers: Monica Quartermaine; Bobbie Spencer; Virginia Benson (adoptive); Adela Corinthos (adoptive)
- Uncles: Jason Morgan; Drew Cain; Lucas Jones (adoptive); Ric Lansing (adoptive)
- Aunts: Skye Quartermaine (adoptive); Dawn Winthrop; Emily Quartermaine (adoptive); B. J. Jones (adoptive); Courtney Matthews (adoptive); Nelle Benson (adoptive)
- Nephews: Gio Palmieri (adoptive); Rocco Falconeri (adoptive)
- First cousins: Lila Rae Alcazar (adoptive); Jake Webber; Danny Morgan; Emily Cain; Molly Lansing (adoptive); Spencer Cassadine (adoptive); Oscar Nero
- Other relatives: Edward Quartermaine; Lila Quartermaine; Tracy Quartermaine; Luke Spencer; Lucky Spencer; Lulu Spencer; Ned Quartermaine; Dillon Quartermaine; Brook Lynn Quartermaine; Jimmy Lee Holt

Michael Corinthos is a fictional character on General Hospital, an American soap opera on the ABC network. Introduced in 1997, the role was portrayed by several child actors—most notably Dylan Cash when the character was rapidly aged in 2002. In 2009, the character was aged again when Drew Garrett stepped into the role. Garrett was replaced by Chad Duell after one year with the series. Robert Adamson pinch-hit for Duell in 2022 and 2024 when the actor was unavailable for various reasons. In November 2024, Duell announced his exit from the role and exited in January of the following year, when Michael is transferred to a hospital in Germany to receive an experimental treatment for third-degree burns. Rory Gibson assumed the role in May 2025, when Michael returned to Port Charles.

The son of A. J. Quartermaine and Carly Corinthos, and adoptive son of mob boss Sonny Corinthos, Michael is raised at the center of a bitter battle between the Quartermaine and Corinthos families. The character's most significant storylines include his accidental shooting of Kate Howard, his own shooting and waking from a coma, and being sent to prison for the murder of his stepmother Claudia Zacchara where he was raped. Most recently, the character has embraced his biological roots. Michael spent the majority of his life trying to emulate his adoptive father, but has since matured into a man in his own right.

== Casting and portrayals ==
Born on-screen on December 29, 1997, the role was originated by child actors Blake and Dylan Hopkins. The twin actors were replaced by Tiarnan Cunningham in 2001, who stayed with the series until 2002. On April 23, 2002, Dylan Cash made his first appearance as Michael, aging the character and revising his birth year to 1995. After three years with the series, Cash signed a contract in April 2005. In March 2008, rumors began circulating that Cash's contract was about to expire and would not be renewed, and by April several sources confirmed the fact. BuddyTV reported that Cash was blindsided by his firing, and confirmed the series was considering aging the character. It was also rumored ABC was considering As the World Turns actor Jesse Lee Soffer for the role. Cash made his last appearance as a contract cast member on May 16, 2008, briefly reprising the role for one episode on December 29, 2008.

You'd think growing up as the son of a mobster would mean violence wasn't a big deal, but a stray bullet (meant for his dad) sent Michael into a coma that changed his life, and his family, forever. After a year asleep - and a subsequent stint in prison - Michael is no longer the sweet little boy everyone remembers.

=== Drew Garrett ===
"For the sake of the storyline, and the summer shows going for the young audience… with all respect to Dylan Cash… there is only so much you can do with a 13-year-old actor, in reference to an interesting and volatile storyline. People want to see some stuff go down. And with a younger character, what’s it going to be, skipping class and not doing homework? They want some bar brawls! And for that reason, it will add a lot more interest and attract the younger audience for summer time."

— Garrett on the reason for the recast.

In March 2009, after months of speculation, it was confirmed by TV Guide that soap newcomer, Drew Garrett had been cast in the role and would make his debut on April 24, 2009. The casting of Garrett also confirmed the character's SORAS aging; Michael would now be seventeen, revising the character's birth year to 1991. Garrett revealed that he first auditioned for the role with Laura Wright, who portrayed Michael's mother, Carly. After about three weeks of waiting, Garrett finally was asked to return for a session with the producers. At this time, Garrett was still unaware of the role he was auditioning for, knowing it only to be "Michael," and a week later his agent told him his follow up screen test was cancelled and that he was the new Michael Corinthos. On March 22, 2010, several reports surfaced confirming that Drew Garrett had been let go from the series, and the role of Michael was to be recast. Garrett made his final appearance in the role of Michael on April 19, 2010.

Garrett's Michael is very rebellious, and edgy. He is all about exploring, "stirring up trouble and crossing boundaries." The bad behavior is Michael's way of reclaiming the life he's lost. He wants to live a full life, without limitations and believes embracing danger is the way to do it. Michael is in complete denial about how much has changed. Michael is not in any way thinking about his future. He is just worried about how he can get the most excitement out of the life he currently has. Michael refuses to take no for an answer which often gets him into trouble. According to Garrett, Michael does not believe he has any other options in life which is why he is determined to work for his father. Michael stubbornly refuses to accept that working for Sonny is not an option. Things are further complicated when Michael cannot control emotions. What makes matters worse is that Michael does not know why he gets so angry; the not knowing perpetuates the anger.

=== Chad Duell ===
"I see Michael as a disturbed individual. He has brain trauma, and if people saw what I, as Michael, almost did to Warren Bauer on last week’s episode, which was almost kill him, you know that. He snaps, but it builds up. Michael bottles it up. He tries not to show people his anger. If he were to show people his anger, maybe what happened to him in prison would be more revealed to everyone. I am trying to show the heart, soul, and sensitivity of Michael and the struggle that he is going through, more so than him being kind of an ‘in your face attacking’ kind of a person."

— Duell on what he brings to Michael.

Chad Duell made his first appearance in the role of Michael on April 20, 2010. In an interview with Crushable.com, Duell revealed that he auditioned around the same time as Garrett in 2009, but Garrett was awarded the role. The producers had begun developing a new role for Michael's sister, Kristina Davis (Lexi Ainsworth)'s, love interest, which Duell also auditioned for. His performance was so well received that at the expiration of Garrett's contract, Duell was cast as Michael, and the other character was scrapped. "They had a certain feel about how they wanted [Michael] and now, I guess they're going in this direction," Duell told Soap Opera Digest. In January 2012, a casting call for the character of Erik was released leading to speculation that Duell was about to be replaced as Michael. Duell later took to Twitter with a simple response to fans inquiry about him possibly being replaced, "I'm not."

Duell described his character as being very multi-layered, having a lot of baggage, but also a great heart. He says that Michael loves his family, and wants to make his father proud, which in Duell's eyes, is what makes the character so interesting; "He's very complex. He's got so many things going on at once... He's an awesome kid but he's had it very rough." According to Duell, Michael is a tough kid who angers easily, who is torn between being a good guy, but is afraid to feel weak. "I like showing more sides to him. I want (to show) his heart more than his anger. I don’t want him to be one way." According to Duell, Michael is "never just one way. There's always something behind everything." Duell's ability to bring complexity to Michael is what he believes led to the recast. Duell described Michael as being "a very strong kid.…He's strong for his father, above all. He has thick enough skin to get through a lot of things."

On November 23, 2024, Duell announced his exit from the role. In a statement, via his Instagram account, he explained: "After many incredible years with General Hospital, I've decided to step away from the show. This wasn't an easy decision for me, but it feels like the right time in my life. I'm beyond grateful to Frank Valentini, the cast, crew, and everyone behind the scenes who have been like family to me throughout this amazing journey." Valentini issued a statement on Twitter expressing his appreciation to Duell, while also noting there were no plans for recasting the role "at this time". He made his final appearance on January 21, 2025. That June, Duell held an Instagram Live on his social media, doubling down on his previous statement concerning his exit from the role. He stated: "I just needed a bit of a break. [...] For how long, we don't know."

=== Robert Adamson ===
In June 2022, it was announced Robert Adamson would pinch-hit for Duell, who was unavailable, due to undisclosed reasons. He appeared intermediately from June to July 2022. In August of the same year, it was announced Adamson would appear for two additional episodes, due to Duell's illness; Adamson's work aired September 2 and 6. On October 28, 2024, it was announced Adamson would pinch-hit for Duell for a third time, for one episode the following day, due to a scheduling conflict on Duell's behalf.

=== Rory Gibson ===
In May 2025, following increased speculation, Soaps.com announced Rory Gibson had been cast in the role. He made his episodic debut on May 23. Speaking on his casting, he remarked: "I've been a recast before, so I know that it can come with a little bit of resistance." His predecessor, Duell, expressed grace towards Gibson for his taking over the role.

== Development ==
=== Shootings and coma (2007–2008) ===
"I like it from an emotional standpoint. I also like it from a responsible standpoint. Twelve-year-olds shouldn't be picking up guns; I don't care if your father is a gangster. And if they do, there's got to be a consequence. We make directly culpable the people who love him most."

— Bob Guza on the consequences of Michael's actions.

From November 2007 to February 2008, then headwriter, Robert Guza temporarily vacated his post during the 2007-2008 Writers Guild of America strike and was temporarily replaced by Garin Wolf. It was during this time that the first gun violence storyline with Michael unfolded and Michael accidentally shoots Kate Howard (Megan Ward). Though his family uncovers his involvement in the shooting, Michael does not face any consequences. When Guza returned to his post as head writer, rumors circulated on Internet message boards that Michael would be the next casualty of a mob war. According to one poster, Michael would be left comatose in order to "spirit the character off the canvas and ignite the current true-loving Jason's bloodlust for the Zaccharas." It was originally speculated that the character would be killed off the show entirely. The storyline culminated on April 4, 2008, and the character ends up in a coma.

"It will play out for months. It's a major, major thing. And the ripple effect on the emotional lives of the characters is going to go on for maybe years… You're going to see relationships shatter, new relationships forged out of grief and a need to understand the un-understandable. That's the only way you can justify doing it."

— Bob Guza on the aftermath of Michael's shooting.

It was Guza's belief that the most appropriate way to address fan disapproval of the lack of consequences for Michael's recent actions was to have Michael take a bullet himself. According to Guza, the incident also forces—Sonny, Carly, Jason, and Jax—the adults in Michael's life to reevaluate their choices. Guza's dialogue for the Johnny Zacchara character expresses that all four are to blame, stating, "kill each other for power and money and turn around and lie and say that we have honor, that we protect family, that women and children are safe." However, Michael's shooting would not completely do away with the violence in the show. It instead serves as a catalyst forcing those around Michael to make life-altering decisions.

=== Return, rebellion, and murder (2009) ===
"I think it’s a culmination of things. First of all, I have been in a coma, so I am already disgruntled with that, and then the fact that she was not there when I woke up doesn’t make it any better. It’s one more thing on the plate that makes him worry about his life when he was in a coma. Did they care? Were they around? I don’t know if they were around. All I can sort of remember is Claudia’s voice, vaguely. Sonny took me under his wing and did his best to help me understand and figure out why I am what I am."

— Garrett on Michael's anger towards Carly.

With the announcement of Garrett's casting, many questioned how the character would return to the canvas. Michael finally wakes up on May 18, 2009, with cousin Lulu Spencer (Julie Marie Berman) at his bedside. The now 17-year-old Michael must battle significant health complications before becoming a "normal" teenager. After a risky surgery to keep Michael from slipping into a persistent vegetative state, Michael wakes up. Garrett explained that while Michael healed physically, his mental and emotional health would cause drama. Because Michael and his adoptive half-sister Kristina Davis (Lexi Ainsworth) have very little contact growing up, the writers considered developing a romance between the two. Garrett believed that if either of them were to develop feelings, it would be Kristina, as Michael is too preoccupied with his recovery. Michael is immediately angry with Carly for not being present when he opens his eyes, and believes she is trying to replace him by having another child. The storyline also allows for further development of Michael's relationship with Jason, who also suffered from a brain injury when he was a little older than Michael. Jason becomes Michael's confidant. The story also featured a guest appearance on the June 29, 2009 episode from then Arizona Diamondbacks Outfielder, Connor Jackson, as Michael's physical therapist.

In the meantime, Michael's new stepmother, Claudia Zacchara (Sarah Brown), begins fishing for information trying to figure out if Michael remembers her bedside confessions about her involvement in his shooting. During his recovery, Michael takes a liking to Claudia as his stepmother, according to Garrett "because she tells me what I want to hear," and though she starts out trying to manipulate him, Claudia actually comes to care for him, and Michael sees this. Michael even goes so far as to label Claudia as being "cool." This does not sit well with Jason who suspects Claudia of having something to do with the shooting that landed Michael in a coma. In the summer of 2009, as Claudia begins to grow paranoid, she gets into a car accident which leads to her suffering a miscarriage. Michael is believed to be responsible for the accident; to avoid facing what he believes he has done, Michael and Kristina run away to Mexico. Claudia then enlists sociopath, Jerry Jacks (Sebastian Roché) and orders him to track them down and kill them; instead Jerry uses the teens to lure Jason into a trap. Fortunately, Michael realizes that Jerry is holding them prisoner; Michael is very much like Sonny when it comes to recognizing a threat. Kristina doesn't want to believe Jerry is going to hurt them, but because the siblings were brought up differently, they see the situation differently. Michael and Kristina's attempt to live independently and start new lives in Mexico is cut short and they are forced back to Port Charles. However, the adventure leads to Michael's first kiss with a local girl, Marita.

By this time, Brown had started speaking out against the direction of her storyline, and her disapproving of Claudia intentionally trying to hurt Michael or Kristina. The complaints were followed by the announcement of Brown's departure in September 2009 with her onscreen exit slated for October. Most fans assumed that once the truth about Claudia's involvement in Michael's shooting was revealed, she would end up dead. An article from The Huffington Post called for just that. Due to Brown's exit coinciding with November Sweeps, it was expected that Brown's exit would have a major impact on the storyline. According to a spokesperson for the series, her exit would be "buzz-worthy."

Spoilers also began surfacing with reports that Claudia would be killed off. On the October 1, 2009 episode, Michael confronts Claudia about his memory of her confession; however, she is able to explain her way out of it. Despite the obvious, Michael defends Claudia to everyone that bad-mouths her. But, because Michael is not exactly sure if his memories are accurate, he hesitates to come forward. Michael goes so far as to warn Johnny that Jason and Sonny will soon learn the truth, telling Johnny that he may be the only person who can save Claudia. On October 30, 2009, Regan Cellura of Daytime Confidential posted a spoiler article confirming that Claudia was indeed going to die. On the night of Claudia's birthday party, Jason comes to Sonny with confirmation that Claudia hired the shooter that tried to kill him. Most fans had previously assumed that Sonny would be the one to "eliminate" Claudia, but in a shocking twist, it is Michael who finally kills Claudia. After Sonny outs Claudia at the party, she takes a laboring Carly hostage at gunpoint. The women end up at an abandoned cabin in the woods where a crazed Claudia, still grieving over her own miscarriage, plans to take Carly's newborn daughter Josslyn for herself. On the November 4, 2009 episode, as Claudia is about to run away with baby Josslyn, Michael comes upon Claudia's car and goes searching. He finds the cabin, and hearing his mother's screams, Michael grabs the first thing he sees — an axe handle — and swings it, bludgeoning Claudia to death.

=== Cover up and prison (2009–2010) ===
After the murder, Michael makes a "startling" change in behavior by not showing any emotional reaction, believing Claudia deserved what she got, and justifying his actions to save his mother and sister. However, Michael only feels guilty because he did not come forward about his flashbacks sooner and knows he could have prevented the situation. When it comes to Claudia, "Michael is in a very dark place," said Garrett to Soap Opera Digest. The reckless behavior is Michael's attempt to live up to the Corinthos reputation, even going so far as to sic Sonny's goons on Kristina's jerk boyfriend, Kiefer Bauer (Christian Alexander). Despite Sonny's disapproval, Michael is more than determined to join Sonny's organization. Michael feels invincible believing he got away with what he did because of who his father is. Most of Michael's decisions are a source of conflict for his parents. Michael constantly insinuates himself into Sonny's business, despite Carly and Jason's disapproval. Sonny disapproves too, but believes keeping Michael close will protect him. Weeks prior to his 18th birthday, Michael warns his parental figures that he will start making decisions for himself. From the moment Michael realizes that Sonny might be convicted, Michael returns home with the evidence (his bloody shirt) in hand. However, Dante does not believe Michael's claims of guilt until after a forensics exam confirms them. According to Duell, Michael is in turmoil because no one wants him to confess. Dante tells Michael that if he comes forward, the judge will give him a lighter sentence. Duell stated: "[Dante] thinks I need to get it off my chest. Of course he wants Sonny in prison, but he doesn't want me to hold this burden on myself. He wants me to get it out of my system." Dante relays Michael's story to the entire courtroom moments before the verdict for Sonny is delivered. When asked about Michael's future following the murder confession, Duell said, "A different life. He's going to go through a big change. He's going to have a much different lifestyle."

Michael is sentenced to 5 years in prison, with the possibility of parole in 2 years which is a minimum sentence for taking a life. He was forced to go in alone. Some of the prisoners give him trouble because he is Sonny's son, but one man named Carter (Josh Wingate) protects him. However, on May 21, Carter warns Michael and decides that he must repay him for protecting him. Michael fights him off, but Carter returns that night and tells Michael to "pay up" as he corners him. In the next episode, Jason discovers a nearly catatonic Michael and realizes something is wrong. Jason tries to help him cope without actually acknowledging what he believes happened. Michael is in denial when Jason finally questions him about the incident and he blames himself for "everything," by rehashing Claudia's murder. Hints are dropped, but Michael never confirms anything. Joe Diliberto of Soap Opera Digest acknowledged that the storyline, which started out pretty straightforward, started to become very vague. Duell admitted that "As the actor playing him, I play it a certain way; how I feel [events] played out, so it's still a mystery." Before any confirmation, Guza said the "focus right now is on the horrific experience of an 18- or 19-year-old who is thrown into a terrible situation like this." He didn't want to make the story so specific so soon, but said the story could go in that direction. Michael has to deal at some point, but because of who Michael is, and who his father is, it is expected that he would get unwanted attention and attacks. Guza also revealed that Michael would get out of prison relatively quickly, but whatever happened to him would "fester." It is later revealed that Jason's rival, the crazed artist Franco (James Franco) sent Carter after Michael in prison. Though by this time, nothing has been confirmed, Jason believes Michael was raped.

"The writers let me have the leeway as an actor to show what I feel happened to Michael, so I am playing it a certain way. I have an idea of what happened, but it's best for the show right now to keep people guessing; keep that element of mystery. It will be revealed at a point — probably later in the year — what actually did happen, but right now, Michael is the only one who knows."

— Duell on his portrayal of Michael during the storyline.

In an interview with On-Air On-Soaps, Duell said the writers allowed him to play with the scenes (Michael in the cell after the confrontation with Carter) as he felt they played out, and would make a decision based on his portrayal. However, precaution is taken and Michael gets tested for HIV in addition to getting treated for his bruises. It is obvious Michael has been involved in a physical altercation of some sort, but the writers continue dancing around the subject. Chad Duell explained that it was difficult not to reveal too much during interviews and said that Michael would do the same; "He would not want to reveal too much." Duell explained that if Michael was raped, it would be hard for him to just come out and say it. It would be equally hard for everyone in his life to find out about the situation, and it would be really difficult for Michael to come to terms with it. Duell believed that if Michael had been raped, he would be a lot more distant and shut himself off.

Despite there being no actual confirmation at the time of the storyline, fans and critics made the assumption that Michael had been sexually assaulted. XFINITY's Sara Bibel highlighted the soap's pattern of putting their teenage characters in peril. According to Bibel, "What was a vague allusion of something that could happen… became an overt possibility" within a week of Michael's stint in prison. In response to Michael's reactions when being touched, Bibel concluded, "In real life, getting punched in the face by a convict who claims to be offering protection would be traumatic enough to elicit [that] reaction from an 18-year-old who is new to prison life. But this is a soap. Anyone who flinches when being touched, has in all probability been sexually assaulted." When Michael finally does get released from prison, he is on probation, and he cannot really enjoy his freedom because Jason, who got himself arrested to protect Michael, is still in jail. However, what makes matters worse for Michael is that he cannot have contact with Sonny; Michael is left without either father figure that raised him, so he feels alone and isolated. To top it all off, Michael has to live with Dante.

=== Romance with Abby and rape (2010–2011) ===
In July 2010, Duell announced that the show was developing a love interest for Michael and actresses would soon begin auditioning for the role. He explained that there would always be drama in any relationship Michael had with a girl because of what happened to him; "it will be difficult for him to be physical with a girl, or even be affectionate with a woman," Duell stated. Like any other aspect of Michael's life, intimacy of any kind becomes a struggle. Michael is forced to confront his intimacy issues when Kristina's friend Ali (Maitland McConnell) takes an interest in him. When Ali invites him to a party, he goes to his aunt, Sam McCall (Kelly Monaco) and confides in her that he is insecure about possibly getting intimate with Ali because he does not have any sexual experience. Sam enlists her stripper friend, Candy (Andrea Bogart) to help Michael deal with his intimacy issues. When the two are about to have sex for the first time in October 2010, Michael gets cold feet and gets a little aggressive with Candy when he believes things are moving too fast. Candy backs off and advises Michael that getting to know Ali would be his best option. In the meantime, Michael takes a liking to Candy and wants to get to know her. He learns that her real name is actually Abigail "Abby" Haver and that she only got into stripping so she could pay for her schooling. According to Duell, Michael finds it easy to talk to Abby because she doesn't know him; they can start with a clean slate. During an interview with Soap Opera Weekly, Duell revealed "She doesn't know about his baggage; what's happened to him in the past. She knows nothing about his family." Michael and Abby are able to start off fresh and build their relationship based on them getting to know one another. Michael does not have anyone his age who gives him that sense of "anonymity," because all of his classmates are aware of his past struggles. A friendship with someone as mature as Abby is just the kind of relationship Michael needs to help him deal with his own issues. Despite Michael really enjoying Abby's company, it would take a while before she gets him to open up and talk about what happened to him in prison. Duell admitted that Michael might never want to acknowledge what happened to him prison, unless he reaches his "breaking point."

"I remember the day we sat down and I was pitching this idea to [ABC Daytime chief] Brian Frons, and we were all going, "We love Michael! Why would we do this to him?" But that was the very reason to do it — because it's real, because it would happen to a character like him under those circumstances. It's almost a fantasy to think it wouldn't! Uproar from the audience was to be expected, but the only honest way for us to tell the story is to really deal with the reality of prison life. We're doing all the proper research and handling the aftermath as responsibly as possible."

— [Bob] Guza on Michael's rape

Michael finally reaches that point in January 2011 when he comes clean about his experience in prison. Viewers had suspected for months that Michael was raped and on January 31, 2011, Michael confirms those suspicions. Michael must relive the horrific experience of his rape at the hands of Carter when he witnesses Abby's ex-boyfriend, Brandon Lowell (Ross Thomas)'s attempted rape on her. Though the scenes are not very revealing, then head-writer, Bob Guza, wanted to make sure viewers noticed the visual and physical similarities between the attempted rape on Abby, and Michael's actual rape in prison. Michael's saving of Abby before she is actually raped serves as a kind of "catharsis" for him, allowing him to finally admit his experience in prison. "We needed a catalyst," Guza said during an interview with TV Guide and Abby filled that role.

Each reaction to Michael's confession is very different; With Sonny, "Michael somehow feels like he's let his father down," but in his own way, Sonny also has the "right" reaction to Michael's confession. Carly's reaction is also very out of character, instead of allowing her anger to get the best of her, she embraces Michael. She even convinces him to go to counseling. However, when it comes to the confession, it appears that Jason is the most affected by it. "Jason has always been Michael's mentor," Guza explained, but it is Jason's lifestyle that is directly responsible for Michael landing in prison, and by extension, the rape. The "guilt-stricken" Jason makes sure to remind Michael that "he's a survivor, not a victim." Once Michael has faced his past, he is able to open up to Abby and they make love for the first time on March 28, 2011.

Even with his new sense of freedom, and his new love, Michael is still determined to break into the mob. Upon his release, Michael "swore to himself he would never let anyone make him feel small and helpless as Carter (Josh Wingate) did to him and there's a part of him that wants to have the power now after feeling completely powerless," Duell revealed. Michael feels as if something was stolen from him in prison, so he wants to use the mob to fill that void. Despite understanding Michael's reasons for wanting to be in the mob, Duell described the obsession as "silly," because Michael is willing to throw his life away, despite all the support and opportunities he has. Fortunately, Abby is able to distract him from those desires and convinces him to work at ELQ with her instead.

However, Michael and Abby's age difference becomes a big problem for his mother, and his little sister, Kristina. Duell said that Michael and Abby have "common ground with each other. Michael went through something really awful and she has been through abusive stuff." In addition, Michael and Abby do indeed love one another. Michael Fairman worried that because of Duell's performances whenever Michael is faced with tough situations, Michael would eventually lose Abby. Duell responded saying he'd have no problem playing a scenario in which Michael loses Abby, if it made sense, and was well written; however, he was content with and enjoyed building Michael's relationship with Abby. Fairman's words may have been prophetic because Andrea Bogart officially departed from the series several months later on December 13, 2011, when Abby is killed in a construction accident, leaving Michael devastated. Bogart stated that she hoped that Michael would eventually find some happiness because he had been through so much.

=== Romance with Starr and A.J.'s return (2012–2013) ===
Upon Alderson's introduction as Starr, viewers and critics immediately began speculating that the two would be paired together. Duell said that he really enjoyed working with Alderson and said that he was ready for Michael to find some happiness. Michael and Starr's relationship starts off complicated because Sonny is believed to behind the deaths of her family. However, they immediately relate to one another because they are both grieving the loss of people they love. According to when Starr and Michael first start to bond, it is like one big "therapy session." Michael has to get Starr to trust him which is complicated by the fact that he could not save her family, and his father is the prime suspect in her family's murders. Michael defending Sonny causes a lot of trouble for the duo. Duell revealed that even if Michael and Starr were to become romantic, it would take quite some time as both of them needed to heal first. Even when Starr begins lashing out at Sonny, Michael understands that she has to blame someone. Talking with Starr starts the healing process for Michael. The two become friends rather quickly despite their father's being at odds. However, Duell revealed that a romance was possible once they could get past what has happened. But Duell hoped that it would not be rushed. According to Duell, helping Starr, could eventually help Michael come to terms with his own loss. And by the summer of 2012, Michael and Starr have admitted their feelings for one another and began dating. However, their new friendship and budding romance is threatened with re-introduction of Michael's sister, Kristina (Lindsey Morgan) and the arrival of her reality show producer, Trey Mitchell (Erik Valdez). Trey seems to annoy Starr a lot, which causes Michael to become a bit more protective of her. However, when Starr and Trey begin to commiserate over their fathers, Starr feels as if Michael is overreacting. Nothing ever comes of Trey's advances, as Michael and Starr grow closer as she supports him through the return of his biological father, and the death of his uncle.

The re-introduction of Michael's biological father, A.J. (Sean Kanan) completely turns his life upside down. Michael grows up believing the bitter battle was started by A.J. However, when A.J. tells him otherwise, Michael initially refuses to believe A.J.'s claims of being drugged in an alley by Carly, or left hanging on a meat hook by Sonny until he confronts his mother and she confirms A.J.'s stories. Michael is completely blindsided and disgusted by his mother's past actions. He never expected any of what A.J. told him to be true. Though he does not condone A.J.'s own actions – like kidnapping Michael and faking his death – Michael reminds Carly that A.J. only tried to defend himself in the war she started. Michael has mixed emotions; he does not know what to feel. Michael has so many questions running through his head, and majority of them begin with "What if?" Michael is completely torn on what to do. Is A.J. capable of change or telling the truth; would giving A.J. a chance hurt his relationships with Carly and Sonny.

== Storylines ==
=== 1997–2008 ===
Michael (Dylan Cash) as he appeared in 2008

When Carly (Sarah Brown) becomes pregnant, she names Jason (Steve Burton) as the father, believing A.J. (Billy Warlock) to be unfit. Upon birth, Michael is taken in by Jason and his girlfriend Robin Scorpio (Kimberly McCullough) as Carly is suffering from postpartum depression. Jason must make the decision to get Michael surgery when the child is diagnosed with a severe heart condition. In February 1998, Michael is christened with Emily Quartermaine (Amber Tamblyn) and Mike Corbin (Ron Hale) as his godparents. Carly's ex-fiancé, Tony Jones (Brad Maule), upset that he is not Michael's father, kidnaps the boy. Robin tells A.J. that Michael is his son, and Carly attempts a marriage with A.J. Afterwards she marries Sonny, who threatens A.J. until he gives up his paternal rights. Upon Sonny and Carly (Maurice Benard and Tamara Braun)'s first divorce in 2001, Sonny legally adopts Michael. In 2002 and 2003, respectively, Michael (Dylan Cash) gets a half-sister, Kristina Davis, and a brother, Morgan Corinthos. In February 2005, A.J. and Faith Rosco (Cynthia Preston) kidnap Michael, Morgan and Kristina. A.J. fakes Michael's death and attempts to turn him against his parents. Jason and Sam McCall (Kelly Monaco) manage to save him. Michael witnesses A.J.'s supposed murder in 2005, and is initially believed to have killed him. Michael makes several attempts to reunite his parents, but eventually forms a bond with his stepfather Jasper Jacks (Ingo Rademacher). When a serial killer begins terrorizing Port Charles, claiming the lives of Emily and his nanny Leticia (Jessi Morales), and almost his mother, Michael takes it upon himself to protect his family by purchasing a gun. After accidentally shooting his father's girlfriend Kate Howard (Megan Ward), Michael runs away from home. When he and Carly (Laura Wright) are reunited in a local warehouse, they are nearly killed in an explosion. Michael is rendered comatose in April 2008 after being shot in the head when a sniper tries to kill Sonny. Carly, Sonny, and Jason all hope for Michael to wake up and come back to them.

=== 2009–2011 ===
After the risky surgery, Michael wakes up exhibiting uncontrollable fits of rage. Carly; who is dealing with a high-risk pregnancy, agrees to send Michael to live with the Quartermaines. Believing his family will be better off, Michael and Kristina (Lexi Ainsworth) skip town when he mistakenly believes that he caused an accident that led to his stepmother, Claudia (Sarah Brown)'s miscarriage. The teens soon return, and Michael suddenly begins uncovering memories from the coma. He eventually remembers that Claudia was the one responsible for his shooting. He goes to tell Sonny, only to find him confronting Claudia for the shooting. Claudia takes Carly hostage, and escapes. Michael is on his way out of town when he discovers Claudia's car abandoned on the side of the road. Trying to stop Claudia from stealing his new-born sister, Josslyn Jacks, Michael kills her and is forced to keep quiet. When Sonny is arrested for Claudia's murder, Michael's attempt to confess goes unnoticed, and he is soon sent to Sonny's island. However, Sonny's new-found son, Dante Falconeri (Dominic Zamprogna) finds Michael and brings him back, where he confesses under oath to Claudia's murder. Michael is sent to prison, but Jason later pleads guilty to a felony with the condition that he receive the same sentence and will share a cell with Michael in order to protect him. Unfortunately, by the time Jason gets there, Michael has been attacked by Carter, another inmate. Jason kills Carter to protect Michael. After this, Dante manages to work out a deal, getting Michael released on parole. Wanting to get "experience," Michael tries to hook up with stripper Abby Haver (Andrea Bogart) he backs out, but he and Abby become friends, and eventually start dating. After saving Abby from an abusive ex-boyfriend, Michael finally admits to his family that he was raped by Carter in prison. With Abby and his family's help, Michael goes to therapy, and is able to recover, graduating from high school. Michael and Abby both start working at ELQ When a stalker starts beating up Abby's friends, Michael sends her out of town to keep her safe. Abby has an unfortunate accident, and ends up dying, leaving Michael devastated.

=== 2012–2014 ===
Michael befriends a grieving Starr Manning (Kristen Alderson) after his failed attempt to save her daughter and boyfriend, and they soon start dating. Meanwhile, Michael clashes with Kristina's reality show producer Trey Mitchell (Erik Valdez) because of his friendship with Starr. As the family mourns the deaths of Jason and Michael's great-grandfather Edward Quartermaine (John Ingle), Michael becomes the center of yet another battle between Sonny, Carly and a very much alive A.J. (Sean Kanan). Michael bonds with A.J., hoping to build a relationship with him. Together, Michael and A.J. remove Tracy Quartermaine (Jane Elliot) as CEO of ELQ, allowing A.J. to take her place. Starr suddenly leaves town and dumps Michael over the phone. Michael gets drunk and wakes up in bed with Sonny's ex-wife Brenda Barrett (Vanessa Marcil), believing they have slept together; it's later revealed that they didn't.

Michael welcomes Morgan (Bryan Craig) and his scheming girlfriend Kiki Jerome (also played by Alderson) into his home. Michael and Kiki initially clash, but soon fall for each other and kiss. They are soon led to believe they are cousins when Kiki is revealed to be Franco's (Roger Howarth) long lost daughter. By the time their connection is proven false, Morgan and Kiki have eloped. When Kate (Kelly Sullivan) is murdered, A.J. is the prime suspect, and Michael defends his innocence. At Morgan and Kiki's reception, a grieving Sonny reveals that Morgan knew Kiki and Michael weren't related, and he married her so Kiki would not leave him for Michael. A furious Morgan blames his family for favoring Michael. Michael and Kiki start dating when she dumps Morgan.

Michael is devastated when a drunken A.J. is murdered trying to clear his name and Carlos Rivera (Jeffrey Vincent Parise) is convicted of the crime. Michael later learns that his great uncle Luke Spencer (Anthony Geary) has been hitting on Kiki, even though he is engaged to Tracy. Tracy's son Ned Ashton (Wally Kurth) suspects that Luke is after the company, and together, he and Michael fire Tracy from ELQ and Michael replaces her as CEO. Michael hires Morgan and Kiki to oversee ELQ's renovations of The Brownstone in exchange for free room and board. Meanwhile, Michael and Tracy reconcile and he welcomes her back to the company.

Michael discovers that Rivera is not A.J.'s killer and starts digging for answers. As Carly is set to marry Franco, Michael learns that Sonny killed A.J., and Carly helped him cover it up. Michael holds Sonny at gunpoint, ready to kill him, but his brothers talk him down. Michael disowns Kiki and Morgan upon discovering that they knew about Sonny's involvement in A.J.'s murder. He gets drunk and has a one-night stand with Rosalie Martinez (Linda Elena Tovar). Kiki discovers them in bed together, and Michael dumps her on the spot.

=== 2015–present ===
Sonny is sent to prison for A.J.'s murder, and Michael decides to change his last name to Quartermaine, distancing himself from Carly and Morgan. Sonny breaks out of jail when Luke threatens Michael, and saves Michael and several others from being killed by a bomb Luke planted. When the governor grants Sonny a pardon for saving his daughter from the bomb, releasing him from prison, Michael is furious, and, as revenge, sues for custody of Sonny's newborn daughter Avery. Michael brings up Sonny's past and his own shooting, depicting Sonny as an unfit parent, and wins custody of Avery. Michael hires "Jake Doe" (Billy Miller) and Rosalie as employees at ELQ, and hires Sabrina Santiago (Teresa Castillo) as a nanny for Avery. However, Michael finds out that Rosalie is helping Nikolas Cassadine (Tyler Christopher) take over ELQ by stealing stocks. Nikolas gains a majority hold in ELQ, and ousts Michael as CEO. Michael, meanwhile, starts a relationship with Sabrina. She convinces him to try to reconcile with his parents, and Michael gives Avery back to Sonny.

Sabrina finds out she is pregnant, and Michael is excited to be a father. However, Michael later finds out that Carlos is the baby's father, and is upset with Sabrina for lying to him. She leaves town before Michael has a chance to make amends with her. He later gets a note from Sabrina saying she's not coming back. Michael discovers that "Jake" is actually Jason, alive with a new face. Hoping to get ELQ back, he and Tracy sue Nikolas with Jason's help. However, Jason manages to buy out the ELQ stocks from Nikolas. He gives Michael back his position as CEO, and ELQ back to the Quartermaines. Carlos is arrested and brought back to Port Charles, and Michael asks him where Sabrina is. Carlos refuses to give up Sabrina's location, and escapes from police custody. Michael finds Carlos after he is stabbed by Julian Jerome (William deVry), and brings Carlos to GH. Carlos dies before he can reveal where Sabrina is. Michael enlists Sonny's help to find Sabrina. When Sabrina's son shows up at the Quartermaine mansion, Michael realizes Sabrina is in trouble. He and Sonny go to Puerto Rico and rescue Sabrina from her captor. He reunites her with her son, and the two mend their relationship.

Michael's new-found happiness with Sabrina and her son, Teddy Rivera is shattered when Sabrina is murdered. Michael gives Teddy to Joe Rivera (Jeffrey Vincent Parise) Carlos' brother; who takes his nephew back to Puerto Rico. Unfortunately, Michael is dealt another devastating blow soon after when Morgan is killed in a car bombing meant for Julian. Sonny is suspected by many, including Michael; until Jason finds evidence that proves him innocent. Meanwhile, Michael starts to grow close with Nelle Benson (Chloe Lanier) the kidney donor; who saved Michael's sister, Josslyn. The union between Michael and Nelle resulted in the birth of their son, Wiley Cooper-Jones later renamed Wiley Alan Corinthos.

Michael later begins a relationship with Willow Tait (Katelyn MacMullen), and the two later fall in love and get married at the Quartermaine Mansion and have a child, a daughter named Amelia Corinthos. In January 2025, Michael is transferred to a hospital in Germany after receiving third-degree burns; he (Gibson) returns to Port Charles four months later.

== Reception ==
=== General ===
In 2003, Cash won the Young Artist Award for Best Performance in TV Series for his portrayal of Michael. In response to Michael's fits of rage after the coma, Michael Fairman wondered, "Did something go wrong with Patrick’s miracle surgery or is it just a case of scrambled brain cells that will eventually heal and allow the real Michael to emerge?" Fairman goes on to describe Garrett as being very impressive, from the start and proving why he was the man to play "one of the most important and sought after roles in daytime." Fairman raves about Garrett's performance saying he took viewers on an emotional journey. Fairman also discussed the irony of Jason becoming the only person Michael can really depend on, considering Jason raising Michael for the first year of his life. Mallory Harlen said Garrett's Michael was extremely compelling and said Garrett "skillfully navigates the character's drastic mood swings."

Despite his controversial firing, Garrett received a Daytime Emmy nomination in the Outstanding Younger Actor category for his portrayal of Michael following Claudia's murder. Carolyn Hinsey said it was ironic that Drew Garrett was nominated after he was fired. When Duell's Michael is sent to prison, Carly threatens to do anything to get him out and Michael replies, "No prison breaks, okay? Your plans always make me nervous." Soap Opera Digest listed their exchange as one of the show's funniest lines. Chad Duell ranked at #5 on Daytime Confidential's list of the "Top 10 Soap Newcomers of 2010." The list described Duell's first few weeks as "shaky" but applauded him for settling into the role. The article also noted Duell's expert portrayal of Michael during the prison storyline stating that the actor "managed to expertly convey the sorrow, anger, confusion and angst of a privileged young man who had to pay for the lifestyle his parents raised him up in." Nelson Branco of TV Guide also listed Duell on his list of "2010's Hottest Newcomers." Also in 2011, Duell won TV Guide's Soap Opera Spirit award for Outstanding Male Actor in a New Role or Recast. Michael Logan of TV Guide acknowledged that Duell's overall portrayal of Michael throughout 2010 was very good, but his submission for the Emmy was not his absolute best. Duell was listed as the Performer of the Week in the January 17, 2012 issue of Soap Opera Digest and applauded Duell for his portrayal of Michael grieving for Abby. The scene in which Michael says goodbye to Abby comes off "signaling that whatever innocence Michael had left died alongside Abby."

In April 2015, Duell won the Daytime Emmy Award for Outstanding Supporting Actor in a Drama Series. While it was Duell's fourth nomination, it was his first in the supporting actor category and his first win overall.

In 2023, Charlie Mason from Soaps She Knows placed Michael at #36 on his ranked list of General Hospital’s 40+ Greatest Characters of All Time, commenting "Despite having one dad who’s a career criminal (hey there, Sonny Corinthos) and another who never met a plot that he wouldn’t hatch (R.I.P, A.J. Quartermaine), Carly’s son is the straightest of arrows. Unless, that is, he’s out for revenge; in that case, all bets are off."

=== Michael's shooting ===
"We've been accused before of glorifying violence. But we always try to show the consequences… 12-year-olds shouldn't be picking up guns. And if they do, there's got to be a consequence…"

— Bob Guza in response to accusations of glorifying violence.

Fans and critics alike criticized the rumored storyline. Jamey Giddens, of Daytime Confidential wondered what Cash's exit would mean for the "already fractured [Quartermaine] dynasty." Daytime Confidential's Tina disapproved of the story due to Michael's involvement in Kate's shooting in February of that same year. Another member of Daytime Confidential, Luke Kerr also spoke out against the storyline due to Michael being one of the only surviving members of the famed Quartermaine family, despite being raised as a member of the Corinthos family. However, Kerr expressed his hope that the character would be aged and also recommended As the World Turn's Jesse Lee Soffer (Will Munson) for the role. Viewers are shocked and dismayed on April 4, 2008, when the 12-year-old Michael gets shot in the head, and falls into a coma. While some viewed the shooting of a child as a "risky move," others saw the plot as an opportunity for the character to be aged.

=== Recast ===
"It was like somebody took my brain out of my head and threw it in a dryer on high."

— Garrett on his firing.

Drew Garrett's sudden ousting was characterized by most critics as "shocking." Soaps In Depth confirmed the report on Twitter. The show was criticized for recasting the role at the height of a very critical storyline in the character's history. Garrett's costar Steve Burton responded to the news on Twitter saying, "Sucks!Sucks!Sucks!" Allison Waldmen of The Huffington Post stated, "It's hard to fathom why 'GH' has made this switch," explaining that Garrett was very good in his portrayal of Michael, and that he fit nicely with his costars.

On the day of the announcement, "Keep Drew Garrett" became a trending topic on Twitter. Along with fan outrage, the news sparked a Facebook campaign with constant comments from Garrett's fans. Founder of the campaign, LeAnn Skeen responded to criticism about her efforts with, "It's not silly. Fans get really upset about TV shows. And the executive producers really need to respect what the viewers want." Garrett responded to the firing with the following statement: "Whether I stayed on the show one year or four years or two years, it was a great experience regardless and a great tool for my career." Garrett's mother, Karole Cooney, admitted that she had never watched soaps before, but started watching because of her son, and had actually come to enjoy General Hospital apart from her son's portrayal. With the news of his firing, Cooney admitted that she was very conflicted about continuing to watch the series. Fans also reacted by creating a YouTube video montage of Garrett's time on GH titled, "Keep Drew Garrett." Garrett's costar, Maurice Benard voice his displeasure about Garrett's firing in an issue of Soaps In Depth but acknowledged that he would have no problem continuing with the story, and remarked that, "Sometimes, you have to put personal feelings aside." Duell later revealed in an interview that due to Benard still being upset about Garrett's firing, he put some distance between them. Later, Benard and Duell found some common ground and have since developed a friendship. Garrett later told Soaps In Depth that the reaction to his ousting gave him some closure and said it "was a really great run." Though he maintained contact with some costars, he does not watch the show. Duell said he expected to land a soap gig because he had auditioned for others but he was a bit shocked by the decision to recast.

Though Michael can be seen as an infuriating teenager, Becca Thomas described Garrett's performance as "stellar" said that she actually rooted for Michael despite all the terrible decisions he made. "Garrett was a fantastic Michael" said Thomas. The younger characters had become very well rounded, and Garrett's ousting leaves viewers unsure about the direction. Soap Opera Digest described Morgan being recast so soon after Michael as "March Madness." Laura Wright said though Duell's portrayal of Michael is "100% different" but still good. Though she was close to Drew Garrett, she could not take it out on Chad because the decision was beyond his control. The news of Garrett's departure was one of the genre's biggest headlines during the year of 2010. In a review, Becca Thomas and Mallory Harlen said they were disappointed in Garrett's ousting considering his portrayal was one of the big reasons for them to watch. However, the article applauded Duell who proved that "lightning does strike twice." Duell was categorized as the Best Newcomer of the year. Thomas and Harlen praised Duell's performance during Michael's prison stint and possible rape.

=== Rape storyline ===
"His portrayal of the inner turmoil Michael endured for months was true to form. Chad has the innate ability to show viewers what he's feeling with just a simple look. Since joining GH, Chad has played every emotion with such conviction and dedication that he has made us feel what Michael feels in the process. When Michael revealed to Jason the secret that's been tearing at his soul for months, it was one of those moments where you became immersed in the scene."

— Chrissie Ortiz on Duell's performance.

Though the potential storyline garnered the attention of many, some questioned if the show went too far in the storyline. Due to the rarity of television shows dealing with the reality of prison rape, critics wondered if the story was being used progressively or just to garner ratings. A majority of fans believed that the story was much too dark. During an interview with then scriptwriter, Karen Harris, Lori Wilson of Soaps She Knows applauded Duell for his "fantastic" work. Harris herself acknowledged that it was very risky, but "brilliant" to put Sonny's son in that position and applauded [Bob] Guza for his bravery in going in that direction. Daniel Villarreal of the online magazine Queerty commented, "Showing [the rape's] effects on the young man makes for a more heartrending tale than if they’d just shown the attack." Other soap operas, All My Children, The Young and the Restless, and One Life to Live all featured storylines alluding to prison rape in the 1980s, but GH is the first of the genre to actually address the reality in full.

TV Guide's Michael Logan compares the storyline to HBO television series Oz, believing that the show would show the full experience. Logan also noted that the storyline became very vague, as if the writers were struggling with whether to continue with the plot because of fan outrage when it was only implied that Michael may have been raped. Chrissie Ortiz of TVSource noted that Michael's confession scenes "struck an emotional chord" allowing for the actors to deliver "heart-wrenching" performances. Ortiz labeled Duell's performance as "brilliant" and applauded scriptwriters, Karen Harris and Michele Val Jean for their "amazing writing". Michael Fairman awarded Duell, as well as his costars with the Power Performance of the Week in February 2011 for Michael's confession scenes. Fairman called Duell's performance "riveting." Ortiz said that Duell's performance during Michael's confession made up for the shocking recast because he was able to take a very complex role and make it his own. Duell's performance pulled you into the scene and Ortiz described it as being "full of such raw emotion." However, Ortiz criticized the promo for the following week in which the narrators asked the question, "Can Sonny help his son heal?" Ortiz disapproved of the story becoming about other characters; Ortiz then stated the question should've been, "How will Michael heal?" Duell was listed as the Performer of the Week for in the March 8, 2011 issue of Soaps Opera Digest for the scenes in which Michael confesses to being raped. Soap Opera Digest said, "And with his heartfelt, poignant, portrayal, Duell has finally and firmly made this role his own." In 2024, as part of their year-end review, Soap Opera News editor Michael Thomas listed Duell's exit as Michael as their third most-shocking soap opera exit of the year.
