= Jennifer Bransford =

American film and television actress

- Born: December 2, 1968 (age 57); Washington, D.C., U.S.
- Occupations: Film and television actress

Jennifer Bransford (born December 2, 1968) is an American film and television actress. She is best known for playing Carly Corinthos in the American soap opera television series General Hospital.

== Life and career ==
Bransford was born in Washington, D.C. She began her screen career in 1992, playing Pamela in the NBC soap opera television series Another World. From 1997 to 1998, she played Nora's legal assistant Georgie Phillips in the ABC soap opera television series One Life to Live.

Later in her career, Bransford guest-starred in television programs including Law & Order, Jonny Zero and Vengeance Unlimited. In addition to her guest-appearances, she played Carly Corinthos in the ABC soap opera television series General Hospital in 2005. She also appeared in films such as Witchcraft 666: The Devil's Mistress and Amy's Orgasm.

Preceded by Tamara Braun	Carly Corinthos (role); 20054	Succeeded by Laura Wright
