= Aaron Sanders =

American actor (born 1996)

- Born: April 16, 1996 (age 29); Templeton, California
- Occupation: Actor
- Years active: 2005–present
- Height: 5 ft 4 in (1.63 m)

Aaron Sanders (born April 16, 1996) is an American actor, known for his roles as Morgan Corinthos in the soap-opera General Hospital and as Ethan in the movie No Greater Love. He has a younger brother, Cameron, who is also an actor. He now resides in Templeton, Ca.

== Filmography ==
Year	Title	Role	Notes
2005	Genetically Challenged	Young Zach	TV movie
2008	Deserted	Nathan	Short
2009	A Single Man	Tom Strunk	
2010	No Greater Love	Ethan Baker	
2013	How to Make it to the Promised Land	David	Short

== Television ==
Year	Title	Role	Episode
2006	Crumbs	Jody - Age 8	"Jody Crumb, Superstar"
2007	CSI: Miami	Young Lucas Wade	"Born to Kill"
2010	Modern Family	Jeremy	"The Kiss"
2010	Private Practice	Zack Harris	"Short Cuts"
2010–11	General Hospital	Morgan Corinthos	37 episodes
2011	Childrens Hospital	Randall	"Ward 8"
2017	Law & Order: Special Victims Unit	Luke Keller	"Motherly Love"
2018–2019	Silicon Valley	Holden	6 episodes
