= Julian Stone =

British actor

Julian Stone is a British actor.

He has appeared extensively on the screen, guest-starring in many popular TV shows including Suburgatory, Maron, Castle, Columbo, Mad About You, Baywatch, and Babylon 5, and was a regular on General Hospital as Jerry Jacks (ABC). As a voice actor, he has worked in video game franchises such as Call of Duty, Medal of Honor, Titanfall and Uncharted, and films including Star Wars: The Last Jedi, Rogue One, Guardians of the Galaxy Vol. 2, The Revenant, Mad Max: Fury Road, and Phantom Thread.

Stone played Jerry Jacks on the soap opera General Hospital from April 1998 until December 1999. Stone also portrayed vampire Barnabas Collins in a 1988 Off-Broadway play of Dark Shadows.

He also played Derek Hammond in the 2002 Dualstar movie When in Rome.

In October 2003, Stone took over for Justin Carroll as David Hastings on Passions while Carroll was on paternity leave.

== Television filmography ==
- Call of Duty: Modern Warfare (2019) as UK Team Leader
- Maron as Wesley Mann (2013) - (episode Sex Fest)
- Lois and Clark: The New Adventures of Superman as Patrick Sullivan (1995) – (Season 3 Episode 4 "When Irish Eyes Are Killing")
- Poltergeist: The Legacy as Samuel Hartford (1996) (one episode guest star – Man in the Mist)
- Renegade as Gary Butler (1996) – (Episode: "God's Mistake")
- Babylon 5 as Captain Charles 'Charlie' Mitchell (1997) – (Episode: "Endgame")
- Mike Hammer, Private Eye as Lord Gaffney (1998) – (Episode: "Lucky in Love")
- Passions as David Hastings (2003) – (temporary replacement)
- General Hospital as Jerry Jacks (1998–1999)
- Handy Manny as Dandy Dan
- Imagination Movers (TV Series) as Brick Ford
- The Grim Adventures of Billy & Mandy as Sir Raven
- California Dreams as Zane Walker (1995) – (Episode: "Fallen Idol")
