= Dylan Cash =

American child actor (born 1994)

- Born: Dylan Joseph Cash; November 30, 1994 (age 31); Los Angeles, California, U.S.
- Occupation: Actor
- Years active: 2001–2009

Dylan Joseph Cash (born November 30, 1994) is a former American child actor, known for his role as Michael Corinthos on ABC's daytime drama General Hospital.

== Career ==
Cash started playing Michael on General Hospital on a recurring basis in March 2002, and went on contract in April 2005. He was released from his contract in April 2008, as show executives wanted to explore recasting and ultimately aging the character of Michael. As a result, Cash's Michael suffered a gunshot wound to the head and fell into a "permanent" coma. Cash last aired on May 16, 2008, as Michael was checked into a facility for his state. Cash returned to General Hospital on December 29, 2008, for one episode, when his TV parents Sonny and Carly Corinthos visited Michael at the hospital on his birthday.

Cash was also featured in the 2004 hit Fat Albert and appeared on Sabrina the Teenage Witch as Billy.

== Filmography ==
- The Cat That Looked at a King (2004) (V) as Boy
- Fat Albert (2004) as Emmitt
- The Polar Express (2004) (voice) as Boy on Train
- Malcolm in the Middle
- Judging Amy
- Bad Santa (2003) (uncredited) as Kid on Bike
- Apple Valley Knights (2002) ('TV Series) as Wyatt
- General Hospital (2002–08) (TV Series) as Michael Morgan Corinthos III (March 2002–May 2008; December 2008)
- All You Need (2001) (as Dylan Joseph Cash) as Dylan Rempley
- Terminator: The Sarah Connor Chronicles (2008) as Bryon Dawson
- Opposite Day (2009) as Chaz

Preceded by Tiarnan Cunningham	Michael Corinthos III actor 2002–2008	Succeeded by Drew Garrett
