= Cassie Layne Winslow =

- Guiding Light character
- Nicole Forester as Cassie Layne Winslow
- Portrayed by: Laura Wright (1997–2005); Laura Stepp (2001); Nicole Forester (2005–2008)
- Duration: 1997–2008
- First appearance: August 1, 1997
- Last appearance: November 4, 2008
- Created by: James Harmon Brown and Barbara Esensten (Note: The character's scripting as the believed sister of Reva Shayne was shown in the early months of 1997, under executive producer Paul Rauch and head writers Michael Conforti, Victor Miller and Nancy Williams Watt. However, the character was further developed by head writing duo James Harmon Brown and Barbara Esensten.)
- Introduced by: Paul Rauch
- Laura Wright as Cassie Winslow
In-universe information
- Other names: Danni Shayne; Cassandra Elizabeth Rae; Cassie Layne; Princess Cassie Winslow; Cassie Lewis
- Occupation: Hotelier; Nightclub owner; First Lady of San Cristobel; Princess of San Cristobel; Secretary; Stripper
- Parents: Peter Enright; Sarah Shayne
- Stepfather: Hawk Shayne
- Half-brothers: Rusty Shayne
- Half-sisters: Reva Shayne; Roxie Shayne
- Husband: Rob Layne (until 2000); Richard Winslow (2000–2002); Edmund Winslow (2004–2005); Joshua Lewis (2007–2008)
- Children: Tammy Winslow; R.J. Winslow; Will Winslow
- Aunts: June O'Neal
- Nieces and nephews: Dylan Lewis; Marah Lewis; Shayne Lewis; Jonathan Randall; Colin O'Neill
- Other relatives: Daisy Lemay; Henry Cooper Camalletti; Sarah Randall

Cassie Layne Winslow is a fictional character from Guiding Light, an American soap opera on the CBS network. She was first portrayed by Laura Wright for an eight-year period, followed by Nicole Forester until the character's departure in 2008. Laura Stepp temporarily played the character in 2001.

== Casting and creation ==
The role of Cassie was originated by actress Laura Wright, who was known for her role as Ally Rescott on the ABC Daytime soap opera's Loving and The City. The actress premiered in the role on August 1, 1997. Actress Laura Stepp briefly stepped into the role for three episodes between January 8–10, 2001, while Wright was on maternity leave.

In September 2005, it was announced that Wright had decided not to renew her contract with the soap, calling it something she needed to do. She wrote on her official website (now defunct):

"This was such a hard decision. I can't believe that I'm saying goodbye to my Guiding Light family. It has been 8 great years, but this is something I need to do. I didn't leave because of pay cuts. I didn't leave because of any kind of drama. I left [...] because I want to try another part as an actor.

Days later, it was announced that Wright would join the ABC soap General Hospital as the fourth actress to portray character, Carly Corinthos. Guiding Light announced their decision to recast Cassie, following Wright's exit in the role.

On September 29, 2005, it was announced the newcomer Nicole Forester would replace Wright in her role as Cassie. It was said that soap actresses Cynthia Preston (ex-Faith Rosco, General Hospital) and Jensen Buchanan (ex-Marley/Vicky, Another World) were also considered for the recast of Cassie, with Forester beating both actresses out for the role. Forester previous has guest-starring roles on such series like Monk and Two and a Half Men.

Wright's last airdate as Cassie was November 3, 2005, with Forester premiering in the role the following day on November 4. In September 2008, it was announced Forester had opted to vacate the role of Cassie in favor of starting a family with her then soon-to-be husband. Forester released a statement, saying:

Yes, it's true! I am getting married in October, and I am expecting a baby in February! I am so happy and excited about embarking on these two most wonderful adventures, and I'm so grateful to have some extra time now to embrace them fully. Working at Guiding Light, with everyone in the cast, crew, and production sides, has been one of the most rewarding experiences of my career. I couldn't ask for a better work family. And to the fans: A huge THANK YOU for cheering me on and embracing me as your Cassie! I wish you all the warmth and joy that you have shared with me over these past three years!

Forester's last date as Cassie aired on November 4, 2008, exactly three years after stepping into the role.

== Storylines ==
The character of Cassie was originated by actress Laura Wright in the summer of 1997 and, except for a brief maternity leave in January 2001 (in which Laura Stepp filled in), was played by Wright until her final appearance in November 2005. Soon afterward, Nicole Forester took over the role of Cassie in November 2005, continuing to play her through November 2008. Cassie has two children, a daughter named Tammy and a son named R.J.

Cassie's entrance onto the canvas was part of a "retcon" storyline where the audience learned that Reva Shayne's mother Sarah had a child out of wedlock. After Sarah's death, Reva searched for her sister and briefly believed it was her archenemy Annie Dutton. She eventually learned it was Cassie, and the two sisters developed a relationship after Cassie moved to Springfield.

Cassie gave birth to a stillborn child before adopting Will with Richard. She would then discover that she was still fertile when she experienced a miscarriage in 2004, the result of a surprise pregnancy with Edmund. In early 2005, Cassie and Edmund decided to try to conceive via IVF but when she found out about Edmund's involvement in the Jessup barn fire that would have taken R.J.'s life had he not been rescued (by Dinah Marler, ironically), she separated from Edmund and found solace in her friendship with Jeffrey O'Neill. Desperate for a child with Cassie, Edmund took up on Dinah's offer to be a surrogate mother for Edmund. When Cassie found out about Edmund's deception, she kicked him out of the house and took in her archrival instead. She would later break up with Edmund officially when she saw him holding a shovel over Dinah's head when the latter faked an abduction (with help from Jonathan Randall).

In June 2005, Dinah revealed to Jonathan that she'd miscarried Edmund and Cassie's child weeks ago when he found an apparatus in her room that she had been using to simulate pregnancy. Cassie had no idea that Dinah was no longer with child, though the latter had revealed this to Edmund, who convinced her to continue the charade. In a stunning plot twist, Edmund hatched a plan to dupe both Cassie and Michelle Bauer by stealing Michelle Bauer's baby, passing it off to Cassie as their baby, and telling Cassie that Dinah, whom he had locked up, had run off after giving birth. After the death of her daughter Tammy in 2007 and her marriage and then divorce from ex-brother-in-law Josh Lewis resulting from her brief and disastrous affair with Cyrus Foley and her adopted troubled son Will being sent away to reform school, Cassie moved to Hawaii with her son RJ to start a new life near the end of 2008.

=== Marriages ===
Cassie has been married 5 different times. Her first husband was Rob Layne whom Cassie divorced a year after her arrival in Springfield, in 1998. After the murder of her fiancé Hart Jessup, Cassie married Prince Richard Winslow in 2000 on a strictly business arrangement. It would be agreed that Cassie would give the San Cristoballian Republic a legitimate heir to the throne in exchange for Prince Richard aiding her in her financial troubles. However, after it was discovered that Rob Layne hadn't signed divorce papers, her marriage to Prince Richard was ruled invalid. After Cassie successfully divorced Rob, she remarried Prince Richard whom she remained with until his death 2 years later. Cassie later married Prince Richard's brother Ambassador Edmund Winslow from December 2004 to November 2005 and to her former brother-in-law, Joshua Lewis. Cassie is currently living in Hawaii with her son R.J. living off her own income from the salvage of the Beacon Hotel.
