= Chad Duell =

American actor

- Born: Chad Louis Duell; September 14, 1987 (age 38)
- Occupation: Actor
- Years active: 2008–present
- Known for: Performance in American soap opera television
- Television: General Hospital (2010–2025)
- Spouse: Taylor Novack (m. 2012; ann. 2012)
- Partner(s): Courtney Hope (2016–2021); Luana Lucci (2022–present)
- Children: 1

Chad Louis Duell (born September 14, 1987) is an American actor. He is recognized for playing Michael Corinthos on the American soap opera General Hospital.

Duell's portrayal of Michael Corinthos garnered him nominations for the Daytime Emmy Award for Outstanding Younger Actor in a Drama Series in 2011, 2012 and 2014. This was followed by his nomination and win for the Daytime Emmy Award for Outstanding Supporting Actor in a Drama Series in 2015.

== Education and career ==
Duell attended Mountainside Middle School and Desert Mountain High School in Scottsdale, Arizona, where he played football and participated in the theater program. He dropped out before what would have been his senior year to pursue an acting career.

After dropping out he moved to Los Angeles where he landed a minor role on Disney's hit sitcom, The Suite Life on Deck. Duell also booked a minor role on another Disney series, The Wizards of Waverly Place. In March 2010, it was announced he would replace Drew Garrett in the role of Michael Corinthos on General Hospital. In 2017, it was announced Duell would appear in the third season of the Amazon Prime series The Bay in the role of Adam Kenway. In November 2024, he announced his exit from General Hospital. His final episode aired on January 21 of the following year.

== Personal life ==
Duell proposed to his girlfriend of nine months, Taylor Novack, at Disney World in August 2011. The couple married in a private ceremony on September 15, 2012. The marriage was annulled in late 2012, with Duell saying that it had been too soon. Duell dated fellow actress Courtney Hope, and the two were engaged on Valentine's Day 2021 after five years of dating. The couple had a commitment ceremony on October 23, 2021, and split less than two months later. In January 2022, Duell revealed neither he nor Hope had "signed anything" and stated they were not "married or anything." In 2022, he began dating Luana Lucci. In March 2023, the couple revealed on Instagram that they were expecting their first child, a boy, who was born in September of the same year.

== Filmography ==
Television
Year	Title	Role	Notes
2008	Wizards of Waverly Place	Ronald Longcape, Jr.	Guest role, 2 episodes ("Saving Wiz Tech: Parts 1 & 2")
2008	The Suite Life on Deck	Holden	Recurring role; 2 episodes ("International Dateline", "Boo You")
2010–2025	General Hospital	Michael Corinthos	Series regular; April 20, 2010, to January 21, 2025
2012	Youth Pastor Kevin	Shared Saves Wall	TV series short
2017	The Bay	Adam Kenway	Season 3, series regular
2018	Lethal Admirer	Jack	TV film
2020	Arrow	Trevor	Season 8, episode 9 ("Green Arrow & the Canaries")

== Awards and nominations ==
List of acting awards and nominations
Year	Award	Category	Title	Result	Ref.
2011	Daytime Emmy Award	Outstanding Younger Actor in a Drama Series	General Hospital	Nominated	
2012	Daytime Emmy Award	Outstanding Younger Actor in a Drama Series	General Hospital	Nominated	
2014	Daytime Emmy Award	Outstanding Younger Actor in a Drama Series	General Hospital	Nominated	
2015	Daytime Emmy Award	Outstanding Supporting Actor in a Drama Series	General Hospital	Won	
2017	Daytime Emmy Award	Outstanding Supporting Actor in a Drama Series	General Hospital	Nominated	
2018	Daytime Emmy Award	Outstanding Guest Performer in a Digital Daytime Drama Series	The Bay	Nominated	
2023	Daytime Emmy Award	Outstanding Supporting Actor in a Drama Series	General Hospital	Nominated	

Preceded by Drew Garrett	Role of Michael Corinthos on General Hospital; 2010–present	Succeeded by Incumbent
