= Jerry Jacks =

- General Hospital character
- Sebastian Roché as Jerry Jacks
- Portrayed by: Julian Stone (1998–1999); Sebastian Roché (2007–2015)
- Duration: 1998–1999; 2007–2010; 2012–2015
- First appearance: April 10, 1998
- Last appearance: December 22, 2015
- Created by: Robert Guza, Jr.
- Introduced by: Wendy Riche (1998); Jill Farren Phelps (2007); Frank Valentini (2012)
- Book appearances: The Secret Life of Damian Spinelli
In-universe information
- Other names: James Craig; James Brosnan; Mr. Moreau; John Jacks; John Jacks, Jr.
- Occupation: Criminal; Terrorist
- Parents: John Jacks; Jane Jacks
- Siblings: Jasper Jacks
- Children: Jude Jacks
- Nieces and nephews: Josslyn Jacks

Jerry Jacks is a fictional character on the ABC soap opera, General Hospital. He was portrayed by Julian Stone from April 10, 1998 to December 14, 1999. In January 2007, the role was recast with Sebastian Roché, who was initially introduced as a terrorist named Mr. Craig, with his true identity remaining hidden until a few months later. Roche has held the role sporadically since, with his latest arc occurring from August to September 2012. He returned for one episode on December 18, 2012 and made a second return for multiple episodes starting September 30, 2013. After last appearing on December 3, 2013, Roché made several guest appearances throughout October 2014. He once again reprised the role of Jerry on December 10, 2015.

== Background ==
Jerry is originally from Australia, but he and his family moved to Alaska. He is described as being a playboy, never bothering with love, just in it for fun and games.

== Storylines ==
=== 2007–10 ===
Jerry Jacks returned to Port Charles in January 2007, as James Craig, a mysterious man with ties to Lorenzo Alcazar. In February, he and a team of masked gunmen invaded the Metro Court Hotel and held numerous employees and guests hostage in order to steal a briefcase held in the hotel's vault by Alcazar. Sam McCall activated the silent alarm, locking the vault and alerting the cops who arrived within minutes. During this time, Jerry (as Mr. Craig) tormented the hostages, especially Carly Corinthos. He shot Robin Scorpio, and forced Carly and medical intern Emily Quartermaine to perform crude surgery on her in the hotel lobby while Robin's boyfriend, Dr. Patrick Drake, gave instructions by phone. Craig also forced Alan Quartermaine to suffer through an untreated heart attack (which later proved fatal). Sam, aided by Jason Morgan, was able to escape and told the police that the lobby was rigged with explosives. A rescue attempt was launched, and Craig triggered the explosives, escaping in the confusion. Jason tracked him down, and was able to wound him before rushing to the side of his dying father, Alan.

A short time after the hostage crisis, Jerry showed up at Wyndemere, as James Brosnan, and poisoned Nikolas Cassadine, injecting him with a neurotoxin which would kill him in 24 hours unless a counteragent was administered daily. He blackmailed Nikolas into creating a false identity for him, breaking up with Emily, and pretending to have a relationship with Robin, whom he'd forced to break up with Patrick. While at Wyndemere, Jerry has several encounters with Nikolas's aunt, Alexis Davis, who was unaware of his involvement with the hostage crisis.

In April, it is revealed that Craig/Brosnan was actually Jerry Jacks. He was being pressured by his mother, Lady Jane, and brother Jasper Jacks to attend Jax's upcoming wedding to Carly. On April 30, 2007, Jerry tried to observe the wedding, hiding in the shadows, but is spotted and recognized by his mother, even though he'd had plastic surgery. Jerry went to Carly's house knowing that she and Jax were still on their honeymoon, and that his mother was there watching Carly's sons, Michael and Morgan. The next day, Ric Lansing brought Carly a picture from the Metro Court surveillance camera of "Mr. Craig" for her to identify. After Ric left, Michael and Morgan told Carly that the man in the picture was "Jax's brother, Jerry."

General Hospital's head-writer Robert Guza, Jr. has stated on Jerry's change in character, "However much a troublemaker or a wild card Jerry was, he never would have done the things that Mr. Craig did. We will explain the transformation, what 'turned him.' You've got to psychologically explain how could this person do this... and we will."

It was revealed that Craig was forced to watch the brutal murder of a woman he had been in love with. The killers then tasked him with recovering the briefcase, threatening his death if he didn't get it. On July 31, Jerry's former lover, Irina is revealed to be alive and holding Jax against his will. Irina planned to murder Jax in front of Jerry, as revenge for betraying her. Irina raped Jax and then called Carly. After seeing Jerry kill Irina with no hesitation, Jax told him he did not want him in his life anymore.

Jerry threatened Sam into seducing Trevor Lansing to get information on Anthony Zacchara. He was stabbed by Nikolas, but made a full recovery. On May 18, 2008, Jerry met and stabbed Anthony's daughter, Claudia. A month later, he began a fling with Alexis. It was revealed that Jerry had been posing as Mr. Moreau, a lethal drug dealer who was out to get Johnny Zacchara. He was also working with Dr. Ian Devlin, trying to acquire Alcazar's warehouse property.

Then, Jerry started working with Russian mob boss Andrei Karpov. When Sam went undercover working for Karpov to prove that Jerry was working with him, he had her framed and sent to jail. Once she was released, Jerry tried to kill Sam by placing a bomb in a dumpster, but she was saved by Jason. He then kidnapped her and took her to a ship where he planned to blow up the ship with Sam onboard and fake his own death. Jason once again rescued Sam, and they barely escaped as the ship exploded with Jerry on board. Although Jerry was presumed dead, Jax received an anonymous phone call from someone who didn't say a word, leading Jax to believe his brother was still alive.

Weeks later, Claudia receives a DVD with a cryptic message from Jerry, very much alive. He stated that he'd hidden several DVDs in Sonny Corinthos's house, detailing her part in Michael's shooting. It was up to her to find the DVDs before anyone else who would expose her. Claudia, who was now married to Sonny, frantically searched for the DVDs, and was caught in the act when Sonny's ex, Kate Howard, found one and discovered what Claudia had done.

On April 7, 2009, Carly answered the phone in Jax's office, only to find that it was Jerry on the other end of the line.

On July 30, 2009, Claudia sent Jerry down to Mexico to get revenge on Michael for her miscarriage. A few days later, Claudia called to tell Jerry that Michael was not responsible for her miscarriage, but that Alexis Davis had "confessed" to the crime. However, Jerry refused to believe her, and continued to search for Michael. Jerry ran into Sam, who was helping Jason search for Michael and Kristina Corinthos-Davis. Jerry used Sam to lure Jason out to an abandoned church, and after the roof collapsed over Jason, he shot him twice before leaving him for dead. When Jerry returned, Jason and Sam were gone (hiding in the ceiling).

On December 13, 2010, Jerry returned to Port Charles, picking up the body of a criminal's son, and realized Jason was there, waiting to capture him. Lucky Spencer had set up a roadblock to trap him, but Jerry ran his car over a cliff, supposedly dying. However, he showed up later at Jax's house when Carly walked in on him playing with her and Jax's infant daughter, Josslyn. He gave Josslyn back to Carly, and told her he was there to take care of Brenda. Jax arrived and told Jerry to leave Brenda alone. Then Jerry pulled a gun on Carly, saying that he'll leave Jax and Josslyn alone, but he doesn't care about Brenda and Carly. Jax lets him go to protect Carly.

It is revealed Jerry is working for Theo Hoffman aka The Balkan. During a meeting with Siobhan McKenna, Jerry is shot by an unseen person, causing him to fall into the water and be presumed dead. The shooter is later revealed to be Shawn Butler.

=== 2012-15 ===
In August 2012, Jerry resurfaced at Wyndemere, meeting with Dr. Ewen Keenan, revealing that he orchestrated the abduction of Robin Scorpio-Drake (under the orders of Cesar Faison masquerading as Duke Lavery). Jerry injects Alexis Davis and Josslyn Jacks with an unknown substance. Then he goes to Atlantic City, to recruit an imprisoned Joe Scully Jr. to help him poison the Port Charles water supply. He purchases the local TV access channel from Todd Manning, to broadcast his plan. It is revealed that he injected Alexis and Josslyn with antidotes. Jerry takes Alexis hostage and tries to leave town via boat. A shootout causes an explosion on the docks, and Jerry is presumed dead.

In Switzerland, Dr. Liesl Obrecht, working for Faison, is seen with Robin, who is being held hostage. Obrecht tells an unknown man that Faison has been captured, and she didn't know what to do with Robin. The man is revealed to be Jerry, who asks Robin what he should do with her as she looks on in fear.

In August 2013 Luke Spencer and Holly Sutton discovered that Jerry had been hiding in Corinth, Pennsylvania, where he was operating a secret laboratory in the old Alden house. Laura Spencer-Baldwin discovered him there but he overpowered her and got away.

In September 2013 Luke caught up with Jerry at Cassadine Island where he discovered that Jerry had been manufacturing a cure for polonium poisoning. The person doing the research - whom Jerry referred to as "my physician" - was Dr. Robin Scorpio-Drake, who is being held captive by Jerry in a laboratory. Since Luke is also dying of polonium poisoning Jerry has decided to keep Luke alive as a guinea pig to test any cure Robin presents him. Jerry believes Robin will try to poison him with a bogus cure, so he wants to give the first dose to Luke to see what happens. Eventually Robin develops the cure and gives it to Jerry and he goes to see Luke, Jerry attempts to test the cure on Luke but Tracy points a gun at Jerry and demands he fill the syringe with the full dose Jerry does so and Tracy takes the syringe from him and gives the dose to Luke, Jerry was not pleased and attempted to attack Luke but Tracy shot him in the shoulder and took Luke and Left Cassadine Island, Jerry later goes to see Robin and tells her the cure was stolen and demands she find a way to make another cure.

In December 2013, he and Luke were fighting on the rooftop of the Metro Court Hotel. After falling, he fled the city with the help of Julian Jerome.

Jerry briefly returned in October 2014, where he was able to trick Tracy Quartermaine into giving him ELQ shares in exchange for returning her husband to her. Tracy was under the assumption that the husband in question was Luke, but in fact, Jerry returned Larry Ashton to her. Larry would later be revealed to be in cahoots with Faison, Helena, and Jerry. Special Agent Kyle Sloane then comes to Port Charles after Jerry is still on the run and nowhere to be found. The aftermath lead to Michael committing obstruction of justice about ELQ shares.

Robin was being held hostage at Cassadine Island trying to develop a way to keep Helena Cassadine alive but she died before Robin could finish, In December 2015 it was revealed that Robin was being held by Jerry Jacks and he was very interested in a way to stay alive forever which he could sell to highest bidder, Robin was working on the project but it wasn't quite finished, Jerry saw her as a liability and wanted to kill her because her parents pose a serious threat while Robin's best friend Sonny is disabled by Jerry's new accomplice Paul Hornsby who later became the district attorney of Port Charles. Robin begged for more time to finish and Jerry gave her 48 hours to come up with something or die. Robin made progress and showed Jerry but since it could take years before it could be fully perfected Jerry deemed that as failure and told Robin it was over and left afterwards Jerry told a man to kill Robin. Jerry was not pleased that the man had not yet killed Robin and told him to get it done afterwards Jerry returned and yet Robin was not dead yet and threatened the man to either kill her or Jerry would kill him while Jerry was gonna destroy all the evidence since Jerry found out Anna, Robert and Patrick were on the island. Later on Anna, Robert and Patrick made their way to the room where Robin was and busted the door open and Jerry was there, Patrick grabbed him and demanded to know where Robin is and Jerry replied Robin is dead. He later surrenders to the authorities and is sent to prison after Jordan Ashford became the commissioner of the Port Charles Police Department who she informed it to Jerry's accomplice Paul about it.

=== 2019 ===
On June 21, 2019, during a chat between Robert and Jax it was revealed that Jerry had escaped from Steinmauer and Robert threatened to find him and dismember him if he so much as checked the weather in Berkeley, California.
