= Laura Wright =

American actress (born 1970)

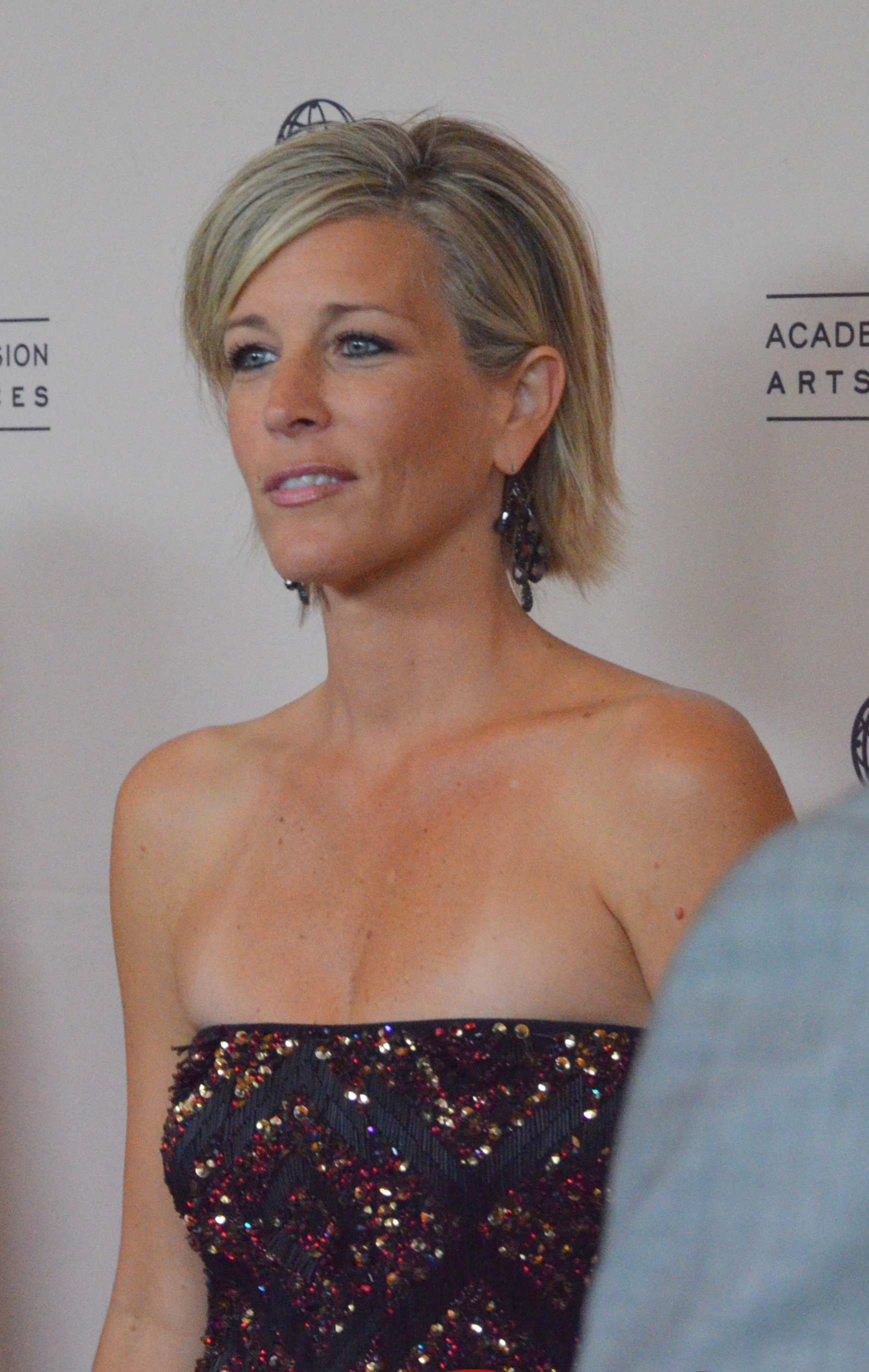
- Wright in 2013
- Born: September 11, 1970 (age 56); Washington, D.C., U.S.
- Occupation: Actress
- Years active: 1991–present
- Known for: Loving and The City as Ally Rescott; Guiding Light as Cassie Layne Winslow; General Hospital as Carly Corinthos
- Spouse: John Wright (m. 1995; div. 2016)
- Children: 2

Laura Wright (née Sisk, born September 11, 1970) is an American actress. She is best known for playing the roles of Allison "Ally" Rescott on Loving (1991 to 1995) and The City (1995 to 1997), Cassie Layne Winslow on Guiding Light (1997 to 2005) and Carly Corinthos (Spencer) on General Hospital (2005 to present). She won a Daytime Emmy Award for Outstanding Lead Actress in a Drama Series for her role on General Hospital in 2011. She has since received six more nominations in the same category. She should not be confused with recording engineer and mixer Laura Sisk, who worked for (among others) Taylor Swift and Lady Gaga.

== Early life ==
Wright was born in Washington, D.C. and raised in Clinton, Maryland. She appeared in several high school plays such as Gypsy, Our Town, and You Can't Take It with You. She also directed a school production of Father Says No. She appeared in a few local commercials and numerous fashion shows. After high school, Wright attended one semester of college before leaving and taking a full time job at a gas station owned by her father in Clinton.

== Career ==
While working at her father's gas station, Wright took an acting class. The teacher submitted a videotape of her students to the ABC soap opera Loving. Wright almost missed the taping because she overslept that day. The show responded, and Wright (then using her maiden name of Sisk), flew to New York City for a screen test. She was cast as Allison "Ally" Rescott, playing the role from 1991 until the show's cancellation in 1995. She then played the same role on The City, a spin off of Loving, from 1995 to 1997.

After the cancellation of The City, Wright joined the cast of the CBS soap opera Guiding Light as Cassie Layne Winslow in August 1997. She won a Soap Opera Digest Award for Favorite New Character for her role on Guiding Light in 1998. Wright decided to leave the show when her contract expired in October 2005. She said her exit wasn't related to budget cuts or backstage drama, she simply wanted to try other opportunities. Her final airdate was November 3, 2005. The role was recast.

On September 12, 2005, it was announced that Wright would begin playing Carly Corinthos on the ABC soap opera General Hospital. She was the fourth actress to play the role, succeeding Jennifer Bransford. ABC Daytime executive Brian Frons said in a statement, "Carly is a complex character, and we are excited to bring Laura's talent, beauty and intelligence to this role." Wright's first airdate was November 4, 2005, the day after her final episode of Guiding Light aired.

In 2011, after twenty years on daytime soap operas, Wright received her first Daytime Emmy Award nomination. She was nominated for Outstanding Lead Actress for her role on General Hospital and won the award. Wright was nominated again in the same category in 2012. She also received nominations in 2015, 2017 to 2019, and 2022.

In 2013, Wright guest starred on an episode of the VH1 series Hit the Floor. In 2015, she made a cameo appearance in the film Joy, alongside General Hospital co-stars Maurice Benard and Donna Mills. She starred as Dr. Lori Hanson in the Lifetime film Deadly Patient (also titled Stalked by My Patient) in 2018.

== Personal life ==
Wright announced her engagement to architect John Wright in August 1995. They had dated on and off throughout high school and college before reuniting a few years later. John proposed to her in the back of a New York taxi at 10 o'clock at night. The wedding was originally scheduled for June 1, 1996. They were married on October 7, 1995. They have a daughter, who was born in 1998, and a son, who was born in 2000. In April 2016, Wright announced that she and John had decided to end their marriage.

Wright has been in a relationship with her former General Hospital co-star Wes Ramsey since 2017. They first met several years earlier, when they worked together on Guiding Light.

== Filmography ==
List of acting performances in film and television
Year	Title	Role	Notes
1991–1995	Loving	Ally Rescott Bowman	Contract role; June 25, 1991 – November 10, 1995
1991–1992	All My Children	Ally Rescott Bowman	Guest appearances; December 31, 1991 – January 2, 1992
1995–1997	The City	Ally Rescott Bowman	Contract role; November 13, 1995 – March 28, 1997
1997–2005	Guiding Light	Cassie Layne Winslow	Contract role; August 1, 1997 – November 3, 2005
2005–present	General Hospital	Carly Corinthos; Lena Eckert Spencer; Beatrice Eckert	Contract role; November 4, 2005–present; Role held: April 1, 2015 and July 23, 2015; Role held: November 2, 2020
2013	Hit the Floor	Dance Teacher	Episode: "Moving Screens"
2015	Joy	Clarinda	Cameo appearance
2018	Deadly Patient	Dr. Lori Hanson	Television film

== Awards and nominations ==
Year	Award	Category	Title	Result	Ref.
1993	Soap Opera Digest Award	Outstanding Younger Lead Actress	Loving	Nominated	
1994	Soap Opera Digest Award	Hottest Female Star	Loving	Nominated	
1998	Soap Opera Digest Award	Favorite New Character	Guiding Light	Won	
2011	Daytime Emmy Award	Outstanding Lead Actress in a Drama Series	General Hospital	Won	
2012	Daytime Emmy Award	Outstanding Lead Actress in a Drama Series	General Hospital	Nominated	
2015	Daytime Emmy Award	Outstanding Lead Actress in a Drama Series	General Hospital	Nominated	
2017	Daytime Emmy Award	Outstanding Lead Actress in a Drama Series	General Hospital	Nominated	
2018	Daytime Emmy Award	Outstanding Lead Actress in a Drama Series	General Hospital	Nominated	
2019	Daytime Emmy Award	Outstanding Lead Actress in a Drama Series	General Hospital	Nominated	
2020	Soap Hub Awards	Favorite Actress from General Hospital	General Hospital	Won	
2020	Soap Hub Awards	Favorite Social Media Star		Nominated	
2021	Soap Hub Awards	Favorite Feud	General Hospital	Won	
2021	Soap Hub Awards	Favorite Actress from General Hospital	General Hospital	Won	
2022	Daytime Emmy Award	Outstanding Lead Actress in a Drama Series	General Hospital	Nominated	
2025	Daytime Emmy Award	Outstanding Lead Actress in a Drama Series	General Hospital	Nominated	

First	Cassie Layne Winslow (role); 1997–2005	Succeeded by Nicole Forester
Preceded by Jennifer Bransford	Carly Corinthos (role); 2005–present	Incumbent
