= Bryan Craig =

American actor

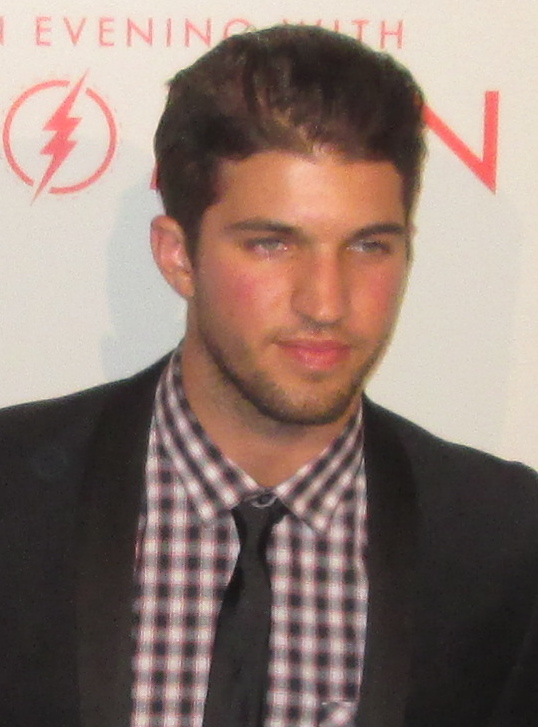
- Craig in 2014
- Born: Bryan Allen Craig; October 27, 1991 (age 34); Boca Raton, Florida, U.S.
- Occupation: Actor
- Years active: 2005–present

Bryan Allen Craig (born October 27, 1991) is a Cuban-American actor. He is best known for playing Morgan Corinthos in the soap opera General Hospital and Joaquin Perez in Good Trouble.

== Early life ==
Craig was born Bryan Allen Craig in Boca Raton, Florida, on October 27, 1991 to Lissett (née Martinez) and Donnie Craig. He has a younger brother named Bradley Allen Craig. His first acting role was at age fourteen in the 2005 movie Off the Chain. He later left Florida to pursue an acting career in Los Angeles.

== Career ==
After moving to Los Angeles, Craig was cast as Justin in the 2011 film Christmas Spirit. He next appeared on The Nine Lives of Chloe King in 2011, and had a recurring role on Bucket & Skinner's Epic Adventures from 2011 to 2012.

On April 17, 2013, ABC confirmed that Craig had been cast in the role of Morgan Corinthos on General Hospital. He began taping his first scenes on April 15. Craig later told Soap Opera Digest that he was hesitant to do a soap. However, the role of Morgan changed his mind about daytime. It was his parents who convinced him to sign a three-year contract. Angela Durrell of TV Source described the character of Morgan as "[s]ensitive and emotionally wounded." Morgan craves "strong ties" and stability. Mara Levinsky described Craig's Morgan as "impulsive" and "imperfect." Michael Logan described Craig's Morgan as a "marvelous muddle of puppy awkwardness and testy testosterone." When asked about his character's "casual and low-key," wardrobe, despite his family being filthy rich, Craig said Morgan is all about quick cash, but "far from snooty." He is the kind of guy that sleeps all day, and eats pizza for breakfast. His sense of style reflects his laid back personality. Susan Hornik described Craig's Morgan as a "Prince Harry-esque, bad boy." Since taking on the role of Morgan, Craig has been nominated at the Daytime Emmy Awards in the category of Outstanding Younger Actor in a Drama Series, and won the award in 2016. On September 15, 2016, Craig announced via Instagram that he had decided to exit the series.

After leaving General Hospital, Craig appeared in the recurring role of Sgt Adam Coogan in The CW series Valor from 2017 to 2018. In 2019, he began starring as Javi Mendoza in the ABC drama Grand Hotel.

== Personal life ==
Craig was previously engaged to his General Hospital co-star Kelly Thiebaud.

== Filmography ==
=== Film ===
Year	Title	Character	Notes
2005	Off the Chain	Jason Evridge	Credited as Bryan Allen Craig
2011	Christmas Spirit	Justin	
2020	The Ride	Jack	
2020	American Fighter	Ryan	
2021	Women Is Losers	Mateo	
2022	That's Amor	Richard	

=== Television ===
Year	Title	Character	Notes
2011	The Nine Lives of Chloe King	Jonah Mimby	S1 E6 "Nothing Compares 2 U"
2011–2012	Bucket & Skinner's Epic Adventures	Blake Dunkirk	Recurring role
2013–2016, 2018, 2024	General Hospital	Morgan Corinthos	Contract role
2017–2018	Valor	Sgt Adam Coogan	Recurring role
2019	Grand Hotel	Javi Mendoza	Series regular
2022–2024	Good Trouble	Joaquin Perez	Series regular

== Awards and nominations ==
List of acting awards and nominations
Year	Award	Category	Title	Result	Ref.
2014	Daytime Emmy Award	Outstanding Younger Actor in a Drama Series	General Hospital	Nominated	
2015	Daytime Emmy Award	Outstanding Younger Actor in a Drama Series	General Hospital	Nominated	
2016	Daytime Emmy Award	Outstanding Younger Actor in a Drama Series	General Hospital	Won	
2017	Daytime Emmy Award	Outstanding Younger Actor in a Drama Series	General Hospital	Won	
