= Drew Garrett =

American actor (born 1989)

- Born: Drew Garrett Nelson; April 21, 1989 (age 36); Jupiter, Florida, U.S.
- Occupation: Actor
- Years active: 2002–present

Drew Garrett Nelson (born April 21, 1989) is an American actor. He is best known for playing Michael Corinthos in 2009–10, in the soap opera General Hospital, a role for which he received a Daytime Emmy Award nomination.

== Early life and education ==
Garrett was born in Jupiter, Florida, to Randy Nelson and Karole Cooney, a former Kravis Center front-of-house manager. He attended Dreyfoos School of the Arts and played varsity soccer. He moved to Los Angeles with his mother in 2005, graduating from the Los Angeles County High School for the Arts with the theater class of 2007. His older brother Brett is a professional speed-boarder.

== Career ==
In 2002, while living in Florida, Garrett made his first acting appearance as a student in an etiquette video for children. After moving to Los Angeles three years later, he landed guest appearances on Nickelodeon's True Jackson VP and the CBS drama Criminal Minds.

In 2009, Garrett was cast as Michael Corinthos III on General Hospital. He appeared in 170 episodes from 2009–10 and earned a Daytime Emmy Award nomination for Outstanding Younger Actor in a Drama Series in 2010. In 2011, Garrett took a guest-star role on the prime-time CBS series The Mentalist. He landed his first feature film role in Divorce Invitation in 2012. The same year, Garrett starred in the premiere episode of Anthony Zuiker's series Black Box TV. He also played Jesse Simms in the web series Never Fade Away; the pilot episode was released April 2, 2012. In 2016, he co-starred in 78 episodes of the streaming television series Youthful Daze.

== Filmography ==
- 2002: Kravis Center as Andy (educational video)
- 2005: My Super Sweet 16 (television) as himself (1 episode)
- 2008–09: Upstairs Girls (streaming television) as Colin (Webshow)
- 2008: True Jackson VP (television) as Skateboarder (1 episode)
- 2008: Criminal Minds (television) as Rick Hannity (1 episode)
- 2008: Cougars as Colin (2 episodes)
- 2009–10: General Hospital (television) as Michael Corinthos III (170 Episodes)
- 2011: The Mentalist (television) as Jeff Loomis (1 episode)
- 2011: Glassy (short film) as Luc (and producer)
- 2012: BlackBox TV (television) as Nick (1 episode)
- 2012: Never Fade Away (television) as Jesse Simms
- 2011: Divorce Invitation (film) as Joey
- 2014: Fort Bliss (film) as Specialist Cook
- 2016: Youthful Daze (streaming television) as Jimmy Lowe (78 episodes)
- 2016: The Tiger Hunter (film) as Derrick
- 2016: 12 Deadly Days (streaming television) as Theo (TV miniseries) (1 episode)
- 2019: Buying Time (film) as Adam Demus
- 2019: Dauntless: The Battle of Midway (film) as McClusky
- 2019: Man in Hoodie (short film) as Zig Zag
- 2024: Plan B (film) as Kyle
- 2025: Law & Order: Special Victims Unit (television) as Paul Ellis (1 episode)
