= Elizabeth Webber =

Fictional character from General Hospital

- General Hospital character
- Rebecca Herbst as Elizabeth Webber
- Portrayed by: Rebecca Herbst (1997–present); Martha Madison (2011); Ariebella Makana (2022)
- Duration: 1997–present
- First appearance: August 1, 1997
- Created by: Janet Iacobuzio and Christopher Whitesell
- Introduced by: Wendy Riche
- Book appearances: The Secret Life of Damian Spinelli
- Spin-off appearances: General Hospital: Night Shift
In-universe information
- Other names: Elizabeth Imogene Webber; Elizabeth Lansing; Elizabeth Spencer; Elizabeth Baldwin
- Occupation: Head nurse; Surgical nurse; Waitress; Artist; Deception model
- Family: Hardy; Webber
- Parents: Jeff Webber; Carolyn Webber
- Sisters: Sarah Webber
- Half-brothers: Steve Webber
- Half-sisters: Hayden Barnes
- Husband: Ric Lansing (2003–2004); Lucky Spencer (2005–2007); Franco Baldwin (2019–2021)
- Sons: Cameron Webber; Jake Webber; Aiden Spencer
- Grandparents: Steve Hardy; Helene Webber; Audrey Hardy (step)
- Uncles: Tom Hardy (adoptive); Rick Webber
- Aunts: Terri Webber
- Nieces and nephews: Violet Finn
- First cousins: Tommy Hardy (adoptive); Laura Spencer (adoptive); Mike Webber (adoptive); Rick Webber, Jr.

Elizabeth Webber is a fictional character from General Hospital, an American soap opera on the ABC network, played by Rebecca Herbst. Elizabeth is the granddaughter of the show's original lead character, Steve Hardy (John Beradino) and daughter of Jeff Webber (Richard Dean Anderson). Introduced on August 1, 1997, as a rebellious teenager, Elizabeth comes to live with her grandmother Audrey Hardy (Rachel Ames) and sister Sarah Webber (Jennifer Sky). Feeling abandoned by her parents, Elizabeth is a wild child with no regard for her life. In 1998, after she is kidnapped, beaten, and raped, Elizabeth goes from a rebellious teenager to a terrified timid girl. She finds comfort with Lucky Spencer (Jonathan Jackson) and they fall in love. The duo's endearing young love story propels them into supercouple status in the same vein as Lucky's famous parents, Luke and Laura (Anthony Geary and Genie Francis). Elizabeth and Lucky's (then Greg Vaughan) rocky marriages ultimately end in divorce. Their failed reunion in 2009 results in Elizabeth's affair with Lucky's half-brother Nikolas Cassadine (Tyler Christopher), and her giving birth to Lucky's son, Aiden. In 2006, in the midst of her chaotic marriage to Lucky, Elizabeth has an affair with her long time friend, mob hitman Jason Morgan (Steve Burton) which leads to the birth of her middle son, Jake whom Lucky initially raises as his own. Jason and Elizabeth would also achieve supercouple status. Elizabeth later marries reformed serial killer Franco Baldwin (Roger Howarth) in 2019, but the marriage ends when he is killed.

Having played one of the show's most beloved characters, Herbst has earned three Daytime Emmy Award nominations for her portrayal of Elizabeth, in 1999, 2007 and 2012. The popularity of both the actress and character was put on full display in 2011, when her sudden firing from the series sparked massive viewer backlash that ultimately led to her rehiring.

== Casting ==
Rebecca Herbst originally auditioned for the role of Sarah Webber. Although she did not get the part, General Hospital created the role of Sarah's sister Elizabeth for Herbst to play, and she debuted on August 1, 1997. Rumors circulated about Herbst's departure, starting when her on-screen love interest Jonathan Jackson (Lucky Spencer) left the series in April 1999, continuing through Herbst's contract expiration in the summer of 2000. Herbst re-signed in July for three years. In November, Herbst guest starred along with Jacob Young (then-Lucky Spencer) and Jacklyn Zeman (Bobbie Spencer) on the FOX network sketch comedy series MADtv, making a small cameo as Elizabeth. On January 18, 2011, ABC Daytime announced that Herbst had been let go from General Hospital and her exit would be storyline dictated. After much fan protest, a month after the original announcement, ABC released another statement saying that Herbst would retain her role on the show. Richard M. Simms, executive editor of Soaps In Depth discussed the fans' impact on reversal, stating:

A lot of times, fans react and for a few days, it's all anyone can talk about. But Becky Herbst fans really refused to let this drop.

In May 2011, it was confirmed that Herbst would take medical leave, due to viral meningitis. The role was temporarily portrayed by actress Martha Madison, known for her role as Belle Black on Days of Our Lives, from June 8–20, 2011. In March 2012, it was confirmed by Soap Opera Digest that Herbst had renewed her contract to continue performing in her role as Elizabeth.

In February 2016, Daytime Confidential reported that contract negotiations between Herbst and the show had reached a stalemate, also that Days of Our Lives has expressed interest in hiring Herbst possibly as the potential replacement for Kate Mansi, who had vacated the role of Abigail Deveraux. One month later in March 2016, it was revealed that Herbst will remain with the show. However, the character took a brief hiatus from the show, facilitating the absence in which Herbst had her contract talks, she briefly departed on April 5, 2016, and returned on May 4, 2016.

== Storylines ==
Elizabeth arrives in August 1997 to stay with her grandmother, Audrey Hardy (Rachel Ames), and her sister, Sarah Webber (then Jennifer Sky). She quickly develops a crush on Lucky Spencer (then Jonathan Jackson), but Lucky is interested in Sarah. On Valentine's Day, Elizabeth is raped and Lucky rescues her and helps her recover. They become close and eventually fall in love, exchanging vows by themselves. When Lucky is presumed dead, Jason Morgan (then Steve Burton) helps Elizabeth deal with her loss. Lucky (then Jacob Young) is found alive, but pushes away his parents and Elizabeth. It is soon evident he has been brainwashed. In 2001, Lucky proposes to Elizabeth in an effort to fight the mind control, but Helena removes Lucky's memories of love for Elizabeth. Elizabeth fakes her death to help Nikolas Cassadine (then Coltin Scott) prove his loyalty to Helena, and Lucky's visions of Elizabeth help him stop Helena's control. In December, Elizabeth stops their wedding when she realizes Lucky has been unable to regain his love for her. They try to start over but struggle, and Elizabeth breaks up with him after she finds him kissing Sarah. Elizabeth is kidnapped and locked in a crypt, and Zander Smith (Chad Brannon) gets trapped with her. They set off a gas leak, and become intimate when they think they are going to die. Elizabeth tries dating Jason, but ends things when Jason lies to her. Elizabeth falls in love with Ric Lansing (Rick Hearst), and they marry after she gets pregnant. Elizabeth miscarries, which Ric blames on his brother, Sonny Corinthos (Maurice Benard). He kidnaps Sonny's wife, Carly (then Tamara Braun), and locks her in a panic room in an attempt to steal their unborn child. To maintain his secret, Ric begins drugging Elizabeth which results in a pulmonary embolism. Upon discovering Ric's crimes, Elizabeth divorces Ric. Elizabeth renews her friendship with Jason Morgan when Elizabeth's best friend and Jason's sister, Emily Quartermaine (Natalia Livingston) is on her death bed. Soon after she is struck by a car and loses her sight. After regaining her sight, she and Ric begin to make amends but she is uncertain of a future with him. Elizabeth has sex with her friend, Zander, who is mourning the end of his relationship with Emily. Soon after, Elizabeth learns she is pregnant, she and Ric reconcile; he agrees to raise the child and they remarry. Elizabeth divorces Ric again when she realizes he will not give up his obsession with Sonny. Zander dies in a police shootout. Elizabeth gives birth to a son named Cameron and becomes a nurse.

Elizabeth and Lucky help Nikolas and Emily evade Helena, and get back together. Their financial struggles prompt Elizabeth to become a surrogate mother for Courtney Matthews (Alicia Leigh Willis) and Jasper Jacks (Ingo Rademacher), which upsets Lucky, but Elizabeth miscarries. They marry, but get in a train accident on their way to their honeymoon, and Lucky almost dies. When Lucky has a serious back injury while trying to save Elizabeth from Manny Ruiz (Robert LaSardo), he becomes addicted to painkillers and has an affair with Maxie Jones (Kirsten Storms). Elizabeth walks in on them, and sleeps with Jason, becoming pregnant. When Lucky finds out, he assumes he's the father, and promises to get clean for their baby's sake. Elizabeth still divorces him, but Lucky tries to win her back after completing rehab. The two eventually remarry before Elizabeth gives birth to Jake Webber. When her relationship with Jason makes Lucky jealous, their marriage falls apart. Lucky finds out Jason is Jake's father, and he and Elizabeth file for divorce, but Lucky agrees to keep the secret about Jake's paternity to protect him. After Emily's death, Jason and Elizabeth begin a secret relationship, but Jason decides his life is too dangerous and ends things. Lucky and Elizabeth reconcile, but Elizabeth is also attracted to Nikolas. After she and Lucky get engaged, she starts having an affair with Nikolas. Lucky finds out, and ends his engagement with Elizabeth. On Valentine's Day, Lucky finds Elizabeth passed out from hypothermia, and they learn she is pregnant. Elizabeth has to be talked down off the roof by Lucky, and is sent to Shadybrook sanatorium. Helena switches the DNA test results to say Nikolas is the father, and he and Elizabeth start to mend their friendship in time to welcome Aiden Cassadine. Aiden is kidnapped by Franco (James Franco) before Lucky finds him.

Elizabeth later suspects that Lucky could be Aiden's father, and she runs a DNA test that confirms it. Just as she finds out, though, Jake runs out of the house and gets hit by a car. Jake dies in the hospital, and Elizabeth is heartbroken. She does not share the truth for months, coping with her grief and wanting to let Lucky be happy with his new wife, Siobhan McKenna (Erin Chambers). When Lucky burns down the Spencer house and accidentally injures Siobhan, Elizabeth tells him the truth to stop him from drinking. Though Nikolas does not believe Elizabeth, he returns Aiden to her and Lucky, then leaves town. When Siobhan dies, Elizabeth attempts to reconcile with Lucky, but he refuses and leaves town. Elizabeth accompanies Matt Hunter (Jason Cook) to a boat party, where Lisa Niles (Brianna Brown) throws her overboard, but she is saved by Dr. Ewen Keenan (Nathin Butler). Elizabeth briefly dates Ewen, but he kidnaps Elizabeth and reveals he's working for Jerry Jacks (Sebastian Roche). Ewen dies after being shot by Jason, who was rescuing Elizabeth.

Elizabeth attempts to reconcile with Jason, who is separated from his wife, Sam (Kelly Monaco), but Jason says they do not have a future together. Elizabeth interferes with Jason's efforts to find Sam's baby in an attempt to get him back, but later backs off and helps Jason and Sam reunite with their son, Danny. Jason is presumed dead soon after. Meanwhile, Elizabeth helps student nurse Sabrina Santiago (Teresa Castillo) plan the resurrection of the Nurses' Ball. When A.J. Quartermaine (Sean Kanan) turns up in town, Elizabeth is initially hesitant of his return from the dead for Emily's sake, but the two eventually form a relationship and start dating until A.J. starts drinking again, and Elizabeth broke up with him. When Ric came back to town, he tried to reconcile with Elizabeth. The two dated until Ric was presumed dead. Elizabeth started taking care of an amnesiac patient who had facial reconstruction surgery after a car accident. He eventually starts calling himself Jake after Elizabeth tells him about her son, and the two bonded. With no memories and no family looking for "Jake", he has nowhere to go when he is released from the hospital. Elizabeth invites him to stay at her house. They begin to grow closer until Ric returns, alive.

Elizabeth and Jake are still drawn to each other until Hayden Barnes (Rebecca Budig) comes to town, and claims "Jake" is her husband. Elizabeth walks away from "Jake" and resumes dating Ric. Hayden was actually hired by Ric to pretend to be "Jake's" wife. At the Nurses Ball, Carly outs Ric's lies, and Elizabeth breaks up with him. When Elizabeth realizes that she should be with "Jake", Nikolas reveals that "Jake" is actually Jason. At first, Elizabeth wants to tell the truth, but then decides to keep the secret and not tell "Jake" his real identity. She and "Jake" begin a relationship. Elizabeth and Jason's son, Jake, is found to be alive, they are reunited with their son with Lucky's help. Elizabeth feels torn about keeping the truth from Jason after they become engaged. On their wedding day, Jason learns his real identity. They don't get married, but decide to stay together and figure things out. Sam suspects that Elizabeth has known the truth about Jason's identity all along, and confronts her, then later shares her theory with Jason. When Jason confronts Elizabeth, she can no longer keep telling the lie and admits all to him. Unable to handle her deceit, Jason leaves Elizabeth, but they decide to parent Jake together. They become worried when Jake start exhibiting disturbing signs.

When Elizabeth's house starts getting vandalized, Jason investigates with Sam's help, who points out to Jason that the vandalism could've been done by someone inside the house. Jason becomes suspicious of Elizabeth, but she insists she's not responsible. However, Jason later realizes that Jake was responsible, hoping his parents would get back together. When they try to get Jake help, he gets hit by a car again and is hospitalized. The doctors, though, are able to save him, and he recovers from his injuries. While dealing with losing Jason and Jake's behavior, Elizabeth is surprisingly helped by a reformed Franco (Roger Howarth). He listens when Elizabeth is upset, and helps with Jake by providing art therapy. Elizabeth grows closer to Franco over time, and the two start dating. When Nikolas is presumed dead, Elizabeth blames his wife, Hayden, for driving Nikolas to desperate measures. She finds evidence to get Hayden arrested, but is pushed down the stairs during a hospital blackout soon after. Hayden is accused, but is later cleared when it's determined that Elizabeth was actually attacked by Paul Hornsby (Richard Burgi). Franco finds out that Hayden and Elizabeth are actually half-sisters, and reveals this to both girls. Though shocked, it does not thaw the animosity they both have for each other.

When Tom Baker (Don Harvey), the man who raped her 18 years before, is released from prison. Franco is desperate to keep Tom away from Elizabeth. Despite her fear of Tom, Elizabeth asks Franco to stay away from Tom for her sake. However, Tom is found dead, and Franco is accused of murdering him. Franco and Elizabeth succeed in getting him exonerated, and focus on their relationship. Meanwhile, Elizabeth grows closer to Hayden when she is diagnosed with a deadly disease, and Elizabeth helps take care of her. Hayden recovers, and when Elizabeth figures out Hayden's boyfriend, Dr. Hamilton Finn (Michael Easton), is an addict, she shares her own experiences with Lucky to help Hayden out.

== Character development ==
Elizabeth is introduced as the granddaughter of Steve Hardy, one of the original General Hospital core characters. She is the daughter of Jeff Webber and Carolyn (maiden name unknown), and the sister of Sarah Webber and half-sister of Steven Webber. At age fifteen, she arrives in Port Charles in August 1997 to stay with her grandmother, Audrey Hardy (Ames), the stepmother of Jeff. She follows her sister Sarah (then Sky), who had come to live with Audrey a few months prior. Elizabeth and Sarah had grown up in Boulder, Colorado and their parents left the country to work as doctors. Elizabeth is initially characterized as a rebellious teenager, who complains about having to be compared to her perfect sister. Herbst reflected in 1999 on her character's introduction: "In the past year she (was) a smart-ass child with no respect for anybody, who was out to get everyone. But that is because she was hurt since her parents pretty much abandoned her. So her frustration, anger and snottiness came from being misguided."

"I'm glad because it's a change, not because I now get to play a good girl. I enjoyed playing Elizabeth before. And I enjoy playing her now. She has evolved. She's changing. That in itself is exciting to play."

— Herbst in 1998, on the change in Elizabeth after her rape.

Elizabeth's character drastically changes after she is raped in February 1998. Following the assault, she becomes timid and scared, not wanting to leave the house. The teenager's innocence is lost. Lucky (then Jackson) is one of the only people she opens up to, and he helps her to slowly recover. Elizabeth goes through the stages of denial, anger, and eventual acceptance. Although she heals, her character is never the same. Herbst explained in 1999: "Ever since her trauma, Liz has matured more and my character has evolved as a result. She's not evil anymore and her growth since I've been on the show makes playing her today give me many challenges as an actor. (...) I think the writers have done a great job in making Liz not a victim but a fighter and showing that, while this was a terrible experience nobody should go through, she will get through this in time and go on with her life." Elizabeth grows in a positive way, and is a stronger person as a result. Soap Opera Weekly stated in November 1998: "After the initial shock of the attack wore off, and with support – mostly from Lucky – the best parts of the 'old' Liz resurfaced: her spirit, her determination, her innate smarts. But for the first time, Liz also showed herself as a person of untapped virtue and considerable substance."

== Reception and impact ==
=== General ===
In 2023, Charlie Mason from Soaps She Knows placed Elizabeth 18th on his ranked list of General Hospital's 40+ Greatest Characters of All Time, explaining, "Cut from the same cloth as grandmother Audrey Hardy, Liz is the inspirational heart and soul of Port Charles, a working wife and mom who strives to put her mistakes in rearview in order to pave the way for a brighter tomorrow." The following year, Mason included Elizabeth in his list of the best mothers in American soap operas, explaining, "Cameron, Jake and Aiden's mom would be the last person to say that she's perfect. And she is as flawed as any of us. Yet she instills in her boys a can-do spirit that we only wish rubbed off more on us".

=== Rape ===
The storyline of Elizabeth's kidnapping and rape was initially controversial, but the story of her recovery had a positive reception and received critical acclaim. Victims of abuse stated that the story helped them to heal, and wrote letters of praise to the show. Viewers related to Elizabeth; Herbst stated to Soap Opera Weekly in 1998:

I got so much mail, especially the first two weeks after Liz's rape aired. I got letters from people talking about how they were raped as a child, or that their mother was. A couple of them said that they hadn't talked about it with anybody, but that this storyline has helped them a lot. They thanked us for portraying it in a way that was very real to them. They've thought about it and realized that they're okay – the way Liz is okay. She may be hurt and damaged, but she's alive.

Herbst commented to Soap Opera News that she was glad to be helping others, and that the story helped her to be more aware herself as well as better understand the process of recovery. She was seen as a role model to female viewers. The storyline won General Hospital a SHINE Award (Sexual Health IN Entertainment) in 1998. Both Herbst and Jackson received praise for their portrayals throughout Elizabeth's recovery. Herbst received praise for scenes where Elizabeth confronted her suspected rapist and later on when she confronted her actual rapist. Soap Opera Magazine named Herbst Star of the Week in October 1998 when Elizabeth confronted her teacher, mistakenly believing him to be her rapist. Of the latter, Soap Opera News described: "We felt each transition in Liz's thoughts and feelings. We felt her fear. Then we felt her anger. Then we felt her take control over the situation. We experienced each experience with her. A television set no longer existed. The audience was in that photo studio, standing beside her, repulsed by this man."

=== Romance ===
Within Herbst's first year on the series, her character entered into a relationship with Lucky Spencer that was soon called a supercouple, compared to Lucky's legendary parents Luke and Laura. Lucky and Elizabeth's romantic relationship took place gradually during Elizabeth's recovery from being raped. Viewers responded positively to the slow pacing, and the couple was perceived as honest and innocent, something unique among soap opera couples at the time. The couple's first kiss happened months into the relationship, and was anticipated and celebrated by fans. The series used the popular teen characters in an attempt to reach young viewers with a social message through Lucky and Elizabeth's decision to abstain from sex. Executive producer at the time Wendy Riche explained her desire to show the decisions and pressures teenagers face, stating to Soap Opera Weekly: "We have the opportunity with these beloved characters who have struggled together and who have loved together and who are exploring sexuality together to reach an audience that doesn't really want to be preached to, but wants to feel it." In 2008, Lucky and Elizabeth were named No. 9 by Soaps In Depth of the Top 100 Greatest Couples of ABC Daytime.

Elizabeth's relationship with Jason Morgan intertwined with her relationship with Lucky, and although Elizabeth and Jason were never paired on-screen for a long period of time, the couple's fan base was very vocal. They were named by Zap2it to their Top 10 list of couples in 2007, 2008 and 2012. In 2008, they were named No. 12 by Soaps In Depth of the Top 100 Greatest Couples of ABC Daytime. The couple rivaled the supercouple pairing of Jason Morgan and Sam McCall, and in 2007 Zap2it stated, "without question Liz vs. Sam is the biggest rivalry in daytime." In 2010, Herbst commented on the fans' impact on the couple:

[The fans] are incredible, aren't they? No other word for them, and they are dedicated and they do not get discouraged, which is amazing. And it's been 7 or 8 years of them writing before Steve Burton (Jason) and I had a storyline together. (...) Without them, for sure, my storyline with Steve would have fallen flat long ago, but they really kept it going.

=== Awards ===
In 1999, Herbst won the Soap Opera Digest Award for Outstanding Younger Lead Actress, as well as an Emmy Award nomination for Outstanding Younger Actress. In 2000, Soap Opera Update named Herbst No. 6 on their list of Woman of 2000. Herbst was nominated for the Daytime Emmy Award for Outstanding Supporting Actress in a Drama Series in 2007 and 2012.

Elizabeth was named one of the "Hottest Nurses on TV" by Wet Paint, saying "Over the years, Elizabeth Webber (Rebecca Herbst) suffered the usual ups and downs that come with living in the General Hospital universe. Through it all she managed to hold onto her job (most of the time), and she never lost the sultry beauty that defines all the greatest soap stars."

== See also ==
- Lucky Spencer and Elizabeth Webber
- Jason Morgan and Elizabeth Webber
