= Jason Morgan and Sam McCall =

Jason and Sam
- General Hospital character
- Steve Burton and Kelly Monaco as Jason and Sam
- Duration: 2004–07; 2009–12; 2017–21
- Created by: Robert Guza, Jr. and Charles Pratt, Jr.
- Introduced by: Jill Farren Phelps
In-universe information
- Other names: JaSam
- Family: Cassadine; Jerome; Quartermaine
- Spouse: 2011–18
- Children: Danny Morgan

Jason Morgan and Sam McCall (commonly known by their portmanteau "JaSam") are fictional characters and a supercouple from the ABC daytime drama, General Hospital. They are known to be one of daytime's most popular supercouples. Jason is portrayed by actor Steve Burton; formerly, the role was played by Billy Miller. On December 1, 2017, Miller's character was revealed to be Jason's identical twin brother, Andrew Cain, conditioned to believe he was Jason and assume Jason's identity. Sam is portrayed by Kelly Monaco.

First meeting in 2003, their relationship was described as "an uneasy alliance that first blossomed into a friendship." A romantic relationship evolved from that friendship and the couple was involved for over a decade, with General Hospital writers scripting them as soulmates. Together, Jason and Sam have been titled "one of the most romantic duos in daytime," and their relationship has been described as "one of General Hospital's most intimate unions."

== Background ==
=== Casting ===
The role of Samantha McCall was originated by Daytime Emmy nominated actress Kelly Monaco on October 1, 2003. In 2006, Monaco was nominated for a Daytime Emmy Award for Outstanding Lead Actress in a Drama Series for her portrayal of Sam. In August 2009, fans were shocked by a casting call for the character. Despite rumors and speculation, Monaco's co-stars Steve Burton and Nancy Lee Grahn denied that she is departing from the show. Monaco herself has dispelled the rumors, stating there was "really no doubt" she would renew her contract. It was merely standard procedure for ABC to release the casting call since she and the network had not signed off on a new contract by a set deadline.

The role of Jason Morgan was played by Daytime Emmy award-winning actor Steve Burton from 1991 to 2012. Burton made his debut on December 19, 1991. After leaving the show in 2000 to pursue other interests, Burton returned to General Hospital full-time in May 2002. In 1998, Burton won a Daytime Emmy Award for Outstanding Supporting Actor in a Drama Series for his portrayal of Jason. In 2012, Burton received a Daytime Emmy pre-nomination for his role as Jason Morgan. On August 28, 2012, it was announced that Burton would be leaving the series. Burton confirmed in an interview with TV Guide's Michael Logan that he would exit the series and agreed to stay long enough for the producers to write his character out properly. In an interview with Access Hollywood.com, Monaco said that thinking about her co-star's exit is very hard, but she has an idea of how Jason will exit Port Charles and "it's likely to be pretty dramatic."

On September 2, 2014, executive producer Frank Valentini announced on Twitter that former All My Children and The Young and the Restless actor Billy Miller would join the cast as Jason. Miller made his debut in the role on October 1; coincidentally, this was also the same day Monaco made her debut as Sam 11 years prior. Miller is a three-time Daytime Emmy Award winner. He won for Outstanding Supporting Actor in a Drama Series in 2010 and 2013 for his role as Billy Abbott on The Young and the Restless. In 2014, he won Outstanding Lead Actor in a Drama Series for the same role.

=== Music ===
The couple's official song is "Just You and Me" by Rie Sinclair. The song was first played for the couple on March 30, 2005, when they shared a romantic rooftop dance in the rain. In 2006, by popular demand, the couple's song was featured on SOAPnet's, television talk show Soap Talk and performed by Jayson Belt in a mini concert for the studio audience. In 2009, after guest starring on General Hospital, American Idol contestant and tenth place finalist Chikezie Eze, covered the couple's theme song on his YouTube account. Also in 2009, a new instrumental version of "Just You and Me" was composed for the couple's 2009 reunion. "Just You and Me" was played for the couple when they finally wed in September 2011, but the couple shared their first dance as newlyweds to Ray LaMontagne's "Hold You In My Arms".

=== Creation and writing ===
"It just kind of happened. They didn’t really know where they were going when they put us together. They didn’t know what was going to happen...It just naturally happened. But we really got to work the moments. Bob [Guza, then head-writer] really let me pace it."

— Steve Burton on Jason and Sam's beginnings

Since their inception, Jason and Sam's intense and tumultuous relationship has captivated audiences for years. The couple's story began as a love-hate relationship, where the characters shared a mutual dislike of one another. Overtime, this relationship evolved into a friendship and later into love. At the core of their characters, Sam, the more outspoken of the two, has a tendency to ramble, while Jason is more of the stoic and silent type. However, the couple found that they shared other similar personality traits, such as their "daring, adrenaline junkie" attitudes, that bonded them together as kindred spirits. This relationship stuck out amongst Jason Morgan's others, because Sam was the first woman to completely accept him and not try to change him in any way.

"Sam is different in the way that she is the first character who isn’t stopping Jason from doing what he does. He hasn’t had that before. It’s a great element. The whole fight is not always, ‘Oh, your work is too dangerous. Your lifestyle is too dangerous,’ like his last few relationships. It’s a whole new level."

— Steve Burton, original portrayer of Jason Morgan

"Sam's relationship with Jason feels realistic. He may be guarded with his feelings but he does have them, and only lets the emotions flow with Sam. She's just tough enough to draw him out, and Monaco is delightfully playful with Steve Burton's usually baleful Jason. Sam inspires astonishing acts of tenderness, as when Jason signed "I love you," to her."

— Soap Opera Weekly, on Jason and Sam's relationship.

Sam and Jason's commonalities cause them to understand each other in a way no one else does, and this understanding was the basis of the connection between the characters. Burton explained the couple's connection to Soap Opera Weekly: During times of high pressure and stress, "the only person who can cool down Jason is, of course, Sam. "She’s always calm with him; she doesn’t try to force anything," Burton points out. "She always knows what to do: when to push, and when to back off. She really understands Jason." Monaco further commented on the couple's relationship to Soaps In Depth:

"Sam will always love Jason. He was her little safe haven. She was brutally honest with him, so you'd get nothing but raw emotion. They had each other's backs and trusted each other's instincts."

— Kelly Monaco, portrayer of Sam McCall

Burton and Monaco, the acting duo that originally brought this pairing to life, have often commented on how their two characters weren't originally supposed to be together, but the fan reaction and their on-screen chemistry caused the General Hospital writers to move them in a new direction. Their love story was allowed to evolve naturally and organically. The couple started out as an "unlikely love story", but over time turned into much more. They spent many years together and in that time, overcame several obstacles that tried to keep them apart. The couple shared many loving, joyful, and tender moments and have also prevailed over periods of turmoil, heartache and separation. During the characters' separation in 2008, Monaco stated to Soap Opera Digest, "The love of Sam's life will always be Jason."

"I think why there was a success in this relationship was that it was never meant to be a relationship and that’s what was cool about it. It was almost like The Bodyguard. I was here to protect this girl and make sure everything was okay and that she stayed healthy and stayed safe. And then we became friends and then it went into a romance. That was kind of the first time, I think, I ever had a relationship on the show where we were just kind of friends. There was no motive of us even being together until they saw us starting to work together, like, “Wait a minute. There’s something here. Okay. Let’s go this way.” And that’s what we did."

— Steve Burton discusses Sam and Jason's romance with Soap Opera Digest

"Their no-nonsense approach to love and taste for adventure tested their relationship several times after they first met in 2003 (as did their intermittent relationship with other people), but "JaSam’s" Bonnie and Clyde romance never lacked for excitement or passion. They triumphed over multiple run-ins with the law, nasty break ups and Franco’s torture to wed in 2011, but 2012 proved to be a real killer: after reuniting in the wake of a long rough patch that included paternity test tampering and the presumed death of their newborn son, Daniel, Jason was shot presumably fatally, by Faison."

— Soap Opera Digest, on Jason and Sam's history.

Former General Hospital head-writer, Ron Carlivati noted that "Jason and Sam are an incredibly popular couple [...] a great couple who are very strong and very solid in a lot of ways. Former General Hospital head-writer Garin Wolf described Jason and Sam as an "unconventional yet strong and unique couple." Jason and Sam's shared affinity for danger and adrenaline have led them to be described as having a Bonnie and Clyde type of relationship. Several of their storylines have revolved around adventure with an "us against the world" theme present. The theme has been in place since the couple's first meeting in the Port Charles Police Department, where they were both arrested for aiding and abetting Sonny Corinthos. They have been on the run from law enforcement more than once; most notably in early 2005 when Sam was framed for kidnapping and Jason was the only one who believed her innocence, in the summer of 2005 when they went on the run with Sonny's oldest son Michael Corinthos (then Dylan Cash) to protect him from murder charges and again the fall of 2006 when Sam was being framed for murder. The couple was referred to as a real live "Bonnie and Clyde" onscreen on July 31, 2009, when they were arrested while trying to track down runaways Michael and Kristina. The theme is further reinforced by the fact that the couple always turn to each other when dealing with high pressure situations, even during times of discord between them. They also have a similar comfort with living outside of the law and making their own rules. Former General Hospital head-writer Robert Guza, Jr. describes Sam as "the last and only woman able to go toe to toe with Jason in action mode."

"One of the coolest things about Jason and Sam is that they are both fearless heroes - to Port Charles and each other. Theirs has never been a love story about a hunk rescuing a damsel in distress. Sam's as likely to save Jason as he is to save her."

— Soaps In Depth describes Jason and Sam's relationship

== Storyline ==
=== 2003–05 ===
Jason and Sam first met when they were both arrested for aiding and abetting Sonny Corinthos (Maurice Benard). The two have often been caught in situations where they were in trouble with the law. The two started to interact more after Sam got involved with a married Sonny, and Jason tried to pay her off so that Sonny would go back to his wife, Carly (then Tamara Braun). Sam refused, and the two were constantly fighting, even after Jason was assigned as Sam's bodyguard to protect her from Sonny's enemies. When Sam found out that she was pregnant with Sonny's child, Jason asks Sam to say he's the baby's father, and let Sonny and Carly stay together for the sake of their sons, Michael (then Dylan Cash) and Morgan. Sam agrees to Jason's request and they almost marry, but Sam backs out because they are not in love and she still has feelings for Sonny.

Jason and Sam began to bond and care for each other during her pregnancy, and became friends. Jason protected Sam from her abusive ex-boyfriend and took care of her mentally handicapped brother, Danny McCall (David Greenman). When Jason's grandmother died, Sam decided to name her daughter Lila Morgan in honor of Jason's late grandmother Lila Morgan Quartermaine (Anna Lee). Tragically, Sam's daughter was stillborn. Jason and Sam grieve together, eventually falling in love. Though Jason turns down pursuing a relationship and Sam moves out, the two get back together when they realize they do not want to be without each other. Sam and Jason get engaged in January 2005. They plan to adopt baby Hope, until the mother decides to take her baby back. Jason convinces Sam to give Hope up to avoid a court battle.

Sam is hurt and angry at this decision and leaves Jason briefly, but they reunite after Sam is accused of kidnapping. Jason is the only one to believe Sam's innocence, and was able to prove it. When things cooled down, Jason and Sam went on a romantic vacation, but they were kidnapped by Allegra Montenegro (Meg Bennett), who needed Sam to impersonate her daughter Alicia, and marry Andrew Olsen. Sam reluctantly agreed to save Jason and herself. When Andrew was killed, Sam was arrested for Andrew's murder. Allegra helped Jason break Sam out of jail, get the real Alicia arrested, and they returned to Port Charles.

After returning, Jason began to suffer from life-threatening headaches, seizures and amnesia. Sam is there for Jason when he eventually loses his memory as a result of his illness. Sam convinces Jason to undergo treatment with the help Dr. Robin Scorpio (Kimberly McCullough). He and Sam fall in love all over again and he proposes to her a second time before he begins his treatment. After the treatment, Jason gets his memory back and remembers his life with Sam, but the procedure causes a brain aneurysm. Jason initially refuses to have surgery to repair the damage, and he and Sam move to Hawaii to live out his last days peacefully. However, Jason realizes that he wants to live to be with Sam, and returns to Port Charles to have the surgery, which ended up saving his life.

=== 2006–08 ===
In 2006, during the encephalitis plague, Sam became deathly sick. Jason and Carly found the antidote, and brought it to General Hospital. Unfortunately, they were not in time to save Danny. Sam found out afterwards she was adopted, and that her birth mother was Alexis Davis (Nancy Lee Grahn). When Sam is shot by one of Jason's enemies, he tells Alexis that Sam is her daughter. Alexis pressures Jason into breaking up with Sam for her own good. Though Jason walks away, Sam continually tries to win him back, but all her efforts fail. Infuriated and hurt, Sam gets drunk and sleeps with Ric Lansing (Rick Hearst), Alexis' husband. Unfortunately, Alexis and Jason, having both returned in an attempt to apologize and patch things up with Sam, witness this.

Heartbroken and angry, Jason gets drunk and sleeps with Elizabeth Spencer (Rebecca Herbst). Elizabeth becomes pregnant, and the baby was initially believed to be the child of her husband, Lucky (then Greg Vaughan). Sam and Jason are able to reconcile and work through their issues. When Sam is framed by Ric, she and Jason go on the run and clear Sam's name, with the help of Damian Spinelli (Bradford Anderson). Jason learns that he is the father of Elizabeth's son, Jake Spencer, but they decide not to tell Sam or Lucky, who still thinks the baby is his. But Sam learns about Jake's paternity and becomes hurt, angry and jealous. Sam witnesses Jake being kidnapped and does not intervene; Jason later rescues Jake from his kidnapper, who tells him that Sam saw what happened. Sam visits Jason in prison and breaks up with him, citing his lies and emotional unfaithfulness as her reasons, which began a 2-year breakup. When Jason starts a relationship with Elizabeth, Sam, devastated and angry, hires actors to scare Elizabeth and her sons at gunpoint to remind her that Jason's enemies are everywhere. However, Jason traces the goons back to Sam; confronting her in her own home, Jason openly threatens to kill Sam if she tries anything against Elizabeth's family again. Despite the severity of Sam's actions, the break up was received with mixed reviews. Monaco explains to Soap Opera Digest in a 2008 interview, "I feel Sam and Jason was so abruptly ended without any explanation, really, as to the coldness that was so one-sided [on Jason's part]. Of course, Jake came into play, but I felt like Jason and Sam were always strong enough to overcome. Who knows [what will happen] down the line?"

"What we’ve always liked about Sam is that she has never wanted to change who Jason is. He is the way he is and she loves him for who he is. That’s what, as writers, we kept coming back to. We didn’t have that kind of relationship on the show, which is why [I resurrected it]."

— Former General Hospital head-writer Robert Guza Jr., on a Jason and Sam reunion.

In Fall 2008, former ABC Daytime president, Brian Frons began hinting that more Sam and Jason interaction would occur in the future, because the audience wanted to see more of that. In late 2008, months after Jason ended his 1-year romantic relationship with Elizabeth, he and Sam began to soften to one another. When Jake is kidnapped by the Russian mob, Sam helps Jason track him down and she rescues him from a burning building minutes before it explodes. Later on, when Sam herself is taken by the Russian syndicate, Jason rescues her with Spinelli's help. They team up again when a man named Joe walked into General Hospital with a bomb strapped to his chest, and demanded that his pregnant wife get treatment after previously being turned away. During the lockdown, Elizabeth ran into the hospital with Jake after being in a house fire. Joe initially refused to let any of the doctors help Elizabeth and Jake, but Sam managed to convince Joe to allow Jake treatment. Soon after, Jason arrived at GH, and he and Sam fell back into their old pattern and worked together to stop Joe. Jason and Sam then went their separate ways for a few months, but they both maintained a mutual friend in Spinelli and this sometimes caused them to cross paths.

=== 2009–13 ===
In early 2009, Sam and Jason are inside General Hospital when it is locked down again due to an outbreak of a bio toxin. The two teamed up to rescue Spinelli when the hospital starts to burn down. Later in the year, Sam helps Jason and Spinelli after they are entrapped by the FBI. Jason, in turn, helps Sam and Spinelli set up a private investigation firm. When Kristina and Michael run away to Mexico, Sam and Jason go after them. Sam is kidnapped by Jerry Jacks (Sebastian Roché), who is trying to lure Jason into a trap. Jason ends up shot by Jerry, who leaves him to die. Sam escapes and rescues Jason. Jason starts hallucinating that he is in Hawaii with Sam. They grow closer as Sam nurses him back to health and end up making love, but decide not to talk about it. They find the teens and return to Port Charles. After they return, Jason and Sam remain drawn to each other and soon start dating again.

While covering up Michael killing Claudia Zacchara (Sarah Joy Brown), Sam and Jason grow closer, admitting their love for each other and apologizing for the past. When Jason is stalked by crazed artist Franco (James Franco), Sam is targeted. Jason rescues Sam, saying he'd always choose to save her when she's in trouble. Sonny was accused and put on trial for the Claudia's murder, but Michael confessed was sentenced to prison. Jason made a deal and sent himself to prison to protect Michael. While upset, Sam supported his decision. Before Jason turned himself in, they go away together and spend a few days at a cabin. Sam remained supportive and visited him regularly in prison. Jason and Michael are later permanently released from prison, and Jason reunites with Sam as lovers and renewed their romance, for the first time in 2 years. When Sonny's old flame Brenda Barrett (Vanessa Marcil Giovinazzo) was targeted by the Balkan, Jason acted as her bodyguard and she moved in with him. Sam was initially jealous of Brenda, but Jason assured her that he loved her. Determined to get Brenda out of the penthouse quickly, Sam and Jason began searching for the Balkan.

On Sonny and Brenda's wedding day, Sam got caught in an explosion meant for Brenda. Jason stayed by Sam's side when she was dealing with temporary hearing loss, even communicating in sign language to express his love. Jason decides to propose to Sam soon afterwards during a romantic dinner on the roof, and Sam accepts. Overwhelmed by the wedding planning, the two of them decide to drive off on Jason's motorcycle. They end up at a Chinese restaurant, where the owner happens to be an ordained minister. Jason and Sam get married in the restaurant's garden. They leave for their honeymoon to Hawaii, where Franco drugs them both, locks Jason in a room, and makes him watch while he takes Sam to the bedroom and places her in bed, before turning off the camera. When Jason comes back to Sam, both of them come to believe Franco raped Sam.

The two return to Port Charles. Soon after, Sam finds out she's pregnant. She and Jason have a paternity test done, which establishes Jason as the father. However, Sam finds out that Franco is Jason's twin brother. Sam has another paternity test run, and is devastated when it says that Franco is the father of her baby. She tells Jason, and the two of them start to drift apart trying to deal this news. While they're separated, Sam gives birth to a baby boy during a rainstorm. Her son is switched at birth with Victor Lord III, who was stillborn, by Heather Webber (Robin Mattson) and Todd Manning (Roger Howarth). Jason finds them, and the two mourn when they believe that the baby died. It's revealed that Jason truly is the father of Sam's son because Heather switched the paternity test. Their son is given to Téa Delgado (Florencia Lozano), Victor's mother, who believes he's her son. Though Jason wants to make things right with Sam, she blames him for the death of her son. The two separate, and file for divorce. During the poisoning of the Port Charles water supply, Sam and Jason are admitted to the hospital in what seems to be the last hours of their life. Sam shares with Jason a dream she had where her son was still alive. Afterwards, Jason gets information that starts to make him suspect the baby that died wasn't Sam's.

Jason eventually figures out that Sam's son was switched with Téa's son. By the time they find out, though, Heather has kidnapped the baby for herself. Jason and Sam team up, and are able to rescue the baby from Heather. They're reunited with their son, whom they name Daniel Edward Morgan. The two reconcile, finally getting the chance to raise the family they always wanted. Sadly, the night they come home, Jason is shot by Cesar Faison (Anders Hove), and presumed dead when his body isn't found. Sam later found out that Jason is Danny's biological father. Though Sam was initially in denial about Jason's death, she later accepted that Jason was never coming home.

=== 2014–16 ===
Jason is alive, and held captive by Victor Cassadine (Thaao Penghlis). Victor forces Robin to revive Jason, but the two escape Victor's clutches and come back to Port Charles. Jason is hit by a car, though, and has to undergo a complete facial reconstruction. Jason's vitals spike while Sam is holding his hand, even though he is under heavy sedation. Jason (Billy Miller) awakens with amnesia, and starts going by "Jake". He bonds with both Sam and Danny, who feel drawn to him while he's unconscious. Though he wakes up with no memory, he's under Helena Cassadine's (Constance Towers) mind control, and holds Sam hostage while freeing a prisoner. Sam suspects Jake, but he denies the accusation. Helena orders him to kill Sam, but "Jake's" unable to fulfill this order. When "Jake" is eventually arrested, Sam helps him break Helena's mind control, and remember what he had done. "Jake" asks Sam for help to figure out who he is. "Jake" has obscure dreams about his past, specifically of Sam and Danny. He starts a relationship with Elizabeth, while Sam dates Patrick Drake (Jason Thompson). When Hayden Barnes (Rebecca Budig), who knew his true identity, is shot, Sam and Jake stop their investigation. On their wedding anniversary, Sam and "Jake" unknowingly renew their vows.

Jason and Sam (Miller and Monaco, pictured) in 2016.

With Spinelli and Carly's help, "Jake's" true identity is uncovered the day he is supposed to marry Elizabeth. Jason and Sam's respective relationships eventually end, and they reconnect. When Jason gets into a fight with Nikolas Cassadine (Tyler Christopher), Sam helps prove Jason's innocence by proving Nikolas started the fight. Jason recovers more memories of his life hanging out with Sam, though she puts no pressure on him to remember. Jason saves Sam's life when she is injured trying to help Jason and Elizabeth's son, Jake. Despite not recovering his memories, Jason realizes how much Sam means to him, and the two tentatively start a relationship. They divorce so they can start fresh without the pressure of the past.

After discovering that Hayden was shot on Nikolas' orders, Sam and Jason confront Nikolas. The intense confrontation later culminates in Jason and Sam making love for the first time in four years, in a scene that was described as racy, intimate and passionate. Jason recovers his memories after getting into an accident, where he hallucinates seeing Sam and telling her he loves her. He later reunites with Sam, re-affirming his love for her. Jason and Sam end up on the run, trying to clear Jason's name in Nikolas' disappearance. They find Nikolas after he faked his own death, finding enough proof to get Jason cleared of all charges. After returning, Sam finds out that she is pregnant, and is thrilled until Jason is diagnosed with malaria, and Sam finds out her pregnancy is at risk if she's infected, as well. Though she tries to keep it from him, Jason realizes that Sam is keeping a secret. Sam relents, and shares the news of her pregnancy. Jason is thrilled, and proposes to Sam, who happily accepts. Sam later finds out she and the baby are perfectly healthy. Jason and Sam remarry at Greystone Manor, surrounded by their closest friends and family.

Jason and Sam investigate when Morgan (Bryan Craig) is killed in a car bombing. The bomb was targeting Julian Jerome (William deVry), Sonny's rival, but Jason finds out Sonny was not responsible. Jason works with Curtis Ashford (Donnell Turner) to investigate so that Sam can rest during her pregnancy. Julian, Sam's father, tries to scare Jason off, but he refuses, though he asks Sam and Danny to go to a safe house. Sam refuses because she does not want to be separated from Jason.

=== 2017–21 ===
Jason and Curtis figure out that Olivia St. John (Tonja Walker), Julian's sister, is responsible for Morgan's death. Meanwhile, Olivia kidnaps Sam to threaten Julian, but Sam tries to escape. Unfortunately, in the ensuing struggle, Sam gets pushed off a bridge by Olivia into a ravine. Jason tries to track down Sam after realizing she's missing, but is unable to see her in the dark. Just as Jason gives up, a beam of moonlight helps him find Sam after the moon comes out. Jason gets to Sam, who is already in labor, and ends up having to deliver their baby girl. He gets them to the hospital, where Sam ends up in a coma after surgery. Jason begs her to wake up, saying he can't go on without her. Alexis brings their newborn daughter to visit Sam. When Jason lays the baby on Sam's chest, Sam wakes up and recovers. She and Jason name their daughter Emily Scout Morgan.

In November 2017, while in an exclusive Russian clinic, Ava Jerome (Maura West) is seeking help for her severe facial burns. While there she meets Patient 6, who bears a striking resemblance to Jason Morgan's original face. Ava is unaware of this but befriends the seemingly catatonic Patient 6 eventually helping him escape once he is fully awake. With the help of Dr. Griffin Munro (Matt Cohen) he escapes and stowed away on a cargo boat headed for New York. He makes it to Port Charles and enters his old Penthouse. It's here that he almost runs into Sam and Jason learning that they have married. Once he is finally revealed to everyone Sonny and Carly are certain that he is their Jason and the man that Sam is married to is the impostor. Through Franco, they learn that Jason had an identical twin Drew (Andrew) who was separated from him at birth and raised by Betsy Frank until the age of 4 at which time he was sent away for adoption. DNA tests prove that the two men have identical DNA. Dr. Andre Maddox (Anthony Montgomery) revealed that both men were kidnapped in 2012 to perform a Brain Mapping procedure which implanted Jason Morgan's memories into his brother, Drew Cain - Navy Seal, and stripped Drew of his memories. Drew is reluctant to give up his identity as Jason Morgan as his are the only memories he had, but eventually with all of the mounting evidence against him he accepted that his memories did not belong to him but his brother Jason.

On December 29, 2017, Jason and Sam kiss on New Year's Eve, but at the start of 2018, she tells Jason that she loves Drew. In mid-January, Sam and Jason were legally divorced and she remarries Drew a short time later. Spinelli attempts to encourage Jason to win Sam back and stop her wedding to Drew, but it was too late. In early March 2018, an earthquake shakes Port Charles. In the aftermath of the earthquake, Jason saves Sam's life. The intensity of the ordeal causes Sam to admit that she still loves Jason. After coming clean with Drew regarding her feelings for Jason, they end their marriage. Sam takes some time to herself to re-assess her feelings. Months later, she begins a romantic relationship with Jason again after saving him when he fell in the catacombs and had to swim in freezing water to safety. He became unconscious in the water and Sam dived in and rescued him. Over the following months, they work to free Kristina from dangerous cult leader David Henry Archer (Coby Ryan McLaughlin) aka Shiloh. Sam is sent to prison after killing Shiloh in self-defense. She was later released on parole, but her parole terms dictated that she must stay away from any convicted felons, including Jason. This caused another unofficial separation from Jason, but they continued to meet in secret.

In November 2020, Jason and Danny are almost killed in an explosion at The Floating Rib, orchestrated by Cyrus Renault (Jeff Kober). The experience terrifies Sam and she is unable to cope. She also begins to see the negative effect Jason's frequent and long absences are having on the kids. She ultimately decides she cannot continue to expose their children to danger and she and Jason painfully agree to end their relationship. Of the couple's separation, General Hospital Co-Head Writer Chris Van Etten said, "Sam and Jason will always love one another, but they are committed to this course of action." He continues, "Under ideal circumstances, there would be no question as to whether or not they would spend the rest of their lives together. But right now, Sam believes she is making the right decision for her family, and Jason agrees. They’ll always be in each other’s lives, but Jason believes staying away is the right thing to do for now."

In 2024, Sam was murdered by Cyrus after donating part of her liver to Lulu Spencer. Cyrus injected Sam with a lethal dose of digitalis. Jason sat by Sam's bedside, remembering the course of their relationship, and promised to hold onto every last one of the memories. Jason found out in Sam's will, a will drafted when she believed Jason was dead, that she had given legal guardianship of Danny to Drew, so that he and Scout could stay together, but Jason didn't trust Drew with his son. Realizing how much the kids needed each other, Jason decided to move into the Quartermaine mansion with Danny and Scout so they could stay together and honor Sam's wishes.

== Recurring themes and symbols ==
=== Stars ===
A recurring theme that has occurred several times in Jason and Sam's romance is the appearance of stars. The theme of the stars first appeared on November 19, 2004 after Sam's daughter was stillborn. Jason and Sam were grieving for her and started talking about heaven. Jason said that when he is near the ocean, he feels like he is a part of something "bigger than himself." Sam replied that for her it was the stars.

Sam: For me it's the stars. Just looking up in the sky and feeling just small and important at the same time, scared, yet happy to be a part of it. Do you think there are stars in heaven?
Jason: I think there's everything you'd want for the baby -- love, you know, security, happiness, and stars.

— Jason and Sam first discuss the stars

Sam later went outside to gaze at the stars and feel closer to her baby. However she wasn't completely healed and passed out on the roof. She was found by Alexis, who took her back inside. Stars next appeared on April 20, 2005. Sam and Jason were in Italy looking for Michael and stopped to gaze at a shooting star. Jason promised Sam that he would bring her back to Italy to spend time together. The star gazing later inspired Jason to buy Sam a star shaped necklace, which became a tangible item of the theme of stars in their relationship. Jason later gifted Sam with the star necklace on May 11, 2005 and Sam wore the necklace daily.

On July 7, 2006, during Jason and Sam's first break up, Jason refused to resume a relationship with Sam for her own safety. After a fight at the hospital she ripped off the star necklace and dropped it in a janitor's bucket, symbolizing the brokenness of their relationship at the time. When Jason and Sam reunited later that year on December 26, 2006, Jason gifted Sam with a new star necklace for Christmas. On February 1, 2007 during the Metro Court Hostage crisis, the star necklace was ripped from Sam's neck by one of the gunman. It was lost until Alexis recovered it from one of the police department's evidence boxes. After Jason and Sam broke up for the second time and Sam went to Jason's penthouse to pick up the rest of her belongings, she left the newly recovered star necklace with him because she didn't want any reminders of "what could have been."

The theme of stars re-emerged when Jason and Sam went star gazing after their wedding reception on September 28, 2011. Later, after Franco's attack on the couple during their honeymoon, Jason held Sam as they gazed at the stars because they made her feel safe. Jason and Sam star-gazed several times throughout the year. Stars emerged again on February 8, 2012, after Sam and Jason learned that they were going to be parents. Jason took Sam back to the honeymoon cabin he had built for them and they gazed at stars. They also promised each other that they would teach their child all about the constellations.

A replica of Sam's star necklace has been made available for fans to purchase and was described as a fan favorite design. Sam's wedding ring, which formerly belonged to Jason's grandmother, Lila Quartermaine (Anna Lee), also became a best-selling jewelry item and was brought back for consumer purchase due to popular demand.

The star necklace re-emerged in 2015, when Kristina Davis (Lexi Ainsworth) was looking through the storage cage at Jason's penthouse and came across the necklace after 8 years. She returns it to Sam, who wears the necklace and sparks a memory in an amnesiac Jason.

=== Dragon and Phoenix ===
The Chinese mythological symbols of the Dragon and the Phoenix have been used to represent Jason and Sam individually as well as their union as a married couple. Throughout their relationship Jason and Sam have had an affinity for Chinese food. When they went to escape the stress of their wedding, they ended up in the Asian Quarter of town at a little Chinese restaurant. The couple's wedding was infused with a lot of Chinese tradition. During their wedding ceremony in the garden, Jason stood under the symbol of the Dragon and Sam stood under the symbol of the Phoenix.

In Chinese mythology, the Phoenix symbolizes luck, success, beauty and prosperity. The Phoenix was considered the goddess of all winged creatures and was often the symbol of the Empress. The Dragon symbolizes protection, strength, wealth, good fortune and vigilance. It is regarded as the ultimate being amongst all creatures and was often the symbol of the Emperor. Together, the dragon and the phoenix represent the ultimate union of yin and yang. They represent wedded bliss, harmony, happiness in marriage, people who are "meant to be," success and prosperity, as well as many offspring, and the beginning of a dynastic family.

For Christmas on December 23, 2011, Jason and Sam exchanged dragon and phoenix figurines. The couple's son, Daniel, was born in the year of the dragon and their daughter, Emily, was born in the year of the phoenix (fire rooster). During their wedding ceremony the minister, Robert Yi recited these words on the dragon and the phoenix:

Jason, you stand beneath the symbol of the dragon. Sam, you stand beneath the symbol of the phoenix. For the union between a bride and a groom is the union between phoenix and the dragon. The dragon, the symbol of strength, can scare off evil spirits, protect the innocent, bless those around him with safety, and bring wealth to those who hold his emblem. The phoenix, goddess of all winged creatures, harvests luck, success, and prosperity. She can turn bad luck into good. Together, the phoenix and the dragon are the ultimate sign of yin and yang. Male, female. Strength and beauty. Alone, they bring happiness, but together, they bring double happiness.

— Robert Yi marries Jason and Sam

== Reception and impact ==
"Jason and Sam’s relationship began as a practical solution to a thorny problem, but their portrayers have created a love story that is richer than any cute, hearts-and-flowers romance. This couple’s loss was our bittersweet gain."

— Soap Opera Digest on Sam and Jason after the loss of her daughter.

The pairing of Jason and Sam has been a fan favorite couple for years, praised for their great onscreen chemistry. Their slow build romance was also praised for evolving naturally and realistically. Even before the rise of social media, Monaco recounts how they knew their pairing was turning into something special. “Before Twitter, we did these great events down in Disney and we would have 50,000 of the most amazing fans there. We were able to hear a lot of feedback. And generally really positive feedback.” In 2008 during the couple's separation there was a notable outcry for their reunion. Soap Opera Digest stated that their mailbag was being dominated by "very vocal" General Hospital fans who wanted to see Jason and Sam reunited. In November 2008 they were included on ABC Soaps In Depth 100 greatest couples of ABC Daytime. In February 2009 the couple was voted one of the favorite General Hospital supercouples of all time by participants in a SheKnows Entertainment online survey. In 2009, the couple was named one of the best soap opera couples of the decade. Also in 2009, the couple's reunion was named one of the Top Nine General Hospital Moments of 2009, in conjunction with the promotion of the Academy Award nominated, musical-romantic film Nine.

In 2010, the couple was included in an ABC daytime special three-hour program featuring classic couples. A scene from couple's post-prison 2010 reunion appeared on the ABC primetime drama Detroit 1-8-7. Also in 2010, the couple was featured in a Soap Opera Digest article on how soaps were bringing love in the afternoon back to the screen. Academy award nominated actor James Franco was involved in the couple's wedding. When their wedding date was announced on the official General Hospital Facebook, a social network created for fan feedback, the announcement was met with tremendous fan satisfaction and support. The anticipation of the fictional couple's wedding also spanned outside of the soap opera medium when they were featured in Cosmopolitan magazine and The Celebrity Bride Guide, which features articles on prominent celebrities and public figures.

Steve Burton (Jason) and Kelly Monaco (Sam) could teach a course in chemistry.

— Rosemary A. Rossi, Soaps In Depth

During the week of the couple's wedding and reception festivities, according to TV by the Numbers, General Hospital's ratings hit a two-month high in their coveted 'Women 18-49' demo. General Hospital was also the most watched show in ABC Daytime for that week, surpassing other shows such as The View, and they ranked second behind The Young and the Restless in the top five daytime programs for Women 18-49. The projected day of their wedding also saw an increase of 303,000 viewers from previous days that week. The couple has also gained some famous and notable fans; in 2012 Jason and Sam were mentioned in a USA Today interview as being the favorite daytime pairing of New York Times best selling author and romance novelist Carly Phillips. Phillips, as a lifelong fan of soap operas stated that Sam and Jason were the couple that she, as a romance writer admired. Daytime Award-winning actress Robin Strasser, who played the iconic Dorian Lord on One Life to Live from 1979 to 2013, is another fan of the pairing and tweeted that Steve and Kelly partnered as few soap greats ever did. Reigning WWE Divas Champion, AJ Lee also took to Twitter to show her support for the couple. She tweeted about her displeasure at their most recent separation and shared her hopes of a reunion for the pair. American sports television personality, radio host and journalist, Stephen A. Smith, who is a longtime fan of the soap, shared that he is also a fan of the pair.

"Was anything on TV this week more heartbreaking than General Hospital‘s Sam realizing her emotional reunion with a presumed-dead Jason was merely a daydream? What’s more, is anyone else peeved at the producers for delivering such a devastating fakeout? (Yes, we here at TVLine love us some JaSam.)"

— Team TVLine in 2012 comments on the couple's last scenes together

General Hospital ratings soared to a 19-month high, during the week of October 15–19, 2012, and the show received its highest ratings since executive producer Frank Valentini and head-writer Ron Carlivati assumed their positions. In total viewers, the show had its highest numbers since February 2011 at 3 million viewers. The major events of that week - the culmination of the baby switch storyline involving the couple's son Daniel, and the reunion of Jason and Sam with Daniel, were among those credited with this large increase in ratings. In the summer of 2012, Jason and Sam won the Gold for General Hospital in Zap2it's Summer Soap Couple Olympics. In November 2012, Jason and Sam were praised on TVLine's weekly column on major happenings in primarily primetime television. In early 2013, thousands of fans voted to see an episode featuring Jason and Sam in SOAPnet's Valentine's Day Supercouple Marathon. Over 36,000 votes were cast. Jason and Sam won first place and a spot in a marathon. They were featured alongside other popular General Hospital supercouples. Also in 2013, Jason and Sam were named one of General Hospital's great supercouples of the 2000s in People magazine's tribute to General Hospital's 50th anniversary.

The depth of Steve Burton and Kelly Monaco's on-screen connection is absolutely astounding. Not only can they simultaneously convey fear and hope, they can just look at each other and make the audience believe they're peeking in on a private moment between people in love.

— Soaps In Depth

In February 2014, Jason and Sam were the only daytime soap opera couple nominated in the People's Choice Awards Valentine's Day poll, for most romantic TV couple of the 2000s. Jason and Sam placed second in the competition. Regarding Sam and Jason's spot as the only daytime couple in the competition, People's Choice editorial director Nuzhat Naoreen said, "We asked the fans to nominate their all-time favorite romantic TV couples and GH's Jason and Sam received a flood of submissions [...] they were the only soap couple that garnered enough write-ins to land a spot among the four couples featured in the All Time Most Romantic TV Couple poll. Fans wrote in to say that Jason and Sam had all the qualities that make a great couple and that the pairing made them fall in love with [the soap]."

The recast of Jason, with Daytime alum Billy Miller, brought about much speculation on how Jason's re-introduction would change the Port Charles canvas. Zap2it posed the question of who Jason should reconnect with romantically upon his arrival—his wife Sam or former love Elizabeth Webber. Over 50% of readers responded that Jason should reconnect with Sam. Miller and Monaco's Jason and Sam shared their first scenes, since Jason's return, on October 2. Despite Jason being unconscious, the scenes were described as "breathtaking." Jennifer Snyder of TV Source Magazine remarked that she could "easily see Miller and Monaco sparking chemistry." A re-post of the scenes on General Hospital's Facebook account received over 95,000 likes from viewers, and Monaco received favorable reviews for her performance in the scenes.

Following more recent scenes between Miller and Monaco, Coryon Gray of TV Source Magazine, described the duo as having "a huge heaping amount of chemistry ... that shoots right off the meters." Dorathy Gass of Fame10 Entertainment stated that Miller added a "unique twist" to the chemistry the couple shares and commented that Miller and Monaco would have no problem reigniting the passion that Jason and Sam share. Hope Campbell of Soap Shows noted how difficult it can be to recast one-half of a supercouple, but affirmed that Miller and Monaco have portrayed just as much chemistry as Burton and Monaco. Campbell also applauded Miller, Monaco and the writers for their creation of "a new "Jasam" mixed in with the old and the continuation of an epic soap opera love story."

Entertainment Weekly called Miller and Monaco's chemistry "quite undeniable," while General Hospital described their love story as "one for the books." In 2015, Jason and Sam were named the second greatest General Hospital couple of all time by Fame10 Entertainment. In 2016, "JaSam" placed as runner up for Best Fandom in E! Online's annual TV Scoop Awards, beating out 30 other popular primetime couples. Jason and Sam were the only daytime couple with enough nominations to earn a spot in the competition. In 2018, ABC.com introduced "The Best of Jason and Sam Collection" on their website, giving fans access to 15 free episodes highlighting the most unforgettable moments from the last 15 years of "JaSam's" love story. In 2020, Sam and Jason were ranked #3 in Soaps In Depth's Top 10 Couples of All Time.

Production of General Hospital was suspended in March 2020 as a direct result of the COVID-19 pandemic in the United States. General Hospital aired original episodes through the end of May 21, 2020. After the original episodes ran out, General Hospital aired vintage episode repeats that included weeks dedicated to fan favorite supercouples: Luke and Laura, Sonny and Carly and Jason and Sam. The best of Jason and Sam ran from June 22–26, 2020.

== See also ==
- Supercouple
- List of supercouples
