= Jason Morgan and Elizabeth Webber =

Jason and Elizabeth
- Steve Burton and Rebecca Herbst as Jason and Elizabeth
- Duration: 2002–03; 2006–08
- Created by: Megan McTavish (Note: While seeds for the couple's story were planted in 1999 during Robert Guza, Jr.'s tenure, Jason and Elizabeth's actual romance doesn't start until 2002 during McTavish's tenure.)
- Introduced by: Jill Farren Phelps
In-universe information
- Other names: Liason
- Family: Quartermaine; Webber
- Children: Jacob Webber

Jason Morgan and Elizabeth Webber (commonly known as Liason for Liz and Jason) are fictional characters from the long running ABC Daytime soap opera, General Hospital and a popular supercouple pairing, according to TV Guide. Jason is portrayed by Steve Burton. Elizabeth is portrayed by Rebecca Herbst.

== Casting ==
Steve Burton first appeared in the role of Jason in December 1991, becoming the third actor to play the character since it was first introduced in 1983. Rebecca Herbst originated the role of Elizabeth on August 1, 1997. Burton left show in January 2000, and made various guest appearances before returning full-time in May 2002. Burton's return stopped the show's casting call for a potential love interest for Elizabeth, causing speculation that Elizabeth and Jason would become a couple. Herbst denied rumors of her departure in April 2002, stating on her website that Burton's return would affect her storyline.

In August 2009, Burton re-signed his contract after weeks of speculation that he might leave the series, and openly took a pay cut due to the declining economic climate. On January 18, 2011, ABC Daytime announced that Herbst had been let go from General Hospital and her exit would be storyline dictated. Burton was one of many costars to speak out about Herbst's firing, stating: "Most of you have heard the horrible and awful news about Becky. My heart breaks as I even have to tweet this. One of the best and most beautiful actresses that has been on this show. Beside that, she's a friend and that hurts. Some show will be lucky to have her. May god bless them through this transition." After much fan protest, a month after the original announcement, ABC released another statement saying that Herbst would retain her role on the show. Herbst renewed her contract in March 2012. Burton extended his contract in May 2011 for one year, and announced his departure in August 2012, staying long enough for his character to be written out of the series. In September 2014, it was announced that actor Billy Miller, known for his roles on All My Children and The Young & the Restless, would be taking over the role of Jason.

Burton won Soap Opera Digest Awards for Outstanding Younger Lead Actor in 1997 and 1998. He was nominated for the 1997 Daytime Emmy Award for Outstanding Younger Actor in a Drama Series and won the 1998 Daytime Emmy Award for Outstanding Supporting Actor in a Drama Series. In 1999, Herbst won the Soap Opera Digest Award for Outstanding Younger Lead Actress while Burton won for Hottest Male Star. Herbst also received an Emmy Award nomination for Outstanding Younger Actress in 1999. Burton was nominated for Outstanding Supporting Actor in 2000. He won Soap Opera Digest Awards for Outstanding Supporting Actor in 2003 and Outstanding Actor in 2005. Also in 2005, he received a nomination for the Daytime Emmy Award for Outstanding Lead Actor in a Drama Series in 2005. Herbst was nominated for the Daytime Emmy Award for Outstanding Supporting Actress in a Drama Series in 2007 and 2012.

== Storyline ==
In the summer of 1999, Elizabeth is reeling from the death of her first love, Lucky Spencer (then Jonathan Jackson), when she finds a friend in Jason. He helps her cope with her pain and they form a bond. When Jason is shot, Elizabeth takes him to her studio apartment and helps him recover. Later, Jason rescues Liz from Joseph Sorel (Joe Marinelli)'s bomb, which had been placed in her studio. Jason realizes that his friendship with Liz is putting her in danger and he leaves Port Charles, leaving Liz devastated. Soon after, Lucky (then Jacob Young) is revealed to be alive, but his relationship with Elizabeth struggles due to him having been brainwashed. Jason returns to town, and he and Liz reconnect, despite Lucky's disapproval.

When Liz is kidnapped by Sorel's men, Sonny Corinthos (Maurice Benard), Jason and Zander Smith (Chad Brannon) work together to rescue her. Jason notices the growing closeness between Liz and Zander, and gets a little jealous. When Sonny puts a hit out on Zander, at Elizabeth’s request, Jason allows him to hide out at his penthouse. Jason and Liz would try to make their relationship work, but decide to wait until Zander leaves before they are intimate. However, Elizabeth breaks things off with Jason after learning that Jason faked Sonny's death and kept it from her, putting her through unnecessary pain, and causing her to realize Jason's "world" was not one she wanted to be a part of. Despite multiple attempts to reconcile with Liz, all of which she rebuffed, Jason moved on and began dating Sonny's sister, Courtney Matthews (Alicia Leigh Willis). Liz was furious, as she still loved Jason in spite of pushing him away. She accused Courtney of wanting Jason to herself throughout their short-lived friendship.

Jason and Courtney married, and Liz married Ric Lansing (Rick Hearst), Sonny's brother. Ric genuinely loved Liz, but his resentment of his brother, and growing resentment and jealousy of the role Jason played in Sonny's life, resulted in Ric committing horrible acts, including kidnapping Sonny's pregnant wife, Carly (then Tamara Braun), and hiding her in a panic room in his home with Liz. During this period, Liz defended Ric, unaware of his actions, despite Jason's attempts at warning her. The two rekindled their friendship while Jason's sister and Liz's best friend, Emily Quartermaine (Natalia Livingston), was believed to be dying of cancer. This caused a great deal of jealousy from Courtney and Ric, who were threatened by the bond Liz and Jason still shared. Combined with grief over a miscarriage, Courtney turned to painkillers, resulting in an unintentional hit and run that temporarily blinded Elizabeth.

Liz eventually divorced Ric over his actions, and Jason and Courtney also divorced. Both Liz and Jason moved on separately, Liz reuniting with and marrying Lucky (Greg Vaughan), and Jason falling in love with Sam McCall (Kelly Monaco), Sonny's pregnant ex-mistress. When Manny Ruiz (Robert LaSardo) terrorized Port Charles, he kidnapped Liz for spontaneous leverage. Lucky was badly injured while trying to save her, but Jason came to the rescue. Lucky's injuries, resulting financial issues, and wounded pride, led to an addiction to prescription painkillers and increasing jealousy of the men in Liz's life, including Jason, who had a knack for always being there for her when she needed someone. Manny shoots Sam and seriously injures her, and Jason leaves Sam, believing he is protecting her. Liz and Jason reconnect as friends as their lives crumble around them.

Elizabeth's marriage to Lucky falls apart after Lucky's addiction leads to an affair with Maxie Jones (Kirsten Storms). Around that same time, Jason catches Sam sleeping with his enemy Ric. Liz shows up to Jason's. Jason and Liz have sex for the first time, both saddened over their heartbreaks. After Lucky checks into rehab, Jason and Liz decide to keep their one night stand together a secret to keep Lucky from relapsing. Elizabeth soon reveals that she is pregnant and Lucky promises to try harder at kicking his drug habit, which has directly led to two hard-falls for an expectant Liz. Jason and Elizabeth secretly order a paternity test. Jason asks Liz to marry him, regardless if whether he turns out to be the father or not. She turns him down, knowing they are both in love with other people, and not wanting to have him tied to her out of obligation instead of love. Jason reconciles with Sam, while Liz struggles with forgiving Lucky, and her own feelings for Jason, awakened the night they slept together.

As more people find out about Liz's pregnancy, people, mainly Jason's best friend, Carly (Laura Wright), believe that Elizabeth tricked Jason into getting her pregnant. It is discovered, though, that they'd used a defective batch of ELQ Enduro condoms for protection. When Liz finally does get the paternity test back, Sonny is with her and, by Elizabeth's reaction, believes Lucky is the father, and tells everyone the good news. Elizabeth burns the results of the paternity test on the roof and the audience never sees the results. Jason and Elizabeth were both taken hostage during the Metro Court hostage crisis. When the police storm the building, Jason carries Liz to safety and they end up getting stuck in the elevator. Elizabeth tells Jason that he is her baby's father, who is shocked and hurt at the news. He asks Liz, who is now divorced, to marry him again, but she refuses for the second time, and Jason thinks better of it when he admits that he loves Sam. Liz and Jason decide to keep the baby's paternity secret, but in the coming months, they grow closer, with Liz admitting she loves Jason. When Elizabeth passes out after going into labor, Jason finds Elizabeth and takes her to the hospital. Jason watches from the window as Elizabeth gives birth to a baby boy she names Jacob Martin Spencer (Jacob Martin would give him Jason initials J. M.), where Sam sees him and secretly learns the truth. Sam, reeling from the lies and betrayal, doesn't step in when Elizabeth's back is turned, and a grieving mother kidnaps Jake from his stroller. Many people suspect that Elizabeth, who is suffering from Postpartum depression at the time, may have hurt Jake. But it is Jason who believes her innocence and soon finds Jake with a woman named Maureen Harper, who had recently lost her child in a fire.

After Jason and Sam end their relationship which would be for 2 years, Sam goes after Lucky to get revenge on Elizabeth. Elizabeth and Jason admit they have feelings for one another, and Elizabeth moves into her own house, which Jason helps pay for. After Lucky and Liz's divorce, Sam threatens Elizabeth at the Black and White Ball to tell the truth. Liz learns that in addition to witnessing Jake's kidnapping, Sam hired two goons to scare Elizabeth and her kids at the park. Jason makes the decision to tell Lucky the truth and though he is furious, Jason, Liz, and Lucky decide to keep the secret to protect Jake from Jason's dangerous life. Shortly after, news of Emily's murder spreads across Port Charles. Jason and Liz find comfort in one another; the two soon began seeing one another in secret. Jason asks Liz to marry him and she happily accepted, but hours later, when Jason's nephew, Michael Corinthos (Dylan Cash) is shot, Jason decides to end their relationship. After Jake is kidnapped by Russian mobsters, Sam and Jason rescue him; Jason and Liz later realize they can never be a family.

On March 18, 2011, Elizabeth is momentarily distracted when Jake wanders out the front door. He gets hit by a car, and Elizabeth gets him to the hospital. Despite the doctor's efforts, Jake is declared brain dead and left on life support. Soon, Jason is forced to tell Elizabeth that his goddaughter, Josslyn Jacks, is suffering from advanced kidney cancer and that Jake could save her. Elizabeth furiously slaps Jason, reminding him that he was not in Jake's life and has no right to make a decision about whether he lives or dies after he "abandoned" his own son. Eventually, Lucky talks Liz into donating Jake's kidney and saving Josslyn. Subsequently, Jason and Elizabeth share an emotional conversation, during which Elizabeth apologizes for earlier stating that Jason abandoned Jake and for never letting him get to know his son. However, Jason tells her that, while he never did know Jake, he did know that he was loved and cared for, and he will always be grateful to her for that.

After Jake's death, Liz begins hallucinating and seeing Jake at work. She finds comfort with Jason, and learns that he and Sam have just gotten engaged. Jason married Sam, and the two were expecting their first child. However, when the baby died shortly after birth, Jason and Sam's marriage fell apart. Jason leaned on Elizabeth for support, and ended up kissing her impulsively. He backed off, and realized he still loved Sam. Eventually, Jason realized that the baby Sam buried wasn't hers, and asked for Elizabeth's help to prove that Sam's baby was alive. Elizabeth manipulated the results, though, hoping Jason would choose to be with her. However, Elizabeth later felt guilty, and admitted to Jason & Sam the truth. Jason found Sam's son, whom they named Daniel, and the two reunited. However, Jason was presumed dead shortly after, and Elizabeth was saddened.

Jason (now Billy Miller) was revealed to be alive a few years later, being held captive by Helena Cassadine (Constance Towers). When he escaped, he was in a car accident, and admitted to the hospital as a John Doe. He woke up after going through multiple surgeries, including facial reconstruction, but had no memory of his past life. He bonded with Elizabeth while recovering. When Elizabeth talked about Jake, Jason felt like the name seemed familiar, and started going by Jake, believing that was his name. Elizabeth let "Jake" move into her place while he sorted out his life. The two connected, but when a woman named Hayden Barnes (Rebecca Budig) showed up and claimed "Jake" was her husband, Elizabeth backed off and dated Ric, her ex-husband.

Lucky found out Elizabeth's son, Jake, was alive, and held captive on Cassadine Island by Helena. Jake was rescued and returned to Elizabeth. "Jake" met little Jake, and the two bonded. During the Nurses' Ball, Elizabeth got two major revelations: Ric had hired Hayden to pose as "Jake's" wife so Ric could date Elizabeth, and "Jake" was actually Jason. Afraid that Jason would get back with Sam if he knew the truth, Elizabeth kept his identity a secret. She broke up with Ric, and started a relationship with Jason. "Jake" still wanted answers, and asked for Sam's help to find out his identity. Elizabeth tried to dissuade him, wanting to hold onto Jason. "Jake" proposed to Elizabeth, and she accepted. On their wedding day, though, Jason found out the truth and stopped the wedding; Elizabeth pretended not to know. Jason still wasn't able to recover his memories, and stayed with Elizabeth. He asked Sam for a divorce to marry Elizabeth. Sam figured out Elizabeth's secret, though, and decided to confront her. Jason didn't believe Sam, and defended Elizabeth. However, he later went to apologize to Sam, who told Jason her suspicions. Jason left and confronted Elizabeth, who was forced to admit the truth. Heartbroken and angry, Jason broke up with Elizabeth, and moved out. Though he promised to still be part of Jake's life, Jason was done with Elizabeth.

After Jason left, strange occurrences started happening to Elizabeth and Jake. Their house was vandalized, and Jake thought he was being followed. Jason tried to help out Jake, promising to keep him safe. However, he & Elizabeth later figured out that Jake was staging the situations, in hopes that his parents would reconcile. Sam realized what Jake was doing, and tried to help Jake, but she got injured and knocked unconscious. Scared by what had happened to Sam, Jake ran away and was hit by a car. He was rushed to the hospital where Jake survived, and Jason and Elizabeth let him be admitted to a children's hospital for treatment. Sam was rescued by Jason, and also recovered. When Sam showed up with Danny to visit Jake at the hospital, Elizabeth realized that Jason & Sam had reconnected, and Jason had moved on. Jason and Elizabeth talked about their relationship and past while Jake was recovering, and they eventually made peace, agreeing to co-parent Jake and be friends.

== Reception and impact ==
“[The fans] are incredible, aren't they? No other word for them, and they are dedicated and they do not get discouraged, which is amazing. And it's been 7 or 8 years of them writing before Steve Burton (Jason) and I had a storyline together. (...) Without them, for sure, my storyline with Steve would have fallen flat long ago, but they really kept it going.”

— Herbst, on Jason and Elizabeth fans.

Despite never having been paired together on-screen for an extended length of time, Jason and Elizabeth have had very vocal fans. Burton told Soap Opera Digest during the couple's 2008 break up: "We had quite the following for a couple who never were together. I don't write the show. If it was up to me, I would have played it out to see where it went." Herbst reflected in 2010: "I would have said Jason and Elizabeth would never be together quite a few years ago, and Steve said the same thing. We kept telling the Liason girls, 'Stop writing, because nothing is going to happen. It's been 7 years... get over it.' Steve would joke and sure enough it happened, so I will never say never." Zap2it named them No. 2 on their list of Top Couples of 2007, while putting Elizabeth and Sam McCall (Kelly Monaco), Jason's other love interest, as No. 1 of their Top 10 Rivalries of 2007, stating, "without question Liz vs. Sam is the biggest rivalry in daytime."Zap2it tied them for No. 3 in 2008 along with entangled couple Sam and Lucky Spencer (then Greg Vaughan), stating: "Liason fans have been waiting for their couple to be together for years, but even when these two, or the writers or executives in charge of the storyline, can't seem to get their act together, their fans still hold on tight." In 2008, Jason and Elizabeth were ranked No. 12 by Soaps In Depth of the Top 100 Greatest Couples of ABC Daytime. Jason and Elizabeth placed No. 5 for all General Hospital couples on the list. In February 2009, they were voted No. 1 favorite General Hospital supercouple of all time by participants of a SheKnows Entertainment online survey. In July 2010, Liz and Jason won the ABC Soaps In Depth "Supercouple Smackdown". The pair beat out every other ABC pairing to win the title for favorite supercouple. Zap2it named them No. 6 of the Top 10 Soap Opera Couples of 2012.

In 2024, Jason and Elizabeth were included in ABC Soaps in Depth 50 Greatest Soap Opera Couples of all time. Jason and Elizabeth were ranked No. 20 on the list.

== See also ==
- List of supercouples
