= Sam McCall =

Fictional character from General Hospital

- General Hospital character
- Kelly Monaco as Sam McCall
- Portrayed by: Kelly Monaco (2003–2024); Lindsay Hartley (2020, 2022, 2024)
- Duration: 2003–2024
- First appearance: October 1, 2003
- Last appearance: December 9, 2024
- Created by: Charles Pratt, Jr. and Robert Guza, Jr.
- Introduced by: Jill Farren Phelps
- Book appearances: The Secret Life of Damian Spinelli
In-universe information
- Other names: Sandra McIntire; Angela Monroe; Sam Morgan (2011–2018); Sabrina Santiago (2014); Sam Cain (2018); Hannah Reade; Kitty Garber
- Occupation: Con artist (pre–2004); Scuba diver; Hospital clerk; Host of Everyday Heroes (2007); Private investigator (2009–2024); ELQ shareholder (2012–2024); Media mogul (2017–2018); Co-owner of Aurora Media (2017–2018)
- Family: Jerome; Cassadine
- Parents: Julian Jerome; Alexis Davis
- Adoptive parents: Cody McCall (illegal); Evelyn Bass (illegal)
- Brothers: Danny McCall (illegal)
- Half-brothers: Lucas Jones; Leo Falconeri; Andrew Nero
- Half-sisters: Kristina Davis; Molly Lansing
- Spouse: Jason Morgan (2011–2018); Drew Cain (2018)
- Civil partner: Drew Cain (2016–2018)
- Sons: Danny Morgan
- Daughters: Lila McCall; Scout Cain
- Adoptive sons: Rafe Kovich, Jr. (foster)
- Stepsons: Jake Webber (2011–2018); Oscar Nero (2018)
- Grandfathers: Victor Jerome; Mikkos Cassadine
- Grandmothers: Kristin Bergman
- Uncles: Stavros Cassadine; Stefan Cassadine; Valentin Cassadine; Dino Antoinelli; Evan Jerome
- Aunts: Olivia St. John; Ava Jerome; Kristina Cassadine
- Nephews: Jonah Corinthos (adoptive)
- Nieces: Irene Davis-Ashford
- First cousins: Evan Jerome, Jr.; Kiki Jerome; Avery Corinthos; Nikolas Cassadine; Charlotte Cassadine

Sam McCall is a fictional character from General Hospital, an American soap opera on the ABC network. Created by Charles Pratt, Jr. and Robert Guza, Jr., the character made her debut on the episode airing on October 1, 2003, portrayed by Kelly Monaco. Sam is the daughter of mob boss Julian Jerome (William deVry) and attorney Alexis Davis (Nancy Lee Grahn), born and placed for adoption when both were teenagers. She arrived in town as a con artist trying to reverse her family's bad luck by destroying the five lucky cards of the "Dead Man's Hand." Upon her arrival, she was characterized as a "sexy bad girl, with a nose for intrigue." Since her introduction, the character has matured into a self-assured and confident woman, while still retaining traces of her adventuresome, bad girl ways.

Monaco's performance has been met with critical acclaim, having garnered her the Daytime Emmy Award nomination for Outstanding Lead Actress in a Drama Series in 2006. In 2024, Monaco departed the role when Sam died of a heart attack.

== Casting ==
The role of Samantha McCall was originated by former Baywatch star and Playboy's April 1997 Playmate of the Month, Kelly Monaco on October 1, 2003. Monaco, who had previously portrayed Livvie Locke on the ABC Daytime spinoff soap opera Port Charles, was one of several performers from the cancelled soap to join the cast of the main show. Monaco had also auditioned for ABC Daytime's All My Children as well as CBS Daytime's As the World Turns, both of which were based in New York at the time, and Monaco's eagerness to stay on the West coast led to her ultimately signing with General Hospital, based in Los Angeles.

In 2005, Monaco joined the first season of ABC's Dancing with the Stars and was the first champion of what turned into a multi-season competition.

In August 2009, a casting call was sent out to recast the role of Sam, leaving fans shocked by her possible departure. Despite rumors and speculation, Monaco's co-stars Steve Burton (Jason Morgan) and Nancy Lee Grahn (Alexis Davis) denied she was departing from the show. Monaco herself dispelled the rumors, stating there was "really no doubt" she would renew her contract; it was merely standard procedure for ABC to release the casting call since she and the network had not signed off on a new contract by a set deadline.

In July 2020, it was announced that Monaco would take temporary leave from the role; in a social media post, Monaco's mother cited her need to take a 14-day self-isolated quarantine—following a "breathing problem" after production resumed—related to the COVID-19 pandemic in the United States. As a result, the role was recast with Lindsay Hartley, who appeared from August 4 to August 13, 2020. Monaco returned to the role on August 18. Hartley briefly filled in for Monaco again on February 3, 4 and 7, 2022. Hartley re-assumed the role for two episodes in August 2024, and again for several episodes beginning September 16.

On August 26, 2024, Soap Opera Network announced Monaco had been fired following a network decision to "terminate her character". She made her final appearance on November 1 of the same year, and a further appearance during the final moments of the December 9 episode.

== Storylines ==
=== Backstory ===
Samantha, also known as Sam, is born on May 11, 1980, (Mother's Day) in Chatham, Maine, (Note: Though Chatham is established by the series as being a town in Maine, in real life, Chatham is actually a town in New Hampshire and it meets with the border of Maine.) to a 16-year-old Alexis Davidovitch (Nancy Lee Grahn). While at boarding school, Alexis' father, Mikkos Cassadine (John Colicos), forces her to give the child up and later forges documents to make Alexis believe the child is dead.

Sam is adopted by Cody McCall (Stanley Kamel) and his wife, Evelyn Bass, who choose adoption based on fear of having another mentally handicapped baby like their first child Danny (then Henri Lubatti). Cody is a con artist and his way of life forces Evelyn to leave when Sam is only three years old, taking Danny with her. Cody raises Sam on his own and teaches her the art of the con. When Sam is 17, she tracks down Evelyn in Bailey's Beach, South Carolina, and is shocked to find Danny locked in the basement. When Sam helps Danny escape, he accidentally knocks a candle over that burns down the house, not knowing Evelyn was inside. Sam is arrested for arson, but gets out on bail and goes on the run with Danny to avoid being convicted for Evelyn's murder. A young Sam does her best to care for Danny but eventually resorts to extreme measures to pay his bills. Using skills she learned from Cody, Sam marries several wealthy men, and steals their money so she can care for her brother. During her last attempt at a con as "Angela Monroe", Sam finds herself in an abusive situation when her wealthy mark, Bill Monroe, discovers Sam's intentions, and attacks her. Sam ends up killing Bill in self-defense.

=== 2003–2007 ===
Sam first appears in Port Charles working with Jasper Jacks (Ingo Rademacher) to find the five lucky cards of the "Dead Man's Hand." They have a brief affair, but when Jax's father dies, he blames Sam, due to her scheming. Sam then has an affair with Sonny Corinthos (Maurice Benard), who is married, and becomes pregnant. His best friend Jason Morgan (Steve Burton) claims to be the child's father to keep Sonny's family together. Jason and Sam bond as Sam prepares to give birth and they decide to raise the child together. She decides to name her daughter Lila after Jason's grandmother, Lila Quartermaine (Anna Lee).

Sonny's daughter Kristina Davis (then Kali Rodriguez) is diagnosed with a blood disease, and Sam's daughter is proven to be a donor match. Kristina's mother, Alexis Davis (Nancy Lee Grahn), begs Sam to induce labor two weeks early in order to donate her child's stem cells. Sam refuses, fearing it could hurt the baby. While arguing with Alexis, Sam collapses and Baby Girl McCall is stillborn. Sam is heartbroken over the loss of her daughter, and angry at Alexis, blaming her for her baby's death. Jason grieves with Sam and helps her through the aftermath; they fall in love, eventually getting engaged. Sam helps deliver a baby girl during a storm to a teenage mother named Bridget Daly. Bridget gives her baby to Sam, as she's unable to provide for it. Sam and Jason plan to adopt baby Hope. Bridget decides to keep the baby, leaving Sam devastated. Sam is accused of kidnapping Kristina soon after, and she and Jason try to find her to prove Sam's innocence. After Sonny's sons, Michael (then Dylan Cash) and Morgan, are also kidnapped, Sam is cleared of suspicion.

Jason and Sam are on a trip when they are kidnapped by Allegra Montenegro, played by Meg Bennett, the wife of Executive Producer at the time Robert Guza, Jr. Allegra wants Sam to pose as her daughter, Alicia, and marry Andrew Olsen to help the Montenegros regain their rich lifestyle. The storyline was received as an attempt to win ratings due to Monaco's recent success on the first season of Dancing with the Stars, as Sam is forced to learn to ballroom dance in order to make Andrew believe she is really Alicia. When Andrew is killed, Sam is nearly sent to jail until Alicia is arrested for the murder. Sam is released, and she and Jason return to Port Charles.

As Sam settles back into her life, Manny Ruiz (Robert LaSardo) began stalking her. When several Port Charles residents are infected by the encephalitis plague, Danny dies; Sam blames Alexis since she received the last antidote over Danny. After Danny's death, Sam discovers that she was adopted, and her biological mother is Alexis. Sam keeps it to herself, wanting nothing to do with Alexis. However, when Sam is shot by Manny and near death, Jason tells Alexis the truth. Alexis pressures Jason into ending the relationship, but Sam tries to win him back. When all of her efforts fail, she and Alexis get into a heated argument, during which Alexis insults her and calls her derogatory names. Angry, Sam gets drunk and has a one-night stand with Alexis's husband, Ric Lansing (Rick Hearst). Ric later frames Sam for theft, forcing her to go on the run. She and Jason are ambushed by thugs, and Sam appears to kill Diego Alcazar (Ignacio Serricchio) as Kristina watches. Sam and Jason reconcile, and Sam hopes to have a child, but finds out she is infertile from her shooting.

After Sam escapes during the Metro Court Hotel hostage crisis and warns the police, television producer Amelia Joffe (Annie Wersching) hires her as the host of the new talk show, Everyday Heroes. However, Amelia is actually looking for revenge on Sam for killing her father, Bill Monroe. Sam does her best to keep her past from coming out and she begins lying to Jason. Meanwhile, Sam learns that Elizabeth Spencer's (Rebecca Herbst) son, Jake, is actually Jason's son. Sam witnesses Jake get kidnapped, but doesn't say anything. After Jake is rescued, Jason finds out about Sam and Jake, and they began a 2-year break up; she also hires actors to scare Elizabeth and Jake in the park. Sam fakes a rescue, but Jason finds out Sam hired the gunmen; he threatens to kill Sam for her out of control actions.

=== 2008–2012 ===
Sam seduced Elizabeth's husband Lucky Spencer (then Greg Vaughan) to get revenge on Jason and Liz, but they eventually fall in love. However, once Lucky finds out about Sam's part in Jake's kidnapping, they split up. Meanwhile, Sam is stalked and injured by the Text Message Killer, who is later revealed to be an alive Diego Alcazar. While fleeing from Diego she is struck by a car driven by Monica Quartermaine (Leslie Charleson), who is under the influence of alcohol. Sam forgives Monica, helping her get a lenient sentence to rehab. When Sam and Damian Spinelli (Bradford Anderson) start their own investigative agency, Jason and Sam begin to grow close again. Sam realizes that a teenage Kristina is becoming rebellious and tries to help her. When Claudia Zacchara (Sarah Joy Brown) has an accident, Sam worries that Kristina is responsible; Jason tells her he thinks it was Michael. When the two teens run away to Mexico, Sam and Jason chase after them. Sam is kidnapped by Jerry Jacks (Sebastian Roché), but rescued by Jason, and the two locate Michael and Kristina. After returning to Port Charles, Sam and Jason get back together for the first time in 2 years. Jason is stalked by crazed artist Franco (then James Franco), who kidnaps and threatens Sam to get to Jason. Sam shares with Kristina her experience of being in an abusive relationship after Kristina is beaten by her boyfriend, Kiefer Bauer (Christian Alexander).

After Michael is sent to prison, Sam struggles with Jason going to prison so he can protect Michael. Jason is eventually released, and later that year must protect Brenda Barrett (Vanessa Marcil) from the European crime boss The Balkan (Daniel Benzali). During Sonny and Brenda's wedding, Sam is nearly killed in a car bomb set for Brenda, but she survives. Sam has reconstructive surgery so she and Jason can have a baby. Sam and Jason soon become engaged and get married. During their honeymoon, Sam becomes pregnant with Jason's child. Franco shows up and drugs them both, locks Jason in a room, and forces him to watch as he supposedly rapes Sam. Sam discovers she's pregnant after returning home, and a paternity test establishes Jason as the father.

Jason's cousin Heather Webber (Robin Mattson) tells Sam that Franco and Jason are fraternal twin brothers, and a new DNA test shows Franco is the father of Sam's baby. Jason is unsure if he can love Franco's child, and Sam moves out. Sam gives birth to a baby boy with the help of John McBain (Michael Easton), but she passes out and is unaware that Todd Manning (Roger Howarth) and Heather switch the baby with the stillborn son of Téa Delgado (Florencia Lozano). Sam wakes up, and believes her son is dead. The pain and grief overwhelms her, and she decides to file for a divorce from Jason. Sam continues to confide in John, and they share a flirtation. Jason figures out the truth about Sam's son, but by the time he figures it out, Heather has kidnapped the baby. Jason and Sam reunite and rescue their son, naming him Daniel Edward Morgan. The two reconcile, but Jason disappears after being shot by Cesar Faison (Anders Hove); he is presumed dead, but Sam remains determined to find him. After Jason disappears, Sam finds out that Jason is Danny's biological father.

=== 2013–2015 ===
Sam eventually realizes that Jason is not coming back and tries to move on. Lucy Coe (Lynn Herring) comes to town, and claims John is a vampire named Caleb Morley. Sam believes Lucy is insane, until a woman named Alison Barrington (Erin Hershey) is murdered, and her son, Rafe Kovich, Jr. (Jimmy Deshler), claims John is the murderer. Sam is kidnapped by Caleb, but rescued by John, Rafe, and Lucy. Sam later becomes a foster mother to Rafe. Sam meets Dr. Silas Clay (Michael Easton), Rafe's uncle, who decides to get physical custody of Rafe from Sam. Though the court sides with Silas, he lets Rafe stay with Sam. Meanwhile, Sam finds out that Danny has leukemia, and needs treatment. Silas assists in Danny's recovery, but determines Danny will need a bone marrow transplant. When no one is a match, Sam asks Alexis about her biological father. Alexis admits she doesn't know who Sam's father is, because she never met him again. Alexis undergoes hypnosis to help Sam, and finds out Sam's father's name is "Julian." Sam finds a bone marrow match for Danny to Derek Wells (William DeVry), and Danny recovers. Alexis figures out that Sam's father is Julian Jerome, a mobster presumed dead. Sam and Silas start dating, and Sam finds out that "Derek" is actually Julian, who plans to take over Sonny's territory. When Sonny threatens to kill him, Julian uses Danny as leverage to stay alive, in case Danny suffers a setback. Sam is disgusted with her father's actions, and writes him off.

Rafe died after being taken off life support following an accident, and Silas accused Patrick Drake (Jason Thompson), Rafe's doctor, of deliberately killing him because Rafe caused a car accident that led to the death of Patrick's son. Sam knew Patrick didn't kill Rafe, which led to her and Silas breaking up. Sam befriended "Jake Doe" (Billy Miller), an amnesiac patient at the hospital who had facial reconstruction surgery after an accident. She also started a relationship with Patrick. After Faison is arrested, Sam was taken hostage by a gunman who helped Faison escape. Sam wanted to find the gunman, and realized it was Jake. Though he denied the accusation, Jake was arrested, and Sam confronted him. Jake realized that he had been brainwashed by Helena Cassadine (Constance Towers), and Sam's accusations were correct. Sam forgave him, and helped him get a job and figure out his real identity. Sam got engaged to Patrick, but right after, she found out that "Jake" is actually Jason. Sam reeled from the news, trying to process what to do. Jason went to Cassadine Island to confront Helena, and Sam followed him there. Helena continued to taunt Jason, and Sam lashed out, furious at Helena for keeping Jason from her and Danny. Helena retaliated by cursing Sam before supposedly dying. Sam returned to Port Charles, where Patrick realized that Sam was still in love with Jason, and broke off their engagement. Sam was heartbroken, but accepted his decision.

=== 2016–2024 ===
Jason and Sam began to reconnect, as Jason started to experience memory flashes while spending time with Sam. When Elizabeth's house was broken into, Jason asked for Sam's help investigating. Sam figured out that Elizabeth and Jason's son, Jake, was responsible. Sam ended up getting seriously injured when she discovered the truth, but Jason was able to rescue her. Though the two reconnected, Sam decided to get a divorce, wanting to not pressure Jason to remember their past. Jason agreed, and the two divorced, but started dating. Jason ends up recovering his memories after getting into an accident, and reunites with Sam. Sam went into hiding with Jason after Nikolas Cassadine (Tyler Christopher) disappeared, and Jason was accused of killing him. She and Jason figured out that Nikolas faked his death, and tracked him down to Cassadine Island. Before they could bring Nikolas back, they were taken hostage by Valentin Cassadine (James Patrick Stuart). Sam and Jason escaped, and managed to free the other hostages. They returned to Port Charles, and cleared Jason's name. Soon after, Sam found out she was pregnant, and was thrilled until she found out that she could have been exposed to malaria. Sam shares her news with Jason; despite the potential risk to the baby, Jason is elated. He proposes to Sam, and they get engaged again. Sam learns she is malaria free, assuring her the baby is healthy thanks to their new friend Hamilton Finn (Michael Easton). She and Jason get married again.

Sam eventually starts to bond with Julian and gives her blessing for him to marry Alexis. However, she disowns him again after he lets Alexis get arrested for a crime he committed, then tries to kill her when Alexis exonerates herself. He's put on trial for his crimes, but ends up getting acquitted. Soon after, Julian's car explodes, killing Morgan Corinthos (Bryan Craig). Sam and Jason investigate; at first, they suspect Sonny, but Jason finds out he's innocent. He and Sam try to find the real killer to prove Sonny's innocence. The clues lead Sam to discover that Morgan was killed by Olivia St. John (Tonja Walker), Julian's sister. Olivia kidnaps Sam and when she tries to escape, she is severely injured by Olivia and left unconscious. Sam survives, but ends up going into labor. Jason finds her, and helps Sam give birth to Emily Scout Morgan. They're immediately taken to the hospital, where Sam ends up in a coma after surgery; she wakes up and recovers

On New Year's Eve 2017, Jason and Sam share a kiss, but Drew interrupts them. Jason wants to get back together with Sam, but soon learns that Sam and Drew are getting married. Sam, burying her feelings for Jason, asks him for divorce. Jason and Sam divorce, and she remarries Drew. Soon after they become official co-owners of Aurora Media. In early March, in the aftermath of the earthquake, Sam finally admits that she is still in love with Jason. After telling Drew the truth, he leaves her and they later divorce. In May 2018, she goes into business with Curtis Ashford (Donnell Turner) forming a new PI agency named Ashford & McCall Investigators. In October 2018, Sam & Jason became lovers again, after divorcing him nine months ago. In 2019, Sam was sexually harassed by Shiloh, but she would later be held hostage and throw down by him. In Fall 2019, Shiloh was trying to rape Sam, Jason arrived and shot him and Shiloh was dead. On October 14, 2019, Sam was arrested and framed for Shiloh's murder. At the end of 2019, Sam was convicted of involuntary manslaughter, and then released on parole.

In early 2020, Sam had a visit from her parole officer Dolores Maloney, who told her she could not have any firearms or alcohol in the house. Sam grew upset when Dolores told her to stay away from Jason, and when Jason came home, she said it would be the last time they see each other. She explained that she had to stay away from Jason or else she will go back to prison. Jason and Sam went to see Robert Scorpio (Tristan Rogers) for help getting a new parole officer. Although he initially refused, Jason and Sam offered to hand him Peter August (Wes Ramsey), who framed Sam for hiring Bryce Henderson and was responsible for Drew's presumed death and the two murder attempts on Andre Maddox. But sadly, due to the terms of her parole, and the huge threat of drug kingpin Cyrus Renault (Jeff Kober), she cannot be with Jason. On April 6, 2020, Sam officially broke up with Jason, when he decided to end things in order to keep his family safe from the brewing mob war between the Corinthos mob family and Cyrus. Eventually, Jason and Sam got back together again. In August 2020, Sam was let off of parole after a deal she made with Valentin, giving him the proxy of her children's ELQ shares. She and Jason were finally free to be together now, but with the impending mob war, Sam became increasing concerned about her children's safety. In November 2020, when the Floating Rib bar exploded, Sam was terrified and unable to cope. On December 9, 2020, Sam tells Jason her fears and says that she has to end her relationship with him after nearly 20 years. She asks him not to come back home to their penthouse after he leaves, which makes Jason upset and initially he fights her on it, but relents not wanting to make things any harder. He respects her decision and tearfully leaves.

Despite their separation, they remained committed to raising the children together. On Christmas Eve 2020, Sam was hanging stockings with Scout and Danny who were both upset that Jason wasn't there, so Sam invited him over to spend the night and spend Christmas morning together as a family. As 2021 began, Sam began to grow closer to Dante. On March 19, 2021, Dante and Sam holding Peter at gunpoint and tried to talk him down. In May 2021, when Dante rejoined PCPD as a police detective, he's assigned to find Jason and Britt who are fugitives. Sam wants to find them too and follows Dante and then deflates his tire when she locates them. Sam wants to escort Jason safely to Canada for the kid's sake, but Jason decides to go with Britt in order to protect Sam and keep her hands clean. On May 20, 2021, Sam finally owes Dante for slashing his tire. They fight, he tells her that Jason in Canada. On May 27, 2021, Sam and Dante playfully trask-talk each other. They share a close moment when he gives her some tips on how to play baseball but he later joked with her to forget everything he taught her. On June 7, 2021, Sam tries to defend Maxie and drags Dante out of the room. On June 15, 2021, Sam and Dante both end up investigating the Country House where a fake Chloe Jennings kidnapped Maxie. A local doctor named Austin who helped Maxie deliver her baby, comes in and says he owns the house.

In July 2021, Sam overhears Michael say that Jason and Carly are getting married for business. She gets drunk with Elizabeth at the pier and burns some of her old items from her relationship with Jason (dominoes, tequila, and a black leather jacket). Then for the first time since her breakup with Jason, Sam finally declares her independence to Dante. Later, he takes her to see the fireworks, she tells him that Jason and Carly are getting married. She then kisses him for the first time. On July 16, 2021, Sam arrives at the Metro Court restaurant and sees Jason and Carly and complements Carly's engagement ring. Jason apologized to her for not being the one to tell her about his engagement, and he wondered if she would have told Danny. She asked him when he and Carly had decided to get married, and he talked about their "shared loss" of Sonny.

Sam added to him that she'd always known that Jason and Carly were both first on the other's list, ahead of everyone else, then she walked away from him. Then Sam approached Carly and took her aside to talk to her . Sam knew that Jason and Carly wouldn't have gotten engaged without a good reason, so she advised Carly to let her know if Carly needed anything. Then she was asked by Maxie if everything was all right with Jason, because she heard about Sam and Elizabeth's bonfire. Sam insisted that she was at peace, but Maxie thought Sam would only be able to get peace with someone else to go home to. Sam thought back to Dante kissing her, but disagreed with Maxie's statement. Sam informed Maxie that she'd kissed someone, but it hadn't mean anything.

== Character development ==
=== Introduction ===
"Sam is a fighter. She's going to put her walls up when she feels turned on or lied to or manipulated. It's her truth. Whether or not people can see that or accept it from her point of view, she's an injured bird, and she's just trying to stay alive."

— Kelly Monaco describes her character (2013)

When the character is introduced, Sam is described as "an adventurous woman trying to reverse her family's bad fortune", who would immediately interact with character Jasper Jacks (Rademacher). She is independent and scheming. Soaps In Depth named the character on their list of the 50 naughtiest soap opera vixens in 2009. When she first arrives in town, she is portrayed as a con artist and bad girl, who knew how to get what she wanted. The motivation behind the character's bad girl ways were revealed, when it was discovered that she was raised on the road by a con artist father, Cody McCall, and used cons to provide for her mentally handicapped older brother, Danny McCall. Sam grows close to Jason Morgan during her pregnancy with the child of Sonny Corinthos. Co-star Burton (Jason) later explained: "It's been a long journey for Jason and Sam. When they first got together, it wasn't really supposed to be that they got together. He was kind of helping her out with her pregnancy. After that whole time they fell in love." When the couple broke up in 2008, Monaco said to Soap Opera Digest, "I feel Sam and Jason was so abruptly ended without any explanation, really, as to the coldness that was so one-sided [on Jason's part]. Of course, Jake came into play, but I felt like Jason and Sam were always strong enough to overcome." Sam begins a relationship with Lucky Spencer to get back at Elizabeth. Monaco describes the progression of the relationship to Soap Opera Digest, "In the beginning it was very calculated and manipulative. Eventually, it turned genuine. [...] finally, she found someone who is trustworthy."

=== Parentage revealed ===
The revelation of Alexis Davis (Grahn) as Sam's biological mother was a turning point in the development of the character. The two characters had a rocky past filled with disdain, but the shocking revelation of their kinship forced the characters to co-exist. The newly formed mother-daughter relationship was very antagonistic in its early stages, but over time the two characters were able to reconcile and put the hate of their past behind them. Now the two characters share a close mother-daughter bond. The revelation of Alexis and Sam as mother and daughter was named the best revelation of the decade by SOAPnet. The unveiling of Alexis as Sam's mother led to widespread speculation as to the identity of Sam's biological father. For years, great fanfare was generated around this mystery in anticipation for the revelation of his identity.

"There's also the ongoing mystery of Sam's father and that's not lost on me. Obviously [Sam's mother] Alexis is withholding something huge, otherwise she'd reveal the dad's identity. Our viewers always ask about that and I want them to know I will address it. I just need to figure out the best timing. [Laughs] It's always good to have some Cassadine secrets in your back pocket!"

— Ron Carlivati on revealing Sam's father (2013)

Seven years after Alexis was revealed as Sam's mother, General Hospital began dropping hints that they were ready to tackle the highly anticipated story of Sam's father. In 2013 General Hospital head-writer, Ron Carlivati addressed the ongoing mystery of Sam's father in an interview with TV Guide's Michael Logan. Widespread speculation about the identity of Sam's father was reignited when it was rumored that General Hospital was looking for a "name actor" to cast in the role of Sam's father. Rumors began to circulate naming Duke Lavery (Ian Buchanan), Blackie Parrish (John Stamos) and Dr. Kevin Collins (Jon Lindstrom) as potential candidates for Sam's father; Lindstrom having previously worked opposite Monaco as her father on the soap opera Port Charles. Another rumor emerged that veteran soap actor, Peter Reckell, who played Bo Brady on the NBC soap opera Days of Our Lives from 1983 to 2012, would be joining General Hospital in the role of Evan Jerome. It was widely speculated that Reckell was cast to play Sam's father, linking her to the Jerome crime family that was prominent on General Hospital in the 1980s. However, after weeks of speculation, Reckell addressed the rumors stating that he wasn't going back to Days of Our Lives or joining any other soap. In July 2013, ABC unveiled its latest General Hospital promo which showed Sam asking Alexis for the identity of her father. In the storyline, Sam's young son Danny has leukemia and they are trying to find as many potential bone marrow donors as possible.

Following the promo's release, Nancy Lee Grahn (Alexis), took to her Twitter account to engage fans in a guessing game as to the identity of Sam's father. During the week the promo was released, it was announced that actor William deVry, who formerly starred on The Bold and the Beautiful as Storm Logan, and All My Children as Michael Cambias was joining General Hospital. There were reports that deVry had taped scenes with Maura West's Ava Jerome, leading to speculation that deVry could be joining the show as a Jerome and as Sam's father. deVry made his debut on July 30, 2013, under the alias Derek Wells, and it was soon revealed that he was actually Julian Jerome—son of mob boss Victor Jerome who was head of the Port Charles mob in the 1980s. Soon after the real identity of deVry's character was discovered, it was confirmed that deVry had been cast as Sam's father, when it was revealed that Sam's biological father is crime figure Julian Jerome.

== Reception ==
When Monaco originated the role of Sam, her performance was well received by viewers and the network. In 2006, Monaco was nominated for a Daytime Emmy Award in the category of Outstanding Lead Actress in a Drama Series for her portrayal of Sam. She also co-hosted the Daytime Emmy Awards that same year. In 2023, Charlie Mason from Soaps She Knows placed Sam at #24 on his ranked list of General Hospital’s 40+ Greatest Characters of All Time, commenting "Jason Morgan’s onetime ride-or-die boasts an enviably all-over-the-place soap-character resumé that’s taken her from con artist and stepfather seductress to action heroine, “widowed” wife and mom. Along that bumpy road, the one thing she's never been... is boring!" In 2024, as part of their year-end review, Soap Opera News editor Michael Thomas listed Monaco's exit as Sam as their most-shocking soap opera exit of the year.

== See also ==
- Jason Morgan and Sam McCall
