= Jason Morgan (General Hospital) =

- General Hospital character
- Steve Burton as Jason Morgan
- Portrayed by: Quinn Carlson (1981–1982); Bryan Beck (1982–1988); Steve Burton (1991–2012, 2017–present); Carmel Fainbaum (2012); Billy Miller (2014–2017); Paul Chirico (2017)
- Duration: 1981–1988; 1991–2012; 2017–2021; 2024–present
- First appearance: November 11, 1981
- Created by: Thom Racina and Leah Laiman
- Introduced by: Gloria Monty (1981, 1991); Frank Valentini (2014, 2017, 2024)
- Book appearances: Robin's Diary; The Secret Life of Damian Spinelli
- Spin-off appearances: General Hospital: Night Shift
- Billy Miller as Jason Morgan
In-universe information
- Other names: Jason Moore (birth name); Jason Morgan Quartermaine (1983–1996); Patient 6 (2017); Jesse Nichols (2018); Joshua James (2021); Alan Jacobs (2021–2024); John Moore (2025)
- Occupation: FBI informant (2021–2024); Military contractor and mercenary (2021–2024); Mob enforcer (1996–2012,2017–2021, 2024-2026); Businessman (1996–2012,2026-present); Coffee importer (1996–2012,2017–2021,2024-2026); Restaurant owner (2009–2012)
- Family: Quartermaine
- Parents: Alan Quartermaine; Susan Moore
- Adoptive mother: Monica Quartermaine
- Brothers: Drew Cain
- Half-brothers: A. J. Quartermaine
- Half-sisters: Skye Quartermaine (adoptive); Dawn Winthrop (adoptive); Emily Quartermaine (adoptive)
- Spouse: Brenda Barrett (2002–2003); Courtney Matthews (2003–2004); Sam McCall (2011–2018); Carly Corinthos (2021)
- Sons: Jake Webber; Danny Morgan
- Grandparents: Edward Quartermaine; Lila Quartermaine
- Uncles: Bradley Ward; Jimmy Lee Holt
- Aunts: Tracy Quartermaine; Veronica Bard (adoptive)
- Nephews: Michael Corinthos; Oscar Nero
- Nieces: Lila Rae Alcazar (adoptive); Scout Cain
- First cousins: Justus Ward; Austin Gatlin-Holt; Faith Ward; Ned Ashton; Dillon Quartermaine

Jason Morgan is a fictional character on the ABC soap opera, General Hospital. Created by Thom Racina and Leah Laiman, he is most notably played by Daytime Emmy Award-winning actor Steve Burton, who joined the cast in 1991 and vacated the role in 2012. Burton later reprised the role from 2017 to 2021, and again in 2024. Jason was born offscreen in September 1981 and the character made his onscreen debut weeks later but was seen portrayed by a child actor in November 1981 as the son of Dr. Alan Quartermaine (Stuart Damon) and his mistress, Susan Moore (Gail Ramsey), later adopted by Alan's wife Dr. Monica Quartermaine (Leslie Charleson). As one of the longest-running characters on the show, the role was played by various child actors from 1981 to 1988. In 2014, Billy Miller was cast in the role. With Burton's 2017 return, Miller's casting was later retconned as Jason's twin brother, Andrew Cain.

== Development ==
=== Casting ===
The role was originated on November 11, 1981, by Quinn Carlson until June 3, 1982. Child actor Bryan Beck stepped into the role on September 8, 1982, appearing until December 26, 1988.

On December 19, 1991, Burton stepped into the role on a contractual basis as a SORASed Jason Quartermaine. In November 1999, ABC confirmed that Burton had decided not to renew his contract which expired in December, in order to pursue other opportunities. Burton last appeared on contract on January 27, 2000. In June 2000, ABC confirmed that Burton would reprise his role for a six-week stint starting on August 25, 2000, until he last appeared on October 10, 2000. In December 2000, it was announced that Burton would return to the series once again and began airing on January 29, 2001. In January 2001, Burton announced that his return was only temporary due to his commitment to film a pilot for his DreamWorks Television development deal. Whether he returned to the role full-time would depend on whether the series was picked up. The pilot was not picked up, Burton landed a role in a major motion picture leading to his departure on April 23, 2001. Burton returned to the series on contract in 2002 during May Sweeps, airing on May 24.

In late 2008, Burton's contract expired and forcing to make a decision on re-signing with the show. After months of speculation, he announced in a public appearance that he re-signed with the show. Burton stated that he would be willing to take a pay cut because he understands that money is a lot tighter now than it has been in recent years and stated that he is blessed to have a job right now. In 2011, rumors began circulating that Burton could depart from the series due to contract negotiations. However, in May 2011 Burton announced via Twitter that he had re-signed with the series again. On August 23, 2012, Jamey Giddens of the website Daytime Confidential reported that contract negotiations were not going well and Burton was close to walking away from the series. On August 28, 2012, Burton confirmed in an interview with TV Guide's Michael Logan that he would exit the series and agreed to stay long enough for the producers to write his character out properly. Following the announcement that Sean Kanan (A. J. Quartermaine) was returning to the series in an undisclosed role, rumors began circulating that Kanan might be a recast of Jason. Kanan's resemblance to Burton fed into the rumors.

On September 2, 2014, executive producer Frank Valentini announced on Twitter that former All My Children and The Young and the Restless actor Billy Miller would join the cast as Jason. On September 30, 2014, Miller's air date as Jason was revealed to be on October 1.

In June 2017, it was announced that Burton would return to the series in an undisclosed role, later referred to as "Patient 6." In November 2017, it was announced that Burton had reprised the role of Jason, while Miller's casting was retconned to the character of Andrew Cain.

On November 23, 2021, Burton announced that he had been released from his contract due to failure to comply with the COVID-19 vaccine mandate. Burton filmed his last scenes on October 27 and made his final appearance as Jason on November 19.

On January 4, 2024, during the final moments of the primetime special General Hospital: 60 Years of Stars and Storytelling, it was announced Burton would reprise the role. On February 5, it was announced Burton was back on-set and would return during the March 4 episode. It was revealed on March 11, 2026 that Burton would be taking a hiatus from GH, with his last appearance being on March 25, 2026. However, Burton stated that he will be back on the soap by the summer of 2026.

=== Characterization ===
"I guess the writers started seeing something that was happening and they had the idea of making me a new character and basically starting from scratch. It has been a great journey for me as an actor and for me, personally."

— Burton on Jason Morgan

Steve Burton's early years on the soap as the "rich, wholesome preppy" Jason Quartermaine would come to a shocking, and dramatic end in 1995 after a car accident caused by his brother, A. J. leaves the character as a brain-damaged amnesiac. Following Jason's split from the Quartermaines, except for his sister Emily and grandmother Lila Morgan Quartermaine (Anna Lee), and a change of his surname to Morgan, he would become the right-hand man for mob boss, Sonny Corinthos (Maurice Benard). At the time, Burton was considering leaving the show and joked that a producer noted that he played every scene, the same way, as if someone was about to die. Burton's decision to stay stemmed from a conversation with Benard who gave him advice on how to improve. While still portraying Jason Quartermaine, the writers saw the chemistry between him and Benard and decided to create Jason Morgan.

"Am I a villain? I guess. If I kill people, then I guess I'm a villain. The audience knows that it's been done. But they don't care."

— Burton on his character's change in direction

With a new personality shift, Burton's Jason went from "preppy and wholesome" to "angry, stoic and emotionless." In the early stages of his transformation into Jason Morgan, he would experience fits of rage and was even given the nickname "anger boy." Post accident, as Jason matured the fits of rage subsided, Jason was very light and fun during his relationship with Robin Scorpio. It wasn't until after he was hurt multiple times that Jason grew darker and more intense. Jason was seen as "stone cold," and he didn't show much personality, unless it was with his closest loved ones. Despite the drastic change, Burton described his character as "vulnerable, caring, honest, and honorable" around those that he loves. Burton welcomed the change in story for his character, noting that it can sometimes become annoying playing "just plain nice" all the time. Within the mob and despite constant conflicts with law enforcement, Jason operated as a vigilante often taking down criminals who targeted the Corinthos family and tried to bring illegal substances and weapons into Port Charles, New York. Jason was known to show loyalty and compassion to those he held closest to him. His acts of extreme loyalty and compassion could be seen through his friendships with Sonny and Carly, his romantic relationships and his relationship with his nephew Michael, who he raised for the first year of Michael's life. The passing years also saw a thaw in Jason's relationship with the Quartermaines. The death of his father Alan and a shooting that left Michael in a year-long coma opened his eyes to what the Quartermaines experienced after his own accident. For that point on, Jason was shown to be more open to a relationship with his mother Monica, and eventually his grandfather Edward Quartermaine (John Ingle). The extent of the thaw with his family could also be seen through Jason's decision to name his son, Daniel Edward, after his grandfather.

== Storylines ==
=== 1980s ===
Jason was conceived out of his father, Alan Quartermaine's (Stuart Damon), affair with Susan Moore (Gail Ramsey). Jason was born at Our Lady of Mercy Hospital in New York City. When Jason was born, Alan supported him financially, but was fighting for custody of his other son, A.J. Jason lived with his mother and Scott Baldwin (Kin Shriner) up until her death, upon which he lived with Susan's aunt, Alice Grant (Lieux Dressler). Then he moved into the Quartermaine mansion with Alan. Alan's wife, Monica (Leslie Charleson), initially rejected Jason, but eventually grew to love him and later adopted him. Jason and A.J. were sent off to boarding school as children.

=== 1990s ===
When a newly SORASed Jason and older brother A.J. return to town, Jason, who is a successful student and athlete, is treated as the family favorite while A.J. is failing and dealing with alcoholism. Jason has relationships with Karen Wexler (Cari Shayne), Brenda Barrett (Vanessa Marcil), Robin Scorpio (Kimberly McCullough) and Keesha Ward (Senait Ashenafi). Jason supports Monica through her health crisis with breast cancer and adores his adoptive sister, Emily Quartermaine (then Amber Tamblyn). In December 1995, an intoxicated A.J. runs his car into a tree. Jason, who was attempting to stop A.J. from driving, is in the passenger seat and hits his head on a large boulder after being ejected from the car. Jason has brain injuries that result in total memory loss. Upon waking up from his coma, Jason had no recollection of his past and resented all of the Quartermaines except his grandmother Lila Quartermaine (Anna Lee) and sister Emily. His personality drastically changes. Jason eventually turns his back on his family, and changes his surname to Morgan, Lila's maiden name. Jason meets Robin again on a bridge and they begin a friendship which turns into a romantic relationship. Robin encouraged Jason to develop relationships with Lila, Emily, and Monica, and he stood by Robin at the Nurses Ball, where she shares with Port Charles for the first time that she is HIV positive. Robin leaves for college at Yale University, and Jason asks her friend Sonny Corinthos (Maurice Benard) for a job. His loyalty and hard work impress Sonny. Jason becomes Sonny's personal enforcer in his mob business. Robin returns in 1997 and was with Jason when he was shot for the first time by the Tin Man. Jason was operated on and saved. Robin begged Jason to leave his dangerous life behind. When Jason refused Robin begged Sonny to fire Jason. Initially hesitant, Sonny finally relented. Jason was infuriated when Sonny told him he was fired, and knew Robin was to blame. He and Robin broke up, and Robin made plans to leave town again. Jason met Robin on the bridge, and they said a last goodbye.

To help Carly Benson (then Sarah Joy Brown), Jason pretends to be the father of her baby. Carly develops postpartum depression after giving birth to her son, Michael, and leaves town. Robin returns to Port Charles and Jason confesses that the child is A.J.'s. Jason and Michael bond with Robin during Carly's absence. Dr. Tony Jones (Brad Maule) kidnaps Michael and Robin. Jason eventually rescues them both. At trial, Carly shoots Tony in a moment of temporary insanity and is remanded to a mental facility. In Carly's absence, Jason and Robin reunite. After Robin is almost killed in an explosion, Jason leaves the mob. Carly is released from the hospital, which puts a strain on Jason and Robin's relationship. Robin tells A.J. that he is Michael's father, and Jason temporarily loses custody of Michael. A.J. and Carly marry, and a judge awards joint custody to Jason, A.J. and Carly. Jason fears his hatred of A.J. will hurt Michael and signs away all rights; however, he remains an integral part of Michael's life. Jason comforts Elizabeth Webber (Rebecca Herbst) over the supposed death of her boyfriend, Lucky Spencer (Jonathan Jackson). Carly misunderstands their relationship, and sleeps with Sonny while Jason is shot during a confrontation with Anthony Moreno (Steve Inwood) and Joseph Sorel (Joe Marinelli). When Jason returns to Sonny's apartment, he discovers Carly's betrayal and runs out. Elizabeth finds an unconscious Jason in the snow, and enlists the help of Bobbie Spencer (Jacklyn Zeman) and Sonny, before sneaking him into her studio. Nikolas Cassadine (Tyler Christopher) sees Jason and Elizabeth together and accuses Elizabeth of moving on too quickly, prompting Elizabeth to lie and say that she and Jason are sleeping together before throwing Nikolas out. During his recuperation, Jason and Elizabeth are romantically drawn to each other, but a relationship is never established due to his conflicting feelings for Carly. When Jason recovers, he is still unable to deal with the betrayal of Sonny and Carly, and leaves town.

=== 2000s ===
Jason marries Brenda to avoid testifying against each other in a murder trial. They are cleared of the charges, and later get divorced. Soon after, Jason ends up falling in love with Sonny's sister, Courtney Matthews (Alicia Leigh Willis), and they begin a relationship, despite Sonny's disapproval. Courtney and Jason marry, but a miscarriage and the stress of the mob life tear them apart, and they annul their marriage. When Jason discovers that Sonny's mistress, Sam McCall (Kelly Monaco), is pregnant, he pretends to be the father of Sam's baby so Sonny will stay with his wife, Carly. The two bonded as the pregnancy advanced, and Sam wanted Jason to be a part of her baby's life. Sadly, Sonny and Sam's daughter is stillborn, but Jason helped Sam cope with the loss, and the two eventually fall in love and got engaged. When all three of Sonny's children are kidnapped, Jason and Sam rescue them from A.J., who is killed soon after. Jason takes a drug to remember A.J.'s killer, but later causes memory loss. Sam convinces Jason to go on an experimental drug that Robin finds, to help him regain his memory. The drug works but causes a brain aneurysm. They moved back to Hawaii where they plan to spend the last days of Jason's life. At Sam's urging, Jason later changes his mind, and has an operation that saves his life.

When Sam is shot and almost dies, Sam's mother Alexis Davis (Nancy Lee Grahn) guilts Jason into breaking up with Sam for the Summer of 2006. Jason later changes his mind, and tries to reconcile with her, but witnesses Sam sleeping with Ric Lansing (Rick Hearst). Jason goes home and Elizabeth shows up. They sleep together, and Elizabeth ends up pregnant. Elizabeth claims Lucky is the father, but later tells Jason the truth during the Metro Court hostage crisis. Elizabeth gives birth to a son, Jacob Martin Spencer. Sam finds out about Jake's paternity, and she and Jason began a 2-year break up. Jake's paternity is revealed to Lucky, but they agree to let Lucky be the father. Jason and Elizabeth start dating and get engaged, but when Michael is shot and left in a coma, Jason breaks up with Elizabeth. Jason ends up taking over Sonny's business after Sonny decides to leave the mob since it's too dangerous to his family. Sonny tries to rejoin the mob, but Jason prevents him access. Sonny tries to regain his power by marrying Claudia Zacchara (Sarah Joy Brown), daughter of rival mob boss Anthony Zacchara (Bruce Weitz).

When Jason's friend and trusted associate Damian Spinelli (Bradford Anderson) is set up and arrested for his illegal activities, Jason is forced to agree to a deal to gain Spinelli's freedom by getting Anthony arrested. The feds renege on their promise, and make Jason get Sonny arrested too, which Jason refuses. Spinelli is freed when Sam helps Jason destroy the evidence against him. Jason and Sonny reconcile, and Jason gives the business back. Michael wakes up from his year-long coma, and Jason suspects that Claudia is responsible for Michael's shooting. When Michael and Kristina Davis (Lexi Ainsworth) run away to Mexico, Sam and Jason track the siblings, but encounter Jerry Jacks (Sebastian Roché). Jason is shot and left to die by Jerry. Sam rescues Jason, and as she cares for him, the two reconnect. Jason and Sam find Michael and Kristina, and bring them back to Port Charles. He and Sam start dating again as lovers for the first time in two years. Jason and Sam find the proof they need to confirm Claudia's involvement in Michael's shooting. They hand it over to Sonny, who confronts Claudia. Cornered, Claudia takes a pregnant Carly hostage, and escapes. Michael ends up finding them before Jason and Sam can, and kills Claudia to protect Carly and his baby sister, Josslyn Jacks. To protect Michael, Jason covers up the crime and makes it look like Claudia disappeared.

=== 2010s ===
Jason is stalked by obsessed artist Franco (James Franco), who exposes Claudia's murder and gets Michael sent to prison. Jason makes a deal to go to prison to protect Michael, but they are both eventually released. After Jake dies in an accident, a grief-stricken Jason realizes how much he wants a family, and proposes to Sam; they get engaged, and marry soon after. During their honeymoon in Hawaii, Sam and Jason are drugged by Franco. He locks Jason in a room, and forces him to watch as he apparently rapes Sam. After returning to Port Charles, Jason kills Franco, but Sam finds out she's pregnant. A paternity test establishes Jason as the father. However, Sam is led to believe that Franco is Jason's fraternal twin brother. Another DNA test shows that Franco is the father, and Jason has a hard time accepting the news, separating the couple. Jason eventually tries to make amends with Sam the same night she gives birth to a baby boy, but they are led to believe her son died, and mourn the baby's death. Unknown to either, Sam's son was actually switched by Heather Webber (Robin Mattson) and Todd Manning (Roger Howarth) with the stillborn Victor Lord III. It's also revealed that Jason is the baby's father because Heather switched the second paternity test. The baby's "death" causes Jason and Sam's marriage to deteriorate, and they agree to divorce. Jason eventually figures out that the baby that died wasn't Sam's. He and Sam are eventually reunited with their son, whom they name Daniel Edward Morgan. That night, Jason is shot by Cesar Faison (Anders Hove), who kicks him into the water; Jason is presumed dead. Not long after he disappears, Sam finds out Jason is Danny's biological father.

Almost two years later, Jason was revealed to be alive, being held captive by Victor Cassadine (Thaao Penghlis). Victor gets Robin to revive Jason, then has him locked up to use his abilities. Jason manages to escape, only to be hit by a car. He is brought to General Hospital, and has multiple reconstructive surgeries to his face. Jason (Billy Miller) wakes up with amnesia, and is tended to by Elizabeth. He believes his name to be Jake. Helena Cassadine (Constance Towers) uses "Jake" through mind control to carry out her sinister plans. In the meantime, he and Elizabeth grow closer. When Jason is caught for his crimes, they find a chip inside his head that Helena uses to control him. Jason undergoes surgery to remove the chip, but still can't remember his real identity. Soon after, Hayden Barnes (Rebecca Budig) arrives, claiming to be "Jake's" wife, but she is exposed as a fraud. Elizabeth learns "Jake"'s identity, but keeps it a secret to pursue a relationship with Jason. Elizabeth and Jason's son, Jake, is found alive and being held captive by Helena. He is rescued, and returned to Elizabeth and Jason. "Jake" proposes to Elizabeth, and she accepts. He asks Sam for help to figure out his real identity. Spinelli and Carly figure out "Jake" is actually Jason. "Jake" finds out his true identity on his wedding day. Jason still can't remember his past, and decides to divorce Sam so he can marry Elizabeth. Sam figures out that Elizabeth knew who Jason was, and tells him. Heartbroken over her deception, Jason breaks up with Elizabeth.

While dealing with Jake's anger over his father leaving, Jason grows closer to Sam, and the two slowly start to rebuild their relationship. When Jake is almost hit by a car and Jason saves Sam from an explosion, the two eventually agree to start over. Sam asks Jason for a divorce, though, hoping to not pressure Jason into remembering their past. Jason reluctantly agrees. Soon after, Jason is in an accident, and ends up saving Dante Falconeri's (Dominic Zamprogna) life. While trying to rescue Dante, he starts having visions of Robin, Carly, Helena, Sam, and Sonny. Jason's memory finally returns, and he reconnects with his family and friends; despite reconnecting with Sonny, Jason decides not to go back into the mob for the sake of his family. Jason goes on the run with Sam when he is accused of murder. They find the evidence to clear Jason's name, and return to Port Charles. After returning, Sam found out that she was pregnant, and Jason was ecstatic; he proposed to Sam, and they remarried soon after. Jason investigated the car bombing that killed Morgan Corinthos (Bryan Craig), Sonny and Carly's son, in an attempt to clear Sonny's name. He teams up with Curtis Ashford (Donnell Turner), and they figure out the culprit was Olivia St. John (Tonja Walker), who was trying to kill Julian Jerome (William deVry). Jason ends up rescuing Sam after Olivia kidnaps her. Sam goes into labor, and Jason is forced to deliver their daughter, Emily Scout Morgan.

Jason tries to help Sonny leave the mob, but ends up getting shot in an ambush. He goes into a coma for several weeks. At the same time, a man known as "Patient 6" (Burton) is seen in Russia with Jason's original face. Patient 6 makes his way back to Port Charles, just as Jason wakes up. Patient 6 claims to be Jason, and is eventually believed to be the real Jason by many. Franco, proven to not be Jason's twin brother, reveals that Jason did have a twin brother named Andrew, but they do not know where he is. It's revealed that Andre Maddox (Anthony Montgomery) used Jason and Andrew as part of a memory-mapping experiment, putting Jason's memories into Andrew, making them both believe they're Jason. Andre reveals that Patient 6 is Jason, and the "other Jason" is his twin brother, Drew Cain (Billy Miller). Jason decides to find Faison, in hopes of figuring out why he and Drew were abducted. Meanwhile, he and Sam file for divorce, as she decides to stay with Drew. In March 2018, Jason and Sam are trapped together during an earthquake. In the aftermath of the quake, Jason and Sam admitted their feelings for each other. By March 23, 2018, Sam told Drew that she had feelings for Jason and they break up.

For the next several years, Jason spends his time reconciling with Sam and reconnecting with the rest of his family. However, Jason also promptly returns to work as Sonny’s enforcer.

=== 2020s ===
In 2020, after a bomb explodes at the Floating Rib, with Jason as the target, Sam fears the worst because Jason was supposed to be there with their son, Danny. Sam feels that she can no longer handle his line of work endangering their children. This culminates in December 2020 when Jason is about to embark on a manhunt with Sonny to track down Julian who planted the bomb to incriminate Cyrus, whom they know is behind it, and Sam gives Jason an ultimatum. If he leaves, then he mustn't come home. Jason leaves and joins up with Sonny. During this manhunt, Sonny is presumed dead when a bridge he is standing on collapses. 2021 starts with Jason and Carly searching for Sonny but when it seems like he really is gone, they need to focus on Sonny's business to keep the family safe. They set a meeting with the five families to make Jason's take-over official, but before the time for the meeting arrives, Cyrus Renault uses the murder of Franco by Peter August to frame Jason for murder. Carly, with the help of Brick, arranges for Jason to be stabbed in prison, and go to General Hospital in order to escape.

During the escape, Britt Westbourne (Kelly Thiebaud), who has been an ally against Cyrus, gets attacked by Cyrus's men, and Jason turns back to save her. He gets shot in the process. At the prepared safe house, Britt removes the bullet and gives him Carly's blood but the meeting with the five families are set for that evening and Carly ends up taking Sonny's seat at the table. Jason and Britt go on the run. Despite Britt commenting repeatedly about Jason's devotion to Carly, they end up having sex after Britt receives a devastating medical diagnoses. When Carly is forced to meet with Cyrus because Spinelli had been taken hostage, Jason rushes back to Port Charles. Carly had managed to get the witness, Gladys Corbin, to recant her testimony on Jason and implicate the real killer, while also brokering a deal with the authorities for immunity on some information Cyrus had on Sonny and Jason. This allows Jason to stop being on the run. The five families expect Jason to eliminate Carly and take back the business. They decide that getting married will be a powerful show of unity. Jason feels guilty for hurting Britt after promising to be there for her, but chooses to not tell her the real reason behind the marriage, instead admitting that even though he loved all the women he had been with, loving Carly is a part of him.

The morning of their wedding, Carly runs off to the building site that used to be the Floating Rib, and even earlier than that, Jakes, where she met Jason in 1996. Jason has Spinelli track her phone to find her and when she confesses that she is scared that she will fall for him again and then she will feel resentful and angry, and cannot have that between them, Jason asks her why she thinks that she will be falling alone. He confesses that his feelings for her is coming back. They decide to have a real marriage. Jason is at the church first, and when Michael asks him if he is ready to marry Carly, he answers that he has been ready for a long time. Jason and Carly gets married, saying their own vows to each other in front of family and friends, and both are happy and at peace with their decision. After arranging a car bomb for two heads of the give families with the help of Selina Wu, they head to their reception and later went back to Carly's house. When they are about to consummate their marriage, Sonny walks in. Jason decides to leave town in order to give Sonny and Carly space after admitting to Sonny that he was falling back in love with Carly. He heads to Crete with Britt to find her missing mother and his presumed dead twin, Drew Cain (Cameron Mathison).

In November 2021, during the mission in Crete, he engages in a shootout with Peter August (Wes Ramsey), the man who was responsible for his five-year disappearance. During the shootout, the tunnel that Jason and Peter are fighting underneath collapses. Jason presumably dies after he appears to be crushed by the rubble of the tunnel. However, Jason’s heroic last stand was not in vain. Through his sacrifice, Jason saves the lives of Drew, Britt and Liesl Obrecht (Kathleen Gati).

In March 2024, Jason is revealed to be alive, working with an operative to take out mob bosses, including Sonny. As Jason and his partner leave the scene, Dante Falconeri (Dominic Zamprogna) tries to stop them and Jason reveals himself, shocking Dante. However, Jason's partner shoots Dante twice in the chest, and when Jason refuses to leave Dante, his partner tries to kill him and Jason kills him before saving Dante's life. It's later revealed that Jason had been shot in the side, so he goes to Carly for help, and she is relieved to see him alive. As Carly patches Jason up, FBI agent Jagger Cates (Adam J. Harrington) and Anna arrive to search the house for Jason, since he's a suspect in not only trying to kill Sonny but for shooting Dante. Jason disappears and heads to the footbridge, but Jagger and Anna catch him, so he jumps off the bridge.

Jason then heads to the Quartermaine boathouse and collapses from his wound. When he wakes up, he shares a reunion with his son Danny, who is initially unhappy to see his father but agrees to help him. Danny then enlists Michael's help, along with Willow Tait (Katelyn MacMullen), to help keep Jason hidden and healthy. Jason explains to Michael that after the tunnel caved in, the escape path was blocked, so he made it to the beach, only to be captured by two men and put in a room with no windows. Jason reveals he's been working as a private military contractor for the past few years and his job is not finished, plus his boss has leverage over him.

It's later revealed that Jason has been working for Jagger as an FBI informant, in return for the FBI to not file charges of RICO violations and criminal conspiracy against Carly. After Jason turns himself in to clear his name over shooting Dante, Jagger privately confronts him, wondering what happened between the failed assassination attempt against Sonny and the time he turned himself in. Jason tells Jagger what happened, leaving out that he received help from Carly, Danny, Michael, and Willow. Jagger warns Jason that his cover was already blown, since Sonny had video surveillance footage of him and the sniper on the rooftop. He then threatens to use the leverage he has over Jason after warning him that if Dante dies, he gets charged with capital murder since Dante's real shooter was swept up by the extraction team after Jason killed him.

Anna later speaks to Jason, who confirms he didn't shoot Dante. Although she believes him, he refuses to speak, but after learning that "Agent Cates" is his old friend, Jagger, Jason, angry over being deceived, reveals he's been working for Jagger since November 2021. Jason is devastated when he learns from Anna that Britt was murdered back in 2022, but reveals the terms of the deal he made with the FBI and as part of his arrangement with Jagger, he's been working deep undercover to infiltrate a company called Pikeman to take them down, since Pikeman has been selling illegal weapons to rogue states flagged by the NSA. Since Pikeman has deep ties to the WSB, the FBI investigation couldn't be on the books and they couldn't use a federal agent; they needed a civilian to infiltrate Pikeman, especially since they promote from within. Jason reveals that he signed on as a military contractor to get to whoever's in charge, and confirms that Pikeman has been targeting Sonny. Jason explains that since he killed the sniper who shot Dante and since his body was swept up, he gets charged with capital murder if Dante dies. Anna urges Jason not to give up on Dante, and tells him that by saving Dante, he may have saved himself.

== Reception ==
Burton's portrayal of Jason Morgan earned him two Soap Opera Digest Awards for Outstanding Younger Lead Actor in 1997 and 1998. He was nominated for the 1997 Daytime Emmy Award for Outstanding Younger Actor in a Drama Series and won the 1998 Daytime Emmy Award for Outstanding Supporting Actor in a Drama Series. He also received a Daytime Emmy Award nomination for Outstanding Supporting Actor in 2000. He won two Soap Opera Digest Awards for Outstanding Supporting Actor in 2003 and Outstanding Actor in 2005. Also in 2005, he received a nomination for the Daytime Emmy Award for Outstanding Lead Actor in a Drama Series and in 2012 he received a pre-nomination for the Daytime Emmy Award for Outstanding Lead Actor in a Drama Series. With the 2014 casting of Billy Miller, Michael Fairman of On Air, On Soaps questioned: "Knowing now that Miller is taking on the role, do you think the Jason that comes to life after Robin revived him, will be a hitman, killer, or will he be Jason Quartermaine-esque or none of the above?"

In 2023, Charlie Mason from Soaps She Knows placed Jason eighth on his ranked list of General Hospital's 40+ Greatest Characters of All Time, commenting that "All it took was a big car wreck and a little brain damage, and Steve Burton's squeaky-clean future doctor was reborn as a Mob enforcer whose love of tight black T-shirts was rivaled only by his love of Sam. (And, depending on the year, Liz.)" The following year, Mason placed Jason 40th on his ranked list of Soaps' 40 Most Iconic Characters of All Time, commenting, "To think: If it wasn't for the car crash that left Steve Burton's character with brain damage and a black-T-shirt fixation, he might never have become the stone-cold hitman who leaves viewers red-hot".

== See also ==
- Jason Morgan and Sam McCall
- Jason Morgan and Elizabeth Webber
