= Soap Opera Update =

Magazine dedicated to the coverage of soap operas

Soap Opera Update was a magazine dedicated to the coverage of soap operas, co-founded by Angela Shapiro in 1988. The magazine was published every three weeks. It was purchased by Bauer Media Group in 1992. The magazine became popular on newsstands in the mid-1990s. However, due to a lack of subscriptions and promotion, and criticisms for mediocre content and "lazy" press coverage, the magazine was discontinued in late 2002. In 2006, the Update began issuing Soaps In Depth and releasing an annual issue to review the soaps of the past year and preview soaps for the new year.

This magazine also produced the Soap Opera Update Awards, similar to the Soap Opera Digest Awards.

== See also ==
- Soap Opera Digest
- Soap Opera Magazine
- Soap Opera Weekly
- Soaps In Depth
