= Love in the Afternoon (advertising campaign) =

Daytime TV soap promotion by the American Broadcasting Company

"Love in the Afternoon" was an advertising campaign used by ABC to market its soap operas in the form of newspaper advertisements and television commercials. Focusing on the highly tormented love lives of its main characters, "Love in the Afternoon" was the chief ad campaign for ABC's afternoon lineup from 1975 until 1985. The flagship programme for the campaign was General Hospital.

The idea of marketing soaps as "Love in the Afternoon" was not a unique concept, as rival network NBC had produced television advertisements promoting their popular couples under the "Love in the Afternoon" banner in 1974. ABC decided to pursue their own "Love in the Afternoon" advertisements when NBC abandoned their campaign.

== Background ==
Started by executive producer Jackie Smith, the "Love in the Afternoon" promos, for the majority of the campaign's decade-long run, featured a simulated sunrise against a blue sky, with the sun centering itself and then flashing to reveal the ABC logo zooming in against a different background. Individual show previews would then be seen, illustrating the many romantic, heated entanglements of the couples-du-jour, but sometimes highlighting non-romantic storylines. Usually two shows from the lineup would be previewed per promo, but it was not uncommon in the early 1980s for a third soap preview to be included. With the 1981–82 season, the graphic motif of the campaign was upgraded considerably, with the sunrise now appearing against a more generic blue background with silver and gold lines piercing through; the sun positions itself, and for the first time, flashes the word LOVE in capital letters to semi-title the campaign. The ABC lettering appears inside the "O" in LOVE. Also, between 1982 and 1985, game shows and daytime specials would be added on at the end of "Love in the Afternoon" promos, with their different tone used to book-end the dramatic scenes featured in the main parts of the promo.

There were also two different versions of the "Love in the Afternoon" musical jingle; the original being a slower, more melodious ditty with the lyrics "Fall in love...in the afternoon", and the later one, a slightly faster, uplifting piece, in which the chorus consisted of "Love in the afternoon". The latter was the best-known version used full-time from 1977 to 1985. However, the original version still turned up occasionally, as late as 1981.

== Success ==
The "Love in the Afternoon" campaign was only a moderate success in the late 1970s; it finally took off in 1980 and 1981 by advertising the wildly popular romance of Luke and Laura on General Hospital. The campaign also found success in promoting popular couples on another ABC serial, All My Children, such as Cliff and Nina, Greg and Jenny, and Jesse and Angie. Other shows profiled in "Love in the Afternoon" advertisements included One Life to Live, Loving, Ryan's Hope, and The Edge of Night.

In 1983, ABC briefly altered the "Love in the Afternoon" commercials to advertise "Loving in the morning," a nod to its then-new serial, Loving, which premiered in a late morning timeslot. After a few months, the regular "Love in the Afternoon" commercials resumed.

As the long-running campaign saw retirement in 1985, the network initially transitioned to a more modern replacement series of commercials using the slogan "Love it!", which coincided with ABC's 1985-86 network campaign You'll Love It.

Four decades after the commercials ended production, the phrase Love in the Afternoon has come to refer to the stories told on soap operas, irrespective of network affiliation.

== Trivia ==
A 1986 sketch on the children's television series Sesame Street was named "School in the Afternoon", a spoof of the "Love in the Afternoon" campaign. The sketch included four "promo" segments: The Edge of School (after The Edge of Night), Another School (Another World), All My Schoolchildren (All My Children) and Love of School (Love of Life).
