= Soap Opera Magazine =

Soap Opera Magazine was a weekly periodical devoted to interviews and recaps of American soap opera and was run for many years by American Media until the company, which had lost money for years, decided to cease publication of the magazine, focusing instead on their tabloid endeavors. It has since gone through a new digital transformation under new ownership.

The final issue was published on February 16, 1999. At that time, all customers who had existing Soap Opera Magazine subscriptions began receiving Soap Opera Digest instead.

== Digital relaunch ==
In 2023, the Soap Opera Magazine domain was acquired by Squid McGuffey Media LLC, which relaunched the brand as a digital publication under new ownership. The publication covers daytime television dramas including The Young and the Restless, The Bold and the Beautiful, General Hospital, Days of Our Lives, and Beyond the Gates, and distributes content through syndication platforms including MSN and NewsBreak. In February 2026, veteran daytime journalist Amber Sinclair was appointed editor-in-chief. In March 2026, the company filed a federal trademark application for the Soap Opera Magazine name with the United States Patent and Trademark Office, following the abandonment of all previous trademark registrations held by prior owners.

== See also ==
- Soap Opera Digest
- Soap Opera Update
- Soap Opera Weekly
- Soaps In Depth
