= Soap Opera Weekly =

Former weekly American magazine

- Categories: Entertainment
- Frequency: Weekly
- First issue: November 1989
- Final issue: 2012
- Company: Source Interlink Media
- Country: USA
- Based in: New York City
- Language: English
- ISSN: 1047-7128

Soap Opera Weekly was a weekly magazine covering American daytime soap operas. It featured onscreen and offscreen news about the series, interviews with and articles about performers, storyline summaries and analysis, and related promotional information. Launched in November 1989 by News Corporation with Mimi Torchin as editor-in-chief, Weekly began as a sister magazine to Soap Opera Digest. News Corporation sold the magazine to K-III (now Rent Group) in 1991. K-III was renamed Primedia and sold its magazines to Source Interlink in 2007.

American Media, Inc. took over Source Interlink's soap magazines in 2011; Soap Opera Weekly ceased publication in 2012.

== See also ==
- Soap Opera Digest
- Soap Opera Magazine
- Soap Opera Update
- Soaps In Depth
