= Soaps In Depth =

American soap opera magazine

- Editor-in-Chief: Dawn Owens
- Staff writers: Chris Eades; Amy Helmes; Julie McElwain; Michelle Moro Parkerton
- Categories: Entertainment
- Frequency: Biweekly (print; 1997–2020)
- Format: Digest (print; 1997–2020)
- Founder: Richard Simms
- First issue: January 1997; 29 years ago
- Final issue: December 1999 (NBC print edition); May 2020 (ABC and CBS print editions)
- Company: A360media
- Country: United States
- Language: English
- Website: SoapsInDepth.com
- ISSN: 1092-518X

Soaps In Depth was an American entertainment magazine, formerly published as a series of biweekly print publications and currently as an online-exclusive publication, that is dedicated to coverage of daytime soap operas. Founded in 1997 by Bauer Publications, it covers current and upcoming soap opera storylines, and features news and feature articles, interviews with performers and principal production staff, and, as a print publication, crossword puzzles.

Differentiating from other soap opera-focused magazines (like Soap Opera Digest) that offered general coverage of all of the daytime serials, Soaps In Depth was initially structured as three standalone biweekly publications—ABC Soaps In Depth, CBS Soaps In Depth and NBC Soaps In Depth—that were devoted to only the soap operas on a particular "Big Three" network covered by the corresponding edition, allowing soap viewers to receive more coverage related to the soaps they followed.

The NBC edition was discontinued in December 1999 after the network cancelled two of its three soap operas within months of each other, Another World and Sunset Beach, making it superfluous to cover only two programs (Days of Our Lives and AW successor Passions respectively); coverage of NBC's serials was integrated into the other publications. The ABC and CBS editions continued to be sold for 21 years afterward, even after both networks pared down the number of soaps occupying their respective daytime schedules between 2009 and 2012, leaving ABC with only one serial (General Hospital) and CBS with two (The Young and the Restless and The Bold and the Beautiful).

In April 2020, it was announced that Soaps in Depth would cease production of its print magazine but would continue to publish newer content as an online-only publication; the conversion left Soap Opera Digest as the only remaining American soap opera magazine to provide content through both print publication and online distribution.

== Editions ==
=== CBS Soaps In Depth ===
First published in early 1997, at the time print publication ceased, CBS Soaps In Depth had focused only on the CBS soaps The Bold and the Beautiful and The Young and the Restless. Previously, Guiding Light and As The World Turns were covered as well before their respective cancellations (in 2009 and 2010). Each issue also included a special section for Days of Our Lives, brief news coverage, previews, and recaps for General Hospital and Days Of Our Lives. When the CBS edition debuted, each issue cost $2.99. By the publication's closure, the CBS edition cost $3.99 American and $4.50 Canadian.

=== ABC Soaps In Depth ===
First published in February 1997, this magazine focused on the ABC soaps at that time (All My Children, The City, General Hospital, and One Life to Live). One month after the release of the debut issue, ABC cancelled The City; ABC Soaps In Depth later coverage began on its replacement, Port Charles, when the General Hospital spin-off premiered in June with coverage of PC continuing until the series was cancelled in 2003. The ABC edition also includes news coverage, previews, and recaps for the CBS soaps and Days of our Lives. The magazine initially cost $2.99 per issue, with occasional issues sold at a discount to $1.00; beginning in 2003, each issue cost $3.99.

After the cancellations of AMC and OLTL in 2011 and 2012, respectively (leaving GH as the ABC's only remaining daytime soap, a status it maintains to this day), the ABC edition began to also include brief sections for NBC's Days of Our Lives and the CBS soaps.

=== NBC Soaps In Depth ===
NBC Soaps In Depth focused its coverage on NBC Daytime's soap line-up, then consisting of Another World, Days of Our Lives, and the fledgling Sunset Beach. Two of the soaps covered by the NBC edition were cancelled within a span of several months during 1999: NBC first cancelled the long-running AW to make room for the in-house production Passions and subsequently canned Sunset Beach due to low ratings (electing to replace it with Later Today, a lifestyle talk show developed as an extension of Today); although the network continued to maintain two serials thereafter (until Passions moved to The 101 Network in 2008 to accommodate a fourth hour of Today, leaving Days as NBC's only remaining serial), the consequence of NBC Daytime's drastic moves led Bauer Publications to determine a separate NBC-focused magazine was no longer feasible.

Coverage of Days of our Lives and, until its cancellation, Passions (consisting of news and feature articles, previews, and recaps for each show) was folded into the ABC and CBS editions; at the time Soaps in Depth ended print distribution, Days received more coverage in the ABC edition, as ABC itself only has one soap opera remaining on its daytime schedule (General Hospital).

== Features ==
=== Recurring articles ===
Each issue consists of recurring columns which may touch on any of the respective network soaps:

- News - Updates on important news stories.
- Ins and Outs - Updates on cast changes.
- Set Your DVR - Previews for the coming two weeks.
- On the Town - Candid photos of stars at events, parties, award ceremonies, and actors/actresses who may be doing a Broadway show.
- In Depth Cover Story - Major plot development coming up on a particular show, with sporadic Cover Stories for each show.
- Hottest Stories - Upcoming plot developments in popular storylines.
- We Speak Out - The editors' opinions on storylines.
- Readers' Poll - Results of poll questions asked in a recent issue, as well as top couples, actors, and actresses.
- In Depth Answers - Fan questions answered.
- Primetime Soaps In Depth - Feature interviews about current Primetime shows.
- Gold Star - An award for a top performance by an actor.
- Standout Scene - Recap and acknowledgement of a particularly powerful scene.
- Star Talk - Question asked by the magazine for the actors and actresses.
- Storyline Recaps - Article explaining major storyline twists that occurred in the last two weeks.
- Soap Style - Brief articles about what an actress (and sometimes actor) wore to an event.
- In the Next Issue - Previews of articles in the upcoming issue.

=== Rotating articles ===
Each issue contains a number of alternating columns which may not appear every week:

- Keeping Track - Catching up with an actor or actress who formerly appeared on a current soap.
- Old Friends - Catching up with an actor or actress who appeared on a now-defunct soap.
- Flashback - Soap actors and actresses reflecting on their former characters.
- Take This Job And Love It! - A Q&A with actors over their favorite aspects of their jobs.
- A Minute of Your Time Please - A quick-hit Q&A asking questions of an actor in 60 seconds.
- Studio In Depth - Fun candid photos at a Soaps In Depth photo shoot.
- Beauty Secrets - Fashion and beauty questions asked by the fans, as well as questions for the actors, asked by the magazine.
- Wedding Album - Photos and memories from popular soap weddings.
- Special features which look at storylines, characters or couples across the soaps, usually grouped together under a specific theme for the issue.

=== Show sections ===
All three soaps in the CBS edition and ABC edition have their own special sections, mostly scoops from cast members, writers, or executive producers. These include:

- In Depth sections for each show - these include special features such as:
  - Feature Interviews
  - Behind the Scenes
  - On the Road
  - Off-Duty

There are also several special articles for each show. These include:

- Farewell sections for an actor or actress who may leave a show.
- Daytime Emmy coverage from the awards ceremony.
- End of Year Recaps/Milestones.
- A special section may also appear whenever a soap or actor reaches a big anniversary.

== See also ==
- Soap Opera Digest
- Soap Opera Magazine
- Soap Opera Update
- Soap Opera Weekly
