= Dante Falconeri =

Fictional character from General Hospital

- General Hospital character
- Portrayed by: Dominic Zamprogna
- Duration: 2009–present
- First appearance: June 22, 2009
- Created by: Robert Guza, Jr.
- Introduced by: Jill Farren Phelps (2009); Frank Valentini (2018–2020)
- Book appearances: The Secret Life of Damian Spinelli
In-universe information
- Other names: Dante Angelo Falconeri; Dominic Pirelli
- Occupation: WSB agent (2018–2021); Police detective (2010–2018, 2021–present); Police commissioner (since 2025)
- Parents: Sonny Corinthos; Olivia Falconeri
- Stepparents: Ned Quartermaine
- Siblings: Michael Corinthos (adoptive); Morgan Corinthos; Kristina Davis; Lila McCall; Leo Falconeri; Avery Corinthos; Donna Corinthos
- Spouse: Lulu Spencer (2011–2016, 2016–2019)
- Children: Gio Palmieri; Rocco Falconeri
- Grandparents: Mike Corbin
- Aunts and uncles: Ric Lansing
- Nieces and nephews: Wiley Cooper-Jones; Amelia Corinthos; Daisy Gilmore
- First cousins: Molly Lansing; Spencer Cassadine

Dante Falconeri is a fictional character from General Hospital, an American soap opera on the ABC network, played by Dominic Zamprogna. Zamprogna made his debut on June 22, 2009. In 2018, Zamprogna announced his decision to leave the role, and departed on June 28, 2018; he later returned for a one-off episode on November 12, 2018. In 2019, he again reprised the role from March 15 to March 29. The following year, he returned in a full-time capacity.

Under executive producer Jill Farren Phelps and head writer, Robert Guza, Dante is introduced to the series as an undercover cop investigating mob boss, Sonny Corinthos, who happens to be his father. In addition to his initial investigation of Sonny, Dante's most significant stories include his romance with Lulu Spencer, his unintentionally landing his brother Michael in prison, his past relationships with Brook Lynn Ashton and Brenda Barrett, and his friendship with Ronnie Dimestico.

In 2011, Dante and Lulu are married and under executive producer Frank Valentini and head writer Ron Carlivati, the couple embarks on a journey to have a child. However, they are forced to utilize Maxie Jones as a surrogate which ends in them losing custody of another child which proves to be Maxie's own. It is then revealed that Dante and Lulu's embryo was stolen and birthed by Dr. Britt Westbourne. The couple is eventually reunited with their son whom they name Rocco. In 2013, in honor of General Hospital's 50th anniversary celebration, Dante and Lulu are featured in a revisit of the iconic 1980s storyline, known as the Ice Princess, the original of which featured Lulu's legendary supercouple parents, Luke and Laura.

Zamprogna's performance has been met with critical acclaim, having garnered him Daytime Emmy Award nominations for Outstanding Supporting Actor in a Drama Series in 2014, 2016 and 2019. He ascended and earned a nomination for Outstanding Lead Actor in a Drama Series in 2021.

== Character creation ==
=== Background ===
In September 2008, the series introduced Lisa LoCicero as Olivia Falconeri, the streetwise cousin of Kate Howard (aka Connie Falconeri), played by Megan Ward. Kate is the fiancée of Maurice Benard's Sonny Corinthos. Rumors began to circulate that the character of Olivia and Sonny would share a past. LoCicero confirmed that the rumors were true and it was revealed that Olivia and Sonny dated briefly before he dated Connie. LoCicero said that when Sonny invites Olivia to his and Kate's impending nuptials, "[Sonny] doesn't know there was quite a rivalry between the two women or that Olivia has something under her belt that’s going to create big excitement-and a lot of friction." In mid September, spoilers hinted that Olivia had a major secret that was set to be revealed very soon. On October 3, 2008, viewers learn of Olivia's son, Dante Angelo Falconeri during a phone conversation. At the end of the episode, a delirious Kate admits to Dr. Patrick Drake (Jason Thompson) that Dante is actually Sonny's son. Olivia gives birth to Dante in 1984 and swears Connie to secrecy while leading the entire neighborhood to believe that she is very promiscuous and has no idea who the child's father is.

=== Casting ===
The series put out a casting call for the character and newcomer Nathan Parsons auditioned for the role. However, Parsons was cast in the role of Ethan Lovett instead. In September 2008, Soap Opera Weekly reported that the role could go to former Guiding Light star, Tom Pelphrey. It was speculated that ABC's offer to an actor of Pelphrey's caliber for the role of Dante was allegedly in response to possible departure of longtime leading man, Steve Burton who portrayed Jason Morgan. TV Guide alleged that the rumor was planted by the network to scare Burton into resigning with the series. By October 2008, Soap Opera Weekly reported that another Emmy winner, David Lago, known for his role as Raul Guittierez on The Young and the Restless had been cast in the role. Lago's first airdate was tentatively set for late November. Upon the announcement, it was reported the Pelphrey had turned down the role. However, by December ABC still had not confirmed Lago's casting and it was believed that actors were still auditioning for the role. In January 2009, Soap Central reported that ABC was prepared to make a decision between Lago and Pelphrey for the role. Meanwhile, Pelphrey relocated to California which fueled speculation that he had been cast in the role. However, Pelphrey then issued a statement admitting that he was looking for work outside of daytime making Lago the lead candidate for the role of Dante. A member of the casting department also revealed that the casting could be held off. In May 2009 it was announced that Pelphrey would return to Guiding Light to help usher it off the air and it was rumored that the role was being held for him, despite conflicting reports that the once suspended casting call had been reactivated. According to Soap Central, ABC was unable to cast the actor they initially wanted in the role, but the network refused to comment on their initial idea for casting. The delayed casting led to reintroduction of Sonny's other son, Michael. Lago later revealed that he was never contacted by the series, but he was definitely open to it. Pelphrey revealed in an interview that he had been contacted by ABC, but he turned down the role.

In late May 2009, Soapnet reported that Dominic Zamprogna was set to join the cast of the soap in the mysterious role of Dominic. Soap Opera Digest confirmed the news and confirmed that the Canadian actor's first air date was June 22, 2009. Zamprogna revealed in an interview that his manager told him about the role; he filmed the audition and sent to the casting director, Mark Teschner. Teschner loved the tape and sent it to the producers. A week later, the producers had Zamprogna fly to Los Angeles to read with Maurice Benard, and they immediately offered him a contract. Teschner remembered Zamprogna from when he auditioned for role of Juan Santiago about 10 years earlier, a role that went to Michael Saucedo.

=== Departure and guest returns (2018–2019) ===
In June 2018, Zamprogna announced his decision to depart the role of Dante. In a statement, he said: "I feel I owe it to you awesome fans to tell you that I've taped my final scenes.". Zamprogna last appeared on June 28, 2018. Zamprogna returned in a guest capacity for a special one-off episode, centered around a "What If?" scenario concerning Benard's Sonny; the episode aired on November 12, 2018. In February 2019, it was announced that Zamprogna would once again return to the soap for a short-term period of time. He returned on March 15, 2019. He left again on March 29, 2019.

=== Return (2020) ===
In May 2020, Zamprogna disclosed to Soaps In Depth that he was "ready to come home," and had opened discussion to return to the role with executive producer Frank Valentini. In July of the same year, it was announced that Zamprogna would return to the role; returning during the August 3, 2020 episode.

=== Characterization ===
Zamprogna, on playing Dominic (a.k.a. Dante)

It's just interesting to play a character like that when there's a lot of tough guys on the canvas. I think this is a new, fresh take on [tough guys]…

— Soapnet

According to the initial casting call, the character of Dante is "charming and flirtatious" with and abundantly arrogant, much like his father. Zamprogna initially described the character as a "smart, intelligent, loving kind of thug." The character is also written as very "witty," and "funny." He is almost fearless. "He's putting himself in front of people that could pull out a gun and shoot him right there." However, the character's fearless attitude is what makes the other character's respect him. Zamprogna continued, "[Dante]'s gutsy" but not the typical "tough guy." The character is also very loyal to his family, and he is always "quick on his feet" said Zamprogna. Dante has a strong stance on morality that is very "black and white." For him, there are no "grey areas." Of his character, Zamprogna said that even when Dante is working undercover, "He's real. No BS."

== Development ==
The character's onscreen introduction was very ambiguous due to the fact that he is introduced as Dominic, hired by Claudia Zacchara (Sarah Brown) to carry one of her ill-conceived schemes. It was also spoiled ahead of time that Zamprogna's character would share scenes opposite Sonny's daughter, Kristina Davis (Lexi Ainsworth) which leads to speculation that he could be a potential love interest. Dan J. Kroll spoiled that Zamprogna's Dominic was actually Dante ahead of the on-air reveal on July 8, 2009. Zamprogna said he made a conscious effort to make sure that there wasn't a huge difference between Dante and his undercover persona, Dominic, besides the names. When it comes time to arrest Sonny, Dante feels conflicted and though he has grown to like Sonny, he knows his actions are going to destroy many lives. Dante doesn't want to like Sonny because he does not want to be compared to him, however "Dante kind of sees himself as the same type of guy," Zamprogna said in an interview with On-Air On-Soaps. The only real difference between Sonny and Dante is that they are on opposite sides of the law. According to Zamprogna, Dante understands he has a job to do but he wants to hold off the arrest to give Sonny and family time to share one more happy moment. Despite the fact that he knows Sonny will kill him when he goes to arrest him, Dante still struggles with what he has to do. According to an interview Zamprogna did with ABC.com, Dante is completely torn after the shooting when he realizes that not only has he found his father, but that his father is the man he hates. It's a "double-edged sword" Zamprogna stated; Dante is "mortified" to learn of their biological connection. The revelation changes the "pace" of the storyline and also changes the "mentality in the character." The reveal also sets the stage for a potential rivalry between Dante and Michael. While Michael finds ways to screw up his life, Dante as Dominic has gotten into Sonny's inner circle, where Michael so desperately wants to be. On top of that, Dante takes Michael's place as Sonny's oldest child. It is his experience in Port Charles that helps Dante to understand that things are not always as they seem. Though Dante's stance on morality does not change, Zamprogna wanted to develop Dante enough to have him look past his hatred for Sonny. For example, when Sonny is arrested for shooting Johnny Zacchara (Brandon Barash), Dante actually believes Sonny when he claims self-defense.

== Storylines ==
Dominic Pirelli arrives in town and immediately ingratiates himself to mob boss Sonny Corinthos (Maurice Benard) when he saves his life during an ambush and rescues his son Morgan (Aaron Refvem). He also becomes smitten with Lulu Spencer (then Julie Marie Berman) much to the dismay of her brothers Lucky (Greg Vaughan) and Ethan (Nathan Parsons). Meanwhile, it is revealed that Dominic is actually Dante, an undercover cop. On Sonny's orders, Dante teams up with his mother's boyfriend, Johnny Zacchara (Brandon Barash) to destroy a drug shipment and ends up getting arrested. Dante gets himself released after he clues the PCPD in on his investigation of Sonny. Jasper Jacks (Ingo Rademacher) discovers Dante's identity and urges him to arrest Sonny sooner. Dante confesses his identity to Lulu when she gets trapped in the freezing water beneath the Zacchara mansion in an attempt to keep her alive. Meanwhile, Dante is furious with his childhood mentor, Ronnie Dimestico when he learns that Ronnie aided the release of the crazed serial killer/artist Franco (James Franco) when Dante arrested him; Franco later kidnaps Lulu forcing Dante to rescue her.

In January 2010, Dante's attempt to arrest Sonny ends with him getting shot. Dante is shocked to learn Sonny is his father, but instead of turning Sonny in for shooting him, he decides to send him to prison for killing his wife, Claudia Zacchara (Sarah Joy Brown). Dante is shocked to learn that Sonny was covering for Michael and his persistence lands Michael in prison. With the whole world against them, Dante and Lulu grow closer. Meanwhile, Carly Corinthos Jacks' (Laura Wright) attempt at getting revenge on Dante for sending her son Michael to prison culminates in Lulu catching Brook Lynn Ashton (Adrianne León) with a drugged Dante. In the summer of 2010, Dante's past with Brenda Barrett (Vanessa Marcil) comes to light and drives a wedge between himself and Lulu. Dante and Lulu eventually reconcile as her father Luke Spencer (Anthony Geary) goes on a drunken binge following his accidental hit and run of his grandson Jake Spencer. Lulu follows him to Florida forcing Dante to go after her. When the owner of the bordello Lulu is working at discovers Dante is a cop, he attempts to rape Lulu, and Dante saves her. Upon their return to Port Charles, the couple moves in together. On the night he is about to propose, Dante gets shot covering a shift for the drug addicted Lucky (Jonathan Jackson) making Lulu rethink marriage. They eventually get past the fear and decide to marry in his hometown of Brooklyn. In 2012, Sonny stops Dante from getting shot. Meanwhile, Dante and Lulu begin working together when she suspects Ronnie of attacking strippers in Port Charles. Ronnie kidnaps Lulu and attempts to kill her and frames Dante in the process. With assistance from John McBain (Michael Easton), Dante is able to rescue Lulu and Ronnie is killed. When Olivia begins having LSD induced visions, she sees Lulu pregnant. The couple begins trying to conceive and Lulu learns she can't carry to term. Lulu's best friend Maxie Jones (Kirsten Storms) agrees to be their surrogate. In March 2013, as the couple celebrates the first sonogram with their parents, including Lulu's mother Laura Spencer (Genie Francis), Lulu (now Emme Rylan) is abducted. Luke and Laura believe their old rival Helena Cassadine (Constance Towers) to be behind the disappearance. The group tracks Helena down and a shootout ends in her death. At the Cassadine family compound in Greece, Dante finds Lulu cryogenically frozen thank to Stavros Cassadine (Robert Kelker-Kelly) who has become obsessed with her. Dante, Luke and Laura manage to free an amnesiac Lulu and after much persistence, Lulu regains her memories. The couple then prepares for the birth of their baby.

In early 2015, having been made aware of Luke's recent behavior thanks to Ned Ashton (Wally Kurth), Dillon Quartermaine (Robert Palmer Watkins) returns to Port Charles to check up on Tracy Quartermaine (Jane Elliot) and reluctantly gives his support to Tracy and Luke's most recent engagement. Dillon also reconnects with Lulu and meets her husband Dante. Valerie Spencer (Brytni Sarpy) comes to Port Charles with her mother (Dee Wallace) and Lulu. Valerie finds herself having a crush on Date. As she tries to control her emotions, it gets harder. In mid 2015, Dillon and Lulu also both travel to Canada to help her parents Luke and Laura (Anthony Geary and Genie Francis) and Holly Sutton (Emma Samms) rescue Lulu's brothers Lucky Spencer (Jonathan Jackson) and Ethan Lovett (Nathan Parsons), after they were both kidnapped by mobster and Luke's old enemy Frank Smith (Joseph Cortese). During this time, Dante thinks Lulu has cheated on him with Dillon. Valerie has a crush on Dante. Following her mother's death, Valerie takes refuge with her cousin Lulu her husband Dante. Valerie also starts working as the police administrative aid for the police station. Stricken with grief, Valerie bonds with Dante who was also raised by a single mother and they eventually have a one-night stand. Dante confides in Nathan West (Ryan Paevey.) Valerie briefly dates Lulu's ex-lover Dillon. She eventually confides in him only for Dillon who is still hung up on Lulu to publicly expose the affair at a halloween party. Dante and Lulu cannot overcome all that has happened so they agree to divorce. In 2016, they decided to not sign the divorce papers and give their marriage a second chance by going to couple's therapy. Following their reconciliation, the couple move into a new home, and begin discussions of having a second child together. In December, Dante and Lulu meet Lulu's daughter Charlotte Cassadine with Valentin Cassadine (James Patrick Stuart). In June 2018, Dante leaves Port Charles to join the WSB in finding Raj Patel, the man who attacked and attempted to kill Lulu two years prior.

In March 2019, Sonny goes undercover to find Dante, bringing him to Turkey, where they work together to escape, resulting in Dante killing Raj in self-defense. When Dante returns home and reunites with his family, he begins showing signs of PTSD with nightmares and episodes, even going as far as attempting to pull a knife on Jason Morgan (Steve Burton) without realizing it. Dante leaves Port Charles and Lulu files for divorce, which he does not contest. The following year, Dante is seen in a WSB Facility in Switzerland. He is released in September to take down Peter August (Wes Ramsey). It's later revealed that Liesl Obrecht (Kathleen Gati) is the one who arranged for Dante to be released, and it's also revealed that she ordered Dr. Kirk (Christopher Cousins) to brainwash Dante into completing the mission.

In March 2021, following Peter's exposure, Obrecht activates Dante's programming and orders him to kill Peter. After she leaves, Dante lures Peter down to the cemetery, and aims a gun at him once he arrives. Dante almost kills Peter, but Sam McCall (Kelly Monaco) arrives just in time to stop him. After Peter gets away, Dante realizes that he's not recovered like he thought he was, and realizes he needs some help. Sam promises to get him some help, so she takes him to the hospital to see Kevin Collins (Jon Lindstrom). Kevin is able to successfully deprogram Dante, so Dante can finally move on. In May, Dante decides to rejoin the PCPD.

== Reception ==
Despite critics like Nelson Branco of TV Guide, and Sarah Brown who portrayed Claudia lobbying for Tom Pelphrey to get the job, Zamprogna won the role. TV Source magazine urged Pelphrey to take the role before it was filled. Dominic Zamprogna ranked at #1 on "Daytime Confidential's Top 10 Soap Newcomers of 2009." The list referred to the role as one of the most sought after roles in the past 10 years. The article continued and commented that not only was Zamprogna "a man who resembled Benard in stature and mannerisms, but more importantly could act his sexy behind off!" The post applauded the actor for selling every part of his storyline and said that Zamprogna was proof that being well known as an actor did not determine whether you made an impact. Jamey Giddens praised Zamprogna for his performance during the scene in which Dante confronted Sonny and tried to arrest him in January 2010 and said the performance solidified Zamprogna's place at the top of the newcomer list. Giddens also referred to him as a "Superstar-in-the-Making." Daytime Confidential's Perkie said the scene in which Dante confronted Sonny gave them goose bumps and referred to Zamprogna's performance as "mesmerizing." The scene was also spoofed on by Stephen Colbert on his late night talk show, The Colbert Report in July 2010.
