= Valerie Spencer =

Fictional character from General Hospital

- General Hospital character
- Paulina Lule as Valerie Spencer
- Portrayed by: Brytni Sarpy (2015–2019); Paulina Lule (2019–2020)
- Duration: 2015–2020
- First appearance: March 20, 2015
- Last appearance: September 1, 2020
- Created by: Ron Carlivati
- Introduced by: Frank Valentini
- Brytni Sarpy as Valerie Spencer
In-universe information
- Occupation: Police detective; Police officer; Police administrative aide
- Family: Spencer
- Mother: Pat Spencer
- Grandparents: Tim Spencer; Lena Eckert
- Aunts and uncles: Luke Spencer; Bobbie Spencer
- First cousins: Carly Corinthos; Lucky Spencer; B.J. Jones (adoptive); Ethan Lovett; Lucas Jones (adoptive); Lulu Spencer

Valerie Spencer is a fictional character from General Hospital, an American soap opera on the ABC network, portrayed by Brytni Sarpy from 2015 to 2019 and Paulina Lule from 2019 to 2020. Introduced as the niece of the legendary Luke Spencer (Anthony Geary), Valerie is the daughter of the late Pat Spencer (Dee Wallace). Upon losing her mother, Valerie relocates to Port Charles and moves in with her cousin, Lulu Spencer (Emme Rylan), and bonds with her husband Dante Falconeri (Dominic Zamprogna). The two end up having a one-night stand, only for Dante to reconcile with Lulu and Valerie briefly dates Lulu's ex-boyfriend Dillon Quartermaine (Robert Palmer Watkins).

== Development ==
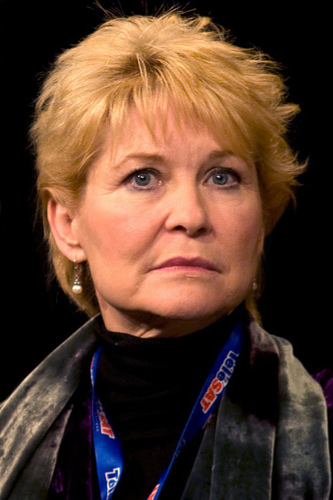
Scream queen Dee Wallace, best known for her appearance in the 1982 Steven Spielberg film E.T. the Extra-Terrestrial, portrayed Valerie's late mother Pat Spencer whom Valerie spends most of her life caring for because of her illness.

=== Casting and creation ===
"That's my favorite part of being Valerie, that Spencer is at the end of her name. I'm so honored to be a part of a legacy family. It's incredibly humbling."

— Sarpy on Valerie being a Spencer.

Brytni Sarpy originated the role of Valerie Spencer on March 20, 2015. Sarpy had auditioned for the series several times over the years. The actress first auditioned for the short lived role of Taylor DuBois in the spring of 2013. While Sarpy made it through the casting process, she was ultimately too old for the role of the 16-year-old Taylor. In late 2013, Sarpy auditioned for the role of Jordan Ashford—for which she was too young because Sarpy would have been playing mom to a teenager. However, Sarpy made an indelible impression on the casting department. Sarpy was sure she'd land in daytime because she had actually auditioned several times for NBC's Days of Our Lives. "I kind of knew it was going to be one or the other" the actress said to Soap Opera Digest.

In January 2015 the series put out a casting call for a "beautiful," "dynamic", and "charismatic" African American actress in her 20s for a contract role due begin taping in late February. When Sarpy returned to audition for the role of Valerie with casting director Mark Teschner despite the lack of information in the original casting call. Sarpy described the casting process for Valerie as "pretty quick" because within the next few days, she had a callback with some of the producers, including executive producer Frank Valentini. She then screen tested the following Monday and within "a week and a half," Sarpy had booked the role making General Hospital the actress's first major professional gig. Sarpy admitted that finding the "right" roles had been difficult, "but the role of Valerie Spencer, was effortless for me." Head writer Ron Carlivati explained that with the introduction of Valerie's mother Pat (Dee Wallace) as the long lost Spencer sibling, the writers questioned if a new character of that age could "have an ongoing purpose on the canvas?" And out of those discussions came the character of Valerie. Carlivati thought, "why go to all that trouble just to kill of Pat?" Valerie's survival after Pat's departure "made it more interesting to [the writers] and brought it into the present."

In December 2016, Sarpy was downgraded to recurring basis. In February 2019, it was announced that Sarpy had joined the cast of The Young and the Restless. On March 28, 2019, it was announced that Paulina Lule had been cast in the role of Valerie, and had already had her first day on-set; she made her first appearance on April 23, 2019. Lule made her final appearance on September 1 of the following year.

=== Characterization ===
Sarpy explained that Valerie would "always" be defined by her relationship with her mother. While it wasn't originally scripted, Valerie's introduction immediately answers the question about her being biracial. Sarpy said "We felt it was important to answer the question of Valerie's mixed ethnicity head on." During an interview with Soap Opera Digest, Sarpy revealed that she and Valerie actually have several similarities. Like Valerie, Sarpy also has a diverse ethnic background and was primarily raised by a single parent—her father, while Valerie was raised by her mother. Valerie is her mother's caretaker during her battle with Multiple sclerosis while Sarpy's father Mel has Parkinson's disease. "The way Valerie took care of her mother, I definitely related to it." Because of this, Valerie possess a certain "maternal quality." Sarpy said her character's iconic heritage speaks for itself. "Valerie is a Spencer through and through." She described Valerie as a "passionate" "go-getter" who "wears her heart on her sleeve." Valerie has "hero qualities" and is a "good girl." Valerie is a "fighter" Sarpy declared. She is very "sincere." Sarpy further described Valerie as being "strong" and "courageous." Sarpy also characterized Valerie as being very "conscientious." "She's a moral character so she cares about what she's doing." Though she loves her mom, Valerie didn't have much time to live her own life because she was devoted to Pat.

=== Introduction ===
The character's introduction is far from a gradual one but said the character brings a "new energy to the Spencer clan." Legendary anti-hero Luke Spencer (Anthony Geary) has suffered a severe breakdown which his family has linked to his childhood which he never discusses. The Spencer family goes seeking out Luke's estranged older sister Pat Spencer—and instead find her daughter, Valerie—who is immediately thrust into the middle of the drama. Upon her introduction, Valerie struggles to find her place in Port Charles and in her family because it is all so unfamiliar to her and she doesn't have Pat by her side. Still suffering through the trauma of losing her mother, Valerie struggles to find her place in town and in the ranks of her iconic family because it is all so unfamiliar to her. "She's come in with quite a lot on her plate" Sarpy said. However, the circumstances of her introduction makes for a lot of "raw emotion and character development" Sarpy explained.

=== Relationships ===
After losing her mother, Valerie develops an immediate connection with Dante Falconeri (Zamprogna), who is married to her cousin Lulu (Rylan). Sarpy said that Dante and Valerie's relationship is "very nurturing" and he stands up for her in way that no one else does. They also share a kindred spirit because of them were raised by single mothers. Dante has a "soft spot" for her and Valerie needs really needs that when they first meet. Sarpy insisted that Valerie's intentions were pure. The series immediately hinted at the possibility of Dante and Valerie's relationship causing trouble for Dante and Lulu. The two eventually have a one-night stand and Sarpy said it "adds layers to her character" and makes for great drama. However, Dante and Valerie's relationship isn't "over sexualized" and they never intended to hurt anyone. Sarpy admitted that she saw the story coming because she auditioned opposite Dominic Zamprogna in the chemistry read. The actress explained that she was a bit "apprehensive" about Valerie's relationship with Dante which made her take it more seriously. "I think we made it very believable" Sarpy said. "This is all new terrain for her." Because Valerie's life has been about her mother, "she's green to a lot of things" and she is bound to "make some mistakes" as she tries to develop new relationships. Sarpy credited Zamprogna with making her feel comfortable during the usually awkward filming process for the love scenes. In 2016, Sarpy admitted that Dante and Lulu's loft, where Valerie and Dante's affair occurred is her least favorite set to work on considering the history between the characters. "Ugh, just the idea of Valerie being Lulu's cousin makes it awkward!"

== Storylines ==
Looking for answers about Luke Spencer (Anthony Geary)'s mental state, his daughter Lulu (Emme Rylan) and his ex-wife Tracy Quartermaine (Jane Elliot) go searching for his estranged older sister Pat, and find her daughter Valerie instead. As she is held hostage by a gun wielding Luke, Valerie tells them Pat is dead. Luke ties Valerie up and threatens to kill her when he finds out she lied about her mother being dead. They struggle over his gun and Luke escapes leaving Valerie unconscious and she is discovered by Lulu and her husband Dante Falconeri (Dominic Zamprogna). Valerie reveals that Pat is alive and living in a nursing home because she has Multiple sclerosis and Luke has gone after her. Dante and Valerie find Pat (Dee Wallace) at her childhood home in Port Charles with the rest of the Spencers only for their reunion to be cut short when Pat suddenly passes away. Blaming Luke for her mother's death, Valerie tries to kill him, but Dante talks her down.

Valerie temporarily moves in with Dante and Lulu, and she bonds with him over being raised by single moms. Lulu becomes insecure about their growing closeness though Valerie and Dante maintain they are just friends. Valerie moves in with Lulu's brother Nikolas (Tyler Christopher) to give them space. However, Dante and Valerie become even closer when she starts working for the police department as an administrative assistant. Meanwhile, Valerie bonds with her aunt Bobbie (Jacklyn Zeman) when Bobbie tells her about their childhood. Later, Aunt Bobbi will encourage Valerie to go after her cousin Lulu's husband Dante. Valerie also moves in with her cousin and Bobbie's daughter Carly Corinthos (Laura Wright).

On Independence Day, Dante and Valerie end up sleeping together after a drunken Dante is mistakenly led to believe that Lulu is having an affair with her ex-boyfriend Dillon Quartermaine (Robert Palmer Watkins) while Valerie is grieving her mother. Valerie admits that she took advantage of a drunken Dante the morning after the tawdry one night stand. Dante and Lulu reconcile while Valerie agrees to keep quiet about the affair despite having feelings for him. Valerie later begins dating Dillon.

Valerie clashes with Lulu's best friend Maxie Jones (Kirsten Storms) who accuses her of going after Dante. They later reconcile and help Carly pick jewelry for her wedding. Valerie however is forced to leave the wedding early because she isn't feeling well. When Dante's father Sonny Corinthos (Maurice Benard) gets shot, Valerie wants to comfort him and Dante's partner Detective Nathan West (Ryan Paevey) warns her to keep her distance. Nathan reveals that he knows about their tryst and calls her out about her feelings for Dante. He advises her to devote her attention to someone else and Valerie turns to Dillon who quickly calls her out on using him to cover her feelings for Dante. However, Dillon admits to using her to cover up his residual feelings for Lulu. They agree to keep each other's secrets and decide to remain friends.

Valerie is shocked when Dante later confronts her believing she is pregnant, thanks to Nathan. Valerie clears up the misunderstanding and promises she has no residual feelings for Dante. Valerie later announces that she is starting the police academy. Valerie is blindsided when Dillon intentionally shows video footage of Valerie's confession at Lulu's Halloween Party publicly humiliating all involved. Valerie assures that she and Dante are over and blames Lulu for her and Dante's one night stand. After the revelation, Valerie goes to Lante's loft to comfort Dante—although she gives the excuse that her visit is talk to Lulu. Lulu returns to the loft to find Valerie and Dante sitting next to each other and assumes the affair is still on. Later, new police cadet Valerie gets paired with Dante on a stakeout.

On Thanksgiving Day, Valerie drops off a pie for a distraught and grieving Dante who is spending the day alone having gotten separation papers from Lulu and has just signed them. Valerie again takes advantage of the situation to seduce Dante. The next morning, Lulu, who has decided to patch things up with her husband, shows up at the loft to find a fully clothed Dante and a towel-clad Valerie. Valerie immediately launches into a tirade, accusing Lulu of making Valerie slept with Dante. Valerie agrees to enter a secret hook-up relationship with Dante, after Dante tells Valeries that that is all he is capable of at the moment. After Christmas, Valerie asks Dante for another secret hook up, and Dante tells her that he is busy. When Valerie probes Dante, Dante admits that over the Christmas holidays, he and Lulu didn't fight so much. At this point, Valerie ends things with Dante, which produces a palpable expression of relief on Dante's face.

Later after befriending the mysterious Greg (Brandon Barash), who helped repair her car when Valerie was stranded on the side of the road, Valerie meets up with him again, but this time Greg is having car trouble and asks Valerie for a ride. Greg then kidnaps her when Valerie realizes he is actually an escaped fugitive Johnny Zacchara. Johnny leaves Valerie trapped in an abandoned cabin that catches fire and she is rescued by Lulu. Valerie discovers that Johnny has been working on Lulu's behalf and exposes her to Dante. While she does not press charges, Valerie can't forgive Lulu for almost killing her.

In February 2016, Valerie meets Curtis Ashford (Donnell Turner) and after a game of pool, he asks her out. However, their Valentine's Day date is interrupted by his sister-in-law Jordan who warns Valerie that he is trouble. Curtis confesses that he has struggled with drug addiction in the past but is now clean. On their next date, Valerie and Curtis bond over losing their mothers and later team up to win the Crimson magazine contest and split the $1000 cash prize. They share their first kiss and Curtis convinces her to agree to another date. In June 2016, Valerie graduates from the police academy and Curtis throws a surprise for Val and her fellow graduates.

== Reception ==
"Singlehandedly, this soap newcomer has achieved the impossible by turning her footnote of a character — probably thrown in to usher Luke out as harmlessly as possible — into a leading contender on the crumbs of an established supercouple, Lante..."

— Carol Banks Weber on Sarpy as Valerie.

Sarpy received mostly negative feedback from fans on social media. The actress received a great deal of push back from fans. Carol Banks Weber of SoapHub initially disapproved of the writing for the biracial Valerie believing the writers had refused to tap into the character's full potential though Valerie was "clearly loaded with baggage" and could be "outrageous fodder in the hands of a creative, careful head scribe." Instead, Weber had come to see Valerie as an annoyance because the writing hadn't provided a real reason for viewers to invest in the character. Weber felt the character at times would "turn on a dime" to fit the plot driven writing. However, Weber praised Sarpy for her portrayal of Valerie in scenes in which she discusses being racially profiled and praised Sarpy's chemistry with Dominic Zamprogna. By August 2015, Weber had completely changed her tune about Valerie strictly based on Sarpy's portrayal. Weber said, "no other GH newcomer comes as prepared to unleash an entire bio-pic on a bare-bone story." She further praised the actress and said Sarpy "infuses Valerie, a Lante third wheel we're supposed to reflexively hate, with breathtaking, accessible, empathetic humanity." Weber continued, "There's a sad haunted quality to her character..."

Sarpy made her debut on the TV Source Magazine's fan poll of the Top Soap Actresses in September 2015. Jenn Bishop of TV Source Magazine argued that Valerie wasn't defined enough within the story for it work and she wasn't "feisty enough" to be a viable threat to Dante and Lulu. Kendall Joseph of Soap Happenings congratulated and applauded Sarpy for "doing a good job at having fans love and hate" her character, described the portrayal as "spot on" and said many agreed with the sentiment. "The role of Valerie Spencer is quickly becoming on the more popular, even if there is a lot of negativity clouded in there." Joseph also praised Sarpy's chemistry with Robert Palmer Watkins and but said "a love connection isn't really believable." Soap Opera Digest included the actress on its list of the "Hottest Newcomers" for the year 2015. In March 2016, Stacy Miller of Nerdy Girl Express launched the "We Love #GH 's Valerie Spencer Fan Project" in honor of Sarpy's one year anniversary where fans could share their appreciation for the actress and character. Miller observed that while the plot had its detractors, Valerie's relationship with Dante made her a fan favorite practically "overnight." Miller said "General Hospital has something special in this actress and her character. Thank you for hiring her to play this character." Soap Opera Spy also released a feature interview with Sarpy commemorating her one-year anniversary on the series.
