= Paulina Lule =

American actor and filmmaker

- Born: Paulina Lule Bugembe; Milwaukee, Wisconsin, US
- Occupations: Actor; writer; director
- Years active: 2012–present
- Spouse: Ren Kuwahara (m. 2022)

Paulina Lule Bugembe-Kuwahara is an American actor and filmmaker, best known for Agents of S.H.I.E.L.D, General Hospital, and The Emperor of Ocean Park.

== Early life and education ==
Paulina Lule Begumbe-Kuwahara grew up in the Washington Heights area of Milwaukee, Wisconsin. Of the city, Lule said that they loved the "laid back vibe of the Midwest, the lack of pretension, the food". Lule was inspired to be an actor and filmmaker after they watched The Matrix on DVD, which included bonus features detailing how the bullet scenes were filmed and subsequently convinced Lule that they wanted to create movies. They grew up "obsessed" with films and then left to do a lot of their acting training in California; Lule felt that they had to leave as no one around them was pursuing acting in Milwaukee. Lule studied film directing and screenwriting at the University of Hawaiʻi at Mānoa and received a Master of Fine Arts from Chapman University. They trained as an actor at the Joanne Baron/DW Brown Studio in Santa Monica, California and were accepted into the inaugural cohort of Identity School of Acting, Los Angeles.

== Career ==
=== Film and television ===
On March 28, 2019, it was reported that Lule had been cast as established character Valerie Spencer on the ABC soap opera General Hospital, and her first appearance aired the following month. Valerie had previously been portrayed by Brytni Sarpy, who had last appeared in the role in March 2019 after leaving the soap, and the role was subsequently recast to Lule as General Hospital producers did not want to lose the character. After last appearing in the episode originally broadcast on June 12, 2019, Lule returned to the role the following year for a short stint beginning on August 28, 2020. Lule portrayed Lilla McKenzie on the television series Agents of S.H.I.E.L.D. They appeared in Emperor of Ocean Park opposite actor Grantham Coleman.

Lule appeared in the film Honey Boy (2019). That same year, they also guest-starred as Military Police Officer Vera Armstrong in the season 17 episode "Going Mobile" of NCIS, which originally aired on October 8, 2019. They were also seen in Mikael Kreuzriegler's Deany Bean is Dead (2018), Femi Oguns’ Motel (2019) which they also co-wrote, Kate Tsang's Marvelous and the Black Hole (2021), Beau Ballinger's She Watches from the Woods (2021), and Nate Hapke's Surprise! (2024).

Lule is currently working on Sherman Park, a zombie-horror short about a Black man from Milwaukee returning to his home in Sherman Park after a six-year prison sentence. They set the film in Sherman Park as they and their family had grown up in Washington Heights, which was next to Sherman Park, and those areas had some of the highest incarceration rates in the United States. Lule said of the film, "When people know that you've been to prison, they treat you differently. A few years back, my brother was released from prison and I was feeling a lot of anxiety about him coming back into society. Was he going to be able to find a job? How is he going to rent a house? A lot of people who reenter society are denied these things." For the proof-of-concept, Lule received a 2023 Forward Fund Award from Milwaukee Film and crowdfunded the rest of the budget on IndieGogo.

=== Theatre ===
Lule portrayed Francine/Lena in Clybourne Park on stage at the Westchester Playhouse in Los Angeles in 2016. They joined the cast of HOOPS at Milwaukee Chambers Theatre (MCT) in 2023. In May 2026, Lule appeared in Milwaukee Chamber Theatre's production of A Raisin in the Sun about a 1950s family in the South Side, Chicago.

== Personal life ==
Lule identifies as non-binary, gender-fluid, and pansexual. They felt non-binary all of their life "deep down" but did not know how to "articulate" it until later in life. Lule has spoken about how much of the general public does not understand the non-binary identity and have said, "The thing about realising that I'm non-binary is that I've fully been allowed to be myself. So I don't feel a lot of angst about people making mistakes about who I am, because I know who I am." They have also noted that they were one of the first non-binary actors to be cast in a lead role of a television show that was not already famous beforehand. Lule was scared to come out as non-binary to their fiancé but he was accepting when Lule did. They have added that they see gender as a construct that was created "as a means of control" women, adding "The reason why there's a lot of backlash in [the USA], specifically about gender non-conforming people and trans people, is because they lose that control. If I say I'm not a woman, then the laws that you make about women's bodies no longer apply to me. That messes with their system." They married their longtime partner Ren Kuwahara in 2022.

In March and April 2020, Lule shared on social media that they had Covid-19. They experienced extreme shortness of breath and noted that they felt the sickest they had been in over ten years despite being considered a mild case. They were given an inhaler, painkillers, and prescription-strength cough medicine after visiting the emergency department of a hospital and they had to isolate for 14 days whilst sharing a one-bedroom apartment with their boyfriend. They recovered from the infection.

Lule moved back to Milwaukee from Los Angeles in 2022. The same year, their brother was killed when an unknown assailant opened fire on two men on the street.

=== Philanthropy and activism ===
In 2023, Lule worked with the Zoological Society of Milwaukee and the Milwaukee County Zoo, running the Kohl's Wild Theater Program to educate children about wildlife conservation. They also worked with the non-profit Milwaukee Film to teach filmmaking, screenwriting, and acting to local up-and-coming filmmakers in their Focus Finder accelerator lab. Lule is part of the steering committee at Action! Wisconsin, a statewide coalition that advocates for film and TV production tax incentives. Lule believed that the film incentives could bring jobs to the local economy due to money spent during production, adding, "Wisconsin has an incredible diversity of landscapes that we haven't really seen in film and television before. It is a beautiful state [...] You can go from urban to rural in 15 minutes, which from a production standpoint is very convenient". In 2025, Lule testified in favour of the SB 231 bill that offers tax credits to encourage filmmaking in Wisconsin.

== Filmography ==
=== Film ===
Year	Title	Role	Notes	Ref
TBA	Sherman Park		Short film	
2024	The Plague	Jessie	Short film	
	Surprise!	Briana		
2023	Blue Hour	Nurse		
2021	She Watches from the Woods	Maeve Graham	Short film	
2021	Marvellous and the Black Hole	Marianne		
2019	Honey Boy			
	Motel	Maria	Short film	
	It Happened One Night	Tia	Short film	
2018	Deany Bean is Dead	Izzy	Short film	
2016	The Homecoming		Short film	
	Chase Scene		Short film	
2014	I Stole Your Baby		Short film	
	Brother Sister		Short film	
2013	Flight or Fight	Jayme	Short film	

=== Television ===
Year	Title	Role	Notes	Ref.
2024	The Emperor of Ocean Park	Kilmer Madison-Garland	10 episodes	
2020	Agents of S.H.I.E.L.D	Lilla McKenzie	2 episodes	
2019–2020	General Hospital	Valerie Spencer	13 episodes	
2019	NCIS	Vera Armstrong	1 episode	
2018	Reverie	Sales rep	1 episode	
	For The People		1 episode	
	Love	Kate	1 episode	
2017	The Good Place	Angélique	1 episode	
2016	Scandal	Mellie’s aide	1 episode	
	Time Travelling Bong	Dasani	1 Episode	
