= Julie Berman =

American actress (born 1983)

- Born: November 3, 1983 (age 42); Los Angeles, California, U.S.
- Education: University of Southern California
- Occupation: Actress
- Years active: 1997–present
- Spouse: Michael Grady (m. 2008)
- Children: 2

Julie Marie Berman (born November 3, 1983) is an American actress. She is known for her role as Lulu Spencer on the ABC Daytime soap opera General Hospital, for which she received three Daytime Emmy Awards, and for her role on the Golden Globe nominated Hulu comedy series Casual as Leia, Valerie's receptionist.

== Early life ==
Berman was born to Peter and Renée Berman in Los Angeles, California. She started acting at the age of six.

== Career ==
Berman made her television debut with the recurring role in the WB family drama series, 7th Heaven as the misunderstood Shelby Connor, a friend of Lucy Camden. Berman continued her role on 7th Heaven, while simultaneously adding a recurring role in the ABC drama Once and Again. She also guest-starred on ER and Boston Public, and starred alongside Shelley Long in the 1999 television movie Vanished Without a Trace.

=== 2005–13; General Hospital ===
Berman is best known for her role as Lulu Spencer, the stubborn, troubled daughter of Luke and Laura Spencer, in the ABC daytime soap opera General Hospital. She made her first appearance on October 28, 2005. The casting immediately garnered much attention due to Berman's strong resemblance to Genie Francis who played Laura; Lulu and Laura's strong resemblance was often mentioned within the series. In July 2012, Berman informed producers that she had no plans of renewing her contract when it expired in November. Despite no official word from ABC or Berman, rumors began to circulate that Berman was about to vacate the role. After months of speculation, on February 26, 2013, an issue of Soaps In Depth confirmed that Berman was indeed leaving the series and had just filmed her final scenes.

Berman earned her first Daytime Emmy nomination in 2007, and won her first Daytime Emmy for Outstanding Younger Actress in 2009. She won her second consecutive Emmy in 2010 in the same category. Berman departed her role as Lulu in 2013, and was replaced by The Young and the Restless actress Emme Rylan In 2013, Berman won her third Emmy, but in the Daytime Emmy Award for Outstanding Supporting Actress category.

=== 2013–present ===
After leaving daytime television, Berman guest-starred on prime time comedy series include Two and a Half Men and Jane the Virgin. In 2015, she began the recurring role opposite Michaela Watkins and Frances Conroy in the Hulu comedy series, Casual. She was promoted to series regular for second season. Later that year, Berman joined the cast of NBC medical drama Chicago Med, playing the recurring role of Dr. Samantha "Sam" Zanetti.

== Personal life ==
Berman graduated with a bachelor's degree in Television and Cinema from the University of Southern California in May 2006. While at the university she was a member of the Kappa Kappa Gamma sorority.

Berman married Michael Grady on August 15, 2008. The couple welcomed their first child, son Asher Dean Grady on February 18, 2019. Their second child, son Holden Jeffrey Grady was born on January 18, 2022.

== Filmography ==
=== Film ===
Year	Title	Role	Notes
2014	Count to 10	Anna	Short
2017	Valley of the Moon	Molly	Unreleased

=== Television ===
Year	Title	Role	Notes
1997–99	7th Heaven	Shelby Connor	Recurring role
1999	Vanished Without a Trace	Cathy Porterson	Television film (NBC)
1999–2000	Once and Again	Julie	Recurring role
2000	ER	Jessamyn Chadsey	"The Fastest Year"
2002	Boston Public	Margo	"Chapter 46"
2005	Threshold	Kristy Foster	"Blood of the Children"
2005–13	General Hospital	Lulu Spencer	Series Regular
2007	General Hospital: Night Shift	Lulu Spencer	"Paternity Ward"
2012	Sand Sharks	Nikki	Television film
2012	The March Sisters at Christmas	Jo March	Television film (Lifetime)
2013	Bucket & Skinner's Epic Adventures	Vera	"Epic Showdown"
2013	Two and a Half Men	Sarah	"My Bodacious Vidalia"
2014	Jane the Virgin	Candyce	"Chapter 8"
2015	Satisfaction	Marie	"... Through Risk"
2015–16	Chicago Med	Dr. Samantha "Sam" Zanetti	Recurring role; 8 episodes
2015–18	Casual	Leia	Series Regular; 27 episodes
2016	Gilmore Girls: A Year in the Life	Serena Ainsworth	"Fall"
2017	Love on Ice	Emily	Television film (Hallmark)
2018–	There's Always Tomorrow	Lindsay Anderson Lacey	Web Series, Series Regular 77 Episodes (as Lindsay) 19 Episodes (as Lacey)
2021	CSI:Vegas	Tammy Shaw	"Pipe Cleaner"

== Awards and nominations ==
List of acting awards and nominations
Year	Award	Category	Title	Result	Ref.
2007	Daytime Emmy Award	Outstanding Younger Actress in a Drama Series	General Hospital	Nominated	
2009	Daytime Emmy Award	Outstanding Younger Actress in a Drama Series	General Hospital	Won	
2010	Daytime Emmy Award	Outstanding Younger Actress in a Drama Series	General Hospital	Won	
2013	Daytime Emmy Award	Outstanding Supporting Actress in a Drama Series	General Hospital	Won	
