= Marvelous and the Black Hole =

2021 American comedy drama movie

- Marvelous and the Black Hole Poster
- Directed by: Kate Tsang
- Written by: Kate Tsang
- Starring: Miya Cech; Leonardo Nam; Beth Hall; Kannon Omachi; Paulina Lule; Lauren Knutti; Rhea Perlman
- Cinematography: Nanu Segal
- Edited by: Ryan Denmark; Cyndi Trissel
- Music by: Tim Kiefer
- Production company: Tribeca Film Institute
- Distributed by: FilmRise
- Release date: February 2, 2021
- Running time: 81 minutes
- Country: United States

Marvelous and the Black Hole is a 2021 American bildungsroman comedy drama written and directed by Kate Tsang. The plot focuses on Sammy Ko (played by Miya Cech), a rebellious teenager reeling from the death of her mother, who befriends and is comforted by a surly magician (played by Rhea Perlman). The movie also stars Leonardo Nam, Beth Hall, Keith Powell, Lucy DeVito and Jonathan Slavin.

The film premiered on February 2, 2021 at the Sundance Film Festival and premiered in theaters on April 22, 2022.

== Cast ==
- Rhea Perlman as Margot the Marvelous, an orphaned magician
- Miya Cech as Sammy Ko the Black Hole, a rebellious thirteen-year-old who gets expelled from school
- Leonardo Nam as Angus Ko, Sammy's widower father who is busy with work
- Kannon Omachi as Patricia Ko, Sammy's elder sister who likes to play a video game called Kingdom Cog
- Paulina Lule as Marianne, Angus' fiance trying to warm up to her daughters
- Lauren Knutti as Claire
- Aris Alvarado as Vega
- Raymond McAnally as Dave
- Keith Powell as Leo
- Lucy DeVito as Annabelle
- Jae Suh Park as Sue
- Jonathan Slavin as Puck

== Production ==
Marvelous and the Black Hole received the Tribeca Festival's 2019 Untold Stories grant presented by AT&T. Production on the film, Tsang's debut feature, began later that year, with a goal of premiering at the 2020 Tribeca Festival, but its premiere was delayed to 2021 due to the COVID-19 pandemic.

In November 2021, FilmRise acquired North American distribution rights to the film.

== Broadcast ==
Yes TV aired the film in May 2025 with an 8+ PG (Adult Situation) rating.

== Reception ==
=== Critical reception ===
The film primarily received praise from critics, with a 84% "freshness" rating on review aggregator Rotten Tomatoes, as of May 2023. Katie Rife, writing for RogerEbert.com said, "This is obviously a low-budget effort, and possibly a personal one for writer/director Kate Tsang. That heartfelt element translates into the benevolence of the adults in this film." Concepción de León, writing for The New York Times, praised Cech's performance, but found the film to be one-noted with "too few moments of redemption or connection."

=== Awards and nominations ===
The film was nominated for best American independent film in the 2021 Cleveland International Film Festival and an audience award for best narrative feature in the 2021 Los Angeles Asian Pacific Film Festival. Tsang was nominate for an emerging filmmaker award for the movie in the 2021 Minneapolis–Saint Paul International Film Festival. The film won an audience award for best feature film in 2021 Sun Valley Film Festival.
