= Luke and Laura =

Fictional characters

- General Hospital character
- Anthony Geary and Genie Francis as Luke and Laura, 2006
- Duration: 1979–2002; 2006; 2008; 2013; 2015
- Created by: Pat Falken Smith (Note: While seeds for the couple's story were planted during Douglas Marland's tenure, Luke and Laura's actual romance doesn't start until 1980 during Smith's tenure.)
- Introduced by: Gloria Monty
In-universe information
- Other names: L&L
- Family: Spencer; Webber
- Children: Lucky Spencer; Lulu Spencer
- Grandchildren: Cameron Webber (adoptive); Jake Webber (legal); Aiden Webber; Rocco Falconeri; Charlotte Cassadine

Luke and Laura Spencer are fictional characters, and the signature supercouple from the American daytime drama General Hospital. Luke is portrayed by Anthony Geary, and Laura is portrayed by Genie Francis. Though other supercouples came before them, Luke and Laura are the best known outside of the soap opera medium and are credited with defining the term supercouple and leading other soap operas to try to duplicate their success.

Despite having been raped by a drunken Luke, Laura falls in love with him. Originally, critics of the soap opera genre panned the choice of having a rape victim fall in love with her rapist, an example of forced seduction. The unlikely pairing became popular in spite of Luke's past misdeed when the story shifted to focus on love and redemption.

The couple wed at the end of the hour-long show which aired on November 16 and 17, 1981; the event was watched by 30 million viewers and remains the highest-rated hour in American soap opera history. Viewers watched as the show followed their marriage through two decades and gave them two children. Today, their union still has a presence in fictional town Port Charles. In 1996, TV Guide included the wedding of Luke and Laura as part of its "100 Most Memorable Moments in TV History", ranking it number 35. On Internet message boards, the couple is often referred to as "L&L" or "LnL" (for Luke and Laura).

== Writing ==
=== General ===
In 1978, General Hospital was close to cancellation owing to low viewership. At that time, they were ranked lowest in the Nielsen ratings. To save the show, ABC executive Jackie Smith hired Gloria Monty as the show's executive producer and Douglas Marland as head writer. Monty wanted to attract a youth-based audience as a way of garnering higher ratings. To do this, she and Marland brought troubled teenager Laura Vining (Genie Francis) to the forefront of the series. The character went from appearing a couple of times a week to having fifty pages of script a day. "Gloria put sex and romance into Laura's life," Francis said, "and it bowled me over. Here I was doing things in front of 20 million people that I had never done in my life." Her early stories included killing her older lover, David Hamilton, for cheating on her with her mother and a popular romance with Scott "Scotty" Baldwin. In response, General Hospital's ratings rose as younger viewers began watching for Laura. Teenagers connected with her because she was their age and experienced some of the same problems they did, yet also lived "the life of a 28 year old".

Anthony Geary joined the cast in 1978 in what was meant to be a 13-week stint as Luke Spencer. His sister, Bobbie Spencer, brought him to town to help her break up Laura's relationship with Scotty. By the end of Geary's contract, Luke was supposed to be killed off. Like Laura, Luke appealed to teenage viewers because of his "edgy volatility". Since viewers expressed interest in Luke and Laura, the writers decided to have Luke die in Laura's arms, after which she would reunite with Scotty. Owing to the positive viewer response, the story moved towards a romance between Luke and Laura.

=== Rape ===
Pat Falken Smith replaced Marland as head writer of General Hospital in 1979 since he wanted to go slower with Luke and Laura's story than Monty had. Smith wrote a controversial rape storyline between Luke and Laura. To prepare for the story, Geary and Francis both met with a social worker before taping the rape scenes. Originally intended to be a brutal attack, Monty re-choreographed the scene's blocking in order for the encounter to come off as a seduction. She also took strong language and violence out of the scenes. General Hospital's music director at the time, Jill Farren Phelps, chose to use the song "Rise", written by Randy "Badazz" Alpert and Andy Armer, performed by trumpeter Herb Alpert during the rape scene and ensuing scenes that recalled the rape. "Every time Laura thought of the terrible rape by Luke, it was played to evoke that memory," Phelps said. "Consequently, we used it constantly for a while. Then we turned the story around so that he was no longer the rapist and that was no longer the appropriate piece of music." The song already ranked on the Billboard Hot 100, but the exposure "Rise" gained from appearing on General Hospital helped bring it to number one. After the story aired in October 1979, it was looked back on as a rape and Laura was shown getting rape counseling. However, the writers decided to have the characters look back on the incident as a seduction instead of a rape because the pairing resonated with the audience. "From that point on, we played [Luke's] regret and his total devastation," Geary said.

The rape was revisited in 1998 when Luke and Laura's son, Lucky, finds out about the incident. This time, the writers scripted it as rape instead of a seduction. Lucky struggled to come to terms with the revelation while Luke and Laura dealt with the unresolved issues surrounding the rape. In a 2000 interview with Soap Opera Digest, Geary said, for the taping of the scenes, "Alan Pultz, who had directed the rape originally, used his original notes and directed me that day to recall all of that. I was able to finally put out what I think is Luke's definitive statement: that it was rape, it was ugly, he'd probably never recover." He added, "I was grateful that the directors and the writers were interested in what Luke's experience was and didn't try to spin it for audience control."

=== Adventure plots ===
After the rape storyline, the focus of General Hospital began to center on Luke and Laura's romance. Before, the show revolved around hospital stories, including alcoholism, obesity, mental disorders, and cancer. Luke and Laura's adventure based plots took the show away from the hospital. In 1980, the couple spent the summer on the run, an "unprecedented" type of storyline at the time. Monty imbued that plot with elements of Frank Capra's 1934 film It Happened One Night and the 1941 Humphrey Bogart film The Maltese Falcon. She later used Dr. No and Tarzan as the inspiration for their plot to stop Mikkos Cassadine from taking over the world. As the show became laden with "comic-book fantasies", ratings remained high, but the viewer demographics became younger.

In a 2008 interview with Soap Opera Digest, Kin Shriner (Scott Baldwin) said Monty planned to continue the Scotty, Laura, and Luke triangle for a longer period, but his 1980 departure forced a story change. He returned to the show a year later. Former head writer Thom Racina intended to hold off the couple's marriage and allow them to be separated by Scotty for six more months. Elizabeth Taylor called General Hospital's studio after reading about the wedding's being postponed in a soap opera magazine. She made a deal to appear on the series if Luke and Laura married. Taylor appeared in five episodes as Helena Cassadine, the widow of Mikkos Cassadine, whom Luke and Laura killed. Luke and Laura's wedding, which aired on November 16 and 17, 1981, achieved the highest ratings in the history of daytime television. Shortly after the wedding aired, Francis left the show, taking a portion of the audience with her. To hold onto the younger viewers, the show began focusing more on "action-adventure" and less on "complex characterizations and psychological drama". Francis returned briefly in 1983 to facilitate Geary's exit. Both actors returned in 1984 to reprise their roles for six weeks. ABC brought them back hoping to raise General Hospital's ratings. Their return story involved a location shoot in Cuernavaca, Mexico and an adventure involving Holly Sutton and Robert Scorpio. The story aired from late October through early December 1984, after which the actors departed again and did not return until the 1990s.

=== Later years ===
Monty, who left the series in 1986, returned in 1991 with the hope she would again raise the ratings of the show. She brought Geary back to General Hospital that same year as Luke's look-alike cousin, Bill Eckert. The actor had refused to return to the show as Luke without Laura. The unpopularity of the Bill Eckert character led to ABC's firing Monty, killing off Bill, and bringing Luke and Laura back, played by Geary and Francis. Upon their return, the actors took more control of the writing for their characters. Geary, along with a writer friend, Irene Suver, developed the story for Luke and Laura's return. Geary's contract allowed him to rewrite his dialogue at his discretion. Francis and Geary were also known for fighting over story direction with executive producer Wendy Riche and the show's writers. The departure of head writer Richard Culliton days after a tense meeting with Geary caused rumors to circulate that the actor threatened to quit if Culliton were not fired. "The meeting did not go well, but I made no ultimatums and there was certainly no violence," Geary said. "I really don't know if I had anything to do with his departure, but I wouldn't shed any tears if I did." Francis supported Geary in what they considered to be standing up for the "integrity" of their characters and protecting the "Spencer franchise". "Sometimes people think we're difficult because of that, but we're only difficult because we want to live up to the high standards we've set," Francis said. "I actually like it when Tony gets out of line... He can go to horrid places I can't."

== Storylines ==
=== Luke, Laura, and Scotty (1978–1980) ===
Teenaged Laura begins dating Scott Baldwin (Kin Shriner) (known as "Scotty" at this point of the storyline). Then Laura is seduced by the much older David Hamilton, in a plot to get revenge on her mother Lesley Webber (Denise Alexander). Scotty breaks up with Laura and begins an affair with former prostitute, now nurse, Bobbie Spencer (Jackie Zeman). When Laura discovers the truth about David, she accidentally kills him. She is put on probation for David's death, eventually rekindles her relationship with Scotty, and they get engaged. Bobbie, in love with Scotty, gets her brother, Luke Spencer, to help her break up the couple. Bobbie makes it look like she and Scotty have slept together when Scotty gets drunk. Laura discovers this and ends up injured in a car accident. Luke, who has developed feelings for Laura, convinces Bobbie to drop her vendetta. Bobbie eventually moves on to a romance with Luke's best friend, Roy DiLucca (then Asher Brauner).

In July 1979, Scotty and Laura marry. He begins law school while she begins working at the Campus Disco, which is managed by Luke. She becomes attracted to Luke as he flirts with her, but shows no outward interest in him. Luke is involved with mobster Frank Smith (then George Gaynes), who orders him to kill anti-mafia senatorial candidate Mitch Williams on election night. Distraught over his unrequited love for Laura and the fact he could likely die during the assassination attempt, Luke vows to hold her in his arms before he dies. As the Herb Alpert song "Rise" plays, Luke rapes Laura on the floor of the disco. Conflicted, she admits to being raped, but does not name Luke as her attacker. On election night, she throws his car keys away to keep him from killing Mitch. Roy does the hit and apparently dies in Bobbie's arms after being shot by Mitch's security detail.

Frank, furious at Luke, demands he marry Frank's daughter, Jennifer (then played by Lisa Marie). To get out of this marriage, Luke orders Laura to tell Scotty he raped her. She refuses and gets jealous when she observes Luke flirting with Jennifer. Scotty tells Laura she has to quit her job at the disco. On her last night, she shares a romantic kiss with Luke. Horrified, she slaps him. Later she accidentally gets locked in his office, overhearing Luke and Frank discussing mob business. When Frank discovers her, he forces her to continue to work at the disco. She tells Luke not to marry Jennifer. He traps Laura on a sailboat and forces her to admit she wants him just as much as he wants her. When she does so, he releases her from his arms and tells her to go tell the authorities how it was rape, as he believes it wasn't. She refuses. He realizes he is in too deep with the mob to ever be with Laura. She writes him a letter expressing her feelings, trying to break the bond between them, which Scotty finds on the day of Luke and Jennifer's wedding.

Seething, Scotty confronts Laura with the letter in hand, and accuses her of having an affair with Luke. She vehemently denies there was an affair, and Scotty asks her if Luke really raped her. She didn't answer. He then pushes Laura to the floor, tells her she's lucky he doesn't kill both her and Luke, and storms out of their apartment to hunt down Luke.

After arriving at Luke's apartment and getting no answer, Scotty goes to Frank's yacht searching for Luke. After a short scuffle, Luke walks to the upper deck of the yacht where he and Scotty fight. Scotty upper cuts Luke, knocking him overboard, leading everyone to believe Luke is dead.

Later, in the scuffle around the yacht, Laura is walking by and Luke grabs her ankle from the water. She helps him get away and they decide to be on the run. He stole Frank's encoded black book, which holds the details of his criminal dealings. They could be free of the mob and be together if they could decode the book, so they flee Port Charles as Frank's men pursue them. While on the run, Luke and Laura dance at Wyndham's Department Store before ending up in the rural town of Beecher's Corners. They pose as newlyweds Lloyd and Lucy Johnson and are able to evade Frank's men, Jefferson "Hutch" Smith Hutchinson, and Sally Armitage (who it was revealed was really Max Hedges, in drag). Eventually, Luke and Laura find enough evidence to have Frank arrested. They celebrate by making love. On their return to Port Charles, the press bombards them. Still traumatized from the press attention she endured after David's death, Laura declares she still considers herself Scott's wife. A heartbroken Luke rejects her after hearing that.

=== Ice Princess saga (1981–1984) ===
While Laura attempts to find Scotty, who has fled to Mexico, she continues to pursue Luke and moves into the same apartment building as him. Meanwhile, Luke takes a job with wealthy Edward Quartermaine (then played by David Lewis) and his niece Alexandria (Renee Anderson), who are searching for the Ice Princess, the world's largest uncut diamond. Also in pursuit of the diamond is Mikkos Cassadine (John Colicos), a wealthy Greek tycoon bent on world domination. Luke and Laura reconcile and decide to get married when Robert Scorpio (Tristan Rogers), an agent for the World Security Bureau (WSB), informs Luke the statue the diamond is hidden in also contains a formula for a dangerous substance called "carbonic snow" that is powerful enough to freeze Port Charles.

Alexandria, working with Mikkos's brothers Victor and Tony (Thaao Penghlis and André Landzaat), acquires the diamond and decides to deliver it aboard Titan, the Cassadines' yacht and brings several Port Charles residents with her. Luke and Robert stow away on the yacht. They are shocked to discover Laura has done so as well. The trio arrive at Mikkos's private island in the Atlantic and discover he is planning on using the Ice Princess to hold the world for ransom, threatening to send the world into a new ice age. He also reveals Port Charles is to be used as an example, and soon the city is plunged into a blizzard, despite it being the middle of the summer. Alexandria and Tony are killed when they try to stop Mikkos. Luke is able to figure out the correct password to turn off Mikkos's machine. After struggling with Luke, Mikkos is killed. Luke, Laura, and Robert are hailed as heroes when they return to Port Charles. As Luke and Laura prepare to marry, Lee Baldwin (Peter Hansen) reveals he drunkenly burned Scotty and Laura's divorce papers. Lee attempts to find Scott in Mexico, but when they are unable to, Laura decides to have a Mexican divorce, risky since the divorce would be invalid should Scott ever contest it.

Luke and Laura marry on November 17, 1981, in a lavish ceremony officiated by the mayor of Port Charles, with hundreds of residents from Port Charles and Beecher's Corners in attendance. Bobbie and Laura are able to come to an uneasy truce, since they both love Luke. However, Mikkos' widow Helena Cassadine (then portrayed by Academy Award winning actress Elizabeth Taylor) arrives. She secretly places a curse on the couple during their reception, as she blames the duo for her husband's death. Later, Scott arrives. After catching Laura's bouquet, he declares he is contesting his divorce. As had occurred at Luke's aborted wedding to Jennifer, the men begin to fight. This time, Luke is the victor.

Scott is able to be talked out of contesting his divorce. In 1982, Laura mysteriously disappears off of a pier in Port Charles and is presumed dead. Jackie Templeton (Demi Moore) reveals her sister Laura Templeton (Janine Turner) disappeared under similar circumstances. The two friends discover a thief named David Gray was behind the disappearances. While Laura Templeton was not harmed, Gray revealed he had killed Laura Spencer, leading Luke to kill him during a fight. Luke, though still uncertain about his wife's ultimate fate, begins an affair with scam artist Holly Sutton (Emma Samms). Their affair is cut short when Luke is presumed dead in an avalanche. Holly falls in love with Robert, despite Luke revealing he is alive.

In 1983, an increasingly lonely Luke decides to run for mayor of Port Charles, and wins the election. While celebrating his victory, Laura Spencer reveals she is alive and had been kidnapped by the Cassadine family. Mikkos' cousin (later retconned as eldest son) Stavros Cassadine (then played by John Martinuzzi) had spared her life since he had fallen in love with her. He forced her to marry him, although the marriage was invalid because she was already married to Luke. Stavros came to town to claim his wife but was killed after falling down a flight of stairs after a struggle with Luke. The couple attempted to settle into their roles in politics but found the roles stifling, and decided to leave Port Charles in order to see the world.

In 1984, Robert helps Luke when he is accused of murder in Mexico, so that Luke would be free to be with Laura. When Luke is finally cleared, he returns to Laura, who announces the joyous news that she is pregnant. The Spencers immediately share their news with their friends. With this revelation, Luke and Laura made what seemingly would be their last appearance on General Hospital. In the following years, passing references to the couple would be made by several characters.

Later that year, Laura's mother Lesley appears to die in a car accident (later revealed to be arranged by the Cassadine family).

=== Return to Port Charles (1993–1998) ===
While traveling, Laura gives birth to Luke's son Lucas Lorenzo Spencer, Jr., whom they nickname Lucky (played by Jonathan Jackson). From prison, Frank Smith (then played by Mitchell Ryan) tracks them down and bombs a truck in the parking lot of the Triple L Diner in Canada where the family had been hiding, killing one of their friends. Lucky arrives in Port Charles alone and meets Luke's aunt Ruby Anderson (Norma Connolly) and is shortly joined by his parents. Frank's son Damian Smith (Leigh McCloskey) convinces Luke his family will remain unharmed if he joins Frank's protege Sonny Corinthos (Maurice Benard) in a scheme to smuggle in illegal aliens. Luke and Sonny agree to break Frank out of prison. The friends also agree to kill Frank once they do. Frank, however, uses Laura as a shield so he can escape. Luke and Laura attempt to track Frank down. They enlist the help of Jennifer Smith (now played by Roseanne Barr), who has since married slimy Billy "Baggs" Boggs (portrayed by Barr's then husband Tom Arnold). Luke is finally able to kill Frank, though his children would continue to torment the couple.

Laura reveals she is pregnant again and gives birth to a daughter named Lesley Lu Spencer and nicknamed Lulu. Luke's involvement in Sonny's business leads to a brief separation. They continue to be threatened by Damian Smith. When Damian is murdered, Laura is arrested for the crime. She is exonerated. It is revealed her lawyer Justus Ward (then played by Joseph C. Phillips), who was the illegitimate grandson of Edward Quartermaine (now played by John Ingle), was the killer.

Lulu is diagnosed with aplastic anemia and needs a bone marrow transplant but none of her family members are a match. Laura's son by Stavros Cassidine, Nikolas, donates his bone marrow at a hospital in Switzerland. Nikolas arrives in Port Charles with his uncle Stefan (Stephen Nichols) where they decide to stay, creating tension in the Spencer family, especially when Stefan begins to date Bobbie. Stefan had been Laura's only friend during her captivity. The two had developed romantic feelings for each other and were lovers. When he married Bobbie, Laura knew it was to make her jealous.

Stefan reveals Helena (now played by Constance Towers) had ordered him to kill Lesley. He instead saved her, though she was in a catatonic state. When mother and daughter are reunited, Luke conspires with Tom Hardy (Matthew Ashford) to fake their deaths to keep them safe from Helena. When their ruse is uncovered, the mourning Nikolas, Bobby, and Stefan turn against the family. Stefan threatens to reveal to Luke he could be Nikolas' father and forces Laura to leave town with Lesley. A fearful Laura takes her mother and Lulu to Switzerland under the guise of getting better care for Lesley.

=== Marital woes (1998–2002) ===
Laura returns in 1998 to discover Nikolas has been shot in front of Luke's club as a result of Luke's ties to Sonny Corinthos. She also discovers Nikolas told Lucky about Luke raping her, devastating Lucky who has fallen in love with rape victim Elizabeth Webber (Rebecca Herbst). Lucky slowly works towards repairing his relationship with his parents. Laura and Luke eventually separate when the truth about her past with Stefan is revealed, leading to Stefan and Bobbie divorcing. The marriage is further tested when Lucky appears to die in a fire, which the couple blame on Sonny. Helena, however, has kidnapped Lucky. She begins to brainwash him. Laura begins a relationship with Stefan. However, when Luke learns Lucky is alive, they suspect Stefan may have been involved in his disappearance. Laura ends things. The two focus all their energies on finding their son. When they do, they work together to help him recover from Helena's manipulations. Along the way, they must again deal with Jennifer Smith, now played by Sally Struthers.

The kidnapping of Lucky was a distraction for Helena's real plan, the revival of her presumed dead son Stavros (now Robert Kelker-Kelly), who had been cryogenically frozen. Stavros once again pursues the Ice Princess in another plot to take over the world. Luke and Laura continue to reach out to Lucky (then-Jacob Young). When Stefan disappears and is presumed dead, Luke is the main suspect. Felicia reveals that she and Luke were having sex when Stefan went missing. Laura finally realizes she and Luke are over. She begins a new relationship with her first husband Scott Baldwin, making Luke jealous. The Spencers reconnect while trying to help Lucky. In the end Stavros falls to his death in a seemingly bottomless pit after struggling with Luke. Unable to deny the history between them, Luke tries to get back together with Laura after their divorce is final. Laura then leaves Port Charles in June 2001. Laura returns in February 2002 and Luke and Laura eventually reconcile and plan to marry again. Lesley's philandering former husband and Laura's beloved step-father Rick Webber (Chris Robinson) returns to Port Charles. Laura begins to have disturbing flashbacks to when she was a young teen and in love with Scott. Laura starts to believe Rick had killed his former lover Theresa in the attic of their family home. Before her wedding, while trying to recover her memories of that night, Laura appears to kill Rick, who she thinks is attacking her. Scott reveals Laura had killed Theresa when she discovered the two in a compromising position. He and Rick had drugged her and covered up the murder.

Laura, unable to cope with her role in two deaths, loses touch with reality. In 2002, Luke is forced to commit Laura to an insane asylum. As his presence only makes things worse, he gives Nikolas power of attorney over all of her medical decisions. Eventually, Laura slips into a catatonic state.

=== Laura's return (2006) ===
By September 2006, Luke is married to Edward's manipulative daughter Tracy Quartermaine (Jane Elliot). However, Robert's daughter, Dr. Robin Scorpio (Kimberly McCullough), announces a potential drug therapy that can help Laura recover. Despite knowing that it could lead to permanent catatonia, Luke decides to go ahead with the treatment as all of Laura's children desperately need her. Lucky (then-Greg Vaughan) is recovering from a drug addiction and had an affair with Felicia's daughter Maxie Jones (Kirsten Storms), Lulu has recently had an abortion, and Nikolas is raising a young son on his own. On October 26, 2006, Laura awakens and is surprised that so much time has passed. While Laura bonds with her children, Luke flies to the Dominican Republic and appears to divorce Tracy in order to give Laura the wedding they had been planning before her mental illness. Laura is able to remember killing Rick and apologizes to her mother and family for what she put them through. Feeling stronger, Laura gets her children to start revealing their secrets so she can help them.

Luke is revealed to be keeping secret that the drug therapy is only a temporary solution and that Laura will eventually return to her catatonic state. Lulu is able to convince her cousin Carly Corinthos (Laura Wright) to postpone her marriage to Jasper Jacks (Ingo Rademacher), allowing her parents to use the supplies already in place. On November 16, 2006, Luke and Laura remarry on their 25th wedding anniversary. A drunken Tracy has to be removed from the ceremony, and scheming Maxie manages to sneak into the ceremony and catch Laura's bouquet, much like Scott had 25 years before. On November 20, Luke reveals that Laura's illness is no longer mental but physical and she will soon revert to her catatonic state. Laura decides she wants an early Christmas as she may not be around for the real one and is able to comfort Lulu when she reveals the truth about her abortion. When Luke arrives with the tree, Laura is confused, confirming that her catatonia is returning. After being escorted back to the asylum, Laura reveals to her daughter that she does not think she really killed Rick Webber and asks her to prove her innocence. After saying goodbye to her family, Laura returns to her chair and sits with Luke as he tearfully watches her slip back into silence.

=== After Laura's return to catatonia (2008) ===
Lulu begins investigating Rick's death, and starts to suspect Tracy's brother Alan Quartermaine (Stuart Damon) and his wife Monica Quartermaine (Leslie Charleson) of the murder, since Monica and Rick had been lovers. However, when Alan dies from a heart attack, Lulu intercepts a letter from Alan to her father revealing that Scott actually killed Rick. Lulu teams up with her boyfriend Logan Hayes (Josh Duhon) to prove Scott's guilt, while Scott attempts to gain guardianship of Laura. After telling Lulu that Luke raped Laura, Scott is able to gain custody of her, only to have Luke kidnap Laura and send her into hiding. Logan reveals himself to be Scott's son, and his relationship with Lulu begins to unravel after interference from Maxie. Laura, meanwhile, is returned to Shadybrook, and Nikolas is again given guardianship. Desperate to get Lulu back, Logan attacks Maxie, and when he realizes that Lulu has witnessed this, he breaks into the penthouse she is sharing with her new boyfriend Johnny Zacchara (Brandon Barash). Lulu is forced to stab him with a knife, and after fleeing from police with Johnny, Lulu begins to lose her grip on reality and is eventually placed in the same asylum as her mother.

While at Shadybrook, Laura reveals to Lulu that she has been waking up but wants it kept from the family in case she relapses. Laura helps Lulu work through her guilt over Logan's death, though Lulu again questions her sanity when doctors reveal that the Laura she has been talking to is a figment of her imagination. Scott finds Lulu talking to her still catatonic mother and begins threatening to have her arrested for Logan's death. Upon hearing her daughter in danger, Laura really wakes up and convinces Scott to leave with her to protect her daughter. Laura and Scott head to Los Angeles, where their first honeymoon took place, as Tracy and Luke pursue them. Laura and Luke are able to reunite, but their happiness is short lived when Laura learns that their last wedding was a fake and that Luke is still married to Tracy. Laura returns to Port Charles and after a joyful reunion with her family decides to move to Europe to continue treatments to insure that she does not relapse. Unknown to her, Scott Baldwin follows.

=== Second Ice Princess and Luke's departure from Port Charles (2013–2015) ===
On February 11, 2013 Laura returns once more to Port Charles. She catches up with daughter Lulu at the Haunted Star and tells her of her long visit with Lucky in Ireland. On February 19, 2013, Luke and Laura are surprised when Lulu receives an uncut Ice Princess rock from an unknown person; it turns out to be a fake. This chain of events eventually results in Lulu being kidnapped by Helena and Stavros Cassidine. Luke and Laura, accompanied by Lulu's husband Dante, are able to rescue Lulu only to discover that her memory has been wiped. However, Lulu's memories are eventually restored thanks to Dante.

In 2015, Laura returns to Port Charles again seeking Luke's help in saving their son Lucky from Helena, which results in the rescue of both Lucky and his young son Jake. Luke later departs from Port Charles soon afterward on a journey of self-healing in order to fight off the demons of his past, leaving a goodbye letter for Laura in which he refers to her as his "Angel".

=== Luke’s Death and Memorial Tributes ===
On New Year's Day 2022, Tracy Quartermaine returns to Port Charles to inform Laura (who has since married Kevin Collins) that Luke was killed during a cable car accident in Austria, which is implied to have been set in motion by Victor Cassadine. A public memorial service is held in Luke’s memory, with a second tribute taking place in early 2026 with Laura, Tracy, Lulu, Sonny, and Carly in attendance.

During a private visit to the local church, Laura reminisces on the life, adventures, and happiness that she shared with Luke as she tearfully thanks him for giving her the love of a lifetime.

== Cultural impact ==
Luke and Laura Spencer at their wedding in 1981.

Luke and Laura's November 17, 1981 wedding brought in 30 million viewers; it remains the highest rated soap opera episode in American daytime television history. Elizabeth Taylor made a cameo appearance during the event, and Princess Diana sent champagne. The couple was subsequently credited with having brought "legitimacy to daytime serials" by crossing boundaries and becoming celebrities in the mainstream media. "[They took daytime] out of the closet so people were not ashamed to say 'I watch a soap.' General Hospital and Luke and Laura...were like the super couple," said Lilana Novakovitch, a Canadian agent for soap opera stars. "They ended up being on the cover of People magazine, Newsweek magazine; they gave credibility to soap opera fans."

Soap Opera Digest columnist Carolyn Hinsey stated that she was at her Indiana University sorority house when the wedding took place. "Laura Spencer — like the actress portraying her, Genie Francis — was only 19 at the time and leading a much more glamorous life than the girls in Indiana could imagine," she said. "The relationship had creepy overtones, given that Luke had raped Laura two years earlier, and yet it captured the imagination."

There had never been a more influential soap opera moment than Luke and Laura's wedding. There never will be again. You could walk down the hallway and talk to anyone on our daytime staff, and they could tell you where they were when Luke and Laura got married.

— Brian Frons, president of ABC Daytime.

Francis said, "I didn't really understand how big it was. I really enjoyed all my time at work. The hard time was when I was not working. Fortunately, there were not many of those hours." Geary stated, "It just wasn't anything that I was prepared to deal with as an actor, because I was in daytime. We were international celebrities but still considered small-screen." Geary continued, "People didn't take it seriously and those that did took it too seriously. It was a very, very odd place to be."

The widespread media attention of Luke and Laura's wedding set the pairing up as "the model" for other soap opera supercouples. Shows wanted to duplicate their success, and, with the exception of rape for most of the couples, started incorporating the same type of action stories, romantic themes, and tales of intrigue which had originally contributed to Luke and Laura's popularity.

Luke and Laura are regarded as daytime television's quintessential and most iconic couple. In 2023, Charlie Mason from Soaps She Knows placed Laura and Luke at first and second place, respectively, on his ranked list of General Hospital's 40+ Greatest Characters of All Time.

== See also ==
- "Fascination" (1932 song), commonly associated with the couple; first played during the famous dance at Wyndham's Department store
- "Rise" (1979 song by Herb Alpert)
- "Think of Laura" (1983 song by Christopher Cross; commonly associated with the couple)
- List of supercouples
