= Luke Spencer =

Fictional character from General Hospital

- General Hospital character
- Anthony Geary as Luke Spencer
- Portrayed by: Anthony Geary (1978–2017); Guy Wilson (2006); Joey Luthman (2015)
- Duration: 1978–1984; 1993–2015; 2017
- First appearance: November 20, 1978
- Last appearance: May 4, 2017
- Created by: Douglas Marland
- Introduced by: Gloria Monty (1978, 1984); Wendy Riche (1993); Frank Valentini (2017)
- Book appearances: Robin's Diary; The Secret Life of Damian Spinelli
- Spin-off appearances: Port Charles; General Hospital: Night Shift; General Hospital: Twist of Fate (1996)
- Crossover appearances: Roseanne
In-universe information
- Other names: Lucas Lorenzo Spencer Sr.; Lloyd Johnson; Nick Charles; Dr von Scheemerman; Peter Caspin
- Occupation: Con artist; Restaurant owner; Casino owner; Nightclub owner; Mayor; Club owner; Disco owner; Mobster
- Family: Spencer
- Parents: Tim Spencer; Lena Eckert
- Sisters: Pat Spencer; Bobbie Spencer
- Wife: Laura Webber (1981–2001, 2006-2008); Jennifer Smith (2002); Tracy Quartermaine (2005-2006,2010-2011, 2014)
- Sons: Lucky Spencer; Ethan Lovett
- Daughters: Lulu Spencer
- Grandsons: Aiden Spencer; Rocco Falconeri; Jake Webber (legal); Cameron Webber (adoptive)
- Granddaughters: Charlotte Cassadine; Phoebe Wilson
- Grandmothers: Beatrice Eckert
- Uncles: Fred Eckert
- Aunts: Ruby Anderson
- Nephews: Lucas Jones (adoptive)
- Nieces: Carly Corinthos; B. J. Jones; Valerie Spencer
- First cousins: Bill Eckert; Jenny Eckert
- Other relatives: Michael Corinthos; Morgan Corinthos; Donna Corinthos; Josslyn Jacks; Jonah Corinthos

Luke Spencer is a fictional character in the American television soap opera General Hospital, played by Anthony Geary from 1978 until his departure in July 2015. Geary holds the record for most Daytime Emmy wins for Outstanding Lead Actor in a Drama Series for his work as Luke. He was the show's fifth most tenured character after Monica Quartermaine, Laura Spencer, Scott Baldwin, and Bobbie Spencer.

The character was famously paired with Laura Spencer (named Laura Webber when he met her), starting soon after Luke Spencer joined the show. The pairing, termed "Luke and Laura" by fans, was extremely popular with viewers, and led to the creation of the "supercouple" concept, which many other soap operas attempted to emulate. The pairing culminated with the couple's wedding, which took place on the episodes aired on November 16–17, 1981; the November 17 episode was watched by 30 million people and remains the most watched hour in soap opera history.

== Casting ==
Anthony Geary was originally hired for a 13-week stint on General Hospital in November 1978, which eventually grew into a full contract role. Geary received Daytime Emmy nominations for Outstanding Lead Actor in a Drama Series in 1980 and 1981, and had his first win in 1982. Geary was nominated again in 1983, before leaving the show on December 27, 1983. He later reprised the role from October 26 to December 10, 1984.

In 1991, Geary returned to General Hospital as Luke's cousin and look-alike Bill Eckert, due to the actor's desire to play something other than Luke. However, in response to audience feedback and demand, the character was killed off, and Geary resumed the role of Luke on October 29, 1993. Geary was nominated in 1997 and 1998 for Daytime Emmys for Outstanding Lead Actor, and had his second win in 1999, and his third in 2000. He received another nomination in 2003, and had his fourth win in 2004. When Geary won for the fifth time in 2006, he set the record for most lead actor wins.

Geary has been known in later years for his annual long vacations from the show. As Geary explained to Entertainment Weekly, "That's my contractual situation. There came a point where they really couldn't offer me more money in negotiations. I've made a very fine living and I'm grateful for that. But what they could offer me would be more time. So what's happened is that through the years I've eked out what I think is an ideal situation. I have a minimum number of shows, 31 weeks a year, and the rest of my time is my own."

Geary received another Emmy nomination in 2007, and in 2008, he again set a record for most lead actor wins with his sixth Emmy for Outstanding Lead Actor. Also in 2008, Geary made a guest appearance on the General Hospital spin-off General Hospital: Night Shift.

Having received his last nomination in 2009, Geary again set a record in 2012 with his seventh win for Outstanding Leading Actor in a Drama Series. In May 2015, Geary announced his decision to permanently leave General Hospital, stating: "This show has been a huge part of my life for over half my life and Luke Spencer is my alter ego. But I'm just weary of the grind and have been for 20 years." Geary made his final appearance on July 27, 2015.

Soap Opera Digest announced in April 2017 that Geary would make a guest appearance on May 4, 2017, in conjunction with the exit of Jane Elliot's Tracy Quartermaine.

== Storylines ==
=== Background ===
Lucas Lorenzo Spencer, known as Luke, was born and raised in Port Charles, New York, as the son of Tim Spencer and Lena Eckert. Tim was an abusive alcoholic, who regularly beat Luke, his sisters Patricia and Bobbie, and their mother. In 2015, it was revealed that in an attempt to protect his mother from Tim, he accidentally struck her over the head with a baseball bat, resulting in her developing a head injury that led to her death. When Tim taunted Luke with the news that he had murdered his own mother, Luke responded by beating Tim to death with the same bat he had hit his mother with. As a result of the psychological trauma of these events, Luke would block out these memories for the next fifty-two years, when Patricia, whom he had not seen since, told him the truth.

At some point in his youth, Luke ended up befriending Lila Quartermaine (Anna Lee), who had intended to adopt both him and Bobbie. However, before they could, the two left Port Charles with their aunt, Ruby Anderson (Norma Connolly), who worked in Florida as a prostitute. Bobbie, who was only 14 years old at the time, began working in the same profession.

=== 1978–1984 ===
After leaving prostitution behind, Bobbie (Jacklyn Zeman) became a nurse and returned to Port Charles in December 1977. After becoming infatuated with Scott Baldwin (Kin Shriner), she sought help from Luke in an effort to help break up Scott's engagement to Laura Webber (Genie Francis), who also returned to town and began working at the Campus Disco. The Disco operated as a front for a money-laundering racket operated by Frank Smith (George Gaynes), a local mobster. Luke soon fell in love with Laura and refused to help Bobbie further when one of her schemes resulted in Laura being injured in a car accident.

Laura and Scott were eventually married, with Luke pining for her in secret. In an effort to earn money to buy Scott a law library, Laura began working at the Campus Disco alongside Luke and became drawn to his unconventional way of living and sense of adventure. Meanwhile, Luke was being pressured by Frank Smith to kill Mitch Williams (Christopher Pennock), a corrupt politician who was running for Senate with a platform to crack down on organized crime. Realizing that he was likely a dead man, regardless of the outcome, Luke confessed his feelings to Laura the night before the hit, and overcome by anguish, raped her on the floor of the Campus Disco. In an effort to save Luke, his friend Roy DiLucca (Asher Brauner), attempted to pull off the hit but was caught and seemingly killed.

In 1980, Frank pressured Luke into marrying his daughter, Jennifer (Lisa Marie). On Luke and Jennifer's wedding day, Scott discovered a letter written by Laura to Luke revealing that he had raped her. As Luke and Jennifer were about to exchange vows on a yacht, Scott boarded and proceeded to start a fight with Luke, resulting in Luke falling overboard and all in attendance presuming he had drowned. Later, while pacing the docks, Laura was stunned when Luke reached out from the water and grabbed her leg. The two then worked together to steal a black book containing evidence of Frank's criminal activities, and armed with a clue about a "Left-Handed Boy", went on the run.

While on the run with Luke, Laura began to fall in love with him but was reluctant to break her vows to Scott. Frank then sent a hit man, Hutch Hutchins (Rick Moses), after the duo but after catching up with them, he kept his identity a secret and began working with them at a tavern run by another of Frank's hit men, Max Hedges (Chris Morley), who was disguised as a woman named Sally Armitage. After locating a statue known as the "Left-Handed Boy", Luke and Laura were able to use the inscription on the statue to decode Frank's book, resulting in his arrest and imprisonment for the next thirteen years. In the aftermath, Luke and Laura returned to a farm on which they had spent joyful time together and had sex for the first time.

Upon their return to Port Charles, they were greeted by a bevy of reporters. Overcome by memories of the David Hamilton murder trial, Laura confessed that despite being unfaithful while away, she was still Mrs. Laura Baldwin. Feeling rejected, Luke turned away from Laura, despite her willingness to divorce Scott. In time, both Luke and Laura began working for Edward Quartermaine (David Lewis) at ELQ Industries. While under his employ, Luke met his niece, Alexandria (Renee Anderson), who enlisted him to locate the "Ice Princess", a large, uncut diamond that she had painted and lost in transit to Port Charles.

Luke met a secret agent named Robert Scorpio who worked for the WSB (World Security Bureau), a secret government spy agency whose mission was to stop Mikkos Cassadine and his brothers. Luke teamed up with Robert and headed to the Cassadine compound on an island off the coast of Venezuela. After they left Port Charles they discovered that Laura had stowed away with them.

Actress Tiffany Hill, a guest of Mikkos', joined the trio in their mission. They defeated Mikkos and his powerful ice machine, and returned to Port Charles in triumph. Laura obtained a divorce from Scott and began planning a lavish wedding with Luke. Laura and Bobbie ended their feud and became close sisters-in-law.

Luke and Laura were married by the Port Charles mayor on November 16, 1981, in a spectacular public ceremony at the mayor's manor. Mikkos' widow, Helena Cassadine, watched the wedding from a hidden spot and vowed she would curse their marriage. Helena blamed Luke and Laura for her husband's death.

Laura mysteriously disappeared in 1982. A thief named David Gray claimed to have killed her, and an enraged Luke killed him in a fight.

Luke, though still uncertain about his wife's ultimate fate, began an affair with scam artist Holly Sutton. Their affair was cut short when Luke was presumed dead in an avalanche. Holly fell in love with Robert, despite Luke revealing he was alive. Increasingly lonely, Luke decided to run for mayor of Port Charles, and won the election.

In 1983, Laura Spencer then revealed she was alive and had been kidnapped by the Cassadine family. Mikkos' cousin (later retconned as eldest son) Stavros Cassadine had spared her life since he had fallen in love with her. He forced her to marry him, though the marriage was invalid because she was already married to Luke. Stavros came to town to claim Laura, but was killed after falling down a flight of stairs after a struggle with Luke. The couple attempted to settle into their roles in politics, but found the roles stifling. They decided to leave Port Charles that year in order to see the world.

In 1984, Robert helped Luke when he was accused of murder in Mexico so that Luke would be free to be with Laura. When Luke was finally cleared, he returned to Laura, who announced the joyous news that she was pregnant. The Spencers immediately shared their news with their friends. With the revelation, Luke and Laura made what seemingly would be their last appearance on General Hospital. In the following years, passing references to the couple would be made by several characters.

Later that year, Laura's mother Lesley appeared to die in a car accident (later revealed to be arranged by the Cassadine family).

=== 1993–2002 ===
Luke and Laura returned to Port Charles in 1993. Frank Smith's mob was in pursuit of the couple and their 10-year-old son, Lucky Spencer. On August 8, 1994, Laura gave birth to a daughter, Lulu Spencer.

Mobster Sonny Corinthos killed Frank Smith and took over his territory. Sonny befriended Luke, which almost cost Laura and Lulu's lives in 1995.

In 1996, a young woman named Carly Roberts arrived in Port Charles and began working at General Hospital as a physical therapist. Carly slowly insinuated herself into the Spencer family.

Lulu was diagnosed with aplastic anemia in May 1996 and needed a bone marrow transplant to save her life. Luke was shocked when 16-year-old Nikolas Cassadine arrived in town and revealed himself as Laura's son with Stavros Cassadine. Laura had conceived Nikolas while the Cassadines held her captive. Nikolas' bone marrow matched his half-sister Lulu's and saved her life.

Nikolas and his uncle Stefan settled in Port Charles and began to meddle in the Spencers' lives. The Cassadine-Spencer feud, coupled with Laura's bombshell news of her secret son Nikolas, proved catastrophic to her marriage with Luke.

Luke discovered Carly Roberts was actually Carly Benson, a daughter Bobbie had given up for adoption during her career as a teen prostitute. Luke kept Carly's secret but used it to blackmail her. Carly, bitter and vengeful toward her mother Bobbie, had an affair with her mother's husband Tony. Bobbie divorced Tony after she caught him in bed with Carly. Bobbie then married Stefan. The marriage came to a quick end after Luke attempted to kill Stefan.

Luke and Laura faced emotional turmoil when Lucky discovered that Luke had raped Laura. Lucky began to date Elizabeth Webber, who had also been raped at the age of fifteen. Lucky was presumed dead after a fire in 1999, and the trauma ended his parents' long separation with a divorce.

In 2000, Luke and Laura realized Lucky was still alive and a captive of Helena Cassadine. Luke and Laura joined forces to search for their son and rekindled their love for each other. This reunion ended when Luke began a relationship with Felicia Jones.

Laura realized her romance and marriage with Luke were indeed over, and she rekindled her relationship with her first husband, Scott Baldwin. Luke became jealous but didn't try to reconcile with Laura. After months of dragging their feet, the couple officially divorced in 2001, shortly before their 20th wedding anniversary. Scott then proposed to Laura. Luke was devastated by Scott's proposal, but told Laura he wanted her to be happy. Laura made the painful decision to decline Scott's marriage proposal. Luke seized this opportunity to win Laura back and become a family again. He romanced Laura for months to convince her that they belonged together, and she agreed to remarry. They made plans for a second wedding in 2002, but Laura recovered a memory of murdering her stepfather Rick Webber. The shock led to a breakdown, and Laura entered a mental hospital.

=== 2005–2015 ===
Luke married Tracy Quartermaine after a drunken night in Vegas in May 2005. Their marriage blossomed into true love but tranquility was interrupted in 2006 when Laura re-awakened. Luke, unwilling to risk another mental breakdown, didn't reveal his marriage with Tracy. Luke staged a remarriage ceremony with Laura performed by an actor instead of a minister. Laura slipped back into her catatonic state on November 22. Luke reconciled with Tracy.

The Spencers faced more trauma after Lulu discovered her mother's rape by her father decades before. In October 2007, Tracy and Luke attended the Cassadine's Black and White Ball, which was dedicated to a deceased Alan Quartermaine. Tracy fell and injured her back at the party. Luke had a near-fatal heart attack and his own surgery while looking after Tracy, Luke initially refused treatment but agreed to bypass surgery in December 2007. Luke was given a clean bill of health in January 2008. In August 2008 Lulu murdered Logan Hayes and slowly lost mental stability. Laura awakened in time to protect her daughter from an enraged Scott Baldwin. Scott took revenge on Luke and informed Laura that Luke had been married to Tracy since 2005. Laura eventually reunited with Luke and they shared a bittersweet farewell and last kiss before Laura moved to France. Luke reconciled with Tracy on December 31, 2008.

On January 15, 2009, Luke caught a thief trying to rob the Haunted Star, the yacht he acquired from the Cassadines in 1984. Ethan gradually revealed himself as the creation of Luke's one night stand with Holly Sutton. Luke was later kidnapped by Helena Cassadine and held captive until September 30, 2009, when Lulu and Ethan rescued him. They brought Luke and a sick Helena Cassadine back to Port Charles. Luke discovered Elizabeth Webber, who planned to remarry Lucky, was having an affair with Nikolas. Helena told Luke that Mikkos's long-lost son, Valentin, planned to come to Port Charles and unleash havoc on the Spencer/Cassadine families.

Ethan was accused of assaulting Sonny's daughter Kristina Davis in March 2010. Luke believed Ethan when he swore he didn't hurt Kristina, and persuaded him to remain in town. Lucky and his partner Dante Falconeri investigated Kristina's story and warned Sonny, who planned to place a hit out on Ethan, to stay away from him. Luke's friendship with Alexis Davis, Kristina's mother, became strained as a result. On April 2, Kristina was beaten again, but this time everyone realized she was attacked by her boyfriend Kiefer Bauer on both occasions. Kiefer was hit and killed by a car that same night. Ethan became a suspect in his death and was arrested due to damage to his car. Alexis confessed she accidentally hit Kiefer while en route to General Hospital with Kristina, and Ethan was released. Ethan, enraged by the false accusation, blew up on Kristina at the hospital and was forcibly removed. Ethan calmed down and apologized to Kristina. Luke told Lucky that Ethan probably should apologize, and everyone else in Port Charles, including Kristina, should line up and apologize to him first.

On May 13, 2010, Sonny apologized to Luke for his pursuit and revenge on Ethan for a crime he didn't commit. Though reluctant to forgive Sonny for impulsively accusing his son and trying to kill him, Luke nonetheless sympathized with his currently-strained relationship with his children.

In June 2010, while held as Helena's captives, Luke admits to a delirious and ill Tracy that they were never legally married. After becoming engaged at Thanksgiving, Luke and Tracy were married (legally) again in front of their friends and family on December 21, 2010, and leave for a honeymoon trip to Prague. In February 2011 Luke was at Sonny's wedding to Brenda. He was there when the limo blew up and held Sonny back like he did the night Lily died. On March 28, Luke is discovered to be the one who hit Jake, much to his horror. Though Lucky accuses him of drunk driving, Luke firmly insists he was not. When later confronted by Jason, Luke, having been expecting him, is resigned to his fate and even gives Jason his gun to use on him; however, Jason refrains from pulling the trigger at the last second.

Luke's family stage an intervention, to prompt Luke into facing up to his alcohol addiction. After promising to go into rehab, Luke once again gives his loved ones the slip, and flees Port Charles for the summer.

On May 24, 2012, Luke and Tracy discover Anthony Zacchara's dead body at the boat house. Luke and Tracy were both arrested for the killing of Anthony Zacchara. At the Haunted Star on June 21, 2012 Luke finds Heather Webber eavesdropping on him and she later yanks him with a beer bottle, causing him to fall down to the ground, where she later held him hostage at a shack in the woods. On July 23, 2012 Anna Devane finally finds him, but when she found him the shack was on fire. Later Heather shows up and knocks Anna out, then Anna strikes back by fighting her back and later put her in handcuffs. When Anna frees Luke from the fire, Heather pulls out a gun and aims at her. She pulls the trigger and Luke steps in the bullet's path, taking a shot in the shoulder. He is rushed to General Hospital in critical condition, and is gradually stabilized before undergoing emergency surgery.

In the November 12, 2012, episode Robert Scorpio reveals he had been imprisoned in Turkey.

In the fall, Duke Lavery comes to town and Luke is immediately suspicious of this man. He persuades a distraught Anna they should test his fingerprints. The fingerprints check out due to "Duke" having access to Duke's.? It is later revealed the man is actually Cesar Faison masquerading as Duke Lavery. Luke flies to Turkey, "Duke" says he was held prisoner in a Turkish prison, to investigate the mystery man.

Faison is finally revealed as himself in December and the real "Duke" is rescued. In February, Anna dumps Luke, believing Luke will always love Laura Webber. Laura and Scott Baldwin return to town and say they are now engaged. Laura is under the impression Luke has moved on with Anna. Luke figures out Lulu's present from the Valentine's Party is a knockoff of the Ice Princess. On March 6, Luke goes to see Laura and Scott and tells them his main suspect is Scott. Scott responds Luke is only targeting him because Luke can't stand seeing Laura with another man. After Scott says that he will throw him out and then says he will call security, Luke leaves. Luke goes to the Quartermaine Mansion and talks to Tracy Quartermaine. Laura and Scott go for dinner and they see Anna kissing Duke Lavery. They then head back to the room and they think Anna is cheating on Luke. However, Laura starts to think there might be another explanation.

On March 21, Luke Spencer, Laura Webber and Olivia Falconeri go to Dante Falconeri and Lulu Spencer-Falconeri to see the first ultrasound images of their new "grandchild" being carried by Maxie Jones. Lulu receives a gift from her aunt Bobbie Spencer that is ticking. Luke thinks it's a bomb, but Bobbie calls and says it's a teddy bear with a clock in it. It was a trap and Lulu goes missing. After Nikolas is shot while trying to say something about Lulu, Luke attempts to put adrenaline into his IV to wake him up. Laura and Bobbie stop him. A new lead comes up when the Haunted Star goes missing. Luke and Laura take off in a helicopter trying to track down the Haunted Star and Lulu. They find the Haunted Star and are subsequently captured by Helena Cassadine and her goons. Luke tells Helena about Nikolas, Laura is forced to call Scott Baldwin's cell, which Natasha "Alexis Davis" Cassadine picks up. Helena is convinced Nikolas is indeed in a dire situation. Helena tries to get Laura to shoot Luke's son Ethan Lovett and then tries to have him kill Luke Spencer. She mentions about the rape, cheating and producing Ethan, trying to inject Nikolas as motivation. Luke is able to get the gun from Laura and shoot a couple of Helena's goons and Helena herself. They presumed Helena is dead and see another boat is coming towards them. They have Ethan leave on another boat. After some struggle, they are transported to the Cassadine Island and Laura remembers the room they are in when they wake up. It is the room Stavros had her in when she was captive years ago. They get dressed and head to the dining room where they see a much alive Stavros Cassadine on April 10.

Luke, Laura and Dante rescue Lulu from Stavros's ice chamber. Lulu has no memory of any of them and thinks shes married to Stavros. They bring Lulu back to Port Charles and Luke encourages Dante to keep trying to get Lulu to remember. Luke and Laura bonded on their adventure and shared a kiss upon their return to Port Charles. Afterwards, they realized the romantic chemistry between them was no longer there. Laura went on to marry Scott and Luke wished them well. Lulu is able to get her memories back soon after.

In the weeks that followed, Luke's health began to decline. In May 2013, Luke attempted to revive his relationship with Tracy, who wanted more of a commitment from Luke than he offered, at that time. Luke collapsed while visiting with Tracy, and she had him rushed to the hospital. Luke insisted he was fine whereas Tracy believed that Luke's consumption of alcohol had caught up with him. At Tracy's insistence, Luke agreed to find out what was wrong and was stunned to learn he had been poisoned with a rare radioactive substance. After he learned the results, he received a posthumous message from Helena in which she admitted while he may have killed her, she retained the upper hand in their ongoing game. Helena went on to explain several months earlier, she had arranged for Luke's earring to be replaced with one that leaked the deadly toxin into his body. Helena's message also included a hint a cure did exist, but Luke would not find it in Port Charles.

==== The Real Luke Spencer ====
With Anna's assistance, Luke discovered Jerry Jacks had also been injected with the same radioactive substance, Polonium 210. Although Jerry was presumed deceased, Luke left town with the hope of finding Jerry and a possible cure. Luke's search for Jerry led him to Sean Donelly in Ireland and then to Cassadine Island where Jerry resided. When Jerry realized Luke had also been poisoned, he made Luke his captive and planned to test a small dose of the cure on him. However, Tracy sneaked onto the island and turned the tables on Jerry. With Tracy's help, Luke gained access to the entire dose of the antidote and they escaped. In 2014, Luke finds Carly tied up in the Quartermaine boat house but before he can rescue her Heather has her goons knock him out. Luke is later seen dressed in a wig at Miscavige to make him look like Heather Webber from behind. On February 11, 2014, Scott found him in a padded cell. On February 20, Anna rescues Luke and Scott but Luke isn't himself after Victor Cassadine is revived and became the new director of the WSB.

==== Luke and Fluke ====
Luke is released from the hospital after being rescued from the Miscavige institute on February 27, 2014. Luke has undergone a radical mental change unbeknownst to everyone. On March 6, after his recovery, Luke proposes to Tracy in which she accepts. He starts taking an interest in ELQ, and decides to work with Tracy. However, Ned Ashton doesn't trust Luke, because Luke tried to kill him after Ned discovered Luke having large sums of money in his office, plus Ned believed he would ruin ELQ, and tries to convince his mother Tracy not to trust him, but instead she tells him to leave the house.

It is soon revealed Luke is Julian Jerome's bankroller and the true head of the Jerome Crime Family, and wants to use ELQ to fund his drug operation and launder the drug money, and develops a penchant for younger women and hits on Kiki Jerome many times. Kiki goes to Ned and Michael Corinthos with the information. Tracy and Luke finally marry at the Nurses Ball in May, and afterwards Ned reveals Tracy has been fired as ELQ's CEO, due to the board voting her nephew Michael in as CEO as payback for her marrying Luke.

Later, Julian, growing tired of Luke's ambitions, tells Luke he wants to quit the mob. Luke later hires a gunman to shoot his son Lucas Jones and then tries to finish the job while he is at the hospital, but Julian sees him and stops him. On May 29, it was revealed the real Luke, drugged and weak, is being held at Miscavige. His kidnapper, later known as "Fluke", a Cesar Faison who looks identical to Luke, brags about his conquests with Tracy and how his family knows nothing about the truth. He then leaves and returns to the city. Fluke soon threatens Spencer Cassadine after he wants to hurt Uncle Sonny.

In January 2015, Fluke was suspected of possibly being Bill Eckert, but had denied it several times. However, on February 6, after conspiring to commit mass murder by placing a bomb in the Haunted Star while it was full of people, it was revealed by the police that the fingerprints of "the man we have in custody", who was presumably Fluke, are actually those of Luke Spencer. Meanwhile, in his cell, Fluke makes fun of all the theories people have proposed about his identity. Then, on February 9, 2015, it is revealed he is the actual Luke Spencer. He stands trial and is sentenced to Shadybrook after biting off part of Scott Baldwin's ear.

On March 30, 2015, Luke escapes Shadybrook with the inadvertent help of Franco and Nina Clay. They figure out he left to locate his long-lost older sister Patricia Spencer because she is the only one who knows what is causing his mental breakdown. He finds her in a convalescent home in Pennsylvania and gags her so she won't reveal anything. Later, he also holds Tracy, Lulu and Bobbie hostage when they show up at the convalescent home in search of Luke, but Tracy manages to break through his dark persona with words of love and Luke returns to normal. He has a tearful and emotional reunion with both of his sisters, but when some police arrive at the home, he escapes again, not being able to bear the guilt of everything he has done.

On April 1, 2015, he runs away to his old childhood home on Elm Street in order to remember what happened there that caused his breakdown, with Tracy, Lulu, Bobbie and Patricia chasing after him. While there he remembers on April 1, 1963 (which was the show's premiere date), he accidentally caused his mother Lena's death, and then he killed his father by bludgeoning him with a bat. His father, Tim Spencer, was an abusive patriarch and Luke was trying to stand up to him after years of abuse and lost control, causing the incident. Patricia confirms the story and reveals she buried their father's body in the house's attic with Bill Eckert's help and then sold the house to him in order to protect Luke. Luke finally breaks down in tears after remembering, has an emotional farewell with his family. Dante Falconeri, Lulu's husband, arrives to arrest him. He escorts Luke out and has him sent to a medical facility to treat his illness.

==== Saving Lucky & Jake's Return ====
After Luke is discharged from the facility, Laura returns to Port Charles with news Lucky is in danger. The two embark on yet another adventure, followed by Lulu and Dillion Quartermaine, to rescue their son as well as Ethan Lovett. Along the way, they face down old enemies such as Frank Smith, his daughter Jennifer, and Helena Cassadine. After they find Lucky, the group head to Cassadine Island where Helena has been keeping young Jake Spencer, whom Luke thought he'd killed in a hit-and-run car accident. Lucky confirms the boy is his and Elizabeth Webber's son, and the group return home to Port Charles with little Jake.

==== Leaving Port Charles ====
After Tracy files for an annulment, Luke attempts to reconcile with her, only to be rejected. Heartbroken, he goes to his childhood home with the intent of committing suicide but, after facing his past and saying goodbye to Bobbie and Lulu, decides instead it would be better to leave Port Charles.

In July/August 2016 while trapped in Greece, Lulu and Laura are told Luke died in a fight with the Cassadines showing a ring as evidence. While trying to escape captivity from Valentin on Cassadine Island, Lulu stumbles upon a skeleton baring an earring and wrist band similar to her father's. Sonny tells Lulu until a body is found, not to believe anybody. Later, a DNA test proves the skeleton is not Luke's. Robert Scorpio confirms to Laura he has talked to Luke and Luke is alive.

Luke is last seen on May 4, 2017, when he and Tracy meet by chance in Amsterdam. It is revealed later in the year Luke and Tracy are still together in Amsterdam.

On New Year's Day 2022, Tracy returns to Port Charles to inform Laura and Kevin Collins that Luke has died as a result of being killed during a cable car accident in Austria. Later, it is implied that the incident was set in motion by Victor Cassadine, in an effort to neutralize his old enemy.

== Reception ==
In 2022, Charlie Mason and Richard Simms from Soaps She Knows placed Luke's funeral as the "Best Send-Off" of 2022, saying "We still don’t buy that General Hospital really killed off Anthony Geary’s infamous Luke, but nonetheless, the character’s memorial was spot on. From the “party” crashers to the meaningful throwbacks, it was a feat of mourning glory." The following year, Mason placed Luke second place (behind Laura) on his ranked list of General Hospital’s 40+ Greatest Characters of All Time, commenting "From Mob flunky to mayor, Anthony Geary’s infamous alter ego was fashioned from a mold that was long ago broken, one from which sprang the kind of absolute scoundrel who is as infuriating as he is entertaining, as irrepressible as he is irresistible." Richard Simms from the same website wrote in 2021 that "Characters don’t come more iconic than General Hospital's Luke Spencer".
