= Lulu Spencer =

Fictional character from General Hospital

- General Hospital character
- Alexa Havins Bruening as Lulu Spencer
- Portrayed by: Amanda and Kerrianne Harrington (1994–1995); Clare and Maribel Moses (1995); Alysin and Kelli Griffith (1995–2001); Stephanie Allen (2001–2003); Tessa Allen (2004–2005); Julie Marie Berman (2005–2013); Emme Rylan (2013–2020); Alexa Havins Bruening (2024–present)
- Duration: 1994–2020; 2023–present (Note: From 2023–2024, an uncredited actress "portrayed" the role of Lulu, leading up to the debut of Alexa Havins Bruening in the role.)
- First appearance: August 8, 1994
- Created by: Claire Labine
- Introduced by: Wendy Riche (1994); Jill Farren Phelps (2005); Frank Valentini (2013, 2024)
- Book appearances: The Secret Life of Damian Spinelli
- Spin-off appearances: General Hospital: Night Shift
- Emme Rylan as Lulu Spencer
In-universe information
- Other names: Linda Carpenter; Detective Lesley Spencer; Lulu Falconeri; Lesley Lu Spencer
- Occupation: Journalist; Owner of The Haunted Star; Businesswoman; Assistant; Waitress
- Family: Spencer; Webber
- Parents: Luke Spencer; Laura Spencer
- Stepfather: Kevin Collins
- Brothers: Lucky Spencer
- Half-brothers: Nikolas Cassadine; Ethan Lovett
- Spouse: Dante Falconeri (2011–2019) (Note: Dante and Lulu divorced in early 2016 and remarried that same year.)
- Sons: Rocco Falconeri
- Daughters: Charlotte Cassadine
- Grandfathers: Tim Spencer; Gordon Grey; Rick Webber (adoptive)
- Grandmothers: Lena Eckert Spencer; Lesley Webber
- Uncles: Mike Webber (adoptive); Rick Webber Jr. (adoptive); Cyrus Renault; Martin Grey
- Aunts: Amy Vining; Bobbie Spencer; Pat Spencer
- Nephews: Spencer Cassadine; Cameron Webber (adoptive); Jake Webber (legal); Aiden Spencer; Ace Cassadine
- Nieces: Phoebe Wilson
- First cousins: Carly Corinthos; B. J. Jones (adoptive); Lucas Jones (adoptive); Valerie Spencer
- Other relatives: Ruby Anderson

Lulu Spencer is a fictional character from General Hospital, an American soap opera on the ABC network, portrayed by Alexa Havins Bruening. Previously, Lulu was portrayed by child actress, Tessa Allen from 2004 to 2005. The role was most notably portrayed by Julie Marie Berman from 2005 to 2013. Emme Rylan stepped into the role in 2013 and exited in 2020. Havins Bruening assumed the role in 2024.

Originally introduced in 1994, under executive producer, Wendy Riche, and created by head writer Claire Labine, Lulu is the only daughter of Supercouple, Luke and Laura Spencer. Sent away for her own protection as a child, the character is rapidly aged into a teenager in 2005 with Julie Marie Berman in the role. Lulu, much like her mother garners the attention of every young man in town from her stepbrother, Dillon Quartermaine, to the nerdy Damian Spinelli. From 2006 to 2009, Lulu is embroiled in a love triangle with Logan Hayes, the son of her father's nemesis Scott Baldwin, and mob prince, Johnny Zacchara. Much of Lulu's life mirrors that of her mother's, as she also faces mental instability resulting from the accidental murder of a loved one, in Lulu's case, her ex-boyfriend, Logan.

In addition to her early romances, Lulu is also known for the show's first onscreen abortion as well as her supercouple pairing with Dante Falconeri, and her rivalry turned friendship with Maxie Jones. Berman earned two Daytime Emmy Awards in the Outstanding Younger Actress in a Drama Series category for her portrayal of Lulu in 2009 and 2010, and a third for Outstanding Supporting Actress in a Drama Series in 2013.

== Casting ==
Since her on-screen birth, Lulu was portrayed by several child actors; first by Amanda and Kerrianne Harrington from 1994 to 1995, then Clare and Maribel Moses, from March 1995 to September 1995, next by Alysin and Kelli Griffith from 1995 to 2001, followed by Stephanie Allen from September 11, 2001 to December 23, 2003. Child actress, Tessa Allen stepped into the role on April 19, 2004, and last appeared on June 17, 2005.

Julie Marie Berman joined the cast of General Hospital in the fall of 2005 as a SORASed Lulu, making her first appearance on October 28, 2005. The casting immediately garnered much attention due to Berman's strong resemblance to Genie Francis who played Laura; Lulu and Laura's strong resemblance was often mentioned within the series. In July 2012, Berman informed producers that she had no plans of renewing her contract when it expired in November. Despite no official word from ABC or Berman, rumors began to circulate that Berman was about to vacate the role. After months of speculation, on February 26, 2013, an issue of Soaps In Depth confirmed that Berman was indeed leaving the series and had just filmed her final scenes.

On March 6, 2013, TV Guide's Michael Logan hinted on Twitter that an actor from General Hospital would be joining the cast of The Young and the Restless while a Y&R alum would be coming to GH. Meanwhile, Jamey Giddens of Daytime Confidential reported that several sources said Emme Rylan, formerly known for her role on Guiding Light as Lizzie Spaulding and The Young and the Restless as Abby Newman, had been cast as Lulu, but nothing was official at the time. Several sources including Soap Opera Digest later confirmed that the reports were indeed true. Berman made her last appearance on March 22, 2013. Rylan took to Twitter and confirmed her first air date at April 11. In February 2019, Rylan announced she had renewed her deal with the soap to continue her portrayal of Lulu. On December 1, 2020, after increased speculation, Rylan exited the role.

On August 5, 2024, TV Insider reported a casting call for the role of "Lauren," suggesting the details of "Lauren" sounded much-like the role of Lulu. The following day, Rylan verified the reports of the recast and expressed her disappointment in the decision, stating: "Although I am very disappointed with their choice, I am glad to finally have closure." On September 10, 2024, Daytime Confidential reported Alexa Havins Bruening was cast in the role; according to their report, Jennifer Landon and Marci Miller were also in-talks to being cast. She made her episodic debut during the final moments of the November 19, 2024, episode.

== Storylines ==
Lesley Lu Spencer is born on August 8, 1994, in Port Charles, New York to Luke and Laura Spencer. The character is named for her maternal grandmother, Lesley and the alias "Lulu" used by her mother when her parents are on the run from mob boss, Frank Smith. Laura asks her close friend, Tiffany Hill to be Lulu's godmother. Because of Luke's association with mob boss Sonny Corinthos, Lulu's infancy is plagued by danger, with her mother fleeing town with her at one point. As an infant, Lulu is diagnosed with aplastic anemia, forcing Laura to reveal the existence of another son, Nikolas Cassadine, born during her captivity with Stavros Cassadine. Nikolas saves Lulu's life with a bone marrow transplant, but Luke and Laura's marriage is destroyed by the revelation of this secret. After the divorce, Lulu is primarily raised by her mother, but Luke and Laura eventually reconcile and plan to remarry. When Laura appears to have murdered her stepfather, Rick Webber, she becomes catatonic and Lulu is sent to be raised by Lesley and makes small appearances between 2003 and early 2005. In November 2005, the character is aged to 17 re-establishing her birth year as 1988.

Lulu is reintroduced as a teenaged troublemaker sent to live with her father and stepmother, Tracy Quartermaine. Lulu and Tracy clash while Lulu falls for her new stepbrother, Dillon. She teams up with Diego Alcazar to break up Dillon and his new wife, Georgie. After a one-night stand with Dillon, Lulu learns she is pregnant and decides to terminate the pregnancy. Lulu is briefly reunited with her mother, but Laura falls back into a coma, and Lulu decides to help clear her mother of Rick's murder. In the meantime, she develops a close friendship with Damian Spinelli, the employee of mobsters Sonny Corinthos and Jason Morgan (Steve Burton). Lulu intercepts a letter from the late Alan Quartermaine to her father, which reveals Scott Baldwin as Rick's killer; knowing the trouble it will cause, Lulu keeps the information to herself. Meanwhile, Lulu falls for the troubled soldier, Logan Hayes, who is soon revealed as Scott's son. Lulu later discovers that Logan only pursued her as part of a bet with Maxie Jones and after dumping Logan, she becomes involved with mob prince, Johnny Zacchara. Lulu accidentally puts Logan in a coma, and when he recovers, he begins stalking her. Meanwhile, Lulu and Maxie begin working together as assistants to Kate Howard (Megan Ward), the editor of Crimson magazine.

After Lulu kills Logan in self-defense, she and Johnny go on the run and when they return, Johnny admits to the crime while Lulu is committed to Shadybrook. Scott returns, threatening Lulu with the death penalty for Logan's murder, spurring Laura to wake up and defend her daughter. Following her split with Johnny, Lulu begins bonding with drifter Ethan Lovett (Nathan Parsons) who is revealed as Luke's illegitimate son. Lulu attracts the attention of mob soldier, Dominic Pirelli and Dr. Matt Hunter. Lulu agrees to go on a date with Matt to the General Hospital Carnival, but he cancels at the last minute. After Dominic rescues her cousin, Morgan from being hit by a car, Lulu agrees to a date. Lulu is accidentally drugged at a Crimson photo shoot, and comes upon Dominic conspiring with Detective Ronnie Dimestico (Ronnie Marmo) and realizes he's a cop. He takes her back to his place where she passes out, and doesn't remember the previous night. While searching for a pregnant Carly, Lulu falls through the rotting floorboards at the old Zacchara home and gets trapped in the water-filled basement. Dominic gets in the water with her to keep her warm and she forces him to admit that he is really an undercover cop named Dante, and his mother is Johnny's new girlfriend, Olivia Falconeri (Lisa LoCicero). Dante is investigating Sonny for the murder of his childhood idol, Lieutenant Vince Poletti and fearing for his safety, Lulu tries to talk him out of it. Dante and Lulu go on their first official date to the opera.

When crazed artist Franco (James Franco) kidnaps Lulu and straps her to a bomb, forcing Dante to save her. Lulu questions their relationship after discovering Nikolas' affair with Lucky's fiancée, Elizabeth Webber (Rebecca Herbst). Johnny warns Lulu about keeping Dante's secret from her family and when Dante starts pushing her away, Lulu calls him a coward. As Lulu is standing up as the godmother for Carly's newborn daughter, Josslyn, Dante is shot by Sonny. Lulu professes her love for Dante before he goes into surgery and she helps Olivia reveal that Sonny is actually Dante's father. Lulu and Dante bring her cousin and his brother, Michael (Chad Duell) back to town to testify against Sonny and they are shocked when Michael confesses to Claudia's murder. With Michael going to prison, and the world against them, Dante and Lulu have sex for the first time. Lulu catches on to Carly's scheme with Brook Lynn Ashton (Adrianne León) to seduce Dante and break them up. The couple faces another hurdle at Sonny's wedding to Brenda Barrett (Vanessa Marcil) where it is revealed that Brenda had a child, and Dante pretended to be the father. Lulu's family is sent into turmoil when an intoxicated Luke runs down Lucky and Elizabeth's son Jake, killing him. Lulu and Ethan are in denial about their father being an alcoholic, but reluctantly agree to an intervention which sends Luke out of town. Lulu quits Crimson to run her father's casino, The Haunted Star, in his absence. She later follows Luke to a brothel in Florida only for him to reject her again. Lulu is about to be raped by the brothel owner, Javier, when Dante rescues her. After a run-in with Nikolas and Helena Cassadine (Constance Towers) in Greece, Dante convinces Lulu to go back to Port Charles. Lulu is furious when she learns that Dante has been hiding that Lucky has started using drugs again. After reconciling, Dante proposes marriage and she is hesitant. After several interferences, the couple finally marries.

Lulu ends up working as the evidence room clerk for the Port Charles Police Department and falsely accuses Detective Delores Padilla (Rebeka Montoya) of covering for her husband, Eddie, as the man attacking strippers. After Eddie's arrest, Lulu realizes Ronnie is the real culprit and he kidnaps her along with Samantha Morgan (Kelly Monaco), allowing for Dante and Detective John McBain (Michael Easton) to rescue them and kill Ronnie. Luke and Tracy are arrested in connection with the murder of Anthony Zacchara and Lulu maintains their innocence. Luke then mysteriously disappears and Lulu receives a letter from him which causes her to question her life with Dante; meanwhile, Lulu reopens The Haunted Star as a nightclub with Johnny as a partner, making Dante jealous. Lulu is soon revealed that Heather Webber (Robin Mattson) kidnapped Luke and forged the letter so his family wouldn't search for him. Lulu and Maxie convince the grieving widower, Dr. Patrick Drake (Jason Thompson) to face his drug abuse and check into rehab. Another of Heather's victims, Olivia, hallucinates Lulu being nine months pregnant after she is injected with LSD. After Lulu gets sick, Maxie convinces her to take a pregnancy test which is positive. The doctor tells Lulu and Dante that Lulu is not pregnant, and that the test may have been a false positive or Lulu experienced a chemical pregnancy, a miscarriage very soon after conception. Dante and Lulu then begin trying to conceive until they learn she cannot carry to term. They then enlist Maxie as their surrogate. During the pregnancy, Lulu gets a bit overprotective. In the meantime, Laura returns home and reveals that she is engaged to Scott. Lulu realizes that her mother only accepted Scott's proposal because she thought Luke was unavailable. In March 2013, Lulu and Dante invite their parents over to see the baby's first sonogram. After receiving a mysterious teddy bear with a clock, Lulu faints. Dante finds her unconscious and is then knocked out. When Dante comes to, Lulu has disappeared. When Dante finds Lulu at the Cassadine compound in Greece, she is cryogenically frozen thanks to Stavros Cassadine (Robert Kelker-Kelly) who has developed an obsession with Lulu. Though they are able to free her, Lulu has no recollection of Dante, Luke or Laura.

Despite the efforts of Dante and her parents, Lulu's amnesia remains persistent. Soon after, Lulu begins to remember details of her past in waves. Eventually, her memory is restored, thrilling Dante. They then proceed to make plans for their unborn baby. In September, Maxie has a C-section and becomes a bit obsessive with the daughter Dante and Lulu named Connie (after Sonny's girlfriend Connie Falconeri, who was found murdered months before). Both Lulu and Dante are alarmed when Maxie claims that Connie is her biological child. After much persuasion by family and Lulu, Maxie later recants and agrees to therapy to help her with her clinginess to Connie. As Maxie appears to be recovering well, Dante and Lulu agree to ask Maxie and Spinelli to be Connie's godparents. They both accept, but with less enthusiasm than expected. On the day of Connie's christening, it is revealed that she is indeed the biological daughter of Maxie and Spinelli. Lulu is at first in disbelief until Maxie confirms this and reveals that she miscarriaged Dante and Lulu's baby on New Year's Eve. She planned on having another set of embryos implanted in her, but Britt was unable to proceed with the procedure because Maxie was already pregnant from a one-night stand she had with Spinelli. Lulu is furious that Maxie lied and tried to cover it up. Maxie offers that Dante and Lulu still keep custody of Connie, but Lulu is unable to forgive Maxie and cuts her out of her life. Lulu wants to keep Connie, but Dante is unsure about this. He believes that since the truth is now out that Maxie and Spinelli might want custody. Lulu still holds Maxie to her promise of giving them full custody. Maxie is persuaded to fight for custody of her daughter and feels that Lulu should understand why. Lulu doesn't, and the matter goes to trial, where Lulu and Maxie slander each other on the stand. When Lulu is asked about whether or not she planned to flee the country with Connie to avoid standing trial, she denies it. However, when Dante takes the stand and reveals this to be true, the judge accuses Lulu of perjury. She and Dante are denied custody of Connie, breaking Lulu's heart. For weeks Lulu sinks into depression and blames Dante for the reason that they lost Connie. In mid-December, Lulu eventually agrees to try surrogacy again, much to Dante's delight. Sadly, Ellie announces that their embryos were accidentally scheduled to be destroyed and were now gone. Lulu is still determined to have a baby and makes an appointment with Dr. Westbourne to harvest more embryos. However, Britt tells them that she sees nothing viable in Lulu to produce any more embryos. This is the last straw for Lulu as she has a breakdown and (as she still cannot forgive him for them losing Connie), packs a bag and leaves Dante on New Year's Eve.

Lulu then comes back and makes up with Dante a few weeks later. In March 2014 they first discover that Dante is the father/sperm donor of Britt Westbourne's newborn "Ben". A couple weeks later they discover that Britt was never the mother of Ben and that Lulu is the real mother as her embryo was stolen by Dr. Liesl Obrecht and given to Britt. Dante and Lulu then bring their new child home and rename him Rocco Falconeri.

== Development ==
=== Characterization ===
As the product of the town's greatest love story, Lulu has a lot to live up to. Growing up virtually without both her parents hasn't been easy, but Lulu's slowly learning to move beyond her rebellious teen years. And while Lulu has admirers fighting over her left and right, the only guy she really wants in her life is her father.

The writers originally introduce the teenaged Lulu as being "very rebellious and independent and open-minded as well," leaving Berman and the writers a lot of leeway to develop the character and figure out what works for her. The character of Lulu is often very feisty, and can at times come off as fearless. According to Berman, Lulu is anything but fearless, though she manages to hide her fear by mouthing off. Most significantly, Lulu has problems keeping her mouth shut when she and several others are taken hostage by Jerry Jacks (Sebastian Roché) at The Metro Court Hotel in February 2007; Berman explains that Lulu's comments come from a genuine place of survival, and as long as she can help it, she will never appear weak. Being the first adult performer in the role also allows Berman to put her own unique spin on the character, giving her specific strengths and weaknesses, adding more layers to the character. Berman describes Lulu as being "young and naive" one day, and "extremely wise and mature" the next day. Lulu comes out of every situation, and hardship in her life having learned something which Berman believes makes Lulu seem more "human" as opposed to appearing as a "hero" or "anti-hero," she's right in the middle which allows for the character to be easily redeemed when she messes up. However, Berman has expressed her desire to take the character a bit darker. Following her first Daytime Emmy win in 2009, Berman describes Lulu as being "a bulldozer," being "unlucky in love" which makes the character so much more "endearing." Berman sees Lulu as being one of the few characters who actually learns from her mistakes and does not repeat them.

=== Relationships with Luke and Laura ===
Berman had the chance to develop and experience most of her character's relationships, due to Lulu being so young prior to the 2005 recast. However, the relationship Lulu longed for the most is with her father, due to him being absent for most of her life. Even when her mother suffers a severe psychotic breakdown, Lulu is sent to live with and be raised by her maternal grandmother, Lesley Webber (Denise Alexander). In the fall of 2006, Lulu is finally reunited with her mother, and just as she seems to have finally gained the family she's always wanted, she loses her mother all over again, making her very bitter. To make matters worse, Lulu finds out about Luke raping her mother in 1979, prior to them falling in love. "It hurts her to have to give up what she thought she had. So she lashes out at Luke for it. He's the one who had the knowledge and didn't relay it to her," Berman states during an interview with Soap Opera Weekly. Lulu's longing for a relationship with her mother factors into Francis' most recent return to the series in 2008.

It's a mother-daughter story. Years ago when I started playing the character as a 14-year-old girl, it was a mother-daughter story, only I was the daughter. So it's kinda cool this is full circle.
—Francis on her 2008 return

=== Affair with Dillon and abortion ===
Berman's Lulu has been featured in several major storylines, including her decision to get an abortion following an affair with her married stepbrother, Dillon Quartermaine (Scott Clifton). The plot involving Lulu would be the network's second time dealing with the issue, since Susan Lucci's 1971 abortion story as Erica Kane on All My Children. Though some critics and viewers disapproved of the character's decision, the show was applauded for being brave enough to focus on the issue, despite most of the genre shying away from the subject. Lulu's decision had lasting effects on the character, most significantly in the spring of 2010, when she must tell her new boyfriend, Dante Falconeri (Dominic Zamprogna), who was product of a teenage pregnancy, that she had an abortion. The emotional, conflicted performance during the storyline garnered Berman her very first Daytime Emmy nomination in 2007.

=== Other romances ===
Since the recast, Lulu has been written as the object of every young male's affection in Port Charles, Dillon included. Following the abortion, the two remain friends as Dillon tries to fix his marriage to Georgie Jones (Lindze Letherman). In the meantime, Lulu develops a close friendship with mob tech-geek, Damian Spinelli (Bradford Anderson) who gives her the nickname, "The Blonde One." Berman admits that she was hoping the writers would pair Lulu and Spinelli together, romantically, because it was so unconventional, and went away from the usual soap theme of pairing two very attractive people together. Though she was of a fan of their potential pairing, Berman acknowledges that most of the entertainment comes from Spinelli's quest to win Lulu's affections, and constantly failing, instead of succeeding. Lulu also catches the attention of bodyguard, Milo Giambetti (Drew Cheetwood). According to Berman, "She likes his thoughtful personality and enjoys his dopey, heart-on-his-sleeve approach. It's nice to be adored, and Milo adores her." Berman admits that she has never really been aware of the fans' reaction to any of her romantic pairings. In 2009, the trend of Lulu having more than one man vying for her affections continues with Dr. Matt Hunter (Jason Cook) and Dante Falconeri. However, Berman's pairing with Cook is written off as a brief fling and mild flirtation for the character to be officially paired with Zamprogna's Dante.

=== Relationship with Logan Hayes ===
"Obviously, Kin Shriner [Scott] and Tony Geary [Luke] have great history, and I think Julie Berman [Lulu] and I possess serious sparks. So the story won't just be between us, but the four of us - like trains colliding."

— Duhon, Daily News

In the spring of 2007, the writers began testing Berman's chemistry with newcomer, Josh Duhon as the mysterious Logan Hayes. Though Berman was not sure of the couple's potential, she labeled Lulu's trio of suitors, Dillon, Spinelli and Milo her "Three Stooges of Love" due to their wacky hijinks to get her attention. Previously, the produces had trouble finding a strong enough actor to stand opposite Berman, but Duhon was eventually cast in the role of Logan. During an interview with Soap Opera Digest, Duhon revealed that Logan was very much attracted to Lulu's strength as a person, as she had to deal with so much from a young age. One thing the characters have in common is that both of them grew up without their fathers. Throughout the summer of 2007, Logan and Lulu grew closer and when they finally start to explore their feelings for one another, Logan is revealed as the illegitimate son of her mother's first husband and her father's nemesis, Scott Baldwin (Kin Shriner). Initially, Logan pursued Lulu as part of a deal with Lulu's then rival, Maxie Jones (Kirsten Storms) to get Lulu into bed; if Logan succeeded, he would get Maxie as a consolation prize. However, Lulu had developed real feelings for Logan, as she realizes he is the exact opposite of his father, and Logan also fell for her. The most significant part of the story would prove to be their fathers' strong disdain for one another, and neither man accepting the relationship.

Logan and Lulu shared their first kiss in July 2007 only to be interrupted by Scott and her stepmother, Tracy Quartermaine (Jane Elliot), who also disapproved of the relationship. Though Lulu hates Scott, he is nice to her because Laura is her mother. Berman acknowledges that Logan actually being attracted to Maxie, but falling for Lulu, made the storyline much more compelling. Logan is torn, while Maxie has no idea that he actually has feelings for Lulu. Though Luke will never approve, he always lets his children "live and learn" and he would never risk his relationship with Lulu to keep her away from Logan. Lulu and Logan have sex for the first time in August 2007 and later move in together only for her to discover his tryst with Maxie in October 2007.

=== Relationship with Johnny Zacchara ===
A distraught Lulu found comfort in the arms of Johnny Zacchara (Brandon Barash) and the two bonded, as Lulu was attracted to Johnny's dangerous life style. However, after Luke skips town with a comatose Laura, Scott charged him with kidnapping; in order to get the charges dropped, and her older brother Nikolas Cassadine (Tyler Christopher) reinstated as Laura's guardian, Lulu promised to give Logan a second chance. Despite Logan's betrayal, Lulu still cared for him and tried to maintain their friendship. Also, seeing Scott willing to give up Laura for Logan to be happy, caused Lulu to see Scott in a different light, much to her father's dismay. Johnny enters the picture at a very convenient time as Lulu ran off with him to avoid facing Logan. Berman describes Lulu as being attracted to people with "baggage," as she can relate to them, due to her own chaotic life. Johnny is the perfect type of guy for Lulu because his life is one big question mark; she can't really figure him out, and in trying to find out more about him, she begins falling for Johnny. The danger Johnny brings is very familiar to Lulu. At times, he scared her, and was very unpredictable, but Lulu seemed to have a calming effect on him, which only strengthened their attraction. When the duo break into a cabin, Johnny pulls a gun on the owner, threatening to kill him, and Lulu is able to talk him out of it. A confrontation between Logan and Johnny was inevitable; "I don't think she intentionally seeks out Johnny to spite Logan, but they do keep bumping into each other. And if Logan finds out about it? That's his problem," Berman stated in an interview.

Johnny and Lulu officially began dating in early 2008, as Lulu suspected Logan of being the Text Message Killer and accidentally put him in a coma after hitting him with a wrench. Barash reveals in an interview that Lulu is very conflicted when it comes to her feelings for both men; she tries to do the right thing while also thinking about what is best for her. However, Logan waking from the coma complicated the new relationship even more. The writers then start to develop the trio as a triangle, with Lulu in a committed relationship with Johnny, while she harbors guilt about Logan's coma.

=== Logan's murder and mental instability ===
Berman expressed her hope that the triangle would go beyond the typical, "fighting over a girl thing" hoping it would eventually bring a sense of stability to Lulu's love life, as it had become quite unpredictable. The shocking outcome of the story granted Berman's wish. By late spring/early summer of 2008, Logan has taken a job working for Johnny's crazed father, Anthony (Bruce Weitz) in order to keep tabs on his former love. As Duhon's airtime continued to decrease, rumors began circulating that the character of Logan was being killed off. On June 26, 2008, Daytime Confidential reported that the rumors of Logan's demise were true. After witnessing Logan attacking Maxie, and attempting to call the cops, Lulu finds herself at Logan's mercy, and he ends up dead. Though the actual killer's name is never revealed, rumors pointed towards Johnny, who may have been trying to protect Lulu, or Anthony himself. That very same day, Soap Opera Network confirms that Logan would last appear alive on July 8. Regan Cellura of Daytime Confidential expressed her sadness about Duhon's exit explaining that the character had so much storyline potential being the son of one of the show's most famous characters. However, she also acknowledged that Johnny and Lulu were the more popular pairing, despite Logan and Lulu both coming from core families. After much speculation, Lulu killed Logan in self-defense when he attacked her. Lulu is so distraught that her mental health slowly begins deteriorating and Johnny, with Maxie's help, took responsibility for the murder. The couple immediately went on the run where they found shelter with a man named Sal (Rolando Molina), and his younger sister, Lourdes (Kristin Herrera). However, Sal eventually figured out who Johnny was, forcing the couple to go on the run again. They are eventually forced to return to Port Charles where Johnny is put on trial. During the trial, Johnny is threatened with the death penalty and a fragile Lulu takes the stand and hoping to clear his name, only to fall apart. Johnny's sister, Claudia (Sarah Brown) perjured herself, resulting in Johnny being acquitted.

"The thing that is interesting is that very similar situations drove them into the institution. Laura believed that she killed Rick Webber and found that intolerable; her mind just could not wrap around it. Lulu knows she killed Logan, so it's very much Lulu's terror that she is going to go down the same path as her mother."

— Guza, Soap Opera Weekly

Lulu's family has her committed to Shadybrook Sanitarium, the same hospital that cares for Laura, where she begins hallucinating a bloody Logan. The storyline allows for Genie Francis to reprise her role as Laura to assist Lulu in coping with her role in Logan's death. On August 25, Laura appeared to have awakened from her catatonic, and provided a listening ear to her mentally unstable daughter. A gleeful Lulu immediately tells her brothers the happy news, but Lulu's therapist, Dr. Lainey Winters (Kent Masters King) later revealed that Laura's condition had not changed, and Lulu imagined Laura's recovery as a coping mechanism; Lulu even goes so far as to imagine a doctor from a French clinic. Logan's murder mirrored the 2002 storyline involving her mother's mental breakdown. Though Lulu regains her sanity, Johnny has trouble treating her the same way after she nearly loses her mind, which leads to their eventual break up. "It's this constant walking on a tightrope that finally breaks up Johnny and Lulu."

=== Relationship with Dante Falconeri ===
Dante brings something different to her that she hasn’t had before. At this point Lulu is in such a different place. The timing of where her life is now, she is in a better place, and more mature.

— Berman, We Love Soaps

The most popular of Berman's romantic pairings proved to be with Dominic Zamprogna's Dante Falconeri and Berman's accredits the couple's popularity to her co-star. Long before the characters are officially paired together on-screen, the writers relished teasing a potential romance, and allowing them to get to know one another. Dante and Lulu meet for the first time on July 31, 2009, while he is undercover as Dominic, and don't go on an official first date until late December 2009. Berman appreciated the pacing of the story as it gave viewers a chance to watch, and actually enjoy their courtship. The couple shares their first kiss on August 26, 2009, after Lulu stops her con artist brother from cheating him out money during a card game. By the spring of 2010, the pairing had become a hit with fans and critics alike, considering they were the children of two of the show's most popular characters, Sonny and Luke. The couple's relationship is constantly tested, starting with Sonny shooting Dante, forcing Lulu to write him off, despite the fact that he has been like a father figure to her. Being Luke's daughter, Lulu grows up never trusting the cops, and depending on criminals like her father and Sonny for protection; according to Berman, Lulu is terribly confused after the shooting because Sonny's actions contradict everything she grew up believing. For the first time, Lulu must actually depend on the justice system. The couple's lack of "love making" became the focus of the media considering it went against the usual soap staple of a couple consummating the relationship, not long after meeting. In March 2010, Berman and Zamprogna appeared on Entertainment Tonight and gave viewers an inside look at the taping of the couple's first love scene, with the scene first airing on May 5. At the time, Lulu and Dante are two of the most hated people in town as Dante's law-abiding ways have landed his little brother, and her cousin, Michael Corinthos (Chad Duell) in prison. The consummating of their relationship occurs at a time when everyone else is against them. The relationship is tested again when Dante's past with Sonny's new wife, Brenda Barrett (Vanessa Marcil) is revealed and Lulu refuses to tolerate him keeping secrets due how secrets almost destroyed their relationship before.

"She loves him, but she's not sure she wants to marry him, because of his career and her fear of completely investing in someone she can lose. Then that falls into her other problem with marriage, as an institution itself. She's grown up with a lot of questions about marriage and whether it's really special, really means anything or is necessary. Obviously, relationships in Port Charles don't last, so she's right to feel skeptical, but deep down in her heart, she would love to get married and have it last forever. There are a lot of things she needs to accept, including the potential for things to not end happily ever after, and that's hard for her. "

— TV Buzz Marriage Q&A

In September 2011, Lulu begins dreaming about marriage and Dante even catches her admiring a wedding dress. Dante initially proposes on September 21 and Lulu does not give him an answer. As Lulu is finally able to forgive Dante for covering for Lucky's drug use, she sets up a romantic dinner, reminiscent of their first date to opera, where Dante is supposed to officially propose. On September 23, as Lulu is waiting for Dante to come home from work, she gets a call from his mother, Olivia about Dante's being hospitalized. After Dante wakes up from surgery, Lulu reluctantly accepts the proposal but refuses to acknowledge it. It is Dante's father Sonny realizes the reason for Lulu's hesitation and advises her to be honest with Dante, and herself, about her fears. Once Lulu opens up about her fears, she suggests that Dante take a desk job, which according to Berman, would cause Dante to resent her. Berman explained that it is not a question of how much Dante and Lulu love one another, but "I think it's about accepting that life is going to deal you cards and you've got to let the chips fall where they may, but it takes time to accept something like that, because it's not how she's wired." In early December, Lulu and Dante go their separate ways and she turns to alcohol. On December 16, Lulu has a change of heart and proposes to Dante and the two officially become engaged. Berman explained that Lulu understands that she must cherish Dante while she can, and not forget about all the possibilities. Lulu finally stops drinking making what was appeared to be an addiction storyline a very temporary way of not dealing with her fears about marriage. The couple goes on a weekend get away to New York City where they talk about their future and spontaneously marry on December 23, 2011, in a small intimate ceremony. Lulu takes a job as the evidence room clerk at the PCPD which allows for the character to embrace her adventurous side and follow in her parents footsteps. Lulu accidentally discovers that Dante's childhood friend, Ronnie had been attacking strippers. Ronnie kidnaps Lulu along with Sam McCall (Kelly Monaco) and they are rescued by Dante and John McBain (Michael Easton). The couple then begins trying to conceive and they learn that Lulu cannot carry to term. The couple briefly considers adoption until Maxie agrees to be their surrogate. As Dante and Lulu celebrate the unborn child with their parents, Berman's decision to depart the series was announced. Berman revealed in Soaps In Depth that her final scenes which culminate in Lulu's abduction hints at a recast.

=== Ice Princess revisit ===
Upon Lulu's disappearance, Helena is believed the prime suspect. In March 2013, Regan Cellura of Daytime Confidential dropped spoilers that Helena could be innocent considering she'd never intentionally harm her grandson Nikolas, who is shot when he tries to reveal Lulu's whereabouts. Cellura also hinted that when Rylan's Lulu made her debut, she would have problems remembering recent events. Rylan's introduction opens the door for the return of Robert Kelker-Kelly's Stavros Cassadine who has kidnapped Lulu due to his obsession with her. Head writer Ron Carlivati revealed in an interview with TV Guide that the storyline helped to "revive the Spencer-Cassadine feud in a big, surprising way for the 50th anniversary" following the onscreen death of Constance Towers' Helena. According to Carlivati, the dramatic rescue is only the beginning of the story. The "new Lulu" will not only affect her closest family, but also Maxie, whom everyone believes is carrying her child, and her parents relationship. Carlivati revealed, "Lulu's return has a ripple effect into a lot of storylines, and that will continue as we get to know this [Rylan's] Lulu!"

== Reception ==
Lulu's 2006 abortion storyline along with Berman's portrayal of Lulu during Genie Francis' 2006 return garnered Berman her very first Daytime Emmy nomination in the Outstanding Younger Actress category in 2007. She was nominated alongside her new co-stars, Francis and Anthony Geary who plays Luke. The storyline also showcased Berman's range as an actress from making Lulu appear very driven and determined and at the same time, to vulnerable and scared. In 2009, Berman received her second nomination in the category, along with co-star Kirsten Storms who portrayed Lulu's best "frenemy," Maxie Jones, for her work in 2008 when Lulu accidentally kills her ex-boyfriend which leads to the character having a mental breakdown. Billed by the academy as the "Sanity Shakened Lulu Spencer", Berman picked up her first Daytime Emmy. Berman joined the likes of her on-screen parents, Genie Francis and Anthony Geary, as well as her on-screen brother Jonathan Jackson who originated the role of Lucky, giving every family member an Emmy win. In 2010, Berman earned her third nomination and picked up her second Emmy win for her portrayal of Lulu who breaks up with another boyfriend following her previous boyfriend's murder. During an interview with Soaps In Depth Berman acknowledged her disappointment in her final scenes because it was clear the role was being recast. Omar Nobles of TVSource said Rylan's casting was "Awesome news!" and described Rylan as "dynamic" and "more than capable of playing Lulu's complexities." In 2013, she won a third Daytime Emmy Award for Outstanding Supporting Actress in a Drama Series.

On December 14, 2024, Soap Opera News named Havins Bruening's casting as Lulu as their top recast of the year, sharing the recognition with Cherie Jimenez as Gabi Hernandez on Days of Our Lives. The website complimented: "Havins Bruening has barely been on screen two months in the role of Lulu—but boy, did she come in understanding the assignment and delivering at that!" Michael Fairman named the casting of Havins Bruening in the role as his "Best Recast Female" for his "Best and Worst in Soaps 2024" listing. He called her casting a "pretty inspiring one," while also complimenting that she fit the role "like a glove".
