= Josh Duhon =

American actor (born 1982)

- Born: Joshua Wilson Duhon; August 27, 1982 (age 43) (United States) McKinney, Texas, U.S.

Joshua Wilson Duhon (born August 27, 1982) is an American actor. Duhon was born in McKinney, Texas, and stands 5'9”. Josh Duhon joined the cast of General Hospital in March 2007 as Logan Hayes, Lulu Spencer's eventual love interest. He left the series in September 2008 when the character was killed off.

== Filmography ==
- Boxboarders! (2006) (as Jason)

== Television work ==
- General Hospital (2007–2008) (Logan Hayes)
- Criminal Minds (2006) (The Tribe, as Rammy)
- Passions (2006) (Episodes #1804 & #1805 as College Guy #2)
