= Brytni Sarpy =

American actress (born 1987)

- Born: Brytni Melicia Sarpy; September 21, 1987 (age 38); Southern California
- Education: University of California, Santa Barbara
- Occupations: Actress; Model
- Years active: 2008–present
- Known for: Valerie Spencer (General Hospital); Elena Dawson (The Young and the Restless)
- Website: www.brytni.com

Brytni Melicia Sarpy (born September 21, 1987) is an American actress best known for her portrayal of Valerie Spencer on the ABC soap opera General Hospital, and Elena Dawson on the CBS soap The Young and the Restless.

== Early life ==
Sarpy was born on September 21, 1987, in California. Her father is Mel Sarpy and her mother's name is Kim. For most of her childhood, Sarpy lived in Sherman Oaks and attended high school in Upland. Sarpy attended the University of California, Santa Barbara and graduated in 2008 with a Bachelor of Fine Arts degree. Sarpy began auditioning for professional gigs and upon graduation worked several jobs to stay afloat. She worked as a bartender, a personal trainer at Equinox Fitness, and also did commercial work as an athletic print model.

== Career ==
Sarpy started in theater where she appeared in several main stage and local productions where she received critical acclaim for her dramatic range and comedic timing. Brytni is also a trained dancer. The actress currently resides in Los Angeles where she is represented by Pantheon Agency for theater and Vision Talent and CESD for commercial and print work. She has appeared in commercials and print work for Nike, Yahoo!, AT&T, New Balance, and several others. In 2010, Sarpy starred alongside Jamie Lee Curtis and Sigourney Weaver in You Again. In addition to auditioning for the NBC soap opera, Days of Our Lives, Sarpy had previously auditioned for the General Hospital roles of Taylor DuBois and later Jordan Ashford for which she was too old and too young, respectively. Sarpy later won the contract role of Valerie Spencer made her debut on March 20, 2015. In March 2016, it was announced that Sarpy was set to host the a new reality series The Pitch Room. In December 2016, Sarpy was dropped from a series regular to recurring status at General Hospital. In 2017, Sarpy starred alongside Heather Langenkamp in Truth or Dare. She was cast in the regular role of Elena Dawson on The Young and the Restless in February 2019. In March 2019, Sarpy announced that she'd also booked a recurring role on the new season of The Haves and the Have Nots.

== Personal life ==
Sarpy's parents split when she was about six years old and Sarpy was primarily raised by her father. Sarpy is very close with her father, who has Parkinson's disease. She has a younger half brother, Aiden through her father. Sarpy also has two other half brothers and a half sister on her mother's side. She got a rescue dog named Charlie for her birthday in 2012. Sarpy is also a pescatarian. She has opened up about her anxiety and depression on World Mental Health Day, October 10, 2018.

== Filmography ==
=== Film ===
Year	Title	Role	Notes	Ref.
2009	Awkward Courage	Love Interest	Short film co–written and story by Ryan Turner with Jameson Jordan and directed by Turner	
2010	You Again	Marcia	Comedy film directed by Andy Fickman	
2017	Truth or Dare	Maddie Sotarez	Horror film directed by Nick Simon	
2017	A Boy. A Girl. A Dream: Love on Election Night	Herself	Romantic film written and directed by Qasim Basir; Filming	

=== Television ===
Year	Title	Role	Notes	Ref.
2014	My Crazy Ex	N/A	Episode: "Flipped, Followed & Framed" (S 1:Ep 1 – Pilot)	
2015–2019	General Hospital	Valerie Spencer	Regular role from: March 20, 2015–December 2016; Recurring role from: December 2016–March 14, 2019	
2015	My Crazy Ex	Maria	Episode: "Duped, Doped and Delirious" (S 1:Ep 5); Also known as "Til Death Do Us Part"	
2016	New Girl	Babs	Episode: "Es Good" (S 6:Ep 9)	
2019–2024	The Young and the Restless	Elena Dawson	Regular role (2019–2023); Recurring role (2024)	
2020–2021	The Haves and the Have Nots	Rianna	Recurring role	

== Theater ==
Year	Title	Role	Notes	Ref.
2008	Plumfield, Iraq	Beth	Hatlen Theater: May 16–May 24, 2008	
2008	Much Ado About Nothing	Hero	Shakespeare: August 2–August 24, 2008	
2009	Time and the Conways	Joan Helford	Hatlen Theater: March 2009	
