= History of General Hospital =

The history of General Hospital refers to the ABC Daytime soap opera, General Hospital, a daytime American television soap opera. It ranks as one of the world's longest-running soap operas, and was in continuous production until the COVID-19 pandemic in 2020. Set in the fictional town of Port Charles, New York, the show primarily revolves around the lives and relationships of the people connected to the town's hospital. The show has aired over 15,600 episodes as of September 7, 2025, and has spawned several spin-offs since it was originally broadcast.

== Early years (1963–1977) ==
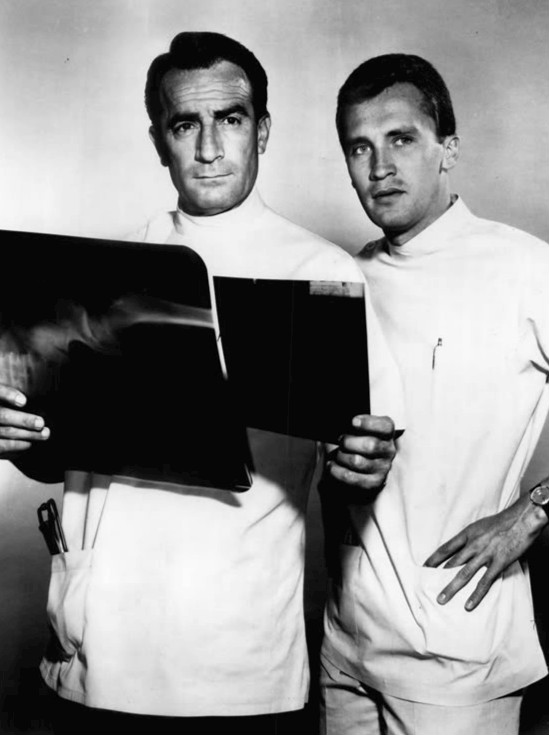
John Beradino's Steve Hardy and Roy Thinnes' Phil Brewer (pictured) were two of the leading male characters in General Hospital's original cast.

General Hospital was created by Frank and Doris Hursley and premiered on April 1, 1963. The first stories were mainly set on the seventh floor of General Hospital, in an unnamed midsized Eastern city (the name of the city, Port Charles, would not be mentioned until the late 1970s). "They had this concept of the show that it was like a big wagon wheel – the spokes would be the characters and the hub would be the hospital", John Beradino (Steve Hardy) later reflected to Entertainment Weekly in 1994. Storylines revolved around Dr. Steve Hardy and his friend, Nurse Jessie Brewer (Emily McLaughlin). Steve was Chief of Internal Medicine and extremely dedicated to his work. Jessie's turbulent marriage to the much-younger Dr. Phil Brewer (originally portrayed by Roy Thinnes; lastly by Martin West) was the center of many early storylines. In 1964, Audrey March (Rachel Ames), a former flight attendant and the sister of Nurse Lucille March (Lucille Wall), joined the canvas and started a relationship with Steve. Other notable nurses during the 1960s and 1970s included Meg Bentley (Patricia Breslin, later Elizabeth MacRae), Diana Taylor (Valerie Starrett, later Brooke Bundy), Sharon McGillis (Sharon DeBord) and Jane Harland (Shelby Hiatt). Meg marries Lee Baldwin (Ross Elliott, later Peter Hansen), who adopts her son Scotty and becomes his only family when Meg dies. Diana is torn between two men, Dr. Peter Taylor (Paul Carr, later Craig Huebing) and Dr. Phil Brewer. Sharon marries Dr. Henry Pinkham (Peter Kilman) while Jane marries Howie Dawson (Ray Girardin). In one fast-paced plot in 1971, Audrey is accused of murdering her son's babysitter and General Hospital was briefly elevated to the number one position, beating longtime ratings giant As the World Turns. In 1972, Howie Dawson becomes involved with Brooke Clinton (then Indus Arthur), who is found murdered the day after she spurns his advances. In 1973, Audrey marries alcoholic Dr. Jim Hobart (James Sikking) before finally realizing she loves Steve. Augusta McLeod (Judith McConnell) arrives the same year, bringing back Phil Brewer in an attempt to break up Peter and Diana Taylor. Augusta is pregnant with Peter's child. In December 1974, Phil Brewer is murdered with a geode paper weight and Jessie Brewer is put on trial. She is acquitted and Augusta is sent to prison and gives her son up for adoption.

Having been rated No. 1 in 1972, by the mid-1970s, viewers of General Hospital felt it to be glacially paced and the show was low-rated. Due to relatively easygoing choices in storyline, the show almost always lost out to rival medical soap The Doctors on NBC, which was considered by many to be more daring. Time magazine panned General Hospital in 1976, stating, "If malpractice is this dull, it is worth insuring against", noting the serial's saving grace was Dr. Lesley Williams (Denise Alexander). The introduction of actress Leslie Charleson (Monica Webber, later Monica Quartermaine) and actor Kin Shriner (Scott Baldwin) were also credited with aiding the show's revival.

With cancellation looming, Douglas Marland was brought on as head writer. Marland is credited for creating longtime staples such as the Quartermaine and the Spencer families. When he objected to a planned storyline that called for the virtuous Dr. Lesley Webber to cheat on her husband with David Hamilton, Marland was challenged to come up with a better idea. As a result, Lesley rejected David's advances and the enraged suitor began sleeping with her sixteen-year-old daughter Laura Webber (Genie Francis) instead. This torrid affair culminated in Laura killing her older lover after discovering that he was only using her to get back at her mother. This storyline was successful and as a result, Laura became a major focus of the show. Laura's subsequent storyline, a love triangle involving her, Scott Baldwin, and Bobbie Spencer, was also a success, but soon the success of both stories would be overshadowed by a phenomenon that very few expected, when Laura crossed paths with Bobbie's brother Luke Spencer (Anthony Geary).

== Cultural phenomenon and supercouple pairings (1978–1987) ==
Faced with threats of cancellation in 1978 after several years of stagnant ratings, ABC Daytime executives brought on Gloria Monty as executive producer and gave her 13 weeks to increase ratings. Monty had much experience in the genre from directing The Secret Storm for years. Monty is credited with increasing the pacing of the series, and introducing action adventure storylines, which General Hospital was first among soap operas to do. Reportedly not agreeing with the increased pace and also not wanting to relocate to Los Angeles, California where GH was produced, Marland left the series and was replaced by Pat Falken Smith. The introduction of the WSB spy agent Robert Scorpio (and later fellow agents Sean Donely (John Reilly) and Anna Devane (Finola Hughes)) led to several popular spy mysteries involving secret formulas, hidden treasures and world domination schemes. A few of these plots were considered preposterous, such as the 1981 storyline in which Luke, Laura and Robert saved the town of Port Charles from being placed under a deep freeze by maniacal Mikkos Cassadine's Ice Princess weather machine. General Hospital bounced back from the brink and subsequently became the highest-rated American soap opera from the 1979/80 season until 1988 when they tied with The Young and the Restless.

"In 1981, the wedding of Luke and Laura, both shady characters, attracted an audience of nearly 30 million people – in prime time, the equivalent might be a combination of a Super Bowl and the "Who shot J.R.?" episode of Dallas

— The Associated Press in 1988, looking back on the wedding of Luke and Laura.

The supercouple pairing of Luke Spencer and Laura Webber would eventually become the most popular storyline in soap opera history. Their November 16–17, 1981 wedding was watched by about 30 million viewers, setting a record for the highest-rated episode of a soap opera in American television history. Their popularity got the attention of actress Elizabeth Taylor (a huge General Hospital fan), who asked to be a part of the wedding. She guest-starred as Helena Cassadine and adorned Newsweek magazine with Francis and Geary. Rumors circulated that the wedding was not planned until Taylor asked for them to be married as part of her appearance, confirmed by head writer Pat Falken Smith as she left the series. Luke and Laura's relationship was not without some controversy, as Luke had raped her in 1979. Laura was traumatized and went to counseling, and eventually forgave Luke. Monty's comment on the storyline, as The New York Times quoted from a prior 1987 interview, "Some people call it a rape – we call it a seduction."

"Useless to resist. It is everywhere. On T shirts, umbrellas, potholders, even nightgowns, Puzzles, Piggy banks. At Harvard, where they had a General Hospital weekend. It is a campus craze, a teen-age fad, a licensing bonanza and the top-rated soap on the tube, leaving All My Children and One Life to Live in the dust."

— Time on the popularity of General Hospital in 1981.

Just before the wedding aired, head writer Pat Falken Smith and her team of writers angrily quit the show in August 1981 after repeated battles with Gloria Monty and ABC Daytime chief at the time Jacqueline Smith. Pat Falken Smith was also upset over the work done during her three-month absence during the writer's strike earlier in the year, claiming the Ice Princess storyline written while she was gone was, "the most convoluted, insipid, insane ... crappy idea in the world". In the plot, Smith's team left and went to NBC's Days of Our Lives. "Gloria's a genius—who runs a Gestapo operation", sniped Falken Smith in a 1981 People Weekly interview. During summer 1981, GH was averaging 14 million viewers per episode.

The success of Luke and Laura led General Hospital and other soap operas to try and emulate the formula. Under the reign of Monty, the series produced other successful pairings such as Robert Scorpio and Holly Sutton (Tristan Rogers and Emma Samms), Duke Lavery and Anna Devane (Ian Buchanan and Finola Hughes) and Frisco Jones and Felicia Jones (Jack Wagner and Kristina Wagner).

Exits of major characters like Luke and Laura, Heather Webber, Scott Baldwin and Dr. Lesley Webber contributed to falling ratings, although new characters brought in new fans to make up for those losses. Emily McLaughlin reduced the number of her appearances during this time due to weakening health but remained a strong presence when she did appear. Veteran actors like Peter Hansen and Susan Brown departed, although they would return on a recurring basis and later helped launch the 1997-2002 spin-off, Port Charles. But fans continue to bemoan the fact that others like Frank Maxwell, Todd Davis and Bianca Ferguson would not return after their late 80's exits, having contributed greatly to the show's supporting cast during its heyday. Lynn Herring was cast as a sexy new vamp, Lucy Coe, bringing both humor and scandal to her role of the husband-stealing character who briefly had a family written in around her thanks to her Aunt Charlene Maree Cheatham and Charlene's two sons.

The series also launched the media career of fitness instructor Richard Simmons, who frequently appeared as himself on the show who was a fitness instructor that taught an aerobics class at the town's trendy nightclub at the time during the morning hours, The Campus Disco.

== The transition (1988–1991) ==
As Gloria Monty left in 1987, General Hospital entered a transitional phase as the action/adventure storylines of the 1980s became less popular. H. Wesley Kenney took over as executive producer in January 1987, and for a while into his tenure, the show still capitalized on the action success of the past few years. In an interview with the Associated Press, Kenney said:

Lots of shows rely on character and romance, but what Gloria introduced was adventure and suspense, which no soap had ever done before. Last year we got to Nashville, Niagara Falls and Mount Rushmore. We blew up a whole mountain in Pacific Palisades. We had a snowstorm at Big Bear. There's a tendency for all soaps to go on location, but I think 'General Hospital' has carried it out more successfully. We use the remotes to push the story ahead rather than just as an excuse to get out of the studio.

In the mid-1980s, General Hospital introduced mob families, which played an essential role in the show, both past and present. The introduction of Duke Lavery (Ian Buchanan) brought on several new mobsters including the mysterious "Mr. Big", who turned out to be none other than police chief Bert Ramsey, as well as the Jerome family. Years later, when Duke was brought back from the dead, the new writers would re-introduce the Jeromes to match wits and automatic rifles with Sonny Corinthos just as the writers had done years before with the Cassadine family.

The show took a different turn when Joseph Hardy took over in 1989. In one far-fetched storyline in 1990, Robin Scorpio (Robert Scorpio and Anna Devane's daughter) befriended Casey Rogers, an alien from the planet Lumina. The show's ratings fluctuated; Leslie Charleson (Monica Quartermaine) later explained to the Chicago Tribune: "It seemed every year we were getting a new producer who brought in new writers. The writers wouldn't do their homework, then they'd tell us, 'Make it work.'"

In 1991, Gloria Monty was brought back to the series in an attempt to increase ratings. Not long after, the show lost major stars such as Finola Hughes (Anna Devane) and Tristan Rogers (Robert Scorpio). Anna and Robert had recently been reunited after having both been part of successful supercouples for the bulk of the 1980s. Although at the time some viewers felt the coupling odd, since they had spent the past decade as platonic friends, their reunion gave them a supercouple name for themselves. Hughes' departure was amidst rumors of Monty firing her, angry she had exercised her option to pursue prime time opportunities. Others however, said Hughes herself opted out early from her contract entirely. Rogers reportedly left due to unmet salary negotiations.

The much-heralded return of Anthony Geary as Luke Spencer's lookalike cousin Bill Eckert in 1991 was also not well received. Monty was fired in late 1991. While ABC declined to comment, a representative from another ABC soap was quoted: "She was hired [in 1991] to take the show from No. 2 to No.1, and instead she made it No. 7." Some credited the decline in ratings to Monty's focus on male characters, leaving the mostly-female audience without characters to identify with. Monty was also criticized for using General Hospital as a platform for a new series she was working on with ABC. Marla Hart of the Chicago Tribune described Monty's second stint: "She abandoned the soap's most endearing stories, inelegantly dismissed actors and introduced characters from out of the blue, until GH became one long non sequitur."

== Era of "womansense" (1992–2000) ==
"'Where are the kids?' I asked Jackie Zeman (Bobbie), 'Don’t you have some kids somewhere, where are they?' She said, 'We keep them in the basement.' She cracked me up, and I said, 'We need to get those kids out of the basement.' It's a family genre, it's very important that we meet the family, that we meet the generations in each family, and that we interface those families in the town."

— Wendy Riche on her first priorities when taking over as executive producer in 1992.

Wendy Riche came aboard as executive producer in 1992, at a time when the series was struggling. She told Entertainment Weekly: "I will say that the show needed to be more character-driven rather than plot-driven. It needed to be more relatable in its story pursuit. It needed to balance fantasy and reality better. And it needed more romance." Riche hired Claire Labine as head writer in 1993. Both were said to bring General Hospital into an era of "womansense". Under their reign, the series returned to medical focus and gained critical acclaim for its sensitive handling of social issues. Labine stated Riche said her first concern was bringing more depth to the characters, and making their family members seen, something the audience could relate to. She stated, "That's why we created the Karen/Jagger/Brenda triangle. To get some new young characters into the show who could relate to the adults, or who would be tied to the adults. That was a priority as well as getting the main characters back on track, like Luke and Bobbie."

In 1993, Anthony Geary reprised his famous role of Luke Spencer, along with Genie Francis as Luke's wife Laura Spencer and the addition of their ten-year-old son, Lucky Spencer, played by newcomer Jonathan Jackson. In 1994, Geary and Francis were invited to appear on an episode of Roseanne, as Luke and Laura, as Roseanne was a fan of the show. The couple raced through her house on the run. In return, Roseanne and her then husband, Tom Arnold were invited for a guest spot on General Hospital. Roseanne portrayed Jennifer Smith, Luke's ex-girlfriend and daughter of mob boss Frank Smith.

With the addition of Sonny Corinthos, played by Maurice Benard, in 1993, he was soon paired with Brenda, enticing viewers throughout the 1990s and reaching supercouple status. Labine credited the chemistry between Benard and Marcil as the reasoning behind the quick coupling. They were later involved in multiple love triangles, first with Sonny's eventual first wife Lily Rivera and teen heartthrob Miguel Morez starting in 1995, and later with corporate raider Jasper Jacks (Ingo Rademacher) after he joined the show in 1996.

"[The Nurses Ball] was something I wanted to do from the minute I got there. After I met with every actor I got to know who they were not only as an actor, but what their other talents were. I remember thinking, 'Geez, these people can do so much more.' So I always wanted to show off their talents beyond acting. And we did that with Claire. She loved the idea and embraced it totally! It worked for her storytelling in so many ways. Plus we got to really 'put on a show.' The work was hard, but everyone loved doing it. The actors, the entire cast, staff, and crew, all loved it."

— Wendy Riche on introducing the annual Nurses' Ball.

April 1994 marked the first annual Nurses' Ball, a fundraiser for HIV and AIDS awareness both within the storyline and in real life. Lucy Coe, played by Lynn Herring, founded the event. There was significant social impact, one reason being the current status of the disease. Herring recalled in a 2001 interview with USA Today, "Looking back on the early days of the Nurses Ball, we all remember what it was like for people with HIV or AIDS in the early '90s, and it wasn't very encouraging. We all knew people who had died or were dying from the disease, [in the days before protease inhibitors and anti-viral 'cocktails'] compassion was about all we had to offer, but it was sometimes in short supply." The story featured the NAMES Project AIDS Memorial Quilt, as well as coincided with the Day of Compassion, an annual day where all participating soap operas featured HIV or AIDS related topics.

May 1994 started the historic story arc detailing a heart transplant involving the death of eight-year-old B. J. Jones, daughter of Tony Jones and Bobbie Spencer, in a bus crash, and the subsequent donation of her heart to her dying cousin Maxie Jones. Later that year, Dr. Monica Quartermaine (Leslie Charleson) begins a long battle with breast cancer, which leads to her adopting Emily Bowen, the young daughter of Paige Bowen, who Monica befriends during treatment.

The mid 1990s saw declining ratings. All soaps lost ground at this time, one reason being the O.J. Simpson trial, which pre-empted an entire week in the summer of 1994, a loss that was hard to recover. Between January and May 1995, General Hospital lost ten percent of viewership. General Hospital faced scrutiny for attempting ratings with story arcs Time magazine called "morbid, publicity-conscious social relevance", including the recently announced HIV story involving Robin Scorpio and Stone Cates. In a 2010 interview, Riche recalls regretting having announced the story ahead of time, saying she thought "we'd made a big mistake by announcing it. We did a big press conference/announcement, and approximately 100,000 viewers tuned out almost immediately. ... those 100,000 might still be watching today. If we had weaned them into it they might have stayed around to see what happens, and gotten involved in the story and stayed with it. ... I imagine some tuned out because they thought it would be depressing when ultimately, thanks to Claire and her team, it was uplifting. So had we just let the storytelling play, I think we would have retained the audience." Reception on the social storylines was positive; in April 1995, Marla Hart of the Chicago Tribune deemed General Hospital as saving the soap genre. She described head writer Labine's impact: "Labine resuscitated the careers of many veteran ensemble players on this soap, forsaking the hunk and babe ratings game. And simply by being so bold in the 1990s as to give viewers storylines that pack an emotional wallop, Labine did what no one else in daytime is doing right now: returning soap to its core of drama. While the other soaps bend to sponsor pressure or obsess on producers' personal agendas, 'General Hospital' is keeping this ailing genre alive." The series won its third Daytime Emmy Award for Outstanding Drama Series that year.

"They didn’t want A.J. to be in question of having AIDS, or maybe not being 100% heterosexual, they just didn’t want to go there because he was a Quartermaine, which of course, is exactly why I wanted to go there."

— Wendy Riche on her initial character choice for the HIV-storyline, A. J. Quartermaine.

The previously announced HIV story unfolded, and was praised for the tragic love story of teenagers Stone Cates (Michael Sutton) and Robin Scorpio (Kimberly McCullough). Riche stated she had been wanting to do an AIDS story since joining the series, and prior to Labine's start, Riche had initially considered A. J. Quartermaine for the character that would contract the disease. A.J., already prone to wild behavior, would party with a male friend who had AIDS, and would not "remember who had sex with who, and what he did during so many drunken orgies." However, A.J. was also part of the white-collar Quartermaine family, and the network disapproved in letting the story turn that way. Riche also agreed with the network to some extent, in that she wanted the impact to stay focused on responsible sex and not sidetracked with homosexuality concerns:

The intention was not to make them gay, but the implication might have stirred up a lot. We could have asked, 'Why does everyone care so much if he was gay? Why does he care? How would Edward Quartermaine react and what would Lila do to bring the family back together?' We could have looked at it all. But it wasn’t about being gay, I didn’t want to be, 'Oh those gay people, of course they screw around so much ...' of some B.S. like that. AIDS is a non-discriminating disease, it doesn't care who you are or what your sexuality is. ... If we had done it with a gay character we would not have gotten the message of urgency across.

When Labine had joined the regime, she proposed the idea of Robin and Stone for the story, and by this time was ready to bring it to fruition. After a struggle that lasted throughout most of 1995, Stone dies from AIDS in November at the age of 19, and his death is followed by a fallout in which 17-year-old Robin has to cope with being HIV-positive herself. Sutton received a nomination for the Daytime Emmy Award for Outstanding Supporting Actor in a Drama Series, and McCullough won the Daytime Emmy Award for Outstanding Younger Actress in a Drama Series.

"Michele explained to me in detail what happened to her and how she reacted. We talked on the phone and we cried together. When I played the scene (where Lizzie is grabbed and dragged, fighting, into the bushes), it was so real. Afterward, I was kind of numb. My stomach was just in knots. Then, after it was all over, I went home and slept for 14 hours."

— Rebecca Herbst on the rape story arc of her character, Elizabeth Webber.

In 1998, the series revisited Luke's long ago rape of his now-wife Laura, something associate head writer Michele Val Jean had been thinking of since joining the show in 1991. Val Jean, who had been raped herself at the age of twelve, used her own experiences to bring authenticity to the story. The Luke and Laura rape-turned-seduction had always bothered her, Val Jean said, "I knew what I had seen on the screen, and it wasn't seduction." The series, that had turned perception this way after facing pressure from the numerous fans of supercouple Luke and Laura, now acknowledged Luke's actions as date rape without romanticization. In an interview with the Associated Press, Executive Producer Wendy Riche explained, "The times are different. What the audience perceives and what they expect is very different from what it was 20 years ago. They are more conscious date rape is unacceptable." However, she also clarified, "We didn't approach it as 'let's make amends.' We didn't feel guilty or felt like we had to." Riche ended by saying the ultimate message for the story was that, "It was not acceptable then, no matter what the town said or the press said. It is not acceptable to take control over another person's body under any circumstance." The story brought up the subject by using Luke and Laura's son, Lucky (Jonathan Jackson), and his soon-to-be love interest Elizabeth Webber, played by Rebecca Herbst. Lucky finds Elizabeth, a victim of rape, beaten and bruised in a park in February 1998. He subsequently finds out from his newfound half-brother, Nikolas Cassadine (Tyler Christopher) that Luke had raped Laura. Pat Fili-Krushel, then President of Daytime Programming for ABC Daytime, explained, "What we felt we should investigate is how, as the famous saying goes, the sins of the father are visited on the children." Head writer at the time Robert Guza, Jr. commented:

We are going to say, certainly, that the son is dealing with rape in a much better way, a much more appropriate way, and a much healthier way, than the father did.

Anthony Geary delivered a nine-minute monologue, without commercial interruption, as Luke tells Lucky about the night of Laura's rape. The revelation drives a wedge between Lucky and Nikolas, and such a wedge between Lucky and Luke that Lucky moves out of the house. The storyline won Daytime Emmy Awards for Jackson, Geary, the writers, the directors, and the show.

Riche helped bring the long-rumored spin-off (which was tentatively titled GH2) to fruition in 1997, which became the half-hour soap Port Charles. Guza, a former GH script writer, and head writer in 1996, came and went several times during December 1997 through December 2000. Guza was credited with shifting the focus of the series heavily towards storylines on organized crime, as well as mob kingpin character Sonny Corinthos. Meanwhile, ratings for all soap operas continued to drop. In 1998, viewership was down twenty percent from 1992, and between 1996 and 1998 each New York show had replaced its head writer and executive producer, some more than once. "It is almost as if the soap business is becoming a soap opera itself", said Edward Lewine of The New York Times, in an article where he quoted Michael Logan of TV Guide, who added, "The audience is gradually eroding. Everybody is panicked, and the result is a constantly revolving door of writers and executives."

With the departure of Sonny's love interest Brenda as Vanessa Marcil left in 1998, Sonny's romantic pairings did not take off until the coupling of Sonny and Carly towards the turn of the century. Carly Benson (originated by Sarah Brown), had been in town since 1996, making grand gestures to make her birth mother, Bobbie Spencer's, life miserable. In 1999, writer Patrick Mulcahey had admitted the writers were not sure which direction Carly was going in. Brown and Benard proved to have chemistry when tested on-screen, and their couple would propel them into supercouple status in the coming decade.

== New millennium, mob era (2001–2011) ==
=== 2001–2004 ===
In 2001, Wendy Riche left the program after nine years as executive producer, later recalling:

I was fired. But it was time for me to leave. I knew it, and ABC knew it. I knew personally it was time to move on. But I would have stayed there forever, I loved it so much. I guess I needed a push in another direction.

Riche was replaced by Jill Farren Phelps. During the first few months of her tenure, a number of "dark" storylines took place which earned a negative reaction for Phelps and new head writer Megan McTavish. In the wake of the September 11 terrorist attacks, ABC executives ordered less violence and warfare, causing rewrites and plot abandonments. One story, dubbed "Endgame", involved the culmination of the feud between the Spencer family and Cassadine family, a storyline which had begun in 1981 when Luke and Laura infamously defeated Mikkos Cassadine's weather machine. In the revival storyline, Helena Cassadine revives her deceased son Stavros Cassadine, who had been frozen through the use of cryogenics. The original script had Helena threaten the Spencers along with the rest of Port Charles with a biotoxin, which was quickly deemed inappropriate and dropped.

In 2001, Sarah Brown left the show and was replaced by Tamara Braun, however the coupling of Sonny and Carly remained popular. Original supercouple Luke and Laura finalize their divorce in 2001, meanwhile a bus accident that disrupted the Nurses Ball, an on-screen and real-life fundraiser for AIDS research. This marked the end of the annual event, that had been running since 1994, for the time being.

General Hospital aired its 10,000th episode on April 17, 2002, with an episode that revolved around the show's longest-running cast member, Rachel Ames. The episode commemorated her character Audrey March Hardy, celebrating her 10,000th shift as a nurse at the hospital. The episode was notable for showcasing the show's long history in a series of clips and montages.

Negative response to the series was seen in 2002 with the abrupt departure of Genie Francis (who plays Laura Spencer) due to contract negotiations. To facilitate Francis's exit, Laura kills her stepfather Rick Webber, leading to her mental breakdown and state of catatonia. Francis told USA Today, "I am not comfortable with the way it ended at all. They destroyed Laura." However, ratings remained stable after Francis's departure and climbed when Vanessa Marcil returned as Brenda Barrett in a five-month stint which lasted into the early months of 2003. Also in 2003, fan favorite character Tracy Quartermaine returned with her now teenaged son Dillon Quartermaine.

From 2003 to 2004, many long tenured cast members were taken off contract. In 2003, Rachel Ames, the longest-running character after more than 35 years, was taken off contract and put on recurring status. Around the same time, Brad Maule, who played Tony Jones, and Shell Kepler, who played Amy Vining, were also moved to recurring status. Also in 2003, Anna Lee was moved to recurring status after 25 years as Lila Quartermaine. During the same time, John Ingle, who played Lila's husband Edward Quartermaine, was fired from the show. The producers soon rescinded their decision and asked him to stay on a recurring status, but Ingle had accepted the role of Mickey Horton on Days of Our Lives, and Edward was recast with Jed Allan. Kin Shriner was also let go, who had been with the show on and off since 1977. Other popular characters, such as Bobbie Spencer (Jacklyn Zeman) and Felicia Jones (Kristina Wagner) also began to see less screentime.

"ABC's General Hospital has essentially turned into 'Sopranos in the Daytime,' [the story revolves around] mobsters and the women who love them. GH is already toning down sex scenes. I don't think they are currently pushing the envelope. Instead, they are relying on trying to show as much skin as they can as a substitute."

— Ed Martin, TV critic for The Jack Myers Report, in 2004.

As the series dropped to number four, it continued to be known for violent storylines, often focused on organized crime. 2004 marked the beginning of the series' month-long sweeps storylines. That February, the Port Charles Hotel Fire story saw the cast trapped in the burning hotel, including a location shoot involving a helicopter. During the ordeal, Edward suffers a heart attack, Courtney rescues a lady who later rewards her with large sums of money, and Scott Baldwin is presumed dead. That summer, while the 2004 Summer Olympics were screening on rival channel NBC, the show launched another major storyline that involved a masked serial killer terrorizing the Quartermaine mansion for five episodes. The storyline was seen as an attempt to lure NBC soap opera viewers, especially due to the similarities to the recent serial killer storyline that had taken place on rival NBC soap Days of Our Lives. In General Hospital's version, the killer is revealed to be Mary Bishop, attempting to kill Emily Quartermaine but killing Sage Alcazar instead. Mary is the widow of Nikolas's doppelgänger Connor, who tries to convinces Nikolas that he is actually her husband while he's experiencing amnesia. Emily tries to make him see the truth, causing Mary's rampage. The confrontation ends with Nikolas shooting Mary, who later dies in the hospital when her medications are switched by Lorenzo Alcazar, seeking revenge for the death of his niece Sage. The year ends with the wedding of Emily and Nikolas.

=== 2005–2006 ===
The first half of 2005 saw many cast changes for General Hospital. In April, Tamara Braun left the series, and the role of Carly was recast with former One Life to Live star, Jennifer Bransford. By the fall, Bransford was let go and replaced by former Guiding Light actress Laura Wright. Earlier that May, Kristina Wagner opted to leave the role of Felicia Jones and was replaced with former Another World star Sandra Ferguson. Also that month, the character of Maxie Jones was recast with former Days of Our Lives star Kirsten Storms, who took over for Robyn Richards, the main portrayer of Maxie since 1993. The character was slightly aged and introduced in a revisit to the 1994 heart transplant story as Maxie's health falls near-death. 2005 also saw the continued decline in ratings, leading to budget cuts and product placement advertising across all soaps. In February 2005 it was reported that General Hospital viewership was down 23% year-over-year.

In early 2005, Michael Corinthos and his siblings are kidnapped, and Michael's death is faked by his biological father A. J. Quartermaine. The story culminates in what appears to be Michael murdering his father, until Dr. Asher Thomas is revealed to be the apparent killer. Also in 2005, Nikolas Cassadine's doppelgänger Connor Bishop rapes Nikolas' wife Emily, eventually contributing to their divorce. Nikolas gets involved with Courtney Matthews, who is in the midst of a shaky marriage with Jasper Jacks, and they conceive a child. In October 2005, Lucas Jones, played by Ben Hogestyn, began to announce his homosexuality to his friends and family, but the storyline was ultimately dropped when Hogestyn left the series and the character was written off.

The November sweeps involved a large train wreck, and was the first story for Laura Wright as Carly. At the same time Kimberly McCullough reprised her role as Robin Scorpio, bringing along 1980s character Dr. Noah Drake, played by Rick Springfield, on a recurring status. Robin is soon romantically paired with Noah's son Patrick Drake, played by newcomer Jason Thompson. The following February sweeps saw General Hospital quarantined due to an encephalitis virus outbreak. While the virus killed off long-time character Tony Jones (Brad Maule) and Courtney Matthews (Alicia Leigh Willis). other veteran characters made guest appearances that year. The story briefly brought back Robert Scorpio, played by Tristan Rogers, who reunites with his daughter Robin after years of being presumed dead. Anna Devane (Finola Hughes) returned in May for the first of several brief guest stints. In the summer of 2006, the series focused on the issue of unplanned pregnancy and featured Lulu Spencer (Julie Marie Berman)'s decision to have an abortion. The show worked closely with the National Campaign to Prevent Teen Pregnancy to make the dialogue realistic, and the storyline saw ratings rise in female teenagers. In November, Genie Francis reprised Laura Spencer for the November sweeps; the character temporarily awakened from her catatonic state for an emotional reunion with her family. Laura and Luke Spencer remarry on the 25th anniversary of their 1981 historic wedding before Laura returns to catatonia. Francis won her first Daytime Emmy Award for Outstanding Supporting Actress in a Drama Series for this performance.

=== 2007–2008 ===
The February 2007 sweeps had a 24-style theme that took place in real time over 16 hour-long episodes. "James Craig" and a team of masked gunmen invade the Metro Court Hotel and hold everyone hostage, in an effort to steal a briefcase from the hotel's vault. He torments the hostages with a series of deadly games: Robin Scorpio is shot and Emily Quartermaine and Carly Corinthos are forced to perform makeshift surgery on her, while Alan Quartermaine, suffers a heart attack. Craig detonates explosives, managing to escape in the confusion. Jason is caught in an elevator with Elizabeth Webber and learns he is the father of her unborn baby. The storyline ends with the death of Alan Quartermaine following complications from his untreated heart attack, and Stuart was set to be fired. A veteran character since the 1970s, the character was written back on in a recurring status, appearing as his sister Tracy Quartermaine's conscience. Robin and Patrick's courtship continues, touching on her HIV-positive status and responsible sex, and leading up to Patrick's HIV scare after being cut while operating on a patient with AIDS. The story arc won General Hospital first place at the Sentinel for Health Awards in 2007. The series also won second place for Nancy Lee Grahn's performance as Alexis Davis battling lung cancer.

In September 2007, the Corinthos/Jacks nanny Leticia Juarez is the victim of a serial killer. In November, Nikolas Cassadine throws a Black and White Ball for his fiancée Emily Quartermaine, where both the killer and Anthony Zacchara wreak havoc. Emily is strangled to death by the newly dubbed Text Message Killer ("TMK"). In December, Georgie Jones is the next victim; afterwards her cousin Robin seeks comfort from ex-boyfriend Patrick, resulting in her pregnancy, the first HIV-related pregnancy for daytime. The TMK storyline carries on into 2008 as the killer hangs Cooper Barrett, then attacks and later kidnaps Sam McCall. It is revealed that presumed-dead Diego Alcazar is the killer, who accidentally hangs himself in the culminating confrontation.

I like it from an emotional standpoint. I also like it from a responsible standpoint. Twelve-year-olds shouldn't be picking up guns; I don't care if your father is a gangster. And if they do, there's got to be a consequence. We make directly culpable the people who love him most.

— Robert Guza, Jr. in 2008, then head writer, on the shooting of Michael Corinthos.

By 2008, General Hospital's reputation for mob violence was still strong. During the serial killer's rampage, son of mob kingpin Sonny, Michael Corinthos, purchases a gun to protect his family, and accidentally shoots Kate Howard, Sonny's girlfriend. Sonny tries to show Michael a life without mob violence, but Michael is shot by Ian Devlin in a plan orchestrated by Claudia Zacchara, with a bullet meant for Sonny. Head writer Robert Guza, Jr. addressed the shooting as his way of showing consequences for Michael's earlier actions, which had gone unaccounted for. Michael falls into a permanent coma as young actor Dylan Cash is let go from the series. When asked if showing consequences for violence was the beginning of less-violent plots on the show, Guza responded:

We're not going to make them all go in the garment business. That is not what this story is about. The show is about romance during wartime, for lack of a better term. We have the highest stakes possible because people can be killed. We're not going to ignore that. We're not going to go away from that. But we're going to make them very, very aware of the consequences and make them try to deal in nonviolent ways.

Meanwhile, Lulu Spencer accidentally kills Logan Hayes in self-defense, and her boyfriend Johnny Zacchara promptly takes the blame for her. They go on the run, but Lulu soon begins to break down over her guilt. She goes to get treatment, and is shocked to find her mother Laura awake at the institution. After briefly being kidnapped by Scott Baldwin, Laura leaves to receive treatment in France, and Lulu recovers and is released. At the end of 2008, Sonny marries Claudia in an attempt to get back into the organization. Robin and Patrick also marry; their first wedding is interrupted when Robin gives birth to daughter Emma Drake, and they are finally married the day after Christmas.

=== 2009–2010 ===
In the January 2009 sweeps, the hospital is quarantined after one of five toxic spheres detonate during surgery, followed by an anesthesia tank exploding, causing a fire that burns down hospital. The story is used to account for the new hospital set built for the show. Natalia Livingston, previously Emily Quartermaine, returned during this time as Rebecca Shaw, later to be found as Emily's twin sister sold at birth. Ethan Lovett also arrives, later proven to be the son of Holly Sutton and Luke Spencer. In April, Robin Scorpio suffers from postpartum depression. In May, a SORAS teenaged recast Michael Corinthos (now Drew Garrett) wakes up from coma after an experimental surgery, experiencing anger issues. Similarly aged characters Kristina Davis (now Lexi Ainsworth) and Morgan Corinthos are recast as well. A car driven by Edward Quartermaine crashes into the hospital carnival, wreaking havoc.

Both Michael and Kristina think they cause an accident that results in their now-stepmother Claudia Zacchara losing her baby, and run off to Mexico. Jason Morgan and Sam find them, rekindling their relationship during the trip. Sonny finds out Claudia was responsible for Michael getting shot, and publicly verbally abuses her, leading to her kidnapping Carly Corinthos, causing Carly to go into labor. Michael ends up finding them, and accidentally killing Claudia to save Carly and his baby sister Josslyn. At the end of 2009, crazed artist Robert 'Franco' Frank (played by actor James Franco), comes to town and is shown to be obsessed with Jason Morgan. He kidnaps Sam, Lulu and Carly, who are saved shortly before he leaves town. The end of 2009 also brought back fan favorite and original portrayer Jonathan Jackson as Lucky Spencer, and new character Lisa Niles, briefly portrayed by Julie Mond, as Patrick's ex-girlfriend from college.

In the beginning of 2010, Sonny shoots undercover cop Dominic Perelli, who turns out to be his son Dante Falconeri. Meanwhile, Elizabeth cheats on Lucky Spencer with his brother Nikolas Cassadine and becomes pregnant. The baby is Lucky's, but Helena Cassadine changes the paternity results to say that it is Nikolas's son. Also in early 2010, Kristina's is attacked by her boyfriend Kiefer Bauer, but lies and says it was Ethan Lovett. While driving Kristina to the hospital, Alexis hits Kiefer with her car, but is in a state of shock and keeps driving. Kiefer dies from his injuries. Sonny goes on trial for Claudia's murder, but Dante learns Michael (now being played by another recast Chad Duell) killed her and he is sent to prison. Jason voluntarily goes to prison to protect Michael. Eventually Michael is released from prison, and Jason soon after. Carly vows to get revenge against Dante, and tries to break up Dante and Lulu by hiring Brook Lynn Ashton to seduce him. Meanwhile, Franco returns and kidnaps Elizabeth's newborn son, Aiden, causing the hospital to be locked down. Kiefer's father tries to take revenge, shooting Mac and Ethan before attempting to shoot Kristina. Mac kills Warren. Lucky eventually finds the baby and returns him to Liz, and Franco escapes.

In June 2010, Patrick and Lisa sleep together. Lisa tries to get rid of Robin several times, and eventually Patrick confesses to Robin. Lisa traps Robin in a well where she has a vision of her first love Stone Cates. Meanwhile, Sonny tries to kill Johnny with a car bomb and Kristina gets caught in the crossfire. Brenda Barrett, living in Rome, is being stalked by a criminal called The Balkan so Jason brings her back to Port Charles. Meanwhile, Lucky is hired by Interpol to go to Ireland and take the identity of Ronan O'Reilly, a hit man working for The Balkan. Lucky meets Siobhan McKenna, and returns to Port Charles with her. It is revealed that Dante guarded Brenda in 2007 and helped her cover up the murder of The Balkan's son. Brenda is almost kidnapped and kills a man working for The Balkan in order to save Dante. Johnny Zacchara starts blackmailing Lisa, and they begin a romantic relationship amidst her obsession with Patrick. It is revealed that Jerry Jacks and Siobhan both work for The Balkan. Meanwhile, Theo Hoffman, the new attorney representing Brenda and Dante, is revealed to be The Balkan. Luke and Tracy get married on December 21, after Luke meets her many demands. During the reception, Sonny proposes to Brenda.

=== 2011 ===
In late 2010 into early 2011, a bus going on the hospital ski trip crashes. Michael continues his friendship with Abby, an exotic dancer, who is almost raped by her ex-boyfriend before she is saved by Michael. The ordeal leads to Michael later admitting to Jason that he was raped by Carter in prison. Meanwhile, Theo is able to become Brenda and Dante's lawyer and it is revealed that Theo's wife is Suzanne. On Sonny and Brenda's wedding day, Brenda is forced to admit she miscarried a baby that was Alexander's. She gets into a limo that blows up, and it is revealed that Sam was inside the limo instead. She is able to recover after experiencing temporary deafness. Brenda is seen waking up next to Theo. With the help of Shawn Butler, Brenda is found. Theo injects her with poison, allowing him and Suzanne to escape. Suzanne kills Theo, and brings Brenda her son Lucian, meanwhile it is revealed her real son is elsewhere. Lucien is kidnapped by Suzanne, and when Suzanne is found they find Brenda's real son, named Alec.

Michael is intent on making his way into the family business. Carly breaks up with Jacks when she finds out he went to England to help Brenda. Jax plans on gaining full custody of Josslyn, meanwhile she falls ill and is hospitalized. Robin, Lisa, Sam, Carly and Luke are all on the road when Jake Spencer is injured in a hit-and-run. He is pronounced brain-dead meanwhile Josslyn is diagnosed with kidney cancer. Lucky and Elizabeth agree to donate Jake's kidney to Josslyn. It is revealed that Luke hit Jake, and Lucky accuses him of drunk driving. Lucky forces an intervention, but Luke is not swayed. When Luke scares Lulu and punches Lucky, he goes to rehab but checks out the same day. Liz gets another paternity test that proves Lucky, not Nikolas, is Aiden's father, meanwhile Siobhan and Lucky get married so she can stay in the country. Liz keeps Aiden's paternity a secret, meanwhile, she starts messing up at work and hallucinating Jake.

Abby's ex-boyfriend Brandon is found dead and Anthony frames Abby. Lisa befriends Kristina and gives her hydrocodone masked as herbal supplements, then sneaks around Robin and Patrick's house while Kristina is passed out babysitting. Lisa attempts to trap Robin in the basement and frame Patrick for her death. Robin and Patrick catch her in the act and Lisa is arrested. Lisa breaks out of prison and goes to Johnny for help. Eventually, Anthony helps her. Meanwhile, Lulu buys The Haunted Star, hoping to entice Luke back. Lucky finds Luke in the bordello he grew up in. Luke tells Lucky that Jake's death liberated him. Lucky returns to Port Charles, and torches the old Spencer house, accidentally injuring Siobhan. Meanwhile, Lisa enters the hospital and they go into lockdown. Liz is trapped in Siobhan's operating room, and accidentally gives Siobhan the wrong medication. Lisa takes Maxie, Steve, Robin, and Patrick hostage and performs a mock trial. Spinelli comes through the air vent and takes a bullet for Maxie. Jason and Dante lift the lockdown, and Dante knocks Lisa out. While everyone is distracted saving Spinelli, Lisa regains consciousness and holds a syringe filled with drain cleaner to Robin's neck. Patrick tackles her, and Lisa lets him stab her with the syringe. Spinelli wakes up, but is acting like the 'Jackal P.I.' character from his book.

Liz tells Lucky about Aiden to keep him from drinking after the guilt of Siobhan's accident. Nikolas does not believe her and briefly plans to take Aiden out of the country before returning him. He says goodbye with Lucky before leaving town. Lucky forgives Elizabeth for her medication mistake but does not. Lulu goes to the bordello in Florida to find Luke, and starts working for Javier to get information. Dante arrives to find Lulu and is hired as a bouncer. Javiar finds out who they really are and Dante saves Lulu from being killed by Javiar. Meanwhile, Sam accepts a marriage proposal from Jason, and Sonny learns Jax bribed the mediator in his custody suit for Josslyn. Sonny frames Jax for drug use and Carly is given full custody of Josslyn. Brenda leaves Sonny for what he did.

Lucky volunteers for an undercover drug case which worries Siobhan. Elizabeth is supportive and tries to help him get information from the hospital. Lucky is injected with drugs under the order of Anthony Zacchara. Liz finds him and goes for medication. Lucky leaves and goes to the church and hallucinates the night he and Liz said their vows as teenagers. Elizabeth is confronted by Siobhan and they fight before getting into a car accident with Jason and Carly. Siobhan and Jason are in critical condition. At the same time, Jax breaks into the house and takes Josslyn. Liz finds Lucky and gives him medication. Sonny finds out about Jax taking Josslyn, and hunts after him. He finds them at Robin's house and accidentally shoots Robin. Jax leaves and his plan crashes after being tampered with by Sonny. Carly tells Sonny that he is no longer a part of her life, meanwhile Skye finds Jax and helps him. Anthony kills Siobhan in the hospital. Lucky finds Siobhan dead and takes pills.

Jason requires life and death surgery. During the procedure, the women in Jason's life, Sam, Monica, Carly and Liz fantasize how their relationships with him would be different if not for his previous car accident and head injury years prior. As Jason recovers, Spinelli shares an emotional visit with him, leading him to a breakthrough with losing the 'Jackal P.I.' persona. When Lulu learns of Lucky's drug use, she has an emotional fight with him. Meanwhile, Kristina falls unconscious and learns she may become paralyzed due to the car bomb accident the year prior. Later, Kristina gets feeling back in her legs. Liz and Maxie are kidnapped by Anthony's men. Lucky finds Elizabeth and shoots her kidnapper, while Spinelli finds and helps Maxie. Anthony pays for an experimental operation that wakes Lisa up from her coma. Jason and Sam elope the night before their wedding, and during their reception the next day, Franco watches from video cameras. Meanwhile, Dante goes to Sonny's warehouse and is shot by Anthony. Lulu doubts her ability to have a relationship with a cop, and blames Lucky for not being there to help Dante.

Lisa Niles sneaks onto Matt's party boat. She kills the first mate and strands the boat at sea. She pushes Elizabeth overboard, and drugs Patrick and Robin in order to tie them up. She tries to inject Patrick with Robin's blood but they are able to get away. Lisa's dead body is found and everyone on board is a suspect. On Jason and Sam's honeymoon, Franco locks Jason in a room and makes him watch as he goes after Sam, leading them both to believe that he raped her.

== Remodeling and resurgence (2012–present) ==
"If I spent any energy worrying about whether we were getting cancelled, it would take away from making the show the best that it could possibly could be. When you’re running, don’t look behind you."

— Frank Valentini in December 2011, on the prospect of cancellation.

By early 2012, both other ABC Daytime soap operas had been cancelled, All My Children ending in September 2011, and One Life to Live's scheduled final air date on January 13, 2012. On January 9, 2012, former One Life To Live executive producer Frank Valentini officially replaced Jill Farren Phelps as the executive producer of General Hospital, while former OLTL head writer Ron Carlivati replaced Garin Wolf and Shelly Altman as head writers, who were both demoted to part of the back-up writing staff before being eventually fired from the show later that year. They had previously been hired as co-head writers replacing Bob Guza during the late summer and fall of 2011. Prior to joining GH, Valentini and Carlivati helped wrap up OLTL after its cancellation and subsequent transition to Prospect Park's online venture failed to happen. In the wake of the other cancelled series on ABC, and the low ratings of General Hospital itself, there was speculation that the new regime was an attempt by the network to save General Hospital from the same fate, some comparing it to the hiring of Gloria Monty in 1978.

The change in staff occurred amidst key story arcs. In January 2012, Sam learns she is pregnant with either Jason or Franco's child. Jason kills Franco, in James Franco's last guest appearance, and Sam learns that Jason and Franco are twins and Franco is allegedly the father of her baby. There were two major February sweeps events. The first was the death of Robin Scorpio-Drake, played by Kimberly McCullough on and off since 1985, who had chosen to leave to pursue directing opportunities. Robin dies in a lab explosion, and Valentini received praise for bringing high-profile legacy characters back in the fallout, such as Anna Devane (Finola Hughes), Robert Scorpio (Tristan Rogers) and Holly Sutton (Emma Samms). New head writer Ron Carlivati took the writing over the day after the explosion, immediately turning the story around. He explained, "In the overall general landscape of daytime, with these shows going off the air and soap fans feeling so lost and disenfranchised and giving up hope for their shows, I wanted there to [be] hope that this was not the end of Robin's story." A few months later, it is revealed that Robin is alive and being held captive at an undisclosed location. The other sweeps event was the catalyst for ushering in the former One Life to Live cast members who had signed on with GH. Cole Thornhart, Starr Manning (Kristen Alderson) and baby Hope Manning-Thornhart are in a car crash involving Anthony Zacchara that kills Cole and Hope. The aftermath brings Starr's mother Blair Cramer (Kassie DePaiva) and father Todd Manning (Roger Howarth) to town, and the latter promptly sets roots by buying the local newspaper and television station. Meanwhile, John McBain (Michael Easton) arrives in town, investigating Sonny Corinthos in the death of his sister. Sonny is put on trial for the car accident, introducing Starr to his son Michael, who become close and start dating months later. Valentini explained the integration of the characters:

We brought on characters that didn’t duplicate the characters on 'General Hospital.' I think there’s no one like Todd. There’s no one like John. And I believe that the PCPD needs some reinforcement and some beefing up. I love Dante. He’s great. He needs another good cop with him. Michael (Easton) and Dominic (Zamprogna) have such great chemistry with each other. Again, it's always been one of those things where it goes back to 'General Hospital' to support the show. Anna [Devane] and John have a friendship. Sonny (Maurice Benard) and John have an adversarial relationship, but you’ll see them connect in lots of ways over the next couple months and that’s exciting. Todd (Roger Howarth) and Carly (Laura Wright), I think, are really fun together and provide another arena within which to have some comedy. So as opposed to bringing on new people that no one knows, we brought on really good actors. No one can argue, whether you like them or not, Michael, Kristen (Alderson) and Roger are phenomenal actors.

Meanwhile, Maxie Jones, reeling from guilt over thinking she caused the lab explosion that killed her cousin Robin, falsely confesses to the murder of Lisa Niles and goes to jail. Eventually it comes out that Matt Hunter is the killer, and Maxie is released. Sam gives birth the same day as (another character crossed-over from OLTL) Téa Delgado (Florencia Lozano), both stranded in the woods. Téa's baby is stillborn, but is switched with Sam's son by Heather Webber and Todd Manning. Téa leaves town with the healthy child while Todd finds out from Heather that Jason is the true biological father of the baby. Being blackmailed by Heather, he keeps the secret. After the series was renewed for another year in April, General Hospital cast were invited to the Television Critics Association press conference that summer. A few months under his belt, Valentini said his work was:

... not rebuilding, but maybe remodeling. Being an outsider, I think it's sometimes easier to come in and see what maybe you are not used to seeing when you are there. I think the show was in terrific shape, but there needed to be some tweaks. And I think it's much more my taste, my sensibility, for the show to go just a little bit faster, but I thought there were some key characters missing, not in terms of who they were, but certain archetypes that were really important to bring on the show.

Valentini also promoted an upcoming umbrella story leading up to the show's September time slot change, that made room for Katie Couric's talk show, Katie. The story involved the reappearance of Robin, who viewers see being held by Ewen Keenan, later revealed to be working for Jerry Jacks. Jerry poisons the town's water supply with the help of Joe Scully, Jr., who is found to be the real killer of McBain's sister. Joe also convinces his son, Trey Mitchell, to marry Sonny's daughter Kristina Davis for revenge. Trey is revealed to be the son of Kate Howard, who had been raped by Joe when they were teenagers, who regresses completely into her alternate personality 'Connie'. Joe is seen to be working for Duke Lavery, who had been presumed dead for decades. Meanwhile, Jason investigates the death of Sam's child, leading to her reunion with her son, who they name Daniel Edward Morgan. Duke is involved in a shootout that kills Bernie Abrahms and Joe, while Jason Morgan is presumed dead after being shot into the harbor. Soon after Duke is seen holding Robin captive, it is revealed he is actually Cesar Faison, who is holding the real Duke captive as well. Sam learns that Jason is Danny's biological father, while too late to tell Jason, she is able to introduce him to great grandfather Edward Quartermaine shortly before he dies, following the death of actor John Ingle.

"I think the feel-good philanthropic aspect of the show was missing. ... We celebrate the hospital and the people who are the do-gooders. For a long time the moral compass of the show was off a little bit, and I think now we're back to where it needs to be."

— Frank Valentini on the revival of the Nurses' Ball.

Meanwhile, new student nurses Sabrina Santiago and Felix DuBois plan with Elizabeth Webber to revive the old annual Nurses' Ball. Valentini had hinted at the return of the ball a few months prior at the annual GH Fan Club Weekend, stating "I'll just say this, I love music and I love Nurses." Valentini later confirmed the revival of the ball, scheduled to coincide with the series' 50th anniversary on April 1, 2013. Lynn Herring reprised her character of Lucy Coe as the series continued to bring back numerous legacy characters and fan favorites. Lucy returns to help Sabrina find funding for the ball. By the end of 2012, rating for General Hospital rose to over three million, the highest in two years. Ratings in the target demographic of women 18 to 34 years old were reported to have risen 44% year over year. MSN Money cited General Hospital as leading a revival of the soap opera genre, stating, "Soap fans say the reason for GH's resurgence is simple: The show got a lot better." Michael Logan of TV Guide named General Hospital the best soap of 2012, stating, "This time last year, General Hospital was considered dead as disco, a show merely waiting to be officially canceled by ABC. ... GH was handed to OLTL's head writer, Ron Carlivati, and exec producer Frank Valentini, who quickly amped up the action, humor and romance and energized the cast by adding top stars from GH's past as well as popular refugees from Llanview. Voilà! Dreary, messy GH was suddenly a thrilling, surprise-packed, can't-miss experience." The series gained more press in early January when it was announced Genie Francis would reprise her role as Laura Spencer for an unknown length of time.

"We can't say that 'General Hospital' and Port Charles become overwhelmed with vampires, because they don’t. But there is some real concern and some questions and confusion and mistaken identity and all those things make for good plotting. It’s really how does the story fit that story and all the baggage that comes back with people like Lynn Herring and me and Michael Easton and Kelly [Monaco]?"

— Jon Lindstrom (Kevin Collins) on the vampire story arc.

On New Year's Eve, a car carrying Connie and Johnny collides with a car carrying Michael, Kristina, Starr, and Trey, then hits Ellie Trout. Trey becomes braindead, and Kristina and Connie take him off life support. Ellie is temporarily thought to be paralyzed. That night Maxie miscarries Dante and Lulu's baby, and becomes pregnant again after sleeping with Damian Spinelli. She keeps it all a secret after Spinelli chooses to be with Ellie. Meanwhile, during February Sweeps, Lucy runs into John McBain and believes he is Caleb Morley, whom she calls king of the vampires. She is sent to Ferncliff after she stabs McBain and asserts that she is a vampire slayer. The storyline references the past spin-off Port Charles, where Michael Easton played Caleb and Kelly Monaco played Livvie Locke. Valentini asserted "we're not doing vampires" and that the story was homage to the actors and characters involved. Carlivati commented, "The story does get pretty over-the-top yet it's still rooted in a certain reality. Lucy may be off-kilter but she's certainly not in Heather Webber territory. Her belief in vampires will be very convincing." Another former Port Charles character, Alison Barrington, arrives with her now teenage son Rafe Kovich, Jr. McBain is arrested under suspicion of murdering Alison, while Caleb is revealed, seen to be a different person than McBain. A.J. Quartermaine (Sean Kanan) comes back to town after hearing that his brother Jason (Steve Burton) is presumed dead.

=== 2013 ===
The series marked its 50th anniversary on April 1, 2013. In preparation for the milestone several popular characters from earlier years returned to the show and storylines evoking past hallmarks of the series were introduced. Among these were the return of Laura Spencer in a storyline featuring her and Luke confronting Helena Cassadine and the revival of the Nurses Ball. Soon after ABC and Prospect Park who revived All My Children and One Life To Live is suing ABC for damaging OLTL's characters Starr Manning, Todd Manning and John Mcbain. In order to keep Kristen Alderson {Starr} Roger Howarth {Todd} and Michael Easton they were forced to bring them on as three completely different characters. {Alderson} is introduced as Morgan's (Bryan Craig) girlfriend Kiki Jerome. Howarth is brought in as Franco, previously held by James Franco. While Easton was introduced as doctor Silas Clay who is Stephen Clay's twin brother. New story lines kicked off to integrate the characters including the resurrection of the infamous Jerome crime family, Franco's brain tumor and Silas and Sam's new relationship.

In 2013, Morgan Corinthos (Bryan Craig) leaves boarding school after racking up gambling debts and goes to New York City to Kiki (Kristen Alderson), his girlfriend. Morgan's father (Sonny Corinthos) and mother (Carly Corinthos Jacks) go to New York City to find their son. They find their son in the apartment of Ava Jerome (Maura West) with his girlfriend. They convince him to come home. Ava soon arrives in town to see Morgan and Kiki who had already left New York City.

In July 2013, Derek Wells (Julian Jerome) portrayed by (William deVry) arrives in town. He takes over Kate Howard's magazine. It is revealed that he is working with his previously unmentioned sister, Ava Jerome, to take back the family's territory from Sonny Corinthos. In addition, Julian is scripted as being the biological father of Sam Morgan due to his one-time tryst with a teenage Alexis Davis. Though Julian starts off as a stand-up guy, he becomes very bitter, lethal and unpredictable as his family falls apart around him. He also takes over his father's organization but always has a soft spot for the women in his life, which is first displayed with Cheryl. This trend continues with Alexis and Sam despite Julian being unaware of his connection to them. But true to form, Julian is still very tough on his sisters, Ava and Olivia.

Patrick begins dating Dr. Britt Westbourne (Kelly Thiebaud), but breaks up with her when he realizes she has been treating Emma poorly. Emma encourages Patrick to date her babysitter, Sabrina Santiago (Teresa Castillo), which Patrick eventually does. In order to try to trap Dr. Patrick Drake in a relationship, Britt Westbourne planned to use a sample from the hospital sperm bank and pass the child off as Patrick's, although her mother, Dr. Liesl Obrecht, came up with the idea that they use Dante and Lulu's already fertilized embryos. Britt eventually came clean to Patrick that he was not her child's father, and named Brad instead. She gives birth to her son with the help of Sabrina Santiago and Nikolas Cassadine. Patrick and Sabrina are engaged, and are about to get married when Robin comes to the ceremony and reveals herself to be alive. Britt took him back to Wyndemere, after Nikolas insisted they stay with him when she had no place to go. Soon after, Britt's mother showed up and kidnapped Ben when Britt made it clear that her mother was forbidden from seeing him. Dr. Obrecht took Ben to Cassadine Island in Greece, and left him with Robin Scorpio-Drake, Patrick's presumed-dead wife who was actually being held captive by Sonny's long time enemy Jerry Jacks because that was after Franco was revealed to be alive. Robin protects and takes care of Ben, thinking he's Patrick's son. Nikolas and Britt travel to Cassadine Island to rescue Ben. While there, Britt reveals to Faison that Ben is not her biological son and has no relation to either one of them.

=== 2014 ===
Britt later tells Nikolas that she conceived Ben via a sperm donor, but soon learns that her lies are beginning to unravel when Dante and Lulu discover that their remaining embryos are missing from the hospital lab. Elizabeth Webber later finds out that Ben and Dante have the same food allergy, and secretly runs a DNA test. She confronts Britt, who claims her mother stole an anonymous sperm to impregnate her, and she had no idea it was Dante. Britt lets Dante have shared custody of Ben, hoping to make up for taking Ben away from Lulu. However, Elizabeth finds a note Britt wrote to Lulu telling the truth about Ben, and shows it to Lulu. Britt is cornered, and has to admit the truth. Obrecht kidnaps Ben when she realizes the truth is out, and tries to help Britt get out of town with Ben. However, Britt tells Dante and Lulu where her mother is, and Ben is rescued. After Lulu and Dante take him home, they decide to rename him as their own son, giving him the name Rocco Falconeri.

Nina Clay is first mentioned as the comatose wife of Silas' in early 2014. He's under the suspicion of attempting to murder her with a drug overdose. Nina's brother Nathan investigates the case and finds out that it was in fact Nina's mother Madeline Reeves. Madeline confirms that Nina was pregnant with Silas' child. She wanted to get rid of Nina's baby and accidentally overdosed her own daughter. Madeline tells Nathan that Nina has died, but later tells him that she only had Nina declared dead to get the inheritance that was left to Nina by Madeline's late husband.

In March 2014, Jordan Ashford arrives in Port Charles upon learning that her son T.J. Ashford (Tequan Richmond) had found himself caught in a mob war between Sonny Corinthos (Maurice Benard) and Julian Jerome (William deVry). While T.J. and his guardian, Shawn Butler (Sean Blakemore), assured Jordan that T.J. was safe from Julian, Jordan still pressured her son to leave Port Charles with her. When T.J. refused, Jordan decided to remain in Port Charles with her son and took a job working for the Jerome Organization at an art gallery they owned. Shawn warned Jordan to stay away from the Jerome's and when she refused, he threatened to tell T.J. that the reason he had been sent to Port Charles in the first place was because she was serving a two-year prison sentence for dealing drugs. While Jordan attempted to convince Shawn that she had changed, she secretly offered to distribute drugs for Julian that he was running through town. Jordan is eventually arrested as part of a sting operation organized by the Port Charles Police Department, at which time she reveals she is working undercover with the DEA to bring down the Jerome Organization. The series marks its 51st anniversary on April 1, 2014.

The 2014 Nurses' Ball is planned for May. It is learned that Julian's backer is a Luke look-a-like. Levi Dunkleman first appears out of the shower at Nathan West (Ryan Paevey)'s apartment as Maxie Jones' (Kirsten Storms) boyfriend because Maxie was gone finding herself and found Levi in Australia in Oceania and decided to come home to Port Charles and tells Nathan to confront Madeline Reeves (Donna Mills) one more time for putting Nina Clay in a coma and killing her unborn grandchild. After that, Levi and Maxie are romancing each other because Levi is an environmentalist, not a private investigator like Damian Spinelli (Bradford Anderson). After Nathan was gone, Madeline's younger sister Liesl Obrecht (Kathleen Gati) says that Nathan is her son. After Britt Westbourne (Kelly Thiebaud) lost her son, she taken into Maxie's apartment and later knows that Nathan and Britt are siblings. He attends the Nurses' Ball with Maxie because Nathan West was going to do the "Magic Milo" performance.

Gabriel Drake Santiago, the son of Patrick Drake and Sabrina Santiago, is born prematurely April 25, 2014 after his parents and older sister, Emma is in a car accident. He was rushed to the hospital and treated by Dr. Britt Westbourne in the neonatal intensive-care unit. He is put on a ventilator to help him breathe. He suffers a minor set back and is unable to get enough air into his lungs, but the doctors are able to stabilize him. Patrick and Sabrina sat vigil by his bedside as the doctors cared for him. As his condition seemed to be improving, his parents along with sister Emma, decides to name him Gabriel Drake Santiago, after his maternal grandmother, father, and half-sister. Gabriel's condition took a turn for the worse when he was diagnosed with necrotizing enterocolitis. This condition caused the infection he was fighting to spread, which resulted in massive organ failure. His parents had him baptized in the hospital and soon after he died surrounded by his parents.

In May 2014, after nearly twenty years in a comatose state, Nina awakens and is transferred to a different facility to undergo rehabilitation and treatment. Roughly a month later, Nina arrives in Port Charles and shocks a bewildered Silas with her presence when she arrives at a birthday party for Danny, the son of Silas's new girlfriend, Samantha Morgan. Nina soon has to find out that much has changed in those twenty years she's been in a coma. She is introduced to Silas' daughter with his former mistress Ava Jerome, Kiki. After first not being aware that Silas and Sam are a couple, Nina claims to be fine with it; accepting the end of her marriage; and tells Silas that it would only be natural for his life to go on. However it is later revealed that Nina has been awake for longer than she says and that she trashed Silas' apartment a few months back. Nina in fact wants revenge on everyone that wronged her.

In June 2014, T.J. finds Rafe snorting cocaine in the park. T.J. taunts Rafe about his serial killer dad. Rafe snarks about T.J.'s mom and Molly's dad being drug dealers and then punches T.J. On July 2, Sam, Silas and Patrick Drake realize that Rafe was the driver who ran Patrick off the road, ultimately leading to the death of his infant son. Running from the cops, Rafe discovers that Nina is faking her paralysis and that she is out to destroy Sam and Silas, but Nina gives Rafe money to leave town. As he is leaving, Molly gets in the car to stop him, but he drives off with her. While being chased by Sam and Dante, Rafe tells Molly that someone told him to run Patrick off the road. Then the car crashes into the road block, and Rafe and Molly are rushed to the hospital. Rafe apologizes to Patrick for killing his son, but suffers a seizure before he can tell Patrick everything. Patrick reluctantly operates on Rafe, but a blood vessel in Rafe's brain bursts, leaving him brain dead. On July 16, Silas turns off the life support machines and Rafe dies surrounded by family and friends.

=== 2018 ===
Laura's husband Kevin is attacked when visiting his serial killer twin brother in a mental hospital. Ryan takes Kevin's place and kills Ava Jerome's daughter Kiki.

=== 2019 ===
Battling a brain tumor, Oscar Nero Quartermaine dies when he stops all treatment.
