= Sabrina Santiago =

Fictional character from General Hospital

- General Hospital character
- Portrayed by: Teresa Castillo
- Duration: 2012–2016
- First appearance: September 19, 2012
- Last appearance: September 16, 2016
- Created by: Ron Carlivati
- Introduced by: Frank Valentini
In-universe information
- Other names: Sabrina Maria Dominica Santiago
- Occupation: Nurse; Nanny (2015)
- Family: Santiago
- Mother: Gabriella Santiago
- Spouse: Carlos Rivera (2016)
- Sons: Gabriel Santiago; Teddy Rivera
- Uncles: Armando Santiago
- Aunts: Inocencia Santos
- First cousins: Juan Santiago (adoptive)

Sabrina Santiago is a fictional character from the original ABC daytime soap opera General Hospital, played by Teresa Castillo.

Created by head writer Ron Carlivati, and introduced under executive producer Frank Valentini, Sabrina is introduced as a nerdy, pushover student nurse at General Hospital who has a crush on the widowed former playboy Dr. Patrick Drake. Patrick's other love interest, Dr. Britt Westbourne, takes pleasure in torturing Sabrina about the fact that Patrick will never notice her. Sabrina is very close with Patrick's daughter Emma, who also clashes with Britt. Sabrina is also known for her friendship with Felix DuBois. The character serves as a catalyst to re-introduce the annual tradition of the Nurses' Ball in honor of Patrick's late wife, Robin Scorpio.

Patrick and Sabrina's romance is plagued by interference from Britt, who tries to pass her unborn child off as his. Later, the series introduces Sabrina's ex-boyfriend, Carlos Rivera, who battles Patrick for her affections. Patrick eventually proposes to Sabrina, while many including Carlos warn both of them that Robin is alive. With no proof, the couple goes through with the wedding only for Robin to appear as they are pronounced husband and wife. Sabrina was murdered in September 2016 by Paul Hornsby, who is acting as the hospital's mass-killer.

== Creation ==
=== Background ===
Sabrina Maria Dominica Santiago was born to Gabriella Santiago and her husband in Puerto Rico around 1986. Sabrina is the adoptive cousin of former character Juan Santiago (Michael Saucedo). Juan suggests that Sabrina go to General Hospital to finish her nursing degree. Sabrina's adoptive mother was also a nurse and according to Sabrina was pretty good at her job. However, Sabrina's adoptive mother died when she was very young. Sabrina grows up idolizes her adoptive mother. After her adoptive mother's death, Sabrina's adoptive father sends her to live with her adoptive cousins in Puerto Rico as he is unable to raise her on his own. Sabrina carries her adoptive mother's stethoscope. In high school Sabrina dates Carlos Rivera (Jeffrey Vincent Parise) and she loses her virginity to him. Immediately after college, Carlos wants to marry and start a family, while Sabrina wants to focus on her career. Right around the same time, Juan suggests Sabrina finish her nursing degree in Port Charles. As of June 2013, Sabrina was 27 years old.

=== Casting and characterization ===
Castillo originally auditioned for the role of Delores Padilla when GH's casting director, Mark Teschner noticed her on Franklin & Bash. She actually did a chemistry test with her current co-star, Jason Thompson, who portrayed Patrick. However, the series decided to stick with Rebecca Montoya as Delores.

"I had them give me a half up party pony. I had them draw a unibrow on me, and they had this tray of glasses so I got the biggest set, and I was hunched over! Then, I am in the elevator, and what you are supposed to do is that when the elevator opens, you are supposed to step out and trip. And there he is … Patrick… and you start talking to yourself and he is right behind you. I had looked at myself in the mirror going, this girl is so ridiculous right now, and I thought naturally, she should have a lisp. So they are counting it down and I think to myself, “OK, I am going to take a risk here. And they are either going to love it or kick me out for not taking this seriously.” So I just did it with a lisp. And nobody stopped me! And the scene was with Jason, and I could see it in his eyes that he wanted to burst into laughter. At the end when they cut, I just heard Frank’s voice over the loud speaker going, “That was awesome, Teresa.” I was so pleased with what I had done."

— Castillo on her creative audition.

In the spring of 2012, she was contacted again by the series and she auditioned for the role of "Maya." Castillo admitted that she didn't think they even came up with her character's real name until the day before she was to start taping her first scenes. She once again tested with Thompson. Castillo was chosen out of hundreds of other actresses for the role of Sabrina. After several weeks of waiting, she was contacted by the show again and read for executive producer, Frank Valentini. She went back for another chemistry test in late August. Castillo began filming her scenes on August 31, 2012. During the audition, the actresses started out getting "pretty" to do a fantasy scene in which the character admits her love for Patrick, and then transforming into a nerdy girl with glasses for the rest of the scene. To make sure she stood out from the 9 other actresses that the producers had called back, Castillo admitted that she "decided to have fun." Several days later, Castillo learned from her manager that she had booked the role. The character first appeared on September 19, despite some sources stating the first air date to be September 14. The date may have been confused with Emily Wilson's first appearance as Ellie Trout, who did appear on the 14th. Castillo originated the role on a contractual basis.

Though the character does not have a lisp, or the uni-brow, the huge glasses and the not so neat hair remain. Sabrina comes off very afraid at times, and usually cannot be honest about how she feels. Apart from her feelings for Patrick, Sabrina's whole life is defined by following in her mother's footsteps and becoming a nurse. Like her mother, "[Sabrina] wants to make a difference in the world. She truly cares about people." Castillo described the character as "considering, kind and loving." She has a mind of her own.

In September 2016, it was revealed that Castillo would be departing the soap. Castillo last appeared on September 16, 2016.

== Development ==
=== Introduction and love triangle ===
When Kimberly McCullough, who played Robin departed from the series in February 2012 and the character was presumed dead, the producers were faced with the difficult task of having Patrick (Jason Thompson) move forward without the love of his life. Despite prior reports that Sabrina would not be involved with Patrick, it was confirmed that she would be introduced as a student nurse with Patrick as her crush. According to Castillo, the writers were very "merciful" in the introduction her character, instead of having Sabrina throw herself at Patrick very strongly, which would most likely lead to a lot fan backlash because of Thompson's popular pairing with McCullough's Robin, Sabrina is terrified at the sight of Patrick. In addition to her crush on Patrick, Sabrina helps revive the once annual series tradition of the Nurses' Ball, a benefit for AIDS research; Robin is HIV-positive. Early on, the triangle focuses on Patrick's romance with Britt Westbourne (Kelly Thiebaud) as Sabrina pines for his affections.

=== Transformation ===
Teresa Castillo as Sabrina, before her makeover (left), with Sabrina's signature thick glasses, and messy hair, and after her makeover (right), with neat straight hair, and contacts.

Head writer Ron Carlivati said that Sabrina's confession, regardless of Patrick's reaction, in addition to Sabrina graduating from nursing school is an effort to show the character's growth. According to Castillo, Sabrina constantly avoids Patrick's attempts to confess by changing the subject. On the day of the ball, Sabrina lets Felix give her a makeover as a way of showing Patrick what he is missing out on. Castillo said Sabrina's makeover for the annual Nurse's Ball was interesting because in Sabrina's eyes, the glasses and not so tidy hair stood between her and Patrick. Even some of her own cast mates don't recognize her. With Sabrina's makeover, comes a new sense of self-confidence. Though the character's physical transformation played a huge part, it is more Sabrina's internal transformation that forces Patrick to reconsider his feelings for her. Carlivati said Sabrina "ultimately emerged as the swan at the Nurses Ball."

=== Relationship with Patrick ===
Of the pairing, Carlivati said he wanted the love story to unfold slowly, starting with Sabrina being the best for Emma, while having Patrick overlook the fact that he has found the perfect woman to make a new life with. According to Castillo, though Sabrina's affections started out as a crush, they developed a friendship, and she gained a lot of respect for Patrick as she got to know him. For Sabrina, it grew into a "very deep love."

Like many other characters in soap history, Sabrina was faced with the situation of having her happiness ruined by her lover's presumed-dead spouse. Soap Opera Digest characterized the conflict between Robin and Sabrina as a "Cold War!" According to McCullough, Robin is aware of how Patrick and Sabrina love each other, and Castillo explained that it is extremely difficult because Sabrina has always had good intentions; she has never put her needs before the happiness of Patrick and Emma. If Sabrina needs to be the martyr, then she will take on that role. However, her relationships with both Patrick and Emma especially are very strong. McCullough said what makes the situation even more interesting is that everyone, from Robin to Patrick to Sabrina, is trying to be "noble." Robin and Sabrina avoid any underhanded tactics or manipulations, which makes both women look extremely good. Of the dynamic between Sabrina and Robin, Castillo said "They have a lot in common," and if the situation was different, they could actually be friends. Carlivati felt that having Patrick just ditch Sabrina and act like his feelings for her were instantly gone would have been extremely unrealistic. According to Carlivati, Felix is not the kind of person who will let Sabrina wallow in her potential defeat; he always encourages and supports her. Castillo told Soap Opera Digest that Sabrina saw it coming. "She knew at the wedding," Castillo insisted. Sabrina immediately knew that Patrick belongs with Robin, and was, according to the actress, actually shocked that he is torn about the decision. However, there is a brief moment when Patrick comes to Sabrina that she thinks he may choose her. For Sabrina, Patrick's choice is "the end of it." Sabrina has to find a way to move on with her life.

=== Carlos and pregnancy ===
However, by the time Patrick makes his decision and chooses Robin, Felix is not around to support her, but Carlos is. Both Carlos and Sabrina are in turmoil when he shows up on her doorstep with a gunshot wound. The last person Sabrina wants comfort from is Carlos, she wants Felix and is extremely relieved when he comes home. However, they have the issue of Carlos to deal with. In a way, Carlos fills a specific void in Sabrina's life, because he always takes care of her. In the past, "Carlos was there to offer her love, guidance and protection," and he does so again after Sabrina is left to deal with Patrick's choice. Carlos loved Sabrina long before the makeover, and appreciated her "demure" personality believing she would make the perfect wife and mother. Castillo hints at the possibility of Sabrina reverting to her former self after being hurt, but said Sabrina has changed a lot while Carlos is still very much the same kind of man. He has a set image in his mind for what a wife and mother should be, and Sabrina's desire for something different is what led to their initial split. Castillo said, Carlos and Sabrina also shared a very deep love, so he would always have a spot in her heart. However, Castillo maintained that "it's not enough for her to go back to him." However, Sabrina faces much bigger issue when she gets sick, and Felix suggest that she could be pregnant. Castillo revealed that pregnancy is the last thing on Sabrina's mind, she can't ignore it once a pregnancy test confirms it. Sabrina's on-screen pregnancy coincided with the real-life pregnancy of Teresa Castillo, which the actress confirms to Soaps In Depth. Sabrina refuses to use her pregnancy to fight for Patrick, because of Emma. And once Patrick makes his choice, Sabrina doesn't see him as an option.

== Storylines ==
Sabrina immediately develops a crush on Patrick Drake (Jason Thompson), who has recently started dating Britt Westbourne (Kelly Thiebaud). Sabrina often babysits Patrick's daughter, Emma (Brooklyn Rae Silzer), during their dates and the two develop a friendship. When Emma tells her about the ball, Sabrina decides to revive the ball in honor of Robin Scorpio (Kimberly McCullough), Patrick's late wife and Emma's mother. Sabrina, along with Elizabeth Webber (Rebecca Herbst) and best friend, Felix DuBois (Marc Anthony Samuel) lead the committee to help relaunch the ball. Sabrina and Felix track down Lucy Coe (Lynn Herring) to resume her usual job of running the ball.

In the meantime, Patrick and Sabrina become very close friends, while Emma develops a disdain for Britt. Meanwhile, Patrick and Sabrina continue to bond, and nearly share a kiss on New Year's Eve. Britt manipulates the situation and lies to Sabrina about how uncomfortable Patrick is around her which leads to Sabrina quitting as Emma's babysitter. Things come to a head when a confrontation between Emma and Britt leads to Emma running away and Sabrina finds her. After Patrick dumps her, Britt seeks revenge on Sabrina and leads her to believe she accidentally killed a patient by administering the wrong medication, and Sabrina nearly gets kicked out of the nursing program. Later, Sabrina is accused of cheating on her nursing exam when a copy of the exam is found in her locker. Fortunately, Sabrina convinces head nurse Epiphany Johnson (Sonya Eddy) to let her take the test again, and she passes. Sabrina then admits her feelings for Patrick, not knowing if he will reciprocate, though she doesn't think it is possible. However, when it is revealed that Patrick paid for the investigation into the alleged cheating scandal that nearly cost her a spot in the nursing program, Felix insists that Patrick cares for her.

Sabrina is no longer willing to wait around for Patrick. She instead accepts a date with Milo Giambetti (Drew Cheetwood). Sabrina initially hesitates, knowing Felix has a crush on Milo. However, she realizes that she needs to start looking elsewhere, and unlike Patrick, Milo shows an immediate interest in her. At the same time, Patrick is trying to find the appropriate time to tell Sabrina he has feelings for her. Patrick and Sabrina finally admit their feelings for one another. The relationship is immediately tested when Britt announces she is pregnant. After the ball, Sabrina and Felix team up to disprove the paternity of Britt's baby. Felix and Sabrina manage to get a DNA test, only for Britt to tamper with the results to make sure the child is proven to be Patrick's. However, Britt admits that Patrick isn't her baby's father, and Sabrina and Patrick try to work on their relationship.

Sabrina is shocked when her ex-boyfriend, Carlos Rivera (Jeffrey Parise), comes to Port Charles to win her back. She tells Patrick, who is slightly jealous of Carlos' declaration. Though she assures him Carlos is not a threat, Patrick believes differently when he witnesses an intimate moment between Sabrina and a shirtless Carlos. Though Carlos says all the right words to Sabrina, she is in love with Patrick. Eventually, Patrick proposes to Sabrina, and she accepts. But on their wedding day, Robin shows up alive, and reunites with her husband and daughter. Sabrina is heartbroken, though Patrick is torn on what to do. Sabrina, though, tells him he has to make a decision. Robin tries to get Sabrina to break up with Patrick to make his choice easier, but Sabrina chooses not to, saying Patrick should make the decision.

Eventually, Patrick tells Sabrina he's going back to his wife. Though Sabrina is devastated, she accepts his decision. However, soon after, Sabrina finds out she's pregnant with Patrick's child. She doesn't want to tell Patrick for fear of looking like Britt, but Felix blurts it out to Patrick. Carlos finds out and offers to raise the baby with Sabrina. When Patrick shows up to ask Sabrina if she's pregnant, Carlos claims that Sabrina is carrying his child, not Patrick's. Sabrina goes along with this and lies so Patrick will go back to Robin. However, when Sabrina misleads Emma with her baby's paternity, she feels guilty and admits to Patrick that she lied and he is the father of her baby. Robin leaves town soon after, and Sabrina is there for Emma when she needs a mother figure. In April 2014, Sabrina, Patrick, and Emma get into a hit-and-run car accident sending Sabrina into premature labor. She gives birth on the side of the road with Britt's help, and her son spends several weeks in the hospital fighting to survive. Patrick and Sabrina name him Gabriel after her mother and have him baptized before he passes away due to an underdeveloped respiratory system. Sabrina suffers a breakdown, and Patrick is forced to remind her that their son is dead. Sabrina leaves town with Juan shortly after the funeral.

Sabrina returns to Port Charles in August 2014 and learns that Rafe Kovich, Jr. (Jimmy Deshler) is responsible for her accident. Sabrina is led to believe that Ava Jerome (Maura West) put Rafe up to running her off the road to keep Carlos under her thumb, and she vows revenge. Sabrina intentionally prescribes Ava medication to induce labor. However, feeling guilty and questioning her decision, she confesses her schemes and loses her job at the hospital. In January 2015, Sabrina takes a job working for Michael Quartermaine (Chad Duell) at his new clinic. But when the clinic plans are put on hold, Michael offers to hire Sabrina as the nanny for his little sister, Avery. In the summer of 2015, Sabrina and Michael begin a romantic relationship and in September 2015, Sabrina learns she is pregnant with Michael's child. Their relationship ended when Michael learned that Carlos was the baby's father. In September 2016, Sabrina was killed by Paul Hornsby when she figured out he was the Hospital Killer after he attacked Monica.

== Reception ==
"One day soon — before Robin, as rumored, returns from the dead at the Nurse’s Ball — Sabrina will straighten her hair and take off her glasses and emerge as beautiful young lady, Cinderella-style. We’ve all been waiting for that! But I think Sabrina has been beautiful all along — at least in Port Charles, where young girls in the last decade and a half or so have been nothing but fodder for victimization or violence. Thank goodness for a lead character like Sabrina. Such routine misogyny is now very much in the past.

— Connie Hayman on the beauty of Sabrina, before the makover.

Backlash to the character's introduction was very evident on social media with fans attacking Castillo personally. Sara Bibel and Luke Kerr described the character as "saccharin." Michael Logan of TV Guide described Sabrina as "Ugly Betty—esque." According to Michael Fairman, Sabrina, immediately draws comparisons to the character for her appearance and her "heart of gold." Bibel admitted that she would never like a "do-gooder" like Sabrina and compared the character to Mary Sue. Bibel also said the character's dialogue was extremely similar to that of the teenaged Molly Lansing (Haley Pullos) which made her look too immature for Patrick. Bibel also described the character as "insipid." Castillo told Soap Opera Digest that early on, she experienced a lot of "straight-up hate," but was relieved that more fans gradually grew to like Sabrina. Castillo cited the Nurses' Ball episodes as the reason for fans changing their opinions. Maria Ciaccia described the character upon her introduction as "plain-looking." Marlena De Lacroix aka Connie Passalacqua [Hayman] immediately loved the character of Sabrina. According to Passalacqua, Sabrina has an "instant charm." Passalacqua described the character as "smart independent and not in the least easily destructible like so many young heroines Bob Guza used to write." Passalacqua praised the writers for finally allowing Sabrina to stand on her own when she stood up to Epiphany about the cheating accusations. The character was listed on Latina magazine's website as one of the favorite Latinos on the series.

Some fans thought Sabrina's story and the relationship with Patrick should have been reserved for Elizabeth Webber, Robin and Patrick's close friend. Sara Bibel was against the pairing and recommended the spunky Ellie Trout (Emily Wilson) would be a better love interest for Patrick, the brain surgeon. Michael Fairman said it was intriguing "how [Sabrina] was carefully placed into the Drake family's sphere." Hayman also praised the romantic triangle and described Sabrina's relationship with Emma as "heart-tugging." Despite the character's very soft exterior, fans did not take kindly to Sabrina as Patrick's potential love interest. Castillo admitted that she was not prepared for the fans to be so vocal, but said that she respected their loyalty to Robin and Patrick. However McCullough took the time to encourage Castillo about her role and noted the character's growth since her introduction. Regan Cellura of Daytime Confidential praised the triangle between Sabrina, Patrick and Britt, and Sabrina's friendship with Felix and Elizabeth. Jamey Giddens said that he didn't see a point at the beginning of the triangle, but the story eventually hooked him. Of Castillo, Giddens said, "it's easy to root for her in this mini-telenovela-meets-rom-com arc on GH." Despite the huge fan base for Patrick and Robin, Castillo and the pairing of Patrick and Sabrina garnered a fan following, with the pairing being listed consistently in the top ten pairings in ABC Soaps In Depth, and Castillo being listed as one of fan favorite actresses on the series. On a poll on Daytime Confidential asking fans if Sabrina should just walk away from Patrick when Robin returned, 82% (3065 votes) agreed she should walk away. Sports analyst, Stephen A. Smith even weighed in on Patrick's dilemma on The Arsenio Hall Show with Robin as the obvious choice, despite Sabrina's good qualities. Patrick and Sabrina's wedding gave the series its largest viewership and best ratings season in seven years with 3.3. million people tuning in for the nuptials, which were interrupted by Robin. The pairing ranked at #22 on We Love Soaps list of the "25 Most Popular Couples of the Year."

"Student nurse Sabrina Santiago [barreled] into Port Charles General Hospital, a mess of hair, thick-rimmed glasses and nervous energy. However, at the recent Nurses Ball, this quirky duckling transformed into quite the magnificent swan, securing Dr. Patrick Drake's (Jason Thompson) heart in the process!"

— Regan Cellura on Sabrina's transformation.

In response to character's makeover during the Nurses' Ball, Bibel said she could do without the "Pretty Pink Princess" routine. Writing her like a Disney princess made the character seem too immature, according to Bibel. Bibel's dislike for Sabrina also made her root for Britt, during the pregnancy reveal. Ciaccia believed the character was an homage to Audrey Hepburn's Sabrina [Fairchild]. Ciaccia also noted the character's similarities to Lynn Herring's early portrayal of Lucy Coe as a "plain Jane librarian," who also gets a makeover. Castillo on the other hand was more excited about fans coming to accept Sabrina as a part of Patrick's life, then she was about the makeover.

Ron Carlivati praised Castillo for taking the risk by accepting the role as the "other woman" in Patrick's life and said she handled the task with "dignity and class." Passalacqua applauded casting director Mark Teschner for finding Castillo, and the writers for coming up with the "refreshing new character." Connie Passalacqua said Castillo brought an "innocence and youthful idealism" to the character making her a "breath of fresh air." Passalacqua's husband, Edward Hayman also praised Castillo for her "sweet" yet vulnerable portrayal of the character. Michael Fairman said Castillo gave a "solid" performance in her portrayal of a devastated bride. Fairman also praised Castillo for her performance in the episode in which Patrick breaks things off with Sabrina to return to Robin. Marlena De Lacroix also praised Castillo for her portrayal of Sabrina and described her performance as "masterful" in showing Sabrina "great pain at seeing all her dreams come unraveled."
