= Lucy Coe =

Fictional character from General Hospital

- General Hospital character
- Portrayed by: Lynn Herring
- Duration: 1986–2004; 2012–present
- First appearance: April 11, 1986
- Created by: Pat Falken Smith and Norma Monty
- Introduced by: Gloria Monty; Wendy Riche (1997); Jill Farren Phelps (2004); Frank Valentini (2012)
- Book appearances: Robin's Diary
- Spin-off appearances: Port Charles
In-universe information
- Other names: Lucille Coe; Constance Chapman
- Occupation: Businesswoman; Tour guide; Vampire slayer; Housewife; Librarian; Realtor; Author
- Spouse: Tony Jones (1987–89); Alan Quartermaine (1990–91); Rex Stanton (1998); Scott Baldwin (2000–01); Kevin Collins (2001–03, 2004–14)
- Adoptive daughters: Serena Baldwin; Christina Baldwin
- Aunts: Charlene Simpson
- First cousins: Colton Shore; Decker Moss; Rafe Kovich

Lucy Coe is a fictional character from the ABC Daytime soap operas General Hospital and Port Charles. Portrayed by Lynn Herring, she first appeared in April 1986 on General Hospital, introduced as an alibi in a murder plot. In 1997, she made her second departure from the show and joined its now defunct spin-off Port Charles. There, she was involved in storylines revolving around vampires, where it was revealed that Lucy was a vampire slayer. The character stayed on Port Charles until October 2003, when the series was cancelled, and she made a brief guest appearance on General Hospital in July 2004. In November 2012, after more than eight years off-screen, it was confirmed that Herring was to return to General Hospital. She returned that December for the revival of the infamous Nurses' Ball, which she founded in the 1990s, as well as a continuation of Port Charles' vampire story arc.

Over the years, Lucy is known for having developed from a "mousy librarian" to a villainous liar, schemer and vixen to ultimately an unlikely heroine. She has been noted by critics for her manipulative yet eccentric personality. Herring's portrayal has received critical acclaim, for which she garnered two Daytime Emmy Award nominations and numerous wins and nominations for the Soap Opera Digest Awards.

== Casting ==
Lynn Herring, a former beauty queen who placed fourth in the 1977 Miss USA pageant, originated the role of Lucy Coe in 1986. She was introduced as a "pivotal witness" in the Brownstone Murder Mystery storyline arc. The character was to be quickly written out, but executive producer Gloria Monty kept Herring on due to popular demand. This caused Herring to dramatically alter her career path. She was studying for her master's degree to become a psychiatrist at Loyola College. However, once she signed a contract for General Hospital, she quit her studies. Herring said, "Acting comes first. I thought I wanted to do counselling. But Lucy turns out to be more fun". She remained a regular cast member until 1991. She briefly departed General Hospital to pursue the role of Lisanne Gardner on Days of Our Lives, before returning in November 1992.

== Development ==
=== Characterization and portrayal ===
Upon her debut on the series, Lucy Coe was described as the show's latest "bad girl". She was penned by The Vancouver Sun as being either a "drab social worker, admitted liar" and "sexy schemer" or a "clever youngster" who was cutting corners for money. Initially, Lucy was a guest character who was a "mousy librarian" that quickly lies for a friend, Kevin O'Connor, on the stand, and is caught. Lucy was planned to be written off. General Hospital fans, however, were intrigued by the character, prompting the show's executive producer Gloria Monty to keep Herring as part of the cast. The actress said, "No one knows what to make of Lucy. She's smart and shift, very good at manipulating people. I want to know more about her". Lilana Novakovich of the Toronto Star characterized Lucy as a "sexy villain", who fans loved to hate. Lucy is always at odds against "just about everyone else in town."

Herring admittedly enjoys playing "sleazebag" and "seductress" Lucy. Considered one of "daytime's most manipulative witches", Herring has stated that she is very different from her character. "The hardest thing I have to deal with in public is that a lot of times, people want me to be Lucy with them, even if it means being cruel", she said. The actress told Calhoun Times that she was "basically not that way" at all, having been raised to be mannered and polite; "I get the feeling that everyone's very disappointed that I'm not trying to get something from them". However, Herring also said, "I wouldn't trade places with anybody. All her badness is a magnification of qualities we all have—greed and selfishness."

Lucy celebrates her birthday on May 22.

=== Port Charles ===
In 1997, Herring left the series to permanently migrate the character of Lucy to ABC Daytime's new soap opera Port Charles, which was a spin-off to General Hospital. Herring was assisted by two other characters, Kevin Collins and Scott Baldwin, in their move to the new soap. Initially, Herring was doubtful about starring in a new spin-off. She said: "I was a part of the decision. I got a phone call from a friend who said, 'I think they’re going to spin General Hospital off,' and I thought it was a prank, like an April Fool’s. Because I thought it really wasn’t possible to separate core characters out of a show. And then Wendy Riche who was the producer at the time called pretty quickly after that, and said, 'We have this great idea, and it’s your character, we’re bringing Kin back, and we’ll have GH people flopping back and forth. And Doc [Kevin] will be there and we’ll create this whole other world.'" Herring explained, "part of me was so fearful because I know how hard it is to be successful in daytime, and also I fought hard to stay viable all those years before we did that. So it was really scary". She remained on Port Charles, which experienced low ratings, until its 2003 cancellation.

Port Charles explored "very dark" plots, which revolved around vampires, an unusual storyline for daytime television. A seductive evil vampire named Caleb Morley (Michael Easton) sires Livvie Locke (Kelly Monaco). Lucy, Port Charles' "resident eccentric", was then revealed to be a vampire slayer, making her a pivotal character in the storyline. Nancy Reichardt of Star-News described making Lucy a central in this "genius". Reichardt wrote, "Midst all this high-camp drama, comes Herring's characterization, always filled with humor and heightened drama. This character would make a hangnail into a crisis, so she is in her element in this atmosphere.

=== Return to General Hospital ===
After Port Charles ended, Herring was not offered a place back on General Hospital. The actress stated, "That was very disheartening. It never occurred to me that Lucy wouldn't still have a place in town if PC didn't work out. But you know what? Even knowing what I know now, I would still go off to do PC. I would not trade that fabulous experience for anything!"

On July 16, 2004, Herring returned as a guest star on General Hospital, for Lucy to attend Lila Quartermaine's funeral. On July 24, 2009, it was reported that Herring would return to daytime television after years of absence, but on As the World Turns, not General Hospital. This raised eyebrows with fans of the show. Herring said, "This lady on the subway grabbed my arm and said, 'Why did you leave "GH"? They blame you for not being there. I said, 'I would have loved to go back to "GH," but they didn't ask me.'" Of her decision to join ABC Daytime's rival series, Herring stated, "Truthfully if GH had asked first, I would have been there in a heartbeat, and I let them know that too. I think with the mafia and their different stories, the older characters that I interacted with aren’t there anymore, with Jon going away, Kin not being there, Tony [Geary], and Jane [Elliot]. Jane and I talk all the time too, and she’s one, Tracy and Lucy passed a little bit, and they would be hilarious together, Jane would sometimes call and say you should really think about coming back. If they would have asked, I would have been there. So it’s not my fault." The actress expressed interest in returning to General Hospital.

The script writers and the outline writers and Ron, obviously, all got it, which is a gift in itself – not just to get to go back, but to have some funny oneliners and the reactions of the other characters to Lucy!

— Herring on the writing for Lucy's return, 2012

On November 2, 2012, after more than eight years off-screen, it was announced that Herring would return to General Hospital as Lucy that December. Lucy was to return to be involved in The Nurses Ball, a fictional event that was held every year in Port Charles, which she was the organizer of. Lucy returns at the request of Sabrina Santiago (Teresa Castillo), a young nursing student who plans to bring The Nurses Ball back. Her return was scheduled to air on December 14, however due to news coverage of the Sandy Hook Elementary School shooting, her return was postponed until December 17. Herring was one of several GH fan favorites to be brought back to the show, since Frank Valentini became executive producer in 2012. It was later announced that Lucy's ex-husband, Kevin Collins (Jon Lindstrom) would also be returning to General Hospital, as part of an ongoing storyline.

In January 2013, the vampire storylines from Port Charles were continued on General Hospital, after nearly a decade. Michael Easton (Caleb) plays John McBain on General Hospital, while Kelly Monaco (Livvie) plays Sam McCall; roles they began portraying after Port Charles concluded in 2003. At Kelly's Diner, Lucy sees John and Sam, and assumes that they are Caleb and Livvie. According to TV Guide, "Lucy goes into full slayer mode and stabs John." The show's head writer Ron Carlivati said, "This will kick off a nice little mystery story: Is Lucy crazy or is there something very real going on here? And, if she's crazy, why do John and Sam feel like they've met before?". Carlivati later confirmed that while the subject of vampires were being explored, "it's still rooted in a certain reality".

== Storylines ==
Lucy Coe first appeared in Port Charles in April 1986 as a mousy librarian, whose involvement with Kevin O'Connor made her an alibi in his murder case. After O'Connor duped her, Lucy retaliated by writing a tell-all book, by which she hoped to make some money. She proceeded to morph from a plain Jane to a sexy femme fatale. With the mousy Lucy now gone, she proceeded to have an affair with Bobbie Spencer's then-husband, Jake Meyer, with whom she miscarried a child. In the wake of her affair, Lucy was set up by her aunt Charlene with Tony Jones, which resulted in a wedding. After her marriage to Tony fell apart, Victor Jerome the mobster becomes infatuated with her and swallows a diamond pendant that he bought her, which causes him to die. Alan and Lucy cover it up. Later, Lucy ended up marrying Alan Quartermaine in a memorable ceremony, where she wore a red wedding dress. During her marriage to Alan, Lucy had an affair with Scott Baldwin, become pregnant with and miscarrying yet another child. Lucy ended up leaving town for a short while, with Greg Bennett in tow. When Lucy returned to Port Charles, Scott had moved on with Dominique Taub, who had been diagnosed with a terminal form of cancer. While Scott was reluctant to trust her, Dominique saw a kinder, gentler Lucy, and convinced Scott to allow her to be the surrogate mother to their child. After Dominique died, Lucy gave birth to their daughter, Serena, in a cabin during a blizzard. After being pressured by the mob, Scott was forced to flee Port Charles with Serena. Lucy returned to her scheming ways, albeit temporarily, and made a bet with Damian Smith that he could not bed Bobbie. Soon afterward, Lucy met Kevin Collins, who helped her become the kind and considerate person she had been under Dominique's influence, once again.

On Port Charles, Lucy's romantic involvement with Kevin continued, despite facing many challenges in their burgeoning relationship. After discovering that she had psychic abilities, she began to meddle in the lives of others, often placing herself in danger. To keep an eye on Serena, Lucy briefly married Rex Stanton, all the while remaining in love with Kevin. After Kevin suffered a mental breakdown, Lucy stood by his side, and the two planned to get married.

In December 2012, Lucy returns at the behest of Sabrina Santiago, who is attempting to resurrect the Nurses' Ball, but is having a difficult time finding financial backing. Although Lucy expresses a genuine desire to resurrect the ball, financial issues involving her company, CoeCoe Cosmetics, prevent her from doing so. As Sabrina resigns herself to her failure, much to the delight of Dr. Britt Westbourne, Lucy arrives at the hospital vowing to resurrect the ball. To accomplish this, Lucy plans to use her 1% share of ELQ to force either Tracy Quartermaine or A.J. Quartermaine, who are both vying for control of ELQ, to finance the ball. Ultimately, Lucy awards her share to Tracy, also requesting that she be allowed to move into the Quartermaine Mansion. In January 2013, Lucy has an encounter with John McBain and Samantha Morgan at Kelly's Diner, mistaking them for former Port Charles characters Caleb Morley and Livvie Locke. Believing "Caleb" to be a danger to "Livvie", she stabs John with a broken chair leg. Lucy is then arrested and taken to jail. Attorney Alexis Davis later represents her in court, where she gets Lucy to plead not guilty by reason of insanity and is admitted to Ferncliff. Lucy gets out of Ferncliff and helps create the Nurses Ball. She then begins her newest product, Deception.

== Reception ==
Toronto Star described Herring's debut on General Hospital as an "old movie cliché in reverse", writing: "Instead of mousey librarian taking off horn-rimmed glasses and turning into a ravishing beauty, former beauty queen Herring put her hair in a bun, scrubbed off her makeup, and walked off with the role of timid, frumpy Lucy Coe." During the 1980s and 90s, Herring was a fan favorite and considered one of the most popular characters on General Hospital. In October 1992, when it was announced that Herring would leave her role at Days of our Lives and return to the show as Lucy, The Daily News of Los Angeles praised the return of the "mousy librarian who turned manipulative bombshell" as great.

Herring has received a number of honors for her portrayal of Lucy, including Daytime Emmy Award nominations for Outstanding Supporting Actress in a Drama Series in 1990 and 1992. She also won three Soap Opera Digest Award for Outstanding Villainess in a Drama Series – Daytime in 1989, 1991, 1992, as well as a nomination in 1990. In 1996, she won the Soap Opera Digest Award for Hottest Female Star and in 1999, Herring won the Soap Opera Digest Award for Outstanding Lead Actress for her work as Lucy on Port Charles.

In 2023, Charlie Mason from Soaps She Knows placed Lucy at #25 on his ranked list of General Hospital’s 40+ Greatest Characters of All Time, commenting "Whenever she walks into a room, you know that chaos is going to follow — and we wouldn’t have it any other way. Lucy may not be the conniver that she once was, but she remains as “quacky” and unpredictable as ever."
