= John McBain (character) =

Fictional character from One Life to Live

- One Life to Live character
- Portrayed by: Michael Easton
- Duration: 2003–2013
- First appearance: October 1, 2003
- Last appearance: March 20, 2013
- Created by: Josh Griffith and Michael Malone
- Introduced by: Frank Valentini
- Crossover appearances: General Hospital
In-universe information
- Other names: Kevin Buchanan
- Occupation: Detective; Businessman; FBI agent Interim commissioner
- Parents: Thomas McBain; Eve McBain
- Siblings: Michael McBain; Theresa
- Spouse: Blair Cramer (2009)
- Sons: Liam McBain
- Nieces and nephews: Gabriel McBain; Unnamed child
- First cousins: Shannon McBain

John McBain is a fictional character on the American daytime dramas One Life to Live and General Hospital, portrayed by Michael Easton.

== Casting ==
Following the cancellation of GH spinoff, Port Charles, actor Michael Easton originated the role of FBI agent John McBain on OLTL on October 1, 2003. In 2006, there were reports that contract negotiations were not going well, and Easton would be leaving the show. Fans speculated he might join GH, where his former co-star, Kelly Monaco (Livvie Locke), had gone after the Port Charles cancellation. Other rumors included him returning to Days of Our Lives where he played Tanner. However, Easton reached an agreement, and was able to stay with OLTL until its cancellation in January 2012. When the cancellation of OLTL was first announced, Easton initially signed with Prospect Park to have his character move to the online version of OLTL. But when Prospect Park's plans fell through, Easton signed a contract with GH, making his debut on March 13, 2012. When several former Port Charles characters & actors were brought to GH, writers revisited the vampire storyline, and Easton started to play a dual role of John and an adaptation of his PC character Caleb Morley on GH in February 2013. Due to Prospect Park's renewed plans to revive OLTL in January 2013, Easton's contract came into question, making his future as McBain on GH unsure. Easton was forced to leave GH in February 2013 due to contract disputes, with his last show airing March 20, 2013. Easton returned to GH in May 2013 as a new character, Dr. Silas Clay.

== Storylines ==
Agent McBain arrives in fictional Llanview, Pennsylvania on October 1, 2003, looking to recruit Natalie Buchanan (Melissa Archer) for a pool tournament in Las Vegas, as part of an undercover operation. Natalie Buchanan accepts John McBain's offer to train her in the amateur circuit, unaware of the FBI plan to use her to take down Walker Laurence (Trevor St. John). After Natalie marries Cristian Vega (David Fumero), the couple head to Las Vegas, where Cristian is apparently killed by Walker Laurence. Natalie, completely broken after the death of her husband, blames John for knowingly putting her in the dangerous position where her husband was 'killed'. John and Natalie's interactions continue, and through John's gently offering Natalie support, John and Natalie grow closer despite Natalie remaining conflicted about the role he played in Cristian's apparent death. Natalie learns to forgive John, after realizing John had suffered a similar loss when his fiancée Caitlyn was killed 5 years prior.

The Music Box Killer storyline begins, and John remains in Llanview as the lead FBI agent to solve the series of murders. The Music Box Killer is revealed to be Stephen Haver (Matthew Ashford) who is also responsible for Caitlyn's death. After discovering John's attachment to Natalie, Haver kidnaps Natalie and straps her to a bomb in John's bed, intending for her to die the way Caitlyn had died. John, with the help of Bo Buchanan (Robert S. Woods) and Rae Cummings, captures Haver and John dismantles the bomb, saving Natalie. After Haver's arrest, Asa Buchanan sneaks a gun into the Llanview Police Department "LPD", and tries to convince John to kill Haver, John refuses. The FBI is dissatisfied with John's job performance on the MBK case, in response John quits. Bo offers John the lead detective position at the LPD, but he's unsure if he should take it. Natalie tells John he should take the position, when he asks her why, she reminds him his mother moved to town. John and Natalie kiss, discuss their feelings for one another. John admits there was something between them, before Cristian died. However, both decide they are not ready to move on; the situation with Haver brought up a lot of feelings John had about Caitlyn's death. Natalie tries to get a group of John's family and friends to convince him to stay, John accepts the lead detective position. Haver, although in police custody, arranges for John to be poisoned. Natalie saves John's life when she finds John unconscious in the alley behind Rodi's and gets him help. She later helps to nurse him back to health when he returns to his hotel room. While in his hotel room, Natalie discovers mementos from John's relationship with Caitlyn when John asks her to get a shirt from the drawer where the mementos are kept. She mentions nothing. Haver arranges his own death, and frames John for the murder. Natalie maintains John's innocence, hires him an attorney Evangeline Williamson (Renée Elise Goldsberry) but charges against John are dropped after Antonio Vega (Kamar de los Reyes) finds evidence. John and Natalie, begin to heal from the loss of their loved ones.

Caitlyn's sister and FBI agent, Katherine Fitzgerald, arrives in town looking for Paul Cramer (David Tom), a man Natalie begins a friendship with and John is leery of. Katherine wants to recover money stolen from the Santi organization she believes Paul has. Paul no longer has the money, and is pressured by John to testify against the Santis. Later, it is discovered by John and his brother Michael that Paul is being paid under the table by the chief of staff, Dr. Long to transport black market organs. John tries to discourage Natalie's involvement with Paul but despite John's numerous warnings, Natalie's friendship with Paul develops into a light hearted flirtation. John begins to struggle with his feelings for Natalie again, and letting go of his past with Caitlyn. John begins to allow himself to get closer to Natalie. On May 11, 2004, Natalie takes off with Paul to Atlantic City. An upset John follows. When John finds Natalie, he's unable to verbalize why he has followed her and she becomes upset and tells him, Paul is offering her fun, what can he offer her. In response, John kisses Natalie. When Paul interrupts, John tells Natalie he's heading back to Llanview and asks if she'll join him. Natalie accepts John's offer and apologizes to Paul for leaving. John and Natalie end up in bed together, but Natalie stops them from having sex because she feels John has not moved on from Caitlyn and doesn't want to be a stand in for a ghost. John remarks maybe she's the one with the ghost, referring Cristian. Natalie, in a gesture to prove she is moving on from Christian, removes her wedding ring. Natalie tells John, she saw his drawer filled with memories of Caitlyn, and he is still holding onto her. Natalie leaves, and despite John's request she wait on him, she later heads back to Atlantic City to see Paul. John, wanting a relationship with Natalie, finally lets go of Caitlyn. The timing is again off, as Natalie becomes stressed with her mother's heart transplant, and being accused of murdering Paul Cramer. John supports Natalie through these crises, but the two do not become a couple. After, her mother's recovery and Paul is discovered to be alive, Natalie wanting a change leaves town with Paul in search of the Santi fortune.

After a few encounters with Evangeline, John and Evangeline have sex while trapped in a basement. Evangeline breaks up with then-boyfriend R. J. Gannon (Timothy Stickney), and John and Evangeline decide to continue seeing each other. Evangeline decides to surprise John for a visit at his Angel Square apartment, only to find him playing cards on his bed with Natalie who he invited to watch a movie. An upset Evangeline runs out, but John follows, assuring her he and Natalie are just friends, and asking Evangeline not to give up on them. When Evangeline later admits she needs more from him, John agrees to "attach strings," and they begin officially dating. In November 2004, Paul Cramer is dead, and Natalie is John's lead suspect and Evangeline is her attorney. Natalie doesn't trust John, despite his pleas to help her and he is forced to arrest her. To get Natalie released, he digs up a judges' grave without a warrant and finds evidence linking someone else to the crime. John breaking the law to help Natalie causes conflict in his relationship with Evangelina. Natalie, realizing the lengths John has gone to help her, tells him what happened the night Cramer died and that she didn't kill him. John crosses Natalie off the suspect lists, and their friendship is strengthened.

November 2004, David Fumero starts a short-term contract to reprise his role of Cristian Vega, and an amnesiac Cristian turns up alive. Natalie believes despite changes in her husband's behavior and his memory problems, he feels like her husband. John is not convinced, and believes Cris is a dangerous threat to Natalie, so he pressures her to consider leaving him. To silence John's concerns, Natalie gives John Amnesiac Cristian's DNA to prove he is her husband. John and Natalie are both unaware Cristian has been programmed in captivity to kill his brother, Antonio Vega (Kamar de los Reyes) and his maternal cousin Tico Santi (Javier Morga). Cristian successfully kills Tico and is convicted for his murder As memories of his former life begin to return, Cristian accepts the consequences of his actions and goes to jail. To help Natalie and his family move on, he pretends he is, in fact, an impostor. John gets the DNA results proving the John Doe is in fact Cristian, but Cristian swears him to secrecy. Keeping Cristian's true identity from Natalie proves difficult, as his feelings for her continue to linger in spite of his relationship with Evangeline. When Evangeline tells him she loves him, John isn't able to say the same. Soon after, John and Evangeline break things off.

Eventually, John moves on to date Natalie, though he still fells guilt knowing Cristian's identity and not telling Natalie. Things begin to grow even more complicated when Evangeline becomes Cristian's lawyer in an attempt to get his prison sentence appealed, and discovers he is indeed Cristian. In November 2005, a prison riot led by Carlo Hesser (Thom Christopher) breaks out and John and Cristian are caught in the crossfire as Natalie discovers Cristian is indeed Cristian. Although John and Cristian make it out alive, Natalie is angry at both of them for lying to her, and no longer wants anything to do with either of them.

Natalie soon realizes she has fallen for John, and officially divorces Cristian. John becomes consumed with solving the decades-old murder of his father, police officer Thomas McBain. The unsolved crime has plagued John for years, but new evidence begins to surface, which leads to David Vickers (Tuc Watkins), Dr. Paige Miller, and ultimately, Dr. Spencer Truman (Paul Satterfield). On the day of Spencer's arrest, John is able to finally find peace with his father's death, and has asked his mother to give him her engagement ring (from his father) for Natalie. But, John is soon involved in a terrible car pile-up on the highway — he is killed, his body burned beyond recognition. The town mourns his death and prays Llanview Assistant District Attorney Hugh Hughes (Josh Casaubon) will survive after an accident. On the episode first-run November 10, 2006, it is revealed Hugh, badly burned and bandaged in a burn unit, is in fact John McBain. He ultimately recovers, aided by some tender loving care by Natalie. During his recovery, he tells Natalie he loves her. John's relationship with Natalie, a fledgling forensics expert, ends in 2007. Believing she is protecting John, she tampers with evidence at the crime scene of Spencer's murder. With John unable to get past the difficulties of his recovery and Natalie's overprotectiveness, she breaks up with him in April 2007.

John forms a bond with Dr. Marty Saybrooke (then, Christina Chambers; originated and later Susan Haskell) and her son Cole Thornhart (Brandon Buddy) in 2007, eventually helping her get out of her forced marriage to Miles Laurence (David Chisum). On episode first-run September 12, 2007, John is suspended from the police department, pending investigation into his role in withholding information about the true parentage of Tommy McBain. Tommy, the adopted son of John's younger brother Dr. Michael McBain (Chris Stack) and his wife Marcie (Kathy Brier), is Todd Manning's (St. John) biological son, thought murdered by Spencer Truman; when the truth comes out and Todd is awarded custody, Marcie flees town with the child. Though they dislike each other, John and Todd join up to pursue her across the country, as John wants to catch up with Marcie before Lee Ramsey, John's unpredictable FBI rival who is in charge of the case. When John and Todd end up in jail, Marty and Todd's ex-wife Blair Cramer arrive to bail them out, and to join in the search for Marcie. John and Marty bond further as Marty confesses to John her deceased husband, Patrick Thornhart, had been murdered. John and Marty have sex, but Marty soon disappears in New Orleans, and Cole vanishes from Llanview. With Marty and Cole kidnapped by the Irish terrorists who had killed Patrick, John and Lee follow. Their plan goes awry, and though Cole is saved, a van explodes with Marty inside on December 4, 2007, and she is presumed dead.

John and Blair Cramer (Kassie DePaiva) fall into bed together and begin a relationship, but the events surrounding Ramsey's death leave John with questions about Todd's involvement. John pieces together Ramsey had a mystery woman staying with him, and soon deduces she is now with Todd. Todd plays the hero to an amnesiac Marty, secretly saved and nursed back to health by Ramsey, but in a twisted pursuit of redemption, Todd fails to tell Marty that he had raped her years before, or that she has a son. She begins to fall in love with Todd, and he for her. On November 10, 2008, John breaks into Todd's home and finds Marty, soon realizing what Todd has been up to. The truth revealed to her, Marty lashes out, John beats Todd to a bloody pulp, and Todd is arrested. With Marty's return and John's obvious concern for her, Blair gives John the opportunity to end their relationship on good terms; he reassures Blair he is committed to their blossoming relationship. Todd is charged with kidnapping and rape; Marty is grilled on the stand by Todd's lawyer and ex-wife Téa Delgado (Florencia Lozano), her testimony actually used to exonerate Todd. Devastated, an unraveling Marty sets a plan in motion; professing to still love him, she lures a repentant and hopeful Todd to a New Year's celebration for two. On the roof of the Palace Hotel on January 2, 2009, she admits her deception and urges him to do the one thing that will make her happy: jump. He steps off the edge, and plummets into the water below. John pulls Todd out on the episode first-run January 5, 2009; Blair is relieved for the sake of her children, but Marty is furious.

Killings take place in early 2009, with letters left on the bodies that spell out KAD, Todd's old fraternity, where he, Powell Lord III (Sean Moynihan), and Zach Rosen raped Marty, when they were in college. Blair is the first to be attacked and not die, and Todd is a possible suspect in the case. Blair fears she will lose her children, so her lawyer Téa suggests she marry John, which surprises them both. After some talking, John proposes to Blair and she accepts. She is also granted custody of their children. In August, they plan to get an annulment, but he has the papers changed to say divorce, because he wants it on record his first marriage was Blair although the marriage was never consummated.

John began a relationship with Marty after his divorce from Blair. Marty is grateful when John saves Cole, Hope and Starr from drug dealers. John and Marty have sex and begin a relationship. In the fall of 2009 John reconnects with Natalie as he investigates Jessica's stalking and Jared Banks' (John Brotherton) beating. John is immediately suspicious of Jared and admits to Marty he does not like Jared simply because he is Natalie's husband. When Jared accusing him of still being in love with Natalie, John answers yes, and admits he will always care for her. Marty senses the effect John and Natalie have on each other, but John tells her, he and Natalie were a long time ago. The investigation reveals Mitch Laurence (Roscoe Born) is behind the stalking and Jared was blackmailed into helping, in order to protect his father Charlie Banks. When Jared is killed by Mitch, Natalie is devastated. John supports Natalie through her grief. When she stabs Mitch with a letter opener, John transfers the blood off the letter opener Natalie used unto his own letter opener leaving his fingerprints. John then hides the letter opener covered in Mitch's blood and his fingerprints in his drawer, and tells investigators Mitch stabbed himself.

When Mitch is interviewed, he tells Brody that John stabbed him. When Dorian, under the instruction of Mitch, brings forth John's hidden letter opener, John is charged with the crime. Natalie tries to confess, John continues to state he stabbed Mitch, and tells Bo that Natalie is trying to protect him. Marty questions John as to why he would risk everything for Natalie, and why he didn't consult her, his girlfriend, before framing himself. When John is arrested, Natalie tells her family John is covering for her and confesses to Bo. However, Marty arranges for Marty, Jessica, and Cole to come forward and admit to stabbing Mitch, the LPD having these new suspects coming forward forces John's release. Mitch gets Dorian to hire Mayor Lowell. He officially charges and arrests John for the attempted murder of Mitch. In February, Natalie and Brody break John out of jail so they can rescue Jessica who has been kidnapped by Mitch. As Natalie is driving, the car steers off the road as Natalie tries to avoid colliding with another car. Natalie is trapped and John gets her out before the car explodes. John finds a deserted cabin, where he takes Natalie. Natalie, suffering from a head injury, believes John to be Jared. John kisses the hallucinating Natalie and admits he loves with her. When Natalie realises her hallucinations are not real, John and Natalie admit they still have feelings for each other and kiss again as Marty enters the room. Although John tells Marty he wants to make it work with her, it is clear John has feelings for Natalie.

John visits Natalie at Llanfair and the two end up kissing again. Before John is able to tell Marty about his feelings for Natalie, he learns Marty is pregnant with his child from Natalie, who congratulates him, not realizing he did not know. After she leaves, Marty arrives and he questions her about it. They discuss it and he reassures her while he has no idea what he's doing, he wants to have the baby, and she's very happy and relieved. On St. Patrick's Day, John and Natalie stare at one another as he dances with Marty. After being pushed down the stairs, Marty and John discover their baby has been miscarried.

John and Natalie get back together, but she does not mention to him she had a one-night stand with Brody Lovett (Mark Lawson). Soon after, Natalie tells John she is pregnant and does not tell him about the possibility of Brody being the father. In December 2010, John asks Natalie to marry him because he loves her and wants her to be his wife. Despite her happiness, Natalie is hesitant due to Marty knowing the secret of her child's paternity but ultimately she lets herself accept. John wants to get married as soon as possible, and suggest they get married on New Year's Eve. John selects Brody as the best man, and Natalie chooses Jessica as her maid of honor. The couple say their vows and exchange rings but are never pronounced husband and wife as the wedding is interrupted by Marty.

John starts 2011, frantic, unable to locate Natalie, who spends the beginning of the New Year giving birth to their child in Asa's lodge. Marty, whom Natalie had kidnapped and brought to the lodge, delivered the baby. When John tracks Natalie, he finds both women and his newly born son. However, Marty suffers a psychiatric break and believes the newborn is the child she and John lost. John and Natalie end up naming the baby Liam Asa McBain, while Marty is sent to an institution after losing her sanity. John, unhappy that he and Natalie didn't get married on New Year's Eve, decides they can get married as soon as possible. Jessica and Brody decide John and Natalie can share their big day, by both getting married at the wedding being planned for Jessica and Brody. John and Natalie accept the offer of a double wedding. On the day of the wedding, Clint's employee, Vimal, stops the wedding and reveals the paternity switch he did on Jessica's child, and the fact Natalie also had a paternity test done. Natalie then tells John the paternity test for Liam says Brody is the father, and John leaves her, devastated. John initially sleeps with Kelly Cramer (Gina Tognoni) to hurt Natalie, but continues to do so for months. John is shown to be conflicted with his love for Natalie, but being hurt by her betrayal and his love for Liam but not being able to accept he was not the father. Marty is released from the institution, and is intent on getting John back.

Marty soon reveals to her psychiatrist she switched Natalie's paternity test. John is Liam's biological father. When Natalie finds out, she tries to tell John, only to be thrown off the roof by Marty. Marty also stabs Kelly, and escapes with Liam. Eventually, Marty leaves town, and Liam is found, and returned to Natalie and Brody. John and Natalie have a conversation about his inability to 'get past' Liam being Brody's even though he wants to. Natalie, believing John can never forgive her, decides to move on with Brody. John realizes he's still in love with Natalie, and breaks up with Kelly. When he goes to tell her, though, he finds out Brody proposed to Natalie, and she accepted. John decides to leave town and heads to Seattle to be with his brother's family. However, at the airport, Natalie shows up and tells John about him being Liam's father, and how Marty had switched the results. Natalie also found out Brody knew, and kept it a secret. Natalie and John go back to her house to be with Liam, only to find him gone. They realized Brody had taken Liam. They tracked Brody down to his family home, and he eventually handed Liam back. Natalie and John tried to talk about their relationship, but kept putting it off. After Natalie is kidnapped by Mitch, John saves her, and they reconcile.

"Todd Manning" is actually revealed to be Victor Lord, Jr., Todd's twin brother who had taken his place for eight years. Victor is found dead soon after, and John helps Téa try to find his killer. Initially, evidence points to Tomás Delgado (Ted King), Téa's brother, but both John and Téa figure out the real Todd Manning (Roger Howarth), recently returned, framed Tomás to cover up his crime. John arrests Todd in the finale.

John arrives in Port Charles after Blair calls him to inform him Todd has jumped bail to come there. John comes to the courthouse, where Todd is holding a gun on Sonny Corinthos (Maurice Benard), threatening to kill him because he believes Sonny is responsible for the car crash that killed his granddaughter Hope and her father Cole. John arrests Todd and takes him back to Llanview to stand trial for the murder of Victor. He is released, and comes back to Port Charles when Starr is arrested for trying to kill Sonny. John decides to return to Port Charles to take down Sonny, whom he blames for his half-sister Theresa's death years before. John's half sister was a new character created by Ron Carlivati to help facilitate the crossover. The explanation given to the audience why Teresa was never mentioned by Eve, Michael or Shannon McBain on One Life to Live was, John and Thomas McBain were the only family members which knew of her existence. Thomas McBain was shown on One Life to Live as a ghost and in recreations of John's history, but he did not mention Teresa on the show. John goes to see Anna Devane (Finola Hughes), whom John knew while he was with the FBI, and she is able to pull some strings to get him FBI clearance of 40 days to investigate Sonny. John makes it clear to Sonny he wants to take him down because he killed his sister, and Sonny maintains he is not responsible for her death. Sonny blames Joe Scully Jr. (Richard Steinmetz), and is proven to be true. During John's conversations with Anna, Anna warns him his need for revenge could cost him his family.

During this time, John meets Sam Morgan (Kelly Monaco), the pregnant wife of Sonny's enforcer Jason Morgan (Steve Burton). Sam confides in John about her problems with Jason and her pregnancy and that she was raped by Franco (James Franco). John uses his experience with the paternity debacle he went through with Natalie as a common ground they can relate. After Sam finds out Jason and Franco were twin brothers, John is able to get Sam a DNA sample of Franco from the FBI so she can have a paternity test done on her baby. After it is revealed the baby is Franco's and not Jason's, Jason cannot accept the baby and Sam moves out, at which point she leans on John for support even more. Jason doesn't like Sam spending time with John and is worried he is using her to take him and Sonny down.

John helps Sam give birth to her son, and tries to get help but is prevented by Jason's hired thugs. On the day Sam's baby (Danny Morgan) is born, Todd Manning and Heather Webber switch Sam's live baby with Téa Delgado's stillborn son, Victor Lord III. Téa tells John that Todd saved her son's life, and she takes the child home to Llanview, Pennsylvania. On a night when John is depressed about the role he might have played in his sister's death, and Sam is sad about the passing of her baby, John and Sam kiss, but decide they cannot go further. Todd, upset with John about the role Todd believes John played in the destruction of Todd and Blair, mails Natalie a photo of John and Sam kiss at the harbor. John, who had been back to living in Llanview, returns home with dinner to discover Natalie and Liam gone. Clint's driver arrives and delivers a note in Natalie's apparent handwriting telling him she hopes it was worth it referring to his cheating on her. John calls Natalie, and she tells him she's in london. Although John is prepared to follow her so that he can grovel for her forgiveness, he discovers she took his passport with her. John, upset his life is falling apart, returns to Port Charles to confront Todd for destroying his family by sending Natalie the picture. John receives a restraining order from Buchanan enterprises, where Natalie's father owns, supposedly filed by Natalie. Unable to stay in Llanview, John stays in Port Charles and enlists Alexis Davis (Nancy Lee Grahn), Sam's mother, to help him see his son again. John hopes once the restraining order is lifted, he and Natalie can reconcile. John gives up on that aspiration, when he gets a letter in Natalie's handwriting from Buchanan Enterprises telling him, she has moved on and is in love with someone else. Meanwhile, Jason approaches John with the suspicion Sam's child is alive, and was switched with Téa's baby. They get the proof, and John helps Sam and Jason reunite with the baby, and also helps Téa realize the truth about her son being stillborn.

Jason is shot the night Sam reunites with him, and presumed dead. John tries to help Sam deal with her denial over Jason being dead. Sam tells John that Heather tampered with the paternity test. Jason is her son's biological father. In November, John has been in Port Charles for a few months unemployed, waiting for Alexis to resolve his visitation. Alexis explains to John, his chances of getting to see his son again would improve if he can show he can provide for the child. As a result, John asks Anna, now Commissioner of PCPD, for a job. She hires him as Detective Dante Falconeri's (Dominic Zamprogna) partner. Together, with the help of Anna's ex, Robert Scorpio (Tristan Rogers), they capture Cesar Faison (Anders Hove), a wanted criminal who shares a history with Anna. John reveals to Sam that Faison was the one who shot Jason, helping her realize Jason is dead. The restraining order is later revealed to have been filed by Natalie's father, Clint Buchanan, without her knowledge. Clint felt John was not a worthy partner for his daughter, or father to his grandson, after he cheated on Natalie, while she was taking care of their son.

Once, when John is watching Danny, Sam's son, Lucy Coe (Lynn Herring) sees him, and calls him "Caleb," the king of vampires. Sam comes back, and Lucy calls her "Livvie." Lucy stabs John, and Sam takes him to the hospital. Lucy is declared insane, but later a woman named Alison Barrington (Erin Hershey Presley) shows up, and also calls John "Caleb." Soon after, Alison is found dead, and her son, Rafe Kovich, Jr. (Jimmy Deshler), becomes the primary suspect. At the station, however, Rafe points the finger at John as the killer, and there proves to be evidence to back it up. John is arrested soon after. John begins to believe Caleb does exist. He asks Lucy for help. She tells him Caleb is obsessed with "Livvie," who looks like Sam, and Rafe.

Todd is arrested after trying to escape from Ferncliff, and reveals he was trying to save Danny from "John." John realizes it was Caleb, and he's going after Sam and Danny. Anna comes later and says Sam & Danny are missing. John, Rafe, and Lucy later escape with the help of Sam's sister, Molly Lansing (Haley Pullos). John heads to Port Charles University with Lucy and Rafe, looking for clues. There, he finds out a musician named Stephen Clay went insane after the death of his wife, Livvie, and believed he was a real vampire. They track Sam, Danny, and Clay down to Wyndemere. There, John manages to kill Clay in self-defense, rescuing Sam, Lucy, Rafe and Danny. He, along with Rafe and Lucy, were released. Soon after, Anna told John the FBI was recalling him for a long-term assignment, and John left Port Charles.

== Reception ==
In 2011, Regan Cellura from Daytime Confidential wrote that, despite usually detesting the character, she felt bad for John due to Natalie revealing that he was not the father of her baby, adding "Was it the writing? The acting? Typically, I find both [Melissa] Archer and Easton a tad bit dull. Yesterday, boy oh boy was Easton on something. Dare I say it, was he exhibiting a little bit of fire?" Cellura also questioned how one could "not feel bad for John" in that "equation".
