= Soap Opera Digest Award for Hottest Female Star =

Television award category

- Awarded for: Hottest Female Star
- Country: United States
- Currently held by: Kristian Alfonso, Days of Our Lives, (1999)

The Soap Opera Digest Award for Hottest Female Star has been given every year since the 9th Soap Opera Digest Award in 1993 until 1999.

In the lists below, the winner of the award for each year is shown first, followed by the other nominees.

== Recipients ==
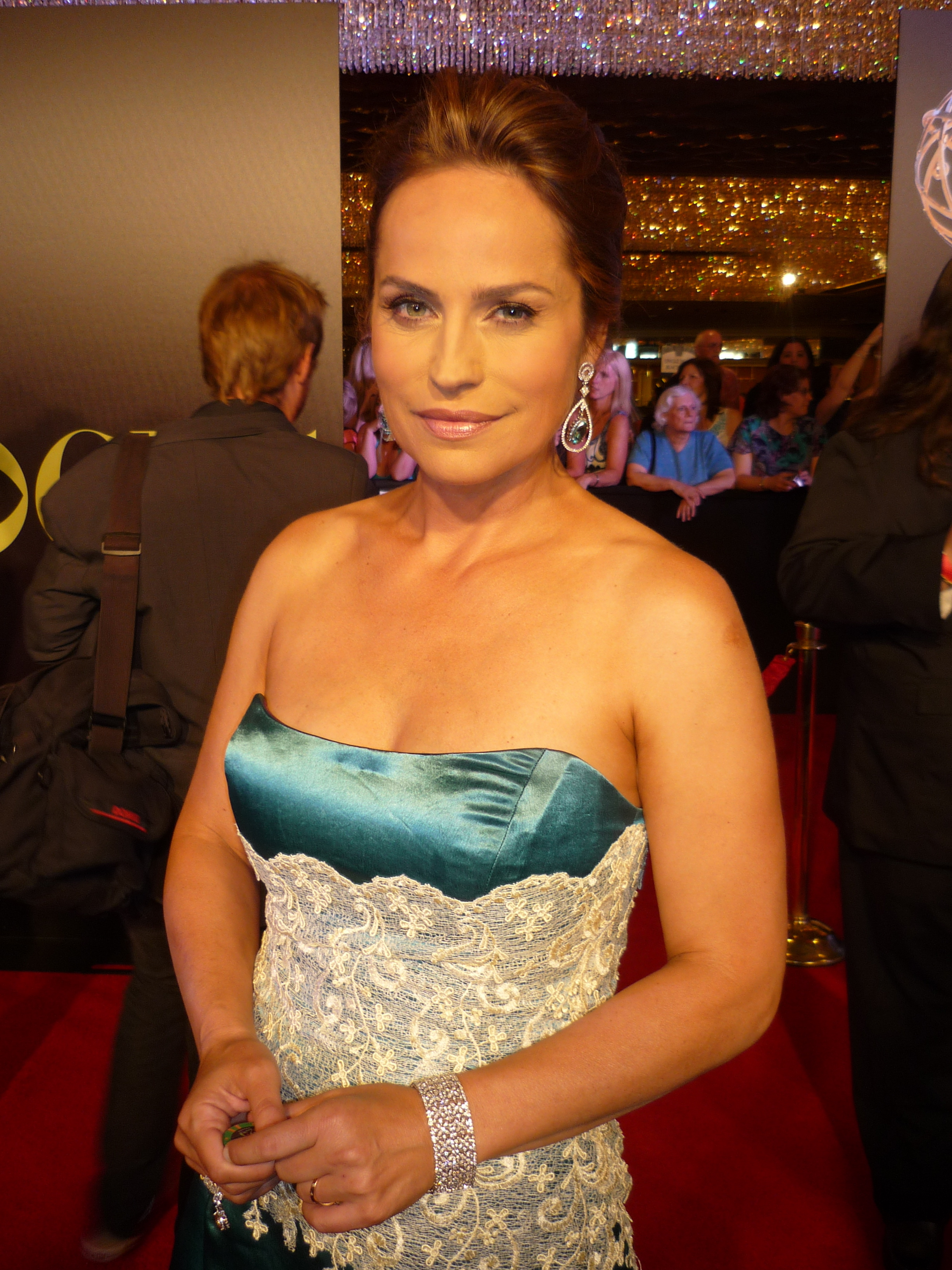
Crystal Chappell was the first winner for her role as Carly Manning.

| Year | Recipients | Program | Role | Network | Ref |
|---|---|---|---|---|---|
| 1993 | Crystal Chappell | Days of Our Lives | Carly Manning | NBC | |
| 1994 | Melissa Reeves | Days of Our Lives | Jennifer Horton Deveraux | NBC | |
| 1995 | Kristina Wagner | General Hospital | Felicia Jones | ABC | |
| 1996 | Lynn Herring | General Hospital | Lucy Coe | ABC | |
| 1997 | Vanessa Marcil | General Hospital | Brenda Barrett | ABC | |
| 1998 | Sharon Case | The Young and the Restless | Sharon Newman | CBS | |
| 1999 | Kristian Alfonso | Days of Our Lives | Hope Williams Black | NBC | |

== Total awards won ==
| Wins | Series |
|---|---|
| 3 | Days of Our Lives |
| 3 | General Hospital |
| 1 | The Young and the Restless |
