= Mark Teschner =

American casting director

Mark Teschner is an American casting director.

== Career ==
A native New Yorker, Mark Teschner has been the Casting Director of ABC Daytime's General Hospital since 1989. He has been described by Rolling Stone magazine as "an actor's casting director" and TV Guide noted his "unparalleled track record for finding top new talent." For his work on General Hospital he has received nine Emmy Awards and an additional 8 nominations. He is also a seven time recipient of the Casting Society of America's Artios Award and has received 16 additional nominations. He is a former vice president of the Casting Society of America and a former Governor for the Television Academy.

== Education ==
Cum Laude Graduate, Connecticut College, B.A. in English. Mark attended the National Theater Institute at the Eugene O'Neill Theater Center in the fall of 1978.

== Appearances ==
Numerous appearances including The Art Of Casting and E! Channel's Fight for Fame.

== Casting director credits ==
=== TV ===
- General Hospital (1989–present)
- General Hospital: Night Shift (2007–2008)
- Port Charles (1997–2003)
- Seven Girlfriends

=== Broadway ===
- Teddy & Alice
- Oh! Coward
- Corpse

=== Pre-Broadway ===
The Apprenticeship of Duddy Kravitz Liberties Taken

=== Off-Broadway ===
A...My Name is Alice Voyage of the Beagle Transposed Heads Rap Master Ronnie Little Victories Territorial Rites The Only Woman General Still Life Goodbye Freddy Green Fields Paducah December Seventh 1984 Just So!

=== Regional Theater ===
Camping with Henry and Tom The 24th Day Many Thousands Gone Tonight We Improvise Sweet Table at the Richelieu Year of the Duck Fatal Attraction Chekov in Yalta Wetter than Water A Walk out of the Water A Portable Pioneer and Prairie Show

== Awards and nominations ==
Daytime Emmy Award

- Win: 2006, 2007, 2008, 2011, 2012, 2014, 2015, 2016, 2018, 2021, 2023 Casting, General Hospital
- Nomination: 2002, 2003, 2005, 2008, 2009, 2010, 2013, 2017, 2019, 2020, 2022, 2024 Casting, General Hospital

Casting Society of America

- Nomination: 1992–1995, 1997–2000, 2000–2010, 2012 Casting, General Hospital
- Win: 1996, 2001, 2002, 2009, 2010, 2013, 2014, 2015 Casting, General Hospital
- Nomination: 1998, 2001, Casting, Port Charles
- Nomination: 2000, Casting, Seven Girlfriends (movie)
