= Teresa Castillo =

American actress

- Born: Teresa Ruth Castillo; October 14, 1983 (age 42); Long Beach, California, U.S.
- Occupations: Actress; singer; dancer
- Years active: 2005–present
- Spouse: Shane Aaron (m. 2008)
- Children: 2

Teresa Ruth Castillo (born October 14, 1983) is an American actress. She originated the contract role of Sabrina Santiago on General Hospital in September 2012.

== Personal life ==
Castillo was born in Long Beach, California, as the youngest of three daughters. She is of Spanish, Mexican, and Chinese ancestry. Castillo started performing in musicals at her high school. Castillo also studied dance at an all girls dance school in Hollywood.

Castillo met Shane Aaron when they worked in theater together at Disneyland. The couple started dating in May 2004 Aaron later became an event planner and the couple married in May 2008. On June 3, 2014, Castillo announced via Twitter that she had given birth to the couple's first child, a baby girl, Victoria Milani, on May 29. On July 27, 2015, Castillo announced via Instagram that she was expecting a son. On January 26, 2016, Castillo announced that she had given birth to a son, Sebastian James. The couple also has a Cocker Spaniel named Lady.

== Career ==
Castillo was scouted for the lead role of the film, Princess Diaries. She was later cast as Princess Jasmine in the live musical theater production of Aladdin at Disneyland. Castillo also appeared in commercials for McDonald's, Chevrolet and Clean & Clear. Castillo also pursued a career in music and as of 2008 was signed to Interscope Records as a part of a girl group. After advice from rapper Snoop Dogg (aka Snoop Lion), Castillo made the decision to focus on acting. Castillo guest starred on several prime time series including How I Met Your Mother and Bones. In 2012, Castillo auditioned for General Hospital after casting director Mark Teschner noticed her on Franklin & Bash. Castillo learned from her manager that she had booked the role several days later.

== Filmography ==
Film
Year	Title	Role	Notes
2011	Mamitas	Maria	Uncredited
2012	The Seven Year Hitch	Chandra	Television film

Television
Year	Title	Role	Notes
2010	Cold Case	Gina Lopresi	"Bombers"
2010	90210	Laura	"Sweaty Palms and Weak Knees"
2010	CSI: Miami	Alexis Wilkes	"Spring Breakdown"
2011	Bones	Heather Lakefish	"The Sin in the Sisterhood"
2011	iCarly	Ashley	"iHire an Idiot"
2011	Eagleheart	Rosa	"Me Llamo Justice"
2011	The Secret Life of the American Teenager	Regina	"Cute"
2011	Franklin & Bash	Lauren Gonzalez	"Bachelor Party"
2011	How I Met Your Mother	Maya	"Disaster Averted"
2012-2016	General Hospital	Sabrina Santiago	Regular role: September 19, 2012, to September 15, 2016
