= Port Charles =

American television series

- Genre: Soap opera; Medical drama; Supernatural; Fantasy
- Created by: Wendy Riche
- Developed by: Carolyn Culliton; Richard Culliton; Wendy Riche
- Starring: List of cast members
- Theme music composer: Martin Davich
- Country of origin: United States
- Original language: English
- No. of seasons: 6
- No. of episodes: 1,537

Production
- Executive producers: Wendy Riche (1997–1999); Julie Hanan Carruthers (1999–2003)
- Running time: 30 minutes

Original release
- Network: ABC
- Release: June 1, 1997 – October 3, 2003

Related
- General Hospital; General Hospital: Night Shift; One Life to Live

Port Charles (commonly abbreviated as PC) is an American television soap opera that aired on ABC from June 1, 1997, to October 3, 2003. It was a spin-off of the series General Hospital, which had been running since 1963 and takes place in the fictional city of Port Charles, New York. The show features longtime General Hospital characters Lucy Coe, Kevin Collins, Scott Baldwin, and Karen Wexler, along with several new characters, most of whom were interns in a competitive medical school program. In its later years, the program shifted more towards supernatural themes and stories, with a reduced emphasis on the original hospital setting.

== History ==
=== 1997–2000 ===
Plans to spin off General Hospital were announced in December 1996. ABC had previously passed on the idea of a GH spin-off proposed by former head writer, Claire Labine. Tentatively titled GH2, the series was set to revolve around interns at the medical school across from General Hospital. General Hospital executive producer Wendy Riche was hired to fill the same role for the new series, and partnered with married soap opera writers Carolyn and Richard Culliton—the latter of whom Riche had hired as co-head writer of General Hospital in September 1996—to co-develop the concept. (The Cullitons served as head writers of Port Charles from its debut until November 1997; Richard would subsequently be appointed head writer of the NBC soap Another World, where Carolyn had previously served and would rejoin as a staff writer.) Riche said of the new show, "This will be a multigenerational show, which is the kind of drama we've always done at GH". It was later announced that the series would be titled Port Charles, after the fictional city the series are set, and would star Jon Lindstrom and Lynn Herring, playing their roles from GH.

The series premiered with a two-hour prime time special, that aired on June 1, 1997. It started in its regular 12:30 p.m. Eastern timeslot the following day, replacing The City, a continuation of the previously cancelled Loving (the latter, like Port Charles, having also premiered as a feature-length nighttime special) that ended its 17-month run on March 28. (Edited 30-minute classic episodes of All My Children, One Life to Live, and General Hospital had filled the timeslot in the interim from March 31 to May 29.) The series also featured the return of General Hospital characters Scott Baldwin (Kin Shriner), and Karen Wexler (Jennifer Hammon). After the series premiered, it was unclear if Lindstrom, Herring, and Shriner would remain with the series. It was later confirmed the actors would stay on the show.

Riche later recalled the creation process by saying, "We knew that The City was probably not going to last. I was having lunch with Pat [Fili-Krushel] at some event. We were talking about The City and what to do with that timeslot. I said, 'If I were a programmer, I would start the ABC lineup with a half hour of the west wing of General Hospital with the interns in a learning hospital, and cap the day off with General Hospital. I would interface the characters in Port Charles with both wings of General Hospital.' Pat thought that was a great idea. She thought about it for a few hours, ran it by upper management, and told me to write it up. I sat down, wrote down some characters and storylines, sent her back some pages, and created the show. That was a natural bridge as a programmer. I had worked as a programmer at ABC and FOX so my head also thinks in those terms. We wanted to bring continuity to the show, which was Lucy, Kevin, and Scotty."

In the first episode, tenured nurse Audrey Hardy (General Hospital's longest-running character, portrayed by Rachel Ames) was injured and an intern had to operate on her with a power drill to save her life. Despite low ratings, Port Charles celebrated its first anniversary on June 1, 1998, as the series slowly continued to establish its own audience and improve in its time slot.

In its first few years, Port Charles developed a reputation for focusing most of its energies on the medical school program, setting more of its main action at Port Charles' General Hospital than was seen on the parent show, General Hospital. As it evolved, it turned its focus to stories with gothic intrigue that included themes such as forbidden love, vampires, and life after death (somewhat similar to the earlier series Dark Shadows, which also aired on ABC in the late 1960s and early 1970s).

In December 1999, Julie Hanan Carruthers was promoted to executive producer after Wendy Riche decided to step down from day-to-day oversight of the show to focus on General Hospital. Carruthers was the senior supervising producer of Port Charles, while serving the same role on General Hospital at the spin-off's inception.

=== 2000–2003 ===
In December 2000, it was announced that Port Charles would abandon the traditional open-ended style of storytelling in favor of 13-week story arcs similar to Latin telenovelas. Each arc is referred to as a "book", and has its own plot line. The approach was designed to attract more younger viewers, with shorter format being easier for many viewers to keep up with. ABC's head of daytime, Angela Shapiro said of format change, "It's not about the destination, it's about the journey, still, we need to come up with [quicker] stories that have a beginning, middle, and end." The new production model allowed the cast, crew, and writing staff to only work six months out of the year.

==== Cancellation ====
On June 27, 2003, Port Charles was cancelled by ABC after six years due to low ratings and financial concerns. The final episode aired on October 3, 2003. Brian Frons said of the decision to cancel the relatively young series, "This was an extremely difficult decision, we were very pleased with the creative execution of the show, but the 30 minute format in this time period posed significant financial challenges, which ultimately led to this decision." Since the program taped for only six months out of the year, the remaining episodes were aired with the cast not allowed to return to tape resolutions to storylines. This left the final episode as a cliffhanger; Caleb told Olivia that Alison (Erin Hershey Presley) was pregnant with his baby because of the wish that she (Olivia) made on his ring and it was revealed that Imani was a werewolf. ABC returned the 12:30 p.m. time slot to its affiliates after Port Charles ended its run.

After Port Charles, the characters of Scott Baldwin and Audrey Hardy returned to General Hospital, and many of the other actors from Port Charles moved on to play roles on other dramas, including a few who took on new roles on General Hospital, such as actors Kelly Monaco, Kiko Ellsworth, Eddie Matos, Kent King, and Jay Pickett.

==== Post-cancellation aftermath ====
The cancellation of Port Charles, along with ABC's relinquishing of what was historically a death slot at the time of the show's ending, resulted in a major impact on the first-run syndication market as ABC affiliates sought new programming to fill the open timeslot in the midst of the 2003–04 television season. The most significant impact occurred in the New York television market, where the cancellation created an opening on network flagship station WABC-TV. Taking advantage of this opening, syndication distributor Buena Vista Television reached an agreement to move Who Wants to Be a Millionaire (which had been canceled by ABC one year earlier) over to WABC's open 12:30 p.m. slot from WCBS-TV, which had been airing the program in the 4:00 p.m. timeslot since it premiered in first-run syndication in September 2002. This situation arose after WCBS picked up syndication rights to The People's Court for the 2003–04 season when WNBC, which had aired the program since it was revived in 1997, dropped it from its lineup. Millionaire continued to air in that time slot until September 2014, when it was moved to 2:00 p.m. (where it would remain until its withdrawal from syndication in 2019, apart from the 2015–16 season) in order to accommodate an extension of the station's noon newscast as a result of the cancellation of Katie. The second syndicated season of Millionaire premiered before Port Charles aired its last episode; as a result, some affiliates did not air the soap in its normal timeslot during its last few weeks.

In 2013, the writers of General Hospital revisited the final storyline of Port Charles after actors Michael Easton and Lynn Herring joined the show, putting their own spin on the PC storyline. Easton was now playing John McBain, a role he originated on the cancelled One Life to Live, while Herring would reprise her role as Lucy Coe. To work with the previous PC storyline, Easton started a dual role, playing both John and Caleb onscreen. At the conclusion of the story arc, it appeared the Caleb character had died; however, in the morgue after Lucy Coe left convinced he was dead, the true Caleb switched bodies with the Medical Examiner and walked out of the morgue.

== Cast of characters ==
Popular characters such as Lucy Coe, Kevin Collins, and Scott Baldwin moved from General Hospital to Port Charles at the start of the series. New characters were introduced as doctors and interns at the local medical school. These interns included brothers Joe (Michael Dietz) and Frank Scanlon (Jay Pickett), wheelchair user Matt Harmon (Mitch Longley), Julie Morris-Devlin (Lisa Ann Hadley), Eve Lambert (Julie Pinson), Karen Wexler (Jennifer Hammon), Chris Ramsey (Nolan North), Jake Marshak (Rib Hillis). Debbi Morgan portrayed the resident in charge of the new interns, Dr. Ellen Burgess. Morgan was widely known for her portrayal of Angie Hubbard on All My Children, Loving, and The City. The actress described her character, which was seen as a departure for Morgan, whose Angie was known as a generally nice character, by saying "She's everything I abhor in doctors-their abruptness, the lack of bedside manners that so many of them have. She's a talented doctor and brilliant at what she does. Her bedside manner just sucks!".

As the series progressed, the storylines became less centered around the interns, and as a result, many actors ended up leaving the series. Port Charles then started to introduce new, younger characters as a part of the supernatural storylines. These characters proved to be popular with fans and critics, mainly Alison Barrington (Erin Hershey Presley), Caleb Morley (Michael Easton), Livvie Locke (Kelly Monaco), and Rafe Kovich (Brian Gaskill).

When the series ended in 2003, Shriner returned to General Hospital, while Herring was not offered a place back on the show. The actress stated, "That was very disheartening. It never occurred to me that Lucy wouldn't still have a place in town if PC didn't work out. But you know what? Even knowing what I know now, I would still go off to do PC. I would not trade that fabulous experience for anything!" Several of the younger actors took roles on different shows, including Easton, who was cast as John McBain on One Life to Live. Monaco transferred over to General Hospital, but in the newly created role of Sam McCall. It was said that the supernatural elements of the storyline would have made it difficult for the writers to integrate Livvie into the series.

== Story arcs ==
Each 13-week arc of the story was referred to as a "book". There were a total of twelve books after the series switched to that format. In order, they were:

Book	Duration
Fate	December 4, 2000 – March 2, 2001
Time in a Bottle	March 5 – June 1, 2001
Tainted Love	June 4 – August 31, 2001
Tempted	September 3 – November 30, 2001
Miracles Happen	December 3 – 31, 2001
Secrets	January 2 – March 29, 2002
Superstition	April 1 – June 28, 2002
Torn	July 1 – September 27, 2002
Naked Eyes	September 30 – December 30, 2002
Surrender	December 30, 2002 – April 1, 2003
Desire	April 2 – July 4, 2003
The Gift	July 7 – October 3, 2003

== Crews ==
=== Head writers ===
Duration	Name
June 1 – October 13, 1997	Carolyn Culliton; Richard Culliton
October 14, 1997 – May 6, 1999	Lynn Marie Latham
May 7, 1999 – February 3, 2000	Scott Hamner
February 4 – March 1, 2000	No Head Writer Listed
March 2 – April 5, 2000	Karen Harris; Jonathon Estrin
April 6 – May 19, 2000	Karen Harris
May 22 – November 9, 2000	Karen Harris; Barbara Bloom
November 10, 2000 – October 3, 2003	James Harmon Brown; Barbara Esensten

=== Executive producers ===
Duration	Name
June 1, 1997 – December 24, 1999	Wendy Riche
December 27, 1999 – October 3, 2003	Julie Hanan Carruthers

== Reception ==
The series received mostly positive reviews from critics. In a review of the early months, The Tuscaloosa News compared the series favorably to General Hospital, "But all in all, this was quite an auspicious start for a new show. When Port Charles was conceived, this spin off was a companion piece to the highly successful General Hospital. Since then, General Hospital has lost not only its headwriter, but its direction." During the early days, many critics felt the series wouldn't make it, but it later proved to be a critical success. The series received particular acclaim during the vampire storylines. The Star-News wrote in a review of the "Tainted Love" arc, "Its well-placed edginess always underscores the danger. It was riveting. So was this story. We did not want it to end." The fast-paced style of storytelling has also been called "Edgy, unpredictable and extreme." The Vindicator described the change in the series by saying, "The series clipped along at an amazing pace and viewers became intrigued as more fantasy elements such as time travel and vampires were added to the mix. The show became the Dark Shadows of its time, and although the ratings were low, it continued to grow." ABC Soaps in Depth's list of 100 Greatest Daytime Couples included Rafe and Alison at number 92, and Caleb and Livvie at number 34.

In 2003, the series was nominated for a Daytime Emmy Award for Outstanding Drama Series.Zap2it included the series on its list of The Best and Worst TV Spinoffs since 1990, noting, ""Port Charles" never got the traction that its venerable parent show did, despite attempts to introduce the supernatural and a change in production to tell more contained story arcs. It lasted six years, and after its cancellation a few characters eventually returned to General Hospital." Entertainment Weekly included the series on their list of "15 Soap Operas We've Loved, Lost", noting, "What started off as a simple spin-off of General Hospital ended up venturing way out there, with vampires and werewolves stalking around Port Charles. Having GH folks like Lucy Coe (Lynn Herring) and Scotty Baldwin (Kin Shriner) leading the show made for an instant audience base. Some viewers couldn't get behind all the supernatural happenings (a vampire/human baby conceived by a wish upon a ring?), but hey, we got Kelly Monaco out of the deal."

== See also ==
- Vampire film
- List of vampire television series
