= Lynn Herring =

American soap opera actress (born 1958)

- Born: Sheryl Lynn Herring; September 22, 1958 (age 67); Enid, Oklahoma, U.S.
- Years active: 1980–present
- Spouse: Wayne Northrop (m. 1981; died 2024)
- Children: 2

Sheryl Lynn Herring (born September 22, 1958) is an American actress and beauty pageant titleholder. She is known for her role as Lucy Coe on the long-running soap opera General Hospital which she has played on and off since 1986.

== Early life ==
Herring was born in Enid, Oklahoma. Before acting, Herring was Miss Virginia USA 1977, and was 4th runner-up to Kimberly Tomes for the title of Miss USA 1977. She earned a B.A. in psychology from Louisiana State University.

== Acting career ==
Herring is best known for her work in daytime television, first portraying the role of mousy librarian Lucy Coe on General Hospital in 1986. Over time, Lucy became much more glamorous and man-hungry, and the role proved to be very lucrative for Herring. She left after six years to explore other opportunities, which led to a role on Days of Our Lives. Her character, Lisanne Gardner, was never fully developed, and Herring asked to be let out of her contract with the show. Days producers agreed, and she then returned to General Hospital.

She played Lucy on General Hospital until 1997, when she was asked to reprise her character on a spin-off series called Port Charles. She appeared on the series until it was canceled in 2003, and subsequently made a brief return to General Hospital in 2004.

She joined the cast of As the World Turns on July 24, 2009, as Audrey Coleman.

On November 2, 2012, after more than eight years off-screen, it was announced that Herring would return to General Hospital as Lucy in December. She first aired on December 17.

== Personal life ==
Herring was married to actor Wayne Northrop from May 1981 until his death in 2024. They had two sons: Hank Wayne, born on January 9, 1991, and Grady Lee, born on July 20, 1993, in Los Angeles. They owned and ran a working cattle ranch in the Raymond area of Madera County.

In a February 2007 interview, Herring's former co-star Kin Shriner said of Herring: "She's living a life that most women would love. She's going to restore an old train depot on land up where she lives and bring it back to a sort of museum quality. She's lobbying. She's back at school. She's working with animals. She's got her two boys. She's like Barbara Stanwyck in The Big Valley. She's running the whole town."

== Filmography ==
Year	Title	Role	Notes
Television
1980	Tenspeed and Brown Shoe	Gail	TV series Season 1, Episode 11 : "This One's Gonna Kill Ya"
1981	Quincy, M.E.	Stewardess Elaine Collier	TV series Season 6, Episode 10 : "Headhunter"
1982-83	Matt Houston	Cheerleader / Waitress	TV series Season 1, Episode 4 : "Killing Isn't Everything"; Season 2, Episode 11 : "The Outsider"
1983	Cutter to Houston	Red	TV series Season 1, Episode 6 : "Tell Me a Riddle, Daddy"
1983	Tucker's Witch	Linda Dawn	TV series Season 1, Episode 9 : "Rock Is a Hard Place"; Credited as Lynn Herring-Northrop
1984	Mickey Spillane's Mike Hammer	Georgette / Kiki Small	TV series Season 1, Episode 4: "Vickie's Song" (as Georgette); Season 1, Episode 8 : "Negative Image" (as Kiki Small); Season 1, Episode 9 : "The Perfect Twenty" (as Georgette)
1984	Jessie	Renee	TV series Season 1, Episode 2 : "The Lady Killer"
1984	Hotel	Carol	TV series Season 2, Episode 4 : "Transitions"
1984	T. J. Hooker	Simone	TV series Season 4, Episode 7 : "Model for Murder"
1984	Riptide	Lizzie Jackson	TV series Season 2, Episode 9 : "Peter Pan Is Alive and Well"
1985	Finder of Lost Loves	Waitress at Club	TV series Season 1, Episode 13 : "Deadly Silence"
1986	The Colbys	Lena	Soap Opera; Season 1, Episode 16 : "My Father's House"
1986–2001, 2004, 2012–	General Hospital	Lucy Coe	Soap Opera
1987	L.A. Law	Jessica Teicher	TV series Season 2, Episode 6 : "Auld L'Anxiety"
1992	Days of Our Lives	Lisanne Gardner	Soap Opera
1997–2003	Port Charles	Lucy Coe	Soap Opera
2009	As the World Turns	Audrey Coleman	Soap Opera; 26 episodes
Film
1979	Roller Boogie	Featured Skater	Uncredited
1982	Pandemonium	60's Cheerleader	Feature film
1984	Gone Are the Dayes	Girl #2	Television Movie
1995	Never Say Never: The Deidre Hall Story	as Herself	Television Movie

== Awards and nominations ==
Year	Award	Category	Work	Result	Ref
1989	Soap Opera Digest Awards	Outstanding Villainess – Daytime	General Hospital	Won	
1990	Daytime Emmy Awards	Outstanding Supporting Actress in a Drama Series	General Hospital	Nominated	
1990	Soap Opera Digest Award	Outstanding Villainess – Daytime	General Hospital	Nominated	
1991	Soap Opera Digest Award	Outstanding Villainess – Daytime	General Hospital	Won	
1992	Daytime Emmy Award	Outstanding Supporting Actress in a Drama Series	General Hospital	Nominated	
1992	Soap Opera Digest Award	Outstanding Villainess – Daytime	General Hospital	Won	
1996	Soap Opera Digest Award	Hottest Female Star	General Hospital	Won	
1999	Soap Opera Digest Award	Outstanding Lead Actress	Port Charles	Won	

Preceded by Donna Dixon	Miss Virginia USA; 1977	Succeeded by Robin Schadle
