= A. J. Quartermaine =

Fictional character from General Hospital

- General Hospital character
- Sean Kanan as A. J. Quartermaine
- Portrayed by: Eric Kroh (1979–1983); Abraham Geary (1983–1986); Jason Marsden (1986–1987); Justin Whalin (1987–1988); Christopher Nelson (1988–1989); Gerald Hopkins (1991–1992); Sean Kanan (1993–1997, 2012–2014); Billy Warlock (1997–2005)
- Duration: 1979–1989; 1991–2003; 2005; 2012–2014
- First appearance: December 13, 1979
- Last appearance: April 29, 2014
- Created by: Pat Falken Smith and Margaret DePriest
- Introduced by: Gloria Monty (1979, 1991); Jill Farren Phelps (2005); Frank Valentini (2012)
- Book appearances: Robin's Diary
- Billy Warlock as A. J. Quartermaine
In-universe information
- Other names: Alan James Quartermaine Jr.; Jason Adair; Crane Tolliver (2008–2012); Jason Morgan
- Occupation: Businessman; City Councilman; Gym Manager
- Family: Quartermaine
- Parents: Alan Quartermaine; Monica Quartermaine
- Sisters: Emily Quartermaine (adoptive)
- Half-brothers: Jason Morgan; Drew Cain
- Half-sisters: Emily Quartermaine (adoptive); Skye Quartermaine (adoptive); Dawn Winthrop
- Spouse: Carly Benson (1999–2000); Courtney Matthews (2002–2005)
- Children: Michael Corinthos
- Grandchildren: Wiley Cooper-Jones; Amelia Corinthos; Daisy Gilmore
- Grandparents: Edward Quartermaine; Lila Quartermaine
- Uncles: Bradley Ward; Jimmy Lee Holt
- Aunts: Tracy Quartermaine; Veronica Bard
- Nephews: Jake Webber; Danny Morgan; Oscar Nero
- Nieces: Lila Rae Alcazar (adoptive); Scout Cain
- First cousins: Ned Quartermaine; Justus Ward; Faith Ward; Dillon Quartermaine; Austin Gatlin-Holt

A. J. Quartermaine is a fictional character from General Hospital, an American soap opera on the ABC network. He was born on-screen in 1979 as the only biological child of the iconic Drs. Alan Quartermaine and Monica Quartermaine. A.J. was originally believed to be Rick Webber’s son until tests determined he was Alan’s. He was "SORASed" in 1991, revising his birth year to 1973. The role has been most notably portrayed by the actors Sean Kanan from 1993 to 1997 and Billy Warlock from 1997 to 2003, with a brief return in 2005. Kanan made his on-screen return as A.J. on October 26, 2012, after a 15-year absence. Kanan announced in March 2014 that he would once again be leaving the series, voicing his disappointment over the writing for the character.

== Casting ==
The newborn A.J. was portrayed by child actor Eric Kroh from 1979 to 1983. Abraham Geary portrayed A.J. April 16, 1983 continuing the part through Spring 1987. The role was also portrayed by Jason Marsden (1986–1987), Justin Whalin (1987–1988), Christopher Nelson (September 26, 1988 – 1989). On June 20, 1991, Gerald Hopkins stepped in the role of A.J. on contract and last appeared on December 30, 1992. The role was recast with Sean Kanan, who made his first appearance in the role on February 16, 1993. Kanan last appeared in the role on June 10, 1997. Kanan received a nomination for the Soap Opera Digest Award for Best Newcomer for his portrayal of A.J. in 1994.

Following Kanan's departure, actor Billy Warlock was hired for the role of A.J., and he made his debut on June 13, 1997. In 2003, Warlock earned a pre-nomination for the Daytime Emmy Award for Outstanding Supporting Actor in a Drama Series for his portrayal of A.J. Warlock departed from the series and his last episode aired on December 11 2003, amongst rumors that he was fired after disputes with show executives; the network replied his exit was due to lack of storyline.

In early 2005, the network's announcement of Warlock's return as A.J. was briefly put on hold, speculated as contract disputes. Warlock's return first aired on February 4, 2005, and shortly thereafter Warlock announced his return to the NBC soap opera Days of Our Lives as Frankie Brady. Warlock's exit lead to rumors of Kanan's possible reprisal of the role, who had recently announced move to recurring status in his role as Deacon Sharpe in the CBS Daytime soap opera The Bold and the Beautiful. Warlock exited the series in April 2005 and the character was killed off.

On September 17, 2012, Kanan revealed in an interview with TV Guide's Michael Logan that he was put on contract with General Hospital, but his character was not being announced. Rumors arose that Kanan might replace Steve Burton in the role of A.J.'s brother, Jason Morgan; the resemblance between the two fed into the rumors. Kanan first appeared on October 26, revealed to be A.J., retconing the character's death. On March 17, 2014, it was announced that Kanan would once again be leaving the role of A.J.

== Storylines ==
=== 1979–1990 ===
Alan James Quartermaine Jr. was introduced in December 1979, during a severe snow storm. At the time, his mother, Monica (Leslie Charleson) is on bed rest when is visited by co-worker, Dr. Lesley Webber (Denise Alexander) and her foster mother, Dr. Gail Baldwin (Susan Brown). The three women end up stranded when Monica goes into labor. As Lesley helps deliver the child, a delirious Monica admits that the infant is actually the son of Lesley's husband, Dr. Rick Webber (Chris Robinson). Monica's husband, Alan (Stuart Damon) unaware of the affair must deal with his evil sister Tracy (Jane Elliot) planting seeds of doubt about Alan Jr.'s paternity. In early 1980, it is discovered that Alan Jr. has a heart condition and Rick comes back to Port Charles to perform the surgery. Rick soon confronts Alan, who is already aware of Alan Jr's paternity and claims the infant. However, Monica later discovers that Alan Jr. carries a birthmark identical to Alan's and a DNA test later confirms that the child is Alan's son. In 1981, Alan has an affair and had an illegitimate son, Jason with Susan Moore (Gail Ramsay). Monica and Alan separate when he moves in with Susan, and Monica files for sole custody of Alan Jr. However, they soon reconcile and Susan sues the Quartermaines for Jason's inheritance. After Susan's murder, Monica adopts Jason as her own. In 1987, signs of trouble erupt when Alan Jr. (feeling neglected by his troubled and busy parents) runs away and turns up at Kelly's diner. Knowing that his parents would be worried, Ruby notified Alan and Monica of his whereabouts. Alan Jr. and Jason are seen again when Monica, running for assistant chief of staff, has a picture taken with them to improve her public image. In 1988, Alan Jr., now known as A.J., is sent off to boarding school although he is home for a visit when his aunt Tracy returns to town.

A.J. graduates from boarding school in June 1991, which re-establishes his birth year as 1973. In early 1993, A.J. is aged again, re-establishing his birth year as 1969. In 1998, his birthday is celebrated on November 18.

=== 1991–1999 ===
Alan Jr., now going by the name A.J., leaves school and lands in jail for drunk driving. A.J. blames his troubled childhood while his grandmother, Lila (Anna Lee), promises to give A.J. and his cousin, Ned (Wally Kurth), their inheritance if they can stay out of trouble for six months. Meanwhile, A.J.'s parents remarry and his younger brother Jason returns home from boarding school. A.J. takes pleasure in reminding Jason that he is illegitimate. Meanwhile, Nikki Langton comes to town looking for revenge against Monica for her father David's death. When her malpractice suit against Monica fails, she begins dating A.J. Nikki soon tricks A.J. into proposing marriage so she can get her hands on the Quartermaine fortune. In November 1992, A.J. is devastated when Nikki leaves him at the altar after Alan pays her to leave town. A.J. turns back to alcohol to numb the pain.

After learning about his father's schemes, A.J. tracks Nikki to Malibu and attempts to win her back, but she has already married another man, prompting A.J. to begin drinking even more. In 1993, A.J. has an affair with Ned's former lover, Julia Barrett, before she leaves town. Meanwhile, Alan becomes infatuated with Rhonda Wexler, much to Monica's dismay. After Rhonda is beaten up by her ex-boyfriend, Ray Conway, and Alan threatens him, Ray is discovered dead. A.J. finds Alan's cuff link at the scene and Alan confesses to the crime. A.J. frames Jagger Cates (Antonio Sabàto Jr.) for the murder to protect his father. In 1995, Alan and Monica adopt the orphaned Emily Bowen. In 1996, A.J. gets into a drunken car accident with Jason in the passenger seat, causing Jason to suffer severe brain damage. Ned covers for A.J., whose guilt begins eating away at him. Jason wakes up from a coma and, having no recollection of his past, walks away from his family.

In March 1997, A.J. has a drunken one-night stand with the scheming Carly Roberts (Sarah Joy Brown). Fortunately for Carly, A.J. has no memory of the escapade. Soon, Carly announces she is pregnant and reunites with Tony Jones (Brad Maule). Fearing that A.J. would eventually remember the night the child was conceived, Carly drugs A.J., leading everyone to believe he had relapsed. However, Carly's plan backfires and A.J. stays in town. After being hypnotized, A.J. remembers his night with Carly and confronts her. He promises to hide it from Tony, but demands a DNA test when the baby is born. Meanwhile, the Quartermaines are shocked when it comes out during Monica's sexual harassment trial that she and Ned had had an affair years before, and several of the Quartermaines fell off the wagon, including A.J. His drinking grows worse, and he eventually admits to being behind the wheel the night of the car accident with Jason. A.J. also becomes infatuated with Jason's ex-girlfriend, Keesha Ward, but she rejects him.

Carly welcomes her son Michael in December 1997 and fears Tony and A.J. may learn the truth and try to take the boy away from her. Carly lies and claims Jason (Steve Burton) is Michael's father while she leaves town to deal with postpartum depression. In 1998, A.J. meets his son when Jason's girlfriend, Robin Scorpio (Kimberly McCullough), asks him to babysit Michael. A.J. decides to patch things up with Carly to please his grandfather, Edward (John Ingle), who is adamant about keeping the Quartermaines together under one roof. A.J. eventually wins Carly over and they marry on May 26, 1999, at the Quartermaine mansion, much to the dismay of both Alan and Monica. However, A.J. has difficulty bonding with Michael, who has become attached to Jason. A.J. always suspects Carly of having an affair with Jason, and when Carly announces she is pregnant, he assumes Jason is the father.

=== 2000–2003, 2005 ===
A.J. agrees to pass the child off as his own, to get revenge on Jason for hiding Michael's paternity. A.J. is furious when he learns that Carly's child is actually fathered by Sonny Corinthos (Maurice Benard) and Sonny comes to claim the unborn child. In May 2000, Carly and A.J. get into an argument and she ends up falling down a flight of stairs, causing a miscarriage. A.J. is later disinherited by his family and forced to move out of the mansion. Meanwhile, Sonny and Carly scheme to gain custody of young Michael. Sonny kidnaps A.J. and threatens him into signing over his parental rights to Michael; Sonny later adopts Michael. A.J. became even more self-destructive and destroyed his relationship with Hannah Scott when nearly died from alcohol poisoning. When Monica has a health scare, A.J. decides to move back into the mansion and reconciles with his family. A.J. also bonds with his long-lost sister, Skye Quartermaine (Robin Christopher), who also is an alcoholic. Together, they plan to bring Michael back into the Quartermaine fold. In January 2002, A.J. begins pursuing Sonny's younger sister, Courtney Matthews (Alicia Leigh Willis) in an effort to drive Sonny crazy and get Michael back.

In April 2002, A.J. marries Courtney and Sonny nearly kills him. A.J. offers to give Courtney a divorce if he gave Michael back but Sonny refuses the offer. A.J. eventually falls for Courtney and gave up his family for her. Sonny instructs Jason to watch over Courtney and A.J. is jealous of their budding relationship. He turns to alcohol and crashes his car through the Oasis strip club. Courtney becomes a stripper at the club to pay off his debt. A.J. burns down the club and Courtney convinces Jason to cover for him. Wanting Courtney to depend on him instead of Jason, A.J. hires the former owner of the Oasis, Coleman Ratcliffe (Blake Gibbons) to terrorize Courtney; however the plan backfires when Courtney learns the truth. Courtney wants to end the marriage and A.J. swears revenge on Jason. He teams up with Skye to frame Jason and Brenda Barrett (Vanessa Marcil) for the murder of Luis Alcazar (Ted King). A.J. gets his chance to run ELQ when he becomes CEO after Ned is falsely accused of rape. However, A.J.'s efforts to redeem himself came up short and he became involved with Lydia Karenin. The couple left town together after A.J. emptied his entire family's bank accounts.

A.J. returns in February 2005 to reveal that he and Courtney are still legally married when she announces her engagement to Jasper Jacks (Ingo Rademacher). A.J. also kidnaps Sonny's kids including Michael; he fakes Michael's death and attempts to leave the country with the boy. Instead, A.J. returned to the Quartermaine mansion and Alan attempts to help his son. Jason finally comes to the rescue and A.J. ends up shooting Alan during a confrontation with Jason. A.J. ends up in the hospital with a broken back, and he is apparently murdered by Dr. Asher Thomas on April 26, 2005. Years earlier, A.J. hired Dr. Thomas to kill Jason and Alan had been using the information to blackmail him. Michael is initially one of the suspects but his name is cleared after the truth is discovered.

=== 2012–2014 ===
A.J. resurfaces alive in October 2012, appearing at the Quartermaine Estate to console Monica after Jason's death. It is revealed that after being murdered, A.J. was revived by Monica and Steven Webber, who then smuggled him out of the hospital to a rehab facility overseas, while everyone was led to think he had died. After being warned by Monica not to leave the estate, due to the pending charges still against him, he leaves and makes contact with Michael (Chad Duell), wanting to be the father to him that he should have always been. Michael makes his intentions known that he wants nothing to do with A.J.; however, after Carly (Laura Wright) confesses the truth about her relationship with A.J., he begins to open up to the idea of hearing him out. Carly begins to believe A.J. is alive after seeing him briefly on the docks. When she goes to ask Monica about A.J., she catches A.J. and Michael together. Despite Michael's protesting, Carly calls Dante Falconeri (Dominic Zamprogna), who arrests A.J. on the charges against him. Monica arranges for house arrest for A.J. by putting the mansion up as collateral. Tracy convinces A.J. that Michael is in trouble, making him cut off his ankle monitor to help him. When he finds Michael, A.J. meets Sam Morgan (Kelly Monaco), Jason's widow, and their son, A.J.'s nephew, Daniel. Thanks to Tracy's schemes, A.J. is arrested again but he is released on bail thanks to his lawyer, Diane Miller (Carolyn Hennesy) convincing the judge of Tracy's treachery. On November 20, A.J. is devastated when Edward passes away before he gets a chance to see him again. He reconnects with his sister Skye and meets his niece Lila Rae Alcazar, when they return for Edward's funeral. As of December 2012, Diane successfully gets all the charges against A.J. dropped in exchange for A.J. proving information on criminal, Cesar Faison (Anders Hove).

AJ battles for an extended period in 2013 for control of the Quartermaine business, ELQ, with Tracy Quartermaine after Jerry Jacks (Sebastian Roché) ordered Robin Scorpio-Drake to revive his henchman Franco and make him Jerry's look-alike to poison Pickle Lila and Pickle Eddie before the starting of The Chew. After the reveal that Kiki Jerome (Kristen Alderson) is not a Quartermaine, Tracy reclaims the CEO position. A.J. is accused of murdering Connie Falconeri (Kelly Sullivan) when he has a drunken night and the letters AJ is written in blood. Sonny arrives at the Quartermaine mansion with a gun prepared to murder A.J. in retribution, but Michael manages to talk his stepfather down, warning him that if Sonny were to kill A.J. it would mean he's lost both his fathers, as Michael would never forgive him. Sonny leaves, and A.J. is arrested – though he continues to have no memory of committing the crime.

A.J. finally gets his day in court during the November sweeps with Michael and Kiki at his side. He is later acquitted of the crime, as "there was just not enough evidence to convict an innocent man". A.J., torn by the verdict because he feels guilty, continues to drink excessively. Through his drinking, A.J. begins to have flashbacks about the night of the murder. In one of these, he remembers that Ava was there on the night of Connie's murder. When he confronts her, Ava retains her innocence. However, in February 2014, A.J., after seeing Connie in illusions and having survived a botched assassination, begins to become more confident that Ava murdered Connie. In March 2014, after confronting Ava about killing Connie, Sonny walks in and shoots A.J. Julian is mistakenly found over A.J's body when police officers Anna Devane (Finola Hughes) and Nathan West (Ryan Paevey) arrive to Ava's apartment. A.J. falls into a coma, waking up twice, to tell Michael that Julian Jerome (William deVry) didn't shoot him, and the second time to tell Carly that Sonny shot him. A.J. dies after begging Carly to stay and telling her Sonny shot him, not giving her enough time to get to a nurse. His spirit haunts Sonny and is then ushered into heaven by Emily where he is greeted by his grandparents, Lila and Edward.

== Reception ==
In 2023, Charlie Mason from Soaps She Knows stated that A.J. had "never met a plot that he wouldn’t hatch".
