= Monica Quartermaine =

Fictional character from General Hospital

- General Hospital character
- Leslie Charleson as Monica Quartermaine
- Portrayed by: Patsy Rahn (1976–1977); Leslie Charleson (1977–2023); Patty McCormack (2018); Holly Kaplan (2022)
- Duration: 1976–2023
- First appearance: 1976
- Last appearance: December 21, 2023
- Created by: Eileen Pollock and Robert Mason Pollock
- Introduced by: Tom Donovan
- Book appearances: Robin's Diary; The Secret Life of Damian Spinelli
- Spin-off appearances: Port Charles; General Hospital: Night Shift
In-universe information
- Other names: Monica Bard; Monica Webber
- Occupation: ELQ shareholder (5%); Chief of Staff at General Hospital; Chief cardiologist at General Hospital
- Family: Quartermaine
- Adoptive mother: Gail Adamson (foster)
- Sisters: Veronica Bard
- Spouse: Jeff Webber (1976–1977); Alan Quartermaine (1978–1990, 1991–2007)
- Sons: A. J. Quartermaine
- Daughters: Dawn Winthrop
- Adoptive sons: Jason Morgan; Andrew Cain
- Adoptive daughters: Emily Quartermaine
- Stepdaughters: Skye Quartermaine (adoptive)
- Grandsons: Michael Corinthos; Jake Webber (adoptive); Danny Morgan (adoptive); Oscar Nero (adoptive)
- Granddaughters: Emily Cain (adoptive)
- First cousins: Lorena Sharpe-Barrington

Monica Quartermaine is a fictional character from General Hospital, an American soap opera on the ABC network, played from August 17, 1977, to December 21, 2023, by Leslie Charleson. She is a cardiologist at the eponymous hospital, and widow of physician Alan Quartermaine (Stuart Damon). The role was originated by Patsy Rahn in 1976, who played the role until showrunners replaced her with Charleson. At the time of Charleson's death in January 2025, her tenure in the role was one of the longest in American soap operas.

== Character and casting ==
Monica becomes Chief of Staff at General Hospital following the death of her husband, Alan Quartermaine. Her specialty is cardiology. She was previously married to fellow doctor Jeff Webber. Her various affairs, primarily involving Jeff's older brother Rick Webber, and her quarrels with her second husband Alan and their dysfunctional family were all major stories on the show throughout the late 1970s, 1980s and 1990s.

In her time on the show, Monica has battled breast cancer and dealt with outliving four of her children. She is the owner of the Quartermaine mansion, as she often reminds her family when they begin quarreling. She has been known to throw them out of her house.

In 2006, she only had rare appearances. New storylines developed in 2007 (an investigation into the murder of Rick Webber and the deaths of her husband and daughter Emily Quartermaine), and she has since featured more prominently.

With the returns of Denise Alexander (Lesley Webber), Genie Francis (Laura Spencer), and Kin Shriner (Scott Baldwin), Monica remains the fourth oldest character on General Hospital and Charleson is the show's most tenured performer.

On August 24, 2010, it was announced that Charleson was being demoted to recurring status. In May 2011, newly appointed head writer Garin Wolf expressed his interest in having Charleson appear on a much more frequent basis.

In April 2018, it was announced that due to an injury Charleson sustained, the soap would temporarily recast the role of Monica to handle the advanced writing required for the character; Patty McCormack was announced as Charleson's temporary replacement, first appearing on May 7, 2018. Holly Kaplan filled in for Charleson for a single episode on March 15, 2022.

Charleson made several returns as Monica in 2023, with her final episode airing December 21 of that year. Charleson died on January 12, 2025.

== Storylines ==
=== Background ===
Monica grows up off-screen in an orphanage and was fostered by Dr. Gail Adamson Baldwin. Greg, Gail's husband, took advantage of Monica and raped her. Gail remained unaware of this for many years but they were able to reconcile once the truth came out. Monica was able to use her experience with Greg to help Laura Spencer when she was raped.

Monica later had an affair with David Langton and gave birth to a daughter, Dawn, whom she gave up for adoption.

Just prior to her arrival on General Hospital, Monica had been engaged to Rick Webber. He broke up with her and flew off to Africa where he became involved in a civil war and was presumed dead. Monica turned to Jeff Webber, Rick's brother, for comfort and married him, not knowing that Rick was still alive.

=== 1970s ===
Monica arrived in Port Charles in 1976, having recently married Jeff Webber. Steve Hardy, who had been recently appointed as Chief of Staff at General Hospital, invited the couple to take part in his Mr. and Mrs. Intern Programme, believing that the couple had an idyllic marriage. The truth was that Monica had only married Jeff on the rebound. She was still deeply in love with Jeff's brother, Rick, who had been presumed dead in Africa. The marriage collapsed when Rick was revealed to be still alive; Monica had an affair with him and Jeff had one with Heather Grant that produced a son, Steven Webber. Jeff and Monica divorced in 1977.

During this time, Rick grew close to Lesley Faulkner and planned to marry her. Monica was devastated, and tried to put a stop to it by blackmailing Lesley: unless Lesley refused his proposal, Monica would reveal her affair with Rick to the board of trustees, denying Rick the opportunity to become Chief of Cardiology. During the argument, a pregnant Lesley fell down the stairs and miscarried. Lesley was despondent and called off her engagement to Rick. Meanwhile, Monica and Rick talk about how important the promotion is to Rick. Monica realizes she cannot go through with her threat, but doesn't tell Lesley. Monica is caught when Lesley's daughter, Laura, reveals that she recorded Monica's threat to Lesley. Lesley and Rick are married in October 1977.

Rick and Monica's relationship becomes embittered, and Monica nearly loses her job, though Lesley sets aside her personal feelings and vouches for Monica's talents as a doctor to Steve, saving her job. Monica claims to be moving on, but she and Rick are forced to work together with Dr. Alan Quartermaine on plans for a new wing at the hospital. Monica makes a last-ditch effort to bed Rick while trapped in a remote ranger station overnight during a storm while working on the project, but is turned down. While Monica continues to antagonize Lesley and Rick, she soon begins a relationship with Alan, though she's still very much attracted to Rick.

Monica had doubts about her relationship with Alan, but these were soon overshadowed when Monica's foster mother Gail Adamson discovered that Monica had slept with Gail's late husband Greg. Gail did not believe Monica's explanation that Greg had forced her into the affair and cut ties with Monica. Monica turned to Alan for support and agreed to marry him. Eventually Gail and Monica made amends. She was thrilled when Gail found happiness by finally agreeing to marry Lee Baldwin after months of putting him off. Monica became a close confidante to Laura who found that Monica treated her like an adult while her mother continuously treated her like a child.

After their 1978 wedding, Alan bought a mansion for Monica as a wedding present, and his family ended up re-settling in Port Charles as well. Monica adored Alan's parents, Edward (who ran the family empire, ELQ) and Lila, but his sister, Tracy, felt Monica was beneath them and caused problems every chance she got. Monica continued to be a confidante to Lesley's young daughter, Laura, and when nurse Bobbie Spencer began to harass Laura and blamed her for attacking her in the hospital book store, Monica took Laura's side, realizing the extent of her own harassment towards Lesley whom she made an effort to become friends with. However, within a year of her second marriage, Monica once again fell into Rick's arms and the two had a one-night stand. Monica was pregnant and didn't know who the father was. Tracy, who had made efforts to get to know her sister-in-law whom she respected as a physician, suspected the truth and plotted to have the unborn child declared illegitimate so her son Ned would inherit the Quartermaine estate. For many months, Monica was bedridden, and innocent student nurse Amy Vining her only companion. Monica was unaware that the gossipy Amy was totally enamored of the handsome Alan who used her as a spy to keep an eye on his wife. Monica gave birth to a son, A.J. during the middle of a winter storm with only Gail and Lesley present and screamed out that Rick was the father.

=== 1980s ===
Rick and Lesley divorced so Rick and Monica could be together. Alan was enraged by this turn of events and made several attempts to kill Rick and Monica, but was thwarted at every attempt. While both Scotty and Lee found Monica's actions repulsive, their wives Laura and Gail were more compassionate even though Laura was heartsick at seeing Lesley and her adoptive father separated. Monica managed to trick Alan into admitting on tape that he had tried to kill her and Rick and moved into Tracy's old apartment as she prepared to file for an uncontested divorce. Eventually, both Monica and Alan realized that A.J. was indeed Alan's son and not Rick's. Monica attempted to hide this fact from Rick, but Alan eventually exposed the truth that there were rare circumstances when two parents with type O blood could conceive a type B blood baby. Rick, disgusted with Monica's continued manipulations, left her and focused on the formation of the waterfront clinic. A confrontation with Lesley over the revelation of Alan Jr.'s paternity ended up with Monica viciously maligning Lesley's lack of passion and Lesley's surprising response of a hard slap across Monica's face. The next day when Monica went to get her final divorce decree, she discovered that Alan had contested it, and when she confronted him, he threatened her with the loss of her son for her actions, forcing her to return to him even though she couldn't stand the sight of him. Eventually, because of issues concerning Laura on the run, Rick went back to Lesley, having Monica removed as his assistant in surgery, although he later relented, citing their shared excellence in the operating room. Monica felt that she had no other alternative but to stay with Alan, biding her time to find a way out. The only good thing that happened for Monica around this time was Tracy's departure after discovering that her husband Mitch Williams was having an affair with sexy waitress Susan Moore who ended up being manager of the Campus Disco which Alan bought as a side investment after owner Frank Smith was sent to prison for mob activities.

Following their 'reconciliation', Monica refused to sleep with Alan and insisted on separate rooms. Despite attempts by both to be civil to each other, Alan grew frustrated and in 1981, he embarked on an affair with Susan, who became pregnant and would give birth to Alan's son, Jason while out of town. Alan moved Susan into a cottage but continued to live in the Quartermaine mansion until the tensions became so great between him and Monica that he moved in with Susan. The only calm moments between Alan and Monica was their shared desire to prove that Alan's cousin, Alexandria Quartermaine was utilizing the family fortune in ways that would not keep their holdings strong. Monica was greatly amused when Alexandria's will left all of her ELQ stock to Lila, putting her in control and keeping Edward from making deals he felt important to gain more money and power. Monica hired private investigator Larry Corrigan (Frank Ashmore) to get proof of Alan's affair with Susan, and he took a job at the campus disco, managing it after Susan went to New York to have her baby. Between Larry and Cathy Summers (A.J.'s nanny), she got the evidence she needed and used it to make Alan's life a living hell. In spite of public scenes at the hospital which caused both of them to be reprimanded by Steve Hardy, Monica would continue to be seen with Alan at social functions, including Luke and Laura's wedding, even though she was preparing to file for divorce and sell the Quartermaine house, a move that Alan put a stop to. But the chemistry between Alan and Susan soon waned and he found himself becoming bored with her which lead to him unable to make love. Arguing with Monica over Susan and Jason led to them admitting their passion for one another, and Alan broke off with Susan who sued him for palimony and major child support. The final straw for Alan came when she turned into a drunk and married Scott Baldwin after being in a horrendous car accident. In 1983, Susan was murdered by Lila's first husband, Crane Tolliver (discovered after all of the Quartermaines, including Monica, were questioned as suspects), and Susan's aunt Alice Grant took Jason in. After Alice died of an embolism a few months later, Monica and Alan fought her daughter, Heather (the same Heather whom Jeff had cheated on Monica with seven years earlier) for custody of the baby. Monica was not pleased at having her husband's illegitimate offspring in the house at first, but eventually grew to love Jason as if he were her own. She later legally adopted him as well.

Monica was saddened by the sudden death in a car accident of her old rival Lesley Webber whom she had somewhat made peace with. Only a few months before, the Quartermaines had shared in the Webber family's joy over Laura Spencer's return from the dead. While determined to make her marriage to Alan work this time around, Monica did become a source of comfort for her ex-lover, Rick, and even wished him much happiness when he married Ginny Blake, the natural mother of Rick and Lesley's adopted son, Mikey. The Quartermaines had more than their share of tensions on their hand when Edward's illegitimate son Jimmy Lee Holt showed up and ended up with proof that Edward and Lila's marriage had not been legal. The following year, Jimmy Lee's mother, Beatrice LaSeur, showed up and proceeded to attempt to blackmail the family, leading to her apparent murder in which Monica was once again a suspect. But she had accidentally drank Lila's heart medication which caused her death. One of the suspects in Beatrice's death was spa owner Lorena Sharpe who turned out to be Monica's long-lost cousin. In 1986, Monica had an affair with Sean Donely, and kicked all the Quartermaines out of the mansion. Alan concocted a bizarre scheme to frame Sean for his 'murder' and even went missing for several months as part of the plan. Eventually, Sean left Monica for Tiffany Hill, and Monica reluctantly reconciled with Alan and let the Quartermaines back into the mansion.

Monica went away to a spa resort and ended up sleeping with one of the workers there, a young man named Ward. To Monica's surprise, Ward turned out to be Ned Ashton, the son of her sister-in-law, Tracy Quartermaine (who came back after a decade's absence) and thus, Alan's nephew. The two agreed to keep the affair a secret, but soon another secret of Monica's would come out. Monica's secret daughter, Dawn Winthrop turned up and began dating Ned. These two secrets proved at last to be the deathblow to Monica and Alan's marriage and the two divorced. Alan later married Lucy Coe in 1990. During this time, the family believed that Edward had been killed in a helicopter crash and fought brutally over his estate.

=== 1990s ===
Dawn was later murdered and Monica was devastated by her death. After Alan's marriage to Lucy also proved a disaster, Monica and Alan were drawn back together by their son A.J's rebellious behavior. In 1991, the two remarried and the next three years of their marriage were relatively calm, although the return of David Langton (Dawn's father), A.J.'s relationship with David's daughter Nikki and Alan's friendship with Rhonda Wexler did give the couple some cause for concern. It was during this time that Edward was found alive and returned to Port Charles to help the Quartermaine's take on the cartel who had tried to take over ELQ. Alan and Monica also welcomed Lee and Gail Baldwin back to Port Charles, getting Gail to provide some therapy for the problematic A.J. Monica supported Alan fully when he confessed to her that he had discovered that Ray Conway, Rhonda's boyfriend, had sexually molested Karen, and had pushed him after finding Ray beating up Rhonda, causing Ray to hit his head and die.

Monica's life was changed forever when she was diagnosed with breast cancer in 1994. Monica became despondent and began pushing Alan away, though Alan fought hard to give Monica the support she needed. During this time, Monica befriended Paige Bowen, a fellow cancer patient. Monica was devastated when Paige died, but ended up adopting Paige's daughter, Emily. Finally, Monica went into remission, but she and Alan were drifting further and further apart.

By 1995, A.J.'s alcoholism, which had been developing for several years, culminated in family tragedy when he and Jason were in a serious car accident. A.J. escaped relatively unhurt, but Jason was left with amnesia and brain damage. The family's attempts to make Jason remember alienated him from the family and he eventually rejected all of them including Monica in favor of working for local mob boss, Sonny Corinthos. As a result of all the tragedy in her life, Monica separated from Alan and longed to make herself feel better. Monica embarked on an affair with Dr. Pierce Dorman, which predictably ended in disaster when Dorman made false allegations of sexual harassment against Monica. In court, Dorman's lawyers brought up Monica's past indiscretions, including her affair with Ned and ended up winning the case. Monica was fired from General Hospital as a result. Monica also had to deal with both A.J.'s alcoholism and Emily's drug addiction. Monica snapped and kidnapped Dorman, and threatened to give him a lobotomy. Only Jason's intervention stopped her from doing so. Eventually though, Monica was vindicated when Dorman was murdered and revealed to have been a drug dealer. Monica and the rest of the Quartermaines were both shocked and delighted when it was revealed that the presumably deceased Lesley Webber was very much alive. When Monica went to visit her old rival, the mentally fragile Lesley calmly said she could never ever forget Monica. The two women would socialize at hospital events even though Lesley did not return to the medical profession, but on occasion, their pasts would create some comic tension.

More family drama ensued in 1998 when Carly Roberts claimed that her son Michael was Jason's. Monica's father-in-law, Edward Quartermaine, wanted to gain custody of Michael and thus Jason, who had been growing close to the Quartermaines was alienated from the family once again. Eventually, it was revealed that Jason was covering for Carly and that Michael was not Jason's son, but rather A.J.'s. During this time, Alan had become addicted to painkillers, which caused another brief estrangement between Alan and Monica.

=== 2000s ===
Alan and Monica eventually reconciled and briefly considered trying for another baby. In 2001, they decided to renew their vows only for Skye Chandler to turn up and claim that she was Alan's daughter. While Monica and Skye clashed at first, they eventually established a cordial relationship and Monica even allowed Skye to stay at the mansion after Tracy revealed she wasn't Alan's daughter after all. Alan and Monica stayed stable for several years, even as drama occurred amongst their children. A.J. lost custody of Michael to Carly and her new husband Sonny Corinthos, while Emily was temporarily paralyzed in an accident and later diagnosed with breast cancer. When Rick Webber returned to town for Laura's remarriage to Luke, he re-kindled his old friendship with Monica which caused Alan to become jealous of them once again and brought back some bad memories for Lesley Webber who had never stopped loving him. When Rick was suddenly killed, Alan and Monica were both mentioned as suspects, and for a long time, everybody believed that Laura had killed him in self-defense. The real killer was eventually revealed to be Scotty Baldwin.

In 2005, A.J. faked his death as part of a complicated plot to frame his ex-wife, Courtney Matthews, for murder and eventually kidnap his son Michael. Alan and Monica blamed each other for failing to show A.J. enough love and attention and once again a rift began in their marriage. When A.J. turned up alive and was subsequently murdered, Alan and Monica separated. Monica also believed that she had witnessed Michael kill A.J. and helped in the cover up, though eventually it was revealed that her grandson was not to blame. Monica and Alan eventually patched up their differences and decided to remain married.

As of 2006, Monica spends most of her time at the hospital, or being amused by the various dramas that have been occurring in her family. In February 2007, she was devastated by the death of her husband Alan, followed in November 2007 by the death of Emily after district attorney and Sonny's half-brother Ric Lansing tightened security at the Metro Court Hotel. Monica blamed Jason for Emily's death. Even though he was her only child left, she would not have anything to do with him, and turned to alcohol. Her drinking led to her being sued for medical malpractice by her sister-in-law Tracy Quartermaine after a botched surgery that Monica performed on Tracy's husband Luke Spencer. Monica also drank while driving, and hit Sam McCall in a hit and run. She continued to blame Jason both for her grief and her drinking problem because his job had cost her Alan, A.J. and Emily.

Monica's drinking landed her in a horrific car accident; Jason insisted that she seek treatment otherwise he would report her to the police. Monica chose to get help and report herself. Monica would reconcile with Jason, apologize for the way she had treated him and reassure him that regardless of his parentage, she thought of him as her son and she loves him. Jason would promise help her in future, be a better son, and hire his lawyer Diane Miller to defend Monica. She pleaded guilty to Sam's hit and run and driving while under the influence. Though a deal was made to have Monica attend rehab and do six months of community service, the judge insists that Monica deserves a more severe punishment, stating that Monica's grief did not give her an excuse to endanger people's lives and that she should have sought help for her condition sooner. However, Nikolas and Sam's testimonies convinced the judge to accept Monica's plea bargain.

Monica resumed her position as chief of staff at General Hospital after completing rehab. While assisting in a patient's operation, Monica, along with the rest of the operation room's surgical staff, was infected with an airborne toxin that was inside the patient. She was taken to the ICU at Mercy, but was quickly released. Monica immediately took to newcomer Rebecca Shaw, Emily's twin sister, and shared with Rebecca her own breast cancer struggle.

Monica once again became a key player in the reconstruction efforts for General Hospital to re-open after the toxin outbreak. She later stepped down from her role as chief of staff, contacting former physician Dr. Steven Webber to take over for her so that she could re-focus on her specialty of cardiology.

=== 2010s ===
Early in the decade, Monica was seen infrequently, often not present from Quartermaine family events because it is too painful for her after Alan's death. After Elizabeth Webber's son, Jake Webber, died in a hit-and-run, Monica found out that he was actually Jason's son. She was heartbroken over Jake's death, and admonished both Jason and Elizabeth for denying her the right to know her grandson. She also yelled at Luke, the driver who accidentally hit Jake. After Jason is admitted to the hospital following a car accident, Monica finds out that he & Sam are engaged. She imagines a life where Jason never got in the car with A.J., and was still Jason Quartermaine. She's later glad to still have Jason as he is. When Jason eventually woke up, she helped him and Sam plan their wedding. She gave Alan's wedding ring to Sam, who in turn gave it to Jason on their wedding day. Monica eventually returns to her job as Chief of Staff at the hospital.

Monica is thrilled when Jason and Sam have a son, Daniel Morgan, and ask her to be part of her grandson's life. Sadly, Jason disappears, and is presumed dead shortly after, and Monica had to deal with losing another child. At the same time, A.J. returns, and it's revealed that Monica helped him fake his death and sneak out of the country to avoid the criminal charges. A.J. comes back, wanting to reconnect with his family, especially Michael. Monica supported him, despite others saying he was going to cause trouble. However, he did reconnect with Michael and, in turn, Monica. When A.J. was accused of murdering Connie Falconeri and lapsed back into alcoholism, Monica got fired as chief of staff trying to support A.J. She lost her son again when A.J. was murdered by Sonny. Monica was furious, but happy when Michael disowned Sonny and started to bond more with the Quartermaines because of Sonny being like Cesar Faison.

Monica found out that Jake was actually alive, having been held captive by Helena Cassadine, and got a chance to be a part of Jake's life. She also bonded with "Jake Doe," an amnesiac patient who had a facial reconstruction surgery after an accident. It later turned out that "Jake Doe" was actually Jason, though he had no memories of his past. Monica promised not to make the same mistakes with Jason that she made before, and was able to reconnect with him. Meanwhile, Monica had to deal with the new chief of staff, Liesl Obrecht, and her strict conduct rules. Tracy, though, helped Monica get back the job after Monica called in Dr. Hamilton Finn to help an ailing Tracy. She fought to help Finn stay on staff, despite Liesl's objections. Jason, meanwhile, recovered his memories, and apologized to Monica for pushing her away for many years. He promised to make more of an effort to include her as his mother; Monica assured Jason that she loved him.

Monica was targeted by the General Hospital serial killer, later revealed to be Paul Hornsby who is like Valentin and Victor Cassadine. She was attacked and left unconscious, but was saved by Nurse Sabrina Santiago. Unfortunately, Sabrina figured out Paul was the culprit, and he killed her to keep her silent. Monica survived, but she and Tracy were forced to shut down General Hospital to prevent anyone else from getting killed. When Paul was caught and sent to prison, she and Tracy both feverishly worked to get the hospital opened up again. They succeeded, but were facing financial trouble trying to keep the hospital open. Monica and the Quartermaines rallied together, and decided to buy out the hospital so that it wouldn't be sold to develop condominiums. With Finn's help, they succeeded in stopping the Jeromes in their tracks. Monica was there when Jason and Sam decided to name their newborn daughter Emily, in honor of Monica's daughter. She was thrilled by the tribute, and met her granddaughter after Olivia Jerome was sent to a mental asylum when Judge Horace Sanchez found out Liv was unfit to stand trial.

In January 2019, Monica learned from Scotty that the widowed Gail Baldwin had died. Along with Lucy, Monica and Scotty shared memories of Gail whom Monica believed had help guide her through many situations. The following April, Monica was reunited with old colleague Lesley Webber who showed up to visit Laura and pay her respects to Gail, and after trading barbs about the past, Monica and Lesley joined the rest of the hospital staff in tossing confetti that Gail had sent as a tribute for the hospital's anniversary party and to remind old friends of the good times they had shared. Monica welcomed sister-in-law Tracy back for a visit the following Christmas and dealt with Tracy's distaste for her redecorating.

=== 2020s ===
In August 2020, Monica sees Cyrus Renault for the first time. She refuses his agreement to cooperate. In 2021 when Sonny is missing and thought of as dead, Jason marries Carly with Monica present. In April 2025, the Dr. Monica Quartermaine Cardiac Care Center was inaugurated at the hospital. The money to build the atrium center was anonymously funded by Sonny Corinthos. Due to her deteriorating health, Monica cannot attend the ceremony opening the new atrium. In September 2025, Tracy asks Jason to tell her of Drew's shooting only for him to find that she had died in her sleep.

== Reception ==
In 2023, Charlie Mason from Soaps She Knows placed Monica at 21st on his ranked list of General Hospital’s 40+ Greatest Characters of All Time, commenting "She's now arguably Port Charles' most respected surgeon. But to us, Alan's widow will always be the impetuous strumpet who drove the Webber brothers to distraction and accidentally had a fling with her own nephew."
