= Jacklyn Zeman =

American actress (1953–2023)

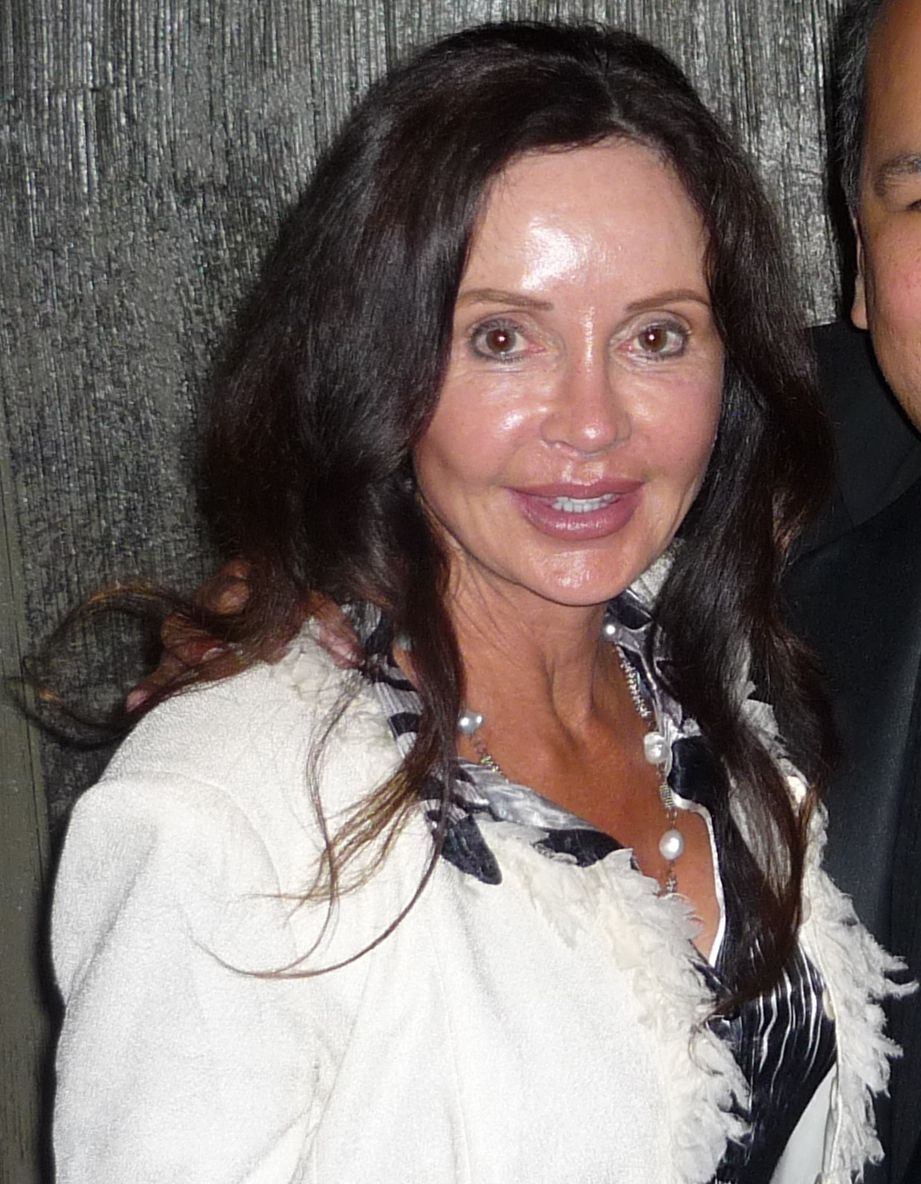
- Zeman in 2010
- Born: Jacklyn Lee Zeman; March 6, 1953; Englewood, New Jersey, U.S.
- Died: May 9, 2023 (aged 70); Thousand Oaks, California, U.S.
- Education: New York University
- Occupation: Actress
- Years active: 1973–2023
- Children: 2

Jacklyn Lee Zeman (March 6, 1953 – May 9, 2023) was an American actress who portrayed Bobbie Spencer on the ABC daytime soap opera General Hospital for 45 years.

== Early life and education ==
Zeman was born in Englewood, New Jersey, to a family of Jewish descent. Her parents are Rita Zeman-Rohlman, a magazine supervisor, and Richard S. Zeman, a systems engineer. She grew up in Bergenfield, New Jersey, and completed her high school studies at age 15, at Bergenfield High School, after which she studied dance on a scholarship at New York University. She was a Playboy Bunny at the Playboy Club in 1972.

== Career ==
Zeman had several small parts before landing a regular role in the ABC daytime soap opera One Life to Live playing Lana McClain from 1976 to 1977. Later that year, she was cast as Bobbie Spencer on the sister-soap General Hospital, a role she played on a regular basis until 2010. Zeman received three Daytime Emmy Award for Outstanding Supporting Actress in a Drama Series nominations and one Daytime Emmy Award for Outstanding Lead Actress in a Drama Series nomination for her role. Since 2013, Zeman appeared on General Hospital on a recurring basis. ABC Broadcasting Network paid respect and homage to Zeman, whose character Bobbie Spencer was also killed off on the show. The soap "killed off" Zeman's character in 2023, and honored both the character and actress during the week of January 10, 2024 when they aired Bobbie's funeral and memorial service.

Outside soap operas, Zeman appeared in the 1982 comedy film National Lampoon's Class Reunion and had a cameo in the spoof comedy film Young Doctors in Love. She starred in the made-for-television movies Jury Duty: The Comedy (1990) opposite Heather Locklear and Montana Crossroads (1993) opposite Kellie Martin. She performed in off-Broadway and other productions including Come Blow Your Horn, Barefoot in the Park, and The Boy Friend. Zeman received another Daytime Emmy Award nomination for her regular role as Sofia Madison in the streaming series The Bay in 2021.

== Personal life ==
Zeman was married three times and had two daughters, Cassidy and Lacey, from third husband Glenn Gorden. Her first husband was Murray Kaufman, known professionally as Murray the K, a DJ. Her second husband was Steve Gribbin.

Zeman was a close friend of GH co-star Shell Kepler (nurse Amy Vining). Zeman delivered a eulogy at Kepler's funeral.

Zeman was also close to GH co-star Anna Lee (wealthy matriarch Lila Quartermaine), to whom Zeman paid tribute in 2004, prior to Lee's death. She stated that Lee had been like a "surrogate grandmother" to her, both on and off the camera: "I have great respect and admiration for Anna Lee personally and professionally. She was always a pleasure to spend time with both on and off the set. I still think of her often and I feel blessed to have experienced her friendship and her amazing sense of humor. I miss her beautiful smiling face."

Zeman died at Los Robles Hospital & Medical Center in Thousand Oaks, California, on May 9, 2023, at age 70, after a short battle with cancer.

== Filmography ==
Year	Title	Role	Notes
1976	The Edge of Night	Bobbi	1 episode
1977	The Day the Music Died	Samantha	
1976–1977	One Life to Live	Lana McClain	Series regular
1977–2010, 2013–2023	General Hospital	Bobbie Spencer	Series regular Nominated—Daytime Emmy Award for Outstanding Lead Actress in a Drama Series (1998); Nominated—Daytime Emmy Award for Outstanding Supporting Actress in a Drama Series (1981, 1995, 1997)
1982	Young Doctors in Love	Cameo	
1982	National Lampoon's Class Reunion	Jane Washbur	
1987	Mike Hammer	Amy Miller	Episode: "Kill John Doe"
1987	Sledge Hammer!	Brianne O'Brian	Episode: "The Color of Hammer"
1990	Jury Duty: The Comedy	Samantha	Television film
1993	Montana Crossroads	Julia Morrow Wheeler	Television film
1994	Chicago Hope	Soap Nurse	Episode: "Death Be Proud"
2005	The Mission	Kathryn	Short film
2009	Deep in the Valley	Sonja Monia	
2010–2023	The Bay	Sofia Madison	Series regular Nominated—Daytime Emmy Award for Outstanding Supporting Actress in a Daytime Fiction Program (2021); Nominated—Indie Series Award for Best Supporting Actress—Drama (2022)
2017–2019	Misguided	Mo	7 episodes Nominated—Indie Series Award for Best Supporting Actress—Comedy (2018); Nominated—Indie Series Award for Best Supporting Actress—Drama (2020)
