= Young Doctors in Love =

1982 film by Garry Marshall

- Theatrical release poster
- Directed by: Garry Marshall
- Written by: Michael Elias; Rich Eustis
- Produced by: Jerry Bruckheimer
- Starring: Michael McKean; Sean Young; Hector Elizondo; Harry Dean Stanton; Patrick Macnee; Dabney Coleman
- Cinematography: Donald Peterman
- Edited by: Dov Hoenig
- Music by: Maurice Jarre
- Production company: ABC Motion Pictures
- Distributed by: 20th Century-Fox
- Release date: July 16, 1982
- Running time: 96 minutes
- Country: United States
- Language: English
- Budget: $7,020,000
- Box office: $30,688,860

Young Doctors in Love is a 1982 American comedy film directed by Garry Marshall. It spoofs a variety of medical shows (in particular, General Hospital) and has many guest stars from ABC soap operas.

The film stars Sean Young, Michael McKean, Harry Dean Stanton, Dabney Coleman and Patrick Macnee. It also features Demi Moore in one of her early film roles.

== Plot ==
A group of eight young medical interns join the City Hospital surgery staff run by Dr. Prang, a brash and cynical surgeon leading an expensive and dissolute lifestyle.

Meanwhile, old mafioso Sal Bonafetti is admitted to the same hospital under an assumed name after suffering a stroke; his son Angelo disguises himself as a woman or 'Angela' in order to watch over Sal, fearing retaliation by rival crime syndicates.

Professional hitman Malamud is admitted to a bed next to Sal's in order to assassinate him, but his every attempt fails, causing Malamud himself to undergo painful and unnecessary treatment.

The resident who regularly checks in with Sal and Angela is Dr. Walter Rist. Over time he seems to develop feelings for "her", not knowing it's Sal's son in disguise.

Residents Dr. Stephanie Brody and Dr. Simon August develop a relationship as the film progresses. Out to dinner, she has a strong pain in her side, but shakes it off, insisting it's nothing.

As Dr. Phil Burns is working two other jobs to afford the residency, he's half-asleep when a dirty note is passed to him by head Nurse Norine Sprockett. Taken from a patient, Phil mistakens it as a come on. When he makes a pass at her, Norine slaps him. As a way of apologizing, he shows her the fox step, as his second job is as a dance instructor. Phil discovers Norine wears the key to the medications cabinet around her neck when he convinces her to get him an upper.

Dr. Prang schedules Simon for a basic surgery, but Simon panics when he's assigned an appendectomy. He has a flashback to a joke played on him with a piñata on his birthday. Stephanie has sex with Simon on the operating table to cure him of his panic of the room.

Months pass, Sal continues to thwart Malamud's assassination attempts. At the hospital Christmas party, Stephanie and Simon announce their engagement and she collapses shortly afterwards. It's discovered that she is afflicted with a condition requiring a labor-intensive procedure. Simon forces a reluctant Dr. Prang to go ahead with the operation. Because it's complicated, the surgeons practise on a dummy.

In the meantime Phil, who illegally sells drugs stolen from the hospital, is arrested by the police after Norine discovers his scheme.

Stephanie's operation is scheduled, but at the last minute both the nurses go on strike and Dr. Prang becomes distraught when his accountant tells him that he has to declare bankruptcy. Simon must operate without him, using his fellow residents as support.

After some scares, the operation is ultimately a success.

== Cast ==
- Sean Young as Dr. Stephanie Brody
- Michael McKean as Dr. Simon August
- Gary Friedkin as Dr. Milton Chamberlain
- Kyle T. Heffner as Dr. Charles Litto
- Rick Overton as Dr. Flicker
- Crystal Bernard as Julie
- Ted McGinley as Dr. DeVol
- Saul Rubinek as Kurtzman
- Harry Dean Stanton as Dr. Ludwig
- Hector Elizondo as Angelo
- Pamela Reed as Nurse Sprockett
- Dabney Coleman as Dr. Prang
- Michael Richards as Malamud Callahan
- Taylor Negron as Dr. Phil Burns
- Titos Vandis as Sal Bonafetti
- Patrick Collins as Dr. Walter Rist
- Patrick Macnee as Jacobs
- Haunani Minn as Nurse Chang
- Lynne Marie Stewart as Nurse Thatcher
- Richard Dean Anderson as the drug dealer (uncredited)

Soap actors John Beradino, Emily McLaughlin, Michael Damian, Steven Ford, Chris Robinson, Stuart Damon, Jaime Lyn Bauer, Tom Ligon, Kin Shriner, Janine Turner, and Jacklyn Zeman make cameos, while Susan Lucci, Cynthia Geary, Patrick Macnee and Demi Moore appear in uncredited cameos.

== Reception ==
The film was a moderate box office success with gross receipts over $30 million.

The New York Times offered a positive review, which wrote that "there are enough bright moments to make this a passable hot-weather entertainment." Roger Ebert of The Chicago Sun-Times gave the film a mixed 2 stars out of a possible 4, saying it had some good moments (particularly scenes with Stanton or Coleman), but on the whole “is not very funny” because TV soap operas are already so exaggerated they’re difficult to satirize.

Young Doctors in Love maintains a 35% "rotten" rating on Rotten Tomatoes based on 17 reviews.
