= List of General Hospital characters introduced in the 1970s =

General Hospital is the longest running American television serial drama, airing on ABC. Created by Frank and Doris Hursley, who originally set it in a general hospital (hence the title), in an unnamed fictional city. In the 1970s, the city was named Port Charles, New York. The series premiered on April 1, 1963. This is a list of notable characters who significantly impacted storylines and began their run, or significantly returned, from the years 1970 to 1979.

== Ruby Anderson ==
Ruby Anderson
- General Hospital character
- Portrayed by: Norma Connolly
- Duration: 1979–98
- First appearance: August 1979
- Last appearance: December 4, 1998
- Created by: Douglas Marland
- Introduced by: Gloria Monty
- Book appearances: Robin's Diary
In-universe information
- Occupation: Owner of Kelly's Diner; Formerly on staff at General Hospital; Former Prostitute
- Family: Spencer
- Brothers: Tim Spencer
- Nieces and nephews: Pat Spencer; Luke Spencer; Bobbie Spencer

Ruby Anderson (maiden name Spencer) is a fictional character on the popular ABC soap opera, General Hospital. She was played by actress Norma Connolly, from the character's origin in 1979 until Connolly's death in 1998, when the character was subsequently killed off. Connolly was nominated for the Daytime Emmy Award for Outstanding Supporting Actress in a Drama Series in 1985.

=== Storylines ===
In August 1979, Ruby Anderson arrives in Port Charles. Ruby has become too old to prostitute anymore so she comes to see her niece and nephew, Luke and Bobbie Spencer. Ruby befriends Nurse Jessie Brewer who helps her get a job at General Hospital. Ruby began dating Dan Rooney, a General Hospital administrator who had earlier been turned down by Jessie when he asked her to marry him. Hiding her feelings for months, Jessie finally was able to tell Ruby that she had been jealous of her and Dan, even though she thought she had moved on from him. Ruby had no qualms about Dan and Jessie attending social events together when she was unavailable. During the time that Luke and Laura were on the run from mobster Frank Smith, Ruby was beaten up by his goons, but recovered.

Early in 1982, Ruby underwent surgery for stomach pains, with Dr. Arthur Bradshaw freezing during the surgery and Dr. Noah Drake taking over. This caused concerned nurse Annie Logan to investigate Bradshaw's practices, and although Ruby was grateful to Dr. Bradshaw, Anne proved that he was becoming negligent in surgery because of exhaustion. Ruby recovered, and was present on Luke's yacht, the Haunted Star, when federal agents began a shootout with cult members involved with David Gray over an attempt to steal artifacts in order to take over the fictional country of Malkuth. Armed with bottles and other restaurant devices, Ruby and the other guests helped the fed's knock these characters out, sending them to prison. Shortly after this, Ruby joined forces with Robert Scorpio to stop waterfront criminal George Durnley who was trying to force Ruby and other tenants out of their building to build a mall down by the Port Charles docks.

Ruby eventually becomes the owner of Kelly's Diner after her friend Rose Kelly moved away. In 1983, after finding out that Scott Baldwin was threatening to expose Bobbie's past as a former prostitute in order to keep Luke from being elected Mayor of Port Charles, Ruby pays a visit to Scotty's father, Lee Baldwin. Ruby tells Lee of Scott's threats, resulting in Lee firing Scott from his legal practice. In 1987, Dan proposes to Ruby, and she promises to think about it. He is briefly distracted by the flirtatious Charlene Simpson, Lucy Coe's aunt, but admits he only has eyes for Ruby. She gently turns him down, explaining that their pasts are too different, but she will always be honored by his desire to marry her.

In early 1991, Bobbie comes across a patient she is sure is Luke, but Ruby immediately recognizes the man as Bill Eckert, Luke's cousin from the other side of the family whom they have been estranged with for years. During his 2 1/2 years in town, Bill and Ruby are very antagonistic to each other. Ruby meets young Jagger Cates in 1992 when Jagger and his friends break into Kelly's Diner. During the robbery, Ruby is assaulted and Jagger is shot by the police while trying to escape. Ruby forgives Jagger for his role in the incident, and gives him a room above Kelly's and a job. The following year, Lucky Spencer pays a visit on Ruby after Luke and Laura's truck is bombed at their Canadian restaurant. Luke and Laura soon follow, reunited with both Ruby and Bobbie. Bill Eckert is killed soon afterwards, being mistaken by Frank Smith's men for being Luke. In 1997, Ruby meets Elizabeth Webber. Liz asks for a beer without identification. Suspecting the teen was underage, Ruby serves her a root beer instead. Eventually Ruby warms to Elizabeth and gives her a job at Kelly's. In 1999, Ruby dies in her sleep, leaving Kelly's to her niece and nephew, Luke and Bobbie.

== Gail Baldwin ==
Gail Baldwin
- General Hospital character
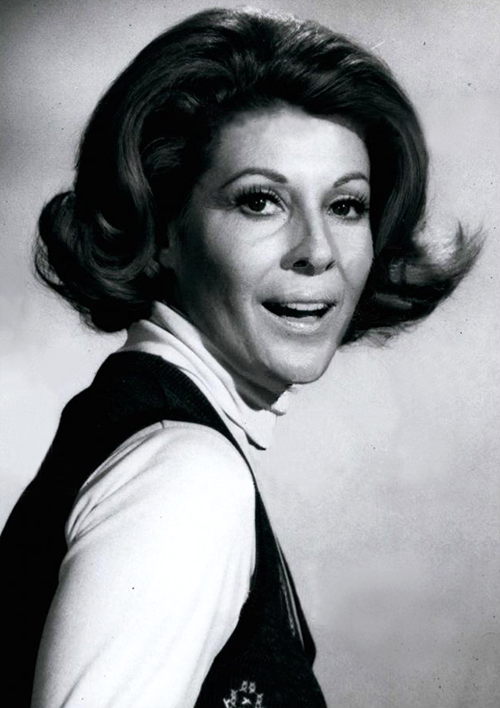
- Portrayed by: Susan Brown
- Duration: 1977–85; 1989–90; 1992–2002; 2004
- First appearance: February 1977
- Last appearance: July 16, 2004
- Created by: Eileen Pollock and Robert Mason Pollock
- Introduced by: Tom Donovan (1977); H. Wesley Kenney (1989); Wendy Riche (1992)
- Spin-off appearances: Port Charles
In-universe information
- Occupation: Psychiatrist
- Spouse: Greg Adamson; Lee Baldwin (1979–2017)
- Children: Monica Quartermaine (foster)
- Stepchildren: Scott Baldwin
- Grandchildren: Robert Frank (step); Karen Wexler (step); Serena Baldwin (step); Christina Baldwin (step); Logan Hayes (step)

Dr. Gail Baldwin (previously Adamson) is a fictional character on the popular ABC daytime drama, General Hospital. Susan Brown originated the role in 1977.

=== Casting ===
In 1979 Brown was nominated for a Daytime Emmy Award for Outstanding Supporting Actress. Brown left the series on December 12, 1985, and made brief guest appearances on February 21 to March 2, 1989, June 29 to August 9, 1989, October 24 to November 9, 1989, and from July 10, 1990, to late 1990, before returning on September 30, 1992, on a recurring status. Gail is last seen in 2004 at the funeral of Lila Quartermaine.

=== Storylines ===
==== General Hospital ====
Dr. Gail Adamson comes to Port Charles in February 1977 as a psychiatrist, and it is revealed she had previously been a foster mother to Monica Quartermaine. Gail meets Lee Baldwin when they are both mourning the deaths of their spouses. Lee Baldwin had been married to Caroline Chandler Baldwin when Caroline was lost at sea with her son. Gail contacts Lee's adoptive son, Scott Baldwin, who then comes to Port Charles, gets a job as a clerk at General Hospital, and falls in love with Laura Webber. Gail and Monica's close relationship was threatened briefly when a jealous patient who knew them in the past revealed that Monica had been seduced by Gail's late husband, Greg. Upset at first by this, she eventually forgave Monica. Gail gives Monica advice about her love life when she is torn between Alan Quartermaine and Rick Webber. Along with Lesley Webber, Gail also helps Monica deliver her son A. J. Quartermaine during a snowstorm and is shocked when Monica announces that A.J. was fathered by Lesley's husband, Rick. Alan is later revealed to be A.J.'s biological father.

Gail and Lee marry in 1979 and are very involved with Scott and Laura's life. When Laura wants to divorce Scott after falling in love with Luke Spencer, Lee burns the divorce papers but later admits what he did. The only issues in Lee and Gail's marriage was her devotion to Monica, whom Lee felt had deliberately tried to break up Rick and Lesley's marriage. Lee and Gail were present at Luke and Laura's wedding when Scotty appeared and announced he was contesting the divorce. Gail remains a strong force in Lee's struggle with remaining sober and a confidante to many hospital staff members. When Lee briefly went off the wagon, Gail and Bryan Phillips immediately stepped in to help Lee sober up for good. Lee and Gail's friendship with Rick and Lesley was briefly strained because of the divorce, and each of their devotion to their children, but by the time of Luke and Laura's wedding, Lee had come to forgive Laura and put the past behind him.

After Dr. Cy Katz resigned as the psychiatrist from Heather Webber's case, Gail took over, and after Scotty tried to influence her decision by indicating that Heather was unwell, Gail gave Heather a good report to the judge on her case, thus freeing her for crimes she had committed in order to escape prosecution for being indirectly involved in the death of nurse Diana Taylor. In 1983, she supports Lee in his race for Port Charles mayor, and when Luke Spencer resigns after beating Lee (thanks to Scotty's unscrupulous actions), Lee is made mayor, making Gail the town's first lady. When Lee decides not to seek re-election, they decide to spend time traveling. In early 1989, Gail meets Monica while she is away on a medical convention and gives her information as to the whereabouts of the daughter (Dawn Winthrop) Monica gave up for adoption. Unbeknownst to them, Dawn is already in Port Charles. With Lee busy having returned to work, Gail makes an extended visit to stay with the Quartermaines, helping Monica deal with the recent return of her scheming sister-in-law, Tracy. She leaves to re-join Lee, but they return for a visit the following year only to discover that Tracy and Scotty have become involved.

Lee and Gail return to Port Charles for good in 1992 and are delighted by Scotty's new relationship with the ailing Dominique Stanton. They support his decision to have Dominique's embryo transplanted into Lucy Coe when Dominique dies and later are present when Scotty prepares to marry the scheming Katherine Bell which does not go through thanks to Lucy's interference. Gail, having returned to work at General Hospital, counsels the Quartermains sons A.J. and Jason, while Lee becomes Edward's counsel once again. Lee defends Edward when he is accused of having murdered Mary Mae Ward's son Bradley whom Edward was the illegitimate father of. . They are surprised to learn they are grandparents when it is revealed in 1993 that Scott fathered high school graduate Karen Wexler with his secretary Rhonda Wexler when he was a law student. When Monica is diagnosed with breast cancer, Gail and Bobbie are among her staunchest supporters, tolerating her emotional outbursts and providing her with a shoulder to cry on when her vulnerabilities surface. Gail is dealt another shock when old friend Lesley Webber is revealed to be alive, and after Lesley recovers from years of being in an almost catatonic state, Gail visits her at the Spencer home with longtime friend Audrey Hardy.

In 2004, after Lila Quartermaine dies in her sleep, Gail and Lee come back to attend the funeral. In May 2013, Scott opted not to invite Lee, Gail, & Serena to his & Laura's wedding, but rather keep it small and intimate. Gail is mentioned by Monica as having visited her with Lesley and Audrey. Lee dies in 2017 in Florida where he and Gail have retired. Gail passes away peacefully two years later and leaves General Hospital a bequest.

==== Port Charles ====
Lee and Gail are thrilled in 1997 when Scotty and Serena come back to town along with granddaughter Karen Wexler. Lee defends Julie Devlin when she is accused of being the General Homicide serial killer, and puts the blame on Eve Lambert. Julie is acquitted, but a tape surfaces that proves Julie was the real killer. When Julie is caught, Lee becomes her legal guardian, and Gail tries every attempt to get her committed to Ferncliff. Lee suffers a pulmonary embolism in 1999, but survives and makes a recovery. When Laura and Scotty reconcile in 2001, Lee and Gail support their decision, but after dealing with near death at the hands of a returned from the dead Stavros Cassadine, Laura ends their relationship, returning once again to Luke. In 2003, Karen is struck and killed by a speeding car. With some coercion on Gail's part, Scott allows Karen's blood to be donated to save Lucy. They fade into the background, presumably leaving town once again.

== Tom Hardy ==
Tom Hardy
- General Hospital character
- Portrayed by: Christine Cahill (1971–74); David Comfort (1977–81); Bradley Green (1981–82); David Walker (1982–84); David Wallace (1987–93); Matthew Ashford (1995–97)
- Duration: 1971–74; 1977–84; 1987–93; 1995–97
- First appearance: February 17, 1971
- Last appearance: May 5, 1997
- Introduced by: James Young (1971); Wendy Riche (1995)
- Book appearances: Robin's Diary
In-universe information
- Other names: Thomas Baldwin, Jr. Thomas Steven Hardy; Steven Baldwin
- Occupation: Psychiatrist
- Family: Hardy
- Parents: Tom Baldwin; Audrey Hardy; Steve Hardy (adopted)
- Half-brothers: Jeff Webber (adoptive)
- Wife: Simone Ravelle Hardy (1988–95)
- Sons: Tommy Hardy
- Uncles: Lee Baldwin
- Aunts: Lucille Weeks; Edith Logan
- Nephews: Steve Webber (adoptive)
- Nieces: Sarah Webber (adoptive); Elizabeth Webber (adoptive); Hayden Barnes (adoptive)
- First cousins: Scott Baldwin (adoptive); Anne Logan

Tom Hardy is a fictional character on the ABC Daytime soap opera, General Hospital. He is the son of Audrey March Hardy (Rachel Ames) and Tom Baldwin Sr., adopted by Audrey's husband Steve Hardy. The series first cast Ames' real-life daughter, Christine Cahill, to play Tom as a baby.

Audrey March fell in love and married Steve Hardy, and later divorced him when she was grieving after suffering a miscarriage. After the divorce, she soon married Tom Baldwin in an effort to push Steve away and show him she was over him. Audrey, however, couldn't bring herself to consummate the marriage. Tom raped Audrey, and when she found out she was pregnant, she filed for divorce and left town to protect her baby from his violent father.

Audrey returned to Port Charles in 1971 and told her sister Lucille that the baby had died, which was a lie. Audrey had in fact given birth to a boy she named Steven, after her true love, Steve Hardy. Audrey kept Steve, as he was called, in hiding. She was afraid that if Tom knew the baby lived, that he would contest the divorce, which was not yet finalized. Steve was renamed Thomas Baldwin, Jr., and called Tommy, and Tom Baldwin found out he was alive. He reclaimed his son and forced Audrey to resume their marriage. Tom then kidnapped Tommy and fled to Mexico. After a while, Tom was presumed dead and Tommy was reunited with his mother.

After several years, Tom Baldwin once again resurfaced, very much alive. He tried to reclaim both his wife, to whom he was still legally married, and their son. However, after finally realizing he was not wanted, he left town and their divorce was finally finalized. Steve Hardy and Audrey finally married and Steve adopted Tommy.

In 1987, Tom Hardy returned to Port Charles after graduating medical school. He met and married Dr. Simone Ravelle, an African-American pediatrician, in 1988. Audrey was worried that their interracial marriage would not be accepted and that they would face trouble because of it. Audrey and Simone became close, however, in the years that followed.

Simone soon found herself pregnant. When a racist patient made a comment about Simone's show of affection toward Tom, he and Tom got into a scuffle. Simone tried to break it up and ended up falling to the floor, suffering a miscarriage. Simone went away with her mother for a while after the loss. While gone, she met an African-American doctor named Harrison Davis. When she returned to Port Charles, Harrison also came and got a job at General Hospital. Simone and Tom struggled to get their marriage back on track and Simone turned to Harrison, and they had sex. The next day, Tom came to Simone and they reconnected and had sex. Simone then found out she was pregnant again, but did not know whether Harrison or Tom was the father, and she had not even told Tom about her affair with Harrison.

Thomas "Tommy" Hardy, Jr. was born in 1989, but Simone still did not know who his father was. She finally confessed her affair to Tom and a DNA test was done, showing that Harrison was his father. Tom stuck by Simone, and a custody battle ensued between them and Harrison. During the custody battle, Tom brought Simone's mother to town and she confessed that she and Harrison falsified the DNA test. Her mother thought that Simone and Tommy would be better suited with Harrison, instead of Tom. This meant that Tom was in fact Tommy's father.

Tom later went to Africa to treat refugees there. He returned to Port Charles three years later and wanted to pick up with Simone and Tommy where he left off. Simone, however, had moved on and was now dating Justus Ward. After fighting with Simone and Justus for a few months, Tom finally agreed to a divorce. Tom moved on and dated Felicia Jones for a while, but that ended and Tom ultimately returned to Africa.

== Joe Kelly ==
Joe Kelly
- General Hospital character
- Portrayed by: Doug Sheehan
- Duration: 1979–82
- First appearance: 1979
- Last appearance: 1982
In-universe information
- Occupation: Lawyer; Police detective
- Parents: Paddy Kelly
- Stepparents: Rose Kelly

Joe Kelly is a fictional character from the ABC Daytime soap opera, General Hospital. Doug Sheehan portrayed the role from 1979 to 1982. Sheehan was nominated for the Daytime Emmy Award for Outstanding Supporting Actor in a Drama Series in 1982.

Joe arrives in 1979 and is the roommate of Jeff Webber. He is interested in Anne Logan but she only sees him as a close friend and begins seeing Jeff. In 1981, Joe investigates the murder of Diana Taylor. Joe and detective Burt Ramsey believe Heather Webber is guilty, but Joe is hesitant because he is attracted to Heather. Joe later dates Bobbie Spencer, but she goes back to Noah Drake. Joe's romance with Heather ends abruptly when he finds her in bed with his former close friend Scott Baldwin. In 1982, Joe is offered a position with the State Attorney's office in Albany, New York and leaves town. Later, Joe invites his stepmother Rose to join him in Albany, which she accepts.

== Susan Moore ==
Susan Moore
- General Hospital character
- Portrayed by: Gail Ramsey
- Duration: 1978–83
- First appearance: March 24, 1978
- Last appearance: February 11, 1983
- Created by: Douglas Marland
- Introduced by: Gloria Monty
In-universe information
- Other names: Susan Baldwin
- Spouse: Scott Baldwin (1982–83)
- Sons: Jason Morgan; Drew Cain
- Grandsons: Jake Webber; Danny Morgan; Oscar Nero
- Granddaughters: Scout Cain
- Aunts: Alice Grant
- First cousins: Heather Webber
- Other relatives: Steve Webber; Franco Baldwin; Esme Prince

Susan Moore is a fictional character from the ABC original daytime soap opera, General Hospital. Gail Ramsey (sometimes known as Gail Rae Carlson) originated the role on March 24, 1978. Ramsey is the real-life wife of Steve Carlson, who played Gary Lansing on the series. Ramsey departed the series on February 11, 1983, as Susan is murdered.

Susan Moore, the flirtatious cousin of Heather Webber, arrives in Port Charles in 1978 and catches the eye of Mitch Williams much to the dismay of Tracy Quartermaine. Mitch and Susan would soon begin an affair which continues when Mitch marries Tracy in 1979. In 1980, Tracy, fed up with Susan and Mitch's rendezvous, donates two million dollars to Mitch's campaign for governor in exchange for him breaking things off with Susan. Meanwhile, Susan gets involved with mob boss Frank Smith.

In 1981, Susan begins an affair with Tracy's brother, Alan Quartermaine, who is fed up with his wife Monica Quartermaine's affair with Rick Webber. In July, Susan breaks things off but shortly reveals she is pregnant. Susan then relocates to New York City and secretly gives birth in September. Alan tracks her down and convinces her to come back to Port Charles with their son, Jason. Susan gets upset by the constant pressure from Alan's father Edward Quartermaine, who wants her to disappear. A furious Alan moves out in October 1981 and moves in with Susan at her cottage. After Susan kicks Alan out because he refuses to divorce Monica, he arranges for a divorce in January 1982 and they reunite. In July, Susan is devastated when Alan postpones his divorce, reunites with Monica, and tells Susan it is over for good. Heather convinces Susan to go after the Quartermaine fortune, but a distraught Susan turns to alcohol. Eventually, Scott Baldwin steps in as Susan's lawyer. Susan is unaware of Heather and Scott's plans to get their hands on the Quartermaine money themselves. In September, Susan wins a million dollar trust fund for Jason, while Susan only receives $150,000. Susan and Scott become romantically involved, much to Heather's dismay. In December, Susan signs a document giving Heather permission to raise Jason if anything happens to her. When a drunken Susan finds Scott with Laura Templeton, she gets into a car accident and is left in critical condition. After realizing Heather will get everything if she dies, Susan convinces Scott to marry her that month. Susan falls for Scott who is only after her money. Alan is insanely jealous.

In January 1983, Scott uses Jason's trust fund for the renovation of the waterfront pier and builds a mall. Susan takes power of attorney away from Scott and kicks him out of her house. Susan is later approached by Crane Tolliver, the first husband of Lila Quartermaine, who reveals he is still legally married to Lila. Susan shocks the Quartermaines with this information but Crane is upset when she does not demand money from them. Meanwhile, Susan learns Scott forged her signature to give him back power of attorney, and she files a lawsuit against him. Susan decides to bring the Quartermaine scandal to the press, but Tolliver does not want to be charged with blackmail. In February, Susan is found shot at her home. The investigation produces numerous suspects including Scott, Monica, Heather, Edward, Lila and Heather's mother Alice Grant. Crane Tolliver is revealed to be the killer.

In September 2017, it is revealed that Susan actually gave birth to twin boys, Susan who was heavily pregnant went to New York City to stay with Heather so she could hide from Alan who was looking for her so he could take her back to Port Charles. Susan discover while having ultrasound she was carrying twins this added even more pressure on her because now should would be on the run with two babies. Heather, suggest to Susan since the Quatermaines didn't know about second baby that she should give the baby up. So Susan took Jason back to Port Charles with Alan while Heather gave the second baby to Nurse Besty Frank who did the ultrasound on Susan, who was also raising Heather's son Franco later on Besty would leave the baby at an orphanage, eventually the child was revealed to have grown into a Navy SEAL named Andrew Cain.

== Lila Quartermaine ==
Lila Quartermaine
- General Hospital character
- Portrayed by: Anna Lee (1978–2003); Meg Wyllie (1994); Juliet Grainger (2003–04); Uncredited (2012–19)
- Duration: 1978–2004; 2012; 2014; 2019
- First appearance: June 1978
- Last appearance: May 1, 2019
- Created by: Douglas Marland
- Introduced by: Gloria Monty
- Book appearances: Robin's Diary
- Spin-off appearances: Port Charles
In-universe information
- Other names: Lila Morgan; Lila Tolliver
- Occupation: Shareholder of ELQ; Creator/Founder of "Pickle-Lila"
- Family: Quartermaine
- Father: Harold Morgan
- Brothers: Hal Morgan; Kenneth Morgan
- Spouse: Crane Tolliver (194?–83); Edward Quartermaine (1945–2004) (Note: Edward and Lila's first wedding on August 6, 1945 was proven to be invalid on January 21, 1983. They remarried on March 24, 1983.)
- Sons: Alan Quartermaine
- Daughters: Tracy Quartermaine
- Stepsons: Bradley Ward; Jimmy Lee Holt
- Grandsons: Ned Quartermaine; A. J. Quartermaine; Jason Morgan; Andrew Cain; Dillon Quartermaine
- Granddaughters: Skye Quartermaine (adoptive); Emily Quartermaine (adoptive)
- First cousins: Eleanor Morgan; Herbert Morgan
- Other relatives: Brook Lynn Quartermaine; Michael Corinthos; Chloe Morgan

Lila Quartermaine is a fictional character on the ABC soap opera General Hospital. She was portrayed by Anna Lee from 1978 until Lee's death on May 14, 2004, making her last appearance on May 30, 2003. The character was written out of the show in July 2004, when she died peacefully in her sleep off-screen.

=== Casting ===
Anna Lee originated the role of Lila in June 1978. On January 7, 1993, Lee was awarded a star on the Hollywood Walk of Fame, the first actress to receive a star while on a daytime drama. On July 1, 1994, Meg Wyllie (who had previously appeared on "General Hospital" in two other roles) debuted as the temporarily recast Lila until Lee's return on September 20, 1994. In 2003, Lee was dropped to recurring status. Her last appearance was on May 30, 2003. Lee was awarded the Lifetime Achievement Award at the 2004 Daytime Emmys, but died one week prior. The role was portrayed by Juliet Grainger in flashbacks in 2003 and 2004. Uncredited actresses portrayed the role briefly in 2012, 2014 and 2019, when the character appeared as a ghost to help bring Edward, A. J. Quartermaine and Oscar Nero to heaven.

=== Storylines ===
Lila Morgan Quartermaine was born on April 29, 1918. The saintly wife of wicked billionaire Edward Quartermaine and mother to warring siblings Alan and Tracy, Lila is the matriarch of the Quartermaine family, dispensing advice and intervening in conflicts when necessary. Over the years, she is beloved by all of Port Charles, including grandson Jason Quartermaine who, stricken with permanent amnesia after a car crash and wanting to distance himself from the family, takes the name "Jason Morgan" as a tribute to her.

Edward and Lila Quartermaine were living in a Long Island mansion in 1977 when their son Alan came to Port Charles and fell in love with Dr. Monica Webber. Lila was initially presented as a rather naive society matron, but quickly showed a temperament equivalent to her ruthless husband's that would take everybody by surprise when it was necessary. Lila made her first appearance in the summer of 1978 when she visited Port Charles for their wedding and instantly adored her new daughter-in-law, warning her of Tracy's determination to keep the trust fund of her grandfather whose will indicated that any male heir with the last name of Quartermaine would be prioritized over any elder grandsons without the family name. She visited Port Charles periodically over the next year, settling in town in 1980 permanently when Edward moved the headquarters of ELQ offices there. Monica's belief that her son, Alan Jr., had been fathered by Rick Webber was proven false when Lila pointed out a birth mark on the baby that was a family trademark. Although Monica continued to pretend that Rick was the baby's father for months, Alan exposed her at a party that Lila attended, leaving Monica humiliated. Lila would forgive her daughter-in-law and prayed that they would make amends. When Lila began demanding that the family, including Alan and Monica, had dinner together once a week, it created much tension, but Lila hoped that it would eventually show them how much they really loved each other, having dealt with Edward the same way when he strayed with other women.

Lila showed her affinity for running things when she organized a hospital auction in May 1981 and dealt strongly with several obstacles at the fundraiser, including the theft of the ugly "Ice Princess" statue. The social climbing Emma Lutz who had donated the statue, became angry at Lila when her name was not put amongst the list of donors, yet attempted with no luck to win back Lila's approval when she ended up finding the statue again. Alan's affair with Susan Moore produced grandson Jason whom Lila would visit, but she never accepted Susan and unlike other residents of Port Charles, would be cool to her when she ran into her in public. Lila schemed to bring Monica and Alan together by planning their weekly family dinner and then leaving for a restaurant with Edward. During their attempts to be civil together, Alan and Monica ended up passionately kissing, and when interrupted by a returning Edward and Lila, denied anything had happened. Lila, returning from one of her regular jaunts to South Hampton, was thrilled to discover that Alan and Monica reconciled.

After the death of her niece, Alexandria, Lila inherited her ELQ shares, and often voted in ways that Edward was opposed to. When he had her sign documents she could tell were shady, Lila would often use false names (such as Mrs. Abraham Lincoln), knowing that Edward was too much in a hurry to look. Prior to this plot twist, Lila had only made periodic guest appearances, but became a regular character after this storyline began. It was during this time that Lila established a friendship with some of the not so wealthy characters of Port Charles, especially Luke Spencer, a fact that rattled her husband who didn't trust him after the whole Ice Princess crisis ended even though Luke had saved Port Charles from freezing. Lila hired Robert to locate a young man named Eric, keeping the secret from him that Eric was Edward's son from an affair with a woman named Beatrice, and Robert was only able to discover that Beatrice was allegedly deceased and that Eric had gone to private schools in Europe. Lila even became friends with Emma Lutz who took Lila to Kelly's Diner for lunch, with Lila puzzled over the fact that Kelly's didn't take reservations. Eventually, Lila returned to more of her charitable activities, leaving the running of ELQ to Edward, although she continued to make her feelings known when he did anything she considered shady or ruthless.

Edward and Lila had a scandal of their own in early 1983 when it was revealed that Lila had not legally divorced her first husband, Crane Tolliver, who through Susan Moore blackmailed the Quartermaines. Around the same time, a handsome but blue collar worker named Jimmy Lee Holt showed up and revealed himself to be the missing Eric, having been passed off by Beatrice (revealed to be very much alive) to distant relatives when she decided to float around the world with a series of wealthy lovers. After Susan was murdered, Lila was among the suspects, but the killer was revealed to be Crane whom Susan had betrayed. Edward and Lila were legally married, although the divorce papers ended up in the hands of Jimmy Lee, who held them over his head for months. The following year, Jimmy Lee's mother, Beatrice, came to town, revealing herself to be nothing like how Edward remembered her, and stirred up more trouble, trying to further blackmail the family, but after accidentally swallowing Lila's heart medication, died herself. Lila and Quartermaine housekeeper Stella Fields became successful in business when they invented a relish they called "Pickle-Lila". This saved the Quartermaines from ruin during one of ELQ's darkest hours.

When Tracy came back to town in 1989, family drama was stirred up again after Edward was believed to have been killed in a plane crash and the family battled over the estate. Lila continued to confide to Edward's talking portrait for quite a while afterwards, but Edward was revealed to be alive in 1991 and living on an island in the Pacific. This brought new battles to the Quartermaines, but Lila always remained gracious yet stern when her family misbehaved. Lila was heartbroken when Edward disowned Tracy once again for her devious ways. The following year, Edward's past affair with Mary Mae Ward was revealed, and Lila was there to support him for allegedly killing his own illegitimate son. Lila would come to accept his illegitimate grandson, Justus, who shared many of her ethics.

Tracy's 2003 return to Port Charles delighted Lila, that is until Tracy revealed Skye was not really a Quartermaine. Disappointed, Lila kicks Tracy out of the mansion. She returns not long after with her teenaged son Dillon Quartermaine in tow. In 2004, The Port Charles Hotel, which the Quartermaine family had owned for many years, catches fire and burns to the ground trapping many inside. The situation causes Edward to have a near fatal heart attack. Ned and Reginald are left to try to keep Lila away from the television, worried the news would kill her.

In July, Lila tells Edward she loves him before going to bed for the evening. The following morning, Edward discovers Lila has died in her sleep. Despite the usual bickering, the Quartermaines and the rest of Port Charles come together to say goodbye to Lila at her funeral. Many old friends return for the funeral, including Lee and Gail Baldwin, Lucy Coe, Kevin Collins, Robin Scorpio, and Amanda Barrington. The Quartermaine family is once again at odds when Lila's confidante Felicia Scorpio-Jones reveals Lila had instituted a contest as to which family member would receive the bulk of Lila's estate. In the end, it is Edward's illegitimate grandson, Justus Ward, who wins the contest.

When Sam McCall is pregnant in late 2004, she suggests naming her daughter, later stillborn, Lila to honor Jason's grandmother, as Jason would be helping to raise the baby. In 2006, Skye names her daughter Lila Rae Alcazar in honor of her adoptive grandmother Lila. On November 21, 2012, as Tracy grieves for Edward, she envisions him reuniting with Lila as they walk into the afterlife together.

== Frank Smith ==
Frank Smith
- General Hospital character
- Portrayed by: George Gaynes (1979–80); Mitchell Ryan (1993–94); Joseph Cortese (2015)
- Duration: 1979–80; 1993–94; 2015
- First appearance: 1979
- Last appearance: July 6, 2015
- Created by: Pat Falken Smith; Margaret DePriest
- Introduced by: Gloria Monty (1979); Wendy Riche (1993); Frank Valentini (2015)
In-universe information
- Other names: Jack Harris
- Occupation: Mobster
- Spouse: Mary Lynn Goller
- Children: Damian Smith; Jennifer Smith

Frank Smith is a fictional character from the ABC Daytime soap opera, General Hospital.

Frank is a notorious mobster who employed Luke Spencer at his money laundering operation, the Campus Disco. Frank ordered Luke to execute a "hit" on senate candidate Mitch Williams. Luke's pal and sister beau Roy DiLucca decided to carry out the hit himself. After the foiled attempt on Mitch's life, Roy was presumed dead after Mitch's security agents shot at him. He supposedly dies in Bobbie Spencer's arms, only to return twenty years later after a long stretch in Pentonville federal prison.

Because Luke failed to carry out Frank's orders he was forced to marry Frank's daughter Jennifer Smith. After seeing Luke and Jennifer together countless times, a distraught Laura accidentally locked herself in the office at the disco. She overheard Frank and Luke discussing "business". Frank realized Laura was eavesdropping and forced her to continue working at the disco so he could keep an eye on her.

Laura tried to convince Luke to break off his engagement to Jennifer. However, Luke knew that doing so would get him, Laura and their loved-ones killed. The day Luke and Jennifer's wedding was to take place on Frank Smith's yacht, Scott Baldwin pulled Luke out of the ceremony and started beating him. Luke fell overboard and was thought to have drowned. He later resurfaced and with Laura's help came up with a plan that involved the book of mob contacts that they had stolen from Frank earlier.

Luke and Laura went on the run with Frank's henchmen hot on their trail. One of the men named "Hutch" ended up befriending the two and could not kill them. The other hit man attempted to complete the hit but was discovered and killed by Hutch.

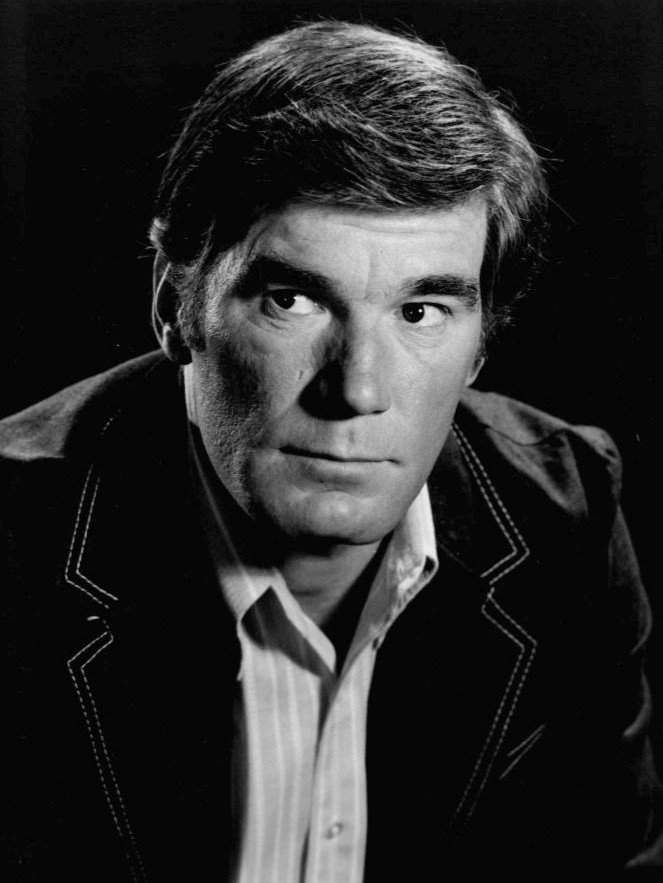
Mitchell Ryan assumed the role of mob kingpin Frank Smith when the character returned to the canvas in 1993.

It turned out that with Frank's black book, Luke and Laura did indeed have the evidence they needed to send Frank to prison. In 1984, Frank framed Luke for a murder that was committed in Mexico and his best friend Robert Scorpio helped Luke clear his name. Laura had just announced her first pregnancy, and they were on the run once more.

In 1993, Frank's hit men track Luke and Laura to the Triple L Diner in Canada and blew up their truck thinking they were inside. For safety reasons Luke and Laura send their son Lucky Spencer back to Port Charles to live with Luke's "aunt" Ruby Anderson. Frank's men found Lucky staying with his cousin Sly Eckert. They also find Sly's father Bill Eckert, who is the spitting image of Luke. Bill is shot in a case of mistaken identity, and dies in Luke's arms.

Luke and Laura, with their son Lucky, decided to hide in plain sight, back in Port Charles. Damian Smith, on behalf of his father, promises Luke that he and his family will be safe if Luke will help smuggle people into the country, with mobster Sonny Corinthos as a liaison. Luke says yes until he can figure out how to get rid of Smith. It turns out to be no easy task and puts him back in touch with a much-changed Jennifer. To get him out in the open, Luke helps spring Frank from prison in 1993.

This time Laura had announced her second pregnancy with (Lulu Spencer). Smith kidnaps a very pregnant Laura and uses her as a human shield and gets away. Lucky follows his father to a meeting with Frank's henchman and is shot but makes a full recovery. Finally, they at last have a final showdown at a cemetery in Puerto Rico in which Luke kills Frank. After Frank's death, Sonny Corinthos takes over his organization.

In 2015, it is revealed that Frank Smith is still alive, and survived being shot by Luke, but is paralyzed and uses a wheelchair. This causes Smith to exact revenge on Luke by kidnapping both his sons Lucky and Ethan Lovett and holding them hostage in Canada. Luke, Laura, Holly Sutton (Ethan's mother), Lulu, and Dillon Quartermaine all travel to Canada to rescue Lucky and Ethan, and were all surprised and shocked to find out that Smith is alive and orchestrated Lucky and Ethan's kidnapping. Smith then decides that he wants to kill both Luke and Laura after agreeing with Luke to let Holly, Ethan, Lulu, and Dillon (Lucky escaped Smith's clutches) go and spare all of their lives. Lucky then returned to shoot Smith and his henchmen with the help of his parents. Luke then shot Smith dead after he told him that Lucky was involved in his and Ethan's kidnapping. Lucky then told his parents that Smith forced him to be involved in his and Ethan's kidnapping because Smith revealed to him that his dead son Jake Spencer was still alive.

== Amy Vining ==
Amy Vining
- General Hospital character
- Kepler as Amy Vining
- Portrayed by: Cari Ann Warder (1975); Shell Kepler (1979–2002)
- Duration: 1975; 1979–2002
- First appearance: 1975
- Last appearance: August 12, 2002
- Created by: Bridget and Jerome Dobson
- Introduced by: James Young (1975); Gloria Monty (1979)
- Spin-off appearances: Port Charles
In-universe information
- Occupation: Registered Nurse
- Parents: Jason Vining; Barbara Vining
- Sisters: Laura Spencer (illegal)
- Nieces and nephews: Nikolas Cassadine (illegal); Lucky Spencer (illegal); Lulu Spencer (illegal)

Amy Vining is a fictional character on the ABC Daytime soap opera General Hospital. Cari Ann Warder originated the role in 1975. Shell Kepler assumed the role in 1979 and last appeared in August 2002. When Kepler died in 2008, the series paid tribute with an "In Memoriam" message at the end of the February 26, 2008 airing.

Amy is the daughter of Barbara and Jason Vining and sister to Laura Spencer. In the mid-1970s, it is revealed that Laura is actually the daughter of Lesley Williams and had been switched at birth with Barbara's real daughter, who had been stillborn. Lesley finds out the truth and brings Laura home; Laura returns to the Vinings when she is homesick. Laura joins a cult and is eventually found by Lesley and Rick Webber, who bring her home with them to Port Charles in 1976.

In 1979, 16-year-old Amy (whose father Jason Vining has just died) goes looking for Laura and causes strain on Laura's recent marriage to Scott Baldwin. Amy goes to live with Laura's parents, Lesley and Rick. It is clear from the beginning that Amy has secret resentments against Laura who left for a seemingly better life and doesn't seem to appreciate it. Later that year, Amy is indirectly responsible for Laura's winding up at the Campus Disco the night she is raped by her future second husband, Luke Spencer, when Amy distractedly forgets to tell Laura that Scott will not be picking her up. Amy later becomes a nurse at General Hospital, known for her gossiping and ditzy nature.

One of Amy's first jobs was to take care of a bedridden Monica Quartermaine who was pregnant at the time with A.J. Amy developed a crush on Alan Quartermaine and reported Monica's activities to Alan even though he didn't return her affections. When Tracy Quartermaine asked Amy to help her get information from Alan, Monica and A.J.'s files, Amy aided Alan by switching A.J.'s blood type to his and Monica's so Tracy would drop the demand for a paternity test. While Amy is a regular participant in Richard Simmons' exercise classes, she causes a lot of trouble with her tattling on chubby Beverly DeFreest for eating a candy bar on a break, and not thinking before speaking, especially after Laura was raped. Many members of the class would tell her off for these indiscretions, particularly Laura's close friend Claudia Johnson, and even Laura's own nemesis, Bobbie Spencer. When Heather Webber came out of her LSD induced state in 1981, Amy felt sorry for her and became her confidante, blurting out information that helped Heather stay one step ahead of the police while the Diana Taylor murder investigation was going on.

In 1981, Amy is the maid of honor at Laura's wedding to Luke and was devastated months later when Laura disappeared without a trace. Amy has one of her few romantic involvements with boxer Johnny Morissey in 1982, but he's dealing with mob influence on his career. Amy, head over heels in love with Johnny, steals a sponge which was held in evidence against Johnny's manager, Packy Moore, causing Rick to give her a vicious tongue lashing. Johnny leaves town after Packy dies, and months later, Amy receives a letter indicating that he is breaking up with her, leaving her heartbroken. Amy deals with the growing Webber household when Rick and Lesley take in Blackie Parrish and adopt the orphaned Mikey Phelan. The following year, Amy is thrilled to discover that Laura is alive and back in Port Charles, but in early 1984, she grieves along with the Webbers when Lesley is supposedly killed in a car accident. Amy was originally a member of Blackie's band, but when Blackie got a new agent, Steffie Brandt, Blackie was forced by her to fire Amy. Over the years, Amy remains a gossipy presence at the hospital, frequently getting in trouble with lectures from Steve, Jessie, Audrey and hospital administrator Dan Rooney. Amy's gossip frequently causes neglect, such as an incident when information she failed to give is blamed on Bobbie.

In 1987, Amy had another shot at romance with Dr. Patrick O'Connor and bickered with Celeste, a fellow nurse who also had her eyes set on Patrick. But he still had feelings for former sister-in-law Terri Brock which prevented his relationship with Amy from moving forward. When several of the hospital's doctors and nurses decide to share a large apartment, Amy joins them and her constant gossip and meddling causes a lot of misunderstandings which leads to them threatening to kick Amy out unless she changes her ways. When Luke and Laura return to town in 1993, Laura notices that Amy has had her breasts enlarged. Amy and Laura remain close and Amy is always there for Laura's family, especially when Lesley is revealed to be alive in 1996. Although she never marries, throughout the years Amy is flirtatious with many men of Port Charles. She is last seen in the fall of 2002, concerned about Laura's condition after Laura allegedly killed her stepfather Rick, who had come back to town for Luke and Laura's remarriage. Amy is mentioned by the visiting Richard Simmons in 2013 as being his favorite source for hospital gossip.

== Jeff Webber ==
Jeff Webber
- General Hospital character
- Portrayed by: Richard Dean Anderson (1976–1981); William R. Moses (2022)
- Duration: 1976–1981, 2022
- First appearance: 1976
- Created by: Eileen Pollock and Robert Mason Pollock
- Introduced by: Tom Donovan (1976); Frank Valentini (2022)
In-universe information
- Other names: Jeffrey Webber
- Occupation: Physician
- Family: Hardy/Webber family
- Parents: Steve Hardy; Helene Webber
- Stepfather: Lars Webber
- Stepmother: Audrey Hardy
- Half-brothers: Rick Webber; Tom Hardy (adoptive)
- Half-sisters: Terri Arnett
- Spouse: Monica Bard (1976–1977); Heather Grant (1978–1981); Carolyn Webber (1981–present)
- Sons: Steve Webber
- Daughters: Sarah Webber; Elizabeth Webber; Hayden Barnes
- Grandsons: Cameron Spencer; Jake Webber; Aiden Spencer
- Granddaughters: Violet Finn
- Grandparents: Lyle Hardy; Bernice Hardy
- Nephews: Mike Webber (adoptive); Rick Webber, Jr. Tommy Hardy
- Nieces: Laura Webber (adoptive)

Jeff Webber is a fictional character from the ABC daytime drama General Hospital. Eventually, he is revealed to be the biological son of the series' patriarch, Dr. Steve Hardy. He was portrayed by Richard Dean Anderson from 1976 until March 6, 1981. On October 18, 2022, it was announced that the role had been recast with actor William R. Moses.

Dr. Jeff Webber arrives in the spring of 1976 after graduating from medical school. Newlyweds Jeff and Dr. Monica Bard Webber (then Patsy Rahn) plan to join the staff of General Hospital following in the footsteps of Jeff's older brother, Rick Webber, who had reportedly been killed in a plane crash over Africa. Steve Hardy uses the couple in an experimental program at the hospital called Mr. and Mrs. Intern. Steve assumes they are ideally happy, but in actuality, their marriage is facing trouble. Jeff fears everyone at the hospital is comparing him to his brother Rick. Rick appears alive, still in love with Monica. Jeff is angry and jealous as their feelings develop into an affair. In response, he has an affair with Heather Grant, a scheming nanny who wants Jeff to herself. Heather becomes pregnant but does not tell Jeff. Jeff disappears for a time until he shows up at a bar called Barney's Place where he is drunk and high on amphetamines. Jeff steals a gun and is found unconscious with a bullet in his brain. Thinking Jeff is on his deathbed, his sister Terri Webber tells Steve Hardy that while her mother, Helene, was dying she had revealed a letter stating Steve was Jeff's father. Jeff lives and they decide not to tell him the truth. In 1977, Jeff has a slow recovery from his bullet wound and Monica reconciles with him out of guilt. When Heather reveals she is pregnant, Jeff tells her to have an abortion. Heather fakes a suicide attempt and demands Jeff leave Monica, but he refuses. Heather moves to New York to give birth, then sells the baby to Peter and Diana Taylor for $10,000 and tells Jeff the baby died. When Monica learns that Rick had asked Lesley Faulkner to marry him, she asks Jeff for a divorce. On the rebound, Jeff asks Heather to marry him. They marry in 1978, and Heather becomes the nanny of her own child, named P.J. Taylor. Heather becomes pregnant again but loses the baby. In the winter of 1979, General Hospital is placed under quarantine due to an outbreak of Lassa fever and Steve falls ill. Believing Steve is on his deathbed, his wife Audrey Hardy tells Jeff that Steve is his biological father. Jeff is upset by the news but eventually forms a close relationship with Steve. Meanwhile, Heather is obsessed with her son whom she had sold to the Taylors, and plans to put LSD in Diana Taylor's drink to make her go insane. The glasses are switched and Heather drinks the LSD. She begins to wildly hallucinate and Jeff has to send her to a sanitarium. It is then revealed baby P.J. Taylor is really Jeff's son Steven Lars Webber. Peter Taylor dies of a heart attack when he hears this, and in order to keep from losing her adopted son, Diana Taylor marries Jeff, who still does not know the child is his. In 1980, Jeff falls in love with Audrey Hardy's niece Annie Logan and they plan to wed. In 1981, they break up and Jeff has an affair with Diana, who finally tells Jeff that P.J. is his son. Shortly thereafter Diana is killed by Heather's mother, Alice Grant, who tries to frame Annie for the murder. Jeff takes his son Steven and moves to Carson City.

Jeff later asks Heather for a divorce and married another woman, whom Lesley later identifies as being named Carolyn on Thanksgiving in 1982. Jeff and Carolyn have two daughters, Elizabeth Webber and Sarah Webber, who they raised in Colorado. The girls moved to Port Charles to live with Audrey in 1997 when Jeff and Carolyn moved to Sarajevo to help in the war effort. Steve and Elizabeth have mentioned they were never close with either of their parents. Sarah is the only Webber sibling who is close with Jeff. As of 2013, he and his wife are mentioned, by Elizabeth, to be living in Asia.

In late summer of 2016, Heather explained to her son Franco, that she has kept a secret in exchange for cash nearly her entire life. She reveals that after Jeff left her, he had an affair with a woman, Naomi Dreyfus, and Heather figures out that Hayden Barnes, Naomi's daughter, is in fact Jeff's unknown daughter.

== Rick Webber ==
Rick Webber
- General Hospital character
- Portrayed by: Michael Gregory (1976–78); Chris Robinson (1978–2013)
- Duration: 1976–86; 2002; 2013
- First appearance: August 10, 1976
- Last appearance: April 2, 2013
- Created by: Eileen Pollock; Robert Mason Pollock
- Introduced by: Tom Donovan (1976); Jill Farren Phelps (2002); Frank Valentini (2013)
In-universe information
- Other names: Richard Webber
- Occupation: Former Surgeon at General Hospital
- Family: Webber
- Parents: Lars Webber; Helene Webber
- Sisters: Terri Arnett
- Half-brothers: Jeff Webber
- Spouse: Lesley Williams (1977–80, 1981–84); Ginny Blake (1984–96)
- Sons: Rick Webber, Jr.
- Adoptive sons: Mike Webber; Blackie Parrish (foster)
- Adoptive daughters: Laura Webber
- Grandsons: Nikolas Cassadine (adoptive); Lucky Spencer (adoptive)
- Granddaughters: Lulu Spencer (adoptive)
- Nephews: Steve Webber
- Nieces: Sarah Webber; Elizabeth Webber; Hayden Barnes

Rick Webber is a fictional character from the ABC Daytime soap opera, General Hospital. The role was originated by Michael Gregory, who appeared on the series from 1976 to 1978. Following Gregory's departure, the role was re-cast with Chris Robinson, who remained with the series until November 26, 1986. Following a sixteen-year absence, Robinson reprised the role from June 27 to August 30, 2002, at which point the character was murdered at the hands of Scott Baldwin on August 9, 2002. On March 11, 2013, it was announced that Robinson would reprise the role for the series' 50th anniversary and appeared on April 2, 2013.

While on sabbatical in Africa, Rick is presumed dead in a plane crash. Rick returns in 1976 alive only to find his lover, Monica Bard (Leslie Charleson) has married his younger brother Jeff (Richard Dean Anderson). Meanwhile, Rick romances Dr. Lesley Faulkner (Denise Alexander) in November 1976. Rick adopts Lesley's teenage daughter, Laura (Genie Francis). In 1979, Rick and Monica rekindle their romance despite her new marriage to Alan Quartermaine (Stuart Damon). Monica later discovers she is pregnant and the child is believed to be Rick's. Rick divorces Lesley in the summer of 1980 to marry Monica, only for a DNA test to prove that the child is actually Alan's. A devastated Rick reunites with Lesley and they remarry in December 1981. In 1983, Rick and Lesley adopt a son, Michael "Mike" Phelan. However, the happiness is short lived and Lesley is killed in a car accident in March 1984. Rick then marries Mike's biological mother, Ginny Blake (Judith Chapman) in August of that year and together they have a son, Rick Webber, Jr. in 1985. Rick and Ginny leave Port Charles in the fall of 1986. Lesley is revealed to be alive in 1996, but he and Lesley do not reunite until 2002.

In 2002, when Laura plans to remarry her ex-husband, Luke Spencer (Anthony Geary), she invites Rick to walk her down the aisle. While in the attic of their old home, Laura remembers a terrifying incident that occurred in the summer of 1978, when the teenaged Laura discovered Rick having an affair with nurse Theresa Carter. Theresa panicked and attacked Laura, who hit her with a camera and accidentally killed her. Rick drugged a hysterical Laura to keep her from remembering the incident and over the years, she eventually blocked out the entire ordeal. On her wedding day, Rick finds a broken Laura in the attic and tries to drug her once again. However, Rick ends up dead and Luke skips town with a fragile Laura believing she killed Rick. Laura suffers a severe psychotic break and ends up in a mental hospital. In 2007, it is revealed that Laura's high school sweetheart and ex-husband, Scott Baldwin (Kin Shriner) had actually killed Rick in 2002.

On April 2, 2013, Rick appears as a ghost along with Alan and Emily Quartermaine (Natalia Livingston). He and Alan finally make peace and encourage Monica and Alan's sister Tracy (Jane Elliot) to do the same.

== Mitch Williams ==
Mitch Williams
- General Hospital character
- Portrayed by: Christopher Pennock
- Duration: 1978–80
- First appearance: 1978
- Last appearance: June 1980
- Introduced by: Gloria Monty
In-universe information
- Occupation: Assistant District Attorney
- Wife: Tracy Quartermaine (1979–8?)

Mitch Williams is a fictional character on the ABC Daytime drama, General Hospital, portrayed by Christopher Pennock from 1978 to 1980.

Mitch Williams was introduced as the D.A. in Lesley Webber's trial for the murder of David Hamilton. He was ambitious and ruthless, hoping a conviction would guarantee him a state senate seat. He attracted the attention of two women: upscale restaurant waitress Susan Moore, with whom he was in love, and wealthy Tracy Quartermaine who had just ended a disastrous marriage to faux Lord Larry Ashton. Her father, Edward Quartermaine had cut her off, refusing to bankroll any more of her escapades until she found herself a husband. Tracy, desperate to remain in her father's good graces, pushed Mitch, who had ties to organized crime to marry her. Lured in by the Quartermaine fortune, Mitch married Tracy, but continued to see Susan on the side. Tracy finances his campaign for State Senate to keep a hold over him. Mitch has no choice but to give in to her demands to crack down on organized crime—starting with the mob's rumored control of the Campus Disco run by head mobster Frank Smith. Smith arranges for his manager of the disco, Luke Spencer, to carry out a hit on Mitch. In order to save his good friend, Roy DiLucca attempts to carry out the hit himself. The attempt fails and Roy is shot by Mitch's security detail. He is presumed dead but really sent to Pentonville federal prison. Mitch then runs for governor of New York, and Edward agrees to give Tracy two million dollars, only to be spent on Mitch's race. Tracy, tired of competing with Susan for Mitch's affections, uses the money to lure Mitch away from her. Mitch chooses money over love and leaves Port Charles for Albany. Tracy knows she cannot compete with Susan, so leaves and joins Mitch in Albany. Their marriage does not last long and they divorce sometime after their departure. Tracy however doesn't resurface in Port Charles until 1989, and nothing is mentioned of Mitch except the comment that she had made several marital mistakes, glaring at her ex-husband Larry Ashton when she said that.
