= Alan Quartermaine (General Hospital) =

Fictional character from General Hospital

- General Hospital character
- Portrayed by: Stuart Damon (1977–2013); Uncredited (2014)
- Duration: 1977–2008; 2011–2014
- First appearance: September 13, 1977
- Last appearance: April 1, 2014
- Created by: Eileen and Robert Mason Pollock
- Introduced by: Gloria Monty
- Book appearances: Robin's Diary; The Secret Life of Damian Spinelli
- Spin-off appearances: Port Charles
In-universe information
- Other names: Alan James Quartermaine; Simon Alexander
- Occupation: Physician; Chief of Staff at General Hospital; Stockholder of ELQ Industries
- Family: Quartermaine
- Parents: Edward Quartermaine; Lila Quartermaine
- Sisters: Tracy Quartermaine
- Half-brothers: Bradley Ward; Jimmy Lee Holt
- Spouse: Monica Bard (1978–90, 1991–2007); Lucy Coe (1990–91)
- Sons: A. J. Quartermaine; Jason Morgan; Andrew Cain
- Adoptive daughters: Skye Quartermaine; Emily Quartermaine
- Stepdaughters: Dawn Winthrop
- Grandsons: Michael Corinthos; Jake Webber; Danny Morgan; Oscar Nero
- Granddaughters: Lila Rae Alcazar; Scout Cain
- Grandfathers: George Quartermaine; Harold Morgan
- Grandmothers: Ida Zemlock
- Uncles: Hal Morgan
- Nephews: Justus Ward; Ned Ashton; Dillon Quartermaine; Austin Gatlin Holt
- Nieces: Faith Ward
- First cousins: Alexandria Quartermaine

Alan Quartermaine is a fictional character from General Hospital, an American soap opera on the ABC network. Created by head writer Douglas Marland, Stuart Damon first appeared in the role on September 13, 1977.

== Casting ==
Damon first appeared in the role of Alan Quartermaine on September 13, 1977. After several nominations, in 1999, Damon won his first Daytime Emmy Award in the Outstanding Supporting Actor category for his portrayal of Alan during his addiction to the drug Hydrocodone. After 30 years with the series, Damon was reportedly fired from the series and would exit in early 2007. Though Alan dies on-screen in February 2007, Damon continued appearing as Alan's ghost until December 23, 2008. Damon once again returned to the role for a dream sequence episode on August 29, 2011. In October 2012, TV Guide's Nelson Branco revealed that Damon had started taping scenes once again and Soap Opera Digest later verified that Damon would bring Alan's ghost back to the canvas in November. Stuart reprised the role of Alan on April 1 and 2, 2013, in celebration of the soap's 50th anniversary. An uncredited actor portrayed the role briefly on April 1, 2014, when the character appeared as a ghost to help bring A. J. Quartermaine to heaven.

== Storylines ==
=== Backstory ===
Alan James Quartermaine is born on July 4, 1945 in Southampton, New York to the wealthy and influential Lila and Edward Quartermaine. He and little sister, Tracy, are raised with every advantage money can buy and they are spoiled rotten. During his early years as a medical student, Alan has an affair with Rae Cummings who would give birth to a daughter, Skye. The controlling Edward steals the infant and sells the child on the black market, and tells Rae the child is dead. Alan knew all along that Rae was pregnant but he wasn't sure he was ready to be a father. As of 2012, Alan's date of birth has been revised to February 23, 1948.

=== 1970s–1980s ===
Dr. Alan Quartermaine is contacted by General Hospital's chief of staff, Steve Hardy to help with funding the new cardiac wing. He catches the eye of Dr. Monica Webber and the two clash in their work. Their relationship develops into a romance and Alan chooses to stay in Port Charles; his wealthy, and colorful family soon follows. Alan and Monica marry on March 7, 1978 but their happiness is threatened due to Monica's growing closeness to her former love, Dr. Rick Webber. In 1979, Alan and Monica welcome their son, Alan Jr; however, Tracy leads her brother to believe Rick is the boy's father. A furious Alan plots to kill the lovers in 1980; at the last minute, Alan rescues them realizing he'd be the only suspect. Alan and Monica's marriage is tested again when Alan begins having an affair with Susan Moore which leads to the birth of his son, Jason in 1981. During this time, Alan and Monica's only civil encounters were their shared suspicion that Alan's cousin, Alexandria, was up to something shady, which Alan feared might prevent him from being able to continue to support Susan and his son. As Alan prepares to divorce Monica, Monica begins flirting with another man making him realize how much he loves her. Attempts at remaining apart fail miserably, and Monica's denial that their sexual dalliance meant a reconciliation couldn't hide the fact that Alan had simply become bored with Susan, while his fights with Monica excited him. After officially reconciling with Monica, Alan broke it off with Susan, but promised major financial support for her and Jason. With encouragement from Scott Baldwin and her cousin, Heather, Susan sues Alan for millions of dollars, and manages to get a million dollar trust fund for Jason. In early 1983, Alan is a suspect in Susan's murder investigation and it is later revealed that she was actually killed by Lila's first husband, Crane Tolliver who reveals that he and Lila never divorced. Meanwhile, Jimmy Lee Holt comes to Port Charles and reveals that he is Edward's illegitimate son. Jimmy Lee teams up with Heather in an attempt to blackmail the family with Lila's unsigned divorce papers. Alan manages to convince Monica to let Jason move into the mansion.

In late 1985, Monica has an affair with Jimmy Lee's business partner, Sean Donely. When the deal goes bad, Sean bankrupts the Quartermaines and Alan blames Jimmy Lee while Monica forces them out of the mansion. In a scheme to get the family fortune back, Alan fakes his death, frames Sean for his murder and disappears to Pautuck, New York where he lives under the alias Simon; he has a brief fling with country girl Charity Gatlin. After a bump on the head leads to Alan believing he really is Simon, Monica realizes how much she loves him and they reunite. In 1988, Monica beats out Alan for the chief of staff position at GH; however the job proves to be too much and Monica quits, briefly leaving town to stay at a spa. Meanwhile, Alan tracks down Tracy's son Ned Ashton. In the spring of 1989, Alan clashes with Ned after Edward is presumed dead and leaves his entire fortune to Ned. In October 1989, Lucy Coe seduces Alan into helping her dispose of Victor Jerome's body.

=== 1990s ===
In the spring of 1990, Monica divorces Alan after finding him in bed with Lucy. Lucy later claims she is pregnant and Alan marries her. However, Alan learns that Scott Baldwin was actually the child's father and divorces her. He and Monica reconcile and remarry on August 16, 1991. Meanwhile, Alan and Monica welcomed their sons, A.J. and Jason back to the mansion. A.J. falls for Nikki Langton who is going after the Quartermaine fortune to get revenge on Monica for her father, David's death. She manipulates A.J. into a marriage proposal and in November 1992, Alan pays Nikki to leave town, leaving his son devastated. Alan soon develops an infatuation with the mother of his son Jason's girlfriend, Rhonda Wexler. Though they never consummate the relationship, Alan becomes very protective of her and in 1993, accidentally kills her abusive ex-boyfriend Ray Conway when he finds him abusing her and Karen. A.J. attempts to frame Jagger Cates for the murder, but he is eventually cleared. In 1994, Alan and Tracy also learn they have another illegitimate sibling, the late Bradley Ward who was murdered in the 70s. When Edward is arrested for his murder, Bradley's mother Mary Mae is forced to admit to the world that Bradley is Edward's son and he would not have killed him. Monica is later diagnosed with breast cancer and must have a mastectomy; though Alan is supportive, Monica feels unloved and goes to Arizona for treatment. Monica returns and they decide to adopt in Emily Bowen, the daughter of another cancer patient and Monica's friend, Paige Bowen, who had recently died of cancer. Monica's self-esteem diminished while she struggled with the disease and she succumbed to the advances of her colleague, Dr. Pierce Dorman. Despite the affair, Alan continues supporting his wife even after Dorman sues Monica for sexual harassment. During the trial, Alan is furious when Ned reveals that he and Monica had an affair years prior. In late 1995, a drunken A.J. gets into a car wreck, which leaves Jason with permanent brain damage and no recollection of his life.

Due to an old hand injury, Alan has to get an operation so he can continue working as surgeon. Alan later becomes addicted to pain killers. The rest of the family is also in crisis as Monica deals with the sexual harassment suit, a teenage Emily has also become a drug addict, while A.J. is fighting Jason and his estranged wife Carly for custody of his son, Michael. Alan becomes so dependent on his drugs that he loses his job at General Hospital and is banished from the family. Alan forces himself into rehab and soon reunites with his family clean and sober; he also successfully started work at GH again.

=== 2000s ===
In March 2000, Alan's former love, Dr. Rae Cummings comes to Port Charles searching for the child she thought died. Monica is jealous of their close relationship. When Monica has a pregnancy scare, it is instead, proven to be menopause. Alan becomes fixated on the idea of having another child, until Emily is kidnapped and A.J. nearly dies from alcohol poisoning and they force him into rehab. After another cancer scare in early 2001, Monica and Alan decide to renew their wedding vows; on the day of the ceremony, Skye Chandler arrives and reveals that she is Alan and Rae's long lost daughter. Skye moves into the mansion and causes quite a bit of trouble amongst the family and even comes between Alan and Monica. Alan is able to forgive Skye when he witnesses her remorse at an AA meeting, however, this causes tension between him and Monica. Over the next few years, Alan becomes Skye's defender, despite most of the family's refusal to accept her. A.J. also continues his schemes to regain custody of his son Michael. Edward and Alan are hell bent on bringing Ned's "daughter" Kristina into the Quartermaine mansion; they convince social services that her mother Alexis Davis is an unfit mother. In 2003, Tracy makes a shocking return and reveals that Skye isn't Alan's daughter after all. Despite the revelation, Alan legally adopts Skye as his daughter. In 2005, a sympathetic Alan helps A.J. with his plans to get Michael back away from his adoptive father, mob boss, Sonny Corinthos; however, Alan turns him in upon realizing the lengths A.J. was willing to go to get his own way. In February 2007, Alan and several others are taken hostage at the Metro Court hotel by Jerry Jacks. When Alan suffers a heart attack, he is forced to suffer through the pain and his grandson Michael was devastated. On February 26, Alan dies from heart failure at General Hospital. His memorial service is held on March 5 with Ned delivering a touching eulogy.

=== Posthumous life ===
Despite his death, Alan continues making ghostly appearances throughout 2007, torturing Tracy with the fact that she forged his will to leave his entire estate to her. In actuality, any of Jason's future children would inherit the majority of his estate. Alan warns Tracy that he will not move until she admits what she did, leading to Edward's having her committed. Alan finally disappears when Tracy completes the selfless task of watching over her stepdaughter, Lulu Spencer. On Christmas in 2008, Monica sees Alan's ghost after she receives a special pair of glasses as a gift. Alan and Monica immediately fall into their familiar round of bickering banter and profess their love for one another.

In August 2011, Alan appears alive in Monica's fantasy that Jason never got into the accident with A.J. and is being named chief of staff at General Hospital.

In 2012, Heather Webber reveals that Susan gave birth to twin boys when Jason was born; one was the crazed artist, Robert Frank, known professionally as Franco. In November 2013, Heather admits the truth that she lied about Jason and Franco being twins and Franco is really her son with Scott Baldwin. However, in 2017, it is revealed that Susan did in fact gave birth to twin boys: Jason and his twin brother, Andrew "Drew" Cain (Billy Miller, later Cameron Mathison). A. J. Quartermaine resurfaces in Port Charles after the presumed death of his brother Jason, and it is revealed that Monica faked his death to protect him from going jail but, did not tell Alan, because of his feelings towards A. J., who shot him in the back. Monica insists that A.J. hide to avoid prison time for the kidnapping of Michael Corinthos, Kristina Davis and Morgan Corinthos, but A. J. decides to leave and go to a Halloween party to confront Michael. Alan appears to Monica in the Quartermaine living room and A. J. at the Quartermaine crypt, telling them both that he is not angry at either of them. Alan tells A. J. that creating a relationship with Michael would be the hardest thing he's ever done. Alan reminds Monica of some of their old memories. Monica tells Alan she loves him.

Tracy stands in the Quartermaine foyer alone, lamenting that she is alone again in life. Alan touches his hand on her shoulder. She feels it and turns around, but Alan is already gone. A. J. returns home from the crypt and promises Monica he will never leave her again. Alan watches on and smiles.

== Reception ==
In 2023, Charlie Mason from Soaps She Knows placed Alan at #27 on his ranked list of General Hospital's 40+ Greatest Characters of All Time, commenting that "Somewhere along the line, Monica's "better" half must've given himself a heart transplant, since the formerly-mad-as-in-angry doctor went from wanting to drop a house on her to being the true partner that she mourned as mightily as we did."
