= Shell Kepler =

American actress (1958–2008)

- Kepler as Nurse Amy Vining on General Hospital
- Born: Michelle Alaine Kepler; October 5, 1958; Painesville, Ohio, U.S.
- Died: February 1, 2008 (aged 49); Portland, Oregon, U.S.
- Occupation: Actress
- Years active: 1978–2002
- Notable work: General Hospital
- Spouse(s): Kenny Ryback (5/20/1985–1991; divorced); Robert DeSantis (4/17/1993–2000; divorced)

Michelle Alaine Kepler (October 5, 1958 – February 1, 2008), was an American television actress best known for her work on General Hospital as "Nurse Amy Vining", from 1979 until 2002.

== Early life ==
Kepler was born in Ohio, and her family moved to Arcadia, California when she was 10. She had one brother, Fred, who is named after their father.

== Career ==
Kepler portrayed busybody nurse Amy Vining, a "fan favourite" and sister of Laura Spencer's, on General Hospital, from 1979 to 2002. She also appeared on the General Hospital spinoff Port Charles, other shows such as CHiPs and Three's Company, and the movie Homework (1982) with Joan Collins.

Kepler was also a businesswoman, who marketed a line of clothing on the former Home Shopping Club. In a 1994 Associated Press interview, she claimed that her "Lacy Afternoon" collection had earned more than $20 million in sales that year.

After her TV career ended, she moved to Portland, Oregon and was active in charitable fundraising.

== Personal life ==
Kepler married and divorced twice, and had 3 children. She and her General Hospital costar Jacklyn Zeman (who played Barbara Jean "Bobbie" Spencer) were close friends.

Kepler died from kidney failure, on February 1, 2008, at Oregon Health & Science University. Zeman delivered a eulogy at her funeral. The February 26, 2008 episode of General Hospital was dedicated to Kepler, "In loving memory."
