= Heather Webber (General Hospital) =

Fictional character from General Hospital

- General Hospital character
- Alley Mills as Heather Webber
- Portrayed by: Georganne LaPiere (1976–1977); Mary O'Brien (1977–1979); Robin Mattson (1980–2016); Alley Mills (2022–present)
- Duration: 1976–1983; 2004; 2012–2016; 2022–2024; since 2026
- First appearance: July 29, 1976
- Created by: Eileen Pollock and Robert Mason Pollock
- Introduced by: Tom Donovan (1976); Jill Farren Phelps (2004); Frank Valentini (2012, 2022)
- Robin Mattson as Heather Webber

- Georganne LaPiere as Heather Webber
In-universe information
- Other names: Susan Moore; Diana Taylor; Heather Grant; Heather Quartermaine; Shelly Vernon; The Hook Killer
- Occupation: Artist; Gossip columnist; Nanny
- Mother: Alice Grant
- Husband: Larry Joe Baker (pre–1976); Jeff Webber (1978–81); Edward Quartermaine (2004)
- Sons: Steve Webber; Franco Baldwin
- Daughters: Esme Prince
- Grandsons: Ace Prince-Cassadine
- First cousins: Susan Moore
- Other relatives: Jason Morgan; Drew Cain; Jake Webber; Danny Morgan; Emily Cain

Heather Webber is a fictional character and a main antagonist from General Hospital, an American soap opera on the ABC network. The character was introduced in the summer of 1976. Though played by several actresses, soap veteran Robin Mattson, who stepped into the role in 1980, is most recognized for her portrayal of Heather until 2016. In 2022, Alley Mills assumed the role; she departed in 2024 and returned in 2026.

Mattson received three Soapy Awards as Best Villainess for the role and a nomination as Outstanding Supporting Actress in a Drama Series for a Daytime Emmy Award in 1983.

== Casting ==
Georganne LaPiere originated the role of Heather Grant on July 29, 1976. In August 1977, it was reported that after a year with the series, instead of renewing her initial 48-week contract, LaPiere vacated the role of Heather to try to become a movie star like her half-sister Cher. She was quickly replaced by Mary O'Brien in September 1977. O'Brien vacated the role in July 1979 when Heather overdosed on LSD. O'Brien was offered the chance to reprise the role in 1980 but refused. On September 17, 1980, Robin Mattson, known for her role as Hope Bauer on Guiding Light, made her first appearance as Heather. Mattson departed from the series indefinitely on September 13, 1983. Mattson reprised the role for a brief six-month stint which started on June 25, 2004, and concluded on December 3, 2004. In February 2012, it was announced Mattson would again reprise the role, and made her onscreen return on April 2, 2012. After some speculation Mattson might be done with the show, she was again seen on-screen in September 2012, making sporadic returns as Heather's various storyline arcs dictated over the next year and a half. In October 2014, Mattson reprised her role as Heather again, airing into early 2015. In 2016, Mattson reprised her role as Heather on May 11, 2016, July 1, 2016, July 25, 2016, August 26 to 29, 2016, September 27, 2016, October 18, 2016 and on December 21, 2016.

In October 2022, Soap Opera Digest broke the news that Alley Mills, recognized for her role on The Bold and The Beautiful as Pamela Douglas, had joined the cast of General Hospital in a mysterious role. Mills appeared on October 28 as Heather Webber. Mattson disclosed she was unable to reprise the role for medical reasons. On February 27, 2023, she exited the role. On April 27 of the same year, Mills announced her return to the role. Mills exited the role a second time when Heather moved to Sedona, Arizona, with her last appearance airing on October 28, 2024. In September 2026, it was announced that Mills would reprise the role. Heather's return was set to air on November 5 of the same year. however, she aired on October 30.

== Storylines ==
=== 1976–1983 ===
The 19-year-old Heather Grant is first introduced in the summer of 1976. Local nurse, Diana Taylor hires Heather as the nanny of her young daughter, Martha. Desperately wanting the job, Heather gives Diana a forged letter of recommendation. She soon sets her sights on Dr. Monica Webber's husband, Dr. Jeff Webber. After Jeff and Monica have a fight, Heather comforts him and they have sex. When Jeff suddenly disappears, Heather learns she is pregnant. After Jeff attempts suicide, he is shocked to learn Heather is pregnant. Heather fakes a suicide attempt hoping to win Jeff's affections. However, because Jeff refuses to leave Monica, Heather decides she doesn't want the child. Instead of aborting her child at Jeff's request, she sells the newborn to Diana and her husband, Peter for ten thousand dollars. In 1977, after giving birth to Steven Lars, Heather takes five hundred dollars from Jeff and goes to New York City in hopes of becoming a famous model. Her landlady, Mrs. Hadley, arranges for the Taylors to adopt her son while concealing Heather's identity from the Taylors. However, after Hadley and a lawyer take their cut, Heather is left with only eighteen hundred of the ten thousand dollars. Instead of coming clean, Heather tells Jeff the baby was stillborn. To make up for her loss, Jeff proposes marriage. The two return to Port Charles where Heather gets a job as a nanny to the Taylors' new son, Peter "PJ" Taylor, Jr, who is actually her biological son.

In 1978, Heather gets a little carried away with the amount of attention she gives to PJ. The Taylors let her go, believing her obsession is unhealthy. Heather continues seeing her son in secret. Meanwhile, Heather and Jeff finally marry but they see very little of each other as Jeff is working long hours to get his medical license. Though Heather learns she is pregnant again, she is still miserable. Ironically, Jeff wants to name their new child "Steven Lars" if it's a boy. After suffering a miscarriage right before Thanksgiving, Heather vows to get Steven Lars back once and for all. In 1979, Heather begins her next scheme, attempting to drive Diana Taylor insane in hopes of gaining custody of her son. Due to Heather's manipulations, Diana grows even more dependent on Heather to help with PJ. Heather purchases LSD and puts it in Diana's drinking glass. However, little PJ mixes up the glasses. Heather unknowingly drinks the drug. When Heather begins hallucinating, Jeff is forced to have her committed to Pine Circle Sanitarium in July 1979. With Heather away, Alice takes over her daughter's manipulations. Diana realizes she will lose PJ if she doesn't marry Jeff.

In the fall of 1980, Heather emerges from her delusional state, fakes catatonia and escapes from Forest Hills Sanitarium. She goes to see Jeff but discovers he is now in love with Anne Logan. Eventually, she is officially released from Forest Hills. In 1981, Heather fakes hysteria and convinces Jeff's brother and sister-in-law Rick and Lesley to send her back to Forest Hills. From there, Heather sets her plan in motion to kill Diana Taylor and frame Anne for the murder. She escapes with a gun, only to find Jeff in bed with Diana. Appearing to kill Diana, Heather writes Anne's name in blood next to Diana's body. Jeff helps Anne clear herself by revealing that she feared Jeff had killed Diana. When Heather begins getting day passes to leave the sanatarium and shows up at Diana's funeral, Jeff decides it's time to protect their son from his unstable mother. Jeff prepares to leave town with Steven Lars, but Heather shows up that day, asking for one last moment with her son which Jeff reluctantly grants. Heather continues to feign her being sane thanks to the naive assistance of her new friend, Amy Vining, and pointedly tells Anne that she will win Jeff back because of her son, leaving Anne fearing for her safety because of her continued presence in everybody's life. Now living in Carson City Nevada, Jeff files for divorce while Police Chief Burt Ramsey discovers another gun killed Diana, pointing the finger at Heather. Heather's new admirer, Joe Kelly, had initially believed that Heather was guilty, but after other evidence arises, refuses to believe that she actually killed Diana. It is soon revealed Alice accidentally killed Diana in an attempt to keep Diana from killing Heather.

After Heather was cleared of Diana's murder, the judge sentenced Heather to probation for six months, allowing her psychiatrist, Dr. Seymour Katz, to decide if Heather would go free, go to jail or be sentenced to an institution. For a while, Heather's therapy with Dr. Katz went fine, and she was even given a job in the hospital admissions office. However, as Heather began to scheme to get Joe to marry her after getting her divorce decree from Jeff, Dr. Katz began to see Heather for who she really was. Heather discovered that Dr. Katz had left his previous employer under bizarre circumstances, and found one of his patients, a young woman named Cynthia Elliott, who had accused Dr. Katz of making improper advances towards her. It turned out that Dr. Katz was innocent, but Cynthia was unstable, and in front of the hospital staff, accused him of having tried to molest her. He wanted to help her, and was certain that Heather was behind the entire situation. Around the same time, Heather presented evidence against surgeon Dr. Arthur Bradshaw that proved that her long-time rival Anne Logan had not stolen evidence against Dr. Bradshaw in the death of a patient, and Dr. Katz realized that Heather had only turned it in to make herself appear to be cured. In everybody else's mind, she had, and when Anne and Jeremy departed Port Charles, Heather was there to bid her farewell. Shortly after this, Heather set up a frantic Cynthia Elliott in a waterfront cheap hotel and arranged Dr. Katz to find her there, leading to Cynthia shooting him. She was found catatonic after Dr. Katz was rushed into surgery, and after recovering, Dr. Katz simply decided to resign from General Hospital, warning Heather that he may return, and Cynthia may recover. To Heather's horror, Dr. Katz referred to her as his one failure.

After this, Heather was assigned to be under the treatment of the gentle Dr. Gail Baldwin who soon gave her a favorable report after Scotty tried to convince Gail to no avail that Heather was not cured. Soon after this, Joe, who had begun to realize that Heather was still an evil conniver, found Scotty and Heather in bed, and rallied at the two for their betrayal. When Heather returned to Kelly's diner to gather her things, Joe's stepmother, Rose, confronted Heather, and a fight ensued. Heather viciously accused Rose of having feelings for Joe herself, and Rose slapped her, realizing that she had been fooled into thinking Heather was her friend. Heather even used this scene as an excuse to taunt her mother, Alice, who had just arrived at Kelly's for her birthday dinner with Lesley. Heather used her cousin Susan's breakup with Alan Quartermaine to move into Susan's cottage, convincing Susan to go after the Quartermaine fortune for her newborn son, Jason, with Alan.

Eventually Scott, whom Heather became full-time lovers with, takes on Susan's lawsuit against the Quartermaines. However, Heather and Scott have secretly been planning to steal the cash. Susan and Scott become romantically involved much to Heather's dismay. In December 1982, Heather tricks Susan into giving her permission to raise Jason if anything happens to her. However, Susan soon catches on to Heather's schemes and convinces Scott to marry her so Heather can't get a dime of Jason's million dollar trust fund. Susan soon learns Heather and Scott were working together and bars him from getting any money. After Susan is murdered, Heather teams up with the illegitimate Quartermaine, Jimmy Lee Holt in an effort to get custody of Jason; however she eventually loses this battle to the Quartermaines. While working with Scotty as his secretary on the waterfront redevelopment project, Heather took an instant resentment to his new partner D.L. Brock who treated her with contempt, something Heather instantly resented. The one-upmanship between Heather and Scotty caused them to break up, and after being foiled by the Quartermains in a last ditch attempt to get custody of Jason after the death of her mother, Alice Grant, she quietly left town to look in on an ailing Steven Lars after trying and failing to seduce Alan.

=== 2004 ===
In June 2004, Heather returns to Port Charles, claiming she wants to reconnect with her family, including the returned-from-the-dead Lesley Webber. She moves into the Spencer home with Lesley to help take care of Lulu while Lulu's parents, Luke and Laura are absent. Lesley was injured in a car accident, presumably caused by medications slipped into her drink by Heather. Heather seduces the recently widowed Edward Quartermaine, much to the dismay of his daughter Tracy, who instantly remembers Heather's nefarious past. When Edward is haunted by his late wife, Lila, Heather keeps her distance, but later she pretends to be possessed by Lila's spirit and tricks the Quartermaines into believing Lila wants Edward to move on with her. Knowing Edward won't be easily convinced, she causes him to have a heart attack and is the only one who attempts to save his life, as the rest of his family believes he is faking. After he is released from the hospital, the two become engaged and they marry on October 20, 2004 at the Quartermaine cabin.

Heather's plans to get rich by killing Edward are stalled when he gives away his entire fortune to be with her. After Heather and Tracy have Edward committed, Luke helps bring Heather's schemes to light. Edward has the marriage annulled in November 2004. Due to Luke's tricks, Heather accidentally admits to killing police officer Ross Duncan and framing Edward's granddaughter, Skye for the murder. Heather kidnaps Skye. Luke tricks her into releasing Skye by pretending to marry her. Luke tells the authorities of Heather's crimes. She is declared insane and sent off to Ferncliff Sanitarium.

=== 2012–2016 ===
Heather is being held at Ferncliff when Sam Morgan shows up, looking for information on serial killer Franco, who has developed an obsession with Sam's husband, Jason. Heather tells Sam that Franco is Jason's twin brother. Heather is later released with the help of her son Steve, after convincing him that she's changed. However, from the minute she leaves Ferncliff, she stirs up trouble. Heather is obsessed with Steve, even upset about his girlfriend, Olivia Falconeri. She also is fixated on Luke, who is now dating Anna Devane. When Steve is arrested for murder, she murders his colleague, Maggie Wurth, and stages it as a suicide so Maggie will be blamed for the murder. Steve doesn't suspect Heather is involved.

Heather also becomes fixated on Sam, intent on ruining her life. She taunts Sam after she finds out Sam's unborn baby is not Jason's, but Franco's. Heather faces the wrath of Monica when she walks into the Quartermaine mansion uninvited, having had a restraining order placed against her in order to protect the ailing Edward. When she comes to see Luke, and runs into Tracy Quartermaine and Anthony Zacchara, she realizes Anthony is dead. Heather later steals Anthony's body, thinking she'll help Luke not go down for murder. While she's burying his body, she runs into Todd Manning, who is carrying Téa Delgado's newborn son Victor Lord III. Todd asks for Heather's help, because Victor isn't breathing. Heather tells Todd that Victor can't be saved. Meanwhile, Sam shows up, looking for help after delivering her newborn son. Sam passes out, and Todd finds her unborn baby. Téa comes by then, and believing Todd is holding her son, asks for him back. Heather convinces Todd to let Téa think the baby is hers, and leaves Téa's stillborn baby in place of Sam's. Sam is devastated by her baby's death, as is Jason. It's later revealed that Heather switched Sam's paternity test, and Jason is the father of Sam's baby.

Heather tries to get Luke to return her affections, but when he refuses, she kidnaps him, intending to woo him away from Anna. She also blackmails Todd into giving her a job at his newspaper. Anna finds Anthony's body, but is unable to charge Heather, who has come up with an alibi. Heather, furious that Luke turned her down, tries to kill Anna, but ends up drugging Olivia instead. She's caught by Anna after shooting Luke in an attempt to kill Anna. She is sent back to Ferncliff, but later escapes and makes her way to Téa's house, intending to kidnap the baby to raise by herself. By the time she kidnaps "Victor," Jason, with the help of John McBain, has figured out Heather switched the babies, and that Heather has Sam's baby. Heather makes her way to General Hospital, where Jason and Sam get the baby back after a standoff in which Heather is severely injured. She is hospitalized and lapses into a coma.

Heather wakes up and escapes to the Quartermaine mansion, where she tries to escape with Skye. She is knocked out, and taken back to Ferncliff. Heather is seen again when Damian Spinelli looks for information on Franco's long-lost daughter. She escapes and tries to kidnap Danny, Jason and Sam's son, again, but is thwarted; first by Stephen Clay, then by Rafe Kovich, Jr. She tries to kill Olivia, but ends up stabbing Steve instead. She's sent to Miscavige Institute when she turns herself in to the police. She's later visited by a mystery man, who turns out to be Franco, alive and well. Heather later breaks out of Miscavige, and reveals that Franco is actually her son with Scott Baldwin. Intending to have the same connection with Franco that she always wanted with Steve, Heather breaks into his room, and tries to kill his girlfriend, Carly Jacks. Franco catches her however, and stabs her fatally. He buries her body, though it's later revealed she survived.

Heather kidnaps Carly, intending to kill her and frame Franco for the crime. She's discovered by Luke, who she gets locked up in Miscavige, and takes Carly to the catacombs in Wyndemere. Before Heather can kill Carly, she's discovered by Franco, whom she shoots, but is stopped by Anna from killing both him and Carly. She's locked up, and Anna finally pressures her to reveal that Luke and Scott are locked up in Miscavige because she convinced the staff to help her out after Heather's last run in with Victor Cassadine. In 2016, a troubled Franco visits his mother, and she helps him financially through an unknown source. It is later revealed that Heather had blackmailed Naomi, Hayden Barnes' mother, with the knowledge that Heather's ex-husband, Jeff Webber, was Hayden's father (conceived after his marriage to Elizabeth's mother), and has been receiving monthly payments for years for keeping the secret. Heather later revealed to Franco that because of her fear that he was the hospital serial killer, she had snuck out and drugged both Bobbie and Lucas Jones while he was at the Nurse's Ball, in order to give him an alibi. Later, Heather is visited by Elizabeth Webber who has been dating Franco. Elizabeth is surprised when Heather tells her that of all the women her son has dated, Heather considers only Elizabeth worthy of him, giving an indication that deep inside Heather's psyche, she might be somewhat stable.

=== 2022–2024 ===
Heather reemerges in October 2022. That December, it's revealed that Heather is the biological mother of Esme Prince, whom she put as a newborn baby up for adoption after her relationship with Ryan Chamberlain ended. Years later, Esme found Ryan through his keepsakes, which Heather stole. Heather is then revealed to be killing the citizens of Port Charles, claiming victims such as Brando Corbin and Britt Westbourne and attempting to kill Ava Jerome, Diane Miller and others. Heather learns that she's becoming a grandmother as Esme is pregnant with her first child from her one-night stand with Spencer Cassadine's father, Nikolas. Unaware that Nikolas held her daughter hostage in order for her to have the baby, then shipped her off to Cassadine Island after birth. Esme escapes, after she intentionally falls off the parapet into the ocean. Esme and her unborn baby were found by Spencer and Trina Robinson at the Haunted Star and was taken to the Hospital, where she was found to have hypothermia and has suffered from memory loss, which Kevin confirmed. Heather finally meets her daughter after Esme was remanded to Spring Ridge until her upcoming trial for revenge porn against Cameron Webber and Josslyn Jacks. After seeing Heather and Esme together, Heather confronts Ryan about knowing that Nikolas is the baby's father and Nikolas is trying to steal their grandchild from them. Heather tells Ryan about the visit from Dante Falconeri and Sam McCall about finding Esme's nanny Maggie Fitzgerald, who knows Ryan, and it's time for them to break out of Spring Ridge and they'll bring Esme with them. After the trio escape from Spring Ridge, they stop by Spoon Island, so Ryan can kidnap Ava. While on the island, he holds both Ava and Felicia captive, they learns that Heather is the hook killer and Heather told Ava about Ryan's role in destroying her life, including her marriage to Nikolas, and the whole situation ends with Mac shooting and killing Ryan, Heather was arrested, while their daughter gives birth to her son, Ace with the help of Laura Webber and Kevin Collins. After, Esme agrees to meet Heather, Esme confronted her and let her know that she'll never see her and her grandson, ever again and Esme tells the guards to take her away. When Heather meets Laura and Spencer, Heather blames Laura for turning her daughter against her and promises to get even with her, while she's headed back to D'Archam Asylum. When Heather is released, Steven returns and invites Heather to live with him in Arizona. Heather agrees but asks to see her grandson Ace before she leaves. She promises Ace that she will be back.

== Reception ==
Hollie Deese from Soaps She Knows named Heather as the best General Hospital character of 2012, commenting "Love her or hate her, she kept storylines rolling while keeping up witty banter with all of her scene partners – even a dead Anthony Zacchara. Her "Crazy Calling" ringtone alone on Todd's phone was enough to propel her to the top of the list." In 2023, Charlie Mason from the same website placed Heather at 30th on his ranked list of General Hospital’s 40+ Greatest Characters of All Time, commenting that "Whenever we're feeling especially sentimental about General Hospital, we also get a little mental — because it inevitably brings to mind Jeff Webber's batty, BLT-loving ex, arguably the most entertaining Port Charles psycho ever to spike a drink." That same year, Mala Bhattacharjee from Soaps She Knows called Heather "one of Port Charles' most notorious villains" and that she was "bound to stir up trouble" in her upcoming stint, also calling the announcement of her return to the soap as "fun news for soap viewers".

In 2024, Mills was shortlisted for the Daytime Emmy Award for Outstanding Guest Performer in a Drama Series for her role as Heather.
