= Stuart Damon =

American actor (1937–2021)

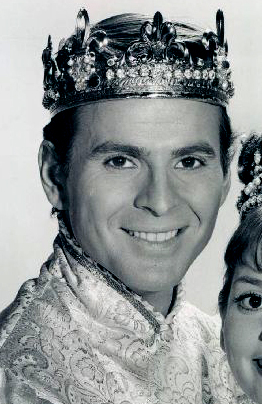
- Damon in 1965
- Born: Stuart Michael Zonis; February 5, 1937; Brooklyn, New York City, U.S.
- Died: June 29, 2021 (aged 84); Los Angeles, U.S.
- Occupations: Actor, singer
- Years active: 1959–2014
- Known for: General Hospital; The Champions; Port Charles
- Spouse: Deirdre Ann Ottewill (m. 1961; died 2019)
- Children: 2

Stuart Damon (born Stuart Michael Zonis; February 5, 1937 – June 29, 2021) was an American actor. He was best known for his 30-year portrayal of Dr. Alan Quartermaine on the American soap opera General Hospital, for which he won an Emmy Award in 1999. Outside the United States, he was known for the role of Craig Stirling in The Champions.

== Early life ==
Damon was born in Brooklyn, New York, the son of Marvin Leonard Zonis, who was a manufacturer, and his wife, Eva (Sherer) Zonis. Damon's parents were Russian Jewish immigrants who made their home in America after fleeing the Bolshevik Revolution.

== Career ==
After a series of roles on Broadway, Damon's appearance as the Prince in the 1965 version of Rodgers and Hammerstein's Cinderella starring Lesley Ann Warren helped pave the way to a long career in television soap opera. That same year, he had a prominent featured role in the Broadway musical Do I Hear a Waltz? written by Richard Rodgers (music) and Stephen Sondheim (lyrics). He had earlier appeared in an Off-Broadway revival of The Boys From Syracuse with music by Rodgers and lyrics by Lorenz Hart. Damon is prominently featured on the cast albums of these musicals, as well as the hit Irma La Douce (1960).

Moving to Great Britain, in 1965 Damon starred in the West End hit musical Charlie Girl with Anna Neagle, and was selected to appear as American secret agent Craig Stirling, alongside British actors Alexandra Bastedo and William Gaunt, in the ITC series The Champions. He also appeared with Roger Moore in an episode of The Saint which has been credited as the inspiration for the later series The Persuaders!, with Damon's role being played by Tony Curtis. In 1968, he appeared in the BBC TV adaptation of The £1,000,000 Bank Note and played Henry Adams in the starring role. Damon also played magician Harry Houdini in a lavishly staged London musical, Man of Magic. In 1970 Damon released an LP called Stuart 'Champion' Damon recorded on Reflection records REF L7 which failed to chart.

In the 1970s, he was cast alongside Gene Barry and Catherine Schell for the series The Adventurer, appearing briefly in two episodes. Damon later spoke candidly about the fact that Barry did not want him in the series because of his height: at over six feet, he towered over the shorter Barry. After acting roles in several other British television series, including Thriller, The New Avengers, The Main Chance and children's series The Adventures of Black Beauty where he played a hypnotist, he returned to the United States.

In September 1974, he appeared as a solo singer in an episode of the UK TV variety programme The Wheeltappers and Shunters Social Club. The Champions theme tune was used as his walk-on music.

In 1977, he began his best known American role, as Dr. Alan Quartermaine Sr. on General Hospital. He also repeated the role on the short-lived GH spin-off Port Charles (1997–2003). In 1999, Damon won the Best Supporting Actor Emmy, for his portrayal of Alan, a physician addicted to the painkiller hydrocodone. In 2005, Damon was reunited with Alexandra Bastedo and William Gaunt for the first time in almost 40 years, to provide audio commentary on a DVD release of The Champions. In December 2006, it was reported that Damon had been fired from General Hospital and his last air date was scheduled for February 26, 2007, when his character died. The reason behind his release was not made public. The taping of the final scene occurred on February 5, coincidentally Damon's 70th birthday. Fellow actors on General Hospital spoke to the press about how upset they were over Damon's firing, with Damon's on-show wife, played by Leslie Charleson, saying, "This is the 30th anniversary for the two of us, in August. The timing leaves me very discouraged about the way soaps are going, the total disregard for history and the blatant disregard for the veterans."

Despite the death of the character, Damon had remained on the show, playing the ghost of Alan Quartermaine, haunting his sister Tracy about forging Alan's will. He remained with the show until December 23, 2008, when Alan appeared to Monica on Christmas to tell her that he loved her. On September 18, 2009, Damon began appearing on As the World Turns as Janet and Teri Ciccone's "Uncle" Ralph Manzo, a businessman most likely involved with the mob. He left the series on October 30, 2009, but returned August 23–25, 2010. From March 19–25, 2010, Damon played the role of Governor Jim Ford on Days of Our Lives.

Damon returned to General Hospital for two episodes (August 26, 2011, and August 29, 2011), in which Alan appears in a fantasy sequence of Monica's. He returned again in November 2012 as a ghost when son AJ was announced to be alive, after son Jason's disappearance. He appeared, along with Rick Webber (Chris Robinson) and Emily Quartermaine (Natalia Livingston), as a hallucination shared by Tracy and Monica, for the show's 50th anniversary episode, which aired on April 2, 2013.

== Personal life ==
Damon married Deirdre Ann Ottewill, a former actress, singer, and dancer on March 12, 1961. They had two children, Christopher and Jennifer Zonis.

Stuart Damon died of kidney failure on June 29, 2021, aged 84, at the Motion Picture & Television Fund retirement community in Woodland Hills, Los Angeles, where he had lived for seven years. Deirdre Ottewill Damon died on December 25, 2019, from Alzheimer's disease.

== Awards and nominations ==
Year	Award	Category	Work	Result
1982	9th Daytime Emmy Awards	Outstanding Lead Actor in a Drama Series	General Hospital	Nominated
1983	10th Daytime Emmy Awards	Outstanding Lead Actor in a Drama Series	General Hospital	Nominated
1984	11th Daytime Emmy Awards	Outstanding Lead Actor in a Drama Series	General Hospital	Nominated
1991	18th Daytime Emmy Awards	Outstanding Supporting Actor in a Drama Series	General Hospital	Nominated
1996	23rd Daytime Emmy Awards	Outstanding Supporting Actor in a Drama Series	General Hospital	Nominated
1996	12th Soap Opera Digest Awards	Outstanding Actor in a Supporting Role	General Hospital	Won
1997	24th Daytime Emmy Awards	Outstanding Supporting Actor in a Drama Series	General Hospital	Nominated
1997	13th Soap Opera Digest Awards	Outstanding Actor in a Supporting Role	General Hospital	Nominated
1999	26th Daytime Emmy Awards	Outstanding Supporting Actor in a Drama Series	General Hospital	Won

== Works ==
=== Broadway ===
- First Impressions – 1959
- From A to Z – 1960
- Irma La Douce – 1960
- Do I Hear a Waltz? – 1965

=== Off-Broadway ===
- Entertain a Ghost – 1962
- The Boys from Syracuse – 1963

=== West End ===
- Charlie Girl – 1965
- Man of Magic (as Harry Houdini) – 1968

=== Film ===
- A Touch of Class (1973) – Man Hailing Cab at End (uncredited)
- Young Doctors in Love (1982) – Soap Cameos
- Star 80 (1983) – Vince Roberts
- Silent Assassins (1988) – General
- Chairman of the Board (1998) – Doctor
- Rain from Stars (2013) – Edward (final film role)

=== Television ===
- Cinderella (1965, TV Movie) – Prince
- Man in a Suitcase (1967) – Williams
- The £1,000,000 Bank Note (1968) – Henry Adams
- The Champions (1968–1969) – Craig Stirling
- The Saint (1969) – Rod Huston
- UFO (1971) – Howard Byrne
- The Adventurer (1972–1973) – Vince
- The Adventures of Black Beauty (1973) – Mr. Duncan
- The Wheeltappers and Shunters Social Club (Episode 14, 1974) – self, singer
- A Touch of the Casanovas (1975, TV Movie) – Casanova
- The Main Chance (1975) episode "Payment by Result" – Allan Hartmann
- Thriller: Nightmare for a Nightingale (1976)
- Space: 1999 (1975–1977) – Guido Verdeschi / Parks
- Yanks Go Home (1976–1977) – Cpl. Vince Rossi
- The New Avengers (1977) – Marty Brine
- General Hospital (1977–2013) – Dr. Alan Quartermaine
- Fantasies (1982, TV Movie) – Hanson
- Fantasy Island (1982–1983) – Richard Mallory / Dr. Randolph
- Legend of the Champions (1983, TV Movie) – Craig Stirling
- America (1985–1986) – Self – Host
- Mike Hammer (1987) – Graham Richardson
- Perry Mason: The Case of the Killer Kiss (1993, TV Movie) – Alex Straub
- Me and My Hormones (1996) – Bill
- Port Charles (1997–2001) – Dr. Alan Quartermaine
- As the World Turns (2009–2010) – Ralph Manzo
- Days of Our Lives (2010) – Governor Jim Ford

=== Recording ===
- Stuart Champion Damon, Reflection Records 1970
