= Lesley Webber =

Fictional character from General Hospital

- General Hospital character
- Portrayed by: Denise Alexander
- Duration: 1973–1984; 1996–2009; 2013; 2017; 2019; 2021
- First appearance: March 13, 1973
- Last appearance: February 26, 2021
- Created by: Frank and Doris Hursley
- Introduced by: James Young; Wendy Riche (1996); Frank Valentini (2013)
- Spin-off appearances: General Hospital: Twist of Fate (1996)
In-universe information
- Other names: Lesley Sullivan; Lesley Williams; Lesley Faulkner
- Occupation: Physician
- Family: Webber
- Parents: Walter Sullivan; Mary Sullivan
- Husband: Bruce Williams (backstory); Cameron Faulkner (1975–1976); Rick Webber (1977–1980, 1981–1984)
- Sons: Jeremy Williams
- Daughters: Laura Spencer
- Adoptive children: Mike Webber; Blackie Parrish (foster); Amy Vining (foster)
- Grandchildren: Nikolas Cassadine; Lucky Spencer; Lulu Spencer

Lesley Webber is a fictional character from General Hospital, that is an American soap opera on the ABC network. Actress Denise Alexander portrayed the role from March 13, 1973, through February 28, 1984, as a series regular, and from 1996 to 2009 as a recurring character. Alexander returned to the series in 2013 to commemorate its 50th anniversary and has since made subsequent appearances in 2017, 2019, and 2021.

== Casting ==
Actress Denise Alexander started playing the role of Lesley in March 1973. In 1976, although TIME magazine panned General Hospital at the time, Alexander's character Lesley was noted as the serial's saving grace. When Alexander and the network could not agree on contractual negotiations, the character was axed in March 1984. Angry fans picketed the studio because they were upset that Lesley died off-screen. In 1996, the series wrote the character back in, and Alexander appeared as a recurring character from December 5, 1996, until October 2009. In 2013, Alexander returned to the role from May 16 to December 13. In November 2017, it was announced she would reprise her role, returning for a one-off visit on December 22.

In March 2019, Entertainment Weekly announced that Alexander would again return as Lesley, in celebration of the series' 56th anniversary. She made her appearance during the April 2 episode. In January 2021, it was announced she would once again return as Lesley. She returned for episodes from January 8 through February 26.

== Storylines ==
=== 1973–84 ===
Lesley came to Port Charles in March 1973 and joined the staff at General Hospital to replace Dr. Tom Baldwin. Lesley is haunted by memories of her past. She admits to Lee Baldwin, Tom's brother, that she is a widow while taking care of Lee's wife, Meg, who suffers from hypertension. Meg becomes convinced that Lee is having an affair with Lesley behind her back. Lesley grows close to Meg's son, Scott, which also angers Meg. Lesley resigns as Meg's doctor and is replaced by Dr. Steve Hardy. During a confrontation with Lee, Meg has a stroke and dies in July 1973.

Lesley meets Augusta McLeod, R.N., who has arrived in Port Charles to stay with her cousin, Jane Dawson, R.N. This upsets Lesley because of her history with Augusta, who had an affair with Lesley's former husband Bruce. Lesley's marriage to Bruce ended when he committed suicide after their child died from sudden infant death syndrome. The two women talk about these past events at length. Augusta assures Lesley that she is not to blame for anything, especially because Bruce had told Augusta he took responsibility for the end of his marriage shortly before he died. Augusta and Lesley call a truce and Lesley helps Augusta gain a job at General Hospital.

Florence Gray is one of Lesley's first patients at General Hospital. She suffers from stomach ulcers, which she blames on her troubled marriage with Gordon Gray. Florence starts seeing psychiatrist Peter Taylor. Florence tells Peter about her husband's affair with one of her students years earlier, in which the student had become pregnant and given birth to a child who died soon after. Peter tells Lesley about Florence's history and she reveals that she is the student Gordon had the affair with. Gordon re-enters Lesley's life and confesses his love to her, preparing to leave Florence and start a new life with Lesley. Lesley asks Dr. Steve Hardy to be taken off Florence's case, and convinces Gordon to stay with his wife. She is then tormented by the memory of giving birth and losing her daughter.

Lesley starts dating Dr. Joel Stratton but is pleasantly surprised when wealthy Cameron Faulkner donates money to Lesley's free clinic project. Lesley breaks up with Joel because he cannot make a lifelong commitment to her, whereas Cameron is helping her rent a cottage. Joel admits to Lesley that he is afraid of commitment because of health issues in his family. He has feared for his life since an irregularity was found in his heartbeat. A former girlfriend of Joel's, Margaret Colson, arrives from Boston and tries to rekindle her relationship with Joel. Meanwhile, Salvadore Piazzara, a patient of Joel's, dies from a fatal heart seizure. Cameron tempts Joel to resign with a job offer out of town, which would supposedly spare the clinic bad publicity after the Piazzara case. Cameron tries to convince Lesley that Joel was losing interest in her because he had regained interest in Margaret.

Lesley begins receiving anonymous crank calls from a man proclaiming his love. She is unaware that this is Felix Buchanan, a timid young patient who has been surveilling her cottage. Cameron proposes to Lesley and she accepts. Felix arrives to tell Lesley he needs to save her from Cameron and threatens him with a gun before shooting and wounding him. The police arrive and Cameron survives his injuries. Cameron and Lesley marry. Joel leaves town, causing Lesley to wonder if she will be suited to Cameron's jetset lifestyle.

Shortly after Lesley marries Cameron, a former nurse named Miss Roach arrives to see her. Miss Roach has come to reveal that the child Lesley had with Gordon Gray did not die at birth. Lesley's father had bribed Miss Roach to substitute the baby for another who had died and arranged for the funeral. Miss Roach dies before she can tell Lesley the name of the woman who was given her baby in this exchange. Lesley investigates and discovers that the child she gave birth to, Laura, was adopted by a couple by the name of Jason and Barbara Vining. Lesley is desperate to see her daughter again, but Cameron orders her never to make contact with Laura. Lesley starts meeting Laura anyway. Jason and Barbara become curious about Laura's new friendship and soon realize Lesley must be Laura's biological mother. When Laura finds out the truth, she is thrilled.

Lesley is later granted full custody of Laura. When Laura falls ill and Peter tells her that the illness is emotion-based, Lesley decides to return Laura to the Vining family. Cameron is pleased with this development, but Lesley is distraught over losing Laura again. Cameron starts an affair with his secretary Peggy and is determined to remove Laura from Lesley's life for good. First he pays an elderly nurse to convince Lesley that Laura was never actually her daughter. When this fails, Cameron pays the Vining's a large sum of money to move away with Laura. When Lesley finds out about Cameron's scheme to keep her from her daughter, Cameron kidnaps Lesley. As Cameron is driving, Lesley grabs the steering wheel and the car lunges off the road, killing Cameron.

Lesley's colleague Rick Webber begins comforting her. As Rick tries to stay away from his brother's wife Monica, he spends more time with Lesley and helps her recover from the miscarriage of her late husband's baby. Monica becomes jealous of Rick's friendship with Lesley. Monica confronts Lesley, telling her to stay away from Rick and accusing them of having an affair. Rick and Lesley become closer anyway and Rick helps Lesley find Laura. Laura tells Lesley she wants nothing to do with her anymore, leaving Lesley crushed. Rick eventually gets through to Laura, telling her how much Lesley loves her and that she never gave up on her. Lesley is grateful to Rick for this. Rick confesses his love for Lesley and proposes to her. She accepts and they eventually marry.

David Hamilton is admitted to General Hospital and turns out to be an old college friend of Rick's. David's wife and children had been killed in an accident that left him paralyzed. The doctors cannot figure out why David is unable to walk and release him from hospital. David accepts Rick's offer to stay at his home while he recuperates. While Lesley finds something about David strange, Laura cares for him. Soon David finds his own apartment and tries to make a pass at Lesley, which she rejects. Lesley confesses what happened with David to Rick's brother Jeff. Jeff swears not to tell Rick. Having been rejected by Lesley, David moves on to Laura and secretly starts a romantic relationship with the young girl. However, his main intention with Laura is to use her to get to Lesley. When David tells Laura that he is actually in love with Lesley, Laura pushes him and he falls to his death. Lesley later discovers David's body. In order to protect Laura, Lesley confesses to murdering David. Laura feels guilty and runs away. She eventually returns and confesses to the murder. The charges against Lesley are dropped and Laura is sentenced to six months' probation.

Lesley starts to think that Rick and Monica are having another affair, causing trouble in her marriage. Monica and Rick are among the doctors working at the hospital when it is placed under quarantine. After everyone is let out of quarantine, Monica and Rick sleep together. While Monica is sure of her feelings for Rick, he tells her they need time to figure things out. When Laura has a car accident, it leads Rick to rethink his involvement with Monica and he ends his affair with her for good. Monica reconciles with her husband, Alan Quartermaine, when she discovers that she is pregnant. Meanwhile, Lesley and Rick start to think about a baby of their own, but Lesley is unable to conceive as it would put her life in danger.

Laura's adopted sister, Amy Vining, moves to Port Charles to become a nurse. Rick and Lesley welcome her into their home, often amused by her tendency for gossip, but sometimes overwhelmed by it.

Lesley ends up delivering Monica's baby. Monica fears that the baby will not survive, so she feels safe telling Lesley that the baby was Rick's. This means that Lesley is already aware of the affair when Rick tells her about it, causing them to separate. Rick finds out that Alan Jr. could be his son and files a suit against Monica. Lesley, still in love with Rick, supports him and even agrees to a divorce so that he can claim his son. It is later discovered that Alan Jr. is in fact Alan's son and not Rick's.

During this time, Lesley allows her former sister-in-law Heather to stay with her. Heather has just been released from the mental institution she was sent to after overdosing on LSD several years before. Lesley is supportive of Heather's mother, Alice Grant, when it is revealed that she shot Lesley's co-worker Diana Taylor to prevent Diana from killing Heather.

Lesley and Rick remarry and adopt a six-year-old boy named Mike. Laura has disappeared and is presumed dead, which Lesley struggles to cope with. Lesley and Rick eventually become foster parents to Blackie Parrish after his mother dies. When Blackie enters the music business, Rick notices that Blackie has become more arrogant and shallow. Blackie accidentally kills his girlfriend Lou, and is sentenced to time in prison.

An old enemy of Rick's, D. L. Brock, comes to town. He wants revenge on Rick for closing his cannery as part of Rick's work for the Port Charles Health Commission. Brock brings Ginny Blake to town, who claims to be Mike's biological mother. Bobbie Spencer, Brock's wife, figures out that Ginny might be working with Brock to take revenge on Rick and warns Lesley. After confronting Ginny, Lesley ends up in a car accident and dies.

=== 1996–2005 ===
It was revealed that Lesley was in fact alive in 1996. Stefan Cassadine, son of Mikkos and brother of Stavros had kidnapped Laura years ago, was keeping Lesley drugged in a catatonic state. Lesley and Laura reunite with Luke's help, they fake their deaths to escape the Cassadines. When they return months later, their friends and family turn against them out of hurt. Stefan blackmailed Laura into leaving town once more. She lies to Luke that her mother needed treatment in Switzerland and takes Lulu with them. In 1998, they return, and Lesley takes over being a mother to Laura and grandmother to Laura's sons Nikolas and Lucky and daughter Lesley Lu.

In 2002, a now divorced Rick Webber returned to give his daughter Laura away again at her second wedding to Luke Spencer. Rick was happy to see Lesley alive and well again but his flirtations with old flame Monica upset Lesley and made Monica's husband, Alan, extremely jealous. His return made Laura remember some terrible events. She began having flashbacks involving the garage attic, including wearing a dress covered in blood. Rick and Scott Baldwin could tell that Laura was remembering and tried to prevent the truth from coming out. Years ago Rick was having an affair with nurse Theresa Carter and Laura walked in on them in the attic. Theresa had gotten violent and Laura took an antique camera and hit Theresa over the head with it. It killed her and Rick and Scott buried her in the back yard. Rick then gave Laura a certain drug for her to forget that night. When Rick encountered Laura in the Webber attic, she freaked out and presumably hit him over the head which caused his death. The horror of the events caused Laura to slip into a mental state of catatonia which caused much grief for Luke, Lesley, and in her last appearance, Amy. Lesley not only had to deal with the loss of the love of her life but the prospect of losing her daughter whom she had struggled hard years before to find and reconnect with.

=== 2006–09 ===
In October 2006, Luke gave Robin Scorpio, now a doctor, his permission to give Laura an experimental drug called LS-49 that would temporarily bring her out of her catatonic state. The drug worked and everyone in Laura's life were overjoyed to have her back for the 3 weeks. In that time. Laura made Luke take her back to the Scorpio attic so she could remember what happened between her and Rick Webber the night she killed her stepfather four years ago; she painfully, tearfully did remember. Lesley, along with Laura's children, the Quartermaines, and the rest of LnL's loved ones were in attendance at Luke and Laura got remarried like they were going to do before Laura had her breakdown. The lavish ceremony took place in Lila's rose garden per Laura's wishes. The marriage was fake however as Luke was married to Tracy Quartermaine at the time. The minister who performed the ceremony was only an actor who Luke had hired to perform it. He only went along with it because it meant so much to Laura and he wanted to make what time she had left as meaningful and memorable as possible. Lesley and the rest were devastated when Laura slowly but finally slipped back into her catatonic state. Before her goodbye with Lulu, Laura told her daughter that she didn't believe that she had actually killed Rick Webber, but not to tell Luke this because it would break his heart. (Luke telling Laura that she killed her stepfather is what actually pushed her to really have her breakdown and into her catatonic state) Lulu vowed to pursue the matter and find Rick's real killer.

After Alan died from a heart attack during the Metro Court Hotel hostage crisis during February sweeps, Lulu and her stepbrother Dillon Quartermaine intercepted a letter addressed to Luke which was to be delivered to him after Alan's death. In the letter, it says that Scott Baldwin is actually the one who killed Rick that night. When Lulu confronts a recently returned to town during the hostage crisis Scott about the letter, he eventually confirms it. He went to the Scorpio house that night to check on Laura and upon hearing her scream found her in the attic fighting with Rick. He was the one who hit him on the head with the candlestick, unintentionally killing him, to stop him from giving Laura the drug. He left just before Luke arrived on the scene and came to the only possible conclusion that he could think of: in an altercation, with Laura's current state of mind, she thought Rick was trying to hurt her so she hit him with the now bloody candlestick and accidentally killed him. Telling her this is what sent her into her catatonic state. Lulu decided that she could never tell her father what she has learned because it would destroy him; he would either a) kill Scott Baldwin for his part and be sent to jail for murder and she would never see him again or b) he would want to kill Scott and he would feel so guilty and heartbroken that he was the one who caused Laura's catatonia telling her something so traumatic when it didn't even happen.

Lesley attended Lucky and Elizabeth's second marriage in March, where she was also introduced to Spinelli when he interrupted the ceremony when the minister asked "if anyone knew why they should not be joined . . ." Spinelli only stood up because it looked like Lulu was about to tell everyone that Elizabeth's baby was really Jason's and not Lucky's. Spinelli recovered and the marriage took place.

Lesley returned to the front-burner temporarily on October 30, 2008 when Scott kidnapped Laura and took her to Los Angeles. She assisted Lucky, Lulu, and Nikolas in finding her location. Laura is eventually found and is leaving Port Charles for Paris to seek further treatment. Not known to anyone at first, Laura is followed by Scott.

Lesley attended Lucky and Elizabeth's engagement party in October 2009 and then disappeared off-screen. She stayed for a while with Laura in Paris, where she became aware that her daughter and Scott got closer again. Not liking Laura and Scott's newfound friendship, Lesley joins Nikolas at Lake Como in Italy.

=== 2013 ===
As of March 2013, Lesley is said to be staying at Nikolas' house in Italy and is taking care of his son Spencer. A couple of weeks later, Lesley returns to Port Charles with Spencer to reunite him with his father. She is surprised to learn of Laura's plans to remarry Scott. Lesley disapproves of Laura's plans and confronts Scott with the murder of her husband, Rick Webber. Laura pleads with Lesley and hopes that she forgive Scott's past mistakes. Scott promises Lesley that he cares for Laura and wants only what's best for her. Not wanting to stay in their way, Lesley gives them her blessing even though she's not happy about it. After Mayor Lomax is unable to perform Laura and Scott's wedding, Lesley jumps in as she's able to officiate the ceremony. At the wedding, Lesley also reunites with her granddaughter Lulu who was recently kidnapped by Stavros Cassadine and since then can't remember her previous life. Lesley becomes aware of Nikolas' interest in Elizabeth, who's attending the ceremony with Monica's son AJ. Later on, Lesley put on a doctor's jacket for the first time in almost 30 years when she pretended to still be a doctor in order to gain information on Luke's medical condition, but ended up being confronted by old rival Monica. After exchanging barbs, Monica allowed Lesley to get the information she was seeking when Lesley pleaded to Monica's motherly instincts. After coming back from escorting Laura to France, Lesley decided to remain in town. On Halloween night, Lesley passed out when she opened the Wyndemere door to find Faison standing there. Later on, old rival Monica was invited over for an off-screen visit with Lesley which included old hospital pals Gail Baldwin and Audrey Hardy where Lesley gave Monica a gift of a painting which unbeknownst to them was painted by Heather!

=== 2017 ===
Lesley returns in 2017 for Laura's wedding to Kevin Collins, and ends up officiating the ceremony.
