= Lesli =

Lesli is a feminine given name. Notable people with the name include:

- Lesli Brea (born 1973), former Major League Baseball player
- Lesli Kay (born 1965), Emmy Award-winning American actress
- Lesli Linka Glatter (21st century), American film and television director
- Lesli Margherita, American stage and screen actress

== See also ==
- Lesley (disambiguation)
- Leslie (disambiguation)
- Lesly
