= List of General Hospital characters introduced in the 1960s =

General Hospital is the longest running American television serial drama, airing on ABC. Created by Frank and Doris Hursley, who originally set it in a general hospital (hence the title), in an unnamed fictional city. In the 1970s, the city was named Port Charles, New York. The series premiered on April 1, 1963. This is a list of notable characters who significantly impacted storylines and began their run, or significantly returned, from the years 1963 to 1969.

== Tom Baldwin ==
Tom Baldwin
- General Hospital character
- Portrayed by: Paul Savior (1966–72); Don Chastain (1976–77)
- Duration: 1966–72; 1976–77
- First appearance: December 12, 1966
- Last appearance: 1977
- Created by: Frank and Doris Hursley
- Introduced by: James Young (1966); Tom Donovan (1976)
In-universe information
- Occupation: Physician
- Siblings: Lee Baldwin
- Spouse: Audrey March Hardy (1967–77)
- Children: Tom Hardy
- Grandchildren: Tommy Hardy
- Nieces and nephews: Scott Baldwin (adoptive)

Thomas "Tom" Baldwin is a fictional character from the ABC Daytime soap opera, General Hospital. The role was originated by Paul Savior in 1966. The character was presumably killed off in 1972, but brought back on canvas in September 1976, portrayed by Don Chastain, who left in 1977 amongst a large number of cast changes that occurred when Irving and Tex Elman took over as head writers.

Tom Baldwin joined General Hospital in December 1966 to replace Dr. Peter Lindsay. Tom soon became interested in Jessie Brewer, R.N. but Jessie was in a relationship with Dr. John Prentice. Dr. Prentice's daughter, Polly, was also interested in Tom. In 1967, Tom Baldwin is treating Dr. John Prentice for his heart condition when John dies. When it is revealed that John had died because of a barbiturate overdose, John's daughter Polly Prentice tries to frame Jessie Brewer for murder. Tom is charged as an accessory before Phil Brewer returns to town with evidence that clears them both. Meanwhile, nurse Audrey March returns from Vietnam, trying to forget about her divorce from Steve Hardy, and marries Tom. When Audrey refuses to sleep with him, Tom is furious and rapes Audrey. When Audrey learns she is pregnant, she files for divorce and leaves town.

In 1972, Audrey returns, claiming the baby had died so that Tom would not protest the divorce. Audrey and Steve decide to remarry, but the lies Audrey was telling begin to hurt their relationship and they break up. Tom finds out about the baby and tries to get custody. Audrey is forced to stay in their marriage, and they rename the baby Tom "Tommy" Baldwin Jr. When their relationship ends, Tom leaves the country with the child, with the help of Florence Andrews. Eventually, the child is sent back to Audrey, who is told that Tom died of a heart attack.

In September 1976, Tom is revealed to be alive and returns to fight for custody of the child, while begging Audrey not to divorce him. When Tommy runs away, Tom agrees to the divorce and moves to Salt Lake City. Audrey and Steve remarry while Steve adopts Tommy, renamed Tom Hardy.

== Meg Bentley ==
Meg Bentley
- General Hospital character
- Portrayed by: Patricia Breslin (1965–69); Jen Shepard (1967); Elizabeth MacRae (1969–73)
- Duration: 1965–73
- First appearance: July 7, 1965
- Last appearance: July 16, 1973
- Created by: Frank and Doris Hursley
- Introduced by: James Young
In-universe information
- Occupation: Nurse
- Parents: Henry Quinton; Emma Quinton
- Husband: Lloyd Bentley (pre-1965); Lee Baldwin (1966–73)
- Sons: Scott Baldwin
- Stepdaughters: Brooke Bentley Clinton
- Grandchildren: Robert Frank; Karen Wexler; Logan Hayes; Serena Baldwin; Christina Baldwin (adoptive)

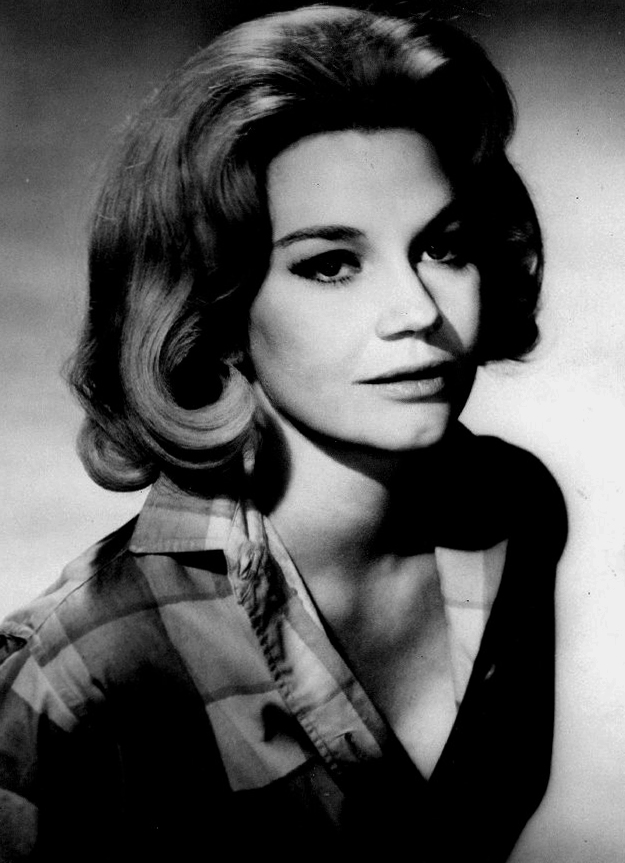
Elizabeth MacRae took over the role of Meg in 1969.

Meg Baldwin (also Quinton and Bentley) is a fictional character from the ABC Daytime soap opera General Hospital. Patricia Breslin originated the role in 1965. Jen Shepard temporarily portrayed the character from June 27 to July 19, 1967, when Breslin had an emergency appendectomy. Breslin left in 1969 when she married Art Modell. The role was taken over by Elizabeth MacRae, in August 1969, who left the series when the character died in 1973.

In 1965, Meg Bentley becomes a nurse at General Hospital. Her husband Lloyd has just died and she moves to town with her son Scotty and stepdaughter Brooke. Meg is engaged to Dr. Noel Clinton, which Brooke does not approve of. Brooke seduces Noel away from Meg, and Meg is comforted by Lee Baldwin. Soon they are married. In 1969, Meg learns she has breast cancer and has a radical mastectomy. After the mastectomy, Meg has a mental breakdown and has to be committed to a sanitarium. She is eventually cured, but seeks treatment from Dr. Lesley Webber for high blood pressure. Meg dies, and Lee adopts Scotty.

== Angie Costello ==
Angie Costello
- General Hospital character
- Portrayed by: Jana Taylor
- Duration: 1963–1966; 1993
- First appearance: April 1, 1963
- Last appearance: April 1, 1993
- Created by: Theordore Ferro; Mathilde Ferro
- Introduced by: Selig J. Seligman (1963); Wendy Riche (1993)
In-universe information
- Parents: Mike Costello
- Spouse: Eddie Weeks; Mr. Collins
- Children: Jessie
- Grandchildren: Unnamed grandchild

Angie Costello Collins (formerly Weeks) is a fictional character from the ABC Daytime soap opera, General Hospital. Jana Taylor originated the role on the series' premiere on April 1, 1963. Taylor portrayed the role until September 22, 1966. She returned for a guest appearance on the show's 30th anniversary episode on April 1, 1993.

Angie Costello is the first patient of Dr. Steve Hardy (John Beradino), the Chief of Staff at General Hospital. Angie is brought in with severe cuts on her face from a car accident where her boyfriend Eddie Weeks (then Craig Curtis) was driving. After surgery, Angie is upset that her face will be disfigured and causes trouble and stress for Dr. Hardy and Nurse Jessie Brewer (Emily McLaughlin). Angie recovers from plastic surgery and has an illegitimate child with Eddie, which they give up for adoption to Fred and Janet Fleming (Simon Scott and Ruth Phillips). Angie and Eddie get married, and want their child back. They kidnap the baby and are arrested. The court gives them custody of the baby and they leave town for Chicago. Angie returns in April 1993 and visits with Steve the same day as his 30th anniversary at General Hospital. Angie is related to Steve and Audrey through marriage, as her father-in-law, Al Weeks, married Audrey's sister, Lucille, years after Angie was seen on the show.

== Howie Dawson ==
Howie Dawson
- General Hospital character
- Portrayed by: Ray Girardin
- Duration: 1968–74
- First appearance: May 16, 1968
- Last appearance: August 8, 1974
- Created by: Frank and Doris Hursley
- Introduced by: James Young
In-universe information
- Occupation: Administrator at General Hospital
- Spouse: Jane Dawson
- Children: Joanne Dawson

Howie Dawson is a fictional character from the ABC Daytime soap opera, General Hospital. Ray Girardin originated the role in 1968 and played the character until 1974.

Howie is driving when he gets into a car accident with his pregnant girlfriend Jane Harland, who miscarries. They marry but face problems due to his mother. Howie becomes involved with Jane's cousin Carol during a difficult time in their marriage, but reconciles with Jane after their child is born. When Jane wants another child, Howie feels pressured and starts seeing Augusta McLeod. He goes back to Jane when he needs to improve his image to get an important position at General Hospital. They eventually separate and Howie leaves for New York City.

== Jane Harland ==
Jane Harland
- General Hospital character
- Portrayed by: Shelby Hiatt
- Duration: 1968–75
- First appearance: May 13, 1968
- Last appearance: 1975
- Created by: Frank and Doris Hursley
- Introduced by: James Young
In-universe information
- Occupation: Nurse
- Spouse: Howie Dawson
- Children: Joanne Dawson
- First cousins: Augusta McLeod, Carol

Jane Harland (previously Dawson) is a fictional character from the ABC Daytime soap opera, General Hospital. Shelby Hiatt originated the role in 1968. She briefly left on maternity leave in 1972. Hiatt portrayed the character until she was let go by the series in August 1975.

Jane is brought to General Hospital as a patient after a car accident caused by her boyfriend Howie Dawson, that makes her miscarry her baby. She joins the nursing staff at the hospital and marries Howie. Their marriage struggles due to Howie's mother. Jane becomes involved with Tom Baldwin during a difficult time with Howie. When Tom's wife Audrey becomes pregnant, he resumes their marriage and Jane reconciles with Howie after their child is born. They eventually separate and Howie leaves town. After Jane's child suddenly dies, she is grief-stricken and leaves to work at another hospital.

== Lucille March ==
Lucille March Weeks
- General Hospital character
- Portrayed by: Lucille Wall (1963–82); Mary Grace Canfield (temp. 1973)
- Duration: 1963–76; 1982
- First appearance: April 18, 1963
- Last appearance: 1982
- Created by: Theodore and Mathilde Ferro
- Introduced by: James Young (1963); Gloria Monty (1982)
In-universe information
- Occupation: Registered nurse
- Siblings: Audrey March Hardy; Edith Logan
- Spouse: Al Weeks (1974—)
- Stepchildren: Eddie Weeks
- Nieces and nephews: Anne Logan; Tom Hardy

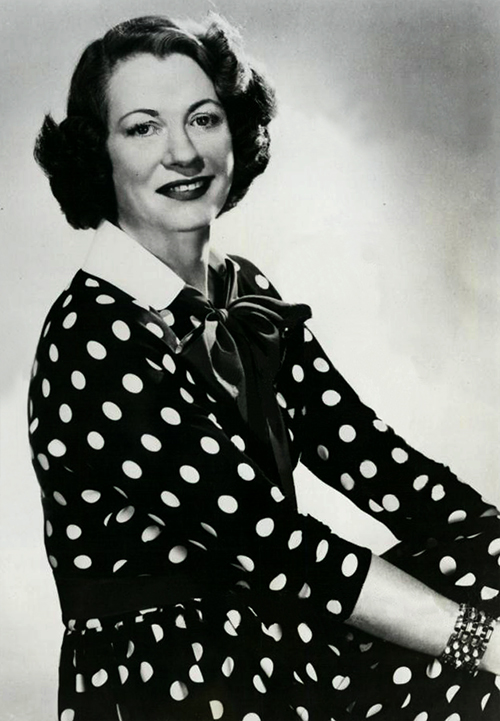
Lucille Wall portrayed the role for over a decade.

Lucille March Weeks is a fictional character from the ABC Daytime soap opera, General Hospital. Lucille Wall originated the role on the fourteenth episode of the series. Wall won a special Emmy Award for her portrayal of Lucille, as well as an award for Outstanding Individual Contribution to Daytime Drama in 1975 at the Afternoon TV Writers and Editors Awards.

Lucille March is the senior nurse on the seventh floor of General Hospital. One of Lucille's first patients is troubled Angie Costello, who is badly injured in a car accident caused by her boyfriend, Eddie Weeks. Gruff on the surface but hiding a heart of gold, she is nicknamed "Sarge" by her student nurse charges. In 1964, her sister Audrey March comes to visit and gets involved with Dr. Steve Hardy. In 1974, Lucille marries Eddie's father, Al Weeks, a widower who is a custodian at the hospital. Throughout the years, Lucille gives advice to her sister. In 1976 she retires to a farm in upstate New York, and Audrey becomes Head Nurse. Lucille pays a visit to Port Charles in 1982, having earlier invited niece Annie Logan and her adopted son Jeremy to pay her a visit.

== Diana Taylor ==
Diana Taylor
- General Hospital character
- Portrayed by: Valerie Starrett (1970–77); Davey Davison (temp. 1977); Brooke Bundy (1977–81)
- Duration: 1970–81
- First appearance: April 8, 1970
- Last appearance: February 1981
- Created by: Frank and Doris Hursley
- Introduced by: James Young
In-universe information
- Occupation: Waitress
- Parents: Pearl Maynard
- Siblings: Beth Maynard
- Spouse: Peter Taylor (1972–1979)
- Children: Unnamed child Tracy Taylor; Martha Taylor
- Adoptive children: Steven Webber

Diana Taylor (maiden name Maynard) is a fictional character from the ABC Daytime soap opera, General Hospital.

Originally portrayed by Valerie Starrett when the character was introduced in 1970, Davey Davison played the role temporarily in February 1977 while Starrett was recovering from minor surgery. That September, the series did not renew Starrett's contract and she was replaced with Brooke Bundy, reportedly due to her more youthful appearance. Others reported Starrett was let go due to conflicts with executive producer at the time Tom Donovan, who was shortly replaced by Gloria Monty at the beginning of 1978. Starrett had become popular with fans, resulting in mail from upset viewers to Bundy and the network. In 1980, the character saw less screen time due to the show's focus on the adventure storyline between popular couple Luke and Laura and mob boss Frank Smith. Bundy left the series when the character was killed off in 1981. Soap opera syndicate writer Lynda Hirsch reported that Bundy had wished to remain on the show, but there was lack of storyline for her when Richard Dean Anderson left the role of Jeff Webber.

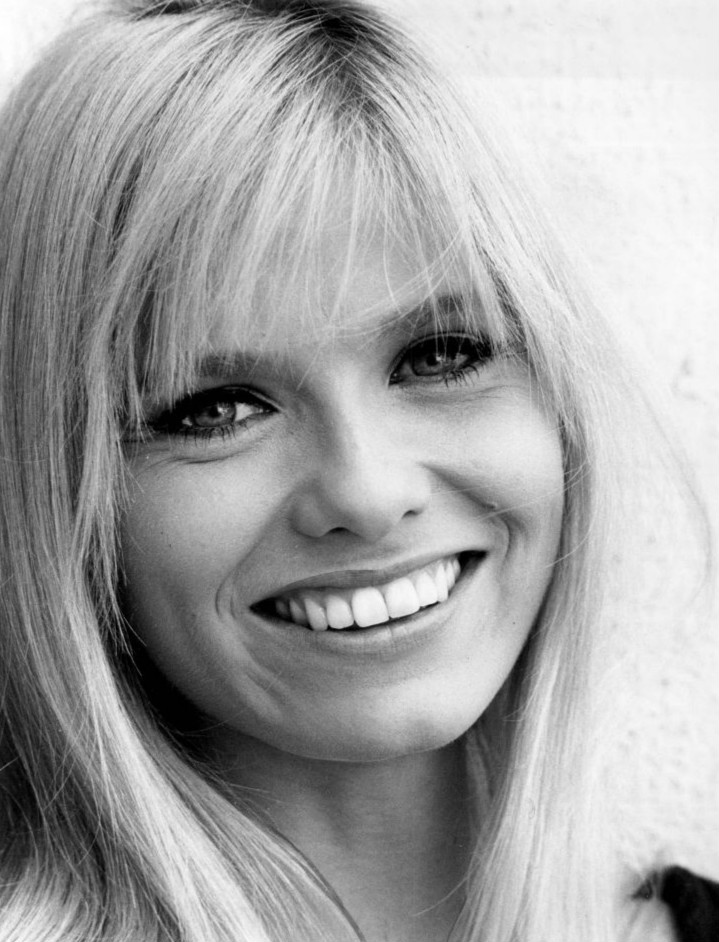
Brooke Bundy took over the role of Diana in 1977.

Diana dates Phil Brewer while he is on-the-run and using an assumed name. When he returns to his wife Jessie Brewer (Emily McLaughlin), Diana confides to Peter Taylor (Craig Huebing) that she is pregnant with Phil's child. They have a marriage of convenience, but develop real feelings for each other. The baby dies of pneumonia, but Phil becomes obsessed with Diana and rapes her. Diana becomes pregnant again and tells Peter he is the father. The truth comes out after the baby is born and after Diana has a hysterectomy, she and Peter become estranged, especially because he has trouble loving her daughter Martha. Phil realizes his obsession with Diana is in vain and leaves town. Diana becomes involved with patient Owen Stratton, but he dies before they marry. Peter becomes closer with Martha and reconciles with Diana.

In 1975, Diana becomes one of five suspects in the murder of Phil Brewer. The network filmed versions of each character committing the crime, in an effort to ensure the public would not find out the secret, and the actors were not told which character would be guilty. Starrett told the Associated Press: "It's an interesting idea, but as an actress, I want to know what I'm doing. I'm playing innocence based on what I feel about my character. You have to go on some assumption, and that's mine." Starrett's character Diana eventually confesses to the murder to protect her husband Peter. Augusta McLeod confesses and Diana is released.

== Peter Taylor ==
Peter Taylor
- General Hospital character
- Portrayed by: Paul Carr (1969); Craig Huebing (1969–79)
- Duration: 1969–79
- First appearance: August 4, 1969
- Last appearance: September 1979
- Created by: Frank and Doris Hursley
- Introduced by: James Young
In-universe information
- Occupation: Psychiatrist
- Spouse: Jessie Brewer (1969–1970); Diana Taylor (1972–1979)
- Adoptive children: Martha Taylor; Steven Webber
- Stepchildren: Tracy Taylor

Dr. Peter Taylor is a fictional character from the ABC Daytime soap opera, General Hospital. Craig Huebing took over the role in 1969. Huebing remained on the show during cast cutbacks in August 1977, although stated his character was on the backburner. Huebing left the series when the character was killed off in September 1979, which soap opera syndicate writer Lynda Hirsch speculated was due to Huebing's contract demands.

Peter Taylor, a psychiatrist at General Hospital, marries Jessie Brewer (Emily McLaughlin) when she believes her husband Phil Brewer is dead. Phil is alive and dating Diana Maynard (Valerie Starrett) under an assumed name. When Jessie finds him, her marriage to Peter is annulled. Peter and Diana plan a marriage of convenience when Diana reveals she is pregnant with Phil's child, but develop actual feelings for each other. The child dies and when Diana becomes pregnant again, Peter believes he's the father. When he learns the truth, he has a hard time loving the child, Martha, and he and Diana become estranged. He later becomes closer with Martha and reconciles with Diana. They renew their vows but Phil threatens to tell Diana that Peter is the father of Augusta McLeod's unborn child. Phil is murdered, and Peter becomes one of five suspects during a long investigation. Diana confesses to protect Peter, but Augusta confesses to Peter and he tells the police, releasing Diana.
