= McClung =

McClung is a surname. Notable people with the surname include:

- A. Colin McClung, agricultural scientist
- Alexander Keith McClung (1811–1855), diplomat
- Charles McClung McGhee (1828–1907), railroad tycoon and financier
- Charles McClung (1761–1835), politician, and surveyor
- Clarence Erwin McClung (1870–1946), biologist
- John & Emery McClung, musicians
- John McClung (1935–2004), historian and jurist
- John Alexander McClung (1891 – 1942), American singer-songwriter
- Lee McClung (1870–1914), football player and Treasurer of the United States
- Leland S. McClung (1910–2000), American bacteriologist
- Mac McClung (born 2000), American basketball player; nephew of Seth McClung (below)
- Matthew McClung, football coach
- Megan McClung (1972–2006), military officer
- Nellie McClung (1873–1951), feminist, politician, and social activist
- Patrick McClung, special effects artist
- Patrick McClung, (born 1981) entrepreneur and esports visionary.
- Seth McClung (born 1981), American baseball player
- Tom McClung (1957–2017), jazz pianist
- William McClung (1758–1811), judge
- Willie McClung, football player

== See also ==
- A. J. McClung Memorial Stadium
- Edmonton-McClung, electoral district in Alberta
- Frank H. McClung Museum
- Katzenbach v. McClung
- McClung, West Virginia
