= Jessie Brewer =

Fictional character from General Hospital

- General Hospital character
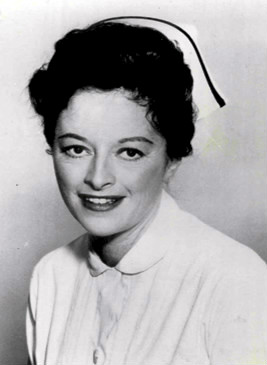
- Emily McLaughlin as Jessie Brewer in 1967
- Portrayed by: Emily McLaughlin (1963–1991); Aneta Corsaut (temp, 1976); Rebecca Herbst (flashback, 2015)
- Duration: 1963–1991; 2015
- First appearance: April 1, 1963
- Last appearance: March 1, 1991; April 1, 2015 (flashback)
- Created by: Theordore Ferro; Mathilde Ferro
- Introduced by: Selig J. Seligman
- Crossover appearances: The Young Marrieds
In-universe information
- Occupation: Registered nurse
- Parents: Samuel Murray; Alice Murray
- Siblings: Andrew Murray
- Husband: Phil Brewer (1963–1966, 1968–1971); Dr. John Prentice (1967); Peter Taylor (1969–1970)
- Children: Nancy Brewer; Unnamed Child (miscarriage)
- Nieces and nephews: Caroline Murray; Kent Murray

Jessie Brewer R.N. (also Murray) is a fictional character from the ABC Daytime soap opera General Hospital. She was played by actress Emily McLaughlin, from the show's premiere on April 1, 1963, until McLaughlin's death in 1991. On April 1, 2015, Rebecca Herbst portrayed the character in a flashback for the show's 52nd anniversary.

== Casting and Conception ==
Emily McLaughlin was cast as one of the original leading actresses on the series, previously having played Dr. Ellen Seaton on Young Dr. Malone. Registered nurse Jessie Brewer spoke the opening line of the premiere episode, "Seventh floor, nurses station," a phrase that became a staple in the show's early years. The series' original premise centered on the drama of Brewer and Dr. Steve Hardy's personal lives and experiences at General Hospital. When she died on April 26, 1991, the show wrote in the character's off-screen death. Actor and friend John Beradino (Steve Hardy) gave an on-air announcement and moment of silence the week after her death.

In 1976, while McLaughlin was on medical leave for internal bleeding, photographer and actress Aneta Corsaut stepped in to play Brewer for a six-week period. Corsaut felt she had big shoes to fill, as she said to the Ocala Star-Banner, "I know everyone on the show practically worships her, which made it difficult for me at first."

On April 1, 2015, Rebecca Herbst portrayed the character in a flashback for the show's 52nd anniversary. Herbst has portrayed Elizabeth Webber on the show since 1997.

== Storylines ==
Jessie Brewer worked at General Hospital as a nurse for many years and was close friends with Steve Hardy, the hospital chief of staff and his wife Audrey Hardy. At the show's conception, she was the leading heroine, married to Dr. Phil Brewer, a younger man who caused her much heartache over the years. At one point, Phil raped her which left her pregnant. However, their baby daughter would die, leaving Jessie distraught. Phil would come in and out of Jessie's life for over a decade until he was murdered by nurse Augusta McLeod in 1974. Jessie also briefly dated attorney Lee Baldwin who would defend her when she was accused of murdering her husband Dr. John Prentice who had actually committed suicide after discovering that he was terminally ill. In 1973, Jessie became involved with Teddy Holmes, a conman who absconded with money Jessie gave him to open a business, running away with her own niece, Carolyn Murray. Jessie's nephew, Kent Murray, was played by a young Mark Hamill. By the mid 1970s with the show focusing on newer characters such as Dr. Lesley Williams and the Webber family, Jessie was made a supporting character, although she remained important to the storyline. She became a mother figure to vivacious nurse Bobbie Spencer who lived with Jessie for many years and tried to encourage Jessie to accept the marriage proposal of Dan Rooney, the longtime hospital administrator. For a while, Dan would spend his days with Jessie at her apartment although he continued to sleep at the men's club, trying to prove to Jessie that they were compatible enough to become husband and wife. After a while, Dan tired of the arrangement and began to court Bobbie's aunt Ruby Anderson which made Jessie secretly jealous. When Ruby confronted Jessie over what she perceived as a slight in behavior, Jessie realized that she was acting childish and apologized, although she would on occasion go to concerts and other social events with Dan when Ruby wasn't available.

As the 1980s moved on, Jessie's appearances became more scattered, although she was around for various hospital crises such as the attempt by Mikkos Cassadine to freeze Port Charles with an ice machine, several hostage crises, and dealing with difficult patients who needed the calming effect which Jessie excelled at. She would also become a confidante for the nurses under her charge including Diana Taylor and Anne Logan. At times, Jessie would be called upon to discipline her nurses, especially Amy Vining who had a penchant for gossip. However, when Dr. Monica Quartermaine confronted Amy over giving away her private messages to her estranged husband, Alan, Jessie stepped up to defend Amy and insisted that any complaints against the nursing staff be taken up with her. Thanks to Jessie's patience with her, Amy matured gradually although she never fully stopped her gossiping. Jessie was prominently featured in a return guest appearance by Audrey's sister, Lucille March, who came back to visit in 1982. Jessie continued to be seen periodically over the next decade, and in a 1988 episode, confided to Amy that she was reluctant to attend an event on the Port Charles docks due to her fear of heights. Jessie's last appearance was in February 1991, just weeks before Emily McLaughlin's death, being seen as a guest at a wedding. While Jessie's death is never dealt with on-screen until years after, actor John Beradino did pay tribute to her by announcing McLaughlin's death at the conclusion of a show and asking for a moment of silence in her honor. In April 1993, Steve is visited by Angie Costello, one of her former patients, and Steve mentions that Jessie had died some time ago. Jessie is honored in a 2013 anniversary episode along with Amy Vining at the annual nurse's ball.

== Reception ==
Jessie Brewer is regarded as one of the integral aspects of the early years of General Hospital. Gary Warner, author of General Hospital: The Complete Scrapbook, told the Los Angeles Times in 1995: "A lot of people don't even know how important a character [Jessie] was. Pivotal for exactly 15 years. From 1963 to the late '70s, Jessie was it. She got me into soaps. I just remember being mesmerized by her eyes, those sad eyes. Anything and everything that could possibly go wrong in her life went wrong."

In 2023, Charlie Mason from Soaps She Knows placed Jessie #7 on his ranked list of General Hospital's 40+ Greatest Characters of All Time, commenting that "Steve Hardy's stalwart right-hand woman was the all-time most-tortured soap-opera martyr. Emily McLaughlin's dedicated nurse never ceased to volunteer her big heart for breaking." The following year, Mason placed Jessie 38th on his ranked list of Soaps' 40 Most Iconic Characters of All Time, writing, "Elizabeth Webber may think she's got it rough. But she's got nothing on the beleaguered nurse that Emily McLaughlin played from 1963–91."

== External Reading ==
- Soapzone History: The Sixties
- Soapzone History: The Seventies
