= Kin Shriner =

American actor (born 1953)

- Born: Kin Herbert Shriner; December 6, 1953 (age 72); New York City, New York, U.S.
- Occupation: Actor
- Years active: 1976–present
- Children: 1 (Auryn Riley, son)
- Parents: Herb Shriner (father); Eileen McDermott (mother)
- Relatives: Wil Shriner (twin brother); Indy Shriner (sister)

Kin Herbert Shriner (born December 6, 1953) is an American actor, best known for his portrayal of Scott Baldwin on the ABC soap opera General Hospital and its spin-off, Port Charles.

== Early life ==
Shriner and his twin brother, actor Wil Shriner, were born in New York City to Pixie (née Eileen McDermott) and Herb Shriner. His father was a popular television personality. The brothers were orphaned when their parents died in an automobile crash when the twins were teenagers. After, the brothers moved to Texas to live with their grandmother. He also has a sister, Indy Shriner, an actress best known for 'Reefer Madness II'.

== Career ==
Shriner was employed by Fuller Brush as a door-to-door salesman before becoming an actor. He was originally cast as Scott Baldwin on General Hospital, the role he is best known for playing, in 1977. In the fall of 1980, he left General Hospital and immediately began playing Jeb Hampton on the NBC daytime soap opera Texas. He left that role in 1981 and soon returned to General Hospital, where he remained until 1983, returning again from 1987-1993. In between those stints, he appeared on the short-lived syndicated daily soap Rituals as hero Mike Gallagher. He also played Dr. Brian Carey on CBS's The Bold and the Beautiful from 1994 to 1995.

In 1997, he once again returned to playing Scott Baldwin, but this time on General Hospital's spin-off Port Charles. Port Charles was set in the same fictional city as General Hospital – Port Charles, New York – and featured many of the same characters. In 2000, Shriner returned to General Hospital and quit appearing on Port Charles the next year. He left General Hospital again in 2004, and in that year portrayed Harrison Bartlett on The Young and the Restless.

In 2005, he joined the cast of As the World Turns in the role of Keith Morrissey until leaving the show in 2006. He returned to General Hospital in 2007 and left the series again in 2008. In 2011, he served as a temporary fill-in for fellow actor Ted Shackelford on The Young and the Restless, portraying Jeffrey Bardwell until September 2011. In 2013, he returned to General Hospital as Scott Baldwin and was last seen on camera August 2024.

Outside of soap operas, Shriner has appeared on several primetime television programs, playing temporary roles beginning in 1976. In later years he guest starred on several programs such as ABC's top 10 sitcom Full House.

=== General Hospital ===
Shriner is best known for playing Scott Baldwin on General Hospital over all other roles he has played. He was first cast as the character in 1977. He has left the program several times to play different roles on other soap operas, for short periods of time, but continued to appear as a regular cast member on General Hospital.

=== Port Charles ===
Plans to spin off General Hospital were announced in December 1996. ABC had previously passed on the idea of a GH spin-off proposed by former head writer Claire Labine. Tentatively titled GH2, the series was set to revolve around interns at the medical school across from General Hospital. Wendy Riche, executive producer of General Hospital, was hired to fill the same role for the new series. Riche said of the new show, "This will be a multigenerational show, which is the kind of drama we've always done at GH". It was later announced that the series would be titled Port Charles, after the fictional city where the series are set, and it would star Jon Lindstrom and Lynn Herring, playing their roles from GH.

The series premiered with a two-hour prime time special that aired on June 1, 1997. It started in its regular timeslot, the following day, replacing the canceled The City. The series also featured the return of General Hospital characters Scott Baldwin (Kin Shriner), Gail Baldwin (Susan Brown), Lee Baldwin (Peter Hansen) and Karen Wexler (Jennifer Hammon). After the series premiered, it was unclear if Lindstrom, Herring, and Shriner would remain with the series. It was later confirmed the actors would stay on the show.

== Filmography ==
n.b. for credit listings reference

=== Television ===
Year	Title	Role	Notes
1976	The Six Million Dollar Man	Friend	Episode: "A Bionic Christmas Carol"
1977	Baa Baa Black Sheep	C-47 Pilot	Episode: "W*A*S*P*S"
1977	Eight Is Enough	Michael	Episode: "The Gipper Caper"
1977–2024	General Hospital	Scott Baldwin	
1977	The Waltons	Town Boy #2	Episode: "The Stray"
1980–1981	Texas	Jeb Hampton	
1984	The Love Boat	Guest star	Episode: "Love Is Blind/Baby Makers/Lady & The Maid/Luise Rainer"
1984–1985	Rituals	Mike Gallagher	
1984	Obsessive Love	Garreth	Television film
1988	Monsters	Merrick	Episode: "Sleeping Dragon"
1991	Full House	Sheriff	Episode: "The Wedding"
1995–1996	The Bold and the Beautiful	Dr. Brian Carey	
1996	Baywatch Nights	Miles Harrington	Episode: "Thin Blood"
1997–2001	Port Charles	Scott Baldwin	
1997	Echo	Jackson Lewis	Television film
1998	Melrose Place	Waiter	Episode: "Not Quite All About Eve"
2004–2006	Justice League Unlimited	Green Arrow/Oliver Queen	Voice
2004	The Young and the Restless	Harrison Bartlett	
2005–2006	As the World Turns	Keith Morrissey	
2011	The Young and the Restless	Jeffrey Bardwell	Replaced Ted Shackelford for 6 months

Preceded by Johnny Jensen	Scott Baldwin (role); 1977–2024	On hiatus
