= Lesly =

Lesly is both a given name and a surname. Notable people with the name include:

== Given name ==
- Lesly Fellinga (born 1985), Haitian footballer
- Lesly Malouda (born 1983), French footballer
- Lesly St. Fleur (21st century), Bahamian footballer

== Surname ==
- Walter Lesly, a fictional character

== See also ==
- Lesley (disambiguation)
- Leslie (disambiguation)
