= Denise Alexander =

American actress (1939–2025)

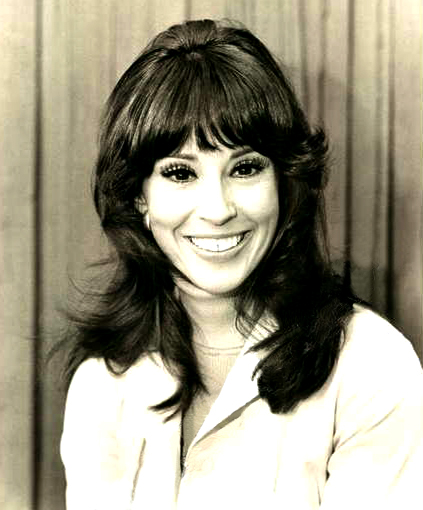
- Alexander in 1973
- Born: November 11, 1939; New York City, U.S.
- Died: March 5, 2025 (aged 85); Boulder, Colorado, U.S.
- Education: UCLA
- Occupation: Actress
- Years active: 1949–2025
- Known for: General Hospital
- Spouse: Richard A. Colla (died 2021)

Denise Alexander (November 11, 1939 – March 5, 2025) was an American actress best known for her role as Lesley Webber on General Hospital, a role she originally played from 1973 to 1984 (contract), 1996 to 2009, and a guest stint in 2013, in honor of the show's 50th anniversary. Alexander returned to General Hospital for two other guest appearances in December 2017 and April 2019, the latter to commemorate the 56th anniversary of the show. She then reappeared from January to February 2021.

== Life and career ==
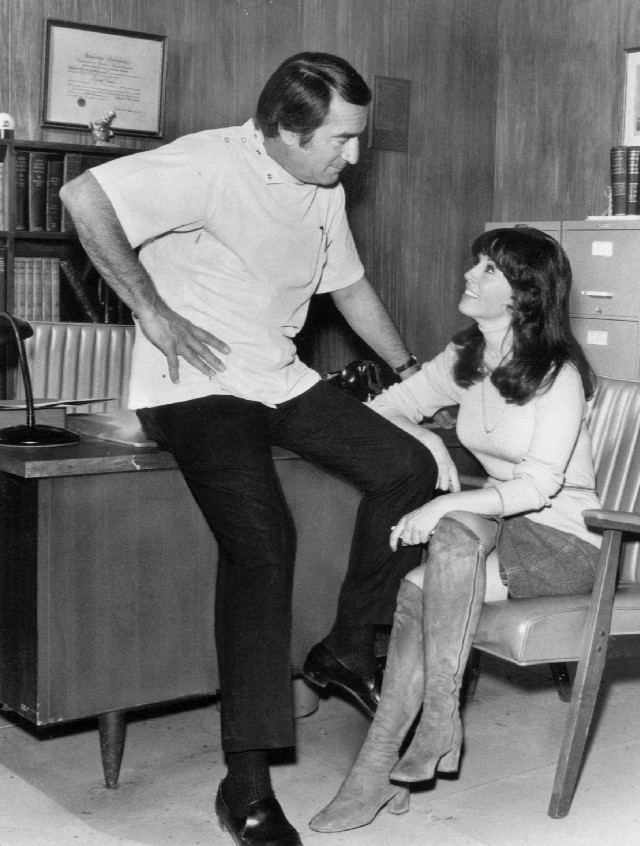
Alexander with John Beradino on General Hospital, 1973

Alexander was born in New York City on November 11, 1939, and raised on Long Island. She moved to Los Angeles when her father, Alec Alexander, an agent who handled such notables as Frank Gorshin and Sal Mineo, decided to make the switch from the East to the West Coast. Alexander had appeared on TV and radio by the time she was a junior at University of California, Los Angeles. She made her feature movie debut at age fourteen in the Don Siegel film Crime in the Streets starring John Cassavetes. In 1962 Alexander appeared as Mildred Kroeger on the first season of the TV western The Virginian on the episode titled "Impasse."

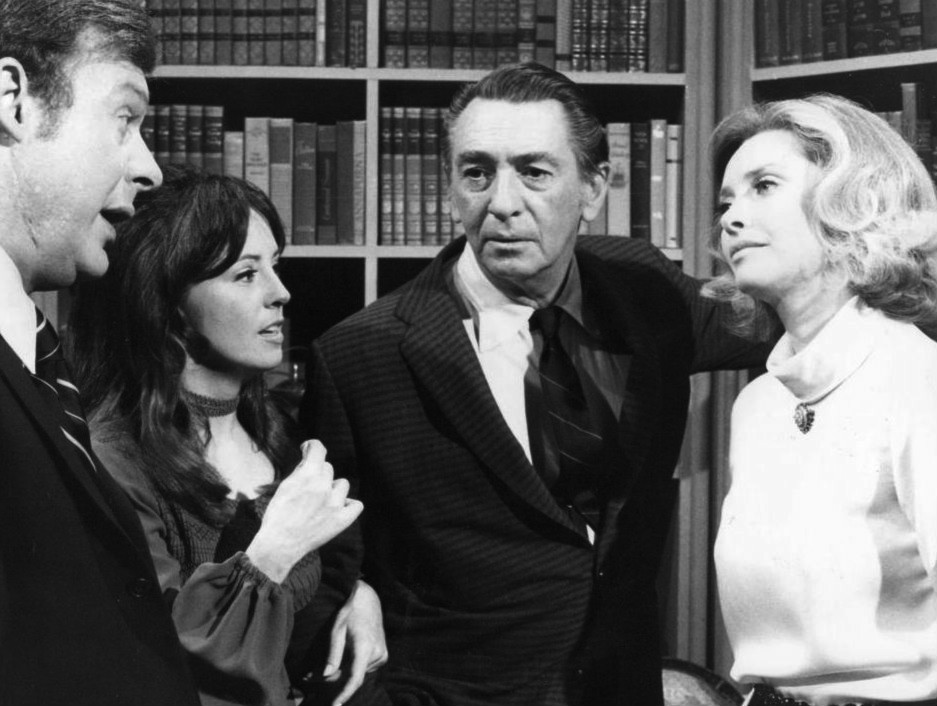
Days of Our Lives cast photo (1971) L−R: Edward Mallory, Alexander, Macdonald Carey and Susan Flannery

Alexander first broke into the soap opera genre by playing Lois Adams on The Clear Horizon in 1960. Her big break on soaps came via the role of Susan Hunter Martin on Days of Our Lives from 1966 to 1973. In 1973, the character of Susan was written out of the show temporarily during contract negotiations with Alexander. ABC Daytime rushed to offer her a then-unheard of salary/perks package to join General Hospital. When Susan eventually returned to Days, she was portrayed by Bennye Gatteys.

Alexander's role on General Hospital, Lesley Webber, became a long-running role. She stayed with the show for eleven years as one of the show's most popular leading ladies, leaving in 1984 after a contract dispute. In 1986, she was offered a big salary to portray McKinnon matriarch, Mary, on Another World. When the commute from her home in Los Angeles to Another World's studio in New York City proved to be difficult for her, she left the show, filming her last scene in 1989, but briefly returned for a guest appearance in 1991. In 1996, she returned to the role of Lesley (brought back from the dead after almost 13 years) on General Hospital, which she continued playing on a recurring basis until 2009 when the character simply faded from view. She reprised the role in time for the show's 50th anniversary in 2013 and remained on canvas as a recurring character throughout that year. Alexander reprised her role on General Hospital in late December 2017 for a short stint, and also for one episode in April 2019 for the show's 56th anniversary. She also reprised the role from January to February 2021.

Alexander died in Boulder, Colorado, on March 5, 2025, at the age of 85. According to her stepson, she died of natural causes.

== Filmography ==
In November 1949, Alexander played Perry Como's daughter on Perry Como's Chesterfield Supper Club on NBC. It was a Thanksgiving-themed show with guest Raymond Massey portraying Abraham Lincoln.

Year	Title	Role	Notes
1950	Dimension X	Mink	Episode: "There Will Come Soft Rains / Zero Hour"
1951	Robert Montgomery Presents		Episode: "Bubbles"
1951	Armstrong Circle Theatre		Episode: "That Man Is Mine"
1952	Kraft Television Theatre		Episode: "Lace on Her Petticoat"
1955	Robert Montgomery Presents	Jeannie	Episode: "The Tall Dark Man"
1955	The Adventures of Huckleberry Finn	Mary Jane Wilks	TV movie
1956	Crime in the Streets	Maria Gioia	
1956	Father Knows Best	Georgia	Episode: "No Apron Strings"
1958	The Veil	Ruth Cooper	TV mini-series
1958	The Walter Winchell File	Teresa Filchok	Episode: "Hot Night in Manhattan"
1958	Westinghouse Desilu Playhouse		Episode: "Song of Bernadette"
1958	Make Room for Daddy	Connie Coleman	Episode: "Terry's Girlfriend"
1959	The Danny Thomas Show	Gerta Shoentler	Episode: "Red Tape"
1959	The DuPont Show with June Allyson	Ellie	Episode: "Love Is a Headache"
1959	The Ann Sothern Show	Connie	Episode: "The Sal Mineo Story"
1960–1962	The Clear Horizon	Lois Adams	Series regular
1960	The Twilight Zone	Jody Sturka	Episode: "Third from the Sun"
1960	This Is the Life (TV series)	Lois	Episode: The Trap of Freedom
1960	Letter to Loretta	Joyce Parker	Episode: "Plain, Unmarked Envelope"
1960	The Detectives	Donna	Episode: "Armed and Dangerous"
1960	The Many Loves of Dobie Gillis	Jini Metzger	Episode: "Rock-A-Bye Dobie"
1960	The Blue Angels (TV series)	Sally Beckett	Episode: "Blind Flight"
1961	The Detectives	Madge Snyder	Episode: "The Frightened Ones"
1961	The Barbara Stanwyck Show	Janue Hunter	Episode: "Call Me Annie"
1961	Angel		Episode: "Goodbye, Young Lovers"
1961	Sea Hunt	Caroline Tucker	Season 4, episode 23: "Baby"
1962	Ben Casey	Ann Muller	Episode: "A Memory of Candy Stripes"
1962	Stoney Burke	Arlette Hughes	Episode: "The Mob Riders"
1962	The Virginian	Mildred Kroeger	Episode: "Impasse"
1963	Ben Jerrod	Emily Sanders	Series regular
1963	Combat!	Annette	Season 1 Episode 21 "No Time for Pity"
1964	Combat!	Jacqueline	Season 2 Episode 18 "The General and the Sergeant"
1964	The Fisher Family	Lois	Episode: "The Trap of Freedom"
1965	Diamond Jim: Skulduggery in Samantha	Catherine	TV movie
1965	That Funny Feeling	Helen	
1966–1973	Days of Our Lives	Susan Martin	Series regular
1973	The ABC Afternoon Playbreak	Laura	Episode: "The Gift of Terror"
1973–1984, 1996‍–‍2009, 2013, 2017, 2019, 2021	General Hospital	Lesley Webber	Series regular (1973–1984), Recurring (1996–2009, 2013), guest (2017, 2019, 2021) Nominated − Daytime Emmy Award for Outstanding Lead Actress in a Drama Series (1976)
1976	The Lindbergh Kidnapping Case	Violet Sharpe	TV movie
1983	Shaft of Love	Maxine Burke	TV movie
1984	Hotel	Gail McLain	Episode: "Lifelines"
1986–1989, 1991	Another World	Mary McKinnon	Series regular
1995	Zoya	Axelle	TV movie
1997–1998	Sunset Beach	Sister Beatrice	15 episodes
2010–2012	Pretty the Series	Louise Fitzpatrick	8 episodes
2013	The Inn	Lola	10 episodes
