= Lesley =

Lesley is a placename, given name and surname, a variant of Leslie that can be male or female name and is ultimately an anglicization of a Scottish (Gaelic) placename.

== Places ==
- Fort Lesley J. McNair, American army facility
- Lesley University, American academic institution
- Lesley, Western Australia, a suburb of Perth

== People ==
=== Given name ===
- Lesley Arfin (born 1979), American author
- Lesley Baker (b. 1944), Australian actress
- Lesley Bamberger (born 1965), Dutch billionaire, owner of Kroonenberg Groep
- Lesley Blanch (1904–2007), British writer and editor
- Lesley M. M. Blume (b. 1975), American author
- Lesley Turner Bowrey (b. 1942), Australian tennis player
- Lesley-Ann Brandt (b. 1981), South African-born actress
- Lesley Choyce (b. 1951), American-born writer based in Canada
- Lesley Crewe, Canadian writer
- Lesley-Anne Down (b. 1954), British actress
- Lesley Ann Downey (1954–1964), British murder victim
- Lesley Douglas (b. 1963), British radio executive
- Lesley Duncan (1943–2010), British singer-songwriter
- Lesley Dunlop (b. 1956), British actress
- Lesley Elliott (disambiguation), multiple people
- Lesley Garrett (b. 1955), British soprano
- Lesley Gill, American anthropology professor
- Lesley Gore (1946–2015), American singer-songwriter
- Lesley Hawker (b. 1981), Canadian figure skater
- Lesley Head, Australian geographer
- Lesley Hinds (b. 1956), Lord Provost of Edinburgh, Scotland
- Lesley Joseph (b. 1945), British actress
- Lesley Judd (b. 1946), British actress
- Lesley Langley (b. 1944/5), Miss World 1965 from Britain
- Lesley Magnus (b. 1977), Canadian field hockey player
- Lesley Mahmood (b. 1942), British politician
- Lesley Manville (b. 1956), British actress
- Lesley J. McNair (1883–1944), American military officer
- Lesley Molseed (1964–1975), British murder victim
- Lesley Moreland, English author whose daughter was murdered in 1990
- Lesley Jean Murdoch (b. 1956), New Zealand cricketer
- Lesley Rumball (b. 1973), New Zealand netball player
- Lesley Sanderson (b. 1985/6), contestant on the British Big Brother TV series
- Lesley Scott, contributing writer to Doctor Who
- Lesley Sharp (b. 1964), British actress
- Lesley Soper (b. 1954), New Zealand politician
- Lesley Stahl (b. 1941), American broadcast journalist
- Lesley Vainikolo (b. 1979), New Zealand rugby player
- Lesley Visser (b. 1953), American sports broadcaster
- Lesley Walker (1945–2025), British film editor
- Lesley Ward, Australian mathematician
- Lesley Ann Warren (b. 1946), American actress
- Lesley Waters (b. 1960), British celebrity chef
- Lesley Whittle (1957–1975), British murder victim
- Twiggy (born Lesley Hornby, 1949), British model and actress

=== Surname ===
- John Lesley (1527–1596), Scottish bishop and historian
- Peter Lesley (1819–1903), American geologist
- Brad Lesley (1958–2013), American baseball player
- Caroline Lesley (b. 1978), Canadian actress

== Fictional characters ==
- Lesley May, character in the novel series Rivers of London
- Lesley Smiles, character in the animated television series CJ the DJ
- Lesley Webber, character in American soap opera General Hospital
- Lesley, playable character in the mobile game Mobile Legends: Bang Bang
- Lesley, the female antagonist of the British puppet series Don't Hug Me, I'm Scared
- Lieutenant Lesley, a character from Star Trek, played by Eddie Paskey (spelled Lesley in the show's credits, but has come to be written more often as Leslie by the fandom)

== See also ==
- "Lesley", a song by Dave from Psychodrama
- Leslie (disambiguation)
