= Steve Hardy (General Hospital) =

Fictional character from General Hospital

- General Hospital character
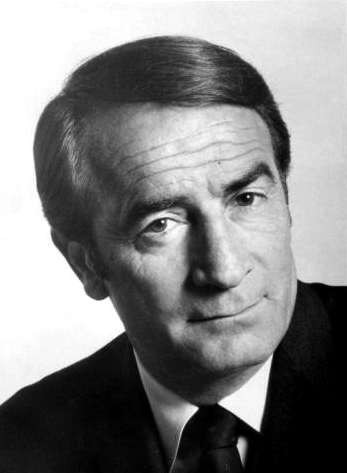
- John Beradino as Steve Hardy
- Portrayed by: John Beradino; Jason Thompson (2015)
- Duration: 1963–1996; 2015
- First appearance: April 1, 1963
- Last appearance: April 23, 1996; April 1, 2015 (flashback)
- Created by: Theordore Ferro; Mathilde Ferro
- Introduced by: Selig J. Seligman
- Book appearances: Robin's Diary
- Crossover appearances: One Life to Live
In-universe information
- Other names: Steven Hardy (full name)
- Occupation: Chief of Staff
- Family: Hardy
- Father: Lyle Hardy
- Mother: Bernice Hardy
- Spouse: Audrey March (1965–67, 1976, 1977–96)
- Sons: Jeff Webber
- Adoptive sons: Tom Hardy
- Grandchildren: Steve Webber; Sarah Webber; Elizabeth Webber; Hayden Barnes; Tommy Hardy (adoptive)

Steve Hardy is a fictional character from the ABC soap opera General Hospital. Former Major League Baseball infielder John Beradino originated the role of Steve Hardy on the show's April 1, 1963, premiere, portraying the character for 33 years until taken ill and last appearing on April 23, 1996. A leading presence on the series in over 4,300 episodes, Beradino received a star on the Hollywood Walk of Fame in 1993, the same year GH celebrated its 30th anniversary. Jason Thompson portrayed the character in a flashback episode for the show's 52nd anniversary.

== Storylines ==
Dr. Steven Hardy works on the seventh floor of General Hospital. He is so devoted to his work that his fiancée, Peggy Mercer, leaves him because she knows his job will always come before her. Steve's first patient is Angie Costello (Jana Taylor), who had been in a severe car accident with her boyfriend Eddie Weeks. After the surgery, Angie's face is wrapped in bandages, and Steve and Nurse Jessie Brewer (Emily McLaughlin) have to talk her out of suicide. In February 1964, a young flight attendant named Audrey March (Rachel Ames) comes to visit her sister Lucille and takes a job as a private nurse. Audrey and Steve fall in love and plan to marry, but Audrey realizes Steve loves his job more than her. She breaks their engagement and accepts the marriage proposal from her patient Randy. Before they marry, Audrey is diagnosed with lymphoma and Steve stays by her side through her radiation therapy. They reconcile and marry in February 1965. Audrey, thinking Steve is sterile and desperately wanting children, secretly undergoes artificial insemination and becomes pregnant. Audrey tells Steve during a car ride, and they get in an accident that causes her miscarriage. Audrey files for divorce and leaves town to aid orphans in Vietnam. In 1969, Audrey returns and marries Dr. Tom Baldwin, who rapes her when she refuses to consummate their marriage. She leaves Tom and tells everyone the baby is stillborn, while really having him live with his nanny Peggy Nelson. She later marries Dr. Jim Hobart after he performs open heart surgery on her child.

Dr. Hardy makes a crossover appearance on sister soap opera One Life to Live in fictional Llanview with Dr. Jim Craig (Nat Polen) on episodes aired from March 18 through March 21, 1970.

In 1976, Terri Webber Arnett comes to town with her younger brothers, Rick and Jeff, after their parents, Lars and Helene, were killed in an accident. Many years ago, Steve had had a relationship with Helene while she was separated from Lars. When Jeff shoots himself and is in jeopardy of dying, Terri tells Steve about a letter Helene had told her about on her deathbed. The letter reveals that Steve is Jeff's biological father. Meanwhile, Audrey's marriage to Jim falls apart and Audrey takes an overdose of pills. Steve finds her and rushes her to General Hospital, where she survives and confesses her undying love for Steve. They reconcile, and Audrey helps Steve when he is temporarily paralyzed. They remarry and Steve adopts Audrey's son, Tom. When Lassa fever hits and Steve falls ill, Audrey tells Jeff that Steve is his real father. Jeff is hurt but eventually Steve and Jeff bond. Steve and Audrey meet their first grandchild when Jeff is reunited with Steven Lars Webber, three years after his wife Heather Grant Webber had sold him to Diana Taylor.

In the late 1980s, Audrey and Steve's son Tom becomes a doctor at General Hospital. In 1993, Audrey surprises Steve with an anniversary party to honor his thirty years at General Hospital. Steve pledges that he will treat patients more and perform hospital administration work less. Later, Audrey is attacked by a psychotic Ryan Chamberlain and Steve has to perform surgery on her. Steve votes for Kevin Collins for Chief of Psychiatry, and Tom joins the staff under Kevin. In 1996, Steve dies of a heart attack while trying to keep General Hospital out of considerable financial debt. The entire community mourns Steve's death.

== Recognition and reception ==
In tribute to Beradino, General Hospital left his image, paired with that of Rachel Ames, in its opening sequence for 18 months after his death. Though that image was finally removed in early 1998, a clip of Beradino's Steve Hardy in the hospital remained in the sequence until that sequence's 2004 retirement. Beradino received three Daytime Emmy Award nominations for Best Actor in a Daytime Drama.

In 2023, Charlie Mason from Soaps She Knows placed Steve at third place on his ranked list of General Hospital’s 40+ Greatest Characters of All Time, commenting "The white hats in Port Charles tend to get overlooked in favor of the anti-heroes and bad boys — but not by us. We still fondly remember John Beradino’s good doctor — or, as we think of him, the foundation upon which General Hospital is built.".
