= Leslie =

Leslie may refer to:

- Leslie (name), a name and list of people with the given name or surname, including fictional characters

== Families ==
- Clan Leslie, a Scottish clan with the motto "grip fast"
- Leslie (Russian nobility), a Russian noble family of Scottish origin

== Places ==
=== Canada ===
- Leslie, Saskatchewan
- Leslie Street, a road in Toronto and York Region, Ontario
  - Leslie (TTC), a subway station
  - Leslie Street Spit, an artificial spit in Toronto

=== United States ===
- Leslie, Arkansas
- Leslie, Georgia
- Leslie, Michigan
- Leslie, Missouri
- Leslie, West Virginia
- Leslie, Wisconsin
- Leslie Township, Michigan
- Leslie Township, Minnesota

=== Elsewhere ===
- Leslie Dam, a dam in Warwick, Queensland, Australia
- Leslie, Mpumalanga, South Africa
- Leslie, Aberdeenshire, Scotland
- Leslie, Fife, Scotland

== Other uses ==
- Leslie speaker system
- Leslie Motor Car company
- Leslie Controls, Inc.
- Leslie (singer) (born 1985), French singer
- List of storms named Leslie

== See also ==
- Lesley (disambiguation)
