= Bobbie Spencer =

Fictional character from General Hospital

- General Hospital character
- Jacklyn Zeman as Bobbie Spencer
- Portrayed by: Jacklyn Zeman; Kelly Stables (2003 flashbacks); Katie Mewes (2015 flashbacks)
- Duration: 1978–2010; 2013–2023
- First appearance: January 23, 1978
- Last appearance: April 27, 2023
- Created by: Douglas Marland
- Introduced by: Gloria Monty (1978); Frank Valentini (2013)
- Book appearances: Robin's Diary
- Spin-off appearances: General Hospital: Twist of Fate (1996)
In-universe information
- Other names: Barbara Jean Spencer; Bobbie Cassadine; Bobbie Jones; Bobbie Meyer; Bobbie Brock
- Occupation: Operating Nurse; Co-owner of Kelly's Diner; Prostitute
- Family: Spencer
- Parents: Tim Spencer; Lena Spencer
- Brothers: Luke Spencer
- Sisters: Patricia Spencer
- Husband: D. L. Brock (1984–85); Jake Meyer (1986–88); Tony Jones (1989–96); Stefan Cassadine (1996–97)
- Daughters: Carly Corinthos
- Adoptive sons: Lucas Jones
- Adoptive daughters: B. J. Jones
- Grandsons: Michael Corinthos; Morgan Corinthos
- Granddaughters: Josslyn Jacks; Donna Corinthos
- Grandmothers: Beatrice Eckert
- Uncles: Fred Eckert
- Aunts: Ruby Anderson
- Nephews: Lucky Spencer; Ethan Lovett
- Nieces: Lulu Falconeri; Valerie Spencer
- First cousins: Bill Eckert; Jenny Eckert

Barbara Jean "Bobbie" Spencer, RN is a fictional character from the ABC soap opera General Hospital, portrayed by Jacklyn Zeman. She debuted in January 1978, after playing Lana McClain on the sister-soap One Life to Live. Zeman went on to appear on General Hospital until 13 July 2010. The character is the sister of Luke Spencer and mother of Carly Corinthos. In February 2013, it was announced that Zeman would be returning to the role; she first appeared on March 22 and once again vacated the role on April 15. However, on October 22, it was confirmed that Zeman would be returning to the show, with her first airdate slated to be on November 27. Zeman continued in the role until her last appearance on April 27, 2023, shortly before her death on May 9 of that year.

== Backstory ==
Barbara Jean “Bobbie” Spencer, was born in Port Charles on July 8, 1957 and raised in a poor family living near the docks, along with her big brother, Luke. The streetwise Luke was very protective of his baby sister growing up. Their father, Tim, was an abusive alcoholic. One day, when Bobbie was a little girl, their mother, Lena, suffered an appendicitis attack. Tim watched as Lena lay dying. Finally he allowed Luke to call an ambulance, but it was too late. Lena died, and Tim walked out on his kids. But the truth was revealed by Luke and Bobbie's older sister Patricia Spencer many years later. The truth was that on April 1, 1963, Luke accidentally killed his mother and then his father in a fit of rage. Luke had been blocking out the memory for over 50 years, with Pat and Bill Eckert helping keep it a secret. Luke befriended Lila Quartermaine, who was planning to adopt both Bobbie and Luke, but they left town to move in with their aunt Ruby Anderson, in Jacksonville, Florida. Ruby was a prostitute and to make ends meet, Bobbie had to become a "working girl" too. At age 16, she was forced to give her baby (Carly Corinthos) up for adoption.

== Storylines ==
=== 1978–2001 ===
Bobbie re-entered Port Charles as a prostitute-turned-nurse. The bubbly nurse made an immediate impression on the staff with her disposition. Nurse Jessie Brewer, who had been through much tragedy, became Bobbie's confidante, and offered Bobbie her spare bedroom. Bobbie came to adore Jessie, who treated her like the daughter she had previously lost, and Bobbie helped her through hard times as well, also trying to push Jessie to accept the marriage proposal of the gold-hearted hospital administrator Dan Rooney. To Steve and Audrey Hardy, Jessie and Dan, Bobbie seemed like a compassionate person, but Bobbie had another side to her that she kept hidden from them. She wanted desperately to marry Scotty Baldwin but although he visited her bed from time to time, he was in love with Laura Webber. So Bobbie got her brother to come to town as part of a plan to break up Scotty and Laura whom Bobbie was intensely jealous of. Bobbie had tormented Laura every chance she got, and when Laura had enough of it and pushed Bobbie out of anger towards her, Bobbie accused her of attacking her without provocation. Their fight had been interrupted by Monica Quartermaine who suspected that Bobbie had been harassing Laura and supported Laura over Bobbie. When the plan didn't work to get Laura sent to reform school for missing her curfew, Bobbie pretended to be pregnant with Scotty's child, but Scotty ended up marrying Laura after Bobbie's lies were exposed. Bobbie's only happiness came from the arrival of Ruby Anderson, her aging aunt who had given up "the life" and became part of the cleaning staff at General Hospital.

Bobbie next fell in love with Roy DiLucca, a mobster and Luke's partner at the Campus Disco, who treated Bobbie like a queen and planned to marry her. He died in her arms after being shot while fleeing from his attempted assassination of Senator Mitch Williams. Once again, Bobbie blamed Laura for her misery since Laura had thrown Luke's keys away while he was on his way to assassinate Mitch, thus sending Roy to his death. Bobbie's feud with Laura not only stemmed from the fact that Laura had won Scotty, but also the love of her brother, Luke, whom Bobbie knew was Laura's rapist. Bobbie remained antagonistic towards Laura, even making a drunken play for Scotty during a time he was having issues in his marriage to Laura, but for the most part, was a loyal nurse and friend to those around her. When Luke and Laura went on the run from Frank Smith's mob, Bobbie's attitudes towards Laura began to change for the better. Bobbie was horrified when Joe Kelly's father, Paddy, was killed after an attack by one of Smith's men, and prevented Joe from going after Frank, thus saving his life. When Luke and Laura came back from their summer on the run, Bobbie made an attempt to understand why she had treated Laura with such resentment, and on Thanksgiving Day, urged Luke to call Laura so they, along with Aunt Ruby, could go on with their dinner. Months later, she fell in love with Dr. Noah Drake and even went as far as to pretend to be blind in order to keep him. Noah made it clear he did not want to make a commitment, also dating sexy blonde nurse Stacey Rawlins.

When Luke and Laura were finally married in November 1981, Bobbie was one of her former rival Laura's bridesmaids. She decided to move to New York after her relationship with Noah fizzled, but returned the following year and tried once again to win him back before he left town for another position. After an affair with D. L. Brock, Bobbie became pregnant with his child but she miscarried in November 1983 and neglected to tell him. They were married in January 1984 by Lee Baldwin. Once they were married he became extremely abusive. Bobbie learned that D.L. was responsible for the arrival of little Mikey Webber's real mother, Ginny Blake, and argued with Lesley Webber in the hospital, after which Lesley was killed in a car accident. Bobbie was horrified to identify the body, and after realizing that D.L. had made Lesley upset, became determined to get out of this marriage. He was ultimately murdered in January 1985. She was initially charged with his murder but her attorney Jake Meyer proved that Ginny Blake Webber killed him.

In 1986, Bobbie married Jake Meyer, who had a one-night stand with Lucy Coe. When Lucy became pregnant, Jake and Bobbie worked out a deal with her to raise Lucy's child as their own, but Lucy miscarried the baby. Around this time, a DVX agent who had taken the hospital cafeteria hostage scratched Bobbie with a deadly syringe. An antidote was found, but Bobbie was paralyzed. Bobbie's recovery was helped along by an optimistic and boisterous paraplegic, Martha McKee. Martha, who was suffering from pneumonia, had to move to Colorado after taking a turn for the worse, and Bobbie agreed to raise her kids, 10-year-old Skeeter and teenage Melissa. Melissa rebelled and began hanging out with a bad crowd, injuring Ruby when she and her friend Val robbed Kelly's, and she and Val fled to Miami. They fell prey to a pimp who forced them into prostitution. When Greg, Melissa's spurned boyfriend, told Bobbie, she flew down to Miami without telling Jake. Posing as a call girl, she planned to alert the cops to the pimp's illegal activities before she had to sleep with him. The police did arrive, arresting him-and Bobbie too! The recently returned Scotty Baldwin bailed her out, but her arrest made headlines in Port Charles; Melissa and Skeeter were taken away from her, and she and Jake weren't allowed to adopt.

Jake left town to help flood victims in Paraguay, partially due to being sick of her need for children. He tried to explain himself through the mail, but Scotty destroyed the letter and put doubts in Bobbie's mind because he wanted Bobbie for himself. After seeing a photo of Jake with his arm around a woman, she divorced Jake; and four months passed before she realized Scott's bad ways and dumped him. Bobbie then met a sophisticated, rich, handsome man, Gregory Howard, in a bar. Unfortunately, he was (unhappily) married and the father of Melissa's ex, Greg. After weeks of talk and flirting, she finally agreed to go on a weekend with him, but a political party drafted him to run for the state assembly. Bobbie was left brokenhearted yet again as she realized his new political career and an affair wouldn't mix.

In 1989 she married her good friend and father of her namesake B.J., Dr. Tony Jones. In 1991, Bobbie treated a patient who bore an amazing resemblance to Luke Spencer. He was her cousin, Bill Eckert; the Eckerts and the Spencers had been strangers for years due to bad blood. Bobbie desperately wanted a baby and in fact purchased one from the black market. Unbeknownst to her the baby was Cheryl Stansbury's baby. Bobbie tried to keep the truth a secret, but the truth came out (putting a strain on her marriage), and she had to give the baby back to Cheryl. When Cheryl died, Bobbie became embroiled in a custody suit for the baby (Lucas) with Tiffany Donely, Cheryl's sister. The court awarded Bobbie custody of Lucas in 1992. Also in 1992, Bobbie began writing letters to ex-convict and cop killer Joseph Atkins after being impressed by his book, Violence Tamed. He wrote back, asking her to help him get parole. Tony went berserk when Atkins began calling Bobbie at home. Bobbie realized she couldn't support Atkins. When she cut off contact, he told her she'd be sorry. Months later, he broke into the Brownstone, holding her and Tony hostage and trying to rape her before finally being caught by the police.

In 1994, while spying for Luke, she began a flirtation with the evil Damian Smith, in fact Tony caught them in the stairwell of General Hospital embracing the day that B.J. was involved in a school bus accident and was killed. Although devastated by B.J.'s death, Bobbie was somewhat comforted by the fact that B.J.'s heart had gone to Felicia's daughter Maxie. Bobbie consummated her romance with Damian after Tony threw her out, but when she learned he had only seduced her as part of a bet with Lucy, she left him to die in the catacombs. They separated and after counseling eventually found their way back to each other, but Tony was emotionally spent and things were never quite the same with them. Bobbie and Tony befriended a young woman that came to Port Charles, Carly Roberts, not knowing that she was really the baby that Bobbie had given up for adoption. On the day of her wedding anniversary to Tony, Bobbie found Tony and Carly in bed together and that was finally the end of their marriage. She then immediately turned to and married Stefan Cassadine. Eventually she realized that all the things her brother Luke and everyone else had been telling her about how horrible a man Stefan was, were true and agreed to help Luke expose him. She drugged a glass of wine he was drinking and thinking he had finished it, removed a medallion from around his neck that was the key they needed to open up a box he had. Stefan had not drunk the wine and therefore caught her and threw her out. She went to Puerto Rico and obtained a divorce.

Shortly thereafter, Bobbie learned that Carly, who was now engaged to Tony and carrying his baby, was really the daughter she had given up so long ago. Carly had a lot of anger toward Bobbie for leaving her, but the two were able to rebuild their relationship. The birth of Carly's son and Bobbie's first grandchild, Michael, helped a lot. When Bobbie found out Luke had known for a few years, and had lied to her that her baby had died, she coldly berated him, promising to never forgive what he had done. However, a Spencer is a Spencer, and she did. Bobbie was aggressively wooed by Jerry Jacks and fell in love with him. The height of her embarrassment was when their sexual exploits in the GH board room were accidentally filmed and shown at the Nurse's Ball. She was devastated when her wedding to Jerry was thwarted by his arrest by FBI agents. Jerry jumped bail and left town after their tearful good-bye. Just before Jerry's arrest, Bobbie was stunned to find her old flame, Roy DiLucca, supposedly dead, was alive, well and in town. Her feelings about Roy were jumbled, but after Jerry left town, Roy and Bobbie renewed their love. Bobbie learned Roy was a federal agent, responsible for busting Jerry, but managed to forgive him before he was taken back to jail. With Bobbie and Luke's help, Roy eventually found the evidence to take down corrupt supervisor Larkin, and Bobbie and Roy were finally free to be together.

Their life together went on with relative uneventfulness (Roy had to rescue Luke several times; Tony questioned the effect on Lucas Bobbie's relationship with an ex-con might have; Bobbie, not knowing Roy was trying to pay off Mike Corbin's gambling debts, feared Roy was working for Sonny when she saw Roy having meetings with Sorel; Bobbie had to deal with Carly's various crises) until December 2000, when Bobbie found a letter from a woman named Melissa in Roy's apartment. Roy claimed Larkin must have put the letter in there, but he refused to report a break-in. After lying to Roy, Bobbie went to Chicago to visit Melissa. Melissa was a surgical nurse, with a deceased brother named Leo who had run a club with Roy. Bobbie went to see Melissa again with more questions. Roy eventually found out Bobbie had lied to him, but forgave her. Shortly after, Melissa moved to Port Charles, joined the nursing staff, and was with Roy at every turn. Bobbie, increasingly edgy and jealous, misplaced files and accused Melissa of the deed. Melissa quit her job, but after a few more confrontations with Bobbie, changed her mind and began fighting back.

Bobbie was hysterical when beloved son Lucas suddenly became near-death from a mysterious illness. Roy tried his best to stay true to Bobbie. Meanwhile, Carly begged him to turn Sonny into the feds, hoping Sonny would agree to witness protection. Roy agreed, but the plan backfired on Carly when Sonny refused to cooperate, then dumped her after he learned of her part in the sting. When Bobbie heard, she flew into a rage, accusing Roy of destroying Carly's happiness. She broke off her relationship with him, shutting out his every attempt to explain, and finally telling him she had set Melissa up with the files. Despite this, Bobbie refused his several attempts at reconciliation. Finally, she softened, and they parted as friends. The only bright spot in Bobbie's life at this time was Lucas' rapid recovery. Unbeknownst to her, Lucas had been poisoned by Helena's puppet, Lucky, and Tony had agreed to her demands in exchange for the cure. Unfortunately, Helena's demands included Tony helping Helena bring back her son Stavros from a frozen state. Helena and Stavros then terrorized various PC residents before a final showdown in Helena's lab underneath GH. Bobbie was taken hostage during the event and Roy and Scott worked to rescue her along with several other hostages. Helena and Stavros were finally defeated and life returned to normal.

=== 2002–2010 ===
In early 2002, Bobbie and Scott rekindled their relationship after Scott and Laura parted ways. Around this time, Carly was presumed dead after driving her car off a cliff, and Bobbie remained in denial until a body believed to be that of Carly was found in the harbor. This sorrow later turned to joy as Carly was revealed to be alive at her memorial service. Bobbie and Scott's relationship continued until Scott began using unscrupulous tactics to win the District Attorney election. Scott began harassing Carly for information on Alexis Davis, the candidate running against him, and this is what fizzled the relationship between the duo. Bobbie laid low for a while and spent much of her time trying to keep Lucas in line. He wasn't doing well in school but they later learned that he had dyslexia.

In 2003, Carly announced that she was pregnant to family and friends. On the dark side of things, various conflicts put Carly's pregnancy in jeopardy on many occasions and caused reasons for friends and family to worry. In April, Carly fell through ice while walking Michael off of a frozen pond. In June, Carly was kidnapped by psychotic Ric Lansing (who wanted to present Carly's baby to his wife, Liz, who had just miscarried theirs). In July, a captive Carly accidentally electrocuted herself while trying to communicate with Jason from the panic room. These conflicts affected Sonny the most; towards the end of Carly's pregnancy, Sonny was so worried that something would happen to Carly and the unborn baby that he practically forced Carly to leave a baby shower Bobbie threw for her (where she was surrounded by her family). During a thunderstorm, Carly was looking over a house and was at the top of the stairs when she fell down them and went into labor. Luckily, Lorenzo Alcazar (who had grown obsessed with Carly) was there to help Carly. Lorenzo was helping Carly through labor when Sonny burst in, and, thinking that Lorenzo was harming Carly (because she was experiencing labor pains and screaming), shot him. The bullet went through Lorenzo and hit Carly in the head. Carly gave birth to a baby boy before passing out. She was quickly rushed to the hospital. There, Carly remained in a coma for several weeks. Bobbie wanted to take her grandkids home with her. But Sonny told her that Jason and Courtney could take care of them until Carly finally recovered. Carly did recover, but confided in Bobbie that her feelings for everyone around her were buried beneath the dream sequences she had during her coma. Bobbie did her best to support her daughter in her recovery. Carly finally regained the memory of her feelings for her loved ones a few weeks later.

In 2004, there was a huge fire at the Port Charles Hotel that trapped some of Bobbie's loved ones. Though Bobbie was thankful that Carly and Luke made it out of the fire alive, she was saddened to learn that Scott ended up dying in it. She later found out that he was alive and on the run from Internal Affairs. Bobbie was not happy when Carly started asking more and more questions about her biological father. Bobbie gently urged Carly to drop it, but when she didn't, Bobbie strongly told Carly to stop asking and trying to hurt her. So Carly stole Bobbie's diary and found several entries referencing a man as "J.D." When Bobbie found out, she went to Sonny and implored him to stop Carly's search for her father. He agreed but then told Carly that the best way to get information from Bobbie was to keep her guard down. Sensing that Carly wouldn't stop, Bobbie hired a man to steal the diary back. Carly continued her search by looking through Ruby's old things from the days of the brothel. Carly's search led her to a powerful prosecutor in New York named John Durant.

Bobbie wasn't too happy when Durant chose to move to Port Charles, but she was soon up to it in her eyeballs when she learned that Laura was still alive. Skye learned this information as well, but when she was in a car accident on her way to tell Luke, Bobbie kept Skye sedated so that he wouldn't learn the truth, but finally confessed herself, and told Luke she hadn't wanted him to suffer any more pain. When Carly learned that Michael was murdered, Bobbie was there for her daughter, but was relieved when it was discovered that Michael was alive and well, but had been kidnapped by his biological father, AJ Quartermaine. Shortly after, Durant was shot while in the hospital, and when Bobbie's actions in surgery saved his life but left him temporarily paralysed, he sued the hospital. Luckily, Durant eventually dropped the lawsuit, but Lucas dropped another bombshell on Bobbie when he told her that he was gay.

Bobbie was devastated when, during the encephalitis plague that hit Port Charles in 2006, Tony was one of the worst hit by the disease and died.

Bobbie was on hand in early 2010 for her granddaughter Josslyn's christening.

When Kristina Davis is hospitalized after being beaten by her boyfriend, Bobbie shares with Alexis the pain of being abused by both her father and her husband. She then advises Alexis to send Kristina to a counseling group that Bobbie volunteers with.

Bobbie was seen briefly in July 2010, when she asked Ethan if he had heard anything on Luke's whereabouts. Sometime after this encounter, and off-screen, she relocates to Seattle in order to be closer to Lucas.

=== 2013–2023 ===
Bobbie is mentioned by Luke and Lulu after Lulu receives a gift from her aunt. After getting the news that Lulu has been kidnapped, Bobbie returns to Port Charles. She comforts Luke and Laura over Lulu's disappearance and supports Laura after her son Nikolas is shot. Later, she reconnects with Scott Baldwin and her daughter, Carly. After attending the Nurse's Ball and with word that Luke and Laura are safe, Bobbie leaves Port Charles to return to her life as a surgical nurse in Seattle. As she boards her plane she runs into former boyfriend, surgeon Noah Drake, who tells her he's moving to Seattle to work at the same hospital she does. Bobbie came back to Port Charles when Carly was kidnapped by crazy Heather Webber. She also tried to hide from Lucas the fact that his father, Julian Jerome, was alive and in town. In April 2014, Bobbie told Scott that she broke up with Noah after he reunited with his former flame Anne Logan. After Bobbie collapsed at the 2016 nurse's ball and had to be admitted as a patient, she was attacked and drugged, presumably by the hospital serial killer. But after she was released and Paul Hornsby was arrested for the crime, Franco learned from his mother, Heather Webber, that she had done the deed to protect him from being arrested, since she assumed that he was the killer and wanted to give him an alibi.

Bobbie was immediately suspicious of Nelle Hayes who had come to town claiming to be Josslyn's kidney donor. She never let up with her suspicions. Nelle was later forced to admit that she lied to Carly about who she was (the biological daughter of Carly's adopted father) and that she had "slept" with Sonny.

In July 2017, Bobbie came home from GH one night and discovered that her granddaughter Josslyn had thrown a huge party. She confronted Josslyn and told her the dangers of having a party while her mother (Carly) was out of town. Bobbie kept Josslyn's party a secret for about a week, before Josslyn accidentally spilled the beans to her mother.

In September 2017, Bobbie continued to investigate Nelle. Bobbie went as far to hire her best friend Felicia Scorpio to help her investigate. As Bobbie was just about to tell Felicia that she didn't need her to investigate Nelle anymore, Felicia discovered that Nelle was under suspicion for murder. Bobbie then battled how to tell her family about Nelle's latest bombshell of a secret!

On Election Day 2020, It was revealed that Bobbie's grandmother, Beatrice Eckert was a suffragist who helped secure the women's right to vote in New York State in 1917.

== Reception ==
In 2023, Charlie Mason from Soaps She Knows placed Bobbie #17 on his ranked list of General Hospital’s 40+ Greatest Characters of All Time, commenting that she had "come a long way" and "The scheming ex-hooker was transformed over the decades from desperate to dependable — miraculously, without losing the mischievous twinkle in her eye."
