= McClung, West Virginia =

- Ghost town
- Location within West Virginia
- Coordinates: 38°02′16″N 80°43′36″W
- Country: United States
- State: West Virginia
- County: Greenbrier
- Elevation: 2,979 ft (908 m)
- GNIS feature ID

McClung is a ghost town in Greenbrier County, West Virginia, United States. McClung was 0.5 miles (0.80 km) south of Leslie. McClung appeared on USGS maps as late as 1935. McClung still exists today but was renamed Orient Hill after the Baptist Church. The McClung post office was across Rt.20 from the church and run by the Tony Williams family. The majority of that town is down a street labeled, Ball diamond RD.
