= Lesley Elliott =

Lesley Elliott may refer to:

- Lesley Elliott (campaigner) (1946–2022), New Zealand domestic violence prevention campaigner and nurse
- Lesley Elliott (field hockey) (born 1960), New Zealand retired field hockey player
