= Lee Baldwin =

Fictional character from General Hospital

- General Hospital character
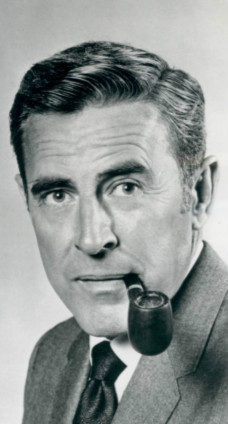
- Peter Hansen
- Portrayed by: Ross Elliott (1963–65); Peter Hansen (1965–2004)
- Duration: 1963–1986; 1989–1990; 1992–2004
- First appearance: April 23, 1963
- Last appearance: July 16, 2004
- Created by: Theodore and Mathilde Ferro
- Introduced by: James Young (1963); Joseph Hardy (1989); Wendy Riche (1992, 1997); Jill Farren Phelps (2004)
- Spin-off appearances: Port Charles
In-universe information
- Occupation: Lawyer
- Brothers: Tom Baldwin
- Spouse: Meg Bentley (1966–73); Caroline Chandler (1975–76); Gail Adamson (1979–2017)
- Adoptive sons: Scott Baldwin
- Grandsons: Franco Baldwin; Logan Hayes
- Granddaughters: Karen Wexler; Serena Baldwin; Christina Baldwin
- Nephews: Tom Hardy

Lee Baldwin is a fictional character on the daytime dramas General Hospital and Port Charles.

Ross Elliott originated the role on General Hospital in 1963. Peter Hansen inherited the role in 1965 and played it until 1986 and again from 1989 to 1990 before returning permanently from 1992 to 2004. Lee Baldwin is the adoptive father of Scott Baldwin.

== Storylines ==
=== 1963–1979 ===
A recovering alcoholic, Lee is a involved in his community and has a successful law practice. Scott had sometimes disappointed Lee over the years but these days, Lee couldn't be more proud of Scott and the way he turned his life around. In 1964, as the painful memories of her past marriage to notorious Phil Brewer subsided, Jessie Brewer began to go out on tentative dates with her lawyer, Lee Baldwin. A lifelong bachelor and recovering alcoholic, Lee was a fixture on the seventh floor of General Hospital where he volunteered as an addiction counselor.

When Jessie discovered she was pregnant by Phil after Phil left town, Lee offered to marry Jessie in order to give her baby a name. Once Jessie's divorce from Phil was finalized, she would become Mrs. Lee Baldwin. But Phil found out about Jessie's pregnancy before they could wed and returned to Port Charles. Phil plead for one month's time to make it up to Jessie, but Jessie was afraid that if she left Lee, he'd be devastated and return to drinking. Jessie went forth with her plans to marry Lee, but on the eve of their wedding, Jessie went into labor! Phil was thrilled, since the divorce wasn't finalized, and the baby would be born with his name! Jessie gave birth to a beautiful daughter, Nancy Brewer, and Lee gallantly released Jessie from the "burden" of their engagement. Unfortunately, Nancy Brewer died of a heart condition in July 1966.

Lee was delighted by the arrival of nurse Meg Bentley that same year. Meg was a widow with a young son Scotty and teenage stepdaughter Brooke. Lee was forced to maintain a platonic relationship with Meg, since she was already engaged to Dr. Noel Clinton. Meg was devastated when Noel announced that he was leaving her for her stepdaughter Brooke! Meg turned to Lee, who helped her through the shocking crisis. The situation was difficult for young Scotty Bentley, who lost both his sister and the man he hoped would become his father, when Noel and Brooke ran off to get married. Lee became a surrogate father to Scotty, and Meg happily wed Lee in late 1966. Lee adopted Scotty shortly thereafter. Lee defended Jessie when she faced murder charges over her dead husband, Dr. John Prentice. Lee lost the case, and Jessie was sent to jail, but an eleventh hour confession by her stepdaughter Polly set her free.

In 1969, Lee and Meg's marriage began to come apart when Meg's old nursing school friend, Iris Fairchild, came to Port Charles and used alcohol to solve her life's problems. Lee intervened and counseled her, giving her a job as his secretary and a reason to go on. Meg grew jealous of Lee's friendship with Iris, and accused them of having an affair. Lee and Meg separated for a while over Meg's unfounded accusations, but came together again when Lee donated his kidney to save Scotty's life.

The following year, Brooke's marriage to Noel had fallen apart and Brooke returned to live with Meg and Lee. Meg was diagnosed with breast cancer, and after a radical mastectomy, Meg's insecurities about her appearance were magnified by the presence of sexy Brooke. Meg suffered a nervous breakdown from her jealousy and depression, and Lee was regrettably forced to institutionalize his wife. By 1971, Lee was thrilled to welcome Meg back from the mental institution, supposedly recovered from her mental breakdown. Now, Meg suffered from a severe case of hypertension. Dr. Lesley Williams, a strikingly beautiful doctor, was assigned to her case at General Hospital. The jealous Meg began to suspect—wrongly—that Lesley was trying to work her way into Lee's bed! During an argument with Lee, Meg suddenly died of a stroke. Lee was devastated, but remained strong for Scotty.

Lee defended Jessie against murder charges again in 1974, when Jessie stood accused of her ex-husband Dr. Phil Brewer's murder. Jessie saddened Lee when she refused to cooperate in her own defense. Lee urged Jessie to fight the charges, letting his emotions run away with him and kissing her passionately! Lee proved Jessie's innocence, but they couldn't rekindle their old relationship. To Scotty's delight, Lee Baldwin found a soulmate in adoption agent Caroline Chandler. After a marriage and a short honeymoon, the newlyweds returned to town to face the disastrous news that Caroline's son, Bobby, an energetic med student, was suffering from an incurable case of Melenkoff's disease. Miraculously, Bobby's certain fate was reversed when Steve discovered that Bobby's fatal diagnosis was wrong! Rejoicing from the welcome news, Lee and Caroline joined Bobby in New York where he received treatment.

Lee Baldwin returned to Port Charles in 1977 after his wife died in an accident. Lee found comfort in long, warm and platonic evenings with Dr. Gail Adamson. Lee and Gail were good company for each other. Sensing his devastation, Gail secretly contacted Scotty Baldwin, Lee's stepson, urging the young law student to get in touch with the only father he'd ever known. Scotty had left Port Charles several years earlier and was now living in New York's Greenwich Village. Gail's mission worked when Scotty showed up in town. She smiled with satisfaction as father and son reunited. Scotty, agreeing to join the "establishment", accepted a clerking job at General Hospital, where he met and became instantly captivated by young Laura Webber.

In the spring of 1979, Scotty kept assuring Laura that he was doing everything in his power to bring a June wedding about, but she lost confidence that they would ever be together. Disillusioned, Laura returned her ring and set out to make new friends. Laura's disregard for his feelings sent Scotty into a tailspin. In despair, Scotty turned to drink. Thankfully, Lee, a recovering alcoholic, pulled his son out of the trap. Lee and Gail were married early in 1979, followed by Laura and Scotty a short time later. Gail and Lee were constantly wrapped up in Scotty's personal troubles. They stood by him through all the tumultuous twists and turns in Scotty's marriage to Laura which included her rape at the campus disco by Luke Spencer.

=== 1980–2013 ===
For much of 1980, Lee and Gail tried to help Laura and Scotty repair their damaged marriage which became strained because of Laura's rape. Scotty eventually found proof of who had raped Laura and showed up at Luke's wedding to Jennifer Smith, and punched Luke, sending him flying overboard the Smith yacht. Laura found Luke and disappeared from Port Charles, leaving Scotty very bitter towards life. He soon disappeared from Port Charles, leaving only a letter for Laura, denouncing her as a slut. Because he blamed her for Scotty's departure, Lee became antagonistic towards Laura, especially when they found themselves face to face at ELQ where Laura worked as a receptionist and Lee aided Edward Quartermaine in his legal issues. After Laura spent another summer on the run with Luke, she returned, determined to marry Scotty, and found him in Mexico where he promised to give her a divorce so she could marry Luke. The divorce papers ended up in Lee's hands, and he burned them, embittered over Laura's betrayal of his son. Gail feared that Lee would turn back to the bottle, but eventually Lee confessed what he had done and made amends with Laura, attending the wedding with no animosity from either Luke or Laura. When Scotty caught the bridal bouquet at the wedding and announced that he was contesting the divorce, Lee and Gail tried to talk some sense into him but were horrified to find out that he had returned to town a very embittered man. When Laura disappeared soon afterwards and was presumed dead, Lee and Gail mourned her but were relieved to find out that Scotty (who had shared a plane ride with her that very night) had nothing to do with her disappearance.

At Scotty's encouragement, Lee ran for mayor in 1983, and his opponent was none other than Luke Spencer, the man who ruined Scotty and Laura's marriage! Scotty was managing Lee's campaign and using smear tactics to discredit Luke. Scotty even threatened to expose Luke's sister's past as a prostitute to get him to drop out of the race! When Lee found out what Scotty was up to, Lee fired Scotty and Scotty left town. Luke's campaign manager D.L. Brock used Lee's alcoholism against him but Luke demanded that he not pull stunts like what Scotty had done. Luke won the election, and in a surprise move, asked lee to serve as his deputy mayor, an appointment that Lee accepted. After Laura was revealed to be alive, Luke resigned and Lee took over, serving until the 2-year term of mayor expired in December 1985 and leaving town with Gail to travel. In 1989, Gail visited Port Charles alone, informing Scott (who had returned) that Lee was busy with work. The next year, Lee paid a visit with Gail and was shocked to find him in bed with Tracy Quartermaine.

They returned to town for good in 1992 and supported Scotty when he married Dominique Taub who was dying. They were present at his wedding to Katherine Bell in late 1983 which was broken off when Lucy Coe revealed lies about Katherine's past. Scott left town shortly afterwards. Lee and Gail were surprised to learn they were grandparents, when it was revealed in 1994 that Scott fathered high school graduate Karen Wexler with his secretary Rhonda Wexler when he was a law student. The very same year, Lee defended old friend Edward Quartermaine on the charges of murdering his own illegitimate son Bradley Ward who had actually been killed by their old business acquaintance Jack Boland.

After several ups and downs with Scotty, Lee and Gail were thrilled when he returned to Port Charles in 1997 with his young daughter Serena. Dr. Julie Devlin called on Lee's legal services in 1998 when she stood accused of the General Homicide serial killings. Julie's murder trial began and Lee set out to make Dr. Eve Lambert look like the guilty party. Lee was successful in his defense of Julie, who was acquitted of all the charges against her. The killer was still at large, but the authorities now had a clue to go on as someone who resembled Eve was caught on tape by the surveillance camera on the roof of the hospital. At that same time, a woman wearing a very Eve-like wig was seen looking at herself in the mirror. When the woman turned around, it was revealed that Julie was the General Homicide killer!

As it turned out, Julie was really being controlled by evil Dr. Greg Cooper, and was doing his bidding. When Julie was finally caught, Lee Baldwin was appointed as her legal guardian, and Gail helped see to it that Julie was committed to Ferncliff psychiatric facility to get the therapy she needed. Chris and Julie schemed to have Lee replaced as Julie's guardian to further their plan to get Julie acquitted of the murder charges and released from Ferncliff.

Lee worried his loved ones in 1999 when he suffered a Pulmonary Embolism that nearly claimed his life, but with the love and support of his family rallying around him, Lee pulled through and is back to being a vital part of Port Charles. For months, DV Bordisso had made life a living hell for Scott and Lucy Coe. As it turned out, DV claimed to be Scott's biological father and he wanted to get revenge on Scott for what his mother, Meg, had done to him before Scott was even born! Scott, Lucy, Kevin, Eve and Victor all teamed up to beat DV at his own game and emerged victorious in the end. DV, however, managed to frame Scott for attempted murder, but an innocent Scott beat the charges. Scott faced some inner demons upon learning that DV was his biological father, but Lee helped Scott to see that no matter what Scott's biology, he was Lee's son, and was a good person.

Lee and Gail were devastated by the July 2003 death of their eldest granddaughter Karen, when she was hit by a car. Though Lee and Gail mourned her death, they took comfort in the fact that Karen's blood helped save Lucy's life. Lila Quartermaine quietly died in her sleep on the evening of Tuesday, July 13, 2004, and Lee and Gail paid their respects to the Quartermaines at the funeral that Friday. The sources of joy for Lee are his beloved wife Gail and granddaughter, Serena. Highly respected by everyone in the community, Lee always comes down on the right side of the law.

In May 2013, Scott opted not to invite Lee, Gail, & Serena to his & Laura's wedding, but rather keep it small and intimate. Their second attempt at marriage ended in divorce soon afterwards due to her pre-occupation with Luke's ongoing problems.

=== 2017 ===
On July 13, 2017, Lucy comes to Scott to report Lee's passing (actor Peter Hansen died on April 9).
