= Audrey Hardy =

Fictional character

- General Hospital character
- Rachel Ames as Audrey Hardy
- Portrayed by: Rachel Ames; Maura McGiveney (temp. 1971)
- Duration: 1964–2007; 2009; 2013; 2015
- First appearance: February 23, 1964
- Last appearance: October 30, 2015
- Created by: Frank and Doris Hursley
- Introduced by: James Young
- Book appearances: Robin's Diary
- Spin-off appearances: Port Charles
In-universe information
- Other names: Audrey March
- Occupation: Registered nurse Head of Student Nurses at General Hospital; Flight attendant
- Family: Hardy
- Sisters: Lucille Weeks; Edith Logan
- Spouse: Steve Hardy (1965–67, 1976, 1977–96); Tom Baldwin (1967–77); Jim Hobart (1971–76)
- Sons: Tom Hardy
- Stepsons: Jeff Webber (1977–96)
- Grandchildren: Tommy Hardy; Steve Webber (step); Sarah Webber (step); Elizabeth Webber (step); Hayden Barnes (step)
- Nieces: Anne Logan

Audrey Hardy is a fictional character on the ABC soap opera, General Hospital. She has been portrayed by Rachel Ames on a contract basis from 1964 to 2002, and on a recurring basis from 2002 to 2007, making guest appearances in 2009, 2013, and 2015.

== Casting ==
Rachel Ames originated the role of Audrey in 1964 in what was originally a thirteen-week stint with an option for an additional thirteen weeks. The character debuted in the episode that originally aired on February 23, 1964. The character's popularity prompted the series to keep the character on canvas. Ames took an extended leave in 1970 when she had to be put on bedrest during her pregnancy. Maura McGiveney played Audrey temporarily while Ames was gone.

Ames also crossed over to General Hospital's spinoff series Port Charles as Audrey in 1997. In 2002, Ames was dropped to recurring status, and ultimately retired from the series in October 2007. Ames briefly reprised the role for a couple of episodes in October 2009 and reprised the role once again in April 2013 for the series' 50th anniversary.

Ames once again reprised her role as Audrey on October 30, 2015.

== Storylines ==
=== 1964–1989 ===
Audrey March arrives at General Hospital in 1964 to visit her sister, Lucille March (Lucille Wall). She is a registered nurse, who had forsaken the profession for that of an airline stewardess. After noticing Dr. Steve Hardy (John Beradino), the Chief of Internal Medicine at General Hospital, Audrey stays in town and becomes a private nurse. Eventually, Steve and Audrey get engaged, but Audrey breaks it off. She accepts a proposal from one of her clients, Randy Washborn. Audrey is diagnosed with lymphoma, and when Randy deserts her she gets back together with Steve. They marry in 1965 after she is recovered. Audrey later works on a book with Dr. Phil Brewer, but the experience ends badly when Phil tries to seduce her. Audrey becomes concerned when she does not conceive, and believing Steve is sterile, Audrey has herself artificially inseminated without Steve's knowledge and becomes pregnant. Audrey is in a car accident and miscarries; she is devastated and separates from Steve. She goes to Vietnam to help war orphans in March 1968.

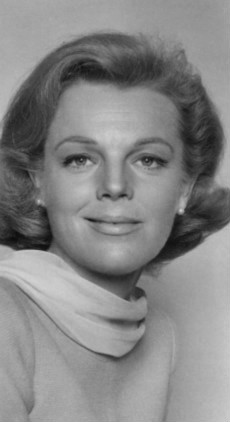
Rachel Ames in 1973.

When Audrey returns from Vietnam in January 1969, she continues to push Steve away and after their divorce is final, she marries Tom Baldwin in an effort to prove that she is over Steve. Audrey cannot bring herself to sleep with Tom, and he ends up raping her. After becoming pregnant with Tom's child, Audrey files for divorce and leaves town, determined to protect her unborn child from her violent husband. She returns in 1971, and tells Lucille her son had died at birth. Audrey reconnects with Steve. It is revealed she is lying about her son, whom she named Steve and is in hiding. She plans to remarry Steve, and then convince him to adopt a baby which would be her son. However, Mrs. Peggy Nelson, the woman taking care of the baby, realizes the plan and blackmails Audrey. Peggy Nelson is murdered and Audrey is accused of the crime. Thanks to Steve, Audrey is acquitted. Tom reclaims baby Steve, who is renamed Tommy, forcing Audrey to resume their marriage. Tom kidnaps baby Tommy and flees to Mexico. Tom is later presumed dead and Tommy is returned to Audrey. During the kidnapping ordeal, Tommy had become ill with a heart ailment. Jim Hobart performs surgery and Tommy recovers. Audrey feels gratitude towards Jim and marries him after he injuries his hands and fears he cannot operate again. Audrey faces heartache as she still loves Steve and Jim turns to alcohol to deal with his injury. In 1976, Jim leaves Audrey for a younger woman. Audrey attempts suicide and Steve saves her. Steve proposes to Audrey and she accepts. Steve falls down a flight of stairs and Audrey helps him recuperate. They remarry, and Tom Baldwin returns alive, invalidating their marriage. Tom tries to reclaim Audrey and his son, but eventually gives up and leaves town. Steve and Audrey marry again in 1977 and Steve officially adopts Tommy, renamed Tom Hardy

Meanwhile, Audrey had become head of student nurses at General Hospital, and as a result becomes a mentor to nurses such as Bobbie Spencer. Steve and Audrey become involved in various dramas involving the children of Steve's old friend Lars Webber, Terri, Rick and Jeff. Jeff ends up shooting himself, and when he is in the hospital, Terri tells Steve about a letter her mother, Helene, had told her about on her deathbed. Steve finds the letter and learns Jeff is actually his biological son (Steve had relationship with Helene during a time when she was separated from Lars). Steve tells Audrey and they agree to keep the truth a secret. In the winter of 1979, Port Charles is hit by an epidemic of Lassa Fever. General Hospital is placed under quarantine, and when Steve begins to fall victim to the disease, Audrey tells Jeff the truth. Steve recovers and both Rick and Jeff are angry at Steve and Audrey. It takes months for everyone to reconcile. Steve and Audrey are happy to learn that Jeff's son Steven Lars Webber is still alive. Jeff soon leaves town with his son to make a fresh start.

Some years later, Tom leaves to attend college and returns in 1987. When Tom marries an African-American doctor, Simone Ravelle, Audrey fears her son's interracial marriage would not be accepted. In time, Audrey and Simone grow close. Simone confides in Audrey when she gets pregnant during an affair with Harrison and does not know who the father is. However, Audrey is relieved when Tom is confirmed to be the little Tommy's father.

=== 1990s ===
In 1993, Audrey organizes a surprise party for Steve's 30th anniversary at General Hospital. Audrey is attacked by psychopath Ryan Chamberlain, who mistakes her for his abusive mother. Audrey quickly recovers and testifies against Ryan at his trial, causing him to be committed to a mental institution. When Tom and Simone divorce in 1995, Audrey disapproves of Simone's relationship with Justus Ward. The following year, Audrey is devastated when her beloved Steve dies of a heart attack. Audrey is comforted by Gail Baldwin, Monica Quartermaine, and Kevin Collins during this difficult time. Steve's death causes strain between Audrey and Tom, who believes the Cassadine family is responsible for bankrupting the hospital and causing stress that caused Steve's heart attack. Tom joins forces with Luke Spencer to bring the Cassadines down, but Audrey refuses to believe they are responsible. Tom eventually leaves town.

In 1997, Audrey is attacked during a hostage crisis at General Hospital. Jeff's daughter, Sarah Webber, comes to help Audrey recover and moves in with her. Her younger sister Elizabeth Webber quickly follows and moves in as well. Elizabeth is raped on Valentine's Day in 1998, and Audrey tries to help her by telling her to move on. Sarah confronts Audrey about her attitude and Audrey reveals her own rape to Sarah and later Elizabeth. Elizabeth and Audrey become closer and go to therapy with Gail Baldwin to help each other. Audrey is upset when Elizabeth runs away with Lucky Spencer, but eventually accepts their relationship. Audrey consoles Elizabeth through Lucky's supposed death.

=== 2000s ===
Audrey stays extremely close with Elizabeth throughout the years and supports her through Lucky's return and brainwashing, Elizabeth's turbulent marriage to Ric Lansing, and her one-night stand with Zander Smith that results in Audrey's first great-grandchild Cameron.

On the 10,000th episode that aired on April 17, 2002, the staff throws a surprise party for Audrey honoring her 10,000th shift as a nurse. Afterwards Audrey is seen sparingly, and officially retires from the Hospital in 2005. She returns for the wedding of Elizabeth and Lucky that October. When Elizabeth and Lucky separate in 2006, Elizabeth moves in with Audrey until they reconcile. In October 2009, Audrey is seen at Lucky and Elizabeth's engagement party. Audrey is referenced in off-screen activities as continuing to live in Port Charles, frequently interacting with her grandchildren and great-grandchildren and enjoying her life as a retiree.

In April 2013, Audrey makes an on-screen appearance on what would have been Steve's 50th anniversary at General Hospital. Audrey talks with Elizabeth and they discuss Tom being in Africa, Elizabeth's parents being in Asia, and Tommy getting his medical degree. Audrey makes an appearance when she writes to her granddaughter, Elizabeth, for her upcoming wedding to Jake Doe/Jason Morgan.

== Reception ==
In the pre-Gloria Monty years of GH, Audrey was one of the leading characters of the show, and a 1971 storyline in which she was accused of murder sent General Hospital to the number one spot in the daytime ratings for the first time.
