= Leslie Motor Car company =

The Leslie Motor Car company was a motor car company located in Detroit, Michigan in 1916. This automobile company was most likely named for the city of Leslie, Michigan. It was in operation for only one year and produced an unknown number of cars. Most cars of this era, were sold or given by their owners for scrap metal drives during World War II.
