= Jana Taylor =

American actress (1943–2003)

- Taylor in General Hospital, 1963
- Born: Jana L. Taylor; July 27, 1943; Far Rockaway, Queens, New York, U.S.
- Died: April 27, 2004 (aged 60); Venice, Los Angeles, California, U.S.
- Occupation: Actress
- Years active: 1961–1993
- Spouses: Michael R. Sinclair (m. 1969; div. 1970) Louis Michael Perretta (m. 1976; died 1985)
- Children: Michael Perretta

Jana Taylor (July 27, 1943 – April 27, 2004) was an American actress best known for her role as Angie Costello on the ABC soap opera General Hospital.

== Early life ==
Taylor was born on July 27, 1943, in Far Rockaway, Queens, New York. She began taking ballet lessons when she was 4 years old. She was educated at elementary schools on Long Island before she and her parents moved to Phoenix, Arizona. After that, they moved to California. With her parents' encouragement she began taking acting lessons when she was 13 years old.

== Career ==
=== Dancing ===
Taylor danced with the Southern California Ballet Company, and by age 19 she was a member of the Los Angeles City Ballet. She performed a modern Jazz dance on Steve Allen's television program.

=== Acting ===
She started her career in the 1961 film A Cold Wind in August as Alice. Also in 1961, Taylor was uncredited as Elsa Scheffler in 1961's Judgment at Nuremberg. She was Abigale in 1967's Hells Angels on Wheels. Taylor's last film was 1984's Dreamscape as Mrs. Webber. Her biggest role was Angie Costello in the ABC soap opera General Hospital from 1963 to 1965 as an original cast member. Taylor guest starred in such television series as Perry Mason, The Gallant Men, Get Smart, Run for Your Life, The Wild Wild West, and The Interns. She had a recurring role on Make Room for Granddaddy as Susan McAdams Williams. Taylor ended her acting career with a guest appearance back on General Hospital on April 1, 1993, for its 30th anniversary.

=== Photography and philanthropy ===
Taylor had a production and photography studio located at 713 Palms Boulevard Venice, Los Angeles, 90291 since 1989. She was committed to showing disadvantaged children how to work a camera. Taylor's son now owns the business.

== Personal life and death ==
Taylor married Michael R. Sinclair in 1969 and divorced him in 1970. She then married Louis Michael Perretta of Italian American descent in 1976. In that same year on December 10, they gave birth to rapper Michael "Evidence" Perretta, who is the lead member of his group Dilated Peoples. Taylor died on April 27, 2004, of cancer in Venice, Los Angeles.

== Filmography ==
=== Film ===
Year	Title	Role	Notes
1961	A Cold Wind in August	Alice	Low-budget independent drama film directed by Alexander Singer and adapted from the eponymous novel by Burton Wohl.
1961	Judgment at Nuremberg	Elsa Scheffler	Courtroom drama film directed by Stanley Kramer and written by Abby Mann.; Uncredited
1967	Hells Angels on Wheels	Abigale	Biker film directed by Richard Rush.
1984	Dreamscape	Mrs. Webber	Science fiction–adventure horror film directed by Joseph Ruben and written by David Loughery, with Chuck Russell and Ruben co-writing.

=== Television ===
Year	Title	Role	Notes
1962	Perry Mason	Merle Telford	Episode: "The Case of the Lonely Eloper" (S 5:Ep 30)
1963	The Gallant Men	Carla	Episode: "The Bridge" (S 1:Ep 17)
1963–65	General Hospital	Angie Costello	Contract role
1967	Occasional Wife	Renata	Episode: "Instant Fatherhood" (S 1:Ep 24)
1967	Get Smart	Isabella	Episode: "Viva Smart" (S 3:Ep 2)
1967	The Danny Thomas Hour	Susan McAdams Williams	Episode: "Make More Room for Daddy" (S 1:Ep 8)
1968	Run for Your Life	Mary Kendall	Episode: "Carol" (S 3:Ep 24)
1968	The Mod Squad	Susan	Episode: "Find Tara Chapman!" (S 1:Ep 7)
1969	The Wild Wild West	Alicia Crane	Episode: "The Night of the Bleak Island" (S4:Ep21)
1970	Then Came Bronson	Betty Webber	Episode: "A-Pickin' an' A-Singin'" (S 1:Ep 16)
1970	Medical Center	Janet Johns	Episode: "A Duel with Doom" (S 1:Ep 18)
1970	The Interns	Pam	Episode: "Death Wish" (S 1:Ep 2)
1970–71	Make Room for Granddaddy	Susan McAdams Williams	Recurring
1993	General Hospital	Angie Costello-Weeks	30th Anniversary episode
