= Emily McLaughlin =

American actress (1928–1991)

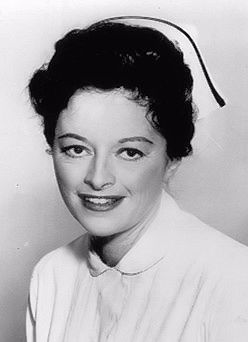
- McLaughlin as Jessie Brewer, 1967
- Born: December 1, 1928; White Plains, New York, U.S.
- Died: April 26, 1991 (aged 62); Los Angeles, California, U.S.
- Education: Middlebury College
- Occupation: Actress
- Spouses: Robert Lansing (m. 1956; div. 1968) Jeffrey Hunter (m. 1969; died 1969)
- Children: 2
- Father: Frederick C. McLaughlin

Emily McLaughlin (December 1, 1928 – April 26, 1991) was an American actress, known for her long-standing role as original character Nurse Jessie Brewer on the daytime series General Hospital from 1963 until 1991.

== Early life ==
McLaughlin was born in White Plains, New York, where her father, Frederick C. McLaughlin, was mayor. She was educated at Middlebury College, and after studying drama, began performing in Broadway and off-Broadway productions.

== Career ==
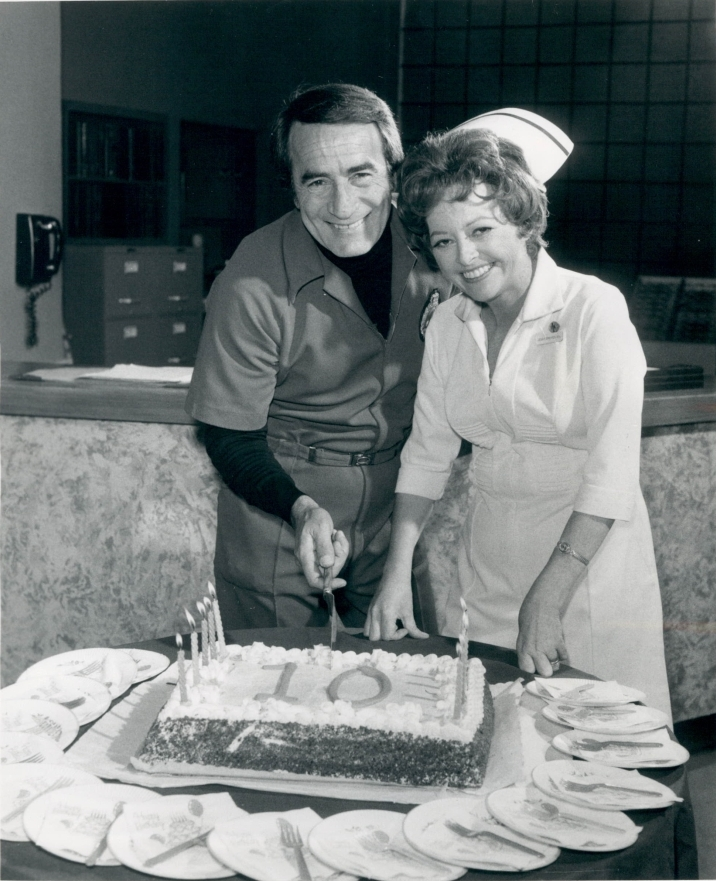
McLaughlin and John Beradino at the 10th anniversary of General Hospital, 1973

McLaughlin made her television debut in 1959, with regular role of Eileen Seaton on Young Doctor Malone. In 1961, she moved to Hollywood and had guest-starring roles on anthology dramas The Twilight Zone, Studio One, and Kraft Television Theatre.

=== General Hospital ===
From 1963 to 1991, McLaughlin starred in General Hospital as Nurse Jessie Brewer. She was cast as one of the original leading actresses on the series. Registered nurse Jessie Brewer spoke the opening line of the premiere episode, "Seventh floor, nurses station", a phrase that became a staple in the show's early years. The series' original premise centered around the drama of Brewer and Dr. Steve Hardy's personal lives and experiences at General Hospital.

== Awards ==
In 1974, McLaughlin received a nomination for a Golden Globe Award for Best Actress – Television Series Drama for her role. She became the first and only actress nominated for a Golden Globe Award for a role on the daytime series.

Her character in General Hospital was seen less and less during the 1980s. Although she wanted the steady work and to keep her job, her failing health made it difficult. She eventually was demoted to day-player status, but still retained her billing at the top of the cast crawl, behind only John Beradino as Dr. Steve Hardy. Toward the end of her life, she was shown on the serial a few times a year, and her last appearance on the show aired on March 1, 1991 when Jessie attended the funeral of a character named Dawn Winthrop. On April 26, 1991, McLaughlin died of cancer, aged 62. She is interred next to second husband Jeffrey Hunter in the Glen Haven Memorial Park cemetery in Sylmar, California.

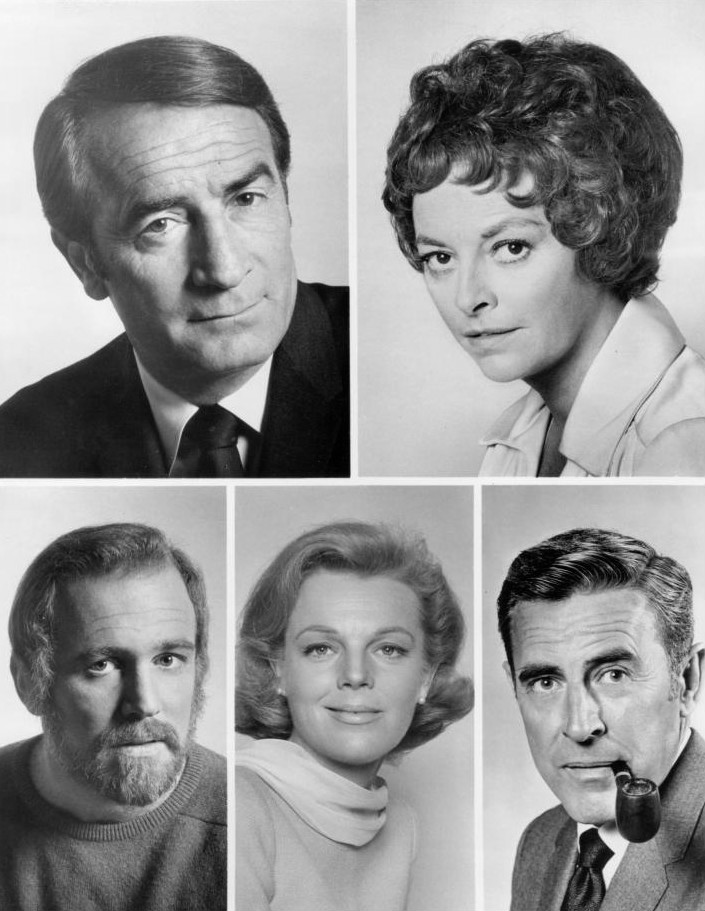
Cast of General Hospital 1973 (top):John Beradino, Emily McLaughlin (bottom): Martin West, Rachel Ames, Peter Hansen

After her death, co-star John Beradino announced at the end of a General Hospital episode that McLaughlin had died. However, the character Jessie Brewer never was written out; she simply disappeared without explanation. Not until years later, during an anniversary episode, did Dr. Steve Hardy mention that Jessie had died.

== Personal life ==
McLaughlin was married to actor Robert Lansing from 1956 to 1968, with whom she had a son. After their divorce, she married actor Jeffrey Hunter in February 1969. Three months after the marriage, Hunter died of a cerebral hemorrhage on May 27 at age 42.

On April 26, 1991, McLaughlin died of cancer, aged 62. She is interred next to second husband Jeffrey Hunter in the Glen Haven Memorial Park cemetery in Sylmar, California.

In 1994, McLaughlin's daughter Mary Ann Anderson wrote and published Portrait of a Soap Star: The Emily McLaughlin Story.

== Filmography ==
Year	Title	Role	Notes
1959-1960	Young Doctor Malone	Dr. Eileen Seaton	series regular
1960	The Twilight Zone	Doris Richards	episode: "The Jungle"
1962	Checkmate	Sue Stoner	episode: "The Bold and the Tough"
1962	The Eleventh Hour	Myra Williams	episode: "The Seventh Day of Creation"
1963-1991	General Hospital	Nurse Jessie Brewer	series regular nominated—Golden Globe Award for Best Actress – Television Series Drama (1974)
1966	The Man Who Never Was	Kleiner	episode: "Pay Now, Pray Later"
1982	Young Doctors in Love	Cameo	
