= Scott Baldwin =

Fictional character from General Hospital

- General Hospital character
- Kin Shriner as Scott Baldwin
- Portrayed by: Johnny Whitaker (1965–1966); Teddy Quinn (1966); Tony Camp (1969–1972); Don Clarke (1973–1974); Johnny Jensen (1974–1975); Kin Shriner (1977–2024)
- Duration: 1965–1966; 1969–1975; 1977–1984; 1987–1993; 1997–2004; 2007–2008; 2013–2024
- First appearance: September 24, 1965
- Last appearance: August 16, 2024
- Created by: Frank and Doris Hursley
- Introduced by: James Young (1965); Tom Donovan (1977)
- Spin-off appearances: Port Charles
In-universe information
- Other names: Scott Bentley
- Occupation: Lawyer; Port Charles district attorney (2002–2004, 2015)
- Father: David Bordisso
- Mother: Meg Baldwin
- Adoptive father: Lee Baldwin
- Stepfather: Lloyd Bentley
- Stepmother: Gail Baldwin
- Half-sisters: Brooke Bentley (legal)
- Spouse: Laura Webber (1979–1981, 2013–2014); Susan Moore (1982–1983); Dominique Stanton (1992–1993); Lucy Coe (2000–2001)
- Sons: Franco Baldwin; Logan Hayes
- Daughters: Karen Wexler; Serena Baldwin
- Adoptive daughters: Christina Baldwin
- Uncles: Tom Baldwin (adoptive); Mark Bordisso
- First cousins: Tom Hardy (adoptive)

Scott "Scotty" Baldwin is a fictional character from the ABC soap opera General Hospital and its now-defunct spinoff Port Charles. The character debuted played by child actors in the 1960s until Kin Shriner assumed the role in 1977. Scotty is often remembered as part of the love triangle with Luke and Laura Spencer; when Scott's wife Laura Webber left him for Luke Spencer, his devastation led to a drastic personality change, and the character became one of General Hospital's long-running villains. However, on Port Charles, the character was portrayed in a more heroic sense.

== Casting ==
The character was originated as a child in the 1960s, played by the child actor Johnny Whitaker in 1965. He was succeeded by Teddy Quinn in 1966, Tony Camp from 1969 to 1972, Don Clarke from 1973 to 1974, and Johnny Jensen from 1974 to 1975.

The character of Scott is most commonly associated with Kin Shriner, who assumed the role beginning August 2, 1977. Shriner left the series briefly on September 19, 1980 to play Jeb Hampton on Texas, and returned in 1982 for a one-year contract. He returned again on November 27, 1987, and left on December 24, 1993. Shriner reprised the role in 1997 on the spinoff Port Charles. He left Port Charles in 2001 and returned to the original series, until his departure in 2004. Shriner returned in 2007 and departed again in November 2008. With the departure of actress Rachel Ames as Audrey Hardy, Scott became the oldest character (in real time) appearing on General Hospital, having been introduced in 1965.

On January 14, 2013, it was announced that Shriner would return to General Hospital on February 19, making him the latest in a slew of returning fan favorites.

== Development ==
When Kin Shriner assumed the role in 1977, Scotty is a respectable young adult. He enters law school and has a promising future with his career and young love Laura Weber. The two marry in 1979. However, when Laura is raped by Luke Spencer and subsequently falls in love with Luke, Scotty's devastation hardens his character. Laura leaves him and marries Luke in 1981. Scotty leaves town as Shriner left the series to pursue other opportunities. Executive Producer at the time Gloria Monty asked him to return a year later, ready to turn his character into a "rat." Scott becomes known for lying and scheming. Fans accepted the change, both because he was more interesting to watch, and because they understood the character's past and felt that the betrayal of both the love of his life (Laura) and one of his good friends (Luke) left him a broken man, and in turn caused him to become bitter and jaded about the world. Shiner explained in 1982:

I haven't gotten any flak for being a bad guy. People feel Scotty's behavior is justified because of his past. How would a guy feel when his woman (Laura) is raped, and then becomes involved with the rapist? No man is going to be the same after that.

== Storylines ==
=== 1965–75 ===
The young Scotty Bentley first came to Port Charles with his mother Meg Bentley and stepsister Brooke, after the death of his father Lloyd. There was a lot of family strife in the first couple of years as Meg became engaged to the dashing Dr. Noel Clinton, sending Brooke into a tailspin. Brooke never liked her stepmother Meg and felt that the engagement to Noel was a slap in the face to her dead father. In retaliation, Brooke seduced Noel, and the two left town and wed. Meg was devastated. A short time later, she met and married Lee Baldwin. Lee adopted Scotty, and the three became a family. Unfortunately, Meg developed breast cancer and had to have a radical mastectomy. The illness caused Meg to have a mental breakdown, and Lee had no choice but to put her in a sanitarium where she died soon thereafter. Lee now had to raise Scotty on his own. Scotty eventually left the show (went away to law school) for a time.

=== 1977–83 ===
When he returned, he obtained a job at the hospital, where he met the young Laura Webber. They fell in love and, after many obstacles (including the manipulations of Scotty's on-again/off-again lover and Laura's nemesis Bobbie Spencer), they finally married, but their happiness was short-lived. Laura went to work at the Campus Disco for Bobbie's shady brother Luke, who became obsessed with Laura and eventually raped her. In spite of this, Laura fell in love with Luke, ran off with him, and later divorced Scotty after less than two years of marriage.

In 1981, at Luke and Laura's wedding, Scotty showed a darker side, as he caught the bridal bouquet and announced he was contesting his divorce from Laura. Since then, although Scott's more scrupulous side has re-emerged more than once, he always returned to engaging in underhanded and often illegal activities, even as district attorney of Port Charles. He has had several brief relationships, and in 1982 married Susan Moore, supposedly for financial reasons while he began an affair with Heather Webber. Susan was the mistress of the wealthy Alan Quartermaine, who with Susan had a son, Jason, with a considerable trust fund. Susan was murdered, and Jason was then raised by Alan and his wife Monica. Scott left Port Charles soon afterward.

=== 1987–2004 ===
Scott returned in 1987 and helped to destroy Bobbie's marriage to Jake Meyer, before becoming involved in an off-on relationship with Lucy Coe. The two remained good friends, even after Scott married Dominique Stanton, and Lucy offered to be a surrogate mother for Dominique when Dominique learned that she was dying. Sometime after Dominique died, Lucy gave birth to their child, whom Scott named Serena, after Dominique's beloved childhood home Serenity. After an ill-advised engagement to Katherine Bell, Scotty left town once again in late December 1993, then returned to Port Charles in 1997.

Scotty has a seat on the board of General Hospital, which he received after negotiating a solution to a nurses strike. He was also Luke's attorney during the murder trial of Stefan Cassadine, although they fought constantly about how to handle the case, and as a result of Felicia's testimony, the case caused great strain in Luke and Laura's relationship. Scotty used this as an opportunity to continue manipulating all things Laura, and they eventually started dating again. Luke was still in the picture though, which caused extreme jealousy on Scott's part. He pushed Laura to finalize her divorce with Luke, and then Scotty and Laura traveled to Hollywood together. Much of the storyline revolved around Scotty's struggle to suppress his jealousy of Luke, out of his genuine desire that Laura return to him willingly. Scotty did eventually blurt out a marriage proposal to Laura, but she ended up choosing Luke instead of him. Scotty couldn't talk her out of it, and eventually turned to his ex-girlfriend, Bobbie Spencer.

When Luke and Laura were planning their new wedding, Laura's adoptive father, Dr. Rick Webber, returned to town. Scott and Rick had some kind of shared secret, and Rick pulled strings to help Scott get elected to a position as District Attorney. It seemed that Laura was starting to remember something, and Scott and Rick went to the Scorpios' yard, where they dug up the human skeleton of Rick's old mistress, who had been killed (accidentally) by Laura. When Laura remembered and tried to confront Rick, he died from a blow to the head. Scott tried to pin the blame on Luke (supposedly because he feared that Laura had done it), and played on Luke's guilt that he may have caused Laura's mental breakdown by pushing her to remember. Luke was sentenced to life in prison but escaped and left town.

Bobbie eventually broke up with Scott, because of his dirty tactics against Alexis in the run for D.A. Later, Luke returned to town and was arrested again. But Nikolas Cassadine had obtained tapes of Laura confessing to Rick Webber's murder, and Alexis used the tapes to force Scott to drop the charges against Luke, in return for Alexis dropping out of the election. Scotty then had Luke committed to an asylum, for what he had done to Laura. Scott was an extremely corrupt DA, frequently using his position to take action against his enemies, and at one point even ordered Luke arrested by his own son, Lucky.

During the storyline with the Port Charles Hotel fire, Scotty faked his own death in order to steal a treasure from Skye. He was faced with an investigation by Internal Affairs and fled the city with the money, presumably leaving with his daughter Serena. From an offshore tropical beach paradise he sent Luke a farewell videotape, taunting him.

=== 2007–2008 ===
In 2007, Scott returns, and it is revealed that he had frequently been visiting the comatose Laura. In March, Luke's daughter Lulu Spencer and stepson Dillon Quartermaine intercept a letter from Alan Quartermaine to Luke. In the event of his death, he had the letter sent identifying Scott as Rick Webber's killer. Soon afterward, Scott visits Laura and confesses to her. He explains that he had gone to see Laura that night and heard screaming coming from the attic. When he got inside he saw Rick trying to inject Laura, so he had grabbed a candlestick and hit him over the head, unintentionally killing him. He left, and by the time Luke got there, Laura had been so far gone that she didn't remember Scott's having been there. Lulu had already told her mother the truth, unsuccessfully hoping it would bring Laura out of her catatonic state. Meanwhile, an ex Iraqi soldier, Logan Hayes, comes to Port Charles and it is eventually revealed that Scott had fathered a son in Texas around the same time that Logan was born. Logan admits he had found letters Scott had written to his mother, and a DNA test proves they are father and son.

In the beginning of 2008, Scott and Logan have a rift when Scott accuses Logan of taking police files to blackmail Johnny Zacchara, in order to keep him away from Lulu, whom Logan is trying to win back. Scott puts pressure on Alexis Davis to hand over her job as District Attorney to him. In July, Lulu kills Logan in self-defense, devastating Scott. Johnny takes the blame for Lulu, and Scott is the prosecutor in his trial. He uses dirty tricks to get Johnny the death penalty, including forging papers stating his son was working undercover for the police. Scott calls to the stand Lulu, who has become mentally unstable from the ordeal. Johnny is acquitted, and Scott is enraged.

When Scott finds out Lulu was the killer, he threatens her in front of Laura, who awakens and defends her daughter. Scott then kidnaps Laura and takes her to Los Angeles, to relive their honeymoon. Luke, Tracy, Nikolas, Lucky, and Lulu pursue them and bring her home. As Laura boards a plane to France to seek further treatment, Scott is seen behind her on the plane. It is presumed he has gone to live in Paris near Laura and his daughter, Serena.

=== 2013–present ===
In February 2013, Scott resurfaces in Port Charles, revealing to a bewildered Luke that he and Laura are engaged. Scott's return to town also coincides with the appearance of a replica of the infamous Ice Princess Diamond, which had been addressed to Lulu on Valentine's Day. Scott than tries to marry Laura before Luke tries to get Laura back. Scott succeeds, but Laura spends a great time away with Luke, after Lulu is kidnapped. When Laura finally does return, Scott asks her for a divorce, saying it is best for both of them. He then focuses his energies on winning back his old position as district attorney of Port Charles.

Scott is given incriminating evidence on his running mate, Lazaro, with resident mob boss, Sonny Corinthos. Scott approaches Lazaro, who bows out of the race. After notifying the mayor Scott is named district attorney. As his first act as D.A. he attempts to send Heather Webber back into custody along with serial-killer, Franco, for fraud and aiding and abetting Webber during Robin Scorpio's kidnapping. Heather contests the charges and confesses that Franco is Scott's son. Back when Laura had requested a divorce from Scott, he was consumed with anger and grief, and had gotten intoxicated at Kelly's one night. Heather, who was also drunk, had found him there, and that is when Franco was conceived. Scott doesn't believe it, but Heather has a birth certificate and D.N.A. tests to back up her claim. Scott realizes that Heather is telling the truth but laments the fact that his career is over because of what will come out about his familial connections.

On January 8, 2014, it was mentioned that Scott had finalized his divorce from Laura. Scott also told Lucy that after their one night stand his feelings for her have returned, because he was never tricked by Jerry Jacks.

He gains Cameron, Aiden, and Jake Spencer as his step-grandsons by his son Franco's marriage to Elizabeth Webber.

== Reception ==
In 2023, Charlie Mason from Soaps She Knows placed Scotty #11 on his ranked list of General Hospital’s 40+ Greatest Characters of All Time, commenting that "It’s no wonder this rascally attorney’s hair is always fantastically askew: Next to the wisecracks in his head are countless plots, both the cajillions that he’s already hatched and executed, and — dare we hope? — the many that are yet to come."
