= Leslie, West Virginia =

- Unincorporated community
- Location within West Virginia Location within the United States
- Coordinates: 38°02′40″N 80°43′22″W
- Country: United States
- State: West Virginia
- County: Greenbrier
- Elevation: 2,841 ft (866 m)
- Time zone: UTC-5 (Eastern (EST))
  - Summer (DST): UTC-4 (EDT)
- ZIP code: 25972
- Area codes: 304 & 681
- GNIS feature ID: 1554944

Leslie is an unincorporated community in Greenbrier County, West Virginia, United States. Leslie is located on West Virginia Route 20, southwest of Quinwood.
