= Phil Brewer =

Fictional character from General Hospital

Dr. Phil Brewer
- General Hospital character
- Roy Thinnes in Episode 1 (1963)
- Portrayed by: Roy Thinnes (1963–1965); Rick Falk (1965–1966); Robert J. Hogan (1966–1967); Ron Hayes (1967); Craig Huebing (1967); Martin West (1967–1975); Ryan Carnes (2015 flashback)
- Duration: 1963–1975; 2015
- First appearance: April 1, 1963
- Last appearance: 1975; April 1, 2015 (flashback)
- Introduced by: James Young
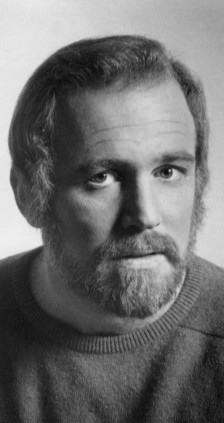
- Martin West (1973)
In-universe information
- Other names: Harold Williamson
- Occupation: Physician
- Wife: Jessie Brewer (1963–1966, 1968–1971)
- Children: Nancy Brewer; Tracy Taylor; Martha Taylor; Unnamed child (miscarriage)

Phil Brewer is a fictional character from the ABC Daytime soap opera General Hospital. Roy Thinnes originated the role during the show's premiere.

== Storylines ==
In 1963, Jessie Brewer, is married to Dr. Phil Brewer, an intern, who is seven years younger than her. Jessie sacrifices a lot to help him become a cardiologist. Phil is a philandering husband and has an affair with Cynthia Allison. Jessie files for divorce in 1964. Jessie finds out she is pregnant, and Phil leaves Cynthia. Jessie miscarries and they split up again. In 1965, an inebriated Phil rapes Jessie and she becomes pregnant again. Their child is born with a terminal heart ailment and dies. Jessie and Phil divorce. Jessie marries Dr. John Prentice, who shortly dies and Jessie is a suspect. Phil and Jessie reunite during the ordeal and prove her innocence. They remarry, but when Phil is accused of murdering John's daughter Polly, he leaves Port Charles and is presumed dead in a plane crash.

In 1970, Phil is seen alive and using the alias "Harold Williamson." Deciding he is not good enough for Jessie, Phil finds comfort with Diana Maynard. Phil gets in a car accident and sees Jessie at the hospital. Jessie annuls her marriage to Peter Taylor and resumes her life with Phil. In 1971, Phil finds out that Diana has given birth to his son, whom she named Tracy, while married to Peter. Phil rapes Diana and she becomes pregnant again, but tells Peter he is the father. Peter eventually found out that Phil was Martha's father. Phil gives up on Diana and leaves. He later returns, when Augusta McLeod writes to tell him that she is carrying Peter's baby. Phil saw the opportunity to win Diana's love and told Peter. In 1974, nurse Jane Dawson finds Jessie Brewer hugging Phil's dead body. There are five suspects, and Jessie is charged with his murder. Diana Taylor suddenly confesses to protect Peter. Dr. Jim Hobart remembers seeing Augusta with Phil that night, and Peter badgers Augusta into a confession. Augusta is convicted and goes to prison. Her baby is placed in a foster home, and when she is released she leaves town.

On April 1, 2015, Phil Brewer was seen in a flashback played by current General Hospital actor Ryan Carnes, who was at the time playing Lucas Jones on the show.
