= Jasper Jacks =

Fictional character from General Hospital, an American soap opera on the ABC network

- General Hospital character
- Ingo Rademacher as Jasper Jacks
- Portrayed by: Ingo Rademacher (1996–2021); Gideon Emery (2008)
- Duration: 1996–2013; 2016–2017; 2019–2021
- First appearance: January 31, 1996
- Last appearance: November 22, 2021
- Created by: Claire Labine and Matthew Labine
- Introduced by: Wendy Riche (1996); Frank Valentini (2016, 2019)
- Book appearances: The Secret Life of Damian Spinelli
- Spin-off appearances: General Hospital: Twist of Fate (1996)
In-universe information
- Occupation: Hotelier; Corporate raider; Shareholder of ELQ Industries
- Parents: John Jacks; Jane Jacks
- Brothers: Jerry Jacks
- Wife: Miranda Jamison (until 1997); Brenda Barrett (1996); Alexis Davis (1999–2000); Skye Quartermaine (2002–2003); Courtney Matthews (2005–2006); Carly Corinthos (2007–2013)
- Daughters: Josslyn Jacks

Jasper "Jax" Jacks is a fictional character from General Hospital, an American soap opera on the ABC network. He has been portrayed mainly by actor Ingo Rademacher since 1996. The role was temporarily played by Gideon Emery during Rademacher's absence from the show in January 2008. The character gained popularity due to a love triangle storyline involving him and the supercouple Sonny Corinthos and Brenda Barrett. When Brenda left the show, the love triangle continued with Sonny and Carly Benson.

== Casting and production ==
The role was debuted by German-born Australian actor Ingo Rademacher on January 31, 1996. In April 2000, Rademacher announced his decision to not sign a new contract with the series and not return to the role. On his departure, Rademacher said in a statement, "I haven't really built up my resumé. I think [daytime] was a good move. And especially being on General Hospital, the best daytime show, I think. But there are other things I'd like to do." Following his departure, the actor signed onto the NBC prime time series Titans. In April 2001, it was rumored that Rademacher would be coming back to General Hospital, despite being interested in the role of "Colin" on the NBC Daytime soap opera Days of Our Lives, a potential love interest of the character Jennifer Horton (Melissa Reeves). That month, there was further speculation that Rademacher would return to the show following the cancellation of Titans and his rumored contract with Days of our Lives falling through. It was confirmed that Rademacher was to return to the series in June 2001. His first reappearance on-screen was on July 30, 2001.

In September 2004, after being quoted saying he was "burned out", Rademacher was rumored to be making an exit from General Hospital once again, but the rumors turned out to be false. In March 2006, a casting call was issued describing a role that greatly resembled Jasper, leading to speculation Rademacher would exit the role, following an impasse with the soap's producers. Three months later, he announced he had signed a one-year deal with the soap.

In May 2011, following a noticeable decline in Jasper's screen time in the series, it was announced that Rademacher had been fired from the series. Rademacher's last episode as a regular aired in July 2011, before his return in August in the first of many guest appearances on the series. In November 2011, it was announced by ABC that Rademacher would make another scheduled guest appearance on the series, this time lasting three weeks. He returned on December 30, 2011, and left the series once again on January 23, 2012.

In August 2012, following the return of Jerry Jacks (Sebastian Roché) on the show, it was announced that Rademacher would once again return to the series as Jasper Jacks. Rademacher made his on-screen return on August 23, 2012, and made his final appearance on September 26, 2012.

An official announcement was made on March 5, 2013, that Rademacher, as well as co-star Vanessa Marcil, would return for the show's 50th anniversary; he appeared during the April 1 episode. On June 2, 2016, it was announced Rademacher would return in a recurring capacity; he was expected to first appear on July 29, but instead returned on August 1 and departed on August 16. Rademacher returned yet again from November 10 to 28, 2016. In March 2017, Frank Valentini confirmed that Rademacher would again reprise his portrayal of Jasper Jacks. He returned from April 3–24, 2017.

On February 14, 2019, Rademacher announced in a video shared on social media that he would return as Jax; he made his re-appearance on May 7, 2019. On November 8, 2021, following speculation, it was announced Rademacher was let go from the soap; his last air-date was November 22, 2021.

== Storylines ==
=== 1990s ===
Jasper "Jax" Jacks arrives in Port Charles, New York, at the behest of Lois Cerullo (Rena Sofer) to help her get her company back from Edward Quartermaine. Despite Lois's happy marriage to Ned Ashton (Wally Kurth), Jax pursues her romantically. Lois introduces him to her best friend Brenda Barrett (Vanessa Marcil), who uses Jax to make her gangster ex-boyfriend Sonny Corinthos (Maurice Benard) jealous. Brenda develops feelings for Jax, and the two wed on his private yacht. When the two decide to renew their vows, Sonny interrupts the ceremony by bringing in Jax's former wife, Miranda Jamison (Leslie Horan), who reveals that her death had been faked to hide scars she suffered in an explosion. Jax decides to move on with Brenda, who in the interim has become engaged to Sonny. Brenda iss left at the altar by Sonny in an attempt to protect her from the dangers of mafia life, and Jax helps her recover from her subsequent breakdown. The two become engaged again, though Brenda appears to die when her mother drives her over a cliff.

=== 1998 ===
Jax learns that his father and his brother Jerry Jacks (Julian Stone) started their family empire with mafia money, and they lose all of their wealth. After gambling in Monte Carlo, Jax begins to rebuild his fortune and meets fashion designer Chloe Morgan (Tava Smiley). Chloe is in danger of losing her design company, and must marry to retain the seed money her eccentric uncle left her. She plans to marry a now-divorced Ned in Las Vegas, and when Chloe's aunt Gertrude objects, Jax marries his best friend and Ned's love interest Alexis Davis (Nancy Lee Grahn) to help cover the ruse. Chloe eventually loses her company, but she and Jax fall in love and Jax buys the company back. Chloe is severely injured when Helena Cassadine (Constance Towers) runs her over in an attempt to kill Alexis. Chloe develops psychic visions tied to Helena, and Helena's son Stefan Cassadine (Stephen Nichols) intends to use these to destroy Helena. Stefan shows Jax a woman who looks just like Brenda, and Jax leaves Port Charles in search of her.

While searching for Brenda, Jax meets Kristina Cassadine (Jaime Ray Newman), realizes that she is Alexis's sister, and reunites them. Chloe rebuffs his advances when she learns he left her to pursue Brenda. Stavros Cassadine (Robert Kelker-Kelly) murders Chloe, who has become involved with Stefan, leaving Jax heartbroken. Jax teams up with Skye Chandler Quartermaine (Robin Christopher) and her brother A. J. Quartermaine (Billy Warlock) to take over ELQ, their family company, and to destroy Sonny. Jax goes into business with Carly Corinthos (Tamara Braun), Sonny's wife, to open a nightclub in an attempt to free her from the mafia. Despite initially disliking Skye, Jax becomes attracted to her, and she pretends to be a damsel in distress to lure to her. They are both concerned when A.J. becomes involved with Sonny's sister Courtney Matthews (Alicia Leigh Willis), and briefly split when Jax learns that Skye had been working with Edward behind his back, but they overcome this obstacle and marry.

The night of his wedding to Skye, Jax is shocked to see Brenda, alive, in his cottage. Brenda explains that she faked her death, fearing that she suffered from the same mental illness as her mother, and that she had been taken in by arms dealer Luis Alcazar (Ted King). When she attempts to leave Luis, he shoots Jax, leaving him paralyzed. Depressed over his condition, Jax pushes Skye away and pretends to still be in love with Brenda. Skye learns that Brenda is not dying and keeps this information from her; when Jax discovers this, he ends their marriage. He tells Brenda the truth and the two become engaged again. Skye begins drinking again and starts an affair with Luis. When Luis is murdered, Skye implicates Brenda and mobster Jason Morgan (Steve Burton), forcing Brenda and Jason to marry so they cannot be forced to testify against each other. Initially found guilty, Brenda is cleared of the charges when it is revealed that Alexis killed Luis, who was responsible for Kristina's death, in order to protect her newborn daughter. Once her marriage to Jason is annulled, Brenda and Jax prepare to wed, but Jax leaves her at the altar when he learns that she kissed Sonny on the day of their wedding. Brenda leaves town, and Skye again pursues Jax, begging him to impregnate her, but Jax chooses to leave town again.

In 2003, Jax returns to town in pursuit of a set of five cards called the Dead Man's Hand, allegedly held by Wild Bill Hickok on the night he was killed. Jax's father had them for most of his life, and believed them to be responsible for his success, losing the will to live when he lost them. Jax meets a grifter named Sam McCall (Kelly Monaco) who is also searching for the cards. The two become attracted to each other while simultaneously sabotaging each other. After they become lovers, Sam steals the cards from Jax. He is unable to return them to his father in time to prevent his death, and blames Sam. They break up and Sam becomes involved with Sonny. Jax reconnects with Sam when he briefly suspects he is the father of her unborn child, but then learns that Sonny is actually the father.

Jax begins to flirt with Sonny's sister Courtney, and the two make a ten million dollar bet that she won't be able to resist his sexual advances. Courtney wins the bet, but the two fall in love. Courtney and Jax marry, but learn that Courtney cannot conceive a child. They decide to use Elizabeth Webber (Rebecca Herbst) as a surrogate, but Courtney regrets this when Jax begins neglecting her in favor of Elizabeth and their child. Courtney begins a friendship with Nikolas Cassadine (Tyler Christopher) that turns into an affair. Courtney becomes pregnant, and Jax changes the paternity test to say that he is the father. Courtney gives birth to a son and dies shortly afterwards. Carly (Laura Wright), begins to help Jax raise his son, and the two begin dating. Carly discovers that Jax is not the father, but keeps quiet to protect the baby from the Cassadines. Carly's longtime nemesis, Robin Scorpio (Kimberly McCullough), learns the truth and reveals it to Nikolas. Jax is then forced to give him the baby, who Nikolas names Spencer Cassadine.

Jax and Carly become engaged. Their wedding is delayed several times, and Jax is forced to leave town to help his brother Jerry. When Sonny shoots mobster Lorenzo Alcazar (Ted King), Carly, who witnessed the act, marries him to avoid testifying against him. After she and Sonny are held hostage at the Metro Court Hotel by the mysterious Mr. Craig, they sleep together and Jax finds out. Jax resolves to fight for Carly, and she chooses a life with him. Carly and Sonny divorce, and Jax and Carly marry. When they return from their honeymoon, Jax learns that Mr. Craig is actually his brother Jerry (Sebastian Roché) who has had plastic surgery. Jerry tricks Jax into getting out of town, but his plan backfires when Jax is kidnapped by Jerry's former lover Irina. She rapes Jax twice, but he is able to escape and return to his life with Carly.

Jax begins a new business venture with fashion editor Kate Howard (Megan Ward), who Carly immediately dislikes. Jax learns that Kate is actually Connie Falconeri, Sonny's high school girlfriend, and she begins dating Sonny. Carly's son Michael (Dylan Cash), wanting to protect his family, purchases a gun and accidentally shoots Kate. He runs away, leaving Carly, Jax, and Sonny fearful that he has been kidnapped by Anthony Zacchara (Bruce Weitz), a new mafia boss in Port Charles. Meanwhile, Carly and Jax learn that Carly is pregnant. Michael returns to town, but he and Carly are injured in an explosion. Ric Lansing (Rick Hearst) rescues Carly, who then suffers from hypothermia. In the hospital, Anthony's daughter Claudia Zacchara (Sarah Joy Brown) threatens Carly in an attempt to protect her brother Johnny Zacchara (Brandon Barash) from Sonny. The stress causes Carly to lose her baby.

Claudia, teaming up with Jerry, orders Ian Devlin to kill Sonny, but the bullet accidentally hits Michael, leaving him in a permanent coma. On the way to bring Michael to a long-term care facility, Carly and Sonny sleep together, the same night that Kate and Jax share a kiss during a business trip. The Jax and Carly split when Jax learns that Carly slept with Sonny, and they begin divorce proceedings, but then reconcile yet again.

Jax returns from a business meeting to discover Carly and the others have been quarantined due to a toxin that has been released in the hospital. When a fire engulfs the hospital, Jax makes several rescue flights. Carly escapes via a stairwell, and the two reunite and renew their wedding vows.

Carly discovers that she is pregnant, and that the pregnancy is extremely high risk. Jax learns the truth about Claudia's misdeeds, and is stunned when Jerry is revealed to be alive.

Claudia reveals that Jax knew that she planned the shooting it and kept it secret from both Carly and Sonny. Claudia kidnaps Carly, who goes into labor and gives birth to a daughter, Josslyn. Claudia attempts to kidnap the baby, but is bludgeoned to death by Michael. Carly and Jax take the baby home, but Carly, outraged that Jax had known that Claudia and Jerry were behind Michael's shooting, throws him out of the house.

=== 2010s ===
Sonny is put on trial for Claudia's murder, and Jax helps the police build their case by hiring a ruthless prosecutor and ensuring the police have enough evidence for trial. However, Michael's guilt is eventually revealed, and, disgusted by the cover-up, the judge sentences Michael to five years in prison. Jax feels guilty for this, and though Michael is eventually released conditionally, the events take its toll on Carly and Jax's marriage. When Brenda returns to town, Jax confides in her that he is worried that Sonny will hurt Josslyn or Morgan one day. Jerry returns to town on a mission to kidnap Brenda on behalf of a criminal called The Balkan. Though Jax tries to stop him, Brenda is kidnapped and poisoned by the Balkan after marrying Sonny. She is eventually rescued and Jerry is presumed dead after being shot by the Balkan.

Jax is worried about Josslyn and brings her to the hospital, where he and Carly find out Josslyn has kidney cancer. While Jax tries to find alternative methods other than chemotherapy, Carly finds out that Elizabeth's son, Jake Spencer, was hit by a car and is brain-dead. Elizabeth and Lucky agree to donate one of Jake's kidney's to Josslyn, and she recovers. Carly and Jax file for a divorce, and get into a heated custody battle for Josslyn. Jax wants full custody, believing Sonny poses a threat to Josslyn if Carly has any association with him. He pays a court-appointed mediator to throw the case his way, but Sonny finds out and has the mediator set Jax up on assault charges, resulting in the judge giving Carly full custody. Jax leaves town soon after, but comes back to kidnap his daughter. He later gives Josslyn back, but when he tries to leave town, Sonny sabotages his plane, angry that Brenda left him after he framed Jax. Jax's plane crashes, and he is presumed dead. However, he manages to escape, and gets Skye to help him leave town. He overhears Carly say that she wants to cut Sonny out of her life, and leaves knowing Josslyn is safe with Carly.

Jax is seen around sporadically by Michael and Carly, and then shows up in Port Charles when Carly contacts him after Josslyn is hospitalized with a strange illness. Jax comes back in time to see Josslyn recover and find out Jerry has poisoned the water supply for ransom. Jerry inoculates Josslyn against the poison and tries to keep Jax away by having him detained at the airport. Jax still finds his way to Port Charles and helps pay the ransom Jerry demands in order to get the cure. Jax tries to detain Jerry, but is presumed dead in an explosion. Jax is cured, and leaves town. He comes back for the Nurses' Ball being held in honor of Robin, and tells Carly their divorce was never finalized. He reveals he's now engaged to Brenda, but Carly believes Brenda is still attached to Sonny. Carly serves Jax their divorce papers and tells him Brenda went to see Sonny, though Brenda claims she didn't. Brenda later admits to Jax that she was wondering if she still had a chance with Sonny, and Jax breaks off their engagement and leaves town.

Jax returns in late 2016 for Morgan's funeral and again in early 2017 to tell Josslyn that his mother died.
