= General Hospital: Twist of Fate =

- Written by: Richard Culliton; Karen Harris; Michele Val Jean
- Directed by: Shelley Curtis
- Starring: Anthony Geary; Genie Francis; Jonathan Jackson; Jacklyn Zeman; Stephen Nichols; Brad Maule; Ingo Rademacher; Mary Beth Evans; Tyler Christopher; Maurice Benard; Vanessa Marcil; John J. York; Denise Alexander
- Country of origin: United States
- Original language: English

Production
- Producers: Wendy Riche; Julie Hanan Carruthers; Susan Dansby; Carol Scott; Lisa Levenson
- Editor: Stephen Burch
- Running time: 60 minutes (including commercials)
- Production company: Prospect Studios

Original release
- Network: ABC
- Release: December 14, 1996

General Hospital: Twist of Fate is the only primetime episode of the long-running ABC network soap opera General Hospital. The primetime special aired on Saturday on December 14, 1996.

== Synopsis ==
The television special revolved around Laura Spencer's supposed death at the hands of Stefan Cassadine. The Saturday special picked up directly where Friday's episode left off.

After having been told by Stefan that her mother, Lesley Webber, was alive, Laura entered the tower where she was being kept. Moments later, as Stefan went to enter the building, the tower exploded. Believing that Laura was indeed dead, her friends and family buried her remains. At the grave, her husband, Luke Spencer, swore revenge on the Cassadine family. Having been talked down by former brother-in-law Tony Jones, Luke surrendered his hidden pistol to police commissioner Mac Scorpio. After returning home and once again arming himself, Luke headed to Wyndemere to finish off Stefan once and for all.

After receiving a strange message from Miranda, Jax's first wife, Brenda Barrett, sent husband Jasper Jacks after her. After finally tracking down Miranda in Hawaii, Miranda confessed her true feelings to Jax, who explained to her that he was in love with Brenda, and that wasn't going to change any time soon. Just weeks later, Brenda and Jax learned that their marriage was invalid.

After being confronted with his mother's death, Nikolas Cassadine turned to Katherine Bell for support. The two ended up kissing, then Katherine explained to him the proper way to grieve for a woman that he didn't even know. Just as she was getting through to him, Mac burst in and threw Nikolas out. Moments later, a worried Katherine rushed out after him.

Shortly before heading to Laura's funeral, Sonny Corinthos received a troubled call from General Hospital. Thinking that Brenda was hurt, Sonny rushed to the room that she was supposedly in. As he searched frantically for her, a thug injected him with a paralyzing drug. He dumped Sonny at the penthouse, making it appear as though he had been shooting up. Brenda found him just in time, and rushed him to the hospital.

At Wyndemere, Luke tracked down Stefan, and held him at gunpoint in the courtyard. Moments before ending his life, Luke's sister Bobbie Spencer and son Lucky Spencer convinced him to drop the gun. He angrily left, and shortly after doing so, Stefan took the gun and fired into the woods, not knowing that the love of his life, Katherine, was looking for him there. The bullet ripped into Katherine's chest, dropping her to the forest floor.

In the final moments of the special, Luke and Lucky make their way back to a van in the woods where Laura and Lesley are waiting. It revealed, in a strange 'twist of fate', that Luke and Laura and had made it appear that the two women were dead to get her away from Stefan. In the closing scene, the catatonic Lesley finally spoke the word 'Laura' as the family drove off into the night.

== Ratings ==
The special received a 6.2 household rating. Its lead-in at 8:30 p.m., Edith Ann's Christmas, got a 4.9 rating while the lead-out show, Relativity, got a 4.6 rating. The most watched show of the night was Walker, Texas Ranger with a 10.8 rating.

The competition at 9 p.m.:

- Opryland's Country Christmas [8.7 rating]
- America's Most Wanted [6 rating]
- The Pretender [7.5 rating]
