= Brenda Barrett =

Fictional character from General Hospital

- General Hospital character
- Portrayed by: Vanessa Marcil
- Duration: 1992–1998; 2002–2003; 2010–2011; 2013
- First appearance: September 18, 1992
- Last appearance: April 23, 2013
- Created by: Maralyn Thoma
- Introduced by: Wendy Riche (1992); Jill Farren Phelps (2002, 2010); Frank Valentini (2013)
- Book appearances: Robin's Diary; The Secret Life of Damian Spinelli
- Spin-off appearances: General Hospital: Twist of Fate (1996)
In-universe information
- Other names: Brenda Veronica Barrett; Brenda Jacks; Brenda Morgan; Brenda Corinthos
- Occupation: Couture spokeswoman; Goodwill ambassador for ASEC (Alliance to Save Exploited Children); Humanitarian for UNICEF; Model; Music Industry executive
- Parents: Harlan Barrett; Veronica Wilding
- Half-sisters: Julia Barrett
- Spouse: Jasper Jacks (1996); Jason Morgan (2002–2003); Sonny Corinthos (2011)
- Sons: Alec Barrett
- Grandparents: Oscar Barrett; Cora Peters

Brenda Barrett is a fictional character from the ABC Daytime soap opera, General Hospital. The role was originated by Vanessa Marcil on September 18, 1992. After a six-year run with the show, the character was believed to have died after her mentally ill mother drove their car off a cliff. After a four-year absence, Marcil reprised her role for a few short months. Marcil was nominated for a Daytime Emmy Award in the category of Outstanding Supporting Actress in a Drama Series for her role as Brenda in both 1997 and 1998, and she won in that category in 2003.

After years of rumors, Marcil returned to the soap on August 11, 2010. However, she exited on July 21 of the following year. In April 2013, in celebration of the series' 50th anniversary, Marcel returned to General Hospital for a four-week guest stint.

== Casting ==
Actress Vanessa Marcil premiered in the role of Brenda on General Hospital on September 18, 1992. She remained with the series for six years before departing on September 11, 1998. In May 2002, it was announced that Marcil would return to the series as Brenda Barrett. Her return, however, was cut short when in January 2003 it was announced that Marcil was leaving the series once again, this time over contract disputes.

In an interview with TV Guide, Marcil stated:

When I signed a short-term deal last summer, I made it clear I'd have to see how my son responded to my going back to work. And he hasn't responded well. I'm really disappointed to be leaving, but I guess ABC's not willing to compromise on the things I need. I have a lot more needs now that I have a child, and they need what they need to run a show smoothly.

Marcil's last airdate aired on February 19, 2003. In the next few years following her exit, rumors continued to appear concerning Marcil's return on the Internet, with nothing of truth coming to them. During her stint on the NBC series Las Vegas, Internet rumors began to heat up over a possible reprisal of Brenda Barrett. However, following another season pick up in 2007, Marcil's reps said that she could not reprise, due to being contractually obligated to the NBC series.

Fan rumors persisted, with speculation of a possible recast in talks on Internet message boards. Such actresses as Gina Tognoni (Dinah Marler, GL; Kelly Cramer, OLTL) and Rebecca Budig (Greenlee Smythe, AMC) were rumored to be up for a recast however no truth came to such rumors.

In early 2008, then-executive producer Robert Guza, Jr. confirmed to Soap Opera Digest that he was in close talks with Marcil to reprise her role of Brenda. Guza stated:

I'm in very close contact with [Vanessa]. She wants to make it happen. I would do handstands to make it happen

Fans were disappointed once again in 2008, when following the cancellation of Las Vegas, Marcil landed two primetime acting jobs; a role on the NBC series Lipstick Jungle and as a host on the reality series Blush: The Search for the Next Great Makeup Artist on Lifetime.

In January 2009, Marcil told her fans that she was trying to make a return to General Hospital work. In a statement to Soap Opera Digest, she stated:

We're trying to make it work again. We were trying to fit it in this past year, but it didn't work out, so maybe in '09 we'll find a way.

However, a mere two weeks later, such "talks" were muted when Marcil landed the recurring role as Kim Marcus on the CBS primetime series Without a Trace. She premiered in the role on March 17, 2009. In early January 2010, the series confirmed they were back in-talks with Marcil to reprise the role of Brenda Barrett. Guza commented:

We have actually been in contact with Vanessa, and there is interest on both parts in seeing Brenda return.

Three months later, rumors began heating up that Marcil was closer than ever towards a return to Port Charles and Brenda Barrett. On June 7, 2010, after seven years of speculation, ABC announced that Marcil had signed a one-year contract with the series to reprise the role of Brenda Barrett on General Hospital. When asked why she decided to return to the series, Marcil stated:

Because it feels so right. A lot's been going on. We found out that my older sister, Sherry, has breast cancer. We've bought a farm in upstate New York and she and I went up there to spend a week together before she had to start her chemo, and it got me thinking about how grateful I am to GH for giving me pretty much everything I have. [Head writer] Bob Guza and I got back in touch again during that time. I told him I wanted to settle down for a while so that I could be available to my sister and my family, and that maybe during that time I could come in and out at GH for a couple of days a week. I called [ABC Daytime chief] Brian Frons and asked him if he would have me back, and he was gracious enough to say yes. I just couldn't feel any more grateful that I'm still allowed to visit such a great place. I love that Julianne Moore went back to As the World Turns to honor where she came from. It's important to do that. I left GH for a few different reasons, but it was never because I wasn't madly in love with the show and the character and with daytime.

During an interview in February 2011, Marcil revealed she'd entertain signing another one-year contract if it worked with her scheduling and family life. On June 7, 2011, it was announced that Marcil would once again vacate the role of Brenda. Marcil departed General Hospital again on July 21, 2011.

It was announced on March 5, 2013, that Marcil would once again reprise her role as Brenda for the series' 50th anniversary celebration.

== Storylines ==
=== Background ===
Brenda Veronica Barrett is born to Harlan Barrett and his former lover, Veronica Wilding, on March 31, 1975, the birth celebrated on-screen April 5. In 1992, the 17-year-old drops out of boarding school and turns up on the doorstep of her older sister, Julia. Julia has been blocking Brenda's access to her trust fund until she agrees to finish school. She later moves in with Jagger Cates and clashes with Karen Wexler, who is in love with Jagger. Brenda also becomes best friends with Robin Scorpio.

=== 1990s ===
An 18-year-old Brenda begins an unforgettable romance with older mobster Sonny Corinthos in 1993, bringing General Hospital some of its highest ratings since previous Supercouple Luke & Laura. Brenda nurses Sonny back to health after he is shot in his attempt to break Frank Smith out of prison. Despite all who care for Brenda warning her about how dangerous Sonny is, she refuses to believe it. Brenda agrees to wear a wire hoping to prove all of her friends wrong. Sonny discovers what Brenda is doing and, furious, kicks Brenda out of his apartment, leaving her devastated. Brenda does not give up and does everything she can to get Sonny back. Sonny finally admits his feelings for Brenda and attempts to leave his new wife Lily for Brenda, but shortly after, Lily discovers she is pregnant. Knowing what having a child means to Sonny, Brenda realizes they can never have a future together. Sonny dedicates himself to being a good husband, whilst still longing for and loving Brenda. Immediately after her breakup with Sonny, Brenda is comforted by the dashing billionaire Jasper Jacks, who demands that she marry him immediately and give herself a real chance at happiness (without Sonny). Brenda marries Jax at the same moment that Sonny's wife, Lily, is killed in a car bomb. After mourning the death of Lily, Sonny dedicates himself to getting back his true love, Brenda. Sonny does everything he can to force Brenda to admit her true feelings for him, but Brenda denies it and wants to honor her husband Jax. Sonny proves Brenda's marriage to Jax to be invalid by bringing Jax's supposedly dead wife, Miranda, to Port Charles. Brenda decides to stay with Jax, which was the height of the very popular Sonny-Brenda-Jax love triangle. Later Brenda is kidnapped in an effort to frame Sonny. When Sonny comes to rescue her, they are trapped together in a cave, where the two admit their feelings for one another and make love. Brenda tells Jax the horrible truth. Brenda decides to end her relationships with both Jax and Sonny because she cannot choose between the man she loves (Sonny) and the man who made her happy (Jax).

The mid-1990s storyline of General Hospital's Sonny Corinthos, Brenda Barrett, and Jasper "Jax" Jacks is often referred to as "the hottest love triangle in soap opera history" by the soap opera media.

Brenda and Sonny later reunite as Hernando, Lily's father, is attempting to frame her for the murder of Dr. Pierce Dorman. Sonny later kills Hernando in self-defense and ultimately clears Brenda of all charges. Sonny finally proposes and Brenda happily accepts, assuming they can leave Port Charles and the mob behind. On their wedding day, Sonny realizes Brenda will never be safe with him and sends Jason Morgan to tell her he has left town. Brenda is distraught and later moves back in with the Quartermaines, for a short period of time and then moves in with Jax. He tries to help her deal with Sonny's betrayal and calls on her estranged sister Julia to help. Brenda's emotional and mental health only gets worse, which leads to her being institutionalized. After recovering, Brenda decides she wants to be with Jax because he is healthy for her. As she and Jax prepare to marry, Sonny returns but understands she has moved on. Brenda's estranged mother Veronica Wilding arrives in town in 1998 revealing she has a mental illness which could be hereditary. Brenda gets tested. Before she can see the results, Veronica drives a car off a cliff with Brenda in the passenger seat. Believing Brenda is dead, Jax tears up the test results without reading them to learn if Brenda had in fact inherited her mother's "crazy genes".

=== 2000s ===
Luis Alcazar, an arms dealer, rescues Brenda from the water after her accident and brings her back to Port Charles in September 2002. Alcazar reveals to Brenda that she really does have Veronica's illness. He wants to care for her as long as she is alive. Luis becomes very jealous of her past romances with Sonny and Jax and plans to kill them. Brenda discovers Alcazar's plans and escapes. She then has someone lure Sonny to St. Timothy's Church, where they were supposed to marry, without revealing her identity. Brenda opens the doors of the church to a shocked Sonny. She watches in horror as he is shot multiple times. Jason arrives and finds Brenda crying over Sonny who orders him to keep her safe. Brenda blames herself for Sonny's "death" and tries to escape from Jason to warn Jax. Brenda finally escapes and finds Jax as he is marrying Skye Quartermaine. Jax is shocked to see Brenda but she does warn him about Alcazar's plans. Alcazar finally locates Jax and shoots him. Jax survives. Sonny returns and attempts to kill Alcazar. Jax is paralyzed. Brenda decides to help him in his recovery, much to the chagrin of Skye. Brenda comforts her by revealing she is dying and won't interfere with their life. Despite her reassurance to Skye, Brenda and Jax get close again. Meanwhile, Skye learns Brenda is not dying. Brenda begins to worry about the damage her renewed love for Jax could do, and blackmails Jason into marrying her. Jason agrees but only to keep Brenda away from Sonny who is now married to his best friend, Carly. Alcazar later convinces an envious Skye to help him kidnap Brenda. He whisks Brenda away on a plane not knowing Sonny is hiding on board. The plane crashes in a jungle. Jason and Carly rescue Brenda and Sonny. Jax discovers the truth about Brenda's illness and dumps Skye for keeping the truth from him. He then tells Brenda she is not dying and professes his love.

When Alcazar is killed, Skye is hurt and angrily blames Brenda for the murder. Jax confesses to protect Brenda. The truth is revealed. Brenda is arrested along with Jason as the accomplice. Jason and Brenda decide against an annulment so that they can't testify against one another during the murder trial. When evidence is discovered that could send them to prison, Brenda's attempt to persuade Jason into skipping town with her fails. Fortunately, evidence is found clearing Jason and Brenda of all charges. Brenda and Jason then leave to get the marriage annulled. She convinces him to get the annulment in Port Charles, which would take longer, because she is not ready to marry Jax.

Brenda runs into Sonny the night before her wedding to Jax and forgives him for leaving her at the altar. They then share a passionate kiss which Carly witnesses. Jax finds out about the kiss and does not say the expected "I do" at the wedding. Jax tells Brenda he does not trust her. Brenda runs into Sonny. He reveals Carly had left him too. Jason returns home. He finds Brenda crying She announces she is leaving Port Charles. Jason drops her off at the airport. Brenda tells him he deserves to be happy more than anyone.

=== 2010s ===
On August 11, 2010, Brenda appears on-screen in Italy now a world-famous supermodel and the face of the Alliance to Save Exploited Children. She is at a press conference. Just before she steps on stage, a man tries to kill her. Brenda's bodyguards stop him before he reaches her. Brenda finally faces the crowd, with tears in her eyes. Brenda is shocked to see Sonny in Italy. He reveals he is running from the police. After reminiscing about their tumultuous relationship, she persuades him to return home. When Brenda's security seems to be failing, her friend Suzanne contacts her ex-husband, Jason. Jason comes to Rome and steps in as her bodyguard though they constantly bicker and emphasize their dislike for one another. When Jason finally decides to go back to Port Charles, the Balkan's thugs get hold of Brenda and inject her with heroin. Jason returns just in time to save Brenda. He ultimately decides it would be safer for her in Port Charles. Jason and Brenda arrive in town on September 30, 2010, where she meets Spinelli, who is like a brother to Jason. Spinelli gives her the nickname "The Divine One." On October 8, 2010, Brenda visits Jax's and they talk about how things are doing for them. When Brenda goes to Sonny's house, she runs into Dante, who asks her what she is doing there. Sonny then comes in and introduces Brenda and Dante, but clearly they seem to know one another already.

Through flashbacks and her discussions with Dante and Jason, the audience learns Brenda was once involved with the Balkan's son, Aleksander. Once she learned he was involved with exploiting children, she broke up with him and traveled to Manhattan. Dante, along with three other officers, was hired to guard Brenda. Once, while she and Dante were out on a walk, Aleksander tries to attack Brenda. While Dante and Aleksander fight, Brenda picks up the gun Dante dropped and shoots him. Once she realizes she killed him, she panics. Dante tells her no one will find out. He then dumps the body. It is also revealed the secret involves a baby, but details are not made clear.

On December 22, 2010, during Luke Spencer and Tracy Quartermaine's wedding reception, Sonny proposes to Brenda in Lila Quartermaine's rose garden. After some convincing, she accepts. Meanwhile, Spinelli reveals to Carly that Brenda and Dante had a child together. Tracy throws the bouquet. Brenda catches it. She and Sonny then announce their engagement to the wedding guests. She returns to Jason's penthouse. Theo Hoffman stops by, informing her he is her new defence attorney, when he is really the Balkan. He questions her but she leaves to go on a walk. She runs into Dante and tells him she is considering telling Sonny about the baby, He says if the truth won't do any good, then she should not tell him.

In January 2011, Brenda sets her and Sonny's wedding date for February 18, 2011. Jason agrees to walk her down the aisle to Sonny at their wedding. On February 1, Dante asks Brenda about what happened to the baby, because she never told him. Brenda tells him she was not able to talk about it before, but after having a conversation with Sam McCall about the loss of her daughter, her feelings about her own baby came back. She was able to talk about what happened. Brenda breaks down and tells Dante she lost the baby, a boy, while on a relief trip to Africa for ASEC. It is presumed Dante was the father since he signed away his parental rights away. On February 4, Brenda and her best friend and maid of honor, Robin, arrive back at the Penthouse to see her newly delivered wedding dress, but when they get to her room, they find her wedding dress ripped to shreds. Believing Carly was responsible for destroying her dress. Brenda and Robin confront her. Later, she tells Sonny that Carly was responsible. It was revealed Suzanne was responsible for destroying the wedding dress and is married to Theo Hoffman (the Balkan) and was Aleksander's mother.

At the wedding, Brenda objects because if she does not, Carly will. After starting to explain, Carly stands and pulls out the proof she has. Dante intervenes saying he claimed Brenda's child and signed over custody, but it was in friendship as Brenda was pregnant by someone else. After apologizing to Sonny, and claiming her love for him, she walks down the aisle to leave. Sonny calmly stops her, and tells her he made that mistake once and would not make it again, and that her father lied to her (when he said she was not worth loving), and that Sonny loves her and still wants to marry her. After getting through everything and hugging in front of all their wedding guests, the couple say their vows, exchange rings and are pronounced husband and wife in front of a mostly happy crowd. As Brenda gets into a limo to wait for Sonny, the limo explodes.

When the authorities finally get through the wreckage, everybody is shocked to discover Sam, amazingly still alive, inside the limo with no sign of Brenda; the Balkan, with the presumed help of Jason's old enemy Franco, had swapped Brenda out for Sam and blown up the limo as a distraction, while Brenda is in the clutches of the Balkan. After being interrogated by Theo, Brenda manages to escape into the woods with the help of Jules, a sympathetic servant to Theo, only to be recaptured shortly after.

Eventually, Brenda manages to convince Jules to get a message to Sonny and lead him to Theo's hideout, but is found out by Theo. When Brenda repeatedly fails to give Theo the answers he wants, he loses his patience and injects her with a deadly neurotoxin. Brenda tells Theo she doesn't really know what happened to the baby because she was not awake when the baby was born. When Sonny, Jason, and Dante finally arrive, they discover Brenda semi-conscious on the couch.

With Brenda's life hanging in the balance, Sonny wisely chooses to get her to the hospital over pursuing Theo and airlifts her to the hospital. Brenda is given an antidote and regains consciousness with Sonny at her side. At this point Brenda is unaware that her son is alive and was previously kidnapped and put up for adoption by Suzanne.

Sonny and Brenda depart for Positano, Italy for their honeymoon, but upon discovering Jake Spencer, Jason's son with Elizabeth Webber, has been hit by a car and killed, they immediately return to be there for the devastated Jason. Brenda later meets up with Carly in the hopes of coming to a truce, but Carly is uncooperative and refuses.

Suzanne gives Lucian, her believed-to-be dead son, back to Brenda on April 5, 2011. Though shocked, she quickly falls in love with Lucian and bonds with him; however, Brenda and Sonny begin to have some difficulties. Brenda has doubts about raising Lucian in a mob environment. Sonny doubts the child is actually Brenda's. In May 2011, it was revealed Suzanne took Brenda's biological son away and in his place gave Lucian to Brenda, as a decoy in the place of Alec (her real son). Suzanne kept Alec hidden from her, so she would be able to spend the rest of her life with her grandson, and they would never be apart again, while Brenda spent her time happily with Lucian, believing he was her true son. Suzanne's plan fell apart, however, after Brenda, with the advice of Sonny and best friend Robin, decided to take a DNA test on Lucian to see if he is really her biological son. When Suzanne heard of the plans for the DNA test, she kidnapped Lucian taking him down to San Antonio, so Brenda would never find out Lucian is not her true biological son. Brenda was distraught at Lucian's disappearance. She went on television with her ex-lover and friend Jasper Jacks identifying Suzanne as Lucian's kidnapper and offering a reward for any information on her whereabouts. Sonny, Dante Falconeri, and Carly Corinthos become involved in the search for Lucian. Lucian was returned to his real family in Phoenix, by Suzanne. Sonny, Carly, and Dante find Suzanne and Alec instead. After a confrontation with Suzanne, Sonny brings Alec back to Port Charles. Alec is introduced to Brenda, who is thrilled to have her real son but feels deeply betrayed by Sonny for choosing to take Carly on the search for her son, instead of her. Brenda has a hard time bonding with Alec, unlike Lucian.

Jax tries get full custody of Josslyn which causes problems in Sonny and Brenda's marriage. In June 2011, Jax tells Brenda that he is going to subpoena her to testify to the Judge about how bad Sonny's life is. Brenda refuses to do so. In early July Brenda and Alec are shot at while getting in a car. Brenda is visibly shaken, but Sonny dismisses the incident and claims the shooters were not aiming for her or Alec, but simply wanted to warn Sonny that his family is in danger. Sonny tells Brenda not to mention the incident to the judge. On July 15, 2011, Brenda tells the judge about the incident whilst also saying that Sonny is a good father. Brenda later learns that Jax has been arrested for attacking the court mediator, Grace Yand and having drugs in his suite.

After finding out that Sonny set Jax up Brenda tells Sonny, to the great distress of both, that she is leaving him. Brenda realizes that she must prioritize her son Alec's welfare over her own happiness with Sonny. Sonny begs her to stay and asks what he can do to fix what he has done. On July 21, 2011, Brenda gives Sonny her rings back and says goodbye to Robin. Brenda also asks Robin to give Sonny a letter that she wrote when she feels it's the right time. Jasper Jacks flies Brenda to Rome with her son Alec. She later serves Sonny their official divorce papers through his attorney Diane Miller.

Brenda returns to Port Charles in early April 2013 to attend the Nurse's Ball in Robin's honor, who is assumed dead. Brenda shows up at Sonny's house to talk to him, Sonny think it's to get back together and Brenda corrects him saying they would have gotten back together had he read the letter she had written him prior to leaving two years ago, but now they can't get back together. Brenda has moved on and tells Sonny about her engagement to Jax. Meanwhile, Jax was with Carly asking her to sign the divorce papers. While there, after telling Carly about the engagement, Carly bets Jax one million dollars that Brenda is with Sonny asking for him back. After Jax leaves, Carly sneaks into Sonny's house and hears Brenda doing exactly what she told Jax she would be doing. Carly goes to Jax and Brenda's hotel room and tells Jax what she heard at Sonny's house. Jax calls off the wedding. Brenda shows up at the Nurses Ball alone, and gets in an argument with Carly. It ends, but then soon after Brenda throws something at Carly's head and is taken out by security for "causing a disruption."

Brenda then fakes having a one-night stand with a drunken Michael to get back at Carly. Before leaving Port Charles, Brenda reveals the truth to Sonny, and invites him to live with her and Alec in Rome. Sonny declines, stating that for them to try again, they each need time to heal. Brenda leaves Port Charles hopeful that one day the two of them can have a happy future together.

=== Night Shift mystery ===
On the General Hospital spin-off Night Shift, one storyline surrounds a woman visiting from Europe – Brenda lives in Italy. The dark-haired woman has an accident at her hotel and then suffers from severe burns when the ambulance she's in explodes. When the patient's heart stops, she is sent to the hospital morgue but she regains consciousness. The woman's face remains bandaged and she is on bed rest until the season finale. In the final episode, the woman flirts with Damian Spinelli without showing her face. Later, she watches as Jason and Robin share an embrace. The unknown woman leaves, revealing a tattoo similar to the one Brenda has on her lower back. Although the name "Barrett" was shown, the woman is never explicitly stated to be Brenda.

== Reception ==
In 2023, Charlie Mason from Soaps She Knows placed Brenda at #14 on his ranked list of General Hospital’s 40+ Greatest Characters of All Time, commenting that "This passion’s plaything always meant to be smart about love, to not only think but think twice. In the end, however, the one that got away from both Sonny and Jax just over and over again wound up putting heart over mind."
