= Laura Spencer (General Hospital) =

Fictional character from General Hospital

- General Hospital character
- Genie Francis as Laura Spencer
- Portrayed by: Stacey Baldwin (1974–1976); Genie Francis (1977–present)
- Duration: 1974–1984; 1993–2002; 2006; 2008; 2013; 2015–present
- First appearance: 1974
- Created by: Bridget and Jerome Dobson
- Introduced by: James Young (1974); Tom Donovan (1977); Gloria Monty (1983–84); Wendy Riche (1993); Jill Farren Phelps (2006, 2008); Frank Valentini (2013, 2015)
- Book appearances: Robin's Diary
- Spin-off appearances: General Hospital: Twist of Fate (1996)
- Crossover appearances: Roseanne
In-universe information
- Other names: Laura Vining; Laura Faulkner; Laura Webber; Laura Baldwin; Laura Collins; Lucy Johnson; Nora Charles; Lasha Cassadine; Lulu Thornhill
- Occupation: Mayor of Port Charles (2019–present), receptionist, model, businesswoman
- Family: Webber (adoptive)
- Father: Gordon Grey
- Mother: Lesley Webber
- Adoptive parents: Jason Vining (illegal); Barbara Vining (illegal)
- Adoptive father: Rick Webber
- Sisters: Amy Vining (illegal)
- Half-brothers: Cyrus Renault; Martin Grey; Jeremy Williams; Mike Webber (adoptive); Blackie Parrish (foster); Rick Webber, Jr. (adoptive)
- Spouse: Scotty Baldwin (1979–1981, 2013–2014); Luke Spencer (1981–2001, 2006-2008); Stavros Cassadine (1982); Kevin Collins (2017–present)
- Sons: Nikolas Cassadine; Lucky Spencer
- Daughters: Lulu Spencer
- Grandsons: Spencer Cassadine; Cameron Webber; Jake Webber (legal); Aiden Spencer; Rocco Falconeri; Ace Cassadine
- Granddaughters: Charlotte Cassadine
- Grandfathers: Walter Sullivan; Lars Webber (adoptive)
- Grandmothers: Mary Sullivan; Helene Webber (adoptive)
- Uncles: Jeff Webber (adoptive)
- Aunts: Terri Arnett (adoptive)
- First cousins: Steve Webber (adoptive); Sarah Webber (adoptive); Elizabeth Webber (adoptive); Hayden Barnes (adoptive)

Laura Spencer (also Collins) is a fictional character from General Hospital, an American soap opera on the ABC network. Laura, originally played by Stacey Baldwin, was introduced in 1974 as the illegitimate daughter of Lesley Webber (Denise Alexander). The character was written out in the summer of 1976. In early 1977, Genie Francis took over the role of the rebellious teenage Laura. In 1978, thanks to the efforts of executive producer Gloria Monty's plan to entice younger viewers, the character's popularity skyrocketed in the late 1970s and early 1980s due to her pairings with Scott Baldwin (Kin Shriner) and, most famously, Luke Spencer (Anthony Geary); the latter became a popular supercouple among soap opera fans and viewers. Luke and Laura's 1981 wedding – which featured a guest appearance from Elizabeth Taylor – was viewed by 30 million people. In 1981, Francis quit the show, claiming unequal treatment compared to Geary, and the character was written out as having disappeared the following January. Francis returned for a brief stint in late 1983 to reunite Luke and Laura, and then again in late 1984 when Laura was revealed to be pregnant.

In 1993, Laura was re-introduced by producer Wendy Riche, along with Luke and their young son Lucky Spencer (Jonathan Jackson). Their stories consisted of their struggle to hide from mobster Frank Smith, the 1994 birth of their daughter Lulu Spencer and the introduction of Laura's illegitimate son Nikolas Cassadine (Tyler Christopher), who comes to town to save an ailing Lulu. Francis quit the series in June 2001 indefinitely when Luke and Laura divorced, however she returned in February 2002 on six month contract which concluded with Laura was written out after suffering a psychotic breakdown, after believing to have killed her adoptive father Rick Webber (Chris Robinson). Francis returned in 2006 to celebrate Luke and Laura's 25th wedding anniversary. The return stint, which only lasted a month, featured Laura's reunions with her children, Nikolas, Lucky (Greg Vaughan), and Lulu (Julie Marie Berman), and Laura's renewal of her wedding vows with Luke on their anniversary date. The return garnered Francis the Daytime Emmy Award for Outstanding Supporting Actress in a Drama Series. Francis returned to the series again in 2008 to help Lulu, who had also been institutionalized. In 2013, in honor of the show's 50th anniversary celebration, Francis reprised the role of Laura when the writers revisited the iconic Ice Princess plot, and Laura was briefly remarried to Scott. Although initial reports said the actress would stick around, Francis left the role again that August. Francis returned to the series in 2015, this time as part of Luke's exit storyline. Francis later signed a deal for her to remain with the series indefinitely.

== Creation ==
=== Casting ===
Child actress Stacey Baldwin originated the role of Laura Vining in 1974. Baldwin last appeared as Laura in August 1976. Genie Francis filmed her first scenes on December 28, 1976, and made her onscreen debut on February 8, 1977. The daughter of veteran actor, Ivor Francis, Genie Francis was new to acting and had recently appeared on the ABC drama series, Family opposite Kristy McNichol. Four months later, the then 14-year-old Francis booked the role of Laura. Francis signed a three-year contract with the series and a later admitted that she felt a bit trapped. "I signed away three years of my life. Never again" she said. "There was no light at the end of the tunnel." "It was a very small part" Francis said of the character when she initially booked the role of Laura. "I was just Lesley's long-lost daughter living in a commune" Francis said. Francis auditioned for the role of Laura twice and beat out 40 other actresses for the part. "It's hard to shut her off" Francis said of the character in 1979. "I will get home and I find that my body is sore from tension, or I'm still about to cry."

In 1983, Francis reflected on her early years with the series in an interview with Soap Opera Digest. Francis said, "The first year was a tremendous learning process, but then I got hold of it and took it on my own." The actress said "I was very nervous at the beginning, but when I learned to relax, I got better." She further explained her inexperience. "I was a kid and had never been on a soundstage before. No one told me what to do. They handed me a script and said, "Go!" I was panicked—really hungry" for instruction. She continued, "So what I did was observe actors and do everything they did. Then I started asking questions." In her early years, Francis remembered being terrified of going to the studio alone and was accompanied by a nanny hired by her parents. Francis developed a "close" father-daughter like relationship with her onscreen father, Michael Gregory who took her under his wing. Meanwhile, Francis was initially intimidated by veteran actress Denise Alexander who played her onscreen mother but the two would become close friends. "She really took me under her wing and when she saw me doing something wrong, she would tell me" Francis said. By the end of her first stint at General Hospital in 1982, Francis was reportedly making $150,000 a year.

Francis returned as Laura on October 29, 1993.

On May 29, 2015, Entertainment Weekly reported that Francis would once again make a return to the series, beginning June 5. Francis revealed she would continue to appear on the series following Anthony Geary's exit, which she was originally intended to be returning for. Francis promised she would continue to be seen through the fall sweeps period.

In October 2015, it was reported that Francis has inked a deal with the series and will remain in the role of Laura. In January 2018, Daytime Confidential reported that Francis has been demoted to recurring status. On July 31, 2018, TV Insider announced that Francis would be returning as a series regular.

=== Characterization ===
In 1979, the character was described by Soap Opera Digest's Joanne Douglas as "scheming, self-centered" and "frequently tormented." As a teen, Laura is very restless which often gets her into trouble. According to Douglas, Laura's actions are her attempts to obtain her freedom from her parents. According to Francis, teen girls identified with the "typically rebellious" Laura. Mary Murphy of TV Guide described the character as a confused teenager, struggling "to love and be loved." Murphy also described Laura as "conniving, and often bittersweet." Francis described Laura as "passive" and said "[She] was sweet for a long time." Francis stated that she appreciated how the writers transitioned Laura from being a girl to a young woman; as she gets older, Laura becomes a fighter and displays a lot of strength. Though Laura's actions are not always noble, Francis explained that Laura's intentions are always pure, and she does not intend to hurt anyone. However, Francis acknowledged the character's growth and wisdom. Upon her character's return in 1983, Francis said Laura is "more sophisticated" and "more mature." After her 1993 return, Francis voiced her concerns that the character had become "a little too good... a little too on high moral ground" Francis explained. The actress continued "What I loved about Laura the first time around was the she was so human. She always wanted to do the right thing, but sometimes she couldn't. Lately, she's been too much in control." She further stated, "What I don't like to play is this perfect person who is beyond human error."

== Development ==
=== Early storylines ===
The character did not undergo any real character development until almost two years into Francis's tenure as Laura. At the time, the series was facing cancellation and ABC brought on Gloria Monty as executive producer to save it. The new show runner's first order of business was to attract younger viewers by putting the teenage Francis' Laura front and center. Francis reminisced about Monty's conversation with her parents and her eagerness for more work in 1976. "She told my parents, ‘My idea is to use your daughter to capture this young audience.’ I was absolutely champing at the bit to prove myself as an actress, so I welcomed the opportunity with a lot of gusto." Suddenly, Francis found herself with a very demanding work schedule in which she arrived on set at 7:30 am and sometimes did not finish work until midnight. The young actress also had study 30 to 50 pages of dialogue daily. Instead of 2 shows a week, Francis was onscreen every day. After Monty restructured the series around the character, Laura dreams of living independent from her parents and starts thinking about marriage. "Gloria put sex and romance into Laura's life and it bowled me over" Francis said. "Here I was doing things in front of 20 million people that I had never done in my own life." Some of the character's earliest storylines include running away to a commune at age 15, Laura's affair with David Hamilton (Jerry Ayres), who was in love with her mother Lesley. Only eight months after Monty's hiring, she had Laura kill Hamilton. Though teenagers couldn't relate to the murder itself, they could relate to the feelings of betrayal and Laura's strained relationship with her mother. Francis credited the storyline with allowing her to prove herself as an actress. "It was a romance with an older man." In a 1996 interview with Soap Opera Update, Francis said that the David Hamilton storyline "really did drive the character and make her who she was." According to Francis, during the ordeal Laura is "freaked out about looking good to the rest of the world because she was in the scandal sheets as a slut."

In the summer of 1977, Kin Shriner was cast in the role of Scott "Scotty" Baldwin to play opposite Francis's Laura. Scotty and Laura would eventually be paired together in a romantic story. Francis said "We did a first-love story with real-life sex, romance and heartbreak. ... It's every teen-ager's story." According to Shriner, "Laura was the big love of Scotty's life." Their end leaves Scotty "jaded" and screwed up. Scotty was Laura's first kiss, and Shriner was Francis's first kiss. Francis said, "I'd been pecked before, but this was a real kiss!" With a new love in her life, Laura inquires about birth control. "It was the first time I was nervous" Francis admitted. Laura and Scotty have a year long courtship which includes "parental disapproval," Scotty supporting Laura during the David Hamilton murder trial, and the interference of Bobbie Spencer (Jacklyn Zeman) who wants Scott for herself. Finally, in July 1979, over the course of six episodes, Scotty and Laura are married. Francis and Shriner became quite close during their onscreen romance. Though Laura did love Scotty, their marriage also helps to "improve her social standing" and allows her to rise above her tragic past as a murderer. At some point, art imitated life and Francis and Shriner dated for nearly a year.

=== Beginnings of Luke and Laura ===
"It’s something we all want to believe in. Luke and Laura were underdogs – she was bounced from home to home, he was poor and from the wrong side of the tracks. Their story said, if you love each other enough, you can overcome all the odds and you will be the prince and princess. Americans love the underdogs, and everyone just got on board with that. ... What happened in the country was really beyond good storytelling or good acting or good show making. It really moved into sort of a cult kind of reaction, and that I can’t explain to you. That would be a question for a sociologist."

— Genie Francis on Luke and Laura's appeal.

In 1978, Bobbie enlists her streetwise brother Luke Spencer (Anthony Geary) to help her break up Scotty and Laura. Luke was expected to be a short term role as he "was supposed to wreak havoc" on the young couple on his sister's behalf. The character was supposed to be killed off rather early, but Geary's popularity gave the character a "reprieve" and Luke began falling for Laura. To satisfy viewers' hopes for an eventual Luke and Laura romance, the writers planned to have Luke die in Laura's arms at the end of the arc and then reunite her with Scotty. In 1979 when Pat Falken Smith – known for her work on Days of Our Lives – took over as head writer of General Hospital, Laura had just married Scotty and everyone was happy. "And the thing to do was immediately get Laura unhappy" Smith declared. Smith penned the controversial rape storyline in which a drunken Luke rapes Laura on the floor of the campus disco in October 1979. Francis characterized the incident as "an acquaintance rape" because it was "by someone Laura knew and had been fascinated with."

In a 1983 interview with Soap Opera Digest, after Luke and Laura had been written to fall in love, Francis described the incident as a "seduction rape." She continued echoing Pat Smith's own words that "It came to a point where it was beyond her control, and she couldn't get away from it." Francis further explained that Laura stayed even though she "felt the element of danger." The actress stated that "Laura only called it rape because she wasn't sure what really happened." Though Francis herself admittedly hated the idea, Laura was very much in love with Luke. To maintain excitement within the plot Gloria Monty borrowed ideas from old movies sending Luke and Laura on a cross-country summer adventure when they are on the run from the mob in 1980. Plans for the Luke/Laura/Scotty triangle to continue had to be scrapped when Kin Shriner left the show in 1980. In story, a dejected Scotty left town. The summer of 1981 featured the iconic Ice Princess diamond storyline in which Luke and Laura save the world from being frozen by the evil Mikkos Cassadine (John Colicos). Then head writer Thom Racina planned to hold off Luke and Laura's wedding for another six months by having Scotty return. However, the producers were soon contacted by actress Elizabeth Taylor who was a fan of the show and had read about the storyline decision. Taylor agreed to make a guest appearance on the condition that Luke and Laura be married. As Luke and Laura marry on November 16, 1981, Taylor made a five episode guest appearance as Mikkos's widow, Helena Cassadine cursing the couple for her husband's demise.

=== Departure and brief returns (1982–1984) ===
In a 1992 interview with Soap Opera Digest, Genie Francis revealed that she initially considered leaving the role of Laura behind in 1979, as 17-year-old Francis longed for the chance finish to out her last year of high school and graduate with her friends. However, her agent convinced her to stick around and finally make some money off of playing such a popular character because she did not make much from her first contract. Francis agreed and re-signed with the series for another two years. In October 1980, Francis revealed during an interview with People that the thrill she got as a young actress early on in her career was no longer there. She also announced her intention to start college in 1981. In September 1981, Francis called a press conference to officially announce her departure from the series by the end of the year. With news of Francis' impending departure from General Hospital, it was reported that she had received other job offers from both ABC and CBS. While ABC offered Francis a role on Dynasty, CBS offered Francis a more lucrative contract for starring roles in films and the lead in a potential prime time drama. Francis concluded her nearly five-year run on January 15, 1982. The writers set up a "mysterious disappearance" for Laura with the network claiming it was due to Francis leaving for college. However, Francis claimed that she did not plan on attending school full-time. "They never really gave me an exit" Francis said of her departure. "It was unfair to me and unfair to the fans." Within the story, Laura was simply a missing person. Francis filmed her final scenes "as if it were any other day." Francis speculated that the network underestimated how serious she was about leaving the show because she felt limited. "I would have stayed on if they had been a little more considerate of my time and allowed me to take other parts. It wasn't a question of money – they were quite generous – I was just tired of the same old role." In a 1993 interview featured in People magazine, Francis said "I was on the verge of having a total emotional breakdown" from the pressure of it all. But in a 2006 interview with the Archive of American Television, Francis said her 1982 departure occurred because she was in the throes of a drug problem that lasted a year. After being hospitalized, during which Anthony Geary and Gloria Monty visited her, she quickly returned to the set. While in her dressing room, Francis was informed by a crewmember that Monty had said "It didn't matter if she lived or died because Tony Geary is the whole show." "I left the show in that heartbeat," Francis said. "I thought that if it doesn't matter that I live or die, then I'm gone."

Francis herself suggested a storyline for her potential return that featured Laura's onscreen death; however that never panned out. In October 1983, it was announced that Francis had agreed to a brief return stint to reunite the characters of Luke and Laura. Francis revealed that she was contacted by executive producer Gloria Monty to return for about 2 months. However, they eventually settled on about "six weeks of air time." Of her character's return in 1983, Francis said "She's been through a lot. She's coming out of quite an ordeal." Francis praised Gloria Monty's vision for Laura's return and said the show runner had "really surpassed herself with this story, so it will be easy for me to have a wonderful time doing it." During a televised interview, Francis revealed that Laura's disappearance had to do with Helena Cassadine. Francis had several motivations for returning to the series. She explained "I did this for fans. And I did it for myself. But I'm also doing it for Gloria Monty." However, Francis was not in the business of recapturing her former glory. "We don't need to... We've already done it" the actress stated. "I'm looking to satisfy my character" Francis continued. "Laura is different and the storyline is very different" Francis explained. Francis returned to the series on November 14, 1983, and left on December 27, 1983. During an appearance on Good Morning America with Geary, Francis confirmed that her return would only be brief. Francis wrapped her storyline only a month later with her exit facilitating Geary's. The storyline also featured Francis's then boyfriend John Martinuzzi in the role of the evil Stavros Cassadine (initially a Cassadine cousin) who had forced Laura into marriage. Luke kills Stavros to rescue Laura. In an effort to boost ratings once again, ABC lured Francis and Geary back in 1984. The network spared no expense in flying several cast members, including Francis and Geary, to Cuernavaca, Mexico to film on location for six weeks. While Luke is on the run, it is revealed that Laura is pregnant. The story aired from October to December 1984, Francis aired from November 9 to December 10, 1984.

=== Return and Laura's pregnancy (1993–1994) ===
Despite her claims that she was open to a return in 1992, when she was officially approached about a GH return in May 1992, Francis declined the offer. When they approached her again eight months later, Francis said "I didn't know whether to do it." After a long hesitation, her agent pushed her to make a decision. However, instead of contacting ABC to give them an answer, Francis would end up calling Geary himself because she was unsure if they could do it again. The duo met for lunch and then met again to brainstorm and did some "improvisation" to discover who Luke and Laura had become and what they would be about. "I realized, miraculously, that the connection was still there" Francis said. Geary who had actually returned to the series in 1991 in the role of Luke's cousin Bill Eckert said "Basically, I didn't want to do Luke without Laura." In May 1993, during the 20th Daytime Emmy Awards, the official announcement was made; Francis would return and Geary would reprise the role of Luke. "I felt it was time to go back" Francis said. Francis further stated "I really wanted to come back and finish it the right way." Executive producer Wendy Riche spoke with People magazine about the duo's return. In addition to the introduction of Luke and Laura's 10-year-old child, Riche said "We want to focus on people who've got this great history. We want to see if they've grown or not." Riche later explained to TV Guide that "None of us had any desire to duplicate the past—and we don't need to... The chemistry between Tony and Genie is still magical, and the audience will still respond to the unconditional love between the characters because that kind of emotional bond is a rarity—in soaps and in life." Francis said of her eagerness to work opposite Geary again "I have never, ever, had an acting partnership that was as safe, as full, and as exciting as the one I had with Tony. I didn't want to go through life without having a chance to taste it again." Meanwhile, Geary echoed similar thoughts and said "I had so closed the door on Luke that there was a point when I couldn't even remember who he was. But when I sat down with Genie again, and looked at her and touched her and smelled her, it all came back. I can't do it without her."

In August 1993, committed to making sure the couple's return went off without a hitch, ABC fired the entire writing team and installed Emmy winning writer/producer who co-created Ryan's Hope Claire Labine as head writer. Geary said "I let out a deep breath and relaxed. I knew we'd be OK." Geary also developed the couples' return story with his writing partner Irene Suver. However, there was still "trepidation" not just from the actors, but also from the writers. Labine commented "If we weren't terrified, we'd be insane." Labine described the pairing as "two old and dear friends whom we deeply loved but lost." However, the scribe said of their return "Now they're coming home again—and in that context it's much less terrifying for us all." In addition to killing off the failed character of Bill, several popular characters including, Bill's sister Jenny (Cheryl Richardson), her husband Paul Hornsby (Paul Satterfield), Kin Shriner's Scotty, and Julia Barrett (Crystal Carson) were allegedly written out of the series to make way for the supercouple. The return also saw the introduction of Luke and Laura's 10-year-old son Lucky (Jonathan Jackson). ABC spared no expense in setting up the couple's usual grand entrance as the family appeared on October 29 in the midst of "explosions, car chases, helicopters, parachutes, mobsters, catacombds, and a very deadly waterfall" with several upstate New York location shoots.

In February 1994, Francis announced that she was pregnant with her first child. The pregnancy was written into the series and Laura is revealed to be pregnant with her second child. Soap Opera Digest said "It's not often that an actress's pregnancy works as beautifully into her storyline" as Francis's did. Much like when Laura's early stories guided Francis through adolescence, Francis would learn about motherhood through her portrayal of Laura. She formed a close bond with her onscreen son Jonathan Jackson. "It showed me that there is a part of me very ready to be a mother" Francis said. In story, the pregnancy encourages Laura to appeal to Luke's mob friend Sonny Corinthos (Maurice Benard) about keeping Luke and their family safe from Frank Smith (Mitchell Ryan) whom is about to break out of prison—with Sonny and Luke's help of course. If the couple's desire to get out from under Smith's constant threats weren't evident before, they are obvious and crucial when Laura learns she is pregnant. As Laura gives birth to daughter Lesley Lu on August 8, 1994, Francis took a six-week maternity leave to give birth to her own son on August 20. In story, Laura and Lesley Lu leave town to keep them safe from Luke's mob connections.

=== Murder of Damian Smith (1996) ===
After about two years in "storyline abyss" Francis was thrust back into the limelight when Laura becomes the prime suspect in a "Whodunit" murder mystery in 1996. The outcome of the story was a very huge guarded secret. Soap Opera Update reported that "ABC has so much invested in this whodunit that the show is reportedly secretly taping 20 scenes to be inserted in shows at the last minute so that neither the actors nor the crew can leak pivotal plot information to the press." When the evil mob prince Damian Smith (Leigh McCloskey) is murdered in March 1996, suspicion immediately falls on the unusually innocent Luke. However, everyone is stunned in April 1996 when Laura is suddenly arrested instead. Luke is willing to do just about anything to keep Laura out of trouble, including a prison break and going on the run. While they had done it before, living on the run would be much more complicated with two children. Though Laura at the time is trapped inside a burning building with foster children—a fire set by Damian himself—the timing and location of his murder makes her look awfully guilty. Head writer Bob Guza said "it doesn't matter whether or not she did it, but whether they can prove she did. It very much appears they can." Despite having the best attorney money can buy thanks to the wealthy Edward Quartermaine (John Ingle), Laura is indicted and sent to prison. Luke hires a new attorney in Edward's grandson Justus Ward (Joseph C. Phillips) and private investigator Mac Scorpio (John J. York) to help identify the real culprit. The "umbrella" story "encompasses many stories on the soap" and threatens Luke and Laura's relationship along with others. Laura's past with David Hamilton factors in when she realizes she could have killed Damian and repressed the memory like she did with David. Francis hoped that was the case. "She's lost it before. And that's okay with me." Laura is still in prison just in time for Mother's Day leaving the entire Spencer family in shambles. "We play very big emotional stuff with the kids" Guza stated. "Does Laura want them to see her in jail? Does she want Lesley Lu to remember her like this?" Meanwhile, Lucky feels extreme guilt because in his attempt to clear Luke's name, he unintentionally puts suspicion on Laura. It is eventually revealed that Laura's defense attorney, Justus Ward had killed Smith.

=== The Cassadines' return (1996–1999) ===
Just as quickly as Laura gets cleared of murder charges, Lesley Lu (Lulu) suddenly becomes gravely ill. While Laura had seemed to become quite the "paitron saint," Francis subtly revealed "cracks in Laura's stalwart surface" when her daughter's life is hanging in the balance. Francis wowed viewers and critics as Laura suffers through the ordeal feeling helpless. However, "[she] must keep it together – asking questions, filling out paperwork, comforting her daughter." However, "Laura's world has been shattered." Laura's desperation facilitates the reintroduction of the Cassadine family who become quite the threat to Luke and Laura's family. Laura contacts Stavros's brother Stefan Cassadine (Stephen Nichols) for help. Stefan sends his nephew Nikolas Cassadine (Tyler Christopher) to donate his bone marrow to save Lulu and Laura is forced to admit that Nikolas is actually her son with Stavros conceived during her time in captivity. It is soon revealed that Laura and Stefan had a love affair during her captivity. "At one time, she genuinely loved him because she thought Luke was dead" Francis said of Laura's "underlying" feelings for Stefan. As Luke and Laura prepare to celebrate their anniversary, the writers explore Stefan and Laura's romance through a series of flashbacks. A bitter feud erupts with, not only between Luke and Stefan, but also between Nikolas and Lucky with Laura in the middle. At one point, Luke plans drugs on Nikolas. Stefan has no qualms about putting Lucky in harms way to avenge Nikolas. According to Francis, "in Laura's fantasy world, she would stay married to Luke, he would accept [Nikolas]," the brothers would get along and "Stefan would drop by the house for dinner." Geary said the Cassadines bring a much needed conflict to the duo. Though Luke and Laura seem unshakable, "this is doing it" Geary said.

== Storylines ==
=== 1974–1984 ===
Stacey Baldwin who originated the role of Laura opposite Judy Lewis (Barbara Vining) in 1975.

In 1974, Dr. Lesley Williams (Denise Alexander) is shocked to learn that one of her patients, Florence Grey (Anne Collings) is actually the wife of her former lover Professor Gordon Grey (Sherman Howard) who had fathered her deceased daughter. Gordon wants to be with Lesley, but she convinces him to stay with his wife and they eventually leave town. Lesley then marries the wealthy Cameron Faulkner (Don Matheson), only to learn from dying patient Doris Roach (Meg Wyllie), a former nurse at General Hospital, that her daughter is actually alive. Lesley's father had paid Doris to switch Lesley's healthy baby with the deceased child of Jason Vining (Richard Rust) and his wife Barbara (Judy Lewis). Jason, a teacher, struggles to make ends meet to take care of his family. Laura (Stacey Baldwin) hopes for a new typewriter for Christmas in 1975, but Barbara has to tell her 'no' because they can't afford it. Lesley's determination to make contact with Laura puts a strain on her marriage. Lesley is overjoyed when she finally sees Laura for the first time at a candy store. Lesley follows her to a park and Laura is captivated when they meet. Lesley promises to buy Laura a new bike and a new typewriter, making Amy jealous and the Vinings uneasy. Lesley finally confesses that Laura is her daughter and Laura is thrilled. Lesley launches a custody suit and the judge postpones the final decision to allow Laura to get to know her biological mother first. Lesley receives temporary custody of Laura for 30 days. Though Laura enjoys her new life, she is not sure about making it permanent. At Laura's request, the judge extends the trial period for another 30 days. Laura becomes ill and Lesley's psychiatrist colleague, Dr. Peter Taylor (Craig Huebing), deems that it is due to emotional stress. Lesley makes the devastating choice to call off the custody suit and sends Laura back to live with the Vinings. In an attempt to keep Laura out of his life permanently, Cameron pays a nurse to claim that Laura was not Lesley's daughter after all. Fortunately, Lesley knows this is a lie. In the summer of 1976, Cameron pays the Vinings to leave town with Laura for good.

In February 1977, Lesley tracks down a bitter Laura living in a commune in Canada. Laura mistakenly blames Lesley for abandoning her. Lesley tells Laura of Cameron's schemes and convinces her to come home with her. The commune leader threatens them, however, forcing Lesley's friend and love interest, Dr. Rick Webber (Michael Gregory), to rescue them. Laura falls for law student Scott Baldwin, and is so distraught when he rejects her that she starts an affair with Rick's friend, David Hamilton (Jerry Ayres). Laura accidentally causes David's death when he rejects her for Lesley. Laura does not remember the incident and Lesley confesses to the murder. When Lesley is convicted, Laura confesses and is sentenced to probation. As her life spirals out of control, Scott and Laura reunite and become engaged on her 17th birthday. After they wed, Laura must get a job to help Scott pay for law school.

Laura ends up working for Luke Spencer at the campus disco. Luke is managing the campus disco for mobster Frank Smith, who orders Luke to kill a local senator. Luke declines to do so. As Laura tries to comfort a distressed Luke, he rapes her. Although Laura forgives him, the rape ignites a lifelong feud between Luke and Scott. Laura initially tries to avoid Luke, but they continue to end up together when they both start working at ELQ.

In 1979, Luke and Laura end up on the run and solve the mystery of the left-handed boy. The duo later teams up again to stop Mikkos Cassadine (John Colicos) from freezing the world. Now realizing how much they love each other, Laura divorces Scott in 1981 and marries Luke shortly after, while Mikkos's widow, Helena (Elizabeth Taylor) puts a curse on the couple for her husband's death. Laura's friend, Tiffany Hill (Sharon Wyatt) gets Laura a modeling job as "Ms. Star Eyes," but Laura suddenly disappears after being kidnapped by David Gray (Paul Rosilli) and presumed dead.

In 1983, it is revealed that Laura is being held by Mikkos and Helena's son, Stavros (John Martinuzzi), who has convinced Laura that Luke is dead. Sick of her son's obsession, Helena reveals that Luke is alive and allows Laura to escape. A confrontation with Luke ends with Stavros's death. The couple attempted to settle into their roles in politics, but found the roles stifling. They decided to leave Port Charles that year in order to see the world.

In 1984, Robert helped Luke when he was accused of murder in Mexico so that Luke would be free to be with Laura. When Luke was finally cleared, he returned to Laura, who announced the joyous news that she was pregnant. The Spencers immediately shared their news with their friends. With the revelation, Luke and Laura made what seemingly would be their last appearance on General Hospital. In the following years, passing references to the couple would be made by several characters.

Later that year, Laura's mother Lesley appears to die in a car accident (later revealed to be arranged by the Cassadine family).

=== 1993–2002 ===
The couple's 1993 return coincides with the introduction of their son, Lucky (Jonathan Jackson). They are forced to abandon their diner in British Columbia to escape Frank Smith (Mitchell Ryan). Back in Port Charles, Laura is falsely accused of Damian Smith (Leigh McCloskey)'s murder. Fortunately she is acquitted when her lawyer, Justus Ward (Joseph C. Phillips) confesses. In 1996, Laura must bring her son, Nikolas (Tyler Christopher) to town to save an ailing Lulu. She is also reunited with Stefan (Stephen Nichols) which puts a strain on the marriage when Luke is falsely led to believe that Nikolas is Stefan's son, and that Laura tried to reclaim him in 1984 which led to Lesley's "murder" at the hands of Helena (Constance Towers); however, it is revealed that Helena faked Lesley's death. Laura has a nervous breakdown when Lucky is "killed" in a fire and leaves town to recover. When Katherine Bell (Mary Beth Evans) is murdered, Laura is a suspect and Stefan confesses to protect her. While trying to clear her name, Laura discovers that Stefan knew Helena had faked Lucky's death and she breaks up with him. Luke, Laura and Felicia Jones (Kristina Wagner) team up to find Lucky (Jacob Young) who has been brainwashed by Helena to hate his parents. Upset about Luke's affair with Felicia, Laura borrows money from Sonny Corinthos (Maurice Benard) and buys Deception Cosmetics from Scott, as a way of asserting her independence pitting her against Luke's niece, Carly Corinthos (Sarah Brown). Upon their divorce in June 2001, Laura leaves town after a failed reunion with Scott. Meanwhile, Luke faces another hurdle when Helena resurrects Stavros (Robert Kelker-Kelly) who begins wreaking havoc on Port Charles. Laura returns in February 2002 and helps Luke regain his memory after he is kidnapped by Helena and they admit their love for one another and then reunites with Luke. The couple plans to remarry, but Laura suffers a nervous breakdown after uncovering repressed memories of killing Rick's mistress, Theresa Carter (Alicia Arden) and she is led to believe that she killed Rick; Scott is forced to have Laura committed when she goes into a state of shock and reverts to her teenage self. Laura eventually falls into a catatonic state.

=== 2006–2013 ===
In 2006, a now teenage Lulu (Julie Marie Berman) visits Laura as she contemplates an abortion. In October 2006, Laura wakes up thanks to the efforts of Patrick Drake and Robin Scorpio (Jason Thompson and Kimberly McCullough) and shares a tearful reunion with Luke, Nikolas, Lucky (Greg Vaughan) and Lulu. Despite Luke's recent marriage to heiress, Tracy Quartermaine (Jane Elliot), everyone agrees to help Laura and Luke celebrate their 25th wedding anniversary with a ceremony. However, Laura's condition quickly deteriorates and she is forced to return to Shadybrook. As she slips back into catatonia, Laura admits that she doesn't believe she killed Rick. Nikolas, Scott and Luke continue to battle over what is best for Laura with Nikolas retaining sole guardianship. Lulu does some investigating and proves that Scott actually killed Rick.

In 2008, an institutionalized Lulu hallucinates Laura's recovery when she must cope with her accidental murder of Logan Hayes (Josh Duhon), Scott's son. When Laura's doctors confirm that her condition has not changed, Nikolas and Lucky realize Lulu is getting worse. When Scott threatens to avenge Logan murder, Laura wakes up to defend her daughter. Scott tells Laura the truth about her last wedding to Luke and they run off to California. Luke, thinking they are eloping, follows where Scott and Laura end up in a car accident. Luke saves Laura when the car goes over a cliff and they end up at a wooded cabin where they discuss their relationship. Laura eventually goes to Paris, France to stay at the clinic that administers the LS-49 treatment. After telling Luke to move on, Laura boards a plane to France; unbeknownst to her, Scott is on the plane.

In February 2013, Laura reappears in Port Charles, and witnesses a close moment between Luke and Anna Devane (Finola Hughes). She then surprises Lulu at The Haunted Star where she reveals that she met up with Lucky in Ireland. Laura also reconnects with Elizabeth and meets Lucky's son, Aiden for the first time. On Valentine's Day, Luke and Laura share a brief reunion. The past comes back to haunt them when Lulu and husband Dante Falconeri (Dominic Zamprogna) reveal that someone sent Lulu a replica of the original Ice Princess diamond. Scott then arrives and reveals that he and Laura are back together. Their impending nuptials are derailed when Lulu is kidnapped by a very much alive Stavros Cassadine. Nikolas suddenly arrives with news of Lulu's whereabouts and is immediately shot. They eventually end up on Cassadine Island where they confront Stavros. Dante frees Lulu and Laura traps Stavros in the cryogenic chamber he held Lulu in. They are shocked when Lulu refuses to go home and claims Stavros as her husband. Laura wants to postpone her wedding to Scott until Lulu regains her memories but after a kiss with Luke, Laura realizes she needs to move on. Laura and Scott are married on May 20, 2013, at Nikolas's castle Wyndemere by her mother Lesley. Laura makes plans to revive Deception Cosmetics with Lucy Coe (Lynn Herring) but those plans are derailed when she goes to help a gravely ill Luke against Scott's wishes. Luke and Laura return to Port Charles and reunites with their family only Scott to reveal he is filing for divorce. Laura then returns to Paris for her annual check up.

=== 2015–present ===
Two years pass when Laura shows up at the engagement party for Luke and Tracy and announces that her feelings for Luke are as strong as ever. After Luke and Laura talk privately, he announces that his engagement to Tracy is off. Secretly, Luke and Laura admit that they could never truly be together again, but because of a family crisis, they must pretend to be. It appears that Lucky has been kidnapped and when they arrive in Canada, they encounter Luke's old fiancée, Jennifer Smith, who demands one night with Luke in exchange for Lucky. However, she doesn't really have Lucky and because of the amount of wine both consumed, they don't spend the night together. Next, they encounter a gun-wielding Holly Sutton who informs them that now Ethan is missing. The kidnappers send them a picture of a tied up and gagged Lucky and Ethan. Through the photo, Luke, Laura and Holly discover clues thanks to Lucky and Ethan and it leads them to their location. This leads them to another old enemy of Luke's, the still very much alive Frank Smith, now paralyzed as a result of Luke's gun battle with him 22 years before. Frank demands the life of Laura, knowing that this would leave the already emotionally fragile Luke a broken man. But at the last moment, Lucky storms in, and with a blast of gunfire, Frank Smith's guards are dead. Luke pumps Frank full of lead, this time sending the aging mobster to his death for sure. Lucky informs them that he had to play along with Frank Smith to save his son Jake. When Luke and Laura discover that Helena wants to see Luke, Luke goes alone and learns a shocking truth, that their grandson Jake (whom Luke believed he had run over in his car while drunk) is very much alive. Meanwhile, Dillon Quartermaine (Robert Palmer Watkins) returns to Port Charles after having followed Luke and Laura, having discovered that Luke is still in love with Tracy and that his reconciliation with Laura was only to save their son. Luke later leaves Port Charles for good. Laura stays behind for a little while learning that her son, Nikolas, is hiding the truth about Jason Morgan being alive, and he is Jake Doe. Jason does not remember himself because he has amnesia once again after Ava Jerome ran him over with her car. Laura also learns that Nikolas hired a hit man to kill Hayden Barnes, but Hayden ended up in a coma. Laura, disappointed in her son, leaves town again.

Laura returns a few months later at the doorsteps of Patrick Drake. Laura is about to tell Patrick and Sam McCall that Jake Doe is really Jason Morgan, but she decides not to after she learns that Patrick and Sam are engaged. Laura then moves into Wyndemere. She is concerned for Nikolas, and she does not understand why he is involved with Hayden again, and why he let Hayden into his home. Nikolas wants to keep a close eye on Hayden, but he ends up falling in love with her. The truth about Jason eventually comes out. Laura's daughter, Lulu, also found out that her husband, Dante, had a one stand with her cousin, Valerie Spencer, on the 4th of July when they were in Canada.

Laura's longtime nemesis, Helena Cassadine, dies in November 2015 after Nikolas poisoned her with a cup of tea. Helena had Scotty Baldwin represent her last will and testimony, and Laura was surprised to find out that she was included in her will. The will was read in March 2016, and Helena gave Laura a "key to something that she has loved and lost." The key opened to an old box in the Wyndemere attic, and Laura and Lulu found Scotty Baldwin's old law school book. Laura, confused by what that meant, decided to seek for help from a cryptographer. She meets with a cryptographer, and she is surprise to learn that Kevin Collins is the cryptographer that she has been speaking with. Kevin and Laura decide to start by looking at the Campus Disco; while visiting the Campus Disco, Kevin and Laura learn that the Campus Disco is now owned by Lloyd and Lucy Johnson, her and Luke's aliases when they went on the run from Frank Smith.

In July 2016, Laura and Kevin go to Cassadine Island to search for more clues along with Dante and Lulu. They are shocked to see Nikolas, who was presumed dead, with Ava Jerome along with Jason and Sam Morgan. A local fisherman named Theo Hart robs the island, but it was no robbery, and Theo Hart was the long lost evil son of Mikkos Cassadine, Valentin Cassadine. Valentin ostensibly murders Nikolas, and he shoots Kevin.

Laura returns to Port Charles to get Kevin to the hospital to treat his gun shot wound. Laura and Kevin make love one August night; however, the next morning, Laura is heartbroken to find out that Kevin has been writing a novel about her adventure behind her back. Laura feels that Kevin has betrayed her trust. Laura is relieved to hear from Robert Scorpio that Luke is alive and well. After Valentin tries to kidnap her grandson, Spencer Cassadine, Laura sends Spencer away to boarding school. Laura goes with Spencer to make sure he is adjusted and to keep her distance from Kevin.

A month later, Kevin tracks down Laura on an airplane to apologize to her. Laura accepts his apology, and they start seeing each other. Meanwhile, Laura learns that she has a granddaughter, Charlotte Cassadine, through Lulu, but Valentin Cassadine is the father. Helena stole Valentin's sperm and fertilized the eggs she stole when she kidnapped Lulu in 2013 to create Charlotte. Laura supports Lulu though a nasty custody battle over Charlotte against the man who murdered Laura's son and Lulu's brother. They are devastated when the judge awards Valentin and his new wife Nina Reeves full custody of Charlotte.

== Reception ==
In 2023, Charlie Mason from Soaps She Knows placed Laura first place on his ranked list of General Hospital’s 40+ Greatest Characters of All Time, commenting "Reunited with her birth mother? Check. Crushed on Mom’s man? Check. Abducted to a Greek isle? Check. Played dead? Nervous breakdown? Elected mayor? Check, check and also check. If it could happen to a soap-opera heroine, it happened to Genie Francis’ erstwhile Miss Star Eyes, along the way making her not just beloved but iconic."

In December 2024, Francis' work opposite Elliot, was named by TV Insider as their fourth best performance, in ranking their "21 Best Soap Performances of 2024". In the article, editor Michael Maloney wrote: "We saw Laura make the decision to follow Tracy into the hallway at General Hospital after she visited a comatose Lulu. Both women cautiously assessed how the other might be feeling. Tracy didn't want to infringe on Laura's time with her daughter. A vulnerable Laura wanted to reach out to Tracy, who's not always known for her ability to connect emotionally. In a quiet, "small" scene, which soaps are famous for, Laura thanked Tracy for being there for her daughter when she couldn't be."
