= The Nanny Express =

2008 American television film

- Written by: Judith Heiman Kriegsman; Stephen Langford; Riley Weston
- Directed by: Bradford May
- Starring: Vanessa Marcil; Dean Stockwell; Brennan Elliott
- Country of origin: United States
- Original language: English

Production
- Producers: Matt Fitzsimons; Erik Heiberg; James Wilberger
- Cinematography: Yaron Levy
- Running time: 120 minutes
- Production company: Larry Levinson Productions
- Budget: $2.2 million

Original release
- Network: Hallmark Channel
- Release: July 11, 2008

The Nanny Express is a Hallmark Channel television film. It premiered on Hallmark Channel on July 11, 2008, and stars Vanessa Marcil, Dean Stockwell, and Brennan Elliott.

== Plot ==
After the passing of their mother three years prior, Ben and Emily have driven their father David crazy by driving away 20 nannies with sabotaged appliances and Ben's pet rat in the clothes. The film shows a life of a young girl, Kate, who looks after her dad. She is looking for work and Beverly Hills offers her a job as a nanny for David’s family. The children take an immediate dislike to her as she is "just another maid." After all the incidents, she takes it surprisingly well yet the kids expect her to leave. After a while of shenanigans, Kate and Ben become friends yet Emily keeps her distance. Eventually, David reveals to Kate that his wife was hit and killed by a drunk driver which badly affected Emily as this happened on her birthday. Emily doesn't want her father to date Kate and plans to set him up with her ballet teacher.

== Cast ==
- Vanessa Marcil as Kate Hewitt
- Dean Stockwell as Jerry Hewitt
- Brennan Elliott as David Chandler
- Natalie Dreyfuss as Emily Chandler
- Uriah Shelton as Ben Chandler
- Stacy Keach as Reverend McGregor
- David Barry Gray as Chris Wells

== Reception ==
Nanny Express did well for Hallmark Channel on the date of its premiere. The film became the highest-rated cable movie of the day and week that it premiered with a 3.1 HH (household) rating, 2.7 million homes and 3.6 million total viewers. " What starts out to be a comedy about two very mean kids who are always making their nannies quit turns into a romantic movie about a nanny falling for her boss.", wrote a review on Dove.org. A negative review at Soap Opera Network stated that "the movie [was] a flat out mess. The worst of all? You can’t catch a scene without some dose of music that is supposed to warm the heart, but borders on annoyance instead. If you are looking for quality writing, this isn’t for you. Otherwise, if you are looking for heartfelt melodrama, tune right in!"
