= Ingo Rademacher =

German-born, Australian television actor (born 1971)

- Born: 22 April 1971 (age 55); Iserlohn, West Germany
- Occupation: Actor
- Years active: 1993–present
- Spouse: Ehiku Rademacher (m. 2009)
- Children: 3

Ingo Rademacher (born 22 April 1971) is a German-Australian television actor known for his roles of Sean Hayden on the Australian soap opera Paradise Beach, Jasper "Jax" Jacks on the American daytime soap opera General Hospital, which he played in multiple stints from 1996 to 2021, and Thorne Forrester on The Bold and the Beautiful. In 2012, he played Officer Sacks in the film Alex Cross. Rademacher placed 5th on the 16th season of Dancing with the Stars in 2013.

== Career ==
Rademacher played Sean Hayden on the Australian soap opera Paradise Beach from 1993 until 1994. In July 1995, Rademacher filmed a guest role as Peter, a jeweller and friend of Holly Winton (played by Kimberley Davenport), in Echo Point.

General Hospital producer Wendy Riche saw his (unsuccessful) audition tape for the soap opera The City and immediately cast him as suave tycoon Jasper "Jax" Jacks. a role he played from 1996 to 2013, and then on and off from 2016 to 2021. During a one-year break from General Hospital, Rademacher appeared on the short-lived 2000 primetime soap opera Titans. Jax reappeared on General Hospital on 23 August 2012. He returned to the show for a several-week-long story arc in 2016. That same year, he also had a recurring role as Robert Coughlin on Hawaii Five-0.

Rademacher was a contestant on the 16th season of Dancing with the Stars and was partnered with two-time champion Kym Johnson.

In September 2017, it was announced that Rademacher had joined the cast of The Bold and the Beautiful in the role of Thorne Forrester. He made his first appearance on 27 November 2017. In December 2018, Rademacher announced he had chosen to not renew his deal with the soap and would vacate the role.

On 14 February 2019, he announced he was returning to General Hospital. On 8 November 2021, it was reported Rademacher would be leaving General Hospital after refusing to comply with the production's vaccine mandate, and the following month he announced he was suing ABC over its vaccine mandate. In June 2023, a Los Angeles judge ruled in favour of ABC.

== Personal life ==
Rademacher previously dated then-General Hospital co-star Rebecca Herbst in the late 1990s. In 2008, Rademacher and his then girlfriend Ehiku had a son. In 2009, Rademacher and Ehiku married, and they had another son together, born in 2012. In February 2021, he announced the couple were expecting their third child. In June 2021, Rademacher and Ehiku welcomed a daughter.

Rademacher and his wife Ehiku own Mahiku, an activewear store in Hawaii.

== Other ==
Rademacher sat on the board of Heal the Bay, a Santa Monica-based environmental organization.

== Filmography ==
Year	Title	Role	Notes
1993–1994	Paradise Beach	Sean Hayden	Unknown episodes
1995	Echo Point	Peter	Unknown episodes
1996–2013; 2016–2017; 2019–2021	General Hospital	Jasper Jacks	Series regular
1996	Clueless	Kip Killmore	Episode: "Kiss Me Kip"
1997	Veronica's Closet	Reg	Episode: Pilot
2000–2001	Titans	David O'Connor	11 episodes
2003	Intimate Portrait	Himself	Episode: "Vanessa Marcil"
2004	According to Jim	Ted	Episodes: "When You Wish to Be a Star: Parts 1 & 2"
2004	1 Day With...	Himself	Episode #1.1
2011	Hawaii Five-0	Malcolm Schafer	Episode: "Pahele (Trapped)"
2012	Alex Cross	Officer Sacks	Film
2013	Dancing with the Stars	Himself	Contestant on season 16 (5th place)
2016	Hawaii Five-0	Robert Coughlin	3 episodes
2017–2019	The Bold and the Beautiful	Thorne Forrester	Series regular Role from: 27 November 2017 to 14 February 2019
2017	A Royal Christmas Ball	King Charles of Baltamia	Film
2017–2018	Counterpart	Friedrich	2 episodes

== See also ==
- German Australian
