= Sonny Corinthos =

Fictional character from General Hospital

- General Hospital character
- Maurice Benard as Sonny Corinthos
- Portrayed by: Maurice Benard (1993–present); Joshua Benard (2018)
- Duration: 1993–present
- First appearance: August 13, 1993
- Created by: Bill Levinson
- Introduced by: Wendy Riche
- Book appearances: Robin's Diary; The Secret Life of Damian Spinelli
- Spin-off appearances: General Hospital: Twist of Fate (1996); Port Charles; General Hospital: Night Shift
In-universe information
- Other names: Michael Corinthos Jr.
- Occupation: Entrepreneur; Mob boss; Don of the Northern Seafront; Busser (2021)
- Parents: Mike Corbin; Adela Corinthos
- Stepfather: Deke Woods
- Half-brothers: Ric Lansing
- Half-sisters: Courtney Matthews
- Wife: Lily Rivera (1996); Carly Corinthos (2000–2005, 2007, 2015–2022) (Note: They were married consecutively from 2000 to 2005.); Claudia Zacchara (2008–2009); Brenda Barrett (2011); Nina Reeves (2023–2024)
- Sons: Dante Falconeri; Morgan Corinthos
- Daughters: Kristina Davis; Lila McCall; Avery Corinthos; Donna Corinthos
- Adoptive sons: Michael Corinthos
- Grandsons: Gio Palmieri; Rocco Falconeri; Wiley Cooper-Jones (adoptive)
- Granddaughters: Amelia Corinthos (adoptive); Irene Davis-Ashford; Daisy Gilmore (adoptive)
- Nephews: Spencer Cassadine
- Nieces: Molly Lansing

Sonny Corinthos is a fictional character on the ABC soap opera General Hospital. Maurice Benard has played the role of the manic depressive mob kingpin, living in Port Charles, since the character's storyline originated on August 13, 1993. Sonny is also known for supercouple pairings with Brenda Barrett and Carly Corinthos. Since joining the show, he has become a central character, with many storylines focusing on his family, friends, and criminal enterprise.

== Creation ==
=== Background ===
The character was originally scripted as being of Italian descent. However, it later revealed that Sonny is raised in the predominantly Italian neighborhood of Bensonhurst, Brooklyn. On his father's side, Sonny is of Greek and Irish descent. On his mother's side, Sonny is of Cuban descent. Michael Corinthos Jr. is born on April 20, 1965, to Michael and Adela Corinthos. In 2012, Sonny's birth year was revised to 1969 when his aged was listed as forty-two on his arrest records. After Mike abandons his family, Adela becomes involved with her boss, Trevor Lansing. Trevor is very understanding of the single mother, allowing Sonny to come to work with Adela, and even taking them on vacations to Martha's Vineyard. However, Trevor despises the young Sonny and when Adela gets pregnant Trevor proposes; however, he forces Adela to choose between Sonny and their unborn child when Sonny accidentally causes a pregnant Adela to fall down a flight of stairs.

Adela gives up rights to her son shortly after birth and when Sonny is seven years old, she marries New York Police officer Deke Woods. However, Deke is extremely abusive to mother and son. Sonny is claustrophobic due to being locked in the closet as a child by Deke. To direct Deke's attention away from his mother, Sonny begins acting out. Sonny uses his friends to escape his home life. He grows up with Lois Cerullo and is best friends with her brother, Louie. Raised by Adela, a devout Catholic, Sonny attends catholic school and is also very religious. In his early teen years Sonny briefly dates Olivia Falconeri. Following the end of their relationship, Sonny becomes involved with Olivia's cousin, Connie Falconeri. Noticing Sonny and Deke's fights are getting more violent, and fearing one of them would end up dead, Adela asks Sonny to leave home when he is sixteen. For a while, Sonny is homeless and visits Adela when Deke is working.

After stealing his car, local mob boss, Joe Scully takes Sonny under his wing giving him a place to live while Sonny works odd jobs for him. When Sonny goes to visit Adela on her birthday, he finds her severely beaten and unconscious. Sonny confides in Scully who has Deke killed the next day. Adela passes away a few years later, when Sonny is nineteen. Sonny and Connie make plans to run away together once she is eighteen. However, once Connie skips town without him, Sonny goes to work for Scully full-time. Scully sends Sonny to Atlantic City to run a strip club called The Sea Breeze when his son, Joe Jr. proves to be incompetent. Sonny befriends one of the strippers, Theresa, whom Joe Jr. is infatuated with. In a jealous rage, Joe Jr. kills Theresa. Scully helps him disappear while Sonny lies to the cops about Theresa's murder, one of which is Theresa's brother, then FBI agent, John McBain.

=== Casting ===
According to General Hospital casting director, Mark Teschner, Benard was one of the few actors being considered for the role. Benard came in for a meeting with Wendy Riche, and the two immediately clicked. It was only a matter of how long it would take to get Benard on screen. Initially, the character was only supposed to last for six months as Benard was not interested in anything more than a year. Benard revealed that after his stint on All My Children, he was not interested in doing another soap. He joined the cast of General Hospital because he had gone broke and acting was all he knew at the time. The producers offered him two separate roles, that of mobster Damian Smith, with a two-year contract, and that of Sonny. In addition the role being short term, Benard also chose the role because he liked the character's name. Benard revealed that just two weeks after starting work, he suffered a manic depressive breakdown. At one point he had stopped coming in to work but expressed his gratitude to the network for keeping faith in him instead of firing him immediately.

The role of Sonny Corinthos originated in the final weeks of Bill Levinson's tenure as head writer, in August 1993, prior to Levinson's replacement by Claire Labine. The role was originally intended as a six-month stint. After four years with the series, Benard vacated the role on September 24, 1997. After a brief return from May 15 to July 8, 1998, Benard returned to the role full-time on December 18, 1998. In December 2014, Benard confirmed he had re-signed with the series, for an undisclosed amount of time.

=== Characterization ===
Like the character of Sonny, Maurice Benard also has bipolar disorder. Benard stated, "When I let it be known I was bipolar, we wrote it into the character." During 2006, Corinthos had an onscreen breakdown due to his bipolar disorder. The parallels between the story and Benard's real life experiences had Benard believing he was having his own "fourth break down," though Benard credits staying on his medication as keeping him grounded. His willingness to integrate his real life medical condition into Sonny's storylines have raised visibility of the disease, leading to Benard appearing on shows such as The Oprah Winfrey Show to discuss the disease as well as being the spokesman for the Depression and Bipolar Support Alliance.

The name of Michael "Sonny" Corinthos, as well as his occupation, is a reference to The Godfather characters Michael Corleone and Sonny Corleone. These characters have a sister named Connie Corleone, which is alluded to in Kate Howard's real name, Connie Falconeri. Similarities have also been noted between Sonny and Tony Soprano from The Sopranos and the characters that surround them both. Vincent Pastore, who portrayed Big Pussy Bonpensiero on The Sopranos, came on the show to portray Maximus Giambetti, father of Sonny's bodyguards Milo Giambetti and Max Giambetti.

Benard has described Sonny as "unpredictable," and stated that: "You never know from one second to the next what he is thinking, feeling or planning. He's a man in personal conflict who maintains an outward appearance of calm at all times, at any cost."

== Storylines ==
=== 1990s ===
Sonny came to Port Charles in 1993, running a strip club for Frank Smith. He becomes involved with Karen Wexler, and gets her addicted to drugs to get her to work for him. Meanwhile, Sonny begins dating the young Brenda Barrett, the beginning of a popular Supercouple for the soap. He also befriends Stone Cates, Robin Scorpio and Frank's longtime employee, Luke Spencer. Brenda, who is more attracted to Sonny than to his mob ties, introduces him to an old Bensonhurst friend, Lois Cerullo, who needed Sonny's money to finance a record label. The romance of Sonny and Brenda takes off amidst their new business relationship as partners of the record label, L&B. Sonny travels to Puerto Rico to work security for L&B artist Miguel Morez. He informs the locals that Miguel is under the protection of Frank Smith's organization. Miguel soon begins flirting with a now-model Brenda, which makes Sonny jealous. While Brenda and Miguel bond, Sonny opens up to her about his abusive childhood at the hands of his step-father, Deke. The two reconcile.

Luke kills Frank to protect Sonny, and Sonny informs Frank's partner, Hernando Rivera, that he is taking over Frank's organization. Rivera kidnaps his daughter, Lily, Miguel, Sonny and Brenda; they later escape and return to the U.S. After they are rushed to safety, Sonny plots his next move, pretending to leave the mafia. Due to mafia ties, Sonny and Luke's club is blown up; that same night, Sonny discovers that Luke's driver, Mike Corbin, is actually his father, Michael Corinthos, Sr. After Stone is diagnosed with AIDS, Sonny takes him in. Sonny learned that Frank's son, Damian, is working with Joe Scully to sabotage shipments from Deception cosmetics. Sonny is reticent to take action against Scully, as he is the man responsible for saving Sonny from his abusive step father. During a confrontation at the docks, Mike is shot, and Sonny kills Scully, who was attempting to finish Mike off. Scully's henchmen go after Brenda, Stone and the Spencers, looking for revenge. Lily learns that Brenda is planning to record Sonny discussing his mob business and hand it over to the police. Sonny furiously throws Brenda out and begins dating Lily, though they take their relationship slowly. Sonny wants to forgive Brenda because her intent was never to turn him in.

Stone dies from AIDS, and his girlfriend Robin learns she has contracted HIV. After Stone's death, Sonny illegally pays for Stone's hospital bills. Sonny is arrested and Lily turns to her father, reconciling with him in exchange for his help. Rivera makes a deal that he will keep Sonny out of prison if he marries Lily. Sonny marries Lily, though Lily realizes that Sonny still loves Brenda and offers a divorce. Sonny refuses to leave Lily because he fears reprisals from Rivera, though he finds it hard to deny his feelings for Brenda. Instead, he takes Lily on a second honeymoon. After being trapped in an avalanche at a ski resort on the honeymoon, Brenda and Sonny agree to reconcile. However, Lily reveals she's pregnant before Sonny can ask for a divorce. Brenda lets Sonny go, acknowledging his need to be an available father. Sonny and Brenda kiss passionately and declare their undying love for each other. Much to Sonny's dismay, Brenda moves on with Jasper "Jax" Jacks. Sadly, Lily dies in a car bombing targeting Sonny, killing her and the baby. Sonny finds out Rivera was responsible, and helps him die, later taking over Rivera's organization. Upon Lily's death, Sonny inherited 30 million dollars, which he donated to General Hospital to create a hospital wing in Stone's name.

When Jason Morgan suffers brain damage after a car accident, he confides in Sonny. Jason would later become Sonny's enforcer and closest friend. On Jax and Brenda's wedding day, Sonny shows up with Jax's wife, Miranda Jameson, who was believed to be dead. After Jax leaves Brenda to make sense of it all, Brenda and Sonny reconcile. When attempting to save Brenda, Sonny is drugged. When Sonny is brought to the hospital, Sonny tells Brenda he loves her. Believing her marriage with Jax can work, she rejects Sonny. Sonny's former henchman, Harry Silver, arrives in town causing problems for Brenda and Sonny, leading Sonny to kill him. Fearing the mob life is too dangerous for him and Brenda, he offers to marry her and leave town together. Sonny declares that he loves his life and has worked hard for it, but he loves Brenda more. After a nightmare where Brenda is blown up in a car bomb, Sonny decides he'd rather lose Brenda than see her die. Sonny sends Jason to the altar to end things for him. Sonny leaves town soon after his aborted wedding with Brenda.

Sonny returns to Port Charles, and is devastated to learn Brenda died months before. He is later approached by Robin, who wants his help getting Carly Quartermaine, the wife of Jason's brother, A.J., away from Jason. He soon begins dating waitress Hannah Scott, who looks a lot like Brenda. Sonny is devastated to learn that his new love is actually an undercover FBI agent and he feeds her false information before breaking up with her. Sonny and Carly later have a one-night stand, and she becomes pregnant.

=== 2000s ===
Sonny digs up dirt on A.J. and forced him into granting Carly a divorce and signing over his rights to their son, Michael, whom A.J. had been threatening to take away. After Carly miscarries their child, she and Sonny bond and marry; they renew their vows after realizing how much they love one another. Sonny also adopts Michael. Sonny divorces Carly after she tries to force him out of the mob, and sleeps with his attorney, Alexis Davis. Sonny and Carly later reconcile and remarry. Meanwhile, A.J. marries Sonny's long lost sister, Courtney Matthews, hoping to use her to get Michael back.

Luis Alcazar soon arrives in town and brings Brenda back to Port Charles. Luis, jealous of Brenda's past with Sonny, nearly kills Sonny outside the church where she and Sonny almost married. Attorney Ric Lansing comes to town, and reveals that he is Sonny's half-brother who was given up by their mother Adela. Ric blames Sonny for his wife Elizabeth's miscarriage, though it was actually Faith Rosco who was responsible. Ric kidnaps a pregnant Carly, planning to give the child to Elizabeth. Carly is taken from Ric by Lorenzo Alcazar, Luis's brother who tries to use Carly as leverage against Sonny. When Sonny comes to rescue Carly, he accidentally shoots her and she falls into a coma shortly after giving birth to Morgan Corinthos. When she wakes up, she is distant from Sonny and drawn towards Lorenzo. Believing his marriage is over, Sonny begins an affair with Sam McCall, who finds out she's pregnant just as Carly and Sonny reconcile.

To keep them from splitting up, Sam, Sonny, and Jason all claimed that Jason is the father. Not happy about the lie, Sonny confessed the truth to Carly. Though the two became distant, they eventually stayed together. However, Carly later revealed that Sonny was the father of Alexis' daughter, Kristina. Sonny and Sam's daughter was tragically stillborn, and her stem-cells are used to save a sick Kristina. Meanwhile, Carly and Sonny filed for divorce. This was stalled after Michael, Morgan, and Kristina were all kidnapped. The culprit was revealed to be A.J., with assistance from Faith, who wanted Michael back. Michael is rescued, and A.J. is killed while awaiting trial. When Michael is believed to be responsible for A.J.'s death, Sonny confesses to protect his son. He is acquitted when A.J.'s killer is revealed to be Dr. Asher Thomas. Sonny begins a relationship with Jason's sister, Emily Quartermaine, who helps Sonny face his diagnosis of bipolar disorder. They start seeing each other secretly until Jason finds out. Jason takes matters into his own hands, and forces Sonny to choose between his organization or Emily. Sonny chooses Emily, and Jason reluctantly takes over Sonny's business, forcing Sonny into retirement. Fearing for Emily's safety, Sonny stages a kiss with Carly, convincing Emily to leave him.

Sonny is jealous when he learns Carly and Jax have become engaged. When Carly witnesses Sonny shooting Lorenzo, he convinces her to marry him so she can't testify against him. After being taken hostage at the Metro Court Hotel by Jerry Jacks where his children Michael, Morgan, and Kristina were scared, Sonny tells Carly he still loves her and they have sex after the hostage crisis left his children traumatized after being debriefed. Carly still divorces him to marry Jax. Sonny soon reconnects with his first love, Connie Falconeri, now known as Kate Howard. Soon, Ric's father, Trevor comes to town with mobster Anthony Zacchara and his son, Johnny. Diego Alcazar targeted the women in Sonny and Jason's life, wanting revenge for the death of his father, Lorenzo. Kate rejects Sonny's marriage proposal, fearing for her safety; in turn, Sonny sleeps with Anthony's daughter, Claudia. A botched hit on Sonny puts Michael in a coma, devastating him and Carly. Sonny decides he wants Jason to take over the organization, and Carly forces Sonny to sign over his parental rights to Michael and Morgan in order to keep them safe. Sonny and Kate get engaged, and plan to get married. Sonny brings Kate's cousin, Olivia, to town for the ceremony. Anthony shoots Kate at the altar and frames Andrei Karpov for the shooting; Sonny kills Karpov, as a result. Sonny marries Claudia to get back into the mob.

Though it's a marriage of convenience, Sonny and Claudia actually bond and eventually have sex. Michael wakes up after surgery, and moves in with Sonny and Claudia temporarily, to keep Carly from stressing out during her high risk pregnancy. Claudia discovers she is pregnant, but is run off the road by a teenage Kristina and miscarries. Sonny later hires Dominic Pirelli as the new bodyguard for his kids. Sonny begins to trust Dominic after he saves him from a bullet and Morgan from being hit by a speeding car. Just before Claudia's birthday party, Jason informs Sonny that Claudia was behind Michael's shooting and Sonny calls her out at the party. Claudia escapes from the party by taking a pregnant Carly hostage. She is later killed by Michael, who was trying to protect Carly and her newborn daughter, Josslyn Jacks. Sonny let everyone believe he was guilty of murder to protect Michael.

=== 2010s ===
Sonny learns that Dominic is actually an undercover cop and when he comes arrests him, Sonny shoots him. Sonny is shocked to learn that "Dominic" is actually Olivia's son, Dante, and also his son. Dante survives, and shows his hatred for Sonny. When Sonny is put on trial for Claudia's murder, Michael attempts to confess. Jason, Carly and Sonny send him to Sonny's island to keep him from confessing. Meanwhile, Jax, determined to put Sonny away for good, brings in Claire Walsh to prosecute Sonny. Just as the verdict for Sonny's murder trial is about to be announced, Dante puts Michael on the stand. Sonny, Carly and Jason are devastated when Michael admits to Claudia's murder, and he is sentenced to five years in prison.

Kristina begins acting out and pretends to date Johnny Zacchara; Sonny retaliates by planting a bomb in Johnny's car, but nearly kills Kristina. Sonny and Alexis team up to co-parent Kristina so she can get to know Sonny better. Claire teams up with Johnny to put Sonny in prison, but the plan falls apart. Sonny has a brief romance with Claire before Brenda returns and they reunite. Sonny and Brenda soon get engaged and marry. Right after the wedding, Brenda is kidnapped by crime figure The Balkan, who wants revenge for Brenda killing his son, Aleksander Janáček. Sonny, Jason and Dante rescue her from Hoffman. Brenda finds out she has a son with Aleksander, named Lucian, who she thought had died in a miscarriage. Sonny is suspicious, though, and convinces Brenda to get a DNA test. Lucian goes missing, though, and Sonny, Dante, and Carly try to find him. Sonny finds out Theo's wife, Suzanne Stanwyck, is hiding Brenda's real son, Alec; he rescues Alec and reunites him with Brenda. During Carly and Jax's custody battle for Josslyn, Sonny has Jax drugged, and plants drugs in his room so that Carly would get full custody of Josslyn. When Brenda learns of Sonny's betrayal, she leaves town with Alec. Sonny is furious when he learns that Brenda left with Jax and sabotages Jax's plane, leading everyone to think he's dead. Carly sends Morgan away to military school to keep him away from Sonny.

When Sonny saves Dante from getting shot, he goes after Anthony, believing he is responsible. Anthony escapes, but his tires are shot out, and he causes an accident that kills Cole Thornhart and Hope Manning-Thornhart. Sonny is accused of the murders, and put on trial. During the trial, Sonny meets his former nemesis, Detective John McBain, who believes Sonny is responsible for killing his sister, Theresa. Sonny is found innocent of Cole and Hope's murders, but McBain is intent on making Sonny pay for Theresa's death. Starr Manning, Cole's girlfriend and Hope's mother, is furious over Sonny's acquittal, and tries to kill him. Michael talks her down, though, and she's arrested. Sonny starts to reconnect with Kate, and they resume a relationship until Sonny catches her in bed with Johnny. Todd Manning, Starr's father, tells Sonny that Kate is responsible for killing Cole and Hope because she's suffering from split personality. Kate tells Sonny her alternate personality, Connie, is the one who had sex with Johnny, and she loves him. Sonny agrees to drop the charges against Starr so Kate can get help. Sonny tells McBain that Joe Scully Jr. was responsible for killing Theresa, and later finds out Joe raped Kate, which led to her mental illness. Furious, Sonny kidnaps Joe to kill him, until McBain talks him out of it. Kate and Sonny resume their relationship, and get engaged. On their wedding day, though, it's revealed Connie is in control, and is already married to Johnny. Despite losing Kate, Sonny tries to get through to Connie. He and Connie eventually become close, which leads to Kate coming back. Upset at Sonny having sex with Connie, Kate pushes him away, but she agrees to go to a mental facility for treatment.

Kate returns, going by Connie again, and tells Sonny she has been treated, but she breaks up with Sonny to preserve her fragile mental state. Sonny lets her go, and starts growing close to Olivia. Meanwhile, A.J. is revealed to be alive after faking his death. He starts building a relationship with Michael, upsetting Sonny. Sonny finds out Morgan is in debt to bookies because of excessive gambling, and tracks him down. Morgan rebels coming home, bringing his girlfriend, Kiki Jerome, with him. Kiki's mother, Ava Jerome, follows her, and Sonny is suspicious that Ava is connect to the Jerome mob family. Jealous of Olivia, Connie decides she wants Sonny back, and the two resume their relationship after Olivia steps aside. Sadly, Connie is murdered soon after, and A.J. is the prime suspect. Sonny tries to kill A.J., but agrees to leave him alone for Michael's sake.

Sonny finds out Julian Jerome, former head of the Jerome mob, is alive, and he and his sister, Ava, are looking to gain control of Port Charles again. When Kiki breaks up with Morgan, he blames Sonny, and starts having sex with Ava and working for Julian. Morgan eventually realizes how dangerous the mob is, and Sonny helps him leave the mob. A.J. is acquitted of Connie's murder and, in a moment of rage, Sonny shoots and kills him. Carly finds out, and decides to keep the secret so Michael won't find out. Sonny, meanwhile, finds out that Ava was responsible for killing Connie. He tries to kill her, but she reveals that she's pregnant with either his child or Morgan's. Sonny decides to keep her prisoner until the baby is born before killing her. Ava escapes, though, and hides out. Sonny starts growing close to Carly again, in the meantime. When Carly's boyfriend, Franco, finds out about their affair, he spitefully reveals Sonny's crime to Michael. Furious, Michael tries to kill Sonny, and Sonny agrees to let him until Morgan and Dante talk him down. Sonny is arrested for A.J.'s murder, and is sentenced to life in prison. He hands his organization over to Duke Lavery, Julian's enemy, and asks him to keep the Jeromes from taking over.

While in prison, Sonny is threatened by Luke, who threatens his sons now that Sonny is in prison making Helena Cassadine elated. Sonny teams up with Julian, who is also being threatened by Luke, and the two break out of prison to stop him. Sonny finds a bomb on the Haunted Star ship, where Michael is throwing a party, and jumps overboard with the bomb to save Michael. Sonny survives, and is granted a pardon by the governor, since his daughter was on the ship. Sonny is released, and reconnects with Carly. He also gets custody of Avery, his daughter with Ava. However, Michael sues and wins custody of Avery, to get revenge on Sonny. Michael eventually decides to let go of his anger, and gives Avery back to Sonny. Sonny and Carly get engaged, and plan to get married. On their wedding day, Sonny is shot while trying to rescue T.J. Ashford under Jerry Jacks' orders while his longtime best friend Robin was being held captive against her will. At the hospital, it's determined he is paralyzed and needs a wheelchair. Carly stands by him, and Sonny realizes how much he loves her. The two marry in the hospital chapel. Sonny has to go to court for custody of Avery after Ava is released from prison. Ava ends up getting sole custody, infuriating Sonny.

Sonny starts to regain feeling in his legs, though he hides his progress from his family so his enemies do not find out. When Julian marries Alexis, Sonny reveals his condition when he stands up to defend Kristina from a gunman that took her hostage. Carly almost leaves him for his deception, but they stay together and unite when Morgan is diagnosed with bipolar disorder, and has to be committed to a mental facility. Duke is killed, and Sonny aims to prove Julian was responsible. He tracks down Julian's hit man, Carlos Rivera, and brings him back to Port Charles to face charges. Carlos is killed, though, before he can implicate Julian. Sonny later agrees to joint custody with Ava of Avery. Julian is arrested for killing Duke and Carlos, and is put on trial. He goes free, though, when the case falls apart. Sonny intends to retaliate, despite Carly's protests. Duke's son, Griffin Munro, manages to convince Sonny to not kill Julian after he gained Helena's stepson and Spencer's great uncle Valentin Cassadine as his new enemy. The night Sonny calls off the hit, Morgan is killed after stealing Julian's car, which exploded. Guilt-ridden, Sonny turns himself in, planning to confess to his son's murder. However, Jason tells Sonny that he is not responsible for Morgan's murder because his hit man got Sonny's message. Sonny is put on house arrest, while Jason tries to prove his innocence. After Jordan found out that Sonny was innocent that Julian's sister Olivia Jerome did it confirming Jason and Curtis' story, Sonny was free to go anywhere he likes to find Olivia Jerome who abducted Robin after his wife Carly found her first.

Sonny and Jason began their search for Cesar Faison together. While looking for him, he and Jason eventually found Valentin's cousin-in-law and Faison's daughter Britt Westbourne.

=== 2020s ===
Sonny and Jason gain Cyrus Renault from Seattle as their new enemy who was later released from prison while Britt's best friend Brad Cooper is in prison.

== Reception ==
Benard has been nominated for several Daytime Emmy Awards, including the Daytime Emmy Award for Outstanding Lead Actor (1996, 2003, 2004, 2006, 2011, 2019, 2021) winning in 2003, 2019, and 2021. Benard was also nominated in the Supporting Actor category in 1997. Benard also won two Soap Opera Digest Awards for Outstanding Lead Actor in 1996 and 2003. In 2023, Charlie Mason from Soaps She Knows placed Sonny at fifth place on his ranked list of General Hospital's 40+ Greatest Characters of All Time, commenting "By now, we’ve come to regard Maurice Benard’s dimpled don as The Godfather, Part IV. Formidable and flawed, the smooth criminal is a mass of contradictions that somehow add up to a character that’s as dangerous as he is appealing." In 2024, Mason also placed Sonny 12th on his ranked list of Soaps' 40 Most Iconic Characters of All Time, writing, "Little did Maurice Benard know in 1993 that the six-month role he'd signed on for would catch fire in such a way that the Teflon don would still be setting hearts aflame today".

== See also ==
- Sonny Corinthos and Carly Benson
