= Titans (2000 TV series) =

- Title card
- Genre: Soap opera
- Created by: Charles Pratt Jr.
- Written by: Charles Pratt Jr.
- Starring: Casper Van Dien; Yasmine Bleeth; John Barrowman; Elizabeth Bogush; Kevin Zegers; Perry King; Victoria Principal; Jack Wagner; Lourdes Benedicto; Ingo Rademacher; Josie Davis; Jason Winston George
- Opening theme: "6 Underground" by Sneaker Pimps (eps. 1–2) "The Finest Line" by Amye Williams (eps. 3–13)
- Country of origin: United States
- Original language: English
- No. of seasons: 1
- No. of episodes: 13 (2 unaired)

Production
- Executive producers: Charles Pratt Jr.; Aaron Spelling; E. Duke Vincent
- Cinematography: Steven Shaw
- Production companies: Spelling Television; NBC Studios

Original release
- Network: NBC
- Release: October 4 – December 18, 2000

Titans is an American prime time television soap opera created by Charles Pratt Jr. that aired on NBC from October 4 to December 18, 2000. Thirteen episodes were filmed, of which eleven were actually aired. Produced by Aaron Spelling, the series was initially marketed as a "Dynasty for the new millennium," attempting to emulate the style of Spelling's earlier hit series. However, low ratings led NBC to cancel the series before its first season was completed.

== Synopsis ==
Aviation magnate Richard Williams (Perry King) is engaged to the much younger Heather (Yasmine Bleeth). He is unaware that she previously had an affair with his son, Chandler (Casper Van Dien), who is a pilot. Chandler is unsure whether he should reveal this to his father. Chandler discovers that Heather is pregnant with his child. Meanwhile, Heather clashes with Richard's former wife, Gwen (Victoria Principal), who lives in a mansion across the street. After Richard and Heather marry, Chandler's scheming brother Peter (John Barrowman) finds out about her affair with Chandler.

== Cast ==
Cast of Titans (from left to right: Barrowman, Principal, Bogush, Van Dien, Davis, King, Bleeth)

- Casper Van Dien as Chandler Williams, the golden boy of the Williams family, and a former pilot in the Navy; Heather's lover
- Yasmine Bleeth as Heather Lane-Williams, Richard's second wife and Chandler's lover
- John Barrowman as Peter Williams, Richard and Gwen's manipulative son and Chandler, Jenny and Laurie's brother
- Lourdes Benedicto (Priscilla Garita in the pilot) as Samantha Sanchez, Richard's executive assistant and the daughter of the family's former maid
- Elizabeth Bogush as Jennifer "Jenny" Williams, Richard and Gwen's troubled daughter and Chandler, Peter and Laurie's sister, who struggles with alcoholism and substance abuse
- Josie Davis as Lauren "Laurie" Williams, Richard and Gwen's strait-laced daughter and Chandler, Peter and Jenny's sister, who has a rivalry with Jenny
- Jason Winston George as Scott Littleton, head of Williams Aviation, who works with Chandler
- Perry King as Richard Williams (episodes 1–5), patriarch of the Williams family, a dashing man who runs Williams Global Enterprises with an iron fist
- Victoria Principal as Gwendolyn "Gwen" Williams, Richard's ex-wife and mother of his four children. She owns a nightclub, Pulse, and a chain of hotels. She lives opposite Richard and detests his new fiancée, Heather
- Ingo Rademacher as David O'Connor, Australian surfer who works at Pulse and gets involved with both Jenny and Laurie (episodes 2–13)
- Kevin Zegers as Ethan Benchley, Gwen's nephew (episodes 3–13)
- Jack Wagner as Jack Williams, Richard's brother (episodes 6–13; guest episode 2)

== Production ==
The casting of Van Dien and King was announced in February 2000. Additional cast members included soap opera veterans Bleeth, Principal, David, and Wagner.

Titans premiered on October 4, 2000, and four additional episodes were ordered in November 2000.

== Episodes ==
No.	Title	Directed by	Written by	Original release date	US viewers (millions)
1	"Pilot"	Charles Correll	Charles Pratt Jr.	October 4, 2000	11.6
Navy pilot Chandler Williams returns home to find that his ex-lover Heather is engaged to his father.
2	"Dysfunction Junction"	Charles Correll	Charles Pratt Jr.	October 11, 2000	8.2
3	"Guess Who's Chumming for Dinner?"	Chip Chalmers	Douglas Steinberg	October 18, 2000	6.73
4	"Stormy Heather"	Michael Lange	Antoinette Stella	October 25, 2000	7.57
5	"Frisky Business"	Charles Correll	Tyler Bensinger	November 1, 2000	7.23
6	"Bad Will Hunting"	Michael Zinberg	Charles Pratt Jr.	November 8, 2000	8.5
7	"Torn Between Two Mothers"	Joel J. Feigenbaum	Barry O'Brien	November 15, 2000	N/A
8	"Desperately Seeking Heather"	Charles Correll	Laurie Zerwer	November 22, 2000	N/A
9	"Secrets & Thighs"	Mel Damski	Douglas Steinberg	December 4, 2000	6.56
10	"Angels with Dirty Minds"	Charles Correll	Charles Pratt Jr.	December 11, 2000	5.48
11	"Payback's a Bitch"	Joanna Kerns	Tyler Bensinger	December 18, 2000	N/A
12	"She Stoops to Conquer"	Anson Williams	Antoinette Stella	Unaired in the U.S. (Note: Aired only in the United Kingdom, Germany, France, Denmark, Poland, Russia and New Zealand)	N/A
13	"Someone Wicked This Way Comes"	Robert J. Metoyer	Barry O'Brien	Unaired in the U.S.	N/A

== Broadcast ==
Titans premiered on Wednesday, October 4, 2000, before the season two premiere of The West Wing. Titans attracted 11.6 million viewers and delivered key demographics for NBC, but ratings for the second and third episodes declined significantly. They climbed again for subsequent episodes, to a high of 8.5 for the sixth episode. Around this time, four additional episodes were ordered. The show averaged 8 million viewers over its initial eight weeks, ranking 83rd overall.

Titans was moved to Mondays starting with its ninth episode on December 4, 2000, taking over the timeslot previously held by cancelled sitcoms Daddio and Tucker. Ed, a dramedy which had premiered the same week as Titans and was also suffering from declining ratings, moved into the vacant Wednesday slot. While Ed saw ratings improvement, Titans attracted only 6.6 million viewers for its Monday debut, and was effectively canceled the next day with the announcement that NBC would not be ordering additional episodes. Though the remaining four produced episodes were expected to be aired, only two were broadcast in the United States, the last on December 18, 2000.

== Reception ==
John Kiesewetter of The Cincinnati Enquirer called the series "a mindless soap about filthy-rich, amoral people" but added, "As much as I wanted to hate Titans, I couldn't stop watching. Perhaps Mr. Spelling and Mr. Vincent have reinvented Dynasty, creating a Young and the Shirtless for the new millennium." David Zurawik of The Baltimore Sun called the acting "stunningly bad", citing Principal as "the one saving grace on the show". Phil Gallo of Variety singled out Bleeth as "eminently watchable". Despite the show's low ratings, Entertainment Weekly's Kristen Baldwin called its cancellation "a mistake", suggesting that viewership would have grown over time. Media ad buying executive Bob Flood admitted to Variety after the show's cancellation, "We thought Titans would be better than it turned out to be."
