= Blush: The Search for the Next Great Makeup Artist =

2008 American reality television series

- Genre: Reality
- Created by: Lori Aronsohn; Stacy Cox; Catherine Scheinman
- Presented by: Vanessa Marcil
- Theme music composer: Jeff Lippencott; Mark T. Williams
- Country of origin: United States
- Original language: English
- No. of seasons: 1
- No. of episodes: 6

Production
- Executive producers: Chris Dorne; Laura Fuest; Scott Kramer; Rob Lee; Jo Sharon; Brian Terkelsen
- Producers: Jean Arthur; Angela Chiu; Katie Krim; Davis Mikaels; Shaun Polakow; Margit Ritz
- Running time: 60 minutes

Original release
- Network: Lifetime
- Release: November 11 – December 16, 2008

Blush: The Search For the Next Great Makeup Artist is an American reality television series that aired on Lifetime from November 11 to December 16, 2008. It is hosted by actress Vanessa Marcil.

== Synopsis ==
Nine aspiring makeup artists tried to outdo one another for a one-year contract as a professional with Max Factor, $100,000 in cash, and a chance to show off their skills in a major glossy magazine cover shoot. The series premiered on November 11, 2008 and continued to air Tuesdays at 10:00 PM.

== Mentors and judges ==
- Charlie Green - professional makeup artist
- Hal Rubenstein - fashion director of InStyle magazine
- Joanna Schlip - professional makeup artist
- Dannii Minogue - Australian international singer - guest judge

== Contestants ==
=== Winner ===
Nolan Makaawaawa

=== Eliminated ===
- Maxi (eliminated Episode 6)
- Todd Homme (eliminated Episode 6)
- Farah Carter (eliminated Episode 5)
- Maura "Mo" Lewit (eliminated Episode 4)
- Myke Michaels (eliminated Episode 3)
- Sharzad Kiadeh (eliminated Episode 3)
- Rainell Chivonne (eliminated Episode 2)
- Jessica Millington (eliminated Episode 1)

=== Homme's death ===
On December 13, 2008, contestant Todd Homme was found dead in his home in New York City. Toxicology reports came back negative and cause of death was undetermined. He was twenty-three years old.

== Elimination Chart ==
| Artists | 1 | 2 | 3 | 4 | 5 | 6 |
| Nolan | BTM 3 | IN | IN | WIN | BTM 2* | WIN |
| Maxi | IN | BTM 3 | BTM 3 | IN | WIN | 2ND |
| Todd | WIN | IN | WIN | IN | IN | OUT |
| Farah | BTM 2 | WIN | IN | BTM 2 | OUT | |
| Mo | IN | IN | BTM2 | OUT | | |
| Myke | IN | IN | OUT | | | |
| Sharzad | IN | BTM 2 | OUT* | | | |
| Rainell | IN | OUT | | | | |
| Jessica | OUT | | | | | |

Green indicates the artist won the competition.
Pink indicates the artist was the runner-up.
Blue indicates the artist won the Max challenge and received immunity from elimination.
Purple indicates the artist won the elimination challenge and was safe at elimination.
White indicates the artist was safe at elimination.
Yellow indicates the artist was in the bottom three, but declared safe at elimination.
Orange indicates the artist was in the bottom two, but declared safe at elimination.
Red indicates the artist was eliminated.

- Sharzad was eliminated at an impromptu elimination challenge in place of the Max challenge.
- Nolan won the Max challenge in week 5, but did not receive immunity and was in the bottom 2 at elimination.
