= General Hospital's 50th anniversary =

- Official logo of General Hospital's 50th Anniversary.
- Date: April 1, 2013

General Hospital's 50th anniversary on April 1, 2013, was a milestone for the American soap opera series and has been commemorated with several events in the media and storylines on the show. Declining ratings and the cancellation of other soap operas in the late 2000s and early 2010s prompted concern that the show would not reach the milestone until new management led to a turn-around. Other events were organized to commemorate the occasion, with media promoting the milestone and commemorative memorabilia being released by ABC.

Begun in 1963, General Hospital eventually became the top daytime soap opera before a decline in the late 1970s, which was followed by a resurgence that peaked in the early 1980s. In honor of the anniversary, the producers reintroduced previous major characters and created storylines reminiscent of notable arcs of the past with the focus of the anniversary week on the show being the return of the popular Nurses' Ball event. Cast members also made appearances on several programs and at various media events to mark the anniversary. The Nurses' Ball is always a fan favorite episode to watch with many of the cast getting to show off talents other than acting.

== Background ==
General Hospital is the third longest-running soap opera in history and the longest-running American soap still in production. Started on April 1, 1963, the show became the highest rated show on daytime television within a decade, eclipsing previous leader As the World Turns. In 1977 General Hospital started to suffer a major drop in ratings and was at risk of being cancelled when Gloria Monty was hired on as executive producer. Monty refocused the series on younger characters and the show became the most successful daytime soap on television, with the 1981 episode featuring the wedding between characters Luke and Laura garnering 30 million views, setting a record as the most widely watched episode of daytime television in history.

When the show began focusing heavily on mob storylines in the 2000s, ratings saw a heavy decline. The show was one of several daytime dramas that was at risk of cancellation in the wake of falling ratings in the late 2000s and early 2010s with long-running soaps As the World Turns and Guiding Light being pulled off the air. Two soaps that aired alongside General Hospital on the ABC network, All My Children and One Life to Live, were also cancelled in September 2011 and January 2012 respectively. Members of the General Hospital cast began to believe that the soap would not be able to reach its 50th anniversary as ABC Daytime started prioritizing reality programming.

Frank Valentini, who was executive producer of One Life to Live, took over as executive producer of General Hospital after One Life to Live's cancellation. He was joined by One Life to Live writer Ron Carlivati and are together credited with revitalizing the series. The show began bringing in a new cast to put an emphasis on younger characters and moved away from the show's mob storylines. It has subsequently seen its best ratings in five years with an average of 3 million viewers, the biggest increase being amongst the 18-34 female demographic.

== Storylines ==
To honor the anniversary, several storylines were introduced that harkened back to historic periods in the series. Valentini described the plans for the anniversary storylines as being "not only to celebrate what's happening now, the resurgence of 'General Hospital' and a spike in its ratings in the past year, but what it means in terms of the history of the show." He stated that organizing the celebration was difficult due to the festivities going on both on and off-camera. Anthony Geary, who portrayed Luke Spencer, stated that the anniversary could have passed with minimal fanfare but that Valentini and head writer Carlivati were "determined to make it something special for the audience."

Several characters returned to the show in preparation for or to commemorate the anniversary including Audrey Hardy, who first appeared six months into the series. Audrey, portrayed by Rachel Ames, appears in the official anniversary episode, which aired a day after the anniversary due to scheduling changes prompted by the naming of Pope Francis. In the episode, Chris Robinson, Stuart Damon, and Natalia Livingston also returned in the roles of Rick Webber, Alan Quartermaine, and Emily Quartermaine respectively, whose deceased characters appeared as ghosts to the living character Monica Quartermaine, portrayed by Leslie Charleson. Genie Francis returned in her role as Laura Spencer in the lead-up to the anniversary and together with Geary as Luke became part of a storyline involving Helena Cassadine that Geary described as reminiscent of the Luke and Laura storylines created by Monty during the 1980s.

Another storyline element that was revived was the Nurses' Ball, which serves as the focus of the anniversary week programming. The fictional charity event to promote HIV/AIDS awareness was popular with viewers of the series since it began in 1994 and until it ended in 2001. Valentini revived the event on the show partially out of a desire to mark the anniversary. Lucy Coe, portrayed by Lynn Herring, also recently returned to the series and the character continued in her capacity as the master of ceremonies for the Ball. Musician Rick Springfield reprised his role as Noah Drake to do a performance during the Ball and Richard Simmons, who had been a recurring presence on the show in the 1980s (portraying himself), returned as a choreographer for the ball. Regular character Sam Morgan, portrayed by Kelly Monaco, performed a dance number during the special with a character portrayed by Maksim Chmerkovskiy of Dancing with the Stars. Originally, Valentini wanted to have Maksim's brother Val Chmerkovskiy appear on General Hospital to perform the number since he was Monaco's partner during her stint on Dancing with the Stars, but his schedule would not permit it.

For the first time the fictional charity gala was linked to a real non-profit devoted to HIV/AIDS research, amfAR, The Foundation for AIDS Research, as part of a partnership between the organization and ABC. Valentini stated with regards to the partnership that "by linking the ball to amfAR we partner in their efforts to raise awareness beyond the town of Port Charles."

== Other commemorations ==
TV Guide featured an advertisement for the anniversary on the back cover of its 60th anniversary issue consisting of an image collage depicting Luke and Laura from their 1981 wedding.

In addition to storylines on the show, ABC released limited-edition commemorative prints depicting various iconic scenes from the series including a group photo of present and past cast members as well as individual character prints. Only 1,963 prints of the cast photo have been made, signifying the year General Hospital premiered. Members of the cast, Valentini, and Carlivati, rung the opening bell for the New York Stock Exchange on April 1 to celebrate the anniversary. Finola Hughes and Jason Thompson, who portray Anna Devane and Patrick Drake respectively, made an appearance on the April 1 and April 2 airings of Who Wants to Be a Millionaire? where they performed a mock soap opera scene with host Meredith Vieira. Together they competed for money that would be donated to The Art of Elysium, a non-profit that encourages people in the entertainment industry to work with children suffering from serious illnesses, and managed to win $500,000.

Katie Couric had a "Countdown to the General Hospital 50th Anniversary Extravaganza" on her daytime talk show Katie, releasing exclusive interviews with cast, which culminated in an April 4 program of the show focused on the soap opera. Couric further anchored an April 6 20/20 behind-the-scenes special for the anniversary, "General Hospital - The Real Soap Dish", discussing the impact the show has had on popular culture and how some of its storylines have delved into societal topics.

For a February collector's edition issue, People magazine ran a special cover honoring the 50th anniversary. TV Guide, itself celebrating its 60th anniversary with a special edition issue, had an in-depth four-page feature about General Hospital's anniversary and a full-page advertisement for the event on its back cover. The feature reflected on the show's troubled state a year before the anniversary, its resurgence, and past revivals. For the back cover, the magazine depicted an image from the 1981 wedding of Luke and Laura formed by a collage of images from the show. Both the feature and back cover ad were well received by soap opera commentators.

SOAPnet aired a 50-hour marathon the weekend before the anniversary with an encore of the marathon airing the following weekend. The marathon began with the first episode of the series and some of the most noteworthy moments in the story over every decade, such as the wedding of Luke and Laura, the Ice Princess storyline, and the death of Stone Cates from HIV/AIDS.

A panel called "General Hospital: Celebrating 50 Years and Looking Forward", moderated by William Keck of TV Guide, was organized by the Paley Center for Media for April 12 to commemorate the anniversary. The panel consisted of several major cast members, along with producer Valentini and head writer Ron Carlivati. During the panel, audience members asked the panelists questions about the show and the soap opera genre. Panelists reflected on the show's history, discussed their roles in the anniversary storylines, and remembered deceased cast members, such as John Ingle who played Edward Quartermaine until his death in 2012, and John Beradino who played Steve Hardy.
