= Vanessa Marcil =

American actress (born 1968)

- Born: Vanessa Sally Ortiz; October 15, 1968 (age 58); Indio, California, U.S.
- Other name: Vanessa Marcil Giovinazzo
- Occupation: Actress
- Years active: 1992–2019
- Spouses: Corey Feldman (m. 1989; div. 1993) Carmine Giovinazzo (m. 2010; div. 2013)
- Partners: Brian Austin Green (1999–2003); MC Martin (2015–present; engaged)
- Children: 1

Vanessa Marcil (/mɑːrˈsɛl/ mar-SEL; born Vanessa Sally Ortiz; October 15, 1968) is an American actress. She is best known for her television roles as Brenda Barrett on General Hospital, Gina Kincaid on Beverly Hills, 90210, and Sam Marquez on Las Vegas.

== Early life ==
Vanessa Marcil was born on October 15, 1968 in Indio, California to Patricia Marcil, a herbalist, and Pete Ortiz, a contractor and self-made millionaire. Marcil's mother is an American of French and Italian ancestry and her father is Mexican. She is the youngest of four children.

== Career ==
Marcil acted in a number of theatre productions before landing the role of Brenda Barrett on the soap opera, General Hospital, in 1992. She garnered three Daytime Emmy Award nominations (in 1997, 1998, and 2003) for her portrayal, and she won in 2003 as Outstanding Supporting Actress. In February 1998, she was named Outstanding Lead Actress at the Soap Opera Digest Awards.

On June 14, 1993, she appeared in the Prince music video "Poorgoo," which was officially released in very limited numbers. In 1994, she was cast in the Prince music video "The Most Beautiful Girl in the World", and she also made People's 50 Most Beautiful list the next year. She made her feature-film debut in the film, The Rock (1996), in which she appeared opposite Nicolas Cage, Sean Connery, and Ed Harris.

In 1998, after six years on General Hospital, she left the show to star in the made-for-television movie, To Love, Honor and Deceive and had a recurring guest role on the police drama High Incident, which was produced by Steven Spielberg. In November 1998, Marcil joined the Beverly Hills, 90210 cast as Gina Kincaid and remained with the show for one-and-a-half seasons. In 1999, she starred in two independent films: Nice Guys Sleep Alone, with Sean O'Bryan, and This Space Between Us, with Jeremy Sisto.

In 2001, she was initially cast to join NYPD Blue's ninth season as a new series regular, Detective Carmen Olivera. However, after her first appearance in "Johnny Got His Gold,” the show decided to redo the role and replaced Marcil with Jacqueline Obradors, as Detective Rita Ortiz. Marcil made one more cameo appearance, as Detective Olivera, in the 11th-season episode, "Shear Stupidity.”

From 2002 to 2003, she returned to General Hospital, as Brenda Barrett, garnering her a Daytime Emmy Award for Outstanding Supporting Actress in 2003. Vanessa later joined the cast of the NBC drama Las Vegas as Sam Marquez, a casino host, where she remained on the show for five seasons until 2008. That same year, she became the host of Lifetime's reality show Blush: The Search for the Next Great Makeup Artist, as well as making a three-episode guest appearance on the NBC show Lipstick Jungle.

In 2009, she starred in the Hallmark Channel movie The Nanny Express and in the Lifetime movie, One Hot Summer. In 2010, she was in the web series The Bannen Way, and in August 2010, after a seven-year absence, she made her return to General Hospital, remaining on the show for a year before her departure from the daytime series in July 2011. Marcil did reprise her role by making a guest appearance in April 2013, however, to commemorate the show's 50th anniversary.

In 2014, she starred in the Hallmark channel movie, Stranded in Paradise, and in 2015, she joined the cast of the Pop reality series, Queens of Drama, about the lives of former soap-opera actresses attempting to pitch a pilot for a television network.

In 2016, she starred in her latest Hallmark channel movie, The Convenient Groom.

In 2019, Marcil starred in the Lifetime film My Stepfather's Secret.

Instead of acting full-time, Marcil focuses her energy on being a single-mother advocate, animal rescue, and engaging directly with her loyal fan base through social media and special virtual fan events, such as fundraisers for food banks. Although she has not taken on a major television role in several years, she occasionally resurfaces for special appearances or fan events tied to General Hospital—the daytime soap that launched her career—or for charitable causes.

== Personal life ==
Marcil was married to actor Corey Feldman from 1989 to 1993.

In 1999, Marcil started dating her Beverly Hills, 90210 castmate, Brian Austin Green, whom she met on set. The two became engaged in July 2001 and had a son named Kassius Lijah Marcil-Green born in 2002. They planned to wed that year, but ended their relationship in 2003.

Marcil converted to Judaism in 2008 which also was one of the reasons why she removed her ankle and lower back tattoos.

On July 11, 2010, Marcil married actor Carmine Giovinazzo in a private ceremony in New York City. In June 2011, the couple announced they were expecting their first child together; however, Marcil suffered a miscarriage, her second that year. Marcil filed for divorce in August 2012 on the basis of irreconcilable differences. The divorce was finalized in March 2013.

In April 2015, Marcil revealed on social media that she was engaged to a California Deputy Sheriff, MC Martin. On November 13, 2017, Marcil announced she was pregnant again. Marcil's father Pete died on September 14, 2017.

On January 9, 2018, Marcil revealed that she was expecting a daughter, but on January 27, released a statement on Instagram stating she had miscarried for the seventh time.

== Filmography ==
=== Film ===
Year	Title	Role	Notes
1996	The Rock	Carla Pestalozzi	
1997	976-WISH	Danielle	Short film
1999	Nice Guys Sleep Alone	Erin	
2000	This Space Between Us	Maggie Harty	
2002	Storm Watch	Tess Woodward	Alternative titles: Virtual Storm, Code Hunter

=== Television ===
Year	Title	Role	Notes
1992–1998; 2002–2003; 2010–2011; 2013	General Hospital	Brenda Barrett	Main role (1992–1998; 2002–2003 & 2010–2011); guest role (2013)
1996	To Love, Honor and Deceive	Sydney Carpenter	Television film; aka The Protected Wife
1997	High Incident	Kerry Andrews	Episodes: "Hot Wire", "Remote Control"
1998–2000	Beverly Hills, 90210	Gina Kincaid	Main role
2001	Spin City	Crazy Kara	Episode: "A Shot in the Dark: Part 2"
2001, 2003	NYPD Blue	Detective Maria Olivera	Episodes: "Johnny Got His Gold", "Shear Stupidity"
2003–2008	Las Vegas	Sam Marquez	Main role
2004–2005	Crossing Jordan	Sam Marquez	2 episodes
2008	Lipstick Jungle	Josie Scotto	3 episodes
2008	The Nanny Express	Kate Hewitt	Television film
2009	Without a Trace	Kim Marcus	3 episodes
2009	One Hot Summer	Margarita Silva Santos	Television film
2010	The Bannen Way	Madison	Webseries
2012	Hawaii Five-0	Dr. Olivia Victor	Episode: "Wahine'inoloa"
2014	Hell's Kitchen	Herself	Episode: "17 Chefs Compete"
2014	Stranded in Paradise	Tess Nelson	Television film
2016	The Convenient Groom	Dr. Kate Lawrence	Television film
2017	The Wrong Mother	Kaylene	Television film
2018	Bad Tutor	Kelly	Television film
2019	My Stepfather's Secret	Tina	Television film

== Awards and nominations ==
Year	Award	Category	Work	Result
1994	Soap Opera Digest Awards	Outstanding Female Newcomer	General Hospital	Nominated
1995	Soap Opera Digest Awards	Hottest Soap Couple (shared with Maurice Benard)	General Hospital	Nominated
1997	Daytime Emmy Award	Outstanding Supporting Actress in a Drama Series	General Hospital	Nominated
1997	Soap Opera Digest Awards	Hottest Female Star	General Hospital	Won
1998	Soap Opera Digest Awards	Outstanding Lead Actress	General Hospital	Won
1998	Daytime Emmy Award	Outstanding Supporting Actress in a Drama Series	General Hospital	Nominated
2003	Soap Opera Digest Awards	Favorite Return	General Hospital	Won
2003	Daytime Emmy Award	Outstanding Supporting Actress in a Drama Series	General Hospital	Won
