= Danielle Spencer (The Bold and the Beautiful) =

- The Bold and the Beautiful character
- Portrayed by: Crystal Chappell
- Duration: 2012–13
- First appearance: May 17, 2012
- Last appearance: October 14, 2013
- Introduced by: Bradley Bell
In-universe information
- Occupation: Journalist
- Wife: Karen Spencer
- Adoptive daughters: Caroline Spencer
- Grandsons: Douglas Forrester

Danielle "Dani" Spencer is a fictional character from the CBS American soap opera, The Bold and the Beautiful, played by Crystal Chappell. She made her first appearance on May 17, 2012. Danielle was introduced as the partner of established character Karen Spencer (Joanna Johnson) and the other mother of Caroline Spencer (Linsey Godfrey) in the soap's first gay storyline. Executive producer Bradley Bell decided to introduce the character in order to explore attitudes towards same-sex marriage. Danielle's initial storyline revolved around her move to Los Angeles and being revealed as Karen's wife, which involves Karen coming out to her family. During the storyline, Johnson herself came out publicly. Chappell had previously portrayed LGBTQ+ women in two other soap operas and Bell wanted her to play Danielle. Danielle's introduction received good reviews, but Danielle and Karen's lack of storyline and development was criticised.

== Casting ==
In April 2012, it was announced that Crystal Chappell – who had not appeared on daytime television since being let go from another soap opera, Days of Our Lives, in 2011 – had been cast as Danielle Spencer for The Bold and the Beautiful's first same-sex storyline. Danielle was introduced as the other mother of newcomer Caroline Spencer (Linsey Godfrey), who had been introduced the previous month as the daughter of Karen Spencer (Joanna Johnson). At the time of the announcement, it was unknown whether Johnson would be returning as Karen. Chappell had previously portrayed LGBT+ women in soap operas Venice: The Series and Guiding Light, the latter of which she had portrayed Olivia Spencer, who was part of one of the soap's most popular couples, "Otalia", in a highly promoted storyline which "paved the way for lesbian relationships on the soaps". The soap's executive producer, Bradley Bell, called Chappell about the role and she was interested. Speaking about the casting, Bell revealed that Chappell was at the "top" of his list, explaining that "[w]hen it came to casting Karen's partner, I thought immediately of Crystal Chappell...She's a great actress and such a good kisser".

Chappell debuted as Danielle on the episode that originally aired on May 17 of that year, the day after Johnson reappeared as Karen. Chappell continued making appearances as Danielle in 2012 and later reappeared on January 4, 2013, along with Johnson. Chappell made an additional appearance as Danielle on October 14, 2013.

== Creation and development ==
"Karen and Danielle are a modern married couple, so why wouldn't they kiss? We plan to discuss the real issues, present some prejudices, and try to get people to move forward in their thinking, instead of backward. I want to do this story because I listen to all the political debates on the subject of same-sex marriage and can't believe I share the same country with people who think so differently about human rights. I want to put my hat in the ring and, hopefully, help change some thoughts and opinions on the issue."

— Bradley Bell on presenting Danielle and Karen's relationship (2012)

Danielle and Karen Spencer (Joanna Johnson) are the first lesbian characters to appear on The Bold and the Beautiful. Speaking about the character's creation and the decision to have Karen come out as a lesbian, Bell explained, "Once we decided to bring Karen's daughter, Caroline, onto the show, the question naturally arose, "Who is the father? Why doesn't she seem to have one?" I started thinking about all the story possibilities and decided, "Why not give her two mothers?" Everyone on the show has a mother and father and that's getting a little dull." Bell then asked Johnson whether she would be okay with that storyline, who was "very excited". Bell was determined to not make the same mistakes that happened in Chappell's lesbian pairing on Guiding Light, where the couple did not kiss. Johnson revealed that she was initially surprised when Bell asked her, but they then laughed and she joked to him, "Just make sure you get me a hot wife", which, according to her, "he did".

Danielle is the wife of Karen and they are the mothers of Caroline Spencer (Linsey Godfrey), who was named after Karen's twin sister, Caroline Spencer Forrester (Johnson). The couple move to Los Angeles and Danielle interviews for a job for Karen's half-brother, Bill Spencer Jr. (Don Diamont). Bill is unaware that Danielle is married to his sister and believes that she is flirting with him. Bradley Bell, the executive producer of The Bold and the Beautiful, used Bill's reaction to finding out that Danielle and Karen a couple as a way to explore attitudes toward same-sex marriage. It is revealed that Karen and Bill Jr.'s father, Bill (Jim Storm), knew about Danielle but did not allow Karen to be open about her relationship as he worried about the effect it could have on their company, Spencer Publications. Speaking about why Karen has been hiding her sexuality and relationship with Danielle from her family, Bell explained, "This sort of thing is a big issue for the Spencer men, and Karen just didn't want any negativity from her brother. We'll find out that she got enough of that from her father, Bill Spencer Sr., who knew about her lifestyle and was very against her saying anything about it. He forbade her to bring it into her business life at Spencer Publications, the company that bore his fine name". Bell teased that Karen would handle Bill Jr. "in her own way", adding that "The reveal will be fun and it will be serious. Karen's [sexuality] is obvious to everyone but Bill. He's never been particularly close to his sister or had much interest in her. He just doesn't understand why she can't seem to get a man."

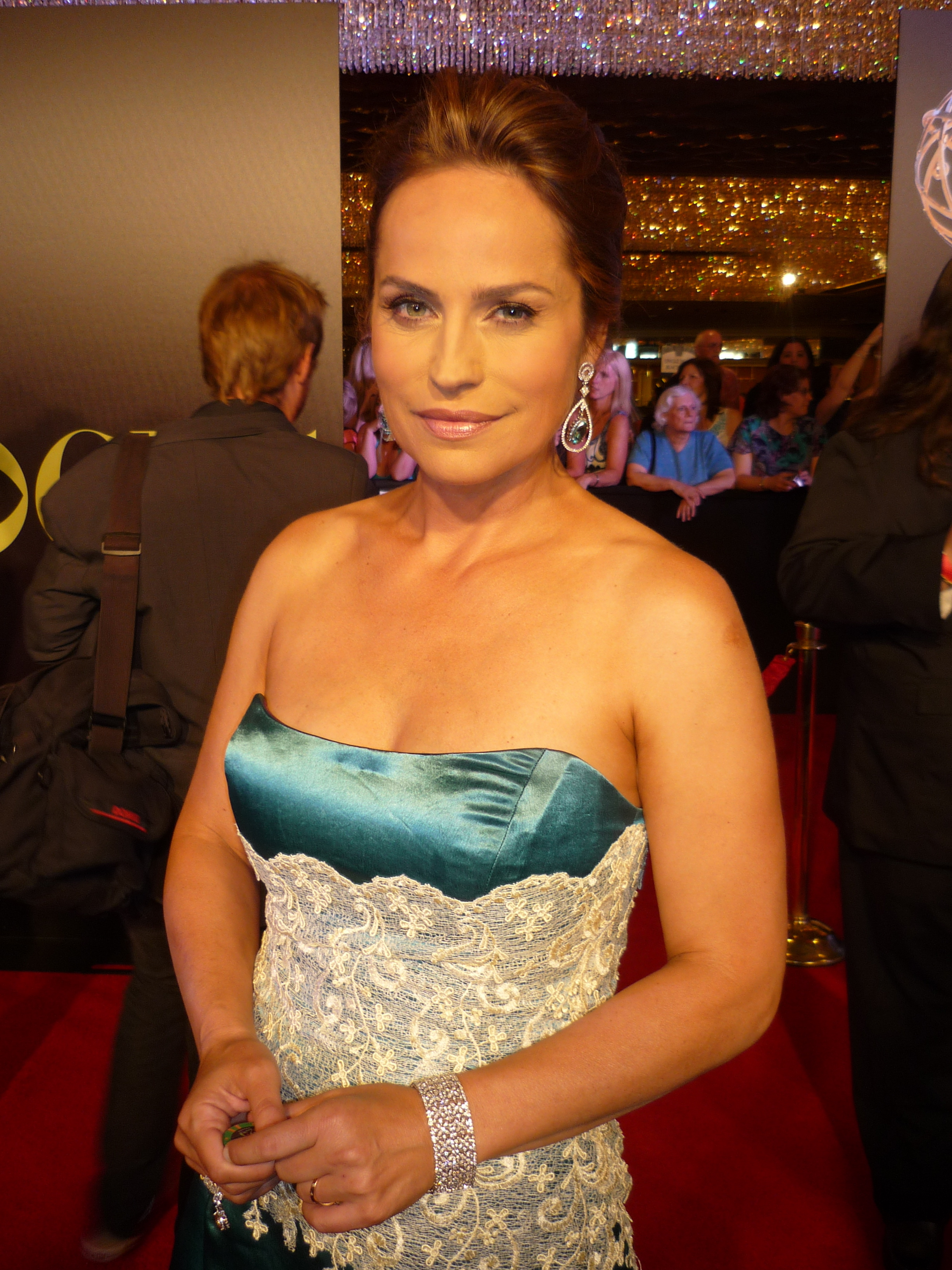
Bradley Bell wanted Crystal Chappell (pictured) to portray Danielle.

Karen initially introduces Danielle as her friend. Surely after Danielle's debut, "key scenes" introducing the couple occur when Caroline wants her friend, Thomas Forrester (Adam Gregory), to meet her parents, with Thomas looking forward to meeting Caroline's father. Karen's discomfort about her life being "exposed" is highlighted after some "banter", but Karen eventually tells Thomas that she is Danielle's partner and they are Caroline's parents. There are later some "blistery" moments when Bill Jr. makes "'as-expected' smarmy" comments when he sees pictures of Danielle and Karen on the fireplace mantel, which "justifies" Karen's fears that Bill Jr. can never know that she is gay and with Danielle. However, following Caroline and Thomas' encouragement, Karen tells Bill, who is surprisingly "very understanding" and welcomes Danielle into the Spencer family.

As viewers and characters were finding out that Karen is gay and with Danielle, Johnson herself publicly came out as gay, revealing that she had kept her sexual identity a secret whilst working in Daytime as she believed that she would no longer be employed or be "believable" in romance stories. Johnson's real life was used as inspiration for Karen and Danielle's storyline. Johnson revealed, "After I started playing Karen [in 1991], I remember doing a fantasy scene that showed what life would have been like if Caroline had not died of cancer. She was married to Ridge and had two kids and a wonderful life. When we finished shooting, I ran to my dressing room and just cried and cried because I knew I was never going to have that kind of life. And now on B&B we're finding out that Karen is married to this great lady Dani and together they have raised her daughter Caroline. So times have certainly changed. I guess that's why I'm ready to open up. It feels weird and wrong to play this revelation about Karen's life and not talk about my own." Speaking about working with Chappell, Johnson joked that, despite being straight, Chappell was "more comfortable playing gay" than Johnson was. Johnson revealed that "When we first met up at the show we had to shoot some photos — vacation-type snapshots of Karen and Dani to put on the mantel — and I felt kind of nervous and awkward. I think Crystal thought I was a little crazy but when I explained that I hadn't yet come out publicly, she got it and has been very lovely and supportive."

In July 2012, it was reported that the "broader story" for Danielle and Karen would be "refocused" due to Johnson being unavailable to film more episodes for The Bold and the Beautiful as she was busy with other projects. However, it was confirmed that Chappell would remain as Danielle, with a The Bold and the Beautiful spokesperson saying that viewers "can look forward to continue seeing more of Caroline's other mom, Dani". In 2013, Danielle and Karen rejoice after successfully help Bill Jr's wife, Katie Logan (Heather Tom), seize full control of Spencer Publications.

== Storylines ==
Danielle is a journalist who met Karen Spencer (Joanna Johnson at a party in New York. They begin a romance, which is disapproved of by Karen's father, Bill (Jim Storm), who makes her keep it a secret as he does not want it to the damage the company, Spencer Publications. Karen and Danielle eventually marry and years later, they move to Los Angeles with their daughter, Caroline. Danielle interviews for a job for Karen's half-brother, Bill Spencer Jr. (Don Diamont). Karen is determined to not reveal her sexuality and tells people that Danielle is her friend and roommate. After some persuading, Danielle eventually tells Caroline's friend, Thomas Forrester (Adam Gregory), that Danielle is her partner and the other mother of Caroline. Thomas is supportive and apologises for asking about Caroline's father, but Danielle and Karen are happy that he wants to find out more about her daughter. Danielle and Karen become frustrated that Bill has not told Danielle the outcome of her job application. Bill's wife, Katie Logan (Heather Tom), later walks in on Karen and Spencer and tells them that she relieved that she can stop pretending that they are not a couple as she had been suspecting that they were. She encourages them to tell Bill Jr., but they are hesitant as they are worried that he will use it against her professionally. Danielle snaps at Katie when she questions why Karen allowed Bill Sr. to hide Danielle's existence. Danielle and Karen explain that Bill Sr. threatened to cut Karen off financially and that the decision almost broke their relationship. Danielle tells Karen that she believes that she made the right decision as the money gave Caroline a good life and great opportunities. With encouragement, Karen comes out to Bill Jr., who believes that Danielle has been flirting with him. To Karen's surprise, Bill is supportive and welcomes Danielle to the family. Danielle and Karen confront Bill after finding out that he pushed Caroline off a balcony, with Danielle revealing that she has seen Bill rely on alcohol on a number of occasions. Years later, Caroline goes to stay with Danielle and Karen and is hit by a car, so her two mothers look after her.

== Reception ==
Ryan White-Nobles from TV Source magazine had mixed opinions about Chappell's casting, writing, "What? This is so random even for The Bold and the Beautiful. Smart move on B&B's part to hire Chappell but isn't this a little bit of typecasting? Kudos to the show for going forward with a same-sex storyline, especially after changing their minds about making Thomas gay. Chappell is a phenomenal actress with a major fanbase and would be a welcome addition to any soap opera. Kind of looking forward to this…a lot." Gwen Reyes from Fort Worth Star-Telegram believed that the storyline would be "controversial" and wondered how well the character would be accepted by fans, but added that she and her colleagues were excited to see Chappell in the "exciting new role". Reyes added that "a storyline dedicated entirely to the creation and development of a lesbian couple is a first time for the ratings-rich series". Reyes also believed that Danielle should "know better than to try to control her heart".

Michael Fairman from Michael Fairman TV believed that Bell was trying to show "a well-rounded relationship between" Danielle and Karen, and speculated that Bill Jr. may not be happy with the reveal. Speaking about Danielle's debut, Fairman wrote that "soap fans were in for a treat with the return" of Chappell. When it was reported in July 2012 that Johnson would be not able to film more episodes as Karen, Fairman questioned whether the soap should recast Karen, give Danielle a new female love interest or "give the mighty Chappell a big story of her own". Jack Phillips from The List noted that Karen's coming out and the introduction of Danielle was one of Karen's most important storylines as it was the first time that a main character on the soap had identified as being part of the LGBTQ+ community, which Phillips said demonstrated "the show's aim to reflect a modern, progressive society". Phillips believed that Danielle and Karen's romance was an "important love story", and that Bill being understanding of the romance marked "a significant evolution in his character".

Danielle and Karen's relationship storyline resulted in The Bold and the Beautiful being nominated for "Outstanding Daily Drama" at the 2013 24th GLAAD Media Awards. Charlie Mason and Dustin Cushman from Soaps She Knows put Karen and Danielle on their list of Daytime's Groundbreaking LGBTQ+ Characters and Couples but were disappointed with their lack of development, writing that "Unfortunately, an introduction to the couple was about all we got." In 2023, Cushman criticised The Bold and the Beautiful for its lack of LGBTQ+ representation – grading it lower than the other daytime soap operas – and commented on how the soap's only two gay characters, Danielle and Karen, "never really had a storyline of their own (not after Bill's sister was revealed to be a lesbian), haven't been seen in over a decade and may never appear again, considering that Caroline is dead".

Trish Bendix from AfterEllen branded the storyline "The gay and the closeted", and wrote that due to hiding her sexuality and relationship, Karen missed the chance of laughing in Bill's "ignorant and conceited face" when he believed that Danielle was flirting with him, adding that Karen "almost" had it all. Bendix' colleague, Heather Hogan, wrote that she was "thankful" that Danielle was being introduced, and joked that she was praying to Sappho that "Danielle and Karen avoid the Bubonic Plague, falling meteors, speeding bullets, and every other daytime lesbian death-trap!" Jamey Giddens from Daytime Confidential called Danielle and Karen Katie's "Sapphic Sisters-in-law" and wrote that "Grrl power is in full effect today" after the three characters had successfully seized control of Spencer Publications.
