= Bill Spencer Jr. =

- The Bold and the Beautiful character
- Portrayed by: Don Diamont
- Duration: 2009–present
- First appearance: May 12, 2009
- Created by: Bradley Bell; Kay Alden
- Book appearances: Forbidden Affair (2013); Collision Course (2013)
- Crossover appearances: The Young and the Restless
In-universe information
- Other names: William Spencer Jr. (Silver) Dollar Bill
- Occupation: CEO of Spencer Publications; 50% Owner of Spencer Publications; Owner of a hotel in Las Vegas, Nevada
- Family: Spencer
- Father: Bill Spencer
- Half-sisters: Caroline Spencer Forrester; Karen Spencer
- Wife: Katie Logan (2009–2014, 2015–2016, 2025–present); Brooke Logan (2017–2018)
- Sons: Wyatt Spencer; Liam Spencer; Will Spencer
- Granddaughters: Kelly Spencer; Beth Spencer
- Nieces: Caroline Spencer

Bill Spencer Jr. is a fictional character from the American CBS soap opera The Bold and the Beautiful. He is portrayed by Don Diamont. Bill Spencer Jr. is the previously unknown illegitimate son of media mogul, Bill Spencer (Jim Storm), a character that appeared from the series premiere until 1994 and then only sporadically afterwards. He is also the half-brother of Karen Spencer and the late Caroline Forrester (both played by Joanna Johnson). He was born in early March 1963.

== Creation ==
Don Diamont briefly appeared on The Bold and the Beautiful's in 1993 as Brad Carlton, who crossed over from The Young and the Restless. When Diamont was fired from The Young and the Restless in 2009, The Bold and the Beautiful's executive producer and head writer, Bradley Bell, hired Diamont to play the younger Bill Spencer, a character Bell created specifically for the actor. "It's funny how one door closes and another opens," Diamont said. "I had a lot of emotion tied to Y&R. My entire adult life had been there, including so many relationships. Little did I know that such a great character and work situation was literally around the corner." Though never mentioned before in the series, he is the son of a character from The Bold and the Beautiful's early years, Bill Spencer, who ran Spencer Publications. With the departure of Bill from the series in 1994, that business was no longer featured in the sexy light of the other characters. "We're bringing another powerful presence to the show by getting Spencer Publications going again," Bell said. "We're going to show how fashion magazines influence the fashion world." Diamont described the new character he would portray as "uncensored" and "devilish". "Bill is a publishing bigwig, so he's very powerful, but he didn't grow up with a silver spoon," he said. "In fact, he was estranged from his father for a long time, but some years back, they developed a relationship. It wasn't exactly a cuddly one, but it was still a relationship, and they bonded over business." He was a contrast to Brad Carlton, the character he used to play on The Young and the Restless. "It's not like they're taking a facsimile of Brad and plugging him into this show," Diamont said. "This guy could not be a bigger departure from Brad. Bill dresses and thinks completely different. He's ruthless and twisted." Bill is a "Richard Branson-esque businessman" who speaks his mind no matter the consequence.

Diamont's character crossed over to The Young and the Restless on February 18, 2021.

== Storylines ==
After his father dies, Bill receives 50 percent ownership of Spencer Publications and is named co-CEO with his sister, Karen. He hires his father's close friend, Stephanie Forrester, to promote Jackie M Designs by writing a scandalous daily blog/webcast entitled The Logan Chronicles. It makes Spencer Publications a lot of money and gives Stephanie her revenge on her ex-husband, Eric, and his new wife, Donna Logan. Bill begins dating Katie Logan, but her sisters, Brooke and Donna, assume Bill is just using her and oppose their relationship. Bill and Katie marry at her childhood home with their families present.

When the Forresters are thirty minutes late in a loan payment, Bill pressures the banker to foreclose and the Forresters reluctantly sell to Bill and Forrester Creations becomes a subsidiary of Spencer Publications. Katie is suspicious but Bill says he is doing the best thing for the company. When moving into the Forrester beach house, that Bill secretly bought, Katie discovers Bill's true motivations when she finds a DVD, in which Bill Spencer, Sr. promises his son half of Spencer Publications on the condition that Bill use the company to avenge Stephanie, whom he reveals to be his true love, by crushing Eric and taking away his company. Bill names Katie CEO, much to the resentment of the Forresters. Bill and Katie both make it known that they are the ones in charge, which nearly causes Ridge and Eric to quit the company. Meanwhile, Ridge's daughter, Steffy, is attracted to Bill and makes several attempts to seduce him away from his wife. Steffy even finds a way to blackmail Bill into selling Forrester Creations back to her family by nearly seducing Bill and taking Katie's ring from the dresser in the bedroom. Bill agrees to sell Forrester Creations to Eric and Ridge but Steffy has the document state that the company will be sold to Eric, Ridge, Stephanie, and Taylor. Bill tells Katie he is selling Forrester Creations. Katie doesn't understand his motivation for selling it; but he gets the company back anyway.

Bill helps Donna win a percentage of the stock in the company as part of her divorce settlement with Eric and then buys it from her. Bill soon learns that he is the father of a former Spencer Publications employee named Liam Cooper, whose mother, Kelly Hopkins, Bill had dated in college. Both Katie and Hope Logan encourage Bill and Liam to get to know each other. Bill and Liam soon become close. The devious schemer and gold digger, Amber Moore, pretends to have sex with an unconscious Liam at a party and then claims to be pregnant with his child. Bill forces Amber to get a paternity test, which proves Liam is the father, Bill is furious and threatens revenge. Bill buys a beach house for Amber, but finds the perfect opportunity to be rid of her when she falls over a bannister. He does nothing as she hangs on for dear life, but Steffy arrives in time and saves her. Amber gives birth to a daughter and it is revealed that Marcus Forrester is the father not Liam.

Bill's marriage to Katie is further strained as she overhears him confiding in Steffy his intent to kill Amber. Katie learns of Bill's near affair and his plans to leave her for Steffy. The shock causes her to have a heart attack, which leads Bill to realize how much he cares about her. Bill then decides to stay with Katie and ends his relationship with Steffy. Liam stops by Steffy's condo to drop off the spare key that Bill had and finds Steffy unconscious and submerged in her bathtub. After regaining consciousness, Steffy tells him how grateful she is to him for saving her but uses the experience to further antagonize Hope. Liam becomes engaged to Hope and in an attempt to save his son's reputation as a potential lady's man he and Steffy plot together to destroy Liam and Hope's engagement. Bill also relates to his friend and right-hand man Justin Barber that he thinks Steffy is a much better woman for his son and he wants his son to marry Steffy. Bill sees Hope as a manipulative tease since she wants to wait until they're married before having sex. Bill wants his son with Steffy. Thanks to Steffy, Bill gets what he wants; Hope breaks off her engagement to Liam after seeing him & Steffy kissing, and he ends up proposing to Steffy, who happily accepts. Steffy's father, Ridge, punched Bill over his involvement with Steffy, so Bill went to Nick with an offer to buy 50% of Jackie M to crush Forrester. Nick was tempted, but Nick's mother, Jackie Marone, ultimately nixed the deal. Bill again deemed Hope unsuitable for Liam, so he teamed with Steffy to get rid of Hope. On Bill's orders, Steffy kissed Liam at Liam's bachelor party. Hope saw it and left her engagement ring on Liam's mantel. Liam offered the ring to Steffy, and Bill capitalized on it by sending Steffy and Liam to his cabin in Aspen. When Hope followed, Bill arranged a wedding for Steffy and Liam, which Hope was forced to watch while trapped in the Silver Queen gondola, courtesy of Bill. Bill encourages the relationship and even tells them to go out of town on a romantic getaway. Bill is further delighted and happy when he learns that on October 11, 2011 Liam and Steffy get married. Katie, however, doesn't support the marriage and is very suspicious of it because she believes that Steffy has other motives to marry Liam. Katie vows to get him and Hope back together, which she does when she finds out that Bill and Steffy conspired to keep Liam and Hope apart. She tells Liam everything, resulting in him blasting both his father and Steffy. Liam reunites with Hope despite Bill's objections. Bill vows to do whatever he can to keep his family together despite Liam's and Katie's anger and disappointment in him.

In 2012, Bill learns his sister Karen and niece Caroline, an aspiring fashion designer, are moving to Los Angeles. Bill continues to try to make sure that Liam doesn't end up with Hope. He is shocked to learn Katie is pregnant, and fearing for her health, demands she get an abortion, but she refuses. He eventually comes to accept the pregnancy upon realizing how much it means to Katie. Karen then tells Bill that she is gay, and that their father, Bill Spencer Sr. threatened to disown her if she came out publicly, for fear it would hurt Spencer Publications. Bill tells her that unlike their father, he loves and accepts her for who she is, which Karen greatly appreciates. In September, Katie gives birth to a son William Logan Spencer. Later, suffering from postpartum depression, Katie leaves Bill and their son, and starts pushing Bill towards her sister Brooke. Bill and Brooke become very close, kissing multiple times. When Katie eventually returns home with the help of Taylor Hayes, he and Brooke seem disappointed, when Katie asks why they seem mellow, they inform her that Stephanie Forrester had died just a few hours earlier. Bill also ends up having to face up to his part in Liam and Hope's breakup when Liam confronts him about his role in the whole sorted mess.

Despite his decision to be with Hope, Liam realizes that ending his marriage to Steffy may be harder than it seems. Despite trying to get an annulment, Steffy refuses to cave in, stating that she would rather get a divorce, resulting in Liam and Hope being forced to wait 6 months until they can get married. Steffy finally agrees to an annulment, but Liam ends up tearing up the annulment papers and passionately kisses Steffy unbenownced to Hope. The divorce happens, but Liam tells Steffy that he does not regret his marriage to her.

Despite Katie having come back, Bill can't seem to deny what he feels for Brooke, and they start spending more time together. Bill even encourages Brooke to relaunch her popular Brooke's Bedroom line, which Eric approves of. However, Katie catches them fooling around and becomes angry over what she assumes is her husband cheating on her with her sister. All the stress over Bill's closeness to Brooke takes its toll on Katie, and she winds up in the hospital after suffering a heart attack. Despite having had sex, Bill and Brooke decide to end their affair for Katie's sake, and Bill makes an effort to show Katie that he loves her and is committed to her.

Bill's half-sister, Karen Spencer, paid occasional visits from New York, but relocated to Los Angeles when her daughter, Caroline Spencer, took a job at Forrester. Bill raised an eyebrow when he met Danielle and assumed she was Karen's roommate. Fearful that Bill would be homophobic, Karen was adamant that Bill not find out Danielle was her spouse and that Caroline was their daughter, even as Karen arranged a job interview for Danielle at Spencer. Bill was intrigued by Danielle's international exploits as a freelance writer and thought that Danielle was coming on to him. But when Karen finally explained about her relationship with Danielle, Bill gave Karen his acceptance.

Bill Spencer got Hope's father Deacon out of prison to stop their wedding. Deacon was hesitant at first but later agreed. Bill then took Deacon and Alison to Italy to stop the wedding. Bill told Steffy (Liam's ex-wife) to stay in Italy knowing something might happen. When Deacon and Alison Montgomery were alone Deacon decided to ask Alison about Liam and Hope. Alison admitted she doesn't know Hope very well, but she sees she loves him as much as he loves her. Deacon went along with Bill's plan and Liam and Hope never got married.

Bill Spencer's niece Caroline Spencer just got jilted by her ex-boyfriend Rick Forrester because he engaged in a relationship with Maya whom he met at Dayzee's while helping out there. Bill has Alison and Justin dig up some dirt on Maya Avant. They've found that Maya is an ex-convict but was proven innocent. Maya was sent to jail because of Jesse Graves who committed an illegal crime with a gun. Maya also has a restraining order against him. Alison met up with Jesse Graves so he'll talk with Maya at the party and gave him a tall stack of cash, she told him half now and half later. Bill set Maya up at a party with Jesse Graves. Maya bumped into him and they had a chat. Alison showed up at the party as a dork in disguise with a camera to take pictures. Bill threatened Maya if she continued a relationship with Rick, she could go back to jail. Bill also slid the picture on his desk. Alison showed up at Maya's apartment with the photo's and made her end it with Rick. Maya ended their relationship but later told Rick everything and got back together. Rick threatened Bill that if he bullied Maya again, he would fire Caroline from Forrester Creations.

Alison had a drink with Bill at work and Bill insisted he'd drive himself home and ended up crashing his car directly into Brooke. Brooke brought Bill to her house to make sure he was okay, and when the police were on the street Brooke kept Bill there to avoid suspicion. Katie came over to Brooke's house worried, and was devastated when she found out Brooke and Bill crashed into each other. Katie went ballistic and gave her ring back to Bill and said Brooke and Bill should be together. Brooke and Bill gave into their passion and had sex. However Katie had another heart attack, Brooke then told Bill to go back to Katie and that their time together would be nothing more than a lovely memory. Brooke found out from Dr. Caspary she's pregnant with Bill's child. Brooke told her sister Donna but she kept it a secret. Then Brooke tried to seduce Eric and told him about the baby and asked if he would claim paternity. Eric declined saying he's in a relationship with Taylor (Stephanie's now deceased) but pressured Brooke into telling the truth. Brooke ran over to Bill and Katie's to tell them, but fainted and had a miscarriage, not telling them the truth. Brooke later tells Bill who had been concerned about her distant and distracted behavior. Bill then held Brooke and sheds tears for their lost child.

Taylor sneaks into Dr. Caspary's files and finds out Brooke was pregnant and had a miscarriage. At Brooke's birthday party (hosted by Katie in Katie and Bill's house) when Donna and Katie were admiring Brooke, Taylor stated that Brooke got pregnant with Bill Spencer's child, but miscarried. Katie repeatedly asked Brooke if it was true; however, Brooke couldn't answer because she swore she would never lie to her. Katie forced everyone out and was very angry with Bill and Brooke. Bill told Katie she was partially responsible because she was pushing them together but was sorry. He stated he wanted to make things right but Katie refused. Katie asked Bill if he loved Brooke and he refused to answer, consequently Katie and Bill filed for divorce. Katie asked for 1% of Spencer Publications, downgrading Bill to 49% and Karen already with 50%. Katie – with Karen's permission – fired Bill and Katie took his place.

While Hope and Liam were camping in Big Bear, Liam keeps thinking about Steffy and ends it with Hope leaving Big Bear. Hope took a picture of a guy Wyatt naked in the woods, Wyatt heard the snap and chased her. When she fell and was knocked out, Wyatt kissed her, and the two became friends. Hope noticed that Wyatt had the same sword necklace as Bill and Liam have. Wyatt stated that his mother's a jewelry designer and Hope decided that she wanted to meet her and ask. Hope did, and Quinn told her that it was one of a kind, and one of the first ones she ever made. Quinn also said Wyatt's father died when he was young but stated he was materialistic, self-centered, and a jerk. Hope later confided in her brother Rick about it, and believed that all the things that Quinn said about her son's father fit Bill Spencer perfectly. Hope later told Wyatt her suspicions about him possibly being Bill's son, making him Liam's half-brother – but Wyatt told her that that was impossible. Bill and Liam are at a well-known restaurant when Liam tells Bill he's engaged to Hope. Bill didn't support him because Hope's not outgoing enough to be a Spencer (in which Bill supports Liam's ex-wife Steffy instead). Hope admitted to Wyatt she and Bill aren't exactly fans of each other; however, Hope sets up Wyatt and Quinn to show up at the same restaurant and they immediately recognize each other. Liam noticed Bill staring and encouraged unsure Bill to go and ask and Bill did. Bill introduced himself and Quinn denied knowing him. Bill mentioned she made him very happy by making his pendant for him, Bill then mentioned her name "Quinn Fuller" – and she ran off scared. Wyatt went after her and asked if Bill Spencer was his real father and Quinn said yes. Wyatt was raging and Quinn said she lied to him that his father died because she was a teenager and once she was pregnant, Bill wanted nothing to do with either of them and handed her money for an abortion. Quinn didn't want to lose her child and had Wyatt without Bill knowing. Wyatt yelled at Bill for not wanting him and Quinn for not giving him the choice if he wanted his father in his life. Wyatt then drove off angrily. Liam then drove up to Bill and Quinn in his car and Bill hopped in and told Liam to follow the green car. Quinn then went back to the restaurant for her purse where Hope Logan was and Quinn attacks Hope, yelling that she had no reason to stick her pampered nose into this situation – that she is rich, pampered, and young and has ruined everything. As Hope and Quinn are fighting, Hope's mother Brooke Logan comes out to protect her daughter. Quinn tells Hope she doesn't want her anywhere near her son and walks off angrily. Meanwhile, Wyatt drives to his apartment and is packing his stuff. Bill and Liam go there to try to welcome him in as family. Wyatt is outraged at first but then Bill and Wyatt hug when Quinn comes in. Quinn tells Bill not to touch her son. Wyatt, still angry at his mother for lying to him, leaves and begins living in Liam's house with Bill, since Katie kicked him out. Bill then has dinner with Liam, Wyatt, and Hope.

Brooke appears at Katie's new office and continuously sticks up for Bill. Katie then tells Brooke that maybe Stephanie was right and Brooke's just a slut in the valley. Brooke then slaps Katie. Brooke goes to confront Katie again, but Katie snaps and Brooke leaves. Rick then tells Brooke Hope's engaged to Liam again (after 2 stopped marriages that never happened) and Brooke is joyful. Donna has a confrontation with Brooke and tells her this isn't all of Katie's fault and Katie's never going to forgive her if she keeps defending Bill, so Brooke apologizes to her sister. Katie lies about working late and asks Brooke and Bill to babysit Will and secretly spies on them through a spy book. Donna walks in and tells her that she is wrong but Katie has to know if she can trust them again. Katie then put in another spy camera, placing a bottle of alcohol on the table and asks both Brooke and Bill to babysit Will again. Bill goes for the alcohol and asked if it was alright for him to drink and Brooke said she doesn't mind at all. Bill realizes that he has an addiction to alcohol and swears to stop for Will. Brooke flies on a business trip to Monte Carlo with Donna. Bill alone at home hears a beep through the baby monitor, when he investigates the beep he finds the spy camera and looks around to discover all of them. Donna convinces Katie to take Bill back and when Katie returns home to ask Bill to move back in with her, Bill shows her the spy camera he found and tells her that he found all of them. They begin to argue and Bill whips the spy camera at Katie and leaves.

Bill flies to Monte Carlo to be with Brooke. He tells her his marriage is over and that he loves her and wants a life with her. Brooke tries to get Bill to go back to Katie however he tells her that his marriage is over. Brooke convinces Bill that she'd be with him only if he tells Katie. She believes that he and Katie will get back together. Katie begs Bill for another chance, but Bill tells that their marriage is over due to their problems regardless of Brooke. Bill's fury escalates during the confrontation and Brooke snaps at Katie and defended Bill again. Katie blames the whole thing on Brooke and states, Brooke and Bill have been blaming her for everything the whole time. Bill tells Katie that she planted the seeds of Brooke and Bill's relationship. As they're arguing Bill storms off and Katie tells Brooke that Brooke did this to Eric, Thorne, and Deacon and now she did it to her husband. Afterwards Katie calls Brooke to her office to tell her she's leaving town with Will for good, but she'll still run Spencer Publications. Katie returns 3 episodes later with Will wants Bill back. Bill then moves in with Brooke and proposes to her, stating that she was the first woman not to be afraid of him and that he had been waiting his entire life for her. Brooke was hesitant because of Katie however Bill tells her that his marriage would have been over even if he weren't with her, and he didn't love Katie anymore and believed that deep down Katie didn't love him, not the real him like Brooke. Although torn because of her sister, she agrees to marry Bill and keep the engagement a secret in an effort to ease her sister into it one day.

Bill and Brooke go rock climbing in Aspen, Colorado. After Bill dangles on a cliff, his life flashes before his eyes. Returning to Los Angeles, Bill ends it with Brooke and wants his family back with Katie. Katie takes Bill back and immediately, Justin shows up at the door with papers, to get his company back and shared custody of Will. Katie without thinking signs the documents. Bill then goes back to Brooke hoping to pick up where they left, he claims that he only lied because he knew Brooke wouldn't go along with it. He planned on a life with Brooke, his son, and his company, And that he lied to Katie just to get his life back. Katie walks in and hears this, both Brooke and Katie turn on Bill. Bill goes to his office, now in power again and Alison returns with Justin. Brooke replaces the papers with leaves, and Bill gets angry at her but Brooke doesn't return them to him. Brooke then throws Bill out and refuses to forgive him, claiming that when he broke her heart it gave her the strength to finally let go. Bill moves back in with Liam vowing to win her back, and agrees to support Liam and Hope's on-and-off relationship. Bill has constantly tries to get Brooke to take him back and states that she is the only woman for him. Brooke, though very much in love with Bill refuses to take him back hoping to mend her relationship with Katie. And although she loves him, she vows never to go back to him because it would hurt her sister.

In December 2013, Ridge comes back to town for Brooke and R.J. Brooke tells Ridge what has happened between her and Bill and shocks Ridge. Ridge then goes to Katie to hear her side of the story, and Ridge supports Katie and they begin to have an attraction towards each other. Brooke wants to reunite with Ridge mainly for Katie (who unbeknownst to her is sneaking around with Ridge) so she and Bill can reunite. Brooke believes that this will heal the families, regardless of her love for Bill she wants the family to mend their rift, something she couldn't have if she were with Bill. Bill asks her not marry Ridge and states that he loves her and only her and always would and was never ashamed of her. He was a real man and decisive unlike Ridge who was weak and would hurt her again and run when things got tough. Brooke cries when he leaves, but pulls herself together hoping to heal the family with Ridge.

At Brooke and Ridge's wedding, Carter, finds a poem he thinks represents Ridge and Brooke's relationship which happened to be Ridge and Katie's favorite poem, "Love's Philosophy". Katie and Ridge make eye contact with each other, and Katie faints, causing the wedding to be cancelled. To keep her mind off of her aborted wedding, Brooke decides to go with Hope on a business trip to Paris. After they come back, Katie tells Brooke she has feelings for Ridge and as Brooke is shocked, Ridge appears and agrees with Katie. Brooke then thinks it is cute that Katie has this "crush" but gets furious when Ridge claims they have true feelings. After Ridge leaves, Brooke and Katie argue about the situation and Brooke goes to Donna to talk. Donna tells her to go after Ridge however, Brooke fails to win back Ridge, as he left her to have sex with Katie. Bill later comes by and tells Brooke to let Ridge and Katie stay together, and asks her for another chance at them being together. On the day of Ridge and Brooke's wedding, Bill gets drunk and ends up having sex with Quinn.

== Reception ==
In 2020, Candace Young from Soaps She Knows put Bill on her list of the hottest soap opera villains, saying that "'Dollar' Bill Spencer may be known for his plotting and controlling behavior, and he has ruined dreams and even attempted murder, but he remains a stylish piece of eye-candy. Plus, we hear he's a stallion in the bedroom." In 2022, Charlie Mason from Soaps She Knows placed Bill 6th on his ranked list of The Bold and the Beautiful's Best of the Best Characters Ever, commenting that "The Young and the Restless' loss was most definitely The Bold and the Beautiful's gain when Don Diamont was killed off as Brad, thus freeing him up to bring to life a playboy who's since become one of soapdom's most infamous." Mason and Richard Simms named Bill as the "Most Ruined Character" of 2022, saying "What does Bold & Beautiful want us to think of Bill after, in a matter of minutes, he begged Brooke, then Katie to take him back? "Pathetic" is a very new and different look for the onetime power player." Jack Phillips from The List believed that Bill being surprisingly understanding of Karen's coming out and relationship with Danielle Spencer (Crystal Chappell) marked "a significant evolution in his character".
