= Carly Manning =

- Days of Our Lives character
- Portrayed by: Crystal Chappell
- Duration: 1990–1993; 2009–2011
- First appearance: June 12, 1990
- Last appearance: September 22, 2011
- Created by: Richard J. Allen and Anne Schoettle
- Introduced by: Ken Corday and Al Rabin (1990); Ken Corday and Gary Tomlin (2009)
- Spin-off appearances: Days of Our Lives: One Stormy Night (1992); Days of Our Lives: Night Sins (1993)
In-universe information
- Other names: Katerina Von Leuschner
- Occupation: Doctor
- Father: Henri Von Leuschner
- Brothers: Frankie Brady
- Spouse: Victor Kiriakis (1991); Bo Brady (1991–92); Lawrence Alamain (1993–2009)
- Sons: Nicholas Alamain
- Daughters: Melanie Jonas
- Uncles: Oskar Von Leuschner
- First cousins: Dimitri Von Leuschner

Carly Manning is a fictional character on the NBC soap opera Days of Our Lives. Crystal Chappell portrayed the character from June 12, 1990, to October 18, 1993. After a sixteen-year absence, she reprised the role on October 2, 2009, to September 22, 2011. Chappell's most memorable storyline was in 1993 when her longtime rival Vivian Alamain (Louise Sorel) buried her alive, which has become one of the show's most notorious plots. Along with Vivian, most of Carly's stories revolve around her ex-husband Bo Brady (Peter Reckell) and late husband Lawrence Alamain (Michael Sabatino).

== Casting ==
"I have loved playing this character. I had another job offer [after 'GL'], but the reason I went back [in 2009] to 'Days' is that I had created such bad energy when I was there before. I was a young, messed up person. I really wanted to go back and give this crew and these people good energy, laughs and entertainment. I know it sounds weird -- I'm an actor out of work -- but I feel I accomplished that. I walk away feeling so proud of what I did. I've had a long career."

— Crystal Chappell on her return and exit from Days of our Lives, 2011

Following the departure of Kristian Alfonso as heroine Hope Williams Brady in 1990, DAYS sought an actress for the newly created role of Carly Manning. Crystal Chappell joined the cast after her short-term role as drug dealer Jane Kingsley on another NBC soap opera, Santa Barbara when she was approached by the show's casting director Doris Sabbagh. Chappell studied acting at the University of Maryland, Baltimore and with legendary acting coach Sanford Meisner before she pursued the art professionally in 1989 after being cast as a day player on the ABC soap opera All My Children. By the time she began to appear as a regular on DAYS, she felt accomplished to have booked such a prominent role on a major show. After spending three years on the soap, Chappell left and eventually took roles on One Life to Live as Maggie Carpenter from 1995-1997 and Guiding Light as Olivia Spencer from 1999-2009, where she won a Daytime Emmy Award for Outstanding Supporting Actress in a Drama Series in 2002. After 16 years away, Chappell returned to the show in October 2009 following the cancellation of GL, which ended its run less than a month earlier. While meeting with executives of another show, Gary Tomlin, the co-executive of DAYS at the time called Chappell and asked her to return. After nearly two years back, Chappell's contract was not renewed and she exited the show in September 2011. Following her exit, Chappell joined the cast of CBS' The Bold and the Beautiful as Danielle in the show's first lesbian storyline.

== Storylines ==
=== 1990–93 ===
Dr. Carly Manning arrived in Salem after she got the idea to move there from the vacationing Adrienne Johnson Kiriakis and Justin Kiriakis. Carly believed Salem would be a suitable town to live in because no one knew her. After arriving in town, she was shocked to run into not one but two people from her past. First, there Jennifer Horton with whom she had attended boarding school and then Bo Brady who had intervened in a fight between her and her then-boyfriend, Lawrence Alamain. Luckily for Carly, Bo did not remember her and the two did not get along. Eventually, Bo and Carly developed feelings as she cared for his son Shawn-Douglas Brady. Carly discovered her brother Frankie Brady was being held captive by Lawrence Alamain., who agreed to release Frankie if Carly handed over her family fortune and his enemy Bo. Carly had recently been revealed to be Katerina, a member of the powerful European Von Leuschner family and was torn between saving her brother and the man she began to have feelings for. Meanwhile, Jack Deveraux found Frankie and Jennifer who was held captive. Carly and Bo continued to grow closer but he was unable to fully commit to her. Carly accepted a marriage proposal to marry his biological father Victor Kiriakis.

Carly was severely unhappy during her marriage to Victor and he knew she loved his son. Victor faked his death and move to Mexico, but after he was found the marriage was annulled and Carly accepted Bo's proposal but they never went through with a legal marriage following their symbolic ceremony. Carly began to remember her son whom died shortly after birth and told Bo what was on her mind. Bo learned that Carly became pregnant with the child of her boyfriend James, who was using an alias and was really Lawrence Alamain. She sought the help of his aunt Vivian Alamain, who secretly faked the child's death after he was born when it was believed he died of hydrocephalus. Vivian actually raised him as her own son, Nicholas Alamain. Vivian was unhappy at Carly and Nicholas' reunion and attempted to ruin Carly's life by framing her for the deaths of her own patients at the hospital to make Carly seem like an angel of mercy serial killer. Vivian injected cleaning fluid into the systems of Carly's terminally ill patients and Carly was considered the culprit. Vivian used a herbal medical treatment to place Carly into a coma to appear dead. In one of the most stunning plot lines ever to be featured on a daytime soap, Carly awoke in her coffin which was complete with enough essentials after she had been buried alive. Eventually, Vivian overcame her own lapsed reality from the herbs and had Lawrence release her. When everyone learned Carly was alive, Lawrence told her he wanted to have a life together with their son. After Bo and Carly agreed they could no longer make their relationship work, Carly, Lawrence and Nicholas left town to begin a new life in France.

=== 2009–11 ===
Almost sixteen years later, Carly and Lawrence are seen together in a hotel room in Monaco, where they are arguing. The altercation results in Carly stabbing her husband in the stomach with a letter opener as he mumbles his final words being "You'll never find..." Carly secretly left the country to come to Salem in hopes of getting help from Bo, the only person she ever trusted. While separated from his wife, Carly broke into Bo and Hope's house to ask for his help and he agreed to hide her in his house since the Alamains were looking for her. Soon after, Victor suspected that Carly was back in Salem and reported her to the police and she was arrested but later released back into the custody of Bo. Vivian then cleared Carly's name in order to get revenge on her rather than have her in punished in prison for Lawrence's murder. Vivian soon learned that Carly had a daughter living in town, which turns out to be Melanie Layton, whom Lawrence gave up for adoption due to Carly's affair with another man. Carly accidentally shot Melanie on her wedding day to Philip Kiriakis when trying to stop Vivian from killing her out of revenge. After being released from prison, revisiting her relationship with Bo and repairing her relationships with Melanie and her daughter's father Daniel Jonas, Carly eventually got involved in keeping the secret of Chloe Lane's son. The child turned out to be the son of Chloe's ex-boyfriend Philip and not her husband Daniel (but later this was revealed to be untrue and the result of Caroline Brady switching the DNA results). After ruining the bonds she shared with everyone around her, including Bo who got back together with his wife Hope, Carly turned to drugs after falling in love with Daniel, and being distraught about his relationship with her best friend, Jennifer, and eventually entered rehab under the care of Dr. Norman. Following a reunion with Nicholas and renewing her relationships with those she hurt, Carly left town to travel Europe with her son. In late 2012, her daughter, Melanie, went to live with her in Europe.

== Reception ==
"Crystal appears to be always prepared and knows what she wants from the material. I like to be surprised during the course of a scene, by my reaction and to my partners action and reaction. Crystal always gives me something I never see in rehearsal; as actors, we want to save stuff for the camera. Crystal always does."

— Wally Kurth on his DAYS co-star Chappell's professionalism, We Love Soaps, 2010

Throughout the character's run, Carly has remained one of the show's most popular characters, which is largely due to the storyline that saw her buried alive, which is attributed to the rise in ratings at the time the storyline aired. The storyline is often considered to be one of the most shocking plot lines in popular culture history. Chappell's popularity in the role led her to win the "Hottest Female Star" award at the 9th Soap Opera Digest Awards ceremony in 1993, at the 39th Daytime Emmy Awards she earned a daytime Emmy nomination for Outstanding Lead Actress in a Drama Series in 2012. The character is also considered to be "the one true viable threat to super-duo Bo and Hope," played by Peter Reckell and Kristian Alfonso, because her relationship with Bo has generated a large following and notable storylines and rivals that of the supercouple. When she made her long-awaited return in 2009, Chappell was thrust into a story surrounding Carly's biological daughter Melanie Jonas, played by Molly Burnett. Off-screen, Chappell became a friend and mentor to Burnett and at the time of her co-star's exit, Burnett said, "Crystal brings her A game every time she films a scene. So you want to bring yours to stay with her. She always inspired me to work really hard." Chappell's professionalism is often noted by her colleagues on the shows she has appeared on, including Days of Our Lives actor Wally Kurth, Guiding Light and One Life to Live actress Jessica Leccia and writer Claire Labine who was instrumental in the creation of Chappell's storylines on GL and OLTL. In 2020, Belinda Jepsen from Mamamia put Carly being buried alive by Vivian on her list of the five "most ridiculous storylines" that occurred on Days of Our Lives, calling the storyline "dark".
