= Karen Spencer =

- The Bold and the Beautiful character
- Portrayed by: Joanna Johnson
- Duration: 1991–1994; 2009; 2011–2014
- First appearance: December 11, 1991
- Last appearance: April 18, 2014
- Created by: William J. Bell
In-universe information
- Other names: Faith Roberts
- Occupation: Businesswoman; Waitress
- Family: Spencer
- Father: Bill Spencer
- Mother: Marion Spencer
- Sisters: Caroline Spencer Forrester
- Half-brothers: Bill Spencer, Jr.
- Spouse: Connor Davis (1994); Danielle Spencer (1990s–)
- Daughters: Caroline Spencer
- Grandsons: Douglas Forrester
- Nephews: Wyatt Spencer; Liam Spencer; Will Spencer

Karen Spencer is a fictional character on the CBS soap opera, The Bold and the Beautiful played by Joanna Johnson.

== Casting ==
After Joanna Johnson's character Caroline Spencer Forrester was killed off the show, Karen was created to bring back Johnson to the Soap Opera. She first appeared on December 11, 1991 and remained until June 10, 1994. Johnson briefly returned to the role on April 28, 2009, and again in May 2012 for a several week brief story-arc.

Johnson was announced to be returning to the series in March 2012 with her daughter, Caroline. In April 2012, it was announced that Crystal Chappell would join the cast of The Bold and the Beautiful as Caroline's "other" mother and Karen's wife, Danielle. Despite having a busy schedule, Johnson reprised the role again in 2014, appearing on April 17 and 18 of that year.

== Storylines ==
Karen was kidnapped as an infant under the name Faith Roberts and was raised in Texas by a waitress named Bonnie Roberts. Ridge Forrester was married to her identical twin sister Caroline Spencer (Johnson), who died of leukemia and married her psychiatrist Taylor Hayes. Taylor's ex-husband Blake Hayes wanted Taylor back and discovered Caroline had an identical twin sister who had been kidnapped as a baby. Blake found her in Texas and found out she was Caroline's twin sister. Blake dyed her hair like Caroline's so Karen could lure Ridge away from Taylor. Her father Bill Spencer found out and Ridge only wanted her as a friend. Blake was furious and left town. Ridge's brother Thorne, who had also been married to Caroline, began to date Karen. Thorne had Karen move in with him and his wife Macy Alexander. Thorne admits to having feelings for both of them and begins a relationship with Karen. Karen also befriended Brooke Logan. Thorne went back to Macy and Karen began a friendship with attorney Connor Davis. Sheila Carter wanted more power in Forrester Creations and by taking a picture of Karen and Connor kissing and got Connor fired but when Karen admit he was just a friend Shelia's plan failed. Karen enjoyed spending time with Forrester Creations' rival the Spectra Fashions. Karen began to be more involved with Connor and had him take and HIV test and he was negative but Karen was ready. Connor gave Karen a few drinks and went to bed together. Connor felt bad and told this to Macy. Macy decided to give him what he deserved. Connor gave Karen a surprise wedding. After they got married Connor went on a date with Darla Einstein, an employee at Spectra. Karen felt terrible, made peace with Connor, and returned Spectra to Sally Spectra before leaving L.A.

It was revealed that Karen had been working for her father at Spencer Publications in New York City. Stephanie called her to offer her condolences about the death of her father. She was present for the reading of her father's will where in it, he bequeathed 50% of Spencer Publications to her and the other 50% to her half-brother Bill Spencer Jr. She and Bill Jr. were also named the successor Co-CEOs of Spencer Publications. Although Karen was hesitant to assume the role, Stephanie assured her she would do a fine job. Karen then decided to stay around town and befriended Nick Marone. Karen attended her half-brother's wedding to Katie Logan in November 2009. She left town again shortly after, and focused on running the East Coast division of Spencer Publications back in New York. She returns in for Katie's surprise vow renewal ceremony in 2011.

Karen had a surprise of her own: a grown-up daughter she named after her late twin sister. Caroline was a budding designer that Brooke recruited to work with her son, Rick Forrester, in an attempt to keep Rick away from his scheming ex-wife, Amber Moore. Caroline moved to Los Angeles in 2012, and was soon followed by Karen and Karen's friend, Danielle.

Karen invites Caroline and her boyfriend, Thomas over. However, Karen insisted that Caroline keep the "family secret" when Thomas kept asking about Caroline's father. But Caroline finally convinced Karen to admit that Danielle was her spouse and Caroline's second mother. Thomas took the news in stride, but Karen was adamant that Bill not discover she had come out as a lesbian, even as Karen arranged to have Danielle interview with Bill for a job at Spencer.

Caroline later reveals to Thomas that Karen's father wanted Karen to marry a junior executive at Spencer Publications but she refused. When he found out about Karen's relationship with Danielle, he refused to meet Danielle or acknowledge that Karen had a partner. He also forced Karen to keep it a secret from everyone, including Bill Spencer, Jr., and nearly disinherited Karen. With Danielle's encouragement, Karen finally found the courage to come out to Bill. Bill accepted Danielle into the family. Months later, Karen and Danielle rushed to Caroline's side when she fell over a balcony during an argument with Bill. Caroline swore it was an accident, but Karen, among others, couldn't help wondering if Bill had pushed Caroline.

When it's revealed that Bill had an affair with his sister-in-law, Brooke Logan, Katie divorces Bill and, as part of the settlement, Katie receives 1% ownership of Spencer Publications. Karen and Katie combine their stock, fire Bill from Spencer Publications and make Katie CEO of Spencer Publications.

Many months later, with Spencer faltering under Katie's leadership, Brooke and Bill approached Karen, asking her to reinstate Bill as CEO. Karen appreciated Bill's efforts to change, but she opted to keep Katie in the position. However, Brooke had kept papers Bill once tricked Katie into signing, documents which would give Bill joint custody of his and Katie's son, Will, as well as control of Spencer Publications again. Brooke had stopped Bill from filing them, but now used them to force Katie to relinquish the CEO position to Bill. Karen leaves L.A. for New York with Danielle. The two make their home in NYC once again, with Karen back to running the East Coast operations of Spencer Publications. Karen and Danielle later hosted Caroline for an extended visit. When Caroline is struck by a car, Karen and Danielle help their daughter convalesce.

== Reception ==
Charlie Mason and Dustin Cushman from Soaps She Knows put Karen and Danielle on their list of Daytime's Groundbreaking LGBTQ+ Characters and Couples but were disappointed with their lack of development, writing that "Unfortunately, an introduction to the couple was about all we got." Speaking of her 2014 return, Michael Fairman from Michael Fairman TV wrote that it "will be nice to have Joanna home albeit for visit!"
