= Caroline Spencer (disambiguation) =

Caroline Spencer is two character(s) from two eras of the soap opera The Bold and the Beautiful.

- Caroline Spencer Forrester matriarch aunt seen in the 1980s and early 1990s and later namesake niece below:
- Caroline Spencer see in the 2010s

Caroline Spencer may also refer to:

- Caroline Berryman Spencer (1861–1948), socialite and editor of Illustrated American
- Caroline Spencer, Duchess of Marlborough (1743–1811), wife of George Spencer, 4th Duke of Marlborough
- Caroline Spencer (suffragist) (1861–1928), American physician and suffragist
