= Caroline Spencer =

- The Bold and the Beautiful character
- Portrayed by: Linsey Godfrey
- Duration: 2012–2018
- First appearance: March 28, 2012
- Last appearance: March 19, 2018
- Created by: Bradley Bell
- Introduced by: Bradley Bell (2012)
- Book appearances: Blindsided By Love (2014)
- Crossover appearances: The Young and the Restless (2014)
In-universe information
- Other names: Caroline Forrester
- Occupation: Fashion designer
- Family: Spencer
- Mother: Karen Spencer
- Adoptive mother: Danielle Spencer
- Husband: Rick Forrester (2013–2015); Ridge Forrester (2015–2016)
- Sons: Douglas Forrester
- Grandfathers: Bill Spencer
- Uncles: Bill Spencer Jr.
- Aunts: Caroline Spencer Forrester
- First cousins: Wyatt Spencer; Liam Spencer; Will Spencer

Caroline Spencer is a fictional character from The Bold and the Beautiful, an American soap opera on the CBS network. Created by producer Bradley Bell, she is portrayed by actress Linsey Godfrey. She is the daughter of media mogul Karen Spencer (Joanna Johnson), niece of media mogul Bill Spencer Jr. (Don Diamont), and namesake of her aunt, Caroline Spencer Forrester (Johnson).

== Casting ==
On February 7, 2012, it was announced that Joanna Johnson would reprise the role of Karen Spencer and would be arriving alongside her never-before-heard-of-and-seen daughter Caroline, the namesake of deceased twin sister Caroline Spencer. It was announced that actress Linsey Godfrey was cast into the new role. Godfrey is known for her roles on several television series such as NCIS, One Tree Hill, and Wizards of Waverly Place. The character, while unknown to viewers, would be acknowledged and known to those on-screen. In April 2012, it was announced that Crystal Chappell would enter the cast of the series as Caroline's second mother, in the series' first ever lesbian storyline. Godfrey has a tattoo to symbolize her successful battle with Hodgkin's lymphoma, which the producers wrote into the show.

In February 2014, a crossover event between The Bold and the Beautiful and The Young and the Restless was announced involving Godfrey's character along with the character of Rick Forrester played by Jacob Young. Godfrey's appearances on The Young and the Restless were April 14 and 16, 2014. Godfrey took a short break from The Bold and the Beautiful in 2015 when she was hit by a car that February; she returned to set on March 4 of that year, with her co-stars praising her and expressing their happiness of her return, whilst Godfrey expressed excitement at returning. Caroline began reappearing onscreen on May 22 of that year.

In December 2016, Godfrey was put on recurring status with the show. In May 2017, Godfrey told Soap Opera Digest that she hasn't heard from the show since her last appearance on October 31, 2016. That same month, Godfrey announced she was back taping at the serial. Godfrey made her re-appearance from July to September 2017 and then in March 2018. In July 2018, it was announced that Godfrey had joined the cast of Days of Our Lives, effectively ending her run as Caroline.

== Development ==
Caroline's initial storyline revolves around a storyline about her and her same-sex mothers, Karen (Joanna Johnson) and Danielle Spencer (Crystal Chappell), entitled "My Two Moms". Caroline was noted by head writer Bradley Bell and writers Patrick Mulcahey and Tracey Ann Kelly to represent a younger generational view of her mother's sexuality; Kelly stated: "She did not understand the need to feel secretive, whereas her mother, having dealt with this in a much different time, felt very different about it. So I felt it was wonderful to see the generational difference in the attitude." Caroline's importance in the storyline was a key aspect, as her mothers had their "hands full" while coming together to help Caroline deal with her own problems. The role of Caroline was involved in three romances, first with Thomas Forrester (Adam Gregory, then Pierson Fodé), before she moved on to his arch-rival Rick Forrester (Jacob Young). She then married Thomas' father Ridge Forrester (Ronn Moss, then Thorsten Kaye).

Rick falls out of love with Caroline and begins falling for an underprivileged aspiring actress, Maya Avant (Karla Mosley); he attempts to dump her but Caroline begins scheming to remove Maya from his life. By this point, she was described by Jamey Giddens of the website Zap2it as "cunning" and scheming "blonde vixen", enjoying her new "fantastically-bitchy" persona. Joanna Johnson, upon her return to the series, characterized Caroline as having changed into "a total bad-ass crazy person" who needed "mothering". Speaking on her character's progression, Godfrey explained: "I really love the dimension that [the writers] added to Caroline because when I first came on the show, she was this very sweet and very meek girl. Then she became this very sassy, aggressive 'mean girl.' I was so excited when they turned her into a layered woman who had these very strong thoughts and opinions and didn’t back down to anyone, but she also wasn’t being a catty little girl any more. She was just strong."

== Storylines ==
In March 2012, Karen Spencer (Joanna Johnson) returned to town with a surprise trip for her daughter, Caroline to Los Angeles for an interview at Forrester Creations. Brooke Logan (Katherine Kelly Lang) and Ridge Forrester (Ronn Moss) plan to use Caroline's arrival as a collaborator for Rick Forrester (Jacob Young) and his new line, while Brooke has ulterior motives to use her as a distraction for Rick from Amber Moore (Adrienne Frantz). Upon arrival, both Brooke and Ridge offer a trial deal with Caroline, sparking concern with Karen over their intentions, especially those of Brooke. Caroline accepts the job, as well as Rick. At a welcoming party at the Forrester Estate, Caroline is introduced to everyone in the company. She is, however, given a very dishonest welcome and toast by Amber. She later admits that she felt like she had a special kinship with her aunt Caroline (Johnson), and announced her decision to bring The Caroline Spencer Cancer Foundation, a research fund she runs for her aunt, to Los Angeles.

And the party, Ridge brings Caroline to the guest house where he stayed with Caroline, where he shared several memories about Caroline including the charm bracelet he gave to her. She then revealed to Ridge the cancer ribbon she got in honor of Caroline, located on the back of her neck. As Caroline begins to grow a deeper connection to Rick, Amber begins to manipulate her into believing he enjoys dressing in drag. She catches him in photos wearing dresses, lipstick and walking the Forrester runway in five-inch heels. This continues to drive her away from Rick, believing he is playing her and not being truthful about his true intentions. She then begins to develop a relationship with Thomas Forrester (Adam Gregory); as her relationship intensifies with him, she introduces him to Karen and her life partner, Danielle (Crystal Chappell). They also work together to free Marcus Barber Forrester (Texas Battle) from charges accusing him of running over his friend, Anthony, the night before his wedding to Dayzee Leigh (Kristolyn Lloyd). Thomas and Caroline begin to get serious, even though Rick is interested in Caroline and intends to steal her away from Thomas. Caroline's relationship with Thomas began to hit shaky ground when Thomas began supporting his ex, Hope Logan (Kim Matula), following her split from Caroline's cousin, Liam Spencer (Scott Clifton). Ridge names Thomas interim CEO of Forrester Creations, over Rick, Caroline begins to see a change in him. Thomas and Rick have an argument during which Rick falls out of a window and falsely claims Thomas pushed him. Caroline breaks up with Thomas and starts dating Rick. The relationship starts out well but begins to suffer when Rick meets a woman named Maya. Rick ends his relationship with Caroline after her bad treatment of Maya and the two start dating. Caroline than makes it her mission to get Rick back by helping him with the rebranding of "Hope for the Future" which in turn plays on Maya's insecurities. After a series of misunderstandings, encouraged by Caroline. Maya breaks up with Rick and he reunites with Caroline. The two soon become engaged and with Rick's insistence, they marry in front of their family and friends at the Forrester Mansion on Thanksgiving. Also the mother of Douglas Forrester.

In March 2019, it is revealed that Caroline had died following a blood clot.

== Reception ==
For her portrayal of Caroline, Godfey was nominated for Outstanding Supporting Actress in a Drama Series at the 42nd Daytime Emmy Awards. Following the character's death, Chris Eades from Soaps In Depth called Caroline a "talented, vibrant young woman who would never be forgotten". Jamey Giddens from Daytime Confidential called Caroline "scheming" when she was trying to bust Rick and Maya.
