= Venice: The Series =

- Genre: Soap opera; Web series
- Created by: Crystal Chappell; Kim Turrisi
- Starring: Crystal Chappell; Jessica Leccia; Galen Gering; Hillary B. Smith; Gina Tognoni; Nadia Bjorlin; Lesli Kay; Dot Jones; Shawn Christian; Molly Burnett; Eric Martsolf; Judi Evans; Michelle N. Carter; Jordan Clarke; Harrison White; Michael Sabatino; Liz Keifer; Adrienne Wilkinson; Christian LeBlanc; Annika Noelle; Peter Reckell; Patti Pelton; Aaron Hartzler; Wesley Ramsey; Tina Sloan; Gregory Zarian; Elizabeth Scott; Mandahla Rose
- Country of origin: United States
- No. of seasons: 6
- No. of episodes: 65

Production
- Executive producers: Crystal Chappell; Kim Turrisi; Hope Royaltey
- Production location: Venice Beach, California
- Running time: 6–10 minutes (season 1); approx. 15 minutes (seasons 2–6)
- Production company: Open Book Productions

Original release
- Network: YouTube (seasons 1–2); Vimeo (seasons 3–6)
- Release: December 4, 2009 – present

Related
- The Grove: The Series

Venice: The Series is a soap opera web series co-produced by and starring American actress Crystal Chappell. The series was inspired in part by the "Otalia" storyline on the daytime drama Guiding Light. The series has been streamed on VenicetheSeries.com since December 4, 2009, and currently has six seasons with a seventh being in production.

Venice is described by Chappell as "a show about families, and life, and all the simplicity of it, and the turmoil of it. We're going to be following a character named Gina who is a designer, and she is a gay woman."

== Cast and characters ==
Chappell, Leccia and Bjorlin

Venice: The Series stars Crystal Chappell as Gina, a designer and a gay woman, and Chappell's love interest from Guiding Light, Jessica Leccia, this time as Ani, Gina's love interest. Some of Chappell's and Leccia's former Guiding Light co-stars also appear in the series, including Tina Sloan, Gina Tognoni as Sami and Jordan Clarke as The Colonel. Other Venice cast members include daytime actress Hillary B. Smith of One Life to Live as Guya, Nadia Bjorlin as Lara, Galen Gering as Owen, Gina's brother, Michelle N. Carter as Michele, Lesli Kay as Tracy, Michael Sabatino, Chappell's husband, as Alan, and Robert Newman as an old boyfriend of Gina's. Other cast members include Shawn Christian, Eric Martsolf and Molly Burnett from Days of Our Lives. Gregory Zarian joined the cast in Season 5 as Detective Nick Pfander.

== Production ==
=== Creation and development ===
Crystal Chappell played Olivia Spencer on the long-running CBS daytime drama, Guiding Light, from 1999 until the September 18, 2009 network ending. She won a Daytime Emmy Award for Outstanding Supporting Actress in a Daytime Drama for her work as Olivia in 2002 and was nominated again in the same category in 2005 and 2006. In 2007, she earned her first nomination in the Outstanding Lead Actress category and her second in 2010.

In 2009, after Guiding Light was cancelled, Chappell, with help from her writing partner and co-producer Kim Turrisi, decided to create Venice: The Series drawing inspiration from the popular romance between her Guiding Light character, Olivia Spencer, and GL co-star Jessica Leccia's character, Natalia Rivera Aitoro, also known by the portmanteau "Otalia". However, for copyright reasons, the names of the two actresses' characters are changed, and there is no official connection to Guiding Light.

Although Chappell's character in the show is an openly gay woman, the show is not a "gay web series" but rather a show that "embodies all kinds of people, with all kinds of issues".

Chappell heavily publicized the series through the social networking sites Twitter and Facebook.

=== Filming ===
The web series is set in, and filmed in, Venice Beach, California, United States. It is filmed digitally. Each episode of season 1 is 6–10 minutes long, while episodes from subsequent seasons run approximately 15 minutes.

== Distribution and release ==
The first three seasons were released for free, and are viewable, on the video sharing website YouTube. The fourth, fifth and sixth seasons are available streaming on the show's website to rent or buy.

DVDs of past seasons of the show are also available for sale online at the website.

== Reception and awards ==
In 2011, Venice: The Series won the first Daytime Emmy Award for Outstanding Special Class Short Format Daytime, and won again in 2014 for Outstanding New Approaches Drama Series. The series was nominated for a Daytime Emmy Award for Outstanding Digital Daytime Drama Series in 2017. In 2018, Venice was nominated for Outstanding Digital Daytime Drama Series and Outstanding Directing in a Digital Drama Series.

Writing for Entertainment Weekly, Alina Adams named the series one of the "4 best soap operas on the web" in 2015.
