= Jordan Clarke (actor) =

American actor (born 1950)

- Born: July 21, 1950 (age 76); Rochester, New York, U.S.
- Education: Cornell University (BA, MFA)
- Occupation: Actor

Jordan Clarke (born July 21, 1950) is an American actor known for his role in the CBS soap opera, Guiding Light

== Early life and education ==
Clarke was born in Rochester, New York. He attended Cornell University and trained as an actor at New York University.

== Career ==
Clarke made a number of guest appearances on shows in the late-1970s and early-1980s, including MASH, CHiPs, The Paper Chase, Law & Order, Spenser: For Hire, and Miami Vice. He also played the role of Son Slater in an episode of The Waltons.

=== Guiding Light ===
Clarke had two high-profile roles on the CBS soap opera, Guiding Light. The first role, Dr. Tim Ryan, ran from 1974 to 1976.

He is perhaps best known for his second GL role, as Billy Lewis. He played Billy on and off from the character's debut in 1982 to the show's end in 2009. In 2006, he received his first nomination and won his first Daytime Emmy for "Best Supporting Actor in a Drama Series" for his work on GL, an especially notable victory as he was not a contract player on the show at the time.

=== Other roles ===
Clarke also appeared in the web soap Venice: The Series with former Guiding Light costar Crystal Chappell. Clarke plays the father of Chappell's character on the show. Clarke had a mild stroke during the first season of Venice, but has since recovered.

Clarke's life and career were the focus of a 2015 BuzzFeed article, "My Handyman, My Soap Star." Writer David Kushner covered several years where Clarke worked as a handyman and helped Kushner repair his new home, all while still making appearances on Guiding Light.

== Filmography ==
=== Film ===
Year	Title	Role	Notes
1994	Safe Passage	Coach	
1996	White Squall	Charles Gieg	

=== Television ===
Year	Title	Role	Notes
1977	The Tony Randall Show	'Wild Doug' McIntire	Episode: "Case: The Hero Syndrome"
1978	M*A*S*H	Saunders	Episode: "The Smell of Music"
1978	Forever	Theo Maxton	Television film
1978	Fantasy Island	Tommy Prentiss	2 episodes
1979	Charleston	Gregg Morgan	Television film
1979	The Paper Chase	Snow	Episode: "The Apprentice"
1979	The Waltons	Son Slater	Episode: "The Violated"
1979	CHiPs	Don Croyden	2 episodes
1979	Paris	Brian Davenport	Episode: "Dead Men Don't Kill"
1980	Three's Company	Bill	Episode: "Chrissy's Cousin"
1981	Norma Rae	Frank Osborne	Television film
1982	The Executioner's Song	Johnny Nicol	Television film
1983	Knight Rider	Ferris	Episode: "Short Notice"
1983–2009	Guiding Light	Billy Lewis	471 episodes
1987	Spenser: For Hire	Brad Griffin	Episode: "My Brother's Keeper"
1988	Crossbow	Friar Lot	Episode: "Message to Geneva"
1988	Knightwatch	McKinney	Episode: "Codes"
1989	Miami Vice	Mac Mulhern	Episode: "Hard Knocks"
1990	The Kennedys of Massachusetts	James Reedy	3 episodes
1995	Law & Order	Mr. Parker	Episode: "Seed"
1995	The Cosby Mysteries	Gordon Gansa	Episode: "The Medium Is the Message"
1995	Little Criminals	Sam	Television film
2002	A Wedding Story: Josh and Reva	Billy Lewis	Television film
2005	Law & Order: Criminal Intent	Bernie Moreno	Episode: "View From Up Here"
2009–2016	Venice: The Series	John Brogno	49 episodes
