= Jessica Leccia =

American actress (born 1976)

- Born: January 8, 1976 (age 50); New York City, New York, U.S.
- Years active: 2001–present
- Known for: Natalia Rivera Aitoro on Guiding Light
- Awards: 2008 ALMA Award Outstanding Performance in a Daytime Drama Series Guiding Light

Jessica Leccia /ləˈtʃiːə/, lə-CHEE-ə; (born January 8, 1976) is an American actress. She is known for her portrayals of Natalia Rivera on Guiding Light from 2007 to 2009 and of Inez Salinger on One Life to Live from 2010 to 2011.

== Early life and education ==
Leccia was born in New York City, New York. She received a B.A. from Bloomsburg University.

== Career ==
Leccia is best known for her portrayal of Natalia Rivera Aitoro on the American daytime drama Guiding Light. Prior to joining Guiding Light, Leccia had a recurring role on the television show Rescue Me starring Denis Leary. Leccia also guest-starred on the American daytime drama As the World Turns.

Leccia joined the cast of Guiding Light on April 25, 2007, as Natalia Rivera, Gus Aitoro's long lost high school sweetheart. Leccia's character Natalia was paired with Crystal Chappell's character Olivia Spencer during the last several months of Guiding Light, which ended its 72-year run on 18 September 2009.

Leccia worked with Guiding Light castmate Chappell again on Chappell's new webseries, Venice: The Series, in which she played Ani, a photographer and ex-girlfriend of Chappell's character, Gina. Along with Chappell and Leccia, other Guiding Light stars Jordan Clarke, Tina Sloan, and Gina Tognoni joined the cast of Venice. Venice aired its first episode on December 4, 2009.

Leccia also made appearances on Law & Order: Trial by Jury and Love Monkey.

From June 2010 to May 2011, Leccia portrayed Inez Salinger on One Life to Live and also as Ivy on The Grove: The Series.

== Personal life ==
She has been married to Brian Malloy since May 3, 2008. The couple welcomed their daughter Ivy Lola Malloy, on June 10, 2009.

Leccia has said that she enjoys watching the television series Lost and that her favorite singer is Stevie Wonder.

== Filmography ==
Film
Year	Title	Role	Notes
2001	Snipes	Receptionist	
2005	Preaching to the Choir	Groupie	
2006	Slippery Slope	Stacy	
2006	The Wedding Album	Jasmine	TV movie
2013	Tio Papi	Daniella	
2017	A Million Happy Nows	Eva Morales	

Television
Year	Title	Role	Notes
2005	Law & Order: Trial by Jury	Hope Newhall	Episode: "Pattern of Conduct"
2005	Rescue Me	Mary Magdelene	4 episodes
2006	Love Monkey	Detective Aida Perez	Episode: "Opportunity Knocks"
2006	As the World Turns	Innocencia	1 episode
2007	Queens Supreme	Erin Glover	Episode: "Case by Case"
2007–2009	Guiding Light	Natalia Rivera	247 episodes
2009–Present	Venice: The Series	Ani Martin	65 episodes
2010	Mercy	Camilla	Episode: "We All Saw This Coming"; Episode: "Too Much Attitude and Not Enough Underwear"
2010–2011	One Life to Live	Inez Salinger	59 episodes
2012	NYC 22	Sarah	Episode: "Schooled"
2012	30 Rock	Maria	Episode: "There's No I in America"
2013	The Grove	Ivy	TV movie
2013	The Carrie Diaries	Woman in Bar	Episode: "Read Before Use"
2020	Beacon Hill: The Series	Susan Preston	3 episodes
2025	Law & Order	Odette Ruiz	Episode: "Sins of the Father"

== Awards ==
=== Nominated ===
- 2008 ALMA Award Outstanding Performance in a Daytime Drama Series (Guiding Light)

== See also ==
- Olivia Spencer and Natalia Rivera Aitoro
- List of supercouples
