= Linsey Godfrey =

American actress

- Occupation: Actress
- Years active: 2005–present
- Children: 1

Linsey Godfrey is an American actress. She played Caroline Spencer on the CBS soap opera The Bold and the Beautiful from March 2012 to October 2016, before returning in a recurring capacity from December 2016 to March 2018. She played Sarah Horton on the NBC/Peacock soap opera Days of Our Lives from July 2018 to March 2021 before returning in January 2022. For her performances, she has received seven Daytime Emmy Award nominations, including one for Outstanding Younger Actress in a Drama Series and six for Outstanding Supporting Actress in a Drama Series.

== Early life ==
Godfrey was raised in Stuart, Florida where she lived with her mother, Char Griggs. Godfrey attended South Fork High School before she moved to Los Angeles to further her acting career. She is an accomplished angler. In 2006, Godfrey was visiting her family in Tallahassee when she was diagnosed with Hodgkin's lymphoma. She completed treatment in seven months and returned to Los Angeles to continue her acting career. She designed the survivor ribbon tattooed on the back of her neck.

== Career ==
Godfrey's acting career began as a freshman at South Fork High School, when she unexpectedly replaced an ill student; she was then discovered by a talent manager at a state thespian competition. Godfrey commuted to the Los Angeles-based agency's satellite office in Titusville for a year before being allowed to visit California with her mother and audition there. Her family took out a loan, and her mother worked three jobs to finance these visits. Eventually, her mother left her in the care of friends and her management team so she could return to work. Godfrey booked roles on One Tree Hill and Surface before being diagnosed with Hodgkin's lymphoma; she estimates cancer set her career back by two years. Upon returning to Hollywood, Godfrey booked several guest-starring roles and landed a role on The Bold and the Beautiful as series regular Caroline Spencer. In July 2018, it was announced she joined the cast of Days of Our Lives as Sarah Horton. In March 2021, Godfrey announced her departure from the soap, exiting on March 29. On January 7, 2022, it was announced that Godfrey would be reprising her role, beginning the week of January 17.

== Personal life ==
On December 5, 2013, it was announced that Godfrey was expecting her first child with boyfriend, The Young and the Restless actor Robert Adamson. She gave birth to a daughter Aleda Seren Adamson, on June 12, 2014. In August 2014, Godfrey helped to raise awareness of the disease ALS by participating in the Ice Bucket Challenge. On August 3, 2015, after months of speculation, a representative for The Bold and the Beautiful confirmed that Adamson and Godfrey had ended their engagement; however, they would continue to raise their daughter "in a loving and amicable environment and her needs will always be their common priority." In late-2017, Godfrey began a relationship with actor Breckin Meyer. She was injured in an automobile accident on February 2, 2015, after being struck by a moving car while walking on the sidewalk in Los Angeles. While it was initially reported that both of her legs were broken, a rep for the actress said it was only her ankles that were injured and she is expected to make a full recovery. In May 2019, Godfrey publicly stated that she had an abortion and that she did not regret her decision to get one. On March 9, 2021, Godfrey revealed on Instagram that she has been diagnosed with bipolar 2 and borderline personality disorder. Godfrey is a celebrity ambassador for the NGO INARA. Founded by Arwa Damon in 2015, the organization provides medical treatment to children injured as a result of war. She came out as bisexual in 2021.

== Filmography ==
=== Film ===
Year	Title	Role	Notes
2008	The House Bunny	Short Brunette Girl	
2010	The Assignment	Eliza	
2012	My Funny Valentine	Jayna	
2013	The Culling	Amanda	
2014	Altergeist	Sarah	
2018	Fatal Fashion	Jennifer Higgins	

=== Television ===
Year	Title	Role	Notes
2005	One Tree Hill	Barbara	Episode: "Between Order and Randomness"
2006	Surface	Caitlin Blum	Episodes: "1.11", "1.12", "1.13", "1.15"
2006	NCIS	Stephanie Phillips	Episode: "Bait"
2007	Cold Case	Samantha 'Sam' Randall (1965)	Episode: "Boy Crazy"
2010	Jack's Family Adventure	Charlotte Vickery	TV movie
2010	The Suite Life on Deck	Willa Fink	Episode: "My Sister's Keeper"
2011	CSI: Miami	Blair Hawkins	Episode: "Stoned Cold"
2011	Wizards of Waverly Place	Lucy	Episode: "Ghost Roommate"
2012–2018	The Bold and the Beautiful	Caroline Spencer	Regular role: March 28, 2012 – October 31, 2016; recurring role: December 19, 2016 – March 19, 2018
2014	The Young and the Restless	Caroline Spencer	Guest role: 2 episodes (April 14 and 16, 2014)
2018	He's Watching	Angela	TV movie
2018–present	Days of Our Lives	Sarah Horton	Regular role: October 26, 2018 – March 29, 2021; January 2022–present

== Awards and nominations ==
List of acting awards and nominations
Year	Award	Category	Title	Result	Ref.
2014	Daytime Emmy Award	Outstanding Younger Actress in a Drama Series	The Bold and the Beautiful	Nominated	
2015	Daytime Emmy Award	Outstanding Supporting Actress in a Drama Series	The Bold and the Beautiful	Nominated	
2016	Daytime Emmy Award	Outstanding Supporting Actress in a Drama Series	The Bold and the Beautiful	Nominated	
2017	Soap Awards France	Couple of the Year — "Caroline and Ridge" (shared with Thorsten Kaye)	The Bold and the Beautiful	Nominated	
2019	Daytime Emmy Award	Outstanding Supporting Actress in a Drama Series	Days of Our Lives	Nominated	
2024	Daytime Emmy Award	Outstanding Supporting Actress in a Drama Series	Days of Our Lives	Nominated	
2025	Daytime Emmy Award	Outstanding Supporting Actress in a Drama Series	Days of Our Lives	Nominated	
2026	Daytime Emmy Award	Outstanding Supporting Actress in a Drama Series	Days of Our Lives	Nominated	
