= Michael Sabatino =

American actor (born 1955)

- Born: June 25, 1955 (age 71); Venice, California
- Occupation: Actor
- Years active: 1981–present
- Spouse: Crystal Chappell (1997–present)
- Children: 2

Michael Sabatino (born June 25, 1955 in Venice, California) is an American actor.

== Personal life ==
Sabatino attended the University of California, Irvine, where he set a school record for the pole vault of 17½ feet.

Married to Laura Bassett 1982-1991

He has been married to actress Crystal Chappell since January 8, 1997. They have two sons, Jacob Walker (born May 11, 2000) and Dylan Michael (born September 2, 2003).

== Career ==
Sabatino first gained fame as the evil Chip Roberts/Tony Fenice on the prime-time soap Knots Landing from 1982 to 1983. He appeared as villain Lawrence Alamain on Days of Our Lives for three years from September 1990 until October 1993. After leaving Days of Our Lives, he joined The Bold and the Beautiful as entrepreneur Anthony Armando from November 1993 to July 1995 and December 2006. He then played the evil Dr. Jonathan Kinder on All My Children from September 1995 until November 1996.

Sabatino also portrayed the role of sleazy tabloid editor J. T. Cornell from May to July 2006 on Passions. Cornell figured prominently in the Passions "Vendetta" storyline as Theresa Lopez-Fitzgerald sought him out in the hopes he would prove to Ethan Winthrop that his wife Gwen outed his true paternity. On October 5, 2006, Sabatino reprised the role of J. T. Cornell, as part of the "Passions Tabloid Truth" online mystery. The storyline ended with Cornell being killed off.

Sabatino plays in the web series Venice: The Series alongside Chappell. He also wrote the song used in the funeral episode.

In September 2024, Chappell announced that Sabatino had been diagnosed with Parkinson's disease.

== Awards ==
- In 1993, he was nominated for the Soap Opera Digest Award for Outstanding Villain/Villainess for his Days role.
  - In 2000 he received a Drama Desk award for his work in the play "COBB", produced by Kevin Spacey
