= Olivia Spencer and Natalia Rivera Aitoro =

American Soap Opera Couple

Crystal Chappell as Olivia (left) and Jessica Leccia as Natalia (right).

Olivia Spencer and Natalia Rivera Aitoro, often referred to by the portmanteau Otalia, are a fictional couple from the American CBS daytime drama Guiding Light. Olivia is portrayed by Crystal Chappell, and Natalia is portrayed by Jessica Leccia.

The storyline begins when Olivia and Natalia's relationship starts to evolve following Olivia's heart transplant in April 2008. The couple's relationship subsequently changes from being enemies, to close friends who rely on each other, to women becoming more than friends.

Writing for the pairing was slow to establish the relationship as romantic. Despite this, the couple generated significant interest, not only amongst Guiding Light viewers but also amongst soap opera critics, LGBT-oriented websites such as AfterEllen.com and The Advocate, and mainstream media such as Entertainment Weekly. The pairing became one of the most praised same-sex couples in American daytime drama. Nelson Branco of TV Guide Canada named them 2009's "Sexiest Couple Alive," called the pairing a "fledgling super-couple," and wrote, "In an age of contrived and soulless couples, Olivia and Natalia’s burgeoning romance felt natural, innocent, and most importantly, real."

On April 1, 2009 (despite that date's usual connotations), CBS announced that the 72-year-old production of Guiding Light would cease broadcast on the network after September 18, 2009, effectively ending any long-term plans for the pairing.

== Background ==
=== Writing ===
In a BuzzWorthy Radio interview conducted on February 27, 2009, Crystal Chappell stated that in January 2008 Guiding Light Executive Producer Ellen Wheeler informed her and Leccia of the decision to proceed with the Olivia and Natalia story. In an AfterEllen.com interview released on March 1, 2009, Chappell stated that, "My EP (Wheeler) sat me down and told me that they were going to tell a story about two women who grow to depend on and love each other." Additionally, in an interview in Soap Opera Digest, Chappell notes the collaborative effort of the writing team, but also credits Wheeler and Co-Head Writer Jill Lorie Hurst with giving the love story extra personal attention. In the interview, Chappell states: "the rest of the writers are involved as well, but it's the two ladies [Wheeler and Hurst] who give the great female perspective and they actually read the lines back and forth to each other."

The writers scripted a passionate relationship between Olivia and Natalia. At first, their relationship was one of mutual animosity. Eventually, the audience saw their relationship grow into one of mutual respect and support. The essence of their relationship is their deep, firm, and abiding love for each other and for their family.

Tiffany D'Emidion of the Internet magazine EclipseMagazine lauded the writing staff for creating a story that has a "very natural flow and hasn’t fallen into the trap of forcing an unbelievable situation to further a mediocre storyline with the desperate hopes of boosting ratings."

Olivia and Natalia are often seen arguing passionately but also working through their problems together. They are shown to "call each other out" on their motivations and on their self-imposed limitations. Olivia uses sarcastic humor when communicating with Natalia, until Natalia points this out. Natalia is characterized as wanting to work within "the system". Olivia wants to fight the system. Natalia has faith; Olivia wants to find faith. Despite their differences, the emotional bond between the pairing consists of tender moments. The writers have initiated what is considered a love story between the two women.

=== Actresses' approach ===
Chappell and Leccia expressed enthusiasm for the opportunity to explore different types of love and relationships. Chappell stated, "I thought it was a story that I had never done before on television and as an actress it was exciting to think about, exploring all kinds of love that exist." Additionally, Leccia has stated, "I really loved the idea of building some kind of friendship or relationship or whatever you want to call it from something so unlikely, and to establish a relationship with another woman rather than possibly become some sort of man chaser."

Chappell and Leccia have been praised for their "impeccable" acting which, along with their on-screen chemistry, has been credited with making Olivia and Natalia a believable same-sex couple. J. Bernard Jones of the Internet site Daytime Confidential acknowledged the enthusiasm of fans for Olivia and Natalia and the chemistry between them by stating, "It's no secret that the potential romantic pairing of Olivia & Natalia has many GL fans buzzing with joy and for good reason. What fans are responding to is the fact that the chemistry between Crystal Chappell (Olivia) and Jessica Leccia (Natalia) is off the charts!"

== Storyline ==
=== The Heart of Gus Aitoro ===
Olivia and Natalia's love story starts with the death of Gus Aitoro (Ricky Paull Goldin). His death is an indirect result of Olivia and Natalia fighting for Gus's love and attention. Gus is Olivia's supportive friend while she suffers from a fatal heart condition for which a heart transplant is the only means of survival for Olivia. His newlywed bride Natalia, who is also his long lost high school sweetheart and mother of his teenage child Rafe (E.J. Bonilla), feels guilty about having played a part in Olivia missing her first opportunity for a heart transplant.

On April 1, 2008 Gus dies at Cedars Hospital from injuries sustained in a motorcycle crash. A heart becomes available for Olivia and Gus drives recklessly trying to find Olivia. After Gus's death, it is determined that his heart is a match for Olivia. Natalia does not want Olivia to get his heart because she thinks he died because of Olivia. But then Natalia sees Olivia's young daughter Emma (Jacqueline Tsirkin) and decides Emma should not be motherless. So, despite her hatred for Olivia, Natalia makes the incredibly difficult decision to give Olivia his heart.

After the transplant, when Olivia finds out that she is alive because Gus died, Olivia becomes angry and depressed. The guilt over the transplant, the grief over Gus's death, and the pain from the surgery all combines to put Olivia in an extremely despondent state. She does not want to live.

Being a housekeeper at the Beacon affords Natalia the opportunity to nurse the despondent Olivia. Though Natalia still hates Olivia, she decides to try to force Olivia to recover from her transplant surgery because she wants to keep Gus' heart alive. However, Natalia's goodwill is tested by Olivia's cruel actions and words. Despite Olivia's cruel behavior, Natalia declares her determination to keep Olivia alive. Because of Natalia's determination, after many bitter confrontations with Natalia, Olivia begins to recover from the transplant and decides to take care of Gus' heart.

=== Olivia's Sacrifice ===
As the seasons change from spring to summer, Olivia and Natalia begin to forge their own unique friendship. Their friendship centers around both of them trying not only to heal from Gus's tragic death but to deal with the resulting ramifications. Olivia and Natalia are drawn closer because of Rafe's suffering over the loss of Gus and the troubles caused by his actions. After Rafe accidentally shoots District Attorney Jeffrey O'Neill (Bradley Cole), Natalia asks Olivia for money so that Natalia can travel to find Rafe. Olivia decides to help Natalia.

By the fall, Olivia and Natalia are drawn ever closer because of Rafe's return to Springfield. Rafe is arrested and sentenced to two years in prison. Olivia is supportive of Natalia during this trying period. Olivia and Natalia also grow more dependent on each other. They create an inseparable bond due to Olivia's worsening heart problems (a bout of heart rejection) and Natalia's worry over Rafe's safety in the maximum security prison. Because Olivia's frail health is deteriorating, Natalia helps Olivia to fulfill her duties as the owner of the Beacon Hotel and also as the high-profile spokesperson for Galaxy Hotels – an international hotel chain run by the savvy businessman named Larry Decker (Tom Wiggin). Olivia is determined to fulfill her duties without Decker knowing she is ill.

One day in October 2008, Olivia suffers cardiac arrest. As Remy (Lawrence Saint-Victor) attempts to resuscitate Olivia, Natalia pleads to Olivia to stay alive for not only the sake of her children but for Natalia. Remy eventually resuscitates Olivia and she receives a pacemaker. Despite the pacemaker, Olivia continues to weaken. Yet, even in her weakened state, Olivia tries to solve Natalia's problems.

Just days after her pacemaker procedure, Olivia physically confronts the prison warden over Rafe being beaten by the other inmates. Later, Olivia works out a deal with the governor where he purchases Natalia's house for above market value so he can complete a transportation project. Also, Rafe being transported to the minimum security prison is part of the transaction.

And most difficult of all, Olivia tries to convince Decker to return to Natalia the $80,000.00 (the money from the house sale) that Natalia loses when she invests the money in Decker's risky hedge fund scheme. Natalia invests her money in the risky scheme because she overhears Olivia and Decker discussing the risky scheme. Olivia blames herself, and Frank (Frank Dicopoulos) also blames her, for Natalia investing her money in the hedge fund. Olivia makes what Decker calls “an impassioned” plea for him to return Natalia her money.

Olivia's impassioned plea to Decker drains her strength. She is admitted into the hospital. While in the hospital, Decker confronts a bed-ridden Olivia. Decker says he will return Natalia's money, but only if Olivia publicly resigns her position with Galaxy and then publicly acknowledges that she deceived Decker concerning her medical problem. For Natalia's sake, Olivia reluctantly accepts Decker's demand and the public humiliation.

In December 2008, Natalia uses her freshly returned money to buy the farmhouse which she has wanted to own. When Olivia gives Natalia the check from Decker, Natalia quickly realizes that Olivia has made a huge sacrifice on her behalf. Natalia surmises that Decker found out about Olivia's illness and forced her to resign as part of the deal for Natalia to receive her money. Wanting to own the house and to help Olivia, Natalia convinces Olivia to move herself and Emma into the farmhouse while Olivia recovers from her heart problems. In a joyous moment, Olivia agrees.

=== "My Two Mommies" ===
The new family moves onto the farm and into the farmhouse. Olivia and Natalia find it difficult to live together because of their different lifestyles. Being a devout Catholic, Natalia has religious symbols, such as crosses and statues. Olivia is not religious. On Christmas day, Natalia convinces Olivia to stay despite their differences and bickering.

The family is still basking in the joy of their home life when Emma is given a school project about what makes her family unique. Emma decides to make her presentation on her two mommies. Olivia and Natalia are unaware as to the subject of the presentation because Emma insists on it being a surprise. The presentation is revealed to them when Emma presents it to the crowd of children and parents at the Family Day school presentation.

Olivia quickly realizes that people construe “the two mommies” to mean that she and Natalia are lesbian lovers. Seeing the presentation through her own naïve eyes and also wanting to see it from Emma's innocent perspective, Natalia does not understand the inferences being drawn from Emma's presentation. Olivia tries to explain the inferences to Natalia; however, she is unable to say “lesbians” and skirts the issue by using ambiguous terms. Finally, after Natalia still does not comprehend the meaning, Olivia impulsively kisses Natalia to make her understand the inference. It works. Natalia then understands the lesbian inference. The kiss, however, unsettles the both of them.

In the aftermath of Emma's school presentation, Olivia realizes that she indeed has romantic feelings for Natalia. Natalia, concerned with public perception and her religious beliefs, is having problems facing her feelings for Olivia. Instead, Natalia tries to date Frank Cooper, a man infatuated with Natalia, but someone that Natalia considered only as a friend prior to Olivia's kiss.

In the following few months, Olivia and Natalia engage in a figurative dance over their burgeoning romantic feelings. Olivia deals openly with her romantic feelings toward Natalia by discussing them with several people in town, including the closeted lesbian mayor of Springfield Doris Wolfe. Olivia even attempts to verbalize these feelings to Natalia, but Natalia foils Olivia's attempts.

Natalia has a difficult time facing her romantic feelings for Olivia because of her religious beliefs and her value system. Nonetheless, Natalia continues to spend time with Olivia, especially in dealing with Olivia's fears over the return to Springfield of Olivia's ex-husband/Emma's father Phillip Spaulding (Grant Aleksander). The two women grow closer while the tension between them worsens over their unspoken romantic feelings.

=== Natalia's Confession ===
As a result of her confused feelings for Olivia, Natalia has a sexual encounter with Frank, and immediately regrets it. She prays to her Virgin Mary statue to help her deal with her confusing feelings. An extremely distraught and sobbing Natalia tells Olivia that she slept with Frank and she does not know why because she does not love him.

Frank proposes to Natalia. Natalia spends many weeks debating the decision. Then one day when Olivia is lightly sedated following a pacemaker procedure, Natalia tells the sedated Olivia that Olivia makes her happy. Natalia kisses Olivia on the forehead and then moves in for a kiss. Olivia awakens and in doing so, stops the near kiss.

After the near kiss, Olivia is concerned about acting on her feelings for Natalia. Olivia vents her fears to Mayor Doris Wolfe. Olivia is afraid to lose her heterosexual identity and to subject Natalia and Emma to potential ridicule by others. Olivia goes to the farmhouse and tells Natalia that she should marry Frank.

Natalia accepts Frank's proposal. The wedding occurs shortly thereafter. Prior to the wedding, at Gus' graveside, a visibly distraught Olivia is forced by Natalia to tell her why Olivia is so upset. Olivia screams through her sobs that she is in love with Natalia. Despite an emotionally intimate moment after Olivia's declaration of love, Olivia convinces Natalia that marrying Frank is best because Natalia deserves a better life than Olivia thinks she could provide her.

At the wedding altar, with Olivia as her Maid of Honor, Natalia is unable to say her vows to Frank, and flees the church. Olivia finds Natalia and tries to get her to return to the wedding. Natalia refuses as she declares that she cannot marry Frank because she does not love him - she loves Olivia.

Natalia is unable to tell Frank why she did not marry him. Olivia intercedes and blames it on Natalia's lingering grief over Gus. Frank accepts this explanation and agrees to give Natalia space. Later, Olivia tells Natalia that she is ashamed of her feelings for Olivia. Olivia walks away from Natalia after saying they have no relationship because someday Natalia will regret loving her and Olivia is unable to live with that prospect.

=== A Love Supreme ===
In the aftermath of the failed wedding, Natalia convinces Olivia that she understands the consequences of her declaration of love and that she wants a relationship with Olivia. The two women are trying to establish their relationship by dating and spending time with each other.

The newness and challenges of the relationship (not to mention the ongoing dramas of Springfield!) keep their progress on a "Two Steps Forward, One Step Back" trajectory, however. More often than not, it is Olivia who initiates the two steps forward, with Natalia's doubts pushing back (or at least slowing things down). Nevertheless, in the first six weeks following the Wedding That Wasn't, Olivia and Natalia have grown more comfortable with each other, gradually letting others in on their changed status (Olivia to Jeffrey: "Friends...and a little bit more" 5-22-09). They have frequently received a (dubious) assist in this regard, from Mayor Wolfe (who informs Natalia's ex-fiancé Frank about their relationship, before Natalia can do it herself). Notably, after he guessed, Natalia confirmed to her priest, Father Ray, that Olivia is indeed the "Someone Else" who ended her engagement to Frank. In so doing, Natalia made a signal break in letting the opinions of others (the Roman Catholic Church) define her own morality (which nevertheless remains strongly grounded in her personal faith).

As both Olivia and Natalia are mothers, each remains strongly concerned with how to explain their new (coupled---more or less!) relationship to their children. Olivia has visited her older daughter (out-of-state, and offscreen), Ava, but it has not been stated whether or not she was informed of her mother's changed relationship to Natalia. More immediately pressing, is how to tell the two children in Springfield: Natalia's 19-year-old son Rafe (freshly released from prison), and Olivia's 8-year-old daughter, Emma (who, with the "My Two Mommies" project behind her, may be the most instinctively supportive member of the family).

In all their struggles, however, Olivia and Natalia seem entirely resolved to face their challenges together. As they do so, consciously or not, they seem to be evermore drawn to each other on a physical level, in ways both tender and flirtatious: increasingly expressing that they are in love.

== Reception and impact ==
As Olivia and Natalia's relationship grew deeper, the storyline garnered critical praise from the soap press for being a well-crafted and "superbly performed" storyline that is addressing lesbian relationships and internalized homophobia. Additionally, viewers invested in the Olivia and Natalia storyline and the couple became popular.

In October 2008, controversy in the media arose over the future development of Olivia and Natalia's relationship. Rumors surfaced that the two would develop into a lesbian relationship. Later that month, a CBS publicist stated that "this is not going to be a gay story line", but would be a "deep, rich, emotional relationship that will be very unusual for soaps." In her BuzzWorthy Radio interview conducted on February 27, 2009, Chappell provided insight into the "gay" controversy when she stated, "our intention from the very beginning was not to throw labels out there. It narrows the scope of what we could do. We just wanted to tell a love story." Since October 2008, the controversy has subsided because Olivia and Natalia's story has progressed enough toward romance that members of the media have considered them to be a budding lesbian couple.and SheWired.com, Nelson Branco of the Internet website TV Guide Canada refers to their relationship as "romantic love".

In the Internet article, "Racial vs. Gay Diversity on Daytime Television", Herndon Davis analyzed gay and lesbian representation on daytime television. Part of Davis's article focused on the late-in-life same-sex romance developing between Olivia and Natalia. In addressing the potentially broad cultural impact of their relationship, Davis quoted Jamey Giddens, the editorial director for Daytime Confidential:

Guiding Light's Olivia and Natalia are off to a good start, as two women who once battled over the same man have managed to find common ground in their love for Olivia's daughter and their joint attempts to rebuild their lives. If the storyline isn't derailed, it could prove to be one of the most fascinating explorations of love, friendship and sexuality, not just in daytime, but in television as a whole.

Charlie Mason and Dustin Cushman from Soaps She Knows put Natalia and Olivia on their list of Daytime's Groundbreaking LGBTQ+ Characters and Couples saying that the couple "became very popular due to their chemistry".

== See also ==
- List of supercouples
