= Thomas Forrester =

Fictional character

- The Bold and the Beautiful character
- Matthew Atkinson as Thomas Forrester
- Portrayed by: Patrick Dorn (2002–2003); Drew Tyler Bell (2004–2010); Adam Gregory (2010–2014); Pierson Fodé (2015–2018); Matthew Atkinson (2019–present); (and child actors)
- Duration: 1998–present
- First appearance: January 7, 1998
- Introduced by: Bradley Bell
- Crossover appearances: The Price Is Right
In-universe information
- Other names: Thomas Hamilton Forrester
- Occupation: Businessman; Fashion designer
- Family: Forrester; Marone
- Father: Ridge Forrester
- Mother: Taylor Hayes
- Stepmother: Brooke Logan
- Sisters: Steffy Forrester; Phoebe Forrester
- Half-brothers: R.J. Forrester
- Spouse: Gabriela Moreno (2005); Hope Logan (2019)
- Sons: Douglas Forrester
- Grandfathers: Massimo Marone; Jack Hamilton
- Grandmothers: Stephanie Forrester; Sharon Ashford Hamilton
- Uncles: Thorne Forrester; Zachary Hamilton; Nick Marone
- Aunts: Felicia Forrester; Kristen Forrester; Angela Forrester; Diana Carter
- Nephews: Hayes Finnegan
- Nieces: Kelly Spencer
- First cousins: Alexandria Forrester; Zende Dominguez; Dino Damiano; Jack Marone

Thomas Forrester is a fictional character from The Bold and the Beautiful, an American soap opera on the CBS network. Created and introduced by Bradley Bell, the role has been portrayed by multiple child actors. In 2004, the role was rapidly aged with actor Drew Tyler Bell, who remained in the role until 2010. That same year, Adam Gregory was cast in the role, who remained until 2014. The following year, Pierson Fodé was cast in the role. Fodé departed the role in September 2017 and returned for a one-month guest stint from March to April 2018. In February 2019, it was announced that Matthew Atkinson had been cast in the role; he debuted the following month when Thomas returned to Los Angeles. He exited the role in July 2024, when Thomas moved to France with Paris (Diamond White). Atkinson reprised the role in 2025 in a guest capacity when Thomas returned in September and December.

Thomas is the son of supercouple Ridge Forrester (Ronn Moss/Thorsten Kaye) and Taylor Hayes (Hunter Tylo/Krista Allen/Rebecca Budig). He has two sisters, Phoebe (MacKenzie Mauzy) and Steffy (Jacqueline MacInnes Wood) and a half-brother, R. J. Forrester (Anthony Turpel/Joshua Hoffman) from his father's marriage to Brooke Logan (Katherine Kelly Lang).

Drew Tyler Bell won the Daytime Emmy Award for Outstanding Younger Actor in a Drama Series in 2010, for his portrayal of Thomas. Fodé's portrayal later earned him two consecutive nominations, in 2017 and 2018, for the same category.

== Character creation ==
=== Casting ===
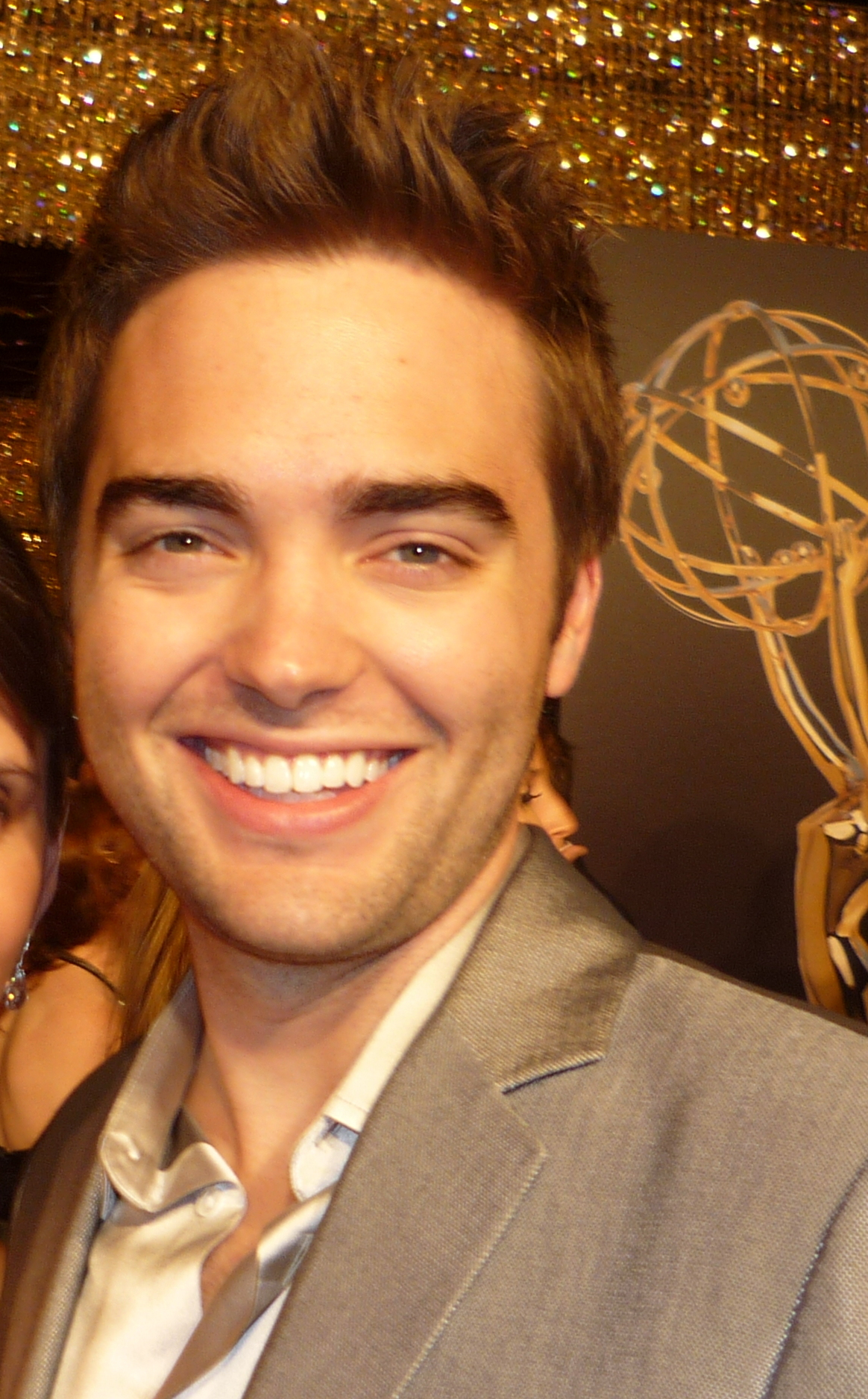
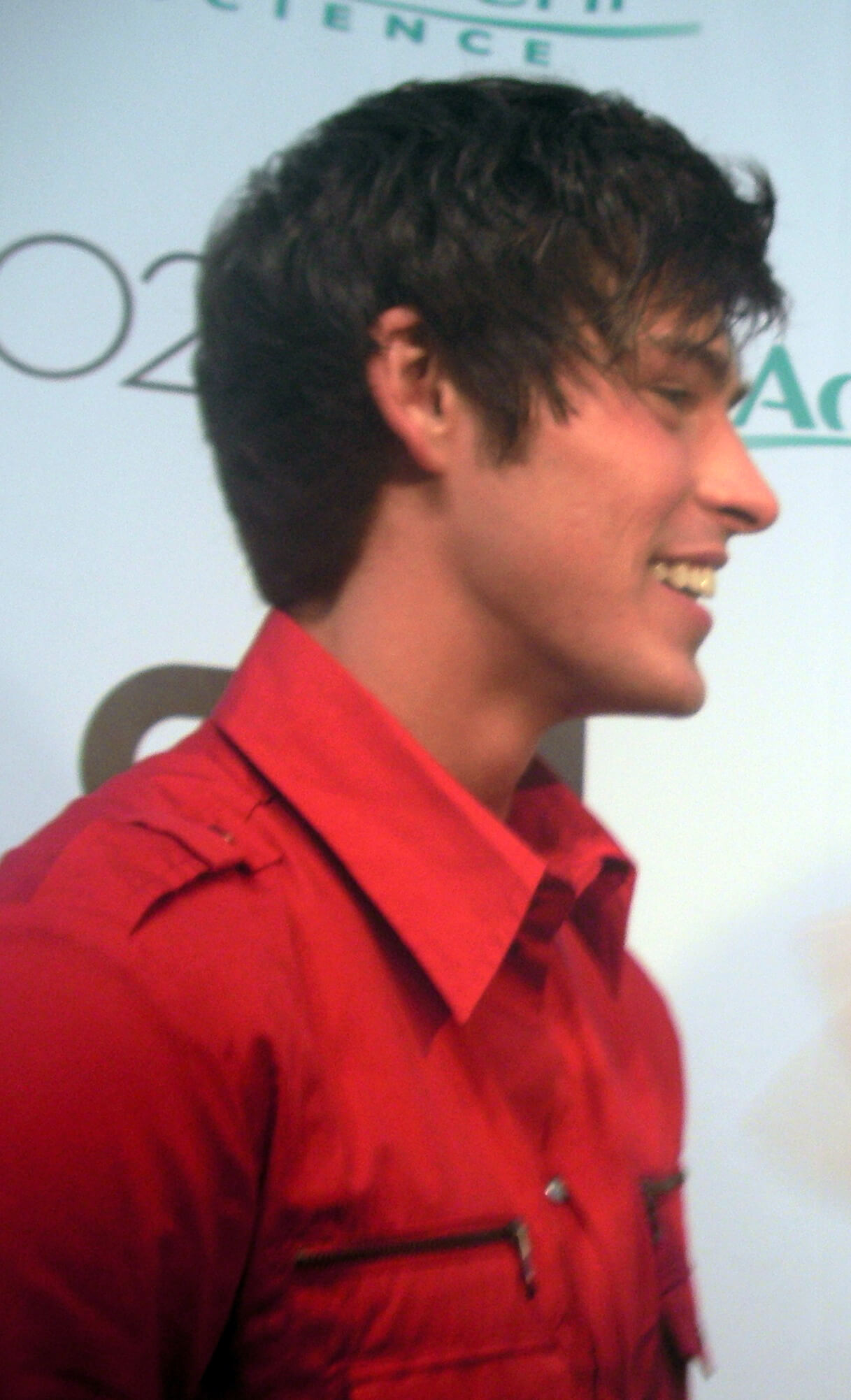
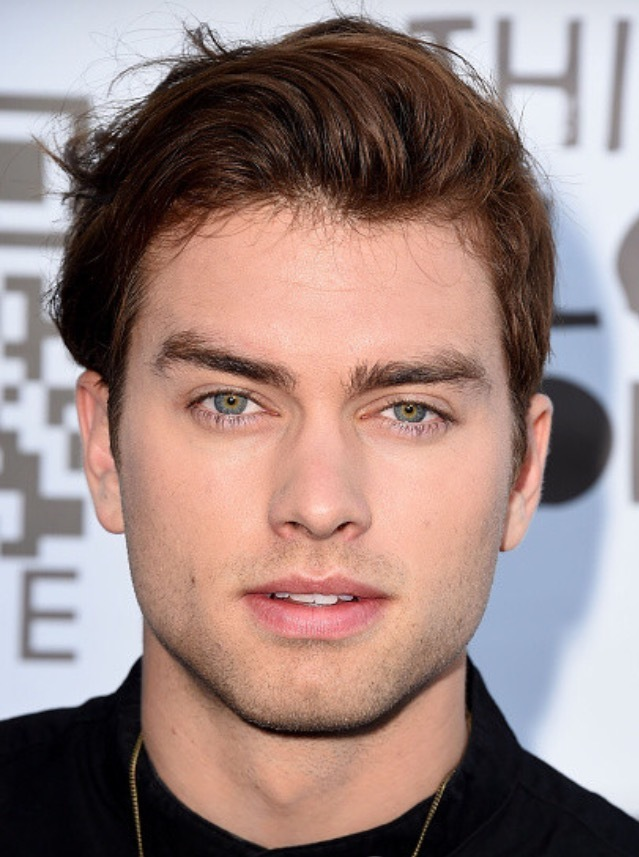
From left to right: Actors Drew Tyler Bell, Adam Gregory, and Pierson Fodé have each portrayed the role of Thomas Forrester since the character's debut in 1998.

Between 1998 and 2001, the character of Thomas was played by various child actors. From January 15, 2002, to August 4, 2003 (on a recurring basis), child actor Patrick Dorn was the first non-twin child actors duo to play Thomas. From 2004 to 2005, Drew Tyler Bell began playing Thomas on a contract. He shifted to a recurring character from 2005 to 2009, and was on contract from 2009 to 2010. He won a Daytime Emmy Award for Outstanding Younger Actor in a Drama Series in 2008. In 2010, it was announced that Drew Tyler Bell had been dropped from the part, and that Adam Gregory was to take over the role. In December 2013, following Gregory's decreased screen time and removal from the opening credits, fans began to speculate that Gregory was let go from the series. Gregory and a rep for the series confirmed he was dropped to recurring to pursue other acting jobs. A rep for the series confirmed, "Adam is recurring. [...] And, he has more scenes to tape later this week." In May 2015, it was confirmed that Gregory was no longer in the role, and a casting call seeking a "handsome, tall, Caucasian man in his 20s with a great physique" to play Thomas was released. In June 2015, it was announced that Pierson Fodé would join the cast in the role of Thomas. Fodé made his debut on July 27, 2015. On September 7, 2017, Soap Opera Digest announced that Fodé would depart the role of Thomas. He last appeared on September 13, 2017. On February 16, 2018, it was announced that Fodé would reprise his portrayal of Thomas for a short-term storyline; he appeared in episodes between March 9 and April 5, 2018.

On February 11, 2019, it was announced Matthew Atkinson had been cast in the role, and made his first appearance on March 15, 2019. Speaking on his casting, Atkinson told Soap Opera Digest: "It was actually a long time coming. I remember this role coming around a few years ago. When it came around this time, [having worked at Y&R], I knew everyone there. I had met Brad [Bell, executive producer/head writer] before, and I couldn't say no ... There's something very comforting now about being back in the same building." Atkinson exited the role on July 11, 2024; on April 18 of the following year, Atkinson's name was removed from the serial's end credits. That August, it was announced he would reprise the role; his return aired on September 2, 2025. The following month, it was revealed he was back on set.

=== Characterization ===
The character is described "As the extremely attractive and charming heir of Forrester Creations" and "this wide-eyed prodigy is a visionary and famed designer in the making, fully aware that the eyes of the fashion world, as well as every single girl in town, are fixated on his every move". There was brief speculation that the character was going gay; however this was never a storyline. Bell has stated that this new Thomas will become an exact replica of how his father Ridge Forrester was when he was a young playboy at the beginning of the show.

== Storylines ==
=== 1998–2003 ===
When Taylor Hayes, Thomas' mother, discovered the pregnancy, she attempted to tell Ridge Forrester the news. However once she saw him in bed with Brooke Logan once again she nearly lost the baby due to stress. Ridge's brother Thorne convinced Taylor the stress could harm her baby so Taylor told everyone Thorne was the father. Brooke discovered the truth but hid it and married Ridge again but shortly after Thomas' birth Taylor revealed the truth. She explained the reasons she went along with the deception. Ridge was furious with Brooke and Taylor for lying but faced a choice: honor his marriage vows and commitment to Brooke or raise Thomas with Taylor. Despite his love for Brooke, Ridge married Taylor. Thomas' childhood was far from easy, throughout his parents' marriage Taylor was constantly insecure about Ridge's love for Brooke. At a young age his sister Steffy was thought to be dead, however was kidnapped. Also, his mother, Taylor was presumed dead in 2002 after being shot by Sheila Carter defending Brooke. After Taylor's death, Brooke took over as parent for the children and married Ridge.

=== 2004–2013 ===
Thomas and Brooke end up in a plane crash when they go to promote the Taboo line overseas. They end up stranded, their bodies washed ashore. The whole family is extremely worried, and goes on an agonizing search across the seas for them. Brooke eats berries on the island after she and Thomas have gone two to three days without food and gives some to him. It caused them to have weird dreams and imagine themselves in an odd alternate world. Ridge comes to the rescue of Brooke and his son. Both Thomas and Brooke wonder what happened on the island, as they experienced strange feelings after eating the berries (they are both under the impression that they could have had sexual relations). Stephanie (always wanting to get rid of Brooke from the family) tells Thomas to lie to everyone and say that he and Brooke had sex on the island, so that Ridge would leave Brooke for Taylor. As Taylor and Ridge are about to get married, Stephanie and Thomas reveal the whole truth (which was eating Thomas alive). Thomas' girlfriend Dayzee (who encouraged him to tell the truth, knowing about the scandal) left him after that. The whole family finds it hard to forgive him, but Taylor does and blames Stephanie for the incident. Ridge and Brooke don't forgive Thomas for this, and move him to the Shipping Department of Forrester Creations. Thomas later begins a relationship with Hope Logan (his adoptive step-sister). She was previously in a relationship with Liam Spencer who is now married to his younger sister Steffy. They share a kiss and begin to date, and he proposes to Hope in Mexico where she briefly accepts by saying 'its too soon now, but maybe someday it will happen.' After Hope finds out that Thomas had been encouraged to date her by Steffy to keep Hope away from Liam, Hope breaks up with Thomas, leaving him hurt because he genuinely wanted to be with Hope.

Thomas meets the new designer at Forrester Creations, Caroline Spencer, whom Brooke had hired to set her up with Rick. However, Thomas catches Caroline's attention, and they go out on a date. They even kiss while they dance. Thomas and Caroline grow closer, and when she introduces him to her mother Karen, and Karen's partner Danielle, Thomas is at first surprised by Caroline's family situation but accepts it and supports it, which Caroline appreciates and they continue their relationship. Thomas and Caroline begin to get serious, even though Rick is interested in Caroline and intends to steal her away from Thomas. The relationship intensifies as they both spend more time together. However, Caroline is soon jealous of Thomas' ex-girlfriend Hope, who suddenly (thanks to Rick) is single. The chemistry between Hope and Thomas stirs up trouble for Caroline and Thomas' relationship, and Rick takes advantage by fueling Caroline's jealousy of Hope.

Thomas' mother Taylor begins an affair with Eric and uses this to get Eric to make Thomas Vice President. Rick is angered by this but Eric orders Rick to include Thomas on everything at Forrester Creations and to work with him despite their differences. Rick begins spending most of his time at Dayzee's with Maya. The first quarter numbers come in and they are terrible due to Rick's ideas. Rick is not present at the meeting and Thomas uses this to convince Eric to support Thomas' idea of going into new trends but during his presentation Brooke comes out in her lingerie and convinces Eric to relaunch the highly successful Brooke's Bedroom, which he does much to the dismay of Thomas, Steffy, and Taylor. Thomas was said to have joined Steffy, Taylor and Ridge in Paris during fall 2013.

=== 2015–2024 ===
Thomas (Fodé) returns in July 2015 to attend his cousin Aly's (Ashlyn Pearce) funeral and decides to stick around to support Steffy who is riddled with guilt being responsible for Aly's death. He wants to rejoin the design team at Forrester Creations but Ridge accuses him of not putting his all into his designs and wanting a handout because he is a Forrester. Meanwhile, Thomas questions Caroline's relationship with Ridge because of the dramatic age difference. Despite this, he continues to offer Caroline friendship. It all comes to a head when, after Ridge breaks up with Caroline, he comforts her and they sleep together; he is unaware that she has taken anxiety pills before drinking. Ridge then quickly calls Caroline back and they marry. Thomas then becomes a confidante of Steffy during her war against Ivy. Caroline learns she is pregnant, and is at first joyful, before Ridge tells her he had a vasectomy in Paris. Realizing that the baby must be Thomas', she tells Ridge about their night together, but defends him, refusing to believe he had taken advantage of her. Ridge, angry at what Thomas has done, including a fight over an affair Thomas had with an intern which led to a fight where Thomas punched him, forces Thomas to return to Paris, leaving Forrester employees baffled. He tells Caroline the baby is his and they decide to raise it together as theirs. He later returns after Caroline convinces Ridge to stop acting angry to keep Thomas from being suspicious about the baby. He does question the baby's lineage, but accepts Caroline's claim of Ridge. Afterwards, Ridge continues to make Thomas suspicious. Thomas turns his attentions to fighting the Spencers and pursues Ivy believing her to be someone his dad can't disapprove of. Her resolve slowly breaks following an incident at Pam's Halloween party where Thomas saves her from a falling light. During a thunder storm where only the two of them are in the Forrester Mansion, they begin an affair while Wyatt, her boyfriend at the time, is out of town on business.

Thomas (Atkinson) returns to Los Angeles with his son Douglas in 2019, following the sudden death of Caroline. He sets his sights on Hope as a potential replacement mother for Douglas, noting the rapport they share with each other. Thomas overhears a conversation that makes him wonder if Hope's daughter is alive. Thomas is able to persuade Hope to get married. When the truth finally comes out, Thomas goes into hiding and Hope pursues an annulment of their marriage. After learning that Hope has gone to the beach house, Thomas surprises her there and tries to apologize for what he has done. As Hope is trying to get away from Thomas, Brooke arrives and sees Hope struggling to break free from Thomas. Brooke comes between the two and pushes Thomas away, causing him to fall over the cliff. He is rushed to the hospital in a coma, but eventually regains consciousness. When Ridge confronts him about all that he has done, Thomas tearfully confesses and begs for forgiveness.

== Reception ==
In 2020, Candace Young from Soaps She Knows put Thomas on her list of the hottest soap opera villains, saying that the character "is definitely a bad boy with some anger issues. Manipulation, obsession, and scheming are his strong suits, but maybe he just wants to be loved. Several Los Angeles ladies' heads have been turned by Thomas, and it's no surprise what with his handsome face and four-alarm physique." In 2022, Charlie Mason from Soaps She Knows placed Thomas at 26th on his ranked list of The Bold and the Beautiful’s Best of the Best Characters Ever, commenting "Whether he was forbidden fruit (during Drew Tyler Bell's stint in the role), pretty, pretty eye candy (during Adam Gregory and Pierson Fode's) or a psycho for the ages (welcome aboard, Matthew Atkinson), Ridge and Taylor's son held our attention."
