= Caroline Spencer Forrester =

- The Bold and the Beautiful character
- Portrayed by: Joanna Johnson
- Duration: 1987–1990; 1992; 2001
- First appearance: Episode 1 March 23, 1987
- Last appearance: Episode 3460; January 5, 2001
- Created by: William J. Bell
In-universe information
- Occupation: Editor-in-chief of Eye On Fashion
- Family: Spencer
- Father: Bill Spencer
- Mother: Marion Bradley Spencer
- Sisters: Karen Spencer
- Half-brothers: Bill Spencer, Jr.
- Husband: Thorne Forrester (1987–1989); Ridge Forrester (1990)
- Nephews: Wyatt Spencer; Liam Spencer; Will Spencer
- Nieces: Caroline Spencer
- Other relatives: Kelly Spencer; Beth Spencer

Caroline Spencer Forrester is a fictional character from the American soap opera The Bold and the Beautiful. The role was played by Joanna Johnson from March 23, 1987, to July 19, 1990. She returned as a vision on June 11, 1992 and as a ghost on January 5, 2001. Johnson also plays Caroline's identical twin sister, Karen Spencer.

The character is introduced as a sweet and virginal young woman who becomes strong-willed and even self-serving as she is betrayed by the men in her life and by her best friend, Brooke; but she finds true compassion and selflessness as she dies from leukemia.

== Development ==
In February 1987, Johnson learned that William J. Bell was having trouble casting the role of Caroline in his new soap opera. She contacted her agent who helped arrange a reading for the part, which she secured. Before she was cast as Caroline, Johnson also read for the role of Brooke Logan, which eventually went to Katherine Kelly Lang. Caroline was introduced as the rich, nice and beautiful daughter of Bill Spencer (Jim Storm) and Ridge Forrester's (Ronn Moss) fiancée. However, shortly before the wedding, it emerges that Ridge has had an affair with Alex Simpson (Carla Herd). John N. Goudas from the Staten Island Advance observed that Caroline "somehow controls her disappointment", but then Ridge's brother Thorne Forrester (Clayton Norcross) confesses his love for her. Johnson told Goudas: "I don't think Caroline is going to marry either Ridge or Thorne." In addition to her romantic woes, Caroline is also desperate to leave her "drab apartment", where she is "slumming along".

== Storylines ==
Caroline Spencer first appeared as the daughter of publishing tycoon Bill Spencer, Sr. (Storm), engaged to the playboy fashion designer, Ridge Forrester (Moss), the son of Eric and Stephanie Forrester, who founded and run the prestigious Los Angeles design house where Ridge works. But Bill strongly disapproves of this match. Just before the wedding ceremony, Bill tells Caroline that he had Ridge followed and knows for a fact that he slept with another woman just a week before. She is nevertheless determined to go through with the wedding, but collapses on her way down the aisle. She is rushed to the hospital, where an idolizing young woman from the Valley, Brooke Logan (Lang), visits and befriends her. After she is released, she estranges herself from Ridge and moves into her own apartment.

Caroline is raped by a man named Ron Deacon (Greg Wrangler). The first person a distraught Caroline calls for support is Brooke. She eventually moves in with the Logans: Brooke and her siblings, Storm, Donna and Katie; and Brooke's mother, Beth. Ridge's brother, Thorne Forrester (Norcross), visits to comfort Caroline, even while Ridge himself knows nothing about what happened. By the time he finds out, Caroline has convinced herself she loves Thorne. During the trial, Ron's lawyer tries to destroy Caroline's reputation by insinuating that she consented to sex. Ridge takes the stand, testifying that Caroline was insistent on remaining a virgin until she was married. Ron ends up in prison.

Ridge writes Caroline a love letter, but Brooke conspires with Thorne to hide it. Caroline learns of their deception only after she weds Thorne, causing a rift in their marriage and in her friendship with Brooke, who is now dating Ridge. Her marriage is further undermined when a drunken Ridge tricks Caroline by slipping into her bed; but Caroline is also drunk and thinks it's Thorne (or pretends to herself that she thinks it's Thorne) and they have sex. When Thorne learns what happened, he gets drunk and shoots Ridge in the back of the head. Stricken with amnesia (caused by a mixture of the alcohol and sleeping pills), he forgets both Caroline's disloyalty and his shooting of Ridge; but Stephanie knows everything. She is terrified when she learns that Caroline plans to leave Thorne because she is certain it will trigger Thorne's memory, and he'll attack Ridge again. But Caroline is becoming assertive, and Stephanie's attempts to manipulate her fail. When she learns the truth of the shooting, she is all the more determined to leave Thorne. He eventually does remember the attempted murder (thanks not to Caroline, but to a devious schemer named Deveney Dixon) and nearly shoots Ridge again. The two brothers eventually reconcile, but Caroline's marriage is over.

Caroline is still married to Thorne when she realizes she never stopped loving Ridge. She is devastated when Brooke reveals she is pregnant by Ridge but determined to make her move on him when they announce their wedding date. Brooke has a miscarriage, which leaves Ridge to make a free choice between the two women. After spending some time alone, he chooses Caroline. Ridge and Caroline marry in January 1990. The two of them are happy for about six months.

Only six months into the marriage, Caroline is diagnosed with leukemia and has only months to live. She keeps her illness a secret, wanting to have as much unclouded happiness with Ridge as possible before she dies. Brooke, who ran Caroline's blood test, knows about the illness. She believes Ridge should know, too, and asks Caroline's oncologist, Dr. Taylor Hamilton-Hayes, to break the news to him. Caroline had already made it clear to Dr. Hayes that she did not want Ridge to find out, and Taylor relayed that information to Brooke and asked her not to tell Ridge. Determined to be there for Ridge, Brooke tells him anyway against Caroline's dying wishes. Ridge is devastated. As a sign of his everlasting love, he gives Caroline a charm bracelet, each charm representing the wedding anniversaries they will be missing.

In her final few weeks, she encourages Brooke and Ridge to spend time together. Caroline believes that only Brooke can console Ridge after her death and chooses her as his second wife. Meanwhile, Ridge divulges Caroline's illness to his family and to Bill, who is particularly devastated. Ridge's sister, Felicia, throws a party for Caroline, who uses it as an opportunity to send a message to those she loves. She matches the dancing couples according to how she thinks they should be matched in their lives. She pairs up Stephanie and Eric (who is involved with Brooke) and pairs up Brooke and Ridge. Everyone knows she is dying, but Caroline doesn't know they know. While dancing with her ex-husband, Thorne, she collapses. Ridge carries Caroline to their house. They read the Bible together, and she dies in his arms.

Before her death, Caroline tells Brooke and Ridge they should reunite after she is gone; but Brooke is set to marry Eric, whose child she had just delivered. Ridge fell in love with Taylor, and ends up marrying her.

=== Caroline's twin sister ===
When Joanna Johnson returned to the show, she did so as Caroline's identical twin sister, Karen, who originally went by the name of Faith Roberts. This twin sister had never been mentioned previously, and a new background story was created for her. She was kidnapped as an infant and whisked away to Texas, where her parents never found her. Taylor's ex-husband, Blake Hayes, finally discovered her and used her to lure Ridge away from Taylor, with whom he wanted to reunite. The plot failed; but Karen stayed in town and provided the impetus for more storylines, including one in which she and Thorne fell in love. Johnson left the show again later, but she has returned many times to play Karen and even once to play Caroline's ghost.

== Reception ==
John N. Goudas of the Staten Island Advance branded the Caroline, Ridge, and Thorne love triangle "provocative" and noted that it seemed to be popular with viewers.

In 2022, Charlie Mason from Soaps She Knows placed Caroline 20th on his ranked list of The Bold and the Beautiful’s Best of the Best Characters Ever, commenting "You know a character has made a real impact when, as Joanna Johnson's virtuous one was, she was given a twin sister after being killed off and, years after that, a namesake niece to boot."
