= Olivia Spencer =

Fictional character

- Guiding Light character
- Portrayed by: Crystal Chappell
- Duration: 1999–2009
- First appearance: July 2, 1999
- Last appearance: September 18, 2009
- Created by: James Harmon Brown and Barbara Esensten
- Introduced by: Paul Rauch
In-universe information
- Other names: Olivia Lewis; Olivia O'Neill; Olivia Spaulding
- Occupation: Businesswoman
- Parents: Gregory Spencer; Rebecca Spencer
- Siblings: Marissa Randall; Sam Spencer
- Spouse: Joshua Lewis (2001–02); Alan Spaulding (2002–03); Phillip Spaulding (2004); Bill Lewis (2004–05); Jeffrey O'Neill (2008); Natalia Rivera Aitoro (2009–present)
- Sons: Rafael Rivera (stepson)
- Daughters: Ava Peralta; Emma Spaulding; Francesca Cooper (stepdaughter)
- Grandsons: Max Boudreau
- Nephews: Jonathan Randall (adoptive)

Olivia Spencer is a fictional character on the CBS daytime soap opera, Guiding Light. The character was introduced to audiences in the summer of 1999 as the fiancée of the late Prince Richard Winslow. Crystal Chappell originated the role and played it until the end of the series. For her portrayal, the actress was nominated five times (most recently, in 2010) for Outstanding Supporting Actress at the Daytime Emmy Awards, winning the award in 2002.

== Storylines ==
A native of the fictional island of San Cristobel, Olivia is the middle child of the late Gregory and Rebecca Spencer. The latter died of a stroke during an argument she was having with her daughter regarding her teenage pregnancy. She has and had two siblings: the eldest a sister, the late Marissa Spencer Randall, who was murdered by her husband, the late Alfred Randall, and her younger brother, Samuel Marcus "Sam" Spencer. She is also aunt to Alfred and Marissa's adoptive son, Jonathan Randall, and thus great aunt to his daughter, Sarah Randall. Olivia received Gus Aitoro's (Ricky Paull Goldin) heart to survive when he was killed on April 1, 2008. Before she was hospitalized, she set up a wedding to marry Gus but he declined. She married Jeffrey so she wouldn't be alone.

As a result of teenage rape, she gave birth to a baby girl in 1986. The baby was fathered by Jeffrey O'Neill, and placed for adoption right after birth. 20 years later Olivia discovered the woman she tried to kill, Ava Peralta, was actually her long-lost daughter. Through time and anguish, mother and daughter eventually forgave each other. Olivia also managed to forgive Jeffrey O’Neil for raping her, but not with ease. He apologized numerous times, and even said he would turn himself in. Ultimately, Jeffery did not have to do that. In time, all was forgiven. Jeffrey even agreed to marry her so she and her youngest daughter, Emma, would not be alone. Phillip Spaulding (Grant Aleksander) fathered Emma in 2003. The child was aged to age 8 in October 2008.

Olivia's (Crystal Chappell) longevity is attributed to the character's strong personality.

Following Gus's death, Olivia and Natalia Rivera (Jessica Leccia) become close, as Natalia wanted to feel close to Gus's heart and Olivia needed support to heal from her surgery. Olivia moves into Natalia's farmhouse, and Natalia became her assistant and helped care for Olivia's daughter Emma. When Olivia recovered, the two decided to remain roommates due to their extremely close friendship and for Emma's stability. In early 2009, the nature of their relationship was thrown into doubt when Emma made a school presentation discussing her "two mommies." Due to her naivete, Natalia didn't understand that the school faculty and other parents thought she and Olivia were lesbians, so Olivia pulled her best friend into a kiss to explain the insinuations about their relationships. In the following weeks, the two begin to question their feelings for each other and fight the romantic direction their relationship is taken.

Despite their attempts to deny the romantic attraction between them, Olivia and Natalia are each beginning their own personal journey toward realizing the romantic feelings that exists between them. Olivia has told several people in town that she feels more than friendship for Natalia. As part of her personal journey, Natalia prayed to the Virgin Mary to help her stop having "all these feelings". Natalia decides to accept Frank Cooper Jr. marriage proposal which forces Olivia to help plan a wedding she doesn't want to happen. Olivia declares her love for Natalia at Gus' grave site on the day of Natalia's wedding. Natalia runs out of the church during the ceremony. When Olivia finds her Natalia confesses her love for Olivia. After some hesitation they decide to move to the next step by taking a trip together, but Emma crashes the party.

Natalia found out she was pregnant in July, and she decided to go on a retreat. But she doesn't tell Olivia this. Olivia is left heartbroken and she feels unloved; she and Joshua Lewis (Robert Newman) were close to having sex three times while Natalia was away. When Natalia returned, she said she could no longer trust her and went into Josh's room and demanded sex so she could forget that she was in love with Natalia.

Olivia kept trying to deny that she still had feelings for Natalia because she could no longer trust her, but Natalia was determined to gain back her trust. Rafe puts all the blame of his mothers hurt on Olivia, but Natalia doesn't want any part in that; she wants her and Olivia to raise her and Frank Cooper's (Frank Dicopoulos) baby together. Olivia turns her down.

Finally, Olivia realized she loved Natalia too much to be mad at her, so she decided to give into her and Emma to move back into the farmhouse while Rafe is enrolled in the army.

On the Internet, the couple is referred to as Otalia.

== Reception ==
Charlie Mason and Dustin Cushman from Soaps She Knows put Natalia and Olivia on their list of Daytime's Groundbreaking LGBTQ+ Characters and Couples, saying that the couple "became very popular due to their chemistry".

== See also ==
- Olivia Spencer and Natalia Rivera Aitoro
