= Joanna Johnson =

American actress

- Born: December 31, 1961 (age 64); Phoenix, Arizona, U.S.
- Education: University of Southern California (1983)
- Occupations: Actress, writer, producer
- Years active: 1984–present
- Spouse: Michelle Agnew (m. 2008)
- Children: 2

Joanna Johnson (born December 31, 1961) is an American actress, writer, producer and director. She is best known for her popular roles as Caroline Spencer Forrester (1987–1990, 1992, 2001) and as her twin sister, Karen Spencer (1991–1994, 2009, 2011–2014), on the CBS daytime soap opera The Bold and the Beautiful.

Johnson continues to work actively also behind the camera in the entertainment show business, having several credits as writer, producer, showrunner and director.

She wrote the independent film The Shrink Is In (2001), after she created the ABC sitcom Hope & Faith (2003–2006) which ran for three seasons. She was co-executive producer on ABC Family's series Make It or Break It (2009–2012), Fairly Legal (2012), for USA Cable, and the CW's Emily Owens, M.D. (2012–2013). She is also the creator, executive producer and director of Freeform's limited series Love in the Time of Corona (2020). Previously, Johnson was the executive producer, showrunner and senior writer on Freeform's drama series The Fosters (2013–2018), and its spin-off Good Trouble (2019–2024), which both series ran for five seasons.

== Education ==
In 1983, Johnson graduated from the University of Southern California with a degree of English literature. She subsequently graduated from the USC Film School.

== Career ==
=== In front the camera: first roles as an actress ===
Joanna Johnson was born and raised in Phoenix, Arizona. She attended USC Film School and, after graduating, pursued an acting career. She started acting in small roles on television series such as Riptide, Mike Hammer (1984), and The Twilight Zone (1985). She had a first leading role in the terror movie Killer Party (1986).

The next year, she took a role as Caroline Spencer Forrester (1987–1990, 1992, 2001) on the CBS daytime, daily soap opera The Bold and the Beautiful. Joanna Johnson starred in the original cast in the early seasons of the long-running series alongside Ronn Moss, Susan Flannery, Katherine Kelly Lang, John McCook and many other actors. Her international popularity playing Caroline's role increased with the love triangle storylines between Caroline Spencer and Ridge Forrester, ending with the characters' wedding and Caroline's secret illness and death.

Johnson's came back starring months later as Caroline's twin sister, Karen Spencer (1991–1994, 2009, 2011–2014), role she played for four years more. She also reprised her role as Karen on The Bold and the Beautiful from April 28, 2009, to mid November 2009 and again from late-December 2000 to January 5, 2001. Johnson returned again as Karen Spencer role on July 22, 2011, and since March 28, 2012 she was on recurring status.

=== Behind the camera: writer, producer, show-runner and director ===
In 1993, she took a stab at the music industry with the album Standing In My Rain (1993). The record was published by Finnish label Sony Music Entertainment (Finland) Oy.

Johnson's primary focus is her career writing, producing and directing: She started as associate producer on the Peter Berg film, Very Bad Things (1998), starring Cameron Diaz and Jeremy Piven. She then wrote the independent film The Shrink Is In (2001) starring Courteney Cox and David Arquette, after she created the ABC sitcom comedy Hope & Faith (2003–2006) which ran for three seasons, starring Kelly Ripa and Faith Ford as sisters and also with Ted McGinley and Megan Fox.

Following the cancellation of Hope and Faith Johnson revealed in an interview with Gabrielle Winkel that she was working on other projects such as writing several episodes of the ABC Family show Make It or Break It (2009 – 2012) for which she also worked as co-executive producer. In 2012 she worked too as executive producer and writer of Fairly Legal, for USA Cable, and the CW's series Emily Owens, M.D. (2012–2013) starred by Mamie Gummer (Meryl Streep's daughter) in one of her firsts leading roles and by Justin Hartley.

In 2013, Johnson joined Peter Paige and Bradley "Brad" Bredeweg as executive producer and showrunner on Freeform's drama series The Fosters(2013–2018), which ran for five seasons.The series stars Teri Polo and Sherri Saum as gay parents Stef and Lena who have a multiethnic family kids, one biological, the others from the foster-care system. Johnson also did her debut as director of several episodes.

She is also the creator, executive producer and director of Freeform's limited series Love in the Time of Corona (2020). Since 2019 (just 7 months after The Fosters came to an end) Joanna Johnson started as executive producer and showrunner on Freeform's drama series Good Trouble (2019–2024), The Fosters spin-off, that was renewed for Season 5 at Freeform. Good Trouble is again created with Peter Paige and Bradley Bredeweg also. It starts by following The Fosters characters Callie (Maia Mitchell) and Mariana (Cierra Ramirez) that have grown and decided to move into a communal living space in Los Angeles. Both have a new job and intending to put careers above relationships.

Johnson not only worked again as the director of some Good Trouble episodes but, in 2019, she also did a guest role in as Diana, the mother of Callie's colleague Rebecca (Molly McCook). Her character Diana is the daughter of a United States Senator. She comes from a wealthy and powerful conservative family and has always been careful not to do anything that could negatively affect her family name and expects the same from Rebecca.

"We thought it would be fun if I played Rebecca's mother since I starred in the soap opera The Bold and the Beautiful with her [real] father [John McCook – Eric Forrester character]," Johnson said, adding "I think he convinced me I did the right path going behind the camera."

== Personal life ==
In May 2012, Johnson came out as gay during an interview with TV Guide. Having been in a relationship since 2003, Johnson married L.A. club promoter Michelle Agnew in 2008, during the four months same-sex marriage in California was recognized. They have an adopted son and an adopted daughter.
