= Crystal Chappell =

American actress (born 1965)

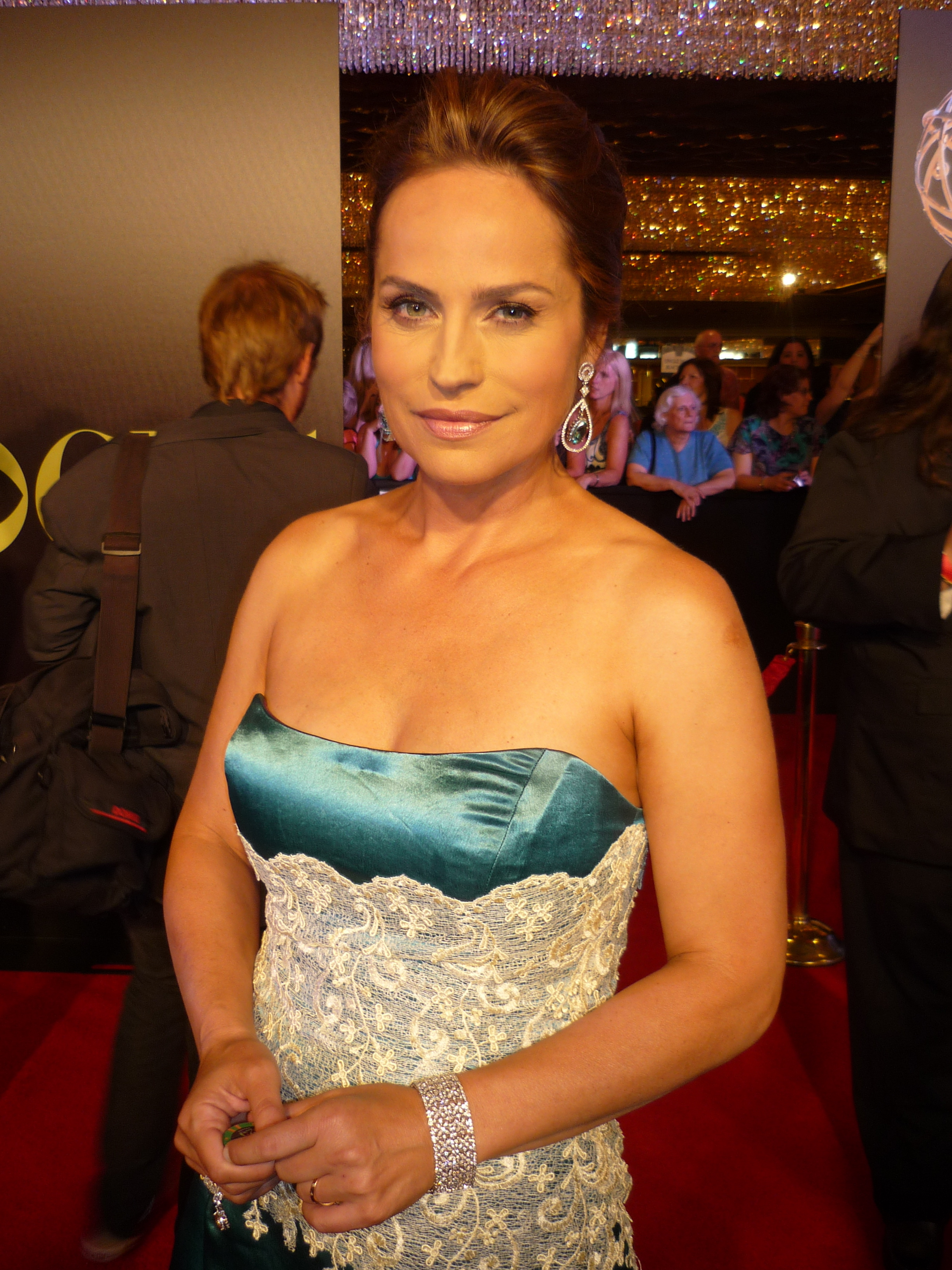
- Chappell at the 2010 Daytime Emmy Awards
- Born: Crystal Elizabeth Chappell; August 4, 1965 (age 61); Silver Spring, Maryland, U.S.
- Occupation: Actress
- Years active: 1989–present
- Spouses: Scott Fanjoy (m. 1988; div. 1991) Michael Sabatino (m. 1997)
- Children: 2

Crystal Elizabeth Chappell /ʃəˈpɛl/ (born August 4, 1965) is an American actress who played Carly Manning on Days of Our Lives from 1990 to 1993, Maggie Carpenter on One Life to Live from 1995 to 1997 and Olivia Spencer on Guiding Light from 1999 to 2009.

On October 2, 2009, she began reprising the role of Carly Manning. In May 2011, Chappell revealed that her contract was not renewed and her character ended its run in late summer. She has since appeared as Danielle Spencer on The Bold and the Beautiful in 2012 and 2013, as well as appearing in several online soap operas.

== Acting ==
=== Soap opera and serial roles ===
Chappell's first daytime appearance was as a day player on All My Children in 1989. In a July 2006 interview in industry magazine Soap Opera Digest, Chappell recalled actor Maurice Benard helping her through her first scenes. After a brief run on Santa Barbara in 1990, (she played a classmate of Eden's who died of an ice overdose), Chappell was cast as Dr. Carly Manning Alamain (Katerina von Leuschner) on Days of Our Lives. She portrayed the role from June 1990 to October 1993. Chappell and future husband Michael Sabatino met on Days of Our Lives, where he played villain Lawrence Alamain.

Chappell was front-burner for most of her time on the show, first when her character Carly was featured in a romance with lead character Bo Brady (Peter Reckell, Robert Kelker-Kelly), and then in a complex, Byzantine storyline that featured her heretofore unknown secret identity as a European blueblood. The story culminated in a controversial plot that had Carly buried alive by Lawrence's aunt Vivian (Louise Sorel). Chappell left after difficult contract negotiations and differences with head writer James E. Reilly.

Chappell's next role was as Maggie Carpenter on One Life to Live from October 1995 through September 1997. The character of Maggie was created for Chappell, and she was again paired with a romantic lead on the show, Max Holden (James DePaiva). Her main storyline revolved around the tension between her burgeoning romantic relationship and her plans to profess vows as a nun. The character was eventually written out.

From July 2, 1999, to September 18, 2009, she played complex villainess/anti-heroine Olivia Spencer on Guiding Light. The role of Olivia was initially only intended to be a short-term role, but Chappell's portrayal was so popular she was signed to a contract. She won a Daytime Emmy Award for Outstanding Supporting Actress in a Daytime Drama for her work as Olivia in 2002 and was nominated again in the same category in 2005 and 2006. In 2007, she earned her first nomination in the Outstanding Lead Actress category.

In 2009, her character Olivia and Jessica Leccia's character Natalia Rivera were involved in the hugely popular same sex pairing, "Otalia", which saw two presumably heterosexual women move from sworn enemies to a close friendship, to eventually, after a long period of dramatic angst, admitting their feelings towards each other and becoming a couple. The coupling of Otalia was embraced by fans and critics alike, and named a 'super-couple' by Nelson Branco, of TV Guide Canada and writes "In an age of contrived and soulless couples, Olivia and Natalia’s burgeoning romance felt natural, innocent, and most importantly, real." The final episodes of Guiding Light saw Natalia and Olivia move in and start a family together.

Chappell returned to her role on Days of Our Lives in September 2009 and begin airing in October.

In May 2011, her contract was not renewed and her character ended its run in late summer. Chappell joined the cast of The Bold and the Beautiful in 2012 as Danielle Spencer, who was featured in the show's first gay storyline.

In 2009, Chappell co-created the soap opera web series Venice: The Series. Chappell executive produces and stars in the series, which centers around the life of Gina (Chappell), a gay interior designer living in Venice Beach, California. Her Guiding Light former co-star Lecchia plays Gina's ex-girlfriend, Ani. In 2011, Chappell won the first Daytime Emmy Award for Outstanding Special Class Short Format Daytime as a producer, and won again in 2014 for Outstanding New Approaches - Drama Series. Chappell also produced and starred opposite Lecchia in a pilot for a new soap web series called The Grove in 2013.

In 2014, Chappell executive produced the soap opera web series Beacon Hill, and co-starred as Claire Preston.

She was nominated for a 2015 Daytime Emmy for Outstanding New Approaches Drama Series as a producer, and was nominated for a 2015 Indie Series Award for Best Supporting Actress (Drama) for her role. She will appear as Helena Granville-Belasco in the audio drama Montecito, beginning April 22, 2025.

=== Contract controversy ===
In 2005, Chappell was ambivalent about re-signing to Guiding Light, as her storyline had ebbed considerably. Shortly after re-signing her contract, she was offered the front-burner role of Paige on One Life to Live. Since Guiding Light had recently cut a number of its actors from the cast roster, Chappell met with the producers to see if she could be released from her contract with Guiding Light. The show ultimately refused. In a July 2006 interview with Soap Opera Digest, Chappell indicated that, while there were no hard feelings, she wasn't sure why the show was so eager to keep Olivia as a character, since the character had not been used much, particularly since the pairing of Olivia and Phillip ended. She has also made appearances in the prime time shows Poltergeist: The Legacy, Silk Stalkings, Pensacola: Wings of Gold, and Burke's Law.

== Personal life ==
Chappell was born in Silver Spring, Maryland, and later moved to the Annapolis, Maryland area and attended Arundel High School. She subsequently attended the University of Maryland, Baltimore County. She was married to Scott Fanjoy from 1988 to 1991. She has been married to actor Michael Sabatino since January 6, 1997. They have two sons, Jacob Walker (born May 11, 2000) and Dylan Michael (born September 2, 2003). Chappell has described herself as attracted to both men and women, and has spoken in support of equal rights for members of the LGBT community.

== Filmography ==
Film
Year	Title	Role	Notes
1992	One Stormy Night	Carly Manning	Television film
1993	Night Sins	Carly Manning	Television film
1994	Bigfoot: The Unforgettable Encounter	Samantha	
1994	Lady in Waiting	Elizabeth Henley	
2017	A Million Happy Nows	Lainey Allen	
2020	Stan the Man	Melody Dubois	
2020	Loco	Martha	

Television
Year	Title	Role	Notes
1989	All My Children	Nico's Nurse	Unknown episodes
1990	Santa Barbara	Jane Kingsley	5 episodes
1990–1993, 2009–2011	Days of Our Lives	Carly Manning	380 episodes Soap Opera Digest Award for Hottest Female Star; Nominated — Daytime Emmy Award for Outstanding Lead Actress in a Drama Series
1994	Diagnosis: Murder	Eve Laurie	2 episodes
1994, 1997	Silk Stalkings	Deborah Buchard; Bertha Roberts	2 episodes
1995–1997	One Life to Live	Maggie Carpenter	300 episodes
1995	Walker, Texas Ranger	Stacy	Episode: "Trust No One"
1995	Burke's Law	Marilyn Divine	Episode: "Who Killed the Movie Mogul?"
1998	Pensacola: Wings of Gold	Lieutenant Commander Keaton	Episode: "Trials and Tribulations"
1998	Poltergeist: The Legacy	Jessica Lansing	Episode: "Dream Lover"
1999–2009	Guiding Light	Olivia Spencer	999 episodes Daytime Emmy Award for Outstanding Supporting Actress in a Drama Series; Nominated — Daytime Emmy Award for Outstanding Supporting Actress in a Drama Series; Nominated — Daytime Emmy Award for Outstanding Lead Actress in a Drama Series (2007–2008)
2009–present	Venice: The Series	Gina	Main role
2012–2013	The Bold and the Beautiful	Danielle Spencer	Recurring role

== Awards and nominations ==
Year	Award	Category	Work	Result
1993	9th Soap Opera Digest Awards	Hottest Female Star	Days of Our Lives	Won
2002	29th Daytime Emmy Awards	Outstanding Supporting Actress in a Drama Series	Guiding Light	Won
2002	Online Film & Television Association Award	Best Supporting Actress in a Daytime Serial	Guiding Light	Nominated
2003	Online Film & Television Association Award	Best Supporting Actress in a Daytime Serial	Guiding Light	Nominated
2006	33rd Daytime Emmy Awards	Outstanding Supporting Actress in a Drama Series	Guiding Light	Nominated
2007	34th Daytime Emmy Awards	Outstanding Lead Actress in a Drama Series	Guiding Light	Nominated
2008	35th Daytime Emmy Awards	Outstanding Lead Actress in a Drama Series	Guiding Light	Nominated
2008	Online Film & Television Association Award	Best Actress in a Daytime Serial	Guiding Light	Nominated
2009	Gold Derby Award	Best Lead Actress - Daytime Drama	Guiding Light	Nominated
2009	Online Film & Television Association Award	Best Supporting Actress in a Daytime Serial	Guiding Light	Nominated
2010	Los Angeles Web Series Festival	Best Drama Series	Venice: The Series	Won
2010	Los Angeles Web Series Festival	Best Actress, Comedy or Drama Series	Venice: The Series	Won
2010	2nd Streamy Awards	Best Female Actor in a Dramatic Web Series	Venice: The Series	Nominated
2011	38th Daytime Emmy Awards	Outstanding Special Class - Short Format Daytime	Venice: The Series	Won
2011	2nd Indie Soap Awards	Best Lead Actress	Venice: The Series	Nominated
2012	39th Daytime Emmy Awards	Outstanding Lead Actress in a Drama Series	Days of Our Lives	Nominated
2012	3rd Indie Soap Awards	Best Lead Actress (Drama)	Venice: The Series	Nominated
2014	41st Daytime Emmy Awards	Outstanding New Approaches - Drama Series	Venice: The Series	Won
2015	42nd Daytime Creative Arts Emmy Awards	Outstanding New Approaches Drama Series	Beacon Hill	Nominated
2015	6th Indie Series Awards	Best Supporting Actress (Drama)	Beacon Hill	Nominated

== See also ==
- Olivia Spencer and Natalia Rivera Aitoro
