= John Finnegan (The Bold and the Beautiful) =

Fictional character

- The Bold and the Beautiful character
- Portrayed by: Tanner Novlan
- Duration: 2020–present
- First appearance: July 23, 2020
- Created by: Bradley Bell
In-universe information
- Other names: Finn (nickname); John Matthew Finnegan (full name)
- Occupation: Physician; Emergency physician
- Father: Jack Finnegan
- Mother: Sheila Carter
- Adoptive mother: Li Finnegan
- Half-brothers: Ryder Callahan
- Half-sisters: Mary Carter Warwick; Diana Carter; Daisy Carter
- Wife: Steffy Forrester (2021–present)
- Sons: Hayes Finnegan
- Daughters: Luna Nozawa
- Stepdaughters: Kelly Spencer
- Grandmothers: Molly Carter
- Aunts: Sarah Smythe; Poppy Nozawa (adoptive)
- Nieces: Lucy Romalotti
- First cousins: Greg Finnegan

John Finnegan is a fictional character from The Bold and the Beautiful, an American soap opera on the CBS network, portrayed by Tanner Novlan.

Created by executive producer and head writer Bradley Bell in 2020, Finn made his first appearance on July 23 of that year, and is introduced as the doctor who treats Steffy Forrester (Jacqueline MacInnes Wood) after she sustains injuries in a motorcycle accident and develops a dependency to her pain pills. In addition to the character's presence as part of an opioid addiction storyline, Finn evolved and became Steffy's love interest, subsequent to the pair meeting when she landed at the hospital, and both experiencing an immediate attraction to one another and, essentially, fell in love at first sight. Months later, Finn impregnates Steffy, the duo gets engaged, and then delivers their son, Hayes Finnegan, via home birth. They later marry one another in an intimate ceremony at the Forrester Estate.

Finn's birth mother is later revealed to be villainess Sheila Carter (Kimberlin Brown). He is the result of an extramarital liaison between Sheila and Jack Finnegan (Ted King), who was married to Finn's adoptive mother, Li Finnegan (Naomi Matsuda). Without the knowledge of Li and Finn, Sheila relinquished Finn as a newborn, and Jack orchestrated a covert adoption of his own biological son to safeguard the secrecy of his affair. Sheila attempted to establish contact with Finn on numerous occasions, but the majority of these efforts proved unsuccessful or disjointed due to Steffy's disapproval and Finn's reluctance.

TV Source Magazine acclaimed Finn as a "strapping young doctor" who infused "a breath of fresh air" to the show; Carly Silver from Daytime Confidential asserted that the character was a "good seed." Commonly referred to by the portmanteau "Sinn" in magazines, on social media and internet message boards, the pairing of Finn and Steffy attracted a large fan following. Novlan has gained popularity among viewers, with his introduction and performance in the role receiving much praise from both critics and audiences alike. So much so that when the actor briefly exited the role in April 2022, it sparked major controversy and a social media uproar. It was later revealed that Novlan had never actually left the role of Finn and he reappeared on screen the following month in late May.

== Creation ==
=== Casting ===
Novlan on audition process

I screen tested and did a chemistry read with Jacqui [Wood] I believe March 11 or 12, literally the day before all of the sports organizations like the NHL and the NBA and all of those seasons got canceled, when the pandemic really took a turn. It was literally the day before, so it was a pretty normal experience. It was really cool to meet [Wood] and play with her in the chemistry read and go back and forth.

— Novlan, Soapcentral.com (2021)

Tanner Novlan's daytime television debut and casting was exclusively reported by TVLine on July 9, 2020, alongside Delon de Metz's as a recast of Zende Forrester Dominguez. Novlan was previously known for appearing as "Struggling Actor" in a Liberty Mutual commercial and guest starring appearances on primetime series such as Modern Family, Mohawk Girls, Rizzoli & Isles, and Roswell, New Mexico. Soap Hub Soap Hub, Soaps In Depth, and Soap Opera Digest specified that Novlan, as John "Finn" Finnegan, was tapped to play Steffy Forrester's (Wood) potential love interest.

On June 17, 2020, after fourth months of hiatus due to the COVID-19 pandemic in the United States production shutdown, the series became one of the first American scripted television series to resume recording, although production went on a one-week hiatus to accommodate modifications to its protocols. With the accompanying news that the series would return with original episodes on July 20, 2020, Deadline Hollywood announced Novlan's first episodic appearance was slated to be July 23.

Novlan revealed he had secured the role back in March 2020 but had to keep it quiet due to the coronavirus shutdown. He explains that he "wasn't able to speak about it or tell anyone about it because we didn't know how long the shutdown was going to be." Novlan felt that he was in bit in a pickle due to the fact, that "my family, my mom especially, has been a life- long B&B fan. I mean, she loves the show. Our family dog's name was Thorne — with an e — so I remember ever since I was young hearing the theme song, hearing the storylines, so it was so exciting, and a real honor to be welcomed into that family." When speaking about the shooting method, Novlan, express that "I don't know their old way of filming, so this is my new normal," but "it's been such a unique process but it's been amazing how all the producers have come together to figure this out and put forth these groundbreaking guidelines, making things safe and efficient and being able to work around all of this and keep everything alive."

Novlan is married to Kayla Ewell, who previously portrayed Caitlin Ramirez. She returned to play an intimacy double or a stand-in (from September 2020 to March 2021) for Wood as a result of the onset protocols. Due to social distancing on set slowly coming to an end in the filming process, since May 2021, Novlan and Wood, began filming their own intimate scenes.

In April 2022, after nearly two years on canvas, it was announced Novlan had exited, after the show had decided to subsequently kill off Finn. He revealed to Soap Opera Digest that he, himself and alongside the entire cast, were "pretty surprised" in regards to his character's direction and most predominantly, co-star, Wood, who he described as rendered "speechless" due to the magnitude of the 'Sinn' fanbase.

Novlan re-appeared on the series in the episode dated May 23, when Finn was revealed to be alive, in a coma, to the viewers. On that same day, Novlan revealed during a segment of The Talk, that he had never actually left the series and had to keep Finn's resurrection a secret.

== Development ==
=== Characterization ===
"[Finn] has a giant heart, and he's ready to give it away. I think that's going to be exciting to explore, because he has always put work first. Potentially falling in love with a woman who has had complicated relationships is going to be an 48 interesting dynamic to explore."

— Novlan, Soap Opera Digest (2020)

On the conceptualization and significance of the character's name, particularly of "Finnegan", Bradley Bell reveals in TV Soap Australia, that the name was an inspiration taken from past cast members such as Finnegan George, who portrayed Will Spencer from 2018 to 2019 and Jennifer Finnigan, who had played the role of Bridget Forrester from 2000 to 2004. He also denotes that it honors "all the great 'Finnegans' we've been in touch with over the years" and that Bell admitted that he has "friends with the name Finn." He adds on that "it seemed to fit [Novlan] and its unique."

Bell describes Finn as a "young, accomplished, kind, handsome doctor." Bell continues in explaining that "he's a fresh new presence. Finn has some mystery to him." Novlan notes that Finn "is a helper. it's in his nature. He's a doctor. I think he can't help but fall for a girl like Steffy. He's got a big heart. Maybe too big. And I think sometimes that gets him into trouble." Carly Silver from Daytime Confidential called Finn a "good doctor" and a "good seed." Meanwhile, Soap Central described Finn as a "hot new doc" and "Mr. Wonderful." TV Source Magazine described Finn as a "strapping young doctor" who instilled "a breath of fresh air" to the canvas.

Novlan emphasizes that Finn "really does have other people's best interests in mind, although that can sometimes get cloudy." Alternatively, Novlan indicates that "being a doctor, Finn is obviously very patient. He's pretty black and white and analytical." Novlan accentuates and underlines that Finn "has been able to kind of change the perspective of a lot of the other characters that have been in these storylines for a while now and there's a fresh face to deal with. Maybe he doesn't have all the knowledge of the past but sees the situation for what it is in the moment and I think that's really refreshing for the B&B fans." Janet Di Lauro from Soap Hub characterizes Finn as "kind and caring, smart and savvy; the type of man worthy of the Forrester fashion heiress." Novlan states, "for Finn, one of his values is having faith in people."

In December 2022, Adam-Michael James of SoapCentral wrote that Finn became the "Most Rejuvenated Character" of the show, noting that "something new emerged [...] when he woke up from his Sheila-inflicted coma." James continued that when Finn "realized the level of his mama's crazy", he was able to "matched wits with her, occasionally even getting the upper hand." When Finn uncovered that Sheila had faked her own death, James noted that Finn "traded his stethoscope for a detective pipe", which permitted for the addition of an "interesting" layer to the character.

In an October 2023 interview with Soap Opera Digest, Novlan expresses that Finn "is a good man. He is a good husband and father. He is a dedicated doctor." when being asked "What is your favorite thing about playing Finn?" In spite of the horrid acts committed against him by Sheila when she went under cardiac arrest at his hospital, Novlan notes that "he always tries to do what is right, even when it came to saving Sheila’s life."

==== Backstory ====
Entertainment Weekly exclusively reported on June 21, 2021, that Charmed, General Hospital actor and soap veteran Ted King and actress Naomi Matsuda had been cast as Finn's parents, Jack and Li Finnegan, respectively, in what would be the part of the development of Finn's "very dramatic backstory." King first aired on July 30, while Matsuda followed on August 2, 2021. It was later revealed onscreen that Jack and Li, were Finn's adoptive parents who had taken him in as a newborn. Li is likewise a physician, surgeon, specifically, and it was revealed that Finn opt to follow in his mother's footsteps. On August 2, 2021, Soap Opera Digest broke the exclusive announcement that Kimberlin Brown, who is well-known, for playing the notorious villainess Sheila Carter would return to the role on August 6, 2021, with the accompanying revelation that Sheila is Finn's biological mother.

It is later divulged that Jack, is in fact, Finn's biological father and he conceived Finn with Sheila, while married to Li. Both Li and Finn were unaware of this information in the entirety of Finn's life, as Jack arranged this secret adoption and took on this deceptive route in order to hide his affair with Sheila.

In September 2023, Finn's cousin and Li's niece, Luna Nozawa, portrayed by Lisa Yamada, debuted onscreen as a fashion student, interning, at Forrester Creations. Romy Park in the role of Poppy Nozawa, Luna's mother, Li's sister and Finn's aunt, stepped onto the scene in October of that year. Finn and Luna were revealed to have spent their childhood together. However, they lost contact over time due to the sibling estrangement of their respective mothers.

=== Relationship with Steffy ===
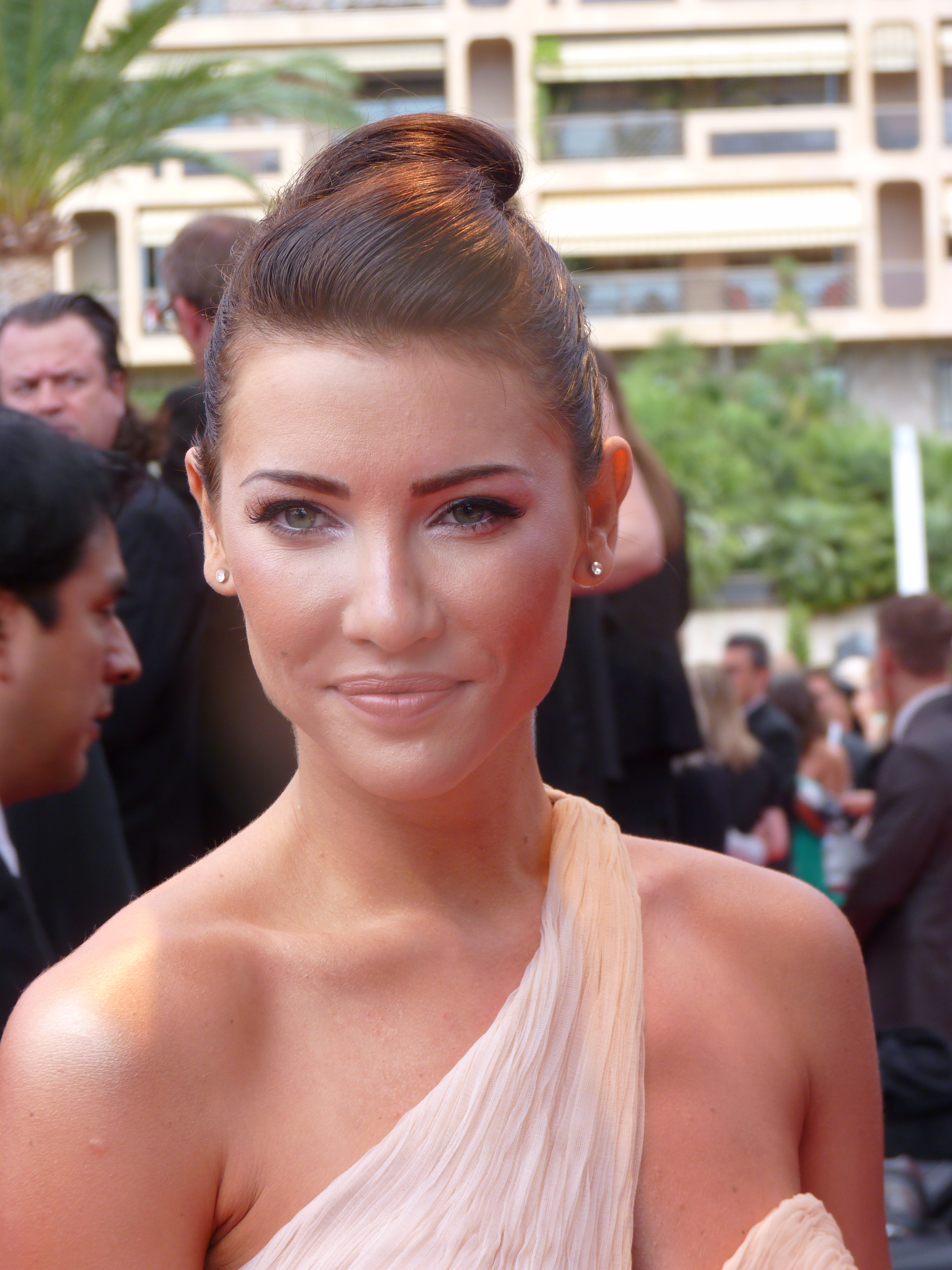
Jacqueline MacInnes Wood plays Steffy, Finn's love interest and mother to his son.

Previewing Finn's introduction as the romantic interest for the established character Steffy Forrester (Jacqueline MacInnes Wood) in the summer of 2020, Bradley Bell expressed that Steffy "is an accomplished mother, businesswoman, and fashion icon. She's an independent woman. Finn is a doctor and has his own life and his own desires and goals separate from hers. They're two complete individuals who can hopefully find a special love with one another."

Finn enters the canvas as the emergency physician who treats Steffy after she is involved in a motorbike accident. When Steffy wakes up at the hospital, the pair immediately lock eyes, strongly suggesting a love at first sight experience. After she is discharged, Finn prescribes Steffy pain medication, most specifically opioids, for her hip and back pain. Realizing that he lives in close proximity to her, Finn soon begins visiting Steffy, offering medical care, psychological counselling, and friendship. As Steffy becomes more vulnerable, the two open up to each other about their past emotional burdens, and a mutual attraction begins to grow. On Finn's feelings for Steffy, Novlan noted: "I think he's slowly learning more and more about her, because at first, he is very professional and very clinical. But as he sees the dynamics of the [Forrester] family, and he's able to observe the relationships that are around her, and he learns how amazing she is, and of course, how beautiful and intriguing and interesting a woman she is, how could you not get sucked in?"

Finn once agreed to prescribe Steffy an extra bottle of pain pills but refused to continue thereafter due to their addictive nature. Bell indicated that "it's fertile ground for the building of a new romance" when referring to Finn becoming Steffy's confidant as she dealt with both her physical and emotional pain, as well as her growing dependency on pain medication. He later tells Steffy that, in order to maintain his professionalism and ethics, he should no longer act as her doctor and will refer her to another physician. Finn confesses that he has developed romantic feelings for her, to which Steffy admits she feels the same. The two share their first kiss.

Alongside Steffy's father Ridge Forrester (Thorsten Kaye) and ex-husband Liam Spencer (Scott Clifton), Finn later stages an intervention after Steffy is found unconscious on her couch from taking unprescribed pills. Finn arranges for Steffy to enter a rehabilitation facility and vows to support her recovery. Following her stay, the pair confess their love and agree to begin an intimate relationship. On their romance, Novlan declared: "It's time that Steffy meets a man with a new set of values, and a new version of what passion and love can bring. She just had her daughter and I think she's ready. Finn seems to have her best interests in mind, and I think that's a good thing for Steffy."

Months later, Steffy discovers she is pregnant. However, due to a drunken one-night stand with Liam, she is uncertain of the baby's paternity. Despite the betrayal, Novlan stated that "Finn loves Steffy very much and he's really praying this goes his way." He emphasized: "[Finn] hopes in his heart that the baby is his. There's a lot riding on this test!" Finn, along with Steffy's brother Thomas Forrester (Matthew Atkinson), later learns that he is indeed the biological father after a paternity test switch orchestrated by Vinny Walker (Joe LoCicero) had falsely identified Liam as the father.

Finn rushes to stop Steffy from leaving for Paris and shares the celebratory news, as Steffy had planned to raise the baby alone to avoid burdening him. Novlan explained: "Steffy was running away and here's a guy who has put his life on the line and said, 'I'm going to stick by you,' and trying to get through to her. She's going to try to say, 'Oh, you don't have to do that.' She feels that 'if you love them, let them go,' kind of thing." With the truth revealed, Finn proposes, and Steffy quickly accepts. The couple later welcome their biological son, Hayes Finnegan (Samantha Worden), at home via a water birth.

The duo eventually marry at the Forrester family mansion, in what was billed as the "Wedding of the Year," surrounded by family and friends. At the reception, notorious villainess Sheila Carter reveals herself as Finn's biological mother. Sheila's obsession with contacting Finn escalates into violence, leading to a confrontation in which Finn takes a bullet meant for Steffy and is presumed dead. Unbeknownst to her, Finn survives and is secretly cared for by his adoptive mother Li. Unable to cope with Finn’s presumed death, Steffy checks herself into a mental health facility in Monaco.

Finn later escapes Sheila’s captivity, where he had been held after she attacked Li. He reunites with Steffy in Monaco, guided by the ringing of church bells. On the cinematic details, Novlan explained: "The church bells were used as a calling to each other, it had a real emotional impact on both characters," specifically "on a spirit and subconscious level," highlighting their soulmate connection. Novlan further described their "love as so deep and so connected," classifying the couple as a "mature relationship."

In a May 2023 publication of Soap Opera Digest, Bell officially designated the Finn and Steffy pairing as a supercouple. In a June 2024 interview with Soaps.com, Novlan referred to Steffy as Finn's "true soulmate."

== Storylines ==
Finn comes upon his patient, Steffy Forrester (Wood), at the hospital after she collided with the vehicle of Bill Spencer, Jr. (Don Diamont) while she was out riding her motorcycle. Finn later visits Steffy at her home, as she had forgotten her discharge paperwork, and he reveals to her that he lived nearby and that he opted to bring them in person. Suffering from her injuries and excruciating pain, Steffy pleaded to him that she needed more pain pills, and Finn was reluctant to do so due to their addictive nature. Steffy reveals to Finn the past emotional burdens that have been affecting her, including the dissolution of her marriage to ex-husband and father of her daughter Kelly, Liam Spencer (Scott Clifton), the death of her twin sister Phoebe Forrester (MacKenzie Mauzy), the loss of the adoptive child that she named in honor of said twin sister as well as the missing presence of her mother Taylor Hayes (Hunter Tylo, later Krista Allen).

Liam visits Finn at his office in the hospital, to get some insight into Steffy's current condition and state of mind, and through this conversation, Liam finds out that Finn has been visiting Steffy at her home, reminiscent of house calls. This revelation prompts Liam to begin questioning Finn's motives and objectivity and he ponders if Finn has a romantic interest in Steffy. Finn assures Liam that his primary concern is Steffy's recovery and her health. Thereafter, Finn goes to Steffy's home and expresses to her that while it has been wonderful getting to know her, that since he has begun developing romantic sentiments for her, it would not be wise for him to continue to be her personal physician and he would refer her to another professional. Steffy refuses and expresses to Finn that she always feels good when she is around him and that she would like him to continue to treat her. Steffy confesses that she herself begun developing romantic feelings for him and plants a kiss on him. The two agree to explore how things could go.

Steffy later takes a pill from an illegal bottle of the set provided by Vinny Walker (Joe LoCicero), which causes her to pass out while taking care of her daughter Kelly. Liam enlists the help of Finn and Steffy's father, Ridge Forrester (Thorsten Kaye) to stage an intervention and convince her to admit she has a problem and agree to enter drug rehabilitation facility. Finn agrees to place Steffy in an institution that would best fit her needs. He began visiting Steffy routinely at the facility. With the assistance of Steffy's caseworker, Michael Tanner (Jarvis George), Finn excitedly tells Steffy that her treatment has been completed. He opts to drive Steffy home and surprises her with her daughter at home by contacting Steffy's nanny. Liam finds out and is infuriated that Finn bypassed him and his wife Hope Logan (Annika Noelle), to have Kelly arranged back at Steffy's home. Liam confronts Finn, and accuses him of attempting to circumvent him out of Steffy's life, and attempts to discourage Steffy to date Finn. Finn and Steffy thereafter professed their love for one another and agree to begin an intimate relationship.

At a visit to Steffy's workplace, Forrester Creations, Finn encounters Steffy's brother, Thomas Forrester (Matthew Atkinson), who has a history of mental illness and also had a strong rivalry with Liam over Hope's affections. Thomas reveals to Finn, his contempt for Liam and to be wary of Liam, due to his tendency of flip-flopping between Steffy and Hope. Finn begins to suspect Thomas' odd behavior. Thomas assures both Steffy and Finn, that he is genuinely has let go of his obsession with Hope. Later, Finn pays Thomas a visit to his apartment to see how he is doing and concludes that Thomas may be unwell. Finn then reveals it to Hope, that it may beneficial if she goes to see how Thomas how he is doing. Hope notices that Thomas has been talking to a mannequin that is a replica of Hope, and began deluded to himself that it was a real-life person. Thomas then collapses, and Hope calls Finn. Finn procures the help of first responders, reveals to the Forresters, including, Steffy, that Thomas has suffered a brain injury. Finn takes part in a surgical operation and saves Thomas' life. As a showiness of gratitude, Steffy spends an intimate night with Finn.

Steffy emotionally confesses to Finn that she had a drunken one-night stand with Liam prior and that she is pregnant, and isn't sure who fathered her baby. Finn confronts Liam and accuses him of having no integrity and using Steffy and attempting to ruin their relationship. Finn then tells Steffy that he isn't at the stage of forgiveness but that he is willing to work with her on their relationship and hopes the baby she is carrying is his. Steffy expresses that she intuitively felt that the baby was Finn's. Steffy and Finn take a paternity test and to their dismay, the results came claiming that Liam fathered the baby. An inconsolable Steffy pleads to Finn to not leave her and to give their relationship another shot. Finn apprehensively agrees due to his love for her.

Finn walks in on Vinny and Thomas, in the hospital laboratory, and overhears Thomas accusing Vinny of altering the paternity test. Finn confronts the pair and engages in a physical altercation. Vinny confesses the truth, that he indeed switched the results and Finn is the biological father of Steffy's baby. Vinny escapes the custody of both men and is later arrested after an investigation opened at the hospital found evidence of his tamperings. Finn rushes to Forrester Creations, hoping to tell Steffy the good news. Upon arrival, he learns from Ridge, that Steffy opted to leave to Paris with her daughter Kelly, in order to let Finn go and not have him endure the responsibility of raising a child that isn't his. Finn catches up to Steffy and reveals to her the celebratory news: he was in fact the biological father of their child and Vinny tampered with the results. Finn proposes to Steffy, which she accepts.

Steffy still opts to leave town with her daughter up the coast, however, due to scheduling conflicts, Finn is unable and has to remain in Los Angeles. He checks in with co-worker Dr. Ricks (Vasthy Mompoint) at the morgue, due to the fact both had to attend a conference together. Much to Finn's shock, the body that Dr. Ricks was examining, was that of Vinny, who the night he had been let go out of on bail, had been the victim of a hit-and-run (it was later revealed that Vinny had died by suicide as he jumped in front of Liam's car). Finn calls Thomas to identify Vinny's body, and later joins Steffy on her trip out of town. Upon their return to Los Angeles, Finn and Steffy reveal to Ridge they spent months camping with Kelly at Joshua Tree before the arrival of their child. At a check-up appointment, the duo also happily learns the sex of their baby; a boy. Thereafter, they welcome their son, Hayes Forrester Finnegan (Samatha Worden), via waterbirth, who is named after his maternal grandmother, Taylor Hayes.

Not long after the birth of Hayes, Finn and Steffy tie the knot at the Forrester mansion. Prior to the wedding, Finn explains to Steffy that he was adopted, and Steffy meets his parents Jack Finnegan (Ted King) and Li Finnegan (Naomi Matsuda). During the reception, Finn goes to the guest house to check on a message from work. When he gets off the phone, Sheila Carter (Kimberlin Brown) appears from the shadows. She congratulates him and reveals to him that she is his biological mother. Finn is excited to finally meet his birth mother, and wants everyone to meet her. Though unbeknownst to him, she already knows them. Everyone is shocked to see her, and believe she is lying and scamming them. Jack confirms the truth, and confesses he had known for years about Sheila and had not told Finn or Li.

During a visit where Jack attempts to warn Sheila off from Finn, Steffy, and Hayes, it is revealed that Jack was, in reality, Finn's biological father. Jack and Sheila had engaged in a past sexual relationship that often took place in the same hospital in which Sheila, a nurse, and Li, a surgeon, were working, and after impregnating Sheila, Jack arranged for Sheila to give up Finn as a newborn, with the objective of having him and Li raised Finn and simultaneously keeping his affair hidden.

Sheila's desire to contact her son developed into an obsession and anybody interrupting or disapproving contact attempts - particularly those who blatantly deny her access to Finn and/or Hayes - would become enemies of Sheila and targets of manipulation, schemes or attacks. It was ultimately a slew of Sheila's crazed attacks that led to Finn being accidentally shot by Sheila herself. Finn had stepped in front of Steffy and took a bullet as Sheila was pointing her gun towards Steffy. Finn later "died" in Steffy's arms.

In late May 2022, Finn was revealed to have survived the shooting and was thus alive, albeit in a state of comatose, being taken care of by his mother, Li. Li kept Finn hidden, unbeknownst to his wife, Steffy, the rest of the Forresters, his father, Jack, and his birth mother, Sheila Carter.

Several weeks later, Finn woke up disoriented and confused inside Li's apartment. At his bedside was Sheila Carter, who had escaped from prison and attacked Li, driving her off the road, after she attempted to alert the police of Sheila's whereabouts to save herself and her son from Sheila's clutches. Finn soon recalls that Sheila had shot him and becomes furious, pleading with Sheila to tell him about Steffy, Hayes, and Li’s whereabouts. Sheila informs him that Steffy and Hayes are on vacation and that everyone believes he’s dead. Finn realizes he’s in a hostage situation as Sheila refuses to let him out or bring him to a hospital. Sheila eventually confesses that Li had died, prompting Finn to harshly react and attempt to choke Sheila, leading her to sedate Finn. Later, Finn wakes up and vows to enact revenge on Sheila for the crimes she had committed against him, his wife, and his mother.

Meanwhile, Li, who survived the car explosion, was discovered disheveled, traumatized, and mute by Bill Spencer in an alley. He brings her to his mansion, believing her to be a complete stranger to him. Days later, Li's memory returns, and she confesses that Finn is alive, quickly recognizing that her son is at Sheila's mercy. Bill brings Li to the apartment where she was taking care of Finn. On his way to escape his captor, Finn emotionally reunites with Li and quickly embraces her. Finn learns from Li and Bill the extent of Sheila's attacks on Li and that Sheila had also shot Steffy, further angering Finn, who lunges at her once again. Bill and Finn overpower her and tie Sheila to the bed before the police arrive, leaving Li with her.

Finn learns that Steffy is in Monaco and has checked herself into a rehabilitation center for depression due to her inability to cope with the loss of her husband, rendering Finn more determined than ever to find her. Bill whisks Finn into his private jet to meet with Steffy. Finn attempts to leave Steffy several messages, but receives no response. As Finn arrives in Monaco, he reunites first with his in-laws, Taylor and Ridge, his step-daughter Kelly, and his son Hayes. They are also unaware of Steffy's whereabouts and are told that Steffy often takes lonely strolls to clear her mind. Determined to find Steffy, Finn sets off to search the streets of Monaco. The ringing of a church’s bells echo and draw both Finn and Steffy toward a church. While inside the church, Steffy tearfully lights a candle of remembrance for Finn. As she exits the house of worship, Steffy and Finn lay eyes on one another and call out each other's names, running desperately into each other's arms. Steffy, in shock, is astounded that her husband is alive, and the two reunite sweetly amidst the ringing of church bells. Finn, Steffy, Hayes, and Kelly complete their reunion back at the hotel before jetting back home to Los Angeles.

== Reception ==
=== Critical and viewer reception ===
==== General ====
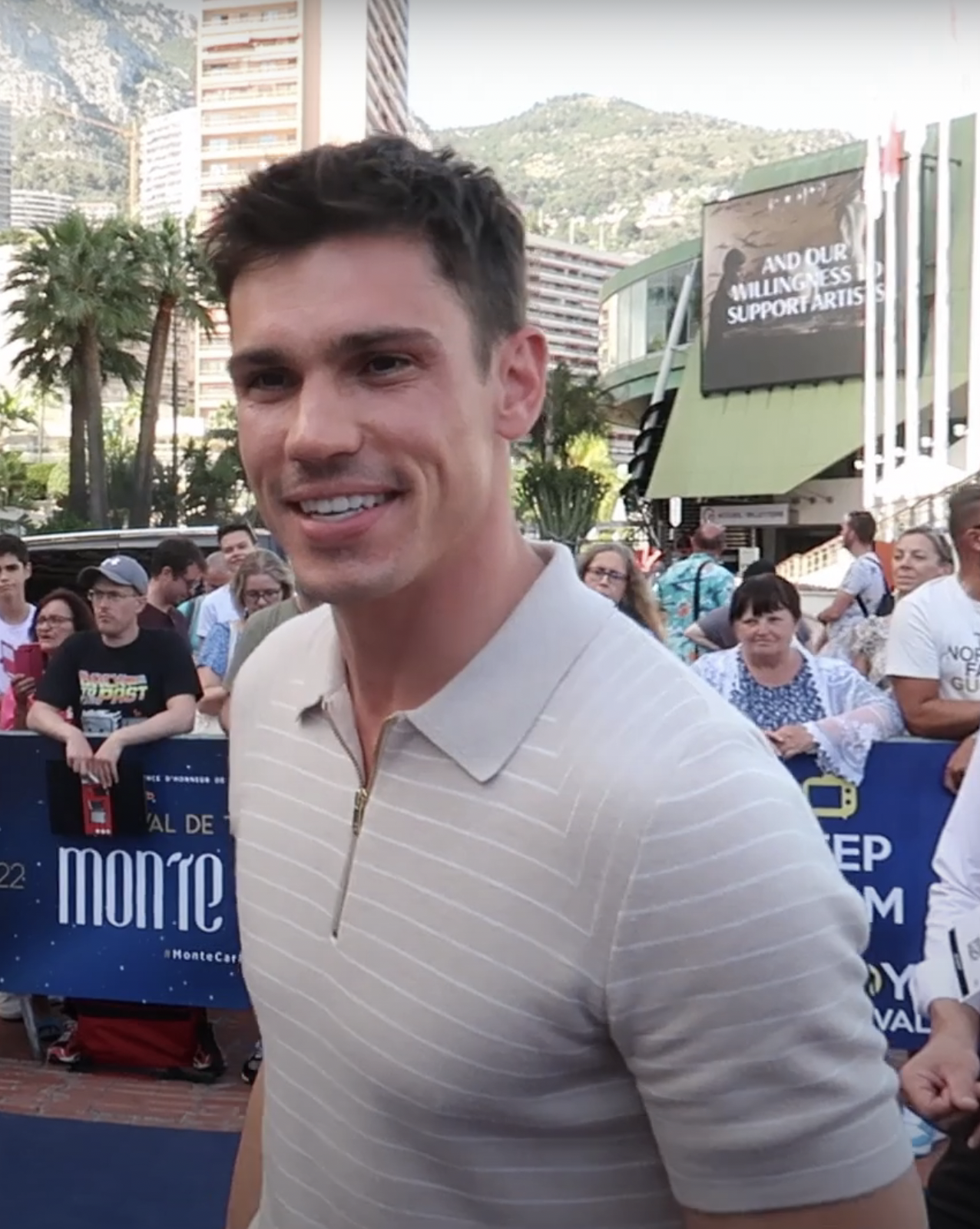
Tanner Novlan's portrayal of Finn has received praise from critics.

Performer of the Week

"It's safe to say the show has given birth to a bona fide leading man in Tanner Novlan — as Dr. John "Finn" Finnegan took center stage. For showing his character's passion and moving into true romantic lead status, Soap Hub gives [Novlan], Performer of the Week honors for BB"

— Michael Maloney, SoapHub (2021)

Soap Opera News ranked Novlan at number-one on its list of the "Top 15 Soap Newcomers of 2020." Next, Soap Opera Digest recorded that Novlan was one of their "Soaps Hottest Newcomers." Charlie Mason, in Soaps.com's "Daytime Soap Operas Best and Worst of 2020," Novlan was bestowed as the "Best Hire" of the year and the site expressed how he was "fitting in nicely as Finn" on the series. Chanel S. Garner from Soapcentral.com praised Novlan's casting, and emphasizes that "the high point of the year was learning that Tanner Novlan had taken on the role of Dr. John Finnegan." The site named that the series' "Best moment of the year" was when "Finn walks into Steffy's life." Soap Hub placed Novlan at number six on its list of the "Top 10 Soap Opera Newcomers of 2020 We Absolutely Love." The site noted that Novlan, who is "tall, dark, handsome" and whose "calm demeanor" truly "embodies the perfect guy."

In 2021, Michael Maloney, from Soap Hub, honored Novlan in mid-January on their site with his first "Soap Hub Performer of the Week for The Bold and the Beautiful" and exclaimed that "as the story calls for Finn to stand up and be strong, we know that Novlan will deliver!" He later earned a second "Performer of the Week" honor from the website in March, for his performance during the paternity reveal and Finn's engagement proposal to Steffy.

Michael Fairman TV gave Novlan recognition for delivering his scenes opposite Brown, when Finn learns and meets, that the ruthless villainess, Sheila Carter, was his birth mother. Fairman wrote, "Finn is overcome, and Tanner Novlan turned in a very good performance as a son who has longed to know his real mother unaware of Sheila's history with the Forresters." Meanwhile, Soap Opera Digest lauded his work for those same scenes, stating that "Tanner Novlan impressively conveyed his character’s simultaneous confusion, awe and disbelief."

For the scenes in which Jack (King) confesses to Finn, that he is indeed, his biological father and has lied for thirty-plus years, Maloney from Soap Hub awarded Novlan, "Performer of the Week for B&B", exclaiming that the actor "not only brought Finn’s betrayal as a son to light in these recent scenes, but he also shined as a son, wanting to support his mother, Li." Maloney continued with "Bravo to Tanner Novlan, who brought new and powerful dimensions to Finn in this current development." In addition, Soap Opera News also praised Novlan for Finn's paternity revelation scenes, commending the actor for his "gold performance" and how those scenes amounted to "an Emmy reel" as he conveyed "Finn's anger, disgust and hurt so powerfully."

In July 2022, Novlan earned another "Performer of the Week for B&B" by Soap Hub for the scenes where Finn woke up from his three-month-long coma and subsequently recollected that Sheila was the one who pulled a trigger on him; the site stating that the actor "not only used his voice but he used his eyes to convey Finn’s feelings" which made for "compelling performances" and allowed him to portray "Finn’s determination and perseverance in a challenging storyline!" Soap Opera News selected the actor as their "Performer of the Week" for those same scenes, asserting that "Novlan's masterful performance captured Finn’s shock and fear" and that his "slow and stuttered speech pattern was spot on for someone who just awoke from a coma."

Soap Opera Digest acclaimed the portrayer for his work where Finn was kept hostage by Sheila, stating that "the real revelation in this story is Tanner Novlan, who has displayed new dimensions of his abilities as he brings Finn's strength in the face of overwhelming adversity to life." Adam-Michael James of Soap Central wrote that "Tanner Novlan has been turning in some killer performances in this arc" and "his scenes with Kimberlin Brown have been the main reason to watch." Soap Hub's Garren Waldo wrote "kudos to Tanner Novlan for delivering a tour de force." Michael Fairman TV praised the dynamic between Novlan and Matsuda, when the mother and son were reunited and expressed that it was "a hankie-inducing moment in the story played to the hilt by Tanner Novlan and Naomi Matsuda." The site also exclaimed that "a very touching performance by Novlan" occurred when Finn reunited with his son Hayes, step-daughter Kelly, as well with his in-laws, Taylor and Ridge. Fairman later emphasized that "throughout this story arc, kudos has to go to Tanner Novlan" as "without his emotional performances and the viewers investing in Finn’s freedom from the hands of Sheila, this would not have played the same."

In August 2022, Soap Opera News named Novlan as the Star of the Month for his work that aired during the month of July, depicting Finn's path to evade captivity and his later reunions with his family, including his mother and children. Adriana Grecco wrote, "Novlan did not disappoint as he delivered a powerful performance after a powerful performance" and successfully took "fans on Finn’s emotional journey." In December 2022, the aforementioned site placed Novlan at number-one, in their list, of "Top 10 Breakout Soap Stars of 2022", asserting that the portrayer "showed off himself during the storyline surrounding his character's "death" and fighting to get back to his wife and child." In the same month, Soap Opera News published their list of "Top 10 Male Soap Performers of 2022", ranking Novlan at number two. In conjunction with fan voting, Novlan secured the number three spot in the 2023 iteration of their list.

For the "Sheila has Finn kidnapped" story arc, Novlan received an honorable mention for "Best Single Performance by an Actor in a Storyline" by Michael Fairman TV. In January 2023, Novlan earned another "Performer of the Week for B&B", with Soap Hub declaring that "the more B&B hands the actor solid material, the more he takes the bull by the horns and delivers." Earning another "Performer of the Week for B&B" in May 2023 from the site, they asserted that "Novlan delivered the dramatic goods" and "got solid acting chops as evidenced by these jailhouse scenes between Sheila and Finn."

In regards to the story in which Finn's attitude towards Sheila began to soften, Soap Opera Digest contended that "the show is now capitalizing on the potential for dramatic fireworks inherent in the 2021 reveal that Sheila is his birth mother — and portrayer Tanner Novlan is making the most of it." The magazine continued with "Novlan has nimbly demonstrated his alter ego's confusion about how to navigate his desire to bond with Sheila and the loyalty he feels to Li (the mother who raised him) and Steffy (the woman who wants nothing to do with Sheila)" and praises the actor for "selling Finn's struggle." Janet Di Lauro from SoapHub echoed a similar sentiment, expressing that Novlan "depicted Finn’s deep confusion and the battle inside him; a battle he didn’t understand was pulling him toward Sheila" and the performer "was at his acting best when Finn begged Steffy not to leave him, proclaiming his love for her and their kids and promising that he’d lay down his life to protect them. His emotions were raw and heartfelt."

In August 2023, Novlan and his co-star, Wood, were named "Performers of the Week" by Soap Opera News for their adept portrayal in the confrontational scenes centered around Kelly's near-drowning incident and Finn's display of embrace of Sheila, which led to Steffy's pivotal decision to move out of their home with their children. The site asserts that "we know for a fact is that this pairing is portrayed by two powerhouse actors who are bringing their A-game to this latest arc." Novlan received commendation from Soap Opera News for his captivating scenes, characterized as a "must-see killer performance" during which Finn blasted Liam for his intrusion in Finn's marriage with Steffy. Soap Hub's Michael Maloney bestowed Novlan the accolade of "Performer of the Week for B&B" for those same scenes, stating that "Novlan brought strength and intensity" which led to "powerful performances." Maloney praised Novlan's range, affirming his ability "to display Finn’s more loving and nurturing side" in scenes pleading Steffy to return home.

During his confrontation with Liam, Finn called Liam "Little Puke" which Novlan revealed he had ad-libbed. This moniker becoming quite a social media sensation, with Soaps.com, declaring that this line drove "the internet bonkers with their approval." Maloney penned "Kudos to Novlan [...] for teaching us that, through his ad-lib that the word ‘puke’ is not just a verb but it is also a noun." Garren Waldo from Soap Hub states that the "adlib is perhaps the greatest in recent memory" meanwhile, Michael Fairman, wrote that it was "the best soap line of the year." In Fairman's list of "The Best and Worst in Soaps 2023," the scene in which Finn faces-off with Liam and labels him "Little Puke" was bestowed "Best Single Moment in a Storyline" whereas Soap Opera News named it as one of the "Best Moments of 2023."

In September 2023, the actor obtained another "Performer of the Week For B&B" accolade by Soap Hub with the online platform noting that "Tanner Novlan brought incredible strength and passion to Finn as the good doctor blasted his [birth] mother for her past actions and let her know they had no future." Soap Opera News praised Novlan for his impressive performance when Deacon and Sheila unveiled their relationship to him, emphasizing that the actor "wowed us in his portrayal" and "did not disappoint."

In March 2024, Novlan was honored with another Performer of the Week recognition by Soap Opera News, sharing the accolade with his co-star Wood for their compelling portrayal of the aftermath of Steffy's self-defense killing of Finn's birth mother, Sheila. The site stated the following, "Novlan, while not yet an award recipient, delivered a fantastic portrayal of Finn’s mixed emotions, adding depth to the already tense storyline." They added that Wood and Novlan "delivered some gut-wrenching performances" and did some "exceptional work." In August 2024, DailyDrama named Novlan the Performer of the Week and praised the actor for a "gripping performance in his relentless pursuit of finding Steffy." Soap Opera News echoed similar sentiments, giving Novlan an honorary mention for his performance in displaying Finn's heroism as he rescued his kidnapped wife.

On the impact of the character on the canvas, Amber Sinclair from DailyDrama commented that "ever since the moment he walked on set, Tanner Novlan has stolen the hearts of The Bold and the Beautiful viewers" and the "introduction of Finn changed the face of the show."

==== Romance ====
Less than a year into his tenure, Novlan's Finn pairing with Steffy proved to be well-received with viewers and critics alike, calling them a "handsome coupling" and "dynamic duo." Finn's relationship with Steffy garnered quite a vocal fan base very quickly with the duo debuting on fan polls in both magazines and online sites, praising their spitfire chemistry both during social distancing protocols as well as post restrictions. Charlene Bazarian notes that "Finn is the first man" in a very long time "who has captured Steffy's heart and fans of [the show] are excited to see what's in the future for this couple." Meanwhile, journalist Jeevan Brar from The TV Watercooler argued that "usually, it takes a while for audiences to warm up to not only a new character, but a new pairing. B&B fans quickly jumped aboard for [Finn], and for Sinn" SoapCentral named "Steffy and Finn" to be the show's "Best New Couple" of the year 2020 and the subsequent year in 2021, the site declared the duo as "Best Couple". Meanwhile, Soap Opera News listed Steffy and Finn at number six on its list of the "Top 10 The Bold and the Beautiful Couples for 2020!" In Soap Opera News's list of "Top 10 Soap Couples of 2021!", Steffy and Finn were ranked at number four. Meanwhile, the following year in 2022, the pairing ascended at number-one, with the site declaring that the "couple proved to be the ultimate duo of the year."

When Steffy learns she is pregnant and is uncertain whether her ex-husband Liam or current mate Finn, fathered her baby; viewers were also left pondering the paternity. On numerous online publications and social media sites, fans, more often than not, highly preferred Finn to be the father. In response to an online poll by Soap Opera Digest, that inquired "Who were you hoping would prove to be the father of Steffy's baby on B&B?", 95 per cent of readers hoped that Finn would be the father of Steffy's unborn child over Liam. Such lopsided results conveyed the positively strong support from the audience of the Steffy and Finn relationship. In July 2021, Steffy and Finn's welcoming of their son Hayes, via, waterbirth proved to be polarizing from audiences, however, earned much praise and acclaim due to the excellent intimacy factor. M. Skye from TVSource Magazine noted that the home birth displayed how "the chemistry between Jacqui [Wood] and Tanner [Novlan] was off the charts." Skye continued to write, "How could they take something like childbirth and make it sexy? Their natural chemistry oozed into all the moments, and they made giving birth look—erotic. They raised the bar, and I truly don't ever want to see a normal soap opera birth again."

In August 2022, Soap Opera Digest published the results of the poll where readers were asked to vote on the "Best Current Pairing," Finn and Steffy led the poll with 59 per cent of the total votes, defeating Quinn and Carter (18%), Brooke and Ridge (16%), Donna and Eric (5%) and Liam and Hope (2%).

Finn and Steffy's reunion, which occurred on location in Monte Carlo, has garnered much positive reviews. The reunion received Soap Opera Digest's "Editor's Choice" in an August 2022 issue, describing it as a "perfect, precious, poignant moment, all was well in the B&B world, and in the 'Sinn' fandom." In their collection of "Soaps’ Best and Worst of 2022," Soaps.com named it as the "Most Romantic Reunion" stating that "it was everything a soap fan could want… and more." Soap Hub’s Best and Worst of 2022 declared that they are "#TeamSinnAllTheWay" naming it to be the "Best Reunion" on the series. In August 2023, Shay McBryde from ShowSnob.com under the FanSided network compiled a list titled "Best Soap Opera couples of 2023: The most sizzling romances on Daytime Television" and ranked Finn and Steffy at number four. Referring to the item, McBryde argues that "if you want to talk about the hottest couples of daytime this is your blueprint" and that they display "the best physical romance in daytime television today."

In a June 2024 Toronto Star article, columnist Shinan Govani referred to Finn and Steffy as a supercouple. Amber Sinclair from DailyDrama states that the pairing is "a fan-favorite supercouple" and "one of daytime TV’s hottest couples." On August 23, 2024, in honor of the four-year milestone since the pairing's inception, members of the Sinn fandom across various social media platforms came together to orchestrate an airplane banner, which flew over CBS Television City with the message: “Happy 4 Years of Sinn J&T We Love You ♥️.”

In 2024, Michael Fairman named Finn and Steffy as his "Best Couple" in his "Best and Worst in Soaps 2024" listing. In his write-up, Fairman enthused, "Who doesn’t love the man of your dreams rescuing you from a deranged young woman who locked you up in a cage! Team Sinn!" Soap Opera Digest also named Steffy and Finn as the "Best Couple" in their "Bold and Beautiful: The Best and Worst of 2024" compilation. Meanwhile, Soap Opera News gave them an honorary mention for "Best Soap Couple of 2024".

==== Departure and return (2022) ====
"B&B pulled of quite an incredible surprise, that Finn never died and Li spirited him away from the hospital. In the days leading up to the big reveal, our email inbox was filled with #SaveFinn messages and fans online were hoping that somehow he could be alive. Well, he is!"

— Stephanie Sloane, Editorial director, Soap Opera Digest (2022)

When Finn was killed off in April 2022 which would signify Novlan's exit from the soap, such a decision was met with severe backlash amongst viewers and critics. In response to an online poll by Soap Opera Digest which asked "How do you feel about B&B killing off Finn?," 84 percent of readers stated that they were devastated and enjoyed the Finn and Steffy romance, indicating major support for the character of Finn. Errol Lewis from Soap Opera Network asserted "fans are currently in an uproar following the recent twist which found Finn’s biological mother, Sheila, being the one to pull the trigger after he came upon her". Meanwhile, Richard Simms from Soaps.com affirmed that "whole lot of anger was being directed toward the show’s scribes" over Finn's exit on social media and jokingly explained that the outrage has illustrated that "perhaps the writers might want to seek shelter."

The hashtag #SaveFinn, as well as online petitions, began to circle across various social media platforms, including Twitter, in which fans, were notably advocating and campaigning for Novlan's return on the soap as Finn. The negative response was quite palpable, co-star Wood (Steffy) was inquired, by the series' supervisor producer, Casey Kasprzyk, during an episode of BoldLive, who himself confessed the level of fan reaction towards the storyline and, essentially asked the actress if she "expect[ed] fans to be as sad as they were when Sheila put a slug in her son?" which Wood responded with "I expected this reaction 'cause I reacted the exact same way."

In May 2022, Soaps.com released their list of "The 35 Actors Soaps Need Back in Action", Novlan was amongst those actors included, and the author of the article stated, "when fans freak like they did over the death of Finn on Bold & Beautiful, you know the actor’s someone who should get a new lease on life," noting that the adverse reaction over the character's death was conspicuous and the wish for his return is strongly yearned for by the audience as he is a fan favorite.

In a surprising turn for viewers, Finn was unveiled as alive but in a coma during the May 23 episode, indicating that Novlan had not actually departed from the series. As a guest on The Talk, Novlan emphasized the strong viewer response to his character's presumed death and revealed that he had been sworn to secrecy regarding his return, he stated; "I was blown away at the fans' reaction to this and 'Sinn' nation...I couldn't believe the support, but, in fact, I'm contractually obligated not to tell you guys and I felt awful about it."

Soaps.com listed Novlan's return and Finn's resurrection as "Best May Sweeps Reveal" in their repertoire of "Soaps’ Best and Worst of 2022". Out of all current daytime dramas, Soap Opera Digest's named "Finn is alive" as the "Best Story" in their "Best & Worst of 2022" list, stating that "resurrection tales are not super-common in the B&B universe, but by granting Steffy her miracle [being reunited with Finn], the show provided the romantic apex of the year." Soap Hub’s Best and Worst of 2022 classified "Finn's alive" as the Biggest Shock, while, SoapCentral described it as one of the "Most Riveting Moments" of the show in 2022. "Finn is alive" was bestowed the "Best Storyline" honor amongst all four daytime soaps in Michael Fairman TV's "The Best and Worst in Soaps 2022" list, detailing that "it was a shocker," "this story worked on many levels" and with Finn and Steffy's reunion in Monaco as the resolution, "the story came full-circle." In October 2023, Dylan St. Jaymes, a writer for The List, featured Finn's resurrection in their compilation titled "The Best Soap Opera Return-From-The-Dead Plotlines," dubbing the storyline as "a hero homecoming."
