= Ryan Ashton =

American actor, director, and screenwriter

- Born: September 24, 1984 (age 41); New York, New York
- Education: University of North Carolina School of the Arts (BFA)
- Occupations: Actor, director, screenwriter

Ryan Ashton (born September 24, 1984) is an American actor, director, and screenwriter. Ashton is best known for his portrayal of Zack Sinnett on the CBS daytime soap opera The Young and the Restless, which earned a nomination for the Daytime Emmy Award for Guest Performer in a Drama Series in 2018.

He appeared in the feature film, Allegiant, and in the Bedsider series The Guys Guide to Birth Control, which was featured in The New York Times and The Huffington Post. He grew up in Scituate, Massachusetts before attending The University of North Carolina School of the Arts School of Filmmaking where he received a BFA in Directing for Film.
