= Hoodlum & Son =

- Directed by: Ashley Way
- Written by: Ashley Way
- Starring: Mia Sara; Ted King; Ron Perlman; Robert Vaughn; Myles Jeffrey
- Distributed by: Anchor Bay Entertainment
- Release date: 27 September 2003
- Running time: 92 minutes
- Country: United Kingdom
- Language: English

Hoodlum & Son is a 2003 British comedy-crime film, written and directed by Ashley Way.

== Plot ==
In 1933, a mischievous ten-year-old, Archie, is left in the care of his unattentive father, Charlie, a reluctant gangster indebted to mob boss Benny “The Bomb” Palladino. Benny gives Charlie a last chance to clear his ‘debt’ by collecting money from a rival, but when Archie follows his father into a rival gangster's speakeasy, a series of bizarre events take place culminating in them fleeing without the money.

They head south to a dustbowl town where Charlie plans to repay his debt by stealing money from a bootlegging business run by Ugly Jim McCrae. However, Charlie realises things will not be that easy and is forced into taking a teaching job as cover which brings father and son closer.

When a beautiful widowed mother, Ellen Heaven (Mia Sara) takes offence at the new teacher, she does all she can to get him thrown out of town. Torn between their responsibilities and their attraction to each other, passions are awoken and Charlie and Ellen fall in love. However, the two revengeful mob bosses have not forgotten Charlie and arrive in town to settle scores.

== Cast ==
- Mia Sara - Ellen Heaven
- Ted King - Charlie Ellroy
- Ron Perlman - 'Ugly' Jim McCrae
- Robert Vaughn - Benny 'The Bomb' Palladino
- Myles Jeffrey - Archie Ellroy
- Emily McArthur - Alabama Lubitsch
- Michael Richard - Sheriff Duggan
- Russel Savadier - 'Four Eyes' Morton
- Ian Roberts - Earl
- Karin van der Laag - Big 'Juicy' Lucy
- Anthony Bishop - Gillis Johnson
- Anthony Fridjohn - Police Chief
- Charlotte Savage - Virginia Heaven
- Giles Hudson - Undertaker
