= Cruel Summer (TV series) =

2021 American teen drama mystery anthology series

- Season 1 title card
- Genre: Teen drama; Mystery; Thriller; Anthology
- Created by: Bert V. Royal
- Starring: Olivia Holt; Chiara Aurelia; Froy Gutierrez; Harley Quinn Smith; Brooklyn Sudano; Blake Lee; Allius Barnes; Nathaniel Ashton; Michael Landes; Sadie Stanley; Lexi Underwood; Griffin Gluck; Lisa Yamada; Sean Blakemore; KaDee Strickland
- Music by: Wendy Melvoin; Lisa Coleman
- Country of origin: United States
- Original language: English
- No. of seasons: 2
- No. of episodes: 20

Production
- Executive producers: Max Winkler; Bert V. Royal; Tia Napolitano; Jessica Biel; Michelle Purple; Bill Purple; Elle Triedman
- Producers: Nicole Colombie; Jamie Neese; Jason Neese; Rohit Kumar
- Production locations: Texas; Richmond, British Columbia
- Cinematography: Damián García; Jayson Crothers; Allan Westbrook; Mark Berlet
- Editors: Christopher Nelson; Meridith Sommers; Damien Smith; Jeff Israel; Troy Takaki; Mark Bourgeois; Diandra Kendall Luzon
- Running time: 42–45 minutes
- Production companies: Entertainment One; Iron Ocean Productions; Ides of March Productions

Original release
- Network: Freeform
- Release: April 20, 2021 – July 31, 2023

Cruel Summer is an American teen drama mystery thriller anthology television series created by Bert V. Royal. The first season follows two teenage girls in the mid-1990s and the repercussions on everyone's lives after one disappears and the other seemingly takes her place. The second season follows the rise and fall of an intense teenage friendship between two girls in 1999 and 2000.

The series premiered on Freeform on April 20, 2021. In June 2021, the series was renewed for a second season, which premiered at the ATX Television Festival on June 2, 2023, ahead of its broadcast premiere on Freeform on June 5, 2023. In December 2023, the series was canceled after two seasons. The first season received critical acclaim, particularly for Holt's and Aurelia's acting. In August 2025, it was announced the series had been revived and that a third season was in development.

== Overview ==
=== Season 1: Jeanette and Kate ===
Set between 1993 and 1995 in the fictional town of Skylin, Texas, the first season follows two teenage girls whose lives become deeply entangled. Sweet but socially awkward Jeanette Turner undergoes a striking transformation after the sudden disappearance of the beautiful and popular Kate Wallis—seemingly stepping into Kate's life. But when Kate is found alive over a year later, she accuses Jeanette of witnessing her abduction and staying silent, turning Jeanette into one of the most hated people in the nation. As a legal battle unfolds, friendships, families, and reputations are put to the test. But beneath the surface, both girls may be hiding secrets about what really happened.

=== Season 2: Megan, Isabella, and Luke ===
Set between 1999 and 2000 in the fictional town of Chatham, Washington, the second season follows three teenage friends whose lives take a dark turn. Aspiring coder Megan Landry and her family welcome Isabella LaRue, a charismatic foreign exchange student, into their home for a year. The two girls form a deep bond—one that becomes increasingly complicated when both develop feelings for Megan's childhood best friend, Luke Chambers. But what starts as a tangled love triangle soon spirals out of control when a leaked sex tape shatters their lives—leading to Luke's shocking murder. With suspicion mounting, Megan and Isabella find themselves at the center of the investigation, but the truth may be far more twisted than anyone expects.

== Cast and characters ==
=== Main (season 1) ===
- Olivia Holt as Kate Wallis, a popular girl who goes missing without a trace
- Chiara Aurelia as Jeanette Turner, a nerdy girl who takes over Kate's life after her disappearance.
- Froy Gutierrez as Jamie Henson, Kate's, and later Jeanette's, boyfriend
- Harley Quinn Smith as Mallory Higgins, one of Jeanette's best friends before her newfound popularity, and later Kate's best friend
- Brooklyn Sudano as Angela Prescott, a bar owner and Greg's new girlfriend
- Blake Lee as Martin Harris, the new vice-principal of Skylin High School who held Kate captive
- Allius Barnes as Vince Fuller, one of Jeanette's best friends before her newfound popularity
- Nathaniel Ashton as Ben Hallowell, (Note: Nathaniel Ashton was credited as a series regular for the first episode, but credited as guest starring starting from the second episode.) Jamie's best friend
- Michael Landes as Greg Turner, Jeanette and Derek's father, Cindy's ex-husband, and Angela's boyfriend

=== Recurring (season 1) ===
- Sarah Drew as Cindy Turner, Jeanette and Derek's mother and Greg's ex-wife
- Barrett Carnahan as Derek Turner, Jeanette's older brother and Cindy and Greg's son
- Nicole Bilderback as Denise, Jeanette's lawyer
- Andrea Anders as Joy Wallis, Kate's wealthy self-centered mother with a Southern accent
- Ben Cain as Rod Wallis, Joy's second husband and Kate's stepfather
- Jason Douglas as Nick Marshall, Kate's lawyer

=== Main (season 2) ===
- Sadie Stanley as Megan Landry, an intelligent high school student and coder who wants to go to the University of Washington as a Computer Science major after high school
- Lexi Underwood as Isabella LaRue, an exchange student who is living with the Landry family for a year
- Griffin Gluck as Luke Chambers, Megan's best friend who comes from a well-known family
- Lisa Yamada as Parker Tanaka, a friend of Megan and Luke's
- Sean Blakemore as Sheriff Myer, the Sheriff of Chatham, Washington
- KaDee Strickland as Debbie Landry, Megan's single mother

=== Recurring (season 2) ===
- Braeden De La Garza as Brent Chambers, Luke's older brother
- Nile Bullock as Jeff, one of Megan and Luke's friends who is always filming life around him with his camcorder
- Ben Cotton as Ned, an irascible loner with a grudge against Steve Chambers who becomes Megan's coder mentor
- Paul Adelstein as Steve Chambers, Luke's father
- David James Lewis as Tom Galvin, Megan's lawyer
- Jessica Hayles as Rebecca, Isabella's lawyer and advisor

In addition, Jenna Lamb co-stars as Lily Landry, Megan's younger sister.

== Episodes ==
=== Series overview ===
Season	Episodes	Originally released	
Season	Episodes	First released	Last released
1	10	April 20, 2021	June 15, 2021
2	10	June 5, 2023	July 31, 2023

=== Season 1 (2021) ===
No. overall	No. in season	Title	Directed by	Written by	Original release date	U.S. viewers (millions)
1	1	"Happy Birthday, Jeanette Turner"	Max Winkler	Bert V. Royal	April 20, 2021	0.274
In 1993, Jeanette Turner bumps into popular Kate Wallis and her boyfriend, Jamie Henson, at the mall where Jeanette and her friends Mallory Higgins and Vince Fuller create a bucket list of daring activities to challenge each other. While playing hide-and-seek in a house her father Greg recently sold, Jeanette meets Martin Harris, the house's new owner and Skylin High's new vice principal. In 1994, Kate has been missing for a year, and the now-popular Jeanette celebrates her birthday with Kate's friends and Jamie, her now-boyfriend. A jealous Mallory confronts Jeanette for taking over Kate's life, which Jeanette dismisses. When it is announced that Kate has been found alive, Jeanette runs to see Jamie, who punches her in the face. In 1995, Jeanette – now a nation-wide pariah – spends her birthday meeting with lawyers and fighting with her father and his new girlfriend, Angela. As Jeanette watches reruns of the news, it is revealed Kate was abducted by Martin, who was later killed in a shootout with the police. In another interview, Kate condemns Jeanette publicly, saying Jeanette saw her being held in captivity and did nothing.
2	2	"A Smashing Good Time"	Bill Purple	Bert V. Royal	April 20, 2021	0.218
In 1993, Jeanette, Mallory, and Vince meet Jamie's best friend Ben who offers advice on a prank the trio are planning. Kate believes her stepfather, Rod, is cheating on her mother, Joy. She tells Joy and attempts to find proof but discovers Rod is only planning a surprise cruise. Kate apologizes to Joy, who berates Kate for making accusations and being an embarrassment. Upset, Kate leaves the party and gets drunk. The gardener Scott returns Kate home where she later discovers Joy and Scott are having an affair. Distressed, Kate sneaks out again and is found by Martin Harris. In 1994, Jamie – who has reconciled with Kate – and Rod are worried that Kate refuses to talk to the police or go to therapy. Jamie secretly meets with Jeanette, who swears she is innocent and begs Jamie to believe her; the two kiss as Kate secretly watches. Angry, Kate goes to the police and offers Jeanette's necklace into evidence as proof of her accusation. In 1995, Kate has taken a dark turn, becoming acerbic and hostile. In an online abduction victims' chatroom, Kate confesses to an anonymous friend that she has not been completely honest. Kate later discovers Jeanette is suing her for defamation and screams, enraged.
3	3	"Off with a Bang"	Kellie Cyrus	Bert V. Royal	April 27, 2021	0.228
In 1993, Mallory is furious when Jeanette flushes the stash of joints that Mallory pilfered from her mother. Cindy suggests Jeanette distance herself from Mallory, recalling her own high school popularity and friendship/rivalry with Kate's mother. Jeanette instead sneaks over to Martin Harris' house to steal an old yearbook as an apology gift for Mallory. In 1994, Greg and Derek furiously confront Jamie for punching Jeanette. Jeanette is questioned by the police and is shocked when they produce her necklace. Cindy begins to doubt Jeanette. Vince meets up with Ben, whom he is secretly dating. Jamie asks Jeanette to keep their kiss a secret and asks how she seemingly knew Kate went missing before everyone else did. In 1995, Kate angrily confronts Jeanette when they bump into each other out driving, but Jeanette drives off. Jeanette, ignoring Cindy's calls, practices how to be more likable by mimicking television shows. Vince, concerned about talking to Jeanette's lawyers about the lawsuit, calls Ben, but Ben tells Vince to stop calling as it pains him to hear from Vince. During the fireworks, Jeanette breaks into Martin's house and encounters Vince in the basement. They have a heart-to-heart, and Jeanette admits she has been to Martin's house many times. Vince later lies to Jeanette's lawyers, saying he does not know if she ever went back to Martin's house.
4	4	"You Don't Hunt, You Don't Eat"	Laura Nisbet-Peters	Imogen Binnie	May 4, 2021	0.260
In 1993, Kate attempts to bond with her step-sister Ash as the family prepares for their annual hunting trip. Kate tries to confide in Ash about Joy's affair, but Ash brushes her off before she's able to. Kate abandons a date with Jamie in favor of stargazing with Martin. In 1994, Kate attends therapy where she meets Mallory; the two bond over their mutual hatred of Jeanette. The police tell Kate and Joy that they do not have a solid case against Jeanette, as fingerprints on necklace were inconclusive. Ash attempts to bond with Kate, but Kate blames Ash for driving her to confide in Martin. After Derek jokes that Ash should assume an alter ego to reach Kate, Ash joins Kate's abduction victims' chatroom under an alias. In 1995, Joy panics when she finds a note with the word "liar" on their front door and organizes their annual hunting trip to ensure their friends will support Kate. Joy accuses Mallory of sending the note. At the campfire, Kate tells a "ghost story" about her abduction, using a character named Annabelle, and blames the adults for putting her in Martin's path. Later, Kate listens to tapes of her therapy sessions to catch inconsistencies. In a recording, she describes meeting "Annabelle" near the end of her abduction but cannot recall who that is.
5	5	"As the Carny Gods Intended"	Daniel Willis	Tia Napolitano	May 11, 2021	0.236
In 1993, Jeanette attends a date at the carnival with dorky out-of-towner Gideon but abandons him after people make fun of them. Martin later scolds her. Kate and Martin continue to bond, then steals her left-behind scrunchie when she leaves. When Jeanette notices, she offers to return it to Kate and takes it from him. In 1994, Kate confronts Jamie about his kiss with Jeanette, but he accuses her of making it up. When he attempts to gaslight her by blaming her post-traumatic shaky memory, she breaks up with him. Jeanette and Derek attend the carnival in hopes of talking things out with Kate, while Cindy starts to descend into alcoholism. Greg meets Angela at a video store. After Jeanette chases Kate and Mallory into a mirror maze, Derek tells her she should go back to being her old self, but Jeanette says she cannot. In 1995, Greg tells Jeanette how he has lost everything defending her. Kate and Mallory head to the carnival in hopes of finding Jeanette, but Kate finds Jamie instead, who finally admits to the kiss and apologizes to her. Angela brings Jeanette to her bar for karaoke. Mallory brings Kate to the cemetery where they desecrate Martin's grave.
6	6	"An Ocean Inside Me"	Kellie Cyrus	Brian Otaño	May 18, 2021	0.261
In 1993, Jeanette, Mallory, and Vince shoplift as Tenille's mother Tanya flirts with Martin. Jeanette covers for Vince and goes to "mall jail", where she bonds with Jamie. Later, Jeanette sneaks into Martin's house. When Martin and Tanya return, Jeanette hides in a closet. Jeanette witnesses Tanya confiding in Martin in an attempt to seduce him. Tanya discovers Jeanette in the closet and allows Jeanette to leave without telling Martin. In 1994, Greg and Cindy argue as Derek prepares to go to college. Cindy snoops around Jeanette's room and finds Martin's house key. When Greg and Derek both belittle her concerns, Cindy leaves to stay with her sister. Later, Jeanette catches a near-kiss between Vince and Ben at the video store; while Tanya gives an interview where she paints Martin, instead of herself, as the aggressor while recounting their date. Greg, to his disappointment, confirms the key Cindy found in Jeanette's room is Martin's house key. In 1995, Denise warns Jeanette that Tanya will be deposed. Jeanette blackmails Tanya with what Tanya had confided to Martin. Tanya does not testify against Jeanette. Cindy approaches Angela at her bar to ask about Jeanette's wellbeing.
7	7	"Happy Birthday, Kate Wallis"	Alexis Ostrander	Savannah Ward	May 25, 2021	0.198
In 1993, Kate is uneasy when Jamie gifts her a promise ring. Jamie gets drunk at the mall with Kate and her friends, and the two accept a ride from Martin. When Kate arrives to her birthday dinner celebration late, a furious Joy tells her she already told everyone to go home. Kate reveals Joy's affair to Rod, and Joy slaps Kate. Devastated, Kate runs away to Martin's house. In 1994, Kate is unable to eat or sleep. After inviting Mallory over for the first time and disclosing this to her, the two get high along with Ash. Joy pressures a reluctant Kate to go on a talk show to which she later agrees after a random girl claims Martin had once tried to abduct her too. In 1995, Kate continues listening to her therapy tapes before Mallory brings her to a roller rink to celebrate her birthday. Mallory later finds out that Joy herself was behind the "liar" letter on the Wallis' front door. Kate confronts Joy, who reveals that she is upset Kate never forgave her. Derek discovers Ash's anonymous messages with Kate in the online chat room and prints a copy to take to Jeanette, which shows that Kate had originally gone to Martin's willingly.
8	8	"Proof"	Daniel Willis	Addison McQuigg	June 1, 2021	0.310
In 1993, Vince and Jeanette abandon their posts to keep watch while Mallory plays a prank video school-wide. Jeanette overhears a meeting between Martin and Joy where Joy discloses that Kate never came home the previous night. After Mallory is caught and her video confiscated by Martin, she angrily confronts Jeanette, who breaks off their friendship. Martin destroys the confiscated tape because it shows Kate in his house's window momentarily. In 1994, Greg questions Jeanette about the key to Martin's house and forces her to give it to the police. Jeanette tries to pull away from Vince in order to protect his secret relationship with Ben and soon decides to drop out of school to avoid scrutiny. A drunken Jamie is arrested after accidentally crashing his car while driving Ben, leaving Ben with a serious arm injury. In 1995, Jeanette presents her newfound proof to her lawyer Denise before meeting her estranged mother for breakfast. Jeanette meets with Jamie, who finally apologizes for punching her. After, he plays Jeanette a cryptic voicemail of heavy breathing that he received the Christmas Eve after Kate's abduction, Jeanette rushes to Mallory's and asks for "the" snow globe, which Mallory pretends she does not have.
9	9	"A Secret of My Own"	Alexis Ostrander	Matt Antonelli	June 8, 2021	0.297
In 1993, Martin leaves Kate at his house where she stays the day instead of going to school. After Kate is designated a missing person, Martin worries and tells her to go, but the two procrastinate instead by playing Never Have I Ever. After twenty-one days together, the two have started a romantic relationship under the mutual agreement Kate must not leave his house. Halloween and Thanksgiving pass, and on Christmas Eve Kate has fallen into a depressive state as she misses the outside world. That night, Jeanette sneaks into Martin's house while he is out shopping and steals a snow globe (the one in Mallory's possession in 1995) but accidentally drops her necklace, which Kate picks up and keeps secret from Martin. Kate later sneaks out to spy on her parents and leaves with the assumption they are enjoying their lives without her. The following night, Kate attempts to leave for good but Martin locks her in the basement to protect his reputation. In 1994 during therapy, Kate recalls her first couple months of captivity in which she was not locked in the basement. Her therapist informs her Martin was grooming her.
10	10	"Hostile Witness"	Bill Purple	Bert V. Royal	June 15, 2021	0.386
In 1993, Mallory confronts Jeanette at her home over stealing Martin's snow globe. Jeanette gives her the snow globe and kicks her out of the house. In 1994, Jeanette again breaks into Martin's house and hears Kate calling for help from the basement but ignores her pleas. Kate does not realize Jeanette heard her. In 1995, the court case begins while Jamie and Jeanette continue to reconnect. Kate's honesty comes into question when her online chats are presented as evidence. Desperate, Kate has Jeanette meet her at Martin's house where they revisit the night Jeanette supposedly saw Kate. The two realize it was actually Mallory who saw Kate in captivity. Kate apologizes to Jeanette before the two visit the basement where Kate finally recalls that "Annabelle" is Martin's gun, which she used to shoot him after he could not bring himself to do it. Later, Kate publicly proclaims Jeanette's innocence before confronting Mallory. Mallory reveals she did not know it was Kate she had seen and only pieced it together after Kate's rescue but could not reveal her secret then without exposing that Kate was not always Martin's prisoner. Jeanette later forgives Kate on The Marsha Bailey Show while Kate and Mallory kiss.

=== Season 2 (2023) ===
No. overall	No. in season	Title	Directed by	Written by	Original release date	U.S. viewers (millions)
11	1	"Welcome to Chatham"	Bill Purple	Elle Triedman and Tia Napolitano	June 5, 2023	0.223
In summer 1999, a reluctant Megan Landry, her sister, Lily, and their mother, Debby, welcome exchange student Isabella LaRue. Megan shows Isabella around town before Megan's best friend, Luke Chambers, introduces Isabella to their friend group and invites her to a party at the lake during an annual bioluminescence event. Isabella asks Megan's permission to hook up with Luke to which Megan agrees (though immediately regrets). In winter 1999, Megan, now dating Luke and best friends with Isabella, receives a scholarship to University of Washington. Debby and her coworker Steve (who is also Luke's father) are dating as well. While hooking up at the Chambers' cabin, Megan and Luke witness a local conspiracy theorist shooting a gun in the woods. At the Chambers' Christmas party, a video of Isabella and Luke having sex is played. Megan storms out, humiliated. In summer 2000, Megan is now taking care of Lily after Debby has fallen ill. She simultaneously avoids the police who have been trying to question her. After hearing a body has been found in the lake, Megan drives to the cabin and cleans blood from the floor before joining a crowd of people at the lake as the police recover the corpse, which has been identified to be Luke. Isabella tells Megan they have to get their stories straight.
12	2	"Ride or Die"	Laura Nisbet-Peters	Matt Morgan	June 5, 2023	0.116
In summer 1999, Isabella writes to her boarding school roommate, Lisa. Isabella convinces Luke to throw a party at his pool. Attendees include Brent, Luke's older brother, Parker, Brent's girlfriend, and Jeff, a boy filming everything with his video camera. Isabella and Megan agree to find a way to tolerate each other before Isabella and Luke kiss. In winter 1999, Isabella is put on probation at school for the video, but it's revealed it was actually Megan in the video and Isabella is taking the fall to protect Megan's scholarship. The two burn the video tape and plan to find out who played it at the party. Suspecting Brent, Isabella and Parker break into the Chambers household and steal all their video tapes. Upset after overhearing Megan call Luke the most important person in her life, Isabella tells Debby there's something she should know. In summer 2000, Luke's autopsy reveals he drowned, but was also drugged with muscle relaxants and grazed by a bullet. The police question Megan, Isabella, and their friend group, revealing that Luke was last seen on News Year's Day. However, Sheriff Myer becomes more suspicious of Isabella due to her past. Isabella calls her lawyer for help before flushing down medication.
13	3	"Bloody Knuckles"	Bill Purple	Heather F. Robb	June 12, 2023	0.124
In summer 1999, Megan and Isabella tag along with the Luke and the boys to Luke's family cabin for their annual camping trip. On the trip, it is revealed that Jeff has a crush on Megan, but she fails to notice it as she grows suspicious of Luke and Isabella's growing friendship. As they go home from the campout, Megan finds her mother and her estranged father kissing on their front porch. Isabella and Megan bond over their parents' terrible history. In winter 1999, Megan is upset that Isabella confessed to Debbie that it was actually Megan on the tape, and they get into an argument about loyalty. Meanwhile, a box of the tapes is mysteriously dropped off at the sheriff's office, showing Brent having filmed sex with minors, but managed to avoid the any punishment from the law as his father gets it swept under the rug. Megan and Isabella discover that Jeff knows about Megan being on the tape, and decide to blackmail him for his silence. In summer 2000, as the case intensifies, the sheriff informs Megan and Debbie that the murder weapon used in Luke's death had Isabella and Megan's fingerprints on it. Isabella's parents send her a lawyer who helped her out of trouble in a previous incident in St. Barts in 1998, and as a friendly gesture, Isabella advises Megan to obtain a good lawyer. While in the sheriff office getting interrogated, Megan and Isabella stick to their stories of last seeing Luke on New Year's Day and dropping him off at home. However, security footage from his house proves them wrong. When the sheriff asks them about the cabin, the girls insist that they have not been to the cabin in months, but the sheriff shows Isabella a bag filled with cash that was found in the cabin.
14	4	"Springing a Leak"	Ben Hernandez Bray	Elle Triedman	June 19, 2023	0.073
In summer 1999, Megan and Jeff create fake IDs so that they, along with Luke and Isabella, can go to a bar. Megan and Isabella gain entrance, though Jeff and Luke have to wait outside before Sheriff Myer discovers them. Hanging out at the Chambers', Luke kisses Isabella out of jealousy after seeing Jeff and Megan kissing. In winter 1999, Megan's ceiling begins leaking and the Landrys, along with Isabella, attempt to stay with the Chambers. However, at dinner, Brent's behavior, along with the fact that Steve got Myer to drop the charges against them, creates a rift between Steve and Debbie. Isabella offers a share of $5000 for the repairs, but Megan declines. In summer 2000, Megan disposes of bloody blankets in the garbage, though does not spot Isabella watching her. Myer interrogates Megan that she was the last person to see Luke alive before he was killed, adding that things were not the same from the time of the sex tape, to when she got pregnant.
15	5	"All I Want for Christmas"	Hiromi Kamata	Heather Thomason	June 26, 2023	0.095
In summer 1999, Isabella writes another letter to her best friend Lisa and is shaken by the unexpected arrival of Trevor, her former lover and Lisa's brother. Tagging along to a Christmas in July party, Trevor realizes that Isabella has not told Megan about what happened in St. Barts before her arrival. Isabella attempts to seduce Trevor when confronted, but he rebuffs and leaves. Afterward, Isabella and Luke have sex at the Cabin, though later she discovers Megan has feelings for him, and decides to break up telling Megan she is not ready for a serious relationship. In winter 1999, Isabellas gift to Megan gains more resentment at Isabella for social status. Megan goes to Ned and agrees to do a job for him. Debbie discovers Isabella's unsent letters to Lisa, to which Isabella responds by saying that her friend is "patient". In summer 2000, Isabella's lawyer outs Megan's secret pregnancy to the public, which causes further rift between Megan and Isabella. Being told by Megan to pick "her side", Debbie tells Isabella to leave. Later, Megan receives a letter from Trevor revealing what happened in St. Barts and how Lisa has been dead the whole time.
16	6	"The Plunge"	Laura Nisbet-Peters	Jason Sack	July 3, 2023	0.145
In summer 1999, Megan plans a party for Luke's 17th birthday and learns that Isabella dumped him the night before. Later at the party, Megan is dumped by Jeff. In winter 1999, Megan prepares to spend a day with Isabella and Luke at "The Plunge", but bails last minute to work for Ned at his home. After jumping into the ice cold lake and sharing a towel, Luke kisses Isabella, but she backs away out of respect for her and Megan's friendship. After returning from Ned's, Megan has sex with Luke, who lies to her by claiming that Isabella tried to kiss him. In summer 2000, everyone is remembering Luke as his 18th birthday rolls around. Megan learns about Isabella fleeing St. Barts after her best friend Lisa drowned from swimming while drunk. Megan then confronts Isabella for not being honest since her arrival and suspects that she killed Luke. Unknown to them, Parker was eavesdropping on their conversation and shares what she heard to Sheriff Myer. Debbie discovers the bloody sheets in Isabella's airstream and demands Megan to tell the truth.
17	7	"It's the End of the World"	Bill Purple	Matt Morgan & Elle Triedman	July 10, 2023	0.081
In summer 1999, Megan and Isabella clean up after her party when Luke invites her to help him clean up the cabin. While at the cabin, they reminisce about the past when they come across walkie talkies. They then head out through the woods to the dock where Megan learns that Luke remembers the night before and they share a kiss. In winter 1999, Megan is still upset that Isabella kissed Luke and did not tell her. In an effort to save a New Year's party, Luke takes the keys to an abandoned property that his father owns. Megan learns she is pregnant. At the party, she confronts Isabella, who reveals that Luke was the one who kissed Isabella. When Megan goes to talk to Luke, she finds him bragging about cheating on Megan. After speaking to Isabella, they plan their revenge on Luke, with Megan luring him to Luke's family's cabin. In summer 2000, Megan is arrested for producing the fake IDs. She learns that it was due to Jeff pointing the police in her direction. Luke's father has a private investigator look into Megan, who discovers she has been spending time with Ned. Brent warns her of what his father has discovered. Megan approaches Ned, hoping he will be able to erase her charges and save her scholarship. He admits he cannot help her and grows angry when she tells him about Steve Chambers looking into his past. As Ned begins to look into Steve, Steve arrives, with Brent, looking to confront Ned. Brent encounters Megan as she flees out the back door. Later, Megan receives a call confirming that her scholarship has been rescinded.
18	8	"Confess Your Sins"	Ben Hernandez Bray	Heather Thomason & Diana Glogau	July 17, 2023	0.112
In summer 1999, Megan and Luke have sex together for the first time while Isabella goes to the high school car wash. There, she overhears Brent talking about making sex tapes before he makes a lewd pass at her, despite Steve witnessing, and condoning. In winter 1999, Megan traps Luke at the cabin as she and Isabella drug him and coerce him into confessing his misconduct. He confesses to making the sex tape, but does not know who exposed it at the party before putting Isabella on the spot for having sex with him once before he and Megan got together. Enraged, Isabella takes out a gun and shoots at him. In summer 2000, Megan and Isabella break into Ned's house to search his surveillance footage before Myer catches and arrests them both. Interrogating them separately, he shows Jeff's footage of the New Year's Eve party, and an enhancement showing the two of them conspiring against Luke. Under pressure of being his abductors, Megan and Isabella point the blame at one another.
19	9	"The Miseducation of Luke Chambers"	Laura Nisbet-Peters	Elle Triedman	July 24, 2023	0.165
In October 1999, Luke announces his plan to join the Coast Guard Academy instead of attending Branson, much to his father's disappointment. In November, Brent and his friends harass Luke saying he does not have the courage to make a sex tape. In December, Luke tells Steve of his acceptance into both Branson and the Coast Guard Academy, angering Steve. At the Christmas party, after Steve threatens Luke into attending Branson, a frustrated Luke has an employee play his sex tape with Megan at the party. His relationship with Megan becomes strained. On January 1, 2000, Megan, Isabella, and Luke are in the cabin dealing with the aftermath of the gunshot which only grazed his ear. Isabella warns Luke to keep quiet before fleeing the scene while Megan tends to Luke's injury. Megan reveals she is pregnant and Luke suggests that she undergo an abortion. Hurt, Megan storms out of the cabin without setting Luke free, declaring that she never wants to see him again. Luke frees himself of his bonds and leaves the cabin. He eventually makes it to the dock and pages an unknown number. Some time later, an unknown figure approaches Luke at the dock.
20	10	"Endgame"	Bill Purple	Elle Triedman	July 31, 2023	0.174
In January 2000, the unknown figure is revealed to be Brent. After an argument, Brent pushes Luke into the lake, where he apparently drowns. Steve looks for a way to cover this up as Megan and Isabella hide their involvement with Luke's disappearance. Megan puts up missing person fliers and later gets into an argument with Isabella resulting in her breaking off the friendship. In summer 2000, Megan and Isabella are released from police custody after accusing each other. After Megan rejects Isabella's attempt to renew their friendship, the latter leaves town. Megan is arrested when Myer comes into possession of the tape they made at the cabin with Isabella edited out. Out of guilt, Brent comes forward and turns himself in to the police resulting in Steve's arrest for his corruption and cover-ups. On a plane to Ibiza, Isabella introduces herself to the girl beside her as Lisa and offers to be her tour guide. Megan finds a security camera pointed at the dock where Luke was killed and discovers that Isabella returned there to find Luke barely alive before she purposely uses her foot to drown him and set his body adrift, leaving Megan devastated.

== Production ==
=== Development ===
On September 25, 2019, Freeform gave Last Summer a pilot order. On January 17, 2020, Last Summer was picked to series. The series was created by Bert V. Royal who was also expected to executive produce alongside Jessica Biel, Michelle Purple, and Max Winkler who also directed the pilot. The production companies involved with the series are Entertainment One and Iron Ocean Productions. On May 18, 2020, Last Summer was retitled as Cruel Summer. On June 15, 2021, Freeform renewed the series for a second season. On July 6, 2021, it was reported that Royal has exited the series after the pilot after disagreements with a network executive. On April 21, 2022, Elle Triedman was named as the new showrunner for the second season, replacing Tia Napolitano who boarded the series after Royal left. However, Napolitano is set to remain as an executive producer. It was also reported that the series is an anthology series. On December 8, 2023, Freeform canceled the series after two seasons. On August 8, 2025, it was reported that a third season was in development at Hulu and Freeform, with Olivia Holt returning to star and also serving as an executive producer. Biel and Purple returned as executive producers. Cori Uchida and Adam Lash are set to serve as showrunners and executive producers.

=== Casting ===
On November 13, 2019, Michael Landes, Brooklyn Sudano, Harley Quinn Smith, Chiara Aurelia, Mika Abdalla, Froy Gutierrez, Allius Barnes, Blake Lee, and Nathaniel Ashton were cast in series regular roles. By May 18, 2020, Olivia Holt had replaced Mika Abdalla. On October 30, 2020, Sarah Drew joined the cast in a recurring role. On March 11, 2021, Barrett Carnahan, Andrea Anders, Benjamin J. Cain, and Nicole Bilderback were cast in recurring roles. On April 21, 2022, Sadie Stanley, Eloise Payet, Griffin Gluck, KaDee Strickland, Lisa Yamada and Sean Blakemore joined the cast in starring roles while Paul Adelstein was cast in a recurring role for the second season. On April 27, 2022, Lexi Underwood joined the series, replacing Payet in a recasting. On May 6, 2022, Braeden De La Garza, Nile Bullock, and Jenna Lamb were cast in recurring capacities for the second season.

=== Music ===
Besides Wendy Melvoin and Lisa Coleman serving as the main composers, the series heavily relies on a 1990s-inspired soundtrack.

=== Filming ===
The first season of Cruel Summer was filmed over six months in Dallas, Texas. The second season began filming on April 21, 2022, and concluded on September 7, 2022, in Richmond, British Columbia.

== Broadcast ==
The series premiered on Freeform on April 20, 2021. Following its premiere at the ATX Television Festival in Austin, Texas, on June 2, 2023, the second season premiered on Freeform on June 5, 2023, with two new episodes.

== Reception ==
=== Critical response ===
Cruel Summer received generally positive reviews from critics. On Rotten Tomatoes, the first season holds an approval rating of 94% based on 33 critic reviews, with an average rating of 7.8/10. The website's critics consensus states, "Though it may have a bit too much going on, Cruel Summer's delicious twists and delightful turns from its young stars are never less than entertaining." On Metacritic, it has a weighted average score of 74 out of 100 based on 15 critic reviews, indicating "generally favorable reviews".

Saloni Gajjar of The A.V. Club gave the first season a B and wrote, "Cruel Summer manages to overcome its convoluted storytelling because it finds interesting, grounded ways to explore the impact of society's expectations of these young girls, and how their town and own families contribute to the pressure they face."

On Rotten Tomatoes, the second season has an approval rating of 69% based on 9 critic reviews, with an average rating of 6.6/10. On Metacritic, it holds a weighted average score of 63 out of 100 based on 5 critic reviews, indicating "generally favorable reviews".

=== Ratings ===
On April 30, 2021, Cruel Summer was the most-watched overall series debut ever on Freeform with an average 3.81 million total viewers across multi-platforms for its first week.

==== Season 1 ====
Viewership and ratings per episode of Cruel Summer
No.	Title	Air date	Rating (18–49)	Viewers (millions)	DVR (18–49)	DVR viewers (millions)	Total (18–49)	Total viewers (millions)
1	"Happy Birthday, Jeanette Turner"	April 20, 2021	0.1	0.274	0.1	0.238	0.2	0.512
2	"A Smashing Good Time"	April 20, 2021	0.1	0.218	0.1	0.201	0.2	0.419
3	"Off with a Bang"	April 27, 2021	0.1	0.228	0.1	0.302	0.2	0.530
4	"You Don't Hunt, You Don't Eat"	May 4, 2021	0.1	0.260	0.1	0.338	0.2	0.598
5	"As the Carny Gods Intended"	May 11, 2021	0.1	0.236	0.1	0.341	0.2	0.577
6	"A Ocean Inside Me"	May 18, 2021	0.1	0.261	—N/a	—N/a	—N/a	—N/a
7	"Happy Birthday, Kate Wallis"	May 25, 2021	0.1	0.198	—N/a	—N/a	—N/a	—N/a
8	"Proof"	June 1, 2021	0.2	0.310	—N/a	—N/a	—N/a	—N/a
9	"A Secret of My Own"	June 8, 2021	0.1	0.297	—N/a	—N/a	—N/a	—N/a
10	"Hostile Witness"	June 15, 2021	0.2	0.386	0.1	0.386	0.3	0.766

==== Season 2 ====
Viewership and ratings per episode of Cruel Summer
No.	Title	Air date	Rating (18–49)	Viewers (millions)
1	"Welcome to Chatham"	June 5, 2023	0.1	0.224
2	"Ride or Die"	June 5, 2023	0.0	0.116
3	"Bloody Knuckles"	June 12, 2023	0.1	0.124
4	"Springing a Leak"	June 19, 2023	0.0	0.073
5	"All I Want for Christmas"	June 26, 2023	0.0	0.095
6	"The Plunge"	July 3, 2023	0.1	0.145
7	"It's the End of the World"	July 10, 2023	0.0	0.081
8	"Confess Your Sins"	July 17, 2023	0.0	0.112
9	"The Miseducation of Luke Chambers"	July 24, 2023	0.1	0.165
10	"Endgame"	July 31, 2023	0.1	0.174

=== Accolades ===
Year	Award	Category	Nominee(s)	Result	Ref.
2021	Hollywood Critics Association TV Awards	Best Actress in a Broadcast Network or Cable Series, Drama	Chiara Aurelia	Nominated	
2021	Hollywood Critics Association TV Awards	Best Actress in a Broadcast Network or Cable Series, Drama	Olivia Holt	Nominated	
2021	Hollywood Critics Association TV Awards	Best Cable Series, Drama	Cruel Summer	Won	
2022	Critics' Choice Television Awards	Best Actress in a Drama Series	Chiara Aurelia	Nominated	
