= Ted King (actor) =

American actor

- Born: Theodore William King; October 1, 1965 (age 61); Hollywood, California, U.S.
- Other name: T. W. King
- Occupation: Actor
- Years active: 1985–present
- Spouse: Maya Rodwell (m. 2008)
- Children: 2

Theodore William King (born October 1, 1965) is an American actor, previously credited as T. W. King, best known for starring as Andy Trudeau on the hit-series Charmed during its first season.

== Career ==
King was first known for playing Danny Roberts on the soap opera Loving and The City.

The next year he co-starred in the primetime series Charmed as detective Andy Trudeau. The first season of the series chronicled the adventurous lives of the three Halliwell sister-witches, the "Charmed Ones". King's character Andy, the sisters’ childhood friend, is an inspector who helps the sisters cover up complications of their magic's side effects, hoping to absorb their magical abilities. He was the first season's major male love interest of the leading actress, Shannen Doherty (playing Prue Halliwell), from the October 1998 pilot to the May 1999 finale, when his character sacrificed himself to save Prue and her sisters.

In 2002, King returned to soaps as Luis Alcazar on General Hospital until his character was killed off. However, he later returned to General Hospital as Luis' identical younger brother, Lorenzo Alcazar.

He has had guest-starring roles on such series as Frasier, Sex and the City and Law & Order: Special Victims Unit, among many others.

His feature film credits include The X-Files movie and a role in the independent feature film “Hoodlum & Son.”

King was born in Hollywood, California, and raised in both Los Angeles and Bethesda, Maryland. He received his college degree from The University of California, Santa Barbara, and went on to study film direction at the Tisch School of the Arts at New York University. He has worked in film editing and been involved in New York Theater over the past several years. King is credited with co-founding the Portal Theater Company, an off-Broadway repertory company, where he directed “Beggars in the House of Plenty,” written by John Patrick Shanley.

Off-screen King is active in various charitable organizations, including The Make-A-Wish Foundation.

In December 2008, King was cast as the mysterious character Downey on the hit series Prison Break, making his first appearance on December 22. The role lasted until the end of the season (May 2009).

In February 2011, King began the role of Tomás, long lost brother of Téa Delgado and romantic interest of Blair Cramer, on One Life to Live remaining until the soap's cancellation in January 2012.

In April 2015, King played the role of Corporal Daniel Collins on the NCIS season 12 episode "Lost in Translation".

Entertainment Weekly exclusively reported on June 21, 2021, that King had been cast on his fifth soap opera The Bold and the Beautiful as Jack Finnegan in what will be the part of the development of his son's John Finnegan's (Tanner Novlan) "very dramatic backstory". King's first episodic appearance was on July 30 of that year. He won his first Daytime Emmy Award for Outstanding Guest Performer in a Drama Series for his role as Jack in 2022.

== Personal life ==
In September 2008 King married his girlfriend Maya Rodwell, with whom he became engaged the year before. The couple welcomed their second child, daughter Ava Celeste, on October 15, 2010.

== Filmography ==
=== Film ===
| Year | Film | Role | Notes |
|---|---|---|---|
| 1998 | The X-Files | FBI Agent on Roof | |
| 1998 | Blade | Vampire at rave | |
| 2001 | Interlude | Man | |
| 2001 | Impostor | RMR Operator | |
| 2003 | Hoodlum & Son | Charlie Ellroy | |
| 2011 | Shouting Secrets | Dr. James Matthews | |
| 2016 | Unwanted Guest | Charles Roberts | |
| 2017 | Love at First Glance | Jack | TV film |
| 2023 | Oppenheimer | Bob Bartlett | |

=== Television ===
| Year | Program or series | Role | Notes |
|---|---|---|---|
| 1985 | The Midnight Hour | Death | TV movie |
| 1990 | Tour of Duty | Radio Man | Episode: "Payback" |
| 1993 | Another World | Ron Nettles | |
| 1995 | Loving | Danny Roberts | |
| 1995–1997 | The City | Danny Roberts | |
| 1997–1998 | Timecop | Officer Jack Logan | 9 episodes |
| 1998 | Dawson's Creek | Newscaster Bob | |
| 1998–1999 | Charmed | Inspector Andy Trudeau | Main role |
| 2000 | JAG | Lieutenant Commander Holtsford | Episode: "Flight Risk" |
| 2001 | Sex and the City | Brad | Episode: "Time and Punishment" |
| 2001 | Law & Order: Special Victims Unit | Tony Daricek | Episode: "Stolen" |
| 2002 | Glory Days | Jack Corbin | Episode: "Crowning Glory" |
| 2002 | Frasier | Craig | Episode: "The Guilt Trippers" |
| 2002–2007 | General Hospital | Luis Alcazar/Lorenzo Alcazar | |
| 2003 | The Division | Tom Lazzario | Episode: "Strangers" |
| 2008–2009 | Prison Break | Downey | 7 episodes |
| 2010 | CSI: Miami | Sam Gardner | Episode: "Miami, We Have a Problem" |
| 2011–2012 | One Life to Live | Tomás Delgado | |
| 2013 | Elementary | James Monroe | Episode: "An Unnatural Arrangement" |
| 2013–2014 | Alpha House | Al Hickok | 3 episodes |
| 2015 | NCIS | Corporal Daniel Collins | Episode: "Lost in Translation" |
| 2016 | The Waiting | | |
| 2016 | Hawaii Five-0 | Clark Brighton | Episode: "Ka Haunaele" |
| 2019 | NCIS: Los Angeles | Phil Carmona | Episode: "The One That Got Away" |
| 2021–present | The Bold and the Beautiful | Jack Finnegan | Recurring role |
| 2022 | Angelyne | Mitch | Episode: "Glow in the Dark Queen of the Universe" |
| 2024 | Blue Bloods | Lieutenant Cooper | Episode: "Without Fear or Favor" |

== Awards and nominations ==
| Year | Award | Category | Work | Result | Ref. |
|---|---|---|---|---|---|
| 1996 | Soap Opera Digest Awards | Outstanding Younger Leading Actor | Loving | Nominated | |
| 1997 | Soap Opera Digest Awards | Outstanding Younger Leading Actor | The City | Nominated | |
| 2005 | Soap Opera Digest Awards | Favorite Villain | General Hospital | Won | |
| 2022 | Daytime Emmy Award | Outstanding Guest Performer in a Drama Series | The Bold and the Beautiful | Won | |
