= List of The Bold and the Beautiful characters introduced in the 2020s =

List of The Bold and the Beautiful characters that debuted in the 2020s

The Bold and the Beautiful is a CBS American soap opera that first aired on March 23, 1987. This is a list of characters that debuted or will debut on the show between January 2020 and December 2029, in order of first appearance, that do not have their own page. Penny Escobar, the friend and doctor of Sally Spectra (Courtney Hope), was introduced in February 2020. John "Finn" Finnegan (Tanner Novlan), a love interest for Steffy Forrester (Jacqueline MacInnes Wood), was introduced later that year, as was Paris Buckingham (Diamond White), the sister of Zoe Buckingham (Kiara Barnes). Jack (Ted King) and Li Finnegan (Naomi Matsuda) were introduced in 2021 as the parents of Finn. Grace Buckingham (Cassandra Creech), the mother of Zoe and Paris, debuted in January 2022. In September 2023, Luna Nozawa (Lisa Yamada) was introduced alongside her mother, Poppy Nozawa (Romy Park), later that month. 2024 featured the debut of Clint Howard as Tom Starr, a former local musician. Murielle Hillaire made her first appearance as perfume designer Daphne Rose in January 2025. Additionally, multiple other characters have appeared.

== Penny Escobar ==
Penny Escobar was played by Monica Ruiz from February 7, 2020, to August 5 of that year.

Penny is introduced as the friend and doctor of Sally Spectra (Courtney Hope). Penny dislikes her job and wishes to be a fashion designer. When Sally visits her in a professional capacity due to seemingly struggling with mystery symptoms, she tells her and Katie Logan (Heather Tom) that Sally has a month to live and to build a strong support system, but encourages her to seek a second medical opinion. However, it is revealed that Penny is helping Sally fake a terminal illness in an attempt to reunite Sally with her ex-boyfriend, Wyatt Spencer (Darin Brooks), with Sally promising to help Penny become a fashion design at Forrester Creations in exchange. When Wyatt's girlfriend Flo Fulton (Katrina Bowden) finds out about the scheme, Penny knocks her unconscious. Sally and Penny keep Flo hostage tied to a heater in order to prevent the truth from coming out, but Flo is able to get a message to Wyatt and is rescued.

Richard Simms from Soaps She Knows referred to the character as "Doctor Demento".

== Paris Buckingham ==
Paris Buckingham
- The Bold and the Beautiful character
- Portrayed by: Diamond White
- Duration: 2020–2024
- First appearance: November 2, 2020
- Last appearance: July 9, 2024
- Created by: Bradley Bell
In-universe information
- Occupation: Social worker
- Father: Reese Buckingham
- Mother: Grace Buckingham
- Sisters: Zoe Buckingham

Paris Buckingham, played by Diamond White, made her first appearance on November 2, 2020. She was introduced as the sister of established character Zoe Buckingham (Kiara Barnes) and the daughter of Reese Buckingham (Wayne Brady). The CBS website refers to Paris as "benevolent" and "vivacious" with a "heart-of-gold".

Paris arrives to see her sister, Zoe. She begins flirting with Zende Forrester Dominguez (Delon de Metz), which irritates Zoe as she and Zende are attracted to each other despite her being engaged to Carter Walton (Lawrence Saint-Victor). Paris accepts a job at Forrester Creations, despite Zoe telling her not to, and goes on a date with Zende, which Zoe tries to sabotage by spiking her drink with laxatives. After finding out that Carter has been having an affair with Quinn Fuller (Rena Sofer), Paris informs Zoe, who leaves town. Paris continues her romance with Zende and moves in with John "Finn" Finnegan (Tanner Novlan) and Steffy Forrester (Jacqueline MacInnes Wood) but leaves after developing a crush on Finn. She rejects Thomas Forrester (Matthew Atkinson), her housemate and a cousin of Zende, when he falls for her and tries to spring a romantic dinner on her. When Paris finds out that Zende wants to propose to her, she tells him that she is enjoying being single and encourages him to see other people too. Paris then kisses Carter. Paris is happy when her mother, Grace Buckingham (Cassandra Creech), moves to town. Grace is unhappy with Paris not being with Zende and tells her to accept if he proposes again. Paris declares her love for Carter and breaks up with Zende. Carter proposes to Paris and she accepts, despite being surprised at the speed of it, but is devastated on their wedding day when Carter leaves her for Quinn at the altar. A heartbroken Paris is comforted by Grace and Zende, the latter later continuing to collaborate with her at Forrester Creations.

Soap Opera News placed White's portrayal of Paris eighth on its list of the "Top 15 Soap Newcomers of 2020". However, Richard Simms and Charlie Mason from Soaps She Knows named Paris as the "Worst-Written Character" of 2022 in American Soap Operas, commenting that "One day, The Bold and the Beautiful would have us believe that Paris just wants to settle down like Steffy and Finn. The next, it wants us to buy that she's savoring being single and ready to mingle. Two weeks later, she was 100 percent into the idea of marrying Carter. Whiplash, much?" Chris Eades from Soaps In Depth noted how Paris had "already made a place for herself at Forrester" despite being relatively new. In 2021, Carol Cassada from Showbiz Cheat Sheet noted how Paris was initially popular with fans, being viewed as a "heroine", but the popularity decreased due to her "tendency to jump from man to man" and viewers not understanding the "fascination" with the character. Cassada also noted how Paris was receiving a lot of air time and was initially viewed as a "fan favourite" but whose actions had become of a "villain". The following year, Cassada commented that Paris "waffles between men" and noted that some fans did not feel sympathy for Paris after being stood up by Carter.

== Jack Finnegan ==
Jack Finnegan
- The Bold and the Beautiful character
- Portrayed by: Ted King
- Duration: 2021–present
- First appearance: July 30, 2021
- Created by: Bradley Bell
In-universe information
- Occupation: Lawyer
- Wife: Li Finnegan (divorced)
- Sons: John Finnegan (Note: Jack and Li adopted Finn, but it is later revealed that Jack is Finn's biological father as well.)
- Grandsons: Hayes Finnegan
- Granddaughters: Luna Nozawa
- Nephews: Greg Finnegan

Jack Finnegan, played by Ted King, made his first appearance on July 30, 2021. He was introduced alongside his wife, Li (Naomi Matsuda), as the "adoptive" father of John "Finn" Finnegan (Tanner Novlan), although it is later revealed that he is his biological father. The news of King's and Matsuda's casting was announced in June 2021, with it being teased that their arrival would reveal Finn's "very dramatic backstory." They had begun filming on June 9 of that year. King returned the following year and began reappearing from July 7, 2022. In July 2024, People made an announcement that King would return as Jack on the series to take part in a "dramatic storyline involving Li and his son." His return airdate was July 1st.

Jack arrives for Finn's wedding to Steffy Forrester (Jacqueline MacInnes Wood) and to meet his grandson, Hayes Finnegan. At the wedding, Jack is nervous about their wedding being public information and his fears are proved right when Sheila Carter (Kimberlin Brown), who has terrorised Steffy's families for decades, arrives at the reception and reveals that she is Finn's mother. It is later revealed that Jack had an affair Sheila years prior, when she was working at the hospital with Li, and that he is the biological father of Finn. He reveals the truth to Li and they tell Finn, who struggles to forgive his father. Li and Jack separate. Jack grieves Finn after he is presumed dead after being shot by Sheila, but it is revealed that he is still alive. When Sheila is arrested for shooting Finn and Steffy, Jack visits Sheila after she emails him. She tries to play with his emotions and reminds him of their relationship but Jack refuses to help her.

For his portrayal of Jack, King won the Daytime Emmy Award for Outstanding Guest Performer in a Drama Series at the 2022 ceremony. Charlie Mason and Richard Simms from Soaps She Knows called the reveal of Jack being Finn's biological father as the "Worst Reveal" of 2021 in Soap Operas, commenting that the soap "dragged out the moment that Finn learned that his adoptive father was also his biological father for so long."

== Li Finnegan ==
Li Finnegan
- The Bold and the Beautiful character
- Portrayed by: Naomi Matsuda
- Duration: 2021–present
- First appearance: August 2, 2021
- Created by: Bradley Bell
In-universe information
- Other names: Li Nozawa
- Occupation: Surgeon
- Sisters: Poppy Nozawa
- Husband: Jack Finnegan (divorced)
- Adoptive sons: John Finnegan
- Grandsons: Hayes Finnegan (adoptive)
- Granddaughters: Luna Nozawa (adoptive)
- Nieces: Luna Nozawa

Li Finnegan, played by Naomi Matsuda, made her first appearance on August 2, 2021. She is introduced as the adoptive mother of John "Finn" Finnegan (Tanner Novlan), and arrives for his wedding to Steffy Forrester (Jacqueline MacInnes Wood), alongside her husband, Jack (Ted King). The news of King's and Matsuda's casting was announced in June 2021, with it being teased that their arrival would reveal Finn's "very dramatic backstory." They had begun filming on June 9 of that year. Matsuda was reported to have made a "fiery exit" when Li was seemingly killed off on June 22, 2022, however it was later revealed that the character was alive when Matsuda began reappearing from July 21 of that year.

Li arrives with Jack for Finn's wedding to Steffy, whom she takes a liking to, and to meet her new grandson, Hayes Finnegan. At the wedding, Finn's biological mother, Sheila Carter (Kimberlin Brown), who has terrorised Steffy's family for years, arrives to meet Finn, shocking everyone. Jack later confesses to Li that he is Finn's biological father as he had an affair with Sheila whilst married to Li. A heartbroken Li is devastated by the lies and encourages Jack to tell Finn the truth. Finn comforts his mother after the revelation, and she returns home.

Li returns the following year after Finn and Steffy are shot by Sheila, with Finn supposedly having died. She checks on Steffy, who is in critical condition, and refuses to allow Sheila to see Finn one last time. Li then finds out that Sheila shot him. Li refuses Steffy and her family's help in organising the memorial service. It is then revealed that Finn is still alive but in a coma, with Li nursing him at home and making everyone believe he is dead, having signed his death certificate. Li is overjoyed when he begins to wake up but the pair are discovered by Sheila, who Li had been trying desperately to keep Finn away from. Li tries outsmart Sheila and calls the police, leading to Sheila attacking her. Li escapes and a car chase follows, leading to Sheila hitting Li's car, which starts burning and falls into the water. Li is presumed dead and Sheila takes over looking after Finn.

Weeks later, just as Sheila tells an awake Finn about Li's death, Li is revealed to be alive and she is discovered by Bill Spencer Jr. (Don Diamont) near a trash can. She is badly traumatised and amnesiac, but Bill's son Liam Spencer (Scott Clifton) recognises Li and tells Bill who she is. Li is able to regain her memory and ability to speak and tells Bill and Liam that Finn is alive. Finn and Li reunite and fall into each other's arms. Finn is grateful to his mother for keeping him alive and whilst Steffy is also grateful, she is angry by Li not telling her that he was alive. Li explains her reasons and refuses to apologise, saying that Finn had a normal life before meeting Steffy. Li meets up with Bill, who she is grateful for saving her life, and explains that she and Jack are no longer together due to his deception. Sheila fakes her death and lurks at Li and Finn when they are at a restaurant together. When Sheila is discovered, Li visits her in prison and tells her off. When Sheila has a heart attack and Li is assigned to be her doctor, she refuses to help Sheila and wants to see her die, but Finn saves her. Li later tells Finn off when he calls Sheila a hero due to her saving Steffy's stepdaughter from drowning.

For her portrayal of Li, Matsuda was nominated for the Daytime Emmy Award for Outstanding Guest Performer in a Drama Series at the 2022 ceremony, but lost out to King's portrayal of Jack.

Referring to the character's presumed death, Richard Simms and Charlie Mason from Soaps She Knows said that Li had the "Best Swan Song" of 2022, saying that she "got one hell of a send-off, going up in flames — literally! — while being pursued by Finn's other mother, lunatic about town Sheila." They also referred to Li as "fiery" and referred to the revelation that she "had fooled everyone into thinking he [Fin] was dead even as she worked to bring him back from the brink" as the "Best May Sweeps Reveal" which made fans "over the moon".

== Grace Buckingham ==
Grace Buckingham
- The Bold and the Beautiful character
- Portrayed by: Cassandra Creech
- Duration: 2022, 2024–2025
- First appearance: January 10, 2022
- Last appearance: August 8, 2025
- Created by: Bradley Bell
In-universe information
- Occupation: Doctor
- Husband: Reese Buckingham (backstory)
- Daughters: Zoe Buckingham; Paris Buckingham

Grace Buckingham, played by Cassandra Creech, made her first appearance on January 10, 2022. She was introduced as the mother of established characters Zoe (Kiara Barnes) and Paris Buckingham (Diamond White). Creech called being on the soap "extraordinary" and called being cast an "aligning of the stars" as "everything just fell into place". Creech also said that she had a "good" chemistry read with White in the casting process.

Grace arrives and surprises her daughter, Paris. She meets Paris' boyfriend, Zende Forrester Dominguez (Delon de Metz). Paris invites Grace to live with her, which she accepts. Grace disapproves of Paris and Zende's open relationship and is disappointed that they are not exclusive. She catches Paris kissing Carter Walton (Lawrence Saint-Victor) and confronts him, telling Carter she would rather Paris be with Zende. Grace blackmails Carter into breaking things off with Paris, but Paris later breaks up with Zende and becomes engaged to Carter, which Grace is disappointed and suspicious about. Grace attends their wedding and supports Paris when Carter leaves her for Quinn Fuller (Rena Sofer) at the ceremony. Grace continues working as a doctor in the Los Angeles, and Katie Logan (Heather Tom) visits her as a patient.

Richard Simms and Charlie Mason from Soaps She Knows commented that Grace had the "Biggest Missed Opportunity" of 2022 in American Soap Operas, saying that despite learning that Grace was "both a doctor and single", the character "was given nothing to do but fret about her daughter's love life. Worse, once Paris was left at the altar by Carter, Grace vanished entirely!"

For her role as Grace, Creech was nominated for the Daytime Emmy Award for Outstanding Guest Performer in a Drama Series in 2023.

== Luna Nozawa ==
Luna Nozawa
- Portrayed by: Lisa Yamada
- Duration: 2023–2025
- First appearance: September 13, 2023
- Last appearance: November 20, 2025
- Created by: Michael Minnis
- Introduced by: Bradley Bell
In-universe information
- Other names: Luna Finnegan; Sunshine
- Occupation: Student; Fashion intern
- Father: John Finnegan
- Mother: Poppy Nozawa
- Stepmother: Steffy Forrester
- Half-brothers: Hayes Finnegan
- Grandfathers: Jack Finnegan
- Grandmothers: Sheila Carter; Li Finnegan (adoptive)
- Uncles: Ryder Callahan
- Aunts: Li Finnegan; Daisy Carter; Mary Carter Warwick; Diana Carter
- First cousins: Lucy Romalotti

Luna Nozawa, played by Lisa Yamada, made her first appearance on September 13, 2023. Her casting was announced on September 1 of that same year, with it being reported that Yamada had already begun filming for the regular role. Curtis Harding from Soaps She Knows expressed excitement over Luna's arrival and speculated that she may act as a love interest for R.J. Forrester (Joshua Hoffman). TVLine reported that Luna would be a fashion design college student who arrives at Forrester Creations "surrounded by mystery" and "harboring" a "secret".

During a phone call between Luna and her mom, Poppy (Romy Park), Luna was revealed to be the niece of Li Finnegan (Naomi Matsuda) and the cousin of John Finnegan (Tanner Novlan). Poppy implores Luna to resign from her position at Forrester Creations, distance herself from the Forresters, and to come back home. After taking a paternity test it was revealed that Bill Spencer is her father; however, Tom Starr also claims paternity. Soon after Tom is found dead. Bill's ex wife Katie Logan (Heather Tom) thinks Bill isn't Luna's father and Poppy was the one who killed Tom along with his co-worker Hollis. Katie urges Bill to do another paternity test. This time it comes back negative and Luna kisses Bill.

Charlie Mason and Richard Simms from Soaps She Knows wrote that Luna had the "Smoothest Introduction" in American soap operas in 2023, commenting that "Luna didn't just make an entrance, the Bold & Beautiful newbie walked into the Forrester mansion with a great personality, an intriguing backstory and a potential love interest in RJ, who was in desperate need of something — or someone — to give him a purpose".

== Poppy Nozawa ==
Poppy Nozawa
- Portrayed by: Romy Park
- Duration: 2023–2025
- First appearance: October 6, 2023
- Last appearance: November 21, 2025
- Created by: Michael Minnis
- Introduced by: Bradley Bell
In-universe information
- Other names: Penelope Nozawa
- Occupation: Artist; Dancer
- Sisters: Li Finnegan
- Daughters: Luna Nozawa
- Nephews: John Finnegan (adoptive)

Poppy Nozawa, played by Romy Park, made her first appearance on October 6, 2023. Poppy is the mother of Luna Nozawa (Yamada), younger sister of Li Finnegan (Matsuda) and aunt of John Finnegan (Novlan).

Poppy is first seen in a phone call with her daughter, warning Luna to stay away from the Forrester family and pleads her to return home. It is later revealed that Poppy and Li's strained relationship resulted in the separation of cousins Finn and Li during their youth. This discord is exacerbated in the present as both Poppy and Luna adamantly refuse to relocate from Los Angeles upon Li's request. Subsequently, it is revealed that Poppy and Bill Spencer (Don Diamont) had previously crossed paths years ago at a music festival, leading to an intimate night together. The pair rekindle their romance and go on dates. Poppy later reveals that Bill is Luna's father; however, Tom Starr (a homeless man) also claims paternity. Tom later dies mysteriously of a drug overdose. Poppy is arrested on suspicion of murdering Tom to hide the truth of Luna's paternity. After taking another test, it is revealed that Finn is Luna's biological father.

== Daphne Rose ==
Daphne Rose
- Portrayed by: Murielle Hilaire
- Duration: 2025–present
- First appearance: January 7, 2025
- Created by: Michael Minnis
- Introduced by: Bradley Bell
In-universe information
- Other names: Nose of Paris
- Occupation: Perfumer
- Spouse: Carter Walton (m. 2026)

Daphne Rose, portrayed by Murielle Hilaire, made her first appearance on January 7, 2025. She departed on May 26, and returned during the July 23 episode.

Daphne is introduced as a famous perfume designer from Paris and it is later revealed that she is working with Steffy Forrester (Jacqueline MacInnes Wood) as part of her scheme. Daphne attempts to seduce Carter Walton (Lawrence Saint-Victor) but ends up falling for him. In 2026, Daphne marries Carter.

Chris Eades of Soap Opera Digest described Daphne as "intriguing" and suggested that she had made "quite a splash" on the soap.

== Others ==
| Character | Episode date(s) | Portrayer | Details | Ref(s). |
|---|---|---|---|---|
| Lucy | November 23, 2022; March 22, 2023 | Linda Purl | Lucy is the girlfriend of Stephen Logan (Patrick Duffy). She meets his three daughters for the first time and is happy that they are accepting of her. She leaves early in order to give Stephen time alone to spend with Brooke Logan (Katherine Kelly Lang), who is dealing with a heartbreak. She returns again in March 2023. | |
| Andrea Bocelli | June 26, 2023 | Himself | Veronica is a friend of Brooke Logan (Katherine Kelly Lang) and they arrange for her husband, Andrea, to do a special performance of "A Te" for Ridge Forrester (Thorsten Kaye) after he reunites with Brooke. Andrea's daughter also appears. | |
| Veronica Bocelli | June 26, 2023 | Herself | Veronica is a friend of Brooke Logan (Katherine Kelly Lang) and they arrange for her husband, Andrea, to do a special performance of "A Te" for Ridge Forrester (Thorsten Kaye) after he reunites with Brooke. Andrea's daughter also appears. | |
| Virginia Bocelli | June 26, 2023 | Herself | Veronica is a friend of Brooke Logan (Katherine Kelly Lang) and they arrange for her husband, Andrea, to do a special performance of "A Te" for Ridge Forrester (Thorsten Kaye) after he reunites with Brooke. Andrea's daughter also appears. | |
| Colin Colby | October 3 – November 7, 2023 | Justiin Davis | Colin is the physician of Eric Forrester (John McCook), whom he consults after experiencing tremors. | |
| Tom Starr | April 26 – July 1, 2024 | Clint Howard | A mysterious homeless man who gives clues to John Finnegan (Tanner Novlan) and Deacon Sharpe (Sean Kanan) in their quest to find Sheila Carter (Kimberlin Brown). Tom later claims that he, not Bill Spencer, is Luna's biological father, after which he mysteriously dies; Poppy is later arrested on suspicion that she murdered Tom so that she can continue her relationship with the much-richer Bill. | |
| Inmate | October 2025 – present | Melissa Fosse-Dunne | An inmate in the same prison that Luna Nozawa (Lisa Yamada) is in. She beats Luna so that Luna can try to get out of prison. | |
| Dr Taverez | October 22, 2025 | Sandra Gutierrez | A doctor who checks out a pregnant Luna Nozawa (Lisa Yamada) after she is beaten in prison. Luna tries to convince her that she and her baby are in danger. | |
| Spencer Pratt | April 24, 2025 | Himself | Attendees of the Forrester fashion show. | |
| Markell Washington | April 24, 2025 | Himself | Attendees of the Forrester fashion show. | |
| Heidi Montag | April 24, 2025 | Herself | Attendees of the Forrester fashion show. | |

== See also ==
- John Finnegan (The Bold and the Beautiful)
