= Cassandra Creech =

American actress

- Born: Clayton, North Carolina, U.S.
- Occupation: Actress
- Years active: 1994–present
- Spouse: Jonny Bowden (1998-?) (div)

Cassandra Creech is an American actress. She played Denise Maynard in the CBS soap opera As the World Turns from 1998 to 2001, and Grace Buckingham on the CBS soap opera The Bold and the Beautiful (2022, 2024, 2025), for which she received Daytime Emmy Award nomination for Guest Performer in a Drama Series in 2023.

== Life and career ==
Creech was born in Clayton, North Carolina. She graduated from the University of North Carolina School of the Arts and spent a year at the British Academy of Dramatic Arts. In 1994, she made her daytime television debut as a replacement for Michelle Hurd in the role of Dana Kramer on Another World. In 1998, she married a nutritionist and health writer Jonny Bowden, they lived in New York City. From 1998 to 2001 she starred as Denise Maynard in the CBS soap opera As the World Turns.

Creech appeared in films Disappearing Acts (2000) and I'm Through with White Girls (2007), as well guest-starred on New York Undercover, CSI: Miami, and NCIS. She had a recurring role in the NBC series Third Watch from 2002 to 2003. She returned to daytime playing two different roles on Days of Our Lives. She guest-starred on soap in 2010 and recurred in 2018. In 2022, she was cast as Dr. Grace Buckingham in the CBS soap opera, The Bold and the Beautiful. In 2023, Creech received Daytime Emmy Award nomination for Guest Performer in a Drama Series for her performance.

== Filmography ==
Year	Title	Role	Notes
1994	Another World	Dana Kramer	Replacement
1996	New York Undercover	Peaches	Episode: "Checkmate"
1998–2001	As the World Turns	Denise Maynard	Series regular
2000	Disappearing Acts	Teri	
2002–2003	Third Watch	Joy	4 episodes
2005	CSI: Miami	Officer	Episode: "Three-Way"
2006	Cyxork 7	Nyree Tannis	
2007	Crossing Jordan	Ms. Caullings	Episode: "33 Bullets"
2007	I'm Through with White Girls	Tamiko	
2008	Dirt	Sherry	Episode: "God Bless the Child"
2010	Days of Our Lives	Keisha	2 episodes
2012	The Catch	Lisa	Short film
2018	Days of Our Lives	Diane	4 episodes
2019	NCIS	Amy Tano	Episode: "Hail & Farewell"
2022, 2024, 2025	The Bold and the Beautiful	Dr. Grace Buckingham	Recurring role Nominated — Daytime Emmy Award for Outstanding Guest Performer in a Drama Series (2023)
