= Daytime Emmy Award for Outstanding Guest Performer in a Drama Series =

Annual television acting award

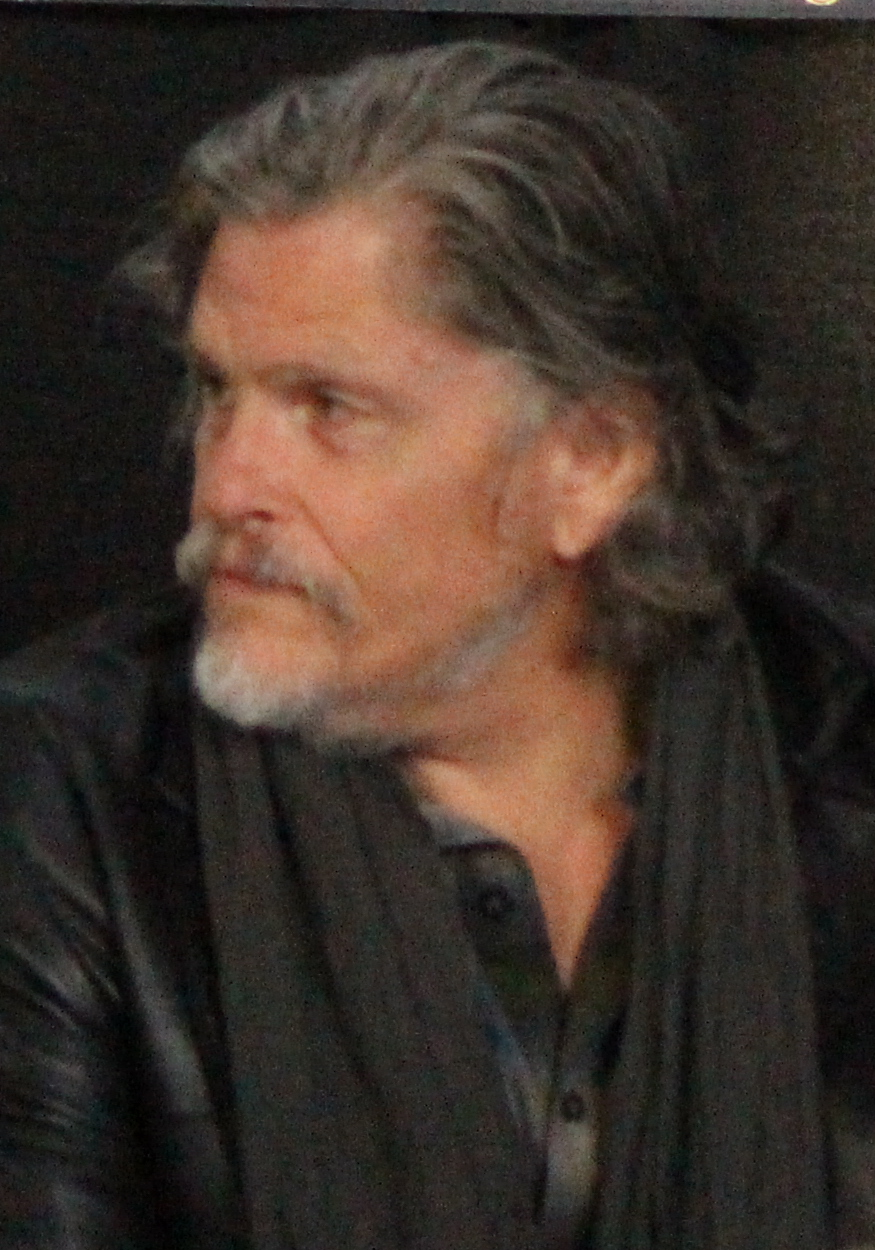
- The 2026 recipient: Jeff Kober
- Awarded for: Outstanding Performance by a Guest Actor or Actress in a Drama Series
- Country: United States
- Presented by: NATAS; ATAS
- First award: 1980
- Currently held by: Jeff Kober, General Hospital (2025)
- Website: theemmys.tv/daytime

The Daytime Emmy Award for Outstanding Guest Performer in a Drama Series is an award presented annually by the National Academy of Television Arts and Sciences (NATAS) and the Academy of Television Arts & Sciences (ATAS). It was first awarded at the 7th Daytime Emmy Awards in 1980, and is given to honor an actor/actress who has delivered an outstanding performance in a guest role while working within the daytime drama industry.

Originally introduced as the Outstanding Cameo Appearance in a Drama Series category, it was later renamed Outstanding Guest Star in a Drama Series in 1987, when the award was re-introduced after a brief absence. After being retired again for several decades, the category returned in 2015 under the new title of Outstanding Special Guest Performer in a Drama Series. This reintroduction, which came 28 years after its last presentation, established a stricter eligibility requirement: "the performer's character must have premiered in the current eligibility (calendar) year, and have made a limited number of appearances in a significant role".

In 2018, the award adopted its current title, Outstanding Guest Performer in a Drama Series. At the same time, the eligibility criteria were broadened, permitting submissions from actors "playing characters they either played before, or are newly cast," thus opening the category to both returning veterans and fresh additions to the cast. Beginning in 2026, a new eligibility criterion applies to the category: performers may not appear in more than 19% of a series' episodes released for the first time within the eligibility period.

The award was first presented to Hugh McPhillips for his role as Hugh Pearson on Days of Our Lives. Since its inception, the award has been given to thirteen actors. General Hospital is the program with the most awarded actors, with six. In 2015, Donna Mills, Fred Willard, and Ray Wise made Daytime Emmy Award history by tying in the category, marking the first three-way tie in its history. Alley Mills has won the award twice, which is more than any other performer. In 2024, Dick Van Dyke became the oldest performer to win a Daytime Emmy Award when he won for his role as Mystery Man/Timothy Robicheaux on Days of Our Lives at 98 years old. As of the 2026 ceremony, Jeff Kober is the most recent winner in this category for his role as Cyrus Renault on General Hospital.

== Winners and nominees ==
Listed below are the winners of the award for each year, as well as the other nominees.

Table key
‡	Indicates the winner

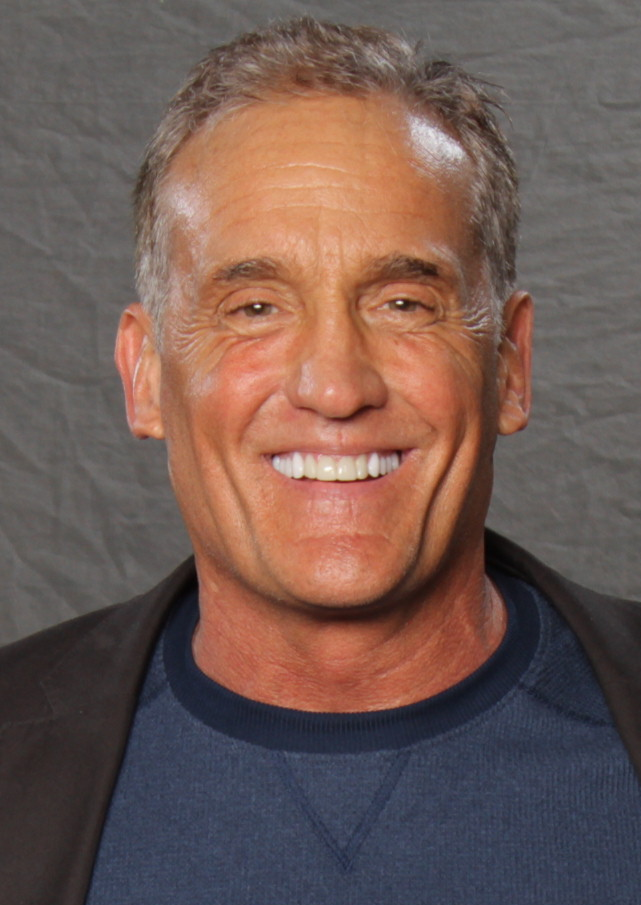
John Wesley Shipp won in 1987 for his performance on Santa Barbara

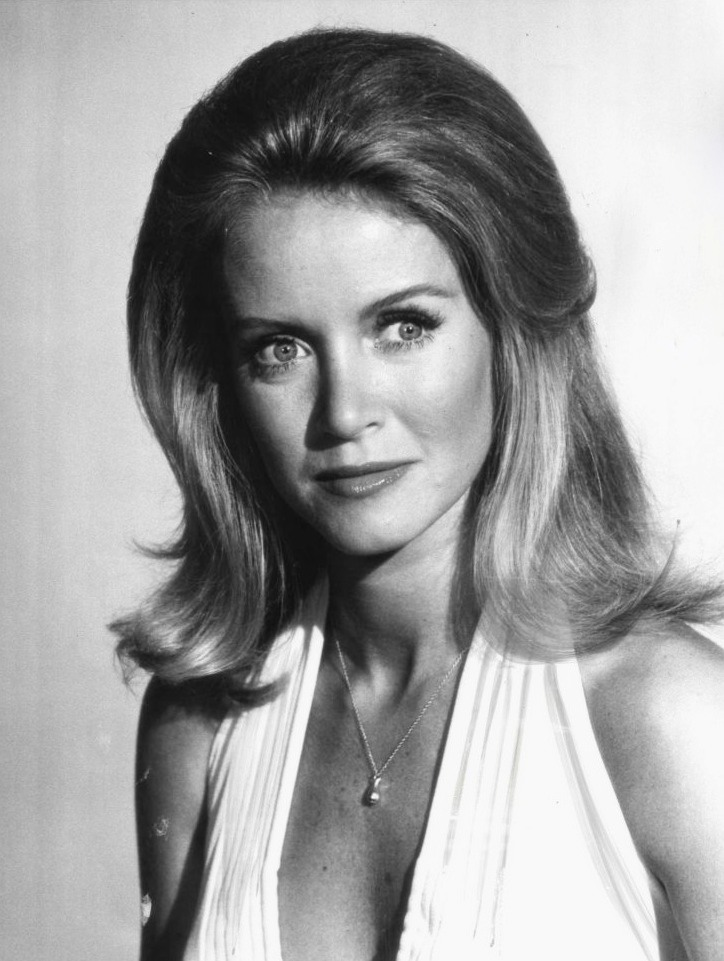
Donna Mills won in 2015 for her role on General Hospital, and was one of three recipients of the award that year.

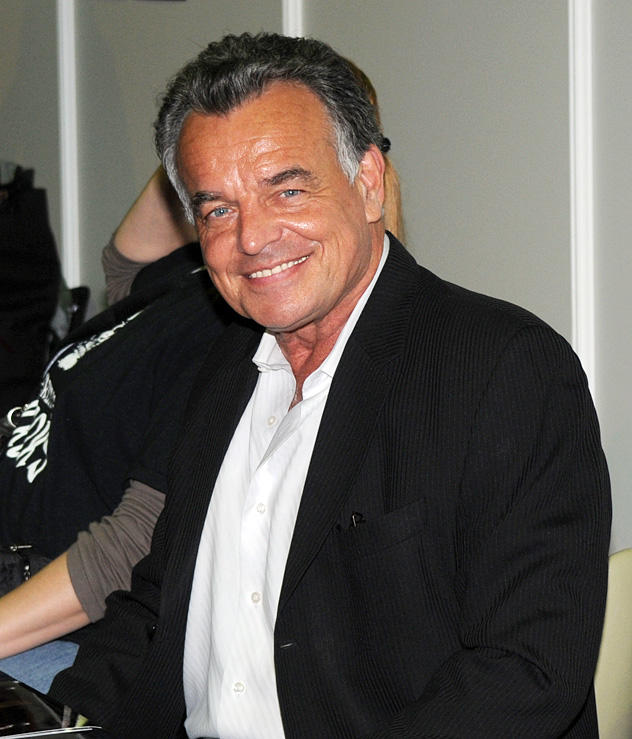
Ray Wise won in 2015 for his role on The Young and the Restless, and was one of three recipients of the award that year.

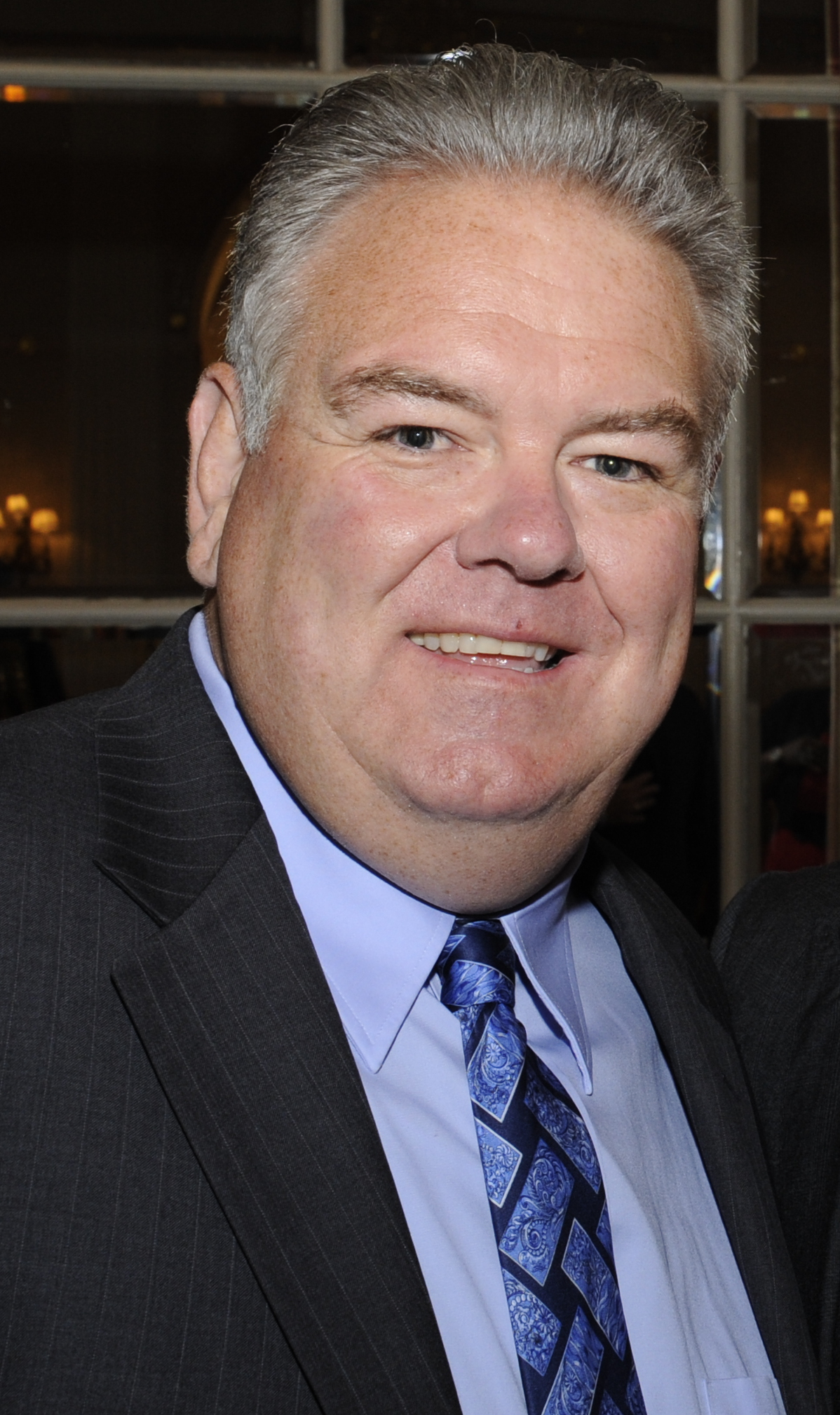
Jim O'Heir won in 2018 for his role as Matt Cannistra on The Bold and the Beautiful.

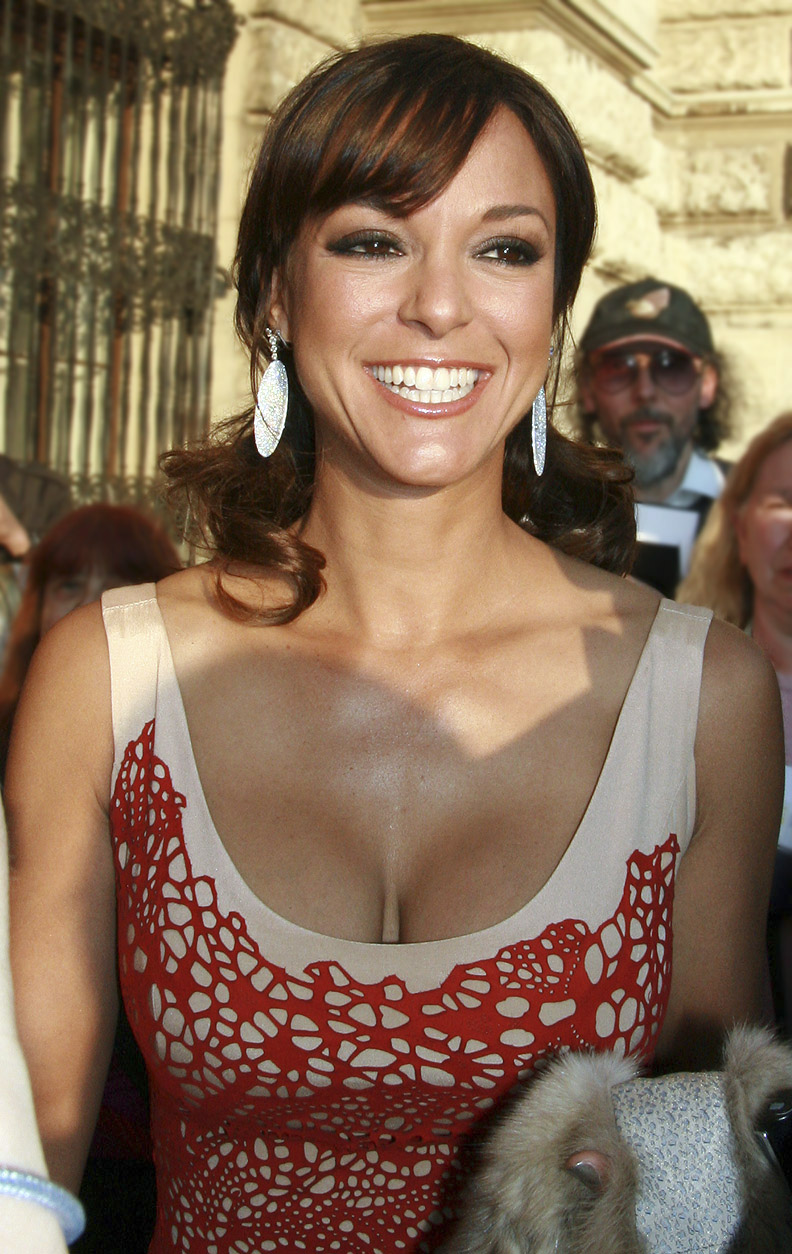
Eva LaRue won in 2020 for her role as Celeste Rosales on The Young and the Restless.

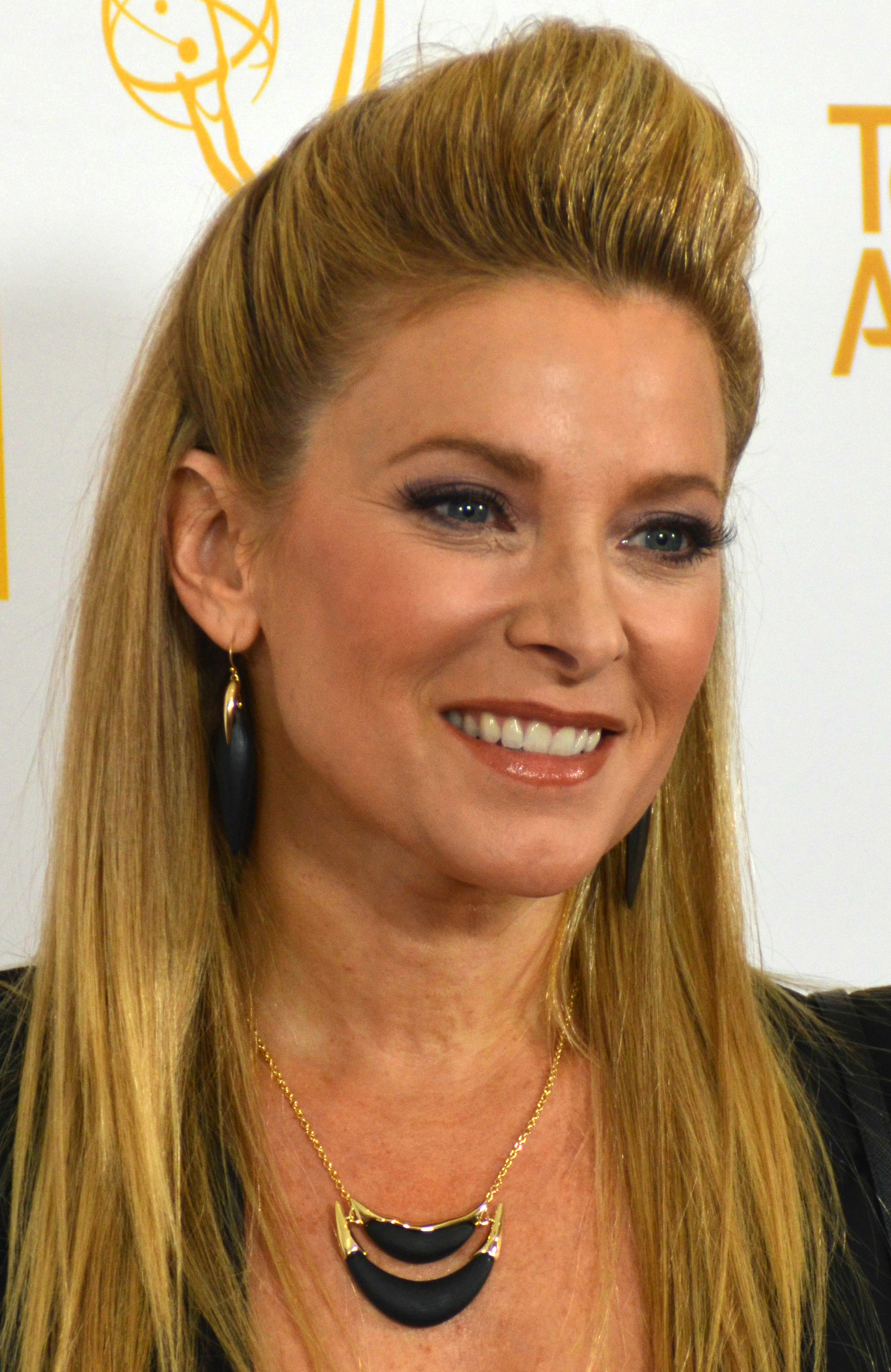
Cady McClain won in 2021 for her role as Jennifer Horton on Days of Our Lives.

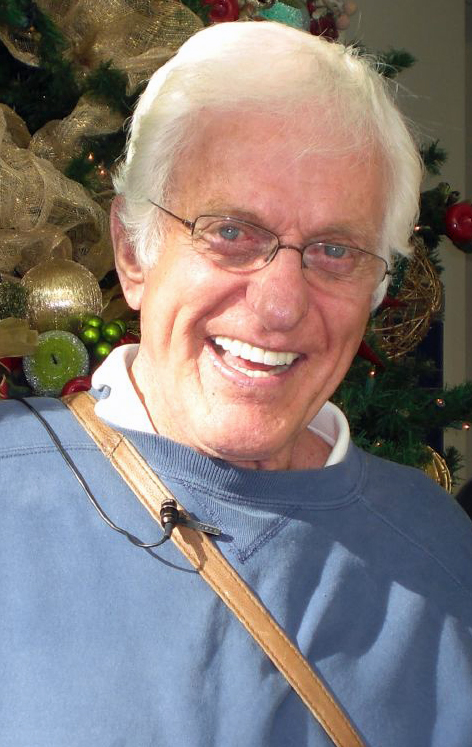
Dick Van Dyke won in 2024 for his role as Mystery Man/Timothy Robicheaux on Days of Our Lives.

=== 1980s ===
Year	Performer	Program	Role	Network	Ref.
1980 (7th)	Hugh McPhillips ‡	Days of Our Lives	Hugh Pearson	NBC	
1980 (7th)	Sammy Davis Jr.	One Life to Live	Chip Warren	ABC	
1980 (7th)	Joan Fontaine	Ryan's Hope	Page Williams	ABC	
1980 (7th)	Kathryn Harrow	The Doctors	Pat Reyerson	ABC	
1980 (7th)	Eli Mintz	All My Children	Locksmith	ABC	
1987 (14th)	John Wesley Shipp ‡	Santa Barbara	Martin Ellis	NBC	
1987 (14th)	Pamela Blair	All My Children	Maida Andrews	ABC	
1987 (14th)	Eileen Heckart	One Life to Live	Ruth Perkins	ABC	
1987 (14th)	Celeste Holm	Loving	Clara and Lydia Woodhouse	ABC	
1987 (14th)	Terrence Mann	As the World Turns	Jester	CBS	

=== 2010s ===
Year	Performer	Program	Role	Network	Ref.
2015 (42nd)	Donna Mills ‡	General Hospital	Madeline Reeves	ABC	
2015 (42nd)	Fred Willard ‡	The Bold and the Beautiful	John Forrester	CBS	
2015 (42nd)	Ray Wise ‡	The Young and the Restless	Ian Ward	CBS	
2015 (42nd)	Meredith Baxter	The Young and the Restless	Maureen Russell	CBS	
2015 (42nd)	Sally Kellerman	The Young and the Restless	Constance Bingham	CBS	
2015 (42nd)	Linda Elena Tovar	General Hospital	Rosalie Martinez	ABC	
2016 (43rd)	Obba Babatundé ‡	The Bold and the Beautiful	Julius Avant	CBS	
2016 (43rd)	Anna Maria Horsford	The Bold and the Beautiful	Vivienne Avant	CBS	
2016 (43rd)	Adam Leadbeater	Days of Our Lives	Dr. Seth Malcom	NBC	
2016 (43rd)	Frank Runyeon	The Young and the Restless	Angel	CBS	
2016 (43rd)	Dee Wallace	General Hospital	Patricia Spencer	ABC	
2017 (44th)	Jim O'Heir ‡	The Bold and the Beautiful	Matt Cannistra	CBS	
2017 (44th)	Tobin Bell	Days of Our Lives	Yo Ling	NBC	
2017 (44th)	Don Harvey	General Hospital	Tom Baker	ABC	
2017 (44th)	Monica Horan	The Bold and the Beautiful	Kieran Cannistra	CBS	
2017 (44th)	Nichelle Nichols	The Young and the Restless	Lucinda Winters	CBS	
2018 (45th)
2018 (45th)	Vernee Watson ‡	General Hospital	Stella Henry	ABC	
2018 (45th)	Ryan Ashton	The Young and the Restless	Zach Sinnett	CBS	
2018 (45th)	Robb Derringer	Days of Our Lives	Scooter Nelson	NBC	
2018 (45th)	John Enos	Days of Our Lives	Roger	NBC	
2018 (45th)	Morgan Fairchild	Days of Our Lives	Anjelica Deveraux	NBC	
2019 (46th)
2019 (46th)	Patricia Bethune ‡	General Hospital	Nurse Mary Pat	ABC	
2019 (46th)	Philip Anthony-Rodriguez	Days of Our Lives	Miguel Garcia	NBC	
2019 (46th)	Wayne Brady	The Bold and the Beautiful	Dr. Reese Buckingham	CBS	
2019 (46th)	Kate Mansi	Days of Our Lives	Abigail Deveraux	NBC	
2019 (46th)	Thaao Penghlis	Days of Our Lives	Andre DiMera	NBC	

=== 2020s ===
Year	Performer	Program	Role	Network	Ref.
2020 (47th)
2020 (47th)	Eva LaRue ‡	The Young and the Restless	Celeste Rosales	CBS	
2020 (47th)	Elissa Kapneck	The Young and the Restless	Sasha	ABC	
2020 (47th)	Michael E. Knight	General Hospital	Martin Grey	ABC	
2020 (47th)	Jeffrey Vincent Parise	The Young and the Restless	Simon Black	CBS	
2020 (47th)	Chrishell Stause	Days of Our Lives	Jordan Ridgeway	NBC	
2021 (48th)
2021 (48th)	Cady McClain ‡	Days of Our Lives	Jennifer Horton-Devereaux	NBC	
2021 (48th)	Kim Delaney	General Hospital	Jackie Templeton	ABC	
2021 (48th)	George DelHoyo	Days of Our Lives	Orpheus	NBC	
2021 (48th)	Briana Lane	General Hospital	Brook Lynn Ashton	ABC	
2021 (48th)	Victoria Platt	Days of Our Lives	Dr. Amanda Raynor	NBC	
2022 (49th)
2022 (49th)	Ted King ‡	The Bold and the Beautiful	Jack Finnegan	CBS	
2022 (49th)	Robert Gossett	General Hospital	Marshall Ashford	ABC	
2022 (49th)	Michael Lowry	Days of Our Lives	Dr. Clay Snyder	NBC	
2022 (49th)	Naomi Matsuda	The Bold and the Beautiful	Dr. Li Finnegan	CBS	
2022 (49th)	Ptosha Storey	The Young and the Restless	Naya Benedict	CBS	
2023 (50th)
2023 (50th)	Alley Mills ‡	General Hospital	Heather Webber	ABC	
2023 (50th)	Steve Burton	Beyond Salem: Chapter Two	Harris Michaels	Peacock	
2023 (50th)	Cassandra Creech	The Bold and the Beautiful	Grace Buckingham	CBS	
2023 (50th)	Robert Newman	The Young and the Restless	Ashland Locke	CBS	
2023 (50th)	Kevin Spirtas	Days of Our Lives	Dr. Craig Wesley	NBC/Peacock	
2024 (51st)
2024 (51st)	Dick Van Dyke ‡	Days of Our Lives	Mystery Man/Timothy Robicheaux	Peacock	
2024 (51st)	Linden Ashby	The Young and the Restless	Cameron Kirsten	CBS	
2024 (51st)	Ashley Jones	The Bold and the Beautiful	Dr. Bridget Forrester	CBS	
2024 (51st)	Alley Mills	General Hospital	Heather Webber	ABC	
2024 (51st)	Guy Pearce	Neighbours	Mike Young	Freevee	
2025 (52nd)
2025 (52nd)	Alley Mills ‡	General Hospital	Heather Webber	ABC	
2025 (52nd)	Linden Ashby	The Young and the Restless	Cameron Kirsten	CBS	
2025 (52nd)	Clint Howard	The Bold and the Beautiful	Tom Starr	CBS	
2025 (52nd)	Jacqueline Grace Lopez	General Hospital	Blaze	ABC	
2025 (52nd)	Valarie Pettiford	The Young and the Restless	Amy Lewis	CBS	
2025 (52nd)	Avery Kristen Pohl	General Hospital	Esme Prince	ABC	
2026 (53rd)
2026 (53rd)	Jeff Kober ‡	General Hospital	Cyrus Renault	ABC	
2026 (53rd)	Jasmine Burke	Beyond the Gates	June Hughes	CBS	
2026 (53rd)	Eva LaRue	General Hospital	Natalia Rogers-Ramirez	ABC	
2026 (53rd)	Christopher Sean	Days of Our Lives	Paul Narita	Peacock	
2026 (53rd)	Ray Wise	The Young and the Restless	Ian Ward	CBS	

== Performers with multiple wins ==
2 wins

- Alley Mills

== Performers with multiple nominations ==
3 nominations

- Alley Mills

2 nominations

- Linden Ashby
- Eva LaRue
- Ray Wise

== Series with most awards ==
6 wins

- General Hospital

4 wins

- The Bold and the Beautiful

3 wins

- Days of Our Lives

2 wins

- The Young and the Restless
