= Bedsider =

Birth control education provider

Bedsider.org (Bedsider) is a free birth control support network for women ages 18–29. The network is operated by The National Campaign to Prevent Teen and Unplanned Pregnancy; a research based non-profit, non-partisan organization located in Washington, D.C. Launched in November 2011, its goal is to help women find the method of birth control that’s right for them and learn how to use it consistently and effectively. The campaign is developed in partnership with IDEO, a global innovation and design firm and Carbon Five, a development firm in San Francisco.

Bedsider provides users with tools to explore and compare all available methods of contraception, to set up birth control or appointment reminders, and to view videos of young men and women’s personal experiences with various methods of contraception. Bedsider also offers a weekly column on sex, love, and life as well as a series of animated shorts that debunk myths about birth control. In addition, Bedsider provides the latest news on contraception and allows website visitors to type in their zip code to find the closest locations that provide contraception over the counter. Bedsider is also mobile and can be used on an iPhone or an Android device.

== History ==
On November 10, 2011, the Ad Council launched a major marketing campaign in support of the Bedsider program. The ads and PSAs created by the ad council address pressing social issues through multiple media outlets. These ads can be found on Bedsider.org, but will also be used on television and in newspapers and other publications in order to further promote Bedsider as a tool for young women around the country.

== Honors and press coverage ==
Bedsider has received awards for its design and layout, and acceptance by media outlets such as the Associated Press and CNN. Additionally, Bedsider has also garnered the support of many medical and public health groups. All medical content found on Bedsider was developed with the assistance of many experts who are a part of The National Campaign to Prevent Teen and Unplanned Pregnancy’s Medical Advisory Committee.
