= Lisa Yamada =

American actress

Lisa Yamada (born September 5, 2002) is an American actress, known for her role as Luna Nozawa on The Bold and the Beautiful.

Yamada is of Japanese American descent, spending her summers visiting grandparents in Japan.

Yamada's first acting credit was for an episode of a National Geographic documentary about the yakuza. In April 2022, she joined the cast for the second season of Freeform's mystery thriller series Cruel Summer. She had a role in the 2023 film Missing, and joined the cast of The Bold and the Beautiful that September. In May 2025, she joined the cast of the Legally Blonde prequel series Elle in a recurring role.

== Filmography ==
=== Film ===
| Year | Title | Role | Notes |
|---|---|---|---|
| 2012 | Smashed | Angela | |
| 2023 | Missing | Alison | |
| 2024 | I Wish You All the Best | Sophie | |

=== Television ===
| Year | Title | Role | Notes |
|---|---|---|---|
| 2013 | Ghost Ghirls | Mean Girl #2 | 1 episode |
| 2013 | The Haunted Hathaways | Cassie | 1 episode |
| 2014 | Extant | Japanese Girl #1 | 2 episodes |
| 2014 | You're the Worst | Girl | 1 episode |
| 2015 | Game Shakers | Chella | 2 episodes |
| 2016 | Uncle Buck | Jo | 1 episode |
| 2016 | The Kicks | Kara | 2 episodes |
| 2017 | Speechless | Kid | 1 episode |
| 2020 | Party of Five | Megan | 1 episode |
| 2020 | Little Fires Everywhere | Serena Wong | Miniseries, 2 episodes |
| 2020 | Man with a Plan | Sabrina | 1 episode |
| 2021 | All American | Sara | 1 episode |
| 2022 | Promised Land | Teen Girl | 1 episode |
| 2022 | Never Have I Ever | Meghan | 1 episode |
| 2023 | Cruel Summer | Parker Tanaka | Main role, 7 episodes |
| 2023–2025 | The Bold and the Beautiful | Luna Nozawa | Main role, 296 episodes |
| 2025 | The Rookie | Louisa | 1 episode |
| 2026 | Elle | Amber | 3 episodes |

== Awards and nominations ==
| Year | Award | Category | Nominated work | Result | Ref. |
|---|---|---|---|---|---|
| 2025 | Daytime Emmy Awards | Outstanding Emerging Talent in a Daytime Drama Series | The Bold and the Beautiful | Won | |
