= List of awards and nominations received by The Bold and the Beautiful =

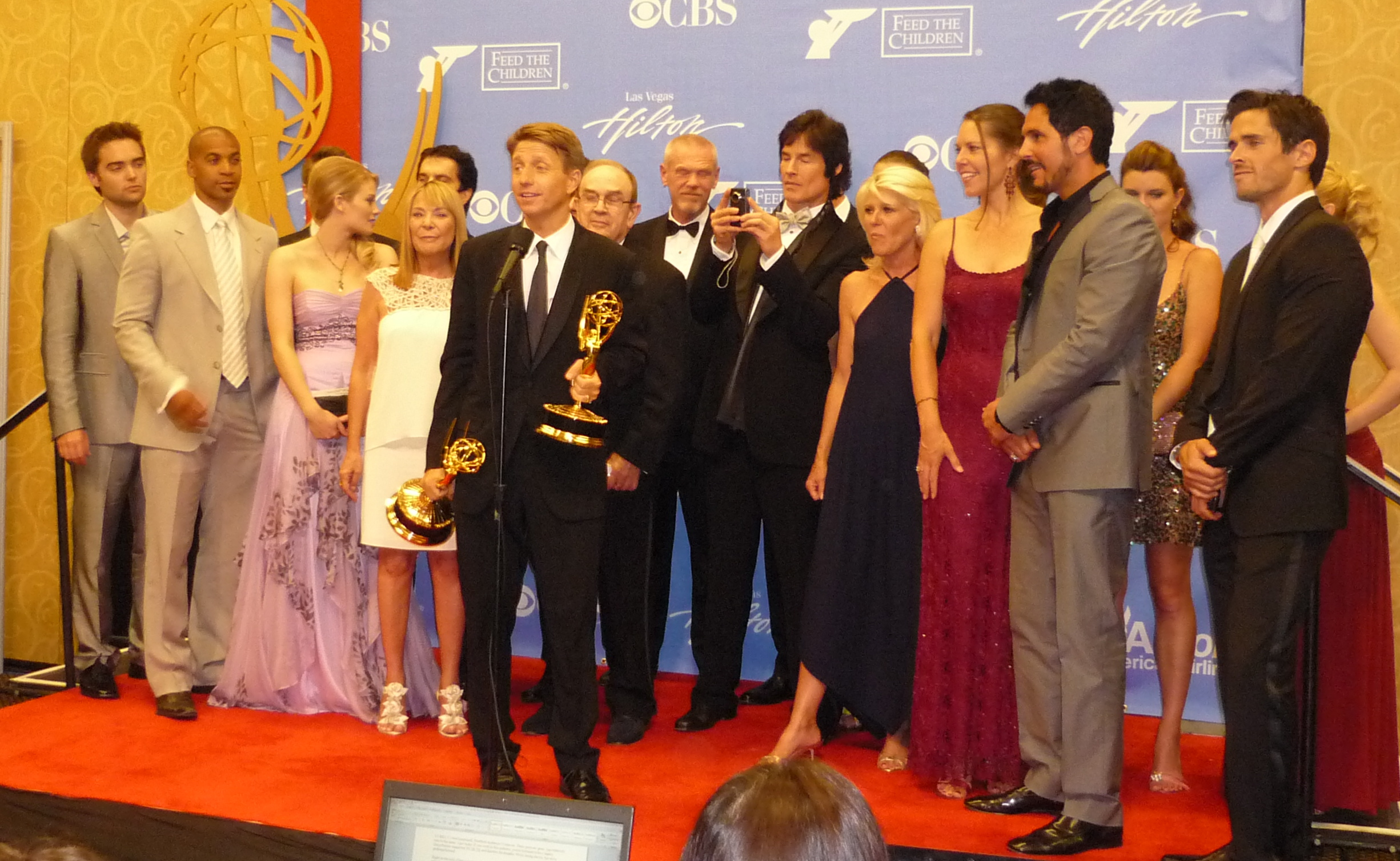
The cast and crew of The Bold and the Beautiful at the 2010 Daytime Emmy Awards

The Bold and the Beautiful is an American television soap opera that has aired on CBS since March 23, 1987. The following is a list of awards and nominations the show's crew and cast have received.

== Daytime Emmy Awards ==
=== Outstanding Drama Series ===
Year	Recipient(s)	Result	Ref
2003	Cast and Crew	Nominated	
2004	Cast and Crew	Nominated	
2007	Cast and Crew	Nominated	
2009	Cast and Crew	Won	
2010	Cast and Crew	Won	
2011	Cast and Crew	Won	
2013	Cast and Crew	Nominated	
2014	Cast and Crew	Nominated	
2015	Cast and Crew	Nominated	
2016	Cast and Crew	Nominated	
2017	Cast and Crew	Nominated	
2018	Cast and Crew	Nominated	
2019	Cast and Crew	Nominated	
2020	Cast and Crew	Nominated	

=== Outstanding Drama Series Directing Team ===
Year	Recipient(s)	Result	Ref
2000	Crew	Nominated	
2002	Crew	Nominated	
2006	Crew	Nominated	
2008	Crew	Nominated	
2010	Crew	Nominated	
2011	Crew	Won	
2012	Crew	Nominated	
2013	Crew	Won	
2014	Crew	Nominated	
2015	Crew	Won	
2016	Crew	Nominated	
2017	Crew	Nominated	
2018	Crew	Nominated	
2019	Crew	Nominated	
2020	Crew	Nominated	

=== Outstanding Drama Series Writing Team ===
Year	Recipient(s)	Result	Ref
2000	Crew	Nominated	
2003	Crew	Nominated	
2006	Crew	Nominated	
2007	Crew	Nominated	
2008	Crew	Nominated	
2009	Crew	Nominated	
2010	Crew	Won	
2011	Crew	Nominated	
2013	Crew	Won	
2014	Crew	Nominated	
2015	Crew	Won	
2016	Crew	Nominated	
2017	Crew	Nominated	
2018	Crew	Nominated	
2019	Crew	Nominated	
2020	Crew	Won	

=== Outstanding Emerging Talent in a Daytime Drama Series ===
Year	Recipient(s)	Role	Result	Ref
2025	Lisa Yamada	Luna Nozawa	Won	

=== Outstanding Lead Actor in a Drama Series ===
Year	Recipient(s)	Role	Result	Ref
2001	John McCook	Eric Forrester	Nominated	
2005	Jack Wagner	Nick Marone	Nominated	
2012	John McCook	Eric Forrester	Nominated	
2017	Scott Clifton	Liam Spencer	Won	
2018	John McCook	Eric Forrester	Nominated	
2020	Thorsten Kaye	Ridge Forrester	Nominated	
2022	John McCook	Eric Forrester	Won	
2024	Thorsten Kaye	Ridge Forrester	Won	

=== Outstanding Lead Actress in a Drama Series ===
Year	Recipient(s)	Role	Result	Ref
2000	Susan Flannery	Stephanie Forrester	Won	
2001	Susan Flannery	Stephanie Forrester	Nominated	
2002	Susan Flannery	Stephanie Forrester	Won	
2003	Susan Flannery	Stephanie Forrester	Won	
2005	Susan Flannery	Stephanie Forrester	Nominated	
2006	Susan Flannery	Stephanie Forrester	Nominated	
2009	Susan Flannery	Stephanie Forrester	Nominated	
2011	Susan Flannery	Stephanie Forrester	Nominated	
2012	Heather Tom	Katie Logan Spencer	Won	
2013	Susan Flannery	Stephanie Forrester	Nominated	
2013	Heather Tom	Katie Logan Spencer	Won	
2014	Katherine Kelly Lang	Brooke Logan	Nominated	
2014	Heather Tom	Katie Logan Spencer	Nominated	
2017	Heather Tom	Katie Logan	Nominated	
2019	Heather Tom	Katie Logan	Nominated	
2019	Jacqueline MacInnes Wood	Steffy Forrester	Won	
2020	Heather Tom	Katie Logan	Won	
2020	Katherine Kelly Lang	Brooke Logan	Nominated	

=== Outstanding Supporting Actor in a Drama Series ===
Year	Recipient(s)	Role	Result	Ref
1994	Ian Buchanan	James Warwick	Nominated	
1995	Ian Buchanan	James Warwick	Nominated	
1996	Ian Buchanan	James Warwick	Nominated	
1997	Ian Buchanan	James Warwick	Won	
1998	Ian Buchanan	James Warwick	Nominated	
2013	Scott Clifton	Liam Spencer	Won (tied with Billy Miller)	
2014	Scott Clifton	Liam Spencer	Nominated	
2015	Scott Clifton	Liam Spencer	Nominated	
2015	Jacob Young	Rick Forrester	Nominated	
2016	Jacob Young	Rick Forrester	Nominated	

=== Outstanding Supporting Actress in a Drama Series ===
Year	Recipient(s)	Role	Result	Ref
1991	Darlene Conley	Sally Spectra	Nominated	
1992	Darlene Conley	Sally Spectra	Nominated	
2007	Lesli Kay	Felicia Forrester	Nominated	
2008	Heather Tom	Katie Logan	Nominated	
2011	Heather Tom	Katie Logan	Won	
2013	Katherine Kelly Lang	Brooke Logan	Nominated	
2015	Linsey Godfrey	Caroline Spencer	Nominated	
2016	Linsey Godfrey	Caroline Spencer	Nominated	
2017	Anna Maria Horsford	Vivienne Avant	Nominated	
2018	Jacqueline MacInnes Wood	Steffy Forrester	Nominated	
2020	Annika Noelle	Hope Logan	Nominated	

=== Outstanding Younger Actor in a Drama Series ===
Year	Recipient(s)	Role	Result	Ref
1999	Jacob Young	Rick Forrester	Nominated	
2001	Justin Torkildsen	Rick Forrester	Won	
2002	Justin Torkildsen	Rick Forrester	Nominated	
2010	Drew Tyler Bell	Thomas Forrester	Won	
2011	Scott Clifton	Liam Spencer	Won	
2016	Pierson Fodé	Thomas Forrester	Nominated	
2017	Pierson Fodé	Thomas Forrester	Nominated	
2017	Anthony Turpel	RJ Forrester	Nominated	
2018	Rome Flynn	Zende Domininguez	Won	

=== Outstanding Younger Actress in a Drama Series ===
Year	Recipient(s)	Role	Result	Ref
2000	Adrienne Frantz	Amber Moore	Nominated	
2001	Adrienne Frantz	Amber Moore	Won	
2002	Jennifer Finnigan	Bridget Forrester	Won	
2003	Jennifer Finnigan	Bridget Forrester	Won	
2003	Adrienne Frantz	Amber Moore	Nominated	
2004	Jennifer Finnigan	Bridget Forrester	Won	
2012	Jacqueline MacInnes Wood	Steffy Forrester	Nominated	
2013	Jacqueline MacInnes Wood	Steffy Forrester	Nominated	
2014	Linsey Godfrey	Caroline Spencer	Nominated	
2014	Kim Matula	Hope Logan	Nominated	
2016	Reign Edwards	Nicole Avant	Nominated	
2016	Ashlyn Pearce	Alexandria Forrester	Nominated	
2017	Reign Edwards	Nicole Avant	Nominated	
2018	Reign Edwards	Nicole Avant	Nominated	

=== Other Awards ===
Year	Category	Result	Recipients	Ref
1988	Outstanding Achievement in Graphics and Title Design	Won	Crew	
1988	Outstanding Achievement in Technical Direction/Electronic Camerawork/Video Control for a Drama Series	Won	Crew	
1988	Outstanding Achievement in Costume Design for a Drama Series	Nominated	Crew	
1988	Outstanding Achievement in Lighting Direction for a Drama Series	Nominated	Crew	
1988	Outstanding Achievement in Art Direction/Set Direction/Scenic Design for a Drama Series	Won	Crew	
1989	Outstanding Achievement in Costume Design for a Drama Series	Nominated	Crew	
1989	Outstanding Achievement in Technical Direction/Electronic Camerawork/Video Control for a Drama Series	Won	Crew	
1991	Outstanding Achievement in Costume Design for a Drama Series	Won	Crew	
1991	Outstanding Achievement in Costume Design for a Drama Series	Won	Crew	
1991	Outstanding Achievement in Lighting Direction for a Drama Series	Won	Crew	
1992	Outstanding Achievement in Costume Design for a Drama Series	Won	Crew	
1992	Outstanding Achievement in Lighting Direction for a Drama Series	Won	Crew	
1993	Outstanding Achievement in Costume Design for a Drama Series	Won	Crew	
1993	Outstanding Achievement in Makeup for a Drama Series	Won	Crew	
1994	Outstanding Achievement in Lighting Direction for a Drama Series	Won	Crew	
1994	Outstanding Achievement in Live and Tape Sound Mixing and Sound Effects for a Drama Series	Won	Crew	
1996	Outstanding Achievement in Technical Direction/Electric Camera/Video Control for a Drama Series	Won	Crew	
1996	Outstanding Hairstyling for a Drama Series	Won	Crew	
1996	Outstanding Achievement in Costume Design for a Drama Series	Nominated	Crew	
1996	Outstanding Makeup for a Drama Series	Nominated	Crew	
1997	Outstanding Achievement in Multiple Camera Editing for a Drama Series	Won	Crew	
1997	Outstanding Achievement in Art Direction/Set Decoration/Scenic Design for a Drama Series	Nominated	Crew	
1997	Outstanding Achievement in Costume Design for a Drama Series	Nominated	Crew	
1997	Outstanding Lighting Direction for a Drama Series	Nominated	Crew	
1997	Outstanding Makeup for a Drama Series	Nominated	Crew	
1998	Outstanding Achievement in Hairstyling for a Drama Series	Won	Crew	
1998	Outstanding Achievement in Art Direction/Set Decoration/Scenic Design for a Drama Series	Nominated	Crew	
1998	Outstanding Achievement in Costume Design for a Drama Series	Nominated	Crew	
1998	Outstanding Achievement in Lighting Direction for a Drama Series	Nominated	Crew	
1998	Outstanding Achievement in Makeup for a Drama Series	Nominated	Crew	
1999	Outstanding Art Direction/Set Decoration/Scenic Design for a Drama Series	Nominated	Crew	
1999	Outstanding Hairstyling for a Drama Series	Nominated	Crew	
1999	Outstanding Live and Direct to Tape Sound Mixing for a Drama Series	Nominated	Crew	
1999	Outstanding Makeup for a Drama Series	Nominated	Crew	
1999	Outstanding Multiple Camera Editing for a Drama Series	Nominated	Crew	
2000	Outstanding Achievement in Art Direction/Set Decoration/Scenic Design for a Drama Series	Nominated	Crew	
2000	Outstanding Achievement in Costume Design for a Drama Series	Nominated	Crew	
2000	Outstanding Achievement in Makeup for a Drama Series	Nominated	Crew	
2000	Outstanding Achievement in Multiple Camera Editing for a Drama Series	Nominated	Crew	
2000	Outstanding Achievement in Technical Direction/Electronic Camera/Video Control for a Drama Series	Nominated	Crew	
2001	Outstanding Achievement in Art Direction/Set Decoration/Scenic Design for a Drama Series	Nominated	Crew	
2001	Outstanding Achievement in Technical Direction/Electronic Camera/Video Control for a Drama Series	Nominated	Crew	
2002	Outstanding Achievement in Live and Direct to Tape Sound Mixing for a Drama Series	Won	Crew	
2002	Outstanding Achievement in Costume Design for a Drama Series	Nominated	Crew	
2002	Outstanding Achievement in Lighting Direction for a Drama Series	Nominated	Crew	
2002	Outstanding Achievement in Multiple Camera Editing for a Drama Series	Nominated	Crew	
2002	Outstanding Achievement in Technical Direction/Electronic Camera/Video Control for a Drama Series	Nominated	Crew	
2002	Special Fan Award America's Favorite Couple	Nominated	Katherine Kelly Lang, Sean Kanan	
2003	Outstanding Achievement in Technical Direction/Electronic Camera/Video Control for a Drama Series	Won	Crew	
2003	Outstanding Achievement in Art Direction/Set Decoration/Scenic Design for a Drama Series	Nominated	Crew	
2003	Outstanding Achievement in Makeup for a Drama Series	Nominated	Crew	
2004	Outstanding Achievement in Costume Design for a Drama Series	Won	Crew	
2004	Outstanding Achievement in Live and Direct to Tape Sound Mixing for a Drama Series	Nominated	Crew	
2004	Outstanding Achievement in Technical Direction/Electronic Camera/Video Control for a Drama Series	Nominated	Crew	
2005	Outstanding Achievement in Costume Design for a Drama Series	Won	Crew	
2005	Outstanding Achievement in Main Title Design	Won	Crew	
2005	Special Fan Award Irresistible Combination	Nominated	Jack Wagner, Ashley Jones	
2006	Outstanding Achievement in Costume Design for a Drama Series	Won	Crew	
2006	Outstanding Achievement in Lighting Direction for a Drama Series	Won	Crew	
2006	Outstanding Achievement in Art Direction/Set Decoration/Scenic Design for a Drama Series	Nominated	Crew	
2006	Outstanding Achievement in Hairstyling for a Drama Series	Nominated	Crew	
2006	Outstanding Achievement in Live and Direct to Tape Sound Mixing for a Drama Series	Nominated	Crew	
2006	Outstanding Achievement in Makeup for a Drama Series	Nominated	Crew	
2007	Outstanding Achievement for a Casting Director for a Drama Series	Nominated	Crew	
2007	Outstanding Achievement in Art Direction/Set Decoration/Scenic Design for a Drama Series	Nominated	Crew	
2007	Outstanding Achievement in Makeup for a Drama Series	Nominated	Crew	
2007	Outstanding Achievement in Multiple Camera Editing for a Drama Series	Nominated	Crew	
2008	Outstanding Achievement in Multiple Camera Editing for a Drama Series	Won	Crew	
2008	Outstanding Achievement in Art Direction/Set Decoration/Scenic Design for a Drama Series	Nominated	Crew	
2008	Outstanding Achievement in Lighting Direction for a Drama Series	Nominated	Crew	
2008	Outstanding Achievement in Music Direction and Composition for a Drama Series	Nominated	Crew	
2009	Outstanding Achievement in Hairstyling for a Drama Series	Won	Crew	
2009	Outstanding Achievement in Art Direction/Set Decoration/Scenic Design for a Drama Series	Nominated	Crew	
2009	Outstanding Achievement in Makeup for a Drama Series	Nominated	Crew	
2010	Outstanding Achievement in Hairstyling for a Drama Series	Won	Crew	
2010	Outstanding Achievement in Music Direction and Composition for a Drama Series	Won	Crew	
2010	Outstanding Achievement for a Casting Director for a Drama Series	Nominated	Crew	
2010	Outstanding Achievement in Art Direction/Set Decoration/Scenic Design for a Drama Series	Nominated	Crew	
2010	Outstanding Achievement in Makeup for a Drama Series	Nominated	Crew	
2010	Outstanding Original Song for a Drama Series	Nominated	Crew	
2010	Outstanding Stunt Coordination	Nominated	Crew	
2011	Outstanding Achievement in Makeup for a Drama Series	Won	Crew	
2011	Outstanding Achievement in Music Direction and Composition for a Drama Series	Won	Crew	
2011	Outstanding Achievement in Art Direction/Set Decoration/Scenic Design for a Drama Series	Nominated	Crew	
2011	Outstanding Achievement in Costume Design for a Drama Series	Nominated	Crew	
2011	Outstanding Achievement in Hairstyling for a Drama Series	Nominated	Crew	
2011	Outstanding Achievement in Multiple Camera Editing for a Drama Series	Nominated	Crew	
2011	Outstanding Achievement in Technical Direction/Electronic Camera/Video Control for a Drama Series	Nominated	Crew	
2012	New Approaches – Daytime Entertainment: “The Clarence Update”	Nominated	Crew	
2012	Outstanding Achievement in Art Direction/Set Decoration/Scenic Design for a Drama Series	Won	Crew	
2012	Outstanding Achievement in Hairstyling for a Drama Series	Won	Crew	
2012	Outstanding Achievement in Music Direction and Composition for a Drama Series	Nominated	Crew	
2012	Outstanding Achievement in Multiple Camera Editing for a Drama Series	Nominated	Crew	
2012	Outstanding Achievement in Sound Mixing for a Drama Series	Nominated	Crew	
2012	Outstanding Achievement in Lighting Direction for a Drama Series	Nominated	Crew	
2013	Hairstyling for a Drama Series	Won	Crew	
2013	Outstanding Achievement in Music Direction and Composition for a Drama Series	Won	Crew	
2013	Outstanding Achievement in Multiple Camera Editing for a Drama Series	Nominated	Crew	
2013	Outstanding Achievement in Lighting Direction for a Drama Series	Won	Crew	
2013	Outstanding Achievement in Technical Direction/Electronic Camera/Video Control for a Drama Series	Won	Crew	
2013	Outstanding Achievement in Costume Design for a Drama Series	Won	Crew	
2013	Outstanding Stunt Coordination for a Drama Series	Nominated	Crew	
2013	Outstanding Achievement for an Original Song for a Drama Series	Nominated	Crew	

== ALMA Awards ==
Year	Category	Recipient(s)	Role	Result	Ref
1998	Outstanding Actress in a Daytime Drama	Lilly Melgar	Claudia Cortéz	Won	
2001	Outstanding Actress in a Daytime Drama	Gladys Jimenez	Carmen Arena	Won	
2002	Outstanding Actress in a Daytime Drama	Sandra Vidal	Sofia Alonso	Won	

== British Soap Awards ==
Year	Category	Result	Recipients	Ref
1999	Best Foreign Soap	Won	Cast and crew	

== Directors Guild of America ==
Year	Category	Result	Recipients	Ref
1992	Outstanding Directorial Achievement in Serials - Daytime	Won	Crew	
1994	Outstanding Directorial Achievement in Serials - Daytime	Nominated	John C. Zak	
1995	Outstanding Directorial Achievement in Serials - Daytime	Won	Crew	
1996	Outstanding Directorial Achievement in Serials - Daytime	Nominated	Susan Flannery	
1997	Outstanding Directorial Achievement in Serials - Daytime	Nominated	Michael Stich	
1998	Outstanding Directorial Achievement in Daytime Serials	Nominated	Susan Flannery	
1999	Outstanding Directorial Achievement in Daytime Serials	Nominated	Nancy Eckels	
2002	Outstanding Directorial Achievement in Daytime Serials	Nominated	Michael Stich	
2003	Outstanding Directorial Achievement in Daytime Serials	Nominated	Michael Stich	
2006	Outstanding Directorial Achievement in Daytime Serials	Nominated	Michael Stich	
2010	Outstanding Directorial Achievement in Daytime Serials	Nominated	Cynthia J. Popp	

== NAACP Image Awards ==
Year	Category	Result	Recipients	Ref
1999	Outstanding Actor in a Daytime Drama Series	Usher Raymond	Nominated	
2006	Outstanding Actor in a Daytime Drama Series	Antonio Sabato, Jr.	Nominated	
2007	Outstanding Actor in a Daytime Drama Series	Antonio Sabato, Jr.	Nominated	
2008	Outstanding Actor in a Daytime Drama Series	Mykel Shannon Jenkins	Nominated	
2009	Outstanding Actor in a Daytime Drama Series	Texas Battle	Nominated	
2009	Outstanding Actor in a Daytime Drama Series	Dan Martin	Nominated	
2010	Outstanding Actor in a Daytime Drama Series	Texas Battle	Nominated	
2011	Outstanding Actor in a Daytime Drama Series	Rodney Saulsberry	Nominated	
2011	Outstanding Actor in a Daytime Drama Series	Aaron D. Spears	Nominated	
2011	Outstanding Actress in a Daytime Drama Series	Yvette Freeman	Nominated	
2012	Outstanding Actor in a Daytime Drama Series	Texas Battle	Nominated	
2012	Outstanding Actor in a Daytime Drama Series	Aaron D. Spears	Nominated	
2013	Outstanding Actor in a Daytime Drama Series	Rodney Saulsberry	Nominated	
2013	Outstanding Actor in a Daytime Drama Series	Aaron D. Spears	Nominated	

== Imagen Foundation Awards ==
Year	Category	Result	Recipients	Ref
2007	Best Supporting Actor - Television	Won	Lorenzo Lamas	
2006	Best Supporting Actor	Won	Mario López	

== Prism Awards ==
Year	Category	Result	Recipients	Ref
2007	TV Daytime Drama Series Multi-Episode Storyline	Won	Cast and crew	

== Rose d'Or ==
Year	Category	Result	Recipients	Ref
2006	Best Soap Actor	Won	Jack Wagner	
2005	Best Soap Female	Won	Lesley-Anne Down	
2005	Best Soap Male	Won	Lorenzo Lamas	

== Young Artist Awards ==
The Young Artist Awards are presented annually by the Young Artist Association. Originally known as the Youth In Film Awards for the first twenty years. The soap opera has earned 13 nominations and 4 wins.

Year	Category	Recipient(s)	Role	Result	Ref
1995	Best Performance by a Youth Actress in a Daytime Series	Maitland Ward	Jessica Forrester	Won	
1996	Best Performance by a Young Actor: TV Drama Series	Steven Hartman	Rick Forrester	Nominated	
1996	Best Performance by a Young Actor: TV Drama Series	Kyle Sabihy	C.J. Garrison	Nominated	
1996	Best Performance by a Young Actress: TV Drama Series	Maitland Ward	Jessica Forrester	Nominated	
1997	Best Performance in a Daytime Drama: Young Actor	Steven Hartman	Rick Forrester	Nominated	
1997	Best Performance in a Daytime Drama: Young Actor	Kyle Sabihy	C.J. Garrison	Won	
1997	Best Performance in a Daytime Drama: Young Actress	Landry Albright	Bridget Forrester	Won	
1999	Best Performance Best Performance in a Daytime Serial: Young Performer	Adrienne Frantz	Amber Moore	Won	
2000	Best Performance in a Soap Opera: Young Actress	Adrienne Frantz	Amber Moore	Nominated	
2001	Best Performance in a Daytime TV Series: Young Actor	Justin Torkildsen	Rick Forrester	Nominated	
2001	Best Performance in a Daytime TV Series: Young Actress	Jennifer Finnigan	Bridget Forrester	Nominated	
2001	Best Performance in a Daytime TV Series: Young Actress	Ashley Lyn Cafagna	Kimberly Fairchild	Nominated	
2002	Best Performance in a TV Drama Series: Leading Young Actress	Ashley Lyn Cafagna	Kimberly Fairchild	Nominated	
2003	Best Performance in a TV Series (Comedy or Drama) - Young Actor Age Ten or Younger	Patrick Allen Dorn	Thomas Forrester	Nominated	
2004	Best Performance in a TV Series - Recurring Young Actor	Patrick Allen Dorn	Thomas Forrester	Nominated	
2005	Best Performance in a TV Series (Comedy or Drama) - Recurring Young Actress	Keaton and Kylie Rae Tyndall	Phoebe Forrester/Steffy Forrester	Nominated	
