= Amber Moore =

- The Bold and the Beautiful character
- Portrayed by: Adrienne Frantz
- Duration: 1997–2013
- First appearance: July 18, 1997
- Last appearance: September 4, 2013
- Created by: Bradley Bell
- Introduced by: Bradley Bell (1997, 2010); Lynn Marie Latham (2006); Jill Farren Phelps (2013)
- Spin-off appearances: L.A. Diaries
- Crossover appearances: The Young and the Restless
In-universe information
- Other names: Ambrosia Moore; Marina Dryden; Amber Forrester; Amber Ashby; Amber Romalotti
- Occupation: Businesswoman; Fashion designer
- Mother: Tawny Moore
- Sisters: April Knight
- Husband: Rick Forrester (1999–2000, 2001–03); Cane Ashby (2007); Daniel Romalotti (2009–10)
- Sons: Eric Forrester III
- Daughters: Rosie Forrester
- Adoptive sons: Eric Sharpe
- Grandmothers: Gertrude Moore
- Uncles: Joe Moore
- Aunts: Tilly Moore
- First cousins: Becky Moore Garrison

Amber Moore is a fictional character from the American soap operas The Bold and the Beautiful and The Young and the Restless. For the character's entirety, she has been portrayed by Adrienne Frantz, introduced by Bradley Bell to The Bold and the Beautiful on July 18, 1997. She was a babysitter for Brooke Logan (Katherine Kelly Lang) and Eric Forrester's (John McCook) children, but ended up having a romance with their son, Rick Forrester (Jacob Young). As a young woman, she endured several challenges including being drugged and raped, having a relationship with a younger man and becoming an enemy of Sheila Carter (Kimberlin Brown), a psychotic criminal.

Frantz was later brought over to The Young and the Restless by former head writer Lynn Marie Latham, where she aired from November 28, 2006, to May 27, 2010. There, she became involved in storylines involving Katherine Chancellor (Jeanne Cooper), the show's matriarch. She also had romances with Cane Ashby (Daniel Goddard) and Daniel Romalotti (Michael Graziadei). After her exit, she returned to The Bold and the Beautiful. Upon her return, she became pregnant and gave birth to a daughter, Rosie Forrester, with Marcus Forrester (Texas Battle). In June 2012, she was bumped to recurring by Bell with no appearances afterwards. The following year, Frantz made a brief guest appearance on The Young and the Restless for Katherine's memorial service, last airing on September 4, 2013.

== Casting and creation ==
The character was introduced and created by head writer of The Bold and the Beautiful, Bradley Bell. Amber began on the soap opera to interact with the Forresters, and was quickly portrayed as the "Gold digger", and was a fan favorite despite "evil ways". She left the series after her contract expired in June 2005. That October, it was announced that Frantz would reprise the role on The Young and the Restless, introduced by former executive producer and head writer Lynn Marie Latham. When the character joined the show's sister soap, her intentions laid the same, to try to attract a handsome bartender Cane Ashby who was destined for a fortune (thought to be Phillip Chancellor III). In 2010, it was announced Frantz would be leaving The Young and the Restless and returning to The Bold and the Beautiful. For her portrayal, Frantz has won a Daytime Emmy Award for Outstanding Younger Actress in 2001, receiving nominations in the same category for 2000 and 2003. She has also won Best Performance by a Young Performer in a Daytime Serial at the 20th Annual Youth in Film Awards.

In March 2007, speaking about if she would ever return to The Bold and the Beautiful, Frantz stated: "You never know. I talked to Brad [Bell] about this and odds are I'll probably show up there in the future. B&B is like my family. It's fun to see them in the hall again and grab them, give them big hugs and hang out in their hair and makeup room." She eventually returned in 2010. In June 2012, Frantz was taken off contract and bumped to recurring. It was reported that Frantz would use that free time in order to pursue other projects. However, she never made another appearance on the show. In September 2013, however, Frantz made a brief appearance on The Young and the Restless for the funeral of Katherine Chancellor (Jeanne Cooper), last airing on September 4 of that year.

== Development ==
=== Characterization ===
"No matter where Amber goes, the same hijinks follow. "

— Soap Opera Digest

Originating from Furnace Creek in Death Valley, Amber Moore arrived in Los Angeles, California, at the age of 17 in 1997. Beth Cochran of the website About noted that: "has had her own agenda: find a rich man, get him to marry her, and live happily ever after." Cochran also wrote that: "Amber's resume is padded with short stints as a nanny, a singer, a ghostwriter, and a fashion designer, but she is mainly qualified as an expert gold-digger." According to B&B's official website, "A wayward vixen with a heart of gold, Amber Moore escaped the rusted doublewides of Furnace Creek for the Los Angeles life of glitz and glamour." Amber has worked at Forrester Creations and its rival company, Jackie M, as a designer. She is described as having "evil ways" and it "didn't take long for her win over the critics with her performance of a girl from the wrong side of the tracks trying to make a better life for herself–any way she could!". Her character is also called a "mischievous schemer". She is known for her romance and later marriage to the younger Rick Forrester (Jacob Young, later Justin Torkildsen and Kyle Lowder).

Amber faced several challenges as a young woman. She was kidnapped and nearly killed by criminal Sheila Carter (Kimberlin Brown), who was the person that initially brought her to L.A. While involved with Rick, she slept with highschool friend Raymond, who was portrayed by R&B superstar Usher Raymond. She became pregnant; it was unknown who the child was. She gave birth to a stillborn baby and its paternity was never revealed. Amber became a drug addict after losing a child. Her close friend Taylor Forrester (Hunter Tylo) told her to go to rehab. This eventually led to her rape. Naomi Rabinowitz of Soap Opera Digest explained the storyline: "Taylor persuaded her to go to rehab, but during her welcome home party, Amber was drugged by one of the guests, Lance — and woke up in bed with him. Rick was furious upon learning that his wife allegedly cheated on him, but Amber insisted she was drugged and moved in with Taylor. To make matters worse, Sheila returned and killed Lance before he could vouch for Amber. Sheila then kidnapped Amber and ended up shooting and killing Taylor." She left L.A. in 2005. She returned in 2010; she quickly realised she was pregnant. She tried to pass off her baby as the rich Liam Spencer's (Scott Clifton), but it was revealed that Marcus Forrester (Texas Battle), Rick's cousin and adoptive half-brother, is Rosie's biological father.

=== Crossover ===
When Amber came to Genoa City in 2006, she befriended the town's matriarch Katherine Chancellor (Jeanne Cooper), whom she called "Mrs C.". Cochran wrote that Katherine brought out Amber's "more caring, unselfish side." A few months into Amber's run on Y&R, she began getting into trouble again through her schemes. Frantz stated: "she's causing trouble and twisting everyone's lives up again." Devin Owens of Soap Opera Digest noted that "[Amber] is definitely back to being the scheming temptress we knew on B&B." Of the fan's reactions to Amber's scheming ways, she said: "I get a lot of, 'I can't believe she's doing that!' But that means I'm doing my job. I'm not like that in real life, ladies and gentlemen. I'm really a nice person."

Amber became involved with Cane Ashby (Daniel Goddard) to get his money, after finding out he was Katherine's "grandson" (It was later proved this was a lie). Of working with Goddard, Frantz told Soap Opera Digest: "He's been wonderful and fun. We've got really great chemistry that I think is very natural. We have a different dynamic, and at the same time when Amber is doing all of this horrible stuff, she really is in love with him". After that relationship failed, she was married to Daniel Romalotti (Michael Graziadei). The marriage was short; she left Genoa City and returned to Los Angeles.

== The Bold and the Beautiful ==
=== 1997–2005 ===
Amber arrived in Los Angeles (The Bold and the Beautiful) from Death Valley, where she had met Sheila Carter (Kimberlin Brown) in 1997. Sheila secretly installed Amber into the home of James (Ian Buchanan) and Maggie Warwick (Barbara Crampton) as a nanny for James and Sheila's daughter Mary, allowing Sheila to visit her daughter unbeknownst to the Warwicks. However, Amber soon realized Sheila’s disturbed nature and revealed the truth to James and Maggie. Subsequently, Amber began babysitting teens Rick Forrester (Jacob Young) and his sister Bridget Forrester (Agnes Bruckner), the children of Amber's eventual rival Brooke Logan (Katherine Kelly Lang). Amber, always wanting to be with a rich man for his money, began flirting with the sixteen-year-old Rick Forrester. They eventually had sex when she was supposed to be baby sitting him. She then won the graces of the Forrester family by saving Stephanie Forrester's (Susan Flannery) life when she was shot by Sheila.

After having competed with Kimberly Fairchild (Ashley Lyn Cafagna) for Rick's affections, Amber ended up becoming pregnant. For a small amount of time, it was unknown if the child was Rick's or that of a singer named Raymond King (Usher), whom she had dated briefly. Amber married Rick despite this, and she delivered the stillborn Eric Forrester III. She later took in her cousin Becky's (Marissa Tait) unwanted son, raising it as her own; however, Becky reclaims her child later and discovers the truth. Becky later dies of cancer, and Amber begins dating her cousin's husband C.J. Garrison (Mick Cain). Amber has a party at her apartment and she and C.J. are mistakenly arrested for drug possession, resulting in Child Protective Services taking the baby away, letting the child live with Rick. Eric Jr.'s biological father, Deacon Sharpe (Sean Kanan) comes to town, interrupting Amber and C.J.'s wedding ceremony. Amber realizes her best chance for custody is with Rick (Justin Torkildsen), and she ends her relationship with C.J.

Meanwhile, Amber engages in a fling with Deacon, who tries to take his child back when Amber rejects him. Deacon later seduces and marries Bridget (Jennifer Finnigan) and tells Rick's parents, Eric and Brooke, that if he has to divorce Bridget, Amber will have to leave Rick and marry him instead. Amber refuses to leave Rick and Deacon becomes enmeshed in a triangle that develops between Bridget and her mother Brooke.

Sheila secretly returns to L.A. in 2002 with her now-grown up daughter, Erica Lovejoy (Courtnee Draper), who develops a crush on Amber's husband, Rick, but would never act on it. Sheila pays off a man named Lance to drug and rape Amber, but when Lance threatens to tell Amber everything that happened, Sheila kills him. Amber finds out about Erica's crush and is suspicious of her intentions, and the two fight and Erica is injured in an accident. Amber moves in with Dr. Taylor Hayes Forrester (Hunter Tylo) despite the opposition of her husband Ridge (Ronn Moss). Sheila frames Amber for various crimes, and continues to push Erica to have sex with Rick so she can be connected to the Forresters once again herself. Erica's true identity (as Sheila's daughter Mary) is exposed, but not before Sheila kidnaps Amber. Sheila later holds Eric Forrester (John McCook) and Taylor hostage, and shoots Taylor and Brooke. Taylor is presumed dead as a result of her wounds, while Sheila is jailed (however later returns to The Young and the Restless). In 2003 Amber meets her twin sister April Knight (also played by Adrienne Frantz)

Amber reunites with Rick, but they soon lose custody of Little Eric to Deacon and his new wife Macy Alexander (Bobbie Eakes). Amber kidnaps the child and goes on the run, which results in Rick divorcing her. Amber later repeats her ways by seducing another young man, Ridge's son Thomas Forrester (Drew Tyler Bell). Ridge's hatred for Amber intensifies during this time. Amber intertwines herself in Ridge and Brooke's lives as a couple, complicating their situation. As part of her plan to get back together with Thomas, Amber locks Ridge and Bridget (Ashley Jones) in a mineshaft, where they kiss. Amber catches this on tape and shows it to Brooke, who kicks Ridge out. However, later it is revealed that it was Amber who caused Ridge and Bridget to nearly die from hypothermia. She is condemned by the Forresters and leaves for Italy, where she encounters an amnesiac Ridge, who had been kidnapped by the unstable Morgan DeWitt (Sarah G. Buxton). Amber exposes Morgan's scheme and helps Ridge get home, but this doesn't improve her standing with the Forresters. Promising to better herself, Amber leaves town and goes to Genoa City.

=== 2010–2012 ===
After leaving Genoa City, Amber returned to Los Angeles began working for Jackie (Lesley-Anne Down) and Nick Marone (Jack Wagner) at Jackie M Designs. Her job is short-lived when it's discovered that the designs were stolen from Forrester Creations. After a one-night stand with Oliver Jones (Zack Conroy), Amber discovers she was pregnant and assumed the child as his. However, she decides to pass the baby off as Liam Spencer's (Scott Clifton) to have access to his father Bill Spencer Jr.'s (Don Diamont) fortune. Amber strings Liam along during the pregnancy allowing him to believe the child is his, much to the chagrin of Bill, who attempts to kill Amber by letting her fall from a cliff. Steffy Forrester (Jacqueline MacInnes Wood) arrives and saves Amber in the nick of time.

After Amber gives birth, the baby appears to be of mixed race, freeing Liam and giving Amber a newfound relationship with her baby's true father, Marcus Forrester (Texas Battle). Bill is prepared to have Amber arrested for manipulating Liam but since Amber's child is the grandchild of his best friend, Justin Barber (Aaron D. Spears), Bill decides that he's going to give Amber a free pass... this time. But Bill strongly warns Amber that if she ever comes near and manipulates anyone in his family, again, he will show no mercy. Amber gets Bill's message loud and clear. After Marcus turns her down several times, Amber tells him and his girlfriend Dayzee (Kristolyn Lloyd) that while she would have liked to have had a chance with Marcus, she realizes the timing was all wrong. Amber then sets her sights on ex-husband Rick Forrester (again played by Jacob Young) and begins to draw up designs for him that were based on his ideas, so he is able to have his own line and take credit for the designs as his own. As her relationship with Rick deepens, she begins feeding street drugs to Hope Logan (Kim Matula), who believes they are from her psychiatrist. Brooke then hires Caroline Spencer (Linsey Godfrey), daughter of Karen Spencer (Joanna Johnson), into Forrester Creations to act as Rick's new design partner. Threatened both on a professional and personal level, Amber begins to work up a scheme that leads Caroline to believe Rick is a crossdresser. When Caroline confronts Hope with the information, Hope attacks Amber, accusing her of manipulating Caroline to get her way. Amber then confesses to giving Hope illegal drugs, which in turn brings the end of her relationship with Rick.

== The Young and the Restless ==
=== 2006–2010 ===
In the fall of 2006, Amber arrived in Genoa City (on The Young and the Restless). Amber became acquainted with many of the residences of Genoa City when helping Neil Winters' (Kristoff St. John) club Indigo by singing there. She reunited with friend Lauren Fenmore (Tracey E. Bregman) who gave her a job at her boutique. Amber met town matriarch Katherine Chancellor (Jeanne Cooper) and they became very dear friends. When Kay began having dreams about her past where she dreamt she switched Jill Foster Abbott (Jess Walton) baby nearly forty years prior, Amber decided to start help searching for the long-lost baby (so it seemed until 2009).

Amber's search ended when she contacted a guy named Cane Ashby (Daniel Goddard) who wound up coming to Genoa City. She began a relationship with Cane when it was discovered he was Jill's long-lost child and the possible heir to a fortune. Amber and her friend Alison Stewart staged a fake marriage (Alison pretended to be Cane) in Las Vegas. The marriage ended when the truth was revealed. Amber briefly dated Adrian Korbel (Eyal Podell).

Amber started a brief rivalry with Lily Winters (Christel Khalil) who won Cane's heart shortly after. Amber tried (but failed) to win Cane back. Amber started flirting with Lily's then-husband Daniel Romalotti (Michael Graziadei). Daniel and Lily's marriage ended when Lily found porn (naked pictures of Amber) on Daniel's phone. Amber and Daniel eventually started a relationship. After this, Amber's previous boyfriend (after she left L.A) named Plum arrived in Genoa City. Later Kevin Fisher (Greg Rikaart) found Plum dead and they all found out that he had thousands of dollars. Amber, Kevin and Daniel made a pact not to talk about the money to anyone and not to use it, but Amber did.

Amber's infatuated stalker Deacon Sharpe arrived in town and shook up Amber and Daniel's relationship by blackmailing Amber and framing Daniel for art theft. Amber in an attempt to keep Daniel from being prosecuted slept with Deacon. Eventually Deacon tried harder to come between the couple, and Daniel's controlling mother, Phyllis Summers (Michelle Stafford), enforced it. Nonetheless, Amber and Daniel married, but Deacon continued to harass the couple, and was arrested and jailed. Amber and Daniel's marriage hit another bumpy road when Amber caught a drugged Daniel in bed with Sheila's daughter Daisy Carter (Yvonne Zima). Amber left town with Little Eric, marking the end of Daniel and Amber's marriage.

=== 2013 ===
In September 2013, Amber returns briefly to Genoa City for Katherine's memorial service.

== Reception ==
In November 2003, whilst discussing the current storylines and characters of The Bold and the Beautiful, Nancy M. Reichardt from the Edmonton Journal criticised the storyline where Rick almost loses their child, opining that Amber "is, for certain, a loose cannon, but would not have jeopardized her child". In 2015, a writer from Soap Opera Digest called Amber "white trash" and believed that the Moore family was one of the most memorable on The Bold and the Beautiful. In 2022, Charlie Mason from Soaps She Knows placed Amber 9th on his ranked list of The Bold and the Beautiful's Best of the Best Characters Ever, commenting that it is "almost impossible to believe that anything ever happens on the West Coast since it lost its foremost scheme queen, the mischievous imp that Adrienne Frantz made so pivotal, she couldn't be contained by one soap opera." Mason's colleague, Candace Young, called Amber a "pot-stirrer", whilst Jamey Giddins from Daytime Confidential called her a "schemer". Richard Simms from Soaps She Knows noted that despite Amber being "involved in everything from pawning jewelry to a baby swap", he believed that she "was not, however, a villainess so much as a young woman who made more than her fair share of mistakes in the pursuit of happiness", which he wrote became "clear" when she was befriended by Katherine on The Young and the Restless.
