= Deacon Sharpe =

Fictional character from the American CBS soap opera The Young and the Restless

- The Bold and the Beautiful character
- Portrayed by: Sean Kanan
- Duration: 2000–2005; 2009–2012; 2014–2017; 2021–present
- First appearance: November 1, 2000
- Created by: Bradley Bell
- Introduced by: Bradley Bell (2000, 2012, 2014, 2021); Maria Arena Bell and Paul Rauch (2009); Anthony Morina and Josh Griffith (2022)
- Crossover appearances: The Young and the Restless
In-universe information
- Other names: Deacon Ray Sharpe; Jim
- Occupation: Restaurateur; Bartender; Businessman
- Father: Daryl Sharpe
- Wife: Bridget Forrester (2001–2002); Macy Alexander (2003); Nikki Newman (2011–2012); Quinn Fuller (2015–2016); Sheila Carter (2024–2026)
- Sons: Eric Sharpe
- Daughters: Hope Logan
- Granddaughters: Beth Spencer

Deacon Sharpe is a fictional character, from the CBS soap opera The Bold and the Beautiful, portrayed by Sean Kanan from November 1, 2000, to February 22, 2005. From June 23, 2009, to January 30, 2012, the character appeared on its sister soap The Young and the Restless.

Kanan returned to the role on The Bold and the Beautiful on May 24, 2012. Shortly after, Kanan was dismissed and last seen on June 27, 2012, though the actor was later rehired. His last appearance was on October 9, 2012. On March 17, 2014, Kanan announced his return to The Bold and the Beautiful in a regular capacity. He once again returned on June 13, 2014.

In October 2021, Kanan reprised the role once again.

In September 2022, a crossover event between The Bold and the Beautiful and The Young and the Restless was announced involving Kanan’s character along with the Y&R character of Nikki Newman, played by Melody Thomas Scott. Kanan’s appearances on The Young and the Restless were September 20 to 21, 2022.

== Storylines ==
=== 2000–2005 ===
Deacon was first known as the biological father of "Little Eric", a baby being raised by Rick Forrester (Justin Torkildsen) and Amber Moore (Adrienne Frantz). The baby's biological mother is Amber's cousin, Becky. Amber passes the child off as her son from Rick. The truth is discovered and Deacon pursues custody of the child.

Deacon then began to pursue a romantic relationship with Amber by attempting to seduce her away from Rick for himself, the efforts are complicated by his relationship with Bridget Forrester (Jennifer Finnigan) Deacon pretends to be over Amber after Bridget discovers he married her to get Amber to leave Rick, she has a near fatal car accident and Eric tries to kill him by running him over with his car and he feels like scum, so in an attempt to make himself feel less guilty he makes an attempt to forget Amber but continues to pursue her by taking her to Vegas to give her a massage and by creating situations in which he shows up at beach locations and rubs lotion on her body in an attempt to tempt her, unfortunately, Bridget and Deacon's marriage was never real, but was based on his obsession with Amber and what kept them together was his attempt to prove to Bridget that he could be a better person and that was even after having an affair with Brooke, thus, Deacon begins a clandestine affair with Bridget's mother, Brooke Logan (Katherine Kelly Lang) while married to Brooke's daughter whose husband had recently left her. He arrived at Brooke's apartment when Brooke was lamenting losing Thorne and Ridge both. Turning to each other for comfort, they had sex, they continue the affair behind Bridget's back. The reason Thorne left Brooke is because he heard them discussing their past lives and overheard Brooke telling Deacon that she thought about Ridge every single day, Brooke gives birth to their daughter, Hope Logan (Annika Noelle) after trying for months to be part of Hope's life, Brooke runs Deacon off trying to chase Ridge again after Taylor dies. Deacon eventually came back to try to be part of Hope's life again when Brooke was with Nick Marone (Jack Wagner) and Nick talked Brooke into allowing Deacon to be a father to Hope. Deacon wanted Nick to adopt Hope because he was so grateful, so he signed the rights over to Nick once Nick and Brooke got married and left town. Years later after Nick and Brooke broke up, Deacon had to sign off on parental rights to Hope over to Ridge Forrester (Ronn Moss) when Brooke lost custody of the kids due to her inability to care for them correctly.

Deacon goes on to connect with other older female characters on the show; a marriage to Macy Alexander (Bobbie Eakes) and an affair with Jacqueline Payne Marone (Lesley-Anne Down). The character leaves town in 2005 after relapsing back into alcoholism due to Jackie's husband Massimo Marone (Joseph Mascolo) having Deacon's drinks laced with alcohol to get revenge on Deacon and Jackie for their affair.

=== 2009–2012 ===
In June 2009, Deacon began appearing in Genoa City as a supposed art dealer. He is involved with a stolen painting incident and frames Daniel Romalotti (Michael Graziadei), the boyfriend of Deacon's old flame Amber Moore. He agrees to provide the evidence that will get Daniel out of prison, if she has sex with him. Amber agrees, but while they have sex, he makes sure Daniel hears them over the phone by posing as Daniel's attorney, Michael Baldwin (Christian LeBlanc) when he is calling him.

Next to his scheme against Daniel, he is doing business with Victoria Newman (Amelia Heinle) Victoria faces marital problems. After seeing pictures of her husband J.T. Hellstrom (Thad Luckinbill) kissing his ex-girlfriend, Colleen Carlton (Tammin Sursok) Victoria has sex with Deacon. He later blackmails Amber into marrying him, by threatening Daniel Romalotti's freedom. He tricks Gloria Bardwell into handing over the stolen Terroni painting by promising her a share of the money he received when he sold it. He is tricked by Victoria Newman and Daniel Romalotti into thinking he has the real Terroni, but he has a fake one.

Ryder's mother is blackmailing him to help her break up Michael and Lauren Baldwin. Deacon was blackmailed by Daniel's mother Phyllis Newman (Michelle Stafford) to leave town with Amber and he'd get the cell phone which incriminates his crimes, so he kidnapped Amber outside of Crimson Lights at Daniel's party, his car runs out of gas near an abandoned farmhouse, and he tells Amber that he still loves her and so does his son Eric, who still thinks of her as his mother. Daniel shows up along with Phyllis and it is revealed that the three of them tricked Deacon, so he would get arrested for kidnapping and Phyllis gave the police the cell phone to exonerate Daniel of Ray Elkins' murder. As Deacon is hauled off by the police, he tells Amber that he won't be the only one to suffer, letting her know that Eric will suffer too.

In July 2010, Deacon is paroled from prison. He encounters Phyllis, now estranged from husband Nick Newman (Joshua Morrow), and stuck in her car with a flat tire during a thunderstorm in a rather isolated area - somewhat near the Abbott cabin. Though she refuses Deacon's offers of help, when Phyllis sees Nick approaching, she kisses Deacon, in an attempt to make Nick jealous. However, as soon as Nick leaves, Phyllis stops and orders Deacon out of her car. A few weeks later, Deacon applies for a job as bartender at Gloria (Judith Chapman) and Jeffrey Bardwell's new club, Gloworm. Gloria hires him, much to the annoyance of many in Genoa City, still angry at his manipulations and his role in framing Daniel for murder. At his new job he gets to see Phyllis again and Deacon immediately starts flirting with her. When he kisses her again, Phyllis first kisses him back, before slapping him across the face as Phyllis' ex-husband and good friend Jack Abbott (Peter Bergman) walks in. Feeling humiliated when she finds out that Nick is letting his ex-wife Sharon Newman (Sharon Case) stay at their house, Phyllis returns into Deacon's arms and they have passionate sex in front of a dumpster behind Gloworm.

As a bartender doesn't show up, Gloria contacts Deacon to fill in on Victoria's wedding to Billy Abbott (Billy Miller). When Victoria sees the man who destroyed her last marriage, she tells Gloria that she wants him gone. Before leaving, Deacon notices the fight Nikki Newman (Melody Thomas Scott) is having to not take a drink. Afterwards he runs into Phyllis, who invites him to be her "plus one" to the wedding; just to piss off Nick. Michael tells Phyllis that she is going to far, but she doesn't listen and let Nick realize who she brought as her date. He then enters in cahoots with Meggie McClaine, who has a crush on Victor Newman; in exchange for getting Nikki drunk and bringing her to Deacon, he'll help her win Victor over.

Deacon and Nikki become romantically involved, and he even comforts her during the difficult time she's currently going through with her former husband Victor Newman. The two become closer after Nikki is confronted by Victor, who yells at her for being involved with Deacon. Eventually Meggie is arrested and Nikki went to rehab. Since Nikki's return from rehab, she has attempted to be away from Deacon, but they quickly give into temptation. Deacon comforts Nikki who is dealing with family issues and returning desires to drink again. On Valentine's Day, Nikki and Deacon make their relationship completely public, upsetting Victor, Victoria, and many others.

Later Meggie returns to town and threatens to tell Nikki the truth about his involvement in her and Victor's breakup if he doesn't help her get out of jail. Originally unwilling, Deacon eventually tries to put together a plan to bust Meggie out, but it fails. Meggie calls Nikki to come to the jail because she has some important news for her. Deacon catches up to Nikki, but Meggie tells Nikki the truth anyway. Nikki is shocked by it and storms out. She calls Nick who tells her that Victor and Diane have gotten married. Only a day earlier Nikki and Victor had sex. All of this news forced Nikki back to the alcohol later that night.

Deacon returns in November 2011 when Nikki comes home from rehab. It is revealed that she had a short-lived relationship with him while she not very was away, and she is shown to seriously regret it. Nikki continues to drink even though she's supposed to be sober. Deacon claims he knows the truth about Diane's murder, and in order for him to not reveal it to the world, he blackmails Nikki into marrying him in Las Vegas.

However, Nikki finds out that Deacon wasn't even at the scene of Diane's murder and that he was lying the entire time. Due to this, Nikki plans to have their marriage annulled but doesn't do it in order to find out who really killed Diane. It is later revealed that Nikki actually killed Diane in self-defense. Deacon then confesses that he then hit Diane's head with a rock seven to eight more times to make it seem as if someone stronger than Nikki killed Diane. Later on, when the police were looking for the final suspect in the murder, Deacon said it was someone obsessed with cats, leading them to realize it was Patty Williams.

Months later, Bill Spencer, Jr. (Don Diamont) approached an imprisoned Deacon in Genoa City to help him take part of his plans to keep his son Liam Spencer (Scott Clifton) and Deacon's daughter Hope apart. After much reluctance Deacon agrees to help Bill in exchange for his freedom. He goes to Italy (the location of Hope and Liam's wedding) with Bill and his assistant Alison. Deacon is confide to inside when they arrive whilst Bill is out trying to convince Liam's ex-wife Steffy Forrester (Jacqueline MacInnes Wood) to stay in Italy, hinting that something could or may happen to stop the wedding. Deacon, however, is still conflicted about what is to come, knowing that he could potentially destroy his daughter. He is also frustrated as well for not being able to go outside since his release from prison. Being alone with only Alison, Deacon inquires to her about Liam and Hope's relationship. Alison responds by saying whilst she doesn't know Hope very well, she is very much in love with Liam as he is with her. This only makes it harder for Deacon because he genuinely doesn't want to hurt his daughter especially after knowing what she has accomplished with her "Hope for the Future" fashion line and how it is based on her morals and values. However he goes along with Bill's scheme, finally reuniting with his daughter and creating a series of misunderstandings that almost break her and Liam apart. Deacon soon disappears again and despite the many inferences, the wedding happens.

Deacon later returns after learning that the wedding was legally invalid and Liam and Hope are no longer together. Feeling responsible and guilty, He threatens Bill with telling both Liam and Hope the reason behind the demise of their relationship. Unknown to both of them Katie Logan Spencer (Heather Tom), Bill's wife and Hope's aunt had overheard the whole conversation. Confronting both them over what she has heard. Deacon neither denying nor confirming anything exits, leaving Bill to explain to his enraged pregnant wife, who soon goes into early labour.

While Brooke and Ridge (Ronn Moss) were away on their honeymoon, Deacon texted Brooke to inform her that he will be a part of Hope's life, which led to the end of Brooke's marriage to Ridge when Brooke denied having spoken to him. Deacon later confronts Bill again, asking for a job. Bill, however, is less than pleased and again Deacon leaves threatening to tell Liam about what happened in Italy.

=== 2014–2017 ===
Quinn Fuller (Rena Sofer) had just been fired from her job at Forrester Creations and she entered a bar and started drinking. Deacon sat next to her and started talking to her. Quinn mentioned that her son, Wyatt Spencer (Darin Brooks) is in love with Hope Logan and Deacon reveals he's her father. Quinn took an interest in Deacon and gave him her phone number. Deacon goes over to the Logan Mansion and tells Hope that he wants to be there for her and be a better father. Quinn plans for her and Deacon to get Wyatt and Hope together again. Deacon needed something in exchange and told her he needed a place to stay. He asked to stay at her house and Quinn allowed him to stay.

After a delusional reconciliation with Brooke, Deacon started having romantic feelings for Quinn and kissed her twice, but Hope didn't accept that and she tried to convince Deacon that Quinn is using him. Quinn apologized and as she was walking away, pregnant Hope tripped down the patio steps. Deacon got angry with Quinn once he learned Hope fell. Hope was okay but she miscarried the baby. Deacon found Quinn on the roof ready to jump and Bill convincing her to end it. Deacon convinced Quinn to stop and comforted her and yelled at Bill for playing with an upset person's mind. Quinn told Deacon she'd understand if he'd want to leave her but Deacon convinced her not to kill herself again because he can't go on without her.

Quinn began to get nervous with Brooke back in town. Deacon insisted he's committed to her. Brooke texted Deacon to stop by. Brooke had been drinking and explained she's lonely because all the men in her life have left her and she never had to go home without a man to sleep with. Deacon assured her she can always turn to him. Deacon stopped her from drinking and gave her some aspirins and water and left. Brooke put down the aspirins and drank some more alcohol.

Deacon left to grab a bite to eat and ran into Brooke. He sat down with her who was drunk and he carried her to his car while she was embarrassing herself. They arrived at the Logan Mansion when Brooke put on a bikini and started prancing around wanting to go in the pool. Deacon resisted but then kissed Brooke. Deacon apologized and left. Quinn questioned the wait, and deacon explained what happened, subtracting the kiss part. Quinn left to go over to Brooke's who was tipsy and slapped her down to the floor, warning her to stay away from Deacon and her. Wyatt arrived at Quinn's and told Deacon he was concerned. Brooke told Deacon what had happened and Deacon was furious with Quinn. Quinn suggested he'd just leave her if he hates her that much. Deacon stayed and proposed to Quinn, which made her very happy. Deacon informed Brooke about the big news who didn't approve of this. Quinn was eavesdropping and after Deacon left, Quinn entered and stated they are getting married. Brooke insisted that she won't let this happen. Quinn was wary to this to Deacon about what Brooke said, Deacon stated she can't get in their way. Deacon informed Brooke that he absolutely wants to marry Quinn. Deacon admit to Quinn that he's an alcoholic and started attending AA meetings again. Little did Quinn know, that Deacon met up with Brooke at that very same meeting.

One day, Quinn hugged Deacon and smelled perfume and Deacon stated he was helping an AA friend whom Quinn mentioned she never knew was a female. Later when Brooke arrived, Quinn sniffed Brooke and realized the scents match. Quinn is upset that Deacon was helping out Brooke and he explained he's just helping out a friend and Quinn was very angry at Brooke but backed off and was proud of Deacon. But Wyatt overheard Deacon telling Brooke they could have a future together if he wasn't engaged to Quinn. He told his mother who was angry at Deacon at first but afterwards forgave him.

On Deacon and Quinn's wedding day, Brooke crashed it with a laptop showing a live video chat with Hope. Hope tried guilt tripping Deacon into not marrying Quinn. Hope stated it would strain their relationship threatened to exclude him from her life once again. Deacon told Hope sorry and told Brooke to leave. Wyatt gave Quinn and Deacon his blessing and they get married. Months later Quinn tells Wyatt that she and Deacon are separated because their marriage was doomed from the beginning since he's not a Spencer man, the only ones who have ever been able to truly capture her heart. Wyatt peppers her with questions and she says Deacon is a good man and that he went to Europe.

He comes back a few weeks later and Deacon discovers Quinn has kidnapped a memory loss Liam Spencer and that she's making him believe she's his wife. Deacon helps Quinn during the first months but then decides that Liam has to return.

Quinn decides then to bring Liam to visit reef near Topanga with the help of Deacon and, remembering what he had said about making Liam return to his family, threw Deacon into the ocean. Deacon survived and went to search for Quinn. Meanwhile, Liam had been found by Wyatt. With the help of Deacon she managed to escape at first but she was then captured. When she was discharged she started a relationship with Eric Forrester; Deacon told Quinn to pay attention since she's hated by all of Eric's family but she ignores Deacon's advice. When Eric goes to Monte Carlo, Quinn wants to go to with him but his family's there. Deacon books a flight for Quinn. After Steffy saw her in Monte Carlo kissing Eric, Quinn came back to Los Angeles ending his relationship with Eric and told Deacon everything.

In June 2017, Deacon returns to Los Angeles and confronts Quinn, revealing himself as the culprit who has been shooting at her on multiple occasions. Deacon is arrested by lieutenant Baker and sent to prison.

=== 2021–present ===
In October 2021, Deacon is released from a four year prison sentence due to what he describes as "over-crowding" and arrives at Hope and Liam's home at Hope's invitation, much to Liam, Brooke and Ridge's surprise. Hope reveals she's been writing to Deacon in prison and tells the others she can't turn her back on him. After enduring a verbal tirade by Ridge and Brooke, Deacon leaves, only to encounter Sheila Carter (Kimberlin Brown), who after sharing her own story of being forced out of her son's life, encourages him to work with her to remain involved in their children's lives. Deacon's friendship with Sheila eventually turns into a romantic relationship, and they even marry in 2024. In 2025, Deacon's son, Eric (now going by Deke) arrives to town.

== Reception ==
In 2020, Candace Young from Soaps She Knows put Deacon on her list of the hottest soap opera villains, saying that he should be one of the soaps again and that Deacon is "a con and a sexy schemer who has a way with the ladies, who can't seem to resist his bad boy ways. This man can cause a stir like few others – just seeing a shot of his hand holding a glass of whiskey once got viewers riled up!" In 2022, Charlie Mason from Soaps She Knows placed Deacon 22nd on his ranked list of The Bold and the Beautiful’s Best of the Best Characters Ever, commenting that "Sean Kanan's sleazy alter ego did the impossible: made us believe that he cared, really cared for Brooke… even after he took her daughter's virginity while on speakerphone! Top that… well, everyone else!"
