= Sheila Carter =

- The Young and the Restless character
- Kimberlin Brown as Sheila Carter
- Portrayed by: Kimberlin Brown (1990–2006, 2017–present); Michelle Stafford (2006–2007)
- Duration: 1990–1998; 2002–2003; 2005–2007; 2017–2018; 2021–present
- First appearance: May 16, 1990
- Created by: William J. Bell
- Introduced by: Edward J. Scott (1990, 1992–1995); Lee Phillip Bell (1992); Bradley Bell (2002–2003); John F. Smith (2005); Lynn Marie Latham and Josh Griffith (2006); Bradley Bell and Michael Minnis (2017, 2021)
- Crossover appearances: The Bold and the Beautiful
In-universe information
- Other names: Sheila Grainger; Sheila Forrester; Imagination; Sheila Warwick; Sybil Weller; Sheila Lovejoy; Sheila Sharpe; Brenda Harris; Jennifer Mitchell; Phyllis Newman; Betsy; Debra; Nicholina
- Occupation: Waitress; Executive assistant Nurse
- Mother: Molly Carter
- Sisters: Sarah Smythe
- Husband: Scott Grainger, Sr. (1991–1992); Eric Forrester (1993–1995); James Warwick (1997–1998); Deacon Sharpe (2024–2026)
- Sons: John Finnegan; Ryder Callahan
- Daughters: Daisy Carter; Mary Carter Warwick; Diana Carter
- Grandsons: Hayes Finnegan
- Granddaughters: Luna Nozawa; Lucy Romalotti

Sheila Carter is a fictional character from The Young and the Restless and The Bold and the Beautiful, American soap operas on the CBS network. Created by William J. Bell, the role was introduced in 1990 — by Edward J. Scott — under the portrayal of Kimberlin Brown, who portrayed the role from 1990 to 1992 on The Young and the Restless, although she continued to make guest appearance until 1995. From 1992 to 1998, Brown played the role on The Bold and the Beautiful, returning for stints in 2002 and 2003, before returning to The Young and the Restless from 2005 to January 2006. That same year, Michelle Stafford took over the role after Sheila had plastic surgery to look like Phyllis Summers. Brown returned to the role of Sheila on The Bold and the Beautiful from June 9, 2017, to March 23, 2018, and then again from August 6, 2021.

Sheila is known as a villain. A significant portion of Sheila's history on both soaps revolves around her long-running conflict with Lauren Fenmore, whom she has attempted to kill on multiple occasions. She has also had conflicts with Stephanie Forrester, Maggie Forrester, Amber Moore, Taylor Hayes, Brooke Logan, Phyllis Summers, Quinn Fuller, Steffy Forrester, Li Finnegan, Poppy Nozawa and Janet "Sugar" Webber, as well as numerous other characters on both soaps.

== Casting ==
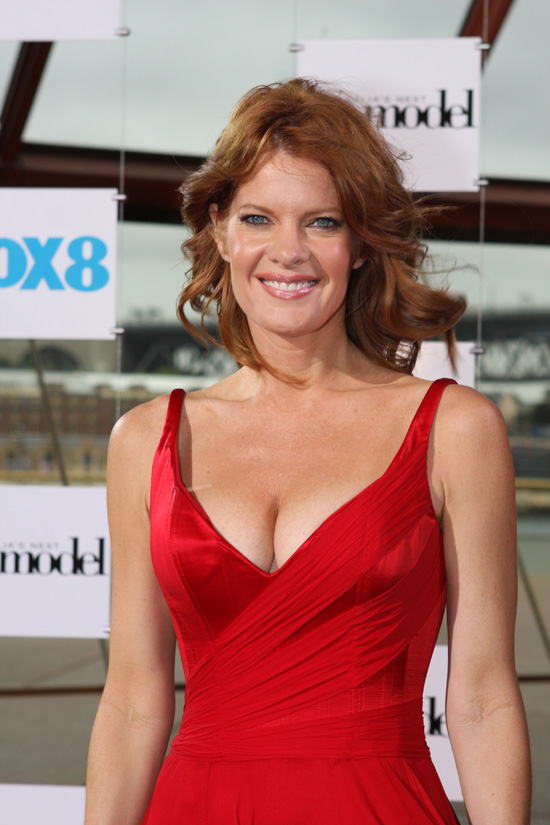
Michelle Stafford portrayed the role for two months when Sheila returned disguised as Phyllis Summers — a role which Stafford has portrayed off-and-on since 1994.

The role was portrayed by Kimberlin Brown for a total of 16 years. Her first run was on The Young and the Restless from May 16, 1990, to May 20, 1992, when the character crossed over to The Bold and the Beautiful from May 21, 1992, to October 2, 1998, again from May 24 to November 5, 2002, and again finally from September 26 to October 10, 2003. Despite being a regular cast member on The Bold and the Beautiful, Brown returned to The Young and the Restless for several guest appearances beginning on October 27, 1992 and departed on November 5, 1992. She continued making guest appearances on November 11, 1992; December 23, 1992; January 7 to 14, 1993; February 19 to March 2, 1993; October 11, 1993; October 19 to 27, 1993; January 12, 1994; February 28 to March 2, 1995; and April 7, 1995.

In July 2005, after a 10-year absence from The Young and the Restless, it was announced that Brown was to reprise the role. At the time, Brown had been appearing on ABC's One Life to Live as Paige Miller, and Brown reportedly opted to leave the role when ABC was unable to match the financial terms of a contract offered to her by CBS. She returned on August 5, 2005, and her run ended on January 11, 2006. However, that December, the character returned, though not portrayed by Brown, but by Michelle Stafford, who in addition portrayed Phyllis Summers. For the reason of Brown not returning to the role, the actress said: "I had a bad accident last year, and when they wanted me back in November, I really couldn't go at that time, and that's why I came back looking like somebody else." Stafford only portrayed the role for two months until February 9, 2007, when Sheila was shot by her longtime enemy Lauren Fenmore and presumed dead.

In 2009, reports speculated that Brown would reprise the role again on The Bold and the Beautiful, which was followed by more rumors speculating a return to The Young and the Restless. "I actually got a call from [B&B head writer and executive producer] Brad Bell a while back asking if I'd be interested in coming back, and I said, 'Sure!' The thing with daytime is that the storylines are [written] so far in advance, you just never know when [you might be needed]," Brown said at the time. When asked where her alter-ego may be "hiding out", Brown said: "I am still getting healthy from my car accident. Right now, Sheila is hiding out in North Carolina—playing golf. But don't worry: Sheila always comes back!"

In June 2017, Kimberlin Brown reprised her role as Sheila on The Bold and the Beautiful. Executive producer Brad Bell announced Brown had been signed to a one-year deal with the serial. She exited the role the following year, departing on March 23, 2018. On August 2, 2021, Soap Opera Digest broke the exclusive announcement that Brown will return to the role as part of the development of John "Finn" Finnegan's (Tanner Novlan) backstory which accompanies the revelation that Sheila is Finn's biological mother. She began airing on Friday, August 6, 2021.

== Development ==
=== Characterization and portrayal ===
"She seduced another woman's husband and stole their child... but if you think that's bold, hold on tight... because the hand that rocked The Young and the Restless is now rocking The Bold and the Beautiful. Sheila lives...

— CBS promoting Kimberlin Brown's crossover as Sheila

On the topic of Sheila "terrorizing" both Genoa City and Los Angeles while on both soaps, Brown said: "You know, I came to L.A. to start a new life. And well they just didn't make it that easy for me, did they? So I might've shot a gun once or twice again, but it wasn't my fault. You know what, people get what they deserve, they really do. I might've poisoned someone by accident, but he never should've talked to me like that. You just don't do that. Anyway, people get what they deserve, and I think a lot of them have what's coming to them, and I'm not sure I'm done yet." About Sheila's personality, Brown said: "Sheila's just evil. There's nothing bitchy about what she does, [I mean] it's very straightforward. She's manipulative but never in a bitchy way, in a way to get things accomplished, and get things done the way she wants to. When being nice and being diplomatic and when being all those things don't work any longer, she snaps." Brown also added that, "To be a good villain, you have to make the character real for you." Discussing Brown's portrayal of Sheila, The Bold and the Beautiful showrunner Bradley Bell stated: "Kimberlin has a gravity and an intensity and a fierceness that few actors are able to bring to the screen. When she dials in her focus? Wow. Her eyes become laser beams. Her voice is whispering but deadly sharp. That's real talent in a very powerful package."

=== Relationships ===
On the topic of Sheila and Lauren's "cat fights", Brown said: "People like cat fights because we can get away with what you can't get away with in everyday life. You're living vicariously through me. There might be someone that [boy] you just might want to put it to someday, and you can't, but you can turn on the TV and see Sheila do it, and get away with it. Being mean and evil and fighting and by the end of the day, you're spent." On Sheila's relationship with Stephanie Forrester, Brown said: "Stephanie made my life miserable. So anyway, I shot Stephanie. I did. Stephanie felt she could be a better provider for my child than I could. And you know what, you don't keep a mother like Sheila away from her child, you just don't do that. And Stephanie couldn't stop me."

Discussing Sheila's return to Los Angeles in 2017, Brown noted that Sheila was "trying to do the right thing and become a good person", but left town again after realizing she could not convince the Forresters that she had changed. Upon her return in 2021, Sheila is revealed to be the mother of John Finnegan and a grandmother to his son with Steffy Forrester. Brown stated: "All Sheila ever wanted to do was to be a part of Eric's life and be a part of the Forrester dynasty (...) Now, she has a grandson [Hayes] that is related to the Forresters. And there's absolutely nothing that the Forresters can do to change the fact that her blood is running through that baby's veins."

== Storylines ==
=== 1990–1992 ===
Sheila was introduced on The Young and the Restless in 1990 as she relocated to Genoa City from Michigan. Sheila is a nurse who works at Genoa City Memorial Hospital and immediately falls in love with the married Dr. Scott Grainger (Peter Barton). Her feelings for Scott quickly turn from infatuation to obsession. In order to steal him away from his wife Lauren Fenmore (Tracey Bregman), Sheila drugs him and has sex with him, resulting in a pregnancy.(Attorney, John Silva, expresses an interest in a relationship with Sheila)At the same time, Lauren also becomes pregnant by Scott but doesn't tell him. When the truth about the father of Sheila's baby comes out, Scott feels obligated, so he thus divorces Lauren and marries Sheila.

Sheila's baby dies at birth, unbeknownst to Scott, and she secretly switches Lauren's newborn with a black market baby, whom Lauren names Dylan. Sheila begins passing Lauren's baby off as her own, and Dylan eventually dies from meningitis. Sheila's mother, Molly Carter (Marilyn Alex), finds out about her daughter's crime and intends to tell Lauren the truth, but Molly suffers a stroke that renders her speechless. Sheila sends her mother to her farmhouse in Michigan before Molly could expose her. Lauren eventually finds out about the baby switch, but not before Sheila kidnaps both Lauren and Molly and almost succeeds in killing both women; during a brief struggle, Lauren accidentally kicks over a lantern on a coffee table, setting the farmhouse they were imprisoned in on fire. Lauren and Molly are rescued by Lauren's ex-husband, private investigator Paul Williams (Doug Davidson), and his secretary, Lynne Bassett (Laura Bryan Birn). Sheila is never found, and authorities presume that she perished in the fire when a body burned beyond recognition turns up in the ashes. The corpse turns out to be that of a meter man that had visited the house just before the fire started; Sheila later escaped from the burning building. Picking up a discarded newspaper in an area diner, Sheila reads about an opening working as a company nurse for the Forresters in Los Angeles. She leaves Wisconsin to travel to California. Meanwhile, Lauren is reunited with Scott and her real son, Scott Jr.

=== 1992–1998 ===
In 1992, Sheila is reintroduced on The Bold and the Beautiful and she quickly worms her way into fashion CEO Eric Forrester (John McCook)'s life by becoming the company nurse at Forrester Creations in Los Angeles, as well as working as Rick Forrester's nanny (after staging an accident that leaves the former nanny, Judy, injured, and later threatening Judy and her family). Sheila and Eric fall in love and are eventually engaged, which angers Eric's ex-wife Stephanie Forrester (Susan Flannery), who suspects Sheila is a gold digger and a liar. To Sheila's dismay, Eric's most recent ex-wife Brooke Logan (Katherine Kelly Lang) is pregnant with a child that may either belong to Eric or his son Ridge Forrester (Ronn Moss). After Bridget Forrester is born, Sheila manipulates the paternity test so that everyone will believe Ridge is the father. Security guard Mike Guthrie (Ken Hanes) catches her in the act and after threatening to blackmail her with the details, Sheila sets loose a vicious dog to attack him.

Meanwhile, Lauren finds out that Sheila is alive and well, and living on the West Coast. Lauren follows her and they once again fight. Lauren threatens to expose Sheila to the Forrester family, but Sheila turns the tables on Lauren by blackmailing her with pictures she took of Lauren sleeping with Brad Carlton (Don Diamont) and sent to Lauren as puzzle pieces. Despite Sheila's love for Eric, she panics when Lauren attempts to disclose her past at the wedding, and leaves a heartbroken Eric at the altar. After the guests leave, Sheila returns to the chapel and pleads for Eric's forgiveness. Although Eric demands answers, he eventually forgives Sheila and the two are married. Sheila and Brooke become close friends. Sheila and Eric's marriage becomes rocky when Sheila accepts a job from Brooke, who seizes control of Forrester Creations with her patent on the BeLieF formula. Eric feels betrayed by her actions and a rift is created in their marriage. Sheila proposes the two take a vacation and use this time to reconnect. The two leave town for Catalina Island. Scott, who became ill, also vacations with Lauren in Catalina Island, where the two run into Eric and Sheila. Lauren intends to use Scott to expose Sheila's past to Eric; however, Scott, still caring for Sheila, keeps mum. Scott eventually dies on the island as a result of his illness. With both women by his side, he wishes that Lauren give Sheila a second chance. Lauren tearfully agrees.

When Sheila becomes concerned that Eric is excluding her from his will, she decides she would be more financially secure if she gave Eric a child. After a one-night stand with former rival Connor Davis (Scott Thompson Baker), Sheila goes to Eric claiming she is pregnant with his child. Eric, who had recently had a vasectomy, tells Sheila he wants a divorce. Brooke's fiancé Dr. James Warwick (Ian Buchanan) turns out to be a friend of Sheila's former psychiatrist Jay Garvin. James suspects Sheila is hiding something from the family, and tries to pry information from Dr. Garvin. However, during a brief struggle, Sheila accidentally pushes Jay off a balcony and to his death. James later learns from Lauren the secrets of her past. After attempting to drown Lauren in a hot tub, Sheila kidnaps James with the help of her new partner-in-crime, the security guard Mike. She imprisons him in the basement of her house (known as "The Houdini House") for some time. When James escapes and her secrets finally surface, she holds Stephanie, Eric, Ridge, Brooke, Lauren and James hostage in the Forrester mansion, welcoming them to her "goodbye party."

At the "party," Sheila tells everyone in attendance how they had personally wronged her, and threatens to kill them. Holding a gun to Stephanie, Sheila has a change of heart when the others step in front of her, and swallows a bottle of poison. Having survived, Sheila is placed in a psychiatric hospital, under the care of Dr. Brian Carey (Kin Shriner), but does not remain there for long, despite Stephanie's attempts to keep her there. Sheila tries to revive her friendship with Brooke, who sides with her at first, but later wants nothing to do with her. She begins dating neighbor Grant Chambers (Charles Grant), and later her psychiatrist, James Warwick. She continues to see James at this time, and memories of her abusive childhood are revealed.

Sheila meets Maggie Forrester (Barbara Crampton), whom she befriends. The two are amazed to discover they both have ties to the same family. When Stephanie attempts to take Brooke's children, Sheila poisons her by replacing her medication with mercury pills until Stephanie losing her sanity and she is inpatient in a psychiatric hospital. Sheila also makes an enemy of Forrester Creations' rival, Sally Spectra (Darlene Conley) who defends Stephanie to her, thus planting the seeds of the eventual friendship between Stephanie and Sally. Ultimately Sheila frames Maggie for the poisoning of Stephanie, but later Maggie realizing who was behind the poisoning, fights with Sheila and accidentally pushes her onto a fire poker, seriously injuring her. After the fire poker incident, Sheila sets her sights on proving to James that she has changed for the better, in the hopes that he will fall in love with her. However, James has feelings for Maggie instead. Maggie goes to Sheila's house to inform her that she needs to find a new therapist, because Maggie wouldn't allow her to see James anymore. As Maggie taunts her, Sheila snaps and nearly chokes Maggie to death. Mike later kidnaps her and holds her prisoner at an amusement park. Sheila, wanting to prove to James that she had changed, agrees to release Maggie.

After having crashed James and Maggie's wedding, Sheila reveals that she has become pregnant after a night alone with James. The three come to a settlement that Sheila would temporarily stay with them until her baby was born, and the child would be given to James and Maggie. After Sheila hands her baby, Mary, over to the Warwicks, she relocates to Death Valley, where she meets Amber Moore (Adrienne Frantz). Anxious to see her daughter, Sheila suggests that Amber babysit for James and Maggie, so that she can secretly visit Mary in LA. Amber is hired and keeps her alliance with Sheila secret for some time, but when Sheila threatens her, she reveals to James and Maggie the real reason why she applied to be Mary's babysitter. Sheila eventually takes matters into her own hands and takes Mary back. James attempts to trick Sheila into marrying him, so that he can gain full custody of his daughter. When Sheila realizes the marriage is a set-up, she attempts to kill herself again by jumping off a roof. James, who had actually fallen for Sheila during this time, promises to stay with her. Meanwhile, an angry Maggie sneaks into Sheila's hospital room and cuts off her oxygen. Sheila is rescued by doctors and Maggie is immediately arrested. With the help of Mike and his brother Martin, a desperate Maggie captures Sheila and holds her prisoner, appropriately, in the house from Psycho at Universal Studios Hollywood. When Sheila escapes, James demands that Maggie leave. Lauren, Stephanie, Maggie and Judy later team up in an attempt to drive Sheila over the edge. They wire Sheila's house with hidden cameras and an audio system, while Judy surprises Sheila on her doorstep. The plan fails, however, and Maggie, realizing James and the baby are lost to her, leaves town. When a friendship begins between James and Stephanie, a paranoid Sheila becomes jealous and attempts to drown Stephanie in a pool. To prevent Stephanie from telling anyone about this incident, Sheila threatens to kill Stephanie's grandson, Thomas Forrester. Sheila is arrested for the threat, but secretly switches places with a woman named Sybil. After breaking out of prison in disguise, Sheila shoots Stephanie, kidnaps baby Mary and leaves town.

=== 2002–2003 ===
Sheila returns to Los Angeles four years later to find her now-teenage daughter Mary (whom she had renamed Erica Lovejoy) (Courtnee Draper). Erica, who is completely unaware of her mother's past or her own real name, has traveled to L.A. to meet her idol—Amber Forrester. She soon develops a crush on Amber's husband, Rick Forrester, although she never intends to act on her feelings. Sheila convinces Erica to seduce Rick, saying that a Forrester man would never abandon the woman carrying his child. She then pays off a man named Lance to drug Amber and take her to bed. Amber tracks Lance down and begins to question him. When a nervous Lance threatens to tell Amber everything, Sheila kills him by releasing a jar of bees into his apartment. Amber becomes increasingly suspicious and confronts Erica in Rick's office. During a struggle, Erica falls and hits her head on a desk, making Amber look guilty of pushing her. At the hospital, a disguised Sheila confronts Amber, warning her to stay away from her daughter. Amber decides to look for clues at Erica's apartment, but is impeded when Sheila throws a pot at the window and the police arrive, arresting Amber and causing the Forresters to distrust her further. Meanwhile, while browsing through a photo album of Eric's, Erica is startled to find a picture of her mother. She learns that Sheila was formerly married to Eric, and that her mother wants her to live the life she had always dreamed of with Rick. Sheila pushes Erica to have sex with Rick, so that she can live vicariously as a Forrester through her daughter.

As a reluctant Erica is about to carry out her mother's plan, Rick's brother Ridge bursts in and exposes Erica's true identity. Rick kicks Erica out, but not before Sheila kidnaps Amber, who is stunned to learn that Erica is really Mary Warwick. Sheila stages a crime scene and drags Amber off to her apartment. Massimo Marone (Joseph Mascolo), who had been romantically involved with Sheila for a short time, gets a call from her, and Stephanie recognizes her voice. The two track Sheila and Amber down. Sheila then flees and holds Eric and Taylor Hayes Forrester (Hunter Tylo) hostage at the mansion. But when Brooke walks into the room, a struggle ensues in which Taylor and Brooke are shot. Brooke survives her wounds, whereas Taylor succumbs (a few years later, Taylor was revealed to still be alive). Sheila is arrested and subsequently confronted by her daughter, who condemns Sheila's actions and wants nothing to do with her. Sheila is jailed for her crimes but soon escapes with the help of a sympathetic warden named Sugar (Robin Mattson).

She then kidnaps Ridge and Brooke, while on their South American honeymoon. Soon Ridge's half-brother Nick Marone (Jack Wagner) arrives to rescue Ridge but he is soon captured by Sheila as well. When Ridge and Nick's father, Massimo, arrives to deliver the ransom, Sheila reveals that she had a baby daughter, Diana, whom she claims to be the result of the fling she had with Massimo during her previous trip to L.A. When Massimo tries (unsuccessfully) to trick Sheila into handing over the infant, she and Sugar run away. Brooke and Nick are soon rescued; however, it is believed that Ridge had been burned to death in the foundry Sheila stashed him in. Soon after, it is revealed that Ridge had survived, and he reunites with Brooke on the island.

=== 2005–2007 ===
Sheila returns to Genoa City (on The Young and the Restless) after being unseen for ten years, and begins terrorizing Lauren Fenmore once again, by indirectly turning her now-adult son Scott (Blair Redford) against her under the alias of "Brenda Harris". It is soon revealed that the woman in the psychiatric hospital who was believed to be Sheila is actually Sugar; Sheila drugged and had Sugar's face altered with plastic surgery to resemble her own before turning her into the police. Sheila then disguises herself as a British woman named "Jennifer Mitchell" by putting on a fake accent and donning a wig, prosthetic nose, and dentures to change her appearance. As Jennifer, she allies with Tom Fisher (Roscoe Born), who helps her in her scheme to poison Lauren with a necklace that Scott offers to his mother as a gift. In exchange, Tom has Sheila manipulate his estranged wife Gloria Abbott (Judith Chapman) into giving him money and later bailing him out of prison.

When Lauren plans a rooftop dinner with her fiancé Michael Baldwin (Christian LeBlanc), Sheila surprises her and persuades her to commit suicide by jumping off of the roof. Lauren believes Sheila is a hallucination, but before she can jump, Michael rescues her. At the hospital, Sheila dons her Jennifer Mitchell identity and attempts to inject the poison into Lauren's bloodstream but is interrupted. She then convinces Tom — Michael's stepfather — to help her abduct Lauren from a yacht while on her honeymoon with Michael. She plants a bomb on the yacht, hoping to kill both Lauren and Tom, whom she wants to take the fall for their crimes. Tom realizes Sheila's plan, and traps both Sheila and Lauren in a bomb shelter. Tom leaves the two together and in the meantime is shot and killed by John Abbott (Jerry Douglas). As the bomb shelter collapses, Lauren is astonished when Sheila saves her life. Meanwhile, Sugar manages to leave the psychiatric hospital and goes to see Scott, who believes she is Sheila. He, however, notices her voice sounds different, and Sugar tells him she has a cold and has lost her voice. Sugar then proceeds to stab him in order to exact her revenge on Sheila. Sugar is arrested; upon seeing her, Lauren immediately knows it is not Sheila whose ankle is sprained. The real Sheila (now walking on crutches and having shed her false identity) is seen in a plastic surgeon's office, asking for a procedure to look like somebody else.

Later, it is revealed that Sheila is still alive, having undergone months of plastic surgery to look like Phyllis Summers (Michelle Stafford), and that Paul Williams had been hiding the fact that he had been keeping her locked in a cage she had constructed in an abandoned warehouse (Paul had lied to Lauren and Michael, telling them Sheila had got hit by a car and died after her surgery). Ultimately, Sheila is determined to escape and take Phyllis's place in order to infiltrate Michael and Lauren's lives. Sheila is accidentally freed from the prison she created for Lauren by Maggie Sullivan, Paul's girlfriend. After acting as a kidnap victim and pleading for Maggie's help, Maggie sets her free, but Sheila chokes her unconscious, steals her gun, and then shoots her—but Maggie survives.

Subsequently, Paul returns to the warehouse only to be ambushed by Sheila who imprisons both Paul and Maggie in that cage. At a different location, Sheila cuts and dyes her hair to look like Phyllis. Sheila then goes to Phyllis's, ties her up and waits for Lauren and baby Fen (Sheila had invited, imitating Phyllis over the phone) to arrive while taunting Phyllis about how great it would be to take over her life with her husband Nicholas Newman (Joshua Morrow) and her baby Summer. After Lauren arrives, Sheila ties her up, and Sheila later flees with Phyllis and babies Fen and Summer as hostages. By this time, Michael arrives at the warehouse and frees Paul and Maggie, the latter being taken to the hospital.

Posing as an elderly woman named Betsy, Sheila takes Phyllis, Summer, and Fen to a nearby retirement home to hide out. At some point, in a case of psychological transference, Sheila starts calling Fen "Scotty." After learning of their location, Lauren goes to that home carrying a gun in her purse. Meanwhile, Sheila orders Phyllis to put on an outfit to look exactly like her. The ladies then start fighting over the gun. Following a tip from a neighbor, Lauren finds Sheila's apartment and forces her way inside. Lauren, holding the ladies at gunpoint, asks: "Which one of you is Phyllis?" Sheila and Phyllis then argue over who is who, and Lauren screams at them to stop. Sheila then runs to grab baby Summer in order to use her as a shield against Lauren; Phyllis tells Lauren to point the gun at her to protect her daughter, and a frightened Lauren, realizing the real Phyllis would never put her daughter in the line of fire, turns to Sheila and shoots her. Sheila is then declared dead at the scene.

=== 2010, 2012 ===
In 2010, Sarah Smythe (Bregman), Sheila's sister, arrives in Genoa City. Having assumed Lauren's identity through extensive plastic surgery, Sarah holds both Phyllis and the real Lauren responsible for her sister's untimely death. Sarah devises a plan with Daisy Carter (Yvonne Zima) and Ryder Callahan (Wilson Bethel), Sheila's twins with Tom Fisher, to take over Lauren's life and riches. The plan fails, with Lauren shooting and killing Sarah in self-defense after Sarah's attempt to fire her gun at Phyllis.

In 2012, a woman claiming to be Daisy's mother checks her out of the Fairview mental institution, signing the name "Sheila Carter" on the release form. Michael has the signature analyzed to see if it fits Sheila's handwriting, but the results turn out to be inconclusive.

=== 2017–present ===
Sheila (Brown) returns to Los Angeles in June 2017. When she attempts to leave Katie Logan (Heather Tom)'s home without being noticed, Quinn Forrester (Rena Sofer) hears her leaving, immediately asking who she is. Introducing herself as a friend of the Logan family, Sheila reveals herself to Katie, asking for her assistance in making amends with those she had wronged in Los Angeles. Startled by her arrival, Katie immediately alerts Eric of Sheila's re-appearance; arriving at Katie's and believing that Sheila is the one who shot at Quinn, Eric escorts Sheila to the police station, and has her arrested for violating an order of protection he had previously filed years prior. When it is revealed that Deacon Sharpe (Sean Kanan) is the one who was targeting Quinn, Eric extends an olive branch to Sheila, welcoming her back to the Forrester estate, much to the disapproval of Quinn and Ridge (Thorsten Kaye). Sheila immediately begins to dig into the life of Eric, rooting herself into his marriage with Quinn. After scheming with Forrester security officer, Charlie Webber, Sheila exposes Quinn's kiss with Ridge.

As Sheila comforts and supports an emotionally hurt Eric, she is confronted by Steffy Forrester (Jacqueline MacInnes Wood), who — believing Sheila to be armed — shoots her in Eric's hotel room, but she survives, only sustaining a flesh wound. Sheila continues to insinuate herself into Eric's life, faking a concussion after a catfight with Quinn to manipulate Eric into letting her stay in the Forrester mansion. Sheila blackmails her ex-husband, James Warwick, into lying about the severity of her condition, but slips up when Quinn catches her walking around normally. She then gets a waitressing job in town so she can eavesdrop on the residents of Los Angeles, and later offers Eric's estate manager Mateo money to seduce Quinn, but her plan is foiled when Mateo tells Quinn the truth. Sheila is thrilled when Eric invites her to the Forrester mansion with the intention of replacing Quinn's portrait with Sheila's, but this turns out to be a ruse. As Eric and Quinn again demand that Sheila leave, Sheila smiles to herself outside the closed mansion door.

Sheila re-emerges following the wedding of Steffy and John Finnegan (Tanner Novlan) in 2021, revealing to the latter she is his biological mother. Sheila tells him that she gave him up but kept tabs on him over the years, from afar. Finn is excited to finally meet his birth mother, and wants everyone to meet her. Though unbeknownst to him, she already knows them. Everyone is shocked to see her, and believe she is lying. Finn's father, Jack Finnegan (Ted King), confirms Sheila contacted him when Finn was a baby. As she tells Steffy that she is her mother-in-law she looks up and gives an evil grin while looking at Stephanie's portrait over the fireplace.

Jack later comes to visit Sheila in her hotel room and attempts to convince her to leave town so that she stays away from Finn, Steffy and their son, Hayes. During this exchange, it is revealed that Finn is, in fact, the product of an illicit sexual relationship between Sheila and Jack while he was married to Finn's adoptive mother, Li Finnegan (Naomi Matsuda). Unbeknownst to Li and Finn, Sheila gave Finn up as a newborn, and Jack arranged a secret adoption of his own biological son in order to keep his affair with Sheila buried. Sheila later blackmails Jack with this information in order to have more access to Finn and Hayes. Sheila then encourages Jack tell Finn and Li the truth—so he does.

Following a chance encounter with Deacon Sharpe, who had recently been released from prison, Sheila and Deacon ally to help each other reunite with their estranged children. In 2022 and 2023, Sheila drugs Brooke, a recovering alcoholic; Sheila intentionally shoots Steffy and accidentally shoots Finn; Sheila escapes from jail; Sheila chokes Li and then rams her car into hers during a car chase, thus causing Li's car to explode and fall in the ocean; Sheila fakes her own bear attack death and cuts off her own toe in order to make it more believable; Sheila confesses to two incidents including a major crime (the murder of Lance Day) to Bill, and Sheila goes to jail as a result; Sheila is released from jail; Sheila saves her step-granddaughter's Kelly's life. In 2024, Sheila is presumed dead after a confrontation Steffy has with a woman she identifies as Sheila and then stabs; it is later revealed it was Sugar, not Sheila, who was killed by Steffy.

After being rescued by Finn and Deacon, Sheila returns to her occupation as a waitress at Il Giardino. Tom Starr, the man who tipped Finn and Deacon off about Sheila's location during her captivity, ends up being murdered by Li's niece Luna Nozawa who is mortified by the thought of having Tom, a poor, homeless man, as a father. Luna also murders Hollis to keep him from telling anyone about her paternity. After kidnapping and attempting to murder Steffy who found out about her schemes, Luna is arrested and goes to prison. Weeks later, after meeting with Luna who had been violently assaulted in prison, Bill Spencer arranges for Luna to secretly spend the remainder of her sentence at his mansion (Luna is made to wear an ankle monitor).

Li, who has grown suspicious, arranges for late Tom Starr's liver to be extracted so she can test his DNA against Luna's. The test reveals that Starr is not the father. Li is therefore even more convinced that her ex-husband Jack is Luna's father, which would mean that her sister Poppy Nozawa betrayed her by sleeping with her then husband. After demanding a blood test, Li is forced to admit that Jack is not Luna's father, which arises Finn's own suspicions. Finn tells Poppy about his suspicions he had raised with her a long time ago. Poppy once again flat-out denies the possibility of Finn being Luna's father, even though they had been carnally intimate at a time when Finn was living in the Nozawa family home; Finn was a college student at the time, and Poppy became pregnant soon afterwards. In order to know the truth for sure, Finn runs his own paternity test, and he finds out the truth—he is indeed Luna's father, which makes Sheila Luna's biological grandmother and Li Luna's adoptive grandmother. When Deacon's son Eric (now going by Deke) returns to Los Angeles in 2025 and reveals that Luna is alive (after believed to have died), Sheila confronted by Deacon, revealing she knew Luna was alive.

== Reception ==
Sheila is often considered to be one of the most popular villains in daytime. Kimberlin Brown was nominated for a Daytime Emmy in the role as Outstanding Supporting Actress in 1993 and 2022.

Michael Logan of TV Insider described Sheila as "the greatest soap villain ever". The Bold and the Beautiful showrunner Bradley Bell highlighted the character's ability "to have viewers care about her and root for her", but also "invoke true fear in the audience".

In 2022, Charlie Mason from Soaps She Knows placed Sheila fifth on his list of the best 25 characters from The Young and the Restless, commenting "They broke the mold when they made "Evil Nurse Sheila" — and thank heavens they did! Kimberlin Brown's baby-swapping man-stealer was so rotten to the core that she couldn't be contained by one soap opera; nope, the lovelorn psycho crossed over to sister show The Bold and the Beautiful and wound up being killed off more often than nemesis Lauren Fenmore's been married!" That same year, Mason also placed Sheila 23rd on his ranked list of The Bold and the Beautiful’s Best of the Best Characters Ever and criticised her 2017 return, commenting "too horrific a monster for The Young and the Restless alone, Lauren Fenmore's archenemy crossed over to The Bold and the Beautiful, only to ultimately… wait, what?!? Become a waitress at [the restaurant called] Il Giardino? That can't be right… can it?"
