= List of The Bold and the Beautiful characters introduced in the 2000s =

The Bold and the Beautiful is a long-running American soap opera which has aired on CBS since March 23, 1987. This is a list of characters that debuted in the between 2000 and 2009, in order of first appearance.

== Morgan DeWitt ==
Morgan DeWitt was portrayed by Sarah Buxton from 2000 to 2001, and again in 2005. Brought in by Brooke as a designer at Forrester Creations in 2000, Morgan had previously had an affair with Ridge in the 1980's. Meeting with Stephanie's disapproval, Morgan aborted the child at the time. On arriving in LA in 2000, she befriended Ridge's then-wife Taylor Hayes Forrester. Before long she confessed to Ridge about the 80's abortion, and soon after this it was revealed she wanted Ridge's child. While Taylor was out of town on a business trip, Morgan tricked Ridge into sleeping with her by faking an email from 'Taylor' signalling her approval for him to inseminate her.

Morgan was revealed to be pregnant in the months that followed, and tried to tell anyone who asked that she had been artificially inseminated. Along the way Morgan exhibited increasingly unhinged behavior - trying to have her confidante Clarke Garrison killed with a python and vowing revenge on Stephanie for not only the 80's abortion, but trying to drug her while pregnant this time to have her miscarry the child.

Once Ridge learned of Morgan's pregnancy, he resolved to tell Taylor. Taylor then confronted Morgan at Ridge and Taylor's Bel Air mansion, where Morgan fell from the second level landing onto the marble floor, losing her child.

This only deepened Morgan's psychosis - she kidnapped Ridge and Taylor's young daughter Steffy and held her hostage as though she were her own daughter. With her hair dyed red, she renamed Steffy 'Stacey'. With the Forresters presuming Steffy dead (the incident in which Morgan had kidnapped her happened on a boat in St Thomas and she was presumed eaten by sharks), it wasn't long until Taylor twigged that something wasn't quite right. Visiting Morgan's home, Taylor heard Steffy and went to save her presumed-dead daughter, but Morgan imprisoned her as well, with the help of psychiatrist Tim Reid.

With Taylor now having disappeared and Ridge confused, Morgan began to move in and attempt to seduce her long-time unrequited love, but Taylor continued to leave small clues that undermined Ridge's trust in Morgan and left him wondering more and more about Taylor's whereabouts. Enough clues gathered for Ridge - including a rogue phone call made to him by Steffy - to realise where Taylor was. He drove his car into Morgan's home, rescuing his daughter and wife while Morgan escaped.

Weeks later, the Forresters held a party to celebrate Steffy and Taylor's safe return home. Hiring clowns to entertain the children, it would be little surprise to anyone that Morgan and Tim took up those roles to infiltrate once more. After the party had finished, Morgan hung around and attempted to drown Stephanie, the two trading several blows before Eric arrived to haul her off Stephanie and hold her until she was arrested by police.

DeWitt reappeared in 2005 after a disoriented Ridge arrived at Cafe Russe. After he collapsed in front of her suffering some kind of memory lapse, she took him back to her hotel room and ultimately off to Venice, removing his wedding ring (he had recently re-married Brooke Logan) and taking advantage of his memory issues by pretending they were together.

When Ridge's memory began returning and Amber Moore arrived - separately - in Venice, Morgan's plan unravelled, and with the arrival of her mother Natalie - a neurologist - it all came undone. Amber took Ridge back to LA to a waiting Brooke, while Morgan broke down and Natalie promising to get her the help she needs.

== Massimo Marone ==
Massimo Marone
- The Bold and the Beautiful character
- Portrayed by: Joseph Mascolo
- Duration: 2001–06
- First appearance: August 23, 2001
- Last appearance: July 7, 2006
- Introduced by: Bradley Bell
In-universe information
- Occupation: Shipping magnate
- Family: Marone
- Father: Massimo Marone III
- Wife: Jackie Payne (2003–04)
- Sons: Ridge Forrester; Nick Marone
- Daughters: Diana Carter
- Grandsons: Thomas Forrester; Ridge "RJ" Forrester Jr.; Jack Marone
- Granddaughters: Phoebe Forrester; Steffy Forrester; Nicole Marone
- Grandparents: Massimo Marone II

Massimo Marone IV is a fictional character from the CBS soap opera The Bold and the Beautiful. He was portrayed by Joseph Mascolo.

Massimo Marone attended college at Northwestern University in Evanston, Illinois, with Stephanie Douglas, Eric Forrester, and Beth Henderson. Massimo dated Stephanie prior to her dating Eric, who was involved with Beth. Stephanie got pregnant and married Eric; Massimo went on to build the shipping conglomerate Marone Industries.

In November 2003, whilst discussing the current storylines and characters of The Bold and the Beautiful, Nancy M. Reichardt from the Edmonton Journal opined that the reveal that Ridge was Massimo's biological son put a "devastating story in motion"; she called Massimo "a man who must be reckoned with, and, of course, he comes with ties to both the Forresters and the Spectras" and believed that there was "enough of a story to play here for years to come" when it was revealed that Massimo is also Nick's biological father.

== Antonio Domínguez ==
Antonio 'Tony' Domínguez was portrayed by Paulo Benedeti from 2001 to 2002, and again from 2012 and 2013, and in 2017.

A young latin fashion designer, Dominguez was hired by Sally Spectra to help rebuild their company with a new look in 2001. Early in his tenure at Spectra, he was wooed by Forrester Creations, with head designer Eric Forrester sending his recently returned daughter Kristen to convince Tony to work at Forrester instead.

Tony stayed loyal to Spectra, but ended up romancing Kristen instead. Their deep, shared bond developed quickly, but was threatened very early on when an ex of Tony's - Ellen - was revealed to have died of AIDS. With Taylor's help, Tony began to understand and process his ultimate diagnosis - he was HIV positive.

While Kristen was understanding and willing to maintain the relationship, Tony tried to push her away, but their romance continued to develop in spite of opposition from Eric. Kristen proposed to Tony late in 2001 and they were married soon after, with Eric eventually accepting their union.

Tony and Kristen honeymooned in Africa and met a child at the orphanage named Zende. The bond grew fast and in the weeks after their trip, they decided to return to Africa and bring Zende back to LA as their adopted son.

Tony and Kristen are understood to have lived in Florida since 2002, with the pair making regular visits back to LA for key family events, such as the death of Stephanie Forrester (2012), Christmas (2013) and son Zende's wedding to Nicole Avant (2017).

== Zende Forrester Domínguez ==
Zende Forrester Dominguez
- The Bold and the Beautiful character
- Portrayed by: Daniel E. Smith (2001–2005); Rome Flynn (2015–2017); Delon de Metz (2020–present)
- Duration: 2001–2002; 2005; 2015–2017; 2020–present
- First appearance: December 11, 2001
- Created by: Bradley Bell
- Introduced by: Bradley Bell
In-universe information
- Occupation: Photographer and designer
- Family: Forrester (adoptive)
- Adoptive father: Antonio Domínguez
- Adoptive mother: Kristen Forrester
- Wife: Nicole Avant (2017–2020)
- Grandparents: Eduardo Dominguez; Lilian Dominguez; Eric Forrester; Stephanie Forrester
- Uncles: Rick Forrester; Marcus Forrester; Ridge Forrester; Thorne Forrester
- Aunts: Bridget Forrester; Angela Forrester; Felicia Forrester
- First cousins: Thomas Forrester; Steffy Forrester; Phoebe Forrester; Alexandria Forrester; R.J. Forrester; Dino Damiano; Nicole Marone; Logan Knight; Rosie Forrester; Lizzy Forrester

Zende Forrester Dominguez is a fictional character from the CBS soap opera The Bold and the Beautiful. The character was played by Daniel E. Smith on a recurring basis from 2001 to 2002 and made guest appearances in 2005 and then by Rome Flynn, as a series regular, since June 29, 2015. In August 2017, Flynn announced he would leave the role of his own decision and makes his last appearance on September 8, 2017. In July 2020, Daytime Confidential announced Delon de Metz had been cast in the role; he made his first appearance on October 7, 2020.

While honeymooning in Africa, newly married Kristen Forrester and Antonio "Tony" Dominguez noticed that they had lost a roll of film. A mysterious boy showed up with the film to return it. As they began to talk to him they formed a bond with him. The boy, named Zende, invited them to visit him before they left the country. Kristen and Antonio were shocked to discover that Zende had been orphaned when both parents died of AIDS. Zende had lived at an orphanage with his younger brother, but sadly, his brother also died of the disease. To help pay his way, Zende worked around the orphanage and helped take care of the younger children. Kristen and Tony discovered when Zende became too old to live in the orphanage he would probably end up on the streets or working anywhere he could find work.

On their return to Los Angeles, Kristen and Tony admitted that Zende had never left their thoughts. They had both been drafting letters to send him. Since Antonio had been battling HIV himself, he felt a special connection to Zende; the couple saw this as the first chance to have a family of their own. They decided to rush back to Africa and start adoption proceedings immediately. They legally adopted young Zende, choosing to give him both of their surnames.

Zende went to live with Kristen and Tony, who have since left Los Angeles (with Zende) and are currently living in Florida. In 2015, after a ten-year absence, Zende returned to Los Angeles and is happily greeted by his uncle Ridge Forrester. Zende decides to follow in the footsteps of his family and is hired as an intern at Forrester Creations, along with Nicole Avant, whom Zende takes a liking to. He attends the wedding of his uncle Rick Forrester and Nicole's sister Maya Avant as her date. When Nicole tells him that his cousin Thomas Forrester unexpectedly kissed her, Zende is not fazed by it. In fact, he asks Nicole out on a date and even gives her a kiss. They then decide to officially become a couple. He even supports her when she decides to be Rick and Maya's surrogate despite objections from her parents.

== Sofia Alonso ==
Sofia Alonso is a former Spectra Creations model. She is the confidante and former lover of Antonio Dominguez. She was portrayed by Sandra Vidal from 2001 to 2003.

== Ziggy Deadmarsh ==
Ziggy Deadmarsh was portrayed by Matt Borlenghi from April 26, 2002 (episode 3784) to September 4, 2002 (episode 3876).

Ziggy is introduced as a landlord of an apartment complex who shows an available apartment to Erica Lovejoy. Erica agrees to rent it from him.

== Lance Day ==
Lance Day was portrayed by Adam Huss from July 19, 2002 (episode 3844) to August 6, 2002 (episode 3856).

Lance is introduced as a friend of Ziggy Deadmarsh and as an aspiring model and actor. He is tasked by Sheila Carter to drug Amber Moore, with the aim of breaking Amber and her husband Rick Forrester up and enable her daughter Erica Lovejoy (Mary Carter) to romance Rick instead.

When Lance threatens Sheila with blowing her cover to the Forresters, she murders him by filling his apartment with bees, to which he is allergic.

== Tricia Quick ==
Tricia Quick was played by Tamara Davies from 2002 to 2003. A psychiatrist like Taylor, Tricia is introduced in the days following Taylor's apparent death in 2002. Pre-arranged by Taylor to help with Ridge and his family's grief, she takes a dislike to Brooke quickly and is egged on in this by Stephanie.

While helpful to the family in their immediate grief, Tricia quickly fades to the background, moving in - briefly - with Thorne and sharing a short romance with him before he pursued back-from-the-dead Macy Alexander.

== Samantha Kelly ==
Samantha Kelly was played by Sydney Penny from 2003 to 2005. Richard Simms from Soaps She Knows noted how Samantha left the show in 2005 with Hector and had an "incredibly short shelf [life]".

Samantha was brought onto the canvas at Stephanie's behest as a potential love interest for Ridge in 2003. An attempt to distract him from Brooke - who was being wooed by Nick at the time - Samantha's overtures ultimately failed and she was largely a character used for exposition dialogue until the death of her small pomeranian dog 'Pucci' in 2004. This revealed that Samantha had a daughter who she believed to have died, but when she ran into Hector Ramirez - the father of said child - she realised that her mother had lied about her daughter's death and that she was very much alive. Samantha met her daughter Caitlin, then she and Hector became engaged, but their romance seemingly fizzled out, Samantha leaving town in 2005 with Caitlin in tow, leaving Hector behind to romance recently back-from-the-dead Taylor Hayes.

== April Knight ==
April Knight is the twin sister of Amber Moore. As with Amber, the role was portrayed by Adrienne Frantz in 2003.

== Nick Marone ==
Nick Marone
- The Bold and the Beautiful character
- Portrayed by: Jack Wagner
- Duration: 2003–2012; 2022; 2025
- First appearance: March 28, 2003
- Last appearance: August 13, 2025
- Created by: Bradley Bell
- Crossover appearances: The Price Is Right; Let's Make a Deal
In-universe information
- Other names: Dominick Marone; Dominick Payne; Nick Payne
- Occupation: Businessman
- Family: Marone
- Father: Massimo Marone
- Mother: Jackie Marone
- Half-brothers: Ridge Forrester
- Half-sisters: Diana Carter
- Wife: Bridget Forrester (2005–2006, 2008, 2009–2010); Brooke Logan (2006–2007); Taylor Hayes (2007–2008)
- Sons: Jack Marone
- Adoptive children: Hope Logan
- Nephews: Thomas Forrester; R.J. Forrester
- Nieces: Steffy Forrester; Phoebe Forrester
- Other relatives: Douglas Forrester; Kelly Spencer; Hayes Finnegan

Nick Marone is a fictional character who was originated by Jack Wagner on March 28, 2003. Much of Nick's storylines has revolved around his relationships with Bridget Forrester, her mother Brooke Logan, Brooke's sisters Donna and Katie Logan, and Brooke's longtime rival Taylor Hayes. Wagner departed without on-screen explanation, following speculation that he was taken off his contract. In April 2025, it was announced Wagner would reprise the role for a "story arc". Nick returned during the June 16 episode.

Nick Payne arrives in town after a shipwreck. Soon, he is romancing Brooke Logan. This eventually puts him at odds with her fiancé, Ridge Forrester. Their rivalry is exacerbated when his mother, Jacqueline Payne, reveals to Nick that he is the son of his employer, billionaire shipping magnate Massimo Marone making him Ridge's half-brother. Brooke chooses to marry Ridge. They go on their honeymoon in South America, where Ridge is kidnapped by a group of thugs working for Sheila Carter, a criminal who killed Ridge's wife Taylor Hayes. While saving Ridge, Brooke and Nick end up also being held captive by Sheila, demanding gold from Massimo. Ridge falls into a furnace and is presumed dead. While grieving, Brooke and Nick have sex. It is later revealed that Ridge is alive. Brooke realizes she is pregnant and is unsure if Ridge or Nick is the father. A DNA test reveals Nick is the father but months its later revealed that Ridge is actually the father. Brooke nearly marries Nick but the wedding is stopped by Ridge. Nick later had a brief romance with Ridge's half-sister, Felicia Forrester. She returned to L.A with a son called Dominick. Later, Nick begins to romance Bridget Forrester. They get married (a small interruption in their ceremony which reveals that Taylor Hayes was alive stops the initial wedding) at the Forrester Mansion. Bridget becomes pregnant, but finds out that Nick and her own mother, Brooke, had begun an affair. She faked an abortion. Nick and Bridget's stillborn baby Nicole was born in early 2006. They split up soon after. Nick, wanting Brooke back, stopped her wedding to Ridge and succeeded. Brooke and Nick finally married soon afterward. On one of the fashion show television shows Ridge purposely gave Brooke a scandalizing kiss causing Nick to lose it. Ridge continues his constant sexual advances to Brooke to try to break up Nick and Brooke and decides to put Brooke's sister Donna Logan on as lead model for Brooke's Bedroom to make Brooke jealous. Brooke leaves Nick in their bedroom in a huff when she sees Donna on television scantily clad and representing Brooke's Bedroom and goes to Ridge's house to confront him about it. Nick later slept with Bridget. Also during this time, Jackie falls off the staircase at the Forrester mansion and falsely claims that Stephanie pushed her. Nick blackmails Eric Forrester and the rest of the Forresters into selling him Forrester Creations or Stephanie will face charges. Brooke, furious at Nick's treatment of the Forresters, sells him her stock as well, ends her marriage to Nick and returns to Ridge.

After many problems, Nick underwent therapy with Taylor. He told her about Jackie's days in Seattle, when she became a prostitute to support herself and Nick. Stephanie overhears Taylor recording her notes of Nick's session and publicly announces Jackie's past at the first Forrester Creations fashion show under Nick's management. Much turmoil followed between Nick and the Forresters. Despite the growing animosity between the Forresters and the Marones, Taylor remained Nick's friend. After Taylor's relationship with Thorne ended. Taylor and Nick almost automatically fell in love and married each other. Nick and Taylor decide to have a child but her eggs are not viable; so she needed a donor. Soon after the birth, it was revealed the baby's donor (due to a mix up) was Brooke. Taylor had difficulty being in a family with Nick and Brooke's biological baby, Jack. Taylor begins drinking again, they divorce and shared joint custody. Taylor later handed the baby over to Brooke. Nick and Bridget give their relationship another chance. They get married for the second time in July 2008. Later, Bridget's aunt, Katie Logan, undergoes heart issues after being shot by Storm Logan. During this difficult time, Nick and Katie had sex resulting in a pregnancy. Nick left briefly for business. Bridget and Nick once again re-connect in 2009 (months after their divorce) and remarry. They decide to have a baby via surrogate, who is a lady named Aggie. After Aggie and Bridget get into another verbal altercation, Aggie falls down and collapses, losing the baby.

Aggie developed feelings for Nick herself. Bridget later falls pregnant after a one-night stand with Owen Knight. Nick and Bridget divorce and he begins a flirtation with Aggie which later ended after Nick was diagnosed with cancer, but was later revealed to be in good health. Nick resurfaces as he helps Taylor in the Forrester family dilemma when the Forrester jet crashes into the Atlantic Ocean carrying Brooke and Thomas. He helps Ridge to find his family. Nick later receives an anonymous message from a woman asking to meet him in the Jackie M steam room, and is shocked when he discovers that it is Stephanie's sister, Pamela Douglas. Pam informs him that Stephen Logan left her and confesses to finding Nick increasingly attractive, but Nick initially rejects her advances. Meanwhile, Jackie M is facing a tough situation. After firing Amber Moore for stealing Forrester designs, Jackie begins to worry as they do not have a designer. Jackie subsequently convinces Nick to spend some time with Pam in return for her stealing designs from Eric. Nick then begins a relationship with Donna, after she splits up with her husband, Justin Barber. However, she soon finds out about Nick and Pam's scheme and breaks up with him.

Nick returns to LA in June 2025 and immediately meets Brooke. It's revealed that Nick has been living around the world and is now running Marone Industries out of Naples, Italy. Nick has been unable to get over Brooke and after 15 years has returned to rekindle their relationship.

== Oscar Marone ==
Oscar Marone was played by Brian Gaskill from September 2003 through August 2004. Gaskill was hired after the ABC Daytime soap opera Port Charles was cancelled, where he played Rafe Kovich. In 2003, Gaskill described Oscar as the black sheep of the family, "He's not necessarily a bad guy, but he's not all good, either. He might seem kind of cold sometimes, but I think his heart's in the right place. To be honest I'm not 100 percent sure who he is until I've played him a while. Brad Bell (executive producer) keeps things pretty close. You never know where this guy might end up."

== Caitlin Ramirez ==
Caitlin Ramirez was played by Kayla Ewell from January 22, 2004, through 2005. Caitlin had relationships with Rick Forrester (Justin Torkildsen) and Thomas Forrester (Drew Tyler Bell).

Caitlin was the daughter of Hector Ramirez and Samantha Kelly. After her romances she joined her mother and moved to New York in 2005.

== Hector Ramirez ==
Hector Ramirez was portrayed by Lorenzo Lamas from 2004 to 2006.

In 2021, Richard Simms from Soaps She Knows put Hector on his list of the most hated soap opera characters, commenting that "As often happens with have-nots on Bold & Beautiful, this firefighter's story went up in smoke relatively quickly."

== Jarrett Maxwell ==
Jarrett Maxwell was played by Andrew Collins from July 27, 2004, to 2018. Jarrett a fashion reporter for Eye on Fashion and an employee of Spencer Publications. Jarrett is an established member of the fashion industry reporting on the latest fashion lines of Forrester Creations and is very friendly with the Forrester family. Jarrett is also friendly with his superiors Bill Spencer Jr. and Karen Spencer, and was one of the very few people to know Karen was gay before she came out publicly.

== Priscilla Kelly ==
Priscilla Kelly was played by from 2004 to 2005 by Linda Gray. She was introduced as the controlling mother of Samantha Kelly. Richard Simms from Soaps She Knows called her a "manipulative mom" who had an "incredibly short shelf [life]".

== Dante Damiano ==
Dante Damiano was played by Antonio Sabàto Jr. from 2005 through 2006. He fathered a child with Felicia Forrester (Lesli Kay), and was in a relationship with her half-sister, Bridget Forrester (Ashley Jones). Bridget has a miscarriage and Dante leaves for a job in Italy.

== Gabriela Moreno ==
Gabriela Moreno is the daughter of Stephanie Forrester's maid, Helen. Shanelle Workman originated the role on March 24, 2005. Gabriela has a green card marriage with Thomas Forrester. Workman was let go of her contract later that year, last appearing on October 27, 2005.

== Ann Douglas ==
Ann Douglas is the mother of Stephanie Forrester and Pamela Douglas. Betty White originated the role during a ten-day run spanning December 2006 through January 2007, later returning in 2008 and 2009. Stephanie and Ann had been estranged since Stephanie was abused by her father and Ann did nothing to stop it. White described her character's entrance, "Ann has spent 30 years denying any of this (her daughter's abuse) had anything to do with her. She has to face some deep truths. It was quite dramatic, which is a switch for me. The most dramatic work I had done was some Ellery Queen. It was a delightful exercise to dig a little deeper and see where it took me." The child abuse story arc was one of many that won the series critical acclaim for handling social issues. White reprised the role in November 2009 when Ann returns to make amends with her family before she dies. White made television history by leading an all-female cast.

== Harry Jackson ==
Harry Jackson was played by Ben Hogestyn in 2006. Harry debuted on August 28, 2006.In December 2006, Hogestyn was dropped to recurring status and did not appear since. Harry arrives looking for Nick Marone (Jack Wagner) to confront him about his father's death, and he later hires Harry to work for him. Harry meets Nick's niece Phoebe Forrester (Mackenzie Mauzy), who is being blackmailed by Shane McGrath (Dax Griffin) into dating him. The two men fight and when Shane leaves town, Harry follows him and leaves too.

== Christian Ramirez ==
Christian Ramirez is the brother of Hector Ramirez (Lorenzo Lamas) and was played by Mario Lopez in 2006. Upon assuming the role, Lopez stated, "As someone who is part of the Latin community, I am very proud to play a character like Christian Ramirez because he's more than a role; he's a positive role model for people to look up to. He's a good man who wants to do good things. And he's strong. He proved that you can overcome anything to be the person you want to be."

== Shane McGrath ==
Shane McGrath was originated by Dax Griffin on September 12, 2006. The character is killed off in 2007, originally thought to be shot by Nick Marone but was shot by Ridge Forrester.

In 2021, Richard Simms from Soaps She Knows put Shane on his list of the most hated soap opera characters, commenting that "For some reason, Bold & Beautiful fans didn't want to see Phoebe Forrester hook up with an unemployed, homeless dude who hoped to blackmail her mom with the knowledge that she'd run down Darla Forrester. Six months later, he died of a self-inflicted gunshot wound following a struggle for the weapon with Ridge Forrester (then Ronn Moss)."

== Carl Ferret ==
Carl Ferret, played by Sean Whalen, initially appeared between 2007 and 2011. On March 30, 2024, it was announced that Whalen would reprise the role beginning April 5 of that year. One of Carl's storylines revolved around his "massive" crush on Bridget Forrester (Ashley Jones).

Charlie Mason from Soaps She Knows called Carl as his "Favorite Nerd" and referred to him as "the hospital janitor who always seems to know a whole lot more than the best way to mop up a blood spill!"

== Constantine Parros ==
Constantine Parros was played by Constantine Maroulis in 2007, first appearing on March 15. Maroulis was the sixth-place finalist on the fourth season of the reality television series American Idol. Speaking of his casting, Maroulis stated, "I think they wanted to gear the audience a little younger this summer and sort of shake things up a bit." When asked by Entertainment Weekly if his character would show the "staple Constantine stare," he replied, "Definitely. It might have been written into one of the stage directions. The script said, 'Constantine gives her 'the look." I laughed out loud, of course." Maroulis also used the opportunity to promote his upcoming album, Constantine. He performed "Everybody Loves, Everybody Cries" and "A Girl Like You" on the series.

Constantine Parros is a music producer and former international rock star. He becomes infatuated with Phoebe Forrester (MacKenzie Mauzy) and pursues producing her record. In August 2007 he participates in the Boldface Challenge concert. The series conducted an online poll where fans voted between a performance from Constantine and Phoebe, and one from Phoebe and Rick Forrester (then-Kyle Lowder). During the concert, Constantine is joined by Elliott Yamin, third runner up in season five of American Idol, and singer-songwriter Jon McLaughlin. Each sing real-life singles; Yamin performs "Wait For You," McLaughlin performs "Beautiful Disaster" and Maroulis performs "Fading Into You".

== Owen Knight ==
Owen Knight
- The Bold and the Beautiful character
- Portrayed by: Brandon Beemer
- Duration: 2008–12
- First appearance: Episode 5346; July 2, 2008
- Last appearance: Episode 6271; February 29, 2012
- Created by: Bradley Bell & Kay Alden
In-universe information
- Occupation: Assistant; Businessperson; Model; Paralegal; Private detective; Restaurant worker
- Brothers: Casper Knight
- Wife: Jackie Marone (2009–present)
- Sons: Logan Knight

Owen Knight is a fictional character from the American CBS soap opera The Bold and the Beautiful. Created by Bradley Bell and Kay Alden, Owen was portrayed by Brandon Beemer and made his debut on July 2, 2008. Beemer was dropped to recurring status in January 2012, but continued to appear up until February 29, 2012, when he left the show altogether.

Owen Knight arrives in Los Angeles in July 2008 to see a client of his, Marcus Walton. Marcus hired him from a want ad online to find his biological mother. Marcus doesn't really know Owen since most of their correspondence have been online. Owen meets Donna Forrester and is instantly attracted to her. Donna's stepdaughter Felicia Forrester (Lesli Kay) notices this and offers Owen $200,000 to seduce Donna in an attempt to get Stephanie Forrester (her mother) and Eric Forrester (her father) back together. He appears to be intrigued by the offer and tells her he'll think about it. However, after meeting Donna he becomes enamored by her love and devotion to Eric and comes back and rejects the deal. Felicia is outraged and outraged even more when Owen tells Donna what Felicia did. In response to this new information, Donna fires Felicia, Thorne and Ridge Forrester since she didn't believe she could trust them while her husband was in a coma. Felicia was outraged by Owen and slapped him for telling Donna her plan. The Forresters therefore, decide to make it their goal to get Donna out of their father's life once their father comes out of the coma. Owen was made Donna's assistant (detective and paralegal background), due to his growing admiration of her; and he encourages her to keep Ridge, Felicia and Thorne out of the company since she can't trust them. He works as a voice of reason to her. Owen is shown to be a dissembler, causing friction among the Logans and Forresters due to his influence over Donna. Despite their collaboration to find his mother, Marcus is starting to question Owen's motives in regards to his mother. He believes Owen is manipulating Donna and confronts his mother. Donna listens to her son and begins to question Owen. Donna starts to become suspicious of Owen also since he seems too good to be true and becomes concerned when he tells her he loves her. She and he share a few kisses and she decides that it's best if she lets him go. He agrees and leaves the company but doesn't leave Los Angeles.

It was later discovered that Eric didn't have a heart attack, but he had been poisoned with potassium chloride which had been put in a bottle of gin that Eric had a drink from before he had sex with his wife. Thanks to some detective work by step-siblings Marcus and Bridget, the truth came out, and it could well be Owen whom the suspicion could fall on. On August 22, Owen was arrested for attempting to murder Eric Forrester. He was almost the target of attack by Ridge and Thorne, and even Donna was angry with his actions. However, he insisted that he was taking the blame for someone else, that person being Donna, who was on the verge of being arrested until he lied and said he poisoned Eric Forrester. His suspicions were indeed correct when it was discovered that Donna's arch-enemy, Pamela Douglas (Alley Mills), was the one who accidentally poisoned Eric (in an attempt to stop the lovemaking between Eric and Donna; thinking this would lead to Eric returning to her sister Stephanie) and then saved her when she tried to kill her with a shotgun and a bear. Donna became more enamored by Owen's knight saving act and they commenced to kiss as Eric Forrester was awaking slowly from his coma. Stephanie and Ridge send Donna and Owen both on a trip after Stephanie catches Donna and Owen in the bedroom kissing. However, they haven't been officially intimate in spite of the appearance. Recently Donna and Owen returned from their business trip unaware that a recovered Eric is down the hall from Kristen's old bedroom. Owen commences to kiss Donna and get her to try to move on with her life without Eric. Eric hears noise and catches them kissing each other.

In light of Eric's recovery Donna tells Owen that she can't be with him because she loves her husband. He refuses to leave and tells Donna that he loves her. He grabs her into a passionate kiss to which she responds. Owen continues to be an ambiguous thorn in Donna's side. She loves her husband but Owen captivates her passions. After discovering that Owen attempted to sleep with Donna her aunt, Bridget Forrester walks over and throws a glass of wine in Owen's face. And then walks away to eat a salad while sitting outside at a restaurant. Owen confronts her and tells her that he really does love Donna and Bridget breaks out into a tirade about men not being able to keep it in their pants to which Owen replies okay, "She can be down on men." And "he can be down on women." He continues to flirt with her.

Later Stephanie confronts him at a restaurant and wants him to tell her that he had an affair with Donna to which he denies stating that it's not as if he didn't try hard enough, but that she really does love Eric. Donna catches this and assumes Stephanie and Owen plotted the seduction attempt. And she relays to him that she "never wants to see him again." Owen tries to attract Bridget, but nothing comes of that; however, he, along with Marcus and Pam Douglas, confront Rick on his attraction to Steffy. Owen, Pam and Marcus don't trust Rick, as they think he had a hand in her sister, Phoebe's death, and they, like her father, Ridge, want to protect Steffy.

Having been fired from Forrester Creations, Owen got a job at Jackie M Designs. He started a fling with Jacqueline Marone. He also was dating Bridget, but this was short-lived since Bridget was still harboring feelings for her ex-husband Nick Marone and got back together with him. Jackie and Owen also got together, much to the irritation of Nick, who was convinced that Owen was only interested in Jackie for her money. Nick tried his best to break Owen and Jackie up, and even managed to convince Jackie to fire Owen. However, Owen countered with a proposal of marriage, which freaked Nick out even more. Nick vowed never to let Jackie marry Owen. Eventually, Owen took Jackie on a surprise vacation in Hawaii, unaware that Nick and Bridget were honeymooning there. Owen planned a wedding for Jackie, but Bridget found out about it and told Nick. Nick tried to stop the wedding, but he arrived too late.

Later, Bridget and Owen have a one-night stand after she loses her and Nick's baby. Owen gets Bridget pregnant, but while Bridget is aware of this, she chooses to keep it a secret until Aggie Jones finds out, forcing her to tell the truth. Nick subsequently divorces her.

Bridget and Owen's baby was born in October 2010. Bridget confessed that she had fallen in love with Owen and wanted to start a family with him. Although Owen appreciated her honesty, he stayed true to his wife and again proclaimed his love for her, leaving Bridget heartbroken. Nick eventually fires both Bridget and Owen from Jackie M Designs, although he later hires Owen back.

Jackie eventually ended the marriage, realizing that Owen belonged with his family and sorrowfully asking him for a divorce. Owen asked Bridget to move in with him, but their relationship ended in February 2012, allowing Owen to return to his marriage with Jackie. Jackie and Owen later sold their house and moved to New York to be with Bridget and Logan.

== Casper Knight ==
Owen Knight's twin brother, who appeared in three episodes in 2009, was portrayed by Brandon Beemer.

== Janet Webber ==
Janet Webber
- The Bold and the Beautiful character
- Portrayed by: Robin Mattson (2003); Kimberlin Brown (2005–2024)
- Duration: 2003; 2005–2006; 2024
- First appearance: September 29, 2003
- Last appearance: February 26, 2024
- Created by: Bradley Bell
- Introduced by: Bradley Bell (2003); John F. Smith (2005); Bradley Bell and Michael Minnis (2024)
- Crossover appearances: The Young and the Restless
In-universe information
- Other names: Sugar; Sheila Carter
- Occupation: Prison warden

Janet Webber, better known as 'Sugar', was a warden who aided Sheila Carter's escape from prison in 2003. She first appeared in Puerto Vista after Sheila had Ridge Forrester kidnapped.

After Sheila and Sugar escaped the foundry incident which saw Ridge presumed killed, they turn up in 2005 in Genoa City on B&B's sister soap The Young and the Restless. Now portrayed by Kimberlin Brown (who also portrays Shiela), Sugar has had plastic surgery to look identical to her offsider and commits further crimes.

Sugar was locked up in 2006 and presumably remained behind bars until 2024, when she escaped, kidnapped and shackled Sheila in an abandoned warehouse, ultimately aiming to frame her one-time accomplice for the murder of Steffy Forrester. The plan backfired - Sugar was killed when Steffy retaliated in self-defence, plunging a knife into her chest. Due to their identical looks, the Forrester family presumed Steffy had killed Sheila, but were stunned in the weeks that followed to realise that Sheila was alive and it was indeed Sugar who Steffy had stabbed to death.
