= Rick Forrester =

- The Bold and the Beautiful character
- Jacob Young as Rick Forrester
- Portrayed by: Jacob Young (1997–1999, 2011–2018); Justin Torkildsen (1999–2006); Kyle Lowder (2007–2011); (and child actors)
- Duration: 1990–2018
- First appearance: November 7, 1990
- Last appearance: May 29, 2018
- Created by: William J. Bell
- Introduced by: William J. Bell and Lee Phillip Bell (1990, 1995); Bradley Bell (1997, 1999, 2007, 2011); Jill Farren Phelps (2014)
- Book appearances: Second Chances (2014); Heart's Desire (2014); Blindsided By Love (2014)
- Crossover appearances: The Young and the Restless
- Justin Torkildsen as Rick Forrester
In-universe information
- Other names: Eric Forrester, Jr.
- Occupation: Businessman
- Family: Forrester; Logan
- Father: Eric Forrester
- Mother: Brooke Logan
- Stepfather: Ridge Forrester
- Sisters: Bridget Forrester
- Half-brothers: Ridge Forrester (legal); Thorne Forrester; R.J. Forrester; Jack Marone; Marcus Forrester (adoptive)
- Half-sisters: Angela Forrester; Kristen Forrester; Felicia Forrester; Hope Logan
- Wife: Amber Moore (1999–2000, 2001–2003); Caroline Spencer (2013–2015); Maya Avant (2015–2018)
- Sons: Eric Forrester III
- Daughters: Lizzy Forrester
- Grandfathers: Stephen Logan
- Grandmothers: Beth Logan
- Uncles: John Forrester; Storm Logan
- Aunts: Donna Logan; Katie Logan
- Nephews: Thomas Forrester (legal); Zende Forrester Dominguez (adoptive); Dino Damiano; Logan Knight
- Nieces: Phoebe Forrester (legal); Steffy Forrester (legal); Alexandria Forrester; Nicole Marone; Beth Spencer; Rosie Forrester (adoptive)
- First cousins: Jessica Forrester; Ivy Forrester; Marcus Forrester; Will Spencer; Flo Fulton

Rick Forrester is a fictional character from The Bold and the Beautiful, an American soap opera on the CBS network. He was born in 1990 as the son of Brooke Logan and Eric Forrester. Portrayed by several adult actors, he is currently portrayed by Jacob Young, who took claim of the role from 1997 to 1999, and returned from 2011 to 2018.

Rick is known for his extreme jealous obsession of Ridge Forrester, Ridge's relationship with Eric and heir apparent position at Forrester Creations. He has been known to manipulate those close to his life, and also for seducing Ridge's daughters Phoebe and Steffy Forrester, then seducing their mother and Ridge's ex-wife, Dr. Taylor Hayes, in a twisted revenge plot against Ridge.

== Casting ==
The role was originated by child actor Jeremy Snider, who remained in the role from 1991 to January 1995. The character was aged to a teen with Steve Hartman playing the role on a recurring basis from December 1995 to December 1997. Jacob Young took over the role and made his first appearance on December 31, 1997. Young later decided to leave the role and last appeared on September 15, 1999. For his portrayal of Rick, he received a Daytime Emmy nomination In 1999 for Outstanding Younger Actor in a Drama Series.

Following Young's departure, the role was recast with then-unknown actor Justin Torkildsen, who played the role from Fall 1999 to November 2006. In December 2006, it was announced that former star of the NBC Daytime series Days of Our Lives, actor Kyle Lowder, known for his five-year portrayal of Brady Black, would join the cast in January 2007. Lowder remained with the series until in January 2011 when it was announced that Lowder and executive producer Bradley Bell had reached a mutual decision to write the character off due to lack of storyline and creative direction.

In September 2011, it was announced Young would reprise the role of Rick twelve years after departing the role. Since departing the series, Young went on to portray Lucky Spencer on ABC's General Hospital, and became most recognized as JR Chandler on All My Children, until the serial's end in September 2011. Young first began airing on September 26, 2011. When asked about how his return happened, Young stated:

Brad [Bell, executive producer/head writer] contacted my manager and basically asked him if I would be interested in coming back and [said] that the character of Rick Forrester hadn't been the same since I left. He basically put it out there and that's how it started. My manager called me, we talked about it a bit and just kind of threw around some possibilities. They seemed excited. There have been times where some people from the production staff over there kind of dropped hints over the years, but I was very happy playing JR and being on ALL MY CHILDREN and living in New York and I really wasn't prepared to make that change. But now that there's uncertainty and change happening, it was pretty easy for me to be able to make that choice.

Though originally intended to be a 13-week engagement, Young agreed to extend his stay. He further confirmed in interviews that he did not go onto the planned online version of All My Children due to the insecurity it could potentially have job-wise, something he would not have with his return to The Bold and the Beautiful.

Following the departure of original cast member Ronn Moss, it was announced that Rick would become the new focal point of the series, becoming the so-called "new Ridge".

In February 2014, a big spring fashion show storyline for The Young and the Restless was announced to air April 11 to 16, 2014. The storyline included a crossover event between The Bold and the Beautiful and The Young and the Restless that involved Young’s character along with the character of Caroline Spencer played by Linsey Godfrey. Young’s appearance on The Young and the Restless was April 14, 2014.

In April 2018, Young announced he had been dropped to recurring capacity, which he called a "blessing." He last appeared on May 29, 2018.

== Storylines ==
=== 1990–2006 ===
Rick was born to Brooke Logan and Eric Forrester in 1990. He had a troubled childhood. He was bullied in school and suffered issues because of Brooke's relationship with Ridge Forrester (who he despised throughout his whole life). Rick's sister, Bridget Forrester was born a short time after him. Like her, he ran away from home on occasion.

When Rick's mother became engaged to a man named Grant Chambers, he was extremely unhappy. He shot Grant, but due to being disturbed by the event, he psychologically blocked out the memory. Ridge was initially jailed for the crime, although years later the truth was eventually revealed. When he was a young teen, Brooke hired a babysitter for Bridget and Rick (then played by Jacob Young), named Amber Moore (Adrienne Frantz). They had an affair, and married when Amber became pregnant. Her baby (Eric Forrester III) was stillborn, and it was unknown if Rick or a black man (whom Amber also slept with) named Raymond was the father. However, Amber tried to pass off her cousin's baby as Rick's. Eventually her lying was exposed and Rick left her. He later competed with C.J. Garrison for Amber (and Little Eric, the name she had given Becky's child who was her legal child)'s affection. He also stopped Amber and C.J from being married. Amber again later revealed she was pregnant again.

Rick also became close to a girl named Erica, later revealed to be the daughter of his former stepmother Sheila Carter, however Erica (having a bigger crush on him) never got to pursue a relationship with him, angering her mother. Erica was Little Eric's nanny for a short amount of time. She did attempt to seduce him though, however was unsuccessful as Rick was too focused on the pregnant Amber. In later years (after leaving Amber) he had a failed relationship with Caitlin Ramirez. In 2006, he left Los Angeles for Forrester Creations business.

=== 2007–2011 ===
Upon returning, Rick began dating Ridge's daughter Phoebe Forrester. When Phoebe refused to have sex with him, Rick cheated on her with his former lover Ashley Abbott, leading him and Phoebe to break up. Rick then seduced and began a relationship with Ridge's ex-wife and Phoebe's mother, Dr Taylor Hayes. When Taylor dumped him because of her unresolved feelings for Ridge, he started a fight and fell off a building and faked being paralyzed to gain sympathy and have his mother kick Ridge out of the house. In December 2008, Rick and Phoebe are in a car accident on the way to Ridge and Brooke's rehearsal dinner, and Phoebe dies. After Phoebe's death, Rick began seeing her sister Steffy Forrester at the same time he was being stalked by her brother Thomas Forrester. Steffy left him when it was revealed that he had only been with Phoebe, Taylor and Steffy to get back at Ridge, in a twisted revenge plot based on harboring a lifetime of resentment against Ridge. Rick then faded to the background, spending a lot of time in Paris. Rick soon became intrigued by Jacqueline Payne Marone, and tried to woo her away from her husband, Owen Knight, even going so far as to propose, but Jackie remained true to her husband.

=== 2011–2018 ===
After spending extensive time in Paris, Rick moved back to Los Angeles in the fall of 2011 and immediately took a disliking of his sister Hope's fiancé, Liam Spencer, whose marriage to Steffy Forrester recently ended. Rick then finds himself the object of ex-wife Amber Moore's affections and quickly resumes his relationship with her after she feeds him designs for a new Forrester line to label as his own. Brooke later hires a new designer, Caroline Spencer, to work with Rick. When Amber finds out, she becomes unnerved by the hiring and out of fear and jealousy, does everything she can to make sure Rick and Caroline do not become involved, in a professional or personal capacity. As part of her scheme, she begins to set it up to appear to Caroline that Rick is a cross dresser. When Caroline confides in Hope about her suspicions concerning Rick, Hope suspects that Amber may have something to do with it. When Rick realizes what Amber has done, he breaks off their relationship and makes it known to Caroline that he does not cross dress, putting Caroline's mind at ease.

Ridge names Thomas interim CEO of Forrester Creations, instead of Rick, and Caroline begins to side with Rick against Thomas. Rick falls out of a window and accuses Thomas of pushing him and Caroline breaks up with Thomas. Rick taunts Thomas over Caroline dating him instead of Thomas and Thomas retaliates by using his position as interim CEO to work closely with Caroline and reassigns Rick to work with Hope on her Hope For the Future Line. Thomas comes up with a new plan to attract new and younger customers to Forrester Creations but Rick disagrees while Caroline likes Thomas' ideas and Thomas agrees to donate some of the profits from the new line to Caroline's cancer research foundation. Caroline's feelings for Thomas resurface and they kiss. Hope sees the kiss and tells Caroline not to use her past relationship and feelings for Thomas in order to get ahead in the company. When Thomas' grandmother Stephanie Forrester dies and in a recorded DVD reveals that a legal loophole allowed her to change her will and give her 25% of Forrester Creations she put in an irrevocable trust for Thomas to Eric instead. This makes Eric CEO and ends Thomas and Steffy's plan to take majority control of Forrester Creations and Eric announces a fashion showdown between Rick, Caroline, and Hope and Thomas and Steffy and the winner will be Eric's protege.

Rick, wanting to score points with Caroline, reveals that he had his friend Othello, a DJ at a local nightclub, lie to Hope and say that Liam and Steffy were making out the night before his second wedding to Hope. A stunned Caroline tells Rick that everything she heard about him being manipulative and wanting to break up Thomas and Caroline is true, but Rick convinces her that he was only looking out for Hope. Caroline hears her uncle Bill Spencer, Jr. and Katie talking about Bill getting Hope's father Deacon Sharpe out of prison and secretly flying him to Italy to break up Hope and Liam's wedding. Caroline tells Rick, and they agree to talk to Brooke and Bill before they tell Hope the truth. Bill doesn't want Caroline and Rick to reveal anything and thinks Rick is only coming clean about his lies and deception in order to impress Caroline. Rick, with Caroline's support, reveals the truth to Hope, and she immediately is furious at her brother and tells Liam what she has learned. Rick and Thomas face off on the catwalk and the winners, chosen by Eric, are Rick, Hope, and Caroline. Eric then names Rick as the new president of Forrester Creations, making Thomas furious.

Eric is angry that Rick is not helping at Dayzee's so Rick starts volunteering at Dayzee's where he meets Maya Avant, an aspiring actress with whom he feels a strong connection. Rick then starts spending most of his time at Dayzee's with Maya. When Caroline finds out about him being at Dayzee's, she feels rejected by Rick. This leads to Rick spending more time with Maya, who has no idea who he is. Rick takes Maya to a Forrester Creations boutique on Rodeo Drive where an employee recognizes him and Maya hears her call him "Mr. Forrester". Rick reveals that he is a Forrester and Maya is furious that Rick lied about his identity to her. The first quarter numbers come in at this time and they are terrible due to Rick's ideas. Thomas uses this to convince Eric to support Thomas' idea of going into new trends but during his presentation Brooke comes out in her lingerie and convinces Eric to relaunch the highly successful Brooke's Bedroom, which he approves of. On the personal front, Rick apologizes to Maya for deceiving her, and they decide to give their relationship another try, focusing on the present and not looking back at the past. They then take it to another level when they share a kiss. On the professional side of things, when Rick notices that Hope For The Future is in need of a new spokeswoman, he suggests Maya for the position, which she accepts. Rick then leaves Caroline for Maya, but they break up soon after. Caroline and Rick reconcile and they get married. Maya then sees Caroline and Ridge share a kiss. Rick leaves Caroline and starts seeing Maya again. After that, he and Maya go on living at Forrester's mansion, making Aly and Ivy's lives impossible for have being on Caroline's side. After all, Rick has also some feelings for Caroline that, while she was in her office sharing a kiss with Ridge, Rick, taken by a crazy action, shoots them.

Rick later marries Maya and later welcomed their daughter, Elizabeth "Lizzy" Forrester born via surrogacy thanks to Maya's younger sister, Nicole Avant. In 2018, Rick later leaves town with Maya and Lizzy and the three of them move to Paris.

== Reception ==
For his portrayal of Rick, Young was nominated for Outstanding Supporting Actor in a Drama Series at the 42nd Daytime Emmy Awards. In November 2003, whilst discussing the current storylines and characters of The Bold and the Beautiful, Nancy M. Reichardt from the Edmonton Journal opined that Bridget and Rick had "been placed in melodramatic stories that do not play well". In 2022, Charlie Mason from Soaps She Knows placed Rick 12th on his ranked list of The Bold and the Beautiful’s Best of the Best Characters Ever, commenting "A portrait of ambition, Eric and Brooke’s son has always had his eye on the prize. Trouble is, that eye, as focused by Jacob Young, Justin Torkildsen and Kyle Lowder, has wandered to one wife/girlfriend after another after another."
