= Kyle Lowder =

American actor and journalist (born 1980)

- Born: Kyle Brandon Lowder; August 27, 1980 (age 46); St. Louis, Missouri, U.S.
- Occupations: Actor, broadcast journalist
- Years active: 2000–present
- Known for: Performance in daytime television
- Notable work: Brady Black on Days of Our Lives; Rick Forrester on The Bold and the Beautiful
- Television: KTVN (2023–2026); Newsmax (since 2026)
- Spouse: Arianne Zucker (m. 2002; div. 2014)
- Children: 1

Kyle Brandon Lowder (born August 27, 1980) is an actor and broadcast journalist. He began his career in 2000 when he was cast as Brady Black on the NBC soap opera Days of Our Lives; he remained with the soap until 2005. He went on to portray the role of Rick Forrester on The Bold and the Beautiful from 2007 to 2011, and returned to Days of Our Lives as Rex Brady from 2018 to 2025. In 2023, Lowder transitioned his career into broadcast journalism, joining KTVN; he remained with the network until 2026, when he joined Newsmax as a co-host of weekend edition of Wake Up America.

== Early life ==
He graduated from Pleasantville High School in Pleasantville, New York in 1998.

== Career ==
In August 2000, Lowder was cast in the aged role of Brady Black on the NBC soap opera, Days of Our Lives. In 2003, Lowder guest-starred as himself during the ninth season of Friends. That same year, he received a Daytime Emmy Award nomination for his work as Brady. In September 2005, it was announced that he would exit Days of Our Lives, following the soap's decision to not renew the actor's deal; he made his final appearance on September 15 of the same year.

In December 2006, it was announced that Lowder had joined the cast of The Bold and the Beautiful as Rick Forrester, succeeding actor Justin Torkildsen; he made his first appearance on January 25, 2007. In January 2011, he announced his exit from the soap, citing it a "mutual decision" between him and executive producer Brad Bell. That same year, Lowder joined the cast of the web soap DeVanity in its second season. In 2012, he appeared as Stacee Jax in Rock of Ages at The Venetian Las Vegas.

In May 2018, it was announced that Lowder would return to Days of Our Lives. He made his first appearance in the role of Rex Brady on October 19, 2018. He exited the role in August 2019. Lowder returned to the role in 2020 and left the show again in 2025.

On July 3, 2023, Lowder became anchor and reporter for CBS affiliate KTVN in Reno, Nevada. His final broadcast aired on March 13, 2026, and announced he would be relocating to New York City for a national news job. That April, he became co-host of Wake Up America Weekend on Newsmax.

== Personal life ==
On August 3, 2002, he married his Days of Our Lives co-star Arianne Zucker. In December 2009, they welcomed their first child, a daughter. In March 2014, it was announced that Lowder and Zucker had divorced.

== Filmography ==
- 2000–2005: Days of Our Lives as Brady Black (Role from: August 2000 - September 2005)
- 2003: Friends as himself in The One with the Soap Opera Party
- 2006: Cuts as Eric (1 episode)
- 2007–2011: The Bold and the Beautiful as Rick Forrester (Role: January 2007 — January 2011)
- 2012: "DeVanity" as Andrew Regis (3 episodes)
- 2018–2025: Days of Our Lives as Rex Brady
- 2020: The Amityville Harvest as Vincent Miller

Preceded by Justin Torkildsen	Ridge Forrester (role); 2007–11	Succeeded by Jacob Young
Preceded by Eric Winter	Rex Brady (role); 2018–23; 2025	Succeeded by None
