= Jacob Young =

American actor and producer (born 1979)

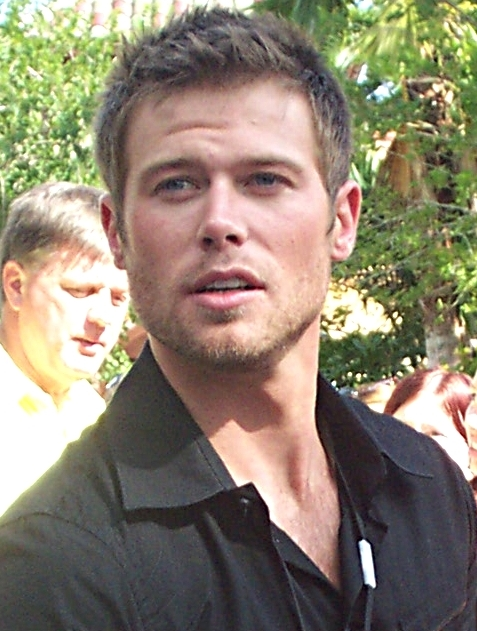
- Young at the 2005 ABC Super Soap Weekend
- Born: Jacob Wayne Young; September 10, 1979 (age 47); Renton, Washington, U.S.
- Other name: Jacob W. Young
- Occupations: Actor; Producer
- Years active: 1997–present
- Spouse: Christen Steward (m. 2007)
- Children: 3

Jacob Wayne Young (born September 10, 1979) is an American actor and producer. He is a five-time Daytime Emmy Award nominee, winning once in 2002 for his role as Lucky Spencer in the soap opera General Hospital (2000–2003). He is best known for his roles as Rick Forrester in the soap opera The Bold and the Beautiful (1997–1999, 2011–2018) and JR Chandler in the soap opera All My Children (2003–2011).

== Early life and career ==
Jacob Wayne Young was born in Renton, Washington, the youngest child of Rhonda and Michael Young, Sr. and was raised in Loveland, Colorado, and Roy, Washington, moving to San Diego, California at age seventeen with his mother. His parents divorced and his mother remarried to Edward Vasquez. He has one older brother and two sisters.

Young portrayed Rick Forrester on the CBS soap The Bold and the Beautiful from December 31, 1997, to September 15, 1999. He was nominated for a Daytime Emmy Award as Outstanding Younger Actor in a Drama Series in 1999. Young later portrayed Lucky Spencer on General Hospital for three years from February 25, 2000, until February 10, 2003. In 2001, he was named "Sexiest Soap Star" by People magazine. In 2002, he won a Daytime Emmy Award for Outstanding Younger Actor in a Drama Series for his role as Lucky Spencer on General Hospital

Young portrayed JR Chandler on All My Children from October 1, 2003, to September 23, 2011. In 2005, he was again nominated for a Daytime Emmy Award as Outstanding Younger Actor, and in 2009 he was nominated for Outstanding Supporting Actor in a Drama Series.

In September 2011, Young reprised his role as Rick on The Bold and the Beautiful. His first airdate was September 26. In April 2018, Young announced he had been dropped to recurring capacity, which he called a "blessing."

=== Other projects ===
On September 11, 2001, Artemis Records released Young's self-titled CD. In 2004, he guest-starred in the film The Girl Next Door. He additionally guest-starred on ABC's Hope & Faith and, from May 2006 through August 20, 2006, starred in Disney's Beauty and the Beast on Broadway, in the role of Lumiere.

== Personal life ==
In April 2006, Young and his longtime girlfriend, Christen Steward, a model, announced their engagement. They were married on May 13, 2007, at the Westmount Country Club in Woodland Park, New Jersey. The couple has three children.

== Filmography ==
Film
Year	Title	Role	Notes
2004	The Girl Next Door	Hunter	
2018	A Dog & Pony Show	Okie (voice)	
2019	Psycho Granny	Todd	
2022	Four For Fun	George	
2025	A Murder Between Friends	Josh	Also director

Television
Year	Title	Role	Notes
1997–1999, 2011–2018	The Bold and the Beautiful	Rick Forrester	Regular role
2000	The Beach Boys: An American Family	Dean Torrance	Episode:#1
2000–2003	General Hospital	Lucky Spencer	Series regular
2003–2011	All My Children	JR Chandler	839 episodes
2004	Hope & Faith	Heath Hamilton	2 episodes
2005	One Life to Live	JR Chandler	6 episodes
2012	Imaginary Friend	Dr. Kent	
2014	The Young and the Restless	Rick Forrester	Episode #10389
2018	Killer Vacation	Jake Johnson	Television film
2018	Christmas Made to Order	Jeff	Television film
2019	When Vows Break	Tolan	Television film
2019	The Road Home for Christmas	Mark	Television film
2020	Beacon Hill	JD Cooper	2 episodes
2020	yA	Brian Garrett-Nelson	pre-production
2021	High School Musical: The Musical: The Series	Cash Caswell	1 episode
2021	The Walking Dead	Deaver	Guest star

== Awards and nominations ==
List of acting awards and nominations
Year	Award	Category	Title	Result	Ref.
1999	Daytime Emmy Award	Outstanding Younger Actor in a Drama Series	The Bold and the Beautiful	Nominated	
2002	Daytime Emmy Award	Outstanding Younger Actor in a Drama Series	General Hospital	Won	
2005	Daytime Emmy Award	Outstanding Younger Actor in a Drama Series	All My Children	Nominated	
2009	Daytime Emmy Award	Outstanding Supporting Actor in a Drama Series	All My Children	Nominated	
2015	Daytime Emmy Award	Outstanding Supporting Actor in a Drama Series	The Bold and the Beautiful	Nominated	
2016	Daytime Emmy Award	Outstanding Supporting Actor in a Drama Series	The Bold and the Beautiful	Nominated	

== See also ==
- JR Chandler and Babe Carey

Preceded by Steven Hartman	Rick Forrester (role); 1998–99; 2011–18	Succeeded by Justin Torkildsen
Preceded by Kyle Lowder	Rick Forrester (role); 1998–99; 2011–18	None
Preceded by Jonathan Jackson	Lucky Spencer (role); 2000–03	Succeeded by Greg Vaughan
Preceded by Andrew Ridings	JR Chandler (role); 2003–11	Succeeded by Ryan Bittle
