= Justin Torkildsen =

American actor (born 1981)

- Born: July 3, 1981 (age 45); Boulder, Colorado, U.S.
- Occupation: Actor
- Years active: 1994–present
- Spouse: Bonnie Binion (m. 2001; div. 2008)

Justin Torkildsen (born July 3, 1981 in Boulder, Colorado) is an American actor, best known for his role as Rick Forrester on the daytime soap opera, The Bold and the Beautiful. He portrayed the role from 1999 to 2006.

Torkildsen received his first nomination in 2000 for his portrayal of Rick at the YoungStar Awards for "Best Young Actor/Performance in a Daytime TV Series". In 2001, he won a Daytime Emmy Award for "Outstanding Younger Actor in a Drama Series", and was consecutively nominated in the same category in 2002. He was also nominated at the Young Artist Awards in 2001 for "Best Performance in a Daytime TV Series - Young Actor". He was also nominated for a Soap Opera Digest Award for "Outstanding Younger Lead Actor" in 2003.

== Awards and nominations ==
Year	Award	Category	Work	Result	Ref.
2001	Daytime Emmy Award	Outstanding Younger Actor in a Drama Series	The Bold and the Beautiful	Won	
2002	Daytime Emmy Award	Outstanding Younger Actor in a Drama Series	The Bold and the Beautiful	Nominated	

Preceded by Jacob Young	Rick Forrester (role); 1999–2006	Succeeded by Kyle Lowder
