= List of The Bold and the Beautiful cast members =

The Bold and the Beautiful is an American television soap opera, created by William J. Bell and Lee Phillip Bell for CBS. Debuting on March 23, 1987, John McCook (Eric Forrester) and Katherine Kelly Lang (Brooke Logan) are the two longest-running cast members, each having appeared since the first episode. The following list is of cast members who are currently on the show: the main cast and recurring, or who are upcoming, returning or departing from the series.

== Current cast members ==
=== Main cast ===
Main cast members
Actor	Character	Duration	Ref.
Darin Brooks	Wyatt Spencer	2013–2024, 2026	
Kimberlin Brown	Sheila Carter	1992–1998, 2002–2003, 2017–2018, 2021–present	
Kimberlin Brown	Janet "Sugar" Webber	2024	
Rebecca Budig	Taylor Hayes	2024–present	
Sydney Bullock	Melissa Dylan	2025–present	
Scott Clifton	Liam Spencer	2010–present	
Harrison Cone	Deke Sharpe	2025–present	
Don Diamont	Brad Carlton	1993	
Don Diamont	Bill Spencer Jr.	2009–present	
Laneya Grace	Electra Forrester	2024–present	
Murielle Hilaire	Daphne Rose Walton	2025–present	
Sean Kanan	Deacon Sharpe	2000–2005, 2012, 2014–2017, 2021–present	
Thorsten Kaye	Ridge Forrester	2013–present	
Katherine Kelly Lang	Brooke Logan Forrester	1987–present	
John McCook	Eric Forrester	1987–present	
Crew Morrow	Will Spencer	2024–present	
Brayan Nicoletti	R.J. Forrester	2026	
Annika Noelle	Hope Logan Spencer	2018–present	
Tanner Novlan	John Finnegan	2020–present	
Lawrence Saint-Victor	Carter Walton	2013–present	
Heather Tom	Katie Logan Spencer	2007–present	
Christian Weissman	Remy Pryce	2024–present	
Jacqueline MacInnes Wood	Steffy Forrester Finnegan	2008–2013, 2015–present	

=== Recurring and guest cast ===
Recurring and guest cast members
Actor	Character	Duration	Ref.
Matthew Atkinson	Thomas Forrester	2019–present	
Jamison Belushi	April	2024–present	
Ashleigh Brewer	Ivy Forrester	2014–2018, 2024–present	
Dick Christie	Charlie Webber	2013–present	
Delon de Metz	Zende Forrester Dominguez	2020–present	
Jennifer Gareis	Donna Logan	2006–present	
Bryan David Garlick	Hayes Finnegan	2025–present	
Theodora Greece	Alison Montgomery	2011–2016, 2026	
Ashley Jones	Bridget Forrester	2004–2013, 2015–2016, 2018, 2020–present	
Ted King	Jack Finnegan	2021–present	
Dan Martin	Bradley Baker	1997–2018, 2021–present	
Naomi Matsuda	Li Finnegan	2021–present	
Sophia Paras McKinlay	Kelly Spencer	2022–present	
Alley Mills	Pamela Douglas	2006–2019, 2021–2022, 2024–present	
Romy Park	Poppy Nozawa	2023–present	
Denise Richards	Shauna Fulton	2019–2021, 2026	
Henry Joseph Samiri	Douglas Forrester	2019–present	
Aaron D. Spears	Justin Barber	2009–2022, 2024–present	
Kelly Sullivan	Darcy Dylan	2026	
Jack Wagner	Nick Marone	2003–2012, 2022, 2025–present	
Amy Yasbeck	Cassie	2025–present	

== Previous cast members ==
Previous cast members
Actor	Character	Duration	Ref.
Zane Achor	Will Spencer	2013–2018	
Marla Adams	Beth Logan	1990–1991	
Krista Allen	Shelley	1995	
Krista Allen	Taylor Hayes	2021–2023	
George Alvarez	Enrique Alvarez	1996–1997	
Luigi Amodeo	Lorenzo Barelli	2002–2003	
Tom Arnold	Captain Deuce Stevens	2024	
Obba Babatundé	Julius Avant	2015–2018, 2020	
Justin Baldoni	Graham Darros	2010	
Judith Baldwin	Beth Logan	1987	
Peter Barton	Scott Grainger	1993	
Bob Barker	Himself	2014	
Kiara Barnes	Zoe Buckingham	2018–2021	
Texas Battle	Marcus Forrester	2008–2013	
Orson Bean	Howard	2016	
Kabir Bedi	Prince Omar Rashid	1994–1995, 2005	
Brandon Beemer	Owen Knight	2008–2012	
Brandon Beemer	Casper Knight	2009	
Drew Tyler Bell	Thomas Forrester	2004–2010	
Lauralee Bell	Christine Blair	2007, 2024	
Paulo Benedeti	Antonio Dominguez	2001–2002, 2012–2013, 2017	
Fran Bennett	Judge Madeline Collins	1987	
Peter Bergman	Jack Abbott	1998	
Katrina Bowden	Flo Fulton	2019–2022	
Judith Borne	Deveney Dixon	1988–1989	
Wayne Brady	Reese Buckingham	2018–2019	
Eric Braeden	Victor Newman	1999	
Adain Bradley	Xander Avant	2018–2019, 2023	
Peter Brown	Blake Hayes	1991–1992	
Sarah Joy Brown	Aggie Jones	2009–2011	
Agnes Bruckner	Bridget Forrester	1997–1999	
Sabrina Bryan	Alisa Cordova	2002	
Ian Buchanan	James Warwick	1993–1999, 2004, 2007–2011, 2017	
Jim J. Bullock	Serge	2005, 2009	
Jim J. Bullock	Joseph Beasley	2026	
Nancy Burnett	Beth Logan	1987–1989, 1994, 1996–1998, 2000–2001	
Sarah G. Buxton	Morgan DeWitt	2000–2001, 2005	
Kurt Caceres	Ed De La Rosa	2016	
Ashley Lyn Cafagna	Kimberly Fairchild	1998–2001	
Mick Cain	C.J. Garrison	1997–2004, 2007, 2010, 2017	
Luca Calvani	Father Fontana	2012–2013	
John Castellanos	Jeff Talon	1987	
Judith Chapman	Gloria Abbott Bardwell	2014	
Crystal Chappell	Danielle Spencer	2012–2013	
Othello Clark	Othello	2011–2015, 2018	
Brian Patrick Clarke	Storm Logan	1990–1991	
Robert Clary	Pierre Jourdan	1990–1992	
Andrew Collins	Jarrett Maxwell	2004–19	
Darlene Conley	Sally Spectra	1989–2007	
Felisha Cooper	Sasha Thompson	2015–2017	
Jeanne Cooper	Katherine Chancellor	2005	
Mace Coronel	R.J. Forrester	2013–2014	
Matthew Cowles	Curtis Love	1997	
Barbara Crampton	Maggie Forrester	1995–1998	
Cassandra Creech	Grace Buckingham	2022	
Pat Crowley	Natalie Dewitt	2005	
Michael Damian	Danny Romalotti	2024	
Patrika Darbo	Shirley Spectra	2017–2018	
Henry Darrow	Carlos Nunez	1998–2001	
Eileen Davidson	Ashley Abbott	2007–2008	
Justiin Davis	Colin Colby	2023	
Lane Davies	Ridge Forrester	1992	
Tamara Davies	Tricia Quick	2002–2003	
Michelle Davison	Ruthanne Owens	1991–1993, 1995, 1997	
Jack De Mave	Cal Clinton	1987	
William deVry	Storm Logan	2006–2008, 2012	
Michael Dietz	Mark Maclaine	2002–2005	
Colleen Dion-Scotti	Felicia Forrester	1990–1992, 1997, 2004	
Kevin Dobson	Judge Devin Owens	2006–2007	
Ferry Doedens	Lars	2014	
Lesley-Anne Down	Jackie Marone	2003–2012	
Kevin Dobson	Devin Owens	2006–2007	
Patrick Dorn	Thomas Forrester	2002–2003	
Courtnee Draper	Mary Warwick	2002	
Patrick Duffy	Stephen Logan	2006–2011, 2022	
Reign Edwards	Nicole Avant	2015–2018	
Bobbie Eakes	Macy Alexander	1989–2003	
Andrea Evans	Tawny Moore	1999–2000, 2010–2011	
Kayla Ewell	Caitlin Ramirez	2004–2005	
Kayla Ewell	Steffy Forrester	2020–2021	
Morgan Fairchild	Dottie Bright	2009, 2026	
Sandra Ferguson	Brooke Logan	1997	
Cirie Fields	Dr. Martin	2023	
Jennifer Finnigan	Bridget Forrester	2000–2004	
Susan Flannery	Stephanie Forrester	1987–2012, 2018	
Rome Flynn	Zende Forrester Dominguez	2015–2017	
Pierson Fodé	Thomas Forrester	2015–2018	
Adrienne Frantz	Amber Moore	1997–2005, 2010–2012	
Adrienne Frantz	April Knight	2003	
John Gabriel	Lloyd Bennet	1991	
Brian Gaskill	Oscar Marone	2003–2004	
Bryan Genesse	Rocco Carner	1987–1989, 2009	
Finnegan George	Will Spencer	2018–19	
Frank and Morgan Gingerich	Jack Marone	2010–2011	
Linsey Godfrey	Caroline Spencer	2012–2018	
Ricky Paull Goldin	Jesse Graves	2013	
Charles Grant	Grant Chambers	1996–1998	
Adam Gregory	Thomas Forrester	2010–2014	
James Michael Gregary	Ken Fontan	1991	
Dax Griffin	Shane McGrath	2006–2007	
Courtney Grosbeck	Coco Spectra	2017–2018	
Jessica and Sarah Haas	Erica Lovejoy	1998	
Jacqueline Hahn	Dr Caspary	2005–2013, 2017	
Ken Hanes	Mike Guthrie	1993–1998, 2010, 2022–2023	
Emily Harrison	Bridget Forrester	2004	
Winsor Harmon	Thorne Forrester	1996–2016, 2022–2023	
Dennis Haskins	Mack	2010	
Rick Hearst	Whipple Jones	2002, 2009–2011	
Jon Hensley	Dr Meade	2012–2013	
Danube Hermosillo	Darlita	2017–2018	
Catherine Hickland	Brooke Logan	1987	
Joshua Hoffman	R.J. Forrester	2023–2024	
Ben Hogestyn	Harry Jackson	2006	
Addison Hoover	Phoebe Forrester	2005–2006	
Alex Hoover	Steffy Forrester	2005–2006	
Courtney Hope	Sally Spectra	2017–2020	
Jack Horan	R.J. Forrester	2011	
Anna Maria Horsford	Vivienne Avant	2015–2018	
Clint Howard	Tom	2024	
Rif Hutton	Stan Bentworth	1989	
Rif Hutton	Dr. Harrison	1992	
Rif Hutton	Dr. Sloan	1998	
Adam Huss	Patron	2002	
Mykel Shannon Jenkins	Charlie Baker	2007–2009, 2012	
Vincent Irizarry	Jordan Armstrong	2019	
Brent Jasmer	Sly Donovan	1992–1996	
Anthony Johnson	Caterer	1989	
Joanna Johnson	Caroline Spencer Forrester	1987–1990, 1992, 2001	
Joanna Johnson	Karen Spencer	1991–1994, 2009, 2011–2014	
Jökull Júlíusson	Himself	2024	
Kathryn Joosten	Herself	2011	
Lesli Kay	Felicia Forrester	2005–2014, 2016	
Hunter King	Summer Newman	2021	
Matt Klotz	James	2023	
Lauren Koslow	Margo Maclaine Lynley	1987–1992, 2002	
Kelly Kruger	Eva	2014–2017, 2020–2021	
Lorenzo Lamas	Hector Ramirez	2004–2006	
John Lawlor	Walter Talbert	1988–1989	
Teri Ann Linn	Kristen Forrester	1987–1990, 1992–1994	
Kristolyn Lloyd	Dayzee Leigh Forrester	2010–2013	
Joe LoCicero	Vincent Walker	2019–21	
Peg London	Sybil Webber	1998	
Mario Lopez	Christian Ramirez	2006	
Kyle Lowder	Rick Forrester	2007–2011	
Aaron Lustig	Tim Reid	2001	
Beth Maitland	Traci Abbott	2007	
Constantine Maroulis	Constantine Parros	2007	
Peter Marshall	Unknown role	1997	
A Martinez	Ramon Montgomery	2011–2012	
Ron Masak	Scott, Big Bear Caretaker	2015	
Joseph Mascolo	Massimo Marone	2001–2006	
Eddie Matos	Charlie Espinada	2001	
Robin Mattson	Sugar	2003	
Kim Matula	Hope Logan	2010–2016	
MacKenzie Mauzy	Phoebe Forrester	2006–2008	
Molly McCook	Margot	2010	
Todd McKee	Jake Maclaine	1990–1992, 2007–2013, 2015–2016, 2018–2019	
Daniel McVicar	Clarke Garrison	1987–1992, 1996–2009	
Eddie Mekka	Las Vegas Minister	2005	
Tracy Melchior	Kristen Forrester	2001–2009, 2012–2013, 2017	
Lilly Melgar	Claudia Cortez	1996–1997	
Achi Miller	Simon	2017–2019	
Carrie Mitchum	Donna Logan	1987–1991, 1994–1995, 2001	
Karla Mosley	Maya Avant	2013–2019	
Ronn Moss	Ridge Forrester	1987–2012	
Wolf Muser	Dr. Seifert	2008	
Dylan Neal	Dylan Shaw	1994–1996	
Myrna Niles	Hope Donnely	1989	
Myrna Niles	Mrs. Johnson	1992	
Barbara Niven	Brenda Dickerson	1996	
Clayton Norcross	Thorne Forrester	1987–1989	
Kate Orsini	Dr March	2015–2017	
Ashlyn Pearce	Aly Forrester	2013–2015	
Sydney Penny	Samantha Kelly	2003–2005	
Aaron Phypers	Ridge Forrester	2020	
Robert Pine	Stephen Logan	1988, 1994, 1996–1998, 2001	
Spencer Pratt	Himself	2025	
Spencer Pratt	Rich	2026	
Lindsay Price	Michael Lai	1995–1997	
Linda Purl	Lucy	2022	
Ingo Rademacher	Thorne Forrester	2017–2019	
Zach Rance	Zach	2014–2015	
Usher Raymond	Raymond	1999	
Ray Reinhardt	Dr. Marshall	1991	
Robin Riker	Beth Logan	2008–2010	
Victor Rivers	Ricardo Montemayor	2013–2014	
Chris Robinson	Jack Hamilton	1992–1994, 1996−2002, 2005	
Gina Rodriguez	Beverly	2011–2012	
Jane A. Rogers	Julie DeLorean	1990–1992	
Tristan Rogers	Hunter Jones	1997	
Monica Ruiz	Penny Escobar	2020	
Antonio Sabàto Jr.	Dante Damiano	2005–2006	
Antonio Sabàto Sr.	Aldo Damiano	2006	
Francisco San Martín	Mateo	2017	
Brad Sanders	Minister	2011	
Rodney Saulsberry	Anthony Wallace	2010–2013	
Rick Scarry	Doctor	2002	
Monika Schnarre	Ivana Vanderveld	1994–1995	
Christopher Sean	Waiter	2010	
Jacqueline Scott	Ruth Wilson	1987	
Melody Thomas Scott	Nikki Newman	2022	
Susan Seaforth Hayes	Joanna Manning	2003, 2005	
Shari Shattuck	Heather Thompson	1992	
Mary Sheldon	Donna Logan	2001	
Stephen Shortridge	Dave Reed	1987	
Taja V. Simpson	Adele	2012–2014	
Nia Sioux	Emma Barber	2018–2019	
Nancy Sloan	Katie Logan	1987–1989, 1991, 1994–1998, 2000−2001, 2003−2004	
Daniel E. Smith	Zende Forrester Domínguez	2001–02, 2005	
Hillary B. Smith	Stacy Barton	2012	
Rena Sofer	Quinn Fuller	2013–2022	
Kelly Stables	Beauty Salon Attendant	2008	
Austin Stoker	Mitchell Owens	1991–92	
Jim Storm	Bill Spencer, Sr.	1987–1994, 1997, 2000, 2003, 2009	
Michael Swan	Adam Alexander	1998–2003	
Marissa Tait	Becky Moore	1999–2000	
Russell Todd	Jerry Birn	1995	
Justin Torkildsen	Rick Forrester	1999–2006	
Jeff Trachta	Thorne Forrester	1989–1996	
Scott Turner Schofield	Nick	2015	
Anthony Turpel	R.J. Forrester	2016–2018	
Hunter Tylo	Taylor Hayes	1990–2002, 2004–2014, 2018–2019	
Michael Tylo	Sherman Gale	2000	
Jeremy Ray Valdez	Alex Sanchez	2018–2022	
Sandra Vergara	Theresa Corazon	2013	
Sandra Vidal	Sofia Alonso	2001–2003	
Lark Voorhies	Jasmine Malone	1995–1996	
Caitlin Wachs	Bridget Forrester	1995	
Stephanie Wang	Madison Lee	2007–2014	
Maitland Ward	Jessica Forrester	1994–1996	
Chris Warren Jr.	Jimmy Ramirez	2004–2005	
Ethan Wayne	Storm Logan	1987–1989, 1994, 1998, 2000−2001, 2003	
Dawn Wells	Alice	2016	
Sean Whalen	Carl Ferret	2007–2011	
Ellen Wheeler	Sarah	1995	
Betty White	Ann Douglas	2006–2009	
Diamond White	Paris Buckingham	2020–2024	
Fred Willard	John Forrester	2014–2015	
Ed Williams	Reverend Mulcahey	2006	
Nafessa Williams	Margo Ivey	2012	
Tonya Williams	Olivia Winters	2011	
Sherilyn Wolter	Taylor Hayes	1990	
Lesley Woods	Helen Logan	1987–1989, 2001	
Samantha Worden	Hayes Finnegan	2021	
Shanelle Workman	Gabriela Moreno	2005	
Alex Wyse	Saul Feinberg	2017–2018	
Lisa Yamada	Luna Nozawa	2023–2025	
Jacob Young	Rick Forrester	1997–1999, 2011–2018	
Andres Zuno	Rafael	2013	

== See also ==
- List of The Bold and the Beautiful characters
