= List of The Bold and the Beautiful characters =

This is a list of major characters that have appeared on the soap opera, The Bold and the Beautiful.

== A ==
Ashley Abbott
Eileen Davidson (2007–08)

The Young and the Restless character

Gloria Abbott Bardwell
Judith Chapman (2014)

The Young and the Restless character

Jack Abbott
Peter Bergman (1998)

The Young and the Restless character

Adam Alexander
Michael Swan (1998–2003)

Macy Alexander
Bobbie Eakes (1989–2003)

Sofia Alonso
Sandra Vidal (2001–03)

Enrique Alvarez
George Alvarez (1996–97)

Joan Anderson
Suzanne Lederer (1987)

Keith Anderson
Ken LaRon (1993)
Keith Jones (1993–95)

DeAnna Andrews
Allison M. Hoffarth (2009)

Thea Andrews
Thea Andrews (2013)

Herself

Carmen Arena
Gladise Jiminezy (2000–01)

Anthony Armando
Michael Sabatino (1993–95)

Airline Attendant
Yvonne Miranda (2003–04)

Morgue Attendant
Tamara Zook (2010)

Defense Attorney
Marc Segal (2000)

Alexander "Xander" Avant
Adain Bradley (2018–19)

Julius Avant
Obba Babatundé (2015–18, 2020)

Maya Avant
Karla Mosley (2013–19)

Nicole Avant
Reign Edwards (2015–18)

Vivienne Avant
Anna Maria Horsford (2015–18)

== B ==
Fred Bailey
Robert Frank Telfer (1988)

Doctor.

Bradley Baker
Dan Martin (1997–2018)

Police Lieutenant/Deputy Chief.

Charlie Baker
Mykel Shannon Jenkins (2007–09, 2012)

Police Detective.

Richard Baker
John Carter (1987)

Adam Banks
Rod Loomis (1991–92)

Earl Banks
Chip Heller (1997–2003)

Detective.

Roy Banks
Sandy Ward (1987)

Detective.

Emma Barber
Nia Sioux (2018–19)

Justin Barber
Aaron D. Spears (2009–22, 2024–)

Marcus Barber Forrester
Texas Battle (2008–13)

Olivia Barber
Tonya Lee Williams (2011)

Former The Young and the Restless character

Lorenzo Barelli
Luigi Amodeo (2002–03)

Charles Barnes
Don Ross (1987)

Stacy Barton
Hillary B. Smith (2012)

Doctor.

Dorothy Bascomb
Juanita Jennings (2007)

Travis Bayer
Erik Aude (1997)

Harold Benson
Michael Griswold (1987)

Mark Benson
Richard Kline (1996)

Doctor.

Johnny Berlanti
Jim Davidson (2005)

Doctor.

Beverly
Gina Rodriguez (2011–12)

Jerry Birn
Russell Todd (1995)

Christine Blair
Lauralee Bell (2007)

The Young and the Restless character

Edward Bradley
Kevin Symons (2003)

Lisa Brauer
Robin Karfo (2003–12)

Doctor.

Michelle Brookner
Karen Moncrieff (1989)

Grace Buckingham
Cassandra Creech (2022, 2024)

Paris Buckingham
Diamond White (2020–24)

Reese Buckingham
Wayne Brady (2018–19)

Zoe Buckingham
Kiara Barnes (2018–21)

Brian Burke
Jeff Allin (1987–95)

Police Lieutenant.

Betty Burns
June Claman (1989–90)

Walter Bynum
Mark Ankeny (2001–06)

== C ==
Beth Cambridge
Corie Vickers (2007)

Rape Crisis Counselor.

Cannon
Scott Palmer (1999–2000)

Doctor

Steve Caplan
D.J. Pierce (2013)

Brian Carey
Kin Shriner (1995–96)

Doctor.

Abby Carlton
Darcy Rose Byrnes (2007–08)

The Young and the Restless character

Brad Carlton
Don Diamont (1993)

Crossover from The Young and the Restless.

Rocco Carner
Bryan Genesse (1987–89, 2009)

Marsha Caron
Nancy Bell (2007–09)

Doctor.

Tony "Rush"/Jonny Carerra
Anthony Addabbo (1997–98)

Diana Carter
Skyla and Starla Thoma (2003)
Mason and Weston Bodle (2003)

Mary Carter Warwick/Erica Lovejoy
Amber and Jade Collins (1997)
Jacob and Lucas Barnes (1997)
Sarah and Jessica Haas (1998)
Courtnee Draper (2002)

Molly Carter
Marilyn Alex (1992, 1993, 1994, 1997–98)

Former The Young and the Restless character

Sheila Carter
Kimberlin Brown (1992–98, 2002–03, 2017–18, 2021–)

Former The Young and the Restless character

Caspary
Jacqueline Hahn (2005–13, 2017)

Doctor.

Grant Chambers
Charles Grant (1996–98)

Eila Chisholm
Michelle C. Bonilla (2013)

Katherine Chancellor
Jeanne Cooper (2005)

Crossover from The Young and the Restless.

Madeline Collins
Fran Bennett (1987)

Judge.

Dutch Concierge
Jason Downs (2014)

Megan Conley
Maeve Quinlan (1995–2006)

Traci Connelly
Beth Maitland (2007)

Crossover from The Young and the Restless.

Theresa Corazon
Sandra Vergara (2013)

Alisa Cordova
Sabrina Bryan (2002)

Corky
Skip Stellrecht

Alicia Cortéz
Ivonne Coll (1996–97)

Claudia Cortéz
Lilly Melgar (1996–97)

Lucien Cortéz
Emilio Rivera (1996–97)

Steve Crown
Perry Stephens (1993)

Joseph Culkin
Richard Neil (2007)

Judge Cunningham
Richard Hoyt-Miller (2003–05)

== D ==
Darlita
Danube Hermosillo (2017–18)

Aldo Damiano
Antonio Sabàto Sr. (2006)

Anabella Damiano
Renée Pietrangelo (2006)

Carlo Damiano
Alberto Brosio (2006)

Dante Damiano
Antonio Sabàto Jr. (2005–06)

Dominick "Dino" Damiano
Kendal and Kaia Huebner (2005–06)
Andrew and Jacob Scotto (2006–08)
Eric and Jacob Steinberger (2007)

Filomena Damiano
Irina Maleeva (2006)

Luigi Damiano
Vito D'Ambrosio (2006)

Reverend Daniels
David Frankham (1987)

Graham Darros
Justin Baldoni (2010)

Connor Davis
Scott Thompson Baker (1993–98, 2000, 2002, 2005)

Ron Deacon
Greg Wrangler (1987)

Ziggy Deadmarsh
Matt Borlenghi (2002)

Ed De La Rosa
Kurt Caceres (2016)

Rudy Delight
Bryce Mouer (2003)

Julie Delorean
Jane A. Rogers (1990–92)

Kelly DeMartin
Erin Moran (2009)

Mike DeMartin
Barry Livingston (2009)

Morgan DeWitt
Sarah Buxton (2000–01, 2005)

Natalie DeWitt
Pat Crowley (2005)

Brenda Dickerson
Barbara Niven (1996)

Detective Digby
Kevin E. West (2007)

DiSanto
Monique DiSanto (2014)

Doctor.

Deveney Dixon
Judith Borne (1988–89)

Jennifer Doheny
Melinda Sward (2001)

Antonio Dominguez
Paulo Benedeti (2001–02, 2012–13, 2017)

Eduardo Dominguez
Erik Estrada (2001)

Liliana Dominguez
Rosanna DeSoto (2001)

Eli Donovan
Loren Lester (2006–07)

Sly Donovan
Brent Jasmer (1992–96)

Ann Douglas
Betty White (2006–09)
Cristin Mortenson - Young Ann (2006)

John Douglas
Stephen O'Mahoney (2006)

Pamela Douglas
Alley Mills (2006–19, 2021)
Gigi Goff - Young Pamela (2006)

Locanda Drummer
Rick Alegria (2002–07)

Fabrice Dufau
François Giroday (2009)

Darcy Dylan
Kelly Sullivan (2026-)

Melissa Dylan
Sydney Bullock (2025–)

== E ==
Mrs. Eckert
Geraldine Allen (2000)

Veronica Edivez
Anne Betancourt (1997)

Judge.

Elderkin
James Ingersoll (2001)

Doctor.

Teresa Emerson
Olivia Virgil White (1997)

District Attorney.

Heather Engle
Shari Headley (2004–05)

Penny Escobar
Monica Ruiz (2020)

Martin Escobosa
Alejandro Delgado (2000–01)

Charlie Espinada
Eduardo Matos (2001)

Estefan
J. Omar Castro (2013)

Robin Everett
Nicole Panucci (2001)

== F ==
Kimberly Fairchild
Ashley Lyn Cafagna (1998–2001)

Saul Feinberg
Michael Fox (1989–96)

Saul Feinberg Jr.
Alex Wyse (2017–18)

Lauren Fenmore
Tracey E. Bregman (1992–99, 2002, 2004, 2007, 2022–24)

Carl Ferret
Sean Whalen (2007–11)

Nick Fielding
Michael Ryan Way (1998)

Jack Finnegan
Ted King (2021–)

John "Finn" Finnegan
Tanner Novlan (2020–)

Li Finnegan
Naomi Matsuda (2021–)

Father Fontana
Luca Calvani (2012–13)

Alexandria "Aly" Forrester
Haven Cain (2004)
Cole Pettit (2004)
Matrix Springer (2004)
Ava and Eva Ashcraft (2005)
Harley Graham (2006–09)
Ashlyn Pearce (2013–15)

Angela Forrester/Denveney Dixon
Judith Borne (1988–89)

Bridget Forrester
Morgan and Jordan Turner (1992–95)
Caitlin Wachs (1995–97)
Landry Allbright (1997)
Agnes Bruckner (1997–2000)
Jennifer Finnigan (2000–04)
Emily Harrison (2004)
Ashley Jones (2004–13, 2015–16, 2018, 2020–)

Darla Forrester
Schae Harrison (1989–2007, 2014–15)

Eric "Rick" Forrester Jr.
Jeremy Snider (1991)
Steven Hartman (1995–97)
Jacob Young (1997–99, 2011–18)
Justin Torkildsen (1999–2006)
Kyle Lowder (2007–11)

Eric Forrester Sr.
John McCook (1987–)
Chad W. Evans - Young Eric (2009)

Felicia Forrester
Colleen Dion-Scotti (1990–92, 1997, 2004)
Lesli Kay (2005–14, 2016)

Ivy Forrester
Ashleigh Brewer (2014–18, 2024–)

Jessica Forrester
Maitland Ward (1994–96)

John Forrester
Fred Willard (2014–15)

Kristen Forrester Dominguez
Teri Ann Linn (1987–90, 1992–94)
Tracy Melchior (2001–09, 2012–13, 2017)

Margaret "Maggie" Forrester
Barbara Crampton (1995–98)

Phoebe Forrester
Alexis Collins (2000)
Alison Johnston (2000)
Sophia Schuring (2001)
Brynne McNabb (2002–03)
Chandler Mella (2004)
Keaton Tyndall (2004)
Addison Hoover (2005–06)
MacKenzie Mauzy (2006–08)

Ridge "R.J." Forrester Jr.
Jacob and Lukas Manos (2004–2006)
Ridge Perkett (2006–2009)
Trevor Shores (2010–2011)
Jack Horan (2011)
Mace Coronel (2013–2014)
Anthony Turpel (2016–2018)
Joshua Hoffman (2023–2024)
Brayan Nicoletti (2026–)

Ridge Forrester Sr.
Ronn Moss (1987–2012)
Lane Davies (1992)
Thorsten Kaye (2013–)
Aaron Phypers (2020, body double)

Rosie Forrester
Keanu Kai'ree Hammock (2011)
Isaiah Proctor (2011)
Layla and Lily Lugo (2011)
Ginger and Tiger Lily Siler (2011–13)

Stephanie "Steffy" Forrester
Allyson Collins (2000)
Brooke Johnston (2000)
Whitney Schuring (2001)
Cameryn McNabb (2002–05)
Kylie Tyndall (2004–05)
Alex Hoover (2005–06)
Jacqueline MacInnes Wood (2008–13, 2015–)
Kayla Ewell (2020–21, body double)

Stephanie Forrester
Susan Flannery (1987–2012, 2018)
Danielle Chuchran - Young Stephanie (2006)

Thomas Forrester
Adam and Noah Mayeda (1998)
Erin and Rachel Koch (1998–99)
Christian and Donovan Jouvin (2000)
Logan and Skyler Hudson (2001)
Patrick Dorn (2002–03)
Drew Tyler Bell (2004–10)
Adam Gregory (2010–14)
Pierson Fodé (2015–18)
Matthew Atkinson (2019–)

Thorne Forrester
Clayton Norcross (1987–89)
Jeff Trachta (1989–96)
Winsor Harmon (1996–2016, 2022–23)
Ingo Rademacher (2017–19)

Zende Forrester Dominguez
Daniel E. Smith (2001–02, 2005)
Rome Flynn (2015–17)
Delon de Metz (2020–)

Gary Freyberg
Jerry Hauck (1997)

Hillard Friedman
Rob Brownstein (2007–08)

Judge.

Quinn Fuller
Rena Sofer (2013–2022)

Florence "Flo" Fulton
Katrina Bowden (2019–22)

Shauna Fulton
Denise Richards (2019–22, 2026)

== G ==
Sheldon Gale
Michael Tylo (2000)

Charles Garner
MacKenzie Allen (1987)

Clarke "C.J." Garrison Jr.
Michelle Heap (1991)
Jacob and Tyler DeHaven (1991–93)
Taylor Joseph Robinson (1993–94)
Christopher and Kevin Graves (1994–95)
Kyle Sabihy (1995–97)
Mick Cain (1997–2004, 2007, 2010, 2017)

Clarke Garrison Sr.
Daniel McVicar (1987–92, 1996–2009)

Jay Garvin
Brett Stimely (1992-94)

Doctor.

Rich Ginger
Alan Thicke (2006–09)

Marvin Glick
Murray Leaward (1992)

Harvey Golden
Bob Joles (2007)

Jesse Graves
Ricky Paull Goldin (2013)

Martin "Marty" Guthrie
David L. Lander (1997–98)

Doctor.

Mike Guthrie
Ken Hanes (1993–98, 2010, 2022–23)

== H ==
Jack Hamilton
Chris Robinson (1992–94, 1996–2002, 2005)

Zachary "Zach" Hamilton
Michael Watson (1992)

L. Harvey
Scott Broderick (2016)
Telvin Griffin (2018)

Police officer.

Blake Hayes
Peter Brown (1991–92)

Taylor Hayes Forrester
Hunter Tylo (1990–2002, 2004–14, 2018–19)
Sherilyn Wolter (1990)
Krista Allen (2021–2023)
Rebecca Budig (2024–)

Psychiatrist who competes with Brooke Logan for Ridge Forrester's affections.

Gordon Heffler
Tony Winters (1989)

Doctor.

Barry Holden
Robert Patten (1987)

Hudson
Joseph Marcell (2003–04)

Chad Huffington
Jack Armstrong (2001)

== I ==
Margo Ivey
Nafessa Williams (2012)

== J ==
Harold Jackson
Cameron Smith (1997)

Harry Jackson
Ben Hogestyn (2006)

Andy Johnson
Paul Ganus (2007)

Jim Johnson
Jim O'Brien (2013)

Judy Johnson
Nan Wolff (1990–98)

Aggie Jones AKA Sandy Sommers
Sarah Brown (2009–11)

Hunter Jones
Tristan Rogers (1997)

Private Investigator.

Joy Jones
Mary Kay Wulf (2002)

Oliver Jones
Zack Conroy (2010–15)

Ted Jones
Karl T. Wright (2000–01)

Private Investigator.

Whipple "Whip" Jones III
Rick Hearst (2002, 2009–11)

Pierre Jourdan
Robert Clary (1990–92)

== K ==
Priscilla Kelly
Linda Gray (2004–05)

Samantha Kelly
Sydney Penny (2003–05)

Don Kessler
Vaughn Armstrong (1992)

Ken Kirkman
Craig Stepp (1991)

Chester Kline
Chester A. Watson Jr. (1992)

April Knight
Adrienne Frantz (2003)

Casper Knight
Brandon Beemer (2009)

Owen Knight
Brandon Beemer (2008–12)

Luc Kooning
Nick Jameson (1994–95)

Jerry Kramer
Hal Linden (2006–07)

== L ==
Michael Lai
Lindsay Price (1995–97)

Madison Lee
Stephanie Wang (2007–14)

Dayzee Leigh Forrester
Kristolyn Lloyd (2010–13)

Anna Li
Leslie Ishii (2015)

Ann Lloyd
Erin Cummings (2007)

Elizabeth "Beth" Logan
Judith Baldwin (1987)
Nancy Burnett (1987–89, 1994, 1996–98, 2000–01)
Marla Adams (1991)
Robin Riker (2008–10)

Brooke Logan Forrester
Katherine Kelly Lang (1987–)
Catherine Hickland (1987)
Sandra Ferguson (1997)

Donna Logan
Carrie Mitchum (1987–91, 1994–95, 2001)
Mary Sheldon (2001)
Jennifer Gareis (2006–)

Helen Logan
Lesley Woods (1987–89, 2001)

Hope Logan
Amanda and Rachel Pace (2004–09)
Kimberly Matula (2010–16)
Annika Noelle (2018–)

Katie Logan Spencer
Nancy Sloan (1987–89, 1991, 1994–98, 2000–01, 2003–04)
Heather Tom (2007–)

Stephen "Storm" Logan Jr.
Ethan Wayne (1987–88, 1994, 1998, 2000–01, 2003)
Brian Patrick Clarke (1990–91)
William deVry (2006–08, 2012)

Stephen Logan Sr.
Robert Pine (1988, 1994, 1996–97, 2000–01)
Patrick Duffy (2006–11, 2022–23)

E. Lopez
Brandon Morales (2016–17)

Police officer.

Giovanni Lorenzano
Victor Alfieri (1999–2000, 2004, 2009)

Curtis Love
Matthew Cowles (1997)

Erica Lovejoy
Amber and Jade Collins (1997)
Jacob and Lucas Barnes (1997)
Jessica and Sarah Haas (1998)
Courtnee Draper (2002)

Margo Maclaine Lynley
Lauren Koslow (1987–92, 2002)

== M ==
Ben Maclaine
John Brandon (1990–91)

Charlie Maclaine
Chuck Walling (1990–91)

Helen Maclaine
Tippi Hedren (1990–91)

Jake Maclaine
Todd McKee (1990–92, 2007–13, 2015–16, 2018–19)

Mark Maclaine
Michael Dietz (2002–05)

Jasmine Malone
Lark Voorhies (1995–96)

Dominick "Nick" Marone
Jack Wagner (2003–12, 2022)

Jack Marone
Mallory Mae Garza (2007)
Cameron and McKenzie Carr (2007–09)
Edward and James Nigbor (2009–10)
Frank and Morgan Gingerich (2010–11)

Jackie Marone
Lesley-Anne Down (2003–12)

Massimo Marone IV
Joseph Mascolo (2001–06)

Oscar Marone
Brian Gaskill (2003–04)

Jarrett Maxwell
Andrew Collins (2004–19)

Shane McGrath
Dax Griffin (2006–07)

Ricardo Montemayor
Victor Rivers (2013–14)

Alison Montgomery
Theodora Greece (2011–16)

Ramon Montgomery
A Martinez (2011–12)

Ambrosia "Amber" Moore
Adrienne Frantz (1997–2005, 2010–12)

Rebecca "Becky" Moore
Marissa Tait (1999–2000)

Tawny Moore
Andrea Evans (1999–2000, 2010–11)

Gabriela Moreno
Shanelle Workman (2005)

== N ==
Kevin Namura
Kipp Shiotani (2004–06)

Doctor.

Don Navarone
Terrence Riggins (1994)

Nikki Newman
Melody Thomas Scott (2022)

Crossover from The Young and the Restless.

Summer Newman
Hunter King (2021)

Crossover from The Young and the Restless.

Victor Newman
Eric Braeden (1999)

Crossover from The Young and the Restless.

Carlos Nunez
Henry Darrow (1998–2001)

Doctor.

Cruz Nunez
Alejandro De Hoyos (2003)

== O ==
Ted O'Connor
Gregory White (1991)

Micah Okwu
Marcellas Reynolds (2005)

Jon Oplinger
Richard Karn (2017)

Judge.

Othello
Othello R. Clarke (2011–15, 2018)

Devin Owens
Kevin Dobson (2006–07)

Judge.

Jason Owens
Shavar Ross (1991)

Ruthanne Owens
Michelle Davison (1991–93, 1995, 1997)

Yvette Owens
LaGloria Scott (1991)

== P ==
Elliott Parker
Robert Gentry (1993)

Constantine Parros
Constantine Maroulis (2007)

Tracy Peters
Marnie Mosiman (1992–93)

Doctor.

Pierce Peterson
Paul Satterfield (1998–1999, 2001–2002)

Doctor.

Philips
Robin Givens (2017–)

Doctor.

Robert Pinot
Jack Marston (1990)

Doctor.

Gladys Pope
Phyllis Diller (1996–2012)

Todd Powell
Cal Bartlett (1988–89)
Josef Rainer (1989)

Doctor.

== Q ==
Tricia Quick
Tamara Davies (2002–03)

Doctor.

== R ==
Caitlin Ramirez
Kayla Ewell (2004–05)

Christian Ramirez
Mario Lopez (2006)

Doctor.

Hector Ramirez
Lorenzo Lamas (2004–06)

Jimmy Ramirez
Chris Warren Jr. (2004–05)

Steve Ranker
Sean McGowan (2002)

Doctor.

Omar Rashid
Kabir Bedi (1994–95, 2005)

Prince of Morocco.

Dave Reed
Stephen Shortridge (1987)

Tim Reid
Aaron Lustig (2001)

Doctor.

Bonnie Roberts
Dorothy Lyman (1991–92)

Cruz Rodriguez
Carlos Albert (2003)

Peter Russell
Julian Starks (2000)

Doctor.

Bill Ryan
James C. Burns (2009)

Army Doctor.

== S ==
Alex Sanchez
Jeremy Ray Valdez (2018)

Detective.

Mick Savage
Jeff Conway (1989–90)

Deacon Sharpe
Sean Kanan (2000–05, 2012, 2014–17, 2021–)

Dylan Shaw
Dylan Neal (1994–97)

Coco Spectra
Courtney Grosbeck (2017–18)

Sally Spectra
Darlene Conley (1989–2007)
Uncredited actress (2012)
Ruth Williamson (2017)

Sally Spectra Jr.
Courtney Hope (2017–20)

Shirley Spectra
Patrika Darbo (2017–18)

William "Bill" Spencer Jr.
Don Diamont (2009–)

William "Bill" Spencer Sr.
Jim Storm (1987–94, 1997, 2000, 2003, 2009)

Caroline Spencer
Linsey Godfrey (2012–18)

Caroline Spencer Forrester
Joanna Johnson (1987–90, 1992, 2001)

Danielle Spencer
Crystal Chappell (2012–13)

Karen Spencer
Joanna Johnson (1991–94, 2009, 2011–14)

Liam Spencer
Scott Clifton (2010–)

Will Spencer
Crew Morrow (2024–)

Wyatt Spencer
Darin Brooks (2013–24, 2026–)

Yvette St. Julienne
Tonya Kinzinger (2007)

Dax Stevenson
Edward Boyd (2000)

== T ==
Jeff Talon
John Castellanos (1987)

District Attorney.

Jennifer Tartaro
Debbi Morgan (2006–07)

District Attorney.

Veronica Thomas
Paula Christensen (2002)

Heather Thompson
Shari Shattuck (1992)

Sasha Thompson
Felisha Cooper (2015–17)

Toro
Jordi Caballero (2003)

Jesse Torres
Ricky Paull Goldin (2013)

== V ==
Esther Valentine
Kate Linder (2023)

Crossover from The Young and the Restless.

Ivana Vanderveld
Monika Schnarre (1994–95)

== W ==
Steve Wacker
Henderson Wade (2009)

Anthony Walker
Rodney Saulsberry (2010–13)

Carter Walton
Lawrence Saint-Victor (2013–)

Attorney.

Damon Warwick
James Doohan (1996–97)

James Warwick
Ian Buchanan (1993–99, 2004, 2008–09, 2011, 2017)

Doctor.

Charlie Webber
Alan F. Smith (2003)
Dick Christie (2013–)

Robin West
Allison Argo (1987)

Conway Weston
Jerry Ayres (1987–91)

Private Investigator.

Clyde Whitfield
Michael Klinger (2013)

Ruth Wilson
Jacqueline Scott (1987)

== Y ==
James Young
Jon Simmons (1999)

Church Minister.

Jonathan Young
Joseph Campanella (1996–2006)

== See also ==
- List of The Bold and the Beautiful characters (1980s)
- List of The Bold and the Beautiful characters (1990s)
- List of The Bold and the Beautiful characters (2000s)
- List of The Bold and the Beautiful characters (2010s)
- List of The Bold and the Beautiful characters (2020s)
