= Dayzee Leigh =

- The Bold and the Beautiful character
- Portrayed by: Kristolyn Lloyd
- Duration: 2010–13
- First appearance: October 7, 2010
- Last appearance: December 2, 2013
- Introduced by: Bradley Bell
In-universe information
- Other names: Dayzee Forrester
- Occupation: Café owner
- Husband: Marcus Forrester (2012–)
- Stepdaughters: Rosie Forrester

Dayzee Leigh is a fictional character from the American CBS soap opera The Bold and the Beautiful. Portrayed by Kristolyn Lloyd, the character was introduced by head writer Bradley Bell on October 7, 2010. Lloyd played the character in a recurring status until she was promoted to contract status and became a series regular. Dayzee was initially a poor young woman, working and living on the streets of Skid Row, Los Angeles. She soon started a friendship with the show's matriarch Stephanie Forrester, who was diagnosed with lung cancer at the time. Dayzee gave her the incentive she needed to undergo treatment, which saved her life. Bell was highly involved in the making of the character and the Skid Row storyline, and Lloyd had a background knowledge of it because of her charity work in Los Angeles and overseas.

Dayzee was introduced to give everyone a new take on the world and a "new set of glasses". Since then, Dayzee has used her newfound power in the Forrester family to become an advocate for poverty with the help of Stephanie. She has also had romances with Thomas and Marcus Forrester, to whom she was later married. The Skid Row storyline which Dayzee was an integral part of garnered positive reviews. Akash Nikolas of Zap2it noted that while she was involved with Thomas, his sister Steffy Forrester highly disapproved of Dayzee because of her background, and said that the show was "playing around" with the race issue.

== Casting ==
Actress Kristolyn Lloyd first appeared in the role of Dayzee Leigh on October 7, 2010. Previously, Lloyd worked primarily on stage productions, such as the musicals Romeo and Juliet and As You Like It. She most recently had parts in the high-production musicals Rent and Hairspray, while also making an appearance in the medical drama series ER. The show's head writer and executive producer, Bradley Bell was in attendance during Lloyd's audition for the series. She said, "Brad is so hands-on with this storyline. During my audition, I didn't even know Brad was the executive producer because they rarely show up at auditions, but that's how involved he is."

On October 28, 2010, it was announced by the show's head writer and executive, Bradley Bell that she was moved from recurring to a contract status. Of Lloyd being a regular cast member, Bell stated: "Kristolyn is a gifted young actress and I'm happy to have her as a permanent member of the B&B family. As we moved forward in telling the story of the plight of the homeless, I realized that the character of 'Dayzee' had so much more to offer and needed to stick around to make sure that everyone kept their 'new set of glasses' on."

== Development ==
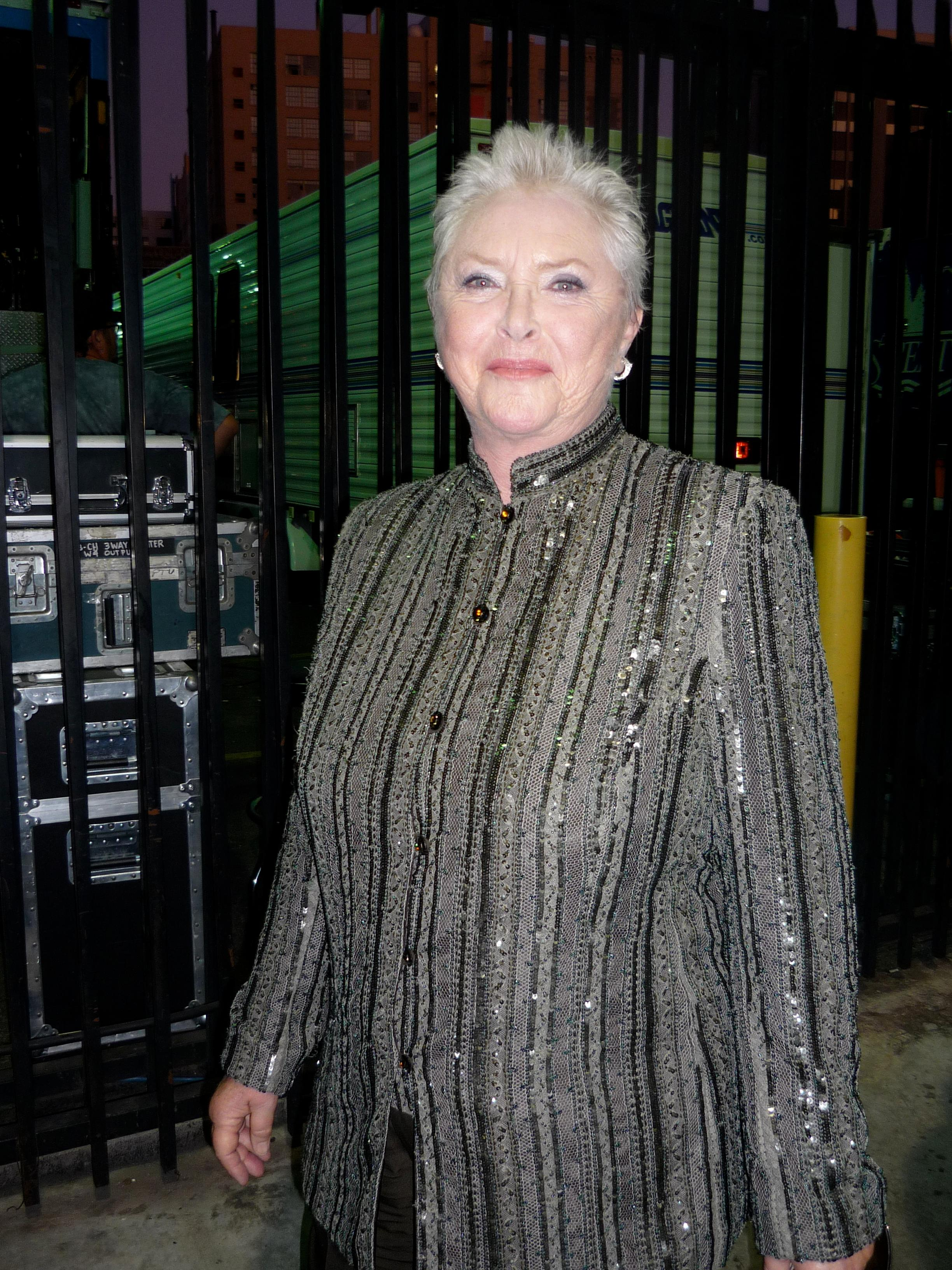
Susan Flannery played corporate executive Stephanie, whom Dayzee influenced to get treatment for her cancer.

=== Characterization ===
In September 2010, the show's control-freak matriarch Stephanie Forrester (Susan Flannery) was diagnosed with stage four lung cancer. Initially, she refused to have treatment. Dayzee was introduced to show her a new lease on life. She became the key person who encouraged Stephanie to undergo treatment, which had ultimately saved her life. The show's official website describes Dayzee as: "Once a resident of Los Angeles' most impoverished neighborhood of Skid Row, Dayzee still serves as a guardian angel to the community she once called home." Romantically and optimistically, Dayzee can be flirtatious and allows everyone she comes across to view the world with "a new set of glasses". In October 19, 2011, it was announced that Gina Rodriguez would join the show as an unprivileged friend of Dayzee's, Beverly. Beverly is the first non-core character whom Dayzee has interacted with on the show. On November 11, 2011 a special episode dedicated to war veterans aired. Dayzee honored them at her coffee shop. Dayzee has stood by Stephanie since the start of their friendship. Even when Stephanie schemed to break up Brooke Logan (Katherine Kelly Lang) and Ridge Forrester (Ron Moss), Dayzee pushed her to do the right thing. They are considered friends for life. Although Stephanie survived, in October 2012 the cancer came back, and she died on November 26, 2012.

=== Skid Row storyline ===
The character was introduced to bring awareness for the homeless situation and people living in Skid row. Lloyd said: "I offered my insight more than research." On how he came up with it, Bradley Bell said: "Every day I drive into work, and I see all these homeless people who may have mental health issues like ADHD etc." Additionally, he said: "It feels like the show is where I want it to be. We're bringing in a lot of reality to the show along with romance and some fantasy." Real homeless people were brought in to shoot scenes. Lloyd said that: "Brad is so hands-on with this storyline", having shown up to her audition, which not many producers do. She stated that she had experience with homeless people: "Another reason why this is great is because after I did missionary work in Indonesia last year, it led me to doing some work on Skid Row every Saturday."Lloyd noted that the character was completely different prior to her audition; but after seeing her, Bell based Dayzee around her.

The hardships of skid row is first introduced when Stephanie meets Dayzee there. In one episode, she states: "This is my town [sic] I live 20 minutes away yet it seems 1,000 miles away. I promised I'd make a difference, yet when I see them I turn away. What is my burden compared to theirs?" In another episode, Flannery did unscripted interviews with homeless people while still as Stephanie. The storyline raised awareness; Flannery stated the Union Rescue Mission website following the episodes. According to Christina Hoag of the Omaha World-Herald: "Skid Row residents involved in the production said they were pleased they were portrayed with dignity, as people getting their lives together instead of being down and out, and that the show has continued relationships with them." Community activist General Jeff said that the show had organized for the real homeless people to be cared for. He praised the show, stating: "They weren't just pushing their fluff story, they're adding the human element," he said. "It's great for our community to be respected as individual human beings, not like we're homeless and hopeless." During an interview with TV Guide's Michael Logan, Bell noted that several people featured in the storyline had been in jail and addicted to drugs. After the awareness plot was slowly coming to a close, Bell said that Stephanie's friendship with Dayzee would continue, as would her outreach to the mission and the people of Skid Row.

=== Relationships ===
"Now...what is that if not code for racism? Steffy could easily be saying that she wants her brother to date a white girl and the conflict would be the same. But the show is too timid to go there so instead, they obscure race and cloak it in class conflict."

— Akash Nikolas of Zap2It on the race issue.

Dayzee's first major love interest was Thomas Forrester (Adam Gregory). Although she was a poor black girl, he was a rich white guy. The relationship is approved by all, except for Steffy Forrester (Jacqueline MacInnes Wood) Thomas' sister. According to Akash Nikolas of Zap2it, the show was "dancing around the race issue." Steffy thought that Dayzee wasn't beautiful, educated or sophisticated enough for her brother. Nikolas called the show out for not going further into the race issue, and accused the writers of playing with it, but not addressing it fully. He wrote: "no one else calls Steffy on it or even suggests that race might be the issue, which is even more absurd [sic] The show wants you to get it (wink wink) without actually acknowledging race and racism." It was unknown if Thomas actually had feelings for Dayzee, or if he was using her to get over his step-mother, Brooke, to whom he was previously attracted to. Jillian Bowe of Zap2It commented that she liked the romance between Thomas and Dayzee: "Not for nothing, but I am enjoying Thomas going after Dayzee. It did come out of nowhere, but I'd like to see it grow into something more." Bowe also discussed the race issue: "Maybe viewers can discover it is just more than Dayzee's social status that Steffy hates. Just sayin."

The couple split up. Soon, Dayzee is in love with Marcus Forrester (Texas Battle); they had previously flirted before she had a relationship with Thomas, after feeling an "Instant connection." This was evident onscreen. In July 2012, Dayzee and Marcus were married at the Forrester mansion in Bel Air. Stephanie and Eric invited the media, family and friends to the event. Tommy Garret of Highlight Hollywood noted how far both character have come, writing: "Dayzee's life is different now, since her days on the streets of skidrow in Los Angeles, the beautiful young lady is now a WeHo based business owner, and Marcus is adopted into the famed Forrester family."

== Storylines ==
=== Backstory ===
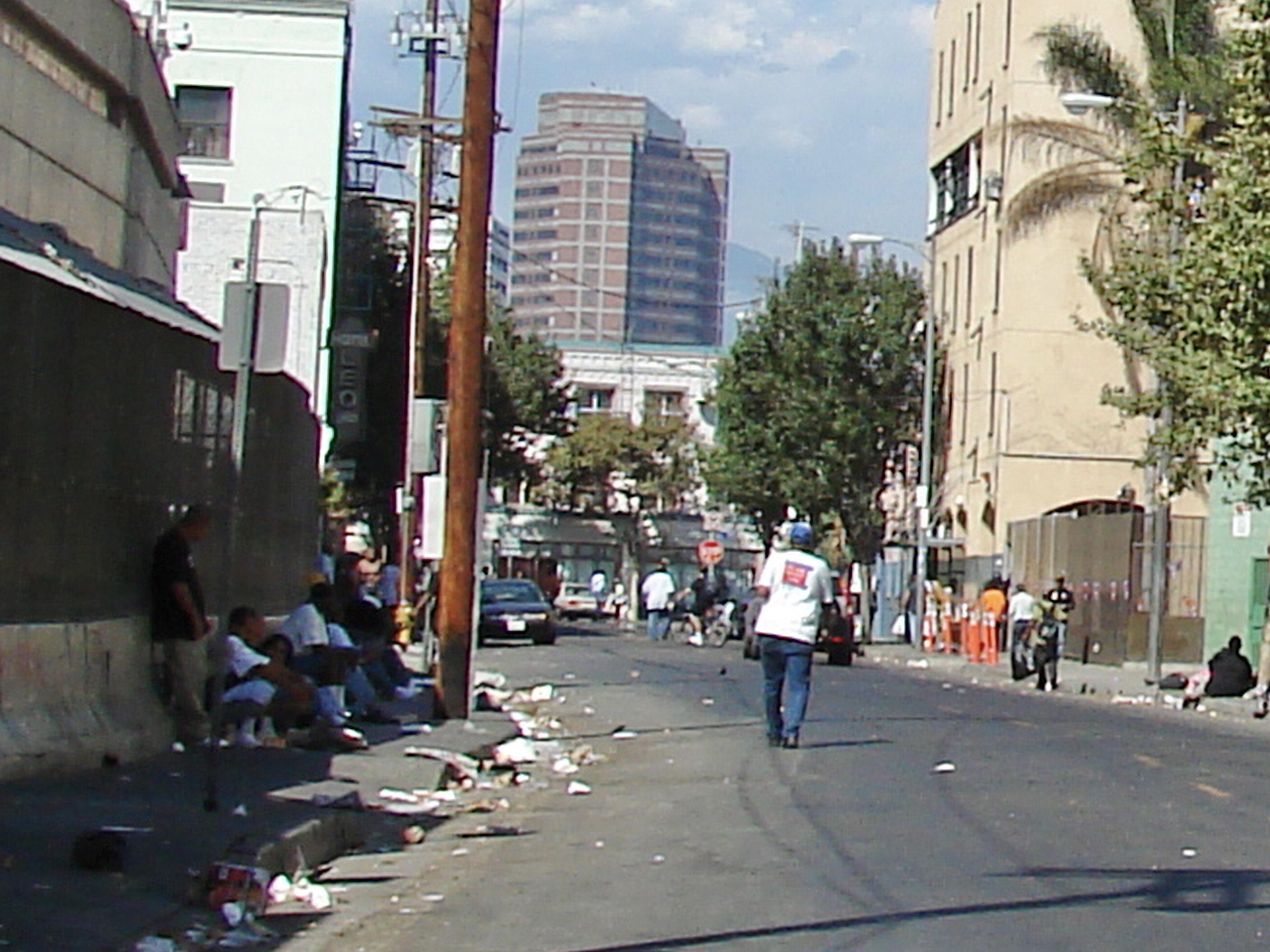
Skid Row, Los Angeles; this is where Dayzee's story began.

Dayzee has lived in Los Angeles her entire life, despite not experiencing the rich or lavish side the Forrester Family have been in. Dayzee's mother suffered a drug addiction and practically lived in rehab, and she is now dead. Dayzee had an extremely rough childhood and teenage years. She lived without good nutrition for large amounts of time while living on the street.

=== 2010–13 ===
Dayzee was introduced when she had found Stephanie's expensive scarf which had flown off, but refused to give it back. Stephanie snapped at her, so Dayzee threatened to hurt her with a broken bottle. After calming down, Stephanie saw that the scarf was needed to nurture an infant child at the homeless skid row. Dayzee was temporarily looking after the baby because her mother was in rehab. Although bitter at first, she began telling Stephanie about the life on the other side of Los Angeles. Stephanie was deeply touched, and shared with Dayzee the news about her lung cancer. They become friends, and Dayzee encouraged Stephanie to have treatment. Stephanie, inspired to do something with her life by helping heal poverty, fought her cancer and recovered. She gave Dayzee the pool house on the Forrester property to live in. She met several local pillars and socialites of the community. With financial support from the Forresters, she began advocating for people still suffering on skid row. She became an apprentice at skid row's Union Rescue Mission and donated large amounts of money. Stephanie, also, became highly involved in Dayzee's humanitarian projects.

Stephanie bought C.J. Garrison's (Mick Cain) Insomnia, a coffee shop, and gave it to Dayzee as a gesture of friendship. Dayzee had a huge opening of the revamped store and hired several homeless people from the streets to work for her. At the same time, she developed a romance with Thomas, Stephanie's grandson. His sister, Steffy did not like Dayzee because of where she came from. The relationship ended after his part in Stephanie's orchestration of breaking up Ridge and Brooke so he could be reunited with Thomas' mother Dr. Taylor Hayes (Hunter Tylo). Disgusted, she dumped Thomas. She then began romancing Marcus, Donna Logan and Justin Barbers son. Marcus had a child with Amber Moore (Adrienne Frantz) as a result of a one night stand. Amber tried to break up Dayzee and Marcus, but eventually gave up. Marcus proposed to Dayzee and they were married months later.

Happy with Marcus, Dayzee focuses on her coffeehouse and hires an aspiring actress named Maya to work there and lets her rent out the apartment above the coffeehouse. Rick, who starts volunteering there, meets Maya and feels a strong connection with her. Dayzee, out of concern for Maya, as well as Rick's girlfriend Caroline Spencer try to keep the two apart but to no avail. Dayzee, meanwhile, starts to get annoyed with Caroline because of her constant complaining about Rick and Maya. She later moves to Africa with Marcus.

== Reception ==
The Skid Row storyline which Dayzee was an integral part of was extremely well received by critics, and it earned the show a Daytime Emmy Award for Outstanding Drama Series. Christina Hoag of the Omaha World-Herald noted it as a departure for a show which revolves: "around a plush Beverly Hills mansion where characters who look like magazine models manipulate and machinate for love and money." Dayzee hired homeless people from Skid Row to work at her café; Hoag praised the storyline for its real-world impact. She reported that viewers had "flooded" the show's official facebook page with comments of support, and the show received over 800 emails including donations of $5 an upwards. Michael Logan of TV Guide called it: "pretty damn remarkable that The Bold and the Beautiful went down to L.A.'s Skid Row and hired some 25 real-life homeless people to tell their life stories on camera." Lloyd received an NAACP Image Award for Outstanding Actress in a Daytime Drama Series nomination of her portrayal of Dayzee.
