= Alan-Michael Spaulding =

- Guiding Light character
- Portrayed by: Jessica Zutterman (1981–83); Carl T. Evans (1987–90); Rick Hearst (1990–96); Michael Dietz (1996–97); Michael Dempsey (2005–07)
- Duration: 1981–83, 1987–97, 2005–07
- First appearance: September 23, 1981
- Last appearance: May 10, 2007
- Created by: Douglas Marland
- Introduced by: Allen M. Potter
In-universe information
- Parents: Alan Spaulding; Hope Bauer
- Half-brothers: Phillip Spaulding (adoptive); Gus Aitoro
- Half-sisters: Peyton Spaulding
- Wife: Harley Cooper (1989–90); Blake Thorpe (1990); Eleni Andros (1991–93); Lucy Cooper (1996–2005)
- Grandparents: Brandon Spaulding; Penelope Winthrop Spaulding; Mike Bauer; Julie Conrad Bauer
- Aunts: Alexandra Spaulding; Amanda Spaulding; Victoria Spaulding
- Nieces and nephews: Lizzie Spaulding (adoptive); Zach Spaulding (adoptive); James Spaulding (adoptive); Emma Spaulding (adoptive); Rafe Rivera
- First cousins: Lujack Luvonaczek; Nick McHenry Spaulding; Vicky Spaulding
- Other relatives: Sarah Randall (adoptive); Rick Bauer; Michelle Bauer Santos; Ed Bauer; Hillary Bauer

Alan-Michael Spaulding is a fictional character on the CBS soap opera Guiding Light. The character is the son of wealthy businessman, Alan Spaulding, and his former wife, Hope Bauer. Alan-Michael was born on-screen on September 23, 1981, but this was subsequently revised to 1970 when he turned 17 years old and then later to 1965 or 1966 during his brief dalliance with Marina Cooper in 2006.

Four actors have regularly portrayed the character, the most recent being Michael Dempsey from November 2005 to May 2007. Rick Hearst was the actor who portrayed him the longest, and is arguably the best known for the role. He was nominated for four Daytime Emmy Awards, winning his first in 1991.

The child who played him at birth was a baby girl named Jessica Zutterman.

Carl T. Evans introduced the teenage character on July 4, 1987, when Alan-Michael literally parachuted onto the annual Bauer barbecue. He played Alan-Michael until 1990 when Rick Hearst took over the character, playing him for six years. When he left, Michael Dietz was recast briefly (July 3, 1996, to February 7, 1997). In 2005, Guiding Light reintroduced the character with Michael Dempsey in the role.

== Family troubles ==
Alan-Michael was raised to adulthood by his mother in New York City and lived near his great great Aunt Trudy Bauer Palmer until he came to Springfield to live with his father when he was 17 years old. Until recently, he was the only biological son of his father, Alan Spaulding. Despite this, his adopted older brother, Phillip, seemed to be Alan's favorite and was groomed to take over the business while Alan-Michael was often left feeling overlooked and unloved. He is heavily influenced by his desire to be nothing like his father and brother on a personal level and his deep-rooted need to prove that he's just as capable as they are in business. While Alan and Philip are wholly proud of being Spauldings, Alan-Michael has always seen it as a mixed blessing, and sometimes more of a curse. He also has a deep-seated need for his father's approval which is usually at odds with his disdain for him. Conversely, he is much closer with his Aunt Alexandra who is usually an ally to him in business as well as personal matters.

Between 1992 and 1993, Alan-Michael was the only Spaulding by blood residing in Springfield, with Alan in prison, Philip and Beth out of town, and Alexandra out on a mission to find herself. Roger Thorpe took this opportunity to use Alan-Michael's inexperience to take over Spaulding Enterprises which he did with the help of jewel thief Jenna Bradshaw who claimed that her late father was responsible for the invention which brought Spaulding to the top of the business world. Ousted from his family's company, Alan-Michael searched desperately for Alexandra to no avail. Just when it seemed all was hopeless, Alexandra returned, and with the help of Bess Lowell (Brandon Spaulding's former executive secretary), they were able to regain control at Spaulding. As a reward, Bess received a great deal of money from Alexandra and gave Alan-Michael $1,000,000 to start his own business. The feisty senior citizen remarked to him that had she been born 50 years later, they would have made history. When Alan was released from prison, he utilized each of his family members to cause tension so he could take back over Spaulding, but when he came to an agreement with Alexandra, they made Alan-Michael president with the two of them sharing the title of heads of the board of directors. Alan-Michael's issues concerning girlfriend Lucy Cooper and psychotic Spaulding enterprises employee Brent Lawrence distracted him, and after his brother Philip's return, Alan-Michael and Lucy left town.

Alan-Michael, despite being a member of the richest and arguably most powerful family in Springfield, resided at The Beacon Hotel upon his return due mainly to his tempestuous relationship with his father. In 2007, he was forced to leave Springfield after Alan framed him for embezzlement, stating that he wouldn't lose another son to a vendetta (referring to Phillip's past troubles).

== Family ==
Alan-Michael is the only child born to the brief marriage of Alan Spaulding and Hope Bauer. His parents were mismatched from the beginning, and their relationship was fraught with difficulties. Alan's affair with Vanessa Chamberlain Reardon finally ended the marriage, which led Hope to drink. Her battle with alcoholism continued throughout Alan-Michael's early years. In 1986, Alan-Michael fell in love with Dinah Marler. However, Cameron Stewart tried to break the couple up. Later that year, Harley Cooper came to town. Harley, who loved Cameron, teamed up with Alan-Michael to stop Dinah and Cameron from getting closer. Much to their schemes, Dinah and Cameron could not resist temptation and began dating. Cameron left Harley and Alan-Michael was dumped by Dinah. So Alan-Michael wanted to get even so he and Harley began having sex. Alan-Michael wanted to gain his trust fund but learned from Alexandra that Alan would only let him have it if he was married or until he decides it's the right time. When Alan-Michael married Harley Cooper in 1988, his mother refused to attend, since Alan would be present at the wedding. Alan-Michael only married Harley to gain his trust fund in 1988, but despite his failure in that endeavour, he ended up falling in love with her. The marriage didn't last, however, because Alan made it seem like Harley had cheated on Alan-Michael, leading him to sleep with his brother, Phillip's wife Christina "Blake" Thorpe, who wanted to get even with Phillip who left her for Beth, who returned to town. Blake, who pretended she was pregnant, coerced Alan-Michael into divorcing Harley and marrying her so that she could continue to interfere with Beth and Phillip. Not long after their marriage, Blake faked a miscarriage, but the truth about her fake pregnancy was found out. Alan-Michael left Blake, but throughout the early 1990s, he and Blake would team up to feud with Alan. Alan-Michael soon fell in love with and married Eleni Andros. Eleni, however, had conceived a child before they married, thinking it was Alan-Michael's; when it was revealed to be Frank Cooper's instead, Eleni left Alan-Michael to marry Frank. Heartbroken yet again, Alan-Michael took over Spaulding Enterprises. He would date Josh's ex Tangie Hill in 1994, who also flirted with Alan, much to Josh's dislike. However, his heart would later be wooed by Lucy Cooper in 1995 whom he'd marry before leaving town in 1997. During this time, Alan-Michael's ex, Dinah Marler, returned to town, vowing revenge for leaving her to marry Harley Cooper all those years ago. Knowing how much the Spauldings, especially Alan Michael, had hatred for Roger Thorpe, Dinah saw a chance at getting even by marrying Roger, trying to make Alan-Michael jealous, however he was trying to break up Lucy and Brent Lawerence. So, Dinah gave up, but continued to marry Roger in order to gain her Trust Fund. Lucy left the crazy Brent Lawerence and went back to Alan-Michael in the summer of 1995. Alan-Michael and Gilly Grant teamed up in late 1995 and early 1996 to help Reva Shayne convince Josh and Annie Dutton to agree over joint custody of Marah and Shayne.

Alan-Michael would return in 2005, divorced from Lucy. He and Marina Cooper (ironically, the child Eleni had conceived with Frank) would have a brief courtship between 2005 and 2006, and he later had a courtship with Ava Peralta before leaving Springfield again.
