= Taylor Hayes =

Taylor Hayes may refer to:

- Taylor Hayes, American male actor from Songcatcher 2000
- Taylor Hayes (The Bold and the Beautiful), a fictional character on the CBS soap opera The Bold and the Beautiful
