= Whipple Jones (The Bold and the Beautiful) =

- The Bold and the Beautiful character
- Portrayed by: Rick Hearst
- Duration: 2002; 2009–11
- First appearance: Episode 3734; February 13, 2002
- Last appearance: Episode 6091; June 16, 2011
- Created by: Bradley Bell
In-universe information
- Other names: Whip
- Occupation: Promotions manager at Jackie M Designs; Former promotions manager at Forrester International; Former promotions manager at Forrester Creations
- Father: Whipple Jones Jr.
- Mother: Joy Jones
- Wife: Brooke Logan (2002); Taylor Hayes (2010–11)
- Grandfathers: Whipple Jones
- First cousins: Agnes Jones; Oliver Jones

Whipple Jones III is a fictional character from the CBS soap opera The Bold and the Beautiful, portrayed by Rick Hearst.

After a brief stint in 2002, it was announced in May 2009 that Hearst was returning, with his first return appearance being July 17, 2009. In 2011, however, the actor was bumped to recurring status, yet hasn't been seen since.

Two of his central storylines in the series revolve around a scheming relationship with Brooke Logan and marriage to her nemesis, Taylor Hayes.

== Storylines ==
=== Backstory ===
Whip worked with Forrester Creations since 1990. However, as revealed in the series, he still lives in an apartment with his mother in a less than desirable part of Los Angeles.

=== 2002 ===
Whip first appears when Ridge Forrester (Ron Moss) is attempting to take the Forrester Family Company away from his ex and CEO, Brooke Logan (Katherine Kelly Lang) while she is away dealing with a pregnancy, she later returns. It is revealed that Whip has spent over twelve years working as a promotional manager for the company, and has a very important position. After an attempt by Brooke to solidify family interests results in Whip being passed over in favor of Deacon Sharpe (Sean Kanan) for the position of promotions manager, Whip feels resentment towards Brooke.

When Stephanie Forrester (Susan Flannery), Ridge's mother and Brooke's enemy humiliates Brooke at a press conference by revealing the untimely pregnancy, Whip quickly steps in and claims he is the father to stop rumors about Brooke and to subdue the paparazzi. This confuses Brooke's children, Bridget Forrester and Rick Forrester as they previously heard nothing about Whip being a part of Brooke's life. The real father of the baby is Deacon Sharpe, (who was married to Brooke's daughter, Bridget) and the child was conceived during an affair between him and Brooke. Whip blackmails Brooke using the information about the real paternity to buy him a car and a house to improve his own situation.

Despite the blackmail, Whip develops true feelings for Brooke, but fails to seduce her when he tries. Brooke and Whip move to Paris, France together to avoid Deacon. Whip convinces Brooke to marry him to end everything with Deacon. Brooke still wants Deacon, but goes ahead with the wedding. However, the truth comes out in the end. The family disowns Brooke and Deacon. Whip and Brooke's marriage is annulled shortly after the scenario. Whip transfers himself back to Forester International where he remains for seven more years before his return.

=== 2009–11 ===
In 2009, Stephanie began searching for a public relations person for her new company, Jackie M. She came across Whip, and hired him not only for the company, but to lure Brooke away from her son Ridge, unaware that Brooke and Whip were never sexual as husband and wife. Whip later begins a relationship with Ridge's other love (who Ridge had abandoned) Taylor Hayes (Hunter Tylo). He helps her get over Ridge, however Brooke and Ridge both suspect that Taylor and Whip, were getting together to spite them. The two of them were married in Taylor's home. Taylor and Whip remained happy despite working for opposing companies (Jackie M Designs and Forrester Creations).

Whip finds himself involved in a scandal involving Forrester Creations. Before the runway special, he persuaded Taylor's son Thomas Forrester (Adam Gregory) to do something drastic to attract the public, but Thomas took it too far by kissing Brooke. Whip notices how close Ridge and Taylor are becoming especially in the wake of Thomas' publicity stunt involving Brooke; he warns Ridge to stay away from Taylor. Aggie (Whip's cousin) warns Whip not to go against Ridge, but Whip wants revenge. Taylor and Whip suffered marital problems when she found herself drawn to Ridge once again. Whip accuses Taylor of always making Brooke look back. Taylor later consumes hallucinogenic berries that Thomas brought back from the island he and Brooke were trapped on. Taylor goes crazy after eating them, thinking Whip is Ridge and being passionate with him. She goes to the hospital and later Whip and Taylor decide to divorce due to her unresolved feelings for Ridge. Whip quits Jackie M Designs and hasn't been seen since.

== Reception ==
In 2009, prior to the announcement of the character's return, Jamey Giddens from Daytime Confidential wrote that Hearst was in "fine form" when he portrayed Whipple in 2002, and called the character "wisecracking". He believed that "Whip was one of the most original, refreshing, funny characters B&B created in years, which of course is why they scrapped the role". Giddens wanted Whipple to return to "save Brooke from Rick and Ridge's "Show Me You Pickle" contest", and believed that he could be a love interest for Felicia Forrester (Lesli Kay), though Giddens joked, "Of course with my luck, they'd put him with one of those wicked Logan sisters, Katie or Donna".
