= Taylor Hayes (The Bold and the Beautiful) =

Fictional character from an American soap opera

- The Bold and the Beautiful character
- Rebecca Budig as Taylor Hayes
- Portrayed by: Hunter Tylo (1990–2019); Sherilyn Wolter (1990); Krista Allen (2021–2023); Rebecca Budig (2024–present)
- Duration: 1990–2002; 2004–2014; 2018–2019; 2021–present
- First appearance: June 6, 1990
- Created by: William J. Bell
- Introduced by: Lee Phillip Bell (1990); Bradley Bell (2004–2024)
- Book appearances: Collision Course (2013); Heart's Desire (2014)
- Krista Allen as Taylor Hayes
In-universe information
- Other names: Taylor Hamilton; Taylor Ashford; Taylor Forrester; Taylor Marone; Taylor Jones; Princess Laila Rashid
- Occupation: Psychiatrist; Oncologist; Businesswoman
- Parents: Jack Hamilton; Sharon Ashford
- Siblings: Zachary Hamilton
- Spouse: Blake Hayes (divorced); Ridge Forrester (1992–1995, 1998–2006); Omar Rashid (1994–1995) (Note: Taylor and Omar married in December 1994. However the marriage was declared void due to Taylor still being legally married to Ridge at the time.); Nick Marone (2007–2008); Whip Jones (2010–2011)
- Children: Thomas Forrester; Steffy Forrester; Phoebe Forrester
- Grandchildren: Douglas Forrester; Kelly Spencer; Hayes Finnegan

Taylor Hayes is a fictional character from the American CBS soap opera The Bold and the Beautiful. The character was created by William J. Bell and originated by Hunter Tylo during the episode dated June 6, 1990. Tylo exited the series in 1994 but returned several months later. She exited again in 1996 after being cast on Melrose Place, but returned shortly after being fired from that show for being pregnant. After Tylo grew dissatisfied with her character's direction and agreed with executive producer Bradley Bell that Taylor was "played out", the character was subsequently killed off and last appeared in October 2002. Tylo reprised Taylor as a ghost in 2004 before returning as a regular in April 2005, with the character revealed to be alive. Tylo exited The Bold and the Beautiful again in July 2013, but returned for guest appearances in 2014. She returned again from April 2018 to March 2019 on a recurring basis. The character was later recast with Krista Allen, who appeared as Taylor from December 2021 to November 2023. Rebecca Budig assumed the role in August 2024 when Taylor was revealed to be in Monaco.

Described as a world-renowned psychiatrist, Taylor was introduced to facilitate social issues and act as a romantic lead. In her early years, Taylor was characterized as "no-nonsense" and the "good girl" of the show. Most of her history has revolved around her relationship with love interest Ridge Forrester. Taylor rivaled Brooke Logan for Ridge's affections, with a love triangle between the three becoming a focus on the soap opera for many years. Ridge and Taylor were married twice, and had three children: a son Thomas, and twin daughters Phoebe (who died in 2008) and Steffy. When Taylor returned in 2005, she and Ridge had a short-lived reunion before the end of their marriage. Upon her reintroduction, Tylo stated that the character became "more real", experiencing alcoholism and depression. In the years that ensued, she became involved with Ridge's brother Thorne after accidentally causing the death of his wife in a hit and run accident, and also had short-lived marriages to Nick Marone and Whip Jones. The character relocated to Paris after a brief relationship with Ridge's father Eric. Upon her 2018 return, she was revealed as Bill Spencer Jr.'s shooter. From 2022 to 2023, Taylor shared a reunion with Ridge, which sparked a further rivalry with Brooke.

Taylor has been described as iconic by Entertainment Weekly, and Tylo emerged as a fan favorite in the 1990s. Ridge and Taylor are considered a soap opera supercouple, while the rivalry between Brooke and Taylor has generated considerable fan attention and divided audience opinions.

== Casting and creation ==
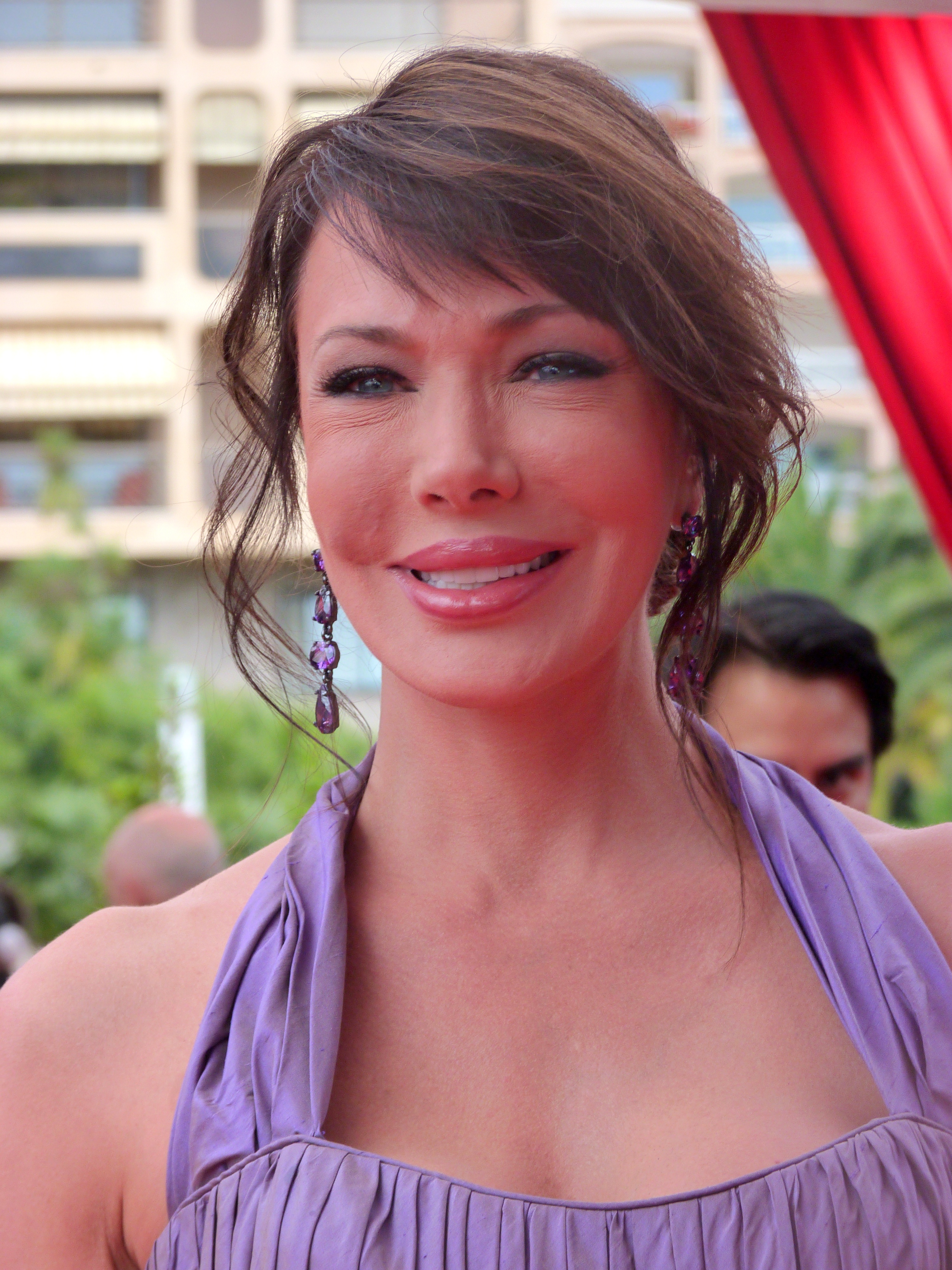
Hunter Tylo originated the role of Taylor, portraying the character for three decades; from 1990 until her departure in 2019.

Show creator William J. Bell introduced the role of psychiatrist Dr. Taylor Hamilton Hayes, played by Hunter Tylo, during the episode dated June 6, 1990. According to Variety, Bell created Taylor as "a romantic leading lady but also as a character who could facilitate social issues — and directly partake in a few, too". Previously, Tylo was dismissed from two other soaps, All My Children and Days of Our Lives. The actress noted that her "crazy sense of humor" and "funny business" could have won her the role of Taylor, and she said: "After the audition, they told me I was the only one right for the role. I think they liked my 'a woman's gotta do what a woman's gotta do' attitude." Sherilyn Wolter temporarily replaced Tylo in 1990. Tylo vacated the role in May 1994 to pursue other projects, but the soap opera left the door open for her to return, which she did months later. During her absence, the character was presumed to be dead. In March 1996, following Taylor's decreased airtime and rumors circulating of her exit, it was confirmed that the actress was to leave The Bold and the Beautiful after her contract expired that June, to pursue a primetime role on the Fox television drama Melrose Place. Taylor's final appearance was in May 1996. However, in July 1996, Tylo was controversially fired from Melrose Place on the grounds of being pregnant and was replaced by Lisa Rinna. In response, she sued that show's executive producer Aaron Spelling and Spelling Productions for millions of US dollars, and won her case. It was immediately reported that she would return to The Bold and the Beautiful, with head writer and executive producer Bradley Bell issuing the statement: "I am certain that Hunter's talent and ability will continue to be an asset to the show."

In October 2001, reports surfaced that Tylo was to exit the series again following unsuccessful contract negotiations, although two months later in December she signed a new contract which gave her more flexibility to pursue other projects. In October 2002, Bradley Bell killed off the character and Tylo's last appearance was on October 30, 2002. In March 2004, she made a multiple-episode guest appearance as Taylor's ghost. Following this, she told Soaps in Depth that "I knew it my heart I would not be going back", stating that she wanted to "let the character go". During her time off the show, she had turned down offers to appear on other soaps including As the World Turns. In 2005, Deanna Barnert of Soap Opera Digest wrote that according to an industry insider, a character from the show "may come back from the world of the beyond", leading fans to speculate whether either Macy Alexander (Bobbie Eakes) or Taylor would be returning. Taylor was revealed to be alive, with Tylo returning on-screen during the April 25, 2005, episode. She was said to be "having fun surprising her castmates" with her reappearance on set. The show's producers wanted to keep her on-screen return a secret, with Tylo wearing a wig when travelling to the set, and the character's name being changed on scripts.

In May 2013, Tylo announced online that she was exiting the soap, possibly for good. In a post on her website, she wrote: "For me, contract talks ended 4 weeks ago", adding "My friends and B&B fans will be sorely missed." Tylo's final appearance aired on her birthday: July 3, 2013. Dan Kroll of the website Soap Central was shocked by her exit, though felt that a future return was possible, judging from her previous departures. The news of Tylo's exit came just months after the high-profile departures of Ronn Moss and Susan Flannery from the series. Tylo has since returned to The Bold and the Beautiful for a number of guest appearances. She made a one-episode appearance which aired on February 28, 2014. The actress then made several guest appearances in April and May 2014, for a May sweeps story arc which revisited Taylor's accidental killing of Darla years earlier, with Darla's now teen daughter Aly (Ashlyn Pearce) struggling to deal with the issue of her mother's death. Tylo appeared again on November 5, 12 and 24, 2014. Tylo made a surprise return to The Bold and the Beautiful during the final moments of the April 12, 2018, episode. Tylo said her return was "so out of the blue" and revealed that it was kept secret: "They had me hidden away...I had a code name...They kept it quiet from everybody."

Entertainment Weekly exclusively announced on October 27, 2021, that the role of Taylor has been recast with Krista Allen. The series had reportedly reached out to Tylo to return, but she was unavailable. Tylo later disclosed that she chose not to return after 2019 due to her dissatisfaction with the writing for Taylor. Allen, who previously played Billie Reed on the soap opera Days of Our Lives, said: "If there was ever any type of role to come back to daytime with, it would be this one. I couldn’t have asked for a better role to step into — or bigger shoes to fill. I love a good challenge." Allen wore a wig when auditioning for the role, explaining that she wanted to "lock in the look of Taylor Hayes as best I could", and prepared by watching Tylo's last episodes. Allen began filming on October 28, 2021, and made her first appearance on December 10. In an exclusive interview with Deadline Hollywood published on December 15, 2023, Allen revealed in October of the same year she was notified she had been dismissed from the role, with her last appearance on the show being on November 10.

On August 6, 2024, Rebecca Budig debuted in the role. Speaking to People of her casting, Budig stated: "I just hope they're open to that idea and interpretation of it and that they just believe the relationships between Taylor and Ridge and Taylor and Brooke."

== Character development ==
=== Characterization ===
A promotional still of Taylor (Tylo) during her first episode in 1990.

Taylor is a globally renowned psychiatrist and works at the UCLA Medical Center. When she debuted, the character emerged as the "good girl" alongside other female characters, but still had a strong demeanor. Network Ten writes: "This Freudian Doc always seems to lose out to Brooke when it comes to matters of the heart. Taylor is as sophisticated and intelligent as they come, always able to analyze the problems of others, and sometimes even her own." The writers wanted Taylor to retain a "pristine" and "well-mannered" personality, according to Tylo, to contrast her from rival Brooke Logan (Katherine Kelly Lang) who was "feisty and reckless", the different facets which attracted Ridge to each of them. However, Tylo criticized a storyline in 2000 where Ridge is tricked into sleeping with his mentally unstable high school lover Morgan DeWitt (Sarah G. Buxton), who becomes pregnant with his child. She said: "I just wish that Taylor would get a clue, period! I wish that her psychiatric expertise would kick in already. I mean, she's retarded!", also observing that the character can be absentminded.

In the years following Taylor's 2005 return, her storylines changed significantly. After Ridge leaves Taylor, she becomes depressed and struggles with alcoholism. Tylo explained how this affected the character: "The love of her life throws her away after she struggled so hard to come back to him. It was painful and humiliating. That made her more real and now, after everything she's been through, Taylor gets to be a little manipulative spiteful and even resentful." Taylor, who is usually resilient, falls into a tailspin: accidentally killing Darla Forrester (Schae Harrison) in a hit and run accident and lying about it, later being arrested for driving under the influence. Tylo confessed, "These were the kinds of stories I was begging for", as she thought "it was very believable". The actress also wanted to portray Taylor as less "serious".

"In many ways, when she is not being kidnapped and chained to a stair railing, or trapped in a cabin in sub-zero temperatures, about to die, she is the most sane person on the show. She is a very fun character to play. They took her off her saintly pedestal. She is less self-sacrificing, which was usually to her detriment."

— Tylo on Taylor's development (2007)

Taylor often loses out to Brooke, as Thorne (Ridge's brother) loses out to Ridge. When asked in 2011 where she would like her storyline to go, Tylo said: "I think we should see Thorne and Taylor get strong and stand up to these people who mowed them down." In March 2012, Tylo said that Taylor is finally learning to pursue what she wants instead of always putting others first. She said, "In psychology, they tell you to be true to yourself. Maybe she is finally doing that, even though in her moral compass she knows that it is better to put other people first. She has been going after what she wants instead. It is a very good growing place for Taylor to go back to reality and realize that she is not perfect and that she needs to try not looking so perfect so much."

Between 2014 and 2018, the character was off-screen, said to be living in Paris, where Tylo felt that she was "declining", noting: "I think with all she’s been through, she would probably have no choice but to deteriorate." Reflecting on Taylor being revealed as Bill Spencer Jr.'s (Don Diamont) shooter, Tylo loved "the idea of a crazy psychiatrist", "I’ve always said that Taylor is the good doc who can’t take her medicine; that’s how I’ve always described her, and this story just gives her so many things to do."

=== Relationships ===
==== Ridge Forrester ====
Taylor (Tylo) and Ridge (Moss) on their wedding day (1992).

Taylor's major love interest is Ridge Forrester (Ronn Moss). The couple faces challenges at first, such as interference from their respective exes, Brooke Logan (Katherine Kelly Lang) and Blake Hayes (Peter Brown), and Ridge's mother, Stephanie Forrester (Susan Flannery), initially disliking Taylor. By July 1991, John Goudas of The Gadsden Times wrote that Taylor was "hooked" by Ridge but was "no-nonsense". Taylor refuses to marry Ridge unless he was serious about the end of his relationship with Brooke; Goudas noted that Taylor wanted "insurance" and deemed her "upfront" approach as the "polar opposite" to that of Brooke. Ridge and Taylor ultimately marry in 1992. The actors were under pressure during the shooting of the wedding as it was filmed on the day of the Rodney King riots in Los Angeles.

The love triangle between Taylor, Ridge and Brooke continued into Ridge and Taylor's first marriage. When Brooke has Ridge's child, Bridget Forrester (Ashley Jones), Taylor helps raise the baby (although it was later revealed in 1996 that Bridget was fathered by Ridge's father Eric, not him). Speaking on Ridge's decision to remain married to Taylor, Tylo said that the actors were "so sick of this triangle" and revealed: "One of the things Bradley's going to do is have Ridge pick Taylor over Brooke. For a change, instead of women breaking couples up or getting pregnant to trap a man, we're going to see how couples work through their problems." After Taylor is presumed dead in a plane crash in 1994 only to return months later, Tylo felt that Taylor would be feeling "quite cheated" by Ridge marrying Brooke, and joked that "Taylor wasn't even cold yet". Ridge and Taylor divorce, although soon become involved once more, and get back together when Ridge finds out that he fathered Taylor's son, Thomas Forrester (Adam Gregory). Ridge and Taylor remarry on June 24, 1998.

Despite Ridge and Taylor's remarriage, Brooke continues her attempts at winning Ridge back. Stephanie encourages Taylor to see Brooke's intent, with Tylo observing: "It was so obvious she was going after Ridge. How can you explain away that she always kept ending up in the elevator in her bra and underwear over and over again? Stephanie’s whole mission was to get Taylor to smell the coffee and [realize] that not everybody has as altruistic an agenda as she does." Ridge and Taylor's twins, Stephanie ("Steffy") and Phoebe, are born in 1999. During the pregnancy Taylor experiences tuberculosis after interacting with a man who has it. Her pregnancy becomes high risk and she refuses treatment to protect the babies. Tylo said that this was "a great way to bring awareness about the disease and the threat it poses to pregnant women".

When Taylor dies in 2002, supervising producer Rhonda Friedman noted that Ridge refuses to accept the "horrible reality", saying: "He begs Taylor to come back to him. He just doesn't want to let go of this woman who he has loved for so many years, someone he say himself growing old with." Devin Owens of Soap Opera Digest called Taylor Ridge's soulmate. Taylor's "ghost" visits Ridge in 2004 and encourages him to be with Brooke. Following Taylor's return to the show, her marriage to Ridge fell apart in 2006 and they divorce. They have since reunited on several occasions but he continues going back to Brooke, despite Taylor's efforts to thwart this from happening. Daytime Confidential's Jamey Giddens noted that Steffy and Thomas "grew up watching their daddy basically climb out of their mom's bed and right into the sack with Rick (Jacob Young) and Hope's (Kimberly Matula) mom, over and over again."

==== Other relationships ====
Taylor has been romantically linked to Ridge's half-brother Thorne (Winsor Harmon) multiple times. They were briefly involved from 1997 to 1998, when Ridge is in jail and urges Taylor to forget about him. Taylor also briefly lies about Thorne being Thomas' father. After accidentally killing Thorne's wife Darla in 2006, Taylor falls in love with Thorne, who is "forgiving and loving" towards her, even helping her attend AA. They nearly marry, but split up due to his then 4-year-old daughter Alexandria Forrester learning that Taylor killed Darla. Of working with Tylo, Harmon said, "I am so comfortable with Hunter. We have that [comfort] around each other, and when that happens as an artist, you are allowed to open up more and there is more spontaneity."

Thorne and Taylor later become involved again in 2011, when they team up against the Forresters for mistreating them. Tylo said: "[Taylor] probably equally feels that Thorne deserves to have a shot at Forrester in the driver's seat. Taylor does not like the way Brooke has been running everything through Ridge." However, Tylo saw that there was a "sticky point" between them because of Darla, and noted that Taylor "would do anything to make up for that". The actress said, "I think it's very cool that there is so much history behind the two characters. First of all, it does not seem like a sexually based relationship. So I think the audience can appreciate it and go, 'Wow. I can understand these two emotionally bonding,' and then let it grow into something that doesn't look forced."

In 2008, Taylor becomes involved with Brooke's son, the much younger Rick Forrester (Kyle Lowder), who was previously in a relationship with Phoebe. Lowder described playing the storyline as "challenging" and one that "stirs the pot". It began after Tylo and Lowder were tested for chemistry in scenes. When the news of Rick and Taylor becoming closer reaches Brooke and Ridge, they both protest against it; Tylo described this as "two pots calling the kettle black". Brooke accuses Taylor of being with Rick as a form of revenge against her, and enlists Phoebe's help in stopping the relationship. Tylo told Soap Opera Digest that Taylor's revenge is "a subconscious thing", explaining: "Taylor sort of feels like Brooke stole her child, so this is kind of retribution. Taylor is like, 'Well then I'll take your kid'." Phoebe accepts Rick and Taylor being together, wanting both of them to be happy and giving Taylor the "green light she was looking for". Lowder believed that the tables were turning on Brooke, and said "now Brooke's son is in love with [Taylor], and she's in love with him – and it's legit (...) Taylor wins, Brooke loses – and Brooke's going crazy". Rick and Taylor get engaged but she ends the relationship due to her feelings for Ridge.

Taylor becomes involved with Whipple "Whip" Jones III (Rick Hearst) through internet dating, in 2009. Tommy Garret of Canyon News said that Whip and Taylor's "chemistry is magnificent". Whip was previously involved with Brooke; Garret wrote: "Now he's in love with Brooke's mortal enemy Taylor Hayes Forrester... Hearst is magnificently suited for the role and fans want to see Whip and Taylor find happiness. At least for a few months." Of their romance, Tylo said: "I think Taylor has found true love with Whip. I think if she was a smart psychiatrist, and able to apply her knowledge in her own world, she would be with Whip. She would know this is a healthy relationship. But Taylor doesn’t see it. She still wants to fix people." Taylor and Whip marry in April 2010. Whip becomes jealous when Taylor admits to Stephanie that she still has feelings for Ridge. Whip's frustration with Taylor's feelings for Ridge leads to the demise of their relationship the following year, and they end the marriage.

=== Rivalry with Brooke ===
Beginning in 1990, Brooke (Katherine Kelly Lang) and Taylor would fight over Ridge's affection for years. In 2013, Tylo revealed that she and Lang would distance themselves from each other to make their on-screen rivalry convincing, explaining, "We cannot look comfortable with each other. We need to look like we are in a place of competition."

In 2010, Lang and Tylo recreated a 1983 lily pond cat-fight between Krystle Carrington and Alexis Colby in the drama Dynasty, shooting the scenes in a koi pond at the CBS Studios. Tommy Garrett of Canyon News said the "two Mrs. Ridge Forresters" had escalated to "all out war". After Stephanie's death, Taylor and Brooke's animosity against one another reignites as Taylor grows closer to Eric in 2013. Tylo said that "When Brooke and Taylor go at it, it really gets a lot of people wound up. I said this brings the show around full circle with everything Stephanie was fighting for, and now the battle has been set for these two to really go at it." In 2018, Brooke and Taylor engage in a food fight at Hope Logan's (Annika Noelle) wedding to Liam Spencer (Scott Clifton), Steffy's ex-husband. Tylo stated, "In the past, Taylor's tried to play into Brooke's psychology to find any kind of guilty conscious (...) Now, Taylor realizes Brooke doesn't have one! There's no trying to get to her because she doesn't listen to reason. Taylor's been letting stuff sit and stew for years. She's not happy and, now, she's got to vent!"

==== Baby Jack ====
In 2007, Brooke and Taylor's rivalry intensified when Brooke begins pursuing Nick Marone (Jack Wagner) while he is married to Taylor. Soap Opera Digest noted that the women were "crossing swords once again for the same man". Tylo observed that both Brooke and Taylor were being written with "more intelligence" this time around, and was happy in revisiting the rivalry between them as "long as it wasn't over Ridge" again. Taylor becomes pregnant with Nick's child through In vitro fertilisation (IVF), having struggled to conceive a child, and gives birth to Jack Marone. However, because of a mistake that Bridget had made in the lab, it was Brooke's eggs which were implanted in Taylor and not the donor's; making Brooke Jack's biological mother. She fears that her baby will be drawn to Brooke. Taylor begins drinking and becomes mentally unstable, with her parental rights being taken away. The scenes where Taylor loses custody and suffers a breakdown in court were filmed shortly after Tylo's own son died. Tylo told On-Air On-Soaps: "I got a lot of emails from people worrying. They would go from worrying about me to saying, 'Was I okay with those scenes and after them?'" The actress said that she tapped into her own tragedy when portraying those scenes, and allowed herself to feel the "feeling that will never go away which is, 'It's not fair'". Taylor is soon awarded joint custody of Jack when she passes a mental health evaluation. However, she cannot bond with him and ends up giving Jack to Brooke in the end.

=== Departure (2002) ===
In October 2002, it was announced that Bradley Bell had decided to kill off Taylor, and Tylo would depart the role after twelve years. In a statement on her website, she wrote: "It is with great sadness I have to tell you that Brad has decided to kill off the character Taylor. He feels the character is too good and has too much integrity to take her down other paths—in a word, played out." The actress confessed that she was unhappy with her character's direction at the time of her exit, saying: "I really felt like Taylor had lost the wind from her sails and was going nowhere." Tylo said that "It just seemed like everything had to do with whether or not there was a woman after her husband" and that she was "done with it", revealing that her unhappiness with the writing began when the character of Morgan appeared on the show. Furthermore, both Tylo and Bell agreed that Taylor was at a "brick wall", but Bell was "afraid to go beyond that" and have the character go "off the deep end", in fear of destroying her integrity. However, Tylo believed that "in reality that's what she needed – to be more human. But she just got boring instead". Tylo added: "Taylor either needed to die or she needed to go berserk and lose her mind or something, which I think would have made a lot of people mad." Taylor is gunned down by Sheila Carter (Kimberlin Brown) and, despite undergoing surgery, she dies in Ridge's arms due to her injuries. Tylo eventually returned to the soap, with Taylor revealed to be alive in 2005.

== Storylines ==
=== 1990–2002 ===
Her father is Jack Hamilton (Chris Robinson), and she has a younger brother, Zachary. Taylor's mother, Sharon, died when she was a child which led to Jack's gambling addiction. Her chaotic childhood led to Taylor becoming a psychiatrist. She was in an abusive relationship with Blake Hayes (Peter Brown) who also stalked her.

Taylor begins counseling Ridge Forrester (Ronn Moss) and his wife Caroline Spencer Forrester (Joanna Johnson) when Caroline is diagnosed with leukemia. After Caroline's death, Ridge takes interest in Taylor, to the dismay of his ex Brooke Logan (Katherine Kelly Lang). Storm (Brian Patrick Clarke) and Taylor briefly date and he proposes to her at Christmas 1990 but she refuses. Ridge and Taylor begin a relationship which is temporarily broken up by Brooke; Ridge follows Taylor to St. Thomas Island and successfully wins her back. The couple marry in 1992; Taylor befriends Ridge's overprotective mother Stephanie Forrester (Susan Flannery). In 1993 while trapped in a cabin at Big Bear and suffering from hypothermia, Taylor sleeps with her mentor from medical school James Warwick (Ian Buchanan) to prevent him from dying a virgin. A guilty Taylor writes Ridge a note confessing her infidelity, but she is presumed dead after a plane crash in April 1994. Stephanie destroys Taylor's letter, and Ridge eventually remarries Brooke. However, Taylor is revealed to be alive and suffering from amnesia. She was assaulted by drug dealers who took her place on the plane. She is rescued by Prince Omar Rashid (Kabir Bedi) and taken to his palace in Morocco. Omar holds Taylor captive when she regains her memories; she lives under the alias Princess Laila and is coerced into marrying Omar, effectively committing bigamy (the marriage was declared void). Taylor ultimately returns to California. She poses as a British nurse taking care of a temporarily blinded Ridge before revealing herself to family and friends in May 1995. Ridge and Taylor's marriage ends shortly afterward and he decides to remain with Brooke.

In 1997, Taylor discovers that she is pregnant with Ridge's child. Mistakenly believing that he wants Brooke, she allows Ridge's half-brother Thorne Forrester (Winsor Harmon) to claim he is the father instead. After Taylor gives birth to Thomas Forrester in 1998, Ridge learns the truth and they remarry. In 1999, Taylor gives birth to twins Steffy and Phoebe Forrester, and suffers from tuberculosis during the pregnancy. Ridge's unstable high school ex Morgan DeWitt (Sarah Buxton) becomes pregnant with his child in 2000, but the baby dies after Morgan falls off a balcony in Taylor's mansion. Morgan kidnaps Steffy during a family vacation and she is presumed dead. The truth is revealed and Morgan is jailed for her crimes, after kidnapping both Steffy and Taylor. In 2002, Taylor discovers that Sheila Carter (Kimberlin Brown) who is criminally insane has broken out of jail. She tries to warn Eric, but instead is shot by Sheila while shielding Brooke. Taylor survives emergency surgery but dies in Ridge's arms due to heart failure.

=== 2004–2014 ===
In 2004, an apparition of Taylor appears to Ridge, Brooke and Jackie Marone (Lesley-Anne Down). In 2005, Taylor re-appears at Bridget Forrester (Ashley Jones) and Nick Marone's (Jack Wagner) wedding ceremony and is soon revealed to be alive. She had been removed from the hospital by Prince Omar after her apparent death and was kept alive in a coma before waking up. Taylor learns that Ridge is now married to Brooke and they share a son together. Ridge cannot decide between the two women, but after Stephanie fakes a heart attack and convinces him to choose Taylor, they renew their vows. Stephanie's lie is revealed; Taylor and Ridge work on their marriage, but after she kisses Hector Ramirez (Lorenzo Lamas) and confesses her infidelity with James Warwick years ago to Ridge, they divorce. Taylor becomes an alcoholic and while driving one night to Phoebe who is stranded on PCH, she accidentally hits Thorne's wife Darla Forrester (Schae Harrison) with her car. Darla dies from her injuries. Taylor bonds with Thorne and his daughter Aly, and they become involved. Taylor confesses the truth about Darla's accident and is sent to prison but is later released due to her death being accidental. Thorne and Taylor break off their engagement and she begins a relationship with sailor Nick Marone (Jack Wagner); they marry and she becomes pregnant with his child through in vitro fertilization. However, after the birth of their son Jack Marone, it is revealed through a lab mix up that Brooke's eggs were implanted in Taylor. After overcoming alcoholism and depression again, Taylor starts a romantic relationship with Brooke's son Rick Forrester (Kyle Lowder). She divorces Nick and decides to hand Jack over to Brooke. Taylor leaves Rick due to her feelings for Ridge. In late 2008, Phoebe (MacKenzie Mauzy) is killed in a car accident, where Rick had been driving.

When Rick becomes involved with Steffy (Jacqueline MacInnes Wood) in 2009, Ridge experiences anxiety and sleeps with Taylor after consuming pills. Ridge leaves Brooke and nearly marries Taylor, but returns to Brooke shortly after. In 2010, Taylor marries Whipple Jones III (Rick Hearst). That year, she purchases 25% of Forrester Creations worth $50 million, and when Steffy is fired by Ridge, Taylor signs over these shares to her daughter. In 2011, Whip and Taylor's marriage ends when he realizes she still loves Ridge. Stephanie and Thomas lie about Thomas sleeping with Brooke on an island they were stranded on. As a result, Ridge and Taylor get back together and make it to the altar, but Stephanie confesses the truth, and Ridge reunites with Brooke. Taylor later begins romancing Thorne again, and exerts her power as trustee of Forrester Creations. In 2012, Taylor counsels Brooke's sister Katie Logan Spencer (Heather Tom) who is suffering from postnatal depression. Taylor says goodbye to best friend Stephanie before she dies from lung cancer.

In 2013, Thomas loses out on the top position at Forrester Creations to Rick and wants to leave town; Taylor persuades Eric Forrester (John McCook) to help Thomas. Soon, Taylor and Eric become romantically involved and she moves into the Forrester mansion. Taylor discovers that Brooke slept with Katie's husband Bill Spencer Jr. (Don Diamont) which resulted in a pregnancy (and miscarriage). Taylor reveals Brooke's secret at her birthday party in front of everyone, and abruptly leaves town afterward. In 2014, Taylor is now living Paris and has reunited with Thorne. The couple return to Los Angeles, but Aly (Ashlyn Pearce), now a teenager, heavily disapproves. Aly forgives Taylor for Darla's death and Taylor and Thorne return to Paris. After few months, Taylor returns to Los Angeles to visit some patients and tells Eric that she and Thorne broke up. Eric asks her to stay in Los Angeles, telling her that LA is the place where she has to live, but she refuses and returns to Paris. Before her leaving, Eric kisses Taylor on her cheek, still showing some feelings for her.

=== 2018–2019 ===
In April 2018, Taylor returns to Los Angeles, where she confronts Bill for taking advantage of Steffy and accuses him of displaying predatory behaviors. During the confrontation, Taylor confesses to shooting Bill and once again pulls a gun on him in a fit of emotional distress. Bill agrees not to press charges against her for Steffy's sake, and Taylor remains in Los Angeles to seek psychiatric help off-screen. Liam, Hope, Brooke and Ridge soon learn that Taylor was Bill's shooter, with Brooke and Hope reluctantly agreeing to keep the secret. Taylor eventually moves in with Steffy and her granddaughter, Kelly. Taylor leaves town again in 2019, with it later being stated that she is doing missionary work overseas.

=== 2021–2023 ===
Taylor (Krista Allen) returns to Los Angeles after a series of travels overseas to surprise her daughter, Steffy in her residence in December 2021.

== Reception ==
=== Character and portrayal ===
The role of Taylor is considered iconic, and after three years on the series, Taylor was regarded as a fan favorite among viewers. Marla Hart of the Chicago Tribune stated that she fit in well with the show's "signature glamor casting". Discussing Tylo's 1994 temporary exit, Kathleen Sloan of the Toronto Star observed that "fans of the soap couldn't have been more open-mouthed" over the matter. In 2004, Soaps in Depth called Taylor "daytime's sexiest shrink". Tommy Garret of Canyon News described Taylor as being the "epitome of grace and dignity". News24 chose Taylor returning from the dead twice as one of its favorite storylines on The Bold and the Beautiful, though TheWrap's Jennifer Maas wrote: "Taylor died and came back to life twice and both incidents involved the same Moroccan prince. Look, we get that it's a soap opera, but even that was a bit much." In 2008, Darren Lomas from Daytime Confidential wrote, "The back-from-death version of Taylor is a whole lot more horny than she was back in the day. Is it all because she never got over Ridge, her one true love?" Chris Eades of CBS Soaps in Depth noted that "Fans were absolutely stunned" by the "all-too-rare surprise" of Taylor's 2018 return, writing: "With Steffy in desperate need of support, it was the perfect time for Taylor to return to town and offer her daughter some help."

Discussing Tylo's portrayal, Debashine Thangevelo of Independent Online observed, "Having inhabited this role for almost two decades, barring a sabbatical, she has made an indelible impression on viewers." Reacting to Taylor being revealed as Bill's shooter, Canyon News wrote: "Tylo delivered some riveting scenes, as a mother concerned about her daughter’s well-being", stating that her return "causes all types of problems which make for interesting TV". For her portrayal of Taylor, Tylo was nominated twice for Hottest Female Star at the Soap Opera Digest Awards. Tylo also won a Soap Opera Update MVP Award for Best Actress, and a Telvis Award for Foreign Female TV Performer (Finnish: Ulkomainen naisesiintyjä) in 2002 for the role.

Following the character's 2019 exit, Maas observed that fans had "been clamoring for Taylor’s return for years, as important moments in her children’s lives went by with their mother noticeably absent — and without a great explanation as to why." In 2021, after the role was recast with Allen, Lynette Rice of Entertainment Weekly described the news as "sweet relief" for Forrester fans, adding that Allen "fills the very big stilettos left behind" by Tylo. Soap Opera Digest described the recast as "shocking" and a "big-time grab".

In 2022, Charlie Mason from Soaps She Knows placed Taylor at 11th on his ranked list of The Bold and the Beautiful's Best of the Best Characters Ever, commenting that "For decades, we liked Hunter Tylo's shrink as a heroine who always got the short end of the stick. But we've come to love her as the woman scorned who, if she hasn't completely lost her marbles, has certainly misplaced some of 'em!"

In 2024, Soap Opera News named Budig's casting as Taylor as their fifth top recast of the year. Michael Fairman named Buding's casting in the role as his "Most Shocking Recast" for his "Best and Worst in Soaps 2024" listing. He pointed out how "perplexed" fans were at the news, while also noting how she "didn't look old enough" to play a mother opposite Wood's Steffy. Ultimately, Fairman complimented Budig's work in the role: "Budig, as she always has done, is doing her best with the material given to her as she works to establish the on-screen relationships with Taylor's romantic and familial ties and past."

=== Romance ===
Widely famed, the triangle between Brooke, Ridge and Taylor is viewed as one of the soap opera genre's biggest storylines. In 1991, John Goudas of The Gadsden Times felt that "So far, Taylor has viewer sympathy" in the triangle, but also wrote: "we don't see Dr. Taylor Hayes do much practicing, or ever see her making hospital rounds. Air time means time with Ridge or with ex-husband Blake. So much for medicine." Darren Lomas noted that the "Taylor and Brooke wars have lasted for two decades. Even when Taylor was taking a dirt nap, fan messageboards still buzzed with Taylor and Brooke fans taking swipes at each other." Tommy Garrett recognized Brooke and Taylor the queen of soap opera cat-fights and noted that "at least half of the show's fans" had supported Taylor in the love triangle. Speaking of Brooke and Taylor's anticipated cake fight in 2018, Soaps.com writer Candace Young stated that viewers "weren't disappointed", calling it "re-energizing to see these two pick up with their rivalry and play off one another."

Ridge and Taylor are considered a soap opera supercouple and are referred to by the portmanteau "Tridge" on social media. Speaking on the beginning of the relationship, Michael Idato of The Sydney Morning Herald wrote, "Taylor was Caroline's doctor, which made her affair with Ridge, as the bleep bleep machine was flatlining, slightly inappropriate. But then, nothing in daytime soap opera is ever appropriate." Their 1992 wedding was ranked at number 18 by The Huffington Post on a list of the "Top 20 Most Memorable Soap Weddings of All Time". Michael Fairman referred to Taylor and Thorne as "the screwed-over couple of B&B".
