= Sherilyn Wolter =

American former actress (born 1951)

- Wolter in General Hospital (1987)
- Born: November 30, 1951 (age 74); Clarksburg, West Virginia, U.S.
- Occupation: Actress
- Years active: 1981–1994

Sherilyn Marjorie Wolter (born November 30, 1951) is an American former actress.

== Early life ==
Wolter was born in Clarksburg, West Virginia. She graduated from Encina High School in Sacramento, California, 1969.

== Career ==
Wolter starred on the TV series B. J. and the Bear in 1981, and then portrayed Celia Quartermaine on the daytime soap opera General Hospital from March 17, 1983, to February 26, 1986, and Elena Nikolas on Santa Barbara in 1987. She also briefly replaced Hunter Tylo as Taylor Hayes in The Bold and the Beautiful in 1990 and appeared as George on Guiding Light in 1993. Wolter played a blinded artist in the 1989 film Eyewitness to Murder, Mitch's girlfriend in the first season of Baywatch (1990), and Justine Strickland in the 1992 miniseries Judith Krantz's Secrets.

== Filmography ==
=== Film ===
Year	Title	Role	Notes
1989	Eyewitness to Murder	Suzanne	

=== Television ===
Year	Title	Role	Notes
1981	B. J. and the Bear	Cindy Grant	15 episodes
1982	The Juggler of Notre Dame	Beatrice	Television film
1983	The A-Team	Carolyn Coulton	Episode: "Children of Jamestown"
1983–1986	General Hospital	Celia Quartermaine	71 episodes
1986	My Sister Sam	Heather	Episode: "Mirror, Mirror on the Wall"
1987	Santa Barbara	Eleanor/Elena Nikolas	72 episodes
1987, 1993	Matlock	Judy Wilson / Whitney Seaver	2 episodes
1989	Father Dowling Mysteries	Marcella Woolridge	Episode: "What Do You Call a Call Girl Mystery"
1990	Who's the Boss?	Michelle	Episode: "Dear Landlord"
1990	Baywatch	Amanda / Ms. Keller	3 episodes
1990	The Bold and the Beautiful	Dr. Taylor Hayes	6 episodes
1992	Civil Wars	Elise Mosley	Episode: "Shop 'Til You Drop"
1992	Secrets	Justine Strickland	2 episodes
1993	In the Heat of the Night	Councilwoman Roslyn Douglas	Episode: "Judgement Day"
1994	Monty	TV Wife	Episode: "Baby Talk"
