= John Castellanos =

American actor

John Castellanos (born April 11, 1957, in La Mesa, California) is an American actor best known for the contract role of attorney John Silva on the CBS soap opera The Young and the Restless. He joined the cast in May 1989 and has appeared in an estimated 1,300 episodes. He had previously portrayed attorney Jeff Talon on The Bold and the Beautiful in several episodes in 1987.

== Career ==
Castellanos has also made guest appearances in such primetime series as Miami Vice, Babylon 5, Silk Stalkings, JAG, and Supernatural. He has also appeared in feature films K-9, with Jim Belushi, Killer Weekend with Eric Roberts, 10 Years, Blue Eyes, and Mexican Gold.

He has produced the feature films The Man Who Came Back, with Eric Braeden, Billy Zane, and Armand Assante; Blue Eyes with Burton Gilliam; and Mexican Gold with Lorenzo Lamas.

He attended Grossmont College in San Diego, California and San Diego State University. He is a graduate of the American Conservatory Theater (ACT).

An accomplished Shakespearean actor, he worked for many years in some of the finest Shakespearean companies in the U.S.

== Personal life ==
He is divorced from Rhonda Friedman, supervising producer of The Bold and the Beautiful.

He enjoys playing golf, traveling, woodwork, writing and storytelling. He is active with a number of charitable organizations.
