= Jeff Trachta =

American actor and singer

Jeff Trachta (born October 6, 1960, in Staten Island, New York) is an American actor and singer, best known for portraying Thorne Forrester on the soap opera The Bold and the Beautiful from 1989 to 1996. He was the second of four actors to play this role; he was preceded by Clayton Norcross and succeeded by Winsor Harmon. In June 2008, Trachta was seen performing on the Holland America ship, M.S. Amsterdam heading to Alaska. He appeared in the twelfth season of America's Got Talent as "The Singing Trump", impersonating President Donald Trump. He advanced past auditions receiving three "yes" votes from the judges. However, he was eliminated in the quarterfinals.
