= Ashlyn Pearce =

American actress (born 1994)

- Born: July 8, 1994 (age 30); Mill Creek, Washington U.S.
- Occupation: Actress
- Years active: 2011–present
- Height: 1.73 m (5 ft 8 in)
- Relatives: Lisa Pearce (mother); Taryn Pearce (sister)

Ashlyn Pearce (born July 8, 1994) is an American actress known for playing Alexandria Forrester on the CBS daytime soap The Bold and the Beautiful. Pearce joined the cast of Bold and the Beautiful in 2013 and exited the series in 2015.

== Filmography ==
Year	Title	Role	Notes
2013–2015	The Bold and the Beautiful	Alexandria Forrester	
2016	Salem	Alice	
2016	5150	Autumn	
2019	Deadly Switch	Camilla	TV movie

== Awards and nominations ==
List of acting awards and nominations
Year	Award	Category	Title	Result	Ref.
2016	Daytime Emmy Award	Outstanding Younger Actress in a Drama Series	The Bold and the Beautiful	Nominated	
