= Rick Hearst =

American actor (born 1965)

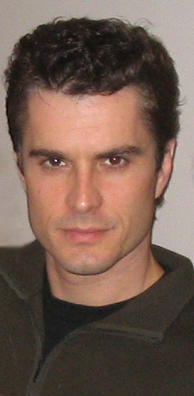
- Born: Richard Charles Herbst; January 4, 1965 (age 61); Howard Beach, Queens, New York, U.S.
- Years active: 1988–present
- Spouse: Donna Smoot (m. 1990)
- Children: 2

Rick Hearst (born January 4, 1965) is an American actor. He is known for roles on Days of Our Lives as Scott "Scotty" Banning II, Guiding Light as Alan-Michael Spaulding, The Young and the Restless as Matt Clark, The Bold and the Beautiful as Whipple "Whip" Jones III, and General Hospital as Ric Lansing.

== Career ==
His first film was Brain Damage, directed by Frank Henenlotter. He has appeared in Days of Our Lives (1989–1990) as Scott "Scotty" Banning II, Guiding Light (1990–1996) as Alan-Michael Spaulding and The Young and the Restless (2000–2001) as Matt Clark. In January 2002, it was announced Hearst had joined the cast of The Bold and the Beautiful as Whip Jones; he made his first appearance on February 13 of the same year. In October of the same year, reports announced Hearst's exit from the role; that same month, it was announced Hearst was cast as Ric Lansing on ABC's General Hospital, making his first appearance on November 8, 2002. In November 2005, he signed on for three additional years in the role. In July 2008, following online speculation of his impending exit, Hearst assured fans it was his intention to continue his work in the role; two months later, Hearst re-signed with the serial again to remain in the role "for the foreseeable future". In April 2009, Hearst was demoted to recurring status; he remained in the role until the following month, when it was announced he would return to The Bold and the Beautiful. In May 2011, Hearst was dropped to recurring status and made his final appearance in the role June 17.

In January 2014, it was announced Hearst would reprise the role of Ric on General Hospital, returning during the February 24 episode. He exited the role in 2016. Following his exit, Hearst made episodic appearances on primetime soaps, such as Dynasty in 2018 and Ambitions in 2019.

In July 2024, it was announced Hearst would again reprise the role of Ric on General Hospital. His first day back on-set was July 29, with Ric's return airing on August 22, 2024. He will serve as series announcer on the audio drama Montecito, beginning April 22, 2025.

Hearst also had a recurring guest-star role on Beverly Hills, 90210, and has guest-starred on other TV series such as Jenny and Pacific Blue. In 2000, he starred as "Rocky" in the theater production of Aven'U Boys with Danica McKellar.

Hearst has been nominated for a Daytime Emmy Award seven times, winning for "Outstanding Supporting Actor in a Drama Series" in 2004 and 2007 for his General Hospital role, after previously winning "Outstanding Younger Actor in a Drama Series" for Guiding Light in 1991. He has also been nominated for four Soap Opera Digest Awards, winning "Outstanding Villain" for The Young and the Restless in 2001. In 2005, Hearst filmed the lead role in Carpool Guy, directed by Corbin Bernsen.

== Personal life ==
Hearst has been married to wife Donna Smoot since 1990. They share two sons, born in 1992 and 1995.

== Filmography ==
Year	Title	Role	Other notes
1988	Brain Damage	Brian	
1989	Crossing the Line	Rick Kagan	
1989	Days of Our Lives	Scott "Scotty" Banning II #3	1989–90
1990	Guiding Light	Alan-Michael Spaulding #2	1990–96
1997	Beverly Hills, 90210	Alan Black	3 episodes
1997	Alright Already	Frame Designer	1 episode
1997	Jenny	Zak	1 episode
1998	Maggie Winters	Lance Rubacky	
1998	Pacific Blue	Frank Kovac	2 episodes; 1998-90
2000	Charmed	Troxa	1 episode
2001	The Young and the Restless	Matt Clark	2000-01
2001	Dead Sexy	Bellhop	as Richard Hearst
2002	General Hospital	Ric Lansing	2002–09; 2014–16, 2024-present
2002	The Bold and the Beautiful	Whipple "Whip" Jones III	2002; 2009–11
2003	SoapTalk	Himself	Guest appearance
2003	The View	Himself	Guest appearance
2003	Pyramid	Himself	Guest appearance
2004	1 Day with...	Himself	Guest appearance
2004	The Oprah Winfrey Show	Himself	Guest appearance
2004	The Wayne Brady Show	Himself	Guest appearance
2004	The 31st Annual Daytime Emmy Awards	Himself	
2005	The 32nd Annual Daytime Emmy Awards	Himself	Presenter
2005	Carpool Guy	Joel	
2010	Castle	Dr. Elliot Lefcourt	308: Murder Most Fowl
2017	Daytime Divas	Ted Windsor	4 episodes
2018	Dynasty	Senator Paul Daniels	Guest appearance
