= Katherine Kelly Lang =

American actress

- Lang in 2026
- Born: Katherine Kelly Wegeman; July 25, 1961 (age 65); Hollywood, California, U.S.
- Other name: Kelly Lang
- Occupation: Actress
- Years active: 1979–present
- Known for: The Bold and the Beautiful as Brooke Logan
- Spouses: Skott Snider (m. 1989; div. 1995); Alex D'Andrea (m. 1997; div. 2014)
- Children: 3
- Father: Keith R. Wegeman
- Relatives: Charles Lang (grandfather)

Katherine Kelly Lang (born Katherine Kelly Wegeman; July 25, 1961) is an American actress. She has portrayed Brooke Logan in the CBS soap opera The Bold and the Beautiful since 1987.

== Early life ==
Lang was born in Hollywood, California, and graduated from Beverly Hills High School. She is the daughter of Olympic ski jumper Keith R. Wegeman, a German-American and actress Judith Lang, an Anglo-American and the granddaughter of Oscar-winning cinematographer Charles Lang.

== Career ==
Lang made her acting debut in the film Skatetown, U.S.A. (1979), alongside Scott Baio, Maureen McCormick, and Patrick Swayze. That was followed by guest roles in numerous television series such as The Powers of Matthew Star, Masquerade, Riptide, Magnum, P.I., Happy Days, The Fall Guy and 1st & Ten. Lang starred in the 1996 television film Subliminal Seduction. In 1985, she appeared in four music videos: Alabama's "There's No Way" (where she played the love interest of Alabama lead singer Randy Owen) The Beach Boys' "Getcha Back" and its sequel "It's Gettin' Late" and The Medflys' "Compulsive" for a band from her childhood hometown, Carmel CA.

In 1987, Lang was offered the role of blue-collar Brooke Logan on the CBS soap opera The Bold and the Beautiful for the CBS Daytime programming block, and has been an integral part of the program ever since. Her love affair with Ridge Forrester (originally played by Ronn Moss, and since 2013 by Thorsten Kaye) has been a key story arc for 35 years, and a love triangle among Brooke, Ridge and Taylor (Originally played by Hunter Tylo and later Krista Allen and Rebecca Budig) stretched over more than thirty years starting with Taylor's entrance to the show in 1990. The show's 5,000th episode included only the four core characters: Brooke, Ridge, Stephanie and Eric. As of February 2015, Lang is one of only two actors to be on The Bold and the Beautiful throughout the series. The other is John McCook, who portrays Eric Forrester.

In 1999, she appeared as Brooke in The Young and the Restless, interacting with Eric Braeden (Victor), Peter Bergman (Jack), and Eileen Davidson (Ashley). Lang previously appeared on The Young and the Restless as Gretchen in 1981, and returned to the soap, for a brief stint, in July 2007. Her work as Brooke has been recognized with seven Soap Opera Digest Award nominations, beginning in 1991 and most recently in 2005.

In 2016, Lang made a special guest appearance as herself in the Australian soap opera Neighbours on 10 Peach. In January 2019, she returned to Australian television as a contestant on I'm a Celebrity...Get Me Out of Here! for season 5. In October 2019 she made a guest appearance on the Greek soap opera "8 lexeis" for SKAI TV. She played Grace Heart, a reporter who traveled from New York, to Corfu, Greece, only that was not her true identity!

== Personal life ==
Lang has been married twice. She is the mother of three children from her two marriages: her two sons Jeremy Skott Snider (born 1990), Julian Lang Snider (born 1992) from her then husband Skott Snider, and her daughter Zoe Katrina D'Andrea (born 1997) from her then husband Alex D'Andrea, and has a stepdaughter, Danyelle D'Andrea (born 1991).

On November 11, 2012, it was announced that Lang had filed for divorce, after 15 years of marriage citing "irreconcilable differences".

In May 2018, she became a grandmother with the birth of her granddaughter, Zuma, via her daughter Zoe.

== Filmography ==
=== Film ===
Year	Title	Role	Notes
1979	Skatetown, U.S.A.	Allison Johnson	
1981	Evilspeak	Susie Baker	
1982	Desperate Lives	Mary	Television film
1987	Jocks	Julie	
1987	The Night Stalker	Denise	
1987	Made in U.S.A.	Kelly	
1987	Delta Fever	Jillian	
1995	Till the End of the Night	Diana Davenport	
1996	Subliminal Seduction	Deb Danver	
2016	Monolith	Lilith	voice role
2016	Dear Diary I Died	Michelle Wilson	
2017	Garlic & Gunpowder	Mrs. Smith	
2019	Dagli occhi dell'amore	Sally	
2019	Hospice Odyssey	Herself	
2020	Stan the Man	Elizabeth Morgan	
2021	The Christmas Dance	Mary	
2021	The Magic	Catherine Kane	

=== Television ===
Year	Title	Role	Notes
1981	The Young and the Restless	Gretchen	
1983	The Powers of Matthew Star	Terri	Episode: "The Racer's Edge"
1983	Masquerade	Donna	Episode: "Diamonds"
1984	Happy Days	Kim	Episode: "Social Studies"
1984	Riptide	Mama Jo's Crew	Episode: "Hatchet Job"
1984	Legmen	Helen	Episode: "Poseidon Indenture"
1984	Dreams	Dream Blonde	Episode: "Kiss Me Red"
1985	Crazy Like a Fox		Episode: "Murder is a Two Stroke Penalty"
1986	The Fall Guy		Episode: "Miami's Nice"
1986	Disneyland	Widow Marian	Episode: "Mr. Boogedy"
1986	The Last Precinct	Tracey	3 episodes
1986	1st & Ten	Annie	6 episodes
1987	Magnum, P.I.	Lani	Episode: "The Aunt Who Came to Dinner"
1987	Circus of the Stars	Herself (performer)	Television special
1987–present	The Bold and the Beautiful	Brooke Logan	Lead role
1988	The 15th Annual Daytime Emmy Awards	Herself (co-host)	Television special
1996	Lonesome Dove: The Outlaw Years	Enona	2 episodes
1999	The Young and the Restless	Brooke Logan	4 episodes (January 6-8, 1999; May 11, 1999)
1999	Everything Can Be Better	Brooke Logan	1 episode
2000	Wheel of Fortune	Herself (contestant)	Episode: "Soap City Week 4"
2007	The Young and the Restless	Brooke Logan	1 episode (July 5, 2007)
2014	Ballando con le Stelle	Herself (contestant)	Season 10; 8 episodes
2016	Neighbours	Herself	1 episode
2016	The New Price Is Right	Herself (contestant)	Episode: "CBS Daytime #1 for 30 Years"
2018	Isidingo	Herself	1 episode
2019	I'm a Celebrity...Get Me Out of Here!	Herself (contestant)	Season 5; 16 episodes
2019	8 Words	Grace Hart	16 episodes
2020	The Real Housewives of Beverly Hills	Herself (guest)	Season 10; Episode: "Santa Denise"

== Awards and nominations ==
List of awards and nominations for Katherine Kelly Lang
Year	Award	Category	Work	Result	Ref.
1990	Soap Opera Update — MVP Award	Best Actress	The Bold and the Beautiful	Won	
1991	Soap Opera Update — MVP Award	Best Actress	The Bold and the Beautiful	Won	
1991	Soap Opera Digest Award	Outstanding Heroine	The Bold and the Beautiful	Nominated	
1991	Soap Opera Digest Award	Outstanding Story Line (shared with John McCook)	The Bold and the Beautiful	Nominated	
1992	Soap Opera Digest Award	Best Wedding (shared with John McCook)	The Bold and the Beautiful	Nominated	
1993	Soap Opera Digest Award	Hottest Female Star	The Bold and the Beautiful	Nominated	
1994	Soap Opera Digest Award	Hottest Female Star	The Bold and the Beautiful	Nominated	
1995	Soap Opera Update — MVP Award	Best Actress	The Bold and the Beautiful	Won	
1995	Soap Opera Digest Award	Hottest Soap Couple (shared with Ronn Moss)	The Bold and the Beautiful	Nominated	
1996	Soap Opera Digest Award	Outstanding Love Story (shared with Hunter Tylo and Ronn Moss)	The Bold and the Beautiful	Nominated	
2001	Soap Opera Digest Award	Favorite Storyline (shared with Winsor Harmon)	The Bold and the Beautiful	Nominated	
2001	Soap Opera Digest Award	Outstanding Heroine	The Bold and the Beautiful	Nominated	
2002	Daytime Emmy Award	America's Favorite Couple Special Fan Award (shared with Sean Kanan)	The Bold and the Beautiful	Nominated	
2003	Soap Opera Digest Award	Outstanding Lead Actress in a Daytime Drama	The Bold and the Beautiful	Nominated	
2004	TV Soap Golden Boomerang Award	Most Popular Couple (shared with Ronn Moss)	The Bold and the Beautiful	Won	
2004	TV Soap Golden Boomerang Award	Most Popular Female	The Bold and the Beautiful	Won	
2004	TV Soap Golden Boomerang Award	Most Popular Storyline (shared with Ronn Moss and Jennifer Finnigan)	The Bold and the Beautiful	Won	
2006	TV Soap Golden Boomerang Award	Most Popular Couple (shared with Ronn Moss)	The Bold and the Beautiful	Won	
2006	TV Soap Golden Boomerang Award	Most Popular Female Actor	The Bold and the Beautiful	Won	
2013	Daytime Emmy Award	Outstanding Supporting Actress in a Drama Series	The Bold and the Beautiful	Nominated	
2014	Daytime Emmy Award	Outstanding Lead Actress in a Drama Series	The Bold and the Beautiful	Nominated	
2016	Soap Awards France	Best Actress of the Year	The Bold and the Beautiful	Nominated	
2020	Daytime Emmy Award	Outstanding Lead Actress in a Drama Series	The Bold and the Beautiful	Nominated	
2020	Soap Hub Awards	Favorite The Bold and the Beautiful Actress	The Bold and the Beautiful	Nominated	
2024	Daytime Emmy Award	Outstanding Lead Actress in a Drama Series	The Bold and the Beautiful	Nominated	
