= Winsor Harmon =

American actor (born 1963)

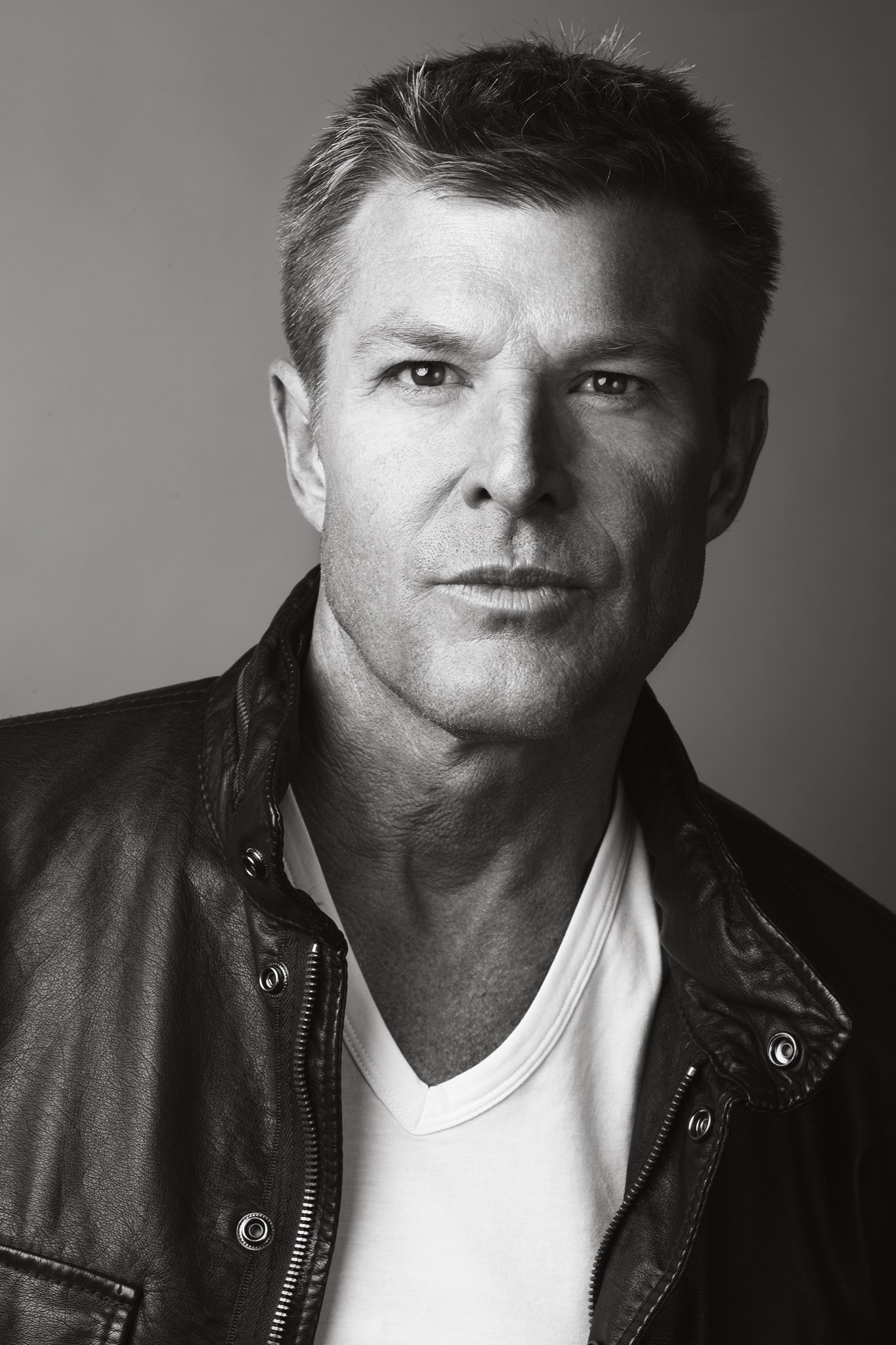
- Harmon in 2013
- Born: November 22, 1963 (age 62); Crowley, Louisiana, U.S.
- Occupation: Actor
- Years active: 1994–present
- Spouse: Candice Harmon (m. 1996; div. 1998)
- Children: 1

Winsor Harmon (born November 22, 1963) is an American actor best known for his role as Thorne Forrester on the American soap opera The Bold and the Beautiful. He took over the role from Jeff Trachta in December 1996 and stayed with the show for 20 years. He briefly returned to the role in March 2022 and in December 2023.

== Career ==
Harmon portrayed Del Henry on the program All My Children from 1994 to 1995. He has made appearances on Baywatch Nights and Acapulco H.E.A.T.. Harmon told Soap Opera Digest about his guest stint on H.E.A.T.: "I hung out with John McCook the whole time and I kept watching all these people from other countries asking for his autograph. I'm thinking to myself, 'Who the hell is this guy?' So one night, we were drinking Coronas and I asked him why he had so many fans and he explained how B&B was so popular around the world. I had no idea. The more he talked about it, the more I was thinking, 'I want to be on that show.'... The first time I drove into the parking lot, there was John, just pointing at me and laughing. He asked what I was doing here and I told him that I was Thorne. That's when he told me that he was going to be playing my dad. That was just too wild."

Before acting, Harmon was employed as a model with Ford Models.

== Personal life ==
Born in Louisiana, Harmon attended Rockwall High School in Rockwall, Texas, and graduated in 1982. He went on to study at Texas A&M University on a football scholarship. Harmon was one of the first to know that Mark Consuelos and co-star Kelly Ripa were dating and had secretly gotten married in Las Vegas.

== Filmography ==
Year	Title	Role	Other notes
1994–95	All My Children	Del Henry	
1996	Baywatch Nights	Harry the Bartender	1 episode
1996–2016, 2022, 2023	The Bold and the Beautiful	Thorne Forrester	1,462 episodes
1998	Acapulco H.E.A.T.	David Henry	1 episode
2005	Meiden van de Wit	Boudewijn Peuts	1 episode
2013	Cathedral Canyon	Ryan McBride	
2021	Cult Cartel	Ryan McBride	
2021	Sarogeto	Michael Stanton	

== See also ==
- Forrester family
