= Michael Dietz =

American actor and producer

- Born: February 10, 1971 (age 55); Allison Park, Pennsylvania, U.S.
- Occupations: Actor, producer
- Spouse: Paige Rowland (m. 2002)
- Children: 1

Michael Dietz (born February 10, 1971) is an American actor and producer.

== Career ==
He was an executive producer for GSN'S The Line and a co-executive producer for SyFy's Geeks Who Drink. Other producing credits include Celebrity Apprentice, Stars Earn Stripes, Tru TV's Killer Karaoke, Minute To Win It, Discovery Channel's One Man Army, Chefs vs City, and Great American Road Trip, as well as a challenge consultant for ABC'S Wipeout and a challenge producer for season ten of Big Brother. He produced the feature film Born which was shown at the Cannes Film Festival and was released by Lionsgate.

As an actor, he had guest stints on prime time shows Wasteland, Charmed, Beverly Hills, 90210, The Drew Carey Show, House, CSI, and Baywatch, as well as starring roles on Guiding Light, Port Charles, and The Bold and the Beautiful.

Dietz co-invented the board game Bubblebrain which has won several awards including Family Fun Magazine's Toy Of The Year.

In 2005, Dietz formed Lucky Butterfly Productions, a film and television company.

== Personal life ==
Dietz is married to actress Paige Rowland; the couple has one child.
