= Hunter Tylo =

American actress and writer (born 1962)

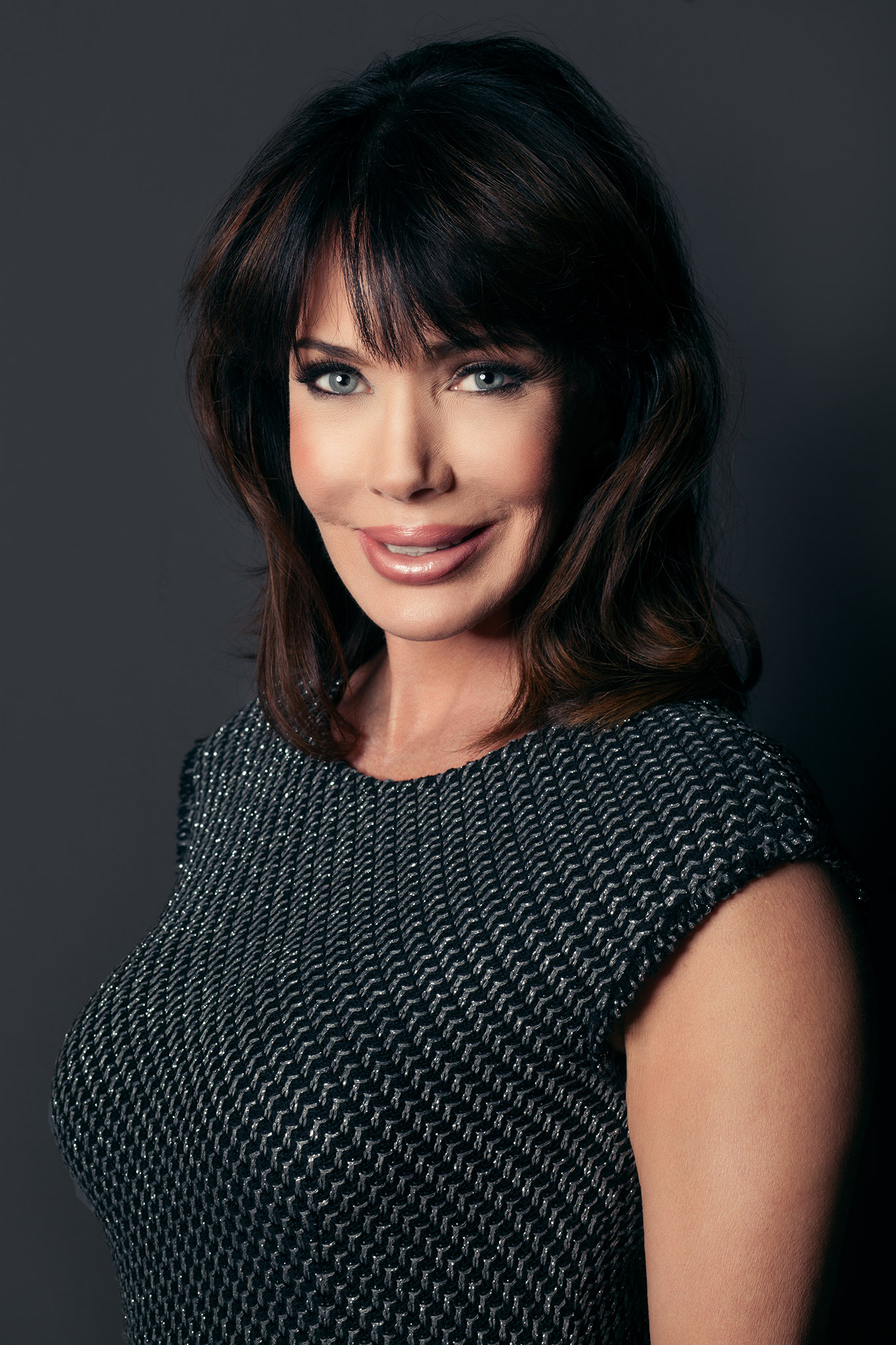
- Tylo in 2014
- Born: Deborah Jo Hunter; July 3, 1962 (age 64); Fort Worth, Texas, U.S.
- Other name: Deborah Morehart
- Education: Fordham University (did not graduate)
- Occupations: Actress, author, model
- Years active: 1980–2019
- Known for: Dr. Taylor Hayes in The Bold and the Beautiful
- Spouses: Tom Morehart (m. 1980; div. 1984) Michael Tylo (m. 1987; div. 2005) Gersson Archila (m. 2009; ann. 2018)
- Children: 4

Hunter Tylo (born Deborah Jo Hunter on 3 July 1962) is an American author and former actress and model. She portrayed the role of Taylor Hayes (1990–2002, 2004–14, 2018–19) on The Bold and the Beautiful.

== Early life ==
Tylo was raised in Springtown, Texas.

Tylo has an older sister Elizabeth as well as a younger brother named Cliff.

Tylo has been credited as Deborah Morehart; Morehart was the last name of her first husband.

== Career ==
In 1984, credited as Deborah Morehart, Tylo appeared in the sorority slasher film The Initiation with future Melrose Place actress Daphne Zuniga. Tylo subsequently became well known after playing regular roles in US daytime soap operas. Her television debut was on All My Children in 1985. Tylo was fired from the role in 1988, on the grounds of having a relationship with another cast member, Michael Tylo (whom she married in 1987).

In 1989, Tylo was cast as Marina Toscano, the half-sister of Isabella Toscano, on Days of Our Lives. The character was an antagonist who caused trouble for one of the soap's most popular couples, Steven "Patch" Johnson and Kayla Brady. Tylo later said, "Everyone hated my character.[...] I hated her. They [producers] said they were going to do something with her, but they never did. [...] I dreaded going to work for the last few weeks I was on the show." The character was later killed off and Tylo left the series in 1990.

Discouraged by her lack of success on soap operas, Tylo decided to quit acting and enrolled at Fordham University in the Bronx, New York, intending to be a pre-med student. She completed two years towards her bachelor's degree. As she and her husband were preparing to move to New York City permanently, she was offered the role of Dr. Taylor Hayes on The Bold and the Beautiful. She initially resisted the part but eventually relented. She began her tenure in 1990, while still pursuing her degree at Fordham.

In 2000, Tylo released her autobiography, Making a Miracle. Tylo left The Bold and the Beautiful in 2002. She returned to the show in 2004 for a two-episode appearance as a vision. In May 2005, she returned as a series regular and left the series again in July 2013. In 2014 she returned to the show for a several weeks story arc. From 2018 to 2019, she returned as a recurring character.

Tylo has been listed twice on People magazine's list of "50 Most Beautiful People In The World".

=== Melrose Place lawsuit ===
In 1996, Tylo was cast in the primetime soap opera Melrose Place and opted to leave The Bold and the Beautiful to take the role. However, she was fired by Melrose Place producer Aaron Spelling prior to filming any episodes for the series when she announced she was pregnant. The character Tylo was to play, Taylor McBride, was recast with Lisa Rinna taking the role. Tylo quickly returned to The Bold and the Beautiful. Tylo sued Spelling on grounds of discrimination for being pregnant and won $4.8 million from a Los Angeles jury. Spelling argued that Tylo's pregnancy rendered her unable to play the character, who was supposed to be a sexy seductress. During the trial, Tylo published pictures of herself while pregnant, which showed that she retained a slim figure. Prior to trial, during the discovery phase of the litigation, Tylo's lawyers won a partial victory in an interlocutory appeal challenging a lower court's order compelling her to answer a broad range of personal questions. The Court of Appeal established Tylo's right to refuse to answer questions in her deposition about marital problems and psychological treatment, although the Court sustained the portion of the order which compelled her to answer questions about her efforts to become pregnant, her husband's ability or inability to impregnate her, and communications with her agent with respect to her efforts and ability to become pregnant. The case is widely recognized as an important one in establishing the right of privacy in deposition and the right of actresses to continue to work while pregnant.

== Personal life ==
=== Marriages and children ===
Tylo has been married three times and has four children.

At age 17 she married her first husband, Tom Morehart, in 1980. They have a son, Christopher. Tylo and Morehart divorced in 1984. In 1987, she married actor Michael Tylo. The couple had one son, Michael Edward "Mickey" Tylo Jr (22 April 1988) and two daughters, Izabella Gabrielle (November 12, 1996) and Katya Ariel (January 15, 1998). In 1998, Katya was diagnosed with a rare cancer of the eye called retinoblastoma. Doctors removed the affected right eye and began chemotherapy. Later in the year, a tumor was detected in Katya's other eye; that tumor inexplicably disappeared. Katya recovered and wears a prosthetic right eye. The couple divorced in 2005. On October 18, 2007, their 19-year-old son drowned in the family pool in Henderson, Nevada. The Clark County Coroner concluded that Michael Tylo Jr.'s death was caused by "drowning due to seizure disorder" and was ruled accidental.

In May 2008, Tylo filed a restraining order against boyfriend Corey Cofield, claiming that he had acted violently towards her and her children. In October 2008 the order was terminated by Tylo stating that Cofield was "...actively been taking parenting classes and has attended family and couple's therapy".

Her mother Joanne Hunter died in 2009.

On November 29, 2009, Tylo married Gerson Archila in Las Vegas, Nevada. The marriage was annulled on August 30, 2018. Archila had changed his name from Gerrson Archila Morales to Gerson Archila to avoid his criminal past of poor moral character being detected. Archila has been convicted for three counts of spousal abuse, auto theft, drug paraphernalia, misrepresentation by false identity, and hiding a criminal past.

=== Religion ===
Tylo is a born again Christian. She attributes her daughter Katya's recovery from cancer to constant prayer and credits her faith for helping her deal with the death of her son, Michael.

== Filmography ==
=== Film ===
Year	Title	Role	Notes
1984	The Initiation	Alison	
1988	Final Cut	Anna	
2001	Longshot	Rachel Montgomery	
2005	Down and Derby	Teri Montana	

=== Television ===
Year	Title	Role	Notes
1985–1988	All My Children	Robin McCall	Regular role
1989–90	Days of Our Lives	Marina Toscano	Guest role
1990	Zorro	Senora Del Reynosa	Episode: "Family Business"
1990–2002, 2004–2014, 2018–2019	The Bold and the Beautiful	Dr. Taylor Hayes	Regular role (1990–2002, 2005–2013), recurring role (2014, 2018–2019), guest role (2004)
1994	The Maharaja's Daughter	Messua Shandar	TV miniseries
1994–95	Burke's Law	Penelope Jordan, Ingrid Rose	Episodes: "Who Killed the Soap Star?", "Who Killed the Hollywood Headshrinker?"
1996	Baywatch	Heather	Episode: "Windswept"
1997	Diagnosis: Murder	Claire McKenna	Episode: "Physician, Murder Thyself"
1997	The Nanny	Hunter Tylo	Episode: "The Heather Biblow Story"
2003	She Spies	Dr. Marks / Andres Sarlin	Episode: "Daze of Future Past"
2004	A Place Called Home	Billie Jeeters	TV film
2004	They Are Among Us	June	TV film
2005	SharkMan	Amelia	TV film

== Awards and nominations ==
List of awards and nominations for Hunter Tylo
Year	Award	Category	Work	Result	Ref.
1993	Soap Opera Update — MVP Award	Best Actress	The Bold and the Beautiful	Won	
1995	Soap Opera Digest Award	Hottest Female Star	The Bold and the Beautiful	Nominated	
1996	Soap Opera Digest Award	Outstanding Love Story (shared with Katherine Kelly Lang and Ronn Moss)	The Bold and the Beautiful	Nominated	
1997	Soap Opera Update — MVP Award	Best Actress	The Bold and the Beautiful	Won	
1998	Telvis Award	Most Popular Television Stars in Finland (shared with John McCook)	The Bold and the Beautiful	Won	
1999	Soap Opera Digest Award	Hottest Female Star	The Bold and the Beautiful	Nominated	
2002	Telvis Award	Favorite Foreign Actress	The Bold and the Beautiful	Won	
2003	Soap Opera Digest Award	Outstanding Plot Twist (shared with Ronn Moss)	The Bold and the Beautiful	Nominated	

== Book Sources ==
- Tylo, Hunter (2001). Making A Miracle. Simon & Schuster. ISBN 978-0-6710-2778-0.
