= Macy Alexander =

- The Bold and the Beautiful character
- Portrayed by: Bobbie Eakes
- Duration: 1989–2003
- First appearance: Episode 522; April 27, 1989
- Last appearance: Episode 4157; October 22, 2003
- Created by: William J. Bell
- Introduced by: William J. Bell and Lee Phillip Bell (1989); Bradley Bell (2001–02)
In-universe information
- Other names: Macy Forrester; Macy Chambers; Macy Barelli; Macy Sharpe
- Occupation: Spectra Fashions employee Singer
- Parents: Adam Alexander; Sally Spectra
- Half-brothers: C.J. Garrison
- Half-sisters: Kimberly Fairchild; Darla Forrester (adoptive)
- Husband: Thorne Forrester (1990–93, 1995–97, 2000–03); Grant Chambers (1998); Lorenzo Barelli (2002–03); Deacon Sharpe (2003)
- Aunts: Shirley Spectra
- Nieces: Alexandria Forrester (adoptive)
- Other relatives: Sally Spectra; Coco Spectra

Macy Alexander is a fictional character in the American soap opera The Bold and the Beautiful. Bobbie Eakes played the role from April 27, 1989, to July 2000, briefly in August 2001, and again from December 2002 to October 2003. Macy was introduced as the daughter of Sally Spectra, with many of her storylines revolving around her relationship with Thorne Forrester, whom she has been married to three times. Other storylines have revolved around her relationships with both her paternal and maternal family, and various other men, including Grant Chambers, Lorenzo Barelli and Deacon Sharpe.

== Development ==
After the scenes involving Macy being crushed by chandelier aired, it was initially unknown when Macy would recover or be killed off, though Eakes said that the character could be resurrected again even if she did die.

== Storylines ==
Macy met Thorne Forrester (Clayton Norcross) in a bar as she was walking out while he bumped into her. The second time they met was on the Queen Mary, where the Spectras and the Forresters were having a fashion showdown (now Jeff Trachta). Her mother Sally (Darlene Conley) had been trying to arrange for Macy to end up with Ridge (Ronn Moss), but it was Ridge's brother Thorne who walked into the room and caught Macy coming out of the shower. It was a while before they ran into each other again at the Bikini Bar, each nursing their own broken heart—Thorne for his soon-to-be-ex-wife Caroline (Joanna Johnson), and Macy for Mick Savage, a photographer who had run out on her. They spent the night together at Big Bear, but neither intended for it to be more until they cohosted a benefit together and discovered they both loved singing. After dating for some time, Thorne proposed to Macy, but there was one problem - Macy had never told Thorne that she was Sally Spectra's daughter because the Forresters would never have accepted the truth. Macy accepted Thorne's proposal, but while telling her mother, Sally revealed that Eye on Fashion had a picture of Clarke (Daniel McVicar) and Sally's wedding, which included Macy. When Thorne, who had found out from his family, confronted her, she admitted who she was and returned the ring. Macy was heartbroken to have lost Thorne, but within a few weeks, Thorne's first wife Caroline died and Thorne, with Sally's help, returns to Macy to ask for another chance.

Their wedding plans don't go smoothly, as hile Macy's family supported them, only Thorne's sister Felicia (Colleen Dion-Scotti) is willing to be part of their wedding. Macy and Thorne decide to have a church ceremony, and they are pleasantly surprised when Thorne's entire family show up. However, the Forresters have trouble truly accepting Macy as Thorne's wife, and Macy and Thorne are constantly arguing over Sally, leading to their separation. After waiting for Thorne to come to her (he was waiting for the same thing), Macy gets involved with tennis pro Jake Maclaine (Todd McKee), who has recently broken up with Felicia. Thorne eventually asks Macy to reunite, but Macy opts to stay with Jake. It isn't long before she regrets her decision and goes home to Thorne, who welcomes her back with open arms. However, they start fighting again and Thorne soon falls for Karen (also played by Joanna Johnson), the long-lost twin of his first love, Caroline.

During her relationship with Jake, Macy is accused of stealing the BeLieF formula from Forrester. Jake eventually confessed to the crime, spurring him and his sister into leaving town. Macy and Thorne again reunite, but the relationship suffers due to Macy's alcoholism and Anthony Armando (Michael Sabatino) coming between them. When model Ivana (Monika Schnarre) is found dead, Thorne was accused of the crime, but it turns out it was Anthony. When Macy and Thorne begin singing together again, they renew their relationship and remarry. Macy also is diagnosed with throat cancer but survives. Her relationship with Thorne ends again when he gets involved with Claudia Cortéz (Lilly Melgar), a Forrester employee who is in the country illegally. Macy throws herself into trying to get over Thorne, and while she was trying to do that, she was making friends with Grant Chambers (Charles Grant), a new designer at Spectra. They fall in love and start planning a wedding.

For the first time in her life, there was no stress in Macy's relationship. Without needing to worry that the Forresters would disapprove of her or that Thorne (now Winsor Harmon) would disapprove of her mother, Macy and Grant could simply enjoy their time together. The two were blissfully in love, and planning a family and a future. When Macy was having trouble getting pregnant, they decided to go to the doctor for tests, and while there, Macy and Grant were treated to a shock—Grant had cancer, and he didn't have long to live. Macy was devastated to learn that she had found the love of her life but would soon lose him. Macy stayed by his side for the remaining time he had left, but when Grant died, she started drinking heavily. Thorne (who had given up on his quest for Ridge's wife Taylor) was there to help pull her out, and the two were soon back together, planning a wedding and a future. However, Thorne's former sister-in-law Brooke Logan had set her sights on Thorne, and Brooke worked behind the scenes until she came between Thorne and Macy, and the two broke up. Macy thought it was over until she got a call from Thorne, and assuming he and Brooke were finished, Macy married Thorne in Amsterdam.

Around this time, Macy's long-lost father showed up back in the picture, bringing with him his own teenage daughter Kimberly (Ashley Lyn Cafagna). Macy soon grew very close to both her father and her half-sister. Romantically, it wasn't long before Macy realized that Thorne had married her on the rebound and had no intention of stopping his relationship with Brooke Logan (Katherine Kelly Lang). She began to drink more heavily, which was not helped by Brooke flaunting her relationship with Thorne. Macy finally went up to Big Bear to say goodbye to Thorne and was ready to sign the divorce papers when Brooke arrived demanding that Macy let Thorne go so she could have him. Furious, Macy took off in the car, with Brooke tagging along so she could force her to sign the papers. After a horrible car accident, Macy was presumed dead, devastating her mother and half-siblings.

Thorne has a vision of Macy when he visits her grave in 2001. The following year, it is revealed that Macy is alive and well, the explosion threw her down an embankment and she crawled to an abandoned cabin. Her father, Adam (Michael Swan) had found her and took her to Italy with him. While there, Macy, under the name Lena, fell in love with Lorenzo Barelli (Luigi Amodeo). She was noticed by Thorne when she was singing in a small Italian café, and when her mother Sally had a heart attack, she returned to Los Angeles with Lorenzo, who had become her husband. Thorne wasted no time in telling her that since she never signed the divorce papers they were still legally married, and after Macy realized she could never love Lorenzo the way she loved Thorne, Lorenzo left town and Macy and Thorne reunited. Unfortunately, at a time when he thought they were broken up, Thorne had indulged in a one-night stand with Macy's best friend and adoptive half-sister Darla (Schae Harrison). Around the same time Macy was having an emergency hysterectomy, Darla was discovering she was pregnant with Thorne's child. Although the plan was initially for Macy and Thorne to adopt the child (without Macy knowing Thorne was the father), once the truth came out Macy asks him for an annulment.

Macy finds comfort in recovering alcoholic Deacon Sharpe (Sean Kanan). Their friendship becomes romantic and Macy helps Deacon pursue custody of his son "Little Eric" (Connor Carmody) and his daughter Hope Logan (Rachel and Amanda Pace). Macy partially helps Deacon to get revenge on Brooke, who Macy has not forgiven. Deacon and Macy married and began raising Eric (whom Deacon had won custody of) together, and things were finally back on track. When Oscar Marone (Brian Gaskill) opened a new nightclub in town, Macy agreed to perform on opening night, but enemies from Oscar's past tampered with the chandelier that night, which fell, severely injuring Macy. Although Macy hung on in the hospital in a coma for a few days, she never woke up, and her mother had to make the choice of whether or not to take her off life support. Sally's choice has never been revealed, though a funeral was held for Macy. When Thorne and Darla's daughter was born a few weeks later, she is named Alexandria in honor of Macy.

== Reception ==
In November 2003, whilst discussing the current storylines and characters of The Bold and the Beautiful, Nancy M. Reichardt from the Edmonton Journal wrote that Macy had returned "amid much fanfare" and that her return was "effective" and led to the "romantic culmination" of Thorne and Macy's love; however, she also added, "Yet, from the time she returned, Macy was like a ship without a rudder. It is not that Eakes and Harmon didn't have chemistry, the show just did not use them well." In 2018, Michael Maloney from Soap Hub called Macy a "fan favorite" and "tragic heroine died not only once, but twice!" In 2022, Charlie Mason from Soaps She Knows placed Macy at #13 on his ranked list of The Bold and the Beautiful's Best of the Best Characters Ever, commenting "Bobbie Eakes' songbird spent the bulk of her long run on The Bold and the Beautiful singing the blues, thanks to the fact that her relationship with true love Thorne was, in the best of times, on-again/off-again."
