= Darla Forrester =

Darla Einstein Forrester
- The Bold and the Beautiful character
- Portrayed by: Schae Harrison
- Duration: 1989–2007; 2014–2015
- First appearance: Episode 454; January 19, 1989
- Last appearance: Episode 7124; July 21, 2015
- Created by: William J. Bell
In-universe information
- Other names: Darla Einstein; Darla Dinkle
- Occupation: Assistant to Sally Spectra
- Adoptive mother: Sally Spectra
- Half-brothers: CJ Garrison (adoptive)
- Half-sisters: Macy Alexander (adoptive)
- Husband: Thorne Forrester (2004–2006)
- Daughters: Alexandria Forrester
- Aunts: Shirley Spectra (adoptive)

Darla Einstein Forrester is a fictional character from the CBS soap opera The Bold and the Beautiful, played by Schae Harrison from 1989 to July 18, 2006; also appearing as a ghost in July 2007, March, April, and November 2014, and in June and July 2015.

== Casting ==
Harrison debuted in the role in January 1989, and departed in July 2006, when her character was killed off after being accidentally run over by Taylor Hayes, but made additional appearances in December 2006 and July 2007 as a ghost. On January 29, 2014, Michael Logan from TV Guide reported that Harrison had reprised her role and would be returning to the show. A representative for the show said Harrison would feature in three episodes airing from March 18. The episodes saw Darla appear to her now-teenage daughter Aly (Ashlyn Pearce) as a ghost. She made additional appearances in November of the same year. In May 2015, Harrison confirmed via Twitter that she would be returning as Darla again as a ghost. Harrison said that she had an "awesome story line".

== Storylines ==
Darla was born and raised in foster homes, and the amount of time she spent shuffling from one place to another had a permanent impact on how she viewed herself. Regardless of how hard she tried, she couldn't stop herself from worrying that she would always be found lacking in some way.

From the beginning of the show, she was always Sally Spectra's (Darlene Conley) faithful assistant, who she looked up to as her mother. Although she had a soft spot for fashion designer Clarke Garrison (Daniel McVicar), in the end, her loyalty was always to Sally. After a brief failed relationship with Bill Spencer (Jim Storm), Darla had little airtime for many years, until winding up in bed with Thorne Forrester (Winsor Harmon) one night in 2003 and getting pregnant.

A drunken Thorne didn't even realize what he was doing at the time, and Darla originally planned to have an abortion, but Thorne convinced her to give the child to him and his wife, Macy (Bobbie Eakes), who was also Darla's best friend. After Macy chose Deacon Sharpe (Sean Kanan) over Thorne, Darla decided to keep the baby and raise it herself. Thorne, knowing he'd lost Macy, decided to lend a hand in raising his child. When the little girl was born, she was named Alexandria in honor of Macy, who had recently died as a result of an accident. Darla and Thorne had formed a romantic attachment, each realizing that they had found the person they had searched their whole life for, and Darla happily accepted when Thorne proposed. The two were soon married.

Darla was at odds with Thorne's brother Ridge Forrester (Ronn Moss) and his wife Brooke Logan Forrester (Katherine Kelly Lang). Ridge wanted Darla to keep her mouth shut about family business and to stay out of things, constantly calling her names such as "dingbat" and "glorified secretary". Darla, however, refused to let Ridge continue to belittle Thorne. While in Thorne's office one day, printing out some photographs of Sally and her together for Sally's birthday, she left the envelope on the desk while talking to Clarke, who was trying to convince her to steal the Ingénue line from Forrester. She didn't see Megan (Maeve Quinlan) take her envelope (containing Sally's birthday photos) off the blotter and put it to the side and put the envelope with the Ingénue shots on the blotter. Darla accidentally gave the envelope to Sally. Ridge was furious, and made it clear she was either one of two things—a manipulator, or a dingbat. Darla ran out of the room in tears and went home to pack her bags, but Thorne stopped her, swearing that no matter what, he would always love her, and did not blame her.

The battle between Thorne and Ridge only got worse until Thorne told his parents that one brother had to leave the company. Both Brooke and Darla campaigned for their significant other in the meantime until Eric and Stephanie made up their minds. They chose to keep Ridge, which prompted Thorne to quit Forrester Creations. Sally saw this as an opportunity and made Thorne a job offer. Thorne accepted and he became president of Spectra Fashions. Darla's continued support and encouragement helped Thorne continue to stand up for himself in front of his family on a personal and business front.

In 2005, Sally put all her money in Thomas Forrester's designs which were competing against those of the Forresters in a fashion showdown. When Forrester Creations came out on top, Sally was devastated and knew that her company would soon face trouble. Shortly after, Sally gathered Darla, Clarke, Thorne, Thomas and her faithful Spectra employees at her office to announce she was going to shut down the company and as a retirement gift to herself, take a long cruise around the world. This of course was a ruse on Sally's part as she was really retiring due to health complications as she was now a wheelchair user. When Darla realised what was really going on with Sally, she invited Sally to come and live with her and Thorne at their beach house as Sally was like family to her.

One night, after Alexandria's fourth birthday party, Thorne's niece Phoebe (MacKenzie Mauzy) got a flat tire and was stranded at the side of a busy road. She called her mother Taylor (Hunter Tylo), but the call was interrupted when a mysterious bearded man approached Phoebe and she screamed and dropped the phone. Worried about her daughter, a frantic Taylor, who had been drinking, got into her car and rushed to find Phoebe. Phoebe had gotten back into the car and, unbeknownst to Taylor, also called Darla. Darla got to Phoebe first and insisted on changing the tire, Darla lost her balance and fell in front of Taylor's car. A horrified Taylor tried to revive her good friend and sister-in-law, and Phoebe called an ambulance. Darla was rushed to hospital in critical condition. A devastated Thorne and Sally gathered at Darla's bed as she flatlined and died with Thorne at her side.

Darla occasionally appears to Aly in a cloud-like circle, and the two carry on conversations. Only Aly can see her, but she has the power to make her presence known to others, in subtle ways. In late June 2015, Aly becomes increasingly agitated about Steffy Forrester's permanent return to Forrester Creations. Darla appears to Aly on a daily basis, with her appearance changing to reflect Aly's dark and angry mood.

== Reception ==
During a 2014 feature on what storylines were working and not working for the show, a Soap World reporter thought Darla's return to help out Aly was "a disaster". The reporter wondered why the producers brought back a popular character if they were not going to use all of her, saying "forcing a fun and effervescent actress like Schae Harrison to play a 'dismembered floating head' is stupid."

In 2022, Charlie Mason from Soaps She Knows placed Darla 27th on his ranked list of The Bold and the Beautiful’s Best of the Best Characters Ever, commenting "Yeah, yeah, the original Sally Spectra's gal Friday was meant to be the embodiment of a dumb-blonde joke. But she had the last laugh, making us care more when she passed away than we ever imagined we would."
