= Thorne Forrester =

- The Bold and the Beautiful character
- Winsor Harmon as Thorne Forrester
- Portrayed by: Clayton Norcross (1987–1989); Jeff Trachta (1989–1996); Winsor Harmon (1996–2016, 2022–2023); Ingo Rademacher (2017–2019)
- Duration: 1987–2019; 2022–2023
- First appearance: March 23, 1987
- Last appearance: December 15, 2023
- Created by: William J. Bell
- Book appearances: Sunset Love (2014)
- Ingo Rademacher as Thorne Forrester
In-universe information
- Occupation: Businessman; Fashion designer; Singer
- Family: Forrester
- Father: Eric Forrester
- Mother: Stephanie Forrester
- Sisters: Kristen Forrester; Felicia Forrester; Angela Forrester
- Half-brothers: Ridge Forrester; Rick Forrester; Marcus Forrester (adoptive)
- Half-sisters: Bridget Forrester
- Wife: Caroline Spencer Forrester (1987–1989); Macy Alexander (1990–1993, 1995–1997, 2000–2003); Brooke Logan (2001); Darla Forrester (2004–2006); Katie Logan (2018–2019)
- Daughters: Alexandria Forrester
- Uncles: John Forrester
- Aunts: Pamela Douglas
- Nephews: Dino Damiano; Zende Forrester Dominguez (adoptive); Thomas Forrester; R.J. Forrester; Logan Forrester Knight
- Nieces: Steffy Forrester; Phoebe Forrester; Nicole Marone; Rosie Forrester (adoptive); Lizzy Forrester
- First cousins: Jessica Forrester; Ivy Forrester

Thorne Forrester is a fictional character on CBS soap opera The Bold and the Beautiful. The character was played by Clayton Norcross from the show's premiere in 1987 until 1989, by Jeff Trachta from 1989 until 1996 and Winsor Harmon from 1996 to 2016. In September 2017, Harmon announced that the role of Thorne was to be recast, and several days after, it was announced that daytime veteran Ingo Rademacher had been cast in the role; he made his first appearance on November 27, 2017. Rademacher departed the role in February 2019. Harmon briefly returned to the role in March 2022, and once again in December 2023.

== Casting ==
Clayton Norcross originated the role of Thorne.

Actor Clayton Norcross debuted in the role of Thorne in the serial's premiere episode on March 23, 1987. He remained in the role until September 12, 1989, when he was recast with Jeff Trachta, who made his debut on September 13, 1989. In 1996, Trachta was let go from the role and was recast with former All My Children actor Winsor Harmon. Trachta last aired on December 9, 1996, while Harmon debuted on December 10, 1996. In May 2010, it was announced that Harmon had been downgraded to a recurring capacity, following a "mutual decision" between Harmon and the higher ups at The Bold and the Beautiful. On September 23, 2017, Harmon announced that executive producer Bradley Bell intended to recast the role of Thorne. Two days later, TV Insider's Michael Logan announced that former General Hospital actor Ingo Rademacher had been cast in the role of Thorne; he made his first appearance on November 27, 2017. On his exit, Harmon stated: "It shocked me, especially since [Executive Producer Brad Bell] had called said, 'I want you to come to the fan club event [in August].' I was told there was a storyline coming and then [a month later], I got the call from him that he was going to recast the role. So yeah, it was a bit of a shocker, I have to say." On December 22, 2018, Rademacher announced he had opted to not extend his deal and announced his imminent exit from the role.

On November 3, 2023, it was announced Harmon would reprise the role from December 5 to 15.

== Storylines ==
Thorne Forrester is the younger and only biological son of Eric and Stephanie Forrester. Thorne is raised in Beverly Hills with his siblings, Ridge (Ronn Moss), Kristen, and Felicia Forrester. Thorne grows up in big brother Ridge's shadow and has a crush on his fiancée, Caroline Spencer (Joanna Johnson). When Caroline breaks up with Ridge, Thorne befriends her, and they develop a romance. Knowing Caroline still loves Ridge, Thorne convinces Ridge's new girlfriend, Brooke Logan (Katherine Kelly Lang), to hide a letter in which Ridge professes his devotion to Caroline. After Thorne and Caroline marry, Caroline is furious when she learns of Thorne's part in hiding the letter. One night, Ridge slips into Caroline's bed and they have sex after she mistakes him for Thorne. Afterwards, Thorne is frustrated by Caroline's hesitancy to be intimate with him. While recovering from an appendectomy, Thorne overhears Eric and Stephanie discussing Ridge's prank. Drinking heavily while on sleeping pill, Thorne grabs Stephanie's gun and shoots Ridge in the head. Thorne passes out, so Stephanie wipes Thorne's fingerprints from the gun and tells the police that she had shot Ridge, thinking he was a prowler. Neither Thorne nor Ridge have any memory of that night. Thorne's family try extensively to keep Thorne from remembering what he had done, fearing a repeat episode. Caroline, who wants Ridge back, takes Thorne to a therapist under the guise of getting marriage counseling, and soon Thorne is strong enough to grant Caroline a divorce. When Thorne learns of Ridge's prank, Thorne cuts both Ridge and Caroline out of his life.

Thorne had grown up thinking his youngest sister, Angela, was dead, but Stephanie was caring for a comatose Angela on the sly. No one knew that Angela's doctor had replaced Angela, who had died, with an imposter to bilk money out of the Forresters. "Angela" was severely burned escaping with the doctor, and introduces herself to Thorne as Deveney Dickson. Thorne's empathy and offer of plastic surgery softens "Deveney", who falls in love with Thorne, but "Deveney" still drugs Thorne and gives him a gun to shoot Ridge. Thorne responds when Ridge talked him down, and Angela gets away with the money Thorne had given her.

Thorne meets Macy Alexander (Bobbie Eakes), the daughter of Sally Spectra (Darlene Conley). Thorne briefly dates Macy and Donna Logan (Carrie Mitchum) at the same time, but ultimately chooses Macy. The Forresters and the Spectras are fashion rivals and do not approve of Thorne and Macy's relationship. Thorne and Macy marry anyway but separate when the strain of the families' battle become too much. Thorne gets close to Karen Spencer (Johnson), Caroline's twin. Thorne asks Karen to move in with him just as Macy asks for a reconciliation, and the three end up living together. Macy and Karen get into a food fight over Thorne, who cannot choose between them. Thorne finally decides on Macy, but misinterprets Macy's goodbye hug with her ex Jake Maclaine (Todd McKee), prompting Thorne to settle for Karen. Thorne and Macy's attempts at communication are thwarted by Karen, her father, Bill Spencer, Sr. (Jim Storm), and Sly Donovan.

Karen leaves Thorne after she realizes that Thorne still loves Macy. Thorne finds Macy passed out in an alley, after which they clear up their misunderstandings and reconcile. Thorne refuses to support Eric's marriage to Sheila Carter, so she spikes Macy's orange juice. Thorne clashes with Spectra designer Anthony Armando, which leads to be Macy and Thorne splitting up again. Thorne dates Forrester model Ivana Vanderveld. Thorne and Macy begin singing together and are signed by Decadent Records. Ivana is jealous when Thorne and Macy perform together in Rotterdam. Macy collapses after a show and is diagnosed with throat cancer. Thorne gives up singing and proposes to Macy after she recovers from surgery. Ivana begins sending Macy threatening fan letters, and Thorne fights with Ivana. Soon after, Ivana is murdered with Thorne's letter opener and he is arrested during his wedding to Macy, as he has been framed by Anthony, who wants Macy for himself. Thorne breaks out of prison to protect Macy, who is in Mexico with Anthony. Thorne extracts a confession from him, which Macy overhears. Thorne is recaptured and Macy tries to goad Anthony into confessing on tape but is discovered, and Sally is shot in the ensuing melée. Thorne and Macy remarry after Anthony is apprehended.

Thorne performs Grease on Broadway for four months. Upon his return, Thorne befriends Claudia Cortez, who has come to the U.S. illegally for political asylum. Thorne gives Claudia a job at Forrester, and she falls for him. When Macy catches Claudia giving Thorne a massage, Macy reports Claudia to immigration, driving a wedge between Macy and Thorne. After Macy divorces Thorne, Claudia and Thorne almost have sex, but Claudia shields away when she realizes that Thorne has strong feelings for Ridge's wife, Taylor Hayes. Thorne saves Taylor from a fire and stands by her as she recovers from her burns. While Ridge is in jail, Thorne convinces Taylor to lie that Ridge's baby is Thorne's and even proposes to Taylor in Hawaii. Taylor wants to tell Ridge the truth, so Thorne works with Brooke to prevent it, even sedating Taylor with a drugged protein shake when Ridge comes to visit. Thorne agrees to help Taylor stop Ridge and Brooke's wedding, but Taylor goes into labor in Thorne's car, forcing Thorne to deliver baby Thomas Forrester himself. Ridge finds out the truth and reunites with Taylor.

Thorne moves in next door to the newly married Macy and Grant. Macy is jealous when her best friend, Darla Einstein (Schae Harrison), flirts with Thorne. Grant is diagnosed with untreatable testicular cancer and wants Thorne to fulfill Macy's desire to have a family. Thorne shocks Macy by kissing her as Grant is dying in his hospital bed. After Grant dies, Macy only accepts Thorne's friendship. Thorne, who has quit Forrester Creations over Stephanie's preferential treatment of Ridge, steps in and saves Spectra Fashions from bankruptcy. When Macy hedges about accepting Thorne's proposal because of their families' feud, Thorne connects with Brooke. Thorne arrives at the Big Bear cabin to find Stephanie terrorizing Brooke and saves Brooke from being stabbed by Stephanie. Later, Stephanie has a stroke and doesn't remember finding Thorne with Brooke together, so Thorne and Brooke keep their continuing relationship secret to prevent Stephanie from having another episode. Thorne is conflicted and even dreams that his relationship with Brooke had killed Stephanie.

Thorne reconciles with an unsuspecting Macy to throw Stephanie off the scent, narrowly avoiding a surprise wedding to Macy that Stephanie has arranged. Eric, Ridge, and Taylor plot to convince Thorne that Brooke still loved Ridge. While in Venice, Italy, Ridge stages a fight with Taylor and then makes a move on Brooke. Thorne is devastated to see Brooke kissing Ridge. Thorne follows Macy to the airport and marries her in Amsterdam. Macy starts drinking again when she learns that Brooke and Thorne still have feelings for each other. A sober Macy asks Thorne, who wants a divorce, to come to Big Bear for a last dance before ending their marriage. After Thorne leaves, Brooke confronts Macy with divorce papers and jumps in her car, and it leads to the car crashing into a tanker. Thorne arrives and saves Brooke, but the car explodes before he can get to Macy. At her funeral, Sally exposes Thorne's continuing relationship with Brooke, causing Stephanie to have another stroke. She forces Thorne to choose between Brooke and his family. Thorne chooses Brooke, and Stephanie disowns him.

Macy's half-sister, Kimberly Fairchild (Ashley Tesoro), tries to seduce Thorne away from Brooke. Brooke's children, Rick and Bridget, are also against Brooke's relationship with Thorne. Kimberly kisses Thorne backstage at a fashion show, and Bridget raises the curtain so the public see. Brooke broke things off, and Kimberly takes advantage of an inebriated Thorne by lying that they'd had sex. Kimberly also tries to kill Brooke twice: one by pushing her out of the window and second by rigging a photographer's light to fall on her. Thorne and Brooke reconcile and marry at the Forrester mansion, even managing to get last-minute support from the family. Thorne's happiness is short-lived when he overhears Brooke saying that Ridge will always be her soul mate. Thorne has a vision of Macy, and, feeling he has made a terrible mistake with Brooke, asks Brooke for an annulment. Thorne shares a few kisses with grief counselor Tricia Quick.

Thorne learns that Macy is alive: Adam Alexander, Macy's father, had saved Macy before her car exploded, and took Macy on the run due to his mob connections. Thorne is dismayed when Macy insists on staying in Italy and marrying her fiancé, Lorenzo Barelli. Macy returns to Los Angeles after Sally's heart attack, where Thorne informs Macy they are still married because she did not sign their divorce papers. Macy's marriage to Lorenzo is invalid, leading Thorne and Macy to again reconcile. Thorne mistakes Macy's goodbye to Lorenzo, thinking she cheated on him. Thorne gets drunk and sleeps with Darla, thinking she is Macy. Darla reveals she is pregnant with Thorne's child and wants an abortion. Thorne asked Darla to let him and Macy raise her child. Macy asks Thorne for an annulment after she finds out the truth. Thorne grows closer to Darla during her pregnancy. Macy makes peace with Thorne and Darla, but she is killed after a chandelier crashes down on Macy, sending her into a coma. Darla names her child Alexandria "Aly" in tribute to Macy's memory. Darla supports Thorne as he asks to be made president of Forrester Creations, and they marry. After a series of events, including fights with Ridge and Eric picking Ridge over Thorne, Thorne leaves the company and is made acting president of Spectra by Sally, where he uses Forrester's client list to gain support. Thorne steals Forrester designs to use in a Spectra fashion show in addition the company's original designs. Thorne challenges Forrester to a fashion showdown with Spectra. Thorne gains Eric's respect even after losing the competition. Ridge overhears Eric call Thorne his "only son" and tries to stop Spectra's line from being stocked alongside Forrester in boutiques. Thorne sells his Forrester shares and invests the money in Spectra, but loses it after another fashion showdown. Stephanie offers Thorne his presidency back.

Darla dies after falling into the path of a drunken Taylor's car. Thorne is devastated, and asks for Taylor's psychiatric expertise to help explain things to Aly. Thorne and Taylor became close and fall in love. When Thorne proposes to Taylor, he is horrified to hear that she is responsible for Darla's death and feels betrayed that he was not told. Taylor is arrested but Thorne encourages Taylor to change her plea to not guilty, and Taylor is released. Later, Nick Marone took control of Forrester Creations, and Thorne and Ridge help Eric create a new company, Forrester Originals. Thorne and Taylor move ahead with their plans to marry, but when Aly finds out Taylor is responsible for Darla's death, she blacks out Taylor's pictures with crayon and slashes Taylor's wedding dress. Thorne and Taylor cancel their engagement, realizing Aly isn't ready to see them married. Thorne becomes despondent and again turns to alcohol. Thorne reconnects with Donna (now Jennifer Gareis), seeing Darla's face as they have sex. Thorne asks Donna to marry him, unaware that she is only using him to get back at Stephanie for constantly hurting Brooke. On the wedding day, Donna's other sister, Katie Logan (Heather Tom), overhears Donna admitting she doesn't love Thorne. Katie tells Thorne and he cancels the ceremony. Thorne is unhappy when Donna moves on to Eric, and finds himself bonding with Katie, although a romance doesn't develop. When Eric plans to announce his relationship with Donna at a fashion show, Thorne and Felicia lock Donna in the Forrester steam room to keep her from taking the stage. Thorne and his family fight Eric on his decision to give Donna a position in the company. When Eric falls into a coma, Donna temporarily fires Thorne and his siblings. Thorne hires lookalikes to make Eric think that Donna cheated on him but his plan is exposed and Donna and Eric reunite. Thorne is suspected of giving Forrester designs to Jackie M after he made noise about Rick and Ridge getting too much attention at Forrester, but the real culprit is Rick. Thorne feels unappreciated when Brooke makes Rick president over him. Thorne and Felicia, feeling Forrester is overrun with Logans, resign from Forrester. Bill Spencer, Jr. (Don Diamont) takes control of Forrester and his new CEO wife, Katie, offers Thorne the vice presidency, but he refuses. He joins his family in creating the ugly Dare line in an unsuccessful attempt to sabotage Bill. Thorne is upset when his niece Steffy Forrester (Jacqueline MacInnes Wood) gets the company back but does not give Thorne any stock.

Liam Cooper (Scott Clifton) comes to town looking for his father. Thorne and Bill had dated Kelly Cooper, Liam's late mother, and Thorne submits a DNA test, which shows that Bill is Liam's father. Thorne and Taylor begin dating again. Aly begins working at Forrester Creations with Hope Logan, whilst Thorne works as head of Forrester International. Thorne returns several times and reveals to his relatives that he has started a new relationship with Taylor, which angers Aly, but begins to accept the relationship. Thorne returns after Aly's death in July 2015 and in September 2016 to stop Eric wedding to Quinn Fuller. In 2018, Katie begins dating Thorne again. Thorne convinces Katie to go after full custody of her son with Bill. To secure Katie's chances, Thorne and Katie get married. Full custody is awarded to Katie, but acrimony between the Forrester brothers and Bill ensues. A fight breaks out between Bill, Ridge, and Thorne; Bill ends up falling over his house's balcony and is in a coma. Thorne and Katie get an annulment the following year with him leaving town shortly afterwards. Years later, a vision of Thorne appears to Brooke. In the following year he appears while Eric is fighting for his life but ultimately he survives.

== Reception ==
In November 2003, whilst discussing the current storylines and characters of The Bold and the Beautiful, Nancy M. Reichardt from the Edmonton Journal opined that Harmon was a "successful recast" but criticised the use of the character in the wake of Macy's return, writing, "It is not that Eakes and Harmon didn't have chemistry, the show just did not use them well". Charlie Mason from Soaps She Knows placed the recasting of Harmon with Rademacher as Thorne on his list of the worst soap opera recasts, commenting that the recast caused fans to do "a double, then a triple take". Mason also placed Thorne 30th on his ranked list of The Bold and the Beautiful's Best of the Best Characters Ever, commenting "Insert head-shake here. The Forrester scion at No. 7 [Ridge] is cool and all, but that isn't — and, to be clear, never was — any reason to banish his oft-recast, perpetually-underused kid brother to the basement of the family's gladrags high-rise."
