= Katie Logan =

- The Bold and the Beautiful character
- Heather Tom as Katie Logan
- Portrayed by: Nancy Sloan (1987–2004); Heather Tom (2007–present)
- Duration: 1987–1991; 1994–2001; 2003–2004; 2007–present
- First appearance: March 23, 1987
- Created by: William J. Bell
- Introduced by: William J. Bell and Lee Phillip Bell (1987); Bradley Bell (2007)
In-universe information
- Other names: Katherine Elizabeth Logan; Katie Spencer; Katie Forrester
- Occupation: Businesswoman; Public relations
- Family: Logan
- Father: Stephen Logan
- Mother: Beth Logan
- Brothers: Storm Logan
- Sisters: Brooke Logan; Donna Logan
- Husband: Bill Spencer Jr. (2009–2014, 2015–2016, 2025–present); Thorne Forrester (2018–2019)
- Sons: Will Spencer
- Grandmothers: Helen Logan
- Nephews: Rick Forrester; R.J. Forrester; Jack Marone; Marcus Forrester
- Nieces: Bridget Forrester; Hope Logan; Flo Logan

Katie Logan is a fictional character from The Bold and the Beautiful, an American soap opera on the CBS network. Portrayed by Nancy Sloan for much of her duration on the series, she is currently portrayed by Daytime Emmy Award winning actress, Heather Tom. She is the younger sister of Storm, Brooke and Donna Logan. The character is known for her relationship with Bill Spencer Jr. (Don Diamont).

== Casting ==
She was played by actress Nancy Sloan in a contract role from March 23, 1987 to March 17, 1989, was recurring from June 7, 1989, December 22, 1989, May 21 to 24, 1990, June 3 to 8, 1991, September 6, 1994 to May 14, 1998, and continued to make guest appearances from October 19, 1999 to November 15, 1999, February 1 and 2, 2000, April 10, 2000, January 12 to 17, 2001, April 30 to May 8, 2003, and May 28 to June 1, 2004. In 2007, the role of Katie was recast with Heather Tom, who made her debut on August 30, 2007. Tom had previously held roles on The Young and the Restless (Victoria Newman) and One Life to Live (Kelly Cramer). In 2008, Tom signed a contract with the series to ensure her stay until sometime in 2011. On her acting technique, Tom said "Well, my method is really just putting myself in the middle of the moment; the middle of the situation."

== Character development ==
In 2008, the show aired a controversial plot in which Katie was dying after being shot, and her brother Storm Logan (William deVry), who accidentally shot her, committed suicide to give her his heart. Tom says she wants to remind viewers of this event as much as she can; she told TV Guide, "I always make sure I wear a [prosthetic] chest scar whenever Katie's in something low-cut to remind people of that transplant story."

Throughout her marriage to Bill Spencer Jr. (Don Diamont), the couple have endured multiple challenges, including all of Bill's plotting to kill someone. Tom said "even though Katie 'left him' at one point, she never walked out on him in the regard where she's not trying to come back; trying to find her way back." Describing her as the girl who doesn't cut and run, additionally stating "It would take a lot for her to walk away from this relationship - she feels like this is the man she loves, she understands who she's married to - she knows she didn't marry a boy scout." Katie is someone to "correct" Bill and "love" him through his wrongdoing, according to the actress.

Bill nearly left his marriage to Katie for Steffy Forrester (Jacqueline MacInnes Wood), but Katie, a heart transplant recipient, had another heart attack when she learnt of the news. According to the actress, "The idea that Bill would cross the line with Steffy is totally foreign to Katie. She just doesn't believe it's possible." Explaining how it happened, Tom said "Taylor (Hunter Tylo) comes over and says, “Listen, your husband and my daughter are involved.” And Katie’s, like, “Your daughter is sick and needs help. She’s obsessed with my husband and she’s living in a fantasy world!” But it’s at that point that a seed of doubt is planted, since Taylor is not the type to make stuff up. Then when Bill comes in I have this two-page monologue where Katie tells him what Taylor said and through it all Bill says nothing. It becomes clearer and clearer that things are not the way Katie thinks they are."

Tom liked how Katie wasn't written as "the pathetic victim" in confrontation against Bill for cheating, which she described as "very raw, physical and ugly" and some of the best material she's "ever had". Katie survived, and reunited with Bill. Katie and Steffy became enemies, Tom said "I couldn't ask for a better nemesis", explaining "it's much more interesting to watch a fight between two equals, rather than watch a fight with someone who always gets to win or who is always right." Despite the couple reuniting, Tom noted that "she's going to be left with some major trust issues when it comes to men. It's a huge breach." In 2012, Tom's pregnancy was written into the storyline when Katie became pregnant with her first child. However, the pregnancy was high risk and Katie could have died. When Katie nearly died, she begged Bill to save the baby.

== Storylines ==
=== 1987–2004 ===
Born on May 29, Katie is the youngest daughter of Stephen (Patrick Duffy) and Beth Logan (Robin Riker). She has three siblings: Storm (William deVry), Brooke (Katherine Kelly Lang), and Donna Logan (Jennifer Gareis). During her teenage years, Katie suffered from acne, causing her to have low self-esteem. She became jealous of her sisters for their success and beauty, but still was close with them. Donna convinced her friend Rocco Carner (Bryan Genesse) to date Katie. Katie developed feelings for Rocco but was devastated when he kissed Donna. Nonetheless, she continued to go on dates with Rocco until she found out he wanted to propose to Donna. She then developed a crush on her classmate, Kurt. Against Brooke and Storm's wishes, Katie and Donna tracked down Stephen who had been estranged from the family for years. He reunited with their mother, Beth, and they moved to Paris. Katie served as babysitter for Brooke's children.

=== 2007–present ===
In August 2007, Katie returns to Los Angeles to attend Donna's upcoming wedding to Thorne Forrester (Winsor Harmon). Katie became suspicious about Donna's motives for marrying Thorne, given that Donna despises Thorne's mother Stephanie (Susan Flannery), and would do anything to get revenge on her mother-in-law to be. On the day of the wedding, Katie overhears Donna confiding to her friend Jackie (Lesley-Anne Down) that she was not really in love with Thorne. Katie informed Thorne of this and he called off the wedding. Donna briefly disowns Katie for her betrayal, while Katie appears to have struck up a friendship with a grateful Stephanie, who thinks of her as "the only decent Logan on the family tree." Having lived in the shadow of her older sisters for years, Katie acts the voice of reason towards her sisters. Katie becomes a member of the Forrester Creations team by working in their Public Relations department, having had PR experience whilst away from Los Angeles. Recently, Katie and Jake Maclaine had discovered videotaped evidence that might show that her father, Stephen, may have shot Stephanie at the Forrester fashion show. This situation has strained relations between her and her father. However, she and Brooke later discovered that it wasn't Stephen, but their brother, Storm, who had shot Stephanie. Despite the shocking revelation, Stephen insisted on taking the blame for Storm, to alleviate all the stress he seemed to have bottled up. Katie was stunned, but still offered her support to Storm. When Stephanie planned to tell the police about Storm shooting her, it was Katie who eventually persuaded Mrs. Forrester to not do so; which she didn't, and Storm was eventually cleared of the charges.

Katie then saw that Brooke was on the verge of ruining her engagement to Ridge when Brooke discovered that she was the biological mother of Nick and Taylor's baby Jack. Katie wanted Brooke to finally commit to a life with Ridge so she convinced Brooke's daughter Bridget to rekindle her relationship with Nick. However, while babysitting baby Jack, Katie found herself attracted to Nick. Once she told Bridget, she accused it of being a harmless crush and let it go. While struggling with a gun that her brother Storm had, the gun went off, injuring Katie. Katie was originally on a heart and lung machine until Storm committed suicide so he could let Katie have his heart. After defibrillation, Katie's donated heart started beating, and she was alive thanks to her brother's heart.

Katie's body begins rejecting the heart not long after and prognosis looks grim. She begins taking anti-rejection medicine. Thinking that her death is inevitable, her family help to set up a lovely prom night for her, (her dress was a Forrester Original which had been brought over by Eric's friend, and Nick's mother, Jackie) wherein Nick and Katie had a nice time. Stephanie also sat up with Katie, helping her through her situation, because she had always gotten on well with her. Despite all the best medical help, Katie's condition continued to deteriorate. Until Katie's niece, Bridget, discovered a cool gene therapy, which had been done in Stockholm that could perhaps help. With the aide of her doctor, Bridget put the therapy to work, and was pleased that it was successful. The therapy broke her fever, and although it still meant Katie had to take her anti-rejection medication, the crisis had seemed to pass.

Katie continues to have feelings for Nick, but stood aside so that Bridget and Nick could wed. She officiated at their wedding on July 14. On Friday, August 1, during a routinely check-up, Katie learns that she is pregnant. She and Nick have decided to keep their baby. In September, Nick told Bridget of Katie's pregnancy. Bridget immediately left Nick and their marriage telling her husband and aunt that she is "finally free of both of you." Katie lost her baby and is currently focusing on Nick's son, Jack. However, in a kind of ironic twist, where her sisters Brooke and Donna have always had their share of troubles and antagonism with Stephanie Forrester, Katie has the same kind of antagonistic relationship with Jackie Marone, the mother of her fiance, Nick. Jackie has made no secret of her wish that Nick and Bridget get back together and resume their marriage, because she has always liked Bridget and thinks she would be better for Nick, and thus finds Katie to be less than suitable for her son. Because of this, the two have had their share of arguments and spats. Since then, Katie and Nick have broken up and Nick has reunited with Bridget.

Katie's romantic life did not remain calm for long, as she started dating bad boy Bill Spencer shortly after his failed stint at romancing her sister, Donna. The romance with Katie and Bill was highly unexpected, and highly unlike, due to Spencer's desire to steal Forrester Creations from the Forresters—and Logans. After hooking up with Bill, Katie was appointed the new CEO of Forrester Creations, which was a newly acquired division of Spencer Publications. Bill's motives towards her were unclear to Katie, especially after she saw a DVD that was made by Bill's father, Bill Spencer Sr., that he had left to his son, asking Bill Jr., to take down Eric Forrester, Donna and Brooke Logan, after what they had done to the woman he truly loved, Stephanie Forrester. Katie then got Bill's word that he was not using or romancing her to pursue his father's vendetta against the Forresters. They then got married in Katie's old neighborhood, with their nearest and dearest alongside them. Bill's sister Karen, Katie's mother and father Beth and Stephen, were those who were especially there for the ceremony.

In 2010, is it revealed that Bill fathered a son, Liam Cooper. After a DNA test confirms this, Katie helps Bill adjust to his role of being a father. The following year, Bill has an affair with Steffy Forrester, and decides to leave Katie. However, after a vow renewal ceremony set up by Katie, he decides to break things off with Steffy and return to Katie. When Katie finds out about the short-lived affair, she has a heart attack.

Following Steffy's marriage to Liam, Katie is forced to deal with her ambivalence of not wanting her in the family. Bill and Steffy manipulatively work together to cover up their work of trying to keep Liam for reuniting with his former girlfriend, Katie's niece Hope Logan. Katie finds out and helps Liam and Hope upon their reunion, though her relationship with Bill weakens as his disapproval of Hope grows. However, Katie and Bill are brought closer upon the news of Katie's pregnancy. Though high-risk, Katie goes ahead with the pregnancy, and nearly dies while delivering William "Will" Spencer. The shock causes her to develop postpartum depression. During this period, she runs away and tries to have Bill leave her to be with his sister Brooke, whom Katie feels will be a better mother and wife. With the help of psychiatrist Taylor Hayes, Katie soon overcomes her depression, and returns to her life with Bill. This is, however, without the knowledge that Bill and Brooke have fallen in love and kissed. Katie learns this but decides to let it go, taking her own actions into account. Katie leaves Bill after believing that he had possibly slept with Brooke, though this was not the case. However, once Katie left Brooke's house, Bill and Brooke succumbed to their feelings and slept together. Bill returned to Katie upon news that she had another heart attack after realizing that she made a mistake by leaving him.

Katie once again resumes her happy life with Bill and Will. Brooke discovers that she is pregnant with Bill's child, but suffers a miscarriage shortly thereafter. At a birthday party for Brooke thrown by Katie, Taylor, who had been snooping around due to suspicions of Brooke and Bill's relationship, revealed to everyone that Brooke miscarried Bill's child. Katie then leaves Bill and takes over his company, Spencer Publications. Her relationship with Brooke is also damaged. Ridge Forrester returns to town to reunite with Brooke. But Brooke confesses what happened with Bill and Ridge goes to comfort Katie. The two strike up a deep friendship and soon fall in love, almost kissing. However, Katie, not wanting to be like Brooke (who she forgave after divorcing Bill), tells Ridge to marry Brooke. Ridge and Brooke get engaged and Katie is the maid-of-honor, but then she and Ridge hear Carter's poem about love that they had read to each other. Katie pretends to faint from a heart symptom to stop the wedding and confesses to Ridge that he is the love of her life and she could not let him marry her sister. Hope learns from Liam (who saw Katie almost kiss Ridge and encouraged her to pursue him) that Ridge and Katie have feelings for each other. Hope brings Brooke to her business trip in Paris so Katie and Ridge have time to sort things out. But while away, the couple kisses for the first time and confess their love, deciding to tell Brooke once she returns. Brooke comes back to marry Ridge but is in disbelief when she learns the truth. Later she tries to seduce Ridge, but he tells Brooke he belongs with Katie and no longer loves her. Ridge then goes home to Katie and they make love for the first time. In a revenge scheme, Brooke takes back Bill and manages to oust Katie from Spencer Publications and put Bill back in power. Ridge later proposes to Katie, with a red ribbon around her finger instead of a ring, and she accepts. However, Ridge is upset to hear that Bill plans on marrying Brooke in Abu Dhabi after a trip to Dubai. At first, everyone tries convincing Katie that Ridge really wants Brooke, but Ridge reveals that he doesn't want Bill around RJ. He eventually learns from Quinn that she slept with Bill, and tells Katie. Ridge goes to Abu Dhabi and stops the wedding, telling Brooke the truth. He tries to take her back to LA, but Bill tells the pilot-Justin-to make Ridge fall out. Ridge falls into the Persian Gulf, and goes missing for weeks. Katie blames Quinn, who is fired from Forrester Creations. Katie flies to Abu Dhabi, but Ridge eventually comes back. He doesn't remember his romance with Katie until she recites part of "their poem", and he finishes it. They go back to LA, but his concussion prevents him from drawing as well as he used to. Eventually, he remembers that Justin flew the helicopter and figures out Bill was behind his accident. He convinces Katie and they tell Brooke, but she doesn't believe them and plans to wed Bill in Catalina. Then, Deacon gets evidence from Bill's employee, Allison, implicating Bill in the plot. He tells Katie and Ridge. While Ridge goes to bring Bill to confess the truth, Katie tries to inform her sister about what Bill did and begs her not to marry him. Brooke refuses to listen, but Ridge eventually gets a confession out of Bill and brings him to see Brooke.

In 2018, Katie begins dating Thorne Forrester, her sister Brooke's ex-husband and brother of her own former fiancé, Ridge. Thorne convinces Katie to go after full custody of her son with Bill, given that Bill had neglected to spend time with little Will as of late. To secure Katie's chances, Thorne and Katie get married. Full custody is awarded to Katie, but acrimony between the Forrester brothers and Bill ensues. A fight breaks out between Bill, Ridge and Thorne; Bill ends up falling over his house's balcony and is currently in a coma.

== Reception ==
"Everyone is in Italy except for me! I just woke up and was getting ready to go to a yoga class [...] It's very exciting," she adds. "I kind of debated whether I wanted to go into the [Outstanding Lead Actress] category this year but I'm glad I did. I've been doing daytime for 22 years and it's time. What the heck, I'll play with the big girls!"

— Tom discusses her award nomination. (2012)

Tom has received a number of honors for her portrayal of Katie, including a Daytime Emmy Award nomination in 2008 for Outstanding Supporting Actress in a Drama Series, she later won for the same category in 2011. Tom's performance also earned her two Daytime Emmy Award wins for Outstanding Lead Actress in a Drama Series in 2012 and 2013, being nominated in 2014, 2017 and 2019. She gained a pre-nomination in the same category in 2015. In June 2020, she received another win for Outstanding Lead Actress in a Drama Series for her work as Katie.

In 2022, Charlie Mason from Soaps She Knows placed Katie fourth on his ranked list of The Bold and the Beautiful’s Best of the Best Characters Ever, commenting "Since the formidable Heather Tom stepped into the role of the supposed “ugly duckling” of the Logan family, the heroine has spread her wings and taken flight in ways that neither her sisters nor we dreamt she would when she was first introduced!"
