= Stephanie Forrester (The Bold and the Beautiful) =

Fictional character from The Bold and the Beautiful

- The Bold and the Beautiful character
- Portrayed by: Susan Flannery (1987–2018); Danielle Chuchran (2006)
- Duration: 1987–2012; 2018
- First appearance: March 24, 1987
- Last appearance: February 9, 2018
- Introduced by: William J. Bell
- Crossover appearances: The Young and the Restless
In-universe information
- Other names: Stephanie Douglas; Stevie; Liz; Steph
- Occupation: Businesswoman; Coffeehouse owner
- Family: Forrester family
- Father: John Douglas
- Mother: Ann Douglas
- Sisters: Pamela Douglas
- Husband: Eric Forrester (1957–1990, 1999–2005, 2006–2008, 2012)
- Sons: Ridge Forrester; Thorne Forrester
- Daughters: Angela Forrester; Kristen Forrester; Felicia Forrester
- Stepchildren: Rick Forrester; Bridget Forrester
- Grandsons: Thomas Forrester; R.J. Forrester; Zende Forrester Dominguez (adoptive); Dino Damiano
- Granddaughters: Steffy Forrester; Phoebe Forrester; Aly Forrester
- Other relatives: Douglas Forrester; Kelly Spencer; Hayes Finnegan

Stephanie Forrester is a fictional character from The Bold and the Beautiful, an American soap opera on the CBS network. She is known as a strong woman who acts decisively and sometimes also controversially, to protect her children and her marriage to the famed fashion designer Eric Forrester. Her tendency to be an overprotective mother stems from the abuse Stephanie suffered as a child at the hands of her father John Douglas.

Stephanie had a long-standing rivalry with Brooke Logan, who at first was a serious competitor for Eric's love, and later was involved with her two sons Ridge and Thorne. She had also rivalries with other women that were competitors for Eric's love, such as Margo Lynley, Beth Logan, Sheila Carter, Sally Spectra, Maggie Forrester, Lauren Fenmore, Jackie Marone and Donna Logan, but with some of them, she also developed friendships (like Brooke, Sally, Maggie, Lauren and Jackie). She had also rivalries with Deveney Dixon, who at first was pretend to be her daughter Angela, and later was involved with her son Thorne, and Morgan DeWitt who was involved with her son Ridge, and even got pregnant from him when both was young, but Stephanie took her to have an abortion at the clinic. Stephanie had also a good friendship with her daughter-in-law Taylor Hayes, and she always preferred her over her second daughter-in-law Brooke. Out of respect for friendship with Stephanie, Taylor was involved with Eric only after her death.

Stephanie was portrayed (since the show's inception in 1987) by Emmy-winning actress Susan Flannery. Stephanie's lung cancer diagnosis played a central role in the series, and the character died of the disease on November 26, 2012.

== Casting and creation ==
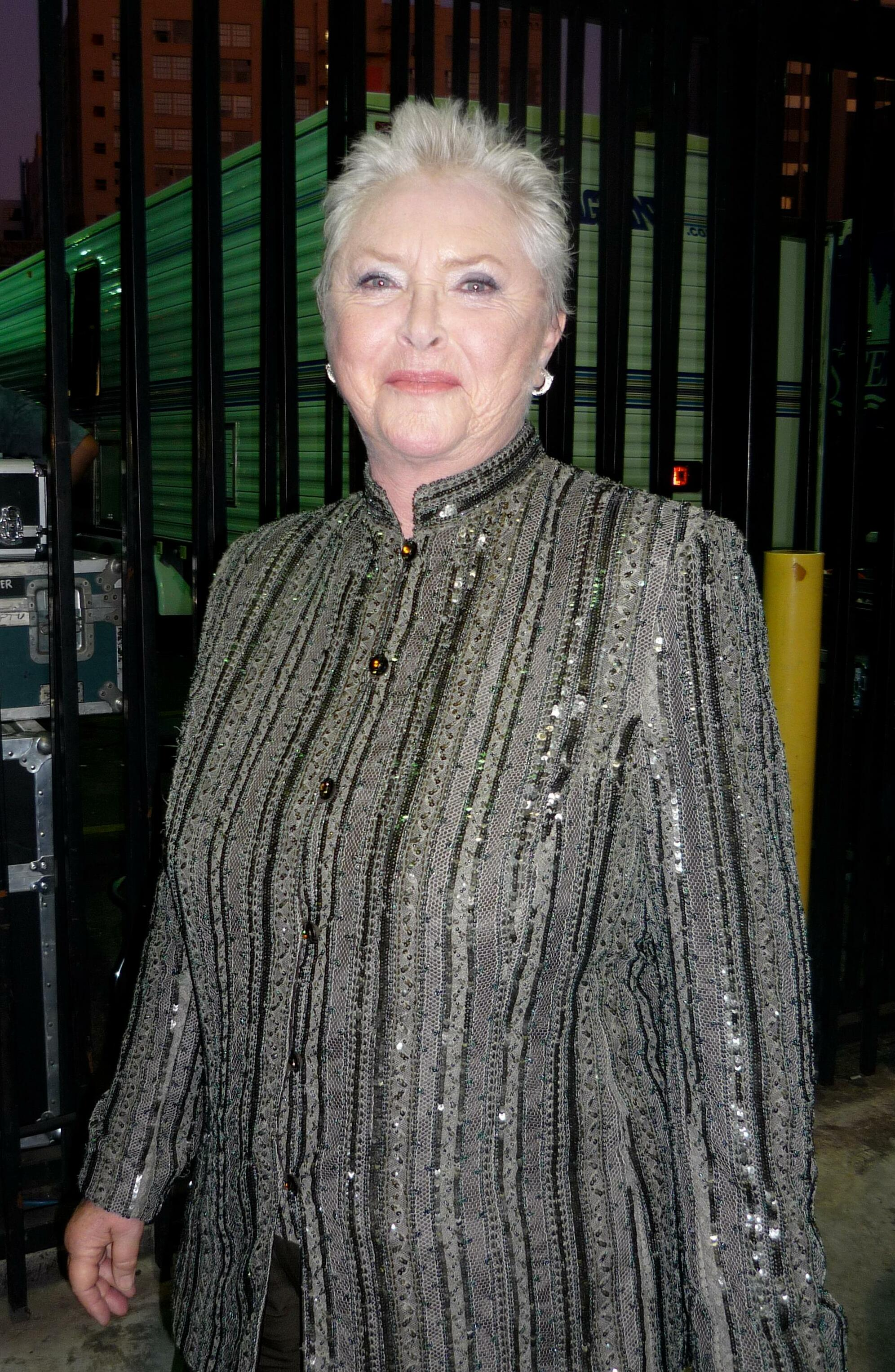
Susan Flannery played Stephanie for 25 years

The role of Stephanie was created for actress Susan Seaforth Hayes (who played Julie Olson Williams on Days of Our Lives) but Hayes turned it down. The producers then contacted Hayes' former Days co-star, Susan Flannery, and she eventually won the role. Hayes did, however, appear in 2003 and 2005 as Joanna Manning, the mother of Lauren Fenmore. Flannery initially did not want the role and the producers had to ask her three times to come in and talk about the role. Jane Elliot had been contacted by producer Gail Kobe for the Stephanie role, but at the behest of creator William J. Bell, Flannery was cast. Stephanie was played from the show's beginning in 1987 by Flannery, who also directed some of the show's episodes. In September 2007, Flannery asked for a medical leave, as she had fibromyalgia.

Flannery, along with John McCook as Eric Forrester, Katherine Kelly Lang as Brooke Logan and Ronn Moss as Ridge Forrester were referred to as the "core four", having been in the series from the start. However, on August 11, 2012, it was announced that after twenty-five years, Moss would be leaving the show, breaking up the core four, and leaving Flannery, Kelly Lang, and McCook as the sole remaining characters from the show's inception. On October 10, 2012, it was announced that Flannery had decided to quit the show also, after twenty-five years. During a 2012 interview with TV Guide, Bradley Bell announced that Stephanie's character would die of cancer. Bell said: "It is huge. And amazing. I knew this day was coming but I've been in denial about it. I've been loving and treasuring every one of these last few days we have with Susan." Flannery signed an extension to her contract that would allow the show time to build a storyline surrounding her exit. Stephanie departed on November 26, 2012, and reappeared in video recordings on December 7 and 10, 2012.

On February 9, 2018, Flannery was heard (but not seen) in a cameo as the voice of Stephanie on Brooke and Ridge's wedding day.

== Character development ==
Bradley Bell said that Stephanie: "has always been a woman of great strength and character." She is known for her long-running feud with Brooke Logan (Katherine Kelly Lang). However, in recent times, it has calmed down and they are extremely close. Bell has stated that: "Stephanie and Brooke are the true supercouple of B&B."

"I wanted to create the biggest mountain possible for Stephanie to overcome. It's the weightiest, most intimate and difficult thing she has ever had to wrestle with and to have to share it with Brooke is torture. This is a story about a highly functioning woman that will delve deeply into issues of self-worth and denial. But it's not going to be morbid or depressing. Stephanie is determined to party right into her grave. It'll be a hell of a lot of fun to watch."

— executive producer and head writer Brad Bell, during an interview with TV Guide on the storyline

During a confrontation with Brooke, Stephanie collapsed. On September 24, 2010, after being taken to the hospital, Stephanie was diagnosed with stage 4 lung cancer. Brooke became the only person to know this secret; instead of "rejoicing" that her nemesis and arch-rival may soon be out of the picture, she became a confidant and motivator to Stephanie. At first, Stephanie refused treatment. Head writer and executive producer of The Bold and the Beautiful, Brad Bell, said that this was because she felt that her family and the family company (Forrester Creations) no longer needed her. Bell also said that "She'd rather die than be the center of attention." When asked about the development of the storyline, Flannery, herself a colon cancer survivor, said that the advice she offered head writer Brad Bell was to allow Stephanie to keep a sense of humor during her battle with cancer. Stephanie then created a goofy bucket list; Bell said that this was all a part of her denial, and wanting to focus on something else other than her cancer.

As part of the story, Stephanie befriends a young woman, Dayzee Leigh (Kristolyn Lloyd) who gives her a new perspective, and convinces her to undergo treatment. Dayzee lived on skid row in Los Angeles; Stephanie wanted to survive her cancer to advocate for poverty after learning more about it. During this stage of the storyline, there was much speculation that Flannery was leaving the show, and that Stephanie would be killed off. During an interview with TV Guide in February 2011, she explained:

When word first got out at CBS, a lot of people came over from The Young and the Restless — which shoots just across the hall from us — and they were saying, "Susan, are you really leaving the show? Is Brad nuts?" And I said, "Well, you never know what's going to happen in this business!

The storyline raised awareness about cancer, as well as the Union Rescue Mission through Dayzee's character. In 2012, Stephanie learns the cancer had returned, and according to Bell: "She receives the diagnosis that the cancer has spread and that there is no chance for survival." Stephanie decided to throw a party which would be the last time she sees her loved ones.

== Storylines ==
Stephanie Douglas Forrester is the matriarch of the Forrester fashion dynasty and the mother of five children: Ridge, Thorne, Kristen, Felicia, and Angela. Eventually her husband Eric Forrester became interested in other women such as Margo Lynley and his former college love, Beth Logan. Eric dated Beth years earlier in college but left her when Stephanie became pregnant. Eric found Beth catering a party one night and reconnected with her. Stephanie decided against an affair with gigolo Clarke Garrison, whom Stephanie had hired to date Kristen. Stephanie was also enraged when Ridge began romancing Beth's daughter Brooke. Stephanie had mysterious absences. It was revealed she was visiting a comatose brain damaged girl; It was Angela, the daughter Stephanie had, who she said died at birth. The couple grew closer over Angela. However, it was revealed that the doctor hired an actress to play Angela to get money from the Forresters; and the real Angela had in fact died. The fake Angela escaped. Stephanie also had to deal with her warring sons, Thorne and Ridge, who were both in love with Caroline Spencer, Thorne's wife.

Stephanie lost it when her other son, Thorne, got involved with Brooke. Stephanie terrorized Brooke at the Big Bear cabin with a fire poker before punching her and trying to strangle her. But Thorne proposed to Brooke, and Stephanie had a stroke. In the hospital, Stephanie again tried to choke Brooke. The stroke made Eric reevaluate his feelings for Stephanie, and he remarried Stephanie at her bedside. Brooke tried to make inroads with the wheelchair-using Stephanie by massaging Stephanie's feet. Brooke and Thorne's ex-wife, Macy Alexander, were battling over Thorne and got into a car accident, where Macy died in an explosion. Macy's mother, Sally, exposed Thorne's continuing involvement with Brooke at Macy's funeral, and Stephanie had a second stroke. Stephanie softened toward Brooke a bit when Brooke gave Stephanie a photo album documenting Stephanie's life.

Years before, Stephanie had forced teenaged Morgan DeWitt to abort Ridge's baby. Morgan came back and befriended Ridge's wife, Taylor, in a scheme to again carry Ridge's child. Morgan faked a series of e-mails between Ridge and Taylor to make it seem like Taylor gave Ridge "permission" to impregnate Morgan. After Taylor found out and Morgan lost the baby, Morgan kidnapped Taylor's daughter, Steffy Forrester, and imprisoned Taylor. Morgan escaped after Ridge rescued Taylor and Steffy, but showed up as a clown for a Forrester kiddie party. Morgan fell into the pool and Stephanie left her to drown, but later Morgan tried to drown Stephanie in her bathtub. Stephanie survived, and later mended fences with her daughter, Kristen, after Kristen got involved with the HIV-positive Antonio Dominguez.

Massimo Marone, Stephanie's childhood friend and first love, came back to romance Stephanie, who wasn't interested. But when Ridge lost blood in an accident, it turned out that Ridge and Eric's blood types didn't match, and Massimo was revealed as Ridge's father. Meanwhile, Brooke, who couldn't have Ridge, had an affair with Deacon Sharpe, her daughter's husband. Stephanie was outraged, but later, Stephanie tried to help Brooke turn over a new leaf and even helped deliver baby Hope at the Big Bear cabin with Bridget.

Stephanie and Massimo saved Amber after Sheila kidnapped Amber to make way for Sheila's daughter, Erica Lovejoy. But when Taylor died in an altercation with Sheila, Stephanie was devastated, and the repercussions included Ridge, who'd been told of his paternity by Massimo, considering a relationship with Bridget, which forced the issue of Ridge's paternity. Stephanie finally told Eric that Massimo was Ridge's father, and Eric walked out on her. Stephanie warned Jackie Marone to stay away from Eric, although Stephanie encouraged Jackie's son, Nick Marone, to be with Brooke, and arranged for Nick and Brooke to be stranded on an island together. After Sally and Stephanie, who had become friends, drowned their sorrows, a soused Sally gave Stephanie a sloppy haircut. For Christmas, Stephanie gave Sally a locket with both their pictures inside.

Stephanie and Brooke bonded briefly when Ridge was believed to be dead. Later, when Thorne defected to Spectra, Stephanie apologized for having always played favorites with Ridge. Stephanie worried when Ridge claimed he had seen Taylor, but Taylor was indeed alive, having been spirited away from the hospital by Prince Omar, who healed Taylor in his palace and held her prisoner. Stephanie paid off a doctor and faked a heart attack to manipulate Ridge into returning to Taylor. The ploy worked, but when Brooke uncovered it, the entire Forrester family turned their backs on Stephanie.

Stephanie was about to leave Los Angeles when she found papers in Eric's safe that said Stephanie was the true owner of Forrester Creations. When it came out that Eric had known about it for decades, Stephanie kneed Eric in the groin, fired him, and installed Thorne as president. Meanwhile, Bridget was hurt when Brooke moved on with Bridget's ex-husband, Nick. Stephanie responded by giving Brooke a gift-wrapped gun with which to shoot herself. Instead, Brooke fired at Stephanie, but missed. Stephanie was stunned when Eric remarried Brooke to keep her away from Nick. But Eric and Stephanie drew together and remarried for the sake of their daughter, Felicia, who had cancer. Felicia "died," but Stephanie secretly forced an unconscious Felicia to have chemotherapy against Felicia's wishes, and the treatment was successful.

The low point of the Forrester-Logan feud was when Stephanie convinced Ridge to go for full custody of Ridge Jr and Hope Logan. Stephanie was convinced that Brooke would get in bed with a guy because he was available and Brooke was easy. So after following Brooke Logan to a bar she told a stranger, Andy, Brooke was lonely and needed company. When the stranger seemed hesitant, Stephanie let it be known that Brooke was a girl from the Valley and revealed Brooke kept a house key under the doormat. Within a week Brooke was raped when Andy used the house key. Ridge dropped the custody case. When Eric, Ridge, and Brooke found out Stephanie's role in Brooke's attack, Stephanie left town, to coincide with Susan Flannery's medical leave. Stephanie came back to ask for forgiveness and everyone soon learned about Brooke being raped and Stephanie's hand in it. In the end, Stephanie would be shot at the end of Forrester Creations Fashion show by Storm Logan, who had suppressed years of anger and resentment toward his father for abandoning his family decades earlier.

After Eric had an affair with Donna Logan he divorced Stephanie and married Donna then forced Stephanie out of Forrester Creations. Stephanie became a partner at Jackie M Designs. Stephanie attended the reading of the will of her good friend Bill Spencer. Bill's daughter Karen Spencer delivered a note that offered his respect to Stephanie over the years and asked that she mentor Karen just as she did Karen's twin sister Caroline. Stephanie enacted her revenge on Eric and Donna via a webcast titled The Logan Chronicles at Spencer Publications by working with Bill Spencer, Jr. Bill eventually took over Forrester Creations obeying his father's final wishes to avenge Stephanie. Ridge's daughter Steffy regained control of Forrester Creations by nearly seducing him and split the ownership between Ridge, Eric, Stephanie, and Taylor. Stephanie felt compelled to leave Jackie M and return to Forrester. Eric let Stephanie stay at the Forrester mansion, where she encountered Donna's mother, Beth, who was suffering from the latter stages of Alzheimer's disease. Stephanie and Beth had an argument at the Forrester pool that resulted in Beth drowning after Stephanie walked away. Donna wanted Stephanie arrested, a conflict which ended Donna and Eric's marriage and sent Eric back to Stephanie. Stephen tried to avenge Beth by seducing Stephanie's sister Pam into going off her medication. Stephen put a gun in Pam's hand and pushed for Pam to shoot Stephanie, but Stephanie got the gun away from Pam and shot Stephen instead.

Stephanie fought for her granddaughter Steffy's marriage to Liam Cooper, who was revealed to be Bill Spencer, Jr.'s son, warning him to think carefully but to finally choose between Hope and Steffy. Eric was looking for a way to celebrate 50 years with Stephanie, so when Sally's old friend, Gladys Pope (Phyllis Diller), arrived as a gardener who could also perform marriages, Stephanie remarried Eric in an impromptu and very informal ceremony at the Forrester mansion. In October 2012, Doctor Lewis told Stephanie that her lung cancer has returned. Despite the desperate pleas of her family and friends, Stephanie refused to accept treatment; she decided instead that she would like to enjoy her final days. An Irish-themed party was thrown in her honor. She was last left under Brooke's care after saying good-bye to all her loved ones. On November 26, 2012, Stephanie died of cancer lakeside at Big Bear cabin after asking Brooke to sing her to sleep in her arms.

== Reception ==
In 2022, Charlie Mason from Soaps She Knows placed Stephanie first on his ranked list of The Bold and the Beautiful’s Best of the Best Characters Ever, commenting "Never in the history of daytime television, much less the history of The Bold and the Beautiful, has any character stung quite as hard as three-time Emmy winner Susan Flannery’s queen bee. Eric can hang whomever’s portrait he wants in the living room, but for our money, that space now and always shall belong to his first wife." In 2024, Mason from included Stephanie in his list of the worst mothers in American soap operas, calling her a "domineering mama" who would "grizzly lie to son Thorne that she loves all her kids equally — even though we all know that Ridge was her favorite. Followed by Felicia, the blonde girl, Angela, Fake Angela and then, finally, Thorne." Mason also placed Stephanie sixth on his ranked list of Soaps' 40 Most Iconic Characters of All Time, writing, "Beware the queen bee's sting! From 1987–2012, Susan Flannery packed a punch — often literally — as the domineering matriarch of the fashion-forward Forrester family".
