= List of The Bold and the Beautiful characters introduced in the 1980s =

The Bold and the Beautiful is a long-running American soap opera which has aired on CBS Daytime since March 23, 1987. The following section comprises past and current characters that have appeared on the show that debuted between 1987 and 1989.

== Bill Spencer ==
Bill Spencer
- The Bold and the Beautiful character
- Portrayed by: Jim Storm
- Duration: 1987–94; 1997; 2000; 2003; 2009
- First appearance: Episode 1 March 23, 1987
- Last appearance: Episode 5674; October 20, 2009
- Created by: William J. Bell
In-universe information
- Occupation: Founder, Chairman and CEO of Spencer Publications; Owner of Spectra Fashions
- Family: Spencer
- Wife: Marion Spencer (until 1985); Margo Maclaine Lynley (1988–90)
- Sons: Bill Spencer Jr.
- Daughters: Caroline Forrester; Karen Spencer
- Grandsons: Wyatt Spencer; Liam Spencer; Will Spencer
- Granddaughters: Caroline Spencer

William "Bill" Spencer is a fictional character from the CBS Daytime soap opera, The Bold and the Beautiful. The character appeared regularly from 1987 through 1994, with several brief appearances afterwards, and was portrayed by Jim Storm.

Bill is overprotective of Caroline and strongly objects when she falls in love with Ridge Forrester, the playboy son of the famous fashion designer, Eric Forrester, and his wife, Stephanie. He forbids Ridge from continuing to date his daughter. The headstrong Ridge responds by proposing to her. Just before the wedding ceremony, Bill tells Caroline that he had Ridge followed and knows for a fact that he slept with another woman just a week before. She is furious with her father and goes on with the wedding, walking down the aisle alone. But before she gets to Ridge, she faints.

Bill's efforts are successful, Caroline doesn't marry Ridge. Later, tragedy strikes. Caroline is raped by a man named Ron Deacon. Bill notices how Ridge's younger brother, Thorne, supports her through her recovery. Bill wants Caroline to marry him, and she does. But she's still in love with Ridge, and despite all Bill's efforts to prevent it, she divorces Thorne to reunite with Ridge.

Caroline eventually marries Ridge, but afterwards becomes ill with leukemia. Bill is devastated when she dies. Bill tells his lover Margo Lynley about his other daughter Karen. Margo enlists the help of Blake Hayes, who eventually tracks Karen down in Texas, where she goes by the name of Faith Roberts. Bill and Karen are soon reunited. Despite Margo being pregnant by scheming fashion designer, Clarke Garrison. Bill and Margo marry, and Bill adopts the baby. But their marriage does not last, and Margo leaves town with the child.

Bill moves to New York City where he builds Spencer Publications into an international media conglomerate and gains a reputation for being enormously wealthy and extremely ruthless in business. In 2009, Bill is diagnosed with a terminal illness. It's revealed that Bill fathered a previously unknown illegitimate son. In his will, Bill gives Donna Logan a small jeweled container that was empty inside, a symbol of his opinion of Donna. Clarke received a gold medal made of chocolate with a note that read "as fake as your designs". He wills Spencer Publications to his two living children, Karen and Bill Jr., who each receive 50% and are named co-CEOs. Karen gave Stephanie a final letter from Bill that he wanted Karen to deliver personally. Bill offered his respect for Stephanie over the years, congratulated her on her new partnership at Jackie M Designs and asked her to mentor Karen in business and personally just as she did with Caroline.

Bill also makes a DVD for his son in which he gives him half of Spencer Publications on the condition that Bill Jr. use the company to avenge Stephanie, whom Bill reveals to be his true love, by taking over Forrester Creations and crushing Eric. Bill reveals Stephanie refused to leave her husband thus nothing happened between them but that he was heartbroken when Eric humiliated Stephanie with his public affairs with Brooke Logan and Donna Logan then fired her from the company she co-founded.

In May 2012, Karen reveals to Bill Jr. she has been in a long-term relationship with Danielle after years of being forced by their father to hide her orientation. Karen also reveals Bill threatened to disown and disinherit her, refused to meet Danielle or acknowledge that Karen had a partner, and attempted to marry her to a junior executive at Spencer Publications for show. Bill and Karen agreed to keep her secret from everyone, including his son Bill Jr. Bill's granddaughter Caroline Spencer reveals to her boyfriend Thomas Forrester that Bill had only met her twice, once on New Year's and once on the Fourth of July. Thomas tells Caroline that he always heard that Bill was a "powerhouse".

== Rocco Carner ==
Rocco Carner was played by Bryan Genesse from 1987 to 1989. Prior to his exit, Rocco was involved in a love triangle with sisters Katie and Donna Logan, and bought a ring to propose to Donna. In 2009, Genesse returned to the series. Upon his return on March 12, 2009, it was revealed that Rocco stayed in contact with the Forresters.

== Kristen Forrester Dominguez ==
Kristen Forrester Dominguez
- The Bold and the Beautiful character
- Portrayed by: Teri Ann Linn (1987–1994); Tracy Melchior (2001–2017)
- Duration: 1987–1990; 1992–1994; 2001–2004; 2006; 2008; 2012–2013; 2017
- First appearance: Episode 7 March 31, 1987
- Last appearance: February 16, 2017
- Created by: William J. Bell
In-universe information
- Occupation: Fashion designer
- Family: Forrester family
- Father: Eric Forrester
- Mother: Stephanie Forrester
- Brothers: Thorne Forrester; Ridge Forrester
- Sisters: Felicia Forrester; Angela Forrester
- Half-brothers: Rick Forrester; Marcus Forrester (adoptive)
- Half-sisters: Bridget Forrester
- Husband: Clarke Garrison (1988–90); Antonio Domínguez (2001–)
- Adoptive sons: Zende Forrester Dominguez
- Grandfathers: John Douglas
- Grandmothers: Ann Douglas
- Uncles: John Forrester
- Aunts: Pamela Douglas
- Nephews: Thomas Forrester; R.J. Forrester; Dino Damiano; Logan Knight
- Nieces: Steffy Forrester; Aly Forrester; Rosie Forrester (adoptive); Lizzy Forrester; Phoebe Forrester
- First cousins: Jessica Forrester; Ivy Forrester
- Other relatives: Electra Forrester

Kristen Forrester Dominguez is the older daughter of Eric Forrester and Stephanie Forrester. At the show's beginning, she was portrayed by Teri Ann Linn. People magazine reported the character to be a "rich bitch". Of her casting, Linn said, "This is an opportunity I had to take". Meridith Brown, an editor of Soap Opera Digest, predicted that Linn would be a "breakaway star" and nasty characters like Kristen "are ones that become very popular in daytime." Linn departed on February 26, 1990, with additional appearances from May 20 to September 10, 1992, April 26 to May 7, 1993 and September 23 to October 4, 1994. Tracy Melchior has played Kristen on and off since 2001. The character resides in Florida, and only comes to Los Angeles for significant events. She most recently appeared at a Christmas party with the other Forresters in December 2013 and then in February 2017 for Zende's wedding.

== Beth Logan ==
Beth Logan
- The Bold and the Beautiful character
- Portrayed by: Judith Baldwin (1987); Nancy Burnett (1987–1990, 1994–2001); Marla Adams (1990–1991); Robin Riker (2008–2010)
- Duration: 1987–1991; 1994; 1996–1998; 2001; 2008–2010
- First appearance: March 25, 1987
- Last appearance: April 19, 2010
- Created by: William J. Bell
- Introduced by: William J. Bell and Lee Phillip Bell
In-universe information
- Other names: Elizabeth Henderson
- Occupation: Caterer
- Family: Logan family
- Husband: Stephen Logan (1960's–2006)
- Sons: Storm Logan
- Daughters: Brooke Logan; Donna Logan; Katie Logan
- Grandsons: Rick Forrester; R.J. Forrester; Jack Marone; Marcus Forrester; Will Spencer
- Granddaughters: Bridget Forrester; Hope Logan; Flo Logan

Beth Logan is the matriarch of the Logan family, and was a series regular when it began. She was originally portrayed by Judith Baldwin from March 25 to June 1, 1987. After Baldwin left the role, Nancy Burnett began playing Beth from June 2, 1987, to September 14, 1988. Burnett briefly returned from December 22, 1989 to January 3, 1990 and again from March 2 to April 17, 1990. Marla Adams, known for her role as Dina Mergeron on The Young and the Restless, was announced for the role of Beth on November 24, 1990, playing her from December 5, 1990 until January 4, 1991. Burnett returned to the role on August 16, 1994, and from September 19 to October 4. Burnett would also make various guest appearances from January 11 to April 16, 1996, January 2 to 7, 1997, March 24 and 25, 1997, May 27 to June 3, 1997, December 31, 1997 to January 13, 1998 until stints in 2001 from January 12 to 17, September 20 and 27 to October 9, 2001. Upon the character's 2008 return, Robin Riker played Beth, who arrived with a "new personality." Riker's portrayal was met with acclaim; Tommy Garrett of Canyon News named her Leading Lady of the Week ending August 29, 2009, along with Susan Flannery (Stephanie Forrester), for their "epic battle." Garrett said Riker "showed viewers that she is capable of high drama."

As a teen, Beth fell in love with Eric Forrester (John McCook). However, another woman, Stephanie Douglas, manipulated Eric into marrying her instead. Beth then married Stephen Logan and they had four children together, including Brooke Logan (Katherine Kelly Lang). Briefly, it was speculated that Brooke was the product of Eric and Beth's love affair decades earlier; however, it was confirmed that she wasn't. During her marriage to Stephen, he abandoned her and his children, leaving Beth the Logans' sole provider. In 1991, Brooke married Eric, which upset Beth, who had remained in love with Eric throughout her marriage and break-up from Stephen.

Beth returned to Los Angeles in 2008 at the request of Nick Marone (Jack Wagner), because he thought her youngest daughter, Katie, who had recently received a heart transplant, needed her. Her family became worried about Beth's strange behavior. She eventually revealed to Katie that she had had several mini-strokes and was also in the early stages of dementia. After some convincing from her family, Beth finally agreed to stay in Los Angeles and receive treatment from her granddaughter Dr. Bridget Forrester (Ashley Jones) and Dr. Taylor Hayes (Hunter Tylo). The treatment appeared to be working, and Stephen and Beth also hinted at a possible reconciliation. After a long absence, the two reappeared for Nick and Bridget's wedding, and it was mentioned that they had been in Paris. Beth died in the Forrester pool after a fight between her and Stephanie in 2010, devastating the Logans.

== Helen Logan ==
Helen Logan
- The Bold and the Beautiful character
- Portrayed by: Lesley Woods
- Duration: 1987–1989; 2001
- First appearance: April 14, 1987
- Last appearance: January 17, 2001
- Created by: William J. Bell
- Introduced by: William J. Bell and Lee Phillip Bell
In-universe information
- Family: Logan family
- Sons: Stephen Logan
- Grandsons: Storm Logan
- Granddaughters: Brooke Logan Forrester; Donna Logan; Katie Logan

Helen Logan was the matriarch of the Logan family, affectionately known as "Grandma Logan." She was portrayed by Lesley Woods from April 14, 1987 to December 27, 1989, with an appearance from January 12 to 17, 2001.

== Margo Maclaine Lynley ==
Margo Maclaine Lynley was portrayed by Lauren Koslow from March 23, 1987 to April 22, 1992, with a reappearance from October 31 to November 1, 2002, for newly created flashbacks.

== Dave Reed ==
Dave Reed was portrayed by Stephen Shortridge in 1987.

== Mark Mallory ==
Mark Mallory was portrayed by Michael Philip from April 30, 1987 (episode 29) to December 15, 1987 (episode 177).

Mark is introduced as the boyfriend of Donna Logan.

== Ron Deacon ==
Ron Deacon was portrayed by Greg Wrangler from August 4, 1987 (episode 87) to November 13, 1987 (episode 158).

Ron is introduced as a customer of a restaurant named Cantina de Oro who takes an interest in Caroline Spencer.

Caroline Spencer and Brooke Logan are dining at Cantina de Oro one day for lunch when Ron is first seen as the bar. He notices and takes an interest in Caroline. He thinks about how beautiful she is.

Ron returns to the restaurant the same night and sees Caroline again. Ron orders a drink from the bartender, watches her, and thinks that she looks lonely. He contemplates how to first meet her. Ron walks by her table and spills his drink on her dress. He pretends it was an accident and grabs napkins to try and clean the mess. He offers to pay her cleaning bill, and she politely declines. She tells him to forget about the accident, and he thanks her for his graciousness. He enters the phone booth at the restaurant and pretends to make a phone call. He thinks that Caroline is more beautiful than a woman he knows named Roxanne. Ron ponders on a way to befriend Caroline. He walks over and offers to buy her another iced tea, and she accepts. He walks to the bar and thinks about how he has to be careful to get Caroline to like him. Ron returns with her drink, and she accepts his offer to sit with her. He asks if she's really mad at him for spilling his drink with her since she seems distant, and she tells him she has a lot on her mind. Ron continues to make small talk with her, and she admits she's having a hard time getting over a man. He tells her he works at a bank. They share their first names with each other, and he compliments her beauty. Ron tells Caroline he moved to Los Angeles from New York a couple of years prior with his ailing mother. He then tells her he dropped his drink on her en route to the phone booth to call his mother and let her know he would be late. When she compliments him on being a nice guy, he thinks to himself that it "works every time". Caroline decides to leave, and he decides to leave at the same time. She initially declines but then accepts his offer to walk her home since it's getting dark. He asks to pay her dinner bill if she won't allow him to pay her cleaning bill, and she eventually accepts.

Ron and Caroline leave the restaurant, and after walking some distance, he buys her an ice cream at a booth. He tells her that she reminds him of a woman he used to date named Roxanne. When Caroline asks what happened, he tells her it's a long story. They depart the ice cream booth and arrive at her apartment complex. Ron tells her that he does not trust hallways and says that his mother trained him to always escort a girl to her door. Caroline initially declines, but he talks her into it. They arrive at her door and exchange goodbyes. Ron walks away, and she unlocks and enters her apartment. Caroline attempts to close the door and notices his foot placed in the doorway. Ron claims he forgot to get her phone number, walks in, and closes the door behind him. When she backs away, he tells her not to be afraid. Caroline lies and says that she has friends coming over, but he reminds her that she said she was going to bed at the restaurant. Ron tells her she's going to ruin his visit if she's afraid. When Caroline asks about his mother, who he earlier said had dinner waiting on him, he tells Caroline his mother died over 6 years prior. Caroline begs Ron to leave, but he taunts her and tells her he has a knife that he hopes he doesn't have to use. Ron then rapes her and leaves.

== Clarke Garrison ==
Clarke Garrison
- The Bold and the Beautiful character
- Portrayed by: Daniel McVicar
- Duration: 1987–92; 1996–2009
- First appearance: Episode 138; September 30, 1987
- Last appearance: Episode 5633; August 20, 2009
In-universe information
- Occupation: Fashion Designer; Head Designer at Jackie M Designs
- Spouse: Kristen Forrester Dominguez (1988–90); Sally Spectra (1992–93)
- Children: C. J. Garrison; Mark Maclaine

Clarke Garrison was portrayed from 1987 to 1992 and from 1996 to 2009 by Daniel McVicar.

McVicar describes Clarke as "the classic heel with a heart, a cad with a conscience". He is a former fashion designer for the now-defunct Spectra Fashions. Originally a student at Otis Parsons Institute the eternally ambitious character has always wrestled with the balance between ambition and questions of the heart. He has two sons, C.J. (Mick Cain) from his marriage to Sally Spectra (played by Darlene Conley), and Mark (Michael Dietz) from his affair with Margo Lynley (Lauren Koslow). He was also once married to Kristen Forrester (then played by Teri Ann Linn). Their relationship began when Kristen's mother, Stephanie (Susan Flannery), hired Clarke to seduce Kristen, fearing that her daughter was frigid. Clarke began to have feelings for Kristen and they married, before splitting later.

Clarke left town in September 1992, returning four years later to see his son, C.J. (then played by Kyle Sabihy). C.J. wanted nothing to do with his father, angry at Clarke for walking out on him and Sally. This changed when Clarke rescued him from kidnappers.

Clarke and Sally remained close friends; she affectionately called him "Bucky". He also shared a bond with Sally's former receptionist, Darla (Schae Harrison), who Sally thought of as a daughter.

After a disastrous flirtation with Morgan DeWitt (Sarah Buxton), which almost ended with Clarke being killed by a python, "Patsy", Clarke began to woo a recently returned Kristen (now Tracy Melchior). His attempts at seducing his ex-wife were unsuccessful, as Kristen moved on with Tony Dominguez (Paulo Benedeti).

Clarke's most notable lapse in judgement was in early 2005, when he reluctantly helped a vengeful Amber Moore (Adrienne Frantz) trap Ridge Forrester (Ronn Moss) and his stepdaughter Bridget Forrester (Ashley Jones) down a mineshaft in the hope that they would give into their "feelings" for one another, destroying Ridge's marriage to Bridget's mother, Brooke Logan (Katherine Kelly Lang). Amber received the ammunition she needed, and she and Clarke escaped prosecution due to Sally's pleas for Stephanie not to press charges. It seems, however, that the Forresters have forgiven Clarke for this crime, as he is often present at their family gatherings.

Until recently Clarke worked at Forrester Creations, as the new head designer, after being hired by the new owners at that time, Nick (Jack Wagner) and Jackie Marone (Lesley-Anne Down). He was demoted to designer after Brooke returned to Forrester Creations and was made head designer. After Eric Forrester (John McCook) bought back Forrester Creations, he was under no obligation to honor Clarke's contract and Clarke was released from the company.

Not too long after Jackie Marone and Dominick Marone sold Forrester Creations back to the Forresters, Clarke found himself once again back at Spectra Fashions. Because the new owners of Spectra Fashions had gone bankrupt, the company was reverted to Sally Spectra. As she no longer wanted to run the business, Sally Spectra asked Clarke and their son C.J. to sell the business for her. Knowing Jackie and her son would be interested, Clarke made his way to their home. One thing led to the next and Nick purchased the company making Clarke their head designer. The company was later renamed "M Fashions". Clarke worked at Jackie M Designs, the company formerly known as Spectra Fashions.

== Nicholas "Nick" Preston ==
Nick Preston was portrayed by Clyde Allan Hayes (credited as Allan Hayes) from April 7, 1988 (episode 255) to March 2, 1989 (episode 482).

Nick is introduced as a young magazine publisher that Donna Logan visits to interview for a modeling job.

== Deveney Dixon ==
Deveney Dixon was portrayed by Judith Borne from 1988 to 1989. She was an imposter who claimed to be the deceased Angela Forrester, daughter of Eric Forrester and Stephanie Forrester.

== Brian Burke ==
Lieutenant Brian Burke was portrayed by Jeff Allin from September 28, 1988 (episode 377) to July 28, 1995 (episode 2091).

Burke is introduced as a lieutenant with the Beverly Hills Police Department investigating the attempted murder of Ridge Forrester.

Lt Burke arrives at the hospital after the attempted murder of Ridge Forrester at the Forrester mansion to ask Eric Forrester and Stephanie Forrester questions about the crime. Lt Burke asks Eric what happened from his point of view, and Eric explains that he was in the shower and exited to hear Stephanie calling out for him from outside. He saw her kneeling over Ridge's body as she screamed out for him to call the paramedics. He called them and then joined her. Eric explains that Stephanie saw more than he did. When Lt Burke directs his questions to Stephanie, she attempts to evade them, knowing that she witnessed Thorne Forrester shoot Ridge. She gives him a few details, and when she is asked about what she actually saw happen, she becomes irate and tells him her son could be dying in an attempt to get Lt Burke to back off. She apologizes and tells him she knows he is only doing his job. He requests to visit her at her home the next morning and says he will need her full statement by then.

== Mark Maclaine ==
Mark Maclaine, whose birth name was Mark Lynley, was portrayed by Zachariah Koslow-Schillace from December 14, 1988 (episode 430) to 1992 as a child. Michael Dietz portrayed the character from October 2, 2002 (episode 3894) to July 27, 2005 (episode 4605).

Mark is introduced as the son of Clarke Garrison and Margo Lynley.

== Saul Feinberg ==
Saul Feinberg was the long-time assistant to Sally Spectra at Spectra Creations. He was portrayed by Michael Fox from January 19, 1989 to June 18, 1996.

== Mick Savage ==
Mick Savage was portrayed by Jeff Conaway from May 19, 1989 (episode 538) to February 26, 1990 (episode 732).

Mick is introduced as an ex-boyfriend of Kristen Forrester.
