= Sky High (1986 film) =

- Directed by: Nico Mastorakis
- Written by: Robert Gilliam; Nico Mastorakis; Fred Perry; Gary Van Haas
- Produced by: Nico Mastorakis
- Starring: Daniel Hirsch; Clayton Norcross; Frank Schultz; Yvette Jarvis; John Lawrence; Danos Lygizos; Jeff McGrail; Kimon Mouzenidis; Spyros Papafrantzis; Julie Simone; Nikos Skiadas
- Cinematography: Andreas Bellis
- Edited by: George Rosenberg
- Music by: Dennis Haines
- Release date: October 29, 1986
- Running time: 82 min.
- Country: United States
- Language: English

Sky High is a 1986 American adventure and comedy film directed and produced by Nico Mastorakis, and starring Daniel Hirsch, Clayton Norcross, Frank Schultz, Yvette Jarvis and John Lawrence. The film has music composed by Dennis Haines.

== Plot summary ==
Three American college students, Les, Bobby and Mick, vacation in Athens hoping to see the sights and meet local women. They witness an assassination, uncover a possible KGB conspiracy and come into possession of an audio cassette that can induce hallucinations. Government agents and criminals pursue them for the tape, and at one point the three disguise themselves in drag.

== Cast ==
- Daniel Hirsch as Les
- Clayton Norcross as Bobby
- Frank Schultz as Mick
- Yvette Jarvis as Black prostitute
- John Lawrence as Boswell
- Danos Lygizos as Yuri
- Jeff McGrail as FBI Agent
- Kimon Mouzenidis as Cab Driver
- Spyros Papafrantzis as Hotel Clerk
- Julie Simone as Barbie
- Nikos Skiadas as Moscow Agent
- Lauren Taylor as Sally
- Janet Taylor as Joanna
- Karen Verlaine as Stefani

== Production ==
Mastorakis shot the film in Greece, including a sequence filmed at the Acropolis. In an interview recorded for the film's Blu-ray release, he said he financed Sky High himself.

== Release ==
Vestron's Lightning Video label released Sky High on VHS. Arrow Video later issued it on Blu-ray in The Nico Mastorakis Collection, on the same disc as Mastorakis's The Time Traveler (1984).

== Reception ==
Reviewing the Arrow collection in 2024, Robyn Adams of The Geek Show called Sky High "a goofy travelogue sex comedy" that is "far too long" at almost two hours, while praising its location work and a motorbike chase. Mondo Digital described it as Mastorakis's first outright comedy, with a plot resembling the teen espionage sex comedies of the period such as Gotcha!.
