= Sally Spectra =

American soap opera character from The Bold and the Beautiful

- The Bold and the Beautiful character
- Portrayed by: Darlene Conley (1989–2006); Uncredited actress (2012); Ruth Williamson (2017)
- Duration: 1989–2006; 2012; 2017
- First appearance: Episode 452; January 17, 1989
- Last appearance: Episode 7515; February 1, 2017
- Created by: William J. Bell
In-universe information
- Other names: Sally Alexander; Sally Garrison
- Occupation: Retiree; Executive assistant at Forrester Creations; Co-owner of Spectra Couture; Acting Head of Logan Designs; Owner of Spectra Fashions
- Sisters: Shirley Spectra
- Husband: Adam Alexander (backstory); Clarke Garrison (1992–93)
- Sons: C. J. Garrison
- Daughters: Macy Alexander
- Adoptive daughters: Darla Forrester
- Granddaughters: Alexandria Forrester

Sally Spectra is a fictional character from the American soap opera The Bold and the Beautiful, played by actress Darlene Conley from January 17, 1989, to November 29, 2006.

Introduced in the show's early years, Sally was the founder and operator of Spectra Creations, competing with (and copying from) the show's core family, the Forresters. She was known for her large figure, open and jovial personality, and her trademark red coiffure. Like many dramatic, fashionable and larger-than-life female figures, she was appreciated by fans as a gay icon. She was also celebrated as a fuller-figured woman; Conley described Sally as "unabashedly sexy and completely comfortable not being a size 8. She knows men get a kick out of her."

== Development ==
The character was intended to be a short-term character, but the show brought her on full-time after an "overwhelmingly positive response" from viewers. In 1991, Conley said, "Other soaps have tried the older, outrageous woman, but have only picked up the eccentricities... [Sally's] a successful businesswoman. She does function on several levels, and she laughs at herself. Believe me, no one laughs at Sally Spectra first."

Looking back on her character, Conley wrote in 2006, "When William J. Bell came up with the idea of the character of Sally Spectra, I knew that she was perfect. Sally was funny and she knew it and she used it. She used humor to get to people, had tons of opinions of her own and she wasn't afraid to open her mouth and say 'em. And that was right up my street and I never looked back, not once... What a lucky broad I am to have Sally." Conley was nominated for two Daytime Emmy Awards for her work playing Sally. Her first, in 1991, being the first time an actor from The Bold and the Beautiful was nominated for an Emmy.

== Storylines ==
Within the show, Spectra owned and operated Spectra Fashions, a knock-off of the more established Forrester firm. Clarke Garrison (Daniel McVicar), had worked for Sally. Sally blackmailed him to design for Spectra while working for Forrester, but later he worked for Spectra. Sally struck a deal with Clarke to marry her and receive part ownership in her company, and they married. He first claimed to be impotent but eventually fathered C.J. (Mick Cain), Sally's son. Spectra later discovered that Clarke was having an affair with Kristen Forrester (then played by Terri Ann Linn). With the help of her Spectra family Sally managed to prove Clarke's infidelity to court and thus avoided losing her company. Sally divorced Clarke and he left town. Her company eventually went under. She shut down, and then sold off, what was left of her company. She then began working at Forrester Creations as the new receptionist. Sally last appeared on-screen in November 2006, shortly before Conley's death on January 14, 2007. For a long time after Darlene Conley's death, nothing was explained about Sally's absence, except mention by her son, C.J. that she had been ill. Sally has been married twice, first to Adam Alexander (Michael Swan) by whom she had a daughter, Macy and later to Clarke Garrison with whom she has a son named C.J. (Clarke Jr.) (Mick Cain).

Her relationship with Stephanie Forrester (Susan Flannery) was unique. For years, they often fought and fussed, due to her firm's knock-off reputation. These spats often ended with Sally taking an unceremonious dip in the water, usually instigated by Stephanie. (At that time, her catch phrase was a usually loud "Hello, Stephanie!") One time, Stephanie and Sally were drunk in Stephanie's office at Forrester, and Stephanie allowed Sally to cut her hair.

Time helped cement the two women's friendship. Sally called Stephanie "Highness" or "Queenie"; at first the nicknames were meant to be sarcastic, but later became terms of affection. Stephanie in turn called Sally "doll" and referred to her as "Sal, my gal". Sally was considered to be part of the extended Forrester family, often joining Stephanie at family function, which was by virtue of Sally's daughter Macy, and later, her other daughter, Darla, being married to Thorne Forrester.

When Darlene Conley died in 2007, the Bold and the Beautiful gave Sally a happy ending, explaining that she was living off-screen in the South of France, "surrounded by hunky cabana boys." Producer Bradley Bell explained, "Darlene was a bigger-than-life character, so she had to live forever."

In January 2017, a new incarnation of Sally Spectra was introduced, played by actress Courtney Hope until her departure from the soap in 2020. Sally Spectra II is Sally's grand-niece who attempts to revive Spectra Creations and deliberately invokes her grandmother's legendary persona, with flaming red hair and an outsized personality.

== Reception ==
For her portrayal of Sally, Conley received a nomination for Outstanding Supporting Actress: Daytime at the 1990 Soap Opera Digest Awards.

Sally was appreciated as a particularly bold figure in American soap operas. As one writer put it following Conley's death, "The thrill was that Sally Spectra got to be in the game, got to be a fully sexualized, fully realized human being with a vulnerable heart, who faced tragedy, like losing [ex-husband] Clarke, or the death of her beloved [daughter] Macy. But like Scarlett O'Hara with a regular salon appointment, she pulled herself from adversity, dusted herself off, adjusted her shoulder pads and got back in the game."

In 1998, the character was commemorated with a statue in Madame Tussauds famous wax museums in London, Amsterdam and Melbourne, "duplicating Spectra's mane of red hair and Rubenesque figure." This was the first soap opera character to appear at Madame Tussauds. "It's an incredible honor," Conley told The Los Angeles Times. "When they first approached me, I was dumbfounded. I almost fainted. It took me about three seconds to say yes."

Following Conley's death, her Bold and the Beautiful wardrobe was auctioned to benefit the Center for the Protection of Child Abuse. The auction began with a runway show of Sally's outfits.

In 2022, Charlie Mason from Soaps She Knows placed Sally second on his ranked list of The Bold and the Beautiful's Best of the Best Characters Ever, commenting, "The late, great Darlene Conley's larger-than-life character may have trafficked in knockoff fashions, but her portrayer was 100-percent original — a camp classic whose spirit has proven to be impossible to recycle!" Mason also placed Sally 26th on his ranked list of Soaps' 40 Most Iconic Characters of All Time, writing, "We'll always be grateful to the soap for deciding after the passing of the inimitable Darlene Conley to allow her flamboyant character to keep living her best life, even if it had to be off screen".
