= Landry Allbright =

American actress

- Born: San Dimas, California, U.S.
- Occupation: Actress
- Years active: 1996–present
- Spouse: Elizabeth Zwiebel (2019–2024)

Landry Allbright is an American actress known for working as a child in hit films and television shows. Allbright is best known for playing Bridget Forrester on The Bold and the Beautiful (1996–1997).

== Personal life ==
Allbright married Elizabeth Zwiebel in March 2019. They separated in August 2024, and Zwiebel filed for divorce the following March.

Allbright spoke about her life as a lesbian and being a public figure in the entertainment industry in a 2018 Facebook video.

== Filmography ==
=== Film ===
Year	Title	Role	Notes
1997	Con Air	Casey Poe	
2000	Beautiful	Summer	
2000	How the Grinch Stole Christmas	8-year-old Martha	
2011	A Foolish Companion	Jesse	Short
2012	Last Hours in Suburbia	Sorority Girl	
2012	Palindrome	Nadia	Short
2013	Sonata in Blue	Riley	Short
2016	Where We Left Off	Sarah	Short
2017	Feral	Gina	
2019	Kill the Boyfriend	Lain	Short
2020	Getaway Girls	Brooke	
2020	Blinders	Erin	
2021	Miracle Valley	Bar Patron #2	

=== Television ===
Year	Title	Role	Notes
1996–1997	The Bold and the Beautiful	Bridget Forrester	Recurring role: January 12, 1996, to December 19, 1997
2000	Malcolm in the Middle	Julie Houlerman	Recurring role
2000	The Invisible Man	Jessica Semplar	Episode: "Ralph"
2000	Spin City	Susie	Episode: "Blind Faith"
2001	Judging Amy	Abrianna Franklin	Episode: "Darkness for Light"
2001	Seventh Heaven	Christy Parks	Episode: "Relationships"
2002	Will & Grace	Nancy	
2002	The Zeta Project	Kale	Voice, episode: "Lost and Found"
2003	Without a Trace	Annie Miller	Episode: "Maple Street"
2003	Six Feet Under	Mary Jane	Episode: "Tears, Bones & Desire"
2004	The Guardian	Megan Tilden	Episode: "All Is Mended"
2005	The West Wing	Elisha	Episode: "A Good Day"
2010	Happy Thoughts	Trista	Season 1 Episode 5
2018	Love Daily	Florida Montana	Episode: "Paul's Broken Heart"
2018	S.W.A.T.	Joy	Episode: "Patrol"
2018	Adam Ruins Everything	Sarah Donnerman	Episode: "Adam Ruins Guns"
2019	Alexa & Katie	Nurse Michele	Episode: "Always Something There to Remind Me"
2020	Star Trek: Picard	Chop Doc	Episode: "Stardust City Rag"
