= Clayton Norcross =

American film and television actor

- Norcross in 1987
- Born: Clayton Wesley Norcross; September 8, 1954 (age 72); California, U.S.
- Education: San Diego State University
- Occupation: Actor

Clayton Wesley Norcross (born September 8, 1954) is an American actor. He is best known for playing Thorne Forrester in the American soap opera The Bold and the Beautiful.

== Life and career ==
Norcross was born at Edwards Air Force Base in California, on September 8, 1954, and was raised in Arcadia, California. He attended Pasadena City College. He also attended San Diego State University, earning his BA degree in cinema. He began his screen career in 1986, starring as Bobby in the film Sky High, starring along with Daniel Hirsch. In the same year, he guest-starred in the television programs Santa Barbara, You Again? and The Colbys.

From 1987 to 1989, Norcross played Thorne Forrester in the CBS soap opera television series The Bold and the Beautiful. According to The Daily Oklahoman, he described his character as "a lot like himself" in 1988. He guest-starred in television programs including JAG, Hawaii Five-O, Northern Exposure and Agent Carter. He also appeared in films such as Fatal Passion, Cheer Passion and Defending Your Life. Aside from acting, he worked as a model.
