= Bridget Forrester =

- The Bold and the Beautiful character
- Ashley Jones as Bridget Forrester
- Portrayed by: Landry Allbright (1996–1997); Agnes Bruckner (1997–1999); Jennifer Finnigan (2000–2004); Emily Harrison (2004); Ashley Jones (2004–present); (and others)
- Duration: 1992–2013; 2015–2016; 2018; 2020–present
- First appearance: December 30, 1992
- Created by: William J. Bell
- Introduced by: William J. Bell and Lee Phillip Bell
- Crossover appearances: The Price Is Right
In-universe information
- Other names: Bridget Marone; Bridget Sharpe; Madame X
- Occupation: Doctor; Fashion designer
- Family: Forrester; Logan
- Parents: Eric Forrester; Brooke Logan
- Brothers: Rick Forrester
- Half-brothers: Ridge Forrester (legal); Thorne Forrester; Marcus Forrester (adoptive); R.J. Forrester; Jack Marone
- Half-sisters: Angela Forrester; Felicia Forrester; Kristen Forrester; Hope Logan
- Spouse: Deacon Sharpe (2001–2002); Nick Marone (2005–2006, 2008, 2009–2010)
- Children: Nicole Marone; Logan Forrester Knight
- Grandparents: Stephen Logan; Beth Logan
- Aunts and uncles: John Forrester; Storm Logan; Donna Logan; Katie Logan
- Nieces and nephews: Steffy Forrester; Phoebe Forrester; Thomas Forrester; Zende Forrester Dominguez (adoptive); Aly Forrester; Dino Damiano; Rosie Forrester; Lizzy Forrester; Beth Spencer
- First cousins: Jessica Forrester; Flo Fulton; Ivy Forrester; Marcus Forrester; Will Spencer

Bridget Forrester is a fictional character from The Bold and the Beautiful, an American soap opera on the CBS network. She first appeared in 1992 as the infant daughter of Brooke Logan and Eric Forrester. The character was portrayed by actress Ashley Jones from December 2004 to January 2011 as a regular, but was dropped to recurring status and continued to make appearances up until February 29, 2012, when Bridget left for New York along with a few others. Since 2013, Jones has continued to make guest appearances on the soap.

== Casting ==
The Faces of Bridget Forrester
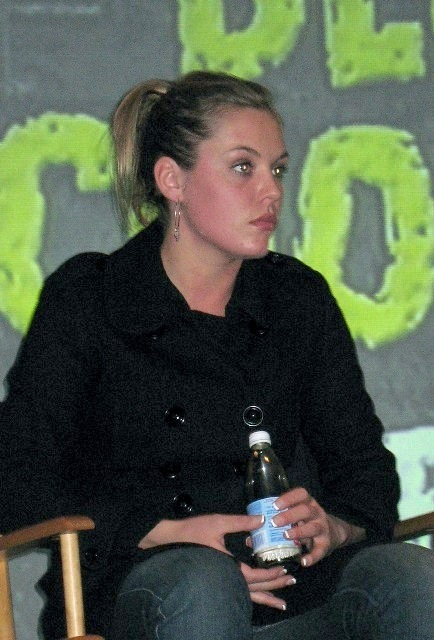
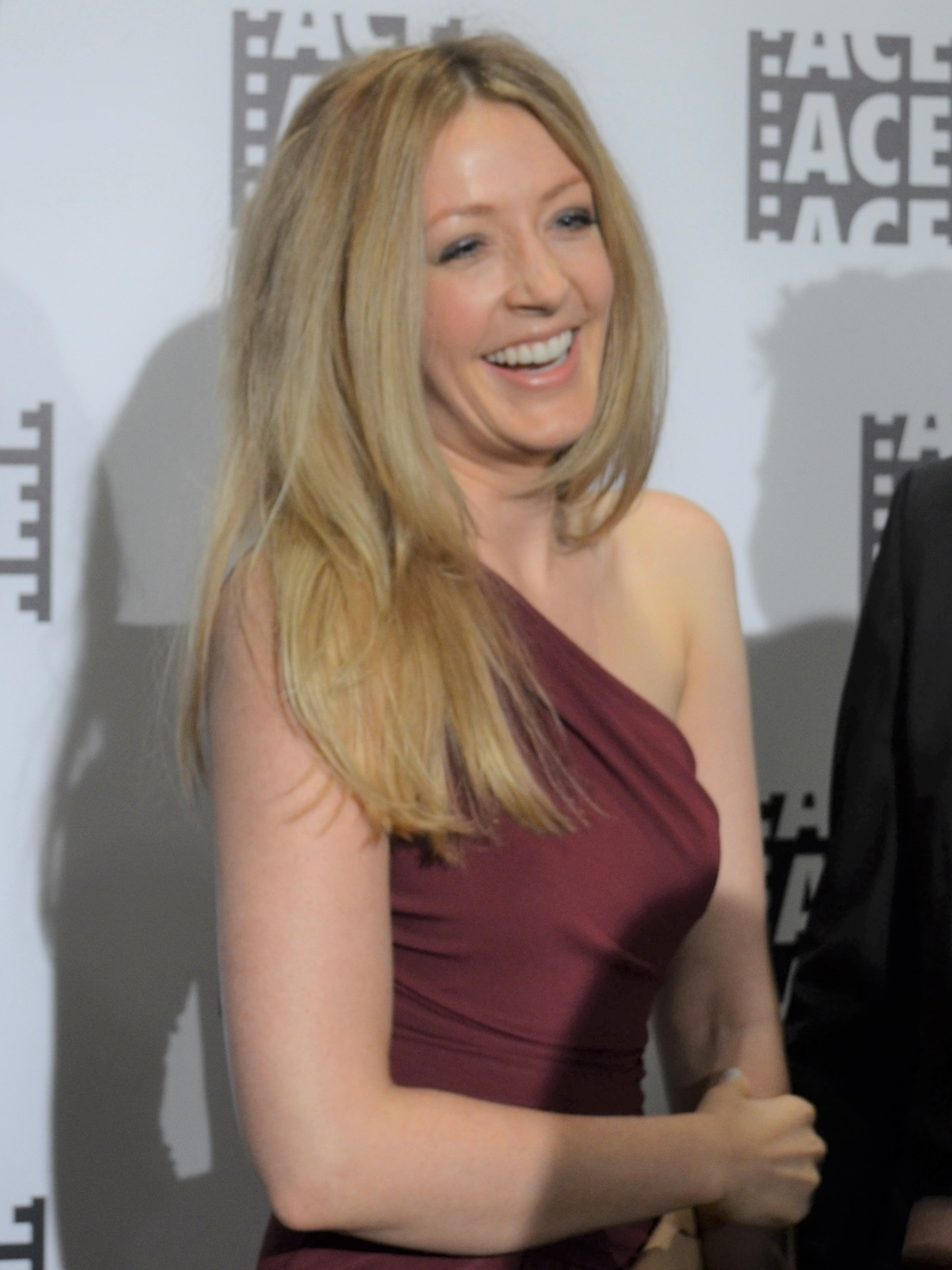
Agnes Bruckner (left) was cast as Bridget in 1997. She remained in the role until 1999; Jennifer Finnigan (right) replaced Bruckner the following year and exited in 2004.

The role was originated by various child actresses including Landry Allbright. Agnes Bruckner portrayed Bridget as a rebellious teenager from early 1997 to January 4, 1999. This was Bruckner's first job as an actress, which she described as an "incredible experience" which taught her about the industry. In 2013, she said: "I was only 11 years old, and being on a soap opera, especially at such a young age for me, was basically a very important acting class, just because there were so many elements of working with different directors, memorizing your lines, working with different actors, really learning how to act on a set." Jennifer Finnigan portrayed the role from 2000 to 2004 when she was replaced by Emily Harrison who left the show after only a couple of months. Finnegan's departure as Bridget had been reported in October 2003. Actress Kirsten Storms previously auditioned for the role in 1999.

In December 2004, two time Daytime Emmy nominee Ashley Jones (Megan Dennison, The Young and the Restless) took over the role of Bridget Forrester. In 2008, she spoke of her first day on set, revealing "I was so intimidated because I was working with Katherine Kelly Lang, and I had all these crying scenes", and also remembering that she felt on edge having replaced Finnigan. By June 2009, Jones had appeared in over 600 episodes of the series. Initially, she had only planned to remain in the role for only two years, but said: "I didn't see any reason to leave, and I didn't want anyone else to play Bridget."

Jones opted to be let out of her contract in December 2010 to focus on other projects. She returned in a non-contract capacity in October 2011. Having appeared last in early 2012, Jones returned to tape a four-episode appearance in May 2013. The actress noted that she "didn't want to go back for a wedding of funeral" because "this is too cool a character to come back and just sit in the background. That's not fun." Discussing a possible future return, she said: "This is a fun character the audience really responds to, so I'm open to whatever they might have in mind for her." In July 2015, it was confirmed that Jones would return to The Bold and the Beautiful for a short arc from August 7 to 12. In February 2016, it was announced that Jones who is also appearing on General Hospital would briefly return as Bridget from February 16 to 19.

In August 2018, it was announced that Jones would reprise the role. The actress returned on August 20, 21, 22, September 25 and December 25, 2018. In March 2020, she reprised the role for a three-day guest stint from March 26 to 30 of the same year. She reprised the role later that year on November 2. Jones returned again from March 31 to June 29, 2022.

On November 3, 2023, it was announced Jones would reprise the role from December 6 to 22. She returned again on September 27 and December 24, 2024, and in 2025 she has appeared on numerous episodes with Bridget using her medical skills to save lives and solve mysteries.

In 2024, she was nominated for a Daytime Emmy for her role as Bridget, which was her second nomination for the role, the fourth in her career.

== Development ==
=== Characterization ===
"Her sense of self-worth comes from putting everyone else before herself. I think that's a beautiful thing, but there comes a point where if you don't have a backbone, it's like that old saying: "If you don't stand for something, you'll fall for anything." If you can't help yourself stand up tall, it does you a disservice and you're really no longer much use to other people."

— Ashley Jones on Bridget's "tragic flaw"

Jones stated that Bridget values her family which is "ironically, the most inconsistent yet the most consistent thing in her life", calling her the only family member who has her "priorities straight". She also described Bridget as being the "voice of reason" and "moral compass" of the Forrester family, even acting as a "nurturer" to her parents. Furthermore, she opined that Bridget's deep "personal turmoil" acts as life experience, allowing her to offer advice to others. Bridget became a doctor, as she "lives to help other people", with Jones stating that this was the "most natural thing in the world" for her to do. She also felt that another part of Bridget's choice to become a doctor was because she's "been through a lot of emotional challenges", all of which she has come out a stronger person. However, Bridget later became a fashion designer for Jackie M Designs, designing ladies high fashion while embracing more of a "sensuality and strength". Jones saw this as Bridget "coming into her own" and becoming "in tune" with her sexuality, saying "She’s a renaissance woman".

=== Relationships ===
Daytime Confidential regards Bridget as her mother Brooke Logan's (Katherine Kelly Lang) "most tragic victim", with Brooke having been impregnated by Deacon Sharpe (Sean Kanan) while he was married to Bridget. Jones described Bridget and Brooke's relationship as the character's defining moment, stating that it is "infinitely interesting and complex". She observed: "From Bridget's perspective, she's had two husbands taken away from her, and even losing her daughter in a lot of ways had to do with her mom. So it's a beautiful thing and a heinous thing all tied into one."

Bridget had a major relationship with Nick Marone (Jack Wagner), whom she married three times. Jones described Nick as "the perfect man" who "posses a lot of the qualities that are ideal" for Bridget until he is unfaithful with her aunt Katie Logan (Heather Tom). Jones noted that Nick and Bridget went through a "real roller coaster" with him being involved with Brooke and Katie, but she believed that they were meant to be together, calling it a "beautiful love story (...) just in a very roundabout, weird way. These characters can't stay away from each other." After Nick's affair with Katie (and brief engagement to her), she writes him a Dear John letter, prompting him to cross paths with Bridget again. She returns to Nick despite his actions; Jones said "there is no great answer as to why she goes back to Nick for the millionth time other than that she really loves him", describing him as her "great love" and Achilles' heel.

In 2010, Bridget was involved in a "Who's the daddy?" storyline which saw her become pregnant with her husband Nick's stepfather Owen Knight's (Brandon Beemer) child. Jones said that "skye's the limit as far as story potential with Bridget and those guys". On-Air On-Soaps declared that Bridget's halo was "coming down" after cheating on Nick with Owen. Jones said she was shocked, but "I am glad they are giving Bridget an edge, and she was knocked off of her pedestal. She is more human and relatable with a sense of humility she did not have before because it’s eye opening and humbling when you are severely mistaken about something and you do something heinous like that, always."

== Storylines ==
Bridget is the second child born to fashion tycoon Eric Forrester and Brooke Logan. She has an older brother, Rick. She has four paternal half-siblings, being Thorne, Felicia, Kristen and a fourth half-sister who died of microcephaly, Angela. The day Ridge Forrester was set to marry Taylor Hamilton, Brooke discovered her pregnancy. She had slept with both Ridge and Eric, meaning there were two possibilities for fathers. After failing to get Ridge to leave Taylor for her, Brooke went into labor and gave birth with the help of Ridge and Taylor at Big Bear Cabin. Soon after the baby was born, they had a paternity test (which was tampered with by Sheila Carter) that at the time confirmed Ridge as the father. Brooke named the baby Bridget, a combination of her and Ridge's names. Like Rick, her older brother, Bridget had a tough childhood. As a baby, she was shot by drive-by shooters while at the park with her babysitter. In 1996, a mysterious letter put into question Bridget's paternity. It was not until this time that Eric was revealed to be Bridget's biological father. Bridget was then forced to understand how Eric, and not Ridge, was her father.

By 1997, Bridget and Rick had become Teenagers. Bridget disapproved of Grant and Brooke's marriage and refused to accept him as her step-father. In 1998, Bridget ran away from home after Ridge told her that he was leaving Brooke and going back to Taylor. In Spring 1999, Bridget began a brief relationship with the slightly older C.J. Garrison, who had fallen in love with Rebecca "Becky" Moore, the cousin of Amber Moore. C.J. would leave Bridget for Becky, leaving her devastated. Bridget also formed a friendship with Lauren Fenmore in the Summer of 1999 while learning about the Fashion Industry. In the fall of 1999, Bridget briefly schemed with Kimberly Fairchild to break up Rick and Amber's marriage. Bridget eventually fell into the background, and was completely dropped off the show's canvas by October 1999.

Bridget returns to Los Angeles in July 2000, now appearing as a young adult. Later that year, she is seduced by Deacon Sharpe (Sean Kanan). In early 2001, Bridget and Deacon elope, getting married in Las Vegas, but shortly after begin drifting apart. After Brooke is rejected by Ridge and dumped by Thorne, she sinks into a depression. Deacon comforts Brooke and they end up having an affair behind Bridget's back, resulting in the birth of Hope Logan (Kim Matula), who Bridget helped deliver. Brooke marries Whip Jones (Rick Hearst) to try and cover up her adultery, but Bridget eventually learns the truth about Deacon and Brooke's affair and is livid. In spring 2002, Bridget dates C.J. Garrison, while also meeting her medical school mentor Dr. Mark MacClaine (Michael Dietz). C.J. becomes jealous of Mark, sensing that Mark has feelings for Bridget. Soon, Mark resigns as Bridget's mentor and begins a relationship with her. C.J. discovers that Mark is his long lost half-brother, leaving Bridget stuck in the middle, with both relationships ending. Bridget later has a romance with Oscar Marone (Brian Gaskill), who eventually becomes her fiancé. They left Los Angeles for Copenhagen so that Bridget could finish her medical studies, but she returns alone a few months later, disclosing that she and Oscar had ended their engagement.

Upon her return, Bridget develops feelings for Nick Marone (Jack Wagner) who had previously shared a passionate relationship with her mother, Brooke. They soon begin dating, with Brooke's support, and become engaged. Their wedding is cut short when Ridge's late wife Dr. Taylor Hayes Forrester (Hunter Tylo), who was thought to be dead, returns. Her return renders Ridge and Brooke's marriage invalid, prompting Nick to re-evaluate his feelings for Brooke. Another marriage attempt in Las Vegas goes awry, and a third wedding is interrupted by Stephanie who reveals that she faked a heart attack so that Ridge would marry Taylor. Bridget believes that fate is interrupting their weddings, and leaves Nick. Nick confesses his feelings for Brooke and the two get back together, but Bridget finds out that she is carrying Nick's baby, halting Brooke and Nick's reunion. Bridget and Nick marry, and she develops a close bond with his son, Dominick, whose mother is Felicia Forrester (Lesli Kay). Bridget gives birth to her stillborn daughter, Nicole, in February 2006 and their marriage ends. She then becomes romantically involved with Dante Damiano (Antonio Sabàto, Jr.), who is revealed to be Dominick's real biological father. Bridget and Dante opt to raise Dominick as their own when Felicia dies after a battle with cancer. However, when Felicia returns (having been kept alive by Stephanie), Bridget's relationship with Dante ends. Bridget once again discovers that she is pregnant, only to miscarry her child. Dante leaves town to work on a sculpture in Italy.

After Nick had married and divorced Taylor, Bridget wins Nick back, and helps him raise his son (and her biological brother) Jack Hamilton Marone. Bridget enlists the help of her aunt, Katie (Heather Tom), to convince Nick that she is the one for him. This backfires when Nick and Katie, who also helps take care of Jack, develop strong feelings for each other. While Katie is dying due to heart disease, she and Nick make love. Bridget and Nick marry shortly after, only to learn that Katie is pregnant with Nick's child, with Bridget once again leaving him. Katie has a miscarriage, and Bridget and Nick's divorce is finalized. Jackie remains hopeful, however, that the couple will reunite. This comes true in 2009, when Nick and Bridget once again remarry followed by a honeymoon in Hawaii. They attempt to have a child, with Aggie Jones (Sarah Joy Brown) acting as their surrogate, but she miscarries the child after a fall down the stairs. A heartbroken Bridget reacts by having sex with Jackie's younger husband, Owen. This led to Bridget's second pregnancy, with Nick leaving her after the truth about her affair with Owen comes to light. Bridget gives birth to a son, Logan Forrester Knight, in September 2010. Nick fires Bridget from Jackie M and divorces her. Later, Owen and Bridget start a relationship for Logan's sake, but they split in February 2012, and he returns to Jackie.

Bridget returns to Los Angeles for a brief visit in May 2013, having been residing in New York with Owen, Jackie and Logan. In August 2015, she returns for Rick and Maya's wedding, and in February 2016, she returned to visit her family and discuss what's been happening, including Brooke's feelings for Bill Spencer, Jr., who is married to Katie. In August 2018, Bridget returns for Hope and Liam's wedding. She returns the following month to attend Katie's marriage to Thorne, and later that Christmas to visit her family. She returns briefly in March 2020 to attend a family party reuniting Brooke and Ridge; however, the party turns sour when it is revealed that Brooke kissed Bill.

== Reception ==
For her portrayal of Bridget, Finnigan won the Outstanding Younger Actress in a Drama Series trophy at the Daytime Emmy Awards in three consecutive years: 2002, 2003 and 2004. Finnigan along with Jennifer Landon is the most awarded actress in this category, and in 2003 The Bold and the Beautiful made Daytime Emmy history when both Susan Flannery won the award for Outstanding Lead Actress in a Drama Series and Finnigan won for Outstanding Younger Actress for the second year running. In 2024, Jones was shortlisted for the Daytime Emmy Award for Outstanding Guest Performer in a Drama Series for her role as Bridget.

In November 2003, whilst discussing the current storylines and characters of The Bold and the Beautiful, Nancy M. Reichardt from the Edmonton Journal criticised Bridget's "illfated romantic entanglement" with Ridge after they realised that they were not biologically related, commenting, "That story can only be described as "icky." Finnigan is a truly talented actress, but it will be hard to recoup after this wildly unpopular plotline." In 2006, a writer from the Jamaica Gleaner said that Bridget's vulnerability is often "heightened by the fact that it's the people who are supposed to love her best who hurt her most", including her mother, as "Ideally, moms and daughters like to share things: clothes, secrets, recipes. But with Brooke and Bridget, it's been Bridget's spouses."

Ian Spelling from the Reading Eagle newspaper observed: "Like any good soap character, Bridget has experienced her share of ups and downs, calamities and moments of bliss." Tommy Garrett of Canyon News wrote that Jones "soon won over fans and critics alike" after taking over the role, which he described as one of the "most fascinating" characters on daytime television. In reference to Bridget's affair with Owen, Michael Logan of TV Guide called her "the scandal queen who split town last year after giving birth to her father-in-law's baby".

When Bridget and Owen shared a kiss in January 2009, Jamey Giddens of Daytime Confidential called them a "smoking hot couple-in-training" and wrote, "Finally, a sexy, young adult couple who isn't related". When Jones confirmed a Bridget and Owen pairing, Giddens said it was "a reason to keep B&B on my DVR." After Bridget's reunion with Nick in May 2009, Daily News writer Carolyn Hinsey said, "One could make the argument that Bridget could use a little self-respect, too, for hooking up with Nick ... again." In December 2011, Sara Bibel of Xfinity criticized the soap for portraying Owen falling in love with Bridget "off-camera" instead of giving them screen-time.

In 2022, Charlie Mason from Soaps She Knows placed Bridget 18th on his ranked list of The Bold and the Beautiful’s Best of the Best Characters Ever, commenting "Is Jennifer Finnigan's (and then Ashley Jones') character a doctor dedicated to healing? A fashion designer happy to hide behind the alias Madame X? We're still not sure and, therefore, fascinated!"
