= Brooke Logan =

Fictional character

- The Bold and the Beautiful character
- Katherine Kelly Lang as Brooke Logan
- Portrayed by: Katherine Kelly Lang (1987–present); Catherine Hickland (1987); Sandra Ferguson (1997)
- Duration: 1987–present
- First appearance: March 23, 1987
- Created by: William J. Bell
- Introduced by: William J. Bell and Lee Phillip Bell
- Book appearances: Collision Course (2013); Second Chances (2014); Sunset Love (2014)
- Crossover appearances: The Young and the Restless
In-universe information
- Other names: Brooke Forrester; Brooke Chambers; Brooke Jones; Brooke Marone; Brooke Spencer
- Occupation: Chemist; model; businesswoman
- Family: Logan
- Father: Stephen Logan
- Mother: Elizabeth Henderson
- Brothers: Storm Logan
- Sisters: Donna Logan; Katie Logan
- Spouse: Eric Forrester (1991–1993, 2005–2006); Ridge Forrester (1994–1995, 1998, 2003–2004, 2004–2005, 2009, 2009–2011, 2012, 2018–2022, 2025–present); Grant Chambers (1997); Thorne Forrester (2001); Whip Jones (2002); Nick Marone (2006–2007); Bill Spencer, Jr. (2017–2018)
- Sons: Rick Forrester; R.J. Forrester; Jack Marone
- Daughters: Bridget Forrester; Hope Logan
- Grandsons: Eric Forester III; Logan Forrester Knight
- Granddaughters: Nicole Marone; Lizzy Forrester; Beth Spencer
- Grandmothers: Helen Logan
- Nephews: Marcus Forrester; Will Spencer
- Nieces: Flo Fulton

Brooke Logan is a fictional character from The Bold and the Beautiful, an American soap opera on the CBS network. She has been portrayed by Katherine Kelly Lang since the series's debut in March 1987. The character is part of the original four central characters and actors (including her onscreen multi-decade, long love, and husband, Ridge Forrester, and his parents Stephanie and Eric). Over the years, she has developed into a business woman working at Forrester Creations and a mother to five children: Rick, Bridget, Hope, R.J. and Jack. Her character is described as having "emerged as the show's quintessential vixen, always in turmoil and forever symbolic of true love and destiny prevailing." The character has also had long-time rivalries with Stephanie Forrester and Taylor Hayes. In addition to Ridge (whom she married nine times), Brooke has also had marriages with Eric Forrester, Ridge's two half-brothers, Thorne Forrester and Nick Marone, her brother-in-law Bill Spencer, Jr., and several others, including marriages to Whip Jones and Grant Chambers.

== Casting ==
Katherine Kelly Lang debuted as the character in the soap's first episode on March 23, 1987, and continues to portray the role to this day. In 1987, she was briefly replaced by Catherine Hickland while Lang was on sick leave, with Hickland appearing on July 9 and 13 of that year. In 1997, Sandra Ferguson filled in for during Lang's maternity leave. In 2012, Lang announced that she had signed a two-year contract with the series, ensuring her stay until 2014.

Lang’s character has also crossed over to The Young and the Restless, appearing on January 6–8, 1999, May 11, 1999, and July 5, 2007.

== Development ==
Lang, who is known for her ready smile and engaging manner, has confessed to sometimes calling Ronn Moss (Ridge) his onscreen name, Ridge; "Sometimes I just call him Ridge out of habit" she has confessed to the Sydney Morning Herald. Lang said of the ongoing plots and twists in the relationship: "Ridge and Brooke will always be connected [but] the heart of the drama is what happens when true love is thwarted.". During an interview with Who! On January 29, 2008, actress Katherine Kelly Lang was asked "What do you like about your character Brooke Logan?", Lang stated "I like that she doesn't give up, no matter how depressed she may be or the bad things that she may be going through, she always bounces back", highlighting the continuing resilience within the character. She also said "I think she has a real grasp of things, even though she still doesn't have her love life under control but, hopefully, that will come together too," and at the end of the day she wants her character to be "Happy".

In mid-2010, Taylor's (Brooke Forrester's nemesis) daughter Steffy Forrester began going after Hope Logan (Brooke's now teen daughter)'s boyfriends. This re-ignited both Taylor and Brooke's rivalry and began a new generation rivalry. Bradley Bell stated on this: "is exciting to see Brooke and Taylor in the more maternal roles. Brooke has a daughter -- miraculously -- who is sweet and a virgin. She is just a darling; and Taylor has a daughter who is trouble. She knows how to manipulate men and she is very sexual [Like Brooke]". Of the character's "accidental" infidelity with her daughter's (Hope) boyfriend Oliver Jones, Lang stated: "She was excited and high on her hormones" during an interview with Michael Fairman.

== Storylines ==
=== Backstory ===
Brooke is the eldest of the Logan sisters. She studied chemistry during her early days in college. Brooke is the daughter of Beth and Stephen Logan, the elder sister of Donna Logan (Jennifer Gareis) and Katie Logan (Heather Tom), and the younger sister of Storm Logan (played by William deVry at the time of the character's death in 2008). She worked for Ruth Wilson’s catering business who often served rich pillars of the community (including the Forrester family).

=== 1987–present ===
Brooke and Ridge met when she asked her mother to help cater a Forrester party so she could meet Ridge. She fell instantly in love with the handsome playboy Ridge, who was engaged to be married to Caroline Spencer. After finding out that Ridge had spent the night with Alex, Caroline collapsed at the wedding and broke it off with Ridge. Caroline was raped shortly after that, and Brooke shortly befriended her after visiting her at the hospital. Brooke was so smitten with Ridge that she broke off her engagement to David, a police officer, because even her brother knew she would never be happy on a cop's pay. Hiding a letter Ridge wrote to Caroline spilling his heart to her and telling her he loved her, Brooke conspired with Thorne to keep Ridge and Caroline apart. Caroline became engaged to Thorne and Brooke and Ridge fell in love with each other, with Brooke becoming pregnant. Ridge and Caroline hid their true feelings for each other. Once Brooke lost the baby in a tragic miscarriage, Ridge broke off the relationship with her and began one with Caroline again. Caroline broke it off with Thorne after admitting she was still in love with Ridge, and they quickly married. A devastated Brooke turned to Eric for comfort and ended up pregnant, so Eric married her. After the death of Caroline Ridge met and fell in love with Taylor Hayes, the doctor who cared for Caroline. Despite this, Ridge was still involved with and loved both women, Brooke and Taylor, while Taylor herself was also involved with Brooke's brother Storm. Brooke created the wrinkle-free formula BeLieF for design house Forrester Creations and celebrated with Ridge by making love on the lab floor. Brooke and Ridge were intimate again when they believed that Eric wanted Stephanie back thanks to a forged letter from Stephanie. In the end however, Ridge chose Taylor as he did not want to be the cause of the end of Brooke and his father's marriage, and hoped if he chose Taylor, Brooke would stay with Eric. On the wedding day of Ridge and Taylor, Brooke ran to find them thinking she was pregnant with her and Ridge's child, when in fact she was pregnant with her and Eric's second child, Bridget. A paternity test was later conducted, with Sheila Carter tampering with the results and having everyone believe Ridge was the father; it would be years later before the truth about Bridget's true parentage was revealed.

When Ridge wouldn't leave Taylor, Brooke dated attorney Connor Davis, who informed Brooke she had a legal right to the BeLieF patent. Furious when Ridge tried to sweet-talk her out of her rights, Brooke obtained 51% of Forrester Creations and appointed herself CEO, even slapping Stephanie, who struck Brooke first. Ridge created and designed a men's line to honor the then CEO, at her request; Brooke fell into the pool and knocked herself unconscious when Ridge playfully shoved her. After Taylor was presumed dead in a plane crash, Brooke became engaged to psychiatrist James Warwick, but accepted Ridge's proposal instead. Brooke finally married Ridge in a lavish beach ceremony, then honeymooned with him in Morocco, where they were guests of Prince Omar Rashid. Once home, Brooke cared for Ridge when he was blinded in a lab accident and was horrified to learn that the hospital volunteer treating Ridge was actually Taylor, who had been saved by Omar but held prisoner in his palace. Brooke tried to keep Taylor's existence from Ridge, but when the truth came out, Brooke learned her marriage to Ridge was invalid. Brooke heaved a sigh of relief when Ridge asked Taylor for a divorce, clearing the way for Brooke to remarry Ridge.

Brooke later had a short marriage to a man named Grant Chambers in 1997; after giving him a friendly kiss, causing Ridge to propose to Taylor at a fashion show, Brooke rebelled by marrying Grant. However, their marriage was never legal due to a fraudulent sea captain who performed the ceremony. In 1998, Taylor became pregnant with her and Ridge's child; however, she told everyone the baby belonged to Thorne after seeing Ridge in bed with Brooke. In reality, a drunken Ridge had fallen into bed with Brooke while visiting her at her home, though he end things with Brooke before they could fully make love. Brooke later became interested in Thorne and overcame obstacles with him and his then wife, Macy. Macy was killed in a car accident, which Brooke survived. Thorne and Brooke parted ways, and she turned her attention back to Ridge, who was still married to Taylor. Brooke was later tricked by the Forrester family into traveling to Paris to keep away from the happily married Taylor and Ridge (who had since had twins, Steffy and Phoebe). After she came back, Brooke had an affair with her daughter Bridget's husband, Deacon Sharpe. Bridget was disgusted by this, and later Brooke gave birth to a daughter named Hope Logan as a result of the scandalous affair. Briefly during the pregnancy, she married a Forrester co-worker Whip Jones to cover up her adulterous affair.

When Taylor was murdered by Sheila Carter, Ridge and Brooke found their way back to one another. Sheila returned and later held Ridge, Brooke and the Sailor who arrived in L.A., Nick Marone hostage for ransom. Ridge was briefly presumed dead after falling into a fire pit, and Brooke slept with Nick while mourning. Ridge returned and Brooke later fell pregnant and gave birth to R.J. (Ridge Junior) Forrester. The baby was initially thought to be her and Nick's child, but later proved to be her and Ridge's. When Taylor returned from the dead In 2005, Stephanie Forrester faked a heart attack and asked for her dying wish to be Ridge and Taylor's reunion. Brooke moved out of Ridge's life, and began a relationship with Nick in 2006. She faced complications as Nick was also in an on-again, off-again relationship with her daughter Bridget. She and Nick divorced for the sake of Bridget's ill- fated pregnancy (the baby was stillborn). In 2007, Brooke tried to interfere with Ridge's relationship with Ashley Abbott. She left town after being practically pushed out by Stephanie, who had supported Ashley and Ridge's relationship.

Brooke started to go after Nick again. When Taylor and Nick (together now) decided to have a baby, they needed an egg donor. After baby Jack was born, it was revealed that Brooke was the biological mother of the baby and the eggs were hers through a mix up. Taylor had an emotional breakdown and recovered, and decided to share Jack with Brooke so that the child could have a biological connection. In 2009, Taylor and Brooke began to fight for Ridge's affections once again after Taylor's relationship with Brooke's much younger son Rick. Taylor and Ridge married; however, he returned to Brooke shortly after. In 2010, Brooke repeated history, as she had once done with Deacon and Bridget, when she accidentally had sex with Hope's then-boyfriend, Oliver Jones, and like Bridget, Hope forgave her. In 2011, Brooke and Thomas, while on a business trip to promote Thomas Forrester's Taboo men's line at Forrester Creations, ended up stranded on an island. While stranded, Brooke and Thomas ingested poisonous berries as a means of survival. The berries planted the idea that Brooke and Thomas had slept together. When they returned home safely, Stephanie teamed up with Thomas together to come up with the lie that he and Brooke had sex on the island, in order to break up her marriage with Ridge. This allowed Ridge and Taylor to nearly remarry, until Stephanie revealed the truth, allowing Ridge to reunite with Brooke. Ridge proposes to Brooke in Italy. Stephanie offers to organise the wedding at her house; it was a simple ceremony with only family as guests. Ridge and Brooke leave for their honeymoon after the speeches have taken place. While on their honeymoon, Brooke is in touch with Deacon via text, and Ridge finds out, but when he asks Brooke about it, she denies it. Ridge tells Brooke he can no longer take the lies and tells her he will not be returning home with her. Brooke arrives home without Ridge to deal with Katie.

When Katie, who is suffering from post-partum depression, walks out on the marriage, Brooke and Bill, Katie's husband, grow closer and share a kiss. When Katie's back, she forgives the two. Brooke and Bill collaborated to re-launch the Brooke's Bedroom line at Forrester Creations. Brooke and Bill spend time together and Brooke tries to help Bill with the distance in his marriage to Katie. Katie is upset at their growing closeness despite their reassurances that nothing was going on. Eventually Brooke and Bill begin an affair, but after sleeping together they decide to break things off for Katie's sake. After suffering worrying symptoms, such as a fever and not sleeping well, Brooke decides to visit her doctor. The doctor says that its menopause and that they will have to run tests. When Brooke gets the test results back, she is shocked to discover that she is pregnant with her and Bill's baby. Hurt and deeply upset, she turns to Eric, who's in a relationship with Taylor, and asks him to say the baby is his. In this way she hopes to keep her indiscretion from Katie and hide her pregnancy from Bill. Eric refuses and urges her to come clean to both Katie and Bill. Taylor who has suspected that Brooke and Bill were having an affair finds out about the pregnancy. At a surprise birthday party for Brooke, Taylor tells the guests including Katie about the affair. By that time, Brooke's body had mysteriously "absorbed" the pregnancy according to her doctor and she was hoping it would never come out.

In 2013, Katie goes missing shortly after giving birth to Will, and suffering from post-partum depression. Bill tracks Katie down in Aspen, Colorado, and Brooke helps him search for Katie. Brooke and Bill begin to act on their feelings for each other, hiding it from Katie, until Taylor found out. At a party for Brooke’s birthday, Taylor exposes Brooke and Bill’s affair in front of the Forrester, Logan and Spencer families, resulting in Katie screaming at Bill and Brooke. Brooke later criticised Katie when she decided to use her divorce with Bill to gain control of Spencer publications. Brooke reconnected with Bill in Monte Carlo, then traveled with him to Aspen, where he nearly fell from a cliff. As a result, Bill re-evaluated his recent decisions, and later returned to Katie. However, this did not last as Katie discovered that Bill was only trying to regain control of his company. Ridge returned to LA (now played by Thorsten Kaye), and the two reunite and almost remarry. However, Katie fainted at their wedding, and later revealed that she did it in order to stop the wedding due to her developing feelings for Ridge. Katie and Ridge have a brief relationship, and Brooke becomes jealous when Ridge proposes to Katie, giving her a red string instead of an engagement ring. Brooke helps Bill regain control of Spencer Publications, and the two go to the UAE to marry. However, Ridge arrives in time to stop the wedding with a picture of Bill in bed with Quinn Fuller. Bill exacted revenge on Ridge by having Justin throw him out of a helicopter. After disappearing briefly, Ridge returns with an impaired memory and had lost his design ability. Brooke was later furious when Ridge began having an affair with Caroline Spencer, Rick’s then-wife.

Brooke then finds herself caught between two men – Bill and Deacon, who had recently returned to LA to be a part of Hope’s life. Brooke then leaves LA for three months to work in Milan, Italy. Upon returning, she decides that she wants to be with Ridge, but he rejects her to marry Caroline. Brooke then turns to alcohol, and Deacon helps her deal with it by attending AA meetings with her. Brooke’s alcoholism resulted in her acting strangely at Bill and Katie’s second wedding, and also began raising suspicions from Quinn, who was then involved with Deacon. Quinn found out about Brooke and Deacon’s affair, and slapped her to the floor. Brooke then crashed Deacon and Quinn’s wedding by bringing Hope in via Skype in an unsuccessful attempt to stop the ceremony. Brooke and Ridge became closer after he revealed to her that he had a vasectomy, and that Thomas was the biological father of Caroline’s baby, Douglas. Katie decided to make amends with Brooke by offering her a job at Spencer Publications, which resulted in Bill and Brooke re-igniting their feelings. Bill and Brooke began to raise suspicions, causing Katie to begin drinking excessively. After Ridge manipulates Eric into kicking Rick, Maya and Nicole out of the Forrester Mansion, Brooke allows them to stay. Brooke began to resurrect her feelings for Bill but did not want to have an affair with him while married to Katie. Katie then found out about Brooke and Bill’s affair, resulting in a complicated divorce, with Katie receiving $50 000 000 from Bill, and the two sharing custody of Will. Bill promised Brooke his 12.5% stake in Forrester Creations, which Brooke would sell to Ridge in order to help him remove Quinn from the company. However, on the day of Brooke and Bill’s wedding, on Halloween 2016, Ridge stopped the wedding and won back Brooke after Bill left her at the altar. Ridge then proposed to Brooke at Stephanie’s grave, and eventually the two found their way back to each other.

In March 2017, the Forrester and Spencer families traveled to Sydney, Australia for Liam and Steffy’s third wedding. Ridge and Brooke decided to get married there as well, until Brooke discovered Quinn and Ridge kissing at a beach. Originally determined to tell Eric, Ridge and Quinn manipulated Brooke into keeping quiet, but broke off her engagement with Ridge. Brooke stayed in Sydney while everyone else returned to LA, and was comforted by Bill. Bill and Brooke finally marry in May 2017, and honeymooned in Paris. Their marriage ends when Bill confess to Brooke about burning Spectra Fashions, and that he punched Liam. Steffy convinces Brooke not to leave Bill, and that he is sorry. Brooke almost goes back to him until Bill almost killed Liam and Sally when Bill torn down the newly repaired Spectra Fashions building for his skyscraper. Ridge then wins Brooke back and marries her in 2018 at the Forrester mansion, with Stephanie's picture hanging on the fireplace. Stephanie's voice talks to Brooke at her wedding and tells her that she is proud of her becoming a better woman. Brooke tells Stephanie that she missed her every day and especially on her wedding day. Brooke's daughter Hope (Annika Noelle) faced a tragedy when her granddaughter Beth, was stillborn and her marriage to Liam Spencer ended. Brooke later learns that her brother Storm has a daughter named Flo Fulton, and that she gave her daughter Phoebe to Steffy to raise. Brooke happily welcomes Flo into the family. When Ridge's son Thomas (Matthew Atkinson) returns after Caroline died, he starts to pursue Hope and manipulates her into marrying him. Brooke disprove of their relationship because of Thomas's past with Rick and is worry about Hope because she still loves Liam and is still grieving over Beth.

However, when Ridge tells Brooke that Douglas told Liam, Steffy, and Hope that Beth is alive, Liam would not let it go and believes Douglas. Ridge assures Brooke that Douglas may have been confused, and has not check up on Liam with losing Beth. Also Ridge tells Brooke Liam stormed out of her house when he saw an error on Phoebes birth certificate, and wanted to talk to Flo. Brooke and Ridge then storms over to Forrester Creations, to get answers from Flo about Phoebe. Flo and her mother Shauna are there and Brooke asks Flo about Liam's assumptions about Phoebe being Beth. Flo confesses that she is not Phoebe's birth mother, but Hope is the birth mother. Brooke angrily demands Flo to tell her how Steffy has her granddaughter. Flo revealed that Dr. Reese Buckingham (Hope's doctor) owed people a lot of money from a gambling debt and that he needed the money fast or they would kill Zoe (Buckingham's daughter). Flo goes into detail that Reese stole Beth from hope when she passed out from labor, and that he switched Beth with another baby who was stillborn. Also Reese made Hope and Liam believe that the baby they were holding was Beth, and had Flo give Steffy Beth and collect the money from Taylor for the adoption for his debt. Flo tells Brooke and Ridge that Taylor had no idea what Reese was doing, and that she wanted to give Steffy a daughter for her to raise. Brooke then is shocked when Zoe knew what her father did and didn't say a word so that he won't get arrested. Zoe apologises to Brooke and Ridge for keeping Beth away from Hope and Liam. However Zoe and Flo tell Brooke and Ridge that Thomas knew about Beth and did not say anything because Hope would leave him for Liam. Also, Thomas had threaten them if they ever tell anybody about Beth being alive. Ridge then call UK police to let them now about Reese's crime and to have him arrested.

== Reception ==
The world-wide success of The Bold and the Beautiful has meant world-wide controversy among fans for this most controversial of characters. As far away from the U.S.A. as Kenya, men heatedly condemn this "evil" and "wicked" woman, while women praise her for being "independent and put[ting] men where they belong." In 2013, she received her first Daytime Emmy Award for Outstanding Supporting Actress in a Drama Series nomination for her portrayal of Brooke after 25 years of joining the soap. In May 2020, Lang received a Daytime Emmy Award for Outstanding Lead Actress in a Drama Series nomination for her work as Brooke. In 2024, she was shortlisted for the same award.

In 2022, Charlie Mason from Soaps She Knows placed Brooke third on his ranked list of The Bold and the Beautiful’s Best of the Best Characters Ever, commenting "The so-called “slut from the Valley” has come a long way, baby! But — thank goodness! — Katherine Kelly Lang’s character remains a slave to her (cough) destiny, as much passion’s plaything as she ever was." Mason also put Hickland's portrayal of Brooke on his list of the worst soap opera temporary recasts, commenting that it "didn't work" and adding that it is "downright impossible today to imagine anyone but Katherine Kelly Lang playing Brooke". In 2024, Mason included Brooke in his list of the worst mothers in American soap operas, writing, "Since this is daytime we're talking about, we could give her a pass for shtupping one of her daughters' husbands. But two? And yet another daughter's boyfriend? No. Sorry. No Mother's Day card for you, Brooke." Mason also placed Brooke 19th on his ranked list of Soaps' 40 Most Iconic Characters of All Time, writing, "Dubbed "the slut from the Valley" by her monster-in-law, OG cast member Katherine Kelly Lang's character has reminded us for nearly 40 years never to give up on "destiny"."

== In popular culture ==
R&B singer Tamar Braxton named her son Logan after the character of Brooke Logan, due to her husband's love of the show.
