= Schae Harrison =

American actress

- Born: Deborah Schaeffer
- Partner(s): Mick Cain (2001–present; 1 child)

Schae Harrison (born Deborah Schaeffer) is an American actress. She played Darla Einstein-Forrester on the American daytime soap opera The Bold and the Beautiful from 1989–2006. She reprised the role briefly in 2007, 2014, and 2015.

== Career ==
Harrison was studying acting at The Actors Workshop under R. J. Adams when she was discovered during a workshop showcase by CBS Casting Director Christy Dooley from The Bold and the Beautiful. The part of Darla Einstein-Forrester became Harrison's most notable role which she played for 17 years from 1989–2006. She was a contract cast member from 1989 to 1996 and between 2003 and 2006. She returned for two episodes in July 2007. Harrison has since made periodic appearances on a recurring capacity in March, April and November 2014 and in June and July 2015.

Harrison has also appeared in several feature films including Twice in a Lifetime, with Gene Hackman and Ann-Margret as well as starring as Zachery Ty Bryan's mother in the Disney feature Magic Island. In addition, she has appeared on Night Court, General Hospital, Who's the Boss?, Star Trek: The Next Generation, Freddy's Nightmares and Throb.

Harrison has also appeared in the Circus of the Stars telecast, performing the high-wire act. She performed songs on The Bold and the Beautiful Christmas Album.

== Personal life ==
Harrison is engaged to former B&B co-star Mick Cain. The two have a son, Haven Jude Cain, born in December 2003; Haven played her character's daughter on The Bold and the Beautiful for a brief period. The family currently resides in Southern California. In February 2019, Cathy Tomas, B&B Fan Club director, said that Harrison was diagnosed with chronic fibromyalgia and chronic fatigue syndrome, preventing her from working.
