= Daniel McVicar =

American actor, director and writer

- Born: June 17, 1958 (age 68); Independence, Missouri, U.S.
- Occupations: Actor, director, writer
- Years active: 1985–present

Daniel McVicar (born June 17, 1958; Independence, Missouri) is an American actor, director and writer known for his work in European films and American television.

== Early life and education ==
McVicar was born in Missouri and raised in Broomfield, Colorado. He studied at the California Institute of the Arts, the Stella Adler Studio, The Beverly Hills Playhouse and at the Royal Academy of Dramatic Art in London.

== Career ==
McVicar has a career spanning more than 40 years on television and film, with over 20 films to his credit.

From 1987 to 2009, he played fashion designer Clarke Garrison on The Bold and the Beautiful. He has made 17 recurring appearances on The Late Late Show with Craig Ferguson, where he was Craig's nemesis at CBS Television City.

He played Rock Hudson in the 1995 TV movie Liz: The Elizabeth Taylor Story.

He played Captain William T. Bell in "Maschi contro femmine" (2010), directed by Fausto Brizzi.

He starred opposite Ben Gazzara in two projects, the television miniseries Woman on the Run where he worked opposite screen legend Gina Lollobrigida, and A Kiss in the Dark with Gazzara and Patricia Millardet, as well as starring in Under the Sky for filmmaker Angelo Antonucci.

He was in The Fourth Planet, directed by award-winning Russian filmmaker Dimitris Astrakhan. Although Daniel starred as American astronaut Sam Straiton, the role called for him to speak entirely in Russian, which he had to learn while shooting on location in St. Petersburg.

He appeared in two Ezio Greggio comedies, “Silence of the Hams”, and “Screw Loose”, working with Mel Brooks.

He played the cult comic character Diabolik in the Tiromancino video clip “Amore Impossibile” alongside Claudia Gerini as Eva Kant.

In 2006, he released the short film "Always a First Time", which was directed, produced, and written by him. The film was named the best of the fest at the Salento Film Festival. He is also the creator of Late Night Mash, an award-winning show and community.

A former student of acting teachers Stella Adler, Lee Strasberg, and Milton Katselis and at the Royal Academy of Dramatic Art, he conducts Masterclasses at the International Cinema Academy in Milan.

== The European years ==
Daniel relocated to Italy in 2007, and worked with Italian filmmakers Fausto Brizzi (“Maschi Contro Femmine”), Giorgio Serafini (“Il Bene e Il Male”), Giulio Manfredonia (“Friends and Enemies”), Manetti Bros. (“L’Ispettore Coliandro”), Paolo Ruffini (“Fuga di Cervelli”), and provided the voice for Davide Ferrario’s documentary “Sexxx”.

He was cast in Polish director Jacek Bromski’s film “One Way Ticket to the Moon” playing Lt. Birnbaum.

He continued work in television, both in Variety programs such as “Treno di Desideri” and “I Raccomandati”, and appearing as a guest on shows hosted by Antonella Clerici, Mara Venier, Benedetta Parodi and Cristina Parodi, and others and has appeared in several television series.

He played a supercharged version of himself running a stunt school in a story arc on Fabio Volo’s television series “Untraditional”.

In 2022, he appeared in three films and a TV series: Massimo Paolucci’s “Soldato Sotto La Luna”, Stefano Milla’s “The Magic Penguin”, “Oltre” and a story arc in the second season of “Sport Crime”.

He was president of the inaugural Sorrento Film and Food Festival, held on January 1-6 2023, with awards going to Terry Gilliam, Enrico Vanzina, Noa, Susy Del Giudice and Giovanni Esposito, as well as Remo Girone, Victoria Zinny, Francesca Tizzano and Master Chefs Don Alfonso, Peppe Aversa, Pasquale Palamaro and Gennaro Esposito.

== New media ==
McVicar started the McVlog video blog in July 2006 and hosted the first annual Vloggies on November 4, 2006.

His work in the new media expanded to "The Late Nite Mash", an online show and creative community that has featured interviews with Andy García and music mashups with The Late Nite Mash musical director Joey Altruda and saxophone player Plas Johnson, integrated with community generated content from animators, vloggers and artists. Noteworthy episodes include a hangover remedy with French Maid Fifi and Freshtopia, and a discussion of the taser incident at UCLA with Mash experts Mistress Evolution and Mistress Abigail. He was named "Male Vlogger of 2006" by Lulu.tv.

His media company MagmaWave.com is based in Los Angeles and Turin, Italy.

== Personal life ==
Daniel McVicar is of Scottish, Irish and Polish ethnic descent. He is from a family of 12 siblings. He is the father of three children, two from his first marriage (1987-1996), Hank (1988-2011) and Maisy (born 1991), and Pietro McVicar (born 2012) from his marriage (2011-2014) to international figure skating judge Virginia De Agostini.

He is a member of Mensa.

== Selected filmography ==
=== Television ===
Year	Title	Role
2022	Sport Crime	Justin Keller
2018	Untraditional	
2013	Un Medico In Famiglia	Wayne
2009	Inspector Coliandro	Bob
1987-2009	The Bold and Beautiful	Clarke Garrison
2009	Good and Evil	Vittorio Jaboni
2006-2008	The Late Late Show with Craig Ferguson	McVicar
2000	Un Bacio Nel Buio	Paolo
1996	Goede Tijden, Slechte Tijden	Hotel Guest (uncredidet)
1996	Una Donna In Fuga	Giacomo Riboldi
1995	Land’s End	Night Eyes
1995	Liz- The Elizabeth Taylor Story	Rock Hudson
1992	A Women Scorned	
1991	I Lampsi / Η Λάμψη	Priest Jes / Ιερέας Τζες
1987	Houston Knights	Police Officer
1984-1986	Scarecrow and Mrs. King	Bartender in Play/ Agent with Lenin Photo
1986	Highway to Heaven	Honor Guard Captain
1985	Dirty Work	Lt. Mark McEvans
1985	Otherworld	First Guard
1985	Santa Barbara	Security Guard

=== Film ===
Year	Title	Role
2026	No Place to Be Single	Constantine
2024	The Thief of Falling Stars	Bartolo
2022	Soldato Sotto La Luna	Don Michele
2022	Fallen	
2019	Creators - The Past	Dan Anderson - Reporter
2013	Fuga Di Cervelli	Dean Perry
2013	One Way Ticket To The Moon	Prokurator, Colonel Birnbaum
2013	Una Notte Agli Studios	Mr. Frame
2010	Men vs Women	Captain William T. Bell
2001	Zana	Sandro
2001	Under the Sky	
1999	Pirates of the Plain	Karl (Bobby's Dad)
1999	Screw Loose	Big Man
1997	Kiss of Death	Aldo Botticelli
1996	Alone in the Woods	Dany Rogers
1995	Chetvyortaya Planeta	Sam
1994	The Silence of the Hams	Forensic Expert
1993	Scorned	Truman Langley
1993	Night Eyes Three	Thomas Cassidy
1992	A Woman’s Secret	Ryan

=== Others ===
Year	Title	Role
2011	Dark Resurrection Volume 0 (Short video)	Vicar
2004	Tiromancino - Amore Impossible (music video)	Diabolik
1994	Guardian Angel (video)	Hobbs
2010	Men Vs Woman	Producer
2006	Always a First Time	Producer, Writer, & Director
