= List of The Bold and the Beautiful characters introduced in the 2010s =

The Bold and the Beautiful is an American television soap opera. It was first broadcast on March 23, 1987, and aired on CBS. The following is a list of characters that first appeared in the soap opera between 2010 and 2019. All characters were introduced by the series' executive producer and head writer Bradley Bell.

== Graham Darros ==
Graham Darros was played by Justin Baldoni in 2010. Executive producer and head writer Bradley Bell announced the role in late 2009, describing Graham as "a well-known fashion photographer who is hired by Steffy to work for Forrester Creations. It soon becomes evident that he has a sinister and mysterious past with another major character." He spoke of Baldoni as "a compelling young actor who will be able to bring forth the intensity that is essential for the character of Graham."

== Beverly ==
Beverly was portrayed by Gina Rodriguez from 2011 to 2012. Beverly was named after Beverly Hills before being placed in foster care and is a friend of formerly homeless Dayzee Leigh (Kristolyn Lloyd). Stephanie Forrester (Susan Flannery), who befriended Dayzee on the street and bought Insomnia Coffeehouse for Dayzee to run, is impressed with Beverly's determination to make something of herself and convinces her family to hire Beverly as an intern at Forrester Creations. Hope Logan (Kim Matula) catches the inexperienced Beverly taking photos of Forrester gowns with her cell phone. Later, when the dresses show up on Jackie M's runway, Hope and Stephanie accuse Beverly of selling their collection to their competitor, prompting Beverly to run away. Stephanie's sister, Pamela Douglas (Alley Mills), the real thief, feels bad that Beverly is taking the fall for her. Jackie Marone (Lesley-Anne Down) affirms Beverly's innocence to Stephanie, noting that the intern had not worked at Forrester long enough to steal an entire line. Realizing their mistake, Stephanie and Hope track Beverly and Dayzee to a bus in Whittier; Stephanie stands in front of it to get it to stop. An angry Beverly dashes into a gated apartment complex, a transitional housing for kids who had aged out of the foster care system. Stephanie wears Beverly down by recounting her experience as an abused child, even admitting she had gotten pregnant and married Eric as a way out of her father's house. Beverly agrees to return to Forrester and then introduces Stephanie and Hope to other residents of the home. After meeting Rick Forrester (Jacob Young), Beverly gushed to Dayzee that he was "definitely into" her. Though a jealous Amber Moore (Adrienne Frantz) threatens Beverly to stay away, Beverly holds her own. She later stops appearing on the soap.

In 2021, Richard Simms from Soaps She Knows put Beverly on his list of the most hated soap opera characters, commenting that "Long before finding fame as Jane the Virgin, Gina Rodriguez played a young woman befriended by Bold & Beautiful's Stephanie Forrester. Beverly—who never got a last name—became the focus of an Afterschool Special social-issues storyline regarding kids who age out of the foster-care system before disappearing entirely."

== Othello ==
Othello
- The Bold and the Beautiful character
- Portrayed by: Othello R. Clark
- Duration: 2011–15, 2018
- First appearance: October 2011
- Last appearance: February 9, 2018
- Created by: Bradley Bell
- Introduced by: Bradley Bell
In-universe information
- Occupation: Dj; Music director for Forrester creations

Othello is a DJ and friend of Rick Forrester. He showed up for a party that Caroline Spencer made Rick take her to, even though he was with Maya and took her as well. Othello asks Rick about his girlfriend, Caroline, but Rick introduces Othello to his new girlfriend, Maya. He DJ'd for a party that Bill Spencer Jr. set Jesse Graves up at so Caroline, his niece, could be with Rick again. Othello then showed up to DJ the Hope for the Future line that would cement Rick's role as president.

Rick used Othello to lie to his sister Hope Logan that Hope's fiancée Liam Spencer had sex with his ex-wife Steffy Forrester the night before his wedding to Hope. Othello is reluctant to go along with Rick's manipulation and refuses to lie directly to Hope, but does confirm Rick's lies.

Othello showed up to help Bill and Brooke Logan climb a mountain in Aspen, Colorado. Bill slipped and was dangling off a cliff, but he saved himself from falling.

Othello questioned Oliver Jones about his relationship with Alexandria Forrester right after Ridge Forrester almost fired him, thinking that Oliver had found a way to keep his job.

Othello attended a Forrester meeting, and it was said that Othello was the music director for Forrester. Othello was surprised to learn that Quinn Fuller was gone from the company.

In December 2014, Maya invited Othello over to her new apartment, which Rick bought for her. Othello was surprised at how cocky she was, claiming it was only temporary until she got her mansion. Maya confided in Othello that she and Rick were back together and swore him to secrecy as Rick was pretending to reunite with Caroline despite her kiss with Ridge.

== Alison Montgomery ==
Alison Montgomery
- The Bold and the Beautiful character
- Portrayed by: Theodora Greece
- Duration: 2011–2018, 2026–present
- First appearance: December 5, 2011
In-universe information
- Occupation: Bill Spencer's executive assistant

Alison Montgomery was the assistant of Bill Spencer Jr. who did all of his dirty work. She also had a brief romance with Deacon Sharpe.

== Father Fontana ==
Father Fontana is portrayed by Luca Calvani in 2012 and 2013. Fontana was the priest who was supposed to marry Liam Spencer and Hope Logan in Italy before they ended up breaking it off. When Hope and Liam planned to get married a third time, Hope's mother, Brooke Logan, had Fontana come to L.A. to have a reenactment of what would have happened in Italy. Taylor Hayes came with her daughter Steffy Forrester (whom Liam also loves) and Steffy told him she was pregnant. Hope convinced Liam to stay with Steffy. Steffy lost the baby in a motorcycle crash. Hope and Liam planned to get married a 4th time, and concluded that maybe Fontana was a jinx.

== Dr Caspary ==
Dr Caspary is a gynecologist who helped Brooke Logan and Steffy Forrester during their pregnancies. She is portrayed by Jacqueline Hahn.

== Dr Meade ==
Dr Meade is portrayed by Jon Hensley. He is a doctor at University Hospital and has been involved in taking care of Katie Logan and Steffy Forrester. He is familiar with both the Logan and Forrester families.

== Adele ==
Adele was portrayed by Taja V. Simpson from 2012 to 2013. She was Katie Logan's assistant while she controlled Spencer Publications. Katie also frequently trusted Adele to look over her son, Will Spencer. Bill Spencer Jr., Katie's husband, took over the company, and Adele was fired and replaced by Bill's trusted assistant, Alison Montgomery.

== Carter Walton ==
Carter Walton
- The Bold and the Beautiful character
- Portrayed by: Lawrence Saint-Victor
- Duration: 2013–present
- First appearance: January 31, 2013
- Created by: Bradley Bell
- Introduced by: Bradley Bell
In-universe information
- Occupation: Actor; Businessperson; Lawyer
- Parents: Jerry Walton
- Siblings: Marcus Forrester (adoptive)
- Spouse: Daphne Rose (m. 2026)
- Nieces and nephews: Rosie Barber Forrester (adoptive)

Carter Walton, portrayed by Lawrence Saint-Victor, made his first appearance on January 31, 2013. In July 2020, he was promoted to series regular status.

Carter comes to Los Angeles to visit his adopted brother, Marcus Forrester (Texas Battle), who had also been adopted by the Forresters. Marcus proudly introduces Carter to his family, especially his wife, Dayzee Leigh. When Marcus brags about Dayzee's organizational skills, he runs across some mysterious adoption papers. Dayzee admitted she had long ago helped a woman named Maya Avant give up her baby for adoption since Maya was being wrongly jailed for a crime. Maya had recently returned and wanted her baby back, and Dayzee felt she might be in trouble since she had allowed attorneys to handle the adoption and did not know if money had changed hands. Carter studied the papers and informed Dayzee that Maya had a legal right to know who had adopted her baby.

Carter helped Marcus and Dayzee search for the adoptive family of Maya's daughter, only to find out that they had all died in a car crash. Later, Carter met Marcus' cousin, Rick Forrester. Rick explained that Forrester Creations had been having some problems with patents and counterfeit designs, and Marcus suggested that Rick hire Carter since that was Carter's area of legal expertise.

Carter met Maya and asked her out, not knowing that Maya had been interested in Rick until she found out Rick was hiding his identity as a Forrester. Carter brought Maya to the Forrester mansion for a dinner party and was oblivious when Maya was uncomfortable seeing Rick with his girlfriend, Caroline Spencer. He tries to woo Maya, but she is not interested.

Caroline gets an unsuspecting Carter involved in her next scheme to break up Rick and Maya. He is cast in a web series and is surprised yet excited when he learns that Maya has been cast in the show as well, thanks to Caroline. Later, Rick and Maya break up and Carter proposes to Maya. After hesitating, she said yes. She soon hit on Rick, which angered Carter and caused their breakup.

Since his split from Maya, Carter has been keeping busy with legal and celebratory work, including the weddings of Zende and Nicole (2017), Brooke and Ridge (2018), and Hope and Liam (2018). He was later involved in the latter two marriages' annulments. Also, Carter legalized Steffy's adoption of a child that she named Phoebe, unaware that it was Hope and Liam's daughter Beth who had been kidnapped from them. Carter then officiated Hope and Thomas's wedding in 2019.

When Carter sees Zoe Buckingham at Forrester Creations, he is drawn to her and engages her in conversation about her return. He starts to fall for Zoe and tries to warn her about Thomas, but Zoe defends Thomas and declares her love for him. Carter is called to officiate Zoe and Thomas's wedding but hopes Zoe has come to her senses. Thomas dumps a shocked Zoe at the altar for Hope. Carter feels bad for Zoe and praises her for standing up for herself. Afterwards, Zoe and Carter ended up getting closer. Carter is later promoted to COO by Eric and Ridge. Carter is surprised when his friend Zende Forrester returns to L.A. He and Zende catch up, and Zende meets Zoe. What Carter does not know is that Zoe is starting to fall for Zende.

Carter and Zoe's relationship increases to where Carter gives Zoe a key to his place and ends up proposing to her, an offer that she accepts. Carter then meets Zoe's sister, Paris Buckingham (Diamond White), who decides to stay in L.A for a while. Zoe tries to get Paris to leave L.A. in order to sabotage her romance with Zende, who has begun to develop feelings for Paris. Zende, however, responds by telling Zoe that he will not betray Carter, he genuinely likes Paris, and he no longer has feelings for Zoe. Carter begins to question Zoe on why she wanted her sister to leave L.A. Ridge catches Zoe and Zende arguing and learns about the pair's feelings. Carter is heartbroken when Ridge tells him that Zoe cares more for Zende than she does for him. Zoe tries to beg for forgiveness, but Carter refuses and calls off their engagement.

After his second failed engagement, Carter puts his energy into his work at Forrester Creations. Zoe tries to win Carter back, even having Quinn talk to him at his place. Quinn is still dealing with the consequences of her actions in trying to break up Ridge; Brooke and Eric are refusing to be intimate with her. Quinn discussed being lonely and Eric being cold to her even though he forgave her. Quinn and Carter then kiss and have sex. The next day, they realize it was a mistake, especially since Eric is a family friend and Quinn is married to him. However, Quinn and Carter almost had sex again until Zoe stopped by his place and went into his room. Quinn hides at the bottom of the bed. When Carter tries to kick Zoe out, she sees a woman's jacket. Zoe is heartbroken and leaves in tears. At work, Zoe interrupts a conversation between Quinn, Shauna, and Carter. She sees the same jacket that she saw at his place. Shauna covers for Quinn and lies and says that she is the woman that Carter had had sex with. Carter begs Zoe to forgive him and tells her that he still loves her. Zoe forgives Carter but warns Shauna to stay away from him.

Zoe and Carter are engaged again, but Paris becomes suspicious of Carter. Paris then overhears Quinn and Shauna confessing and learns about Carter and Quinn. Paris confronts Quinn and Carter for betraying Zoe and Eric. Both Carter and Quinn beg Paris not to say anything. Carter then becomes guilty and tries to get Quinn to come clean to Eric. However, Quinn refuses and warns him that they will lose everything. Eric and Quinn announce they are renewing their vows, and Eric wants Carter to officiate the wedding. Brooke, who wants Quinn out of Eric's life for hurting him in the past, begs Eric to rethink it. Before the wedding starts, Brooke overhears Quinn and Paris arguing and demanding she leave. Brooke questions Paris on her argument with Quinn. Paris apologizes to Brooke for not coming clean sooner but tells her the truth. Before Eric and Quinn can say "I do," Brooke stops the wedding. Brooke tells Eric that Quinn has hurt him again. Eric tells Brooke to leave, but Brooke calls out to Carter to tell Eric the truth. Carter finally confesses to Eric, which infuriates him. Eric lashes out at Quinn for hurting him again and kicks her out of the house and declares that she is fired, and that he wants a divorce. Afterwards, Paris calls Zoe and tells her the news. Zoe confronts Carter, calls off their engagement, and leaves L.A. for Paris.

In 2020, Candace Young and Charlie Mason from Soaps She Knows put Carter on their list of Daytime's Most Important African-American Characters, commenting that "Much more than TV's sexiest wedding officiant, Lawrence Saint-Victor's Forrester Creations exec is the rare good guy who just wants to settle down… usually with a woman who already has a guy that she's either kinda married to or sorta with. It's like that."

== Quinn Fuller ==
Quinn Fuller
- The Bold and the Beautiful character
- Portrayed by: Rena Sofer
- Duration: 2013–2022
- First appearance: July 12, 2013
- Last appearance: August 29, 2022
- Created by: Bradley Bell
- Introduced by: Bradley Bell
In-universe information
- Other names: Eve (2016); Vladimir Smirnoff (2016); Quinn Forrester; Quinn Sharpe
- Occupation: Jewelry designer
- Husband: Deacon Sharpe (2015–2016); Eric Forrester (2016–2022)
- Sons: Wyatt Spencer

Quinn Fuller is portrayed by General Hospital alumna and Emmy winner Rena Sofer. She plays the mother of Wyatt Spencer and is described as being "just as mysterious as her son" and "both will have secrets that can rock the entire soap." Sofer began taping on May 22 and made her debut on July 12. In August 2022, Soap Opera Digest exclusively announced that after nine years on the show, Sofer had chosen to depart the role of Quinn and last aired on the series on August 29, 2022.

Quinn Fuller owns a jewelry designer warehouse, Quinn Artisan Jewelers, in Los Angeles. When Hope Logan notices Wyatt's sword pendant looked eerily similar to the ones that Bill Spencer, Jr. and his son Liam always wear, she asks Wyatt where he got it from. He tells her that it was one of his mother's original designs, and years ago he discovered it in a vault until she decided to give it to him. Wyatt later introduces Hope and his mother at Quinn Artisan Jewelers. Hope asks Quinn about the sword necklace, to which Quinn claims that she did indeed design the pendant, but another jeweler could have made a similar design, which is why Bill and Liam also wear the same necklace. Quinn becomes very uncomfortable with Hope's questions about the sword necklace and the Spencers. After Hope leaves, Quinn tells Wyatt she is not right for him because of her high-society family, but Wyatt disagrees and continues to pursue Hope. Hope and Wyatt become friends, and Hope arranges for Quinn and Wyatt to have lunch at a restaurant. Bill and Liam are there and immediately recognize Quinn. Quinn then reveals that Bill is Wyatt's father. Bill and Wyatt are furious with Quinn for hiding the truth about Wyatt's paternity. Bill and Liam reach out to Wyatt, but he wants nothing to do with them. He eventually opens up to his father and half-brother. Bill notices that Wyatt has inherited many of the Spencer traits and similarities with Bill, making Liam very jealous, especially when Wyatt takes an interest in Hope. When Bill leaves his wife Katie Logan for her sister Brooke Logan, Wyatt hears Katie's story and immediately confronts Bill. He becomes physically violent when expressing his disapproval, and Bill disowns him. Wyatt returns to his mother and Quinn's Artisan Jewelers. Quinn is overjoyed to have Wyatt back and sees positive changes in him since he met Hope, but she is furious at Bill for disowning Wyatt.

Brooke encourages Bill and Wyatt to see the situation from the other's perspective. Caroline tells Bill that he is treating Wyatt the same way Bill Spencer Sr. treated Bill. Bill eventually accepts Wyatt again, and they start to establish a father-son relationship. Wyatt and Liam continue their rivalry for the affections of Hope, who hires Quinn Artisan Jewelers to supply her newly rebranded Hope For The Future line at Forrester Creations. Quinn and Wyatt are thrilled at the opportunity to work with Forrester Creations, and their company becomes internationally famous and profits enormously with the success of Hope's line. During this time, Quinn begins a flirtation with Eric Forrester and secretly sends Hope a tribute video Liam made for his ex-wife Steffy Forrester, which causes Hope to call off her engagement to Liam and become closer to Wyatt. Liam discovers Quinn sent the video to Hope and confronts her, but Quinn blames Liam for making the video and hiding it from Hope. Quinn then begins a rivalry with Donna Logan, Eric's ex-wife, both wanting Eric Forrester. However, she soon starts a flirtation with Bill, who is still in love with Brooke Logan, Hope's mother. On the day of Brooke's wedding to Ridge Forrester, Bill becomes drunk, resulting in Quinn and him having sex. Quinn then begins a romantic relationship with Deacon Sharpe. When Deacon proposes, Quinn begins to experience difficulties with Brooke over her objection to Quinn's involvement with Deacon. Despite Brooke's numerous attempts to split them apart, including calling upon Hope, Quinn marries Deacon at the Forrester beach house. Months later, Quinn tells Wyatt that she and Deacon are separated because their marriage was doomed from the start, because he is not a Spencer man, the only men that she has ever loved. Wyatt peppers her with questions. She says Deacon is a good man and that he went to Europe.

Quinn is later overjoyed to learn Liam and Steffy are done. Liam faints from a concussion he previously suffered, and Quinn drags him to his car and drives him to her remote cabin home to keep him away from Steffy. Over time, he comes to and, to keep him feeling safe, tells him they are a married couple named Adam and Eve Smith. While masquerading as his wife, Quinn truly opens up and falls in love with him while using his phone to further sabotage his relationship with Steffy. Deacon learns her secret, and she enlists his silence and assistance. Upon learning that Wyatt and Steffy are engaged, Quinn becomes determined to keep Liam away from Steffy by throwing him off a cliff. She chooses not to in the moment, and when Deacon asks why, she pushes him off the cliff to keep Liam for herself.

As Liam begins to remember, Quinn decides to quit her job at Forrester and go away with Liam, but is left conflicted when Wyatt and Steffy move their wedding forward, and she begins to worry Liam will no longer love her when he remembers their true history. Wyatt and Steffy marry on April Fool's Day in 2016, and a short time later, Wyatt finds Quinn and Liam together in the cabin. Liam begins to remember who he is and goes home with Wyatt after they lock Quinn in a cupboard. Deacon comes back and gets Quinn out of the cupboard. Quinn is eventually arrested for kidnapping Liam, but he drops the case against her after realizing that he has no case.

Quinn claims that her experience with Liam has changed her (as she opened up to him about being rejected as a child by her parents) and begins to secretly romance Steffy's grandfather, Eric, despite Steffy warning Quinn to stay away from her family. Eric and Quinn's relationship progresses, and they eventually tell their families, with Eric's children and grandchildren objecting. Eric ends things with Quinn after Steffy issues him with an ultimatum. However, when Eric, Steffy, Liam, and Wyatt go on a business trip to Monte Carlo, Quinn follows them there and resumes her relationship with Eric. Steffy catches them kissing outside a hotel and follows her (not knowing who it is) and is shocked to find out that it is Quinn. Steffy slaps Quinn to the ground and warns her to stay away from Eric. Everyone returns to L.A.; despite objections from his family, Eric continues to romance Quinn. He asks Quinn to move in with him, and they plan to get married. Thorne and Felicia come from Paris for the wedding, but Ridge and Steffy convince Wyatt and the Forresters to boycott the wedding in the hopes that Eric leaves Quinn. However, they get married, with Ivy being the only guest at the wedding.

After the wedding boycott, Eric confronts Ridge, Rick, Steffy, Thomas, and Zende and collapses in the CEO's office. He is taken to a hospital, and it is revealed that he suffered a brain aneurysm as a result of stress and an underlying medical condition. He is in a coma for a short time before recovering and returning home. During this time, Ridge lies to his family and pretends to have Eric's power of attorney, kicking Quinn out of the family and the Forrester estate. When Eric wakes up from the coma, he reveals that Quinn has power of attorney, kicks Ridge out of the mansion, and fires him as CEO, appointing Quinn as interim CEO in his absence. Quinn leads a successful fashion show as interim CEO and later convinces Eric to give the CEO position to Steffy in an attempt to reunite Wyatt and Steffy (who had gone back to Liam).

Shades of the old Quinn return when she has a fantasy in which she murders her new neighbour and rival for Eric's affections, Katie. Quinn then begins to develop feelings for Ridge after he sees her naked and takes care of her when she injures her ankle. Quinn and Ridge attempt to keep their feelings secret but are exposed when Eric's ex-wife Sheila Carter returns to town and learns of their affair. Sheila tells Eric in an attempt to manipulate him into divorcing Quinn. While Quinn and Ridge end their affair, Sheila continues to reinsert herself into Eric's life, manipulating Eric to let her stay in the Forrester mansion after a fight with Quinn; ultimately, Quinn exposes Sheila's schemes, and Eric sends her packing.

After a period of domestic bliss, Quinn's friend Shauna Fulton arrives in Los Angeles. When Quinn discovers Shauna's attraction to Ridge, she pushes Shauna to act on it to get back at Brooke.

Eric starts distancing himself from Quinn. She seeks solace from Carter, and they eventually fall in love with each other. They are eventually discovered. Despite initially being angry about the betrayal, Eric asks Quinn to continue having sex with Carter as he wants her to be fulfilled; Eric has erectile dysfunction and cannot satisfy Quinn in the bedroom anymore.

Eric's family discovers that Quinn is still having an affair with Carter and tries to influence Eric to split with Carter. Quinn stops the affair with Carter. Eric forgives her, but their love life is not the same.

Eric starts having a secret affair with his ex-wife, Donna Logan. Quinn is worried about Eric's health, so she gives him a tracker bracelet that monitors his heartbeat. Eric is unaware that the bracelet can transmit his heart rate to Quinn. While in the throes of passion with Donna, Quinn sees his heart rate escalate. She tracks him down and catches him in bed with Donna.

Meanwhile, Carter had been trying to get over his feelings for Quinn by getting engaged to Paris. Eric encourages Quinn to stop Carter's marriage. In a very comical scene, Quinn turns up at Carter's wedding disheveled, and Carter and Quinn run into each other's embrace, and passionately kiss to the shock of Paris and the wedding guests. Then, Quinn and Carter start a life together.

In 2022, Charlie Mason from Soaps She Knows placed Quinn 17th on his ranked list of The Bold and the Beautiful's Best of the Best Characters Ever, calling her a "jewelry designer who's harder than any metal she's ever welded into shape!", as well as jokingly saying that the last thing he would want to do is make Quinn "mad".

== Ivy Forrester ==
Ivy Forrester
- The Bold and the Beautiful character
- Portrayed by: Ashleigh Brewer
- Duration: 2014–2018, 2024–present
- First appearance: July 10, 2014
- Created by: Bradley Bell
In-universe information
- Other names: Ivy Spencer
- Occupation: Businesswoman; Jewelry designer
- Family: Forrester
- Father: John Forrester
- Mother: Claire Forrester
- Brothers: John Forrester Jr.
- Half-sisters: Jessica Forrester
- Husband: Liam Spencer (2015)
- Uncles: Eric Forrester
- Nieces: Electra Forrester
- First cousins: Ridge Forrester; Thorne Forrester; Angela Forrester; Kristen Forrester Dominguez; Felicia Forrester; Rick Forrester; Bridget Forrester; Marcus Forrester (adoptive)

Ivy Forrester, portrayed by Ashleigh Brewer, made her first appearance on July 10, 2014. In May 2014, it was announced that Australian actress Brewer had joined the cast of The Bold and the Beautiful in the role of Ivy Forrester. She began filming for the series on May 24, 2014, and initially signed a three-year contract with the show. Brewer told a writer for Soap Opera Digest that during her first meeting, she had successful chemistry read with Wyatt Spencer (Darin Brooks) and the producers decided to create a character with her. Brewer explained that Ivy was originally going to be American, before being changed to Australian and then English. After the producers had another think about it, they decided that she should be Australian. In January 2018, Brewer announced her departure from the role of Ivy; she cited her decision to focus on her acting career as her reason for leaving. On March 26, 2024, it was announced that Brewer would be reprising the role following a six-year absence and she made a guest re-appearance from April, 30 to May, 2. She returned on a recurring basis from October 22, 2024.

Ivy is Eric Forrester's (John McCook) niece and the younger daughter of John Forrester and his second wife, Claire Forrester. She is the half-sister of Jessica Forrester through John's first marriage to Maggie Forrester. She arrives in Los Angeles after she is brought in to work for the new jewelry design collection, Hope for the Future (HFTF) by Eric and Rick Forrester (Jacob Young), replacing Quinn Fuller (Rena Sofer).

After Liam Spencer's failed relationship with Hope Logan, Ivy and Liam began a relationship, though having to deal with the brief return of Liam's ex-wife Steffy Forrester. Steffy's actress, Jacqueline MacInnes Wood, noted that "in Steffy's mind, Ivy is just some new woman in town and Liam is fair game. He and Ivy have no history". Liam breaks up with Ivy at her cousin Alexandria Forrester's funeral to pursue a future with Steffy. Ivy then dates Liam's brother Wyatt Spencer. Ivy and Wyatt get more serious despite her attraction to and interference by Steffy's brother Thomas Forrester. Ivy accepts Wyatt's marriage proposal but privately tells Liam that she is still in love with him, which is overheard by Wyatt's mother, Quinn. Quinn tells Wyatt his fiancée wants Liam, and after initially denying it, Ivy and Liam both admit Ivy's lingering feelings for Liam.

== John Forrester ==
John Forrester
- The Bold and the Beautiful character
- Portrayed by: Fred Willard
- Duration: 2014–2015
- First appearance: October 2, 2014
- Last appearance: June 29, 2015
- Introduced by: Bradley Bell
In-universe information
- Occupation: Salesman
- Family: Forrester
- Brothers: Eric Forrester
- Wife: Maggie Forrester (divorced); Claire Forrester
- Sons: John Forrester Jr.
- Daughters: Jessica Forrester; Ivy Forrester
- Granddaughters: Electra Forrester
- Nephews: Ridge Forrester (legal); Thorne Forrester; Rick Forrester; Marcus Forrester (adoptive)
- Nieces: Angela Forrester; Kristen Forrester; Felicia Forrester; Bridget Forrester

John Forrester, played by comedian Fred Willard, made his first screen appearance on October 2, 2014. John had previously been mentioned on-screen by other characters, but never seen. Willard's casting was announced on August 25, 2014, and he began filming on August 27. He will appear in four episodes. John is the older brother of Eric Forrester (John McCook) and the father of newcomer Ivy Forrester (Ashleigh Brewer). John came to visit Ivy and Eric while he was in the United States. Michael Logan from TV Guide reported that John is "a traveling salesman-inventor and quite the party boy".

For his portrayal of John, Willard was nominated and won for Outstanding Special Guest Performer in a Drama Series at the 42nd Daytime Emmy Awards.

== Nicole Avant ==
Nicole Avant
- The Bold and the Beautiful character
- Portrayed by: Reign Edwards
- Duration: 2015–2018
- First appearance: January 16, 2015
- Last appearance: January 18, 2018
- Introduced by: Bradley Bell
In-universe information
- Other names: Nicole Dominguez (former married name)
- Occupation: Jewelry model for Forrester Creations; Former College student at the University of California at Los Angeles
- Father: Julius Avant
- Mother: Vivienne Avant
- Sisters: Maya Avant
- Half-sisters: Sasha Thompson
- Husband: Zende Forrester Dominguez (2017–2020)
- Daughters: Lizzy Forrester
- Grandfathers: Myron Avant
- Uncles: Claude Avant
- Aunts: Maisie Avant; Caroline; Carleen
- Nieces: Lizzy Forrester (legal)
- First cousins: Alexander Avant

Nicole Avant, played by Reign Edwards, first appeared January 16, 2015. The character and casting were announced on December 2, 2014. Edwards auditioned for the part and noted that she was the youngest there. Despite feeling good about her audition, she did not expect to be cast. As of May 2018, Edwards is on recurring capacity with the soap.

Nicole is the younger sister of established character Maya Avant (Karla Mosley). Edwards said the sisters share a few similarities, but they would "have their differences". She added "I think Nicole is going to bring something pretty cool to the table for everybody."

Nicole turns up at Forrester Creations looking for her older sister, Maya. She later finds her at the house and explains she is now living in LA and attending UCLA. Weeks later, Nicole returns and asks Maya if she can stay with her, as she has lost her apartment. Maya's partner, Rick Forrester (Jacob Young), tells her she can stay with them, but Maya says Nicole is fine and sees her out. Nicole later returns, and Rick invites her to move in after learning she is staying on a friend's couch. Nicole and Maya talk and attempt to reconcile their differences. During a confrontation, Nicole tells Maya that she knows she was born a boy named Myron and has transitioned.

== Sasha Thompson ==
Sasha Thompson
- The Bold and the Beautiful character
- Portrayed by: Felisha Cooper
- Duration: 2015–2017
- First appearance: December 14, 2015
- Last appearance: February 15, 2017
- Introduced by: Bradley Bell
In-universe information
- Other names: Sasha Avant
- Occupation: Model for Forrester International
- Father: Julius Avant
- Mother: Lucy Thompson
- Stepmother: Vivienne Avant
- Half-sisters: Maya Avant; Nicole Avant
- Grandfathers: Myron Avant
- Uncles: Claude Avant
- Aunts: Maisie Avant
- Nieces: Lizzy Forrester
- First cousins: Alexander Avant

Sasha Thompson, played by Felisha Cooper, first appeared December 14, 2015. In January 2017, Cooper was put on recurring status with the show.

Sasha arrives in Los Angeles and is reunited with the Avant family. While Vivienne Avant (Anna Maria Horsford) is delighted to see her, Julius Avant (Obba Babatundé) seems bothered that she unexpectedly shows up. When Vivienne leaves for a job interview at the DMV, Sasha and Julius have a somewhat awkward yet very tense conversation. Julius tells Sasha countless times to go back home to Chicago, but Sasha insists she stay in town. Soon, Sasha is reunited with her childhood best friend, Nicole Avant (Reign Edwards). Nicole brings Sasha over to Forrester Creations to give her the tour and to introduce them to her boyfriend Zende Forrester Dominguez (Rome Flynn). Nicole also reveals to Sasha that she is pregnant, serving as the surrogate for Rick Forrester (Jacob Young) and Maya Avant (Karla Mosley).

When Nicole leaves for a moment, Sasha eyes an elegant dress and decides to try it on. While she begins changing, Zende walks in and believes Nicole is behind the changing wall, but is stunned to see Sasha wearing only her bra and underwear. Sasha begins showing interest in Zende, not knowing who he is, and he is dating Nicole.

Later on, Sasha arrives at the Forrester mansion and is reunited with the entire Avant family, including Maya. Julius continues to show disgust that Sasha is in town and once again tells her to leave and go back home, but Sasha refuses every time. Sasha then reveals that she and Julius share a secret that the rest of the family is not aware of.

Sasha stops by the motel to visit Vivienne, but she has to run out to the store. While alone, Sasha and Julius continue their bickering. On December 21, during another argument, Sasha reminds Julius that they are father and daughter.

Sasha gets involved with Zende after he leaves Nicole, but no one accepts their relationship. After a confrontation with Nicole about Zende, Sasha reveals to her that they are half-sisters. Nicole refuses to accept her into the family, and Julius and Vivienne split up for a while when she realizes he had an affair with Sasha's mother.

When Nicole gives birth to Rick and Maya's daughter, Lizzy, Zende decides to reunite with her. Knowing that Zende and Nicole are getting back together, Sasha tells them she is pregnant. She then confesses that she was lying, and Zende dumps her. After a family meeting and much soul-searching, Nicole, Vivienne, and Maya forgive Julius and Sasha for their lies.

Sasha continues her work at Forrester Creations, and she gets closer to Thomas Forrester (Pierson Fodé) when he defends her from Julius' verbal attack, and Sasha thanks Thomas with a kiss. Sasha and Thomas start dating, but Nicole thinks Thomas still has feelings for his baby mama, Caroline Spencer (Linsey Godfrey). When Caroline returns to town with Thomas' son, Douglas Forrester, wanting the three of them to be a family, Sasha ends things with Thomas, not wishing to stand between him and his child.

Sasha returns to Zende's orbit again when Maya and Rick want Nicole to carry a baby for them a second time. Sasha supports Zende, who does not approve of coming in second to Nicole's surrogacy again. Sasha gets a surprise trip to Hawaii when a drunk Zende whisks her away upon hearing that Nicole is going through with the surrogacy. On the plane ride home, Sasha and Zende kiss and then have sex, but Nicole, who has changed her mind, catches them together. Sasha apologizes but defends Zende's position; when Nicole refuses Zende's repeated marriage proposals, Sasha tells Nicole she still wants Zende and asks him where things stand between them, but Zende clarifies his heart is with Nicole.

Months later, hearing Nicole has finally agreed to marry Zende, Sasha asks Nicole for forgiveness, wanting to be a family again. Nicole forgives her, and Sasha attends Nicole and Zende's wedding, watching them exchange vows and giving them her blessing. Sasha later gets a job promotion and moves to Paris.

== Sally Spectra ==
Sally Spectra
- The Bold and the Beautiful character
- Portrayed by: Courtney Hope
- Duration: 2017–present
- First appearance: January 31, 2017
- Created by: Bradley Bell and Michael Minnis
- Introduced by: Bradley Bell (2017); Anthony Morina and Josh Griffith (2020)
- Crossover appearances: The Young and the Restless
In-universe information
- Other names: Sally Abbott
- Occupation: Businesswoman; Fashion designer; Executive assistant
- Sisters: Coco Spectra
- Spouse: Billy Abbott (m. 2026)
- Children: Ava Newman; Ruby Spectra Abbott
- Stepchildren: Johnny Abbott; Katie Abbott
- Grandparents: Shirley Spectra
- Other relatives: Sally Spectra; C.J. Garrison; Macy Alexander; Darla Forrester (adoptive)

Sally Spectra (also Abbott), played by Courtney Hope, first appeared on January 31, 2017. In March 2018, it was announced that Hope would exit the role of Sally. She made her last appearance on April 5, 2018. On April 19, 2018, Hope announced she was back filming as Sally, and she made her re-appearance on June 15, 2018. In August 2020, Hope announced that she has been let go from the series, making her last appearance on August 5, 2020. Later in the month, it was announced that the actress would be joining the cast of The Young and the Restless. In October 2020, it was revealed that Hope would be portraying Sally Spectra crossing her over to ‘’Y&R’’. She made her first appearance on November 3, 2020. In 2024, Hope won her first Daytime Emmy Award for Outstanding Supporting Actress in a Drama Series for her role as Sally on The Young and the Restless.

=== The Bold and the Beautiful ===
Sally is the grandniece of Sally Spectra (Darlene Conley) and the granddaughter of Sally's sister, Shirley Spectra (Patrika Darbo). Bill Spencer Jr. (Don Diamont) and C.J. Garrison (Mick Cain) agree for him to purchase the land in which Spectra Fashions sat and to knock the building down for land clearance to build a new Spencer Publications office. This job would take six months to prepare, which gave C.J. enough time to see younger (first cousin once removed) Sally Spectra off in an attempt to re-open Spectra's doors as a fashion house to rival Forrester Creations, repeating history. Sally hires a team resembling that of the old Spectra Fashions gang and - in the best, most efficient way possible - hires their relatives! Joining this also larger-than-life Sally are her grandmother Shirley, Saul Feinberg's grandson Saul Feinberg Jr. (Alex Wyse) and Darlita (Danube Hermosillo), the receptionist, who has no relation to Darla Forrester (Schae Harrison).

Sally is shown having a cocktail at LL Giardino, flirting with a bartender, when she is called by her great aunt, the original Sally Spectra (Darlene Conley), to save the old Spectra building and revive Spectra Fashions. Sally begins building a social media presence by pulling humiliating stunts at Steffy Forrester's (Jacqueline MacInnes Wood) expense to garner free publicity and media attention for Spectra fashions. She begins dating Thomas Forrester (Pierson Fodé) and builds a relationship with him. Her grandmother Shirley (Patrika Darbo), whom Sally refers to as "grams" pushes her to leave Thomas, fearing it might take her focus away from reviving Spectra Fashions. She invites eye-on fashion reporter Jarrett Maxwell (Andrew Collins), who works for Spencer's publications to an early preview of Spectra fashions. Maxwell takes a liking to Sally's designs, angering his boss, Bill Spencer. Bill writes a disparaging article against Sally and Spectra fashions while using Maxwell's name on the article in an attempt to destroy the business and quickly push through the sale of the old Spectra building.

This causes a major setback for Sally, but she continues to rebuild Spectra Fashions with similar tactics to those done by her grandaunt Sally. Her grandmother, Shirley, secretly places a hidden camera on her sister, Coco (Courtney Grosbeck). Coco heads off to work as an intern at Forrester Creations. Coco remains unaware of the hidden camera, allowing both Shirley and Sally access to all of Forrester's fashion designs before their runway debut.

Sally tries to break up with Thomas in an attempt to absolve herself of any guilt from stealing Forester's designs, causing suspicion from Steffy, who confronts her about it. Sally mimics all of Forrester's designs with slight alterations and launches her runway debut a day earlier to the Forresters. The runway debut becomes a success and angers Steffy, who accuses Coco of betrayal, nearly causing her to lose her job. However, this success becomes short-lived when the Forresters sue Sally, and Sally is arrested and charged with grand larceny and industrial espionage. This causes Spectra Fashions to temporarily cease all operations. Thomas decides to help Sally by buying the Spectra building against Bill and investing millions, reviving Spectra's fashions once again. He becomes a co-partner with Sally and the head designer of the business.

Bill goes all out in taking Sally down from rigging a charitable fashion contest between Forrester Creations and Spectra fashions to having his attorney Justin Barber (Aaron D. Spears) set the Spectra building on fire after learning that the building has electrical and wiring issues. Sally's business goes up in flames, and Thomas leaves her after Bill lies to him, telling him that his niece Caroline (Linsey Godfrey) whom Thomas shares a child, is dying.

Sally is left with no option but to sell the building to Bill. However, Bill's son Liam (Scott Clifton) temporarily takes over as CEO from his father and gifts Sally the deed to her building out of compassion. However, that gift becomes voided due to legal loopholes found by Justin, allowing Bill to go ahead with demolishing the building.

On the day of the demolition, Sally and her crew decide to stage a protest inside the old Spectra building, preventing Bill from demolishing it. Bill threatens them, but Liam decides to return along with Sally. Justin tries to text Bill, warning him that Liam and Sally are still inside, but Bill does not see this text until after he pulls the trigger, blowing up the Spectra lot. Under the rubble of the building, Sally and Liam are trapped, and the two share a kiss, thinking that they are not going to survive. Bill and Steffy manage to rescue them.

Sally briefly leaves along with the rest of the Spectra team. She returns a few months later as a designer for Forrester Creations and has a brief relationship with Wyatt Spencer (Darin Brooks). Wyatt tries to dump her when his former high school girlfriend, Flo Fulton (Katrina Bowden), comes to town. Sally becomes jealous of Flo and is highly obsessive about Wyatt. She fakes having a terminal illness to keep Wyatt away from her. She does this with the help of Dr. Penny Escobar (Monica Ruiz). Flo finds out and is knocked out by Penny while Sally decides to abduct Flo and chain her to the radiator in her apartment. Flo manages to send help to Wyatt by writing on Sally's undergarments, and is saved by Wyatt. The two decide not to press charges against Sally and Penny, but Wyatt tells Sally to leave Los Angeles so both sides can heal and move on.

=== The Young and the Restless ===
After leaving her life in Los Angeles and Forrester Creations behind, Sally decides to move to Genoa City, Wisconsin. She gets hired by Lauren Fenmore (Tracey E. Bregman) as her executive assistant at Jabot. During her time there, she forms rivalries with Summer Newman (Hunter King) and her fiancée Kyle Abbott (Michael Mealor). She also develops a love interest in Kyle's father Jack Abbott (Peter Bergman) to Phyllis (Michelle Stafford) dismay.

Summer becomes threatened by Sally, fearing that Sally might take her job. Summer starts digging into Sally's past, trying to find any leverage to use against Sally despite Kyle warning her not to turn Sally into a threat. She flies to Los Angeles and talks to Wyatt Spencer (Brooks) and Flo Fulton (Bowden). Wyatt decides not to expose Sally out of respect, but Flo tells Summer everything. Summer uses it against Sally and taunts her with it. This causes Sally to retaliate. She is unable to find anything to use against Summer, but can find something against Kyle. Theo Vanderway (Tyler Johnson), Kyle's cousin, decides to give Sally leverage against Summer and Kyle. He tells Sally of Kyle's secret affair and child with Tara Locke (Elizabeth Leiner), who happens to be married to a ruthless businessman named Ashland Locke (Richard Burgi).

Sally tells Kyle that she knows about his secret affair with Tara, which Kyle tells Summer about, prompting both sides to cease fire.

Phyllis continues to warn Jack about Sally to no avail and tries to run Sally out of town by asking Lauren to relocate her back to Los Angeles. Sally goes after Summer's job and hatches a scheme with the help of Tara. She flies back to Los Angeles to meet with Eric Forrester (John McCook), and she asks Eric for help in securing a prominent fashion job for Summer in Milan on the promise that she will leave the Forresters and Spencers alone.

In Genoa City, Tara threatens Summer by taking Harrison (Kyle's son) away if she does not leave Kyle. Summer reluctantly agrees and leaves for Milan after receiving a job offer in fashion. She tells Lauren to give her job to Sally, which raises suspicions with Phyllis.

Phyllis investigates and finds evidence against Sally. She has Sally's accomplice Tara arrested for fraud and embezzlement and exposes Sally's schemes to both Lauren and Jack. Lauren fires Sally, and Jack ends his relationship with her. Sally becomes briefly unemployed but is recruited by Chloe Mitchell (Elizabeth Hendrickson) as a segment producer for Newman Media. She helps Chloe launch the company's fashion platform, 'Newman Fashions'. Sally also begins a relationship with Adam Newman (Mark Grossman), which raises concerns with Chloe. Victor Newman (Eric Braeden) warns Adam not to date Sally. Adam decides to keep a professional working relationship with Sally but begins to have feelings for her.

Sally schemes again after overhearing Victoria Newman (Amelia Heinle) discussing wedding gown options with her former boss, Lauren. Sally sketches a wedding dress for Victoria and plans to switch Lauren's dress with hers on the day of Victoria's wedding to Ashland Locke. She flies to Tuscany as Adam's plus one and manages to switch out both dresses. She later makes a desperate plea to Victoria to wear her dress, which Victoria agrees to. The dress gains widespread publicity for both Sally and Newman Media, and angers Lauren, causing a strain on her family relationship with Chloe.

Adam's ex-wife Chelsea (Melissa Claire Egan) returns to town and joins Newman Fashions. She meets Sally, but takes no liking to her, knowing her history, and Sally knows about Chelsea's history. Chelsea admits to having strong feelings for Adam despite her previous attempt to frame him for the attempted murder of Ray Rosales (Jordi Vilasuso). She becomes increasingly jealous of Sally after learning from Chloe that Sally might be dating Adam. She catches both Adam and Sally hanging out in Adam's Office on New Year's Eve, which Chelsea confronts Adam about. Later, Chelsea wants Sally fired and pushes Chloe multiple times to fire Sally, but Chloe refuses due to Sally's talents.

When Victor sells Newman Media to Victoria and her company, Newman-Locke, the fate of Newman Fashions remains in question. Chelsea and Chloe beg Victoria not to pull the plug on Newman Fashions, but Victoria does so, expressing no further interest. This prompts Chelsea and Chloe to form their own start-up company; however, Chelsea insists that Sally does not join them. Chelsea and Chloe break the news to Sally and tell her it is time for them to go their separate ways. Sally feels betrayed and accuses Chelsea and Chloe of trying to oust her in an attempt to form their own company. She mocks Chelsea and calls Chloe a fool for listening to Chelsea.

Later on, after learning of Sally's situation, Adam decides to give Sally a business executive position at Newman Media. Sally is hired as a COO (Chief operating officer) for the company. She admits to Adam that she has strong feelings for him. Adam also admits that he wants her. The two caved into their desires and had sex on Valentine's Day.

Following the news that Ashland Locke (Robert Newman) faked having cancer, Sally comes clean with Adam and discloses her past of doing the same thing with Wyatt. She becomes very supportive of Adam and often tries to guide him in the best, often right direction. When Adam loses his temporary position of CEO and position of CO-CEO and his step-mother Nikki Newman (Melody Thomas Scott) of Newman Enterprises, Sally advises Adam to leave, knowing he will never be fairly treated by his father Victor and the Newmans. Adam refuses and tells Sally he wants full control of Newman Enterprises, to which Sally agrees to help. Later, Sally sees Victoria at Society and tries to persuade her to take her ex-husband Ashland back.

Victoria eventually caves into her feelings and takes Ashland back, angering Victor and leading to a massive feud between the two. Victoria leaves her CEO position at Newman Enterprises, paving the way for Adam to take over. Sally then takes Adam's place as the new CEO of Newman Media. Sally also offers her previous Job as COO to Chloe when Chloe starts to have problems with Chelsea on their new start-up with Lauren.

Adam and Sally's position at Newman becomes jeopardized when Victoria reveals that she staged everything to gain Ashland's trust and retrieve the remaining $250 million of the $500 million that was paid out to him by Victor. Adam becomes infuriated knowing that Victoria will come back for her CEO position. Victor reinstates Victoria and his wife Nikki as co-CEOs of Newman Enterprises with Nick (Joshua Morrow) returning as the company's new COO.

At Chancellor Park, Jack sees a frustrated Sally sitting on the bench. She vents out her frustrations to Jack about how badly Victor and the rest of the Newman family continue to mistreat Adam. Jack tells her that the Newmans have always been complicated, as Victor tends to constantly manipulate his children. He tells Sally that he is happy that she and Adam found each other, but warns her that Adam tends to overreact when emotionally wounded and that Sally should take care of herself.

Sally returns to her office, seeing Adam in his dark state. She offered to take back her position as COO if Adam wanted his CEO position at Newman Media back. Adam refuses and reassures her that he has the intention of taking it back and wants her to have it. She knows that Adam had recently talked to Ashland and pleaded with him not to let Ashland exploit his anger and go down the path of revenge against the Newmans, as it will backfire. Adam decides to leave Newman Media.

Adam later breaks up with Sally, and Sally moves on and dates his brother Nick (Morrow). She remains as CEO of Newman Media temporarily until Victoria replaces her with Nate Hastings (Sean Dominic). Later, she and Adam have sex one last time, which leads her to become pregnant with his child, their daughter. However, Sally and Adam's relationship didn't last long because Adam cheated on Sally with his ex-wife, Chelsea Lawson leading Sally to dump Adam after he repeatedly lied to her. Sally then pursues a relationship with Adam's main nemesis, Billy Abbott (Jason Thompson) in which she and Billy later get engaged and then conceive a child together.

== Saul Feinberg ==
Saul Feinberg
- The Bold and the Beautiful character
- Portrayed by: Alex Wyse
- Duration: 2017–18
- First appearance: February 3, 2017
- Last appearance: March 5, 2018
- Introduced by: Bradley Bell and Michael Minnis
In-universe information
- Occupation: Tailor at Spectra Fashions
- Grandparents: Saul Feinberg

Saul Feinberg II, played by Alex Wyse, first appeared on February 3, 2017. The character and casting was announced on January 31, 2017. In March 2018, it was announced that Wyse had departed the cast, due to the end of the Spectra storyline.

Saul is the grandson of Saul Feinberg, the tailor of Spectra Fashions, and a friend of Sally Spectra (Conley). Saul is hired by Sally's namesake, Sally Spectra (Hope), as a tailor like his grandfather to help re-open Spectra Fashions. He is shown to be insecure at times due his to feelings for Sally.

== Darlita ==
Darlita, played by Danube Hermosillo, first appeared on February 9, 2017. is Sally's unpaid receptionist at Spectra fashions. Her name and character are a take on Darla Forrester (Schae Harrison), who was previously a receptionist at Spectra. She is portrayed as dimwitted in her job and frequently speaks incoherently, despite her best efforts. Before the launch of Spectra fashions, Saul (Alex Wyse) introduces Darlita to Sally (Courtney Hope) as a potential hire. Sally is reluctant at first, prompting Darlita to make a passionate but humorless plea. She tells Sally that if she hires her now, "she'll live to regret it," when she meant to say "she won't regret it". Sally hires her anyway, and throughout the season, the character has been used multiple times for comedic scenes. In March 2018, it was announced she would depart the cast, due to the end of the Spectra storyline.

== Coco Spectra ==
Coco Spectra
- The Bold and the Beautiful character
- Portrayed by: Courtney Grosbeck (2017–2018); Ashley Campbell (since 2026)
- Duration: 2017–2018, 2026
- First appearance: February 24, 2017
- Created by: Bradley Bell and Michael Minnis
- Introduced by: Bradley Bell (2017); Sally McDonald (2026)
- Crossover appearances: The Young and the Restless
In-universe information
- Occupation: Fashion influencer Intern at Forrester Creations (2017–2018)
- Sisters: Sally Spectra
- Grandparents: Shirley Spectra
- Nieces and nephews: Ava Newman; Ruby Spectra-Abbott

Coco Spectra, played by Courtney Grosbeck, first appeared on February 24, 2017. In September 2026, it was announced that Coco would be reintroduced on The Young and the Restless, with Ashley Campbell assuming the role. She first appeared in the October 8, 2026, episode.

Coco is the teen sister of Sally Spectra (Hope), the grand-niece of Sally Spectra (Conley), and the granddaughter of Sally's sister, Shirley Spectra (Darbo). She was previously an intern at Forrester Creations and briefly dated RJ Forrester (Anthony Turpei). In 2026, Coco arrives in Genoa City to celebrate Sally's bachelorette party.

== Mateo ==
Mateo, played by Francisco San Martín, first appeared on October 2, 2017. In November 2017, it was reported that the character had departed, though it was teased that he could return in the future.

Mateo is introduced as the Forrester Estate manager, who is hired by Sheila Carter (Kimberlin Brown) to seduce Quinn Fuller (Rena Sofer) and cause her to betray Eric Forrester (John McCook)'s trust and have an affair, leading to the eventual end of their marriage.

== Characters with their own pages ==
The following characters also debuted between 2010 and 2019 and have their own pages:

- Oliver Jones
- Liam Spencer
- Dayzee Leigh
- Caroline Spencer
- Danielle Spencer
- Maya Avant
- Wyatt Spencer
- Shirley Spectra

== Others ==
Date(s)	Character	Actor	Circumstances
February 1–2, 2011	Minister	Brad Sanders	A wedding minister who marries Donna Logan (Jennifer Gareis) and Justin Barber (Aaron D. Spears).
May 14–16, 2013	Jesse Graves	Ricky Paull Goldin	Jesse Graves is the former boyfriend of Maya Avant. When Caroline Spencer told her uncle Bill Spencer, Jr. about her boyfriend Rick Forrester possibly breaking up with her for Maya, Bill decided to take action and had his assistant, Alison Montgomery. Alison digs up some dirt on Maya. Jesse meets with Alison, and she offers him $10,000: $5,000 for showing up and the other $5,000 to get Maya away from Rick. While at a nightclub, Jesse runs into Maya, who comes with Rick and Caroline for a club opening for Rick's DJ friend, Othello. Allison gives Jesse the other $5,000 for holding up his end of the deal and calls Bill to let him know the job is done.
June 20, 2013–August 27, 2013	Rafael	Andrés Zuno	Rafael is described as "a bit flamboyant" and is the best friend of Caroline Spencer. Zuno began taping on May 7 and debuted on June 20. Rafael is a film and television producer that Caroline Spencer, Rick Forrester's ex-girlfriend, met up with to set up Rick's current girlfriend, aspiring actress Maya Avant, and Carter Walton, who is a lawyer by trade, in a romantic Internet web series, so they fall in love, and Caroline can snag Rick back. At Rick's July 4 party, Caroline showed up with Rafael (partly trying to make Rick jealous, which did not work), and Rafael then showed Dayzee, Marcus, Rick, Maya, Thomas and Oliver the second episode. Rafael brought in a couple of guinea pigs for the next episode, but Caroline, who is afraid of rodents, pushed for a water bed. Rafael and Caroline have a fight in which he thinks Caroline does not care about his career. Rick came to the set to visit Maya and chat with Rafael, and told Caroline that he does not know what to believe.
October 16, 2013–present	Charlie Webber	Dick Christie	Charlie Webber is a security guard entrusted with protecting the blue diamond that Hope Logan and Wyatt Spencer have borrowed from one of the contacts of Quinn Fuller in Mexico (to promote the collaboration between Forrester Creations and Artisan Quinn for the line HFTF). Charlie flirts with Pamela Douglas at the boutique, later entering a romantic relationship, and they are still together. In 2018, Charlie and Pam got engaged.
September 26, 2013–August 14, 2014	Ricardo Montemayor	Victor Rivers	Ricardo Montemayor was a man who gave Wyatt Spencer and Hope Logan the Hope For The Future Diamond for their jewelry line for Forrester Creations. Wyatt received a video on his laptop right before Ricardo's death, granting him the HFTF Diamond, claiming he has no close family members or friends. Deacon Sharpe, the roommate of Wyatt's mother, Quinn Fuller, reviewed the videos, realizing Ricardo hints at having a history with Quinn using hints such as "quintessence, mother, and fuller." Deacon thought Quinn might have killed Ricardo so Wyatt could inherit the diamond, but Quinn denied it.
May 9, 2013–July 5, 2013	Theresa Corazon	Sandra Vergara	Theresa Corazon is a model for Forrester Creations. She flirts with Oliver Jones.
August 8, 2014 – January 20, 2015, July 27 – August 4, 2016, 2020–2021	Eva	Kelly Kruger	Eva is a Forrester Creations international publicist. She helps to oversee photo shoots in Paris and Amsterdam.
November 7–13, 2014	Lars	Ferry Doedens	Lars is a Forrester Creations public relations executive in Amsterdam. Wyatt Spencer asked Lars to organize a romantic boat trip for Liam Spencer and Ivy Forrester.
October 30, 2014 – June 24, 2015	Zach	Zach Rance	Zach is first seen at a Halloween beach party with his friends Caleb and Donny. As Liam Spencer and Ivy Forrester arrive at the party, Donny runs by to say hello to Liam alongside Zach and Caleb. They then started talking about the party and that there is going to be a contest for prizes. Zach receives a position at Forrester Creations working in the shipping area. He returns for some episodes when he is needed for work.
March 11–12, 2015	Diane	Jill Whelan	Diane is the group counselor who conducts an AA meeting that Brooke Logan attends when she believes she has developed a drinking problem. Deacon Sharpe also attends the meeting, and Diane invites him to speak.
May 8, 2015–August 12, 2015	Nick	Scott Turner Schofield	Nick is Maya Avant's mentor and best friend. He supports her when the press and her partner Rick Forrester learn that she is a transgender woman. He is the marriage officiant at Rick and Maya's wedding.
June 9–19, 2015	McCaffrey	Vincent Duvall	McCaffrey is a federal agent who comes to Forrester Creations to give Ivy Forrester deportation papers. He returns after learning that Ivy married Liam Spencer and tells her that he will be checking into the validity of her marriage.
June 29, 2015– 2017, 2020	Charlotte	Camelia Somers	Charlotte is an intern at Forrester Creations. Briefly involved with Thomas Forrester and then interested in Wyatt Spencer, but he rejected her because he fell in love with Katie Logan.
June 2016	Saz	Jai Rodriguez	Saz is a photographer for the Forrester's lingerie shoot.
July 3, 2015–February 2018	Vivienne Avant	Anna Maria Horsford	Vivienne and Julius are the parents of Maya Avant and Nicole Avant. While Vivienne is accepting of Maya being transgender, Julius is more critical with his comments, bordering on transphobia. Secretly, Julius has another daughter, Sasha Thompson, with his neighbor and friend Lucy.
July 9, 2015–February 2018, 2020	Julius Avant	Obba Babatundé	Vivienne and Julius are the parents of Maya Avant and Nicole Avant. While Vivienne is accepting of Maya being transgender, Julius is more critical with his comments, bordering on transphobia. Secretly, Julius has another daughter, Sasha Thompson, with his neighbor and friend Lucy.
