= Shirley Spectra =

- The Bold and the Beautiful character
- Portrayed by: Patrika Darbo
- Duration: 2017–2018; 2021; since 2026
- First appearance: February 1, 2017
- Created by: Bradley Bell and Michael Minnis
- Introduced by: Bradley Bell (2017); Anthony Morina and Josh Griffith (2021); Sally McDonald (2026)
- Crossover appearances: The Young and the Restless (2021, 2026)
In-universe information
- Occupation: Baker; Businesswoman
- Sisters: Sally Spectra
- Granddaughters: Sally Spectra; Coco Spectra
- Nephews: C. J. Garrison
- Nieces: Macy Alexander; Darla Forrester (adoptive)

Shirley Spectra is a fictional character from the American soap opera The Bold and the Beautiful, played by Patrika Darbo. The character and casting was announced on January 31, 2017, and Darbo's first appearance as Shirley aired the following day. Shirley was introduced as the previously-unknown sister of former character Sally Spectra (Darlene Conley) in a storyline which saw Shirley and her granddaughter Sally Spectra Jr (Courtney Hope) try to revive the Spectra fashions. Conley and Darbo had been trying to cast Darbo as Sally's sister for years prior to her debut. Darbo did not have to audition for the role and had to keep it a secret. The Spectra family and fashion business had not appeared regularly in years and executive producer Bradley Bell decided to bring back a new generation of the Spectras for the 30th anniversary of The Bold and the Beautiful. Bell believed that the new Spectras would act as a contrast to the other characters on the soap, who were all wealthy. The new Spectra clan was also joined by Alex Wyse as Saul Feinberg, Danube Hermosillo as Darlita, and Courtney Grosbeck as Shirley's other granddaughter, Coco Spectra. Shirley's storylines during her stint revolved around her efforts to make the new Spectra business a success and her scheming. In March 2018, it was announced that the whole new Spectra clan had been written out, and Darbo's exit aired that same month. She subsequently made a one-off return in an episode in November 2018. In 2021 and 2026, Darbo returned as Shirley on The Young and the Restless, the sister show of The Bold and the Beautiful.

== Development and casting ==
=== Introduction and conception ===
On January 31, 2017, it was announced that a new generation of the Spectra family would debut on the American soap opera The Bold and the Beautiful, after that day's episode had a "head-shaking twist" that saw a new character use the name "Sally Spectra", which had belonged to one of the soap's "matron" characters, Sally Spectra, played by Darlene Conley from 1989 to 2006. The original Spectra clan had a fashion business that rivalled the Forrester family's fashion business for years and the family were popular with viewers; however, after Conley's death in 2007, there had not been any major storylines regarding the Spectra family or fashion business. The new Sally was revealed to be the grand-niece of the original Sally, played by Courtney Hope; Sally Jr was named after her grandaunt. In addition to Hope, it was announced that Patrika Darbo would play Shirley Spectra, the sister of the original Sally and the grandmother of the new Sally; the new Spectra gang was joined by Alex Wyse as Saul Feinberg, the grandson of original Spectra worker of the same name Michael Fox and Danube Hermosillo as Darlita, intended to be the "new" original Spectra receptionist Darla Forrester (Schae Harrison). The Spectra family was later expanded with the introduction of Sally Jr's sister, Coco Spectra (Courtney Grosbeck). Darbo had teased that there could be other members of the Spectra family "waiting to come out of the swamps".

The new Spectra clan were the "fashion rivals" of the soap opera's Forrester family and fashion company, and Bradley Bell, the head writer and executive producer of The Bold and the Beautiful, decided to bring the family back for the soap's 30th anniversary. Bell explained, "I've been thinking about ways to play into our great history [ahead of the soap's anniversary]. We always need new, fresh characters that pack a punch and no one packed more punch than [the original] Sally Spectra". As most of the original Spectra cast members had left the soap or died, the soap decided to bring new characters to introduce the next generation of the family by revealing that the original Sally has a sister, Shirley. Speaking about the new cast members, Bell said, "All four have an incredible comic timing. I'm so excited about this group! We're going through some rough times in our country and our world right now. We could use some escapism and levity, and that's exactly what this new Spectra gang will provide." Bell had known Darbo for years prior to her casting and had wanted to work with her for a long time. Darbo's first appearance as Shirley aired the following day on February 1, 2017.

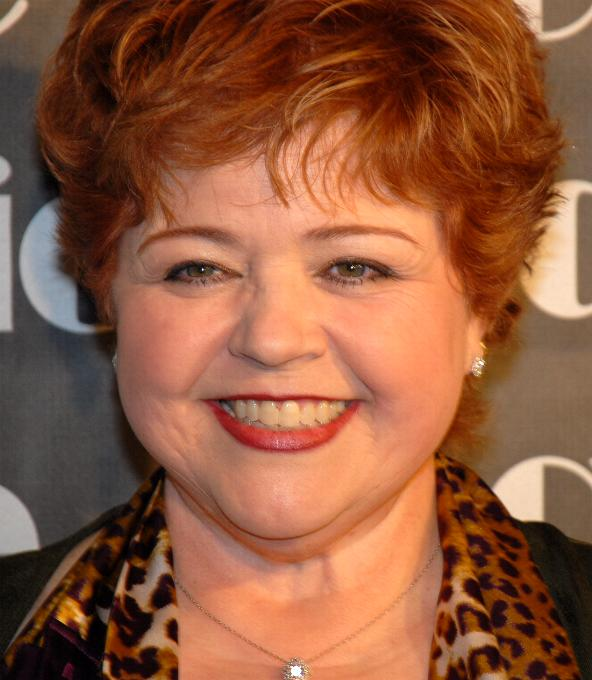
Patrika Darbo had to keep her casting on The Bold and the Beautiful a secret.

Bell believed that the new Spectra clan would act as a "marvelous contrast" to the Forrester family and company; Bell acknowledged that most of the current characters on The Bold and the Beautiful had become millionaires and were all "refined, sophisticated socialites". He teased, "The Spectras will be a much more realistic group, and they'll introduce a whole bunch of relatable issues and real drama, along with the comedy. Let's put it this way: The Foresters are champagne. Sally and her bunch are wine in a box!" Bell revealed that the new characters are desperate to go into the fashion business and their debut featured the return of Mick Cain as C. J. Garrison, the son of the original Sally. In the storyline, Bill Spencer Jr. (Don Diamont) wants to tear down the old Spectra Fashions brick warehouse and replace it with a skyscraper, but C.J., who owns the building, decides to give Sally Jr the building for six months instead, as she has the dreams of being a designer. Sally Jr is backed by the original Sally from afar; although Sally Sr's portrayer Conley had died, Bell had kept the character alive as he always believed that she was "bigger than life", and he found "some cool ways" to make her part of the new storyline. Bell teased that Shirley and her crew would "play dirty", explaining, "Young Sally wants this company to be legit but, right away, the decks are stacked against her. As with a lot of people who come to Los Angeles with lofty ambitions, reality will come crashing down". Darbo enjoyed working with Hope and Grosbeck and liked "watching them grow". Of the whole Spectra group, Darbo said that she could not ask for a better family and believed that they acted like a real family and would text each over a lot over lines.

The role of Shirley had been considered almost 20 years before her debut; Darbo revealed that she and Conley had a good relationship and that over the years, they used to joke about Darbo coming in to portray Sally's sister, although they called her "Savannah", and that Conley and Darbo would "browbeat" Brad Bell when she would see him at parties to introduce Sally's sister. Darbo was not given a lot of information regarding Shirley's backstory, but was immediately persuaded to join when Bell told her that he wanted to introduce Sally's sister; Darbo explained, "That was enough for me. I'm not sure the writers even know where this adventure is headed down the line. We basically have the family tree. Now we're slowly putting the leaves on it. The actors in this new branch of the Spectra family are so eager to do a good job. We all started at the same time with so little information but a whole lotta nerves. We're clinging to each other, terrified we'll end up in the toilet!"

"My agent called me and said, 'This is a secret so you can't say anything, but are you interested?’ I said, 'Are you kidding me? Yes! It would be a bad thing for me to say no after I badgered Brad relentlessly for nearly 20 years [laughs].'"

— Darbo on how she found out about the role (2017)

Darbo was appearing on Days of Our Lives as Nancy Wesley, a role she been portraying on and off since 1998, when she was called by her agent regarding the Shirley role. She found it difficult to keep her The Bold and the Beautiful new role secret and had to make excuses when she received offers for other projects, but she believed that it was all worth it. The actress was grateful that Bell had allowed her to finish her stint on Days of Our Lives before she began playing Shirley. Whilst appearing on The Bold and the Beautiful, Darbo was also briefly seen in a few episodes of Days of Our Lives in June 2017, due to the latter soap's advanced production schedule. Darbo did not have to audition for Shirley as she was asked to portray her, which she considered a "blessing"; this had also happened to Darbo on another soap opera, Days of Our Lives, which Darbo believed was because she was not a big mystery as it is "clear what you’re getting" if you watch some of her work or see her resume. Darbo believed that she was cast on two soap operas despite being "hardly classic soap material" as she represented a lot of the audience, explaining, "Women like me and Melissa McCarthy and Chrissy Metz are reflecting America, and we're here to stay". She added, "We're being represented now, and that is a good thing".

=== Characterisation and scheming ===
Darbo loved Shirley and described her as being the "kind of gal who'd probably hide a gun in her boobs" just in case. She also said of her characterisation, "Shirley has inherited some of [the original] Sally's ambition. She's definitely got that streak. The Spectras are survivors, and Shirley is there for her family, come hell or high water." In Shirley's backstory, she worked for years in a bakery and raised Sally Jr when Sally's parents left after getting into trouble with the authorities. Bell added that Shirley and Sally Jr both come "from nothing" and do not have much money, but are a "tough, determined team" together. Darbo believed that it was not possible to fill Conley's shoes as she was "so iconic", but hoped that she could "walk alongside her and do her proud"; she added, "There's no way I could replace her. I just have to put my pumps alongside hers as a sister would and try to maintain that character and do what the writers provide, which has been fun.". Darbo wanted to make her hair bigger to be like Conley's, but she had just cut it when she got the role; she planned to use a rattail comb to pouf her hair "all the way up to Heaven", quoting, "the bigger the hair, the closer to God!" Shirley was also affectionately known as "Grams".

Shirley and her family move to Los Angeles to revive Spectra Fashions. Shirley and Sally Jr take part in schemes to gain publicity for the new Spectra company. Early on in their stint, Shirley and Sally Jr disguise themselves as caterers at the wedding of Zende Forrester Domínguez (Rome Flynn) and Nicole Avant (Reign Edwards) so that they can find out information about the Forresters and make a "big publicity splash". Spoilers for the soap showed that Shirley was not worried about "collateral damage" as she "lays down the law" to her other granddaughter, Coco. Hope believed that Shirley was able to easily influence Sally Jr, explaining that it was Shirley's idea for Sally to steal Sally's boyfriend Thomas Forrester's (Matthew Atkinson) designs, although Sally is the one who gets the blame for it. Shirley also uses Coco to spy on the Forresters to steal designs, which she is very unhappy about. Although Sally also really regrets her actions, Shirley rants about how stealing the designs has led to Spectra Fashions getting many orders and the pair argue about Thomas, with Shirley saying that he would have broken up with Sally anyway. When Sally declares that she will not do the orders, Shirley does a speech about making Sally Sr proud by creating a viable company; she also tells Sally Jr that she should embrace being a "bottom feeder" and tells Coco that the family used her. Sally is arrested for her theft, and Shirley is there at her hearing with the judge.

=== Departure and returns ===
In March 2018, after it was announced that Hope would be leaving the soap as Sally Jr, Darbo confirmed that she would also be leaving as Shirley, as well as the rest of the new Spectra clan cast members. Darbo made her final appearance that same month. Shirley's appearances had decreased in the months leading up to her exit. Darbo believed that there was a possibility that the Spectras could return, explaining, "The audience has the power to bring us back. If Brad [Bell] finds enough audience for us, then maybe he'll find a way to find a good storyline for us. You know what? We had a wonderful year. He wrote great stuff for us. The show’s been around for a long time, a lot of people come and go, so we could come and go too. It's always good to know you have a place to go back to at some place and time." Darbo also expressed appreciation about appearing on soap operas and credited them for being good training spaces for actors, and she believed that Grosbeck and Hope had successful careers looming. On October 30, 2018, it was reported that Darbo would make a brief one-off return as Shirley on The Bold and the Beautiful the following month; the episode saw Shirley attend the Forrester fashion show, which features Sally Jr's lingerie designs.

"[Shirley's] a bitch. Basically Sally and her grandmother are schemers and manipulators. As far as they're concerned, if you allow yourself to be manipulated by them, then too bad. Shirley wants to make sure that Sally is well taken care of, but she's also, 'What's in it for me?' Shirley was once living pretty well on B&B but now she's stuck at a bakery in Texas and doesn't want to stay there. Shirley values who her granddaughter is and wants to make sure that Sally is always taken care of."

— Darbo on Shirley's characterisation (2021)

Darbo subsequently made some brief appearances as Shirley in 2021 on The Young and the Restless, the sister show of The Bold and the Beautiful. The scenes in the episodes showed Shirley speaking to Sally Jr via video call. Darko was grateful for this opportunity, explaining, "I've always been my big size, I never thought of myself as a soap opera person. To be invited first in 'Days of Our Lives,' and then 'The Bold and The Beautiful' and then, 'The Young and The Restless' has been really great, especially to be welcomed by all my fellow performers. That is a wonderful thing and I am so grateful." Darbo initially believed that she was unlikely to reprise the role of Shirley as Hope had finished on The Bold and The Beautiful and gone onto The Young and The Restless, but she had hoped that she and Hope could work together again "if the stars aligned"; the producers of The Young and The Restless then contacted Darbo's people with a "great little idea" about Shirley's return. Darbo did not have to go into the studio to film her return, and her publicist was able to record what was needed to be in the soap. Darbo was thrilled to be part of the storyline but was unsure how often she would appear as she had not been given further scripts afterwards; she also said that she would be willing to come to the studio to film in-person appearances, explaining, "I'd be there in a heartbeat. I'm an actor and I want to act. I already know the character, and the fact that I've been welcomed back even in this way is heaven-sent [...] I think strong women in soaps is a wonderful message to the women in the audience". Darbo was already good friends with The Young and the Restless actors Christian LeBlanc (Michael Baldwin) and Kate Linder (Esther Valentine).

In 2026, when asked in an interview if she would be willing to return to the role, Darbo replied, "Every actor wants to work, but I love going back there. And I think that Shirley Spectra could come back and really shake some things up at Forrester and with Bill, Dollar Bill, because he was a stinker, a real stinker. And I think she should come back and really wreak havoc." In September of that same year, it was announced Darbo was reprising the role on The Young and the Restless. Shirley returned during the October 19 episode.

== Storylines ==
Shirley is the previously unknown younger sister of Sally Spectra (Darlene Conley) and she spend her life working in a bakery. Shirley becomes the guardians of her granddaughters and Coco Spectra (Courtney Grosbeck) after their parents run away get into trouble with the authorities. Over the years, she tries to encourage Sally Jr's passion for design and initially is not keen on reviving the Spectra business, but she changes her mind when she sees how determined Sally is and she sells her business to invest in Spectra. Shirley takes control of staffing duties and encourages Saul Feinberg (Alex Wyse), the grandson of original Spectra worker Saul Feinberg Michael Fox, into taking a position at Spectra. Shirley helps Sally fuel a one-sided feud with Steffy Forrester (Jacqueline MacInnes Wood) to bolster Sally's online presence and she and Sally disguise themselves as caterers at the wedding of Zende Forrester Domínguez (Rome Flynn) and Nicole Avant (Reign Edwards) in order to find out more about the Forresters, the Spectras' fashion rivals.

When Sally's designs get a poor review, Shirley goes to desperate measures and puts a camera in Coco's necklace to access Forrester's new designs as Coco had recently been hired there. Shirley is unhappy with Sally regarding her romance with Steffy's brother, Thomas Forrester (Pierson Fodé), and tries to convince Sally to break things off. Coco is devastated when she find out that Shirley used her for espionage and Sally is unhappy with Shirley too. Things for Spectra eventually get better, with Thomas giving the company $100,000 and joining as a full-time designer, however things get worse when Thomas leaves due to the scheming of Bill Spencer Jr. (Don Diamont). Shirley is worried and angry with Bill when the Spectra building is levelled with Sally inside, although she survives. Shirley and the Spectra clan join the Forresters and Spencers at Thanksgiving dinner. Shirley later moves to New York but visits Sally when her lingerie designs are featured in a Forrester fashion show.

== Reception ==
Michael Logan from TV Insider called Shirley "down-and-out" and he believed that the Spectras were "connivers"; he wrote of their arrival, "Prepare for gang warfare!" Donald from Canyon News called the storyline regarding the Spectra clan return "juicy" and believed that Shirley may be "one of the kookiest characters in quite some time". He opined that Shirley and her granddaughter made a "hilarious couple" and praised that the rivalry between the Forrester and Spectra companies had been reignited. He also wrote that the Sally and Shirley were "not afraid to wrestle with the pigs to climb to the top". Hope Campbell from The List called Sally a "flamboyant redheaded fashion maven" that Darbo brought "to life". Campbell's colleague, Bernice Emanuel, believed that Shirley was a "bad girl" and that she was influential for Sally Jr. Jamey Giddens from Daytime Confidential called Shirley's scheme to have Coco intern at Forrester and spy on them a "Sally 1.0-inspired plot".

Discussing the news of the Spectra group leaving in 2018, Tiffany Raiford from TV Overmind believed that whilst viewers of the soap were sad to see Hope leave as Sally Jr, they were not surprised that the rest of the group would also be departing. She also wrote of the family, "They've been on the show for a year now, and they've made some friends and some good memories. There is always a chance they might come back, of course. And we do believe that the exit of all of them says that Sally might be moving her business over to New York. She's taking them all with her. It's the best way to get rid of that many people all at once unless the show is going to send them out in a major explosion of death. They could all die in an accident of some sort, but it's more fun to think that they might all be back at some point. So will we see them again? We don't know, but it could happen if they decide to make this a successful business venture for Sally in a different location. Might this happen? We don't know, but we know this is an entire business and cast of characters people will miss when they leave — and they are out pretty soon, too." Raiford also reported that viewers were speculating that Darbo would return to Days of Our Lives following the end of her stint on The Bold and the Beautiful. Garren Waldo from Soap Hub believed that Shirley had been "so eclipsed by the shadow of her more theatrically inclined sister" that no one knew she existed until 2017. He also acknowledged that life had not been generous to Shirley and wondered whether she would return in 2020, when it appeared that Sally Jr had a fatal illness.
