= Liam Spencer (The Bold and the Beautiful) =

- The Bold and the Beautiful character
- Portrayed by: Scott Clifton
- Duration: 2010–present
- First appearance: July 19, 2010
- Created by: Bradley Bell and Kay Alden
- Introduced by: Bradley Bell
- Book appearances: Forbidden Affair (2013); Second Chances (2014)
In-universe information
- Other names: Liam Cooper; William Spencer III; Adam (2016)
- Occupation: Businessman; Computer technician
- Family: Spencer
- Parents: Bill Spencer Jr.; Kelly Hopkins
- Siblings: Wyatt Spencer; Will Spencer
- Spouse: Steffy Forrester (2011–2012, 2013, 2017–2018); Hope Logan (2012, 2018–2019, 2020–2023, 2025–present); Ivy Forrester (2015)
- Children: Kelly Spencer; Beth Spencer
- Grandparents: Bill Spencer
- Aunts and uncles: Caroline Spencer Forrester; Karen Spencer
- First cousins: Caroline Spencer

Liam Spencer is a fictional character The Bold and the Beautiful, an American soap opera on the CBS network, played by Scott Clifton. He made his first appearance during the episode broadcast on July 19, 2010. Introduced as the long-lost son of media mogul Bill Spencer Jr., he is recognized for his long and complicated love triangle with Hope Logan and Steffy Forrester.

Clifton's performance in the role has been met with a favorable reception from audiences and critics, earning him the Daytime Emmy Award for Outstanding Younger Actor in a Drama Series in 2011. He won the Outstanding Supporting Actor in a Drama Series award in 2013, followed by nominations in 2014 and 2015. In 2017, he won Outstanding Lead Actor in a Drama Series, with further nominations in 2024 and 2026.

== Creation and casting ==
On May 21, 2010, Dan J Kroll from Soapcentral.com reported that actor Scott Clifton had joined the cast of The Bold and the Beautiful in the newly created role of Liam Cooper. Clifton was cast two months after leaving rival soap opera One Life to Live. The actor was initially unaware of who the character was when he auditioned for the role. On his first day on set, Clifton was told that his character would be called Liam. He then met with the executive producer Bradley Bell, who told him about Liam's backstory and that he would be Bill Spencer Jr.'s (Don Diamont) long-lost son, which is why they decided to name him Liam, short for William. Clifton kept the information to himself, until it was revealed in the scripts. He filmed his first scenes on May 25, and made his screen debut as Liam on July 19, 2010.

== Development ==
Scott Clifton's job on The Bold and the Beautiful included withholding the secret of his character's paternity. Liam Cooper's introduction to viewers began with his quest to discover the true identity of his biological father, which potentially included several lead characters. Asked by the director if he wished to know the secret, or learn the truth when Liam does, Clifton agreed to hear the truth immediately. He withheld his knowledge from cast-mates and backstage crew for several months as the storyline played out.

At times, Clifton regretted that his character would not be the son of certain fathers. "Winsor [Harmon] played those scenes so subtly and sweetly, that even though I knew what was going to happen, I was watching Winsor thinking 'God, I wish I were his son.'" Yet, Clifton has praised the storyline and defended the choice of who ultimately became Liam's father, Bill Spencer Jr., portrayed by Don Diamont. The fictional father/son duo have consistently clashed, which has led to greater storytelling potential.

An early plot hole was revealed to Clifton by fans of the show. Early on, Liam learns of the Forrester family after arriving in Los Angeles. But later it was revealed that he believed one of the Forresters could be his father even before he moved.

Of the character's unrevealed history, Clifton knows little. His interpretation of the character is that he is from the Midwest. He also believes that, while Liam's mother is dead, he has a living stepfather, who has yet to be introduced.

== Storylines ==
After the death of his mother, Liam relocates to Los Angeles to find his biological father. His only clue is that his father worked at the prestigious fashion house Forrester Creations. Liam finds employment as a computer technician at Spencer Publications. Liam later reveals that he could be Ridge Forrester's (Ronn Moss) son. Hope Logan (Kim Matula) takes pity on Liam and they become friends. Both Bill Spencer Jr. (Don Diamont) and Thorne Forrester (Winsor Harmon) are revealed to have dated Kelly and could be Liam's father. While they wait for DNA results, Liam and Thorne form a bond. Liam learns Bill is his father and with Hope and Katie Logan's (Heather Tom) encouragement, they start to bond. Hope and Liam begin dating. Amber Moore (Adrienne Frantz) convinces Liam that they had sex and she is carrying his child. It soon emerges that Amber's mother, Tawny (Andrea Evans), faked the paternity test

Liam proposes to Hope. Hope asks Liam to wait before they are married to consummate their relationship because of her clothing line. Hope ends the engagement. Liam and Steffy marry, but their marriage is opposed by Katie and Brooke Logan (Katherine Kelly Lang). While on vacation in Cabo, Liam finds that Hope is there with Thomas Forrester (Adam Gregory). He realizes that Steffy knew they were there and did not tell him. Liam goes after Hope, who is riding an ATV with Thomas. After catching up to them, Liam kisses Hope. They then find Steffy unconscious, having crashed her own ATV. Liam initially decides to stand by Steffy when he learns she has a blood clot in her brain, but he reunites with Hope after learning Bill switched MRI results. Liam ends his marriage to Steffy, but she refuses to sign the annulment papers.

While Liam, Hope, and Steffy are skiing in Aspen, Hope, who is under the influence of anti-anxiety medication, collides with Steffy. She apologizes and continues down the mountain even though Steffy is injured. Liam finds Steffy and goes with her to the hospital. Liam confronts Hope about the collision. He becomes concerned about Hope, but she tells Liam to go back to Steffy at the hospital. Steffy gives Liam the signed annulment papers, but Liam rips them up and they kiss. Bill urges Liam to break up with Hope. Brooke learns Liam ripped up the papers, but he asks her to keep it to herself. Liam and Hope go to Italy to marry, but Hope is late to the ceremony, causing Liam to think that she has walked out on him. Liam asks Steffy to marry him again, but Hope tells Liam her father, Deacon Sharpe (Sean Kanan), made her late and they finally marry. They later learn that their marriage is not valid in the United States.

When Hope discovers Liam kissed Steffy on their wedding day, she refuses to have their marriage validated and insists on a second wedding. She ends their relationship when Liam arrives to the ceremony drunk on the back of motorcycle.

Liam and Steffy get back together, and she becomes pregnant. Steffy suffers a miscarriage after an accident while riding her motorcycle and moves to Paris. Liam resumes his romance with Hope. Liam's older half-brother, Wyatt Fuller (Darin Brooks), begins working for Hope for the Future (HFTF) and competes with Liam for Hope. Wyatt's mother, Quinn (Rena Sofer), starts interfering, and Steffy returns to win Liam back.

When Hope sees Liam and Steffy together, she goes to Hawaii with Wyatt, unaware that Liam chose her. Liam tells Hope the truth, but she stays with Wyatt. Liam discovers Wyatt was behind a diamond heist at HFTF, and exposes him, but Wyatt is given another chance since the heist gave Forrester more publicity.

Liam tells Hope to date both him and Wyatt and then choose between them. When Hope learns that Quinn was partially responsible for Ridge's disappearance, she breaks up with Wyatt and accepts Liam's proposal. Quinn tries to harm Liam, and Wyatt helps save him. Their relationship improves, and Liam and Hope give Wyatt his job back.

Liam befriends the newly arrived Ivy Forrester (Ashleigh Brewer).

Wyatt is left the HFTF diamond by Ricardo Montemayor and he gifts it to Hope. Liam asks Hope to return the diamond, but when Wyatt sets up a press conference and publicly gifts the diamond to Hope, she accepts it. Wyatt and Rick take the diamond on a promotion tour, starting in Paris. Hope invites Liam to meet her there and marry her. Ivy and Aly (Ashlyn Pearce) convince Liam to meet Hope. When Ivy falls into the Seine, Liam jumps in to save her and misses his meeting with Hope. Bill tells Liam that Hope married Wyatt. Liam tells Hope the truth about being in Paris, but she does not leave Wyatt. Ivy and Liam kiss, but he still has feelings for Hope.

When Liam learns Quinn followed him and Ivy to Paris, and pushed Ivy in the Seine, he tells Hope and asks her to leave Wyatt. She refuses as she is pregnant. Liam and Ivy's relationship progresses. Hope suffers a miscarriage and leaves for Italy, after saying goodbye to Liam.

Liam eventually breaks up with Ivy, before getting back together, and breaking up again. Liam resigns from Forrester Creations and as he is about to leave, he is confronted by Quinn and passes out in front of her due to a prior injury. Quinn takes Liam to a cabin to take care of him only for Liam to wake up with no memory. Over time Liam and Quinn end up loving each other while Liam is under the impression Quinn is his wife named "Eve" and his name is "Adam." Eventually, Liam's memory is triggered by Wyatt, who is now married to Steffy.

Liam tries to regain his relationship with Steffy after getting his memory back, but she stays married to Wyatt. Eventually her marriage to Wyatt breaks down because of Quinn marrying Eric, and she rekindles her love and relationship with Liam. Liam proposes to her and she accepts, with the two getting married in Sydney, Australia.

Liam kisses Sally Spectra (Courtney Hope) when they are trapped in a burning building, and an upset Steffy has sex with Bill. Steffy reveals that she is pregnant, but Liam breaks up with when he finds out about her fling with his father due to finding a paternity test she took. Liam reconnects with Hope (now Annika Noelle). Liam plans to marry her when he believes that Steffy is having an affair with Bill, but the wedding does not go ahead when he realizes it is not true. Steffy gives birth to Liam's daughter, who they call Kelly Spencer, and Liam finds out that Hope is pregnant with his baby. Liam marries Hope and starts a new life with her, but Hope has their marriage annulled when their baby Beth is believed to have died.

Hope then marries Thomas to raise Douglas with him. Hope eventually gets back together with Liam after they find out Beth is still alive and that Thomas withheld the information for several months. Thomas goes into hiding and Hope pursues an annulment of their marriage. After resolving all problems, Hope and Liam finally get married again. Not long after, Liam believes he has seen Hope kissing Thomas and he has sex with Steffy, who becomes pregnant. Hope is heartbroken, and she leaves Liam. It comes to light that John Finnegan's (Tanner Novlan) is the father although Vinny Walker (Joe LoCicero) tries to alter the results of the paternity test. Hope tries to forgive Liam for his mistake.

One evening, Liam and Bill, who has had too much to drink, drive home, and hit Vinny with their car. He succumbs to his injuries. Liam faints, and Bill cleans up the crime scene and puts Liam back in the car and drives him home even though he has had too much to drink.

Liam and Hope get back together, and he tells her the truth about what happened to Vinny because his feels guilty. Hope initially thinks Liam should tell the police, but they are both afraid of losing each other and having the children grow up without a father. Bill tries to convince them to keep it a secret, but Liam makes a confession to the police. Liam is then released when it is revealed that Vinny committed suicide.

Liam and Hope remain married raising Beth.

== Reception ==
For his portrayal of Liam, Clifton won the Outstanding Younger Actor in a Drama Series accolade at the 38th Daytime Emmy Awards in 2011. At the 40th Daytime Emmy Awards in 2013, Clifton won the Outstanding Supporting Actor in a Drama Series, along with actor Billy Miller from The Young and the Restless. Clifton was nominated in the same category at the 41st and 42nd Daytime Emmy Awards in 2014 and 2015 respectively. In 2017, Clifton won the Outstanding Lead Actor in a Drama Series at the 44th Daytime Emmy Awards.

During a feature on what storylines were working and not working for the show, a Soap World reporter quipped, "apologies to Team Liam fans, but he's such a wimp who wants to possess Hope despite his endlessly grating protestations of love for her. Quinn's right, he's a boy, not a man!" Helen Vnuk of TV Week included Liam in her feature on soap heroes, and she stated, "Ok, so Liam didn't save Ivy from an inferno or psycho killer. But, he did generously agree to marry her when she said she faced being deported to Australia. Any American who helps out an Aussie in trouble is a hero to us!" In 2017, Donald from Canyon News wrote that he was "super sick" of the love triangle between Hope, Steffy and Liam, and added, "Liam is such a self-righteous character! Every soap opera has one of them, and they are so ANNOYING!"

In 2022, Charlie Mason from Soaps She Knows placed Liam at #8 on his ranked list of The Bold and the Beautiful’s Best of the Best Characters Ever, commenting that "Despite his (well-earned) reputation as a waffler, we couldn't love Scott Clifton's character any more than he does Hope. Or Steffy. Then Hope again. Then Steffy. And that once, Ivy. But mostly Hope. And Steffy..."
