= Wyatt Spencer =

- The Bold and the Beautiful character
- Portrayed by: Darin Brooks
- Duration: 2013–2024, 2026
- First appearance: June 21, 2013
- Created by: Bradley Bell
- Introduced by: Bradley Bell (2013); Anthony Morina and Josh Griffith (2021); Casey Kasprzyk (2026)
- Crossover appearances: The Young and the Restless
In-universe information
- Other names: Wyatt Fuller
- Occupation: Jewelry designer Businessman
- Parents: Bill Spencer, Jr. Quinn Fuller
- Stepparents: Katie Logan
- Siblings: Liam Spencer; Will Spencer
- Spouse: Hope Logan (2014–2015); Steffy Forrester (2016–2017)
- Grandparents: Bill Spencer
- Aunts and uncles: Caroline Spencer Forrester; Karen Spencer
- Nieces and nephews: Kelly Spencer; Beth Spencer
- First cousins: Caroline Spencer

Wyatt Spencer is a fictional character from The Bold and the Beautiful, an American soap opera on the CBS network. Created by head writer Bradley Bell, the character is portrayed by Darin Brooks, who made his first appearance in June 2013. He exited the role in January 2024 when Wyatt left town. Brooks reprised the role when Wyatt returned to Los Angeles in May 2026.

Wyatt is introduced as the previously-unknown eldest son of media mogul Bill Spencer, Jr. (Don Diamont) and Quinn Fuller (Rena Sofer). In addition to expanding the Spencer family, Wyatt immediately becomes a rival to his half-brother, Liam Spencer (Scott Clifton), for their father's affections and the affections of Liam's longtime love, Hope Logan (Kim Matula). Wyatt is raised by his single mother, Quinn, and becomes accustomed to doing anything to survive. However, it is his relationship with Hope that helps him change for the better. Despite Wyatt trying to live the best life he can, those around him, specifically Liam, consistently throw his past in his face and accuse him of being bad for Hope and bad for businesses. Wyatt and Liam's rivalry continues when he gets involved with Liam's exes, Ivy Forrester (Ashleigh Brewer) and Steffy Forrester (Jacqueline MacInnes Wood), and he also gets involved with his father's ex-wife, Katie Logan (Heather Tom).

Brooks' performance has been met with critical acclaim, having garnered him a Daytime Emmy Award nomination for Outstanding Supporting Actor in a Drama Series in 2021.

== Creation ==
=== Casting ===
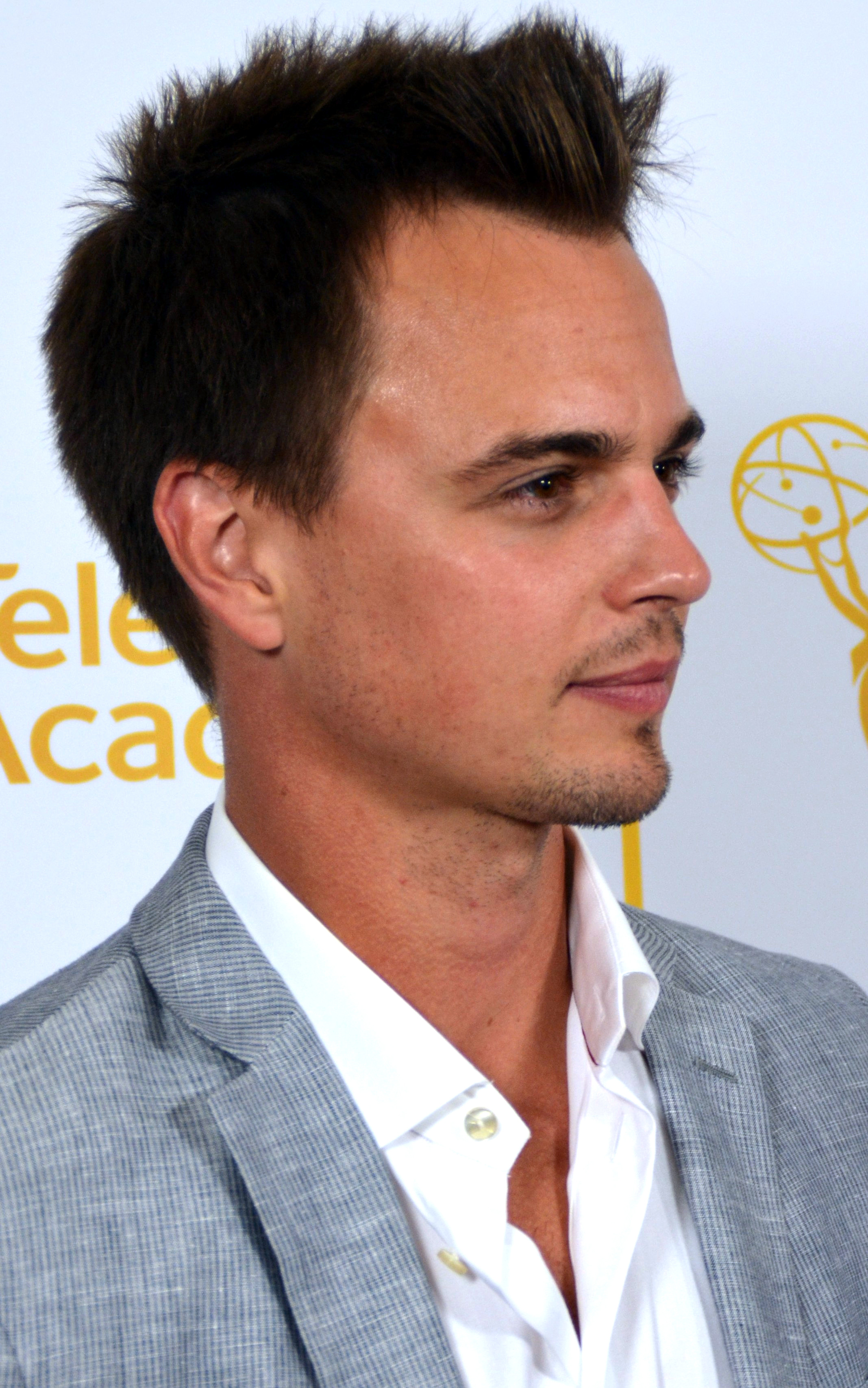
Darin Brooks' casting was announced in May 2013.

On May 15, 2013, Michael Logan of TV Guide exclusively announced that Darin Brooks, known for his Emmy winning portrayal of Max Brady on Days of Our Lives had joined the cast in the newly created role of Wyatt. Brooks filmed his first scenes on May 8, 2013, with his first airdate slated for June 21. Ironically, Brooks's first airdate coincided with the anniversary of his first appearance on Days of our Lives. Brooks revealed told Soap Opera Digest about how he got the job. "It happened super-quick," said Brooks of his casting. He continued, "On Monday, my manager called and said, 'We've got a chemistry test for BOLD.' On Wednesday, I went in, met people; it was great. They called afterward and asked me to come back on Friday to chemistry read with somebody else. I went in and did that, and by about noon on Friday, they were like, 'Okay, let's do this." Brooks also revealed that he was in talks to reprise his role of Max on Days of our Lives but said, "the timing just didn't work out." However, when it comes to Bold, Brooks said, "The opportunity presented itself." Brooks also met with executive producer, Brad Bell before, and previously worked with supervising producer, Ed Scott during his tenure at Days. Brooks tested opposite Kim Matula who played Hope, for his first chemistry read. The second test was with Scott Clifton, who played Liam.

In January 2021, a crossover event between The Bold and the Beautiful and The Young and the Restless was announced involving Brooks’ character along with the character of Flo Fulton and Y&R character of Summer Newman. Brooks’ appearances occurred on January 12 and 15 of the same year.

In October 2023, after ten years on canvas, Brooks announced his exit from the soap; he initially made his final appearance in September 2023. Several months later, Brooks taped his last scenes, which were then aired on the January 17 and 19, 2024, episodes during which Wyatt announced his departure from Los Angeles. In February 2026, Brooks revealed he was open to reprising the role if the opportunity presented itself.

In February 2026, Brooks teased a potential return to the role, following talks with Bell at the serial's new studio at Sunset Las Palmas Studios. He revealed: "The door is always open on my end." That May, it was revealed that Brooks would reprise the role, with Wyatt's return beginning on May 27.

=== Characterization ===
"With Hope, he's that nice guy, the boy next door, but he's also a little bit dangerous, a little scary."

— Brooks on Wyatt's appeal.

A representative for the series described Wyatt as "clever and mysterious." Wyatt is the kind of man "who will stand up for himself" Brooks revealed. "He's a badass" Brooks stated to TV Guide. "He's a take-charge, powerful kind of guy," Brooks said of the character in an interview with CBS Soaps In Depth. "He's strong, he stubborn, and he's ready for anything," Brooks continued. Brooks also described Wyatt as a "charmer." According to Brooks, it is Wyatt's charming personality that makes his such a good business man. However, Wyatt's has a "dangerous charm." In an interview with On-Air On-Soaps, Brooks said, " Wyatt is the type of guy who goes after what he feels, and he doesn’t care!" In this way, he is very much like his father, Bill Spencer (Don Diamont). Wyatt has that "bad boy-ness" in him. According to Brooks, Wyatt can also be a "nice good-natured guy." When compared to the heroic Max on Days, Brooks described Wyatt as being "more of a playboy." Wyatt is a very "strong stubborn character," and he is willing to "take on any challenge -- or he'll at least try to." Brooks compared the character to many of Jack Nicholson's role where he plays a villain, but "he's so likeable. You hate him, but you love him."

== Development ==
=== Introduction ===
The character's introduction came on the heels of the announcement that Jacqueline MacInnes Wood, who played Steffy Forrester had decided not to renew her contract and would depart from the series (she later agreed to sign on recurringly). Wood's departure would take away from the show's major romantic triangle featuring the characters of Hope (Kim Matula), Liam (Scott Clifton) and Steffy. Brooks had quite a few meetings with Brad Bell before he booked the role of Wyatt which led the actor to believe that the producers were trying to figure out "how and where" to fit the character into the canvas. Bell told Brooks that they would figure out the character as the storyline unfolded. Brooks himself suggested that Wyatt be a bit of "bad boy," and Bell "took it and ran with it." Bell crafted a back-story for the character and presented it to Brooks. Brooks said of the character's introduction, "We are sort of piecing it all together as it is unraveling." "As the story unfolds, he moves into that whole fashion-industry world and you'll find out his connection to everything" Brooks said to Michael Logan.

=== Paternity reveal ===
"When Wyatt found out about that he has a father, everything sort of came crashing down on him at that moment. He has been told all these lies, and it can really put your mind in a tailspin, and then you find out you have a brother, and all these families’ members, and this hidden life that has been kept from you. So he is angry, and he wants to know why? Then he finds out that Bill had given Quinn money for the abortion, and that hurts, too."

— Brooks on Wyatt's reaction to his paternity revelation.

Just five days after it was announced that Brooks had joined the cast, it was also announced that Rena Sofer, known for her portrayal of Lois Cerullo on General Hospital was cast in the role of Wyatt's mother, Quinn Fuller. According to Brooks, Wyatt's world is "rocked" by the revelation of his paternity. At the time, Wyatt has just "poured his heart and soul into pursuing Hope," only for her to reject him for Liam. What hurts the most is that Quinn lied to him about his father. Wyatt views the situation as "We've been struggling as hard as we can to get our jewelry business off the ground and you've been keeping a billionaire from my life? This is crazy!" He sees the revelation as a potentially good thing. However, when Wyatt learns that Bill gave Quinn money to get an abortion, "He's torn between his lying mother and a father who didn't want him in the first place." Had these secrets come out over a period of time, Wyatt may have been able to take them in stride, but because everything comes out at once, Wyatt is left feeling like, "Nobody wants me. My parents are heartless liars. I'm related to a wishy-washy guy, and my girl doesn't want me." Though Wyatt initially comes off as a nice guy, Wyatt's reaction to being Bill's son "keeps people guessing what is he going to do next?" Though Wyatt is able to overlook Bill not wanting him, he clashes with Bill again when after learning he has "abandoned" his youngest son Will with estranged wife, Katie Logan (Heather Tom). According to Brooks, "Wyatt is disappointed to see his new family already coming apart." Wyatt may have gotten "overly excited" about the idea of a family. And because he sees so much of himself in Bill, it scares him to see what Bill is doing to his other family. Though Bill puts distance between himself and his son for Wyatt's judgement. Of the storyline, Brooks said that Wyatt experiences so many emotions that he doesn't know how to react "so he is lashing out." Brooks said, " Wyatt has always wanted love from his father, and he feels after all this lost time, he wants to prove himself and be loved."

=== Feud with Liam and romantic triangle ===
Wyatt immediately becomes a rival for his brother, Liam Spencer (Scott Clifton) for the affections of Hope Logan (Kim Matula). Brooks said Wyatt's introduction sends Liam "reeling with the realization that Hope's heart, may not, in fact, be perpetually on hold for him!" Wyatt does not shy away from the challenge of battling Liam for Hope's affection. Of Wyatt's competitive nature with his brother Liam, Brooks said, "[Wyatt] has always wanted a love from a brother, but he finds it fun competition for him right now in trying to get the girl! So it’s kind of power and love at the same time." According to Brooks, challenging Liam is Wyatt's attempt at testing the "boundaries" to "see if Liam is a worthy adversary." Wyatt relishes in "getting under Liam's skin," Brooks said of Wyatt convincing Hope to accompany him to Mexico. Besides Hope, Bill seeing so much of himself in Wyatt, also causes tension between the brothers. While Bill considers some of Liam's behavior to be "un-Spencer like," but when he meets Wyatt, according to Don Diamont, Bill thinks, "Hey, look at this kid, he's great! Built in my own image!" Hope and Wyatt's business relationship serves as a catalyst to advance their personal relationship and Liam is very much threatened. Wyatt enjoys to pulling Liam's strings and "[giving] him a run for his money." According to Brooks, Wyatt continues "turning the knife," in an effort to get a reaction from Liam. Brooks said that there would always be "some kind of sibling rivalry between [Wyatt and Liam] and fighting for someone's affection, whether it's their dad's affection or Hope's affection." Though they are both generally nice guys, Liam's at times comes off as a pushover and "Wyatt's hoping that [Liam] does step up to make it a challenge." With tensions high after the paternity revelation, Wyatt thinks he can help Liam by showing him some "tough love" and forcing him to be a "stronger person." In a joint interview with Soap Opera Digest, Brooks and Clifton discussed Wyatt and Liam's dynamic as the feuding brothers. According to Brooks, regardless of any kind of "animosity and jealousy" between the brothers, there is an "underlying love that anybody would have if they were an only sibling and now they have somebody." When asked to describe the relationship, Clifton said jokingly, "Liam no like Wyatt." He continued, "I would say layered, dialectical, and in some ways paradoxical." Brooks said, "Obviously competitive, jealous, but there's also a huge need for a brother's love that they've never had, for both of them."

=== Relationship with Hope ===
Wyatt is immediately "smitten" with Hope explained Brooks. Wyatt has no problem challenging Liam for Hope's affections nor is he put off by her complicated romantic past. Hope initially rejects Wyatt's advances because she is engaged to Liam, but she enjoys the fact that he only has eyes for her, while Liam is consistently torn between her and her stepsister, Steffy Forrester. Later, Kim Matula commented that Hope is "super intrigued by this Wyatt guy," so the moment she finds an out with Liam, she takes it. The partnership between Forrester Creations and Quinn Artisan forces the duo to spend more time together and allows them to get closer. According to Brooks, Wyatt legitimately adores Hope. The actor revealed that he intentionally tried to portray the best in Wyatt when he is with Hope. Hope is the only person besides his mother that Wyatt seems to be completely "genuine" with. Despite claiming he doesn't have an ulterior motive, Wyatt views their business trip to Mexico to see the Hope Diamond as his chance to finally win Hope's affections. The diamond is a "Romancing the Stone-type of thing, where [Hope and Wyatt] go off to a foreign land in search of this diamond. It's sexy and it's Latin and it's great," Brooks said of the duo's Mexican adventure.

=== Reintroduction (2026) ===
On May 22, 2026, it was announced that Brooks would reprise the role of Wyatt after a two-year absence. He revealed his return stemmed from February 2026 talks with Bell, revealing, "[W]e went up to Brad's office, and he shut the door, and he was like, 'Do you want to come back? ... You're obviously loved here, and we would love to have some comedy on the show again.' We had a couple more discussions, and then it took shape from there." Brooks revealed Wyatt's return comes after Bill "forces him" to return to town and that questions concerning Wyatt's relationship status would be answered but did not divulge specific details.

== Storylines ==
Hope sees the mysterious Wyatt taking a solar shower and takes his picture. However, he catches her, and a chase ensues which leads to her falling and hitting her head. Wyatt is immediately taken with Hope even going so far as to kiss her to wake her up. Wyatt finds Hope's cell phone and returns it to her in Los Angeles where she invites him to accompany her to a 4 July party. Hope's estranged ex, Liam Spencer (Scott Clifton) is unsettled when he finds them together at the party. They share another kiss as Hope spots his sword necklace, which is identical to Liam and his father, Bill (Don Diamont)'s. Thanks to Hope's machinations, Wyatt discovers that Bill is his long lost father and that his mother, Quinn (Rena Sofer) actually designed the original sword necklace. Angry about Quinn's lies, Wyatt moves in with Liam and Bill. However, Wyatt continues pursuing Hope and kisses her again which leads to Liam hitting him.

Liam wants to put Wyatt out of the house, but Bill convinces them to try and work through their differences. But when Wyatt berates Bill about abandoning his wife, Katie (Heather Tom) and youngest son, Will, after his affair with Katie's sister and Hope's mother, Brooke Logan (Katherine Kelly Lang), Bill disowns Wyatt anyway. Wyatt reconciles with Quinn and moves back in with her. Brooke explains the extenuating circumstances allowing Wyatt to soften toward Bill and has Bill see the situation from Wyatt's perspective. Caroline tells Bill he's treating Wyatt the same way Bill Spencer Sr. treated Bill. Bill eventually accepts Wyatt again and they start to establish a father-son relationship. Hope decides to use Quinn Artisan as the jewelry designer to tie to her fashion line, Hope For the Future and Wyatt continues pursuing Hope. Liam feels threatened and tries to convince Hope to cancel the deal, but Hope decides against it. In October 2013 at Quinn's encouragement, Wyatt takes Hope to Mexico to see the Hope Diamond as he plans to integrate the diamond into the jewelry line. Wyatt tries to get Hope to leave Liam, and be with him, but she refuses. Hope calls off her engagement to Liam after she receives an e-mail with Liam's romantic video of his life with Steffy. Quinn admits to sending the video, and Wyatt eventually comes clean about his mother's interference, and she forgives him for keeping the secret. To impress Hope, Wyatt stages a jewelry heist and manages to disarm actual jewel thieves. Liam convinces Hope that they should get married and pressures her into severing all ties with Wyatt. Abiding by Hope's wishes, Wyatt says goodbye to Hope on her the day of her wedding to Liam as he plans to go to Hawaii. He is however shocked when Hope leaves Liam at the altar after seeing him with Steffy again and travels to Hawaii with him. Liam follows soon after and reveals that Quinn set them up and convinced Steffy to return from Paris after finding out that she can now conceive again but Hope decided to start a relationship with Wyatt putting Liam in her past. However, their happiness is short lived when Liam reveals that Wyatt took the Hope Diamond and it almost ends their relationship, but Hope forgave Wyatt, and they reunite.

Hope then has a pregnancy scare and after months of exclusively dating Wyatt, Liam persuaded Hope to share equal time and make a final decision on who she wants to be with. Wyatt reluctantly agrees. When Ridge goes missing in Abu Dhabi, everyone starts blaming Quinn for it because she sends Ridge a selfie email of her and Bill. During a heated argument between Liam and Quinn at Forrester, he calls her a manipulative bitch, Wyatt enters and punches Liam for calling his mother that. Hope realises what happened and becomes upset at Wyatt for punching Liam and leaves with Liam. She feels guilty for bringing Quinn and Wyatt into the company, so she chooses to be with Liam, and they kiss. Liam later proposes to Hope, who accepts. Wyatt and Quinn are fired, but later Deacon and Wyatt learn of Quinn's plan to murder Liam. Wyatt saves his brother, and Quinn decides to check herself into a mental health facility, while Liam decides not to press charges. Liam and Wyatt decide to have a brotherly relationship, and at his urging, Hope rehires Wyatt, who will be working with the newly arrived Ivy Forrester. But then, Wyatt learns Ricardo Montemayor died and willed the Hope for the Future Diamond to him. Shocked but saddened by Ricardo's demise, Wyatt uses this opportunity to win Hope back by gifting her with the diamond. He then throws a big press conference, announcing Ricardo's death and his will, and gifts the diamond publicly to Hope, who accepts, much to Liam's chagrin. Wyatt soon learns his mother is back in LA and keeps it a secret. Quinn tells Wyatt she is better and is an outpatient. He warns her to stay away from Liam, and not involve herself in his love life.

Soon, Wyatt gets a call from the Mexican police saying they want to interview him about Ricardo's death. Wyatt asks his mom if she killed Ricardo, but she denies it. Later, Wyatt, Rick and Hope all travel to Paris for a photoshoot promoting the diamond. Hope tells Wyatt that Liam will meet her in Paris to marry her after the photoshoot and she will be forced to return the diamond. Wyatt tries to convince her to dump Liam and come back to him, to no avail. Wyatt tells his mother about his troubles and warns her to stay away from Liam. However, unknown to him, Quinn follows Ivy and Liam to Paris and sabotages Liam's plans to marry Hope by pushing Ivy into the River Seine, forcing Liam to save her. Hope believes Liam decided not to show up, since they argued about Wyatt and the diamond before the photoshoot. Devastated, she accompanies Wyatt on the Spencer jet to Monte Carlo to be on Bill's yacht. Wyatt tells her that Liam has always failed her, but he never will. He then proposes to Hope on the yacht with the HFTF diamond. Hope, realizing that Wyatt is the man she has really wanted all along and that Liam was just a fantasy for her, marries him on the yacht. Liam later finds out from Bill and is devastated. Hope finds out about Quinn pushing Ivy into the Seine which resulted in Liam being late to meet her. Hope almost ends the marriage to reunite with Liam but finds out she is pregnant with Wyatt's baby. Hope then demands that Wyatt keep Quinn away from her and the baby in future but during a confrontation with Quinn, Hope falls down the steps at the Logan Mansion and has a miscarriage. Blaming Wyatt for not keeping his mother away from her, Hope leaves LA to join her mother in Milan, Italy. Wyatt follows Hope and off screen tries to reconcile with his wife. However, after a period of time Wyatt returns to LA and files for divorce, mutually ending the marriage.

Wyatt returns to work at Forrester Creations but after a confrontation with the CEO who is also his former brother in-law, Rick Forrester, Wyatt briefly resigns only to get his job back at Bill and Liam's demand, who are trying to get Rick out of the company and take it over. Wyatt than has a brief relationship with Nicole Avant, who is the younger sister of Maya Avant. The relationship ends when Nicole finds out that Wyatt was only using her to find out what Maya's secret was in order to get her boyfriend, Rick out as CEO. Wyatt than has an attraction toward Steffy Forrester, Liam's ex-wife and they kiss. However, nothing comes of it when it is clear that Steffy isn't over Liam. Eventually, Liam chooses Steffy over Ivy, and Ivy and Wyatt enter into a relationship on the rebound, sleeping together and having strong feelings. But Ivy ultimately cheats on Wyatt, kissing Thomas. Wyatt decides to forgive her, but later overhears her admit that she still loves Liam. Wyatt breaks up with her, and she unsuccessfully tries to get back with Liam, only to be rejected and returns to Australia. Later, Liam disappears (he was really kidnapped by Quinn and lost his memory), and Wyatt comforts Steffy, telling her that Liam must have once again let her down. He shows her how to have fun by surfing on the beach and even buys her a motorcycle, which she hasn't driven since her miscarriage. The two fall in love and eventually get married on the beach. The two then get matching wedding band tattoos to symbolise their love for each other.

Wyatt began making Steffy the face of Spencer Publications' social media and promised her that Quinn would no longer be a problem for them. However, Wyatt soon discovers that Quinn had begun an affair with Steffy's grandfather, Eric Forrester. Quinn and Eric were married in September 2016, and Wyatt stood by Steffy and the rest of the Forrester family in boycotting the wedding. Wyatt supports Quinn when she is appointed interim CEO while Eric recovers from a brain aneurysm, caused by an argument he was having with his family over the wedding boycott. During this time, Ridge and Steffy lied to Quinn and the rest if the Forrester family by claiming that Ridge had Eric's power of attorney, when in fact Quinn had it. Ridge's attempt to regain control of Forrester Creations failed and Wyatt told Quinn about Steffy and Ridge's lie. When Steffy finds out that Wyatt had betrayed her trust and that their marriage was based on the lie of Liam's disappearance, Steffy filed for divorce, and returned to Liam. A few weeks before the divorce was due to be finalised, Quinn suggested to Eric that Steffy should be made CEO of Forrester Creations, to which he agrees. Wyatt and Steffy realise that this was part of Quinn's scheme to reunite them, and Wyatt agreed to fast-track the divorce as a result.

Wyatt and Steffy both have their wedding band tattoos removed after the finalisation of the divorce, and Wyatt leaves his position at Forrester Creations to return to Spencer Publications. Wyatt did not attend Steffy and Liam's wedding in Australia.

When Katie stepped in Wyatt's old PR position at Forrester Creations, Wyatt decided to help her and together they created a fashion event focusing on swimwear to be held during the Forrester/Spectra fashion duel in Monte Carlo. Excited over the success of the show, Katie and Wyatt kissed repeatedly, but Katie was dubious about exploring things with him because of their connections to Bill and Quinn. Katie and Wyatt decided to keep their newfound relationship a secret and to have a no-strings attached relationship. Over time, Katie and Wyatt's relationship is discovered by Eric, Quinn, Brooke, Ridge and Liam. When Wyatt saw Katie kissing Thorne Forrester (Ingo Rademacher), he broke off their no-strings attached relationship and let Katie go. In the time of their separation, Wyatt understood his true feelings for Katie, and he proposed to her. Wyatt and Katie got engaged and they prepared themselves to tell the truth to Bill. Bill reacts with anger to the news, threatening Wyatt and Katie to break off the engagement or else he will remove all of Wyatt's family privileges as well as sue for full custody of Will, believing no judge would side with them since Wyatt is engaged to his half-brother's mother.

== Reception ==
"The Bold and the Beautiful just added a little more star power to its cast" said Daytime Confidential in response to the casting announcement. "Liam is gonna crap" said Michael Logan in response to the character coming in between Liam and Hope. Michael Fairman said "Wowza!" in response to the casting and applauded the series for "finally" expanding the triangle. "Well, it’s about freaking time!" said Kambra Clifford in response to the decision to give Hope a love interest besides Liam.

"Brooks brought his charm, sex appeal, and acting chops to B&B after winning a Daytime Emmy a few years ago on DAYS, and working in primetime. Now back on soaps, Brook’s Mr. Fuller is really making a case for Hope (Kim Matula) to be with him … instead of wishy-washy Liam (Scott Clifton)!"

— On-Air On-Soaps on the character of Wyatt and Brooks's portrayal.

According to Brooks, the reaction to Wyatt on social media was initially very mixed. However, his co-star Scott Clifton said the support for Wyatt was very overwhelming due to Liam's checkered past with Hope. TV Source Magazine described Brooks's introduction as "memorable." Dan J. Kroll described Wyatt's first appearance as "eye-opening." Luke Kerr said the series "isn't wasting a moment" getting Brooks to strip, in reference to Wyatt being naked in his first scene. CBS Soaps In Depth said of the character's introduction: "Most men would get slapped for going around planting unsolicited kisses on a girl who is adamantly engaged to someone else, but somehow, Wyatt manages to not only pull it off but also melt our hearts in the process." ABC Soaps In Depth listed Wyatt in their "Best & Worst of 2013" list as the "Coolest Cat." Of the character, the magazine said, "we can't help being charmed by Liam's new sibling Wyatt. Although the guy's cockiness easily could have come off as obnoxious, portrayer Darin Brooks instead had us eating out of the palm of his hand!" When asked to compare Brooks to Wyatt, Scott Clifton said much like his portrayer, Wyatt has a certain "ease" when he comes into a new environment. "They're very comfortable and it makes you very comfortable around them. Darin brings a lot of that to Wyatt. Wyatt doesn't walk around worried about how people are going to perceive him. That's a cool quality that I wish I had more of, actually." However, Clifton said "The arrogance" in Wyatt is what sets Brooks apart from his character. Michael Fairman said that Wyatt's vow to never interfere in a marriage makes him "a bit more redeemable." Michael Fairman of On-Air On-Soaps described the character of Wyatt as "defiant and confident" and said the character's introduction as a "breath of fresh air into the Liam/Hope relationship." In their "Best and Worst of 2013" list, On-Air On-Soaps listed the character of Wyatt as the "Best New Character, Male."

In 2022, Charlie Mason from Soaps She Knows placed Wyatt 19th on his ranked list of The Bold and the Beautiful’s Best of the Best Characters Ever, commenting "Just don’t you dare call Darin Brooks' character the poor man's Liam. He’s flip-flopped half as much as his half-brother and had us rooting for him every misstep of the way!"
