= Hope Logan =

Fictional character from The Bold and the Beautiful

- The Bold and the Beautiful character
- Annika Noelle as Hope Logan
- Portrayed by: Rachel and Amanda Pace (2004–2009); Kim Matula (2010–2016); Annika Noelle (2018–present); (and others)
- Duration: 2002–2016; 2018–present
- First appearance: January 25, 2002
- Created by: Bradley Bell
- Introduced by: Bradley Bell
- Book appearances: Stormswept (2014)
In-universe information
- Other names: Hope Sharpe; Hope Spencer; Hope Forrester
- Occupation: Businesswoman; Model
- Family: Logan
- Parents: Deacon Sharpe; Brooke Logan
- Adoptive parents: Nick Marone
- Half-brothers: Eric Sharpe; Rick Forrester; R.J. Forrester; Jack Marone
- Half-sisters: Bridget Forrester
- Spouse: Liam Spencer (2012, 2018–2019, 2020–2023, 2025–present); Wyatt Spencer (2014–2015); Thomas Forrester (2019)
- Children: Beth Spencer
- Adoptive children: Douglas Forrester
- Stepchildren: Kelly Spencer
- Grandfathers: Daryl Sharpe; Stephen Logan
- Grandmothers: Beth Logan
- Aunts and uncles: Storm Logan; Donna Logan; Katie Logan
- Nieces and nephews: Logan Knight; Lizzy Forrester
- First cousins: Flo Fulton; Marcus Forrester; Will Spencer

Hope Logan is a fictional character from The Bold and the Beautiful, an American soap opera on the CBS network. The character was portrayed by several child actors since Hope's introduction in 2002, most notably Rachel and Amanda Pace. In 2010, the role was rapidly aged and recast with actress Kim Matula, who made her first appearance in January 2010. Matula departed the serial as a series regular in December 2014, but she made guest appearances in 2015 and 2016. As of 2018, the role is portrayed by Annika Noelle.

Introduced in 2002, Hope is the result of an affair between Brooke Logan and Deacon Sharpe, Brooke's then son-in-law. Upon Matula's casting, her main storylines revolved around relationships with former love interests Liam and Wyatt Spencer, and rivalry with Steffy Forrester, the latter of which mirrors the rivalry between their mothers, Brooke Logan and Taylor Hayes. Hope was most recently in a relationship with Thomas Forrester.

Matula was nominated for the Daytime Emmy Award for Outstanding Younger Actress in a Drama Series in 2014 for her portrayal of Hope. Noelle's portrayal later earned a nomination for the Daytime Emmy Award for Outstanding Supporting Actress in a Drama Series.

== Casting ==
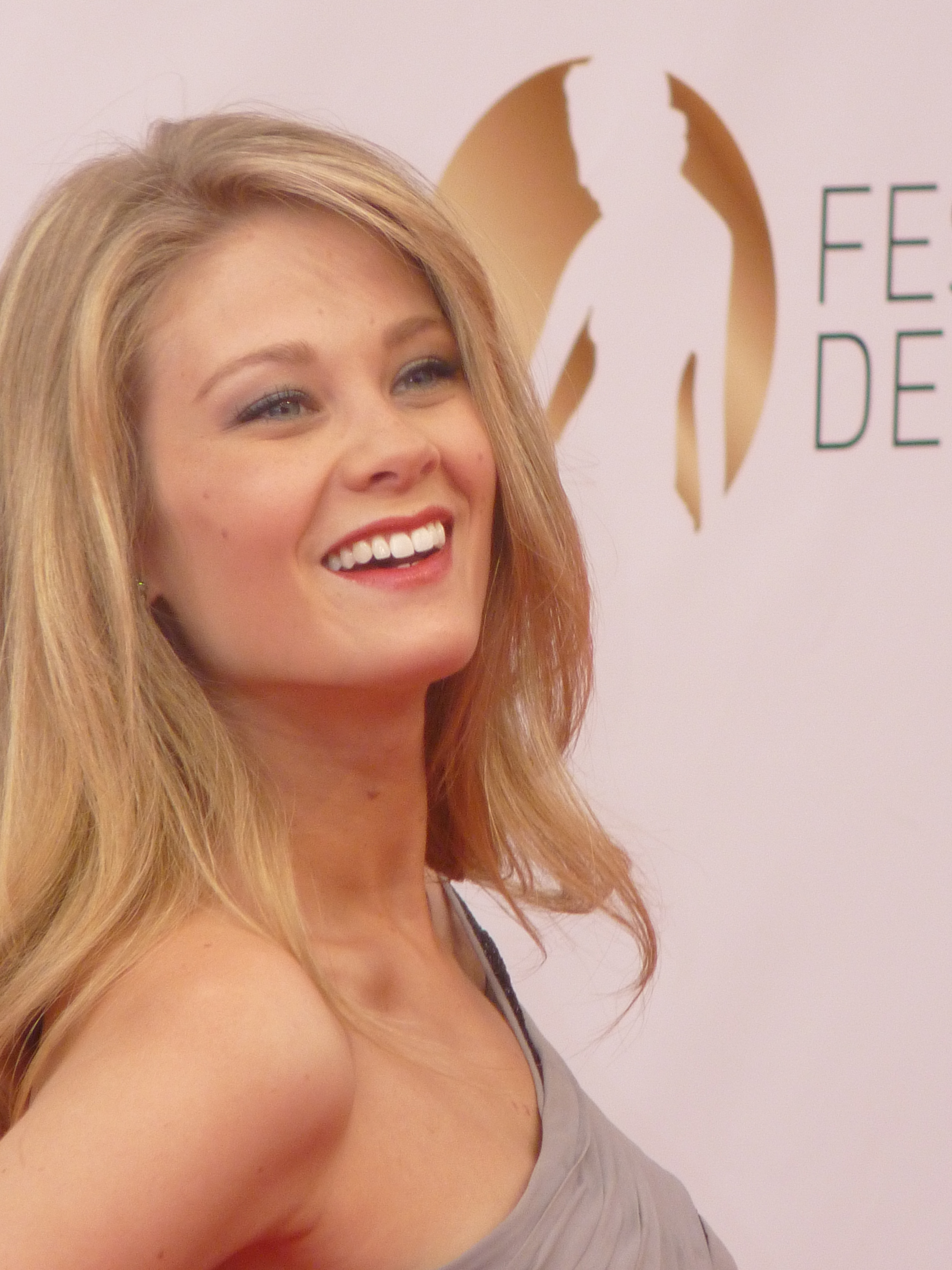
Kim Matula debuted in the rapidly aged role of Hope in 2010.

Between the years of 2002 and 2009, the character was played by child actresses, appearing as a young girl around five years old by 2007. On December 4, 2009, it was announced that Hope was to be rapidly aged (SORAS), with Kimberly Matula cast in the role. Signing on as a series regular, she began taping that same month, and made her first appearance on January 11, 2010. On November 5, 2014, it was announced that after five years with the serial, Matula would exit the role. She taped her final scene on November 6, and made her final appearance on December 12, 2014. In March 2015, Soap Opera Digest reported Matula would make a return to the series, in a guest capacity; she taped her scenes on March 4, 2015, and they aired during the April 17 and 20 broadcasts. In February 2016, it was announced she'd again make a guest return to the soap; she appeared on March 16, 2016.

In November 2017, Soap Opera Digest announced that actress Annika Noelle had been cast in the role of Hope; she made her first appearance on January 8 of the following year.

== Characterization ==
The young adult character of Hope was first described as "A polar opposite of what her mother Brooke once was, Hope makes no secret of her more traditional and reserved views on sex and marriage." Matula has described Hope as "unlucky in love." Speaking on the character's dramatic aging and her storyline, head writer Bradley Bell stated: "Aging the character of 'Hope' to a teenager allows us to bring the next generation of 'Logans' to the forefront, as well as play a broader range of the 'Forrester' vs. 'Logan' story. 'Hope's' presence at Forrester Creations, as well as in ‘Brooke’ and ‘Ridge’s’ home, sparks an intense competition between ‘Hope’ and her step-sister 'Steffy' as well as creates new conflict between long-time rivals 'Brooke' and 'Taylor' as each woman is determined to protect her own daughter."

== Storylines ==
=== 2002–2016 ===
Hope was conceived during an affair between Brooke Logan (Katherine Kelly Lang) and Deacon Sharpe (Sean Kanan). At the time, Deacon was married to Hope's half-sister, Bridget Forrester. Hope was born at the Big Bear Cabin and delivered by Stephanie. Deacon signed over his parental rights in 2007 to Ridge Forrester when Hope was taken from Brooke, as she was proven to be an unfit mother by Social Services. She was reported by Stephanie Forrester (Susan Flannery). Nick Marone (Jack Wagner) was also a father figure for Hope when he was married to Brooke.

After the character is dramatically aged (SORASed), Hope is almost raped by a photographer, Graham Darros, but she is saved by Nick and Aggie Jones (Sarah Joy Brown). As high school graduation approaches, she meets Oliver Jones, a DJ who becomes her first serious boyfriend. Instantly, the assertive Steffy takes an interest in Oliver, teasing him in front of Hope for a reaction. At a fashion show, Pam Douglas tampers with a sign by removing the letters 'p' and 'e' out of Hope's name to create a sign that reads "Ho Logan." Then, at Hope's graduation party, Brooke has sex with Oliver, claiming she thought it was her husband Ridge behind the mask; this is revealed by a video that Steffy located. It was later revealed the video was tampered with by Justin Barber (Aaron D. Spears) and Liam Cooper (Scott Clifton), who worked for Spencer Publications – who are against Forrester Creations. Despite unresolved feelings, Hope forgives her mother and tries to recover her relationship with Oliver until she meets Liam.

Hope meets Liam Cooper, who was soon revealed as the son of Bill Spencer Jr. Hope and Liam forge a friendship but there is something more there which Oliver sees whenever they are together. Liam and Hope fall deeply in love. Their love grows despite Oliver trying to win back Hope by making her jealous. Liam and Hope's relationship faces hardship when Amber falls pregnant after supposedly sleeping with Liam, and Liam is thought to be the father. Amber manipulates Liam every chance she gets and causes problems for Liam and Hope. Hope tries to move on, but Steffy encourages her to trust Liam. The baby is born, and it is quite evident the baby is not Liam's, turns out to be Marcus's baby instead.

Liam and Hope reunite, and he proposes to her. However, she wanted to use this as a way to promote her fashion line, so their wedding was planned for months ahead. Hope tells Liam she wants to wait to consummate their relationship after marriage, Steffy supports the relationship and Liam (who saves her from drowning when she hits her head after falling in the bath) until she hears so much about the pain Liam is going through. Steffy came to believe that Hope was not right for him and fell in love with Liam. Finally, the night before the wedding, Steffy is conned into collecting Liam from his bachelor party. Steffy says goodbye and good luck to Liam and offers a goodbye kiss. After witnessing the kiss, Hope takes off her engagement ring and leaves it at Liam's house. Hope spoke with Liam by phone and said that she does not want to get married, talk to him or see him again.

Heartbroken and angry, Liam takes the ring and proposes to Steffy, who accepts. Liam and Steffy travel to Aspen, where they are married. Thomas set his eyes on Hope. They shared a kiss despite Hope's unresolved feelings for Liam. Thomas whisks her away to Mexico for a weekend holiday without realizing that he is taking Hope to Liam's honeymoon. Thomas proposes to Hope, who says she is not ready and that she still loves Liam but feels safe with Thomas. Liam sees Hope and goes after Thomas and Hope on an ATV chase. Steffy chases Liam on another ATV and ends up in the hospital. Bill perpetuates a lie about Steffy's health, bribing the doctors to say that her life was at risk, and she must not be upset. Katie finds out about the lie and 'blames' Steffy.

Liam, betrayed by Bill and Steffy, leaves to find Hope and confesses his love for her. They confront Bill, who reminds him that Steffy is his wife. Liam decides to end his marriage with Steffy, and Steffy refuses to sign annulment papers. Brooke arranges a wedding for Hope and Liam, but Steffy refuses. Hope's first attempt at adultery is traumatized, and she becomes addicted to anxiety pills and illegal medication. Liam is sent to Aspen to cover Steffy's ski line, and Hope accidentally runs into Steffy on the slopes. Steffy is taken to the hospital, and Liam refers to her as his 'wife'. Hope confesses to Liam that she is addicted to pills.

Once the divorce becomes final, Liam and Hope went to Italy at Brooke's insistence to marry. Bill interferes, bringing in Deacon Sharpe so Hope is late to the wedding. Liam, thinking that she had once again walked out on him, turned to Steffy for comfort and asked her to leave with him and marry him again. Hope then arrived at Liam's hotel suite, with Steffy in the bathroom, hearing it all, while Hope told Liam what happened. Steffy insisted that Liam go ahead and marry Hope, so the wedding went off without a hitch. Once back in the States, Hope saw a video of Steffy and Liam kissing and falling onto the bed together on 'Hope's wedding day' and refuses to sign papers making their marriage legal in the US. Hope insists on another wedding. Liam agrees, and Hope plans another wedding at the Forrester Estate, with yet another new designer gown.

The night before the next wedding, Hope and Liam makes plans to spend the evening together – a 'date' night, but Stephanie is not well, and Hope decides to stay with her. Sworn to secrecy by Stephanie about her illness, Hope phones Liam and cancels their 'date'. Liam goes straight to where he knows Steffy will be, with her girlfriends and a DJ stint (working). Liam went off with some people who were unknown to Steffy and returned, drunk and with a red streak in his hair and a removable tattoo. He went to the roof and fell asleep on a lounger. Steffy found him there and stayed on another lounger, waking him, to take him to the wedding venue. Liam went to have a shower and clean up, for the wedding, but Hope heard Steffy's motorcycle and went to see Liam, before he had a chance to wash it off. Outraged by Liam's continued reliance on Steffy, Hope calls off the wedding and her relationship with Liam. Thomas and Hope then becomes friends. On the professional front, Hope cancels the wedding line, making a public announcement that there will be no wedding.

Liam and Steffy then join in a living commitment, but Steffy is called to Paris. Hope tries to seduce Liam. Steffy leaves for Paris, giving Liam time to decide who he wants to be with. He asks Steffy to move out when she returns. Brooke sets up a surprise wedding for Hope and Liam, with the priest from Italy, ready to marry him and Hope. Steffy finds out about the wedding, and shows up and informs Liam about their baby, and if he is following Brooke's plan, he deserves to know before making the commitment. Liam agrees to co-parent with Steffy, but this upsets Hope, and she leaves in tears. Brooke reveals that he is just with Steffy because she got herself pregnant on purpose.

Steffy, who lost her and Liam's child in an accident, asks Hope to be with Liam and give him the family he wants. Hope falls unconscious and is rescued by Wyatt Fuller, the half-brother of Liam. Wyatt and Hope get closer after Liam flies off to see Steffy. Steffy rejects him and Liam comes home and proposes to Hope, who accepts. Wyatt moves in with Liam, but when Liam catches him kissing Hope, Wyatt moves out. After Hope and Liam have an argument, Hope and Wyatt fly to Mexico to get the Hope Diamond for the line, which makes problems for Liam. Hope and Liam get engaged, but tension arises when Hope receives a goodbye video made for Steffy. Liam confronts Hope about her refusal to marry and demands they cut ties with Wyatt and Quinn Artisan Jewelers. On the day of the wedding, Hope finds Liam with Steffy at the cabin. Hope decides to rehire Quinn and goes to Hawaii with Wyatt. Liam follows and asks Hope to marry him immediately but Hope declines. Hope gives Wyatt a chance, but this is short-lived when Wyatt steals the Hope diamond. Hope gives him another chance. After a pregnancy scare, Hope decides to date both brothers, agreeing to choose one of them as her life partner.

Hope chooses Liam and they become engaged, with Wyatt supporting their relationship. Wyatt inherits the Hope for the Future Diamond, which Liam demands she give back. Hope refuses and lays an ultimatum for Liam to meet at a photo shoot. Wyatt begs Hope not to marry Liam, and Liam misses his deadline. Wyatt proposes to Hope using the diamond, and Hope marries Wyatt. A month later, Hope learns she is pregnant, and Liam asks her to leave Wyatt. Hope explains she wants her child to have a complicated relationship and ends things with Liam. She suffers a miscarriage and leaves L.A., leaving in tears and visiting Brooke in Milan, Italy.

In Milan, according to Hope, she 'dated' and had a 'few relationships', but she could not get over Liam. When Brooke and Ridge married again, Hope was invited home, for the wedding and decided to stay. She made an agreement with Ridge, to stay out of Steffy's marriage with Liam, and she could work again on her 'label' HFTF.

=== 2018–present ===
Hope returns to Los Angeles in January 2018, at Ridge's request, to surprise her mother. She makes her intentions known of returning to Forrester. When Hope meets Sally Spectra II, she finds out that Liam and Steffy's marriage is in trouble, so she visits Liam to offer her support and friendship. Hope learns of Steffy and Bill sleeping together. Hope later starts to fall in love with Liam again. Bill manipulates Liam to believe that Bill and Steffy are involved. Liam leaves Steffy and their daughter, Kelly, and proposes to Hope. Liam decides to give Steffy another chance for the sake of Kelly, but Hope soon discovers she is pregnant from the one night she and Liam spent together before their aborted wedding. Steffy catches Liam and Hope making out behind the scenes of the Hope for the Future fashion show, and she breaks up with him. Steffy steps back and gives Liam to Hope because she can no longer be involved in a triangle for Liam's heart, and she needs to do what is best for Kelly. In August 2018, Hope and Liam wed in front of their friends, families, Steffy, and Taylor. They blissfully awaited the birth of their daughter & basked in the happiness they had always longed for.

In 2019, Hope and Liam are devastated when their daughter, Elizabeth 'Beth' Avalon Spencer, is stillborn. Dr. Reese Buckingham had stolen their daughter and gave them a stillborn baby girl. Steffy adopted the baby and named her Phoebe. Hope's marriage to Liam crumbles, and she meets Wyatt's ex-girlfriend Flo, who is searching for Phoebe's biological father. Hope welcomes Flo into their family and also helps Douglas heal from Caroline's death.

Afterwards, Thomas starts to be obsessed with Hope and manipulates Caroline's death by writing a fake letter saying that Douglas needs a mother and wants Hope to be that mother figure for him. Thomas also uses Douglas to convince Hope to be with his dad, which leads to Hope and Liam getting an annulment after wanting to fulfill Caroline's wish. Hope pushes Liam into being with Steffy and wanting him to raise Kelly and Phoebe together. Hope accepts Thomas's proposal. Hope almost had second thoughts about marrying Thomas, until Liam revealed that he and Steffy had sex one night. When Hope and Thomas are married, she still loves Liam, but wants to move forward with Beth being gone. Hope feels unconformable with Thomas's advances and does not want to have sex with him.

When Hope is about to go on her honeymoon with Thomas, Douglas reveals to Hope and Liam that their daughter Beth is alive. Hope believes that Douglas is simply confused and goes on her honeymoon with Thomas. Their honeymoon is cut short when Hope still refuses to have sex with Thomas. Thomas and Hope goes back to L.A. at Forester's, and Hope locks the office door. Liam storms in the office to tell Hope that Douglas is telling the truth: that Beth is alive, and Flo has lied about being Phoebe's birth mother. Hope at first refuses to believe Liam until he reveals to her that he confronted Flo, and Flo confirmed that she was never pregnant.

Hope tries to process Liam's information, but Thomas breaks down the door, punches Liam, and takes Hope to the helicopter. Hope tries to calm him down and asks Thomas to tell her the truth about Beth. Thomas lies to her and tells her to forget about Beth. Liam sprints and attacks Thomas. After Thomas tries to escape to the helicopter, Liam puts him in a headlock and forces Thomas to tell Hope about keeping Beth away from her. When Hope sees that Thomas cannot look her in the eye, she finally realizes that Beth is alive. Thomas then punches Liam again and escapes to his helicopter. Hope and Liam cry tears of joy, and Liam says that their daughter was here this whole time, that Steffy had her but did not know about Phoebe being Beth. Finally, Hope and Liam go over Steffy's house and Hope holds her daughter Beth for the first time. When Hope asks how Steffy had their daughter Beth, Liam reveals that he overheard Thomas and Flo arguing at her wedding and Thomas said that Hope cannot know about a secret.

Liam had asked Wyatt to talk to Flo to get her to open up, and Flo accidentally revealed that she never had a baby to Wyatt. After Douglas had told Liam about Phoebe being Beth, Liam called the hospital in Las Vegas where Flo supposedly had Phoebe, and it turns out that Flo was never a patient at the hospital and there was no medical records of her being there. Flo also revealed to Liam and Wyatt that Dr. Buckingham owed some people for a gambling debt and needed to pay them, or they would kill his daughter, Zoe. Liam goes on reveal that a woman who was also Dr. Buckingham's patient lost her baby, which was stillborn in Catalina. When Hope passed out after giving birth to Beth, he switched the babies. Hope learns that she held the unknown woman's stillborn baby, believing that Beth was dead. Liam says that Taylor told Reese that Steffy was looking to adopt a sister for Kelly, and Reese told that there was a woman who is willing to adopt, portrayed by Flo. Liam explains to Hope that Dr. Buckingham and Flo knew each other from Las Vegas, and he needed her to pose as the birth mother to "Phoebe." Liam then tells Hope that Taylor did not know about Phoebe being Beth, and that she gave Dr. Buckingham a lot of money in cash for their daughter. Crying and in shock, Hope asks Liam who else knew about Beth. Liam says that Zoe knew (but did not want her dad to get arrested) along with Xander Avant and Emma Barber.

Liam reveals that Emma found out when Zoe and Xander were arguing, and Emma was on her way to tell Hope the truth before she died. Liam warns Hope that Thomas knew about Beth around the time they got an annulment and that he was chasing Emma when crashed her car in a ditch, which was attributed to her texting while driving. Hope apologizes to Liam, and vows to leave Thomas for his deceit. When Steffy returns, Hope and Liam tell her about Flo not being Phoebe's birth mother and that Phoebe is Beth. Hope and Steffy argue about Beth and that Steffy still wants to keep her. Steffy realizes that Hope was robbed of being Beth's mother and decides to give Beth back to Hope and Liam, much to Steffy's sadness. Afterwards, Hope and Liam go to the cabin and Douglas arrives. Hope lets Douglas knows that she is happy that she has her daughter back, and that she thanks him for telling the truth. Hope tells Douglas that she will still take care of him.

Hope and Liam have a celebration on having Beth back with their family. While going back to the cabin Flo is there. After putting Beth down, Hope confronts Flo about her betrayal and tells her that she will never forgive her for keeping her daughter away from her for months. Hope and Liam talks with Justin about reversing the adoption and serving Thomas annulment papers for his deceit. Hope later contacts Thomas to confront him on keeping Beth away from her, manipulating her grief, and using Douglas. Hope announces that they are getting a divorce. When Hope is getting the rest of Beth's things from Steffy's house, Thomas shows up and wants to convince her to not end their marriage. Hope does not want to hear him and tries to leave but Thomas grabs her. Hope breaks free and runs outside, but Thomas tries to tell her that if he had told the truth, she would leave him for Liam. Hope tries to get out of his grip and tells him that it is over between them. Brooke arrives to the Steffy's house and gets Hope out of Thomas' grip. When Thomas tries to apologize, Brooke pushes him out of the way, and Thomas falls over the cliff.

At the hospital, Hope angrily wants Thomas to wake up so that he can face the consequences of his action. Thomas awakens and tells Detective Sanchez that his fall was an accident in front of Brooke, Ridge, Liam and Hope. Thomas apologizes to Hope for lying to her and hopes she can forgive him. Hope, Liam and Beth are at the cabin, and Hope tells Liam that she will never forgive Thomas for keeping Beth away from them. Hope believes that Thomas only told Detective Sanchez that Brooke pushed him by accident in hopes to get back in her good graces. Liam tells her that they still got a lot of time with Beth and to only worry about the present.

== Reception ==
In 2022, Charlie Mason from Soaps She Knows placed Hope 10th on his ranked list of The Bold and the Beautiful's Best of the Best Characters Ever, saying "Our Hope For the Future? More of this sweetheart, a born-to-be-distressed damsel who's striven to take the high road, whether she has been played by Kim Matula or Annika Noelle."
