= Courtney Grosbeck =

American actress and model (born 2000)

- Born: July 9, 2000 (age 25); Jupiter, Florida, U.S.
- Occupations: Actress; model
- Years active: 2011–present
- Known for: The Bold and The Beautiful; Lincoln Rhyme: Hunt for the Bone Collector
- Height: 1.59 m (5 ft 2.60 in)

Courtney Grosbeck (born 9 July 2000) is an American actress and model, best known for playing the role of Coco Spectra in the soap The Bold and the Beautiful and Rachel Sachs in the series Lincoln Rhyme: Hunt for the Bone Collector.

== Career ==
Courtney Grosbeck in 2011 began her career as an actress in the series DayDREAMers. That same year, she played the role of Belinda Bawinkle in the film Gina and the G.I.T. (Genie-In-Training) directed by Marc C. Zatorsky. From 2012 to 2015, she played the role of Ruby Rizzoli in the series Parenthood. In 2013, she played the role of Carly in an episode of the series Modern Family.

In 2015 she played the role of Gwen Graves in the short film Call to Heroes directed by John Wynn. In the same year she covered the role of Dani in the series The Player. The following year, 2016, she played the role of Jane in the short film The Waste Land directed by Brian Brooks II.

In 2017 and 2018 she was chosen to play the role of Coco Spectra in the soap opera The Bold and the Beautiful. In 2018, she played the role of Jamie Porter in the television film Neighborhood Watch directed by Jake Helgren. That same year she played Josie Mathison-Dunn in the series Homeland.

In 2019 she played the role of Dot in the short film Then & Now directed by Niki Koss. The following year, 2020, she played the role of Rachel Sachs in the series Lincoln Rhyme: Hunt for the Bone Collector. In the same year she played the role of Young Darby in the series Love Life.

== Filmography ==
=== Films ===
Year	Title	Role	Director
2011	Gina and the G.I.T. (Genie-In-Training)	Belinda Bawinkle	Marc C. Zatorsky

=== TV series ===
Year	Title	Role	Notes
2011	DayDREAMers		1 episode
2012–2015	Parenthood	Ruby Rizzoli	12 episodes
2013	Modern Family	Carly	1 episodes
2015	The Player	Dani	2 episodes
2017–2018	The Bold and the Beautiful	Coco Spectra	73 episodes
2018	Neighborhood Watch	Jamie Porter	Telefilme
2018	Homeland	Josie Mathison-Dunn	5 episodes
2020	Lincoln Rhyme: Hunt for the Bone Collector	Rachel Sachs	10 episodes
2020	Love Life	Young Darby	1 episode
2025	The Pitt	Piper Fisher	4 episodes

=== Short films ===
Year	Title	Role	Director
2015	Call to Heroes	Gwen Graves	John Wynn
2016	The Waste Land	Jane	Brian Brooks II
2019	Then & Now	Dot	Niki Koss

== Awards and nominations ==
Year	Award	Category	Work	Result
2019	Madrid International Film Festival	Best Supporting Actress in a Short Film	Then & Now	Won
