= Darin Brooks =

American actor

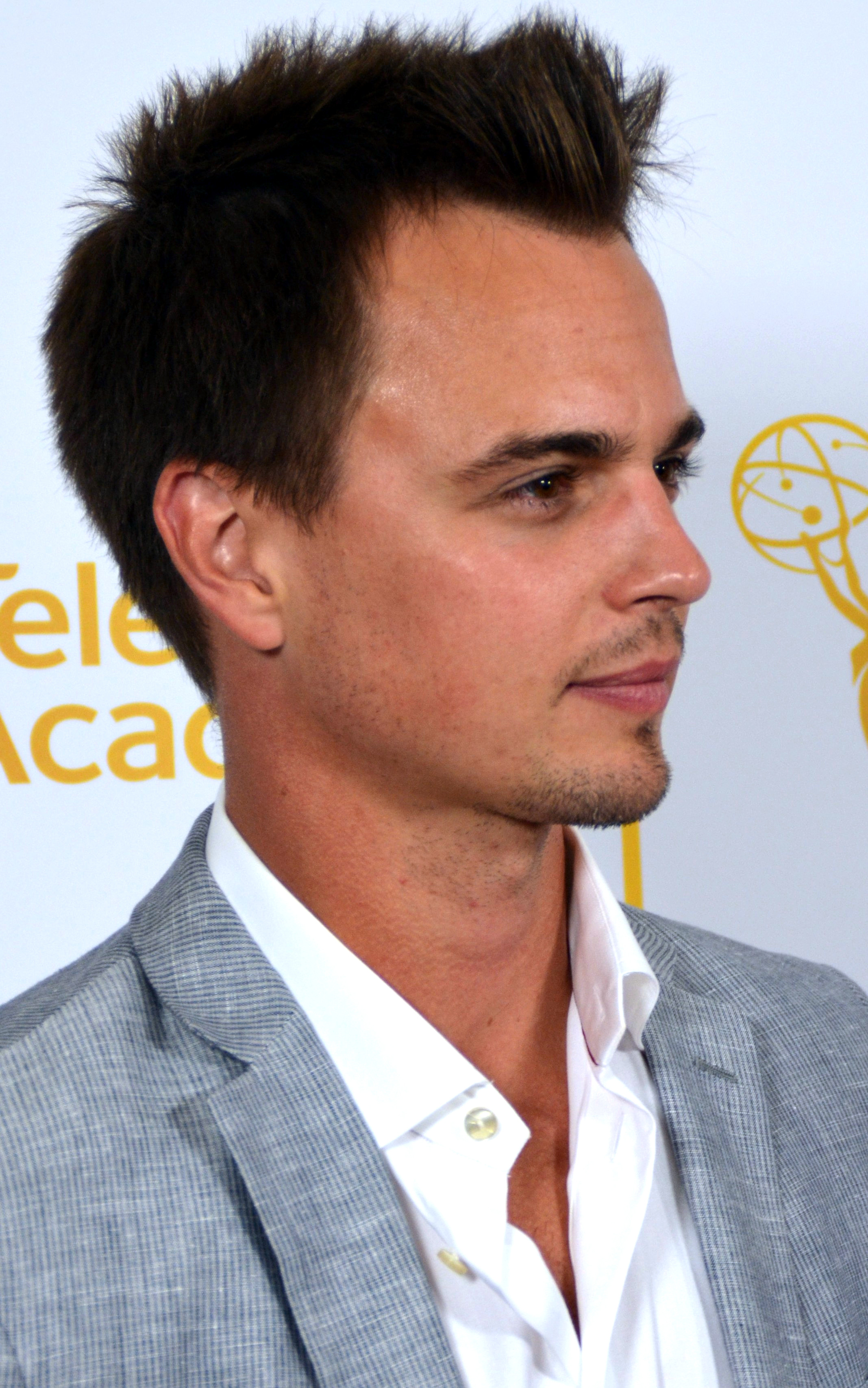
- Brooks at the 2014 Daytime Emmy Awards Nominees Cocktail Reception in June 2014
- Born: Darin Lee Brooks; May 27, 1984 (age 42); Honolulu, Hawaii, U.S
- Occupation: Actor
- Years active: 2005–present
- Spouse: Kelly Kruger (m. 2016; div. 2026)
- Children: 2

Darin Lee Brooks (born May 27, 1984) is an American actor. He is known for portraying Max Brady on the NBC daytime soap opera Days of Our Lives, Alex Moran on the Spike TV series Blue Mountain State, and Wyatt Spencer on the CBS soap opera The Bold and the Beautiful.

== Early life ==
Brooks was born and raised in Honolulu, Hawaii. Brooks graduated from Henry J. Kaiser High School in 2002. He is of Polish descent.

== Career ==
Brooks started his acting career with the theater program at his high school. He played Rapunzel's prince in his high school's production of Into the Woods. He later enrolled in acting classes, began modeling, and worked as an extra in films. He was discovered by casting director Kathy Henderson.

When Brooks moved to Los Angeles, California, he called Henderson immediately, took acting classes at the renowned Ivana Chubbuck Studios, and got an agent. Two years after the move, he auditioned for the soap operas One Life to Live and The Young and the Restless, and he was cast as Max Brady on the NBC's Days of Our Lives. He later starred as Alex Moran on the Spike TV series Blue Mountain State. In 2010, Brooks starred as Mr. Blake Owens on the web series Miss Behave. In June 2013, Brooks began playing Wyatt Spencer on the CBS soap opera The Bold and the Beautiful. In October 2023, after a decade on the show, Brooks announced his exit from the role and made his final appearance on January 19, 2024 .In May 2026, after an over 2 year absence, Brooks made his return to The Bold and the Beautiful.

== Personal life ==
Brooks enjoys playing the guitar, bass guitar, and drums. In 2010, he started dating actress Kelly Kruger. In February 2014, they partnered with an organization called Aid Still Required. On March 21, 2016, he and Kruger got married. In April 2019, it was announced that he and Kruger were expecting their first child. The couple's first child was born on September 22, 2019. In March 2026, the couple announced their separation and plans to divorce. Four months later, their divorce was finalized.

== Filmography ==
Film
Year	Title	Role	Notes
2005	Staring at the Sun	Smoker #1	Short
2010	Spotlight	Austin Pembelton	Short
2012	Choices	Jeff Hayes	Short
2012	Bad Girls	Benny	Television film
2012	The Seven Year Hitch	Kevin	Television film
2013	Liars All	Brax	
2015	Overexposed	Tucker Bailey	Short
2016	Blue Mountain State: The Rise of Thadland	Alex Moran	
2018	Groomzilla	Tucker Brennan	TV movie
2019	The Missing Sister	Frank	
2020	Her Secret Family Killer	Will	
2020	Gold Dust	Winters	
2022	The Art of Christmas	Reggie	TV movie
2025	The Roaring Game	Rickey Rhodes	

Television
Year	Title	Role	Notes
2005–2010	Days of Our Lives	Max Brady	Regular role
2010–2011	Blue Mountain State	Alex Moran	Regular role
2010	Miss Behave	Blake Owens	Recurring role
2011	CSI: Miami	Ian Kaufman	Episode: "F-T-F"
2011	Castle	Nick, Jr.	Episode: "Slice of Death"
2013	Bloomers	Ryan	Episodes: "Unexpecting" and "Mum's the Word"
2013–2024, 2026–present	The Bold and the Beautiful	Wyatt Spencer	Regular role
2013	Super Fun Night	Jason	Episodes: "Engagement Party" and "Dinner Party"
2017	2 Broke Girls	Frank	Episode: "And the Alley-Oops"
2021	The Young and the Restless	Wyatt Spencer	Guest: 2 episodes (February 12 and 15, 2021)
2021–2023	The Croods: Family Tree	Guy	Main voice role
2022	Amber Brown	Max	Main role

== Awards and nominations ==
List of awards and nominations
Year	Award	Category	Work	Result	Ref.
2008	Daytime Emmy Award	Outstanding Younger Actor in a Drama Series	Days of Our Lives	Nominated	
2009	Daytime Emmy Award	Outstanding Younger Actor in a Drama Series	Days of Our Lives	Won	
2014	Indie Series Award	Best Guest Star (Comedy)	Bloomers	Nominated	
2016	Soap Awards France	Best Actor of the Year	The Bold and the Beautiful	Nominated	
2020	Soap Hub Awards	Favorite The Bold and the Beautiful Actor	The Bold and the Beautiful	Nominated	
2021	Daytime Emmy Award	Outstanding Supporting Actor in a Drama Series	The Bold and the Beautiful	Nominated	
