= Pamela Douglas =

- The Bold and the Beautiful character
- Portrayed by: Alley Mills (2006–2024); Gigi Goff (2006)
- Duration: 2006–2019; 2021–2022; 2024
- First appearance: December 1, 2006
- Last appearance: December 24, 2024
- Created by: Bradley Bell
In-universe information
- Other names: Lorraine Douglas
- Occupation: Receptionist
- Father: John Douglas
- Mother: Ann Douglas
- Sisters: Stephanie Forrester
- Nephews: Ridge Forrester; Thorne Forrester
- Nieces: Angela Forrester; Kristen Forrester; Felicia Forrester
- Other relatives: Thomas Forrester; Steffy Forrester; Phoebe Forrester; R.J. Forrester; Zende Forrester; Aly Forrester; Dominick Damiano; Douglas Forrester; Kelly Spencer

Pamela "Pam" Douglas is a fictional character from the CBS soap opera, The Bold and the Beautiful, portrayed by Alley Mills. She made her first appearance during the episode broadcast on December 1, 2006. Pamela was introduced as the sister of established character Stephanie Forrester (Susan Flannery). She is a receptionist at Forrester Creations.

== Development ==
On November 30, 2006, Joel Keller from The Huffington Post reported that former Wonder Years actress Alley Mills had been cast in the "limited role" of Stephanie Forrester's (Susan Flannery) sister, Pamela Douglas. Mills made her first appearance as Pamela on December 1, 2006. The following year, executive producer Bradley Bell announced that Mills had signed a contract with the show. Pamela returned on January 11, 2007, after Stephanie invited her to LA and asked her to keep an eye on her husband, Eric (John McCook), while she was away.

When Flannery quit her role as Pamela's sister Stephanie in 2012, Mills became worried that she too would have to leave the show. She explained "Stephanie was Pamela's link to that world and so when Susan left, I wondered if I was going to go. Stephanie was the function of Pamela's life – she was always defending her and looking after her when she got sick." Mills was asked to stay with the show and she confirmed in 2014 that she had no plans to leave in the immediate future. Mills believed Pamela had "found a new lease on life at Forrester Creations" with her job as a receptionist. She also thought Pamela had become stronger and felt the 2014 Thanksgiving scenes showed that Pamela had finally become "part of the fabric of the clan". Mills added that Pamela would continue to be a "busybody" and an "oddball who roams around". In November 2019, it was announced that Mills had been placed on recurring status for the first time in eleven years.

== Storylines ==
Pamela Douglas and her sister, Stephanie, were raised by John and Ann Douglas in a suburb of Chicago. Stephanie married Eric Forrester and moved to Los Angeles, rarely mentioning her sister and telling everyone that her parents were dead. In reality, John had abused Stephanie as a child, which Ann had ignored. When Stephanie's controlling behavior got out hand, she sought therapy with Taylor Hayes, who suggested that Stephanie go to Chicago and confront Ann. With Eric at her side, Stephanie found Pamela taking care of a widowed Ann, who was still in denial. Pamela finally spoke up and confirmed the abuse, admitting she was too scared as a child to help her older sister.

Stephanie remained at odds with her family until Eric invited Pamela and Ann to Los Angeles for Christmas. After Ann returned to Chicago, Pam stayed on in the Forrester guest house and took a shine to Eric, actively discouraging Jackie Marone's interest. But Pam, who had a long-held resentment about Stephanie living the high life while she was stuck caring for their mother, started showing signs of instability. When Pam went off her medication for bipolar disorder, Ann feared that Pam had shot Stephanie, although Storm Logan had pulled the trigger.

Stephanie's marriage to Eric crumbled, and Eric moved on with Donna Logan. Pam trapped Donna in a tanning bed and turned Donna's hair and teeth green. Pam also replaced Eric's Viagra with sleeping pills. But Pam's pranks got more serious when Pam intimidated Donna with "Tiny", her giant Doberman, and threatened to kill Donna on several occasions. Eric and Stephanie blew off Donna's concerns about Pam. Tiny died after eating a lemon bar Donna threw to distract him. Finding out that the dog actually died from a reduced dose of heart medication did nothing to quell Pam's hatred of Donna.

After Donna and Eric were married, Eric had a heart attack in bed and slipped into a coma. Donna, who had been eyeing Owen Knight, was accused of spiking a bottle of gin. However, Eric had actually fallen ill after Pam fed him a laced lemon bar, only hoping to weaken him and make him sexually undesirable to Donna so Eric would go back to Stephanie. Pam lured Donna to the Big Bear cabin, where she held Donna at gunpoint, doused her with honey, and let a bear in to attack her. Pam ran off after Owen saved Donna.

A crate arrived for Donna at Forrester, but her son, Marcus Forrester, opened it and was bitten by a snake. Soon after, Donna's mother, Beth Logan, was hit by a car. Pam returned and promised to kill Donna's family, and even Eric, if Donna didn't leave Eric. Donna complied, but confided in Owen, who told Eric and Stephanie. Together, they coaxed Pam out of hiding by lying that Ann was deathly ill. Stephanie gently got Pam to admit that she did everything to make up for not protecting Stephanie from their father. It was revealed that Pam had developed a mass of scar tissue on her brain after falling down the stairs running from her father as a girl. Donna scoffed that a tumor couldn't have made Pam violent, but after an operation, Pame had no memory of what she'd done, and tried to make amends with Donna before being transferred to a facility in Chicago.

Pam returned for follow-ups in Los Angeles and was hired to design bikinis for Forrester's new surf line however, was later jailed on suspicion of blowing up Rick Forrester's car and setting fire to his house (the real culprit was Thomas Forrester). Pam's fascination with the game show, The Price Is Right, led her to make a clerical error on Ridge Forrester's marriage license, invalidating his marriage to Brooke Logan. Later, Pam and Donna ended up on The Price Is Right together and actually enjoyed themselves until Donna modeled the Royalty line's showstopper, Pam could not resist dumping gallons of honey on Donna.

Pam left Forrester and joined Stephanie, who had defected to Jackie M. Jackie befriended Pame, who fit in with Jackie M's "band of misfits." Later, Pam supported Stephanie through a mini-stroke, and found brief fame co-hosting fashion talk show The Catwalk with Donna, amusing audiences with her "cat dance." Ann made a mysterious trip from Chicago and announced she was dying. Stephanie and Pam butted heads when Pam took Ann to a hospital against Ann's wishes, so the Douglas sisters snuck in and broke Ann out of her room. Pam and Ann had a chance to resolve their issues before Ann died peacefully at Paradise Cove.

Pam returned to Forrester Creations with Stephanie and found an anti-Logan ally in Steffy Forrester. Pam sabotaged Hope Logan's Hope For the Future showing, rigging the sign to read "HO" For the Future, for which Steffy was blamed and wrongly fired. Donna's father, Stephen Logan, blamed Stephanie for her inadvertent part in the drowning death of his wife, Beth Logan, so Stephen romanced and deflowered the naïve Pamela, convincing her to stop taking her bipolar medication. Stephanie objected to Pam dating Stephen and dragged Pam to the Big Bear cabin. Stephen arrived and put a gun in Pam's hand, reminding Pam how much she resented Stephanie. Pam nearly shot Stephanie, but backed off, apologizing to Stephen for trying to kill Donna at that very cabin and asking Stephanie what "those poor Logan girls" had ever done to deserve Stephanie's hatred. Stephanie got the gun from Pame and shot Stephen, who later insisted his feelings for Pam were real. Pam and Stephen were soon engaged, and even made wedding plans.

Months later, Stephen inexplicably ditched Pame and ran off to Texas. Pamela cited Stephanie's lack of support, but the same day, Pam surprised Jackie's son, Nick Marone, in the Jackie M steam room. With Jackie M in financial trouble, Jackie convinced Pam to steal Forrester designs, promising Nick would return the favor with romance. Nick grimaced at first, but developed a genuine bond with Pam. After the Forresters saw their designs on Jackie M's runway and blamed Beverly, a new intern, Pam wanted to turn herself in.

Pam put itching powder in Donna's nightie when Nick showed an interest in Donna. Pam roped Nick into appearing on Let's Make A Deal, and when Donna saw them together on the show, she realized Pamela had stolen the designs and went straight to Stephanie. Pam confessed and was fired from her receptionist job. But after Stephanie forgave Pam and rehired her at the same time Brooke hired Donna for the position, Pam and Donna were forced to share receptionist duties, and a desk.

Pam flirts with the security guard of Forrester Creations Charlie Webber, later entering a romantic relationship and they are still together. In 2018, Pam and Charlie get engaged.

== Reception ==
In 2022, Charlie Mason from Soaps She Knows placed Pam at #25 on his ranked list of The Bold and the Beautiful’s Best of the Best Characters Ever, commenting "We’d say that Alley Mills’ off-kilter alter ego was the antithesis of her ball-busting older sibling... except for the fact that, sans her meds, Eric’s sweet-hearted sister-in-law was the sorta nutso from whom you’d be reluctant to accept so much as a lemon bar."
