= Justin Barber =

- The Bold and the Beautiful character
- Portrayed by: Aaron D. Spears
- Duration: 2009–2022, 2024–present
- First appearance: September 14, 2009
- Created by: Bradley Bell
- Introduced by: Bradley Bell
In-universe information
- Occupation: Businessman
- Family: Barber
- Father: Wesley Barber
- Mother: Valerie Lowell
- Wife: Donna Logan (2011)
- Sons: Marcus Forrester
- Granddaughters: Rosie Forrester
- Uncles: Walter Barber
- Nieces: Emma Barber
- First cousins: Olivia Barber Winters; Drucilla Barber Winters

Justin Barber is a fictional character on the American soap opera, The Bold and the Beautiful. The show has focused especially on Justin's stressful and awkward relationship with his son, Marcus, and on his equally strained relationship with Marcus's mother, Donna Logan, whom he eventually marries.

The character, who first appeared in 2009, is played by Aaron D. Spears. In July 2010, Spears was demoted to a recurring cast member, making appearances until April 2011, at such time he was re-upped to a regular. Starting with April 2012, he was once again demoted to recurring status, making sporadic appearances. In October 2017, Spears returned to regular status. Two years later, it was announced that Spears had been demoted to recurring status.

== Storylines ==
Justin, the executive vice president of mergers and acquisitions for Spencer Publications, was summoned by his boss and confidant Bill Spencer, Jr. to his side in LA, in Bill's bid to wrestle the struggling Forrester Creations from the Forresters. Shortly after the takeover, while enjoying a cocktail with Bill and Katie Logan, Bill informed Justin that Katie's sister Donna would be joining them and Justin was shocked to see that Bill had meant Donna Logan, Justin's high school sweetheart who had disappeared from his life mysteriously years ago. Justin was talented basketball player in high school and in college on the East Coast with the ability to go into the NBA according Bill. He suffered a career ending knee injury that required five surgeries and doctors said he's be lucky to walk. Justin recovered and refocused his competitive nature from basketball to business working his way to becoming Bill Spencer, Jr.'s right hand man. After the awkward evening together, Donna confided in Katie that Justin was the father of her son, Marcus, who shared a close relationship with Donna's new husband, Eric Forrester. After agonizing over the decision of whether or not to tell Justin about Marcus, Donna decided to keep silent about the matter, but Justin quickly learned all about Donna's African-American son, and, after an intense confrontation with Donna, learned he was Marcus' father. In November 2009, Justin demanded that Donna let him know his son, and Donna reluctantly agreed. It was in November that Justin also began producing an ambitious new fashion talk show, The Catwalk, and, in an obvious attempt to get close to Donna again, invited her to become the host, a position which she would share along with Pam Douglas.

In December 2009, Justin, noticing sexual tension between Bill and Steffy Forrester, warned his friend that Steffy was only after him to win back Forrester Creations for her father, and that many other powerhouses had fallen from grace after falling victim to a seductive woman over the course of history. Justin also made an appealing offer to Donna, offering to relieve her stress from work by taking her on a romantic getaway. In February 2010, Justin offered Bill, whose stress continued to build because of Steffy Forrester's plotting, a friend to talk to, only for Bill to rudely dismiss him. A few months later, Justin returned to aid Bill in a bold attempt to take back a portion of Forrester Creations by capitalizing on Donna and Eric Forrester's marriage woes after the suspicious drowning of Donna's mother, Beth Logan. On the behalf of Spencer Publications, Justin wrote up a list of demands in Donna's name, which included 12.5% of Eric's 25% share of Forrester Creations, which she later got thanks to Bill. After delivering the letter to Bill, Justin comforted Donna and reminded her that he was still interested in rekindling his relationship with her. She hasn't decided yet if that's what she wants right now at the moment due to her divorce from Eric. Most recently, he upset his boss, Bill, when he decided to tamper with Steffy's presentation by exposing his sister-in-law Brooke's affair with Oliver Jones in order to cause a scandal at Forrester which Justin hoped would benefit Spencer Publications.

Justin and Donna rekindle their relationship after many years and talk about many things. Donna even gets teary-eyed when she talks about Marcus and why giving him up for adoption was the best decision for all involved. Justin is understanding of her. In February 2011, Donna and Justin married. Justin's cousin, Olivia, was a guest at the wedding, confirming his relation to the Barber/Winters family of The Young and the Restless. In November of that year, they divorced for personal reasons feeling they aren't like a married couple. They remain friends as well as loving parents to Marcus and loving grandparents to their granddaughter, Rosie Barber Forrester. In 2018 Justin's niece, Emma, began an internship at Forrester Creations.
