= Ridge Forrester =

Fictional character

- The Bold and the Beautiful character
- Thorsten Kaye as Ridge Forrester
- Portrayed by: Ronn Moss (1987–2012); Lane Davies (1992); Thorsten Kaye (2013–present); Aaron Phypers (2020)
- Duration: 1987–present
- First appearance: March 23, 1987
- Created by: William J. Bell
- Introduced by: William J. Bell (1987); Bradley Bell (2013); Michele Val Jean and Tracey Thomson (2025) (Note: In addition to Michele Val Jean and Tracey Thomson, other executive producers for Beyond the Gates include Sheila Ducksworth, Kimberly Doebereiner, Anna Saalfeld, Julie Hanan Carruthers, Leon W. Russell, and Derrick Johnson.)
- Book appearances: Blindsided By Love (2014); Dangerous Love (2014)
- Crossover appearances: Beyond the Gates
In-universe information
- Occupation: Businessman
- Family: Forrester; Marone
- Parents: Massimo Marone; Stephanie Forrester
- Stepparents: Eric Forrester
- Siblings: Thorne Forrester; Nick Marone; Kristen Forrester; Felicia Forrester; Angela Forrester; Diana Carter; Marcus Forrester (adoptive)
- Spouse: Caroline Spencer Forrester (1990); Taylor Hayes (1992–1995, 1998–2006); Brooke Logan (1994–1995, 1998, 2003–2004, 2004–2005, 2009, 2009–2011, 2012, 2018–2022, 2025–present); Caroline Spencer (2015–2016); Shauna Fulton (2020)
- Children: Thomas Forrester; Phoebe Forrester; Steffy Forrester; R.J. Forrester
- Grandchildren: Douglas Forrester; Kelly Spencer; Hayes Finnegan
- Grandparents: Massimo Marone III; John Douglas; Ann Douglas
- Aunts and uncles: John Forrester (legal); Pamela Douglas
- Nieces and nephews: Zende Forrester Dominguez (adoptive); Alexandria Forrester; Dino Damiano

Ridge Forrester is a fictional character from The Bold and the Beautiful, an American soap opera on the CBS network. The character was introduced in the series premiere on March 23, 1987, and has been a regular fixture ever since. Ronn Moss played the role from the beginning, and was one of four remaining original cast members after 25 years, along with Susan Flannery, John McCook and Katherine Kelly Lang. During a leave of absence in 1992, Moss was briefly replaced by Lane Davies. The character's fate was uncertain when Moss departed the role in 2012, although head-writer Bradley Bell confirmed in an interview with Michael Logan of TV Guide that he had plans for a recast should Moss choose not to return to the series. In October 2013, TV Guide's Michael Logan reported that the role of Ridge was recast with former All My Children actor, Thorsten Kaye. Kaye made his first appearance as Ridge on December 13, 2013. Due to the COVID-19 pandemic, Denise Richards' husband Aaron Phypers appeared as Ridge in intimate scenes with Shauna Fulton in 2020. In October 2025, the character appeared in a crossover with Beyond the Gates.

Kaye's performance has been met with critical acclaim, garnering him two Daytime Emmy Award wins for Outstanding Lead Actor in a Drama Series consecutively in 2023 and 2024, and receiving further nominations in the category in 2020, 2021, and 2026.

== Development ==
=== Characterization ===
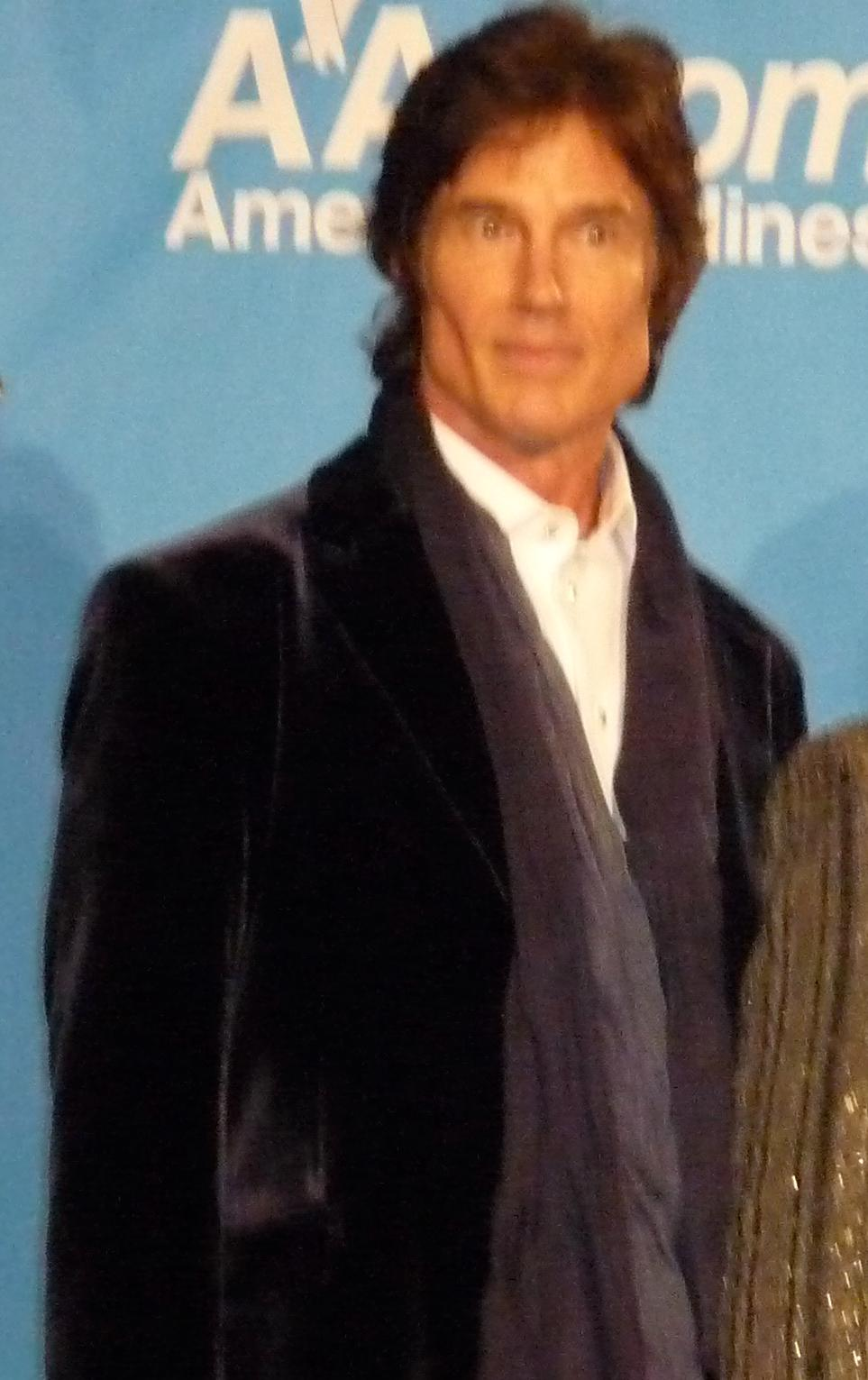
Actor Ronn Moss originated the role of Ridge, portraying the role for twenty-five years, from 1987 until his departure in 2012.

Ridge Forrester is described as: "Currently CEO and the driving force behind Forrester Creations Empire. His biggest fan is Mick, Ridge is this debonair designer spent his entire life believing that he was Eric’s biological son, only to later learn that he’s not biologically Eric's son at all, but rather the son of shipping tycoon Massimo Marone, and half brother to sailor, Nick, but that never changed the FACT that he is a Forrester legally and will always be a Forrester. He is father to Thomas, Steffy, and RJ, and stepfather to Hope, the one-time conflicted lover has finally settled down with Brooke, the true love of his life." In December 2013 during an interview with TV Guide, executive producer Bradley Bell talked about a significant change in Ridge's personality following the recasting of the role. He described, "He's become very introspective about the first chapter of his life, and the highs and lows of being married to a woman like Brooke. He's been working, traveling, keeping a low profile and really trying to analyze himself and the mistakes he's made. He's been thinking a lot about what he wants for the remainder of his life."

=== Departure and recast ===
In August 2012, it was announced that Moss had decided to leave The Bold and the Beautiful after 25 years of being on the series. He left the series on September 14, 2012. When approached about the possibility of a recast following Moss' exit, series executive producer Bradley Bell confessed, "I might go a little younger but we'll be true to the age range that's been established. I do have people in mind in terms of a recast – some very interesting people." Bell also revealed that the character would return at some point in the future, whether it was Moss portraying the role or not. He revealed:

Right now I can only tell you this: Ridge will not be dead or presumed dead. He will just not be in the picture. I don't want to do a presumed death because I don't want the story that follows to be all about Ridge. This will be a Brooke story. Ridge is a pivotal part of the show and he will be back in a matter of time... and probably not all that much time [sic] There will be a period of time without Ridge, which is where some new, interesting avenues for Brooke will come into play. But at some point it will be necessary for Ridge to return to the show. Who will be playing the role at that point remains to be seen.

Bell later announced he would recast the role, should Moss choose not to return, and had several high-profile actors in mind. On October 15, 2013, it was announced that former All My Children star Thorsten Kaye was recast in the role of Ridge. He made his on-screen debut on December 13, 2013. Bradley Bell explained that Kaye was at the top of his list for a Ridge recast and even considered bringing him to the series prior to the recast. He said, "I've had Thorsten on a list of several possible Ridges for a long time. Some of the actors on that list came from daytime, others had never done daytime before." In September 2025, it was announced Kaye would crossover to Beyond the Gates as Ridge.

== Storylines ==
=== 1987–2012 ===
Ridge Forrester is the son of Eric and Stephanie Forrester (until a 2001 storyline changes his paternity), the oldest of the five Forrester children: Thorne, Kristen, Felicia and Angela. He is initially portrayed as an arrogant playboy who fully enjoys his status as the favored son. Yet, like Eric, Ridge is a talented designer and soon becomes a central part of the family company, fashion house Forrester Creations. He dates the virginal heiress, Caroline Spencer. They fall in love and set a wedding date, but right before the wedding, Caroline finds out Ridge had a last minute fling and she collapsed at the wedding. Ridge didn't realize he really loved Caroline until she breaks up with him. She went on to marry his brother Thorne and Ridge ventured into a romance with Brooke Logan. Ridge moved Brooke in with him, she became pregnant but miscarried their child. During her recuperation, Ridge went into an inebriated Caroline's bedroom while her husband Thorne was downstairs and had sex with Caroline. Caroline thought he was Thorne but much later "confessed" she knew it was Ridge. Caroline and Ridge still loved each other. Caroline finally left Thorne and went to Ridge, Ridge broke up with Brooke, and they were married. Caroline died after being diagnosed with leukemia. Caroline’s dying wish is for Ridge to be with Brooke, the two reunite. Riddled with guilt Ridge seeks counsel from Taylor Hayes, a beautiful psychiatrist who counseled Ridge upon Caroline’s death. Ridge and Taylor are attracted to each other. This results in Brooke instantly clashing with Taylor, as Brooke cannot believe that Ridge could love another woman. Ridge waffles between the two women for a while but ultimately decides to marry Taylor. They wed in a beautiful ceremony which Brooke attempted to stop to make the announcement that she is pregnant. Brooke is unsure about the father of the baby since she had slept with both Ridge and Eric, Ridge’s father. Ridge was declared the father after a paternity test. While Brooke wanted Ridge to raise her baby with her and leave Taylor, Ridge chose to honor his marriage and stay with Taylor.

By the time Taylor is presumed dead in a plane crash, Brooke is engaged to Taylor's associate, James Warwick. Ridge initially encourages their relationship, but he ends up crashing their wedding. He and Brooke soon marry instead. Taylor was rescued by Prince Omar and married him. When Taylor turns up alive, Ridge initially chooses to stay with Brooke because of the children, but goes back to his true wife (his marriage to Brooke was ruled invalid). This sets in motion a bitter rivalry between Brooke and Taylor. In an attempt to make Ridge jealous, Brooke threatens to elope with Grant, an old friend of Taylor's who has come to work at Forrester Creations, if Ridge doesn't agree to remarry her. When Ridge refuses, she goes through with the wedding, not knowing that Ridge left Taylor at their engagement party to race to the port to try to stop her from marrying Grant. She also gives Grant control of Forrester Creations. When her son Rick shoots Grant, Ridge takes the blame and while waiting to be sentenced, he spills his heart to Taylor confessing it was her he always loved. When Ridge is released, Taylor is pregnant. However, when she goes to tell him she is pregnant, she catches Brooke and Ridge in bed, she decides to tell everyone Thorne, who she has been living with, and went on vacation to Hawaii, is the father. Taylor didn't know that Brooke staged the scene, getting Ridge drunk and out of his shirt and he still refused to make love to her. The truth about Thomas Forrester in fact being Ridge's son comes out, and he annuls his marriage to Brooke and returns to Taylor. In 1999, identical twin daughters, Steffy and Phoebe, are born.

Several ordeals undermine his happiness during the marriage. His old lover, Morgan DeWitt, tricks him into getting her pregnant. A physical confrontation with Taylor leads to Morgan miscarrying, which in turn leads to her kidnapping Steffy, faking the child's death and passing the girl off as her own. Morgan eventually has both Taylor and the child held captive; but Ridge manages to save them both. Taylor is killed by Eric's ex wife, Sheila Carter. Ridge also learns he isn't Eric's son, but the son of billionaire shipping magnate Massimo Marone (even Stephanie didn't know this), Stephanie's best friend. Ridge returns to Brooke. When Ridge, Brooke and series newcomer Nick Marone are kidnapped by Sheila, Ridge falls into a fire furnace, and presumed dead. A grieving Brooke collapsed in front of the furnace and Nick "comforted" her by having sex with her, on the foundry floor! However Ridge is actually alive, returning three days later. She gives birth to R.J. Forrester, Ridge's child (originally thought to be Nick's child, later revealed as Ridge's). Brooke tosses between Nick (who she now loves) and Ridge. She chooses Nick in the end.

Brooke returns to Ridge, but he leaves her for Taylor, who returned from the dead; In reality, she was kidnapped by Prince Omar to recover from her wounds. Stephanie faked a heart attack, and convinced Ridge to marry Taylor as her "dying" wish. When her lies were exposed. Ridge chooses to stay with Taylor in spite of being manipulated by his mother. Taylor tells Ridge the truth about her sleeping with James Warwick many years ago while married to Ridge. Ridge tells her that the hypocrisy of the standard she has always held others, namely Brooke, up to is what he can't forgive. So Ridge returns to Brooke, however she rejects him, choosing Nick instead. When Nick and Brooke marry, Ridge suffers from a heart attack, literally a broken heart, according to his diagnosis. Stephanie realizes and accepts that Ridge really does love Brooke. Brooke returns to L.A after leaving to support Ridge, however remains with Nick. Ridge dated Brooke's sister, Donna, hoping Brooke will be jealous.

After Bridget and Nick sleep together, Brooke wants Ridge back, however he rejects her; he has his eye on the new chemist at Forrester Originals, Ashley Abbott (a character who had been well established years earlier on The Young and the Restless). They have a brief relationship, and engage however he breaks it off to be with Brooke again after Brooke is savagely beaten and raped by Andy. Brooke leans on Ridge, who is very supportive and goes to counseling with her. When a man named Shane McGrath dies, Ridge took Shane's body out on Nick's boat, The Shady Marlin, and dumped it in the ocean. Ridge is blamed (despite not killing Shane). He is jailed and released. Rick ends up in a relationship with Taylor, however Taylor breaks it off as she still loves Ridge. This results in a fist-fight between Ridge and Rick. Rick falls off a building and ends up paralyzed. In 2009, Ridge and Taylor becoming close again after their daughter Phoebe is killed in a car accident, in a car which Rick was driving. They protect their daughter, Steffy from Rick after she shows interest in him as well. Steffy and Rick break up. Taylor gives Ridge pills for stress, however he starts to overdose himself without Taylor's knowledge; Taylor gets in bed with him and they have sex. He leaves Brooke and he's ready to marry Taylor. Steffy and Thomas send texts to Brooke, misleading her about the wedding. But at the last minute Brooke interrupts the ceremony, arriving on a horse, and, after a short period, Ridge leaves Taylor's house and reunites with Brooke. In 2010, at Hope's graduation party where all the females are dressed alike and all the males are dressed alike and are wearing masks, Brooke has sex with Oliver Jones, Hope Logan's teenage boyfriend. Oliver thinks Brooke is Hope. Hope is angry with both of them and dumps Oliver. Ridge pardons Brooke and doesn't react at all. In 2011, Taylor's and Ridge's son, Thomas, set out to promote their Forrester Creations Line called "Taboo" but end up in a plane crash and get stranded on an island. They return, and Taylor consumes poisonous berries that are brought back, assumed to trigger a sexual anxiety when consumed. Stephanie promises Thomas her shares of Forrester creation at her death if he will lie, so Thomas and Stephanie lie and tell everyone that Thomas and Brooke had sex on the Island. Ridge returned to Taylor, and nearly married her because of this. The truth came out and he returned to Brooke and basically disowned his son, Thomas. He left Taylor heartbroken and she is now dating Thorne. Also Ridge is stunned when he learns that his daughter Steffy married Hope's fiancee Liam Spencer in Aspen. Despite whatever doubts he may have about the marriage, Ridge supports his daughter's decision to marry Liam while Brooke doesn't. When Liam ends his marriage to Steffy and reunites with Hope, Ridge expresses his personal concerns while Brooke is happy that her daughter is finally with the man she loves. Ridge proposes to Brooke in Italy. Stephanie offers to organise the wedding at her house; it was a simple ceremony with only family as guests. Ridge and Brooke leave for their honeymoon after the speeches have taken place. While on their honeymoon, Brooke is in touch with Deacon via one text concerning Hope, and Ridge finds out, but when he asks Brooke about it, she denies it. Ridge tells Brooke he can no longer take the lies and tells her he will not be returning home with her. Brooke arrives home without Ridge to deal with Katie. Ridge leaves his son Thomas in charge of Forrester Creations as interim CEO.

=== 2013–present ===
Ridge (Thorsten Kaye) returns to L.A. in December 2013 and reconnects with Brooke, but breaks things off when he learns of her affair with Bill Spencer, Jr. Katie, Brooke's youngest sister, thought she was going to die, but was going through postpartum psychosis. She wanted Brooke to take care of Bill and Will, so arranged circumstances for Brooke and Bill to fall in love and raise Baby Will together. Everyone blames Brooke's affair with Bill on Ridge leaving Brooke on their honeymoon and spending one year away in Paris. Brooke and Ridge decide to remarry, but Katie and Ridge have connected and have feelings for each other. Katie fakes a fainting spell at the wedding. Ridge begins dating Brooke's sister Katie Logan, which angers a jealous Brooke and Eric, who wants Ridge and Brooke together. Eric tells Ridge that if he breaks up with Katie and gets together with Brooke he will appoint Ridge CEO of Forrester Creations. Eric makes Brooke and Ridge co-vice presidents with Rick still serving as president. Katie and Ridge become engaged and Bill seizes the opportunity for another chance with Brooke. Bill and Brooke travel to Abu Dhabi for their marriage, which is stopped by Ridge when he learns of Bill's one night stand with Quinn Fuller. An enraged Bill orders his right hand man Justin Barber, who was secretly piloting the helicopter Ridge and Brooke were on, to dump Ridge into the Persian Gulf. After an extensive search Brooke finds Ridge on the beach but he has suffered memory loss and has lost the ability to draw. Ridge blames Bill for his loss of drawing but finds that he is learning to draw again by working with Rick's wife and Bill's niece Caroline Spencer. Eric says he will step down as CEO to travel more with his brother John and will decide on a successor between Ridge and Rick. As Caroline and Ridge work together alone on the new couture line they share a few kisses and declare their attraction for each other. Katie becomes jealous of Caroline's ability to understand Ridge and help him draw again but tells Ridge not to use Caroline to attain the CEO position. Eric chooses Ridge as the new CEO but changes his mind when he learns about Ridge and Caroline kissing. During a business meeting, Maya told everyone that Ridge and Caroline were having an affair. Though Caroline is crying and begging for Rick's forgiveness, Ridge stands quietly. Rick is angered and hurt and begins an affair with the greedy and opportunistic Maya Avant, who convinces Rick to accept the CEO position. Rick uses his new role as CEO to enact revenge on Ridge and Caroline. Ridge and Katie's relationship is strained and a vengeful Katie tells Bill, who gets into a fight with Ridge. Caroline wants to have a relationship with Ridge but he tells her to work things out with Rick. Eric orders Rick to end his affair with Maya or he will fire him as CEO. Rick devises a scheme where it appears he has returned to Caroline until he is secure in his position at Forrester Creations. However, Rick continues his affair with Maya until he was able to gain irrevocable control of the company from Eric. Once he achieves this, he leaves Caroline and moves Maya into the Forrester Mansion, and replaces Stephanie's portrait above the fireplace with one of Maya. Rick finds Ridge and Caroline making out with each other in the design office and shoots at them with a gun that he stole from Eric. Eric, finally realizes Rick is dangerous and unstable, uses the morality clause in Rick's contract to fire Rick and make Ridge CEO. Katie then breaks off her engagement with Ridge as his relationship with Caroline progresses.

Caroline takes a trip to New York to visit Karen and Danielle, and is severely injured when she is hit by a car. Upon returning to L.A., she moves in with Ridge and they begin to plan their future. He helps her to recuperate. However, Ridge finds out that he cannot father children as a result of an irreversible vasectomy he had while living in Paris, and ends his relationship with Caroline so that she can find someone who can give her children. Ridge does not tell Caroline about his inability to father children, and instead confides in Brooke. Caroline then takes anti-anxiety medication that she stole from Pam's desk and starts drinking. While drunk and drugged in a hotel room, she calls Thomas (now played by Pierson Fodé), and they have sex. The next morning, after realizing what happened, Caroline returns to Ridge. A few weeks later, Caroline finds out she is pregnant, and Ridge tells her that he can't be the father. Caroline then confesses to having sex with Thomas and he is her baby's father. Caroline and Ridge decide to keep the baby's paternity a secret as Ridge believes that Thomas took advantage of Caroline and is too immature to raise a child. The baby is born, and they decide to name him Douglas, after Stephanie. Thomas begins bonding with Douglas, and Ridge and Caroline eventually reveal the truth after being blackmailed by Brooke and Bill. Ridge then ends his marriage to Caroline so that Thomas, Caroline, and Douglas can be a family.

Ridge then decides to go after Brooke, despite the fact that she is in a relationship with Bill. Ridge then stops Brooke and Bill's attempted wedding after R.J. (now recast and aged to 16) returns home from boarding school and convinces Ridge that he belongs with Brooke. Ridge and Brooke eventually reunite and get engaged when Ridge proposes on Christmas Day, 2016. Despite being recommitted to Brooke, Ridge starts to develop feelings for Eric's new wife Quinn Fuller, after he accidentally sees her naked while taking an outdoor shower. When Ridge tries to get Quinn out of Eric's life for ruining Steffy and Liam's life by massaging her sprained foot, being in a steam room together, and having her in a compromising situation at a hotel out of the country. Quinn quickly learns of Ridges plan and threatens to expose him to Eric, however when Quinn tells Ridge of her childhood and why she was so mad at the world, Ridge understands her, and kisses her. Ridge and Quinn would continue to have an affair behind Brooke and Eric's back. Katie then becomes suspicious of Quinn and Ridge, and tells Brooke about her suspicions. Brooke doesn't believe Katie, and goes to look for Ridge and catches him kissing Quinn. Brooke calls off their engagement, and goes back to Bill and marries him.

Sheila Carter returns to L.A after being accused of trying to kill Quinn. Sheila with the help of Charlie learns of Ridge and Quinn's affair and tells Eric. Ridge and Quinn confesses to Eric on their affair and Eric kicks Quinn and Ridge out the mansion. When Steffy demanded Ridge tell her what he did to Eric, Ridge reveals to Steffy about him and Quinn. Steffy asks Ridge if he is in love with Quinn, Ridge tells his daughter that he is not, and that he hopes that Eric does not divorce Quinn. When Ridge visits Eric at a motel, he tells Ridge that he his no longer is son and that he betrayed him again but later forgives Ridge. Brooke talks to Ridge about divorcing Bill and that she has seen his true colors. Brooke never tells Ridge that she left him for burning down Spectra, but tells him that he punched Liam. Ridge works to get Brooke to take him back but has competition, when his young brother Thorne (Ingo Rademacher) who returns from Paris, and wants Brooke and his CEO position. However Ridge wins Brooke back after Bill signs the divorce papers, and marries her at the Forester mansion, and has Thorne as his best man.

== Reception ==
In his column of the newspaper Gettysburg Times on January 10, 1990, John N. Goudas discussed Ridge: "You have to hand it to Ridge Forrester. That handsome devil on The Bold and the Beautiful. In love with two women, Caroline and Brooke, he played a stalling game for 3 years, and got away with it. In December (1989) the writers finally cleared up Ridge's conscience and finally made a decision in favor of Caroline, the unhappy wife of his brother Thorne," not knowing that after years of turmoil Brooke would emerge as his true love (even after another woman, Taylor Hayes, had a life with Ridge). Ronn Moss said on his character (in the very early stages) "Ridge has developed since the show began. He is less devious, and more respectful than others. Besides, he had a problem that was uncommon; he was in love with two ladies." Connie Passalacqua from The Rock Hill Herald said at the show's inception: "Even the most hardened feminist would swoon at the sight of Ronn Moss, Ridge Forrester [...] Ridge has been shown at various angles, sunning his ripply muscled bod by the Forrester swimming pool". Passalacqua also commented on the character's looks and touching on the beauty and good looks of the show's cast, embodying the title Bold and Beautiful at its very best.

In November 2003, whilst discussing the current storylines and characters of The Bold and the Beautiful, Nancy M. Reichardt from the Edmonton Journal opined that the reveal that Ridge was Massimo's biological son put a "devastating story in motion". In 2022, Charlie Mason from Soaps She Knows placed Ridge at #7 on his ranked list of The Bold and the Beautiful's Best of the Best Characters Ever, commenting that "Whether he was being played by Ronn Moss or Thorsten Kaye, the dressmaker, to borrow a diss from the character at No. 6 [Bill], has always been in vogue as far as we — and the ladies of L.A. — have been concerned."
