= Marcus Forrester =

- The Bold and the Beautiful character
- Portrayed by: Texas Battle
- Duration: 2008–13
- First appearance: May 14, 2008
- Last appearance: October 17, 2013
- Created by: Bradley Bell
In-universe information
- Other names: Marcus Walton; Marcus Logan; Marcus Barber; Marcus Walton Forrester; Marcus Barber Forrester; Marcus Logan Forrester; Marcus Logan Barber; Marcus Walton Barber; Marcus Barber Walton
- Occupation: Executive at Forrester Creations
- Family: Barber; Logan; Forrester (adoptive); Walton (adoptive)
- Father: Justin Barber; Jerry Walton (adoptive); Eric Forrester (adoptive)
- Mother: Donna Logan
- Half-brothers: Carter Walton (adoptive); Ridge Forrester (adoptive); Thorne Forrester (adoptive); Rick Forrester (adoptive)
- Half-sisters: Angela Forrester (adoptive); Kristen Forrester (adoptive); Felicia Forrester (adoptive); Bridget Forrester (adoptive)
- Wife: Dayzee Leigh (2012–)
- Daughters: Rosie Forrester
- Grandfathers: Wesley Barber; Stephen Logan
- Grandmothers: Valerie Lowell; Beth Logan
- Uncles: Storm Logan
- Aunts: Brooke Logan; Katie Logan
- First cousins: Rick Forrester; Bridget Forrester; Hope Logan; R.J. Forrester; Jack Marone; Will Spencer; Flo Fulton; Ivy Forrester (adoptive); Emma Barber; Jessica Forrester (adoptive)

Marcus Forrester is a fictional character from the American CBS soap opera, The Bold and the Beautiful, portrayed by Texas Battle. He first appeared on May 14, 2008. In early stages of his storyline, it was revealed he was the long-lost son of Donna Logan (Jennifer Gareis) and his father, Justin Barber (Aaron D. Spears) was introduced to the serial after Marcus. He has had relationships with Steffy Forrester and has fathered Amber Moore's child in 2011.

== Characterisation ==
Marcus is described as "Smooth, suave, and oh so charming, ladies’ man, Marcus Forrester never fails to make women swoon".

== Storylines ==
Marcus is first introduced attending the funeral of Storm Logan. After his arrival, he begins working at Forrester Creations. He is revealed to be the son of Donna Logan and Justin Barber and is later adopted by Eric Forrester during Donna's marriage to Eric. Marcus explains that the Waltons were good to him but he never felt that he connected with them emotionally. Saying that "they just want him to be happy", they let go of their parental rights which permits him to be adopted by wealthy Eric.

Eric gives Marcus a position at Forrester Creations in the shipping department, working with Eric's granddaughter Steffy. Steffy and Marcus instantly click, and begin to date. Donna warns Marcus to be cautious of Steffy. The Unstable Pam Douglas (Steffy's great-aunt) convinces Steffy to spy on Marcus, which she does. When Steffy learns the truth about Marcus being Donna's child, she is angry about him not telling her. Later Marcus becomes head of shipping at the company, becoming Steffy's boss, complicating their relationship after Donna fires Steffy's entire family. Despite being Steffy's boss, he is still deeply in love with her. Marcus finally wises up to Owen's conniving and manipulation of his mother and confronts him. Ridge tells Marcus to stay away from Steffy, his daughter. Marcus tries to break it off with her, but she still loves him and they had a wonderful time at Bikini Beach.

Marcus later remembers that Eric had been given a bottle of gin from Owen, and he had suspicions that something had been put in it.

When Marcus helps discover that Pamela Douglas poisoned Eric, this allows Ridge to relent in his opinion of Marcus, and allowed Steffy to continue seeing him, which overjoys her. However, Marcus becomes an accidental victim of Pamela, when she orders him to pick up a shipment, and he is attacked by a giant cobra, which was meant for his mother. Marcus continues his relationship with Steffy after recovering from his cobra bite. Steffy breaks up with him after becoming attracted to Rick. Marcus later dates Dayzee Leigh, a young woman who works with the homeless. However the relationship doesn't work out, and Dayzee later becomes involved with Steffy's older brother Thomas Forrester. She and Thomas end up breaking up, and Dayzee reunites with Marcus. Amber Moore gives birth to a baby girl. When a DNA test reveals that Marcus is the father, not Liam Spencer or Oliver Jones, it is revealed that he and Amber had a brief romance resulting in her pregnancy. They name their daughter Ambrosia Barber-Forrester and nickname her Rosie. Amber's attempts several times to start a relationship with Marcus but he has already reconciled with Dayzee instead. Amber eventually gives up on Marcus and offers her complete support for their relationship. Marcus and Dayzee became engaged and marry soon after. His happiness is short lived when he is accused of running over his friend, Anthony. However, with Caroline Spencer and her then-boyfriend, Thomas Forrester's help, Marcus is acquitted of the charge.

== Reception ==
For the role, Battle was nominated In 2009 and 2010 for an NAACP Image Award in the category of “Outstanding Actor in a Daytime Drama Series" for his portrayal of Marcus.
