= Eric Forrester =

B&B character since 1987

- The Bold and the Beautiful character
- Portrayed by: John McCook
- Duration: 1987–present
- First appearance: March 23, 1987
- Created by: William J. Bell
- Book appearances: Dangerous Love (2014)
- Crossover appearances: The Young and the Restless
In-universe information
- Occupation: Businessman; Fashion designer
- Family: Forrester
- Brothers: John Forrester
- Wife: Stephanie Forrester (1957–1990, 1999–2005, 2006–2008, 2012); Brooke Logan (1991–1993, 2005–2006); Sheila Carter (1993–1995); Donna Logan (2008–2010, 2024–present); Quinn Fuller (2016–2022)
- Sons: Ridge Forrester (legal); Thorne Forrester; Rick Forrester; Marcus Forrester (adoptive)
- Daughters: Angela Forrester; Kristen Forrester; Felicia Forrester; Bridget Forrester
- Grandsons: Thomas Forrester (legal); Zende Forrester Dominguez (adoptive); Dino Damiano; R.J. Forrester (legal); Logan Forrester Knight
- Granddaughters: Steffy Forrester (legal); Phoebe Forrester (legal); Alexandria Forrester; Rosie Forrester (adoptive); Lizzy Forrester
- Nephews: John Forrester Jr.
- Nieces: Jessica Forrester; Ivy Forrester
- Other relatives: Electra Forrester

Eric Forrester is a fictional character from the American CBS Daytime soap opera The Bold and the Beautiful, played by John McCook. He made his debut screen appearance on March 23, 1987, the show's first episode. The character appeared briefly on The Young and the Restless in 1993, 1995, 1996, 2005, 2008, 2013, 2017, and 2021. McCook had also played Lance Prentiss from 1976 to 1980. Eric is a famed fashion designer whom is known for his marriages to Stephanie Forrester. Over the years, he got divorced from Stephanie, and often he aroused her jealousy, when he had been involved with many other women, whom are listed as follows: Margo Lynley, Beth Logan, Brooke Logan, Sheila Carter, Taylor Hayes, Sally Spectra, Maggie Forrester, Lauren Fenmore, Jackie Marone, Donna Logan and Quinn Fuller.

== Backstory ==
Eric and his wife, Stephanie, are co-founders of the Los Angeles-based fashion house, Forrester Creations, with Eric as its lead designer. They have five children: Ridge, Thorne, Kristen, Felicia and Angela. Two different retcons have taken away two of his children. The Angela that Eric meets in 1988 proves to be an imposter who replaced the real Angela when she died in an accident years before. In 2001, it is revealed that his firstborn, Ridge, is the biological son of billionaire shipping magnate, Massimo Marone.

Forrester Creations was first started with a $100,000 loan from Stephanie's father, wealthy Florida businessman John Douglas, despite his disapproval of her marriage to Eric. The combination of Eric's designing talent and Stephanie's business acumen and connections made Forrester Creations a great success, both in prestige and profits. For a time, those profits are eaten away by a far less prestigious rival, Spectra Fashions, which makes knock-off fashions all too similar to Forrester designs.

== Storylines ==
Eric is struggling in his marriage to Stephanie. Eric declares the marriage "stale" while Stephanie blames their woes on his assistant, Margo Lynley, with whom she suspects he is having an affair. Stephanie inadvertently brings an actual "other woman" into his life when she hires a catering company which has employed the young, Beth Logan. After Eric meets Beth, Eric wants to resume their love affair from thirty years before. Another employee is Beth's daughter, Brooke, who later proves an even more serious rival for Eric's affections.

Eric eventually leaves his wife for Beth, but what brings him back to the Forrester home is the revelation that he has a 24-year-old daughter he never knew about: the microcephalic Angela. Stephanie had pretended she had had a stillbirth to spare Eric the pain of knowing his daughter was so severely disabled. Stephanie had hired a doctor to give Angela around-the-clock care in a secret house, never guessing that Angela would live until adulthood. It turns out the doctor, Todd Powell, had accidentally killed the real Angela years before. The daughter Eric meets is a perfectly functional imposter.

Other urgent matters—including the secret, withheld even from the partly amnesiac Thorne himself, that Thorne shot Ridge in the back of the head—keeps Eric home for a while. Stephanie's machinations, which bring Beth's estranged husband back in town, keep him out of that bed. But then his son, Ridge, and the publishing heiress, Caroline Spencer Forrester, discover the lies Brooke told to keep them apart and Caroline leaves Thorne for Ridge. Ridge ends his relationship with Brooke, and Eric is drawn to Brooke.

Eric offers comfort to a distraught and emotionally disturbed Brooke. Eric began to pursue and support Brooke, and she eventually becomes pregnant with Eric's child. They keep their affair quiet as Eric is in the middle of a divorce and was fearful of what Stephanie might do. Stephanie initially learns of the relationship through Thorne, stunning Stephanie who had no idea her husband and Brooke were even involved. Eric marries Brooke and they welcome their first child, Rick Forrester. Ridge and Brooke become close again and Brooke decides to divorce Eric to be with Ridge. She becomes pregnant with what she believes is Ridge's child, Bridget Forrester, but it is revealed years later that Eric is the father. Eric remains very affectionate and protective of Brooke.

In 2001, the shipping magnate, Massimo Marone, comes to town and woos Ridge's mother, Stephanie. Ridge opposes his efforts, and during a heated argument with him, cuts his hand deeply. This leads to a hospital visit and a doctor's discovery, divulged to Stephanie, that the blood types of Eric and Ridge make it impossible for them to be father and son. Stephanie reveals to Massimo that he is Ridge's father, conceived during a trip to Lake Geneva in their college days. The truth eventually comes out to both Eric and Ridge, and at first it puts an extra burden on the already strained relationship between them. Yet, despite the efforts of Eric's biological sons, Thorne and Rick—who exploit Ridge's lack of a biological tie to Eric—he continues to favor Ridge over the rest of his children.

In 2005, Eric divorces Stephanie when he finds out that she faked a heart attack. He returns to Brooke and they remarry, becoming co-CEOs of Forrester Creations and firing Stephanie. Stephanie later discovers a trust which her father had set up for her 40 years before which Eric kept hidden, making her sole owner of the company. She fires them as CEOs but rehires them as designers, consigned to a basement office. The pair divorce the following year and Eric returns to Stephanie.

Eric's marriage to Stephanie is strained again when he learns that her machinations to get rid of Brooke. This leads, by a circuitous route, to Eric and Donna Logan, Brooke's sister, becoming secret lovers. Eric's family are against this relationship, and scheme to keep them apart. Nick Marone, who now owns Forrester, makes divorcing Stephanie a condition of selling the company back to Eric. Stephanie prepares a more devious plot after she is shot and discovers who shot her: Donna's brother, Storm Logan. She conceals her knowledge that Donna and Brooke's brother, Storm Logan, shot her from the police on the condition that Donna leaves Eric. The schemes fail and Stephanie and Eric divorce, and he and Donna marry later that month.

Eric has a heart attack while having sex with Donna and falls into a coma. Donna has his power of attorney, thus making her acting CEO of Forrester Creations. As CEO, Donna gives promotions to Rick, Marcus Forrester (her newly rediscovered son, whom Eric adopts) and the mysterious Owen Knight; and she fires Ridge, Thorne and Felicia. Later, it is revealed that Eric was deliberately poisoned with potassium chloride, which was probably in the gin he drank just before his attack. Everyone is a suspect, including Owen Knight, who—out of unrequited love for Donna—confesses to the crime to take suspicion off her. But it turns out that Stephanie's sister, Pamela, poisoned Eric by giving him a potassium chloride-laced lemon bar. Her intention was only to weaken him and discredit Donna (thus avenging Stephanie) in the process.

Eric eventually recovers, but the schemes to break up his marriage continue apace. Donna gives her enemies ammunition by allowing Owen to kiss her. Just then, Eric—whom she thought was lost forever—is wheeled into the room and sees them. He eventually forgives her, but Thorne hires Donna and Owen lookalikes to make out in front of a secret camera (which a suspicious Eric himself had installed) in Owen's office. The truth eventually comes out, and Eric and Donna remain together.

At one point, Ridge thought Eric was lost forever, too. He even heard Eric's voice, begging his son to let him go. Ridge listens to this grief-induced hallucination and pulls the plug on Eric's breathing machine. After his recovery, Eric learns of this seeming treachery, which allows his younger son, Rick, to exploit this rift. Eventually, Eric fires Ridge and appoints Rick as President of the company. Later, Eric has a change of heart and steps down as CEO so that he can give the job to Ridge. The animosity between Rick and Ridge reaches new heights when Rick accidentally crashes his car and kills Phoebe. Rick manages to use even this situation as a means of exploiting Eric's pity. But he still is unable to get his way, which leads to him secretly stealing Forrester designs and giving them to Forrester's rival: Jackie M. Designs. Eric eventually forgives his son and resists efforts from Stephanie and others in the family to prosecute him for his crime.

Sales at Forrester are bad. The public hates the marriage between Eric and Donna. The company looks worse when Eric fires Stephanie, who ends up working at Jackie M. Designs, and still worse as Thorne and Felicia quit and Brooke takes a leave of absence. Pam sabotages the latest showcase by showering Donna—wearing the showstopper gown—with honey, both a reference to Brian De Palma's 1976 film, Carrie (in which the title character is showered with blood) and to Eric and Donna's well-known habit of using honey during sex play. All this—along Eric's use of illegal immigrants as employees—gives Bill Spencer Jr., the previously unknown illegitimate son of Eric's old rival Bill Spencer, the chance to take over the company. Bill's various efforts fail, until the Forresters are 30 minutes late on their bank loan. Bill pressures the banker to foreclose and sell him the company. The Forresters are furious, but Eric vows to win the company back. Ridge's daughter, Steffy, outsmarts and blackmails Bill into selling the company back to the clan. Eric, Stephanie, Ridge and Taylor Hayes (Steffy's mother) end up as equal co-owners of the company.

Eric objects when Donna hosts a talk show called The Catwalk, which is owned by Spencer Publications. Especially objectionable is how close this brings her to the Spencer employee, Justin Barber, Donna's ex-boyfriend and the father of Marcus. Their marriage is further strained after Stephanie has a fight with them, then leaves Donna's mother, Beth, who due to advance Alzheimer's and being alone, falls into and drowns in the Forrester swimming pool. Donna wants to press charges, but Eric refuses to let her. Donna realizes how strong the ties are between Eric and his ex-wife, and this realization leads to their divorce. When Stephanie proves to have stage-four cancer, Eric's love for her bubbles to the surface, and the two reunite.

Ridge's son, Thomas (by Taylor), wants to make his mark on the fashion industry with a new line called Taboo, which he promotes via scandal: he surprises Brooke on the runway with a kiss. His purpose is to exploit the public's fascination with his stepmother's pseudo-incestuous romances (with Ridge, Nick, Thorne and Eric), but Taylor worries that Thomas is genuinely attracted to Brooke. Eric supports the line, which leads to a clash with Ridge, who vehemently objects to it. At one point, Eric confesses to Ridge that he feels Taboo is payback: Thomas is doing to his father what Ridge did to his. Eric however, discounts the fact that Brooke was first Ridge's sweetheart, fiancée and almost the mother of his children after she had three miscarriages and fails to see that he should not have dated one of his son's ex-fiancées, let alone marry her.

The relationship between Eric and Stephanie falls into crisis when Eric asks his partner to have a physical approach because he feels a lack of affection, but Stephanie refuses because the Cancer makes her feel unattractive. Eric moves closer again to Jackie. Ridge finds out what is going on between Eric and Jackie and warns his father not to hurt Stephanie again. Eric decides to respect Stephanie's choice and goes back to her. The two again find happiness.

In March 2012, Eric and Stephanie remarry in the presence of Gladys Pope. That October, Doctor Lewis told Stephanie that her lung cancer has returned. Despite the desperate pleas of her family and friends, Stephanie refuses to accept treatment; she decided instead that she would like to enjoy her final days so Eric planned an Irish-themed party in her honor at the mansion. On November 26, 2012, Stephanie died of Cancer, lakeside at the Big Bear cabin.

After Stephanie's death, Eric feels alone and falls into a deep despair. Every evening, in fact Eric prepares two martinis and talks to his dead wife, and orders him to go ahead. The man can not stop looking for Stephanie everywhere: even though he left her many times in the past, she has never left him, so he had come to think that there would always have been and now does not know how to be able to accept that there is more. His family stands beside him, urging the man to focus on work. Eric discovers the existence of a change to the testament of Stephanie, the woman did not allow the company's future to be in the hands of Thomas, so he sent his shares to Eric, that regaining control was also legal, as well as patriarchal, trying to appease the feud between Thomas and Rick, finally deciding who is the worthy successor to Ridge through a fashion challenge judged by the same Eric. The latter chooses as the winner of his son Rick, sparking anger and disappointment in Thomas, elements that led him to decide to move to Paris. Although it is back to being at the head of Forrester, Eric, however, continues to feel the lack of his wife.

Eric finds himself surrounded by the love of three women, Pam, who shares his grief over the loss of her sister, Donna, who stands beside him and comforted him, and finally Taylor, who finds himself betrayed by Stephanie and once again frustrated by Brooke's children: on the one hand, there is Steffy that Liam impregnated, must wait for the choice of the latter and on the other, that Thomas wants to go to Paris. Eric begins to collect Taylor's confidences and he decides to help her. In fact, Eric's offer convinces Thomas to stay in Los Angeles by appointing him vice-president of Forrester Creations. Taylor is grateful to Eric and kisses him. The two spend much time together, getting closer and closer and sharing more kisses. Eric confides to Taylor the lack of intimacy between him and Stephanie, so Taylor promises to wear lingerie for him. Eric is happy again and feels not having to answer to anyone: in the past had already courted Taylor, but then he had always ignored the attraction because of Stephanie. But now Eric and Taylor feel as if not having to break the news to Stephanie saying that to go on is what the woman would want for them. During a private, romantic dinner, Taylor was wearing lingerie for Eric, but they are interrupted by Brooke, appalled, she discovers their relationship and accusing Taylor of using her new-found power to have influence over Eric's decisions at Forrester. That same evening, Eric and Taylor declare their feelings for one another, then they make love for the first time. When Taylor moves into the Forrester mansion, Brooke is determined to stop her. Eric and Taylor are happy together and Eric publicly announces his love for Taylor stating that he finally found happiness after Stephanie's death. The problems arrive when Brooke demands Eric marry her: she confesses to him that she is expecting Bill Spencer's child, her sister Katie's husband, and asks Eric to pretend to be the father because she does not want to create another scandal, but Eric refuses because he has a committed relationship with Taylor and he does not want to ruin their happiness. Brooke, however, does not give up and says she wants Eric back in her life. When Brooke suffers a miscarriage, she pleads with both Eric and Donna to keep it a secret from Katie, who both agree to do so. But Taylor finds out Brooke's secrets and, at Brooke's birthday party, she blurts out that Brooke had an affair with Bill. Eric and Taylor hit a snag in their blissful relationship over his keeping Brooke's secrets.

Thanks to the agreement between the Quinn Artisan Jewelers and Forrester Creations, Eric makes the acquaintance of Quinn Fuller with whom he begins a brief romance.

Eric welcomes his niece Ivy (Ashleigh Brewer), daughter of his brother John (Fred Willard) to Los Angeles and she and Quinn corroborate on a jewelry line.

Eric decides to appoint Ridge CEO, but the discovery of a clandestine kiss between Caroline and Ridge leads him to appoint Rick. After Rick behaves horribly as CEO and Eric refuses to remove him, Ridge, Liam and Steffy use their stock to take over the company. Ridge is CEO, Steffy is president and Bill's son, Liam, is vice-president. However, when Ridge reveals to everyone that Thomas is the father to Caroline's son Douglas and that he lied about being the father to protect Caroline, Eric asks Ridge to step down and retakes his position as CEO.

In 2016, Eric shocks his family when he reveals that he is dating Quinn Fuller. Ridge and Steffy disapprove of their relationship because of her recently kidnapping Liam, and her past history of hurting people. However, Eric defends Quinn against his family, and tells them that she has changed. Eric proposes to Quinn, and wants his family at his wedding to show signs of forgiveness. Eric is heartbroken because none of his family show up at his wedding, except for Ivy. Quinn refuses to marry Eric because of his family not showing up and not wanting him to ruin his relationship with his family. Eric tells her that he loves her, and that they are still getting married. Eric and Quinn marry, and Eric later confronts his family for staging a boycott and reminds them of all of the things that they have done but he forgave them for. Eric lashes out at his family, to the point where the stress of the situation causes Eric to collapse, due to a stroke. When Eric wakes up, he sees Quinn and is happy to see her. Eric learns that their marriage was invalid, but ended up remarried with the approval of Wyatt. Eric still hopes that his family would accept Quinn. Eric is happy that everyone is getting along with Quinn, especially Ridge. Eric's ex-wife Sheila Carter is in jail on suspicion of attempting to kill Quinn. Eric reminds Sheila that she hurt his family, and that he does not believe Sheila was indeed trying to kill Quinn. It was revealed that Deacon Sharpe was the one who tried to kill Quinn, due to drinking again and wanting revenge. Eric apologizes to Sheila for accusing her, and extends an olive branch. Sheila arrives at the mansion to tell Eric that Ridge and Quinn betrayed him, having an affair. Eric at first refuses to believe this, and is about to kick her out, when Ridge and Quinn arrive. Quinn and Ridge come clean about the fact that they kissed, only. Eric learns why Brooke called off her wedding with Ridge, and what she wanted to tell him in Australia, and that Katie knew. Eric kicks Ridge and Quinn out of the mansion, and goes to a motel, when Sheila tries to win him back. Steffy and Liam arrive and shoot Sheila, who would lie to the hotel staff about who shot her. Eric refuses to tell Steffy and Liam why he left the mansion. Ridge tracks Eric down at a motel, and Eric confronts him about betraying him, and disowns him as his son. Eric returns to the Forrester mansion, and confronts Quinn for her affair with Ridge. Eric serves Quinn divorce papers, and tells her that if she is really sorry, she will sign the divorce papers. Quinn signs then, and before she leaves Eric rips up the divorce papers. Eric forgives Quinn, and gives her a second chance. Later, Eric and Ridge talk at Forrester, and Eric forgives Ridge as well.

== Reception ==
For his portrayal of Eric, McCook was nominated for the Daytime Emmy Award for Outstanding Lead Actor in a Drama Series in 2001, 2012 and 2018. He won the award in 2022.

In 2022, Charlie Mason from Soaps She Knows placed Eric 16th on his ranked list of The Bold and the Beautiful's Best of the Best Characters Ever, commenting "Since the CBS soap's debut, John McCook hasn't just established the Forrester family's patriarch as a (much-needed) voice of reason, he's cemented his rep as a lady killer who earned his nickname of "honey bear" the fun way!"
