= Steffy Forrester =

Fictional character from The Bold and the Beautiful

- The Bold and the Beautiful character
- Jacqueline MacInnes Wood as Steffy Forrester
- Portrayed by: Cameryn McNabb (2002–2003); Jordan Mella (2004); Kylie Rae Tyndall (2004–2005); Alex Hoover (2005–2006); Jacqueline MacInnes Wood (2008–present); Kayla Ewell (2020–2021); (and other child actors)
- Duration: 1999–2006; 2008–2013; 2015–present
- First appearance: September 21, 1999
- Introduced by: Bradley Bell
- Book appearances: Forbidden Affair (2013); Second Chances (2014)
In-universe information
- Other names: Stephanie Forrester; Steffy Spencer; Steffy Finnegan
- Occupation: Businesswoman model
- Family: Forrester; Marone
- Father: Ridge Forrester
- Mother: Taylor Hayes
- Stepmother: Brooke Logan
- Brothers: Thomas Forrester
- Sisters: Phoebe Forrester
- Half-brothers: R.J. Forrester
- Husband: Liam Spencer (2011–2012, 2013, 2017–2018); Wyatt Spencer (2016–2017); John Finnegan (2021–present)
- Sons: Hayes Finnegan
- Daughters: Kelly Spencer
- Stepdaughters: Luna Nozawa
- Grandfathers: Massimo Marone; Jack Hamilton
- Grandmothers: Stephanie Forrester
- Aunts and uncles: Thorne Forrester; Nick Marone; Marcus Forrester (adoptive); Rick Forrester (adoptive); Felicia Forrester; Kristen Forrester; Bridget Forrester (adoptive); Angela Forrester; Diana Carter
- Nephews: Douglas Forrester
- First cousins: Aly Forrester; Zende Forrester Dominguez (adoptive); Dino Damiano; Jack Marone; Lizzie Forrester (adoptive); Logan Knight (adoptive)

Steffy Forrester is a fictional character from the American CBS soap opera The Bold and the Beautiful. Introduced by Bradley Bell, she is currently portrayed by Jacqueline MacInnes Wood. Steffy and her twin sister Phoebe (MacKenzie Mauzy) were born onscreen as the daughters of supercouple Ridge Forrester (Ronn Moss, later Thorsten Kaye) and Taylor Hayes (Hunter Tylo, later Krista Allen and Rebecca Budig) during the episode airing on September 21, 1999. For the character's first five-year period, she appeared as a minor. In 2005, Steffy was rapidly aged to a teenager, and in 2008 she appeared as an adult when Wood took over the role. Wood portrayed the role continuously until 2013, when she decided to leave her regular capacity with the series. Following a series of guest appearances, Wood returned as a series regular in 2015.

Steffy has suffered several losses throughout her life, which according to Wood is the reason for her deep-seated issues and puzzling storylines. Wood has also described the character as a "rich bitch". While characterized as being provocative and strong-willed, Steffy is emotionally starved on the inside due to her father's neglect. The character is known for her relationships with the Spencer men: Bill Spencer, Jr. (Don Diamont), Liam Spencer (Scott Clifton) and Wyatt Spencer (Darin Brooks) as well as animosities towards the Logan family, particularly her mother's rival Brooke Logan (Katherine Kelly Lang) and Steffy's own arch-rival Hope Logan (Kim Matula, later Annika Noelle). For several years, Steffy's storylines revolved around a long-running love triangle with Hope and Liam, before falling in love and entering a significant relationship with medical doctor, John "Finn" Finnegan (Tanner Novlan).

Soaps in Depth called Steffy the soap opera genre's "resident diva", while journalist Michael Logan referred to her as a "maddeningly complicated sexbomb". Wood's performance in the role received positive reviews from audiences and critics. She was nominated for the Daytime Emmy Award for Outstanding Younger Actress in a Drama Series in 2012 and 2013. In 2018, she was nominated for Outstanding Supporting Actress in a Drama Series, and won Outstanding Lead Actress in a Drama Series in 2019, 2021, and 2023.

== Casting ==
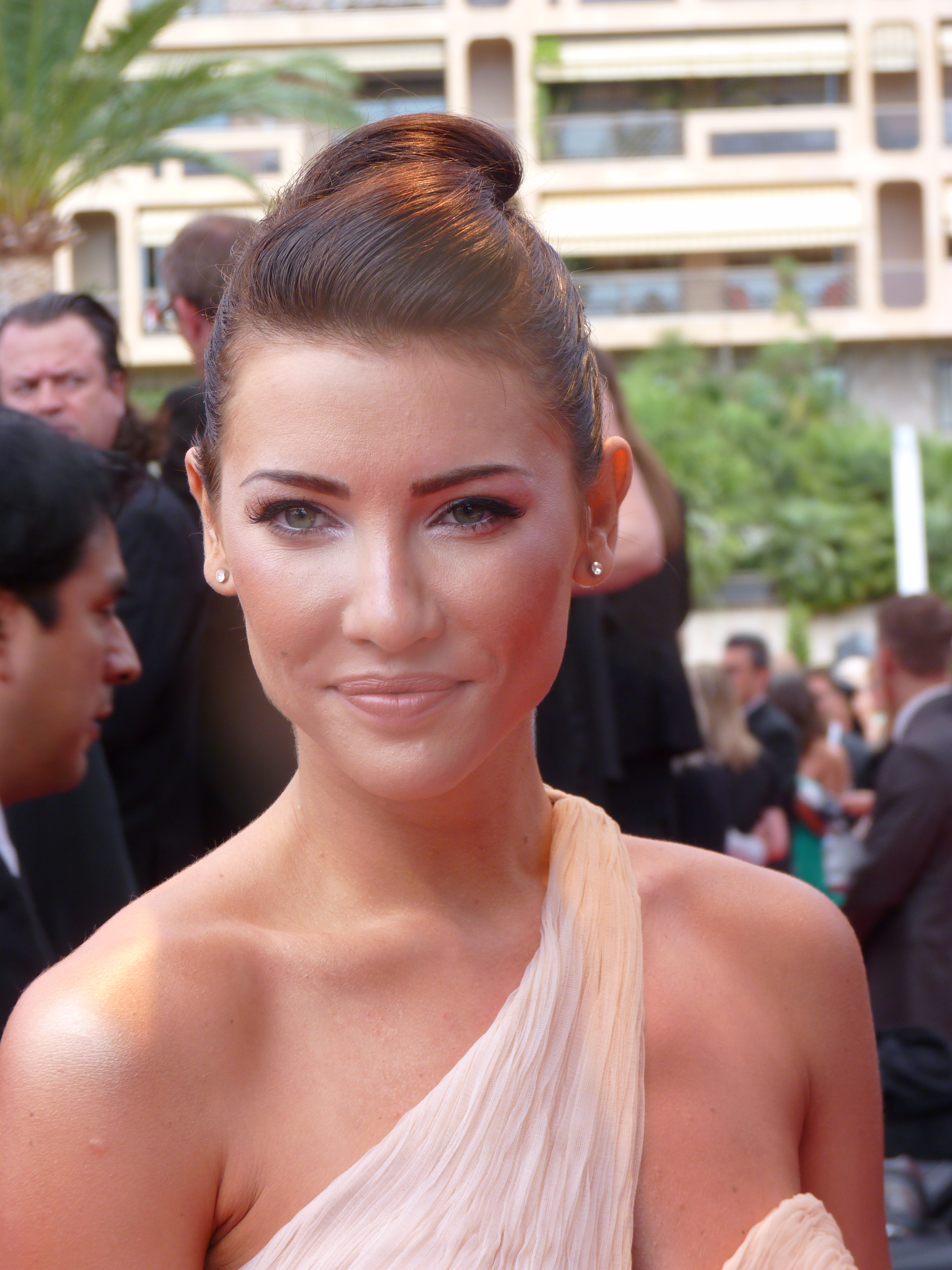
Jacqueline MacInnes Wood has portrayed Steffy since 2008.

From 1999 to 2003, Steffy and Phoebe were portrayed by various sets of identical twin child actors. Cameryn McNabb took over the role in 2003. From January to March 2004, Jordan Mella played Steffy. In April 2004, both roles were recast with Keaton and Kylie Rae Tyndall, and Steffy was rapidly aged. Kylie portrayed the role of Steffy until April 2005, when the role was recast with Alex Hoover, whose twin sister Addison Hoover took over the role of Phoebe. The Hoover twins were downgraded to recurring status in November 2005, and left the program the following year. In June 2006, former Guiding Light actress MacKenzie Mauzy took over the role of Phoebe upon the character's return, while Steffy was written out of the series.

Steffy was absent from the soap opera until June 4, 2008, when Canadian actress Jacqueline MacInnes Wood took over the part. With the casting of Wood, Phoebe and Steffy were retconned as fraternal twins. A month after Wood's arrival, Mauzy announced her exit from the show and Phoebe was killed off. Wood stated that she found the filming on the show to be very fast-paced, stating, "On the daily [show] we can shoot up to 90 pages, that's 8 to 12 episodes, in 4 days with sometimes no rehearsal! In films, you shoot 100 pages in 4 months."

In 2010, it was announced that Wood would take a brief break from the program to film the fifth installment in the Final Destination film series, Final Destination 5. Wood recorded several scenes in advance of her planned absence. Wood learned about her Daytime Emmy nomination just before filming a scene in the Adriatic Sea, stating, "I was just about to shoot a scene in the Adriatic sea in Italy. The water was only 54 degrees! [Executive Producer/Head Writer] Brad Bell came up to me and said, "How does it feel to be Emmy nominated?"

In May 2013, news broke that Wood had opted not to renew her contract with the show to take another break. According to Soaps in Depth, "[The producers] threw a lot of money at her to get her to stay, but she thought it was the right time to go". A representative for the show stated, "[Wood] is taking short a break, as she has done in the past, from B&B. She remains as the character of 'Steffy Forrester' and is continuing to tape, currently with episodes airing through July 2013 and then beyond". It was later announced that Wood had decided to remain with the series on a recurring basis with episodes airing on July 4 to 12 and September 30 and October 1.

After making sporadic appearances, Wood was then announced to be returning for several episodes from December 12 to 20, 2013. Last appearing on the credits in February 2014, it was confirmed in October 2014 that she would not be returning on a more permanent basis, stating: "Unfortunately we weren't on the same page contractually/scheduling etc (...) These things happen in this industry and I hope all my fans can understand that. I am a huge supporter of [executive producer/headwriter] Brad Bell and the entire cast and crew." Wood was also removed from the soap opera's opening credits.

However, on December 4, 2014, Soap Opera Digest broke exclusive news that Wood would be returning to the series. At press time, Wood was scheduled for a "handful" of episodes, which began airing on January 30, 2015. Wood revealed that she agreed to return to the show after Bell had personally sent her a text message. Of her status with the series, the actress said "if the timing is right, I'll always come back". In April 2015, Wood confirmed that she signed a contract deal with the series and would return in the role of Steffy. She made her on-screen return on May 26, 2015. Wood said: "When I left the show [in 2013], it wasn't a real goodbye", and mentioned that "Brad sent me a text with an idea for a storyline. We both got really excited about it and that was it. I was ready to go."

It was announced that on September 10, 2020, that Tanner Novlan's wife Kayla Ewell, who had previously portrayed Caitlin Ramirez on the show, would return to play an intimacy double or a stand-in for Wood as a result of the onset protocols due to the COVID-19 pandemic in the United States. Ewell took on the role as a Steffy intimacy double from September 2020 to March 2021. Due to social distancing on set slowly coming to an end in the filming process, since May 2021, Novlan and Wood have been filming their own closeness and intimate scenes.

== Character development ==
=== Characterization ===
"My character is the socialite who grew up getting whatever she wanted…money, fame, everything. She's like some of those famous girls—you know who I mean but we don't need to name them —who somehow always end up in the tabloids every day."

— Wood, TV Insider (2015)

Jamey Giddens of the soap opera website Daytime Confidential characterized Steffy as "bitch-nasty", while Wood has described her as strong-willed and a vixen. The program's website said that Steffy is a "stunning fashionista" and a "provocative trendsetter", and added that "when it comes to Steffy Forrester, things are never as they seem. On the surface she's sexy, stylish, clever, and together but below the surface, Ridge and Taylor's only surviving daughter is emotionally starved and slowly learning how to love and be loved". By 2011, Wood described Steffy as a "rich bitch" and stated, "I love playing her and developing her character. She is so different from me. It's rather cathartic, and it allows my alter ego to come out on The Bold and The Beautiful set five days a week." CBS Soaps in Depth characterized Steffy as the soap opera's "resident diva". When asked if Steffy was "a little bit nuts", Wood said: "yes, she's a mess. But a very strong mess."

Steffy is named after her paternal grandmother Stephanie Forrester (Susan Flannery), with Wood affirming: "She's always thinking. There's a reason she was named for her grandmother, Stephanie. There's always a tactic, always a strategy." Steffy and her brother Thomas have always dreamed of their parents Ridge (Ronn Moss) and Taylor (Hunter Tylo) reuniting. In 2009, the siblings manipulate their parents to get them back together in marriage. The storyline, inspired by The Parent Trap (1961), sees Steffy and Thomas tamper with SMS text messages between Ridge and his former love, Brooke Logan (Katherine Kelly Lang) to make Brooke believe that Ridge had dumped her, so she will not interrupt his reunion with Taylor. However, Brooke crashes the wedding after the marriage becomes official.

Wood said that she is sometimes puzzled when reading Steffy's scripts, but connects her present storyline to the character's past. She said: "I just think back to all the things Steffy has been through. She has a lot of deep seeded [sic] issues. That is where I think it stems from with her father leaving her, losing her sister, her mom sleeping with her sister's boyfriend, etc. There are just so many traumatic things! Explaining her reaction to Steffy killing her cousin Alexandria Forrester (Ashlyn Pearce) in self-defense, Wood stated in August 2015: "When I first heard about it, I was in major shock, of course. Then I started thinking about how everything bad happens to Steffy and that it makes sense that she's a murderer now. It's kind of perfect, really."

=== Phoebe's death and relationship with Rick ===
"You have to keep remembering that she did lose her fraternal twin, and I think people tend to forget that because we do shoot so fast, and that's how it's started. It was about the honesty and it was raw, and we could open up to each other in the heat of the moment"

— Wood on hooking up with Phoebe's boyfriend Rick after her death

A big storyline occurred for the character in 2008, when Phoebe is killed after the car her boyfriend Rick Forrester (Kyle Lowder) was driving crashes. Her death left Steffy "despondent and nearly suicidal". Wood recalled filming the storyline as being tough: "Being a newbie, I was up most of the night trying to memorize all those monologues." Speaking of emotional scenes where Steffy visited her sister's body in the morgue, the actress noted "She was so tiny and innocent, and to see this beautiful young girl in the morgue, I had to keep my emotions in check. It was challenging. It was such a sad story." Months later, Steffy becomes romantically involved with Rick, who was also previously in a relationship with her mother, Taylor. Reflecting on her initial reaction to the storyline, Wood revealed "Sometimes when you read a script, you're like, 'How am I going [to] do this? How is Steffy going to fall in love with Rick after he had sex with her sister and their mom?'" She also noted that "I had to play that my fraternal twin is gone, and maybe I am doing this to live her life as well as have fun. She had to fill that void, and she could not talk to anyone. She lost a part of herself. I have to stress that to the viewers." Wood was "completely shocked" with the speed at which the couple were moving, and said that the romance happened through Phoebe's death because of Steffy's raw feelings. However, she still felt that Steffy was in love with Rick and wanted to give herself to him. Lowder said the couple came together at the "height of their emotions when Phoebe died". While describing the romance as "complete honesty and no games", Wood said Steffy felt if she was close to Rick she could be close to Phoebe.

=== Rivalry with Hope and relationship with Liam ===
From 2010 to 2013, Steffy competes with her stepsister Hope Logan (Kimberly Matula) for Liam Spencer's (Scott Clifton) affections. Steffy had previously pined for Hope's first love, Oliver (Zack Conroy). The Hope/Steffy rivalry follows in the tradition of the animosity between Taylor and Hope's mother Brooke, who fight over Ridge in a love triangle that spans three decades. The show's head writer Bradley Bell said, "Hope's presence at Forrester Creations, as well as in Brooke and Ridge's home, sparks an intense competition between Hope and her step-sister Steffy as well as creates new conflict between long-time rivals Brooke and Taylor as each woman is determined to protect her own daughter."

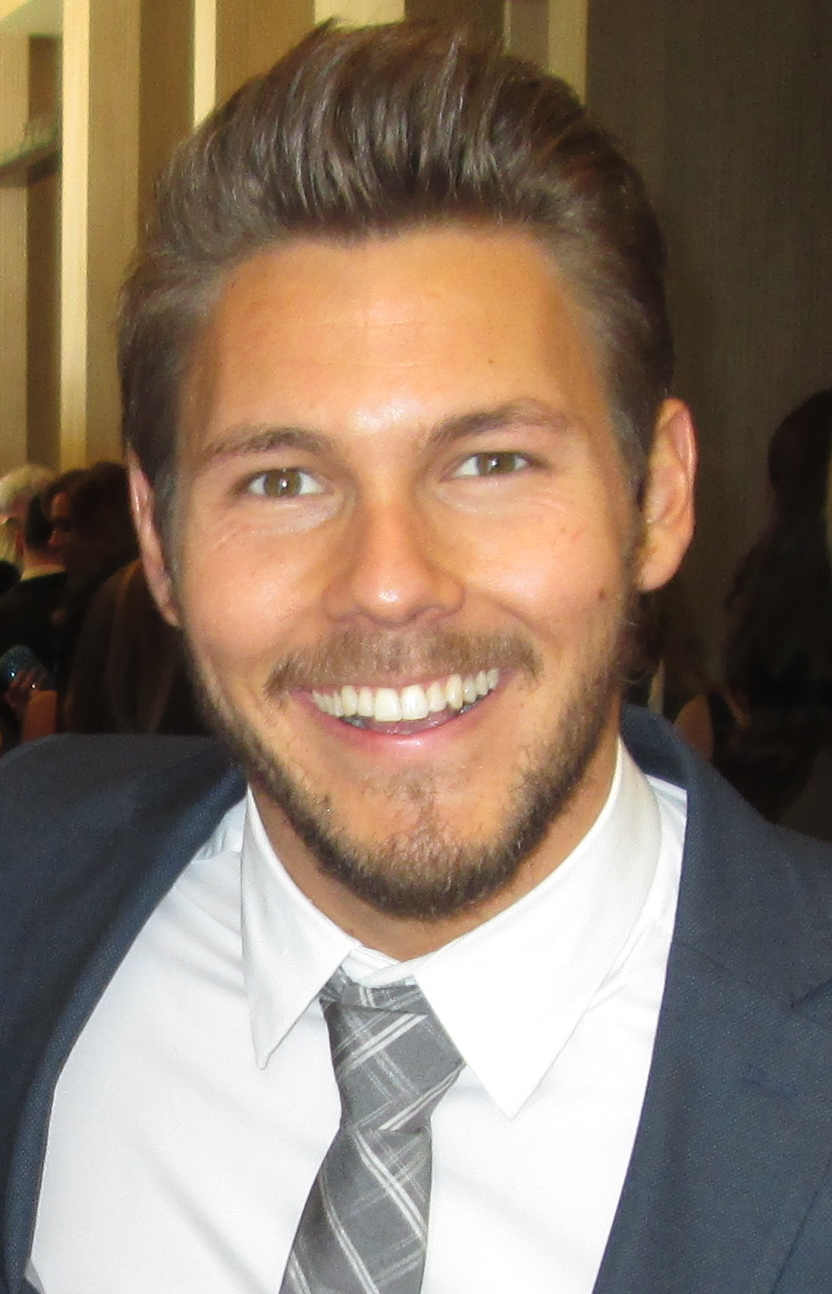
Scott Clifton plays Liam Spencer, Steffy's former romantic interest and her daughter's father.

Wood has stated that Steffy refuses to give Liam up because of everything she has been through and lost. She said, "It's hard for her to say goodbye and hard for her to leave ... She wants somebody there but she is very broken inside." After years of uncertainty, in which Liam is involved with Hope and Steffy, married to Steffy twice, never legally married to Hope, Steffy becomes pregnant with his child in 2013. Wood was shocked, and said that Steffy is a "wild child" who likes to go to nightclubs and ride motorcycles, but "everything just stops" with her pregnancy. Initially, Steffy does not tell Liam about the baby because she sees him in bed with Hope, and leaves for Paris. Liam discovers the truth and he marries Steffy at the Forrester Mansion. Just before discovering Steffy is carrying his child, Liam nearly marries Hope in a "room service elopement" scheme arranged by Brooke; an ambush that was described as "evil" by Daytime Confidential. Wood felt that Steffy is more mature and level-headed as a result of her pregnancy. Steffy later loses the child in a motorbike accident, and becomes unconscious.

The miscarriage leaves Steffy devastated and she decides to leave town, ending her marriage to Liam. Wood noted that "Steffy was so set on she really messed this up" and noticed that Liam still had feelings for Hope. Speaking of the miscarriage and the end of Liam and Steffy's marriage, Wood explained: "She is obviously trying a reason to get out of it. In her heart and soul, she wants to be with him. She felt he was her soulmate, but with everything that has happened, she feels it was her fault and she can't change that. She should never have gotten on that motorcycle and he told her not to. There have been so many things that happened that it opens her eyes to the possibility that maybe he should be with Hope." Upon Steffy's brief return to the show in 2015, she realizes that she still loves Liam, despite believing that these feelings were gone. Wood explained "They lost a child together, so they'll always have that emotional connection." Despite liking the fact that Steffy "speaks up" and "fights for love", Wood said that she wanted "to see someone come in and sweep her off her feet and take that pain away", not wanting her to fight for "a man that flip flops". However, Liam is involved with Steffy's cousin Ivy Forrester (Ashleigh Brewer) and Steffy does not win him back. Wood noted that "in Steffy's mind, Ivy is just some new woman in town and Liam is fair game. He and Ivy have no history." Eventually Liam breaks up with Ivy and after Steffy's marriage to Wyatt breaks down, Steffy and Liam rekindle their love and romance and they marry each other again for the third time. They eventually have a daughter named Kelly, however, due to a one-night-stand, with Liam's father, Bill, Steffy was unsure at first, whether he or Bill fathered Kelly. Due to cheating affairs, on both parties, Liam and Steffy, divorce for the third time. Liam impregnates and remarries Hope, now portrayed by Annika Noelle.

=== Relationship with Finn ===
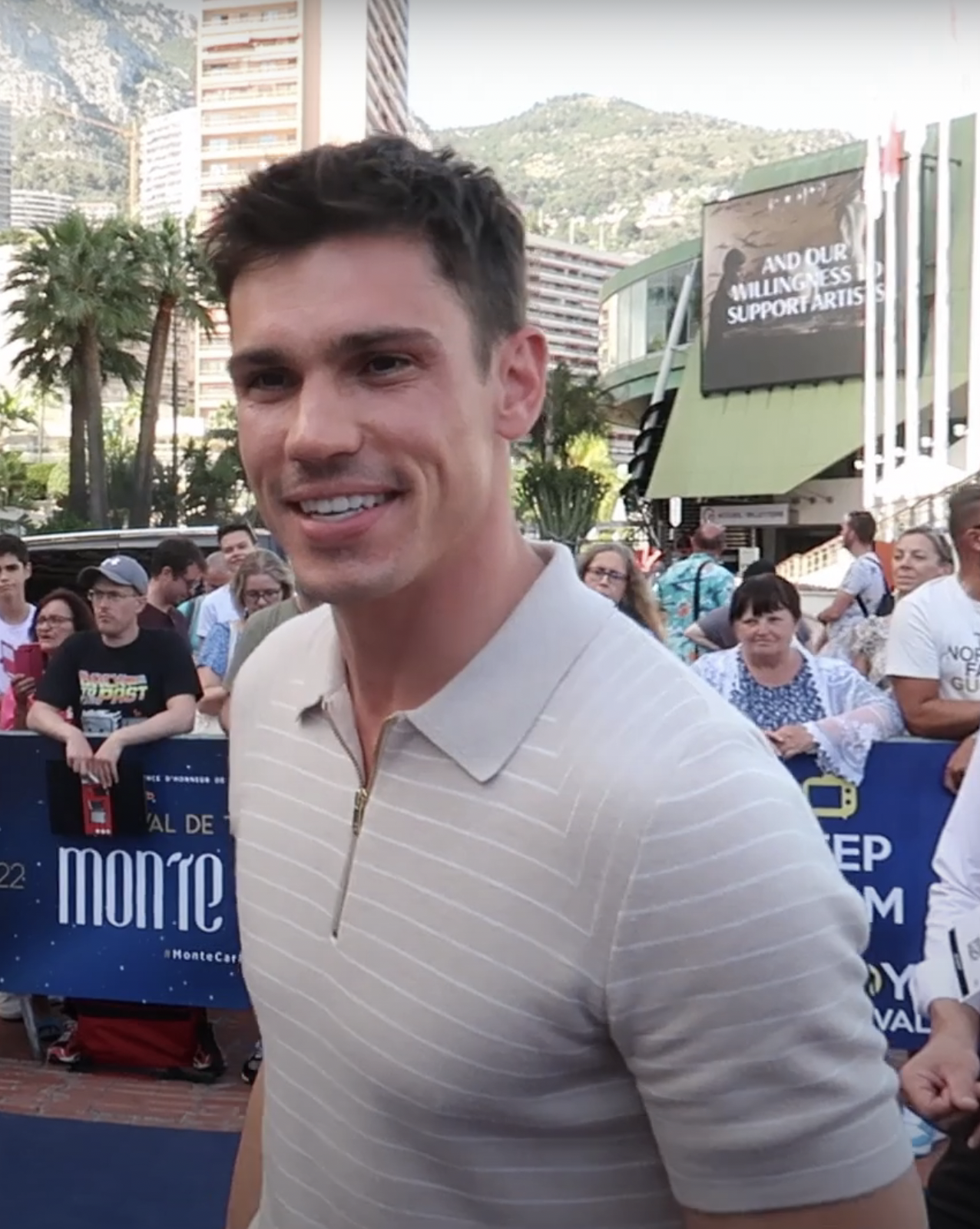
Tanner Novlan plays Finn, Steffy's current love interest and her son's father.

In the summer of 2020, Steffy is paired with John "Finn" Finnegan (Tanner Novlan) in a romantic storyline. Bradley Bell teased the coupling by accentuating that Steffy "is an accomplished mother, businesswoman, and fashion icon. She's an independent woman. Finn is a doctor and has his own life and his own desires and goals separate to hers. They're two complete individuals who can hopefully find a special love with one another."

Finn is introduced as the emergency physician who treats Steffy after she sustains injuries from a motorcycle accident. When Steffy opens her eyes at the hospital for the first time, Finn and Steffy undergo a love at first sight experience. Unaware that Steffy was developing a dependency on her opioids medication, Finn began to make frequent visits to her home after her stay at the hospital and provided her with some psychological counselling and friendship. However, due to the fact that throughout the numerous visits, he began developing a profound attraction to Steffy, Finn expresses that it would be best that he remove himself as her doctor to maintain his integrity, professionalism and ethics. Steffy maintains that she shares those same romantic feelings, and the pair share a passionate kiss for the first time. Bell discloses that "it's fertile ground for the building of a new romance" as Finn becomes Steffy's confidant and helper as she deals with both her physical and emotional burdens and addiction to her opioids.

As Steffy's addiction worsens and became evident to her friends and family, Finn participated in her intervention and agreed to place Steffy in a rehabilitation facility. Subsequent to her stay at the facility, Steffy and Finn agree to begin an intimate relationship. On their relationship, Wood notes that "for Steffy, there is something very familiar about him. He feels as though he's home. He's now obviously seen her at her worst. They're just extremely real with each other, and she can see that he's looking out for her. They are having real conversations about what they want. It's very obvious that Finn wants to have children in the future, and he wants to get serious. Of course, if he can handle Steffy through her terrible times, then he's a keeper!"

Months later, Steffy ends up pregnant. Due to a drunken one-night stand with ex-husband Liam, Steffy is unaware of whether he or Finn fathered her child. Despite the betrayal, Finn vows to stand by Steffy regardless of the baby's paternity. On Finn's extensive and gracious support, Wood asserts that "Steffy has really fallen for Finn. She sees the breadth of the great human that he is." Wood continues to express that Steffy recognizes she "has feelings for someone for the first time since Liam. She wants a future with Finn. I think they are a good fit." The father is eventually confirmed to be Finn, after a paternity switch orchestrated by Vinny Walker (Joe LoCicero) had originally and falsely claimed Liam as the father of the child. With the celebratory news of Finn being revealed as the biological father, the pair get engaged. They later welcome their son, Hayes Finnegan (Samantha Worden), at home via a water birth. Prior to their nuptials, Steffy meets Finn's adoptive parents, Jack (Ted King) and Li Finnegan (Naomi Matsuda). Billed as the "Wedding of the Year", the duo later exchange vows and marry at the Forrester family mansion, in front of their family and friends.

At the wedding reception, Finn learns that he is the long-lost son of the nefarious villainess Sheila Carter (Kimberlin Brown), creating both some palpable angst between Steffy and Finn and tense new rivalry between Sheila and Steffy, as Finn becomes torn between his wife and curiosity of knowing his biological mother. It is later divulged that Jack and Sheila had conceived Finn due to their extramarital affair and that Jack had conned his wife to adopt his own biological son in order to keep his affair secret. Steffy shows immense support to her husband, as Finn struggles to come to terms with his father's deception, bonding the two deeper in their marriage. In March 2022, Wood spoke to Soaps.com on the differences between the relationships between Steffy and Liam, and Steffy and Finn, and she stated that, for her character, "Finn brought out her softer, flirtatious side where as with Liam, things are usually a little more dark and twisted."

In April 2022, Novlan vacated the role of Finn when executive producer and head writer Bradley Bell chose to kill off Finn, at the hands of Sheila, who shoots him after he takes a bullet meant for Steffy. Wood admitted she would miss working with Novlan, affirming that as "a screen partner he gave everything he had. It was a delight to work with him and I hope we get to work together again in the future." She expressed her feelings of sadness that the decision to write off Finn would signify that "a colleague, amazing screen partner and friend would be leaving." It was later revealed in late May that Finn had survived the shooting and was being nursed back to health by his mother Li, which signified that Novlan had never in fact exited the role.

Unable to cope with the loss of Finn, Steffy leaves for Europe and unable to handle her grief, institutionalizes herself into a mental health care facility. Wood describes that losing Finn was deeply agonizing for Steffy, as Finn is "her true love, the father of her baby, her Prince Charming, and her happily ever after." Finn who is able to escape from Sheila's clutches (who had discovered him being taken care of Li and attacked her, and proceeded to hold Finn's hostage), flew to Monaco, where the pair experienced an emotional reunion in the backdrop of the French Riviera located church. Wood describes the reunion as "romantic, [...] passionate and raw" and emphasizes that Steffy feels "utterly on top of the world" as "her true love has literally come back to life."

In a May 2023 issue of Soap Opera Digest, Bradley Bell, dubbed the Steffy and Finn pairing, as a supercouple. During an interview in March 2024 with First for Women, Wood declared that for Steffy, Finn is "the yin to her yang and keeps her grounded," emphasizing the couple's soulmate connection and how Finn's presence provides Steffy with stability and a sense of rootedness.

== Storylines ==
Following the birth of their first child, Thomas Forrester, Taylor Hayes—married to Ridge—becomes pregnant with twins. Throughout the pregnancy, Taylor suffers with tuberculosis, although she delivers the children without medication. Steffy and Phoebe Forrester are born on September 21, 1999, as Taylor almost dies. Steffy is named after her paternal grandmother, Stephanie Forrester (Susan Flannery). In February 2001, a family trip to Saint Thomas—where Ridge and Taylor renew their vows—ends in devastation when two-year-old Steffy supposedly falls overboard during a storm and is presumed dead. However, Steffy has been kidnapped by Ridge's unstable ex-girlfriend Morgan DeWitt (Sarah Buxton)—who was previously obsessed with having a child with him— and Steffy is confined her to the walls of Morgan's home. Months after Steffy's supposed death, Taylor visits Morgan and discovers that Steffy is alive. Morgan then takes Taylor and Steffy hostage, but they are saved by Ridge. Morgan tries to flee but is arrested. The next year, Taylor is supposedly killed after being shot by another unstable resident, Sheila Carter (Kimberlin Brown), while trying to save Ridge's former love Brooke Logan (Katherine Kelly Lang) from being shot. Ridge marries Brooke months later and they raise the kids as a blended family. In 2005, Taylor returns, having been presumed dead after being shot by Sheila and returns to her marriage to Ridge. In 2006, Steffy leaves town for boarding school in England.

In 2008, a graduated Steffy returns to Los Angeles and begins working for the family fashion house, Forrester Creations. She briefly dates Marcus Walton (Texas Battle), and discovers that he is the son of Brooke's sister, Donna Logan (Jennifer Gareis). Phoebe is killed in a car accident after the car she was driving with her boyfriend Rick swerves off the road.

Steffy mourns the loss of Phoebe and begins a romance with Rick to feel closer to Phoebe. Her family are horrified and eventually break up the relationship. When businessman Bill Spencer, Jr. (Don Diamont) takes over Forrester Creations, Steffy attempts to seduce him, (who is married to Katie Logan (Heather Tom), (Brooke's sister) to win the company back for the Forresters in February 2010, ensuring that the Logan sisters have been excluded as owners.

Steffy takes an interest in Oliver (Zack Conroy)—who is dating Brooke's daughter, Hope Logan (Kimberly Matula),— but Oliver rejects her. At a pool party, Brooke has sex with a masked Oliver who she thought was ridge and he believed Brooke was Hope. At Hope's graduation party, a tape, supposedly narrated by Steffy, appears to expose this scandal. After Ridge consequently fires Steffy from Forrester Creations, Taylor compensates by signing over her 25% shares to Steffy. However, it is soon revealed that Steffy's narration was manipulated by computer expert Liam Spencer (Scott Clifton), who is Bill's son. Steffy forgives Liam and later develops feelings for him, but he begins a romance with Hope who will not have sex with him until marriage. Steffy travels to Paris for an extended business trip.

In 2011, Steffy returns from Paris and seeks a relationship with Bill. When Bill nearly drives Amber Moore (Adrienne Frantz) to her death at a cliff, Steffy—who saves Amber—keeps this a secret. Katie demands Bill see a therapist (Taylor). He later has an emotional affair with Steffy and vows to leave Katie for her which ends when Katie has a heart attack after learning of it.

Devastated by Bill's rejection, a distraught Steffy slips in her bathtub, nearly drowning herself, but she is saved by Liam, now Hope's fiancé. This reignites her feelings for him. While Hope neglects Liam emotionally during their wedding preparations, Steffy is constantly there for him. Hope watches Steffy and Liam kissing, and dumps him. Heartbroken, Liam instantly proposes to Steffy.

Organized by Bill (who would rather have Steffy as his daughter-in-law), they travel to Aspen, Colorado the next day later and marry, despite Hope trying to stop the wedding. Liam, however, cannot choose between Hope and Steffy, ultimately deciding to be with Hope after finding out that Bill had manipulated him into staying with Steffy. Liam files for divorce in 2012, but still in love with him, Steffy refuses to sign the papers. She eventually signs the papers, freeing Liam to marry Hope. However, Liam still has feelings for Steffy, prompting him to tear up the divorce papers and kiss her. Despite this, Liam and Steffy eventually divorce.

Shortly thereafter, Liam believes Hope has left him on their wedding day in Italy. He declares his love for Steffy, but Hope soon tells him of the misunderstanding. Liam and Hope unofficially marry in Italy only to realize the marriage is invalid.

Before Hope and Liam's official legal wedding in the United States, Steffy spends a night on the town with Liam. Hope finds out and leaves Liam. Steffy and Liam are reunited, and she soon finds she is pregnant in early 2013. However, she keeps it to herself when she sees Hope and Liam kissing. Liam finds out about the pregnancy and recommits himself to Steffy, but shortly after their wedding she who loses the baby in a motorbike accident. Steffy then learns that her accident has left her infertile. Devastated, Steffy decides to divorce Liam and relocate to Paris. She returns to Los Angeles several months later for a brief visit, informing Liam that her infertility issues have been corrected, hoping that it could mean a second chance for them. Despite this, Liam insists that he is obligated to Hope, and Steffy leaves town again. After another short visit to Los Angeles in February 2015, Steffy returns months later to help Ridge take over Forrester Creations by overthrowing Rick. She becomes president of the company and rekindles her romance with Liam, ending his relationship with her cousin, Ivy Forrester (Ashleigh Brewer).

Steffy's cousin, Aly (Ashlyn Pearce), resents Steffy, attributed to the fact that Taylor had accidentally killed her mother, Darla (Schae Harrison), years ago in car accident. An unstable Aly attempts to kill Steffy on PCH, resulting in Aly trying to kill Steffy with a tire iron. Ivy recorded a video of the accident on her phone, not seeing the rock Aly slipped and fell on. Ivy gets involved with Wyatt Spencer (Darin Brooks) and Ivy blackmails Steffy with the video, calling the accident a murder. Ivy decides to delete the video after Steffy tries to convince Wyatt to delete it. Thomas tells Steffy that he made out with Ivy while Wyatt was on a business trip. Steffy confronts Ivy and convinces her to tell Wyatt but tells Wyatt before Ivy has a chance. Wyatt breaks up with her, and Ivy is angry at Steffy and confronts her in front of a broken electrical panel, resulting in an altercation in which Ivy gets electrocuted. Ivy survives and files a restraining order against Steffy while Wyatt resumes his relationship with Ivy. Ivy realized she never got over Liam and convinces Liam to give them another chance if she drops the restraining order. Quinn overhears Ivy telling Liam she loves him and exposes this in front of Steffy and Liam while Wyatt is proposing to Ivy. Wyatt breaks up with Ivy and she packs her bags for Australia. On top of the staircase, Steffy confronts Ivy and she tumbles down. Liam is angry at Steffy and breaks up with her. Liam hits his head on the plane with Ivy, while Wyatt comforts Steffy. Liam disappears (he was really kidnapped by Quinn after having passed out due to concussion symptoms he acquired by hitting his head while on a plane and passing out in the parking lot of Forrester Creations and losing his memory as a result) and Wyatt tells her that Liam must have once again let her down.

Wyatt shows her how to have fun by surfing on the beach and even buys her a motorcycle, which she hasn't driven since her miscarriage. The two fall in love and eventually get married on the beach. Steffy's marriage to Wyatt eventually breaks down due to their differing opinions about Quinn, and they separate while Steffy contemplates divorcing Wyatt. She eventually rekindles her love and relationship with Liam. Liam proposes to Steffy, and she accepts, and after Steffy's divorce from Wyatt was finalized, Steffy and Liam got married in Sydney, Australia.

Their marriage is going well until Bill decides to burn down the Spectra building, to build a skyscraper in its place. Unbeknownst to Bill, Liam and his new friend Sally Spectra were still in the building. Liam and Sally shared a kiss thinking they were going to die. Steffy was empathetic towards Bill after everyone turned against him. Liam decided to be honest and told Steffy, upsetting her. Steffy left for the guest house, where Bill tried to comfort and seduce her. Steffy realized she's pregnant and a paternity test determined Liam as the father. Liam was thrilled to find out the news but confused by the need for the paternity test in her purse. Steffy confessed what happened and Liam was infuriated with both Bill and Steffy. He served her annulment papers but would be around for the baby. Steffy's arch rival Hope Logan (Annika Noelle) returned to L.A and confronted her about her affair with Bill. Hope helped Steffy to try to win Liam back by being a confidant to him and her.

Throughout her pregnancy, Steffy tries to win Liam back and not have him divorce her. Also Steffy dealt with Bill meddling in her marriage. Hope and Steffy's rivalry ignited again when Hope started to fall in love with Liam again, and tried to get him to leave Steffy. Liam decided to give Steffy a second chance by sending her white roses and a note as a sign of forgiveness. However Liam divorces Steffy when Wyatt told him that Steffy and Bill were having an affair, unaware that Bill manipulated Wyatt into thinking Steffy betrayed Liam again. When Bill visited Steffy, he tried to convince her that they belonged together, but Steffy demanded Bill leave. After Steffy slammed the door on Bill, she fell and went into labor.

Steffy gave birth to a girl whom she named after Liam's late mother. However, despite being the mother of his child and emotionally invested in him, she called off their engagement when she caught Hope and Liam kissing backstage at Forester, and almost married Bill when he asked her to marry him. Steffy realized her worth, and ultimately chose herself. Bill as a sign of good gesture, signed over his 12% of FC to Steffy. Afterwards Steffy returned to Forrester to announce that she was now a majority shareholder of FC. When Liam arrived at Forester's Steffy told him that she did not marry Bill, but she will not be with Liam because of Steffy realizing that Liam will never choose between her and Hope and she decided to focus on her daughter Kelly and work. She will not repeat the cycle that her mother did with Ridge and Brooke. Steffy gave Hope her blessing to marry Liam as she wants him to be happy and wants to set an example to Kelly.

Steffy invites her mother, Taylor, to move in with her despite Hope's wishes for her to leave town after finding out she allegedly shot Bill Spencer. Steffy tries to convince Hope that Taylor would never hurt their daughters. Hope decides she doesn't want her baby to grow up with her sister Kelly if Taylor is part of the family. Steffy decides to adopt a baby so Kelly can have a sibling close in age just like she did before Phoebe died. Steffy unknowingly adopts Beth, after Dr. Buckingham switched her with a stillborn to pay off a gambling debt. Steffy names the baby girl Phoebe in honor of her sister. Steffy and Liam decide it would be good for Phoebe to grow up with Liam as a father figure.

When Steffy's nephew Douglas visits, he tells her, Liam and Hope that Phoebe is Beth (Hope and Liam's daughter) and that he heard his dad, Thomas say that Beth was alive. Steffy and Hope thinks that Douglas is confused, but Liam would not let it go. Steffy tells Liam that Beth is gone and that her baby is Phoebe. After Steffy returns with Kelly from a doctors appointment, Liam and Hope break the news to her that Flo, who was the supposed birth mother confessed that Phoebe is Beth and that she is not the birth mother. Also they fill Steffy in on Dr Buckingham switching Beth with a stillborn baby, and that he sold Beth to Steffy because of his gambling debt. However Liam and Hope tells Steffy that Taylor was not involved in the illegal adoption, and that she wanted to give Steffy a daughter by paying Reese a lot of money. Unaware that Taylor gave Reese the money for his gambling debt. Liam reveals who knows about Beth being alive including Thomas. Steffy at first refuses to give up Beth because she had bonded with her and loves her, but after realizing that Beth is Hopes daughter (even though there is no proof) and that Hope never got the chance to be Beth's mother, Steffy gives Beth back to Hope. After Liam, Brooke, and Hope leave with Beth, Steffy collapses in Ridges arms crying over the loss of Phoebe.

Shortly thereafter, Steffy hears that Thomas was in the hospital due to being pushed off the edge of her cliff house by Brooke. Steffy then confronts Thomas at the hospital. Steffy informs Thomas that she will never forgive him and he will never see Kelly, or her ever again. However, with the help from Ridge, Steffy slowly forgives Thomas. Liam and Brooke believes that Thomas is still obsessed with Hope even after giving her parental rights to Douglas. Liam then asks her to hire Zoe back to spy on Thomas. Steffy agrees but warns Zoe to not betray her and her family again. Zoe is hired again and is now dating Thomas. Steffy and Hope believes that Thomas has changed even with dating Zoe. Liam stays at Steffy's house after a fight with Hope over giving up her rights to Douglas. Thomas calls Steffy to kiss Liam to break up Liam and Hope, and tells her that he will call her when Hope arrives as a signal to see them kiss. Steffy kisses Liam and Hope is heartbroken when she sees them both kiss. Hope breaks up with Liam and kicks him out of the cabin. Liam stays at the cliff house with Steffy and Kelly. Steffy feels guilty and tries to tell Liam, but Thomas manipulates her to keep quit. Steffy keeps quiet until she sees Thomas's sketch for the showstopper gown for Hope for the future and realize that Liam and Brooke were right about Thomas all along. As well as finally learning that the gown was for Hope for her to marry him again for the sake of Douglas. Steffy confronts Thomas on using Zoe and Douglas to get to Hope. Steffy finally tells Liam and Hope the truth. All three make a plan to expose Thomas at his wedding with Zoe. When Thomas is about to marry Zoe, Hope stops him by wearing the showstopper gown. Thinking that his plan worked, Thomas picks Hope over Zoe, but his plan backfired when Hope tells him that she knows what he has been up to. Hope reveals to the family that Thomas has been using Zoe to get to her and manipulating Douglas into thinking that he would lose another mother if Thomas married Zoe. When Thomas tries to marry Zoe again, Zoe also informs him that Hope already told her before the wedding his plan to be with Hope again and refuses to marry him. Steffy tells Thomas that Hope and Liam knows about the staged kiss, as well as Hope knowing about the showstopper gown. The family and mostly Ridge are disappointed in Thomas because they believed him over Brooke and Liam. Thomas then pleads with Hope to be with him, but Hope refuses and rejects him.

In July 2020, after a motorbike accident, Steffy lands at the hospital and meets her doctor, John Finnegan (Tanner Novlan) and both experience an immediate attraction to each other and cultivate a love at first sight connection. Suffering from a back injury and fractured ribs, Steffy began taking pills for pain relief as prescribed by Finn. Finn visited Steffy, as he lived near Steffy's home, to drop off her missing paperwork. He asks Steffy that since he lived nearby if he could come see her to check on her recovery, Steffy promptly agrees and expresses how she would love that. During the visits, the two bond over past emotional trauma and pain. Steffy soon develops a heavy dependence on the pills and begins asking Finn for an extra prescription during one of his house visits. He accepts it once, before flat out refusing thereafter due to the addictive nature of opioids. Finn later decides to tell Steffy that, for ethical reasons, he will remove himself as her physician, as he has developed romantic feelings for her, and Steffy expresses that she shares those same romantic sentiments. The pair share a first kiss. Steffy soon experiences addiction to the pills and is found passed out on her couch at home. After an intervention set up, Finn agrees to place Steffy in a rehabilitation facility. Later, the pair pronounced their love for one another and begin an intimate relationship subsequent to her leave from the facility.

Months later, Steffy finds herself pregnant after she had a drunken stupor led to a one-night stand with Liam, leaving her questioning her child's paternity. With her intuitive sentiment and strong desire for having Finn father the child, Steffy was later shattered to learn from Dr Campbell (Tina Huang) that the result from the laboratory had listed Liam as the father. Finn tells Steffy that while he would like to stand by her, however, he does not know how he could fit in her life. Steffy pleads to Finn not to leave her as he is the man that she loves and wants to be with. Finn decides to stay and even attends Steffy's ultrasound appointments with her. Shortly thereafter, Finn and Thomas come to learn that Vinny Walker (Joe LoCicero) tampered with the test, and Finn is indeed the child's biological father. Finn reveals to Steffy the joyous news and proposes to Steffy, who accepts. With the assistance of a midwife, the pair welcome at home their son via waterbirth and name him, Hayes Forrester Finnegan (Samantha Worden), as a homage to his maternal grandmother, Taylor Hayes. The duo later tie the knot at the Forrester mansion in an intimate ceremony, attended by close family and friends.

== Reception ==
=== Critical and viewer reception ===
Wood's performance of Steffy has received acclaim, and she has become a fan favorite. On-Air On-Soaps said Wood had the "unique challenge" of making the despised character into a more complex and well-rounded one, who fans were rooting for, while also praising her as "one of the hardest working younger actresses in daytime today". Writing for Canyon News in July 2009, Tommy Garrett applauded Wood for making the role "believable" and noted that fans have "readily accepted her as the surviving twin of Ridge and Taylor's", saying: "Stepping into a role that has been played by more than one actress would be a very daunting task for a lesser actress. But Jacqueline has embraced the role and made it her own." Garrett enjoys Wood playing a story in which she is "shocked to learn things". While criticizing the material written for the character as being "often repetitive and silly", Sara Bibel of Xfinity opined in June 2012 that Wood is a "charismatic actress" who rises above the script to "deliver consistently interesting performances". In July 2012, Soaps in Depth commended Wood's performance, observing that "While her sexiness is a given, Wood has a way of bringing a cool, copacetic attitude to her scenes", while praising her ability to infuse "both melancholy and mirth" in her performance. In March 2015, Michael Logan of TV Insider called Steffy "that maddeningly complicated sexbomb".

In 2022, Charlie Mason from Soaps She Knows placed Steffy 5th on his ranked list of The Bold and the Beautiful's Best of the Best Characters Ever, commenting "The term "red-hot mama" was all but coined for Jacqueline MacInnes Wood's fierce and feisty alter ego, a cool rider with an exterior that's as tough as leather and a heart that — despite how Liam treats it! — is as delicate as lace."

==== Romance ====
Canyon News called Rick and Steffy's relationship "tumultuous" and a "fun ride" for viewers. When Steffy began pursuing Bill Spencer, Jr. in 2011, despite his marriage to Katie Logan, Jemmah Kelly of TV Soap remarked: "Whoever coined the phrase 'there ain't no rest for the wicked', must have had The Bold and the Beautiful's Steffy Forrester in mind", writing that "nothing is off limits for this scheming beauty". When Steffy became pregnant in 2013, Garrett said that while he "loved seeing Jacquie play a vixen, it's equally a fascinating and entertaining watching her as a heroine". He noted that Steffy still had "that edge", and Wood is a "creative genius, an actress who just seems to get better with time". Regan Cellura of Daytime Confidential criticized the motorcycle crash plot in which Steffy miscarries her baby, writing "I'm sorry, but whose idea was it for a pregnant lady to ride a motorcycle?" and "I can't even muster up a little snark other than I can't stand baby killers".

Daytime Confidential hailed the rivalry between Hope and Steffy as the show's "Next Generation" version of Brooke and Taylor. Prior to the introduction of Liam, TV Soap wrote: "After 23 years of being the main love triangle on The Bold and The Beautiful, it looks like the Brooke/Ridge/Taylor saga is being pushed into the background by three new players – Steffy, Oliver and Hope", and noted that "diehard" fans of the show had begun recognizing the trio of Steffy, Oliver and Hope as "the new Brooke, Ridge and Taylor". TV Week called Steffy, Liam and Hope "one of Bold's classic love triangles". However, Michael Logan, writing for TV Guide, observed in 2012 that the trio's saga was "heavily" played and had "taken over the show". In February 2013, "#Steffy" became a trending topic on Twitter during the scene where Steffy stopped Hope and Liam's impromptu wedding to reveal her pregnancy.

Steffy's romance with newcomer Finn earned positive acclaim from critics, who praised their chemistry both during social distancing protocols as well as post restrictions. Commonly referred to by the portmanteau "Sinn" in magazines, on social media and internet message boards, Finn's relationship with Steffy attracted a large fan following and garnered quite a vocal fan base very quickly with the duo debuting on fan polls in both magazines and online sites. Journalist Jeevan Brar from The TV Watercooler argued that "usually, it takes a while for audiences to warm up to not only a new character but a new pairing. B&B fans quickly jumped aboard for [Finn], and for Sinn." Charlene Bazarian highly emphasize that "Finn is the first man" in a very long time "who has captured Steffy's heart and fans of [the show] are excited to see what's in the future for this couple." SoapCentral.com named "Steffy and Finn" to be the show's "Best New Couple" of the year 2020. Meanwhile, Soap Opera News ranked Steffy and Finn 6th on its list of the "Top 10 The Bold and the Beautiful Couples for 2020!" When Steffy learns she is pregnant with either Liam or Finn's child, viewers were also left to ponder the paternity. In response to an online poll by Soap Opera Digest which asked "Who were you hoping would prove to be the father of Steffy's baby on B&B?", 95 per cent of readers hoped that Finn would be the father of Steffy's unborn child over Liam, indicating strong support for the Steffy and Finn relationship. In their list of "Top 10 Soap Couples of 2021!", Soap Opera News ranked Steffy and Finn at number four and the following year in 2022, the site exclaimed that the "couple proved to be the ultimate duo of the year," climbing to the number one spot.

In July 2021, the birth of Steffy and Finn's son Hayes via waterbirth proved polarizing with audiences, while also earning praise; M. Skye from TVSource Magazine noted that the home birth illustrated how "the chemistry between Jacqui [Wood] and Tanner [Novlan] was off the charts." Skye continued: "How could they take something like childbirth and make it sexy? Their natural chemistry oozed into all the moments, and they made giving birth look—erotic. They raised the bar, and I truly don't ever want to see a normal soap opera birth again." In August 2022, Soap Opera Digest released the results of an online poll inquiring on the "Best Current Pairing" of the soap, Finn and Steffy conquered the poll with 59 per cent, defeating Quinn and Carter (18%), Brooke and Ridge (16%), Donna and Eric (5%), and Liam and Hope (2%).

Steffy and Finn's reunion, which was filmed in Monte Carlo, received much critical acclaim. The reunion earned Soap Opera Digest's "Editor's Choice" in their August 29, 2022 issue, depicting it as a "perfect, precious, poignant moment, all was well in the B&B world, and in the 'Sinn' fandom." In their list of "Soaps’ Best and Worst of 2022... So Far", Soaps.com honored it as the "Most Romantic Reunion", stating that "it was everything a soap fan could want… and more." Shay McBryde of ShowSnob.com, a site under the FanSided network, curated a "Best Soap Opera couples of 2023: The most sizzling romances on Daytime Television" list, where Steffy and Finn secured the fourth rank. McBryde contends that the pairing illustrates "the best physical romance in daytime television today" and asserts "if you want to talk about the hottest couples of daytime this is your blueprint."

In a June 2024 Toronto Star article, columnist Shinan Govani referred to Finn and Steffy as a supercouple. Amber Sinclair from DailyDrama expresses that the pairing is "a fan-favorite supercouple" and "one of daytime TV’s hottest couples." On August 23, 2024, to mark the four-year anniversary of the pairing's debut, devoted Sinn fans from multiple social media platforms joined forces to arrange for an airplane banner to fly over CBS Television City, bearing the message: "Happy 4 Years of Sinn J&T We Love You ♥️."

In 2024, Michael Fairman named Finn and Steffy as his "Best Couple" in the "Best and Worst in Soaps 2024" listing. Highlighting their dynamic, Fairman writes, "Who doesn’t love the man of your dreams rescuing you from a deranged young woman who locked you up in a cage! Team Sinn!" Similarly, Soap Opera Digest recognized Steffy and Finn as the "Best Couple" in their "Bold and Beautiful: The Best and Worst of 2024" feature. Meanwhile, Soap Opera News gave them an honorary mention for "Best Soap Couple of 2024."

=== Accolades ===
Wood's performance earned her Daytime Emmy nominations for Outstanding Younger Actress in a Drama Series in 2012 and 2013. For the 2012 Daytime Emmy Awards, Wood submitted the scenes in which Steffy is informed of the end of her affair with Bill. A 2013 Daytime Confidential poll entitled "Who should win Outstanding Younger Actress?" saw Wood rank ahead of fellow daytime actresses Hunter King (The Young and the Restless), Kristen Alderson and Lindsey Morgan (General Hospital), with readers favoring her as the likely winner of the award. For the 2013 Daytime Emmy Awards, Wood submitted the scenes where Steffy surprises Liam by presenting him with signed annulment papers. Michael Logan listed Wood as his predicted winner in the Outstanding Younger Actress category for that year, writing: "Wood is startlingly versatile and in supreme command as Steffy hands over the signed annulment papers to her husband Liam. There are surprises galore, including a wondrously off-key, Bob Hope-inspired rendition of "Thanks for the Memory," and Wood is at once raw, goofy, sexy. luminous, profound and so very memorable. I may be fairly crummy at my Emmy predictions but this I'm dead certain about: Wood is going to be a major star."

For the 2018 Daytime Emmy Awards, Wood received a nomination for Outstanding Supporting Actress in a Drama Series, yet lost her bid to Camryn Grimes from The Young and the Restless. In the following year, Wood ascended and earned a nomination for Outstanding Lead Actress in a Drama Series, becoming the fifth actress overall, to have been nominated in all three drama performer categories. At the 2019 Daytime Emmy Awards ceremony, Wood won her first Daytime Emmy in the Lead Actress category. Wood went on to win her second Daytime Emmy in the Lead Actress category in 2021. For her performances of Steffy surrounding Finn's "death" and then eventual reunion with Finn, Wood garnered her third Emmy in the category.
