= Gareis =

Gareis is a surname. Notable people with the surname include:

- Jennifer Gareis (born 1970), American actress
- Franz Gareis (1775–1803), German painter
- Martin Gareis (1891–1976), German general during World War II
- Roland Gareis (born 1948), Austrian economist
- Karl von Gareis (1844–1923), German legal scholar
