= Jennifer Gareis =

American actress (born 1970)

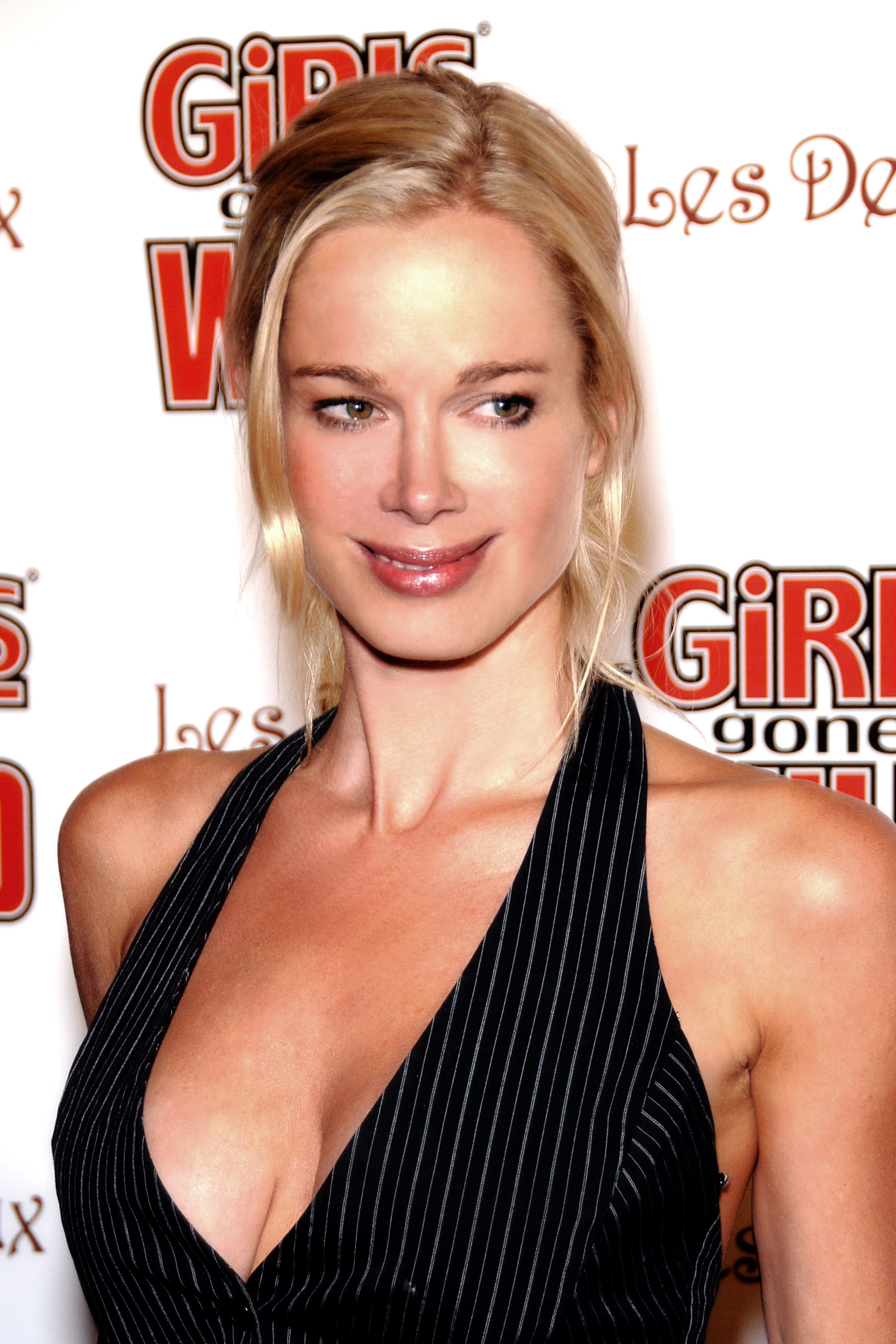
- Gareis in 2008
- Born: August 1, 1970 (age 56); Lancaster, Pennsylvania, U.S
- Education: Franklin and Marshall College (BSc); Pepperdine University (MBA)
- Spouse: Bobby Ghassemieh (m. 2010)
- Children: 2
- Beauty pageant titleholder
- Title: Miss New York USA 1994
- Years active: 1992–present
- Major competition: Miss USA 1994 (Top 6)

Jennifer Gareis (born August 1, 1970) is an American actress and beauty pageant titleholder. She is best known for her roles as Grace Turner on The Young and the Restless (1997–2000, 2002, 2004, 2014) and as Donna Logan on The Bold and the Beautiful (2006–).

== Early life ==
Gareis was born in Lancaster, Pennsylvania, and graduated from J. P. McCaskey High School in 1988. She graduated from Franklin and Marshall College in 1993 with a Bachelor of Science degree in accounting, then earned a Master's of Business Administration degree from Pepperdine University.

Her father was German American. She is also of partial Italian descent (Sicily). Her great-grandmother Sebastiana Tringali came from Militello in Val di Catania and the city gave her the honorary citizenship.

== Career ==
Gareis competed in her first beauty pageant in 1991 when she placed second runner-up at Miss Pennsylvania USA 1992. She later competed in New York, winning the Miss New York USA 1994 title, and representing New York in the Miss USA 1994 pageant held in South Padre Island, Texas on February 11, 1994. Gareis placed in the top six of the nationally televised pageant, which was won by Lu Parker of South Carolina.

Gareis later began an acting career and landed the role of Grace Turner on CBS soap opera The Young and the Restless, which she played from 1997 to 2000 and again in 2001, 2002, 2004 and 2014. She is best known for her current role as Donna Logan on The Bold and the Beautiful, a role she has played intermittently since July 2006. She was ranked #90 on the Maxim Hot 100 Women of 2002.

In 2024, Gareis received a nomination for the Daytime Emmy Award for Outstanding Supporting Actress in a Drama Series for her role as Donna.

== Personal life ==
Gareis married Bobby Ghassemieh on March 7, 2010. On June 11, 2010, Gareis gave birth to a son. Her daughter was born June 29, 2012.

== Filmography ==
Year	Title	Role	Notes
1996	The Mirror Has Two Faces	Unknown	uncredited
1997–2000, 2002, 2004, 2014	The Young and the Restless	Grace Turner	Contract role: 1997–99, recurring role: 2000, 2002, 2004, 2014
1997	Private Parts	Coed	
1997	Lifebreath	Elevator Woman	
1998	Enough Already	Unknown	
2000	Gangland	Sarah	
2000	Luckytown	Sugar	
2000	The 6th Day	Virtual Girlfriend	
2000	Miss Congeniality	Tina	
2001	College Try	Christine	
2001	Diagnosis: Murder	Thalia Roselawn	Episode: "Less Than Zero"
2001	Downward Angel	Woman	
2001	Feather Pimento	Woman in Green	Short
2001	What Boys Like	Brooke	
2002	Air Strike	Charlie	
2002	Boat Trip	Sheri	
2005	Veronica Mars	Cheyenne	Episodes: "A Trip to the Dentist" and "Leave It to Beaver"
2005	Venus on the Halfshell	Honey O'Hara	
2006–	The Bold and the Beautiful	Donna Logan	Contract role: July 20, 2006 – February 18, 2015; October 29, 2018 – Present; Recurring role: March 2015 – September 2018
2006	Escape	Ecstatic Blonde	Short
2007	Panic Button	Susan	
2014	Infernal	Sarah	
2016	Comedy Bang! Bang!	Handsome Harbor Actress	Episode: "Kristen Schaal Wears Strawberry Colored Pants and a Multicolored Shirt"

== Awards and nominations ==
Year	Award	Category	Work	Result
2020	Soap Hub Award	Favorite Actress	The Bold and the Beautiful	Nominated
2021	Soap Hub Award	Favorite Actress	The Bold and the Beautiful	Nominated
2024	Daytime Emmy Awards	Outstanding Supporting Actress in a Drama Series	The Bold and the Beautiful	Nominated
