= Donna Logan =

- The Bold and the Beautiful character
- Jennifer Gareis as Donna Logan
- Portrayed by: Carrie Mitchum (1987–2001); Mary Sheldon (1991); Jennifer Gareis (2006–present)
- Duration: 1987–1991; 1994–1995; 2001; 2006–present
- First appearance: March 25, 1987
- Created by: William J. Bell
- Introduced by: William J. Bell; Lee Phillip Bell (1991, 1994–1995); Bradley Bell (2006)
- Book appearances: Dangerous Love (2014)
In-universe information
- Other names: Donna Forrester; Donna Barber
- Occupation: Model; Receptionist
- Family: Logan family
- Father: Stephen Logan
- Mother: Beth Logan
- Brothers: Storm Logan
- Sisters: Brooke Logan; Katie Logan
- Husband: Eric Forrester (2008–2010, 2024–present); Justin Barber (2011)
- Sons: Marcus Forrester
- Granddaughters: Rosie Forrester
- Grandmothers: Helen Logan
- Nephews: Rick Forrester; R.J. Forrester; Jack Marone; Will Spencer
- Nieces: Bridget Forrester; Hope Logan; Flo Fulton

Donna Logan is a fictional character from the CBS soap opera The Bold and the Beautiful.

== Casting ==
The character was played by Carrie Mitchum on a contract basis from March 25, 1987, to March 6, 1991, who made guest appearances from September 6 to October 4, 1994, November 16, 1994, February 21, 1995, March 27 to April 2, 1996, and January 12 to 17, 2001. From March 7 to 12, 1991, the role was portrayed by Mary Sheldon, and then by Jennifer Gareis as a series regular from July 20, 2006, to February 18, 2015. From October 20, 2016, to September 25, 2018, Gareis appeared in a recurring capacity. In January 2018, Gareis teased her return to the serial via her social media accounts. In September 2018, Gareis announced she was once again appearing in a regular capacity and she made her return on October 29, 2018.

== Storylines ==
=== 1987–2001 ===
Donna Logan was concerned about her younger sister Katie, who had low self-esteem due to excessive acne, and convinced Donna's classmate, Rocco Carner, to date her. Rocco was attracted to Donna, but she was already involved with Mark Mallory and was residing with him. When Donna realised Mark wasn't right for her, she kicked him out of her life, but she and Rocco were never able to make a go of their relationship. Donna was hired to model for Tommy Bayland, who referred her to agent Nick Preston, who convinced Donna to pose nude for a magazine in Europe. Media mogul Bill Spencer saw the photos and published them in a US magazine, leading Donna to join forces with Nick and Rocco to take nude pictures of Bill to publish in his own magazines. Donna eventually confessed to what she did to Bill and asked Bill to transfer her father Stephen, who worked for Bill's company, back to Los Angeles from Paris, but Stephanie Forrester opposed that idea. After a failed relationship with Thorne Forrester, Donna left Los Angeles for San Francisco, and returned for special occasions. In 2001, she returned to Los Angeles with all her family.

=== 2006– ===
Donna returned to LA in 2006, and immediately began trying to persuade her sister Brooke, who had now married Nick Marone, to take Ridge back, reminding her of how long she had fought to keep him. When Donna was unsuccessful in convincing her sister to return to Ridge, she went after him herself. This eventually failed, when she realized that Brooke and Ridge would always be connected. She was then engaged to marry Thorne Forrester. However it ended soon after when Donna's younger sister, Katie revealed that Donna was only with Thorne out of spite and revenge rather than actual love. Donna then became involved with Eric Forrester who was still married. He later divorced Stephanie to be with Donna. This sparked a rivalry between Donna and Stephanie's younger sister Pamela who was desperate to see Stephanie and Eric reunite. Eric and Donna eventually married, much to Pam's dismay. However their marriage was not without problems. Eric's daughter Felicia had allied herself with her brothers, Thorne and Ridge, to eliminate Donna out of Forrester Creations, because of the supposed bad publicity that the company had received since Eric married Donna (of whom none of them approve). Their efforts had been not too well received by Eric, who was angry that his children aren't willing to give Donna a chance. Even their mother Stephanie encouraged them to drop their animosity toward her, if only for their father's sake.

During a business meeting at Forrester Creations, it was revealed by Felicia that when Donna was eighteen she had given up a baby boy for adoption. Marcus Walton, a new employee at Forrester, was revealed to be Donna's son. Thorne and Felicia attempted to use this information to drive Donna out of the company, but were shocked when Eric adopted Marcus. After Eric suffered a heart attack, and was revealed to have been poisoned, Felicia continued to ally with her brothers in eliminating Donna's presence from their lives. When Eric awoke from his coma, Felicia helped to reunite him with Stephanie; though this reunion proved short-lived and he eventually returned to Donna much to Felicia and her brothers' chagrin.

Bill Spencer, Jr. had his sights set on Donna but later turned his attention to Katie. After Spencer Publications took over Forrester Creations, Donna was reunited with her old high school flame, Justin Barber, who is vice-president at Spencer Publications. Donna confided in Katie that Justin was the father of her son, Marcus. After agonizing over the decision of whether or not to tell Justin about Marcus, Donna decided to keep silent about the matter, but Justin quickly learned of Donna's son, and, after an intense confrontation with Donna, learned that he was Marcus's father. Justin demanded that Donna let him know his son, and Donna reluctantly agreed.

Donna and Eric end their marriage and Justin and Donna rekindle their relationship and get married soon after. However it was short-lived and they divorced months later. They remain friends as well as loving parents to Marcus and loving grandparents to their granddaughter, Rosie. Donna then started a relationship with Nick Marone, but it ended quickly after it was revealed that he and his mother stole designs from Forrester. Donna later finds out about Bill's many schemes to break up his son, Liam, and Donna's niece, Hope. She confronts Bill and informs him that she will not stay quiet. However she later changes her mind when she finds Liam and his ex-wife, Steffy, together intimately. Donna encourages her niece to move on from Liam as she does not want to see Hope get hurt. Hope finds out later that Donna and several others knew about Bill's actions however Hope forgives her aunt. Donna then gets caught up in another scandal of Bill's when he and her older sister, Brooke had an affair whilst he was still married to their younger sister, Katie. The affair resulted in a pregnancy and miscarriage. Later when Bill leaves Katie for Brooke, Donna ended up in the middle of it and tries to mediate an unsuccessful reconciliation between her two sisters. Donna then becomes rivals with jewellery designer Quinn Fuller as they compete for Eric's affections. Donna moves to Dallas to be with her father. In October 2016, Donna briefly returns for Brooke and Bill's wedding, which ends up not happening due to Ridge's interference. In December 2017, Donna returns to spend Christmas with her sisters. In February 2018, Donna attends Brooke and Ridge’s wedding. In May and August 2018, Donna returns twice for Hope and Liam's wedding. In September 2018, Donna returns for Katie and Thorne’s wedding, and moves permanently back to Los Angeles the following month.

== Reception ==
In 2022, Charlie Mason from Soaps She Knows placed Donna 28th on his ranked list of The Bold and the Beautiful’s Best of the Best Characters Ever, commenting "You don't survive a bear attack on The Bold and the Beautiful and not gain yourself a reputation as a bit of a badass. So, uh, word to the wise, Quinn: Don't count out Eric's fourth wife — ever." In 2024, Jennifer Gareis was shortlisted for the Daytime Emmy Award for Outstanding Supporting Actress in a Drama Series for her role as Donna.
