= Bradley Bell =

American television writer and producer

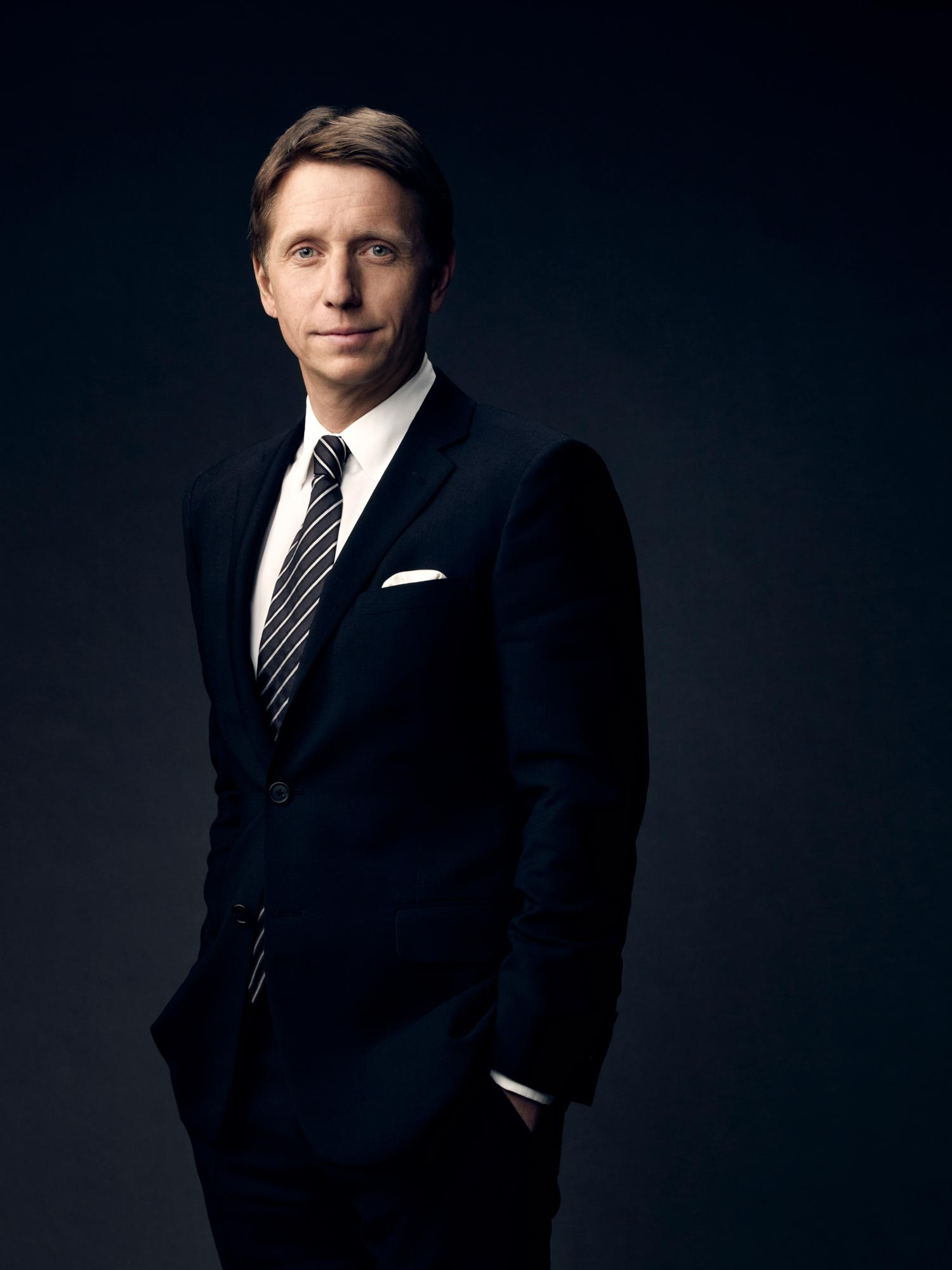
- Born: Bradley Phillip Bell; June 29, 1964 (age 62); Chicago, Illinois, U.S.
- Occupations: Executive producer, head writer
- Years active: 1984–present
- Known for: The Bold and the Beautiful
- Spouse: Colleen Bradley (m. 1991)
- Children: 4
- Parent(s): William J. Bell (father); Lee Phillip Bell (mother)
- Relatives: William J. Bell Jr. (brother); Lauralee Bell (sister)

Bradley Phillip Bell (born June 29, 1964) is an American television writer and producer. Bell is an eight-time Daytime Emmy Award winner and is executive producer and head writer for The Bold and the Beautiful, the CBS soap opera.

== Early life and education ==
Bell was born in Chicago, Illinois, the son of William J. Bell and Lee Phillip Bell. Bell's parents co-created the soap operas The Young and the Restless and The Bold and the Beautiful. His mother was also an Emmy Award-winning broadcast journalist and talk show personality.

He graduated from the Latin School of Chicago before attending the University of Colorado at Boulder and the University of Wisconsin at Madison. He concluded his studies at University of California, Los Angeles where he majored in television production before going on to join the writing staff of The Young and the Restless.

== Career ==
In 1987, Bell contributed to the creation and launch of The Bold and the Beautiful, currently the world's most popular daytime television soap opera with more than 45 broadcasters in over 110 countries, according to the Guinness Book of World Records. Bell was promoted to associate producer in 1989 and again to supervising producer in 1992. He has been the head writer and executive producer of the show since 1993 and 1995 respectively.

Show	Position	Start	End
The Bold and the Beautiful	Executive producer	January 12, 1996	present
The Bold and the Beautiful	Head writer	May 5, 1993	present
The Bold and the Beautiful	Supervising Producer	May 4, 1992	January 11, 1996
The Bold and the Beautiful	Breakdown/Script Writer	March 23, 1987	May 4, 1993
The Bold and the Beautiful	Associate producer	January 23, 1989	May 1, 1992
The Young and the Restless	Occasional Script Writer	1984	1986

== Awards ==
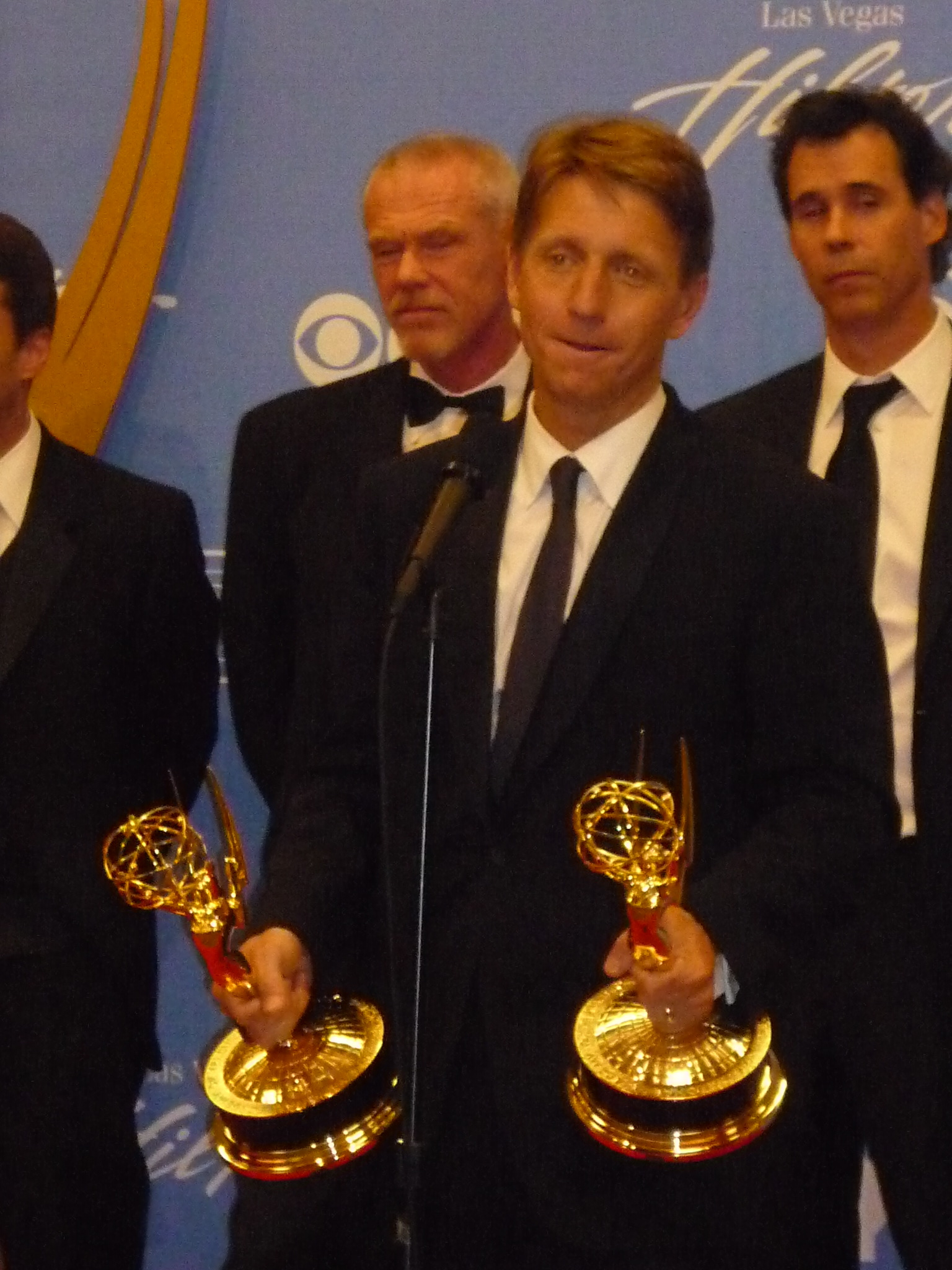
Bell at 2010 Daytime Emmy Awards

It wasn't until 2000 that Bradley Bell received his first Daytime Emmy Award nomination. By 2015, he has been awarded with Emmys for his writing in 2010, 2013, 2015 amongst 11 nominations (2000, 2003, 2006, 2007, 2008, 2009, 2010, 2011, 2013, 2014, 2015) and took home three statuettes for helming the Best Drama Series in a record three consecutive years in 2009, 2010, 2011 amongst 9 nominations (2003, 2004, 2007, 2009, 2010, 2011, 2013, 2014, 2015) in addition to two Emmy wins in other categories (new approaches and music composition).

On January 14, 2015, CBS Television City, celebrating 7000 episodes of The Bold and the Beautiful, dedicated Studio 31 to Bell in honor of his work since the first day of the series.

== Personal life ==
Bell married Colleen Clark Bradley in October 1991 and they have 4 children. They live in Holmby Hills, Los Angeles, California. According to the Center for Investigative Reporting, Bradley and Colleen Bell use "at least 2 million" gallons of water per year to irrigate their personal estate.

Bell's sister, Lauralee Bell is an actress best known for her role as Christine Blair on The Young and the Restless and The Bold and the Beautiful. Bell also has an older brother, Bill Bell, the president of Bell Dramatic Serial Company and Bell-Phillip Television Productions, Inc.

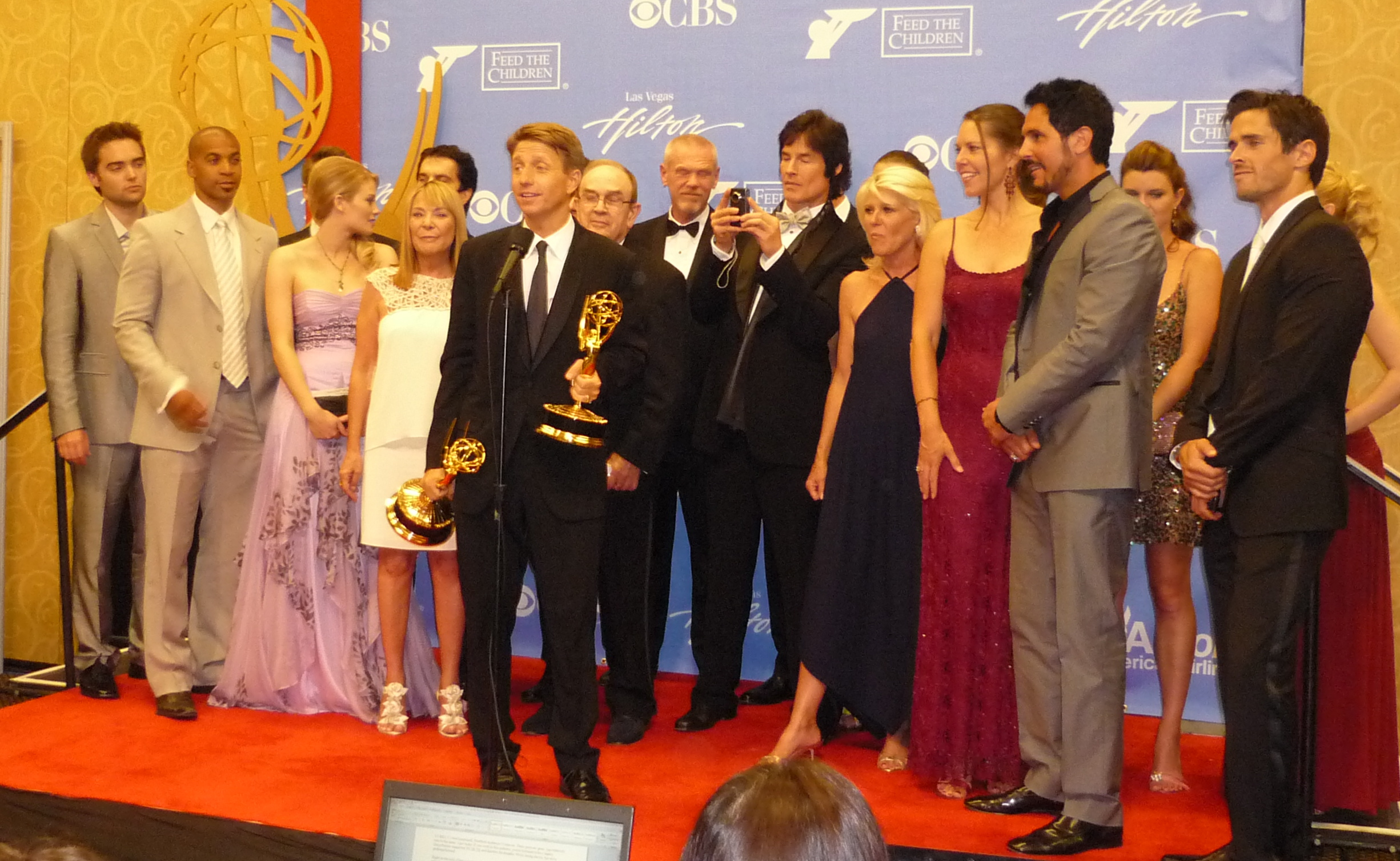
Cast and crew of soap opera "The Bold and the Beautiful" at 2010 Daytime Emmy Awards.

== Head writer ==
Preceded by William J. Bell	Head writer of The Bold and the Beautiful (with John F. Smith: May 5 – 18, 1993); May 5, 1993 – January 28, 2008	Succeeded by WGA Strike
Preceded by Kay Alden	Head writer of The Bold and the Beautiful (with Kay Alden: January 2, 2009 – October 2, 2013) (with Michael Minnis: January 2, 2009 – July 3, 2023); April 16, 2008 – July 3, 2023	Succeeded by Michael Minnis
Preceded by Michael Minnis	Head writer of The Bold and the Beautiful (with Michael Minnis); November 8, 2023 – present	Succeeded by Incumbent

== Executive producer ==
Preceded by William J. Bell and Lee Phillip Bell	Executive producer of The Bold and the Beautiful; January 12, 1996 – present	Succeeded by Incumbent
