= Maya Avant =

Fictional character from The Bold And The Beautiful

- The Bold and the Beautiful character
- Portrayed by: Karla Mosley
- Duration: 2013–2019
- First appearance: January 22, 2013
- Last appearance: May 30, 2019
- Created by: Bradley Bell and Michael Minnis
- Introduced by: Bradley Bell
In-universe information
- Other names: Maya Forrester; Myron Avant II
- Occupation: Model; Actress; Waitress
- Parents: Julius Avant; Vivienne Avant
- Sisters: Nicole Avant
- Half-sisters: Sasha Thompson
- Spouse: Rick Forrester (2015–2018)
- Daughters: Lizzy Forrester (legal)
- Grandparents: Myron Avant I
- Uncles: Claude Avant
- Aunts: Maisie Avant; Caroline; Carleen
- Nieces: Lizzy Forrester
- First cousins: Alexander Avant

Maya Avant is a fictional character from The Bold and the Beautiful, an American soap opera on the CBS network, portrayed by Karla Mosley. Introduced as a series regular in 2013, ex-con Maya comes to town looking for her daughter who was put up for adoption by Dayzee Forrester (Kristolyn Lloyd). After the child is revealed to have died, Maya falls for fashion executive Rick Forrester (Jacob Young) when she mistakes him for a waiter. Discovering Rick's true identity scares Maya into the arms of attorney Carter Walton (Lawrence Saint-Victor). Maya quickly rises to fame in the modeling world. After a failed engagement to Carter who realizes Maya loves Rick, Maya pursues Rick putting her at odds with Rick's then wife Caroline Spencer (Linsey Godfrey). After successfully breaking up the couple, Rick and Maya settle into their cushy new life ruffling quite a few feathers along the way as Maya supports Rick's ruthless business tactics.

Characterized by some critics as a "social climber" and a "gold digger", Maya becomes a popular "love to hate" character for viewers due to her schemes and manipulations in her attempts to get what she wants. Daytime Confidential specifically referred to Maya as the black version of the iconic All My Children character, Erica Kane (Susan Lucci). In 2015, Maya was revealed to be transgender, becoming the first regular transgender character in American daytime television. The story made headlines in several mainstream media outlets including USA Today, People magazine and several LGBT publications. Maya's presence on the typically conservative soap also allowed for the introduction of her family, the Avants, to become the first and only central African American family in the show's history.

== Storylines ==
Fresh out of prison, Maya comes to Los Angeles in early 2013 to confront Dayzee Leigh (Kristolyn Lloyd) demanding to know where her baby is. Maya is shocked to learn the child has died and Dayzee encourages Maya to leave town fearing Maya will upset her happy life with Marcus Forrester (Texas Battle), the adopted son of the Forrester family fashion dynasty. While volunteering at Dayzee's coffee shop in exchange for staying in the apartment upstairs, Maya falls for Rick Forrester (Jacob Young), believing he is a waiter. Maya notices Rick is unhappy with girlfriend Caroline Spencer (Linsey Godfrey) and tries to distract him. The two go window shopping on Rodeo Drive where they share their first kiss and when Maya is trying on gowns at the Forrester Creations boutique, she learns Rick's true identity and it scares her away. Maya finds comfort with Carter Walton (Lawrence Saint-Victor) which makes for an awkward first date at the Forrester mansion where Caroline makes sure to stake her claim on Rick. Maya turns down a second date with Carter and he assists her in getting Rick back. Rick and Maya's early romance is plagued by Caroline's interference and insults in which Caroline constantly refers to Maya by the wrong names. Maya is ecstatic when she gets cast in a movie role only to learn that it is an adult film. She turns the job down and Rick instead hires her as a spokesmodel for the company. Caroline taunts Maya about her inexperience leading to Rick hiring professionals to help train Maya. While he wants to be with Maya, Rick struggles with trying to let Caroline down easy and Maya pressures him to choose. Caroline refuses to accept that Rick is choosing Maya and her publishing mogul uncle, Bill Spencer (Don Diamont) threatens to send Maya back to prison if she doesn't stay away from Rick. Despite the threats, Maya continues seeing Rick and soon runs into her ex-boyfriend Jesse (Ricky Paull Goldin) thanks to Bill who knows that Maya being seen with Jesse could land her back in jail. Maya turns down a reunion with Jesse and is forced to tell him that their baby died. Bill threatens Maya with photographs of her encounter with Jesse and she confides in Carter and Rick about Bill's blackmail, leading to Rick officially breaking up with Caroline for Maya.

Maya is later hired by producer Rafael (Andy Zuno) to star opposite Carter in his web series, Room 8. However, the steamy romantic scenes lead to the two developing chemistry. Despite the obvious attraction, Maya remains faithful to Rick. During one particular scene, Maya hesitates and then discovers Rafael is in cahoots with Caroline to get Rick jealous enough to dump Maya. Rafael makes it up to Carter and Maya by having them shoot the series in its original incarnation. When Rick misses the Room 8 premiere in favor of work, Maya and Carter share a drink and kiss but she stops it from going any further. Having learned that Carter and Maya spent time together, Rick questions her loyalty despite Maya's assurances that nothing happened. Maya tries to reconcile with Rick only to find him with Caroline; Maya then ends the relationship and resigns from her modeling position at Forrester. Maya is shocked when Carter suddenly proposes and she accepts, believing she and Carter are a better fit for one another, like Caroline and Rick. While Carter discusses wedding plans, Maya pines for Rick and she is ready to confess until Rick and Caroline announce their engagement. Meanwhile, Carter convinces Rick to reinstate Maya at the company. Maya has seemingly made peace with the situation when Rick and Caroline marry in December 2013.

Throughout 2014, Maya becomes obsessed with photographer Oliver Jones's (Zack Conroy) intentions toward Rick's niece Aly Forrester (Ashlyn Pearce) when Oliver implies that he is using Aly to secure his job. As everyone grows suspicious of Maya's interest in Oliver and Aly, she confides in Oliver that she believes she, not Caroline, is the right woman for Rick. After Rick rejects her advances, Maya admits to Caroline that she fell for Carter on the rebound and just needed closure. Maya later reveals a recording where Oliver discusses using Aly to secure his job and a furious Carter dumps Maya when he confronts her about her obsession with acquiring status and prestige. Maya takes advantage of Caroline's growing closeness with Rick's stepbrother Ridge Forrester (Thorsten Kaye) and plants suspicions in the minds of Rick and Ridge's fiancée, Katie Logan (Heather Tom) about Caroline and Ridge's relationship. Maya later exposes Ridge and Caroline during a board meeting forcing Caroline to admit to sharing a few kisses with Ridge. A devastated Rick turns to Maya, they make love and Maya later convinces Rick to accept to CEO position from his father Eric Forrester (John McCook) despite Eric initially choosing Ridge over him. Rick and Maya soon move in together and Rick appoints Maya as the lead model at Forrester Creations. A confident Maya orders Carter to serve Caroline with annulment papers on Rick's behalf despite warnings that Rick still loves Caroline. Maya is shocked when Rick suddenly announces that he is going back to Caroline as Eric is threatening to remove him as CEO. Though she is unhappy, Rick assures Maya he wants a future with her.

In 2015, Rick tricks Eric into signing a document giving him irrevocable control of the company for a year and Rick publicly announces the end of his marriage to be with Maya. Maya is shocked when Rick moves her into the Forrester mansion and replaces a portrait of deceased matriarch Stephanie Forrester (Susan Flannery) with a portrait of Maya instead. As Maya gloats about her victory, she is reminded that Rick has yet to profess his love for her. Thanks to Maya's insistence, Rick confesses his love for her and flaunts the relationship to Caroline. Bill resorts to threats again as Maya reluctantly welcomes her younger sister Nicole (Reign Edwards) into her life. Despite feeling uneasy at times, Maya continuously supports Rick as he spirals out of control manipulating and belittling Aly and even going so far as to shoot at Ridge and Caroline when he finds them kissing. Meanwhile, Nicole blackmails dangling a major secret over her head in exchange for several perks. With Carter's help, Maya learns Nicole has dropped out of college and tries to use it as leverage against her sister. However, Maya is stunned when Nicole confronts Maya about the fact that she is transgender. Maya confesses all to Nicole including that her daughter was actually Jesse's child whom Maya had gained custody of before being sent to prison. Though Nicole pressures her to confess, Maya warns that she needs to make that decision for herself. Maya is terrified when an angry Carter confronts her about being transgender having overheard a confrontation with Nicole and threatens to expose her. Maya apologizes for not being honest with him and talks Carter down. Later, Maya promises to come clean if Rick proposes. Maya is rightfully concerned when Nicole starts spending time with Bill's son Wyatt (Darin Brooks) and Nicole admits that she confided in Wyatt about Maya being transgender. As the gossip spreads throughout the company, Rick's mother Brooke Logan (Katherine Kelly Lang) demands that Maya come clean with her son immediately.

Rick finally proposes to Maya in a romantic mountain getaway and Maya tells Rick about being transgender just as Bill leaks the news to the press. When Maya believes Rick is embarrassed by her, she runs away in her car and Rick follows. As Maya questions if Rick still wants to marry her over the phone, the call disconnects, leading Maya to believe Rick has rejected her, although Rick has actually crashed his car. Maya resigns from her modeling position and hides out in her apartment where she reconciles with Nicole, who apologizes for telling Wyatt. As Maya is about to leave town for good, Rick tells her wants to be with her and she thanks him for defending her against Bill. After Rick is ousted as CEO by Ridge and his children, the public outcry for Maya's return leads to them both returning to the company. Maya is very uneasy when her parents, Vivienne (Anna Maria Horsford) and Julius (Obba Babatundé) come to rescue Nicole from Maya's influence. Maya becomes the central figure of the company's California Freedom line and Rick proposes to her during the fashion show and she happily accepts. On her wedding day, Maya is devastated when she overhears Julius referring to the event as a "freak show" and Maya has second thoughts. But Nicole convinces her to enjoy her day despite Julius. Maya confronts Julius at the altar and when he admits he has not accepted Maya's transition, she ask him to leave while Vivienne stays behind. Maya and Rick are happily married on August 12, 2015. After their honeymoon, Rick and Maya settle into married life and confides in him that she's ready to start a family. Instead of adoption, Maya asks Nicole to be their surrogate so the child will be both a Forrester and an Avant. The couple are ecstatic when Nicole agrees to the surrogacy but Julius and Vivienne disapprove, fearing it will ruin Nicole's budding romance with Rick's nephew, Zende Forrester (Rome Flynn).

In 2016, Maya and Rick leave the Forrester mansion after Ridge removes Maya's portrait. Meanwhile, Maya comes to Nicole's defense after she splits with Zende. who struggles to accept the pregnancy. Maya and Rick later set out to dig up dirt on Ridge as leverage. Nicole has the baby and Rick and Maya decide to name her Elizabeth "Lizzy" Nicole Forrester, after Rick's maternal grandmother, Beth Logan, and Nicole. In 2018, Rick and Maya divorce, obtaining joint custody of Lizzie.

== Development ==
=== Casting and creation ===
Michael Logan of TV Guide announced the casting of Karla Mosley and her former Guiding Light co-star, Lawrence Saint-Victor in December 2012. Mosley got her start on the Emmy nominated children's program Hi-5 as part of the band of the same name. Mosley made her first appearance on January 22, 2013 on a contractual basis. Mosley's character is a woman from Skid Row who shares a past with Dayzee Forrester (Kristolyn Lloyd). Mosley revealed that she was in Los Angeles and set to return to New York City for Thanksgiving in November 2012 when she was contacted by her agents about series producer and head writer Brad Bell and director Christy Dooley's interest in her. They praised Mosley's work as Christina on Guiding Light and offered her the chance to play "someone who's a little edgier." Mosley immediately "jumped at the chance."

=== Archetypes and characterization ===
Unlike most of the archetypal portrayals of transgender characters on television at the time, Maya has already completed her transition and is living her life. While Maya is the third transgender character in daytime history preceded by supermodel Azure (Carlotta Chang) of The City and All My Children glam rocker Zoe Luper (Jeffrey Carlson) who falls in love with resident lesbian Bianca Montgomery (Eden Riegel) -- she is the first transgender character to be featured as a series regular on American Daytime television. The British soap Coronation Street established the very first regular transgender character in serialized drama in 1998 when the series introduced Hayley Cropper (Julie Hesmondhalgh). The 1991 film Soapdish which famously satirized the world of daytime featured the exposure of a transgender actress live on camera. Though scripted television featuring gay, lesbian and bisexual characters had become common in recent years, "transgender characters continue to lag behind" according to GLAAD's director of communications, Nick Adams. At the time of the reveal, "Maya Avant is currently the only transgender character on broadcast and cable television." Adding to the character's unique position, Maya is also a trans woman of color working in the fashion industry. Stories for transgender characters usually featured the character coming out and then transitioning. Shows like Orange Is the New Black and Transparent regularly featured transgender characters but neither series on aired broadcast network television. Meanwhile, Fox's Glee introduced a storyline in its final season that featured a character coming out as transgender and making the transition. Mosley is also the first actress in a transgender role to be touted as her show's "leading lady." Maya and Rick's split after the reveal leads many to question the character's longevity. However, showrunner Bradley Bell declared "Karla Mosley has emerged as the leading lady of B&B, and she'll remain so." Maya becomes the first transgender bride in American daytime television history when she marries Rick Forrester (Jacob Young) in August 2015.

In an interview with Soap Opera Digest in April 2013, Mosley said "Maya is a force of nature." Maya has big dreams "but she's naive in a lot of ways" said the actress. Maya is very "trusting, or she has been." However, Maya's "Achilles' heel is these men who come into her life. She falls in love easily and she often gets burned." Mosley described Maya as being a "very rational person, for the most part." "It's so much, but I have to sometimes make sure I read the scripts in advance, because a lot of times, I'll read them and almost get a stomachache from the decisions she's about to make. I'll be like, 'Oh, Maya! I feel like in my own life, I do everything I can to avoid drama. And so then to play this character who literally walks around starting fires every where she goes is really counterintuitive." Mosley who initially questioned if Maya's transgender status should affect her portrayal revealed to the Daily News that "it has really given me more layers and has really deepened my understanding of who she is." According to Brad Bell, after being shunned by her family, "Maya became ornery and self-absorbed." She had to become a "real fighter."

=== Transgender reveal and advocacy ===
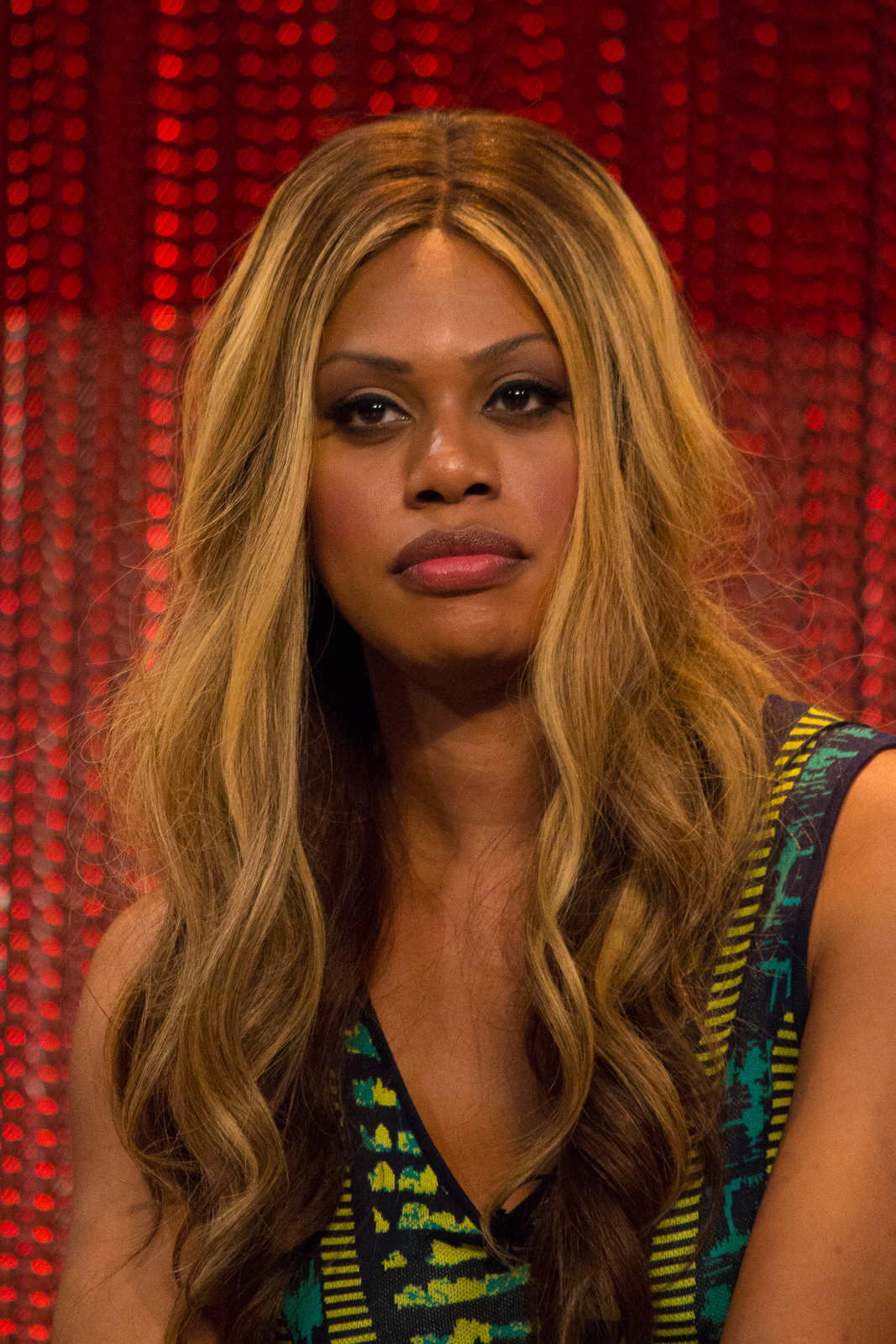
Executive producer and head writer Bradley Bell drew inspiration from real-life figures such transgender actress Laverne Cox (above) and also U.S. Olympic Gold medalist and television personality Caitlyn Jenner.

"It is about people respecting other people's differences and their uniqueness... In the end, we all want to be loved, and in order to love someone else you first have to love yourself. If you are transgender, gay, straight, it doesn't matter. It's about finding love in life. This is a love story."

— Bradley Bell on the story's purpose.

In December 2014, Soap Opera Digest exclusively reported that Reign Edwards had been cast in the role of Nicole Avant — Maya's younger sister. Nicole's January arrival displays quite a bit of tension between the estranged siblings because Nicole feels abandoned and Maya's secrets slowly start to unravel. There was some initial speculation among viewers that Nicole could have been Maya's daughter. Meanwhile, others had jokingly guessed the transgender angle. On March 18, 2015, without any prior announcement about the storyline, it is revealed that Maya was actually born Myron and is transgender.

A thrilled Karla Mosley revealed that she was informed of her character's big secret shortly after Christmas in 2014. "My first reaction was surprise" Mosley said to USA Today noting that "10 or 20 years ago, this is not a story we would be telling, and not in a way that's truthful and not sensational." Mosley expressed her gratitude for the opportunity to portray such a storyline. As the story took shape, Mosley did her own research by reading transgender activist Janet Mock's memoir and also going straight to those with firsthand experience; "I have a couple of friends who have transitioned" Mosley revealed. The actress wanted to be as educated on the subject as possible so she could portray Maya in the "most truthful and authentic way." During an interview with On-Air On-Soaps, Mosley admitted to being a bit more protective over story development because of the importance of the topic. "I have had to be more firm on things than I have been in the past, because you want to tell the story, and you want to tell it right" Mosley stated. Like many others, Mosley herself questioned why the series didn't hire a transgender actress to portray Maya. Mosley concluded that having viewers come to know and love "or love to hate her" in the role helped because "there is another emotion that comes up for some viewers" who may be turned off by Maya being transgender. "We are then forced to look at why?" While Maya is the main focus of the story, "It's not just Maya's story" Karla Mosley insisted. The story also examines the reactions of those Maya has formed relationships with including Rick, Nicole and her ex-boyfriend Carter Walton (Saint-Victor), and later Maya's own parents. "So even if people have trouble relating to what Maya is going through, they might be able to see themselves in the reaction" of Maya's loved ones. In June 2015, Michael Logan announced that veteran actors Anna Maria Horsford and Obba Babatundé had been cast in the role of Maya's estranged parents, Vivienne and Julius Avant and who have come rescue Nicole from Maya's influence. The arrival of the Avants makes way for viewers "see how Maya became the woman she is today amidst many obstacles and prejudices." The reunion is the first time Maya has contact with parents since before she her "surgical transition" from Myron.

Executive producer and head writer Bradley Bell revealed that the story came about because he wanted to "present [Mosley] with something very dramatic, something timely and topical, and I wanted her to have a secret and I thought about if she was transgender from the very beginning and I got very excited." Though he admitted to being a "little bit concerned" about potential backlash, Bell said, "We need to take minds that have been closed and open them up a little." Bell seemed to relish in touching on a transgender story from such a fresh perspective. "It's a new story, because the ability to do this wasn't around 20 years ago" he said. "A big part of the story is her being transgender with the man she loves" Bell said. He continued, "I'm curious to see how he reacts." The story provides an "in-depth look at disclosure: the right and appropriate time to say something. When is waiting too long, when is too early?" The producers partnered with the GLAAD organization to craft the story. Representatives from the organization sat in on story meetings and helped to review scripts. GLAAD director Nick Adams was actually very hands-on in the writing process as far as helping to get the terminology correct. After the reveal when Maya reclaims her position as the face of Forrester Creations, the fictional company holds a fashion show featuring transgender models. Bell said the episodes which aired on July 16 and July 17, "speaks to our continued commitment to Maya's story and to the transgender community." Brad Bell insisted that Mosley would be "front and center" as "the star of our show. We are not going to be doing this story around the edges." He continued, "We're digging deep in this story, every facet and avenue." Bell described it as "experimental TV". Whether it's done right or wrong, "People will object to it." The story features transgender actors in recurring and guest-star roles. The lead-up to Maya's confession to Rick and her public exposure feature trans actor Scott Turner Schofield in the role of Nick, Maya's close friend and mentor.

=== Relationships and disclosure ===
The character first develops a romance with Rick Forrester (Young), who is volunteering as a waiter at the local coffee house Dayzee's. Maya assumes he is homeless. "I think Maya brings out something in Rick that fans aren't used to seeing" Mosley said of the relationship. In March 2013, it was announced the series had cast Ricky Paull Goldin as Maya's jealous ex-boyfriend, Jesse. With Rick's ex-girlfriend Caroline Spencer (Linsey Godfrey) still pursuing him, Rick and Maya start dating and Jesse threatens that new relationship. "He's absolutely the last person" Maya expects to see. According to Mosley, Maya sacrificed so much for Jesse "that she lost her freedom." Though she should be angry Jesse is still a man she fell for and had a child with. The relationship is also plagued by Maya's insecurities. For Maya, Rick is the "fairy tale." "Maya is really in love with Rick" but she feels insecure about him working so closely with Caroline. Rick is not supportive enough. At the same time, she falls for Carter Walton (Lawrence Saint-Victor) who "consistently supportive" Mosley said. For Maya, Carter is a "good guy" and he is her "good friend" first. For the first time, Maya is reminded how different she and Rick actually are when he isn't there for her. Maya and Carter become engaged in September 2013 but when Maya constantly tries to hold off wedding plans, they split up because she still loves Rick.

"Their love for each other comes from them both being victims in life" Mosley said of Rick and Maya's relationship. She described the couple as "open-hearted people, who then have had to guard their hearts from being disappointed." She continued, "But they are also connected, because they are assholes!" Mosley spoke with People magazine about the disclosure episode which aired on May 15, 2015, in which Maya finally confesses to Rick that she is transgender. "This is the scene, I think, we've all been preparing for – both as actors and as an audience." It being the "first time Maya has chosen to disclose to someone she loves" heightens the stakes. Though being so vulnerable scares her, "Ultimately Maya trusts Rick" and "she loves him enough to risk everything -- including letting down some of the walls she's built up to protect herself -- in order to be with him a healthy way." Mosley explained that Maya's trepidation about revealing that she is transgender stemmed from her being afraid to lose Rick—fearing he would leave her for Caroline. Of Rick and Maya's reunion after Maya discloses her transgender status, Brad Bell said "This is a really fresh and unique love story, and we're only just beginning." While soap couples do not last forever, Bell said "Right now we're concentrating on developing a strong foundation for Rick and Maya" one than can "be respected and admired. But trouble will come. It always does." Rick's unconditional love softens Maya's hardened persona.

=== Exit ===
In October 2020, Mosley announced her exit from the role. In a post on social media, she stated: "Celebrating the incredible journey of #MayaAvant! And bidding a fond farewell to her with gratitude to all of YOU for watching. More to come from me – stay tuned to my IG! ♥️." In March 2025, Mosley further explained her exit, stating she felt "it really became truly inappropriate for me to play that role." She said she initially turned the role down because it felt inappropriate as a cisgender female to play a transgender character.

== Reception ==
"For years we've complained on the Daytime Confidential podcast that The Bold and the Beautiful—a soap set in the fashion industry–featured hardly any LGBT characters. With this plot twist, Brad Bell has addressed his show's diversity issues and transformed Maya into oh-so-much more than The Black Erica Kane."

— Luke Kerr on the transgender twist.

The character of Maya has mostly been well received by critics and Mosley has received critical praise for her portrayal. Jamey Giddens praised the writers for Maya's scheming nature and also praised Mosley for her portrayal of the character. The reveal that Maya is transgender made headlines everywhere, not only in the soap press, but in mainstream media as well as major publications for the LGBT community. "I did not realize we were going to get this kind of traction" Brad Bell said of the reaction. Mosley received a lot of feedback through social media with some being able to identify with the story first hand. Mosley revealed that the storyline helped one particular viewer reconnect with their own transgender child after 20 years of estrangement. The reveal left many shocked and most raved about the story decision. Kevin Mulcahy, Jr. of We Love Soaps said the series "has been consistently excellent over the past few years but the show topped itself today with the reveal of Maya Avant's (Karla Mosley) secret." David Miller from Serial Scoop said "What a fantastic, and shocking, cliffhanger! Luke Kerr said "A creative earthquake shook Los Angeles and The Bold and the Beautiful to their core on Thursday." Kerr also praised Mosley for her portrayal. New York Daily News described the plot as The Bold and the Beautiful's "boldest step ever." Jean Bentley of Us Weekly described the plot as "groundbreaking" and exclaimed "Talk about a twist!" TheWrap described the reaction as a "social media frenzy" with viewers responding in shock and some with the help of hilarious memes. The character's name also trended on Twitter in the United States after the reveal. CBS Soaps In Depth said the series "broke unexpected ground" with the reveal. SoapCentral said "The Bold and the Beautiful sent shock waves through the soap opera community and beyond." "Everything was on point" said Tim Teeman of The Daily Beast.

While soaps have often featured "earth shattering" secrets that proved to be "lackluster at best", "This was not at all the case when it came to the bomb Nicole Avant had been sitting on since she strolled into Beverly Hills", Ashley Dionne of TVSource Magazine said. The reveal scenes "were something to be seen and seen again." Dionne praised the acting and said the "flawless portrayal of a flawed character like Maya by Karla Mosley is nothing new." "The news of this shocker spread through media outlets faster than I could rewind my DVR to make sure I heard it correctly." Dionne said the reveal "quickly became the most talked about moment on TV that day." However, Dionne, like many others immediately questioned how much of the character's history would need to be "rewritten" to make the story work. She continued, "I found the move to be just as the title of the touts, Bold." Tim Surette of TV Guide admitted that the plot twist on soaps had become quite "common," and "the writers of The Bold and the Beautiful took the show's later shocker to a whole new level. And you know what? Good for them." People magazine said "After 28 years on the air, Bold and the Beautiful just aired its most genuinely unexpected twist yet."

The storyline earned Bold a GLAAD Media Award nomination for Outstanding Daily Drama and the series was the only daily drama included in the category for the year. Viewers and critics alike were shocked and angry when Mosley was excluded from the Daytime Emmy nominations. On-Air On-Soaps said Mosley was one of the more noticeable absences. Daytime Confidential described Mosley's exclusion as a "baffling snub."

In 2020, Candace Young and Charlie Mason from Soaps She Knows put Maya on their list of Daytime's Most Important African-American Characters and criticised her departure, commenting that "On any given day, Karla Mosley's mercurial model could be a put-upon heroine or a plot-hatching vixen. But what she'll most vividly be remembered for is the ground she broke in 2015 when it was revealed that she was a transgender woman. How the show lost interest in and dispatched a character that complex, we'll never understand." In 2022, Mason placed Maya 15th on his ranked list of The Bold and the Beautiful's Best of the Best Characters Ever, commenting "One of daytime's first frontburner transgender characters, Karla Mosley's alter ego broke barriers and paved the way for… well, we're still waiting to see, actually, and would happily settle for a storyline for Rick's ex-wife!"
