= Jenn Korbee =

American actress

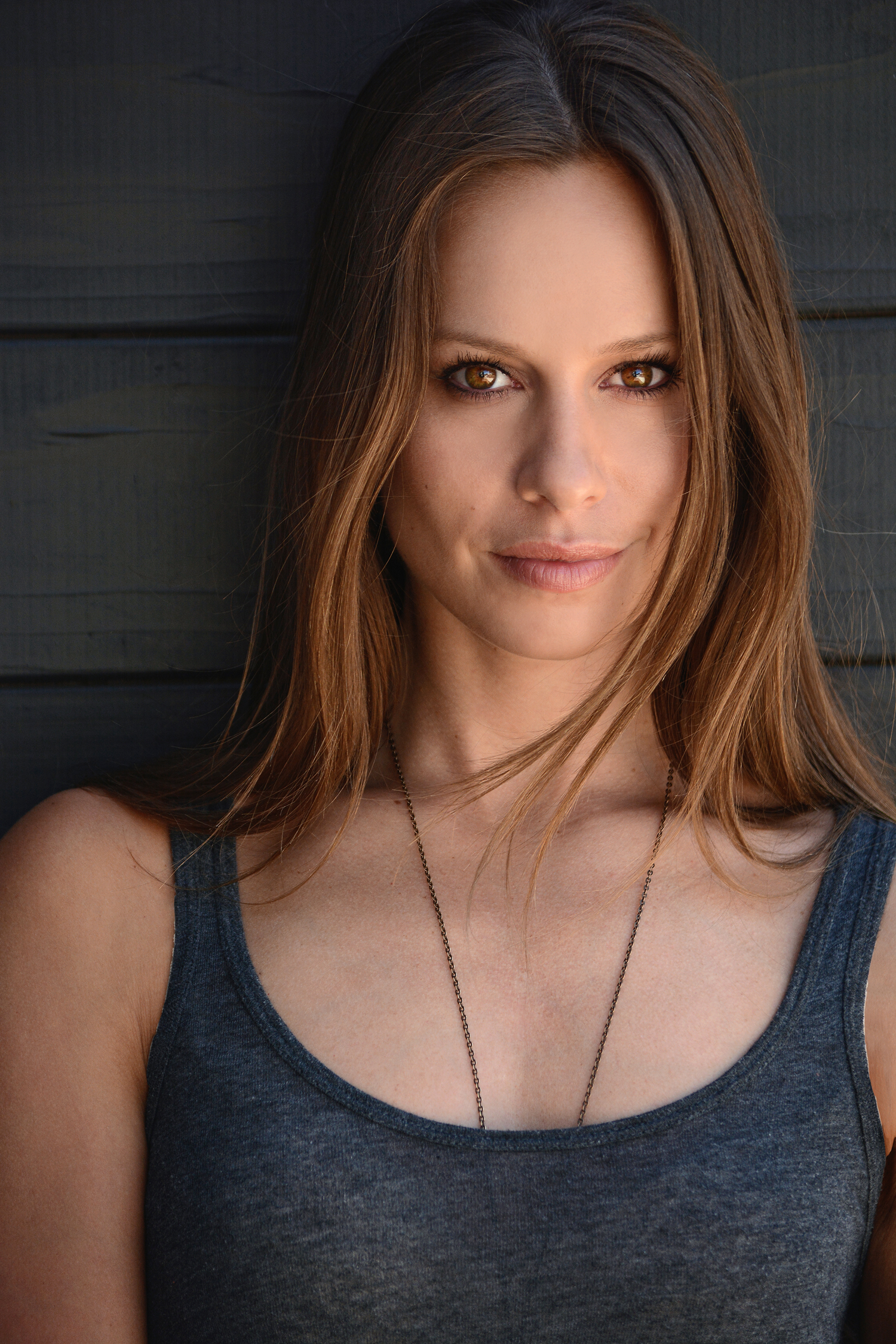
- Korbee in 2021
- Occupations: Singer; actress
- Years active: 2003–present
- Spouse: Tom Korbee (m. 2006)
- Website: jennkorbee.com

Jenn Korbee is an American singer and actress.

== Biography ==
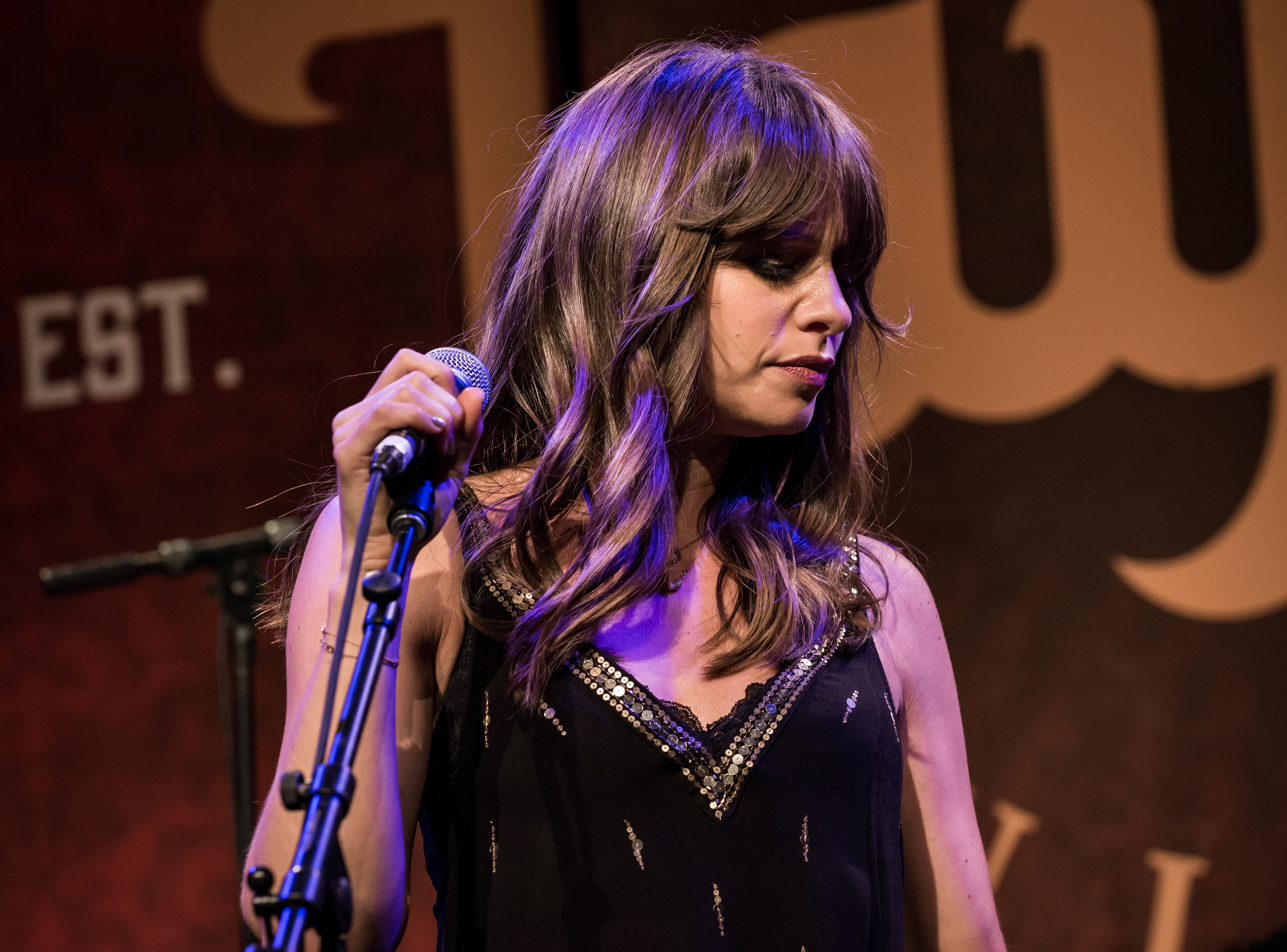
Korbee performing in 2017

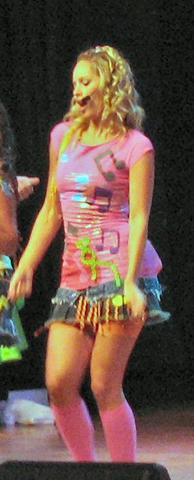
Korbee performs at a Hi-5 concert

Korbee was cast in a regional production of the Off-Broadway musical The Marvelous Wonderettes.

In 2003, Korbee was cast in the children's show Hi-5 in the role of her nickname "Jenn". The show was filmed in Sydney, Australia. Other cast members include Kimee Balmilero, Karla Cheatham Mosley, Curtis Cregan, and Shaun Taylor-Corbett. Korbee has been cast as Cathy in the musical adaptation of Wuthering Heights, written by Mark Ryan. She has also appeared in productions of the professional regional theatre company American Folklore Theatre.

Korbee and her husband Tom participated on the eighth season of American Idol as the first married couple to make it to Hollywood; Tom was eliminated at the end of group round, while she was eliminated at the final judgment following a sing-off with Kristen McNamara.

She appeared as the newscaster in the 2011 film Judy Moody and the Not Bummer Summer starring Heather Graham.

She and her husband Tom formed the duo Korbee. In 2016, the duo's single 'Hey Child', produced by David Garcia and executive produced by Mark Endert, debuted to over 5M streams on Spotify.

== Discography ==
Her duo, Korbee, released single 'Hey Child' produced by David Garcia and Mark Endert which debuted to over 5 million streams on Spotify.

== Filmography ==
Television roles
Year	Title	Role	Notes
2003	Hack	Zoe	
2003–2007	Hi-5	Presenter	Seasons 1 to 2
2010	Accidentally on Purpose	Penelope	
2011	CSI: Miami	Date #1 ("Match made in hell", Season 9, Episode 10)	
2012	Up All Night	Charlotte	
2012	Criminal Minds	Francesca	
2012	Franklin & Bash	Sasha	

Film roles
Year	Title	Role
2011	Judy Moody and the Not Bummer Summer	Newscaster
2013	Four of Hearts	Jessica
