= Yasmeen Sulieman =

American singer and Broadway actress (born 1982)

- Born: May 18, 1982 (age 44); Oakland, California, US
- Occupations: Actor; Singer

Yasmeen Sulieman (born May 19, 1982) is an American singer and Broadway actress born in Oakland, California and raised in Hawaii. She is best known for her 2002 R&B single "Blue Jeans" in addition to her successful work in the Tony Award-winning Broadway musical Beautiful: The Carole King Musical which she joined in 2014.

== Biography ==
Sulieman was born in Oakland, California, where she lived in until she was 7, when her parents moved the family including her actor brother (Sterling Sulieman) to Oahu, Hawaii. Despite singing since she was young, Sulieman was inspired to follow her interest in music by a close cousin. Her father, Jameel Sulieman, now a doctor while he worked at the hospital, played drums in several bands while in college. She joined several local choirs and graduated to community and musical theatre at age 11. In high school, she won a statewide talent competition called "Brown Bags," with a moving interpretation of Celine Dion's "Love Is on the Way" which in turn resulted in an independent single release in 1999.

=== Career ===
Following the break from her independent single, Sulieman soon signed with Magic Johnson's record label, Magic Johnson Music/MCA Records. She began work on her debut album with producers/songwriters such as Diane Warren, Derek Bramble, Novel and Jazze Pha, which was a two-year process. The album's lead single "Blue Jeans" was produced by Jazze Pha and released in April 2002. It collected positive reviews and peaked at No. 53 on the Billboard R&B chart and No. 97 on Billboard Hot 100. A remix featuring Wu-Tang Clan member Ghostface Killah was released and gained radio airplay. Alongside that single, she performed a rendition of "The Star-Spangled Banner" at a WNBA Los Angeles Sparks basketball game to cheering applause.

Her debut album, When Will It Be Me was released in September 2002 in Japan. The album wasn't released in the United States due to record label issues.

In early 2005, she appeared on an in-show music competition on the UPN TV series Half & Half called "The Half & Half FastTrak" as one of five finalists selected by Jimmy Jam and Terry Lewis. Sulieman didn't win, and she earned the role of Chiffon in the touring musical Little Shop of Horrors later that year.

In August 2006, when Karla Cheatham Mosley announced that she was leaving the Discovery Kids children's television series Hi-5 to pursue other interests, Sulieman took over her place.

In 2009, she signed with Strictly Rhythm/Defected Records and has recorded a few dance singles with various DJs. She has released three singles, Ready Or Not, Gone and Rise to date on the label. In 2012, she joined Erik Machado (a.k.a. Alias Rhythm) as a duo titled Rose Rouge and they released an EP called "Steady."

In 2014, she joined the cast of Broadway's Beautiful: The Carole King Musical as part of the ensemble. She also appears on the cast recording which was released on May 13, 2014 which won a Grammy-award the following year.

In 2017, she released a new single with Sonny Fodera called "Caught Up" on February 17, 2017.

=== Influences ===
Her influences include Whitney Houston, Toni Braxton, Michael Jackson, Mariah Carey, Luther Vandross, opera, alternative, rock, pop, reggae and traditional Hawaiian music.

== Discography ==
=== Albums ===
- "When Will It Be Me" (2002) (September 2, 2002)

=== EPs ===
- "Steady" (as Rose Rouge with Erik Machado a.k.a. Alias Rhythm) (September 25, 2012)

=== Singles ===
- "Love Is On the Way"/"You Don't Have to Cry" (January 4, 1999)
- "Blue Jeans" (April 23, 2002)
- "Ready Or Not" (June 23, 2009)
- "Gone" (November 18, 2009)
- "Rise" (w/Danism) (July 12, 2011)

=== Collaborations ===
- "Glad I Found You" (w/DJ Gomi) (December 12, 2007)
- "Everything" (with DJ Gomi) (August 2, 2008)
- "Sun Will Shine" (w/Studio Apartment) (February 9, 2009)
- "Tell U Y" (w/ATFC) (March 17, 2009)
- "When We're Together" (w/Morjac & Fred Falke) (April 10, 2009)
- "Love" (w/Sandy Rivera) (March 28, 2011)
- "Whatever May Come" (w/My Digital Enemy & Jason Chance) (May 21, 2012)
- "Set Me Free" (with Maxime Zarcone) (July 25, 2012)
- "We Are Tomorrow" (with Pete Tha Zouk & Deepblue) (August 19, 2012)
- "Loving You" (with Kenny Summit & Director's Cut) (October 29, 2012)
- "Say My Name" (with Copyright) (April 26, 2013)
- "Caught Up" (with Sonny Fodera) (February 17, 2017)
