= Taylor-Corbett =

Taylor-Corbett is a surname. Notable people with the surname include:

- Lynne Taylor-Corbett (1956–2025), American choreographer, director, lyricist, and composer
- Shaun Taylor-Corbett (born 1978), American actor, singer, and writer, son of Lynne
