= Jennifer Gambatese =

American actress and singer (born 1975)

Jenn Gambatese
- Born: Jennifer Gambatese; September 10, 1975 (age 50); Cleveland, Ohio, U.S.
- Education: New York University (BA)
- Occupations: Actress; Dancer; Singer
- Years active: 1998–present
- Spouse: Curtis Cregan (m. 2007)
- Children: 2

Jenn Gambatese (born September 10, 1975) is an American actress and singer. Gambatese originated the role of Jane in the original Broadway production of Disney's Tarzan. Gambatese also played Glinda on the first National Tour of Wicked.

== Early life and education ==
Gambatese was born in Philadelphia, Mississippi, and grew up in Richmond Heights, a suburb of Cleveland. Her passion for acting began during the summer of fourth grade at the Willoughby Fine Arts Center where she attended theater classes. Her first performance was "playing a 'whitewasher'" in the story of Tom Sawyer. She continued taking acting classes, and in her senior year of high school attended Beck Center as well as Cleveland State University. In 1993 she moved to Manhattan, where she enrolled in the drama department at New York University Tisch School of the Arts. She graduated in 1997 with a double major in sociology and drama and received an "Artist & Scholar" award. After graduation her first professional job was performing with Theatre for Young Audiences, a touring children's theater company. She played Serena Katz in the North American Tour of Fame with Gavin Creel as Nick Piazza. She also played the role in a European Tour of the show.

== Theatre credits ==
Year	Title	Role	Notes	Ref.
	Sunday in the Park with George	Dot	Student production at NYU	
	Uncle Vanya	Sonya	Student production at NYU	
1998	Footloose	Urleen; Ariel u/s	Broadway	
1999	Romeo and Juliet the Musical	Juliet	Regional	
2000	Little Women	Amy March	Workshop	
2001	Reefer Madness	Mary Lane u/s	Off-Broadway	
	Devil in the Flesh	Marthe	York Theatre developmental production	
2002	Hairspray	Penny Pingleton	Broadway	
2003	A Year with Frog and Toad	Bird/Mouse/Squirrel/Mole/Young Frog	Broadway	
2005	All Shook Up	Natalie Haller	Broadway	
2006	Tarzan	Jane Porter	Broadway	
2007	Is He Dead?	Marie Leroux	Broadway	
2008	Little House on the Prairie	Mary Ingalls	Regional (Guthrie Theater)	
2010	Annie Get Your Gun	Annie Oakley	Regional (Goodspeed Opera House)	
2012	Carousel	Carrie Pipperidge	Regional (Goodspeed Opera House)	
2013	Wicked	Glinda	First U.S. national tour	
2014	The Sound of Music	Maria Rainer	Regional (Lyric Opera of Chicago)	
2016	School of Rock: The Musical	Principal Rosalie Mullins	Broadway	
2019	Mrs. Doubtfire	Miranda Hillard	Pre-Broadway tryout (5th Avenue Theatre)	
2021	Mrs. Doubtfire	Miranda Hillard	Broadway	

== Broadway performances ==
Gambatese made her Broadway debut in Footloose in October 1998. She played the role of Urleen and also as an understudy to the female lead actress. "Footloose" was directed by Walter Bobbie and ran on Broadway from October 2, 1998 through July 2, 2000. Gambatese followed "Footloose" with the musical Hairspray, directed by Jack O’Brien that ran on Broadway from August 2002 through January 2009. She played the role of Penny Pingleton. In April 2003, Gambatese appeared in a new Broadway musical, A Year with Frog and Toad, directed by David Petrarca; Gambatese played several roles: Bird, Mouse, Squirrel, and Young Frog. In March 2005, Gambatese played the role of Natalie Haller in the musical All Shook Up, directed by Christopher Ashley. In 2006, Gambetese played "Jane" in Tarzan, which played on Broadway from May 2006 through July 2007 at the Richard Rodgers Theatre. Next, Gambatese played Marie Leroux in "Is He Dead," a play by Mark Twain adapted by David Ives and directed by Michael Blakemore, that opened at the Lyceum Theatre in December 2007.

On August 9, 2016, she succeeded Sierra Boggess as Principal Rosalie Mullins in the Broadway production of School of Rock.

== Television and film ==
- Played "Woman in Bar" in Robert De Niro's The Good Shepherd, but her part was edited out of the final cut
- All My Children in 2005 as herself
- Featured on the cast recordings of Broadway musicals Tarzan and All Shook Up, which are currently on iTunes

== Personal life ==
She married Curtis Cregan, who was a member of a children’s television show Hi-5 and also a Broadway performer. They wed in June 2007. In January 2009, it was announced that she and her husband were expecting their first child together in May 2009. On May 12, 2009, they welcomed a daughter, Josephine. She likes to keep active by practicing yoga and bike riding as well as playing on the field as second base with her Broadway Show League.

When she is not in Manhattan she likes to spend time with her family in their home in the Catskill Mountains.
