= Hi-5 (American TV series) =

Children's musical group and television program

- Genre: Preschool
- Based on: Hi-5 by Helena Harris; Posie Graeme-Evans
- Directed by: Ian Munro; Rob Cotterill
- Presented by: Kimee Balmilero; Curtis Cregan; Jennifer Korbee; Karla Cheatham Mosley; Shaun Taylor-Corbett
- Opening theme: "Hi-5 Theme"
- Ending theme: "Hi-5 Closing Theme"
- Composer: Chris Harriott
- Country of origin: United States
- Original language: English
- No. of seasons: 2
- No. of episodes: 70

Production
- Executive producers: Kris Noble (season 1); Helena Harris (season 2)
- Producer: Helena Harris (season 1)
- Running time: 22 minutes
- Production companies: Kids Like Us; Nine Films and Television

Original release
- Network: Discovery Kids; TLC
- Release: February 24, 2003 – October 6, 2006

Related
- Hi-5 (Australian TV series)

Hi-5, also known as Hi-5 USA, is an American children's television series produced by Kids Like Us for Discovery Kids. It also aired on TLC, on the Ready Set Learn! programming blocks of both networks. It is based on the original Australian series of the same name, created by Helena Harris and Posie Graeme-Evans, and was filmed and produced in Australia. The program is known for its educational content and pop music appeal, with the cast of the show known collectively as Hi-5. The series premiered on February 24, 2003, and was nominated for three Emmy Awards.

== Format ==
Hi-5 is a variety-style series for pre-schoolers that features music as an integral part of its premise. The program features five presenters who are collectively known as Hi-5, who perform songs as a group as well as present individual segments.

The Puzzles and Patterns segment focuses on logical thinking and mathematics, with a puppet named Jup Jup. Jup Jup is used to help complete puzzles or solve problems. The presenter of the segment Body Move encourages children to participate in movement and dance to develop physical coordination and motor development. Linguistics and aural skills are at the center of the Word Play segment. Word Play features a puppet named Chatterbox, who assists in the exploration of language through stories and rhymes. Shapes in Space focuses on visual and spatial awareness using shapes, color, and everyday materials such as boxes and play dough. Musicality is explored through Making Music, with an emphasis on pitch, rhythm, beat, melody, and using a variety of real and pretend instruments. With the exception of Episode 31, the final segment, in which the cast comes together, is entitled Sharing Stories. In this segment, the cast tells a story that explores interpersonal relationships and emotions.

The episodes begin and end with a Song of the Week, a pop-style feature song that corresponds with the weekly theme and sets an educational topic for the week's episodes.

== Production ==
Due to the popularity and international appeal of the original Hi-5 series in Australia, it was announced in 2002 that a local American series would be introduced. The U.S. version was filmed in the Australian show's studios from September 2002 to February 2003 and made its debut in February, premiering on TLC and Discovery Kids. The cast consisted of Kimee Balmilero, Curtis Cregan, Jennifer Korbee (née Peterson-Hind), Karla Cheatham Mosley, and Shaun Taylor-Corbett. The series was nominated for a Daytime Emmy in 2005, 2006, and 2007.

The second season first aired on September 26, 2005. The final group of 10 episodes from the second season premiered on September 25, 2006.

In August 2006, Cheateam Mosley and Taylor-Corbett left the cast to pursue other ventures. New touring members Sydney James and Yasmeen Sulieman joined Balmilero, Cregan, and Korbee, but were not featured in the television series. The group last performed together in Puerto Rico in 2008.

== Music ==
The program uses music as an integral part of its concept, and like the original Australian group, the cast of the American series became a recognized musical group for children outside of the show, known collectively as Hi-5. The debut album of the group, Jump and Jive with Hi-5, corresponded with the first season of the show and was released in September 2004 by Koch Entertainment. A special holiday album, It's a Hi-5 Christmas, was released in October 2005. The cast also toured malls and theaters in the U.S., performing songs from the television series. After Mosley and Taylor-Corbett departed, the group continued to tour around the Americas with Sulieman and James throughout 2007 before the group's final performance in Puerto Rico in 2008. Chris Harriott was the primary composer of the show, with the songs written for the Australian group also being used for the American cast.

== Home media ==
On August 1, 2003, it was announced that Southern Star had signed a home media deal with MGM Home Entertainment to release the series on VHS and DVD in the country. MGM would go on to release three volumes on the formats in 2004 under their family-friendly "MGM Kids" banner.

== Cast ==
=== Presenters ===
- Kimee Balmilero – "Puzzles and Patterns"
- Curtis Cregan – "Making Music"
- Jennifer Korbee (née Peterson-Hind) – "Word Play"
- Karla Cheatham Mosley – "Body Move"
- Shaun Taylor-Corbett – "Shapes in Space"

Sydney James and Yasmeen Sulieman joined the group in August 2006, replacing Taylor-Corbett and Cheatham Mosley respectively, but were not featured in the television series.

== Series overview ==
Season	Episodes		Originally released	
Season	Episodes		First released	Last released
1	45	25	February 24, 2003	March 28, 2003
1	45	20	April 19, 2004	May 14, 2004
2	25	15	September 26, 2005	October 14, 2005
2	25	10	September 25, 2006	October 6, 2006

== Episodes ==
=== Season 1 (2003–04) ===
No. overall	No. in season	Title	Song of the Week	Theme	Original release date
Part 1
1	1	"Touching"	Five Senses	Senses	February 24, 2003
Shaun builds a fort and adjusts it to fit all of his friends inside. Karla builds an imaginary fort with the rest of Hi-5 acting as the walls. Jenn discovers a magical pillow that makes a laughing sound when it is squeezed. Kimee pretends to work as a doctor giving her patients medical checkups. Karla describes her feelings after a visit to the doctor. Sharing Stories: Chats tells a story about a circus, where Jenn, Kimee, Shaun, Karla, and Curtis must work out how their special equipment fits in with each of their roles at the circus. Absent: Curtis.
2	2	"Hearing"	Five Senses	Senses	February 25, 2003
Jenn teaches Chats about sign language and helps her learn some signs. Kimee fixes a cupboard door and hears an echo when she taps with her hammer. Karla does some work with an imaginary hammer. Curtis listens to the different stomping sounds that feet make, and how it can sound like they are talking. Karla counts how many different ways there are to walk. Sharing Stories: Shaun tells a story about a rooster (Curtis) with a sore throat, who enlists the other animals on the farm; a horse (Karla), a mouse (Jenn), and a cow (Kimee), to help him perform his morning crow. Absent: Shaun.
3	3	"Seeing"	Five Senses	Senses	February 26, 2003
Shaun becomes a detective and dresses up in a disguise for solving a mystery. Karla uses her face, hands, and feet to show that she is feeling happy. Kimee decorates gloves with eyes to make puppets. Karla plays with finger puppets. Jenn and Chats make shadows using a flashlight when the power goes out. Karla dances with her shadow. Sharing Stories: Curtis tells a story about a mermaid (Jenn) whose friends (Kimee and Shaun) worry that she has poor eyesight, so they take her to an eye doctor (Karla) for a checkup. Absent: Curtis.
4	4	"Smelling"	Five Senses	Senses	February 27, 2003
Shaun explores the noses of different animals. Karla pretends to be a piglet trying to resist the temptation of rolling in the mud. Kimee picks sunflowers from her garden and waters a pot plant with some magic water. Curtis meets some alien creatures from outer space (which happen to be the rest of Hi-5) and translates their languages while making music with them. Karla bobs upwards and downwards. Sharing Stories: Shaun tells a story about a prince (Curtis) who visits two flowers (Karla and Kimee) in an enchanted garden, but fails to notice a shy rosebud (Jenn) until it gains the confidence needed to bloom. Absent: Jenn.
5	5	"Tasting"	Five Senses	Senses	February 28, 2003
Curtis makes musical shakers using rice, macaroni, and other foods. Karla replicates the faces that different animals make when eating food. Jenn teaches Chats the names of different Italian foods when she delivers a pizza. Karla rolls out an imaginary lump of pizza dough. Shaun examines the colour of a watermelon and explores how its shape changes when it is cut into pieces. Karla performs a dance with moves inspired by the fruit salad. Sharing Stories: Karla tells a story about a grumpy kitten (Kimee) who decides to free herself from her owner (Curtis) and make her own breakfast, with the assistance of a dog (Shaun) and pig (Jenn). Absent: Kimee.
6	6	"Jungle Animals"	So Many Animals	Animals	March 3, 2003
Jenn and Chats read about meerkats and how they interact with other animals. Karla prowls around like a lion. Curtis pretends to be a chimpanzee living in the jungle and performs a musical rain dance. Karla pretends to be an elephant stomping through the jungle. Shaun pretends to be a black panther and explores other jungle cats that use the patterns on their bodies to hide. Karla swings across the jungle on the vine of a tree. Sharing Stories: Jenn tells a story about a young frog (Curtis) who tries to learn to jump, while seeking the advice of his father (Shaun), a grasshopper (Kimee), and a kangaroo (Karla). Absent: Kimee.
7	7	"Insects"	So Many Animals	Animals	March 4, 2003
Jenn and Chats build a model ant nest using large cardboard boxes. Karla pretends to be an ant making its way through the tunnels of an underground nest. Shaun weaves a pretend spider web while dressed up as a colorful spider. Kimee dresses up in a bee costume to search for her missing flowers. Karla pretends to fly like different kinds of insects. Sharing Stories: Curtis tells a story about a caterpillar (Kimee) who dreams of being a dancer, and seeks help from her friends (Shaun and Karla) and a shoe seller (Jenn) to find the perfect style of dance. Absent: Curtis.
8	8	"Farm Animals"	So Many Animals	Animals	March 5, 2003
Jenn and Chats prepare a coop to welcome a special chicken visitor. Karla does a funky chicken dance. Shaun becomes a cowboy and pretends to round up a herd of cows. Karla performs a cowgirl style dance. Curtis plays musical cow bells at different pitches and accidentally calls a herd of cows. Karla pretends to milk a cow. Sharing Stories: Karla tells a story about a duck (Jenn) who leaves her pond in the city to visit the farm, where she meets the animals; a duck (Curtis), a sheep (Shaun), and a cow (Kimee), and tries to adjust to the country sounds. Absent: Kimee.
9	9	"Water Animals"	So Many Animals	Animals	March 6, 2003
Shaun explores how emperor penguins move in groups and huddle to keep warm. Karla pretends to be a penguin skating across the ice. Curtis becomes a Puerto Rican singing frog and sings a special song along with his friends. Karla pretends to be a frog jumping around in the rain. Kimee thinks of a unique way to measure the length of a baby whale. Sharing Stories: Kimee tells a story about a young scientist (Karla) who wishes to communicate with fish, and gets the chance to talk to a group of fish (Shaun, Jenn, and Curtis) over the telephone. Absent: Jenn.
10	10	"Animals in the Neighborhood"	So Many Animals	Animals	March 7, 2003
Kimee dresses up as a cat while she prepares a frozen fruit smoothie. Karla pretends to be a newborn kitten curled up on the ground. Curtis' forms a band with three puppies who can sing and play musical instruments. Karla dresses up as a pop music singing parrot. Jenn and Chats go on a moonlit walk through the park in search of nocturnal animals. Karla pretends to be a fruit bat flying in the night. Sharing Stories: Kimee tells a story about two ringtail possums (Curtis and Shaun) who decide to stay awake for the whole day, and journey inside a human's house, where they encounter a child (Karla), before returning home to their mother (Jenn). Absent: Shaun.
11	11	"Machines in the House"	Robot Number One	Machines	March 10, 2003
Kimee works as a telephone operator, answering calls and taking messages. Karla mimes the actions of using different communication methods. Curtis tests out his remote-controlled robots (Jenn, Karla, Shaun, and Kimee), who complete chores around the house in his place. Karla moves like a tumble-dryer by circling clothes around in the air. Jenn uses a bubble making kit to blow bubbles of different shapes and sizes. Karla pretends to be a machine used for making donuts. Sharing Stories: Karla tells a story about a toaster (Curtis) who feels neglected when the children of the house (Shaun and Kimee) start using their new breadmaker (Jenn) in its place. The toaster tries to decorate itself, but the kids think he is a Christmas tree, until the bread maker is broken down. The children now have to use the toaster for their breakfast. Absent: Shaun.
12	12	"Machines in the City"	Robot Number One	Machines	March 11, 2003
Shaun tries to teach his robot dog to walk and move at different speeds. Karla teaches her imaginary robot dog to walk in different directions. Kimee operates the traffic lights for a model of the city and its roads. Karla plays a musical movement game, with stop and go actions. Curtis and Jenn use a computer and microphone to record sounds associated with the busy city lifestyle. Karla pretends to be an airplane. Sharing Stories: Jenn tells a story about a small city crane (Curtis) whose services are rejected by a construction manager (Karla) because of his size, before he proves himself by rescuing an elephant (Kimee) for the ringmaster of a circus (Shaun). Absent: Jenn.
13	13	"Machines in the Country"	Robot Number One	Machines	March 12, 2003
Curtis and the rest of Hi-5 recreate the process of a hay baler at work on a farm. Karla uses her body to represent the movements of a hay baling machine. Shaun examines the engine of his tractor to ensure that it is functioning properly. Karla mimes the movements of different engine parts using her arms and legs. Jenn takes Chats for a ride through the park and to the beach on her bicycle. Sharing Stories: Kimee tells us a story about a lighthouse (Jenn) that gets dizzy because of a seal's jokes (Curtis) and her light points to a wrong spot, so the seal brings the seagull (Karla) to help the lighthouse so she'll be able to help the fisherman (Shaun) not to crash. Absent: Kimee.
14	14	"Machines That Carry People"	Robot Number One	Machines	March 13, 2003
Jenn and Chats imagine travelling underwater in a submarine. Karla pretends to be a submarine moving under the water. Shaun thinks of a way to carry the rest of Hi-5 to the beach when he realizes that his car isn't big enough. Karla pretends to be a train collecting passengers around town. Curtis, Shaun, and Jenn ride an imaginary roller coaster and replicate the sounds of the machine as they ride. Sharing Stories: Shaun tells a story about a girl (Kimee) goes on an adventure with imaginary friend (Curtis) when her mother (Jenn) and dog (Karla) are both too busy to play. Absent: Kimee.
15	15	"Fun Machines"	Robot Number One	Machines	March 14, 2003
Shaun pilots a pretend helicopter to rescue Kimee's toy elephant from a mountain. Karla pretends to be a dance machine and dances along to different music in a variety of ways. Jenn and Chats use a portable fan to fly their kites inside. Karla pretends to be a kite while moving on roller skates. Kimee uses a pretend time machine to travel to different times throughout the day. Karla travels to the future and discovers a new style of fashion. Sharing Stories: Curtis tells a story about two children (Shaun and Jenn) that try to wake up their sister (Kimee), they try everything, like bringing the cat (Karla) and making a new invention. Absent: Curtis.
16	16	"Adventures to Other Countries"	North, South, East, and West	Adventure	March 17, 2003
Jenn teaches Chats how to say the Spanish word: "sombrero". Karla pretends to be a fancy Spanish dancing horse. Shaun goes on a pretend adventure to Mexico and climbs a pyramid called the Temple of the Sun. Karla climbs up an imaginary mountain. Curtis receives postcards which transport him and the rest of Hi-5 to Africa and Brazil, where they listen to different music from both places. Sharing Stories: Curtis tells a story about three friends (Shaun, Jenn, and Kimee) who dress up in traditional clothes from Hawaii, Holland, and Russia, before traveling to a pretend land and meeting someone (Karla) who combines all three traditional garments. Absent: Kimee.
17	17	"Adventures Around Your House"	North, South, East, and West	Adventure	March 18, 2003
Curtis imagines being as small as an ant (Kimee) and as tall as an elephant (Shaun), examining the different dynamics of his voice at each size. Karla pretends to be small starting to grow. Kimee devises a plan to find her missing watch. Karla has got chatty shoes. Shaun builds a cave using a table and adventures inside to meet a fierce dragon (Curtis). Karla does a dance inspired by a dragon. Sharing Stories: Shaun tells a story about a girl (Jenn) who tries to film her family (Kimee, Karla, and Curtis) for a school project, but struggles to contain their silly antics in the process. Absent: Jenn.
18	18	"Adventures Around Your Town"	North, South, East, and West	Adventure	March 19, 2003
Shaun becomes a postman and delivers packages to the rest of Hi-5 on his bicycle. Karla rides around town on an imaginary bicycle. Kimee pretends to be a police officer reporting for traffic duty around town. Jenn and Chats explore how firefighters carry out their duties during emergencies. Karla pretends to be drivers of different city vehicles answering emergency calls. Sharing Stories: Karla tells a story about a pirate called Captain Puffy Pants (Curtis), whose pants cause a commotion when he competes against his nemesis Captain High Note (Kimee) in a race, along with his crew (Shaun and Jenn). Absent: Curtis.
19	19	"Adventures to the Universe"	North, South, East, and West	Adventure	March 20, 2003
Jenn and Chats try to find shapes in the stars while looking through a telescope. Karla moves around on the imaginary Planet Move-a-Lot. Kimee pretends to be a space cadet and inspects her gear before exploring the universe. Karla pretends to glide in space. Curtis plays a harp as he pretends to be the keeper of the stars in the night sky. Sharing Stories: Kimee tells a story about two children (Jenn and Shaun) who invent a spaceship with recycled materials and travel to space, where they meet two space explorers (Curtis and Karla) and invite them back to Earth. Absent: Shaun.
20	20	"Underground"	North, South, East, and West	Adventure	March 21, 2003
Shaun crawls through a tunnel which leads to a rabbit warren. Karla hops and jumps like different animals. Jenn and Chats interpret ancient Egyptian hieroglyphics inscribed on a rock. Karla does an Egyptian dance while dressed as a princess. Kimee journeys underground through a hidden ancient tunnel in search of a diamond. Karla makes a diamond shape with her fingers. Sharing Stories: Kimee tells a story about a boy (Shaun) who goes on a digging expedition, where he encounters an earthworm (Karla), an antique Spanish coin (Curtis), and an ancient dinosaur bone (Jenn) underground. Absent: Curtis.
21	21	"Outside"	Ready or Not	Games	March 24, 2003
Jenn practices her surfing technique on the land before going out to sea. Karla throws an imaginary beach ball in the air. Kimee presents the television weather report and chooses clothes for the different conditions. Karla pretends to be the sun rising in the morning. Shaun and Curtis complete an obstacle course involving shapes, for an imaginary championship. Karla pretends to be a bowling pin. Sharing Stories: Jenn tells a story about a boy (Curtis) who is granted magic running shoes from a genie (Karla), which allow him to keep up with his friends (Shaun and Kimee). Absent: Curtis.
22	22	"Rainy Days"	Ready or Not	Games	March 25, 2003
Shaun stages a powerful storm performance with the rest of Hi-5 acting as clouds, rain, and thunder. Karla pretends to be a lightning bolt and uses her body to create powerful movements. Curtis and the rest of Hi-5 change a song by singing it in different ways. Karla pretends to be a fish dancing the fishy wobble. Jenn and Chats play a game using sounds that can be heard on a rainy day. Karla jumps and leaps over the puddles. Sharing Stories: Shaun tells a story about a fairy (Jenn) living inside a sunflower, who adventures around the garden of a young girl (Kimee), and a helicopter (Curtis) before returning to her sunflower patch. Absent: Kimee.
23	23	"Fantasy Games"	Ready or Not	Games	March 26, 2003
Jenn and Chats build a snowman in the cold weather outside. Karla uses tap shoes to make the sound of rain. Curtis chooses instruments to accompany his life-sized musical merry-go-round. Karla pretends to be different horses. Kimee becomes a puppeteer and puts on a sock puppet show. Karla pretends to be a marionette puppet on a string, performing different actions. Sharing Stories: Jenn tells a story about a girl (Kimee) who visits a library and finds a joke book where Curtis the joke teller lives, a nursery rhymes book where Karla a little bo peep lives, and an ancient history book where Shaun from Ancient Rome lives. Absent: Shaun.
24	24	"Physical Games"	Ready or Not	Games	March 27, 2003
Shaun prepares a song and dance for the opening ceremony of a Hi-5 multi-sport event. Karla tries to keep a balloon in the air. Curtis plays a steel drum and finds other sounds that might be heard at a soccer game. Karla plays an imaginary game of football and practises her kicking skills. Kimee searches her cupboards to solve a puzzle that Jenn has left for her. Karla throws and catches a beach ball. Sharing Stories: Curtis tells a story about a girl (Jenn) who dreams that the posters of her favorite sporting stars (Karla, Shaun, and Kimee) come to life, giving her the opportunity to play their sports with them. Absent: Jenn.
25	25	"Silly Day"	Ready or Not	Games	March 28, 2003
Curtis discovers the mixed-up body parts of different made-up animals. Karla pretends to run a race against herself. Kimee practices dancing the waltz while Jup Jup meddles with the tempo of her music. Karla dances with her mop while cleaning the floor. Jenn asks Chats to guess which form of transportation she is acting out. Karla tries to decide on a method of transportation to use to travel to meet a friend. Sharing Stories: Karla tells a story about a boy (Shaun) who is thrown a surprise party by his friends (Jenn, Kimee, and Curtis), which leads him to wish for a birthday lasting every day. Absent: Shaun.
Part 2
26	26	"Faces"	Move Your Body	Bodies	April 19, 2004
Jenn follows Chats's instructions to cure her hiccups, with deep breathing exercises. Karla attempts to draw while hiccupping, sneezing, and coughing. Curtis, Kimee, and Shaun make musical sounds to replicate the noises their bodies make while eating. Karla pretends to eat an imaginary bowl of spaghetti. Kimee brushes her teeth before visiting the dentist. Karla smiles to show that she is feeling happy after brushing her teeth. Sharing Stories: Curtis tells a story about a butterfly (Jenn) who forgets to collect food for a summer feast in the garden, and seeks help from her friends; a bee (Kimee), a fruit bat (Shaun), and a possum (Karla). Absent: Shaun.
27	27	"Arms and Legs"	Move Your Body	Bodies	April 20, 2004
Curtis holds a meeting for the "hug club", where he and the rest of Hi-5 share new ideas for ways to hug someone. Shaun dreams of competing to become the strongest weightlifter in the world. Karla exercises her arms by lifting weights. Kimee exercises with a jump rope and stays hydrated by drinking water. Karla heads over to the other side of her space taking different kinds of steps. Sharing Stories: Jenn tells a story about a boy (Shaun) who spends his birthday in the hospital because of a broken leg, and is visited by his mother (Karla), neighbor (Kimee), and his favorite sports star (Curtis). Absent: Jenn.
28	28	"Movement"	Move Your Body	Bodies	April 21, 2004
Jenn leads Chats in a workout at the park to help her feel re-energized. Karla exercises the muscles in her face by moving her mouth and eyes. Kimee measures herself on a height chart and tries to become the tallest member of Hi-5. Karla walks on stilts across the hot ground. Curtis puts his instruments aside and thinks of creative ways to make music with his body. Karla plays imaginary instruments by miming the actions. Sharing Stories: Shaun tells a story about a cricket (Curtis) who feels sad when he discovers he can't make a chirping sound, and asks his insect friends; a bee (Kimee) and butterfly (Jenn), to help him learn how to chirp. Absent: Shaun.
29	29	"Inside and Outside"	Move Your Body	Bodies	April 22, 2004
Shaun dresses up as a skeleton and explores the bones that make up his body. Karla moves her body like a press-and-release toy. Kimee makes a sculpture of a face using her cupboards, which Jup Jup leads her to believe that eating food is like a real body. Karla tries to pat her head and rub her stomach at the same time. Jenn asks Chats to help her fall asleep when she feels too energetic for bed. Karla stretches and yawns to wake herself up for the morning. Sharing Stories: Karla tells us a story about a dragon (Curtis) who loves knitting, but his brother and sisters (Shaun, Kimee, and Jenn) laugh at him because he doesn't like roaring, stomping, and fire breathing. Absent: Curtis.
30	30	"Games and Sports"	Move Your Body	Bodies	April 23, 2004
Curtis rehearses with the Hi-5 marching band as they practice their movements. Karla marches lifting knees and swinging arms. Jenn practices a taekwondo pattern and shows Chats her progress. Karla uses her body to say thank you in different ways. Shaun exercises with different ball sports, and tries to determine which is his favorite. Karla practices her sport skills with an imaginary ball. Sharing Stories: Kimee tells a story about a boy (Shaun) who prefers to dance rather than play sport like his athletic friends and family (Karla, Curtis, and Jenn), but decides to keep his hobby a secret. Absent: Kimee.
31	31	"Imaginary Friends"	Three Wishes	Wishes	April 26, 2004
Kimee tries to discover the imaginary creature that might be making noises in her cupboard wall. Karla plays and dances with her imaginary fairy friend. Shaun turns a beanbag into a pet and experiments with changing its shape. Jenn tells Chats about a dream she had, in which she was chased by a rabbit. Karla decides to introduce her elbows and knees to each other. Curtis writes a silly song for his dog, which the rest of Hi-5 mistakenly believe he has written about them. Absent: Sharing Stories.
32	32	"When I Grow Up"	Three Wishes	Wishes	April 27, 2004
Curtis and the rest of Hi-5 share the careers they dreamed of pursuing as they were growing up. Karla pretends to be a hairdresser and practices on Jenn and Curtis. Shaun plays with a model steam train and builds a track for it to travel along. Kimee arranges some bouquets of colorful flowers for the rest of Hi-5. Sharing Stories: Jenn tells a story about three friends (Kimee, Shaun, and Curtis) who use dress-up to show what they'd like to do when they grow up. Absent: Jenn.
33	33	"Imaginary Places"	Three Wishes	Wishes	April 28, 2004
Curtis plays a Celtic harp, which transports him to a magical land with dancing leprechauns. Karla pretends to be a baby and explores how they move. Shaun interprets ancient symbols while searching for a hidden pyramid in Egypt. Karla sits like a lotus flower, followed by a cobra. Kimee wonders what it would be like to be an animal, so dresses up as a silly imaginary creature to find out. Karla imagines visiting a place where she can dance all the time. Sharing Stories: Curtis tells a story about a unicorn (Karla) who struggles to find her place, when she feels like the other forest creatures; a gnome (Shaun) and two fairies (Jenn and Kimee), don't appreciate her talents. Absent: Jenn.
34	34	"Daydreams"	Three Wishes	Wishes	April 29, 2004
Jenn and Chats daydream of visiting the beach on a hot day, and imagine journeying under the water. Karla pretends to collect sea shells at the beach. Curtis dresses up as a bird of fire and pretends to fly at different speeds and heights in the sky. Shaun uses a mind-reading machine to discover what Kimee has been dreaming about. Karla pretends to row a sailboat around a tropical island. Sharing Stories: Shaun tells a story about three dress-up dolls (Kimee, Jenn, and Karla) from Polynesia, Japan, and Australia, who tell each other about their countries when they are joined by a new Scottish doll (Curtis). Absent: Kimee.
35	35	"What If?"	Three Wishes	Wishes	April 30, 2004
Kimee wonders what she could use to cut paper if scissors hadn't been invented. Karla makes scissor movements with different parts of her body. Jenn and Chats decide it isn't a coincidence that they are both wearing the same hat, but that it is because they are such good friends. Karla uses her movements to show her happy and energetic mood. Shaun becomes a racing car driver and designs his own winding track to race on. Karla dances with a ribbon. Sharing Stories: Kimee tells a story about a girl (Karla) who decides to collect memorabilia from the beach while on vacation, with the help of the island animals (Curtis and Shaun) and her grandmother (Jenn). Absent: Curtis.
36	36	"Instruments"	Feel the Beat	Music	May 3, 2004
Kimee crafts her own set of musical wind chimes using metal kitchen utensils. Karla plays a giant piano. Curtis, Shaun, and Jenn explore the family of string instruments; the violin, cello, and double bass. Karla dances to the fiddle, cello, and double bass beat. Shaun wants to be a king and makes everything he needs out of shapes. Sharing Stories: Shaun tells us a story about three animal friends (Jenn the cat, Kimee the rat, and Curtis the dog) that make junk instruments, until a ferret (Karla) hears their music and she wants to join them but she doesn't have any instrument. Absent: Jenn.
37	37	"Styles of Music"	Feel the Beat	Music	May 4, 2004
Shaun dances to Latin American music while playing a game of limbo. Karla dances under an imaginary limbo stick. Jenn creates a life-size music box and sings different styles of music each time Chats opens it. Karla and Kimee practice a traditional German leg-slapping dance. Curtis meets a talking piano and uses jazz music to help it find its groove again. Karla pretends to be a dancing ballerina from the inside of a music box. Sharing Stories: Karla tells a story about a group of friends (Shaun, Kimee, Jenn, and Curtis) who form a band together, but can't decide on a style of music to play. Absent: Kimee.
38	38	"Music from Around the World"	Feel the Beat	Music	May 5, 2004
Jenn shows Chats a steel drum from Jamaica and uses it to play reggae music. Karla pretends to play a percussive drum beat with different parts of her body. Kimee wears ankle bells and finger cymbals to dance to Indian music. Karla pretends to be a clapper inside a bell. Curtis plays a tiktiri from India to summon a snake from inside a basket. Karla pretends to be a snake in the desert. Sharing Stories: Curtis tells a story about a girl (Jenn) who experiments with the on-off switch of her music box, as she watches its two dancing dolls (Karla and Shaun) perform. Absent: Shaun.
39	39	"Music and Movement"	Feel the Beat	Music	May 6, 2004
Curtis counts along to the different meters of waltz music and blues rock. Shaun finds a music machine with a heart shape, tap shoes, and an electric guitar. Karla tries to lead an orchestra, but the orchestra seems to lead her. Kimee puts on warm black and white clothes for a trip to Antarctica, which leave her looking like a penguin. Karla skates across a frozen lake while looking for penguins on the ice. Sharing Stories: Kimee tells a story about a boy (Shaun) who is invited to sing for his brother's band (Curtis, Jenn, and Karla), but finds out that he can only sing at his best while he is in the bathtub. Absent: Jenn.
40	40	"Silly Music"	Feel the Beat	Music	May 7, 2004
Curtis, Shaun, Kimee, and Jenn make up actions to match the silly words of a song. Jenn challenges Chats to guess the names of the instruments she is playing by listening to their sounds. Karla and the rest of Hi-5 pretend to be a fizzing drink. Shaun builds silly musical instruments from household items to play in a wild music band with Curtis and Jenn. Karla plays imaginary instruments for a musical performance. Sharing Stories: Jenn tells a story about four friends (Karla, Shaun, Curtis, and Kimee) who invent a silly dancing game to keep themselves occupied on a rainy day. Absent: Kimee.
41	41	"Favorites and Feelings"	Living in a Rainbow	Colors	May 10, 2004
Jenn brings Chats a colorful present when she is feeling grumpy and blue. Karla gives hugs and kisses as a way of saying hello and goodbye. Curtis talks about how noisy his family can be, and asks the rest of Hi-5 to pretend to be his relatives. Shaun paints a cardboard cut-out of himself, choosing colors to represent the feelings associated with each body part. Karla performs different movements to show the way she feels. Sharing Stories: Curtis tells a story about two blossoming daffodils (Shaun and Karla) who meet a new red flower bulb (Kimee), and a child (Jenn) who stops to appreciate them all. Absent: Kimee.
42	42	"Animals"	Living in a Rainbow	Colors	May 11, 2004
Curtis, Shaun, and Jenn make the sound of a lion's roar using cylinder tubes. Karla pretends to be a peacock shaking her feather to find a friend. Kimee uses boxes to build a machine that will transport her toys from one place to another. Karla pretends to be a horse from the merry-go-round. Sharing Stories: Curtis tells us a story about a tiger (Jenn) that can't see any color, but Kimee the monkey, Shaun the giraffe, and Karla the lion invite her to a party near some colored plants. Absent: Jenn.
43	43	"Nature"	Living in a Rainbow	Colors	May 12, 2004
Kimee paints a colorful picture of a park by mixing colors. Karla paints an imaginary picture while dancing. Shaun explores a pretend Congo jungle and rows down the river. Karla pretends to be a parrot. Jenn and Chats pretend to be the seasons of fall and spring, while finding the differences between the two. Karla plays with autumn leaves. Sharing Stories: Jenn tells a story about four friends (Curtis, Kimee, Karla, and Shaun) who play in puddles of rain while wearing colorful rainboots. Absent: Curtis.
44	44	"Imagination"	Living in a Rainbow	Colors	May 13, 2004
Kimee tries to find a costume for a belly dancing song. Karla dances while wearing her fancy pants. Curtis pretends to journey to space in a silver spaceship while making silver star music. Karla pretends to be from outer space arriving on the moon. Shaun the artist paints a rainbow masterpiece. Karla draws a funny friendly face. Sharing Stories: Jenn tells a story about a grumpy troll (Curtis) who lives under a bridge, and tries to stop the three sheep (Kimee, Karla, and Shaun) from crossing, so he can sleep. Absent: Jenn.
45	45	"Playing"	Living in a Rainbow	Colors	May 14, 2004
Jenn and Chats use a stethoscope to listen to their heartbeats. Karla draws heart shapes in the air. Curtis dresses up as a king for a matching game involving musical instruments with his royal subjects. Kimee blows up balloons and explores how they inflate and deflate. Karla tries to balance a beach ball on her nose like a seal. Sharing Stories: Jenn tells a story about a boy (Shaun) who feels shy when meeting his new neighbor (Curtis), before their mothers (Karla and Kimee) encourage the children to play with each other to ease their nerves. Absent: Shaun.

=== Season 2 (2005–06) ===
No. overall	No. in season	Title	Song of the Week	Theme	Original release date
Part 1
46	1	"Making in Nature"	Making Music	Making	September 26, 2005
Jenn helps Chats decorate her fish tank. Karla pretends to be a fish exploring a fish tank. Curtis watches his new musical flowers bloom; a pop music flower (Kimee), a blues flower (Shaun), and a marching music flower (Jenn). Shaun dresses up like a venus flytrap plant and waits for an insect lunch. Karla tries to catch balls while standing still like a venus flytrap. Sharing Stories: Shaun tells a story about a tadpole (Jenn) who decides to visit her frog grandparents (Karla and Curtis) with her friend (Kimee), before they both change into frogs along the way. Absent: Kimee.
47	2	"Making a Work of Art"	Making Music	Making	September 27, 2005
Curtis paints while listening to different pieces of music, which each help him to paint in different ways. Karla paints using her handprints. Kimee dances while wearing different kinds of hats. Karla puts on different hats used for sport. Shaun dresses up as a magical creature which he has created in his imagination. Karla draws a circle and turns it into different things. Sharing Stories: Kimee tells a story about three tubes of paint (Shaun, Jenn, and Curtis), who each hope that their painter (Karla) will choose their color. Absent: Jenn.
48	3	"Making a Space for Me"	Making Music	Making	September 28, 2005
Kimee goes for a ride in a hot air balloon. Jenn is feeling blue, so Chats helps her think of other colors to make her happy. Karla sings "Feelings". Professor Curtis tests out a new machine which plays music for different moods. Karla's tries to control her busy fingers. Sharing Stories: Karla tells a story about two sisters (Kimee and Jenn) who turn a box into a fairy racer, before their brothers (Curtis and Shaun) decide to use it as a wizard mobile. Absent: Shaun.
49	4	"Making a Surprise"	Making Music	Making	September 29, 2005
Kimee makes a surprise breakfast for her mother. Karla makes an egg shape with her body and rolls around. Jenn tries to cure Chats's hiccups with a tongue twister. Karla tries to find a way to give Curtis a surprise. Shaun cooks a pasta surprise: spaghetti. Sharing Stories: Curtis tells a story about three buildings (Karla, Shaun, and Jenn) who watch as a builder (Kimee) arrives to construct something new in the center of their area. Absent: Curtis.
50	5	"Things That Animals Create"	Making Music	Making	September 30, 2005
Shaun and Curtis pretend to be weaver ants building a nest for their family. Karla makes a queen ant using play dough. Jenn and Chats go on a quest for different nests in the African jungle. Karla moves like a monkey. Curtis imagines meeting a spider on a web (Kimee), while it weaves its web and sings. Sharing Stories: Jenn tells a story about a swarm of worker bees (Curtis, Kimee, and Shaun), who set off to find some new food for their queen (Karla) to eat when she announces she'd like a change from honey. Absent: Kimee.
51	6	"Games and Sports"	Action Hero	Action	October 3, 2005
Shaun hosts a game show called What's That Action?, in which contestants Jenn and Karla must guess and perform physical movements. Kimee jumps over puddles that the rain has left in the garden. Curtis and Shaun play a call and response singing game. Karla and the rest of Hi-5 play a copycat action game. Sharing Stories: Jenn tells a story about four friends (Curtis, Shaun, Karla, and Kimee) who form a toboggan team and try to find the best positions needed to steer the sled. Absent: Jenn.
52	7	"Jobs"	Action Hero	Action	October 4, 2005
Jenn imagines climbing up a mountain to rescue Chats after going indoor rock climbing. Kimee plants a passion fruit vine on a lattice outside, which Jup Jup waters with magic water. Shaun builds a harbor and pretends to be a lighthouse, guiding ships to the land. Karla goes for a walk before watching the sunrise. Sharing Stories: Shaun tells a story about a zebra (Curtis) who leaves the zoo and hides from the zookeepers (Jenn and Karla) by camouflaging against black and white buildings, before being brought back to the zoo by a child (Kimee). Absent: Curtis.
53	8	"Machines and Other Things That Move"	Action Hero	Action	October 5, 2005
Kimee uses a pulley to lift up bricks in order to build a house for her teddy. Curtis invents a machine that doubles his voice, so he can sing a duet with himself. Karla and Kimee pretend to be twins while wearing the same outfit. Jenn becomes a repair person and tries to figure out what sound is coming from inside Chats's broken clothes dryer. Karla turns her arm into a vacuum cleaner and uses it to clean Kimee's space. Sharing Stories: Curtis tells a story about three heavy lifting machines (Jenn, Shaun, and Karla), who work together to rescue a duck (Kimee) that is stuck in a pond. Absent: Shaun.
54	9	"Action Heroes"	Action Hero	Action	October 6, 2005
Curtis plays heroic theme music for a superhero named Hyper Guy (Shaun) while following him around. Kimee dresses up as a superhero, while Jup Jup helps her transform into a beetle. Karla practices her superhero moves. Shaun pretends to be an active superhero who can move at different speeds. Karla moves like a superhero. Sharing Stories: Karla tells a story about a boy (Curtis) who helps a group of superheroes (Jenn, Shaun, and Kimee) fix their problems, and discovers his own super power in the process. Absent: Jenn.
55	10	"Health and Fitness"	Action Hero	Action	October 7, 2005
Shaun creates a healthy new recipe using his favorite foods. Curtis starts a new fitness regime with a disco dancing workout. Karla does a disco dancing workout. Jenn tries to keep in time with her jump rope by following along to Chats's jumping song. Karla plays a game involving jumping, hopping, and leaping. Sharing Stories: Kimee tells a story about a squirrel (Curtis) who forgets to collect nuts for the winter like his friends (Karla, Jenn, and Shaun), when he is preoccupied with singing songs. Absent: Kimee.
56	11	"Sports"	T.E.A.M.	Teams	October 10, 2005
Jenn and Chats try to find the right hog call they need to attract a pig. Kimee decides to try out for the tennis team, but must change her sport when Jup Jup replaces the ball. Karla plays totem tennis. Shaun and Curtis practice playing silly party games; an egg-and-spoon race, and a three-legged race. Karla practices a cheer for her team. Sharing Stories: Shaun tells a story about a troupe of dancing ducks (Jenn, Karla, and Kimee) who must put their predispositions about the group aside when a dazzling cat (Curtis) auditions to join and brings a new style of moves along with him. Absent: Curtis.
57	12	"When Am I a Team Player?"	T.E.A.M.	Teams	October 11, 2005
Shaun and the Hi-5 synchronized swimming team practice a routine. Karla and the Hi-5 swimming team compete in a medley relay. Curtis pretends to be a penguin conducting an orchestra composed of his hungry friends. Karla encourages her feet to work together so that she can tap dance. Kimee prepares healthy snacks in lunchboxes for Hi-5 to eat. Sharing Stories: Jenn tells a story about a girl (Kimee) who, in the excitement of receiving new dancing dolls (Karla and Curtis) for her birthday, accidentally loses her favorite toy monkey (Shaun), leaving the dolls to work together to find him. Absent: Jenn.
58	13	"Animals"	T.E.A.M.	Teams	October 12, 2005
Shaun becomes the captain of a marching band and helps his team practice walking in time together. Karla pretends to be a crab, snapping with her claws. Curtis pretends to be an African oxpecker bird who befriends a hippo (Shaun). Karla pretends to be a hippopotamus. Jenn and Chats pretend to be beavers working together to build a dam in the forest. Sharing Stories: Kimee tells a story about three teddy bears (Shaun, Karla, and Curtis) who go on an imaginary indoor pirate adventure in search of a special treasure, which they find with their mother (Jenn). Absent: Kimee.
59	14	"Cooperation and Communities"	T.E.A.M.	Teams	October 13, 2005
Curtis writes a song for the Hi-5 hopping team to help them keep in time with each other. Shaun finds a way to use cylinder shapes to roll a large building block across the floor. Karla winds down to some calm and relaxing music. When Jenn loses her voice, Chats tries to work out what she is trying to say through charades. Karla gives her tired feet a foot massage after a long walk. Sharing Stories: Curtis tells a story about a whale (Shaun) who is beached on a sandbank while water skiing with a mermaid (Karla), and is rescued with the help of a tugboat (Jenn) and lighthouse (Kimee). Absent: Kimee.
60	15	"Teams"	T.E.A.M.	Teams	October 14, 2005
Curtis meets a group of aliens who mistake him for a music manager from Mars. Karla dances the Charleston as an audition piece. Jenn shows Chats a marionette puppet, and then pretends to move like a puppet on strings herself. Karla looks through a photo album and remembers what it was like to be a baby. Kimee tries to decide on a circus trick to perform while Jup Jup gives her some ideas. Sharing Stories: Karla tells a story about a lonely king (Curtis) who summons a tricky magic jester (Shaun) to help him find something exciting to do: a request which culminates in him forming a band with two other royals (Jenn and Kimee). Absent: Shaun.
Part 2
61	16	"Wonderful World"	Some Kind of Wonderful	Wonderful	September 25, 2006
Kimee paints a picture of the blue ocean on a summer day, before the weather starts to change. Karla pretends to be waves rolling onto the shore. Jenn shows Chats a kaleidoscope and then she dresses up with colorful clothes around her waist. Curtis imagines the sounds he would hear under the sea. Karla pretends to be an octopus. Sharing Stories: Jenn tells a story about a girl (Karla) who gets a pair of jet powered rocket boots to visit her friends around the world; in the snow (Curtis), and the jungle (Kimee and Shaun). Absent: Shaun.
62	17	"Wonderful People"	Some Kind of Wonderful	Wonderful	September 26, 2006
Shaun becomes a tugboat. Karla and Kimee have a tugging competition. Kimee drives a bus and takes her animal friends to the park for a picnic but Jup Jup takes away the steering wheel. Karla follows some tricky instructions to get to the other side of her space. Jenn does voice exercises and Chats tries to follow her though she always sings out of time. Sharing Stories: Kimee tells a story about a boy (Curtis) who wants to be a firefighter, and spends a day at the station with a real team (Shaun, Karla, and Jenn), helping them during a real emergency. Absent: Curtis.
63	18	"Wonderful Places"	Some Kind of Wonderful	Wonderful	September 27, 2006
Kimee looks for a wonderful place in the world to visit. Karla feels like a sheep because she wears woolen clothes. Curtis watches at his snow globes and imagines being at the North Pole. Karla pretends to be a snowflake and a raindrop. Shaun becomes a warrior who must find a way to travel to the Egyptian pyramids when his horse abandons the chariot. Sharing Stories: Curtis tells a story about 3 sandpit toys (Karla, Shaun, and Kimee) who meet a groundhog (Jenn) with a small burrow, and decide to build her a new place to live. Absent: Jenn.
64	19	"Wonderful Days"	Some Kind of Wonderful	Wonderful	September 28, 2006
Shaun and the Hi-5 band get ready for the wonders of the world parade. Karla leans like the Leaning Tower of Pisa. Jenn and Chats invent Night-Day, the day where they can pretend it's night. Kimee visits the museum, and Jup Jup comes along inside her backpack. Karla pretends to be a tyrannosaurus rex stomping through the forest. Sharing Stories: Karla tells a story about four pets (Jenn, Kimee, Curtis, and Shaun), who all argue about which animal of the group their special day should be dedicated to. Absent: Curtis.
65	20	"Wonderful Gifts and Treasures"	Some Kind of Wonderful	Wonderful	September 29, 2006
Jenn is sad because her favorite music box is broken, so Chats finds a way to cheer her up. Shaun finds a treasure chest with a pirate costume inside. Karla climbs up a rigging but she stops to do some push ups. Curtis uses dishes in the kitchen sink to make music while cleaning. Karla makes a kitchen sink dance. Sharing Stories: Shaun tells a story about the teddy bear (Kimee) of a young girl (Karla), who fears she is not as shiny and new as the other toys (Jenn and Curtis). Absent: Kimee.
66	21	"Animals"	Underwater Discovery	Journeys	October 2, 2006
Shaun the snow goose teaches his class of young geese how to fly together in formation. Karla practices her snow goose flying and landing. Jenn pretends to be a homing pigeon, to deliver a message for Chats and return home afterwards. Curtis pretends to be a bee who performs a special dance to assist his swarm on their search for flowers. Karla dresses up as a bee for a dance featuring bee movements. Sharing Stories: Shaun tells a story about a swallow (Karla) who decides to teach her babies (Curtis and Jenn) how to fly, including the youngest bird (Kimee), who is worried about leaving the nest. Absent: Kimee.
67	22	"People"	Underwater Discovery	Journeys	October 3, 2006
Kimee cooks some quesadillas from Mexico before she decides to change her recipe. Karla and Jenn do a Mexican dance. Curtis remembers how he would make up driving songs when he was younger, to pass the time during long car trips with his family. Karla has a break during a long driving trip, to stretch her body. Shaun rides a camel across the desert, to transport water from the well back to camp. Sharing Stories: Kimee tells a story about three white clouds (Jenn, Curtis, and Karla) who meet a storm cloud (Shaun), who teaches the friends how to create storms like him. Absent: Jenn.
68	23	"Places"	Underwater Discovery	Journeys	October 4, 2006
Kimee goes for a walking trip around Paris, to see the Eiffel Tower and the Arc de Triomphe. Karla sings in French. Jenn and Chats go on an imaginary journey in search of a legendary bunyip. Curtis becomes a DJ and tries to find the best tempo for his music at a dance party. Karla pretends to play a giant xylophone by jumping on the keys. Sharing Stories: Jenn tells a story about an octopus (Shaun) living in the ocean, who journeys to the edge of the coral reef for a picnic lunch, while meeting some friends along the way (Curtis, Karla, and Kimee). Absent: Shaun.
69	24	"Journeys Through Life"	Underwater Discovery	Journeys	October 5, 2006
Jenn helps Chats decide on a job she'd like to have when she's older. Curtis learns how to play the jaw harp from a silly teacher (Shaun) who teaches him how to relax and wobble. Karla tries to find the difference between jiggling and wobbling. Kimee crafts a caterpillar as a gift, which can turn into a butterfly. Karla pretends to be a colorful butterfly. Sharing Stories: Curtis tells a story about a boot-scooting dancing group (Karla, Kimee, and Shaun) who welcome a new member (Jenn), and try to help her fit in with their routine. Absent: Shaun.
70	25	"Journeys Through Your Imagination"	Underwater Discovery	Journeys	October 6, 2006
Shaun turns his white bed sheets into snowy mountains as he goes on a climbing adventure. Karla pretends to be a shirt hanging on the clothes line. Kimee uses her imagination to transform two chairs into equipment for an adventure holiday. Jenn and Chats imagine visiting the fun park and riding on a roller coaster and carousel. Karla and Curtis dress up as clowns. Sharing Stories: Karla tells a story about two children (Kimee and Curtis) who have an imaginary trip at home with their mother (Jenn), when they miss school due to being sick. Absent: Curtis.

== Awards and nominations ==
The series was nominated for three Daytime Emmy Award for Outstanding Pre-School Children's Series awards in 2005, 2006, and 2007, but lost all 3 to Sesame Street.
