= Curtis Cregan =

American actor

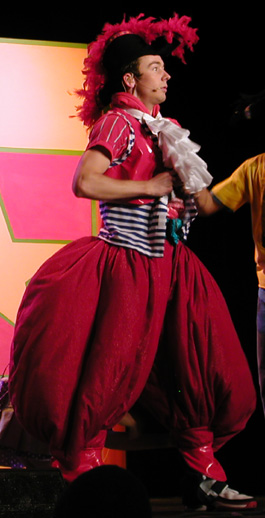
- Curtis Cregan as Captain Puffypants in Hi-5's Move Your Body Tour.
- Born: Curtis John Cregan; January 18, 1977 (age 49); Lititz, Pennsylvania, U.S.
- Occupations: Salesman; actor; singer; dancer
- Years active: 1996–2008 (actor); 2009–present (salesman)
- Spouse: Jenn Gambatese (m. 2007-present)
- Children: 2

Curtis John Cregan (CREE-gan; born January 18, 1977) is an American salesman and former actor, singer, and dancer, best known as a member of the American version of the Australian children's television show Hi-5 from 2003 to 2006.

== Early life ==
Cregan was born in Lititz, Pennsylvania and raised in Okemos, Michigan, where he attended Okemos High School. He studied with choral director Frank K. DeWald. He attended the University of Cincinnati College-Conservatory of Music.

== Career ==
Cregan's first performing job was as an emcee for the Nickelodeon show at Kings Island. After college, he made his Broadway debut in Rent. From there, he went on to play such roles as Doody from Grease, Dickon from The Secret Garden and one of the Von Trapp Family from The Sound of Music.

In 2003, Cregan joined the American version of the Australian children's television show Hi-5. His role is similar to that of Tim Harding, Tim Maddren and Joe Kalou's in the original Australian version. In the series, Cregan's segment is "Making Music", where he explains the fundamentals of music and making musical instruments from everyday objects. Cregan also provided the voice of Kimee Balmilero's mischief-making friend Jup-Jup.

== Personal life ==
Curtis married Broadway actress Jenn Gambatese on June 30, 2007. They have two daughters.

Since 2009, Cregan has been a salesman for various companies.
