= Zack Conroy =

American actor

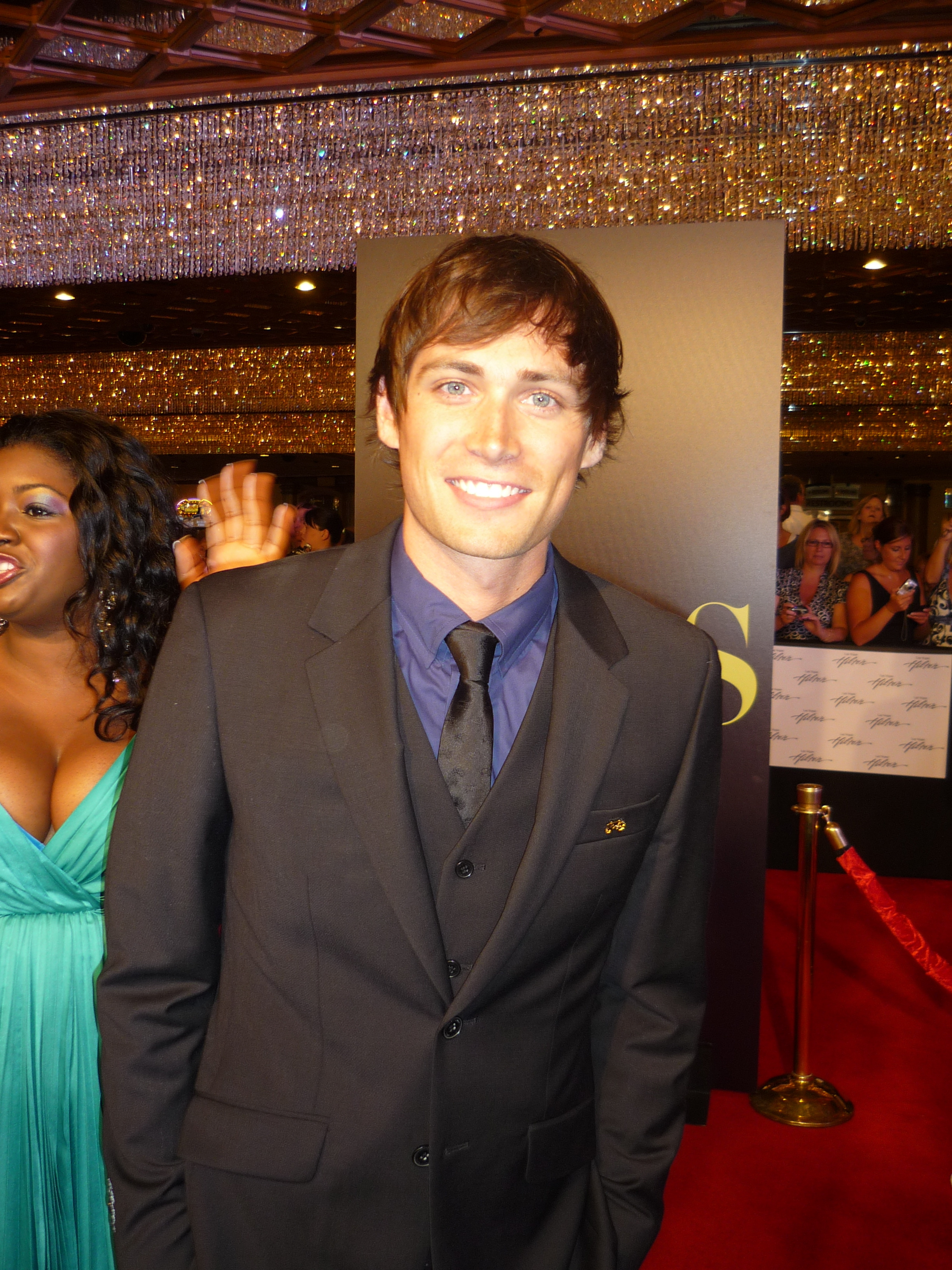
- Conroy at the 2010 Daytime Emmy Awards
- Born: April 19, 1985 (age 41); Portsmouth, New Hampshire, United States

Zack Conroy (born April 19, 1985, in Portsmouth, New Hampshire) is an American actor and finance executive.

== Career ==
=== Acting ===
Conroy portrayed James Spaulding on Guiding Light from April 2009 until the show's finale in September of that year. In 2010, Conroy received a nomination for Outstanding Younger Actor for his portrayal of James at the 37th Daytime Emmy Awards.

In December 2009, Conroy was cast on The Bold and the Beautiful as Oliver Jones. His first air date was on January 20, 2010. On April 5, 2013, it was announced that Conroy would cross over to B&B's sister-soap The Young and the Restless in his role as Oliver, starting on May 21. His final appearance was in 2015.

=== Finance ===
Conroy graduated from Boston College with a bachelor's degree in finance and management. In June 2015, he earned a master's degree in business administration from UCLA.

Over the last several years, Conroy has served as a financial advisor to several entertainment-related companies. In 2020, he was appointed senior vice president of finance and operations at 2.0 Entertainment.

== Filmography ==
Year	Title	Role	Notes
2008	As the World Turns	Leo Morrisey	3 episodes
2008	Gossip Girl	Ben Simmons	1 episode
2009	Guiding Light	James Spaulding	April - September 2009
2010–15	The Bold and the Beautiful	Oliver Jones	January 20, 2010 – July 27, 2015
2013	The Young and the Restless	Oliver Jones	3 episodes (May 21, 2013; May 31, 2013; September 20, 2013)

== Awards and nominations ==
Year	Award	Category	Work	Result	Ref
2010	Daytime Emmy Award	Outstanding Younger Actor in a Drama Series	Guiding Light	Nominated	
