= Oliver Jones (The Bold and the Beautiful) =

- The Bold and the Beautiful character
- Portrayed by: Zack Conroy
- Duration: 2010–15
- First appearance: January 20, 2010
- Last appearance: July 27, 2015
- Created by: Bradley Bell
- Introduced by: Bradley Bell
- Book appearances: Stormswept (2014)
- Crossover appearances: The Young and the Restless
In-universe information
- Occupation: Photographer
- Sisters: Agnes Jones
- Grandfathers: Whipple Jones Sr.
- Uncles: Whipple Jones Jr.
- Aunts: Joy Jones
- First cousins: Whipple Jones III

Oliver Jones is a fictional character in the CBS soap opera The Bold and the Beautiful. Zack Conroy originated the role in January 2010. In 2013, the character crossed over to The Young and the Restless for two episodes.

== Casting ==
Executive producer and headwriter Bradley Bell announced the casting of Zack Conroy as Oliver Jones in late 2009. He stated, "Zack is a dynamic young actor. I'm excited to expand the Jones family off the talent of Rick Hearst and Sarah Brown. I look forward to seeing Zack bring this artistic and enthusiastic character to life.” Conroy began taping on December 10, 2009, and first aired on January 20, 2010.

On April 5, 2013, a crossover event between The Bold and the Beautiful and The Young and the Restless was announced involving Jones’ character. His appearances on The Young and the Restless were May 21 and 31, 2013. He appeared on the show again later in the year on September 20, 2013.

== Storylines ==
In January 2010, Agnes' younger brother, Oliver, arrives at Jackie M. Designs to surprise her. After telling her that he decided to relocate to LA, Oliver promptly lands a job at Insomnia Café as a DJ. On his first night, Oliver flirts with Hope Logan, and the two quickly become good friends. Soon after their initial interactions, Oliver surprises Hope by kissing her. Across the room, however, Steffy Forrester, also seemingly interested in Oliver, watches him with intrigue.

Just a few days after meeting, Hope is drugged and almost raped by sexual predator Graham Darros. After being rescued by her former stepfather Nick Marone and admitted to the hospital, Hope becomes even more smitten with Oliver after he shows up and comforts her with a teddy bear. After being released from the hospital, Hope and Oliver decide to go steady.

Steffy Forrester, Hope's step-sister, decides she wants Oliver for herself so she can beat Hope and get Brooke Logan out of Forrester Creations. She makes it her goal to convince Stephanie to let her harass Brooke and enlists the help of her great-aunt Pamela Douglas to help with the assault. At one point she dresses up in sexy black lingerie and straddles him and tells him to leave Hope for her and she'll give him money and power. Oliver tells her no and that he loves Hope and he'll never love her like he loves Hope. She leaves upset still intended on getting her way.

At Whip and Taylor's wedding Steffy becomes furious at Oliver's obvious choice and pushes cake into Hope's face and walks away. Oliver and Hope just look at each other and laugh and kiss each other instead while eating the cake. Steffy, in the meantime, begins to wonder if she'll ever get Oliver to be her man.

Liam Cooper and Pamela Douglas, which Steffy is later falsely blamed for a fired by her father, to set up the head sign to say "Future Ho" in the back of Hope as she models a dress and gives her take on "Hope for the Future". Hope starts like a deer in headlights but after she focuses on Oliver's smile and his encouraging eyes she continues to talk and becomes more confident calling it "Hope for the Future because that's what our society needs today." She sold the campaign much to Steffy's dismay. She tells Pam she has to get Oliver away from Hope. He somehow some way was her grounding force that kept her stable and in control.

Oliver gave Hope a two-part Chinese necklace expressing their love and he wore one-half of it to the party and she was supposed to wear the other half but left it at the office. Marcus took Hope's necklace away from Steffy after she seriously considered going there to have sex with Oliver to break them up but decided not to since her father gave her an adamant warning not to interfere in Oliver and Hope's relationship.

At this party Hope encouraged her mother to dress up like her and Hope went upstairs as Brooke Logan continued to dance with her mask on. Oliver came to the party and saw the necklace and put his mask on assuming it was Hope. He was dressed exactly like Ridge Forrester so Brooke assumed it was him. She ran over and whispered in his ear she's ready, which is what Hope said she'd do once she was ready to finally give her virginity to him. So when Brooke did this he followed her out to the terrace and they had sex. After coming from the party Hope comes out and he looks stunned wondering who it was he just had sex with and he became panicked after seeing Brooke take the mask off. Brooke totally unaware of the situation acted nicely and motherly since she assumed it was Ridge.

The Pose tune continues to play in her head and she continues to needle her husband Ridge about their risque rendezvous which he is totally dumbfounded by. After realizing he really has no idea what she's talking about she finally confronts Oliver.

Oliver starts to question as to why Brooke couldn't tell who he was and she questions him on why he would think a virgin girl would want to have sex in a wild environment like that. They stop the accusations and make an agreement to keep it as their secret.

Brooke later tells Ridge what happened between her and Oliver. Ridge forgives Brooke for what happened, understanding that it was a mistake. Ridge, however, does let Brooke know that Hope might not be as forgiving as he is when and if she finds out.

Steffy starts to put two and two together and accuses Oliver of having sex with Brooke the night of the party. He drops a group of CD's and she asks her dad if he was wearing a hoodie. He says he wasn't and she makes the statement, "I own you Brooke." Steffy later regrets saying those words after a very angry Ridge confronts her after finding out about her blackmailing Brooke.

Steffy blackmails Oliver to leave Hope and become her boyfriend or she'll tell Hope about him and her mother. She also wants Brooke to leave Forrester Creations. Her blackmailing ends up blowing up in her face, thanks to Ridge finding out from Brooke.

Oliver tells Hope to go to East College and she accepts but warns him to stay away from Steffy. In the meantime, Hope is suspicious as to why Oliver is telling her to go to college and believes that Steffy has something to do with it. Hope then decides not to go to college, which leaves Oliver confused. Steffy, meanwhile, pays the price for her dirty deeds when Ridge tells her that he knows what she did to Brooke, Oliver and Hope, and tells her it ends right now.

Steffy's tribute to Brooke reveals Oliver and Brooke's mistaken hook up and Hope's eyes widen in embarrassment and terror as Ridge tries to calm down and stop the media and camera flashes from going out of control. She sees the guilty look on Brooke's face and Oliver's and realizes it's true. Hope comes close to having a nervous breakdown as she constantly imagines her mother and boyfriend having sexual intercourse over and over again. According to Oliver, the music and lights disoriented him and he heard her say the words "I'm ready." And she told him she'd say that when she wanted to have that moment. And when he heard her mom say it to him and he was dressed up like her dad he had no idea it was Brooke since the four of them were dressed alike. She tells him it doesn't matter. He should have known by her eye color and by her personality. He tells her he just loved her so much and wanted her so bad and that that's how he loved her. If she wanted him to love her anywhere then he'd love her there. It still didn't faze Hope who was disappointed with him and she tells him, "You just wanted to get laid." Several times she tries to forgive him but is unable to do so.

Despite having singer and former American Idol contestant Jason Castro serenade her with a love song in order to win her back, Hope tells Oliver that it's over between them and gives him the necklace he gave her.

Hope finally decides to forgive Oliver after he takes her out in the courtyard to view her name Hope written across the moon. Oliver kisses her several times and she doesn't see her mom and him kissing in her mind anymore. Hope tells her mom it'll take time to forgive her but not to think she'll ever forget. So for now Oliver is forgiven and Brooke is still standing on the fence in regards to her relationship with her daughter. Oliver is unaware that Liam Spencer, the former Spencer Publication intern, has his eyes on Hope as well. Hope likes Liam as a friend but they already kissed while she and Oliver were on a break. Liam turns out to be the son of Bill Spencer, Jr.

Unable to cope with his sexual misadventure with her mother, Hope dumps Oliver and starts dating Liam Spencer. They both announce their love for each other in front of Brooke and Ridge. Oliver is besides himself and makes it known to Liam that he's the reason for their break up.

After Hope becomes involved with Liam, Steffy makes it her goal to go after Liam now and no longer wants Oliver.

Liam and Oliver almost get into a fist fight after Liam comes bearing an olive branch with words of advice to Oliver. "Stay away from Hope. She's made her choice." Oliver makes it known to him he's not giving up on their relationship and he blames Liam for breaking them up. They nearly come to blows before Ridge stepped into the room.

After the break up, Oliver dates Hope's ex-sister-in-law Amber Moore so he can make Hope jealous and hopefully have her end things with Liam. Amber decides to pursue Liam as well, so she and her mother, Tawny, can get their hands on the Spencer fortune. Amber finds out that she is pregnant and isn't sure who the father is. On June 20, 2011, both Oliver and Liam are proven not to be the father thanks to a DNA test. Marcus Forrester is the father.

Oliver is now working for Forrester Creations as a photographer and is seen assisting with the campaigning for Hope's 'Hope for the Future' fashion line. Oliver and Hope later bond again over their past together after Liam ends his relationship with Hope and chooses to be with his ex-wife Steffy.

On January 22, 2014, while waiting for an elevator, Oliver told Maya (who is engaged to Carter Walton) how much he enjoys photographing her and the two kissed.

During a brief talk with Liam, Alexandria Forrester claimed that she never had a boyfriend, and Liam said that at the right moment she would know. Oliver was taking photos of Aly. Oliver kept complimenting her, which made Aly feel special although Oliver already had eyes on Maya who was still engaged to Carter. Aly made it clear that she had to go but Oliver asked her which one she liked the best. Aly said she doesn't like pictures of herself because she thinks of herself as average unlike the other beautiful Forrester women. Ridge decided to take over Forrester again by firing Oliver because of his below average shots and tried to kick Rick out of his presidency. Eric decided to side with Rick after Brooke meddled with the situation and Oliver was rehired. Oliver claimed because his last name isn't Forrester, there's not a definite chance he'll stay. Oliver offered to take Aly out for lunch. At the Bikini Bar, they had lunch with Maya and Carter in the same restaurant. Aly ordered a hot green tea which Oliver accidentally spilled all over her hand and wiped up and then kissed her hand. Aly went to her room and told this to Darla Forrester, her mother who appears to her as a ghost. Darla supported it. Oliver came to her room to return what she left at the Bikini Bar. He also came to check up on her and she was very nervous, this being her first kiss and boyfriend. They ended up making out and when she heard Pam, she told him to go in the closet in which he left afterward.

Oliver revealed to Maya that he is only showing interest in Aly in order to solidify his position at Forrester Creations. Maya taped this conversation and played it to Carter, who stated it could've been taken out of context. Maya played it for Rick and Caroline who tried to understand Oliver's side and confronted him, believing he has genuine feelings for Aly. Oliver decided to tell Aly the truth before it came out. Aly was hurt and upset. Aly, Pam, and Charlie went to Medieval night without him and Oliver dressed up in the knight's costume in the show and threw Aly a carnation. Oliver and Aly stayed together. When Aly died, he left his job at Forrester and went to Europe.

== Reception ==
In 2022, Charlie Mason from Soaps She Knows placed Oliver as a "Bonus entry" on his ranked list of The Bold and the Beautiful’s Best of the Best Characters Ever, calling him a "Forrester photographer" who was "passed around like a hand-me-down sweater" and commenting on how he accidentally had sex with Brooke. In 2024, Mason placed Oliver and Hope 35th on his ranked list of The Bold and the Beautiful's 40 Greatest Couples of All Time, commenting, "You never forget your first love. Well, unless you're Brooke's daughter... Then, er, maybe. But we never forgot her first love, the Forrester Creations photographer for whom she "developed" strong feelings." Mason also put Oliver's pairing with Aly 28th on the list and wrote, "At last, Hope's ex lived down the embarrassment of his masked hookup with Brooke... only for his innocent subsequent girlfriend to go bat-guano-crazy and get herself turned into roadkill. Some guys have all the luck; others, like Oliver, none."
