= Karla Mosley =

American actress and singer

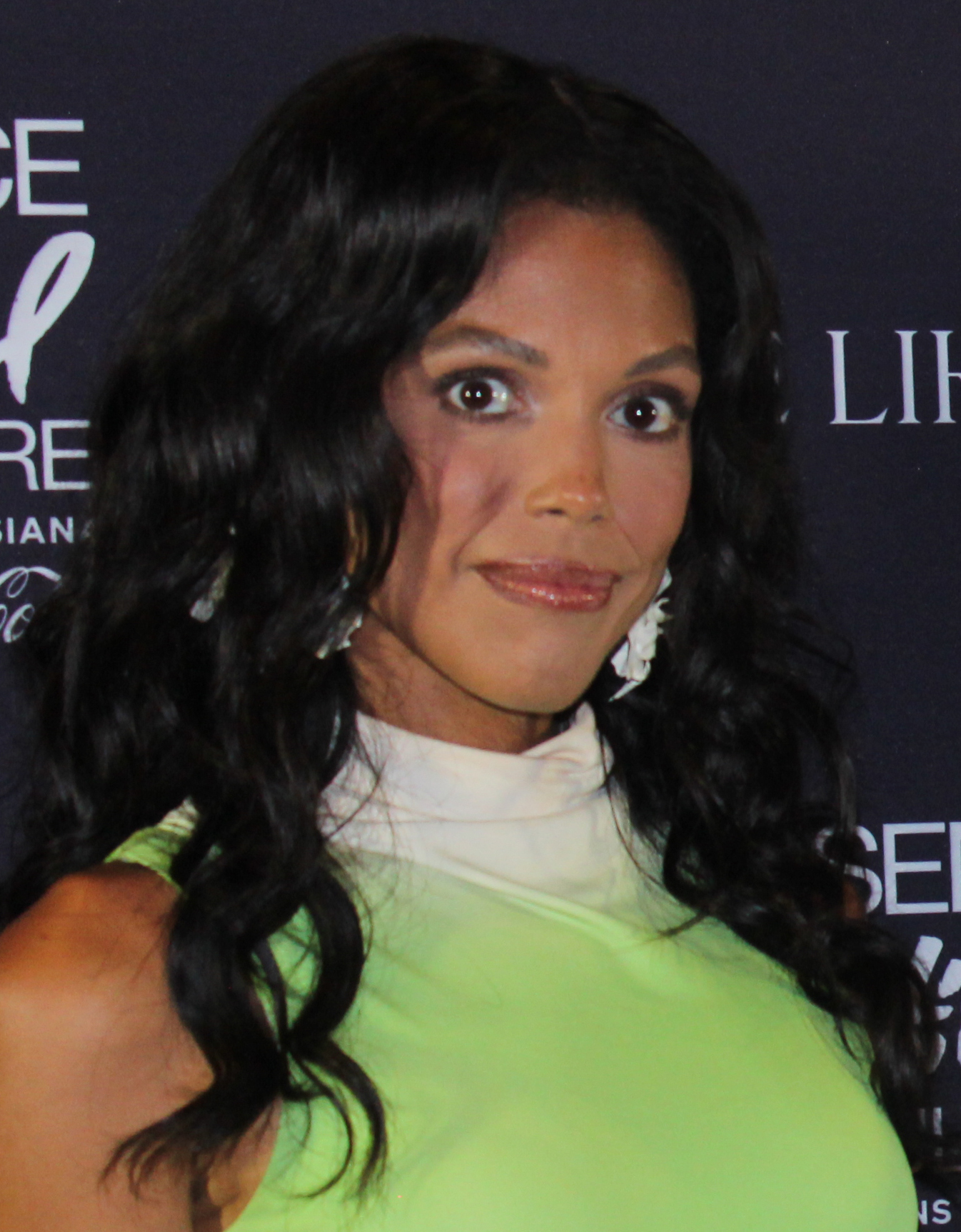
- Mosley in 2025
- Born: Karla Cheatham Mosley; August 27, 1981 (age 45); Westchester County, New York, U.S.
- Other name: Karla Mosley
- Occupations: Actress, singer
- Years active: 2003–present
- Partner: John Rogers
- Children: 2

Karla Cheatham Mosley (born August 27, 1981) is an American actress and singer. She starred on the Emmy-nominated children's show Hi-5; she has starred in numerous plays and also had minor roles in several other TV shows and films. She regularly appeared as Christina Moore Boudreau in the soap opera Guiding Light and as Maya Avant in The Bold and the Beautiful. As of 2025, she stars as Dani Dupree on Beyond the Gates, receiving a Daytime Emmy Award nomination for Outstanding Lead Actress in a Drama Series in 2026.

== Early years ==
Karla Cheatham Mosley was born and raised in Westchester County, New York. She graduated from New York University's Tisch School of the Arts, and went on to study in France at the Roy Hart Vocal Institute.

At a young age, Mosley performed in Sugar Beats, a children's rock group created by Sherry Goffin Kondor, daughter of singer/writer, Carole King.

== Career ==
=== Hi-5 (2003–2006) ===
In 2003, while still in college, Mosley joined the American counterpart of the Australian children's TV show Hi-5, where she became the youngest member of the group. Her segment was called "Body Move", where she led viewers in stretching, exercising and funny dancing. She was usually the transitional member of the group, performing her skits in between other cast members' acts. She also provided the voice of Chatterbox on the show. In 2006, Mosley left the cast in order to pursue other interests.

=== Daytime success (2008–present) ===
From 2008 to 2009, Mosley acted in the CBS daytime soap opera Guiding Light, playing the role of Christina Boudreau, a pre-med student who married Remy Boudreau (played by Lawrence Saint-Victor).

In 2013, Mosley joined the cast of the CBS daytime soap opera The Bold and the Beautiful, playing ex-con turned actress Maya Avant. She completed a web series titled Room 8 The Series with her The Bold and the Beautiful co-star Lawrence Saint-Victor; the web series was part of The Bold and the Beautiful storyline. Mosley's character was later revealed to be a transgender woman, becoming the first transgender bride to be married on daytime television when she married Rick Forrester (played by Jacob Young) in 2015. Mosley was taken off-contract on The Bold and the Beautiful in March 2019, but continued to appear on the series in a recurring capacity. On October 10, 2020, Mosley announced that she had left The Bold and the Beautiful.

In April 2021, Mosley briefly took on the role of Amanda Sinclair on the CBS soap opera The Young and the Restless as a short-term substitute for Mishael Morgan, who took a brief leave to recuperate from eye surgery.

In 2024, it was announced Mosley was joining the cast of Beyond the Gates as Dani Dupree. The soap premiered February 24, 2025 on CBS.

=== Other roles ===
Mosley most recently appeared in a Hallmark production (5/2020) "How to Train Your Husband". Mosley also appears in many local New York City venues (including for a time as the featured performer for the Gray Line Show Business Insider Tour), sometimes as singer, sometimes actor.

In 2007, Mosley starred in the musical production of Dreamgirls at the TUTS Theater in Houston, TX. Mosley appeared in the children's off-Broadway production, Max and Ruby in 2007–2008. Additionally, she had a part in the Coen Brothers film, Burn After Reading, which opened in September 2008. Mosley will also be seen in the indy film, Red Hook.

In 2008, Mosley starred with Lenelle Moise in "Expatriate", a gritty off-Broadway show at the Culture Project. Her performance earned rave reviews from the New York Times, Time Out New York and Variety, which wrote: "Mosley's voice is a serious discovery, with remarkable phrasing and range. In a torchy number called 'The Makings,' about how Alphine's life has given her the makings of a jazz legend, her pure high notes descend to earthy growls in a flash, and you've got to believe her when she sings, 'Anything I wails/hits ears like honey.'" In 2008 she also nabbed parts in Law & Order and Gossip Girl and appeared in Museum Pieces at the West End Theater in New York City.

In 2013, Mosley appeared in several episodes of Hart of Dixie. Mosley also appeared in commercials sponsoring Abreva and Riders by Lee jeans. On November 18, 2014, Karla appeared as a model on The Price Is Right. She appeared in the sixth episode of Battle Creek on April 5, 2015, titled "Cereal Killer".

In 2018 she played Nicole in the film, How to Train Your Puppy/Husband.

== Activism ==
Mosley sits on the board of Covenant House, the largest privately funded agency in the Americas providing shelter and other services to homeless, runaway and throwaway youth. She is a celebrity ambassador for the National Eating Disorders Association and is active in other charities.

After Hurricane Katrina, Mosley organized a benefit concert by Hi-5 to raise money for victims of Hurricane Katrina. She co-produced and performed in Broadway for Obama, a benefit concert during the 2008 presidential campaign. She also performed in Broadway for a New America's concert for marriage equality and in Western Queens for Marriage Equality's rally for equality.

== Personal life ==
Mosley has one sister and two cats. Mosely was previously married to NYC lawyer, Jeremiah Frei-Pearson. On August 17, 2018, she gave birth to her first child, with boyfriend John Rogers. In March 2025, Mosley identified herself as queer.

== Awards and nominations ==
List of awards and nominations
Year	Award	Category	Work	Result	Ref.
2014	NAACP Image Award	Outstanding Actress in a Daytime Drama Series	The Bold and the Beautiful	Nominated	
2018	BlackStar Film Festival	Jury Prize: Best Narrative Short (shared with Desha Ducuan and Tina Huang)	Xin	Nominated	
2026	Daytime Emmy Award	Outstanding Lead Actress in a Drama Series	Beyond the Gates	Nominated	
