= Shaun Taylor-Corbett =

American actor, singer and writer (born 1978)

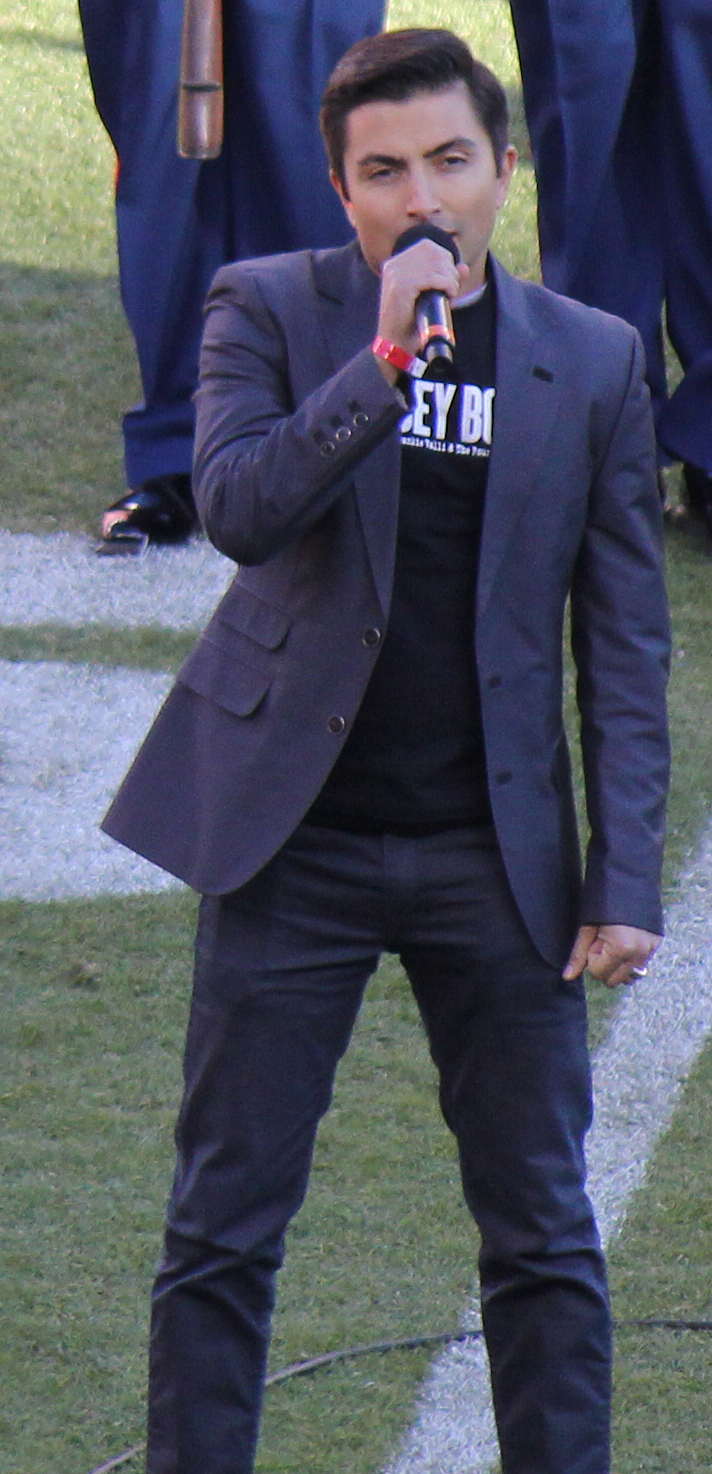
- Shaun Taylor-Corbett in 2014
- Born: Shaun Michael Taylor-Corbett; October 6, 1978 (age 47); Jennersville, Pennsylvania
- Education: University of Delaware
- Occupations: Actor; Singer; Writer
- Years active: 2003–present

Shaun Michael Taylor-Corbett or I’Pyooksisstiiko’om (born October 6, 1978) is an American actor, singer and writer. Taylor-Corbett is known for his roles in Jersey Boys (2nd National Tour), In the Heights by Lin-Manuel Miranda, and Between Two Knees by The 1491s. He also stars as 'Darrell Walters' in the musical he co-created, Distant Thunder, and is a prolific audiobook narrator with credits including There There by Tommy Orange, The Only Good Indians by Stephen Graham Jones, and Black Sun by Rebecca Roanhorse.

== Early life ==
Shaun Michael Taylor-Corbett was born on October 6, 1978, in Jennersville, Pennsylvania, and is the only son of choreographer Lynne Taylor-Corbett and Music Executive Michael Corbett. He has three sisters. He was raised in Rockville Centre, New York. I’Pyooksisstiiko’om is mixed-race and of Blackfeet, Scandinavian, and Black descent.

Taylor-Corbett graduated from the University of Delaware, where he sang for an a cappella group called the University of Delaware YChromes. He was also the vice president of the university's World Peace Club and was an honors student. He received vocal training from Shirley Callaway.

After college, Taylor-Corbett joined The New York Public Theater, where he performed Shakespeare. He also joined the Harrington Theater Arts Company and appeared on the soap opera All My Children many times. Taylor-Corbett also played Romeo in Shakespeare's Romeo and Juliet at the McCarter Theater in Princeton, New Jersey.

== Career ==
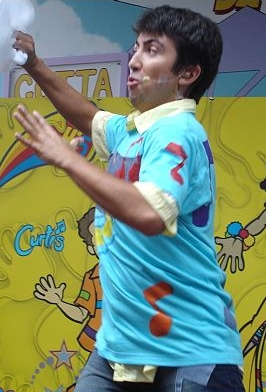
Taylor-Corbett performs at a Hi-5 concert.

In 2003, Taylor-Corbett joined Hi-5, the American counterpart to the Australian kids' show of the same name. In Hi-5, his segment is Shapes in Space, where he would play with play objects, as if they were real life objects, like a giant pyramid and a tunnel. Taylor-Corbett would also explain the functions of shapes as well as performing three songs in each show: solo and as part of the Hi-5 band.

Taylor-Corbett left Hi-5 in 2006 to further pursue his performing career. He played Juan in the hit Off-Broadway musical Altar Boyz from July 3, 2006 – May 6, 2007. He also appeared on Broadway in the play In the Heights.
