= Sean Richards =

- Sunset Beach character
- Portrayed by: Randy Spelling
- Duration: 1997–99
- First appearance: January 10, 1997
- Last appearance: December 31, 1999
- Created by: Robert Guza, Jr.
- Introduced by: Gary Tomlin, Aaron Spelling and E. Duke Vincent
In-universe information
- Occupation: Student; Waiter; Trainee lifeguard
- Father: Gregory Richards
- Mother: Olivia Richards
- Stepmother: Annie Richards (1998–1999)
- Sisters: Caitlin Richards Deschanel
- Half-brothers: Trey Deschanel

Sean Richards is a fictional character from the US NBC soap opera Sunset Beach, played by Randy Spelling.

== Character development ==
In 1997, it was announced that Randy Spelling had been cast as Sean. Spelling is the son of Sunset Beach creator Aaron Spelling. Sean was billed as a "screwed up rich kid, recently expelled from private school."

Sean was featured in a high-profile storyline in which an earthquake and tsunami occur in Sunset Beach. The storyline was created in a bid to gain ratings. Spelling's character becomes trapped under water with on-screen love interest Emily Davis (Cristi Harris). Spelling and Harris were required to perform stunts sequences for the scenes, though, Spelling said were fun to film. On-screen characters were flung into the sea from a capsized boat. While Spelling was dropped down an eighty degree incline wall into a water tank. Then had to tread water, until he and Harris dove down wearing formal clothes, into the safety of an air shaft. Spelling said that they found the experience "really disorienting".

== Storylines ==
Sean is the son of Gregory (Sam Behrens) and Olivia Richards (Lesley-Anne Down) who always tried to find his way into life. He started a romance with Tiffany Thorne (Adrienne Frantz) and found himself in a triangle with Tiffany and Mark Wolper (Nick Stabile) he battled for her love, although it turned out that she was a gold digger. At the time, Sean was involved in a Del Douglas (John Reilly) murder mystery, when he saw a woman leaving his apartment on the night of the murder. It was eventually revealed that the person was Elaine Stevens (Leigh Taylor-Young) Sean and Tiffany became closer, but when Gregory offered money to Tiffany to get out town, she accepted it and left. The next few months, Sean was involved in a storyline in which Gregory tried to get rid of Cole, but he soon learned the truth, realizing that his father was lying to him all the time.

In December 1997, Sean asked his ex-girlfriend, Elizabeth to attend a New Year's Eve party on an island and she accepted, but a mysterious killer murdered her on the boat. Sean thought Elizabeth didn't want to come, so he invited another girl, Amy Nielsen (Krissy Carlson) both Amy and Sean survived the Terror Island storyline, but it took a lot of time for Amy to get through what she experienced. In June 1998, Sean met Emily and they fell in love, but their love was constantly tested by Amy, who always tried to find a way to break them up and get Sean, also using Brad Niklaus (Michael Strickland) the teens were later involved in the Shockwave storyline and the Rosario jewels.

Amy's plot paid off when she used a potion that she bought from Mrs. Moreau and led Sean to her bed. Sean and Emily broke up after Emily learned the truth, and Sean also left Amy. At the very end, Sean ended with his true love and Amy decided to find love with Brad.

== Reception ==
Charlie Catchpole of the Daily Mirror said the only reason Spelling was cast as Sean was because his father created the series. Ester G. Dipasupil of the Manila Standard said that Gregory finding out that Sean stood in for Cole Deschanel (Eddie Cibrian) in jail, was a "riveting revelation" and said it made an "exciting episode". Julia Shih of The Michigan Daily opined that Sean was well acted by Spelling.
