= Olivia Richards =

- Sunset Beach character
- Portrayed by: Lesley-Anne Down
- Duration: 1997–99
- First appearance: January 6, 1997
- Last appearance: December 31, 1999
- Created by: Robert Guza, Jr.
- Introduced by: Gary Tomlin, Aaron Spelling and E. Duke Vincent
In-universe information
- Occupation: Broadcasting Executive
- Father: Thomas Blake
- Husband: Gregory Richards (1975–98)
- Sons: Sean Richards; Trey Deschanel
- Daughters: Caitlin Deschanel

Olivia Richards (also Blake) is a fictional character from the US NBC soap opera Sunset Beach, played by Lesley-Anne Down.

== Character development ==
In November 1996, it was announced that Lesley-Anne Down had been cast into the role of Olivia. She was billed as a "troubled alcoholic" and the "trophy ex-wife" of Gregory Richards (Sam Behrens). The serial's creator and producer Aaron Spelling, originally named the character "Sheila", however Down looked through a list of potential names and requested that it be changed to Olivia. Olivia was also billed as one of the serial's lead characters.

Olivia was featured in a high-profile storyline in which an earthquake and tsunami occur in Sunset Beach. The storyline was created in a bid to gain ratings. In the storyline Olivia becomes trapped underneath her mansion home. Down agreed to do some stunts herself and was placed in a makeshift set of rubble and timber. Down was required to wear safety matter to prevent actual harm to herself. Down said she complete confidence in the production. However, in one scene a stunt double was used to drop a chandelier onto Olivia in the wreckage. Down admitted she was glad that she did not have to perform the stunt.

Sometimes I dream about Olivia. I'm shaking her, telling her what to do. I get upset for Olivia sometimes. She's so unhappy and so miserable, and I don't like to see anybody in pain."

— —Lesley-Anne Down on Olivia.

== Storylines ==
Olivia is introduced as the ex-wife of Gregory, and the mother of Caitlin Richards Deschanel (Vanessa Dorman) and Sean Richards (Randy Spelling). She is revealed to be a recovered alcoholic and the secret lover of Del Douglas (John Reilly). Olivia was enemies with his daughter, Annie Douglas (Sarah Buxton). When Del is murdered, Olivia and Annie are both suspects, but Elaine Stevens (Leigh Taylor-Young) is the real murderer. Olivia is angry when she discovers Gregory's scheme to ruin Caitlin's relationship with jewel thief Cole Deschanel (Eddie Cibrian). Olivia has a flash back and realizes that she has slept with Cole. Olivia soon discovers that Cole is the son of her former lover, A.J. Deschanel (Gordon Thomson) and Elaine Stevens. Olivia becomes pregnant and is unsure whether Cole and Gregory is the father. Caitlin manages to prevent Olivia from having an abortion. Caitlin then discovers that she too is pregnant. Gregory ruins Sean's relationship with Tiffany Thorne (Jennifer Banko-Stewart) so he can perfect his plan to get Caitlin away from Cole.

As Gregory is unaware of Olivia's pregnancy, he asks her to pretend she is pregnant and later fake a miscarriage. Gregory thinks that they will be able to guilt Caitlin into giving them their baby and ruining her relationship with Cole in the process. Meanwhile, Annie is scheming to steal Gregory from Olivia, she tries to convince Olivia they are having an affair. Gregory changes his mind and says he will pay a doctor to tell Caitlin her baby is dead after labour. Caitlin finds out about the plot and fakes her own death in a car accident. Though Caitlin loses her baby, so she enlists Annie to help gain revenge. Annie lures Olivia into a country cabin and includes her labour, drugs her and steals her baby, giving it to Caitlin. Annie drugged Olivia to believe that she lost her baby through drinking excess alcohol.

"The mature slut/bitch. Olivia is 45 years old and in response to a philandering but very rich ex-husband, found her own substitute sex partners, one of whom was the future husband of her daughter. So now, the once pregnant Olivia has to ponder whether the child she produced came from her ex-husband or her son-in-law. Of course, that child was stolen from her at birth by Annie and given to Olivia's daughter, to replace the fetus lost in a car accident. This means that Olivia is pretending to be the grandmother of her own child, sired by either her former husband or her current son-in-law! Are you keeping up?"

— The Journal of Sex Research on Olivia. (1999)

Olivia's divorce to Gregory comes through, and Gregory marries Annie. Olivia moves on with her life, even though she suspects that her baby may still be alive. Olivia meets up with her first lover, A.J. and they later reconcile their relationship. Olivia discovers the truth about Annie's scheme and realises that her daughter asked Annie to help her find a baby. Olivia's family falls apart when the truth about Caitlin and Annie's plan is made public. Further trouble ensues when Caitlin finds out about Olivia and Cole's affair. Olivia was then trapped in an earthquake and she tried grew attached to Trey.

Olivia continues her relationship with A.J., Gregory is presumed dead after falling into the ocean and he comes back pretending to be Tobias Richards; a relative. Olivia, along with Annie, fight for Gregory's will and she claims everything belonged to her son, Trey. Annie is keen on doing anything to get the money, so she asks Mrs. Moreau to give her a potion that will force Olivia to start drinking again. The family is disappointed to see Olivia drinking again and her family disown her. Annie's plan is revealed by Gregory (as Tobias in disguise) who threatens Mrs. Moreau. Gregory's final battle is meant to be his victory, but he ends up in prison, where Olivia is relieved to see him end up. Olivia's broken family return and she was happy to see everything normal again. She raised Trey, her daughter was happy with Cole, Gregory was behind bars. Olivia and A.J. decide to end their relationship, and he starts a romance with her best friend, Bette Katzenkazrahi (Kathleen Noone).

== Reception ==
In 1997, for her portrayal of Olivia, Down won the award for "Best Actress" at the Soap Opera Update Awards. Charlie Catchpole of the Daily Mirror said as the "beautiful rich but tragic" Olivia, Down was "out-Sue-Ellening Sue-Ellen" in terms of tragic events they both endure. He also opined that Olivia should not have worried so much about her flashbacks, because they looked unrealistic. Justine Elias of The New York Times said Down and Buxton showed signs of "becoming a classic matchup of battling soap opera vixens" in the respective roles of Olivia and Annie. Candace Havens of The Vindicator praised Sunset Beach for its casting of Down, Berhens and Noone and opined it was "one thing" producers got right. While Julia Shih of The Michigan Daily opined that "credit should go to Lesley-Anne Down whose portrayal of a woman torn by her emotions is excellent". John Millar of the Daily Record quipped that Olivia's car accident and subsequent situation in the tsunami were "nothing serious" and said it was another "regular week" in the serial. Sharon Feinstein of the Daily Mirror said that Olivia was a "wealthy super bitch" and a nineties version of Alexis Colby (Joan Collins) from Dynasty. In 2008, Luke Kerr from Daytime Confidential wrote that he "really enjoyed" the character.
