= Lyudmila Gnilova =

Lyudmila Vladimirovna Gnilova (Russian: Людмила Владимировна Гнилова; born February 12, 1944) is a Russian and Soviet actress and voice actress. She was awarded as a Meritorious Artist (since 1982).

== Biography ==
Starting from 1964, Gnilova debuted as the role of Lenka in "Dalnie strany" (Distant countries). She worked in the Central Children's theater in Moscow and was the wife of the former actor Alexander Solovyov, until his death in 2000.

== Filmography ==
- Dalnie strany (1964) - Lenka.
- An Easy Life (1964).
- Dayte zhalobnuyu knigu (1964).
- Dvadtsat let spustya (1965).
- Give me a complaints book (1965).
- Encore, Once More Encore! (1992) - Barhatova.
- Dikiy (2009) - mother-in-law.

== Voice-over roles ==
=== Animated films ===
- Maria, Mirabela.
- Glasha and Kikimora.
- Vaniusha and The Giant
- The Adventures of Scamper the Penguin - Pepe.
- The Blue Bird
- AMBA

=== Dubbing (film and television) ===
- ALF.
- Babel - Amelia (Adriana Barraza).
- Bones - Parker Booth (Ty Panitz), Angela Montenegro (Michaela Conlin), and Caroline Julian (Patricia Belcher).
- Dynasty - Alexis (Joan Collins).
- ER - All female roles.
- Grandma's Boy - Bea (Shirley Knight).
- Mr. Destiny - Ellen Jane Burrows/Robertson (Linda Hamilton).
- Primeval - Ben Trent (Jack Montgomery).
- The Race - Madame Jo (Josiane Balasko).
- Shallow Ground - Helen Reedy (Patty McCormack).
- Sunset Beach - Olivia Richards (Lesley-Anne Down), Annie Douglas Richards (Sarah G. Buxton), and Virginia Harrison (Dominique Jennings).
- Terra Nostrea - Anjélica (Paloma Duarte).
- The X-Files - Dana Scully (Gillian Anderson) and other female roles.
- What Women Want - Dr. J.M. Perkins (Bette Midler).
- X-Men Origins: Wolverine - Heather Hudson (Julia Blake).

=== Dubbing (animated films and cartoons) ===
- Animaniacs - Dot Warner, Skippy.
- Bonkers - Fawn Deer.
- Chip and Dale Rescue Rangers (season 1) — Tammy, Bink, Mother Squirrel, Queenie
- DuckTales - Louie, Webby.
- Disney's Adventures of the Gummi Bears - Sunni Gummi, Princess Calla.
- Gnomeo & Juliet - Ms. Montague.
- Howl's Moving Castle - Grandma Sophie.
- My Life as a Teenage Robot - Tuck.
- Princess Mononoke - San.
- Sally the Witch - All children and female roles.
- Tales from the Crypt - Old Witch and other female roles.
- TaleSpin - Molly Cunningham.
- The Simpsons (Season 17) - All female and children roles.
