= Tim Truman (Sunset Beach) =

- Sunset Beach character
- Portrayed by: Dax Griffin
- Duration: 1997–99
- First appearance: January 6, 1997
- Last appearance: December 31, 1999
- Created by: Robert Guza, Jr.
- Introduced by: Gary Tomlin, Aaron Spelling and E. Duke Vincent
In-universe information
- Occupation: Chauffeur; Shareholder of Liberty Corporation

Tim Truman is a fictional character from the US NBC soap opera Sunset Beach, played by Dax Griffin from January 6, 1997, to December 31, 1999.

== Development ==
Griffin secured the role of "bad guy" character Tim shortly after he moved to Los Angeles and it was his first television role. Griffin originally auditioned for another character in the series and was unsuccessful. One month later, producers invited Griffin back to audition for the role of Tim. Griffin was working as a bartender when he was informed that he had won the role. Of his casting the actor stated "I couldn't ask for a better opportunity than to start on an Aaron Spelling show. It's a dream come true." Griffin's casting was announced prior the show's debut on NBC and he was featured in promotional photographs. Candace Havens of The World reported that Griffin was one of many male cast members employed by Aaron Spelling to have the "hunk factor". Griffin was initially nervous because Tim was his first television role. Griffin told Rebecca May of Stevens Point Journal that he "annoyed" writers by asking too many questions about Tim's characterisation. After one year on-screen, Griffin felt more confident, adding "my character is kept pretty realistic, and the writers told me they like what I've done with him."

Tim is one of Sunset Beach's twenty-one original characters. Writers quickly established Tim as a trouble-making character and featured him in various disaster style storylines, including the Terror Island and Shockwave plots. Tim's characterisation as a trouble-maker worried Griffin, who thought such a character would not have longevity. He told William Keck from Soap Opera Digest that "I was more concerned when the show first started, I thought after I stirred up a little trouble in Sunset Beach, it might be the end of my character right off the bat." In another story the character spent a months worth of episodes in a coma. Producers reassured Griffin that the story would not end with Tim's death and "everything would be fine".

One of Tim's prominent stories was trying to snare his ex-girlfriend Meg Cummings (Susan Ward) from her new lover Ben Evans (Clive Robertson). When the series began, Tim and Meg were due to marry. Meg jilts Tim after she witnesses him kissing another woman. Meg flees to Sunset Beach in search of Ben, who she had been in contact with over the internet. Griffin wanted Tim to move on from Meg and let her find happiness with Ben. He also wanted writers to explore additional romances for his character. Griffin told Keck that "I think it would be funny as hell to see Tim hook up with Maria, and Ben make the decision to stay with Meg." Unlike other characters on the show, Tim was an "enigma" and had no fixed abode. Writers played Tim living in a hotel room and he gains employment from Gregory Richards (Sam Behrens). Viewers wondered how the character managed to earn his living and pay for his medical bills while in a coma. Griffin explained that "Gregory paid for everything - which helped out a lot. I'm kinda vague on this point, but I think Tim's still employed by him, even after he found out I gave my Liberty stock to Annie."

In Tim's departure storyline, he is murdered by Derek Evans (Clive Robertson) and Tim's girlfriend Tess Marin (Tracy Melchior) helps Derek to dispose of Tim's body. They bury Tim inside the foundations of a monument. When it is unveiled to the public, the monument cracks, leaving Tim's hand exposed and his body is discovered by the police. On December 5, 1999, Toby Goldstein from Oshkosh Northwestern reported that Griffin had reprised the role as the show neared its final episode.
