= Bette Katzenkazrahi =

- Sunset Beach character
- Portrayed by: Kathleen Noone
- Duration: 1997–1999
- First appearance: January 6, 1997
- Last appearance: December 31, 1999
- Created by: Robert Guza, Jr.
- Introduced by: Gary Tomlin, Aaron Spelling and E. Duke Vincent
In-universe information
- Occupation: Gossip columnist
- Brothers: Del Douglas
- Husband: Vincent Duke; Charles Lakin; Jeffrey Goodman; Al Kennedy
- Daughters: Emily Davis
- Nieces: Annie Douglas Richards

Bette Katzenkazrahi (nee Douglas; formerly Duke, Lakin, Goodman, Kennedy, and Davis) is a fictional character from the US NBC soap opera Sunset Beach, played by Kathleen Noone.

== Development ==
Carolyn Hinsey of the Daily News reported Noone's casting in November 1996. Noone previously appeared on daytime television for a number of years in fellow soap opera All My Children. Hinsey wrote that Noone had not ruled out a return to daytime television, after finding success in primetime, 'and she had said that she would embrace the chance to return if she found the right role. Of her casting in Sunset Beach, Noone commented: "This sounds like such fun." She later told Steve Gidlow of Inside Soap that when the character was explained to her, she thought that the role would be "delicious to play" and likened Bette to her favorite dessert, saying she was "that good!" Noone described Bette as "an Auntie Mame-type character".

In her fictional backstory, Bette has traveled around the world and has been married multiple times. She is a mother figure to Annie Douglas (Sarah G. Buxton). Noone called her character "outrageous" and said she gets away with saying things other people can only dream of. She also stated: "She's just so direct and open, which means she says it as she sees it. She's also kinda fun and brassy, and that's why the audience seems to like her so much."

Noone signed a new contract with the serial in August 1999, she also incorrectly predicted that Sunset Beach would not be axed by NBC. Of Bette, Noone stated: "She is a blast. They didn't use her properly on the show, but she was a blast. I'm sorry they didn't have the insight to do that, but they didn't. But on we go, you know? At least I got a chance to create her. And maybe I'll play something like this someplace else."

== Storylines ==
During the entire run, Bette was a much beloved person. Although she always knew the newest gossip and eventually ended up hired by Gregory Richards (Sam Behrens) as a gossip columnist, Bette was always fun and entertaining. She had been married seven times. During the first year, Bette was involved in a storyline involving her best friend Olivia Richards (Lesley-Anne Down). She supported her while knowing that Olivia had been in an affair with her daughter's boyfriend. She even lied to her best friend Elaine Stevens (Leigh Taylor-Young) about the whereabouts of her long-lost son. However, she did it all to protect the people she loved. Bette was also involved in a short story where her ex-husband Al Kennedy died in her hot tub.

Bette had also been flirting with Eddie Connors (Peter Barton) for a while, but their love never happened because Eddie was killed off. Later, the arrival of her daughter Emily Davis (Cristi Harris) in May 1998 brought a whole new story for Bette. Their relationship was rocky, so they slowly worked on becoming closer to each other, which they finally did. In 1999, during the end, Bette found love again in A.J. Deschanel (Gordon Thomson).

== Reception ==
For her portrayal of Bette, Noone was nominated in the category of "Female Scene Stealer" at the 1998 Soap Opera Digest Awards. The following year, Noone received a nomination for Outstanding Supporting Actress in a Drama Series at the Daytime Emmy Awards. Julia Shih of The Michigan Daily opined that Bette is one of the soap opera's most "annoying" characters because of her "sexual appetite". Inside Soap's Steve Gidlow disagreed, writing "Life is never dull with Aunt Bette Katzenkazrahi, Sunset Beach's most wacky and eccentric resident". Syndicated soap opera critic Nancy M. Reichardt thought that Noone was "over the top" in her initial portrayal of Bette, but she eventually "settled into her somewhat more realistic boundaries."
