= Meg Cummings =

- Sunset Beach character
- Susan Ward as Meg Cummings (1997)
- Portrayed by: Susan Ward (1997–99); Sydney Penny (1999)
- Duration: 1997–99
- First appearance: January 6, 1997
- Last appearance: December 31, 1999
- Created by: Robert Guza, Jr.
- Introduced by: Gary Tomlin, Aaron Spelling and E. Duke Vincent
In-universe information
- Occupation: Waitress; Executive Assistant; Business woman
- Father: Hank Cummings
- Mother: Joan Cummings
- Sisters: Sara Cummings
- Husband: Ben Evans (1999–present)
- First cousins: Tiffany Thorne

Meg Cummings is a fictional character from the American television soap opera Sunset Beach, played by Susan Ward. She made her first appearance during the episode broadcast on January 6, 1997. Meg was the show's protagonist throughout the whole run. Sydney Penny temporarily played the role while Ward was filming her role in the movie The In Crowd.

== Character development ==
Susan Ward was cast in the role of Meg after her agent submitted her for the role. Ward was already known to series creator Aaron Spelling after starring in his series Malibu Shores. Ward requested "to be put up for the nice girl", via her agent. She also said she preferred playing "nice girl" Meg more than mean characters she had previously played. Ward began filming a role in the 2000 film The In Crowd. While she had to leave on a temporary basis, Sydney Penny took over for one month, until Ward returned. The serial's creator, Spelling, was impressed with Penny's portrayal of Meg so he cast her in another series he created.

She thought she would meet her handsome friend and immediately ride off into the sunset. Yet as soon as she walked on the beach, she had her backpack stolen. She began to realize things were not as easy as she expected.

Meg is featured in the first scenes of Sunset Beach. Her storyline sees her arrive from Kansas to escape her unfaithful fiance Tim Truman (Dax Griffin) and find a man she has been talking to over the internet, Ben Evans (Clive Robertson). However, Meg is not aware of Ben's identity. Ward said that Meg is just a "small town girl" who "follows her heart". Meg wants to "find out what the world has to offer"; finding out the identity of her internet romance is the "first thing she has ever been passionate about."

In December 1998, a writer from Soap Opera Update previewed the soap's 1999 stories. They revealed that Meg's sister, Sara Cummings (Shawn Batten) would play a centric role in complicating the relationship between Meg, Ben and his ex-wife Maria Torres (Christina Chambers); as well as Sara's own with ruining her own relationship with Casey Mitchum (Timothy Adams). The show's head writer Margaret DePriest told the reporter that "Sara takes a more active role in her sister's life, and she makes a huge mistake which backfires on her, which ultimately affects [the aforementioned relationships]." Sunset Beach's final episode, which aired on December 31, 1999, featured the double wedding of Meg and Ben alongside Vanessa Hart (Sherri Saum) and Michael Bourne (Jason Winston George).

== Storylines ==
After leaving her fiancé Tim at the altar, Meg travelled to Sunset Beach to find a man she had been chatting with over the Internet. Without any knowledge as to that person's real identity, Meg slowly got to know the residents of the town, people who helped her when she fell off a pier after trying to catch a girl who stole her backpack. She took a job at a local bar owned by Ben, a lonely widower, and soon realized Ben was actually her Internet soul mate. The two began to fall in love, but things didn't go as smoothly when Ben's neighbor Annie Douglas (Sarah Buxton) decided she wanted Ben for herself, and was prepared to stop at nothing to achieve that. Meg also learned that her ex-fiancé Tim had followed her to Sunset Beach, though she had no idea that he was helping Annie to damage her relationship with Ben.

In one of their crazy attempts to break the couple, Annie and Tim lured Meg to a cave that later collapsed, without realizing that Ben had followed her. The couple had sex for the first time, but Meg had no idea Ben was delirious, thinking that he was having sex with his late wife Maria. Annie's plot revealed that Ben had no memory of having sex with Meg, and a hurt Meg decided to return to Kansas. Ben refused to give up and he followed Meg, convincing her to return. Annie's scheming continued throughout the series.

While spending the holidays on a private island, Meg and her friends were attacked by a mysterious murderer. The murderer was revealed to be Ben, but once the terror was over, it turned out that Ben was being impersonated by his twin brother Derek Evans (Clive Robertson), who was holding Ben captive in an abandoned warehouse. Meg had no idea she was being scammed until she found a picture of Ben and Derek together. After a final showdown, Derek was presumed dead, and Meg and Ben resumed their happiness and started planning their wedding. However their happiness was short-lived, as Ben's presumed-dead wife Maria arrived at their wedding - alive, but suffering from amnesia.

"Meg, the suffering virgin, is in her early 20s. This is the Juliet role. Her primary function is to cry. She sleeps only with her intended. She has true friends and true love, but everything conspires to keep her from the bliss we want her to have. For example, her recent wedding ceremony was interrupted by the arrival of her new husband's presumably dead wife, a victim of five years of amnesia. Only Meg has two "normal" parents, who have trivial roles."

— The Journal of Sex Research on Meg. (1999)

Ben struggled to decide between the two women he loved, a situation complicated when a strange woman, Tess Marin (Tracy Melchior), claiming to have been Maria's close friend during the years she could not remember, arrived with a child, Benjy, she claimed was Ben and Maria's son. DNA testing confirmed that Benjy was Ben's son, and for a time Ben, Meg, Maria, Tess and Benjy all lived under one roof. Meg eventually broke up with Ben, and found comfort in her close friend Casey, who had recently broken up with her sister Sara. Meg and Casey eventually broke up, realizing that they were better off as friends. Ben then started acting strangely, committing to Maria and their son yet chasing Meg at the same time. However it was revealed that Ben had once again been kidnapped by Derek, and that Benjy was Derek and Tess's son, conceived as part of a plan to murder Ben and Maria and have Benjy inherit his money. Tim discovered Derek's identity, and was murdered by Derek. Maria was the second to discover Derek's identity, leading to Derek imprisoning her with Ben. During their imprisonment, they talked and Maria realized and accepted that Meg was Ben's true love. Next, Casey and Sara discovered Derek, and were duly also taken prisoner. Finally Maria's mother Carmen asked Meg for help, leading to her searching Ben's house and also discovering Derek's identity. Meg attempted to overpower Derek by pretending to seduce him in order to grab his gun, but soon found herself prisoner too. With Ben's help, Maria managed to escape and overpower Tess, leading to a mass fight between the two captors and five prisoners, which resulted in Derek being shot and killed. Tess was jailed, and Maria decided to adopt Benjy, the child she regarded as her own son. The series culminated with a romantic double wedding between Ben and Meg, and their friends Vanessa Hart (Sherri Saum) and Michael Bourne (Jason Winston George). In the final episode, Meg awoke from a dream to realize that she was still in Kansas and that her life in Sunset Beach was all a dream - then awoke in bed with Ben in Sunset Beach, and realized that that was a dream, and her life in Sunset Beach with Ben was reality.

== Reception ==
In 1998, Meg and Ben were nominated in the category of "Best Couple" at the Soap Opera Digest Awards. Michael Saunders of The Boston Globe said that if you watched the serial, you just watched "the adventures of Meg Cummings, the headstrong lass who left Kansas for Sunset Beach." Candace Havens of the Kingman Daily Miner opined that the character set the "tone and pace" of Sunset Beach. In 2011, Bibsy M. Carballo of The Philippine Star said the growing trend of destroying wedding dresses against tradition in the Philippines, originated from Meg destroying her dress. The Daily Record said that Meg's final dream sequence was "possibly the best" ever one featured in the soap, adding that it was unmissable. While Merle Brown from the publication said the love triangle storyline with Meg, Ben and Maria lasted for too long. As Sunset Beach made no "excuses" about the duration of the storyline, Brown said it was one of the serial's qualities.

Darrin Farrant of The Age said that Meg seemed like a "naive" character. He added that "poor Meg" had no idea Ben was her internet lover and opined that because the Sunset Beach story pace seemed slow it would probably "unfold over many episodes". His Age colleague, Simon Hughes, said that Meg was a "country mouse" in comparison to her "city cousin", Tiffany Thorne (Adrienne Frantz). He opined that Meg's "inarticulateness" was part of her charm.
