= Annie Douglas Richards =

Fictional character from the TV series Sunset Beach

Annie Richards
- Sunset Beach character
- Portrayed by: Sarah Buxton
- Duration: 1997–99
- First appearance: January 6, 1997
- Last appearance: December 31, 1999
- Created by: Robert Guza, Jr.
- Introduced by: Gary Tomlin, Aaron Spelling and E. Duke Vincent
In-universe information
- Other names: Anna Claire Douglas
- Occupation: Personal assistant; Waitress; Shareholder in Liberty Corporation
- Father: Del Douglas
- Mother: Madeleine Douglas
- Husband: Gregory Richards (1998–99)
- Aunts: Bette Katzenkazrahi
- First cousins: Emily Davis

Annie Richards (also Douglas) is a fictional character from the American television soap opera Sunset Beach, played by Sarah Buxton. She made her first appearance during the episode broadcast on January 6, 1997. The character's creation was announced in 1996 prior to the soap's debut. Series creator Aaron Spelling helped create Annie's appearance and style. Annie has been characterised as a reformed girl. The character has also been central to various fantasy sequences through her duration. These have been favoured by some of the soap opera's critics. Buxton has been nominated for one award for her portrayal and Annie has been branded one of the programme's most popular characters.

== Development ==
Sarah Buxton's casting was announced in October 1996, prior to Sunset Beach debuting on air. Annie was billed as a "sexy and spoiled resident of a local beach house." The programme's creator Aaron Spelling was unhappy with the style choices for Annie that the serial's production made. Spelling decided to choose Annie's style because he felt skirts, boots and low hanging necklaces fitted the character's image. He also wanted Annie to have red hair, but was unhappy with the selection of wigs made available at the beginning of the series. He managed to convince Buxton to dye her hair from dark brown to red.

Annie is characterised as a "top heavy scheming vixen" with light morals and portrays the image of a "poor little rich girl". Annie is known for her involvement in various fantasy sequences during her tenure. The serial hired Gary Owens to do a voice over during one of Annie's fantasies. While comedian Howie Mandel and television host Jerry Springer were signed up to appear in Annie's game show fantasy.

== Storylines ==
Annie was always a feisty woman. Most would say she was the best heroine on "Sunset Beach". From the first day, Annie was plotting her way to win the affections of Ben Evans (Clive Robertson), spending all her father's money and skipping college. After her father Del Douglas (John Reilly) was murdered, Annie was one of the suspects and eventually all evidence pointed at Annie, so she ran away trying to fight for her innocence. She stayed at the home of her aunt Bette Katzenkazrahi (Kathleen Noone). During that time, Annie always seemed to be plotting something. Her main enemy was Meg Cummings (Susan Ward), a woman who came to Sunset Beach from Kansas and eventually hooked up with her Internet lover Ben Evans.

While trying to escape from the police, Annie found herself trapped in a coffin that was sent to the crematorium. At the time, she was presumed dead, but a few days later she reappeared at Ben's place, where she had been hiding for some time. After her father's murderer was found, Annie didn't spare time. She continued plotting against Meg, trying to get Ben to herself, and she teamed up with Tim Truman (Dax Griffin), Meg's ex-fiancé, to break them up. Every now and then, their plan worked, but eventually Meg and Ben hooked up again. She also sometimes used Eddie Connors (Peter Barton) to help her get what she wants.

Then all of a sudden, Annie was involved into a different storyline. After giving up on Ben for good, Annie learned that she had to marry Gregory Richards (Sam Behrens) by the end of June 1998 in order to get her father's inheritance. Her father has been having an affair with Gregory's wife, and forcing Annie to try to break up their marriage was his revenge. Annie's opportunity came when she was asked by Gregory's daughter Caitlin Richards (Vanessa Dorman) to help her find a baby to introduce as her own. Annie found the best way to use this in her new plot. She took a newborn baby from yet main nemesis, Olivia Richards (Lesley-Anne Down), Gregory's ex-wife and Caitlin's mother. Annie gave the child to Caitlin (who was unaware that the child was her brother), and then told Olivia that her baby was born dead. Never missing out on a chance to plot, Annie came to a sudden revelation that Ben's ex-wife Maria Torres (Christina Chambers) was actually alive, and she plotted with Tim again to break up Ben and Meg.

In a few months, Annie plotted her way into marrying Gregory by comforting him over the 'death' of his son and convincing him that Olivia had been drunk during the birth. She then continued trying to fight everything that she had done. Her plots were usually discovered in a while and she found herself trapped. She was always trying to get her father's money. She made it look like Olivia had been drinking by using potions of a Voodoo Priestess, Mrs. Moreau, who was often used by other characters; and that is how her baby died. Even though she was involved in her own storyline, Annie never missed a chance to fight with Meg. After her husband was presumed dead, Annie found love in Jude Cavanaugh (Sean Kanan), an undercover cop. During the time, she tried to get as much money from Gregory's will as she could. At the very end, she slowed down, made peace with Olivia and Meg, and settled down with Jude.

== Reception ==
"The young slut. Annie is 25 years old and sleeps with everyone on the show who has something she wants. She is rich, manipulative and amoral. Deep down, Annie is only looking for true friendship and love, neither of which favor her. Without Annie's shenanigans there would be very little to see or do in Sunset Beach."

— The Journal of Sex Research on Annie. (1999)

For her portrayal of Annie, Buxton was nominated in the category of "Outstanding heroine" at the 1998 Soap Opera Digest Awards. Justine Elias of The New York Times said Buxton and Anne Down showed signs of "becoming a classic matchup of battling soap opera vixens" in the respective roles of Annie and Olivia. Henry Mietkiewicz of the Toronto Star said that Annie "crowed gracelessly" during her scenes and opined that Buxton had a tendency to "shrilly overplay" Annie. A writer for the Fort Worth Star-Telegram opined that Annie often "stirs up a lot of trouble" in the serial. Ken Tucker of Entertainment Weekly said Annie was as every bit "hootable" as Olivia, but more "bratty and greedy".

Julia Shih of The Michigan Daily criticised Sunset Beach for its slow-paced episodes, opining that Annie's arrest should have been over in a few minutes rather than taking up an entire episode. She added it made the episode halt to a "sleep-inducing state". The Boston Herald included Annie's various fights with Meg in their feature on the most memorable soap opera moments during 1997. Their writer Mark A. Perigard said the fights represented a growing trend of "female violence" during the previous year. On Annie's game show fantasy, Liz Smith of the Toledo Blade said "Fans know that only Sarah Buxton a.k.a Sunset sexpot Annie Douglas, could have such a dream!" Seli Groves of The Dispatch opined that Sunset Beach were using Annie's fantasies of Jerry Springer solely in a bid to gain ratings. While Merle Brown of the Daily Record, said "Annie is having one of those brilliant fantasy sequences and it's a corker. She's a contestant on a bizarre game show [...] Brilliant, just brilliant." In the 2008 book "Stinkin Thinkin", M.J. Gunn said that Annie's dream sequences were some of the best scenes to watch on Sunset Beach. In South African magazine Drum, Annie was described as having "evil designs of her own" and becoming one of the serial's most popular characters. Simon Hughes of The Age said that Meg faced "stiff competition" in the form of Annie, for Ben's affections. He also opined that she was "the very sort of liberated femme to spice her small talk with salty entendres". A reporter from All About Soap branded Annie's premonitions of hell, in which she speaks to the show's dead villains as one of the show's "classic moments". They added that "Annie was our favourite flame-haired villainess."
