= Antonio Torres (Sunset Beach) =

- Sunset Beach character
- Portrayed by: Nick Kiriazis
- Duration: 1998–1999
- First appearance: February 6, 1998
- Last appearance: December 31, 1999
- Created by: Meg Bennett and Christopher Whitesell
- Introduced by: Gary Tomlin, Aaron Spelling and E. Duke Vincent
In-universe information
- Occupation: Roman Catholic Priest
- Mother: Carmen Torres
- Brothers: Ricardo Torres
- Sisters: Maria Torres Evans

Father Antonio Torres is a fictional character from the American television soap opera Sunset Beach, played by Nick Kiriazis. He made his first screen appearance during the episode broadcast on February 6, 1998 and remained with the soap until its final episode, which was broadcast on December 31, 1999.

== Development ==
Kiriazis's casting was publicized on January 16, 1998. He was introduced as established character Ricardo Torres's (Hank Cheyne) younger brother. Kiriazis made his debut appearance on February 6.

== Storylines ==
Antonio, brother of Ricardo Torres, came to Sunset Beach early in 1998 when he got transferred to work back home. His brother had just started a relationship with Gabi Martinez, and their mother Carmen did not approve of their relationship. Then Gabi met Antonio. Gabi and Antonio found themselves attracted to each other, but they kept denying the attraction. Ricardo and Gabi got engaged. Meanwhile, both Gabi, Antonio and Ricardo were involved in a Rosario jewels story. When Gabi and Antonio ended up trapped in an exploding building, they thought they would die, so they slept together, and a camera filmed them. The tape of their lovemaking was later used by Francesca Vargas to blackmail Antonio and Gabi.

When Francesca was murdered, Gabi and Antonio were possible suspects, but they actually didn't have anything to do with her murder. At Gabi and Ricardo's wedding, Carmen used the tape of their lovemaking to blackmail Gabi into leaving Ricardo at the altar, but they eventually got married and everything was going fine until Ricardo found the tape and decided to destroy Gabi and Antonio's life. Antonio and Gabi decided to forget about everything that happened between them, but Ricardo was there to ruin it. He spent months trying to ruin Antonio's life by calling an archbishop to take away Antonio, but eventually, the truth came out, the brothers came to forgive each other for everything they've done, and Gabi left town.

== Reception ==
In January 1999, some fans of the show criticized the Antonio/Gabi storyline believing it was "upsetting" to Catholic viewers. Soap critic Sally Stone reported that the fans were "tired of shows that try to incite interest by showing priests or nuns being tempted in erotic situations."

A critic from Inside Soap noted that Antonio's shirt sleeves were short enough to show his "impressive" biceps, adding "none of the priests round our way look like that..." In 2012, Kate White from the same publication named Antonio as one of her favourite soap opera characters of the last 20 years. She stated "No list would be complete for me without a face from my favourite soap ever, Sunset Beach. I'm going for Father Antonio because he manages to encompass many of the things I love about the show. Father Antonio was the worst priest of all time. When he wasn't blaspheming in scenes where he got busy talking to himself, he was sleeping with his brother Ricardo's girlfriend Gabi and accidentally taping it." White added that Kiriazis was "stunningly gorgeous", which is why fans of Sunset Beach called him "Father Fit."
