= Cole Deschanel =

- Sunset Beach character
- Eddie Cibrian as Cole (1997)
- Portrayed by: Ashley Hamilton (1997); Eddie Cibrian (1997–1999)
- Duration: 1997–1999
- First appearance: January 21, 1997
- Last appearance: December 31, 1999
- Created by: Robert Guza, Jr.
- Introduced by: Gary Tomlin, Aaron Spelling and E. Duke Vincent
- Ashley Hamilton as Cole (1997)
In-universe information
- Other names: Cole St. John; John Robie
- Occupation: Infamous jewel thief; Construction worker; Liberty Corporation employee
- Father: A.J. Deschanel
- Mother: Elaine Stevens
- Brothers: Leo Deschanel
- Sisters: Paula Stevens (Half)
- Wife: Caitlin Deschanel (1998–present)
- Sons: Trey Deschanel
- Grandfathers: Armando Deschanel
- Grandmothers: Julianna Deschanel

Cole Deschanel is a fictional character from the US television soap opera Sunset Beach. Ashley Hamilton played the role of Cole from his introduction on January 21, 1997 to February 19, 1997. The producers decided Eddie Cibrian would fit the role better and the actor took over on February 21, 1997. Cibrian departed on October 14, 1999, to pursue a career in primetime. He made a guest appearance for the series finale on December 31, 1999.

== Development ==
Hamilton originated the role of Cole St. John. He made his first on-screen appearance a week after the show debuted. A few weeks after his first episodes aired, Hamilton's departure was announced on February 11, 1997. The role was recast to Eddie Cibrian, who was also appearing in Baywatch Nights at the time. Hamilton said his departure was by mutual decision based on the "evolution of the character from the way it was initially conceived." Cibrian made his debut as Cole on February 21, 1997.

In an April 1999 interview with Annette Dasey of Inside Soap, Cibrian called Cole a "dream part". He said: "I crave action and adventure, so it's great as there's nothing in the world Cole can't do. Every week I read my scripts and know I'm going to love working through them. I just hope he never slows down." Dasey described Cole as evil and said he had committed "many dastardly deeds" during his time in Sunset Beach. PR Newswire said Cole was a "handsome jewel thief and grandson of town founder Armando Deschanel."

== Storylines ==
Cole St. John was a man of mystery. He entered Sunset Beach looking for jewels that he was supposed to steal, and he had no idea what would happen to him once he arrived. A young woman named Caitlin Richards fell in love with him, and their love was constantly threatened by Caitlin's over-protective and sinister father Gregory Richards. At the same time, Cole slept with Olivia Richards, but he didn't know that Olivia was actually Caitlin's mother. Also, Cole was shocked when he realized that his stepmother Elaine Stevens was in town, and he learned the entire truth about his origin. He was also shocked when he found that Caitlin was Olivia's daughter.

Various times, Gregory tried to get rid of Cole, even by hiring a hit man to kill him, but he didn't succeed. Thing got even more complicated. At the same time, both Caitlin and Olivia got pregnant. After a car accident, Caitlin lost her baby, but she decided to keep pretending to be pregnant, so she wouldn't lose Cole. Meanwhile, Olivia finally found happiness again with AJ. Caitlin sought help from Annie Douglas to find a baby that Caitlin could use as her own. At the same time, Annie plotted to win over Gregory, so she decided to make a huge turn-over. When Olivia gave birth, Annie stole the baby and gave it to Caitlin. Olivia thought her baby had died, and Caitlin had no idea that she had her mother's child. This caused Gregory and Olivia's divorce.

Caitlin and Cole were finally happy. They had a baby and they got married. It seemed like everything was perfect. In the summer of 1998, Cole and Caitlin were also involved in the tsunami storyline. Cole met his former lover and his fellow jewel thief partner Francesca Vargas, and Francesca tried to win him over, but he only loved Caitlin. When Francesca was murdered, they were also suspects, but none of them murdered her, But actually, Gregory's the one who killed Francesca. Olivia was shocked to find out that Caitlin's baby is actually her own. Caitlin had hard time dealing with the truth, and this caused a big fight between Cole and Caitlin. The next thing that Cole had to deal with was if the child was his. Caitlin and Gregory were shocked to learn that Olivia and Cole had an affair years ago. It was then revealed that Cole is actually Trey's father. This led to a fight between Gregory and Cole, after which Gregory went missing and everyone presumed him dead. In October, Cole was caught by London authorities and went missing. He eventually returned to Sunset Beach in the final episode, and reunited with his one and only love, Caitlin.

== Reception ==
Five months after his debut as Cole, Cibrian was named one of "Daytime's 12 Hottest Stars" by TV Guide. The actor received a nomination for Outstanding Younger Lead Actor at the 14th Soap Opera Digest Awards in 1998. The following year, Cibrian was nominated in the Hottest Male Star category.
