= List of Sunset Beach characters =

Cast circa 1998 First Row: Antonio, Maria, Ben, Meg, Annie, Gregory, Olivia, Michael, Vanessa Second Row: Francesca, Ricardo, Gabi, Leo, A.J., Bette, Emily, Sean, Caitlin, Cole Third Row: Tyus, Amy, Brad, Jimmy, Virginia, Casey, Sara, Hank, Joan, Tim

The following are characters from the American soap opera Sunset Beach, which aired on NBC from January 6, 1997 to December 31, 1999.

== Original cast members ==
=== Ricardo Torres ===
Ricardo Torres
- Sunset Beach character
- Portrayed by: Hank Cheyne
- Duration: 1997–1999
- First appearance: January 6, 1997
- Last appearance: December 31, 1999
- Created by: Robert Guza, Jr.
- Introduced by: Gary Tomlin, Aaron Spelling and E. Duke Vincent
In-universe information
- Occupation: Detective
- Mother: Carmen Torres
- Siblings: Maria Torres; Antonio Torres
- Spouse: Gabi Martinez (1999)

- played by Hank Cheyne

Ricardo Torres had just been promoted to a detective. He's leading a great life with Paula Stevens, his girlfriend, and it seems like everything is going fine. Eddie Connors, Paula and Ricardo's fellow officer, always wanted Paula for himself. When Paula accidentally saw him in a jewelry store, he thought she was on to him, so he decided to teach her a lesson by kidnapping her and then paying Ralph Myers, a criminal, to torture her. Ricardo went through hard time trying to find his fiancée. She was barely saved from a van filled with gas. The next few weeks she spent trying to deal with the rape and putting Ralph behind bars.

During her kidnapping, Ricardo met Gabi Martinez, an attractive woman who spent a night with Ricardo and then later it turned out that Gabi was Paula's sister. Gabi moved in with Paula and Ricardo and did her best to mess with Ricardo's mind. When Paula and Ricardo broke up, Ricardo slept with Gabi, and Gabi was confused after they had sex and eventually accused Ricardo of raping her. For Paula, it was something that she just could not get through. Although it was proven that Ricardo was innocent, Paula decided to leave town by the end of 1997.

In 1998, Ricardo became closer with Gabi, as they realized that they loved each other. However, Gabi soon fell in love with Ricardo's brother Antonio, but they both rejected their attraction. Meanwhile, Ricardo's mother Carmen constantly tried to warn Ricardo to leave Gabi. During the Shockwave storyline, Ricardo found himself on the boat along with other Sunset Beach people. The boat suffered the same tragedy as Titanic, but the people rescued themselves just in time. Months later, Ricardo was involved in two other storylines---his sister Maria returned home after being presumed dead in 1993, and he often confronted Maria's husband Ben about it. He was also involved in a Rosario Jewels storyline.

In 1999, Ricardo was convinced that everything was going fine. Gabi and him decided to get married, but he did not know that Gabi slept with his brother when they found themselves trapped in an exploded building. Carmen blackmailed Gabi to stop the wedding, but Gabi and Ricardo eventually got married. Days later, Ricardo was shocked to find a tape of Gabi and Antonio together. The shock of this overwhelmed him. He suffered a stroke and was hospitalized, after which he did everything he could to make Gabi's life a disaster. He also tried to deport his brother Antonio. Eventually, Ricardo forgave them both, and Gabi left town at the very last episode.

=== Paula Stevens ===
- played by Laura Harring (January 6, 1997―December 17, 1997)

Paula Stevens, a beautiful and intelligent police officer, was leading her normal life and everything was going fine. She just got engaged to Ricardo Torres, a fellow police officer, but there was something that was about to ruin everything. Her mother Elaine turned out to be the murderer of Del Douglas.

When she went through a few pre-marriage problems, Eddie Connors tried to seduce her, but she rejected him, so he decided to teach her a lesson by paying Ralph, a criminal, to kidnap and rape her. Ricardo went through hard time trying to find his fiancé. She was barely saved from a van filled with gas. The next few weeks she spent trying to deal with the rape and putting Ralph behind bars. However, that was not the only thing that was bothering her.

During her kidnapping, Ricardo met Gabi Martinez, an attractive woman who spent a night with Ricardo and then later it turned out that Gabi was Paula's sister. Gabi, who slept with Ricardo, was confused after they had sex and eventually accused Ricardo of raping her. For Paula, it was something that she just could not get through. Although it was proven that Ricardo was innocent, Paula decided to leave town by the end of 1997.

=== Gabi Martinez ===
Gabi Martinez
- Sunset Beach character
- Portrayed by: Priscilla Garita
- Duration: 1997–99
- First appearance: February 17, 1997
- Last appearance: December 31, 1999
- Created by: Robert Guza, Jr.
- Introduced by: Gary Tomlin, Aaron Spelling and E. Duke Vincent
In-universe information
- Other names: Gabriella Martinez; Gabi Torres; Gabi Martinez-Torres
- Occupation: Police Department File Clerk
- Parents: Anestina Gonzalez Martinez; Lorenzo Martinez
- Siblings: Paula Stevens
- Spouse: Ricardo Torres (July—December 1999)

- played by Priscilla Garita (February 17, 1997―December 31, 1999)

Although her first appearance is one month after the show's premiere, Priscilla receives cast credit from the show's beginning. When she started on Sunset Beach, Gabi immediately starts to seduce Ricardo Torres, an engaged Police officer, and she continues flirting with him. Days later, Gabi finds out that Ricardo's fiancé was Paula Stevens, her half-sister. Gabi is well received by her half-sister, but Ricardo did not have the same attitude. Paula offered Gabi to stay with them in the apartment, where she continues to seduce Ricardo. Things got complicated when Ricardo and Gabi slept together, and Gabi accuses Ricardo of raping her, which leads to court. Paula is convinced that Gabi was telling the truth and she leaves Ricardo. Although Ricardo proves that he did not rape Gabi, Paula decides to leave town with her mother.

On her way to redemption, she realizes having been raped by her father troubles her, Gabi decides to spend New Year's Eve on a mysterious island bought by Ben Evans for Meg Cummings, but a killer was present on the island. She survives. At the time, Gabi was becoming closer with Mark Wolper, a young D.J., but they never got a chance to develop their relationship because Mark is killed off during that storyline.

In 1998, Gabi and Ricardo got closer although Ricardo's mother Carmen Torres did not approve their relationship. Then Gabi met Antonio Torres, Ricardo's brother, a priest. Gabi and Antonio found themselves attracted to each other, but they kept denying the attraction. Antonio and Gabi were in love with each other. Ricardo and Gabi get engaged. Meanwhile, both Gabi, Antonio and Ricardo is involved in a Rosario jewels story. When Gabi and Antonio ends up trapped in an exploding building, they thought they would die and so they gave in to their love for each other and they slept together, and a camera filmed them. The tape of their sexual intercourse was later used by Francesca Vargas to blackmail Antonio and Gabi. When Francesca was killed, Gabi and Antonio were possible suspects, but they actually did not have anything to do with her murder. At Gabi and Ricardo's wedding, Carmen uses the tape of their lovemaking to blackmail Gabi into leaving Ricardo at the altar, but they eventually marry and everything was going fine until Ricardo found the tape and decided to destroy Gabi and Antonio's life. Eventually, Ricardo forgives them and Gabi decides to leave town and find good stuff somewhere else, giving up on her true love Antonio.

=== Casey Mitchum ===
Casey Mitchum
- Sunset Beach character
- Portrayed by: Timothy Adams
- Duration: 1997–99
- First appearance: January 6, 1997
- Last appearance: December 31, 1999
- Created by: Robert Guza, Jr.
- Introduced by: Gary Tomlin, Aaron Spelling and E. Duke Vincent
In-universe information
- Occupation: Lifeguard
- Parents: John Mitchum; Alex Mitchum

- played by Timothy Adams

At the very beginning of the show, Casey met Rae Chang, a young doctor who immediately took his breath away, but she did not show the same interest in Casey. They both decided to buy a house and accidentally bought the same house. When Rae was forced to marry a young man named Wei-Li that her parents chose for her, Casey helped Rae by pretending to be her husband. This led to something of a mild rivalry between Casey and Wei-Li when he arrived in Sunset Beach to see Rae, but it never grew into anything serious as the two men actually liked each other. Their plot was eventually revealed, and Rae discovered she did have feelings for Wei-Li after all.

(About Rae and Casey) It was over before he got a chance to show his softer side. They were both so hard-headed, it was hard for him to act smooth and confident. And that's who I think Casey is.

— Timothy Adams

Casey was heartbroken, but his life had to go on. Alex Mitchum, his mother, came to Sunset Beach with an illness, but she decided to hide it from her son, yet the truth was soon discovered. Casey spent the next few months taking care of her. Until the end of 1997, Casey spent time taking care of his friends, putting his love life away. He was also one of the survivors of the Terror Island storyline.

In 1998, Casey met Sara Cummings, Meg's sister, and they soon fell in love with each other. Casey helped Sara escape from her past, and she was happy to be rescued by such a handsome person. They both battled against Sara's ex-friend Melinda Fall. They became even closer. At the same time, Meg was having trouble with Ben, whose wife had just returned from the dead. Sara was afraid that Casey's friendship with Meg could turn into something more, so she worked with Tim Truman to break them up. Sara was very insecure, and eventually Casey found out about Sara's plot and broke up with Sara. Then Casey consoled Meg and they ended up in a short relationship, but their love was never more than on a friendly basis. Sara and Casey go together at the end of the series.

=== Rae Chang ===
- played by Kelly Hu (January 7, 1997―June 5, 1997)

Dr. Rae Chang was introduced in the second episode as a physician, a young doctor. Rae decided to buy a house called Surf Central, and ended up buying it with Casey Mitchum, a young lifeguard. They quickly fell in love, but Rae always put her feelings aside. Meanwhile, she felt pressured by her parents to marry a man they chose for her, Wei-Li Young. Rae pretended to be married to Casey in front of her parents, but eventually gave in to her parents' pressure and left town and married Wei-Lee. Her character was written off only a few months after the premiere.

=== Elaine Stevens ===
- played by Leigh Taylor-Young (January 6, 1997―December 17, 1997)

Elaine Stevens, a fun and entertaining person, is commonly regarded as one of the town's most popular denizens. Though Elaine earned the town's respect by owning and operating her own coffee shop, she recurrently struggled with the fact that her daughter Paula chose to marry Ricardo Torres. Her troubled past came back to haunt her when she realized that her best friends Olivia Richards and Bette Katzenkazrahi assisted Del Douglas in kidnapping her baby Cole Deschanel when Elaine was younger.

After Cole came to town in 1997, Elaine dug up his grave and found that it was empty. This exacerbated the anger Elaine felt at her friends' betrayal. It was later revealed that Elaine murdered Del Douglas, but fortunately Gregory Richards saved her in court. By the end of 1997, Elaine left town with her daughter. Her departure was never addressed or depicted on-screen.

=== Eddie Connors ===
- played by Peter Barton (January 6, 1997―May 18, 1998, March 19, 1999)

Eddie Connors, a police officer, was presented to us as Annie Douglas' boy-toy. He served her when she wanted, and usually tried to do whatever she needed. Eddie had a crush on his fellow female officer Paula Stevens, but she was not interested. Eddie accidentally saw Paula in a jewelry store, where he was trying to sell Deschanel jewels and win a fortune. He thought Paula suspected him, so he kidnapped her and then hired a rapist to take care of her. Paula's fiancé Ricardo Torres found her, and he had no idea that Eddie was behind the kidnapping. Eddie was also the first person to learn that Cole Deschanel was Elaine Stevens' son.

Eddie left the police force and became a private investigator. In May 1998, he discovered Derek Evans was impersonating his twin Ben Evans and decided to try to blackmail him, leading to Derek murdering him. On March 19, 1999, Eddie returned in one episode along with Del Douglas to greet Francesca Vargas in Hell.

=== Michael Bourne ===
Michael Bourne
- Sunset Beach character
- Portrayed by: Jason Winston George
- Duration: 1997–99
- First appearance: January 6, 1997
- Last appearance: December 31, 1999
- Created by: Robert Guza, Jr.
- Introduced by: Gary Tomlin, Aaron Spelling and E. Duke Vincent
In-universe information
- Occupation: Lifeguard
- Spouse: Vanessa Hart (wed on December 31, 1999)

Michael Bourne was played by Jason Winston George

Michael was a town lifeguard, who had Casey Mitchum as a friend and many others. His story began when he met a young journalist Vanessa Hart and saved her from a sure death. Vanessa had a lot of trouble due to an article she was writing, trying to save LaShawnda and Jaleen Muhammad from Jo-Jo Muhammad, who turned out to be Michael's friend. Vanessa found herself hiding from them, and Michael was always there to save her. When the situation had resolved itself, Vanessa decided to leave to Hong Kong. Michael was sad about it. Days later, Vanessa returned home, but a chance for love with Michael was a bit challenged. Michael's friend from past, Virginia Harrison, was in love with Michael and she often used her son Jimmy Harrison to get what she wanted. Virginia did everything she could to break up the happy couple. It was later revealed that Michael had accidentally murdered Virginia's husband.

During the Terror Island storyline, Virginia tried to kill Vanessa several times, but she did not do it, because they had to worry about the serial killer on the loose. Virginia researched Vanessa's past and realized that Vanessa had a mother that suffered from Martin's Syndrome, and she decided to use it to her advantage. She used help from Mrs. Moreau to get a potion that could make Vanessa think she got the syndrome too. Vanessa was frightened and decided to leave Sunset Beach to avoid Michael. Michael was in despair when Vanessa left. Meanwhile, Vanessa was hiding at Tyus Robinson's place. Tyus fell in love with Vanessa, but she did not have the same feelings for him. Tyus was working on a cure for Vanessa, and everyone was surprised when Vanessa's illness disappeared. Vanessa and Michael finally reunited, but their happiness did not last long. Virginia made another plot, a sick and crazy plan.

On the night of Meg Cummings and Ben Evans' wedding, Virginia used a turkey baster to insert Tyus' sperm (which she stole) into Vanessa and impregnated her. Vanessa soon learned she was pregnant. Virginia also staged another scene. She took a photo of Vanessa and Tyus together on the bed, and therefore, they thought that they had sex. Michael soon learned the truth about Vanessa's pregnancy and he was definitely shocked. Vanessa and Michael broke up, and Tyus comforted Vanessa. A few weeks later, Vanessa miscarried. When it seemed like Vanessa and Michael were coming closer again, Virginia had finally lost it. She ended up in a mental institution, and she confessed all of her crimes. Vanessa and Michael were both shocked. A few months later, after making up and breaking up, on the final episode, Vanessa and Michael finally got married.

Michael and Vanessa's storyline was often isolated from other characters, focusing mainly on either the two of them or Virginia, but not branching out the storyline to mix with others. Sunset Beach's final episode, which aired on December 31, 1999, featured the double wedding of Michael and Vanessa alongside Meg and Ben.

I'm mixed on it. On the one hand, I'm glad that the story represents the good, the bad and the ugly. For a while, African Americans always showed up as thugs, and then for a while, they only showed up as perfectly good people who do no wrong. And now, we have representation across the board. That's cool. But at the same time, we lost any interaction with anybody else on the show. But that's changing, and I'm happy about it because I think the interaction needs to be there.

— Jason George (about story isolation)

=== Vanessa Hart ===
Vanessa Hart
- Sunset Beach character
- Portrayed by: Sherri Saum
- Duration: 1997–99
- First appearance: January 9, 1997
- Last appearance: December 31, 1999
- Created by: Robert Guza, Jr.
- Introduced by: Gary Tomlin, Aaron Spelling and E. Duke Vincent
In-universe information
- Occupation: Journalist at Sunset Beach Sentinel
- Parents: Lena Hart; Robert Hart
- Spouse: Michael Bourne (wed on December 31, 1999)

- played by Sherri Saum

A young journalist named Vanessa entered the world of Sunset Beach when Michael Bourne saved her from death, and then later saved her from a robber. Vanessa had a lot of trouble due to an article she was writing, trying to save RaShonda and Jaleen Muhammad from Jo-Jo Muhammad, who turned out to be Michael's friend. Vanessa found herself hiding from them, and Michael was always there to save her. When the situation had resolved itself, Vanessa decided to leave to Hong Kong briefly, but promised to keep their love alive. Days later, Vanessa returned home, but a chance for love with Michael was a bit challenged. Michael's friend from past, Virginia Harrison, was in love with Michael and she often used her son Jimmy Harrison to get what she wanted. Virginia did everything she could to break up the happy couple. It was later revealed that Michael had accidentally murdered Virginia's husband.

It came to Vanessa's attention that Virginia was more than meets the eye. She was trying to get attention, and Vanessa did not like it. When Vanessa and Michael left for a romantic weekend getaway in a cabin, Virginia drove to the cabin and set it on fire. Vanessa later realized that Virginia was the one who did it, but Michael did not believe her. Virginia was jealous because Vanessa started snooping into her life. Virginia researched Vanessa's past and realized that Vanessa had a mother that suffered from Martin's Syndrome, and she decided to use it to her advantage.

She used help from Mrs. Moreau to get a potion that could make Vanessa think she got the syndrome too. Vanessa was frightened and decided to leave Sunset Beach to avoid Michael. Michael was in despair when Vanessa left. Meanwhile, Vanessa was hiding at Tyus Robinson's place. Tyus fell in love with Vanessa, but she did not have the same feelings for him. Tyus was working on a cure for Vanessa, and everyone was surprised when Vanessa's illness disappeared. Vanessa and Michael finally reunited, but their happiness did not last long. Virginia made another plot, a sick and crazy plan.

On the night of Meg Cummings' and Ben Evans' wedding, Virginia used a turkey baster to insert Tyus' sperm (which she stole) into Vanessa and impregnated her. Vanessa soon learned she was pregnant. Virginia also staged another scene. She took a photo of Vanessa and Tyus together on the bed, and therefore, they thought that they had sex. Michael soon learned the truth about Vanessa's pregnancy and he was happy it until he learned that Tyus might be the father.

I've been having nightmares about being pregnant for real. Because every day that I'm saying, "I'm pregnant, I'm pregnant," it's transferring into my dreams. I'm not ready for that. I love babies; just don't let them come from my womb and I am a happy camper.

— Sherri Saum

Vanessa and Michael broke up, and Tyus comforted Vanessa. A few weeks later, Vanessa miscarried. When it seemed like Vanessa and Michael were coming closer again, Virginia had finally lost it. She ended up in a mental institution, as she confessed all of her crimes. Michael then tried to propose to Vanessa, A few months later, after making up and breaking up, on the final episode, Vanessa and Michael finally got married.

=== Ben Evans ===
Ben Evans
- Sunset Beach character
- Portrayed by: Clive Robertson
- First appearance: January 6, 1997
- Last appearance: December 31, 1999
- Created by: Robert Guza, Jr.
In-universe information
- Occupation: Entrepreneur; One-quarter shareholder in the Liberty Corporation
- Siblings: Derek Evans †; Ted Evans
- Spouse: Maria Torres (1993―)
- Children: Benjy Evans

- played by Clive Robertson

Ben Evans is a mercurial recluse who lost his wife years ago. He's spending his days running a business in Sunset Beach, and chatting on the net with a mysterious woman named Dorothy. His neighbor, Annie Douglas Richards is a spoiled woman who is trying to seduce him. That's how begins the story of Ben Evans. Days later, Ben meets Meg Cummings, and gives her a job at The Deep. Meg and Ben start to fall in love, but their happiness was limited by Annie, who stopped at nothing to achieve what she wanted. Annie always plotted to break up the two lovebirds, and she used Meg's ex-fiancé Tim to help her get what she wanted. It was also revealed that Ben's mysterious Dorothy was actually Meg. Annie planted bloody sheets, forged diary entries and much more to convince Meg that Ben has actually killed his wife Maria years ago, so eventually Meg decided to leave town, but Ben was not ready to give up on Meg, so he went to Ludlow to get Meg. The couple soon reunited and it seemed like things were finally getting better for them.

Then came December 1997. Meg and her friends decided to spend New Year on a mystery island that Ben bought and everything was going fine until someone started to murder the people on the boat, and on the island. Meg faces the killer on various occasions, but never knew who it was. At the same time, Mark, who was also murdered, revealed to Tim that Ben killed him, but nobody knew that it was actually Ben's evil twin brother Derek Evans. 2–3 months later, it was revealed that Derek has been keeping Ben captive in a warehouse, and was pretending to be Ben for a while. Meg did not suspect anything, but eventually, she discovered the truth and Ben and Derek faced off. Derek was killed (at the time).

Meg and Ben finally reunited and decided to tie the knot. They did not know that a terrible truth was about to be revealed. Meg befriended Dana, a strange woman in a hospital, and she rescued her when Sunset Beach was hit by an earthquake! The women bonded. Meanwhile, Annie and Tim discovered Dana's true identity and decided to use it against Meg. On Meg and Ben's wedding day, everything was going fine. Ben and Meg were married and the celebration started. Then Dana entered and shocked every... it was revealed that Dana is actually Maria Torres, Ben's wife, who was presumed dead years ago. The next few months were hard for Ben who was struggling to decide between his loving wife (who had amnesia) and Meg. Meg and Ben eventually parted, and Meg found comfort in her sister Sara's ex-boyfriend Casey Mitchum. Meg and Ben were later about to make up when Tess Marin entered the show with Benjy Evans. Tess was Maria's friend, and Benjy was Maria and Ben's son. Everyone was shocked.

Meanwhile, Ben started to act strange again. It was revealed that Derek is alive, and Ben was held captive again. Derek plotted with Tess to destroy Ben's life, and they eventually killed Tim, Meg's ex-fiancé. At the very last minute, Derek was finally murdered and Tess was put behind bars. It was also revealed that Benjy is actually Derek and Tess' son. Ben and Maria, who became closer, decided to let each other be happy, and then Meg and Ben were finally happy again. They organized a double wedding with their friends Vanessa and Michael, and that's how the show ended. The final scene involved Meg and Ben lying in bed. Meg woke up and realized she was in Ludlow again. She went down to the living room and found all of her friends and enemies in a different role. She was convinced that everything that happened in Sunset Beach was only a dream, but a minute later, she woke up again to find herself with Ben, in Sunset Beach, and he assured her that it's all real and that she was truly "Mrs Ben Evans".

=== Tiffany Thorne ===
- played by Adrienne Frantz (January 6, 1997―May 15, 1997) and Jennifer Banko-Stewart (May 20, 1997―August 29, 1997)

Tiffany Thorne was a teenage runaway introduced in the first episode. She was a rebel from the beginning, and she always tried to do what's best for her. Already in the first episode, she stole a bag from Meg Cummings and then used the letter inside to play with Ben Evans's mind. She fell in love with Sean Richards and Mark Wolper fell in love with her. The triangle was broken off in just a few months when the writers decided to write out Tiffany due to a lack of storyline. Sean's mother Olivia Richards gave her money to leave town.

=== Mark Wolper ===
- played by Nick Stabile (January 6, 1997―January 20, 1998)

A D.J. and waiter. He moved into Surf Central along with Casey, Rae, Meg and Michael. He fell in love with Tiffany Thorne, but their love was never meant to be because she only had eyes for Sean Richards. He was friends with Meg Cummings. They were always close, but she was in love with Ben. The writers decided to kill him off during the Terror Island storyline in January 1998. He showed interest in Gabi Martinez too, but they never got a chance to explore that story.

=== Caitlin Deschanel ===
Caitlin Deschanel
- Sunset Beach character
- Portrayed by: Vanessa Dorman (1997–1998); Kam Heskin (1998–1999)
- First appearance: January 10, 1997
- Last appearance: December 31, 1999
- Created by: Robert Guza, Jr.
- Introduced by: Gary Tomlin, Aaron Spelling and E. Duke Vincent
In-universe information
- Other names: Caitlin Richards
- Occupation: Student
- Father: Gregory Richards
- Mother: Olivia Richards
- Stepmother: Annie Richards (1998–1999)
- Brothers: Sean Richards
- Husband: Cole Deschanel (1998–present)
- Children: Trey Deschanel

- played by Vanessa Dorman (January 9, 1997―June 18, 1998) and Kam Heskin (June 24, 1998―December 31, 1999)

In December 1998, a writer from Soap Opera Update previewed the soap's 1999 stories. They revealed that Caitlin harassment storyline would intensify. The show's head writer Margaret DePriest told the reporter that the "obscene" phone calls would continue and "esculate to a haunting conclusion in February 1999." She added "it's the shock of her life when she finds out who it is!"

Caitlin was presented as the daughter of a rich lawyer Gregory Richards and Olivia Richards. She fell in love with Cole Deschanel, a mysterious jewel thief and their love was constantly threatened by her over-protective and sinister father. At the same time, Cole slept with Caitlin's mother, Olivia, but he did not know that Olivia was actually his girlfriend's mother. Various times, Gregory tried to get rid of Cole, even by hiring a hit man to kill him, but he did not succeed. Thing got even more complicated. At the same time, both Caitlin and Olivia got pregnant. After a car accident, Caitlin lost her baby, but she decided to keep pretending to be pregnant, so she would not lose Cole. Meanwhile, Olivia finally found happiness again with Gregory. Caitlin sought help from Annie Douglas to find a baby that Caitlin could use as her own. At the same time, Annie plotted to win over Gregory, so she decided to make a huge turn-over. When Olivia gave birth, Annie stole the baby and gave it to Caitlin. Olivia thought her baby had died and Caitlin had no idea that she had her mother's child. This, of course caused Gregory and Olivia's divorce.

Caitlin and Cole were finally happy. They had a baby and they got married, it seemed like everything was perfect, in the summer of 1998, Cole and Caitlin were also involved in the tsunami storyline. Cole met his former lover, Francesca Vargas and Francesca tried to win him over, but he only loved Caitlin. When Francesca was murdered, they were also suspects, but none of them murdered her, but Gregory is the one who actually killed Francesca. Olivia was shocked to find out that Caitlin's baby is actually her own. Caitlin had hard time dealing with the truth, and this caused a big fight between Cole and Caitlin.

Caitlin and Gregory were shocked to learn that Olivia and Cole had an affair years ago. It was then revealed that Cole is actually Trey's father. This led to a fight between Gregory and Cole, after which Gregory went missing and everyone presumed him dead. Caitlin had to struggle with the fact that Trey is not hers and she was even more shocked when Cole was caught by London authorities, and went missing. He eventually returned in the final episode and reunited with his one/only love, Caitlin.

== Later additions ==
=== Jimmy Harrison ===
- played by V.P. Oliver (March 19, 1997―December 26, 1997) and Jeffery Wood (January 23, 1998―March 23, 1999)

Jimmy Harrison was introduced in March 1997 as the son of Virginia Harrison, a villain. During his time on the show, Jimmy was involved in various storylines but did not have his own storyline. He had to cope with the fact that one of his idols, Michael Bourne killed his father Jackson during a gang war. He was always supportive of his mother, who plotted to win Michael for herself. In the beginning of 1998, the character was recast with a younger actor. Jimmy was written out in March 1999 when Virginia was institutionalized.

=== Tyus Robinson ===
- played by Russell Curry (June 19, 1997―December 31, 1999)

Tyus Robinson was one more of the typical soap opera doctors. He never had much of a story for himself, but he was involved in various medical cases. He first came onto canvas as the doctor of Olivia Richards during her pregnancy, and was then involved (although he did not know it) in the baby switch story. His next storyline involved Vanessa Hart, who had just been poisoned by Virginia Harrison into believing she had Martin's Syndrome.

Tyus tried to cure Vanessa and eventually helped her. He then fell in love with her, although she had always loved Michael Bourne. Meanwhile, Virginia's next plot was even more disgusting. She stole Tyus' sperm and inserted it into Vanessa by using a Turkey baster. Vanessa then got pregnant and it was later revealed that the child was Tyus'. Tyus was ready to be a great father, but before anything could happen, Vanessa lost her child. During the rest of the show, Tyus became closer friends with both Vanessa and Michael.

=== Derek Evans ===
Derek Evans
- Sunset Beach character
- Portrayed by: Clive Robertson
- Duration: 1997–99
- First appearance: December 30, 1997
- Last appearance: December 16, 1999
- Created by: Meg Bennett
- Introduced by: Gary Tomlin, Aaron Spelling and E. Duke Vincent
In-universe information
- Siblings: Ben Evans; Ted Evans
- Children: Benjy Evans

- played by Clive Robertson, who also portrays his identical twin brother Ben

Derek first appeared on December 30, 1997, when he was played by a stunt performer in a mask, being the killer on the boat. His first appearance with his face revealed was on January 16, 1998, when Clive Robertson stepped into the role. The character was killed off in June 1998, only to be brought back in September 1999, and killed again in December 1999.

Derek's first venture to Sunset Beach was in 1993 (off-screen), when he seduced his brother Ben's wife, Maria Torres, and staged her death. Just before New Year's Eve 1997, this time on-screen, murders started to happen on a mysterious island owned by Ben Evans. The murderer was Derek, who was a true psychopath trying to destroy his brother's life. Derek pretended to be Ben for months seducing Ben's current fiancé Meg Cummings until it was revealed that Derek was holding Ben captive, and eventually Ben and Derek had a confrontation on the top of a cliff ending in Derek falling to his death. A mysterious woman named Tess Marin arrived in Sunset Beach in 1999 and revealed that Maria and Ben also have a son named Benji who Maria had abandoned, during the time she had lost her memory, and Tess adopted him. Maria and Meg grew suspicious of Tess and Ben decided to investigate by going to Seattle where Tess claims to be from.

Ben returned a few weeks later and confronted Tess about who she really was. Then, in a plot twist, he was revealed to be Ben's evil twin, Derek, back from the dead. Once again Derek had imprisoned Ben when he was on his way to Seattle and had been impersonating him. He and Tess were, in fact, lovers who were the real parents of Benji. Derek then seduced Maria and Meg simultaneously. One day he and Tess were caught kissing by Meg's ex fiancé Tim Truman. Derek tried to stop Tim from revealing the truth and eventually strangled him to death after many attempts to kill him. He buried Tim in a cement mixer, ensuring his secret with Tess was safe. Maria finally discovered Derek and Tess' secret, and she too was imprisoned with Ben. Ben and Maria made their escape and pulled a gun on Derek. Ben and Derek struggled over the gun, and Derek was killed. Ben married Meg on the final episode of Sunset Beach.

=== Hank Cummings ===
- played by John Martin (recurring September 22, 1997―December 11, 1997, contract February 5, 1998―December 31, 1999)

Hank was a typical farmer father who supported his daughters Meg and Sara and his wife Joan. He never had much of a story (although he was on contract) and was mostly included in family scenes. He appeared when Meg returned to Kansas in September 1997, and then later arrived to Sunset Beach to live there with his wife after their farm was destroyed. He opened the Shock Wave restaurant with his wife Joan.

=== Joan Cummings ===
- played by Carol Potter (recurring January 6, 1997―December 11, 1997, contract February 5, 1998―December 31, 1999)

Joan is a typical stay at home mom. She lived in Kansas with her husband, Hank. When her daughter Meg ran away to Sunset Beach at her wedding day, Joan was supportive and often gave her advice. At the beginning of 1998, the Cummings lost their farm and the family was moved to Sunset Beach. Although Joan was officially a regular, she and her husband never had much of a story, and were primarily there to support their daughters, Meg and Sara. Joan and her husband co-created Shock Wave.

=== A.J. Deschanel ===
- played by Gordon Thomson (May 11, 1998―December 31, 1999)

A legend named A.J. Deschanel was mentioned various times during 1997. It was not until 1998 that we learned more about his character. Father of Cole and Leo Deschanel, A.J. entered the world of Sunset Beach when he rescued Olivia Richards from committing suicide. The recently divorced Olivia was A.J's former love, and they soon reunited. Her ex-husband Gregory Richards was A.J.'s primary rival throughout his time on the show, and the two men had constant confrontations.

A.J. had two sons, Cole, who he worked to rebuild a relationship with, and Leo, who was a relatively minor character. A.J. was also temporarily involved with Francesca Vargas, who was later murdered. A.J. helped Olivia find her lost son, who turned out to be the child her daughter Caitlin Richards Deschanel was raising. In 1999, Olivia' main rival used voodoo potions to make Olivia, a former alcoholic, start drinking again, which led to the breakup of her relationship with A.J. A.J. ended the show on good terms with Olivia, and beginning a romantic relationship with Bette Katzenkazrahi.

=== Emily Davis ===
- played by Cristi Harris (May 25, 1998―December 31, 1999)

Emily Davis came to Sunset Beach in May 1998 and immediately won the heart of Sean Richards. They met while competing against each other in lifeguard trials, which ended when Sean allowed Emily to win the job. In a matter of days, Emily was shocked to realize that her mother Bette was also is town. They started to build a relationship and over time slowly became closer by facing the usual teenage problems.

During the Rosario Jewels storyline, Emily was blinded by a talisman, but was cured when the curse stopped. Meanwhile, Amy Nielsen was working to try to steal Sean for herself, often using Brad Niklaus in her plots. However Leo Deschanel often came to Emily's rescue. In 1999, Amy bought a voodoo potion to make Sean sleep with her, ending his relationship with Emily. At the end of the show, Amy's lies were exposed and Sean and Emily reunited.

=== Maria Torres ===
Maria Torres
- Sunset Beach character
- Portrayed by: Christina Chambers
- Duration: 1998–99
- First appearance: July 1, 1998
- Last appearance: December 31, 1999
- Created by: Meg Bennett and Christopher Whitesell
- Introduced by: Gary Tomlin, Aaron Spelling and E. Duke Vincent
In-universe information
- Other names: Dana; Maria Rodriguez
- Occupation: Artist
- Parents: Carmen Torres
- Siblings: Ricardo Torres; Antonio Torres
- Spouse: Ben Evans (1993-1999)
- Children: Benjy Evans (adoptive)

- played by Christina Chambers (July 1, 1998―December 31, 1999)

One of the most important characters in the history of Sunset Beach was Maria Torres Evans. She was presumed dead in 1993 and although she never appeared on-screen until 1998, a lot of characters were connected through her. Her husband Ben Evans married Maria whilst she was still a teenager. After her death during a boating trip in a storm, he spent years grieving, and many people suspected that Ben was the one that killed her. Meanwhile, Ben found love in arms of another woman, Meg Cummings. Maria's friend, Annie Douglas Richards tried to play with Meg's mind by forging Maria's diary into thinking that Ben killed Maria, but eventually Annie's plot was discovered. That's when Maria was finally left in peace. In the summer of 1998, Meg befriended an amnesiac woman named Dana in a hospital, who had no idea who she was. It was later discovered by Annie and Tim Truman that Dana is actually Maria. The two plotted to get Maria on the wedding ceremony.

After Meg and Ben got married, "Dana" stormed into the room and surprised everyone who knew her. Ben was shocked to see his wife alive. Maria did not know anything about the past and she constantly tried to convince everyone that she knows what happened to her, but it was yet in 1999 when she learned more about her past. Maria was the reason why Ben could not move on with Meg, and they eventually broke up, although Maria did not want to be with Ben. In 1999, Maria, Ben, Meg and other were surprised when Tess Marin arrived in Sunset Beach with Benjy Evans, who turned out to be Maria and Ben's son. However, neither of them knew that Benjy was actually Tess' son with Derek Evans, Ben's evil twin brother. Derek returned in 1999 and pretended to be Ben, while he held Ben captive. He slept with Maria. His wrath was discovered and he was killed, while Tess ended up in prison. During the last few episodes, Maria decided to let Ben and Meg be happy, and she met a new man in her life, named Ross English. She also decided to adopt Benjy.

=== Francesca Vargas ===
- played by Lisa Guerrero (July 16, 1998―March 19, 1999)

It came as a shock for Cole Deschanel to encounter his ex-lover and a fellow jewel thief Francesca Vargas on the boat that had the same destiny as the Titanic. As much as he reminisced about the old days, Cole wanted Francesca out of his life, mostly to protect his marriage to Caitlin Deschanel. However, it was then when Francesca decided to play the game her way. At the time, she was married to Phillip Vargas, but it seemed like her marriage was everything but peaceful. During that storyline, her husband was killed, and Francesca, without having anything to do, decided to move to Sunset Beach to pursue her old love and new opportunities.

However, it was obvious nobody actually liked her. Francesca always did things the wrong way. She constantly blackmailed people with evidence she collected to get what she wanted. She found a tape of Gabi Martinez and Father Antonio Torres having sex in an exploding building, and blackmailed them with it. She was, at the time, involved in the Rosario Jewels storyline. Also, the tension between Francesca and Caitlin was rising.

Cole tried to convince Francesca to leave Sunset Beach various times, but she always refused the deal. Even A.J. Deschanel, who tried to convince her to do what's right, could not get through to her. Francesca, who also learned about various other plots, soon became everyone's enemy. She even became an ally of Gregory Richards, Caitlin's father. In March 1999, Francesca was shot at and ended up in a hospital (after jumping out a cake wounded). However, she could not gain enough strength to confess about who murdered her. On her way to Hell, Francesca was greeted by Del Douglas and Eddie Connors, also murder victims. It was later revealed that Francesca was murdered by Gregory.

=== Leo Deschanel ===
- played by David Mathiessen (July 22, 1998―March 24, 1999)

Although he was a contract character, Leo did not have any major storylines. He first appeared in summer 1998, and became friends with Sean Richards and Emily Davis, and an instant enemy to Amy Nielsen and Brad Niklaus. He also tried to build a stronger relationship with his father, A.J. He left the show in March 1999.

=== Amy Nielsen ===
- played by Krissy Carlson (recurring December 26, 1997―September 1998, contract September 1998―December 31, 1999)

Amy Nielsen (originally Dreyer) was introduced during the Terror Island serial killer storyline in late 1997, when Sean Richards invited her to spend New Year's on a private island. Amy was originally introduced to be a victim for the killer, but producers decided to keep her. Amy suffered not only the trauma of the island, but learned Sean had only invited her because his original choice, Elizabeth, had vanished (killed by the serial killer). On returning to Sunset Beach Amy wanted nothing to do with Sean.

That summer, Amy and Sean were both guests on the ship Neptune, which was hit by a tsunami, trapping various characters. Amy developed feelings for Sean, and plotted (often using her friend Brad Niklaus to help her) to break up his relationship with Emily Davis and win Sean for herself. Amy was also involved in the Rosario Jewels storyline, when her father, Bernie Nielsen was turned into a skeleton after breaking a curse held by mysterious jewels.

In 1999, Amy succeeded in making Sean sleep with her by drugging him with a voodoo potion bought from Mrs. Moreau, which resulted in Sean and Emily splitting up. However Sean did not pursue a relationship with Amy, even after she stole a nun's habit in order to pretend she was becoming a nun, to show him she was a good person. By the end of the show, Amy accepted she would not have Sean, and started to become closer to Brad, who she realized had been a good friend to her.

=== Brad Niklaus ===
- played by Michael Strickland (recurring June 11, 1998―September 1998, contract September 1998―December 31, 1999)

Brad Niklaus never had much of a story on this show. He came on canvas during the summer of 1998 and was immediately pushed into the hands of Amy Nielsen, for whom Brad would have done anything. Amy was in love with Sean Richards, and she would have done anything to get him. However, Sean was in love with Emily Davis, so Amy plotted to separate them, by using Brad. Brad was known for his lack of smarts, but he constantly competed with others to gain a lifeguard position. Brad often came to Amy's rescue, he always helped her in whatever she needed, but he never got what he actually wanted. Many people despised him because he was Amy's dog. Eventually, when all of Amy's schemes were discovered, in the final episode, it seemed like Amy and Brad were about to become something more than friends.

=== Tess Marin ===
- played by Tracy Melchior (March 9, 1999―December 31, 1999)

Tess Marin came to Sunset Beach in March 1999 with Benjy Evans, who she claimed was the son of Maria Torres and Ben Evans. Tess claimed she had been Maria's best friend and Benjy's nanny during the years Maria was missing (1993–1998).

Tess started to develop a relationship with Tim Truman, but it was later revealed she was working with and romantically involved with Ben's evil twin, Derek Evans, and was using Tim to further their plans. This led to Derek murdering Tim when he discovered Derek's true identity, something Tess felt guilt over (to the point of being haunted by Tim's ghost). During the show's final weeks, Tess was revealed to be Benjy's real mother (with Derek his father), and she and Derek kidnapped several other characters, which led to Derek being killed and Tess arrested. Tess finally agreed to allow Maria to adopt Benjy.

=== Benjy Evans ===
- played by Chase Parker (March 9, 1999―December 31, 1999)

Benjy Evans came to Sunset Beach in March 1999 with Tess Marin, who claimed he was the son of Maria Torres and Ben Evans'. When this was confirmed by paternity tests, he and Tess moved into Ben's house (where Meg and Maria were also living) and was often the reason for fights between them. Eventually, it was revealed that Benjy was Tess Marin and Derek Evans' son, but after Derek was murdered and Tess arrested, Tess allowed Maria to adopt him.

=== Jude Cavanaugh ===
- played by Sean Kanan (August 26, 1999―December 31, 1999)

Jude Cavanaugh entered the world of Sunset Beach in late summer of 1999. He caught the eye of the local citizen Annie Douglas-Richards, a widow who did her best to get her deceased husband's fortune. Jude and Annie started a rocky relationship and eventually ended up together in the final episode. Jude was revealed to be an undercover agent assigned to catch Annie's husband Gregory Richards, a criminal who was presumed dead.

Jude kept the true reason for his arrival a secret and then worked on the case, becoming close to Tobias Richards (family's uncle who later turned out to be Gregory Richards in disguise). Annie and Jude ended up in each other's arms. However, he never got a chance to develop his character more because he was on the show only for five months.

=== Carmen Torres ===
- played by Margarita Cordova (recurring December 23, 1997―December 31, 1999)

Carmen Torres was a person who never trusted people. She was a fortune teller, a person who believed in God and did the best for her children. She premiered in December 1997, when Gabi Martinez, Vanessa Hart and Meg Cummings came to have a little fun and learn what was in their future. It was later revealed that Carmen knew Ben Evans and that Ricardo Torres was her son.

When Ricardo and Gabi became closer again, Carmen did not trust her, and she constantly tried to convince Ricardo to leave Gabi, mostly because her tarot cards told her so. Her daughter Maria was presumed dead in 1993, and her other son Antonio is a priest living far away. Carmen's life turned around when her son Antonio returned to Sunset Beach and fell in love with Gabi, with whom he slept on the night they thought they would die. Carmen knew of the affair and tried to warn Ricardo without breaking his heart. Also, her daughter Maria returned from the dead in September 1998.

Carmen refused not to believe in her tarot cards. She realized that Gabi had an affair with someone, but she did not know who it was with. Gabi and Antonio destroyed the tape, only to learn later that they destroyed the wrong tape. Carmen watched it and realized that her own son had an affair with Gabi. Ricardo and Gabi decided to get married, and Carmen did her best to blackmail Gabi to leave Ricardo. The wedding did not go through, but Ricardo and Gabi stayed together. Carmen always supported her sons and her daughter and always tried to do the best for her family.
