= Gregory Richards =

- Sunset Beach character
- Portrayed by: Sam Behrens
- Duration: 1997–1999
- First appearance: January 6, 1997
- Last appearance: December 30, 1999
- Created by: Robert Guza, Jr.
- Introduced by: Gary Tomlin, Aaron Spelling and E. Duke Vincent
In-universe information
- Other names: Tobias Richards
- Occupation: Attorney; Shareholder in various buildings
- Wife: Olivia Richards (until 1998); Annie Douglas Richards (1998–99)
- Sons: Sean Richards
- Daughters: Caitlin Deschanel

Gregory Richards is a fictional character from the American television soap opera Sunset Beach, portrayed by Sam Behrens. He made his first appearance during the show's debut episode broadcast on January 6, 1997. Gregory is one of the serial's 21 original contract characters. Behrens was approached by the Sunset Beach producers about the role, but he was hesitant about meeting with them, as he had been planning on returning to New York City. He was eventually persuaded to attend the meeting and he signed on to play Gregory.

At the beginning of Sunset Beach, Gregory is married to Olivia Richards (Lesley-Anne Down) and is a wealthy attorney. He is characterised as being a powerful, manipulative wheeler dealer. Behrens thought Gregory was "pretty nasty" to begin with, so he attempted to soften him by playing his scenes with more compassion. Gregory and Olivia are shown to have a complicated marriage, with Behrens calling them "dysfunctional". Seli Groves of the Times-News later noted that Gregory was "tilting toward villainy" after he committed a number of bad deeds. Behrens said that whatever Gregory does, he does it for his family. Gregory later kills Francesca Vargas (Lisa Guerrero) and goes on the run, after being tricked into confessing to her murder.

Behrens won Best Actor from Sunset Beach at the 1997 Soap Opera Update Awards. He was twice nominated for Outstanding Villain at the Soap Opera Digest Awards. Carolyn Hinsey of the Daily News' was critical of the character's early personality, calling him "a one-note villain whose story line consisted of basically telling people off." Soap critic Candace Havens said actors like Behrens and Down brought "a certain class and depth to the show."

== Casting ==
In November 1996, a reporter for the Tampa Bay Times announced that Sam Behrens had been cast as Gregory Richards. Behrens was planning on returning to New York City, where he first started his career, when he was approached by the Sunset Beach producers about appearing in the show. He was hesitant about meeting with them, but his manager eventually convinced him and he admitted the producers sold him on the show. He told United Feature Syndicate columnist Nancy M. Reichardt: "I came away from that meeting feeling very good about what they wanted to do." Behrens signed on to play Gregory, who was described as "the show's resident wheeler dealer who possesses a lot of power." Producer Aaron Spelling felt actors like Behrens, Kathleen Noone and Hank Cheyne, who were considered daytime veterans, would be able to help those who had never acted in daytime television before. Behrens defended the show's low ratings in November 1997, saying that it was to be expected, as the show was still new.

== Development ==
Gregory is one of the show's 21 original contract characters. He was introduced as the husband of Olivia Richards (played by Lesley-Anne Down). Mike Hughes from The Honolulu Advertiser said Gregory was "a wealthy and slippery lawyer", while Newsday's Marvin Kitman described him as a "high-powered, silver-tongued attorney" and "a born manipulator". The serial's official website stated that Gregory was "conniving". Behrens initially said that it was "a matter of opinion" whether Gregory was a bad guy, but added that his character often did "wonderful things... for himself." Comparing Gregory with his General Hospital role of good guy Jake Meyer, Behrens said he enjoyed playing the "bad guy", as he got to do everything with less restrictions and he could even occasionally be nice.

Behrens admitted that his character was "pretty nasty" at the start of the serial, and he took credit for softening Gregory up. He stated: "I don't think anyone is one level, or two-leveled for that matter. I don't think that is very interesting – not even in daytime." He began playing his scenes with more compassion and when the scriptwriters saw some scenes between Gregory and his daughter Caitlin Richards (Vanessa Dorman) that had "heart" they decided to go along with it. However, Behrens told Carolyn Hinsey of the Daily News that he thought the scriptwriters "went too far" showing Gregory's softer side and he had become too nice, so he hoped that they would show his "many levels" in the future. Hinsey noted that Gregory seemed to have a unnatural attachment to Caitlin, which Behrens believed could be explained by his take on Gregory's fictional backstory. He said that Gregory never received the love he wanted, and he also struggles to get it from Olivia, but has found it with his daughter. Behrens thought they had a connection that Gregory could not get from an adult woman. When Caitlin becomes an adult, Gregory feels that no one is good enough for her, especially her love interest Cole St. John (Eddie Cibrian), a jewel thief with similarities to Gregory.

The writers also began exploring Gregory's "complicated" marriage to Olivia. Behrens called the couple "dysfunctional", but said there was "a deep love" between them. He commented "What got them to where they are now is Gregory's fear of... fill in the blank. How deep do you want to go? But the more you see, the more interesting their battles are." Behrens thought Gregory and Olivia's actions came down to love and fear, and they were not meant to be mean to those around them, they just did things for themselves that made it seem that they were mean. At the start of the serial, Gregory discovers that Olivia is having an affair with Del Douglas (John Reilly) and is "extremely jealous". Olivia and Caitlin later became pregnant at the same time, after they both have sex with Cole. Behrens called his character "the stupidest man in the world" for believing Olivia's lies about the pregnancy.

In December 1997, Seli Groves of the Times-News observed that Gregory appeared to be "tilting toward villainy", after hiring a hitman to kill Cole and telling Caitlin that her baby died at birth, so he and Olivia could raise it as their own. Behrens said that if he were Gregory he would definitely disagree with the villain tag, explaining "I would recognize that all great men, such as myself, are often seen as evil or no good because they get what they set out to achieve. But just because I might, more often than not, use Machiavellian means to get what I want, that's still no reason for my family, or anyone else, to think any less of me." He concluded that anything Gregory does, he does it for his family, who were not always appreciative of his actions.

In December 1998, a writer from Soap Opera Update previewed the soap's 1999 stories during an interview with the show's head writer Margaret DePriest. They revealed Gregory would make "sweeping changes in his life, both personally and professionally." In early 1999, Gregory becomes a murderer after he kills Francesca Vargas (Lisa Guerrero). An Inside Soap writer noted that "the heat is on" for Gregory after the truth emerges. He is seen attempting to flee Sunset Beach, only for his escape to end badly when he falls into the "treacherous" sea. His body is not found, leading to mixed reactions from characters close to him. His daughter Caitlin is "devastated", while his wife Annie Richards (Sarah G. Buxton) realises she is about to become very rich. However, Gregory is alive and only slightly injured. After hauling himself out of the sea, Gregory hides out in a cave and vows that Annie and Cole will pay for tricking him into confessing to Francesca's murder. The plot led to Behrens portraying Gregory while he was pretending to be his own uncle, Tobias.

Later that same year, Whitehorse Star's Sally Stone reported that Behrens would take "a long vacation" while contract negotiations were ongoing. Stone believed that if Behrens re-signed to the show, his character would likely be "quickly and 'interestingly' redeemed" after confessing to the murder of Francesca. However, Sunset Beach was cancelled by NBC that same year and the last episode aired in December 1999.

== Storylines ==
Attorney Gregory appears to have the perfect job and perfect family, but his wife, Olivia Richards is having an affair with his best friend, Del Douglas and is almost always drunk. Gregory's children, Caitlin and Sean (Randy Spelling), fall in love with people that Gregory hates, so he tries to scare or kill his daughter's boyfriend, Cole Deschanel, and remove his son's runaway girlfriend, Tiffany Thorne (Adrienne Frantz; Jennifer Banko-Stewart). Gregory is happy when Olivia becomes pregnant. When his daughter miscarries following a car accident, she asks Annie Douglas to help her find a baby, and Annie plots to take Olivia's child and present it as Caitlin's. Gregory is hurt when Olivia tells him that their baby was stillborn and their marriage is over.

Annie schemes her way into Gregory's life and they marry on the day that Annie could have lost her father's money. Annie and Gregory's marriage is not perfect, as Annie is always plotting to get what she wants and Gregory has other concerns. He continues to try and remove Cole from his daughter's life. Sean forgets about his father because he never did anything for him. Gregory and the rest of the family are shocked when it emerges that Caitlin's son, Trey is really Olivia's and that she had an affair with Cole.

Francesca Vargas is murdered and half of the Sunset Beach citizens are suspected of the crime. But it emerges that it was actually Gregory who killed Francesca. After fighting with Cole, Gregory falls into the ocean and his body is not found. However, he comes onto shore a day later and decides to play with the minds of his loved ones. He pretends to be Tobias Richards, his own relative, and messes with everyone's minds. He is eventually caught by Annie's love interest Jude Cavanaugh (Sean Kanan) and he is sent to prison for Francesca's murder.

== Reception ==
For his portrayal of Gregory, Behrens won Best Actor from Sunset Beach at the 1997 Soap Opera Update Awards hosted by Soap Opera Update magazine. Behrens received a nomination for Outstanding Villain at the 14th Soap Opera Digest Awards in 1998. He received a nomination in the same category the following year.

While reviewing the first episodes, Jennifer Bowles of the Pensacola News Journal branded the character "a high-powered attorney possessing the moral code of snake." Julia Shih of The Michigan Daily believed Gregory was one of the characters "we're supposed to hate", along with Del. The Daily News's Carolyn Hinsey was critical of the character, calling him "a one-note villain whose story line consisted of basically telling people off." A few months later, Hinsey said the character was "a clever, rich tycoon" and dubbed the pregnancy story with Olivia as "convoluted".

Candace Havens, reporting for The Messenger, found that Behrens, along with Lesley-Anne Down, Kathleen Noone and Leigh Taylor-Young, brought "a certain class and depth to the show." In his review of the show, Entertainment Weekly's Ken Tucker also commented on Behrens' performance, writing that "the best, most straightforward acting is being done by Sam Behrens — General Hospital's Jake, here playing Down's husband — only serves to make him look like the only person not in on the joke." Seli Groves of the Times-News noted that Behrens was having "a great time" playing the "shrewd, calculating lawyer".

In a November 1999 feature on Sunset Beach's cancellation and missed storyline opportunities, syndicated reporter Nancy M. Reichardt was critical of Gregory's storylines, writing: "Behrens played a nifty villain whose obsessive devotion to family – mainly his daughter – did not justify his machinations, but did temper viewer indignation toward him. But, again, the show went too far when he terrorized his own daughter – for her own good. Then came Uncle Tobias in a fright wig so bad it distracted from the story at hand.
