= Virginia Harrison =

Fictional TV character

- Sunset Beach character
- Portrayed by: Dominique Jennings
- Duration: 1997–1999
- First appearance: March 17, 1997
- Last appearance: March 4, 1999
- Created by: Robert Guza, Jr.
- Introduced by: Gary Tomlin, Aaron Spelling and E. Duke Vincent
In-universe information
- Other names: Nurse Jones; FBI Agent Jones
- Occupation: Waitress; Nurse
- Husband: Jackson Harrison
- Sons: Jimmy Harrison

Virginia Harrison is a fictional character from the American television soap opera Sunset Beach, played by Dominique Jennings. She made her first appearance during the episode broadcast on March 17, 1997. Jennings originally auditioned for another role in the soap. Virginia was supposed to feature in ten episodes but producers offered Jennings a permanent contract to join the show's regular cast. Virginia is characterized as a "bad girl" and has been central to a controversial storyline in which she impregnates a fellow female character without their consent. In the plot, Virginia uses a sperm laced turkey baster to assault her love rival, Vanessa Hart (Sherri Saum). The story formed one of Virginia's main story arcs in which she attempts to snare Michael Bourne (Jason Winston George) from Vanessa. This is included Virginia impersonating a nurse to fool Vanessa, which during filming Jennings wore a fat suit to create Virginia's disguise. Jennings made her final appearance as Virginia during the episode broadcast on March 4, 1999.

== Development ==
Jennings was cast into the role of Virginia after she auditioned for another part in the program. She was originally contracted to appear in ten episodes of the program. However, after her first day on set, Jennings was offered a three-year contract, which she accepted.

While the character is portrayed as "the bitch of the beach", Jennings said that Virginia has "depth and edge" to her. She described her as a single mother from South Central L.A., who is "trying to make a better life for her son" but making Vanessa and Michael's lives miserable in the process. She opined that Virginia's interest and appeal came through the fact she started out as a completely different character. Jennings also said that there was no other black female portraying such a villainess on daytime television during the nineties. She also had so much fun playing Virginia that she had to remind herself to "snap out" of character.

Writers created a love-triangle story-arc for Virginia, Michael Bourne (Jason Winston George) and Vanessa Hart (Sherri Saum). They also created a detailed backstory between Virginia and Michael, which forms the premise of their relationship. Her husband, Jackson Harrison was killed by Michael in a gang-related gun fight some years prior. Virginia was left to bring up their son, Jimmy Harrison as a single-parent. George told Seli Groves from Times-News that Michael has an "overdeveloped sense of responsibility" to care for Virginia and Jimmy, to make amends for Jackson's death. George believed that Michael knew Virginia wanted him but made excuses not to be with her. He explained "instead of accepting the fact that she could care for him because of who he is, he tells himself that her interest in him comes out of the fact that she has no husband." He wanted Michael to make thoughtful and informed decisions about Virginia and Vanessa, rather than making emotional ones. He revealed that Michael wants to be with Vanessa but his past with Virginia continually conflicts him. George told Groves that Michael thinks "no one understands him the way Virginia does". Unlike Vanessa, she knows the "violent world" they came from, he thinks Virginia is "beautiful" and he "cares for" Jimmy, which gives him "a ready-made family." Writers used Michael's sense of responsibility to keep Virginia a constant presence in his storylines, despite Michael's love for Vanessa. George concluded that "He feels he doesn't deserve to have what he really wants. Instead, he feels he's obligated to do what he believes is the right thing for Virginia, regardless of what personal sacrifice he might have to make."

Virginia is subject to a storyline in which she drugs and impregnates love rival Vanessa with Tyus Robinson's (Russell Curry) sperm, using a turkey baster. In doing so Virginia hopes to win the heart of fellow character Michael. The storyline proved unpopular with some viewers. Carolyn Hinsey from New York Daily News reported that Sunset Beach writers caused controversy with the storyline and annoyed viewers. She noted a surge in negative comments about the story appearing on internet message boards, with some noting Virginia's actions amounted to rape. Hinsey researched with law enforcement that Virginia had definitely committed sexual abuse onto Vanessa. A NBC publicist defended the storyline and explained to Hinsley that it was supposed to be "outrageous like many stories on daytime dramas today. It is never our intention to offend anyone." Hinsley added that Virginia, Vanessa and Michael's love-triangle plot made them some of the most popular African-American characters featured in US soap operas. Though she believed the "turkey baster" plot damaged their popularity.

In another part of the storyline Virginia dresses up as her alter-ego "Nurse Jones" in an attempt to fool and run Vanessa's stay in the hospital. Jennings was required to wear a padded fat suit and a "whacked-out" wig. Jennings said "It's really old and itchy, and it's hard to tell I have it on with the nurse's uniform, because the costume is so boxy. It's not so much heavy as it is hot. And the wig is just kind of out there." In December 1998, a writer from Soap Opera Update previewed the soap's 1999 stories. They revealed that Virginia would continue in her attempts to snare Michael during a time he tries to repair his "shattered romance" with Vanessa.

Virginia was also featured in the show's infamous "Terror Island" storyline, which depicted killer Derek Evans (Clive Robertson) drugging several characters on an island holiday, in an attempt to murder them. When Michael begins to hallucinate from the drugs, he visualises Virginia's face peeling off.

In February 1999, it was announced that Sunset Beach had decided to end Jennings' contract with the serial, after they axed Virginia from the series. However, producers decided not to kill her off and did not rule out a future return. The producer's decision was storyline motivated and Virginia made her final appearance during the episode broadcast on March 4, 1999.

== Storylines ==
Virginia is a person that fights for what she wants and she knows how to get it; she is a widow raising her son Jimmy and she relies on the help of Michael, the man that accidentally shot her husband in a gang war, when she learns of Michael developing a relationship with a reporter named Vanessa, she decides to fight for what she claims as hers and she infiltrates Michael's life in order to get rid of her, claiming that her neighborhood isn't safe because of constant robberies, Virginia gets Michael to give her a place to stay at Surf Central, a house where Michael lives with a number of his other friends, Virginia doesn't hide her feelings for Michael in front of Vanessa and she makes it clear that she wants Vanessa gone, when Michael explains that he sees Virginia only as a friend, Virginia refuses to back down and only becomes more keen on breaking up Michael and Vanessa. She follows Michael and Vanessa one day to the cabin where they arranged a private evening and sets the cabin on fire in order to prevent them from making love.

After Virginia successfully covering her tracks, she goes on a private New Year's Eve celebration with Michael, Vanessa and the rest of the Surf Central gang, where her life is put at risk when a serial killer is on the loose, Virginia gets a chance to get rid of Vanessa, but instead decides to help her out when they find themselves in harm's way, when they return to Sunset Beach, it appears that Virginia has finally given up on removing Vanessa from her life, but in reality Virginia is only faking a friendship, Virginia realizes that she needs to go to extreme measures to get rid of Vanessa and when she learns that Vanessa's mother is suffering from a rare genetic illness called Martin's Syndrome, she decides to use that info for her benefit, she goes to see a dark magic expert named Mrs. Moreau (Joyce Guy) who helps her make a potion that makes Vanessa believe that she has the illness. Vanessa leaves town in order not to hurt Michael and Virginia finally has her victory – that is, until Michael discovers that Vanessa hasn't really left town.

Virginia accidentally walks in on Vanessa and her doctor named Tyus in an embrace when they experiment with a drug that could cure Vanessa, and it gives her an idea on how to get rid of Vanessa once-and-for all, however, when the town is hit by an earthquake, Virginia thinks that her son Jimmy died and she is convinced that God is punishing her for her crimes, however, she covers her story, when she learns that Jimmy is alive, she then goes forward with her most evil plot ever – impregnating Vanessa with Tyus's sperm which she steals from a local sperm bank, she does so, using, of all things, a turkey baster and then blackmails Dr. Green into changing Vanessa's due date, Michael and Vanessa are finally broken up when Vanessa lies to Michael about who the father of the baby is and Virginia berates Vanessa for lying. Her world comes crumbling down when Michael investigates Dr. Green and overhears Virginia threatening him. Virginia confesses her crimes to Michael and Vanessa before being carted off to a mental institution of the criminally insane.

== Reception ==
For her portrayal of Virginia, Jennings was nominated for "Outstanding Villainess" at the 15th annual Soap Opera Digest Awards in February 1999. Sally Stone of the Portsmouth Daily Times said that Virginia delivered "a nasty Kodak moment" when she manipulated pictures of Vanessa and Tyus. Mike Turner of Soap Opera Weekly said that Virginia became the "bitch" of Sunset Beach. She was described in Upscale magazine as being "a lowdown and dirty gurl from da 'hood".

Kathleen Morgan of the Daily Record said the turkey baster storyline was "incredible". While the Pittsburgh Post-Gazette included the storyline in their feature list of the most "over-the-top" in the history of soap opera. They added that "sticking it in another woman" was the most "outrageous" plot to ever feature in the genre. However, the storyline proved controversial with some viewers. Candace Havens of the Charleston Gazette-Mail said "It is certainly an uncomfortable storyline for viewers. Let's hope it ends soon". She also said that through the storyline, Sunset Beach showed how a "fledging soap opera" does not always "stick with what works" with viewers. Havens later opined that Virginia was characterized as a "bad girl". Soap Opera Update chose the turkey baster story as the "Most Disgusting Plot" featured in US soap operas during 1998. A reporter revealed that viewers "hated" the story, branding it "tasteless". They added that disbelief of not only a writer suggesting the storyline but an entire team of writers agreeing to it. They added "surely there must have been someone who could see this plot for what it is: a woman committing a completely despicable act against another woman. And, yes, we think it could be called rape." They concluded that the soap's writers were "completely unprepared for the viewer backlash" and it would be wise for them to abandon the story because "they went too far".

Mike Turner from The Record assessed that soap operas had "improbable to outright bizarre" stories and there had been "some real doozies". Turner included Virginia's turkey baster story in their list of "five most outrageous soap story lines" that "have really been over the top". Turner, then writing for The News Tribune, included the story in a list of five plots that were "simply silly". He noted it culminated in Virginia being "hauled off to the psych ward". A reporter from Northamptonshire Evening Telegraph opined that "Virginia inseminated Vanessa with stolen sperm using a turkey baster" was an example of Sunset Beach's "bizarre storylines" that kept viewers watching. In a Time Out feature profiling "best soap opera moments", British playwright Bola Agbaje chose the turkey baster plot as the most memorable.

A reporter from All About Soap branded the turkey baster plot as one of the show's "classic moments", noting the "strange nature" of the conception. They assessed that she "made an early start on her Christmas preparations when she went on the loose with a turkey baster." The critic concluded that it was unsurprising that the "claws were out" once the truth was revealed, adding that Virginia is a "scheming" character and her admission to a psychiatric hospital "serves her right". In 2008, Luke Kerr from Daytime Confidential cited the plot as one of the plots that viewers "regret" from the soap opera.

Seli Groves from The Jersey Journal wrote that Virginia's departure shocked "her many fans who liked the idea of having a black actor play a villain." Groves hoped for Virginia's return either as a "redeemed character" or "still capable of creating mayhem wherever it suits her."
