= About Fifty =

- Directed by: Thomas Johnston
- Written by: Martin Grey; Drew Pillsbury; Thomas Johnston
- Produced by: Ian Toporoff
- Starring: Wendie Malick; Martin Grey; Drew Pillsbury
- Production company: Five-Oh Productions
- Distributed by: Screen Media Films
- Release date: January 7, 2011
- Running time: 119 minutes
- Country: United States
- Language: English

About Fifty (also known as Fifty-nothing) is a 2011 independent comedy film written by Thomas Johnston and Drew Pillsbury. It stars Wendie Malick, Michaela McManus, Anne-Marie Johnson, Jessalyn Gilsig, Martin Grey, Drew Pillsbury, and Kathleen Noone. It premiered January 7, 2011 at the Palm Springs International Film Festival.

Screen Media Films acquired the film for a November release under the new title About Fifty.

== Cast ==
- Wendie Malick as Kate
- Michaela McManus as Alix
- Anne-Marie Johnson as Erin
- Jessalyn Gilsig as Jessica
- Kathleen Noone as Peggy
- Steve Hytner as Larry
- Miriam Flynn as Nancy
- Audrey Wasilewski as Becca
- Rebecca Field as Michelle
- Garrett Strommen as Dan
- Martin Grey as Adam
- Drew Pillsbury as Jon
