= Priscilla Garita =

American actress (born 1968)

- Born: March 14, 1968 (age 58); New York City, New York, U.S.
- Occupation: Actress
- Years active: 1993–present

Priscilla Garita (born March 14, 1968) is an American actress, best known for her role as Gabi Martinez in NBC soap opera Sunset Beach.

== Life and career ==
Garita was born in New York City. She is of Costa Rican descent. In 1993 she made her soap debut on Another World, and later had recurring roles in All My Children and As the World Turns.

Garita is best for playing the role of Gabi Martinez on the now-defunct NBC soap Sunset Beach for the show's entire run from January 1997 to December 1999. Garita was credited during January 1997, but her first appearance on the soap was in February 1997. In 2000 she was cast in the NBC pilot of the short-lived TV series Titans, but later was replaced by Lourdes Benedicto. Garita has also portrayed the role of Theresa Lopez-Fitzgerald on another NBC soap, Passions on a temporary basis from August to September 2004. During this time, Lindsay Hartley (the original Theresa) was on maternity leave with husband Justin Hartley.

Garita appeared on number of primetime dramas include Diagnosis Murder, Charmed, Ghost Whisperer, Law & Order: LA, Off the Map, CSI: Miami, Castle, and Rizzoli & Isles. In 2011, she appeared on General Hospital as Lupe. In March 2022, she replaced Inga Cadranel as Harmony Miller for the multiple episodes of General Hospital when Cadranel had COVID during filming.

== Filmography ==
Year	Title	Role	Notes
1993	Another World	Kathy Wolikowski	Recurring role
1994	All My Children	Anita Santos	Recurring role
1996	As the World Turns	Rita	Recurring role
1997–1999	Sunset Beach	Gabi Martinez-Torres	Series regular Nominated - ALMA Award for Outstanding Actress in a Daytime Soap Opera (1999)
1998	Sunset Beach: Shockwave	Gabi Martinez	TV movie
1999	Bright Nights, Dark Days		
2000	Titans	Samantha Sanchez	TV pilot
2000	Road Dogz	Lucy	
2000	Diagnosis Murder	Patty	Episode: "Out of the Past"
2001	Ed	Jenny	Episode: "Changes"
2003	Undermind	Secretary	
2004	Passions	Theresa Lopez-Fitzgerald	Series regular, 20 episodes: August 30–September 28, 2004
2005	212	Lana	
2005	Charmed	Stacy	Episode: "Desperate Housewitches"
2008	InAlienable	Miriam Norris	
2008	The Fall	Reporter	
2009	Ghost Whisperer	Doctor Chase	Episode: "Birthday Presence"
2010	Law & Order: LA	Angela Cordero	Episode: "Ballona Creek"
2011	Off the Map	Tica	Episode: "It's a Leaf"
2011	CSI: Miami	Dr. Galaway	Episode: "Paint It Black"
2011	Castle	Bridge Officer	Episode: "Knockout"
2011	Borderline Murder	Maria	TV movie
2011	General Hospital	Lupe	Recurring role, 13 episodes
2012	Overnight	Security	
2012	Notes from Dad		TV movie
2013	Rizzoli & Isles	Bianca Valdez	Episode: "But I Am a Good Girl"
2013	Insidious: Chapter 2	Natalie	
2014	Zoe Gone	Detective Karen Danner	
2014	Guests	Maricelle Foster	Short film
2014	The Heyday of the Insensitive Bastards	Maricelle Foster	
2017	Ray Donovan	Carmen	Episodes: "Shabbos Goy" and "Shelley Duvall"
2019	Bosch	Nellie Jensen	Episodes: "The Last Scrip" and "Tunnel Vision"
2022	General Hospital	Harmony Miller	Recurring role, 3 episodes
2022–2023	Good Trouble	Bianca Tavez	Recurring role, 4 episodes
2024	Atropia	Gloria	
