= Wanted (2005 TV series) =

- Genre: Police drama
- Created by: Louis St. Clair; Jorge Zamacona
- Written by: Brian Logan; Robert Palm; Paul Pietrantoni; Louis St. Clair; Patrick Wiegers; Bradford Winters; Jorge Zamacona
- Directed by: Félix Enríquez Alcalá; Guy Norman Bee; Steven DePaul; Davis Guggenheim; James Whitmore Jr.; Thomas J. Wright; Alexander Zakrzewski
- Starring: Gary Cole; Ryan Hurst; Josey Scott; Benjamín Benítez; Alex Fernandez; Rashida Jones; Lee Tergesen
- Composers: Rick Marvin; Josh Mobley; Steven M. Stern; John Van Tongeren
- Country of origin: United States
- Original language: English
- No. of seasons: 1
- No. of episodes: 13

Production
- Executive producers: Aaron Spelling; E. Duke Vincent; Jorge Zamacona
- Producers: Mel Efros; Gary Cole
- Running time: 60 minutes
- Production companies: Badlands Entertainment; Spelling Television

Original release
- Network: TNT
- Release: July 31 – December 26, 2005

Wanted is an American primetime police drama television series broadcast on the TNT network which was aired from July 31 to December 26, 2005. The series was created by Louis St. Clair and Jorge Zamacona, and executive produced by Aaron Spelling, E. Duke Vincent and Jorge Zamacona. This series was the last produced by Spelling and Vincent before their death in 2006 and 2024.

== Synopsis ==
The show follows an elite taskforce, with members pulled from the different branches of law enforcement (DEA, United States Marshals, LAPD, ATF, FBI) as they track down Los Angeles's 100 most wanted fugitives and struggle to balance their work and personal lives.

Members of the task force include Conrad Rose (Gary Cole), the Team Leader from L.A. Metro SWAT who is considered the moral center of the unit; Jimmy McGloin (Ryan Hurst), an ATF agent and a bona fide card-carrying conservative; Carla Merced (Rashida Jones), a former Naval Intelligence officer and expert hostage negotiator; Tommy Rodriquez (Benjamín Benítez), an FBI agent not above using his good looks and charm to stop any criminal; Rodney Gronbeck (Josey Scott), an LAPD officer and a tech genius; Joe Vacco (Brendan Kelly), a DEA agent who is currently living at the team's warehouse headquarters after having getting kicked out of his own place; and Eddie Drake (Lee Tergesen), an eight-year veteran of the U.S. Marshals Service and graduate of the L.A. Metro Police Academy. As the team tracks down criminals, often using unconventional (and legally questionable) methods, they discover there is a fine line between justice and the law.

The series was canceled after the first season, at the end of a cliffhanger with whether the group would be prosecuted for overstepping their bounds.

== Cast ==
- Gary Cole as Lt. Conrad Rose
- Ryan Hurst as ATF Field Agent Jimmy McGloin
- Josey Scott as Rodney Gronbeck
- Joaquim de Almeida as Captain Manuel Valenza
- Benjamín Benítez as FBI Special Agent Tommy Rodriguez
- Alex Fernandez as Max Rubio
- Rashida Jones as Detective Carla Merced
- Brendan Kelly as DEA Officer Joe Vacco
- Vince Lozano as Ozzie Devine
- Dedee Pfeiffer as Lucinda Rose
- Karen Sillas as Mariah Belichek
- Lee Tergesen as Eddie Drake
- Dimitri Diatchenko as Dar Sitska

== Episodes ==
| No. | Title | Directed by | Written by | Original release date |
|---|---|---|---|---|
| 1 | "Pilot" | Davis Guggenheim | Story by : Jorge Zamacona & Louis St. Clair; Teleplay by : Jorge Zamacona | July 31, 2005 |
| 2 | "The Wild Bunch" | Guy Bee | Story by : Jorge Zamacona & Louis St. Clair; Teleplay by : Jorge Zamacona | August 7, 2005 |
| 3 | "Rubbing One Out" | Unknown | Unknown | August 14, 2005 |
| 4 | "Badlands" | Alex Zakrzewski | Story by : Jorge Zamacona & Louis St. Clair; Teleplay by : Jorge Zamacona | August 21, 2005 |
| 5 | "The Promise of Darkness" | Unknown | Unknown | August 28, 2005 |
| 6 | "Sex Pistols" | Felix Alcala | Story by : Jorge Zamacona & Louis St. Clair; Teleplay by : Patrick Wiegers | September 4, 2005 |
| 7 | "Click, Click, Boom" | Thomas J. Wright | Story by : Jorge Zamacona & Louis St. Clair; Teleplay by : Brian Logan | September 11, 2005 |
| 8 | "Ronin" | Unknown | Unknown | September 18, 2005 |
| 9 | "Shoot to Thrill" | Unknown | Unknown | December 5, 2005 |
| 10 | "Lips are Lips" | Unknown | Unknown | December 5, 2005 |
| 11 | "La Pistola y El Corazon" | Steven DePaul | Robert Palm | December 12, 2005 |
| 12 | "The Last Temptation" | Felix Alcala | Story by : Jorge Zamacona & Louis St. Clair; Teleplay by : Bradford Winters | December 19, 2005 |
| 13 | "Judas" | Unknown | Unknown | December 26, 2005 |
