= Dominique Jennings =

American actress

- Born: 30 October 1965 (age 60); Stockholm, Sweden
- Occupation: Actress
- Years active: 1990–2011; 2022–present
- Spouse: Lonnie Brandon

Dominique Jennings (born 30 October 1965) is an American actress. She played Virginia Harrison in the NBC soap opera Sunset Beach.

== Life and career ==
Jennings was born in Stockholm, Sweden. Her mother, Ann-Charlotte Dahlqvist, was a Swedish flight attendant, and father, Richard Slater Jennings, was an American artist and journalist. Her mother was killed in January 1969 during a plane crash while taking off from Los Angeles. Jennings moved back to the United States with her father in 1971.

Jennings began her career playing secondary roles in films include Bad Influence, Die Hard 2 (both 1990), A Low Down Dirty Shame (1994) and Seven (1995). On television, she guest-starred on Living Single, Martin, The Fresh Prince of Bel-Air, The Wayans Bros., and The Jamie Foxx Show. In 1997, Jennings was cast as Virginia Harrison in the NBC soap opera Sunset Beach after originally auditioning for another role. She was originally contracted to appear in ten episodes, but was offered a three-year contract after her first day on set, which she accepted. In February 1999, it was announced that Sunset Beach had decided to end Jennings' contract with the serial, after they axed Virginia from the series. However, producers decided not to kill her off and did not rule out a future return. She was nominated in 1999 for a Soap Opera Digest Awards at the 15th Soap Opera Digest Awards for Outstanding Villainess.

Jennings voiced Wanda Blake in the HBO adult animated superhero series, Todd McFarlane's Spawn from 1997 to 1999. Her other credits include the animated series The Zeta Project (2002), video games 50 Cent: Bulletproof (2005) and Tom Clancy's EndWar (2008), and animated film The Ice Age Adventures of Buck Wild (2022).

== Filmography ==
=== Film ===
Year	Title	Role	Notes
1990	Bad Influence	Woman at Tar Pit	
1990	Die Hard 2	WZDC Newscaster	
1994	A Low Down Dirty Shame	Funeral Guest	
1995	Seven	TV News Reporter	
2022	The Ice Age Adventures of Buck Wild	Ellie	Voice
2024	Mufasa: The Lion King	Sarafina	Voice

=== Television ===
Year	Title	Role	Notes
1991	Knots Landing	Reporter	Episode: "The Question Game"
1993	Living Single	Girl	Episode: "Full Court Press"
1995	Sketch Artist II: Hands That See	Todd	Television film
1995	Martin	Carla	Episode: "The Ex-Files"
1995	The Fresh Prince of Bel-Air	Therapist	Episode: "A Decent Proposal"
1995	Hang Time	Miss Desiree	Episode: "The Candidate"
1996	Baywatch Nights	Lea Jane Broussard	Episode: "Vengeance"
1996	The Wayans Bros.	Ina	Episode: "Goin' to the Net"
1997	Life with Roger	Linda	Episode: "The Boxer Rebellion"
1997–1999	Sunset Beach	Virginia Harrison	204 episodes
1997–1999	Todd McFarlane's Spawn	Wanda Blake	Voice, 18 episodes
1999	The Jamie Foxx Show	Karen	Episode: "Why Don't We Just Roll... Reversal"
1999	Angel	Mac	Episode: "Parting Gifts"
2001	Dead Last	Stewardass	Episode: "Death Is in the Air"
2002	That's Life	Receptionist	Episode: "What's Family Got to Do with It?"
2002	The Zeta Project	Agent Rush	Voice, 6 episodes
2003	44 Minutes: The North Hollywood Shoot-Out	News Anchor	Television film
2011	Body of Proof	Linda Gleason	Episode: "Your Number's Up"
2026	Irene's Kitchen	Irene	Voice; replacing Lucy Newman-Williams

=== Video game ===
Year	Title	Role	Notes
2005	50 Cent: Bulletproof	Alex	
