= Dax Griffin =

American actor

- Born: Dax S. Griffin; March 22, 1972 (age 53); Atlanta, Georgia
- Occupation: Actor
- Years active: 1997–present

Dax S. Griffin (born March 22, 1972) is an American actor. He is known for portraying younger Hank Pym in Ant-Man and its sequel Ant-Man and the Wasp.

== Career ==
Griffin is known for his role as Tim Truman on the NBC serial Sunset Beach from January 1997 until November 1999. He had one more appearance in the series finale in a dream sequence. He also played assistant district attorney Justin McCoy on All My Children in 2003.

Griffin joined the cast of The Bold and the Beautiful in the role of Shane McGrath on September 12, 2006. He left the show on April 20, 2007, when his character was killed off.

Griffin also played Albert Grabner in the TV commercial for the Japanese video game Front Mission: Gun Hazard, and is listed in the game's credits for that role.

Griffin made one appearance as "Bester" on Firefly, in a flashback, as Serenity's original engine mechanic. He has also made guest appearances on Charmed, CSI, and Drop Dead Diva.

== Personal life ==
Griffin was born in Atlanta, Georgia. He grew up in the Atlanta suburb of Marietta and graduated from Joseph Wheeler High School in 1990. In 1995, he graduated from the University of Alabama with a degree in business marketing.

He was in a relationship with actress Amelia Heinle (Victoria, The Young and the Restless) and was also involved with former The Bold and the Beautiful co-star Jennifer Gareis. As of 2008, he competed in local 10k runs.

== Filmography ==
Film roles
Year	Title	Role	Notes
1997	Men Seeking Women	Jimmy and the Gigolos Member	
1998	Dizzyland	Erickson	Short film
2001	Free	Skeet	
2011	The Change-Up	Blow Dried Goon	
2013	42	Racist City Island Fan	
2015	Ant-Man	Young Hank Pym	
2018	Ant-Man and the Wasp	Young Hank Pym	

Television roles
Year	Title	Role	Notes
1997–1999	Sunset Beach	Tim Truman	Main cast
1999	Brimstone	Wolfie	Episode: "Carrier"
1999	Pacific Blue	Nicky Vann	2 episodes
2000	Wonderland	Derek Wolf	1 episode
2000	Opposite Sex	Greg Tillman	3 episodes
2001	The Chronicle	Sam	Episode: "Here There Be Dragons"
2001	CSI: Crime Scene Investigation	Blond Man	Episode: "Organ Grinder"
2002	Firefly	Bester	Episode: "Out of Gas"
2003–2004	All My Children	Justin McCoy	6 episodes
2004	CSI: Miami	Doug Ramsey	Episode: "After the Fall"
2005	Charmed	Carl	Episode: "Death Becomes Them"
2006	Just Legal	Joe Chase	Episode: "The Heater"
2006–2007	The Bold and the Beautiful	Shane McGrath	Main cast
2007	CSI: NY	Steve Kaplan	Episode: "Commuted Sentences"
2009	Drop Dead Diva	Mac O'Brien	Episode: "Dead Model Walking"
2010	The Vampire Diaries	Bachelor #3	Episode: "A Few Good Men"
2010	Army Wives	Derrick	Episode: "New Orders"
2011	Justice for Natalee Holloway	Wouter	TV movie
2011	Single Ladies	Alex	2 episodes
2011	Partners	Derek	TV movie
2011	Criminal Behavior	Brian Hess	TV movie
2012	One Tree Hill	Wade Scolnik	3 episodes
2012	Hornet's Nest	Denny Raines	TV movie
2013	Revolution	Steve	Episode: "Home"
