= Tracy Melchior =

American actress (born 1970)

- Born: Tracy Ort; Hollywood, Florida
- Occupation(s): Actress, author, producer and activist
- Years active: 1996–present
- Spouse: Rob Melchior
- Children: 2
- Website: tracymelchior.com

Tracy Lindsey Melchior (born June 22, 1970) is an author and actress most known for playing the role of Kristen Forrester Dominguez on the CBS daytime drama The Bold and the Beautiful and Beverly Hills Cop III.

== Acting ==
Melchior was cast as the original Veronica Landers on The Young and the Restless from 1996 to 1997. In 1994, Melchior had a small role in Beverly Hills Cop III as the ticket booth lady who gives a ticket to Axel Foley (Eddie Murphy). In 1999, Melchior also had a main role in Sunset Beach as Tess Marin during March–December 1999. She was hired to play the role of Kristen Forrester on a contract basis from 2001 to 2003 and returned in several reprisal appearances between 2004 and 2017. In the fall of 2003 she briefly played the role of Kelly Cramer in the ABC daytime drama One Life to Live.

== Writing ==
Melchior's 2005 memoir Breaking the Perfect 10 details her acting career and effort to find salvation in Hollywood's male-dominated industry where malevolent and sexist behavior prevailed.

In an appearance on Larry King Live in 2005, the actress discussed her book, drawing attention to the often pernicious casting culture.

In 2017, following the launch of the #MeToo movement, the actress was invited to appear on a special episode of Hannity, where she recounted the experiences she wrote about in her book.

== Producer ==
Presented with opportunities to work behind-the-camera and advance social causes and community responsibility (including civil obedience initiatives), the actress launched a film company to inspire others to fostering social change.

== Personal life ==
Melchior and her husband, LAPD officer Rob Melchior, have two sons. The avid equestrian is an animal welfare advocate and a social justice activist. Her activism inspired her interest in pursuing film production.

Preceded by Gina Tognoni	Kelly Cramer on One Life to Live; July 2003-November 2003	Succeeded by Heather Tom
