= Eddie Cibrian =

American actor (born 1973)

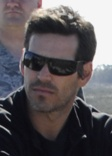
- Cibrian in 2009
- Born: Edward Carl Cibrian; June 16, 1973 (age 53); Burbank, California, U.S.
- Occupation: Actor
- Years active: 1993–present
- Spouses: Brandi Glanville (m. 2001; div. 2010) LeAnn Rimes (m. 2011)
- Children: 2

Edward Carl Cibrian (/ˈsɪbriən/ SIB-ree-ən; born June 16, 1973) is an American actor. He is best known for his roles as Cole Deschanel on the television series Sunset Beach and Jimmy Doherty on Third Watch.

His other notable television roles include Matt Clark in The Young and the Restless, Russell Varon in Invasion, Jesse Cardoza in CSI: Miami and Eddie Valetik in Take Two. Some of his best known films include the cult classic But I'm a Cheerleader and The Best Man Holiday.

== Early life and career ==
Cibrian, an only child, was born in Burbank, California. His mother, Hortensia (née Balaguer), is an office manager, and his father, Carl Cibrian, a banker. Both of Cibrian's parents are from Cuba. His father's family immigrated from Cuba to the United States after Fidel Castro came to power in 1959. His mother's family left Cuba about three years later. Cibrian's parents later met in California.

Cibrian starred in The Young and the Restless as Matt Clark, Baywatch Nights as Griff Walker, Sunset Beach as Cole Deschanel, CSI: Miami as Jesse Cardoza, Third Watch as womanizing New York City firefighter Jimmy Doherty, Tilt as rising poker star Eddie Towne, and Invasion as Everglades park ranger Russell Varon. He also guest-starred in Saved by the Bell: The College Years, Sabrina, the Teenage Witch, Criminal Minds, and Beverly Hills, 90210. His movie credits include Living Out Loud (1998), But I'm a Cheerleader (1999), and The Cave (2005).

In addition to acting, he sang in the soul-pop boy band 3Deep from 1998 to 2001, along with Young and The Restless costar and real-life best friend Joshua Morrow and Canadian singer CJ Huyer.

In 2006, Cibrian joined the cast of the Fox series Vanished midway through the season. The series was canceled after nine of the thirteen episodes produced were aired with subsequent episodes released via Myspace. The following year, he was cast as Jason Austin in the unaired pilot of Football Wives, the ABC remake of the British drama Footballers Wives.

Cibrian has had guest spots on Samantha Who?, Dirty Sexy Money, and Ugly Betty. In 2009, he joined the cast of CSI: Miami as an officer from the Hollywood division who joins Horatio's team in Miami. His contract was not picked up for the 2010–11 season.

In July 2010, Cibrian guest starred as a bounty hunter in multiple episodes of NBC's drama series Chase.

In March 2011, Cibrian was cast as the lead in the NBC pilot for The Playboy Club, a TV series set at the first Playboy Club in Chicago in 1963. In early October 2011, The Playboy Club was canceled by NBC after three episodes due to low ratings. In 2016, he was added to the cast of Rosewood as Capt. Ryan Slade. In 2018, he starred as the Private Investigator, Eddie Valetik, in Take Two on ABC.

== Personal life ==
In May 2001, Cibrian married Brandi Glanville, a former model and reality television star. Cibrian and Glanville have two sons, Mason and Jake. In 2006, Cibrian began an affair with former reality star, Scheana Shay from Vanderpump Rules. The couple announced their separation in July 2009 when it was revealed Cibrian had an affair with country music singer LeAnn Rimes, after they appeared together in the movie Northern Lights. Cibrian and Glanville's divorce was finalized on September 30, 2010.

On December 27, 2010, it was announced that Cibrian was engaged to Rimes. The couple wed on April 22, 2011, at a private home in California.

== Filmography ==
=== Film ===
Year	Title	Role	Notes
1998	Living Out Loud	The Masseur	
1999	But I'm a Cheerleader	Rock	
2000	In the Beginning	Joseph	
2001	Say It Isn't So	Jack Mitchelson	
2005	The Cave	Tyler McAllister	
2009	Not Easily Broken	Brock Houseman	
2009	Northern Lights	Nate Burns	
2010	Healing Hands aka Working Miracles	Buddy	
2012	Good Deeds	John	
2013	The Best Man Holiday	Brian McDonald	
2013	Playing Father	Clay Allen	
2014	The Single Moms Club	Santos	
2022	A Christmas Mystery	Sheriff Pierce	Streaming

=== Television ===
Year	Title	Role	Notes
1993	Saved by the Bell: The College Years	Janitor	Episode: "Screech Love"
1994	CBS Schoolbreak Special	Tough guy	1 episode
1994	The Bold and the Beautiful	Dave	1 episode
1994–1996	The Young and the Restless	Matt Clark	Regular role, 40 episodes
1996	Beverly Hills, 90210	Casey Watkins	Episode: "Here We Go Again"
1996	Sabrina, the Teenage Witch	Darryl and himself	2 episodes
1996–1997	Baywatch Nights	Griff Walker	Main role
1997–1999	Sunset Beach	Cole Deschanel/Cole St.John	Regular role, 497 episodes
1998	Sunset Beach: Shockwave	Cole Deschanel	Television film
1998	Logan's War: Bound by Honor	Logan Fallon	Television film
1999–2005	Third Watch	Jimmy Doherty	Main role
2000	In the Beginning	Joseph	Television film
2001	Citizen Baines	Curtis Daniel	Episode: "A Day Like No Other"
2003	The Street Lawyer	Michael Brock	Unaired pilot
2005	Tilt	Eddie Towne	Main role
2005–2006	Invasion	Russell Varon	Main role
2006	Vanished	Agent Daniel Lucas	Main role
2007	Football Wives	Jason Austin	Unaired pilot
2007	Criminal Minds	Joe Smith	Episode: "In Name and Blood"
2007	Dirty Sexy Money	Sebastian Fleet	Episode: "The Game"
2007	Samantha Who?	Kevin	Episodes: "The Hockey Date" and "The Break Up"
2008	Ugly Betty	Coach Diaz	Recurring role, 7 episodes
2008	The Starter Wife	Detective Eddie La Roche	3 episodes
2009	Northern Lights	Nate Burns	Television film
2009	In the Beginning - The Complete Miniseries	Joseph	Television film
2009	Washington Field	SA Tommy Diaz	Television pilot
2009–2010	CSI: Miami	CSI Detective Jesse Cardoza	Main role (season 8)
2010	Healing Hands	Buddy Hoyt	Television film
2010–2011	Chase	Ben Crowley	3 episodes
2011	The Playboy Club	Nick Dalton	6 episodes
2012	Rizzoli & Isles	Dennis Rockmond	Episodes: 2 episodes
2012–2013	For Better or Worse	Chris	8 episodes
2012	Hot in Cleveland	Sean	2 episodes
2013	Notes from Dad	Clay Allen	Television film
2014	LeAnn & Eddie	Himself	Reality series
2015–2016	Baby Daddy	Ross	5 episodes
2016–2017	Rosewood	Ryan Slade	Main role (season 2)
2018	Take Two	Eddie Valetik	Main role
2021	Country Comfort	Beau	Main role
2022	Fallen Angels Murder Club: Friends to Die For	Avery Mitchell	TV movie
2022–2023	Home Economics	Santiago	3 episodes
2025	Love, Death & Robots	Chalon	Voice; Episode: "The Screaming of the Tyrannosaur"
2025	All's Fair	Arthur McPherson	Episode: "When We Were Young"
2026	High Potential	Mayor Callo	Episode: "Second Sunday"

== Award nominations ==
Year	Award	Category	Work	Result
1998	Soap Opera Digest Awards	Outstanding Younger Leading Actor	Sunset Beach	Nominated
1999	Soap Opera Digest Awards	Hottest Male Star	Sunset Beach	Nominated
2000	ALMA Award	Emerging Actor in a Drama Series	Third Watch	Nominated
2002	ALMA Award	Outstanding Actor in a Television Series	Third Watch	Nominated
