= Kathleen Noone =

American actress (born 1945)

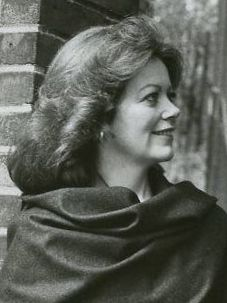
- Kathleen Noone in All My Children (1977)
- Born: Kathleen O'Meara; January 8, 1945 (age 81); Hillsdale, New Jersey, U.S.
- Education: Southern Methodist University (MFA)
- Occupation: Actress
- Years active: 1965–present
- Spouse: Bill Noone (m. 1967; div. 1976)
- Website: www.kathleennoone.com

Kathleen Noone (née O'Meara; born January 8, 1945) is an American actress. She began her career as a singer in nightclubs and performed in musicals off-Broadway before making her television debut in the CBS daytime soap opera, As the World Turns (1975–1976).

From 1977 to 1989, Noone played Ellen Shepherd Dalton on the ABC daytime soap opera, All My Children. For this role, she won Daytime Emmy Award for Outstanding Supporting Actress in a Drama Series in 1987. In 1990, Noone moved to prime time, starring as villainous Claudia Whittaker in the CBS series, Knots Landing (1990–1993). She returned to daytime television as Bette Katzenkazrahi on NBC's Sunset Beach (1997–1999), for which she received another Daytime Emmy Award nomination. She has had recurring roles on L.A. Law, Party of Five, According to Jim, and Dexter.

== Early life and education ==
Noone was born in Hillsdale, New Jersey to a professional baseball player father. She graduated from University of Miami and Southern Methodist University with a Master of Fine Arts degree, and the following years performed on off-Broadway stage. She co-founded member of the Scott Repertory Theatre, the Globe Theatre in Texas, and the Colonnaides Theatre in New York City, where she co-produced and developed plays with Michael Lessac.

== Career ==
=== 1975–1989 ===
Noone has made her screen debut playing Margaret Porter in the CBS daytime soap opera As the World Turns from 1975 to 1976. In 1977, she was cast as recently divorced Ellen Shepherd on the ABC daytime soap opera, All My Children, a role she played from 1977 to 1989. Her character was counter to the naughty Erica Kane (Susan Lucci). In 1987, she won the Daytime Emmy Award for Outstanding Supporting Actress in a Drama Series after nomination in 1980 in same category. She also received three Soap Opera Digest Awards nominations.

=== 1990–1999 ===
After leaving All My Children, Noone, in her early 40s, moved from New York to Los Angeles for a career in Hollywood. After guest starring roles on Quantum Leap and Empty Nest, in 1990 Noone, was asked to play the new character of Claudia Whittaker, elder sister of Greg Sumner (William Devane) in the CBS primetime drama Knots Landing. She played the role from 1990 until the show was ended in 1993. Noone's character became an antagonist for the last three seasons after Donna Mills's leaving in 1989. In 1992, Noone received Soap Opera Digest Award nomination for Outstanding Actress: Prime Time for her performance as Claudia.

During the 1990s, Noone appeared in a number of television series, movies, and specials. She guest-starred in an episode of the NBC sitcom Frasier, playing the role of Aunt Patrice in 1993. That same year she was a guest judge at Miss Teen USA 1993 held in Biloxi, Mississippi. She had recurring roles on L.A. Law and Party of Five, and guest starred on Ned and Stacey, Beverly Hills, 90210, and Ellen. She had a supporting role in the 1996 comedy film Citizen Ruth starring Laura Dern and Swoosie Kurtz.

In 1997, Noone returned to daytime television playing gossip columnist Bette Katzenkazrahi on the NBC series Sunset Beach, produced by Aaron Spelling. The series aired only three years, Noone signed a new contract with the serial in August 1999, she also incorrectly predicted that Sunset Beach would not be axed by NBC. In 1998 and 1999, for her portrayal of Bette, Noone was nominated in the category of "Female Scene Stealer" at the Soap Opera Digest Awards. In 1999, she was nominated for a Daytime Emmy Award for Outstanding Supporting Actress in a Drama Series.

=== 2000–present ===
Noone has had guest starring roles on Any Day Now, Sabrina, the Teenage Witch, Supernatural, and The Unit. From 2001 to 2005, she had the recurring role of Courtney Thorne-Smith's mother in the ABC sitcom According to Jim. From 2002 to 2008, she also played the role of Edna Wallace on the NBC soap opera, Passions. She joined the show in June 2002 and, after her storyline dried up, the actress was bumped to recurring status in 2005, but she continued making recurring appearances on the show until its end in August 2008.

In 2010, Noone had the recurring role in the Showtime drama series, Dexter playing Maura Bennett. She also appeared in two episodes on Showtime comedy-drama United States of Tara in 2010. She also has appeared in the 2011 independent comedy film About Fifty starring Wendie Malick. Noone also is a member of the Playwrights Kitchen Ensemble at the Coronet Theatre in Los Angeles.

== Personal life ==
Noone was married to Bill Noone for nine years beginning in 1967. The couple divorced in 1976 but Noone kept her married name as her professional name.

== Filmography ==
| Year | Title | Role | Notes |
|---|---|---|---|
| 1975–1976 | As the World Turns | Margaret Porter | Series regular |
| 1977-1989,1995 | All My Children | Ellen Shepherd Dalton | Series regular |
| 1988 | Kate & Allie | Phyllis Kincaid | Episode: "Inside Park Avenue" |
| 1989 | Quantum Leap | Sadie Cotter | Episode: "So Help Me God - July 29, 1957" |
| 1990 | Empty Nest | Cookie | Episode: "Harry's Choice" |
| 1990 | Hunter | Mrs. Julia Linder | Episode: "Mrs. Julia Linder" |
| 1990–1993 | Knots Landing | Claudia Whittaker | Series regular, 67 episodes |
| 1993 | Frasier | Aunt Patrice | Episode: "Here's Looking at You" |
| 1993 | A Song for You | Mrs. O'Brien | |
| 1993–1994 | L.A. Law | Fran Hendrickson | Recurring role, 4 episodes |
| 1994 | Love & War | Mrs. Carlisle | Episode: "Slaughter on Tenth Avenue" |
| 1995 | Ned and Stacey | Patrice Nolan | Episode: "Portrait of a Marriage" |
| 1995–1999 | Party of Five | Ellie Bennett | Recurring role, 6 episodes |
| 1996 | Serpent's Lair | Betty | |
| 1996 | Citizen Ruth | Pat | |
| 1996 | Beverly Hills, 90210 | Ruth Keats | Episode: "Leap of Faith" |
| 1996 | The Faculty | Mary Driscoll | Episode: "Parents' Night" |
| 1996 | Hearts Adrift | Grace Deerfield | |
| 1996 | What Love Sees | Sarah Treadway | |
| 1996 | Kirk | Marylee Waters | Episodes: "Oh, What a Tangled Web We Weave: Part 1" and "Oh, What a Tangled Web We Weave: Part 2" |
| 1997 | Skeletons | Sadie | |
| 1996–1998 | Ellen | Ferne Kovak | Episodes: "Kiss My Bum"" and "Vows" |
| 1997–1999 | Sunset Beach | Bette Katzenkazrahi | Series regular |
| 1999 | Cold Feet | Stella Lombardi | Episodes: "An Affair to Dismember" and "I've Got a Crush on You, Frigidaire" |
| 1999 | Diagnosis Murder | Jesse’s Mom | Episode: "The Mouth That Roared" |
| 2001 | Any Day Now | Muriel Maples | Episode: "Blinded by the White" |
| 2001–2005 | According to Jim | Maggie | Recurring role, 5 episodes |
| 2002 | Sabrina, the Teenage Witch | Francesca Flaum | Episode: "Sabrina and the Kiss" |
| 2002–2008 | Passions | Edna Wallace | Series regular (2003-2004), recurring (2002–03, 2004–08) |
| 2006 | Supernatural | Mrs. Robinson | Episode: "Route 666" |
| 2006 | The War at Home | Aunt Shelley | Episode: "Looney Tunes" |
| 2006 | The Unit | Kathryn | Episode: "Eating the Young" |
| 2007 | Safe Harbour | Louis Anderson | |
| 2008 | You Don't Mess with the Zohan | Second Woman in Cab | |
| 2008 | General Hospital: Night Shift | Patricia Julian | Episode: "Brothers & Sisters" |
| 2010 | United States of Tara | Mimi | Episodes: "You Becoming You" and "To Have and to Hold" |
| 2010 | Dexter | Maura Bennett | Recurring role, 3 episodes |
| 2011 | About Fifty | Peggy | |
| 2014 | Faking It | Nana | Episode: "Burnt Toast" |
| 2017 | A Neighbor's Deception | Abagail | |

== Awards and nominations ==
- 1980 Daytime Emmy Award for Outstanding Lead Actress in a Drama Series (All My Children) Nomination
- 1986 Soap Opera Digest Award for Outstanding Actress in a Supporting Role on a Daytime Serial (All My Children) Nomination
- 1987 Daytime Emmy Award for Outstanding Supporting Actress in a Drama Series (All My Children) Win
- 1988 Soap Opera Digest Award for Outstanding Actress in a Supporting Role: Daytime (All My Children) Nomination
- 1989 Soap Opera Digest Award for Outstanding Actress in a Supporting Role: Daytime (All My Children) Nomination
- 1992 Soap Opera Digest Award for Outstanding Actress: Prime Time (Knots Landing) Nomination
- 1998 Soap Opera Digest Award for Outstanding Female Scene Stealer (Sunset Beach) Nomination
- 1999 Daytime Emmy Award for Outstanding Supporting Actress in a Drama Series (Sunset Beach) Nomination
- 1999 Soap Opera Digest Award for Outstanding Female Scene Stealer (Sunset Beach) Nomination
