= Sam Behrens =

American actor (born 1950)

- Born: Stanley Birnbaum; July 24, 1950 (age 76); New York City, U.S.
- Occupation: Actor
- Years active: 1979–present
- Spouse: Shari Belafonte (m. 1989)

Sam Behrens (born Stanley Birnbaum; July 24, 1950) is an American actor. He is known for his roles as Jake Meyer on the ABC daytime soap opera General Hospital, Danny Waleska in the CBS prime time soap opera Knots Landing and as Gregory Richards in the NBC daytime soap opera, Sunset Beach.

== Life and career ==
Behrens was born Stanley Birnbaum to a Jewish family in Brooklyn, New York City. He is of German ancestry on his paternal side. He has been married to Shari Belafonte since December 31, 1989.

Behrens began his soap opera career on ABC's Ryan's Hope, playing Dr. Adam Cohen from 1979 to 1980. In the 1980s, he moved from New York to Los Angeles, when he was cast as Jake Meyer on General Hospital from 1983 to 1987. After a recurring role on the NBC legal drama series, L.A. Law, Behrens was cast as Danny Waleska, Valene Ewing's (Joan Van Ark) new husband. He won the Soap Opera Digest Award for Outstanding Villain: Prime Time for this role in 1991. Behrens also guest-starred on The Facts of Life and Murder, She Wrote, and played major roles in a number of made-for-television movies in the early 1990s. He also had a recurring role in the ABC drama series, Homefront in 1993. In film, Behrens had supporting parts in American Blue Note (1989), and Alive (1993).

From 1997 to 1999, Behrens starred alongside Lesley-Anne Down and other actors in the NBC daytime soap opera Sunset Beach produced by Aaron Spelling. He received two additional nominations for Soap Opera Digest Award for Outstanding Villain: Daytime.

== Filmography ==
Year	Title	Role	Notes
1979—1980	Ryan's Hope	Dr. Adam Cohen	Series regular
1983	Star 80	Businessman	Uncredited
1983—1987	General Hospital	Jake Meyer	Series regular
1988	L.A. Law	Charles Craft	3 episodes
1988	The Facts of Life	Wes Mitchell	2 episodes
1988	Murder, She Wrote	Kevin Styles	Episode: "J.B.. as in Jailbird"
1989	American Blue Note	Nat Joy	
1989—1990	Knots Landing	Danny Waleska	36 episodes Soap Opera Digest Award for Outstanding Villain: Prime Time (1991)
1990	Unspeakable Acts	Herschell	Television film
1990	Uncut Gem	Lewis	Television film
1990	Murder by Numbers	Lee	
1991	Murder, She Wrote	Steve Lockner	Episode: "Unauthorized Obituary"
1991	And You Thought Your Parents Were Weird	Steve Franklin	
1992	Beyond Reality	The Man	Episode: "Dancing with the Man"
1993	Alive	Javier Methol	
1993	Homefront	Phil Havel	4 episodes
1994	Viper	Frederick Lang	Episode: "Past Tense"
1994	Shadow of Obsession	Philip	Television film
1995	Tummy	Richard Power	
1996	Bermuda Triangle	John	Television film
1997—1999	Sunset Beach	Gregory Richards; Tobias Richards	Series regular Nominated — Soap Opera Digest Award for Outstanding Villain (1997—1999)
2002	That's Life	Robert Comiskey	Episode: "Baum's Thesis"
2002	The Young and the Restless	Maxwell Hollister	Recurring role
2007	The Closer	Ken Scott	Episode: "Lovers Leap"
2017	Confessions of a Teenage Jesus Jerk	Elder	
2019	Gloria Bell	Man #1	
