= E. Duke Vincent =

American television producer (1932–2024)

- Born: Edward Ventimiglia; April 30, 1932; Jersey City, New Jersey, U.S.
- Died: February 10, 2024 (aged 91); Montecito, California, U.S.
- Occupations: Television producer, writer
- Years active: 1967–2006
- Spouses: Sandra Carol Freeman (m. 1960; div. 1974) Dian Parkinson (m. 1977; div. 1982) Pamela Hensley (m. 1982)
- Children: 2

E. Duke Vincent (born Edward Ventimiglia, April 30, 1932 – February 10, 2024) was an American television producer. He was a former producing partner of Aaron Spelling and an executive at various Spelling production company entities. Vincent, a 1960–61 naval aviator who was a member of the famed Blue Angels flying team, had a 40-year career in television writing and production, involving 2300 hours of television.

Television series in which Vincent participated include Dynasty; Charmed; Melrose Place; Beverly Hills, 90210; 7th Heaven; Wanted; Vegas; Matt Houston; Charlie's Angels; The San Pedro Beach Bums; Sunset Beach; Savannah and many others. Since 2006, Vincent primarily was engaged in writing novels, which often involved the entertainment industry. His first novel, Mafia Summer, is a fictionalization of factual organized crime.

Vincent was educated at Seton Hall University, from which he received a B.A. in 1954. He latterly resided in Montecito, California, with his wife, actress Pamela Hensley. E. Duke Vincent died at home in Montecito on February 10, 2024, at the age of 91.

== Filmography ==
- The San Pedro Beach Bums (1977)
- Vega$ (1978–1981)
- Dynasty (1981–1989)
- Matt Houston (1982–1985)
- Hotel (1983–1988)
- Life with Lucy (1986)
- 2000 Malibu Road (1992)
- Melrose Place (1992–1999)
- Winnetka Road (1994)
- Burke's Law (1994–1995)
- Models Inc. (1994–1995)
- Robin's Hoods (1994–1995)
- Madman of the People (1994–1995)
- University Hospital (1995)
- Beverly Hills, 90210 (1995–2000)
- Malibu Shores (1996)
- Savannah (1996–1997)
- 7th Heaven (1996–2006)
- Sunset Beach (1997–1999)
- Charmed (1998–2006)
- Safe Harbor (1999)
- Titans (2000–2001)
- Kingpin (2003)
- Clubhouse (2004–2005)
- Summerland (2004–2005)
- Wanted (2005)

== Novels ==
- Mafia Summer. Bloomsbury USA, 2006. ISBN 1-59691-113-1
- Black Widow. Bloomsbury USA, 2007. ISBN 1-59691-390-8
- The Strip. Bloomsbury USA, 2008. ISBN 1-59691-615-X
- The Camelot Conspiracy: A Novel of the Kennedys, Castro and the CIA ISBN 1590206398
