= Gary Tomlin =

American producer, director and actor

Gary Tomlin is an American soap opera actor, writer, producer and director.

== Career ==
Tomlin's career on daytime serials began in 1973 when he was cast on CBS's Search for Tomorrow as Bruce Carson. He also made a guest appearance on "The Nightwalker" episode of The Waltons (1976). He later appeared as Morgan Simpson on the NBC soap opera Another World in 1979. Both series were produced in New York City by Procter and Gamble Productions.

Tomlin served as the co-head writer of NBC's Days of Our Lives, which tapes in Los Angeles, from 1980 to 1981. He then returned to New York as the head writer for Another World from 1984 to 1985 (at times sharing the position with others). Tomlin next wrote scripts for the Los Angeles serial Santa Barbara (NBC) from 1987 to 1990.

At the same time, Tomlin directed episodes of Another World from 1987 to 1991, later directing on ABC's One Life to Live from 1992 to 1995.

Tomlin became a producer in New York for All My Children from 1995 to 1996, next rising to Executive Producer for the Los Angeles-based NBC serial Sunset Beach from its debut in 1997 until its cancellation in 1999. He also directed episodes of the series during its run. Following Sunset Beach, Tomlin directed episodes of NBC's new series Passions in Los Angeles from 2000 until he was hired by ABC as the new Executive Producer of One Life To Live in January 2001, replacing Jill Farren Phelps. He also directed episodes of One Life to Live during his stint there.

Tomlin's time at One Life to Live saw the return of 1980s villains Allison Perkins and Mitch Laurence in a storyline creating a secret history for events from 1986 and 1987, as well as a renewal of the on-again, off-again multiple personality storyline of character Victoria Lord, as played by multiple Emmy-winning actress Erika Slezak. The series won its first and only Daytime Emmy Award for Outstanding Drama Series for the 2001–2002 season. In late 2002, ABC announced that it was replacing Tomlin with Frank Valentini.

Tomlin returned to directing Passions in 2003, leaving in December 2007 and replacing Ron Carlivati as head writer of One Life to Live during the 2007–2008 Writers Guild of America strike. Tomlin, formerly a member of Writers Guild of America West himself, left and maintained financial core status during the strike.

Tomlin served as co-executive producer on Days of Our Lives from 2008 to 2011, and in April 2012 was named co-head writer with Christopher Whitesell. Tomlin left Days of Our Lives in August 2015, and since 2016 has been a director at General Hospital.

== Positions held ==
All My Children

- Producer (April 24, 1995– April 16, 1996)

Another World

- Actor: Morgon Simpson (1979)
- Associate head writer (1984)
- Co-head writer (July 2, 1984 – January 4, 1985)
- Head writer (January 7-31, 1985)
- Director (1987–1991)

Days of Our Lives

- Head writer (with Michelle Poteet Lisanti; October 20, 1980 – October 20, 1981)
- Co-executive producer (hired by Ken Corday; September 17, 2008 – September 2, 2011)
- Co-head writer (with Christopher Whitesell; hired by Ken Corday; August 17, 2012 – August 18, 2015)

General Hospital

- Director (November 15, 2016 – present)

One Life to Live

- Director (1992–1995; 2001–2003)
- Executive producer (January 2001 to February 2003)
- Script writer (December 2007 – February 2008; May 2008 – 2008)
- Head writer (February 15, 2008 – May 1, 2008)

Passions

- Director (2000–2001; April 2003 – December 2007)

Santa Barbara

- Script Writer (1987–1990)

Search for Tomorrow

- Actor: Bruce Carson (#3) (1973–1974)
- Head writer (1982–1984; 1985–1986)

Sunset Beach

- Executive producer (entire run, 1997–1999)
- Director (entire run, 1997–1999)

Texas

- Writer

== Awards and nominations ==
- Daytime Emmy: Win (2002; Best Drama; One Life To Live)
- Daytime Emmy: Nomination (2001; Best Directing; Passions)
- Daytime Emmy: Nomination (1995; Best Directing; One Life To Live)
- Directors Guild of America: Nomination (2001; One Life To Live)
