= Steelback =

Steelback could refer to:

- Steelback Brewery, a Canadian microbrewery in Tiverton, Ontario
- Steelback Centre, former name of the Essar Centre, a sports and entertainment facility in Sault Ste. Marie, Ontario
- 3rd Battalion, Royal Anglian Regiment, nicknamed "The Steelbacks"
- Northants Steelbacks, a cricket team in Northamptonshire, UK
