= Laurie Fortier =

American actress

- Born: 1973 or 1974 (age 51–52); Pasadena, California, U.S.
- Occupation: Actress
- Years active: 1993–present

Laurie Fortier (born c. 1974) is an American actress. She is known for her television work on Running the Halls, Push and Hemlock Grove, and for her film work in To Gillian on Her 37th Birthday and The In Crowd.

== Career ==
Fortier made her debut in the NBC teen comedy series Running the Halls in 1993, playing Holiday Friedman, one of the lead roles. In 1998, she was one of the leads on ABC's short-lived drama/soap opera Push, playing gymnast and Olympic hopeful Cara Bradford.

Fortier appeared in the film To Gillian on Her 37th Birthday in 1996, playing the role of Cindy, the flirtatious best friend of Claire Danes' character. In 2000, she appeared in the comedy film Dean Quixote as Annie. The same year, Fortier also appeared in the thriller film The In Crowd playing the role of Kelly who has a crush on the lead character, Brittany, played by Susan Ward; Fortier's portrayal elicited mildly positive notice from The New York Times reviewer Elvis Mitchell.

In 2013, Fortier joined the cast of the Netflix supernatural drama Hemlock Grove, playing the role of Marie Godfrey, one of the series' mortal characters.

== Personal life ==
Fortier was born and raised in Pasadena, California. She is of Italian descent. She was selected to be a Rose Princess in the 103rd Tournament of Roses Parade, which took place on January 1, 1992. She briefly studied at Saint Mary's College in Moraga, California, before moving to Los Angeles to pursue her acting career. Fortier is married and has two children.

== Filmography ==
Film roles
Year	Title	Role	Notes
1996	To Gillian on Her 37th Birthday	Cindy Bayles	
2000	Dean Quixote	Annie	
2000	The In Crowd	Kelly	
2006	Surveillance	Claire	
2007	Stories USA	Bunny	Segment: "Club Soda"
2015	No Deposit	Angie Vanenti	
2016	A New York Christmas	Shannon	Post-production
2016	The Red Maple Leaf	Margaret Adams	
2017	The Neighborhood	Angela D'Amico	

Television roles
Year	Title	Role	Notes
1993	Running the Halls	Holiday Friedman	Main role, 13 episodes
1995	Boy Meets World	Jasmine	Episodes: "On the Air", "Pop Quiz"
1995	Kirk	Megan	Episode: "Night at the Movies"
1996	Sliders	Nicky	Episode: "Rules of the Game"
1996	Her Costly Affair	Liz	Television movie (NBC)
1997	The Big Easy	Nikki Tilling	Episode: "Long and Short"
1998	Push	Cara Bradford	Main role, 8 episodes (3 aired, 5 unaired)
1998	Chicago Hope	Prostitute Double	Episode: "The Other Cheek"
1999	Cupid	Model	Episode: "A Great Personality"
1999	V.I.P.	Cynthia Murdoch	Episode: "Escape from Val-catraz"
2000	Rocky Times	Lynn	Unsold television pilot
2002	CSI: Crime Scene Investigation	Janine Wood	Episode: "Let the Seller Beware"
2005	CSI: Miami	Halle Lockhart / Halle Webber	Episode: "One Night Stand"
2005	E-Ring	Dr. Valerie Levin	Episode: "Breath of Allah"; uncredited
2005	CSI: Crime Scene Investigation	Nancy	Episode: "A Bullet Runs Through It: Part 1"
2007	House M.D.	Darnell	Episode: "Ugly"
2010	CSI: Crime Scene Investigation	Carrie Jones	Episode: "Sqweegel"
2011	No Ordinary Family	Melissa Rainey	Episode: "No Ordinary Powell"
2011	CSI: NY	Old Man	Episode: "Identity Crisis"
2012	Perception	Dr. Elaine Steinman	Episode: "Cipher"
2013	Franklin & Bash	Allison Burien	Episode: "Coffee and Cream"
2013–2014	Hemlock Grove	Marie Godfrey	Recurring role, 13 episodes
2014	Hawaii Five-0	Bridgette Anderson	Episode: "O kela me keia manawa"
2014	Castle	U.S. Attorney Stephanie Goldmark	Episode: "The Greater Good"
2014	Rush	Molly Wilcox	Episode: "Because I Got High"
2014	Stalker	Stella	Episode: "Tell All"
2016	Game of Silence	Tammy	Episodes: "Ghosts of Quitman", "Into the Black"
2017	Fatal Defense	Gwen Walsh	Television movie (Lifetime)
2018	Unsolved	Donna Kading	Recurring role, 5 episodes
2018	Zombie at 17	Kate Scott	Television movie (Lifetime)
2019	In Bed With a Killer	Beth	Television movie (Lifetime)
2020	Into The Arms of Danger	Laura	Television movie (Lifetime)
2021	The Walking Dead	Agatha	Recurring role, 4 episodes
2021	9-1-1	Savanna Richards	Episode: "Brawl in Cell Block 9-1-1"
2022	What the Nanny Saw	Caroline	Television movie (Lifetime)
