= Robert Loggia =

American actor (1930–2015)

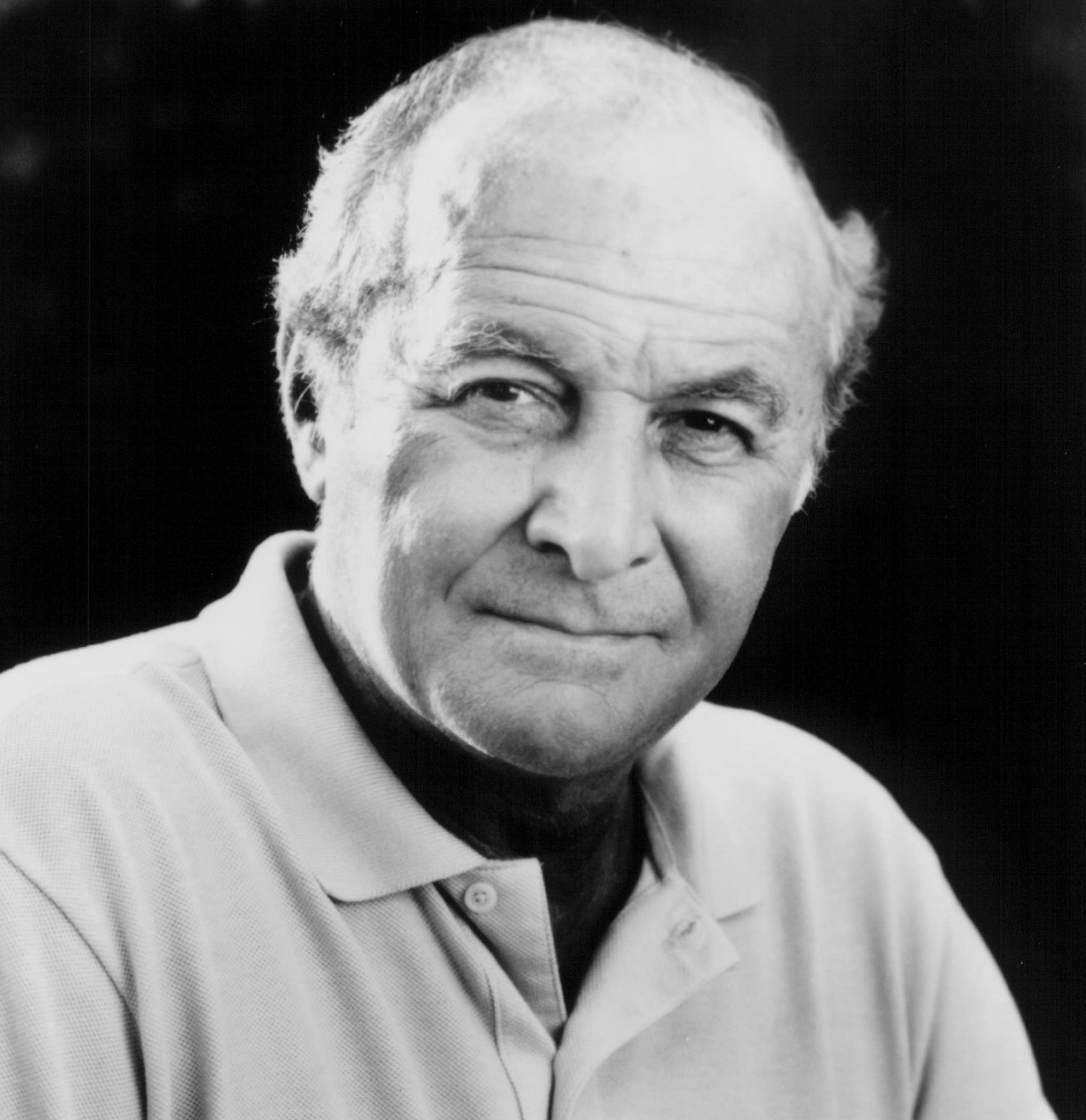
- Loggia in 1983
- Born: Salvatore Loggia; January 3, 1930; Staten Island, New York, U.S.
- Died: December 4, 2015 (aged 85); Los Angeles, California, U.S.
- Resting place: Westwood Memorial Park
- Education: University of Missouri (BA)
- Occupation: Actor
- Years active: 1951–2015
- Spouses: Marjorie Sloan (m. 1954; div. 1981) Audrey O'Brien (m. 1982)
- Children: 3
- Relatives: James LeGros (son-in-law)
- Awards: Saturn Award (1988); Ellis Island Medal of Honor (2010)

Salvatore Loggia (/ˈloʊʒə/ LOH-zhə, Italian: [salvaˈtoːre ˈlɔddʒa]; January 3, 1930 – December 4, 2015), known professionally as Robert Loggia, was an American actor. He was nominated for the Academy Award for Best Supporting Actor for Jagged Edge (1985) and won the Saturn Award for Best Supporting Actor for Big (1988). In a career spanning over 60 years, Loggia performed in many films, including The Greatest Story Ever Told (1965), three Pink Panther films, An Officer and a Gentleman (1982), Scarface (1983), Prizzi's Honor (1985), Oliver & Company (1988), Innocent Blood (1992), Independence Day (1996), Lost Highway (1997), Return to Me (2000), and Tim and Eric's Billion Dollar Movie (2012). He also appeared on numerous television series, including Malcolm in the Middle (2001), The Sopranos (2004), and Men of a Certain Age (2011), and played lead roles, such as Thomas Hewitt Edward Cat in T.H.E. Cat (1966–1967), Nick Mancuso in Mancuso, F.B.I. (1989–1990), and Elfego Baca in the Walt Disney limited series The Nine Lives of Elfego Baca (1958–1960).

== Early life and education ==
Loggia was born in Staten Island, New York on January 3, 1930, to Biagio Loggia, a shoemaker born in Palma di Montechiaro, Sicily and Elena Blandino, a homemaker born in Vittoria, Sicily. He grew up in the Little Italy neighborhood, where the family spoke Italian at home. He graduated from New Dorp High School in Staten Island before taking courses at Wagner College in the city, where he joined the Alpha Sigma Phi fraternity.

In 1951, Robert Loggia earned a degree in journalism from the University of Missouri in Columbia. He later studied acting with Alvina Krause at Northwestern University in Evanston, Illinois. After serving as a reporter in the United States Army for the Armed Forces Radio and Television Service in the Caribbean, Loggia started his acting career at the Actors Studio, studying under Stella Adler.

== Career ==
Loggia's stage roles include Solyony in The Three Sisters (1964) and as Al in Boom Boom Room (1973). He had an uncredited appearance in Somebody Up There Likes Me (1956); when he was cast as a New Mexico lawman Elfego Baca in 1958 his career began. He was a radio and TV anchor on the Southern Command Network in the Panama Canal Zone, and Loggia garnered attention by playing a real life sheriff in The Nine Lives of Elfego Baca, a series of Walt Disney TV shows.

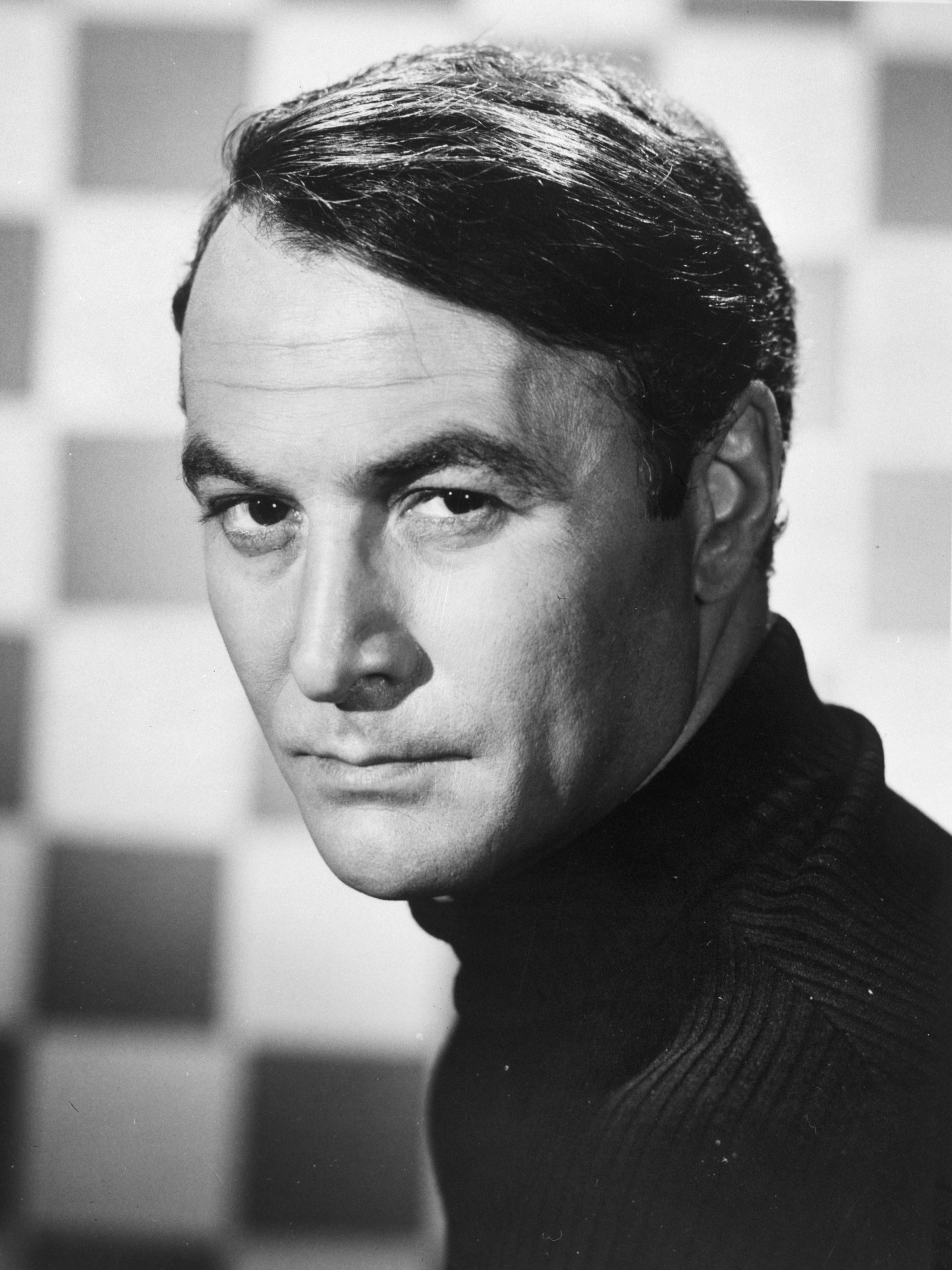
Loggia in T.H.E. Cat, 1966

Loggia later starred as the proverbial cat-burglar-turned-good circus artist Thomas Hewitt Edward Cat in a short-lived detective series called T.H.E. Cat, first broadcast in 1966. T.H.E. Cat initially appeared to be a success, and Loggia said: "We're drawing about a 30 percent share of the audience, which NBC considers fine for a new show with a new star." After NBC canceled the series when viewing figures failed to deliver, he went into a mid-life crisis—a "Dante-esque descent into the inferno", as he called it later. For six years, Loggia's career foundered, and his marriage fell apart. Restless and unnerved, constantly riddled with self-doubt, a chance meeting with Audrey O'Brien was his saving grace. She helped Loggia out of the crisis, and they later married. Despite playing Frank Carver on the CBS soap opera The Secret Storm in 1972, he took a new course when he decided to begin a career in directing.

Director Blake Edwards often cast Loggia in his films in minor or supporting roles including Revenge of the Pink Panther (1978), other Pink Panther sequels, and S.O.B. (1981), a satire about Hollywood. In 1983, Loggia played Frank Lopez, a drug dealer who was one of the main supporting characters and antagonists in the film Scarface, which is often considered a classic Hollywood film. Loggia also acted in several widely acclaimed films such as An Officer and a Gentleman (1982), Prizzi's Honor (1985), and Independence Day (1996). He also appeared in the movie "Big" in 1988 , which was an American fantasy comedy film directed by Penny Marshall and starring Tom Hanks as Josh Baskin, an adolescent boy whose wish to be "big" transforms him physically into an adult. Robert Loggia and Tom Hanks famously played an oversized floor piano keyboard with their feet in the FAO Schwartz toy store. Other films starring Loggia include Over The Top (1987), Necessary Roughness (1991), and Return to Me (2000).

Loggia was nominated for the Academy Award for Best Supporting Actor for his portrayal of crusty private detective Sam Ransom in the crime thriller Jagged Edge (1985). He was nominated for the Primetime Emmy Award for Outstanding Lead Actor in a Drama Series, his first such honor, for portraying FBI agent Nick Mancuso in the TV series Mancuso, FBI (1989–1990), a follow-up to the previous year's miniseries Favorite Son (1988). Loggia appeared as a mobster in multiple films, including Bill Sykes, the immoral loanshark and shipyard agent in Disney's animated film Oliver & Company (1988), Salvatore "The Shark" Macelli in John Landis' Innocent Blood (1992), Mr. Eddy in David Lynch's Lost Highway (1997), and Don Vito Leoni in David Jablin's The Don's Analyst (1997). He also played violent mobster Feech La Manna in several episodes of The Sopranos.

In 1998, Loggia appeared in a television commercial lampooning obscure celebrity endorsements. In it, a young boy names Loggia as someone he would trust to recommend Minute Maid orange-tangerine blend. Loggia instantly appears and endorses the drink, to which the boy exclaims, "Whoa, Robert Loggia!" The commercial was later referenced in a Malcolm in the Middle episode in which Loggia made a guest appearance as "Grandpa Victor" (for which he received a second Emmy nomination); in it, Loggia drinks orange juice, spits it out, and complains about the presence of pulp. In addition to voicing Sykes in Disney's Oliver & Company, Loggia had several more voice acting roles in multiple media, including: Admiral Petrarch in the computer game FreeSpace 2 (1999) and the anime movie The Dog of Flanders (1997), crooked cop Ray Machowski in Grand Theft Auto III, a 2001 video game, and a recurring role on the Adult Swim animated TV comedy series Tom Goes to the Mayor (2004–2006).

In August 2009, Loggia appeared in one of Apple's Get a Mac advertisements. The advertisement features him as a personal trainer hired by PC to get him back on top of his game. On October 26, 2009, TVGuide.com announced Loggia had joined the cast of the TNT series Men of a Certain Age.

Loggia appeared in two episodes of the animated series Family Guy as himself; in the episode "Brothers and Sisters", after Mayor West tells his fiancé Carol he has "aides" (which Carol mistakes for AIDS), before he clarifies that he is referring to his assistants; West then remarks that they both have AIDS, and the scene cuts to Loggia, angrily responding "Not Okay!". In the episode "Call Girl", he is seen twice denoting the passage of time in boring events. The script cuts away to Loggia saying "Eight __ hours later", then back to the story, further along in the plot. An earlier episode showed Peter stuck behind Loggia at the airport, where he was not voiced by Loggia himself. In 2012, Loggia portrayed Saint Peter during his final imprisonment in The Apostle Peter and the Last Supper. He partnered with Frank D'Angelo, an entrepreneur from Toronto in 2013, appearing in three films (Real Gangsters, The Big Fat Stone, and No Depo$it), with a fourth film in production (Sicilian Vampire) at the time of Loggia's death. Loggia served as a director for episodes of Quincy, M.E., Magnum, P.I., and Hart to Hart.

Loggia reprised his role from Independence Day, General William Grey, in a cameo appearance alongside his wife, Audrey, in the 2016 sequel Independence Day: Resurgence, filmed shortly before he died. The film was released posthumously and dedicated to him.

== Personal life ==
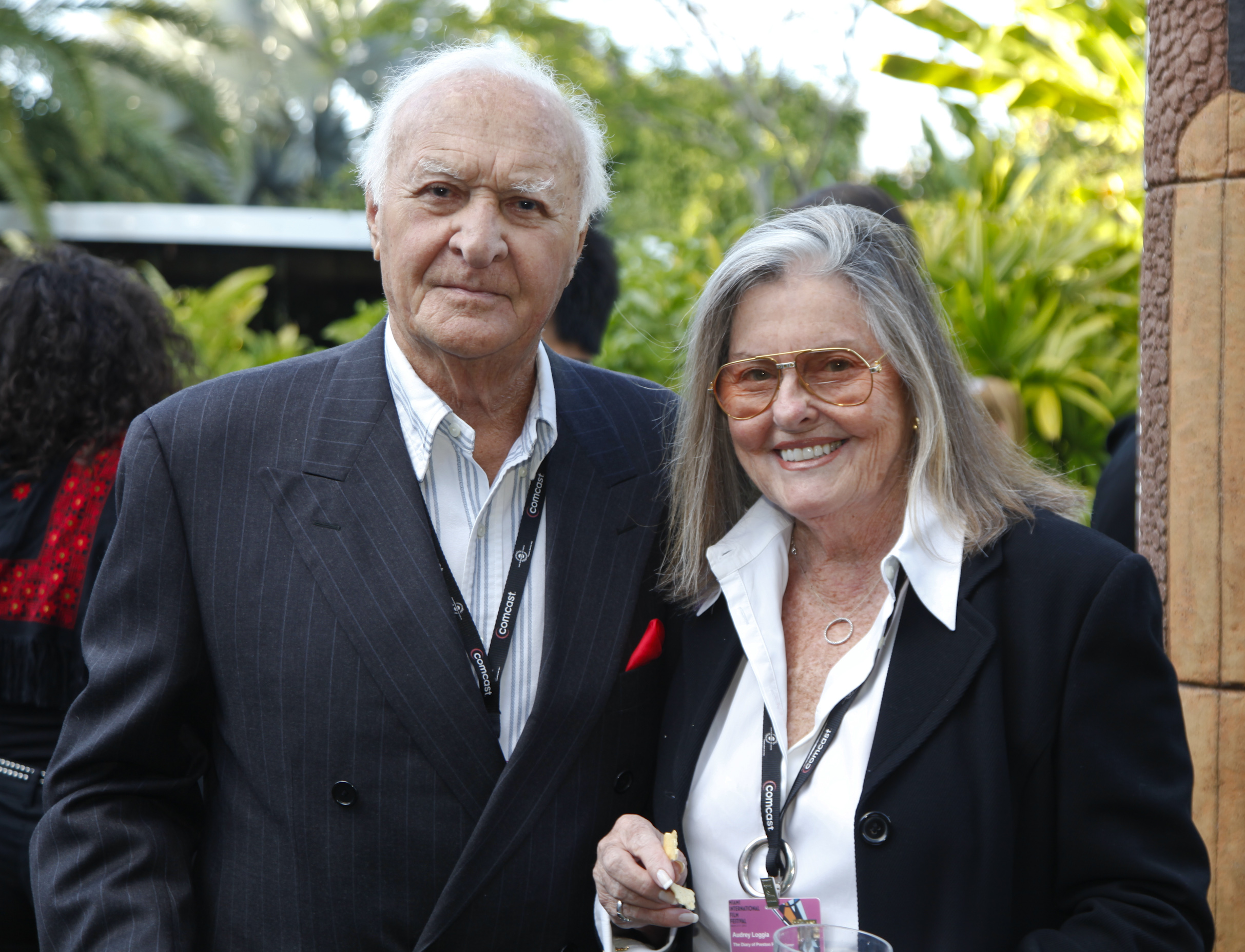
Robert and Audrey Loggia at the 2012 Miami Film Festival in Miami

Loggia was married to Della Marjorie Sloan, from 1954 until they divorced in 1981. They had three children. In 1982, he and Audrey O'Brien married; they were a couple until his death in 2015.

In 2010, Loggia was diagnosed with Alzheimer's disease. He died on December 4, 2015, due to complications from the disease, at his Brentwood, Los Angeles home at age 85. He was interred at Westwood Memorial Park.

== Honors and recognitions ==
In 2010, Loggia was awarded the Ellis Island Medal of Honor in recognition of his humanitarian efforts. On December 17, 2011, he was honored by his alma mater, the University of Missouri, with an honorary degree for his career and his humanitarian efforts.

== Filmography ==
=== Film ===
Year	Title	Role	Notes
1956	Somebody Up There Likes Me	Frankie Peppo	Uncredited
1957	The Garment Jungle	Tulio Renata	
1958	Cop Hater	Detective Steve Carella	
1958	The Lost Missile	Dr. David Loring	
1963	Cattle King	Johnny Quatro	
1965	The Greatest Story Ever Told	Joseph	
1966	The Three Sisters	Solyony	
1966	Elfego Baca: Six Gun Law	Elfego Baca	
1969	Che!	Faustino Morales	
1974	Two Missionaries	Marches Gonzaga	Credited as Roberto Loggia
1977	Speedtrap	Spillano	
1977	First Love	John March	
1978	Revenge of the Pink Panther	Al Marchione	
1980	The Ninth Configuration	Lieutenant John Bennish	
1980	Flatfoot in Egypt	Edward Burns	
1981	S.O.B.	Herb Maskowitz	
1982	An Officer and a Gentleman	Boatswain's Mate Byron Mayo	
1982	Trail of the Pink Panther	Bruno Langois	
1983	Psycho II	Dr. Bill Raymond	
1983	Curse of the Pink Panther	Bruno Langois	
1983	Scarface	Frank Lopez	
1985	Prizzi's Honor	Eduardo Prizzi	
1985	Jagged Edge	Sam Ransom	
1986	Armed and Dangerous	Michael Carlino	
1986	That's Life!	Father Baragone	
1987	Over the Top	Jason Cutler	
1987	Hot Pursuit	Captain "Mac" MacClaren	
1987	The Believers	Lieutenant Sean McTaggert	
1987	Gaby: A True Story	Michel Brimmer	
1987	Amazon Women on the Moon	General McCormick	Uncredited segment "The Unknown Soldier"
1988	Big	Mr. Freddie MacMillan	
1988	Oliver & Company	Sykes	Voice
1989	Relentless	Bill Malloy	
1989	Triumph of the Spirit	Father Arouch	
1990	Opportunity Knocks	Milt Malkin	
1991	The Marrying Man	Lew Horner	
1991	Necessary Roughness	Coach Wally "Rigs" Riggendorf	
1992	Gladiator	Jack "Pappy Jack"	
1992	Innocent Blood	Salvatore "Sal The Shark" Macelli	
1992	Spies Inc.	Mac	
1993	Lifepod	Director Banks	
1994	Bad Girls	Frank Jarrett	
1994	The Last Tattoo	Commander Conrad Dart	
1994	I Love Trouble	Matt Greenfield	
1995	Coldblooded	Gordon	
1995	Man with a Gun	Philip Marquand	
1996	Independence Day	General William Grey	
1997	Lost Highway	Dick Laurent / Mr. Eddy	
1997	Smilla's Sense of Snow	Moritz Jasperson	
1997	The Dog of Flanders	Grandpa Jehan	English dub
1997	The Don's Analyst	Don Vito Leoni	
1998	Wide Awake	Grandpa Beal	
1998	The Proposition	Hannibal Thurman	
1998	Holy Man	John McBainbridge	
1998	Hard Time	"Connie" Martin	
1999	The Suburbans	Jules	
1999	Flypaper	Marvin	
1999	American Virgin	Ronny	
2000	Return to Me	Angelo Pardipillo	
2001	Dodson's Journey	Opti Dodson	
2001	The Shipment	Frank Colucci	
2001	All Over Again	Zack	
2005	The Deal	Jared Tolson	
2006	Funny Money	Feldman	
2006	Rain	Jake Marvin	
2006	Forget About It	Carl Campobasso	
2006	Wild Seven	Mackey Willis	
2008	The Boneyard Collection		
2008	The Least Of These	Father William Jennings	
2009	Shrink	Dr. Robert Carter	
2010	Harvest	"Siv"	
2010	Obituary of the Sun	Samuel Levine	
2011	Fake	Seamus White	
2011	The Grand Theft	General McAvoy	
2011	The Great Fight	Dr. Salvatore Reno	
2011	The Life Zone	John Lation / Satan	
2012	Apostle Peter and the Last Supper	Apostle Peter	
2012	Tim and Eric's Billion Dollar Movie	Tommy Schlaaang	
2012	The Diary of Preston Plummer	John Percy	
2012	Margarine Wars	Grandpa Griswold	
2013	Real Gangsters	Gaitanno "Tanno"	
2014	Snapshot	Paul Grady	
2014	Scavenger Killers	Dr. Montgomery	
2014	An Evergreen Christmas	Pops	
2014	The Big Fat Stone	Father Walter	
2015	Bleeding Hearts	Sheriff Wilson	
2015	No Deposit	Sydney Fischer	
2015	Sicilian Vampire	Santino Trafficante Sr.	
2016	Independence Day: Resurgence	General William Grey	Cameo; Posthumous release
2016	The Red Maple Leaf	Patrick Adams Senior	Posthumous release
2017	Cries of the Unborn	Mr. Eric Lation	Posthumous release
2019	The Savant	Dr. Salvatore Reno	Posthumous release

=== Television ===
Year	Title	Role	Notes
1956–1957	Studio One	-	Season 9 Episode 1: "A Special Announcement"
1956–1957	Studio One	Henry Thomas	Season 9 Episode 28: "The Traveling Lady"
1956–1957	Studio One	Lieutenant Joe Crane	Season 10 Episode 3: "Mutiny on the Shark: Part 1"; Season 10 Episode 4: "Mutiny on the Shark: Part 2"
1958	Playhouse 90	Major Woulman	Season 2 Episode 32: Rumors of Evening
1958	NBC Matinee Theater	Dagnon	Season 3 Episode 103: "The Prophet Hosea"
1958–1960	Walt Disney Presents	Elfego Baca	Season 5 Episode 1: "The Nine Lives of Elfego Baca" (1958); Season 5 Episode 3: "Four Down and Five Lives to Go" (1958); Season 5 Episode 5 Episode 10: "Elfego Baca: Lawman or Gunman" (1958); Season 5 Episode 11: "Law and Order, Incorporated" (1958); Season 5 Episode 17: "Elfego Baca: Attorney at Law" (1959); Season 5 Episode 19: "The Griswold Murder" (1959); Season 6 Episode 7: "Elfego Baca: Move Along, Mustangers" (1959); Season 6 Episode 8: "Elfego Baca: Mustang Man, Mustang Maid" (1959); Season 6 Episode 24: Elfego Baca: Friendly Enemies at Law" (1960); Season 6 Episode 25: Elfego Baca: Gus Tomlin is Dead" (1960)
1959	Wagon Train	Jose Maria Moran	Season 2 Episode 34: "The Jose Maria Moran Story"
1959	Alcoa Presents: One Step Beyond	Tom Grant	Season 2 Episode 15: "The Hand"
1959	Westinghouse Desilu Playhouse	Patsy	Season 2 Episode 5: "Come Back to Sorrento"
1960	The United States Steel Hour	Jacques Planchet / Jonathan Plunkett	Season 7 Episode 16: "How to Make a Killing"
1960	Overland Trail	Captain Porfirio Diaz	Season 1 Episode 11: "Mission into Mexico"
1960–1962	Alfred Hitchcock Presents	Larry Chetnik	Season 6 Episode 9: "The Money"
1960–1962	Alfred Hitchcock Presents	James "Jimmy" French	Season 7 Episode 16: "The Case of M.J.H."
1961	Naked City	Ben Tourelle	Season 3 Episode 4: "The Fingers of Henri Tourelle"
1961	Target: The Corruptors	Johnny Praisewater	Season 1 Episode 5: "The Poppy Vendor"
1961	The Defenders	Joe Manson	Season 1 Episode 12: "Perjury"
1961	Alcoa Premiere	Archduke Franz Ferdinand of Austria-Hungary	Season 1 Episode 9: "The End of a World"
1962	The Untouchables	Leo Mencken / Larry Zenko	Season 3 Episode 17: "Takeover"
1962	The Dick Powell Show	Collin Maese	Season 1 Episode 23: "The Hook"
1962	The DuPont Show of the Week	Kiki	Season 2 Episode 2: "The Interrogator"
1963	The Alfred Hitchcock Hour	"Driver" Arthur	Season 2 Episode 4: "You'll Be the Death of Me"
1963	The Defenders	Jerry Thomas	Season 2 Episode 23: "The Eye of Fear"
1963	Rawhide	Maria Jose Chappala	Season 5 Episode 24: "Incident of the Comanchero"
1963–1964	Ben Casey	Dr. Mike Rosario	Season 3 Episode 2: "Justice to a Microbe"
1963–1964	Ben Casey	John Hanavan	Season 4 Episode 13: "This Wild, Wild, Wild Waltzing World"
1963–1964	The Nurses	Dr. Juan Cortez	Season 3 Episode 13: "The Skill in These Hands"
1964	Route 66	Colonel Zaman	Season 4 Episode 23: "I'm Here to Kill a King"
1965	The Alfred Hitchcock Hour	Richard Schausak	Season 3 Episode 25: "The World's Oldest Motive"
1965	Combat!	Etienne	Season 3 Episode 26: "The Tree of Moray"
1965	Gunsmoke	Lieutenant Cal Tripp	Season 10 Episode 19: "Chief Joseph"
1965–1967	The Wild Wild West	Warren Trevor Colonel Arsenio Barbossa	Season 1 Episode 4: "The Night of Sudden Death" Season 3 Episode 3: "The Night Of The Assassin"
1966	Voyage to the Bottom of the Sea	Dr. Crandell Ames	Season 2 Episode 19: "Graveyard of Fear"
1966–1967	T.H.E. Cat	Thomas Hewitt Edward Cat	26 episodes
1968	The Big Valley	Vern Hickson	Season 4 Episode 9: "The Profit and the Lost"
1968–1970	The High Chaparral	Chio	Season 2 Episode 9: "The Deceivers"
1968–1970	The High Chaparral	Grey Wolf	Season 4 Episode 9: "The Forge of Hate"
1970–1972	The F.B.I.	Alex Poland	Season 6 Episode 8: "The Deadly Pact"
1970–1972	The F.B.I.	Phillip Derrane	Season 7 Episode 20: "Arrangement with Terror"
1974	Cannon	Luis Gutierrez	Season 4 Episode 6: "The Exchange"
1975	Mannix	Inspector Varga	Season 8 Episode 20: "Bird of Prey: Part 1"; Season 8 Episode 21: "Bird of Prey: Part 2"
1975–1978	Starsky & Hutch	Ben Forest	Season 1 Episode 5: "The Fix"
1975–1978	Starsky & Hutch	Jack Parker	Season 4 Episode 10: "The Groupie"
1975	Kojak	Cassidy York	Season 2 Episode 23: "Two-Four-Six for Two Hundred"
1975	McMillan & Wife	Dimetrios Anapopulis	Season 5 Episode 3: "Aftershock"
1975	Ellery Queen	Alexsei Dobrenskov	Season 1 Episode 7: "The Adventure of Colonel Nivin's Memoirs"
1975–1976	S.W.A.T.	Joe Stevens	Season 1 Episode 5: "Hit Men"
1975–1976	S.W.A.T.	Lieutenant Johnson	Season 2 Episode 22: "Any Second Now"
1976	Cannon	Johnny Behr	Season 5 Episode 21: "Snapshot"
1976	Columbo	Harry	Season 5 Episode 5: "Now You See Me"
1976	The Moneychangers	Tony ("Tony Bear")	Season 1 Episode 3: "Part III"; Season 1 Episode 4: "Part IV"
1976–1978	The Rockford Files	Dominic Marcon	Season 3 Episode 5: "Drought at Indianhead River"
1976–1978	The Rockford Files	Manny Arturis	Season 4 Episode 1: "Beamer's Last Case"
1976–1978	The Rockford Files	Russell Nevitt	Season 5 Episode 2: "Rosendahl and Gilda Stern Are Dead"
1976	Charlie's Angels	Paul Terranova	Season 1 Episode 6: "The Killing Kind"
1976	Wonder Woman	Hans Eichler	Season 1 Episode 6: "Wonder Woman vs Gargantua"
1976	Street Killing	Louis Spillane	Television film
1976–1977	The Six Million Dollar Man	Mahmud Majid	Season 4 Episode 9: "The Thunderbird Connection" (Television film)
1976–1977	The Six Million Dollar Man	Hendricks	Season 5 Episode 7: "Rollback"
1976–1977	Police Woman	Paul Nicastro	Season 2 Episode 19: "Wednesday's Child"
1976–1977	Police Woman	Sylvester	Season 3 Episode 16: "Shadow of a Doubt"
1977	Raid on Entebbe	Yigal Allon	Television film
1977	The Bionic Woman	Ali Ben Gazim	Season 2 Episode 17: "Jaime and the King" (Television film)
1978	The Eddie Capra Mysteries	George Carroll	Season 1 Episode 6: "How Do I Kill Thee?"
1979	Hawaii Five-O	Russ Hendrix	Season 11 Episode 18: "The Execution File"
1979–1980	Vega$	Lou Volt	Season 1 Episode 13: "The Eleventh Event"
1979–1980	Vega$	Simon Webster	Season 2 Episode 18: "The Hunter Hunted"
1980	Charlie's Angels	Michael Durano	Season 4 Episode 23: "Toni's Boys"
1980	Magnum, P.I.	Philippe Trusseau	Season 1 Episode 1: "Don't Eat the Snow in Hawaii"; Season 1 Episode 2: "Don't Eat the Snow in Hawaii: Part 2"
1981	Fantasy Island	Porter Brockhill	Season 4 Episode 12: "The Heroine/The Warrior"
1982	A Woman Called Golda	Anwar Sadat	TV miniseries
1982	Little House on the Prairie	Thomas Stark	Season 9 Episode 4: "Rage"
1983–1984	Emerald Point N.A.S.	Yuri Bukharin	16 episodes
1984	Murder, She Wrote	Joe Kellijian	Season 1 Episode 9: "Death Casts a Spell"
1984	Matt Houston	Decker	Season 3 Episode 6: "Return to Nam: Part 1"; Season 3 Episode 7: "Escape from Nam: Part 2"
1985	Streets of Justice	Detective Christopher Ryan	Television film
1986	Magnum, P.I.	Philippe Trusseau / 'La Bulle'	Season 7 Episode 5: "Death and Taxes"
1986	Alfred Hitchcock Presents	Charley	Season 1 Episode 14: "A Very Happy Ending"
1987	Echoes in the Darkness	Jay Smith	2 episodes ("Part I" and "Part II")
1987	Conspiracy: The Trial of the Chicago 8	William Kunstler	Television film
1988	Favorite Son	Nick Mancuso	Season 1 Episode 1: "Part One"
1989–1990	Mancuso, F.B.I.	Nick Mancuso	20 episodes
1991	Sunday Dinner	Ben Benedict	6 episodes
1993	Wild Palms	Senator Anton Kreutzer	5 episodes
1993	Mercy Mission: The Rescue of Flight 771	Gordon Vette	Television film
1995	Picture Windows	Merce	Season 1 Episode 6: "Armed Response"
1996	The Right to Remain Silent	Lieutenant Mike Brosloe	Television film
1996	Mistrial	Captain Lou Unger	Television film
1999	Joan of Arc	Father Monet	2 episodes ("Part I" and "Part II")
2000	Dharma & Greg	General Kirby	Season 4 Episode 4: "Hell No, Greg Can't Go"
2000	Frasier	Stefano	Season 7 Episode 21: "The Three Faces of Frasier"
2000	The Outer Limits	Justice Earl Clayton	Season 6 Episode 21: "Final Appeal"
2000	Touched by an Angel	Chandler Crowne	Season 7 Episode 4: "Restoration"
2001	Malcolm in the Middle	Victor	Season 2 Episode 15: "The Grandparents"
2003	Queens Supreme	Judge Thomas O'Neill	all 13 episodes
2003	Curb Your Enthusiasm	Mel Brooks' Business Associate	Season 4 (2 episodes uncredited)
2004	The Sopranos	Michele "Feech" La Manna	Season 5 Episode 1: "Two Tonys"; Season 5 Episode 2: "Rat Pack"; Season 5 Episode 3: "Where's Johnny?"; Season 5 Episode 4: "All Happy Families"
2006	Tom Goes to the Mayor	Lew Petersen (voice)	Season 2 Episode 6: "Saxman"
2008	Monk	Louie Flynn	Season 7 Episode 4: "Mr. Monk Takes a Punch"
2010	Hawaii Five-0	Boatswain's Mate 1st Class Ed McKay	Season 1 Episode 7: "Ho'apano (Accept)"
2010–2011	Men of a Certain Age	Artie	Season 1 Episode 7: "Father's Fraternity"
2010–2011	Men of a Certain Age	Artie	Season 2 Episode 6: "Let the Sunshine In"; Season 2 Episode 9: "A League of Their Owen"
2011–2013	Family Guy	Himself	Season 9 Episode 15: "Brothers and Sisters"
2011–2013	Family Guy	Himself	Season 11 Episode 14: "Call Girl"

=== Video games ===
Year	Title	Roles	Notes
1999	Freespace 2	Admiral Petrarch	
2001	Grand Theft Auto III	Ray Machowski	
2006	Scarface: The World Is Yours	Frank Lopez, The Narrator, Civilian	
2021	Grand Theft Auto: The Trilogy – The Definitive Edition	Ray Machowski	Archival recordings Remaster of Grand Theft Auto III only

== Awards and nominations ==
Year	Award	Category	Work	Result	ref
1985	Academy Award	Best Supporting Actor	Jagged Edge	Nominated	
1988	Cable ACE Award	Best Actor in a Theatrical or Dramatic Special	Conspiracy: The Trial of the Chicago 8	Nominated	
1988	Saturn Award	Best Supporting Actor	Big	Won	
1990	Primetime Emmy Award	Outstanding Lead Actor in a Drama Series	Mancuso, F.B.I.	Nominated	
1992	Fangoria Chainsaw Award	Best Actor	Innocent Blood	Nominated	
2001	Primetime Emmy Award	Outstanding Guest Actor in a Comedy Series	Malcolm in the Middle	Nominated	
