= No Deposit =

- Directed by: Frank D'Angelo
- Written by: Frank D'Angelo
- Starring: Frank D'Angelo
- Cinematography: Jeremy Major
- Edited by: Robin Gardiner Davids; Aaron Lam; Jeremy Major; Tim Nanasi; Sheldon Rodriguez
- Music by: Frank D'Angelo
- Production company: In Your Ear Productions
- Release date: April 24, 2015
- Running time: 80 minutes
- Country: Canada
- Language: English

No Deposit (sometimes stylized as No Depo$it) is a 2015 Canadian drama film written, directed by and starring Frank D'Angelo.

== Plot ==
A family man's fall from grace through a series of downward spiraling events beyond his control. With his life turned upside down, he hooks up with the wrong people and things take a turn for the worse with almost no way out.

== Cast ==
- Frank D'Angelo as Jimmy Valenti
- Michael Paré as Mickey Ryan
- Peter Coyote as Police Chief Williams
- Robert Loggia as Sydney Fischer
- Paul Sorvino as Alfie
- Doris Roberts as Kat Nugent
- Michael Madsen as Peter Shay
- Daniel Baldwin as Bryan Canning
- Eric Roberts as Gerry Gaci
- Margot Kidder as Margie Ryan
- Tony Nardi as Detective Vincent Scartelli
- Art Hindle as Joseph Ryan
- Ellen Dubin as Judy Ryan
- Laurie Fortier as Angie Vanenti
- Tony Rosato as Detective Tony Charkoff
- Maria del Mar as Maureen Ryan
- Sean McCann as Hostage Negotiator
- Diane Salinger as Gloria Markovitz
- Dominique Swain as Girl In Bar
