= Shallow Hal =

2001 film by Bobby Farrelly and Peter Farrelly

- Theatrical release poster
- Directed by: Peter Farrelly; Bobby Farrelly
- Written by: Peter Farrelly; Bobby Farrelly; Sean Moynihan
- Produced by: Peter Farrelly; Bobby Farrelly; Charles B. Wessler; Bradley Thomas
- Starring: Gwyneth Paltrow; Jack Black; Jason Alexander; Joe Viterelli; Susan Ward
- Cinematography: Russell Carpenter
- Edited by: Christopher Greenbury
- Music by: William Goodrum; Ivy
- Production company: Conundrum Entertainment
- Distributed by: 20th Century Fox
- Release date: November 9, 2001
- Running time: 113 minutes
- Country: United States
- Language: English
- Budget: $40 million
- Box office: $141.1 million

Shallow Hal is a 2001 American romantic comedy film directed by the Farrelly Brothers. The film stars Gwyneth Paltrow and Jack Black, with Jason Alexander, Joe Viterelli, and Susan Ward in supporting roles. Filming took place in various areas including Charlotte, North Carolina, and Sterling and Princeton, Massachusetts at Wachusett Mountain. The plot centers around a womanizer who, while under a hypnotic guise to only see a person's inner beauty, falls in love with a 300-pound woman.

Production for the film was moved ahead to be completed before July 2000, mainly to avoid conflicts with a threatened writer's strike from the Writers Guild of America. The Farrellys initially sought Garry Shandling to play the role of Mauricio in the film, but were unsuccessful and Alexander was cast in the role instead. For Paltrow's role as Rosemary, she was portrayed as both slim and fat in the film, wearing a specially designed 25-pound fat suit as well as prosthetic makeup. Paltrow would later express regret about taking part in the film's production.

Shallow Hal was released in the United States on November 9, 2001, by 20th Century Fox. The film was a box-office success, grossing $141.1 million against a $41 million budget. Initial reviews for the film were mixed, with the premise and humor primarily dividing responses.

== Plot ==
As a boy, Hal Larson visits his reverend father on his deathbed. His father, delirious from painkillers, encourages Hal to never settle with the women he pursues in life and stresses the importance of appearances.

As an adult, Hal, although having forgotten most memories of his father, spends his nights being rejected by beautiful women at night clubs with his equally shallow friend Mauricio. He holds a steady job at JPS Funds, a financial institution run by president Steve Shanahan, but is dismayed after being denied a long-sought promotion. Hal is attracted to his neighbor Jill, who rejects him due to his shallow lifestyle. One day, Hal becomes trapped in an elevator with life coach Tony Robbins, who hypnotizes him into only seeing a person's inner beauty. Hal, not realizing he has been hypnotized, later meets Steve's morbidly obese daughter, Rosemary. Because of her kind and generous personality, Rosemary appears to Hal as a slender, beautiful trophy blonde and he is instantly smitten with her. Used to being overlooked due to her appearance, Rosemary initially interprets Hal's interest as mockery, but begins to date him once she realizes his feelings for her are sincere.

Concerned by Hal's new taste in women, Mauricio convinces Tony to give him the trigger phrase to undo the hypnosis - "Shallow Hal wants a gal". During a dinner date, Rosemary tells Hal she has been asked by the Peace Corps to go on a 14-month mission in Kiribati. Mauricio phones Hal and says the trigger phrase, then arrives at the restaurant and drags Hal out before he can see the real Rosemary. Outside, Mauricio reveals the truth about Tony's hypnotherapy. Hal does not believe him until he runs into Katrina, a woman who initially appeared beautiful to him, but whom he now sees in her true, physically unattractive state. Hal begins to avoid Rosemary, who becomes depressed as a result. Jill develops an interest in Hal, having observed him overcome his shallow nature through his relationship with Rosemary, and invites him to dinner. While on the date with Jill, Hal realizes he loves Rosemary, who has, coincidentally, arrived at the same restaurant with her family and sees the two sitting together. Assuming the worst, she leaves in tears. While heading to the nearest payphone, he walks right past Rosemary, not recognizing her; he then calls her to reassure her of his feelings. Confused and distraught, Rosemary insults and effectively breaks up with him.

Five days later, Steve informs Hal that Rosemary's ex-boyfriend and Peace Corps partner, Ralph, wants to get back together with her. While seeking Rosemary out at the hospital where she volunteers, Hal encounters a young patient named Cadence. Due to the hypnosis, Hal had previously seen Cadence as a perfect little girl, but now realizes she is covered in severe burn scars. This helps change Hal's views on outer beauty in general and inspires him to go after Rosemary. Mauricio admits that he stopped the hypnosis out of envy toward Hal's happiness, and confesses that he has an inoperable vestigial tail which has prevented him from ever getting close to a woman. Hal convinces Mauricio to embrace his abnormality.

Hal heads to the Peace Corps recruiting office and confronts Ralph, believing he and Rosemary have gotten back together, though Ralph denies this and informs Hal that Rosemary's parents are throwing her a farewell party. Hal, Mauricio, and Ralph arrive at Rosemary's parents' home. Rosemary initially rebuffs Hal's presence, but accepts his apology when Hal professes his love for her. Rosemary says she is still leaving on her Peace Corps mission, but Hal says he is coming with her, having just been sworn into the Peace Corps by Ralph's friend Li'iBoy. Hal tries to carry Rosemary bridal-style to the car, but cannot lift her. Moved by his gesture and effort, she triumphantly carries him instead. As they drive off, Mauricio meets a woman who loves dogs, and the two walk off together as he wags his tail.

== Cast ==
- Jack Black as Harold "Hal" Larson
  - Sasha Neulinger as young Hal
- Gwyneth Paltrow as Rosemary "Rosie" Shanahan
  - Ivy Snitzer as overweight Rosemary
- Jason Alexander as Mauricio Wilson
- Zen Gesner as Ralph
- Rene Kirby as Walt
- Joe Viterelli as Steve Shanahan
- Jill Christine Fitzgerald as Mrs. Shanahan
- Susan Ward as Jill
- Joshua Shintani as Li’iBoy
  - Ron Darling as Li'iBoy (gorgeous)
- Nan Martin as Nurse Tanya
  - Sascha Knopf as Nurse Tanya (gorgeous)
- Brianna Gardner as Cadence
- Brooke Burns as Katrina
- Kyle Gass as Artie
- Laura Kightlinger as Jen
- Tony Robbins as Himself
- Bruce McGill as Reverend Larson
- Molly Shannon as Mrs. Larson
- Sayed Badreya as Dr. Sayed
- Rob Moran as Tiffany
  - Mary Wigmore as Tiffany (gorgeous)
- Michael Corrente as homeless
- Darius Rucker as restaurant maitre
- Manon von Gerkan as Lindy
- Erinn Bartlett as Bella

== Production ==
Writer Sean Moynihan is legally blind and was inspired by Tony Robbins to write the script. Earlier versions of the story did not include Robbins' character; instead, a psychic was responsible for Hal's change of view.

In December 1999, Paltrow was in talks to star. The Farrelly brothers tried unsuccessfully to get Garry Shandling to star as Mauricio before Jason Alexander was cast. Production was moved up in order to get the film completed before July 2000 and a threatened Screen Actors Guild strike. Filming took place in Charlotte, North Carolina.

The Farrelly Brothers defended the movie and its plot to critics, arguing it was more than a mere "fat joke" type of movie and was instead one that had a strong message about "inner beauty".

Gwyneth Paltrow played both roles, slim and fat Rosemary (except for a couple of close-up shots of fat Rosemary below the neck, which were played by her body double Ivy Snitzer), and had to wear a specially designed 25-pound fatsuit and prosthetic make-up. She later admitted that she did not enjoy partaking in production of the movie, in particular dreading having to wear the fat suit and makeup. The prosthetic make-up effects and body suits for Rosemary, Rosemary's mother, and all of the secondary characters were designed and created by Tony Gardner and his company Alterian, Inc.

== Reception ==
=== Box office ===
In its opening weekend at the U.S. box office, Shallow Hal grossed $22.5 million, opening at #2 behind Monsters, Inc.. It grossed a total of $141.1 million, of which $70.7 million was in the United States.

=== Critical response ===
On Rotten Tomatoes, the film has a rating of 49%, based on 135 reviews, and an average rating of 5.5/10. The site's critical consensus reads, "While surprisingly sweeter and warm-hearted than previous Farrelly outings, Shallow Hal is also less funny and more bland". On Metacritic, it has a score of 48% based on reviews from 33 critics, indicating "mixed or average reviews". Audiences polled by CinemaScore gave the film an average grade of "C+" on an A+ to F scale.

Roger Ebert of the Chicago Sun-Times gave it 3 out of 4 and called it "Often very funny, but it is also surprisingly moving at times". A. O. Scott of The New York Times called it "a series of fat jokes...[turned] into a tender fable and a winning love story".

Todd McCarthy of Variety wrote: "With the relatively untested Black coming on awfully strong, the lack of directorial finesse lets the enterprise down, creating some clunky scenes and dead air where laughs might have been expected."

Some critics, like Sally E. Smith of BBW Magazine, reacted negatively to the portrayal of fat people in the film, which according to her reinforced the false stereotype that obesity was solely to be blamed on unhealthy eating habits. In a 2023 interview with The Guardian, Paltrow's body double Ivy Snitzer revealed that, following the movie's release, she had faced negative comments claiming that she was "promoting obesity", and insinuations that she should lose weight instead. This led her to develop issues with her body image, which in turn resulted in eating disorders, overexercising and complications from a gastric band surgery.

=== Awards ===
The film was nominated at the 2002 Teen Choice Awards as Choice Movie: Comedy and its leads were nominated Choice Movie: Comedy Actor (Jack Black) and Choice Movie: Comedy Actress (Gwyneth Paltrow).

== Home media ==
Shallow Hal was released on VHS and DVD in July 2002, and topped the rental charts the week it was released. It also performed well on Pay-Per-View. Fox released the film only 30 (rather than 45) days after its debut on DVD and video, and it became the top performing PPV title of 2002.
