= The Neighborhood (film) =

- Directed by: Frank D'Angelo
- Written by: Frank D'Angelo
- Produced by: Frank D'Angelo
- Starring: Franco Nero; Danny Aiello Frank D'Angelo
- Cinematography: Ed Hannaford
- Edited by: Max Coleman; Robin Gardiner Davids; Scott C. Newman
- Music by: Frank D'Angelo
- Release date: August 18, 2017
- Running time: 107 minutes
- Country: Canada
- Language: English

The Neighborhood is a 2017 Canadian drama film directed by Frank D'Angelo.

== Plot ==
A group of hoodlums has been doing minor-crime jobs in their neighborhood since they were kids until they get caught up in a war with a Mafia kingpin.

== Cast ==
- Franco Nero as Guglielmo
- Danny Aiello as Joseph Donatello
- Michael Paré as Johnny "Johnny 3"
- Maureen McCormick as Rachelle
- Margot Kidder as Maggie
- Armand Assante as Tucci
- Leslie Easterbrook as Annabella
- Burt Young as "Jingles"
- John Savage as Vito Bello
- Giancarlo Giannini as Gianluca Moretti
- Daniel Baldwin as Gianluca Moretti
- John Ashton as Matt Krivinsky
- Frank D'Angelo as Angelo Donatello
