= Erinn Bartlett =

American actress

- Born: Erinn Anne Bartlett; February 26, 1973 (age 53); Longmeadow, Massachusetts, U.S.
- Occupation: Actress
- Height: 5 ft 7 in (1.70 m)
- Spouse: Oliver Hudson (m. 2006)
- Children: 3
- Beauty pageant titleholder
- Title: Miss Massachusetts Teen USA 1991
- Years active: 1999–present
- Major competition: Miss Teen USA 1991

Erinn Anne Bartlett (born February 26, 1973) is an American actress who also competed in the Miss Teen USA pageant.

== Early life and education ==
Bartlett was born in Longmeadow, Massachusetts. She graduated from Ithaca College with a degree in communication.

== Career ==
Bartlett first competed in the Miss Massachusetts Teen USA title in 1989, when she placed first runner-up. She went on to win the Miss Massachusetts Teen USA crown in 1991 and represented Massachusetts in the Miss Teen USA 1991 held in Biloxi, Mississippi on August 19, 1991. Bartlett made it to the top twelve of the nationally televised event, placing sixth in interview, last in swimsuit and tenth in evening gown. Her average competition score put her in tenth place overall.

She has also appeared in films Shallow Hal (2001), Pumpkin (2002), Raising Helen (2004), Rumor Has It (2005).

== Personal life ==
Bartlett became engaged to actor Oliver Hudson, son of Goldie Hawn and Bill Hudson, on February 21, 2004 and the two married on June 9, 2006. The ceremony was officiated by a Buddhist monk. In March 2007 it was announced that the couple were expecting their first child. On August 23, 2007, Bartlett gave birth to a boy, Wilder Brooks Hudson. It was announced in October 2009 that the couple were expecting their second child and their son, Bodhi Hawn Hudson, was born on March 19, 2010. Bartlett gave birth to the couple's first daughter, Rio Laura Hudson, on July 18, 2013.

== Filmography ==
=== Film ===
| Year | Title | Role | Notes |
|---|---|---|---|
| 1999 | Deep Blue Sea | Girl #1 | |
| 2000 | The In Crowd | Sheila | |
| 2000 | Little Nicky | Fenner | |
| 2001 | Shallow Hal | Bella | |
| 2002 | Pumpkin | Corinne | |
| 2002 | Buying the Cow | Julie Madison | |
| 2002 | 100 Women | Hope | AKA Girl Fever |
| 2002 | A Day with the Meatball | Meat's Girlfriend | Short |
| 2004 | Raising Helen | Fashion Show Model | |
| 2004 | The Last Run | Amelia | |
| 2005 | Rumor Has It | Donna | |
| 2006 | The Benchwarmers | Salad Girl / Sarah | |

=== Television ===
| Year | Title | Role | Notes |
|---|---|---|---|
| 1999 | Pacific Blue | Suzanne | Episode: "The Naked Truth" |
| 2001 | CSI: Crime Scene Investigation | Blond Woman | Episode: "Organ Grinder" |
| 2002 | Felicity | Claire | Episode: "Time Will Tell" |
| 2002 | A Nero Wolfe Mystery | Anne Tenzer | Episodes: "Motherhunt: Parts 1 & 2" |
| 2003 | Charmed | Jessica | Episode: "House Call" |
| 2003 | Monk | Amber | Episode: "Mr. Monk Meets the Playboy" |
| 2003 | 10-8: Officers on Duty | Rebecca Tilney | Episode: "Lucy in the Sky" |
| 2004 | CSI: Miami | Julie | Episode: "Addiction" |
| 2005 | Out of Practice | Jasmine | Episode: "The Truth About Nerds & Dogs" |
| 2006 | How I Met Your Mother | Mary | Episode: "Mary the Paralegal" |
| 2006 | Four Kings | Denise | Episode: "Bobby's Song" |
| 2007 | NCIS | Madeline Torrance | Episode: "Skeletons" |
| 2008 | Unhitched | Nikki | Episode: "Pilot" |
| 2013 | Rules of Engagement | Caroline | Episode: "Fountain of Youth" |
| 2022 | The Cleaning Lady | Colleen | Episode: "Legacy" |
