= To Gillian on Her 37th Birthday (play) =

1984 play by Michael Brady

To Gillian On Her 37th Birthday is an American play by Michael Brady, in 1984. It was developed through the literary department of the Ensemble Studio Theatre and M Square Entertainment and moved to Circle in the Square.

== Plot ==
To Gillian on Her 37th Birthday is a play in two acts. The time is the present. The place is the back deck and beach of David's island home. The action traces the final weekend of August.

=== Characters ===
- David - age 37, college professor temporarily retired.
- Rachel - age 16, David's daughter
- Cindy - age 16, Rachel's friend
- Paul - age 38, David's brother-in-law, married to Esther
- Esther - age 39, David's sister-in-law, a psychologist, married to Paul
- Kevin - age 28, female, friend of Paul and Esther, recently divorced
- Gillian - age 35, David's former wife who died in a sailing accident two years prior to the events of the play, Esther's sister, Rachel's mom

=== Plot ===
David loves his wife, Gillian. Unfortunately, she died two years ago. David deals with his grief by continuing his romance with Gillian during walks with her "ghost" on the beach at night. While David lives in the past, other family problems crop up in the present in the real world. Esther and Paul come for a visit to try to help Rachel. She has lost her mother and needs her father to snap back into the real world and help her.

== Adaptations ==
It was staged during the 1984-1985 season of the Philadelphia Theatre Company, at the Plays and Players Theatre in Center City Philadelphia.

In 1996, it was produced as a film by Sony Pictures and starred Peter Gallagher, Claire Danes, Kathy Baker, Wendy Crewson, Freddie Prinze Jr., Seth Green, and Michelle Pfeiffer as Gillian.

== Awards ==
It was awarded the Oppenheimer Award for best play of 1983.

== Publication ==
- Brady, Michael (1984). To Gillian On Her 37th Birthday. New York: Broadway Play Publishing Inc. ISBN 9780881450224.
