= Push (American TV series) =

American soap opera

- Created by: Mark B. Perry; Andy Morahan; Laura Gregory; Nicholas Martin
- Starring: Adam Trese; Eddie Mills; Jason Behr; Maureen Flannigan; Laurie Fortier; Scott Gurney; Jaime Pressly; Audrey Wasilewski; Jacobi Wynne
- Composer: Stephen W. Parsons
- Country of origin: United States
- No. of seasons: 1
- No. of episodes: 8 (5 unaired)

Production
- Running time: 60 minutes
- Production companies: Starboard Home Productions; Great Guns Films; Perry Pictures; Stu Segall Productions; Columbia TriStar Television

Original release
- Network: ABC
- Release: April 6 – August 6, 1998

Push (also rendered PUSH) is an American primetime soap opera that aired on ABC. The series was about a group of young Olympic hopefuls in training at California Southern University. It aired two episodes in April 1998 before being pulled from the air due to low ratings; a third episode aired on August 6, 1998. It was cancelled after 3 episodes, leaving 5 unaired, two of which, the fourth and fifth episodes, were originally planned to air.

The show is produced by Starboard Home Productions in association with Great Guns Films and Stu Segall Productions, and was distributed by Perry Pictures.

== Cast ==
- Adam Trese as Victor Yates, the gymnastics team coach whose career was ended by a mishap in the 1996 Olympics
- Eddie Mills as Scott Trysfan, a freshman swimming star
- Jason Behr as Dempsey Easton, the former top track and field runner until Milo joined the team
- Maureen Flannigan as Erin Galway, a swimmer with a rich father
- Laurie Fortier as Cara Bradford, a gymnast training for the 2000 Olympics
- Scott Gurney as Tyler Mifflin, a struggling freshman gymnast
- Jaime Pressly as Nikki Lang, an assistant coach of the gymnastics team
- Audrey Wasilewski as Gwen Sheridan, a pharmacology major who doesn't compete in any sports
- Jacobi Wynne as Milo Reynolds, a freshman and the best track and field runner on the team

== Episodes ==
No.	Title	Directed by	Original release date
1	"Pilot"	Eric Laneuville	April 6, 1998
2	"The Rivals"	Kristoffer Tabori	April 13, 1998
3	"On Your Marks..."	James Contner	August 6, 1998
4	"Walk It Off"	TBD	unaired
5	"Athletic Supporters"	TBD	unaired
6	"It's Only Rock and Roll"	TBD	unaired
7	"Direct Contact"	TBD	unaired
8	"Stakes"	TBD	unaired

== Reception ==
Push was not well-received critically. Ken Tucker of Entertainment Weekly gave the show a grade of C−, lamenting that "Push is not the musky melodrama I’d hoped for", adding that "Push is already a candidate to be pulled [from the air]." Tom Jicha of the Sun-Sentinel concluded that "Push manages a feat of Olympian proportions. It makes sex, drugs and rock 'n' roll boring." Terry Kelleher of People gave Push a D+ grade, and dismissed the show by saying it was "...nothing more than jock soap opera with a music-video look."
