= Dead and Deader =

2006 American made-for-television film

- DVD cover
- Written by: Mark A. Altman; Steven Kriozere
- Directed by: Patrick Dinhut
- Starring: Dean Cain; Guy Torry; Susan Ward; John Billingsley; Armin Shimerman; Colleen Camp
- Composer: Joe Kraemer
- Country of origin: United States
- Original language: English

Production
- Producers: Mark A. Altman; Mark Gottwald; Chuck Speed
- Cinematography: Raymond Stella
- Editor: Alan Pao
- Running time: 89 minutes
- Production companies: Mindfire Entertainment; Starz Media

Original release
- Network: Sci Fi Channel
- Release: December 16, 2006

Dead and Deader (formerly known as House of the Dead 3) is a 2006 American made-for-television zombie comedy horror film directed by Patrick Dinhut. The film stars Dean Cain, Guy Torry, Peter Greene and Susan Ward, with cameos from Armin Shimerman, John Billingsley, and Dean Haglund. It was aired from Sci Fi Channel on December 16, 2006.

== Plot ==
After communications to a small medical outpost in Cambodia was cut off, a Special Forces squad is sent to investigate. As they approach the outpost they are attacked by zombies. As the zombies are dispatched, Lieutenant Bobby Quinn survives with heavy injuries. He radios for a medivac airlift, then falls unconscious.

Quinn wakes up on an exam table at Fort Preston army base. The shocked coroner explains that he arrived in a body-bag and had been pronounced DOA. Suddenly feeling a pain in his right arm, Quinn grabs a scalpel and cuts it open. Gushing out of the wound is green blood and a strange scorpion, which he crushes. The incision then rapidly heals, and Quinn finds that he now possesses superhuman strength. He also begins feeling intense hunger that can only be dulled by ingesting raw, red meat and teams up with military chef, Judson.

Quinn and Judson fight their way out of the army base and leaves to find his fellow squad-members. They stop at a small road-side bar and meets Holly, a part-time bartender. The local news had aired a report about the killings at Fort Preston, labeling Quinn and Judson as suspects. The bar patrons lock them inside the cooler. The bar is then attacked by Zombies. Holly frees Quinn and Judson, and they fight their way out.

Quinn eventually learns that a doctor named Dr. Scott plans to use the scorpion venom to revive dead tissues and sell for a profit. Quinn, Holly and Judson follow Dr. Scott back to Fort Preston, where Scott is killed by zombies attempting to extract a scorpion. After destroying the scorpion and killing all of the zombies, Judson, Holly and Quinn escape from the base and leave.

Outside the base, Quinn, Judson and Holly lure zombies toward the armory, blowing it up using a stash of ammunition. They narrowly escape as the base goes up in flames. After making sure no zombies survive, they walk away together.

== Cast ==
- Dean Cain as Lieutenant Bobby Quinn
- Guy Torry as Judson
- Susan Ward as Holly
- Peter Greene as Dr. Scott
- Ellie Cornell as Dr. Adams
- Kirk B. R. Woller as Major Bascom
- Colleen Camp as Mrs. Wisteria
- Armin Shimerman as Flutie, The Coroner
- John Billingsley as Langdon
- Natassia Malthe as Dr. Boyle
- Dean Haglund as Funeral Home Director
- Ho-Sung Pak as Superstar Merc

== Production ==
Originally titled House of the Dead 3, a continuation of the movie series based on the video game franchise of the same name, this was soon dropped seemingly due to licensing issues. Dead and Deader was director Patrick Dinhut's first feature film. It is a lighthearted zombie movie, and has a strong comedic bent. The film is filled with pop culture references and joking aside, including Star Wars and Dawn of the Dead. For example, the character Judson hints about Dean Cain's role as Superman on Lois & Clark: The New Adventures of Superman, at one point suggesting that Quinn use "heat vision" as a means of escape from a cooler.

Several characters have names containing pop culture references. For example, Armin Shimerman plays a character named "Flutie", which is a reference to his role on Buffy the Vampire Slayer. Shimerman played principal Snyder, the successor to a principal named "Flutie". There is also a debate between Pvt. Connery and Pvt. Lazenby on the merits of various versions of James Bond actors. Sean Connery and George Lazenby were actors who played James Bond. The soldiers' conversation mirrors dialogue by director and writer Kevin Smith.

== Release ==
The film made its debut on the Sci-Fi channel on December 16, 2006. It was later released to DVD in the US on April 10, 2007. In Australia, it was released via Starz Home Entertainment in 2007, and had a theatrical release in 2008 in the UK via Fluid Entertainment.

== Reception ==
Travis Estvold of Boise Weekly wrote "It probably would've done better as a 45-minute episode of The Outer Limits rather than as a feature film, except it may have even given that show a bad name". Jon Condit of Dread Central rated it 2/5 stars and wrote "By the time the closing credits rolled, Dead and Deader felt less like a new movie and more like a rejected mid-80s TV pilot".

Bloody Disgusting rated the film 3.5/5 stars, and wrote "Truth be told for a low budget feature that made its debut on the Sci-Fi Channel it definitely has its moments". Scott Weinberg of DVD Talk rated it 2.5/5 stars and wrote "It's nothing but a low-budget, tongue-in-cheek mixture of Blade, 48 HRS., 28 Days Later, and any 'angry commando' action flick you can imagine – but it's also kinda fun, too".

Writing in The Zombie Movie Encyclopedia, Volume 2, academic Peter Dendle said, "The film's promising opening deteriorates into buffoonery and yawny punch-lines."
