= The In Crowd (2000 film) =

2000 film by Mary Lambert

- Theatrical release poster
- Directed by: Mary Lambert
- Written by: Mark Gibson; Philip Halprin
- Produced by: James G. Robinson
- Starring: Susan Ward; Lori Heuring; Matthew Settle; Nathan Bexton
- Cinematography: Tom Priestley Jr.
- Edited by: Pasquale Buba
- Music by: Jeff Rona
- Production company: Morgan Creek
- Distributed by: Warner Bros.
- Release date: July 19, 2000
- Running time: 105 minutes
- Country: United States
- Language: English
- Budget: $24 million
- Box office: $5.3 million

The In Crowd is a 2000 American teen thriller film directed by Mary Lambert, and starring Susan Ward, Lori Heuring, Matthew Settle, and Nathan Bexton.

The In Crowd was released by Warner Bros. on July 19, 2000. The film received negative reviews from critics and was a box office bomb, grossing $5.3 million against a $24 million budget.

== Plot ==
When Adrien Williams is released from a mental institution, her former doctor Henry Thompson immediately tries to get her back on her feet by getting her a job at a country club on the East Coast, where she is introduced to the lifestyle of the snooty, rich "beautiful people". Brittany Foster, a young woman who lives in the area, befriends Adrien and takes her under her wing, accepting her as part of a clique of wealthy teenagers. Brittany's group of friends make comments about how much Adrien looks like Brittany's older sister Sandra who had moved away. At first she enjoys being a close confidant of Brittany but Adrien soon begins to discover how twisted Brittany actually is when Matt Curtis, an object of Brittany's affection, begins to show an interest in Adrien.

Brittany sets out to get rid of Adrien, by stealing her file from Henry's office and discovers Adrien's past. Adrien's revelation of Brittany is much more disturbing, when she discovers that Sandra used to be "queen bee" of this circle of friends and that she often treated Brittany badly. Brittany is furious that her best friend Kelly deceived her when she overhears her explaining the situation of her missing sister to Adrien. To keep her secret under wraps, she drowns Kelly and later kills Henry, pinning the blame on Adrien. Her supervisor knew about Adrien's stay at the mental institution and readily believes Adrien to be the killer.

With the help of Bobby, one of Brittany's friends, Adrien escapes the mental institution. Adrien heads back to the country club, where everyone is attending an end-of-summer party. Using the information that Kelly told her, and putting together some odds and ends Adrien realizes that Brittany had actually killed Sandra and faked her moving away. Adrien shows up at the country club dressed as Sandra. Brittany sees who she believes to be her sister and starts to freak out. Brittany heads to the woods and unearths Sandra's body, just to prove that she is, in fact dead. Adrien confronts her, and is attacked by Brittany and just before she tries to murder her, verbally confesses why she killed her sister. Hearing the fight everyone gathers outside to witness that Brittany is insane and that she killed her sister. Adrien moves on and leaves the country club, and it is Brittany who ends up in the mental institution. The last scene shows Brittany using her beauty and womanly wiles on a male orderly, with the audience led to believe that she would more than likely escape the mental institution.

== Cast ==
- Susan Ward as Brittany Foster
- Lori Heuring as Adrien Williams
- Matthew Settle as Matt Curtis
- Nathan Bexton as Bobby
- Tess Harper as Dr. Amanda Giles
- Laurie Fortier as Kelly
- Kim Murphy as Joanne
- Jay R. Ferguson as Andy
- A.J. Buckley as Wayne
- Katharine Towne as Morgan
- Charlie Finn as Greg
- Ethan Erickson as Tom
- Erinn Bartlett as Sheila
- Peter Mackenzie as Bob Mead
- Daniel Hugh Kelly as Dr. Henry Thompson

== Editing ==
Initially, the film was rated R, but a sexual scene between Brittany and Henry Thompson was trimmed for the film to receive a PG-13 rating. In the original R-rated version, Brittany began to remove her dress where her breasts were revealed and then her dress was taken down to as low as her thighs. In the PG-13 version, the scene was not extended beyond the exposure of Brittany's breasts. A kiss between Brittany and Kelly was also trimmed for the film to receive the PG-13 rating.

== Release ==
In the United States, Warner Home Video released the PG-13 version of The In Crowd in VHS format on November 28, 2000. On June 1, 2004, it was released on DVD in a snap case cover, like many other Morgan Creek DVD releases. In the United Kingdom, the film received a VHS release on April 22, 2002. Although it is rated 12 in the UK, which is usually the equivalent of a PG-13 in the United States, it is in fact the R-rated version, containing the full sexual scene between Brittany and Henry, and the kiss between Brittany and Kelly. The DVD was released in the UK on September 18, 2002.

== Critical reception ==
The In Crowd was universally panned by critics, who thought the film was "unintentionally funny" when it should have been intense. On Rotten Tomatoes, the film has a 2% approval rating based on 60 reviews, with an average rating of 2.9/10. The website's critics consensus reads: "A dull, soapy potboiler that lacks the energy to qualify as a guilty pleasure, The In Crowd is undone by slow pacing, poor acting, and a stunning lack of originality." Metacritic, which uses a weighted average, assigned the film a score of 14 out of 100, based on 16 critics, indicating "overwhelming dislike". Audiences polled by CinemaScore gave the film an average grade of "C" on an A+ to F scale.

Variety called the film "enjoyable camp."
