= Rene Kirby =

American film and television actor (1955–2025)

- Born: February 27, 1955; Burlington, Vermont, U.S.
- Died: July 11, 2025 (aged 70); Burlington, Vermont, U.S.
- Occupation: Actor
- Years active: 2001–2005

Rene Kirby (February 27, 1955 – July 11, 2025) was an American film and television actor.

== Career ==
Kirby was best known for his performance in the Farrelly Brothers' film Shallow Hal. In this film he played the role of Walt, a man who, like Kirby himself, was born with spina bifida.

== Death ==
Kirby died on July 11, 2025, at the age of 70.

== Film and television appearances ==
- Shallow Hal (2001) - Walt
- Stuck on You (2003) - Phil Rupp
- Carnivàle (Episode titled "The Road to Damascus" in 2005) - Hoppy
