= To Gillian on Her 37th Birthday =

1996 film by Michael Pressman

- Theatrical release poster
- Directed by: Michael Pressman
- Screenplay by: David E. Kelley
- Based on: To Gillian on Her 37th Birthday by Michael Brady
- Produced by: Marykay Powell; David E. Kelley
- Starring: Peter Gallagher; Claire Danes; Kathy Baker; Wendy Crewson; Bruce Altman; Michelle Pfeiffer
- Cinematography: Tim Suhrstedt
- Edited by: William Scharf
- Music by: James Horner
- Production company: Rastar
- Distributed by: Triumph Films
- Release date: October 18, 1996
- Running time: 93 minutes
- Country: United States
- Language: English
- Box office: $4.1 million (US)

To Gillian on Her 37th Birthday is a 1996 American romantic fantasy drama film directed by Michael Pressman and adapted by David E. Kelley from the play of the same name by Michael Brady. It stars Peter Gallagher, Michelle Pfeiffer and Claire Danes. The original score was composed by James Horner.

A father and daughter, David and Rachel, are struggling to come to terms with the tragic death of wife and mother, Gillian, when they invite her sister and her husband to commiserate the second anniversary of the dark day.

The film adapted from a play was released in the US on October 25, 1996, and was overall panned by critics.

== Plot ==
On her birthday, Gillian falls from the mast of a yacht on a family outing and dies. Distraught, Gillian's husband David Lewis turns their summer cottage in Nantucket, Massachusetts into a permanent home. He spends most of his time on the beach there, communicating with Gillian's spirit and unwittingly neglecting their daughter Rachel.

On the second anniversary of Gillian's death, David invites her sister Esther Wheeler and her husband Paul to stay for the weekend. She insists on bringing her female friend Kevin Dollof, whom she hopes David will become romantically interested in. He, however, ignores her and proceeds with the ritualistic celebration of Gillian's birthday.

At the beach house, Paul tries to discourage Esther from meddling in David's affairs. David goes for a run while Paul tries to confront him about his hermit-like behavior.

As part of the special weekend ritual, they have a formal fancy dinner in the house. There Esther accuses David of holing himself in, neglecting Rachel and his literature professor background. He insists that he has taken a sabbatical to write a book, then stomps off to walk on the beach.

There, David talks with Gillian. He talks about everyone's arrival and the pressure they are putting on him to move on. Gillian reminds him that Rachel must always come first. Once she has disappeared again, David comes face-to-face with Rachel and admits both that he talks to Gillian's imagined ghost and that he is not really writing a book.

When Rachel comes in, Esther presses her, but she says that there is nothing to worry about. That night, sensing her sleeplessness, Paul discovers that Esther has a court appointment on Monday to petition that David lose custody for neglect, as Rachel is increasingly withdrawn and her grades have been slipping.

The next day, David throws himself into the sand sculpture contest he has been preparing for weeks, determined to beat the child who won the previous year. Rachel's friend Cindy encourages her to wear a provocative bikini and strut down the beach. They attract most males on the beach, including Paul. When David sees Rachel being ogled at, he hurries to cover her up.

David later calls out to a woman, probably due to heat stroke. Having mistaken her for Gillian, he then collapses. After waking up, David discovers that he has won the competition. Rachel is concerned, wishing that he would move on.

Paul lets David know about Esther's court date on Monday to try to convince him to better hide his unusual behavior, so he races back to confront her. David tells her to get out, then Esther points out that she had thwarted his suicide attempt back in the day.

Rachel goes to a party with Joey, a guy she met on the beach. David goes to the coast to talk with Gillian. Esther sends Kevin to talk to him, and she suggests that he is idolizing Gillian rather than recognising her flaws.

As Rachel never consumed alcohol, Joey brings her back drunk after having only two drinks. She goes to bed to sleep it off. Rachel dreams that Gillian takes her night cycling, but wakes up screaming as a tractor-trailer almost hits her in the nightmare. She tells David that she can no longer stay with him there, as he cannot let Gillian go.

The events of the weekend cause Esther and Paul to re-examine their relationship, as Cindy's flirty nature and his innuendo causes friction for the couple. When Cindy calls Paul's bluff, he does not try anything. Paul points out to Esther that they are both envious of David's bond with Gillian, as he is still crazy about her twenty years since they met whereas they are more companions.

Seeing the Wheelers, Kevin and Rachel off at the ferry, David says goodbye to Rachel, who doubles back, declaring that she will not leave him. David says that he will stay one more day to board up the house and leave too, coming to realize that he can be an attentive father to Rachel without betraying Gillian's memory.

== Cast ==
- Peter Gallagher as David Lewis
- Michelle Pfeiffer as Gillian Lewis
- Claire Danes as Rachel Lewis
- Laurie Fortier as Cindy Bayles
- Wendy Crewson as Kevin Dollof
- Bruce Altman as Paul Wheeler
- Kathy Baker as Esther Wheeler
- Freddie Prinze Jr. as Joey Bost
- Rachel Seidman-Lockamy as Megan Weeks
- Seth Green as Danny

== Production ==
The film was filmed on location in Nantucket, Massachusetts, and in and around Wilmington, North Carolina, although some of the beach scenes were filmed in Long Beach, California, and the sailing accident was filmed in Marina del Rey, California; the obvious differences between the two were noticeable enough to be mentioned by The New York Times reviewer Janet Maslin. Filming lasted from late September to late November 1995.

== Reception ==
The film holds a rating of 14% on Rotten Tomatoes based on 29 reviews, indicating an overwhelmingly negative critical response.

Emanuel Levy in Variety described the film as "a bargain-basement Ghost, a hybrid of an earnest, inspirational play and a sleek, calculated Lifetime telepic." In her review for The New York Times, Janet Maslin wrote: "It's not easy for the story's tear-jerking potential to be realized when its characters express their pain as if they were writing greeting cards." Rita Kempley of The Washington Post wrote that "for all the moonlight and magic, the film scares up little in the way of enchantment."

Many critics found it difficult to accept the basic premise, that the main character's continued mourning of his deceased wife is so detrimental to those around him. Roger Ebert, in particular, expressed frustration: "The movie cannot see that Esther is a deranged nuisance who should mind her own business, that David is entitled to his grief, that Rachel is happy living on the island, and that if Gillian appears to David, so much the better." Jack Matthews of the Los Angeles Times wrote: "Despite its apparent parallels to Ghost, Gillian takes an entirely opposite path. Throughout Ghost, we were made to feel desperate for a reunion of Patrick Swayze's roaming spirit with a mourning Demi Moore. In Gillian, the whole purpose is to get David to give up the ghost." Mick LaSalle of the San Francisco Chronicle thought the film lacked dramatic impetus: "the grieving husband never quite seems crazy enough - and the sister is never angry enough...drama is avoided. Issues are muddy. And everyone stays a nice person... In fact, typical of the film's undramatic choices - it's ungenerous unwillingness to commit to the extreme - the husband knows she [Gillian] is an illusion. So he's not crazy. She's not a ghost. And the sister-in-law, far from evil, is merely concerned. So why are we watching these people?"

One aspect that garnered unanimous praise was Danes' performance as the troubled daughter. Levy wrote, "Danes proves again that she's one of the most naturally gifted actresses of her generation." Maslin described her as "especially expressive in the film's later scenes, demonstrating a rare ability to seem fresh and honest when her material quite clearly is not." Matthews wrote, "Danes is terrific playing an awkward teenager trying to understand her father's problems while feeling the first stirrings of passion in herself." Kempley wrote of Danes, "the gifted actress steals the show."

== Accolades ==
Claire Danes won a Young Artist Award for Best Performance in a Feature Film - Supporting Young Actress.
