= Sicilian Vampire =

- Theatrical release poster
- Directed by: Frank D'Angelo
- Written by: Frank D'Angelo
- Produced by: Barry Sherman; Frank D'Angelo
- Starring: Frank D'Angelo; James Caan; Daryl Hannah; Paul Sorvino; Robert Loggia
- Cinematography: Jeremy Major
- Edited by: Jeremy Major; Robin Gardiner Davids; Tim Nanasi
- Music by: Frank D'Angelo
- Production company: In Your Ear Productions
- Release date: November 4, 2015 (Big Apple Film Festival)
- Running time: 124 minutes
- Country: Canada
- Language: English
- Budget: $11.3 million

Sicilian Vampire is a 2015 Canadian horror drama film written, directed by and starring Frank D'Angelo. It also stars James Caan, Daryl Hannah, Paul Sorvino, and Robert Loggia in his final film role before his death. The film revolves around Santino "Sonny" Trafficante, a reputed mobster, who is bitten by a bat and turned into a vampire while at his hunting lodge. With his new abilities, Trafficante feels the need to right the wrongs in his life, while simultaneously trying to protect his loved ones.

== Plot ==
Mobster "Sonny" Trafficante becomes a vampire after being bitten by a bat. He becomes imbued with supernatural powers, including the ability to speak to the dead.

== Cast ==
- Frank D'Angelo as Santino "Sonny" Trafficante Jr.
- James Caan as Professor Bernard Isaacs
- Daryl Hannah as Carmelina Trafficante
- Paul Sorvino as Jimmy Scambino
- Robert Loggia as Santino Trafficante Sr.
- Armand Assante as Vince
- Robert Davi as Sal "Big Sal"
- Michael Paré as Sammy
- Eric Roberts as Detective Louis Marshall
- Daniel Baldwin as Vito
- Tony Nardi as Anthony "Little Anthony"
- Art Hindle as Detective Domenic Supray

== Production ==
With an $11.3 million production budget, Sicilian Vampire is D'Angelo's highest-budgeted film to date. His three previous directorial efforts had budgets of "at least" $3.7 million, with actors being "paid in cash". The majority of Sicilian Vampire's budget went into securing high profile actors; in particular, James Caan and Paul Sorvino. Other aspects of the budget went into paying for "wildly expensive" 6K resolution cameras, which—according to Vanity Fair—are "the highest-resolution digital cameras readily available on the market".

== Critical reception ==
Vadim Rizov wrote a piece in Vanity Fair titled "How Did an Oscar-Nominated Legend End Up in This Painfully Amateurish Horror Film?" He attended the screening of Sicilian Vampire at the Big Apple Film Festival and gave it a scathing review, writing that, as in all D'Angelo films, "continuity errors, plot inconsistencies, and baffling incompetence reign supreme."

== Soundtrack ==
I Want to Live Forever: Official Soundtrack from the Feature Film Sicilian Vampire

Film score by Frank D'Angelo
- Released: April 28, 2015
- Recorded: 2015
- Genre: Soundtrack
- Length: 52:24
- Label: Premium Sol Entertainment, Inc.

I Want to Live Forever is D'Angelo's eighth studio album, and the official soundtrack album for Sicilian Vampire. D'Angelo released the album after signing a deal with RED Distribution, a subsidiary of Sony Music Entertainment.

I Want to Live Forever: Official Soundtrack from the Feature Film Sicilian Vampire
No.	Title	Length
1.	"Change"	3:51
2.	"My Memory"	4:07
3.	"I Want to Live Forever"	4:03
4.	"Let Me Be"	3:50
5.	"I Love You"	4:33
6.	"Just A Gigolo"	3:46
7.	"Fly Me to the Moon"	3:26
8.	"Run Don't Walk"	3:50
9.	"I Want to Live Forever (Remix)"	5:19
10.	"Let Me Be (Remix)"	4:38
11.	"You Are My Heart"	4:14
12.	"You're My Reward"	3:27
13.	"My Dark Soul (Instrumental Version)"	1:58
14.	"My Dark Soul (Single Version)"	4:02
Total length:		52:24
