= The Red Maple Leaf =

- Directed by: Frank D'Angelo
- Written by: Frank D'Angelo
- Produced by: Barry Sherman; Frank D'Angelo
- Starring: Frank D'Angelo; James Caan; Robert Loggia; Martin Landau; Paul Sorvino; Kris Kristofferson; Mira Sorvino
- Cinematography: Ed Hannaford
- Music by: Frank D'Angelo
- Production company: In Your Ear Productions
- Release date: September 9, 2016
- Running time: 132 minutes
- Countries: Canada; United States
- Language: English

The Red Maple Leaf is a 2016 Canadian-American, crime drama film written and directed by Frank D'Angelo and starring D'Angelo alongside James Caan, Robert Loggia, Martin Landau, Paul Sorvino, Kris Kristofferson, and Mira Sorvino. The film is dedicated to the memory of Loggia and Doris Roberts. The film marks Landau's final on-screen appearance as he died ten months after its release.

== Plot ==
Jennie Adams, daughter of U.S. Ambassador Patrick Adams and granddaughter of Senator George Secord, disappears in Ottawa. Amid jurisdictional tensions between Canada and the United States, RCMP detectives Alfonso Palermo and Robert Santos lead the investigation on behalf of the Canadian government. Palermo, still grieving the loss of his wife and daughter, becomes personally invested in the case.

The detectives interview Ambassador Adams, his wife, and his assistant Marie MacDonald. Pressure from the U.S. President intensifies scrutiny, and Palermo’s traditional methods strain relations with American agents. A clue found at a nearby bar supports Palermo’s theory that one of the kidnappers had been there.

Palermo travels to Los Angeles to question Mrs. Stewart, the ambassador’s mistress, and visits his disapproving parents. Senator Secord manipulates Palermo into revealing his struggle with alcohol.

Back in Canada, Palermo and Santos briefly detain a suspect. As the investigation deepens, Palermo uncovers troubling aspects of the ambassador’s past. Mrs. Adams, whose marriage is deteriorating, invites Palermo to dinner. Meanwhile, a former chauffeur recalls a disturbing comment made by the ambassador about his daughter being “in the way.”

A forensic link between bubble wrap at the crime scene and the bar corroborates Palermo’s theory. Struggling emotionally, he relapses and is referred to therapy after an intervention by friends and colleagues.

MacDonald eventually confesses to abducting Jennie and hiding her in a warehouse. While Santos arrests her, Palermo rushes to the location, discovers the girl drugged but alive, and carries her to safety—haunted throughout by visions of his late wife.

== Cast ==
- Kris Kristofferson as President John Francis Marshall
- James Caan as Senator George Lawrence Secord
- Robert Loggia as Governor Patrick Adams Senior, Ambassador's Father
- Doris Roberts as Mrs. Samantha Adams, The Ambassador's Mother
- Michael Paré as Ambassador Patrick Adams
- Laurie Fortier as Margaret Adams, The Ambassador's Wife
- Ellen Dubin as Marie MacDonald, The Ambassador's P.A.
- Martin Landau as Bernard Florence, The Ambassador's Ex-Driver
- Vito Rezza as Director Bryan James McNab
- Tony Nardi as Special Agent Robert Santos
- Frank D'Angelo as Special Agent Alfonso Palermo
- Paul Sorvino as Joseph Palermo, Alfonso's Dad
- Mira Sorvino as Marianna Palermo, Alfonso's Wife
- Romy Weltman as Jennifer Adams
- Armand Assante as FBI Agent Joseph Cortez
- Marc Blucas as FBI Agent Derek Sampson
- Daniel Baldwin as Richard Barton
- Margot Kidder as Dr. Amanda Walker
- Eric Roberts as Secret Service Agent Holmes
- Tony Rosato as Vincent Marcella
- Maria Del Mar as Maggie, Waitress in the bar and the Blind Swine

== Production ==
The film was shot in Hamilton, Ontario and Los Angeles, California.
