= Susan Ward =

American actress and model

- Born: Susan Michelle Ward; April 15, 1976 (age 50); Monroe, Louisiana, U.S.
- Occupations: Actress, model
- Years active: 1992–2012
- Spouse: David C. Robinson (m. 2005)
- Children: 1

Susan Michelle Ward (born April 15, 1976) is an American former actress and model. She made her film debut in the 1997 sequel, Poison Ivy: The New Seduction, before appearing in films including, The In Crowd (2000), Going Greek (2001), Shallow Hal (2001), and Wild Things 2 (2004).

Ward is perhaps best known for her roles as Meg Cummings in the entire run of a soap opera, Sunset Beach (1997–1999), and as Chloe Kmetko in the series, Make It or Break It (2009–2011).

== Early life ==
Ward was born and raised in Monroe, Louisiana. She is the daughter of detective Eddie Ward and Emily Sue Ward, a nurse and associate professor. Ward attended Monroe Christian School, a private, faith-based elementary school whose stated purpose is to "to engage, equip, and empower God's children". She began modeling at age 13, leaving school and moving to New York City to do so. She attended Northeast Louisiana University for one year before pursuing her acting career.

== Career ==
Ward made her acting debut appearing in the ABC daytime soap opera All My Children in 1995. The following year, she was a regular cast member on the short-lived NBC teen drama Malibu Shores, produced by Aaron Spelling. She made guest appearances on Hercules: The Legendary Journeys and Xena: Warrior Princess and had a secondary role in the erotic thriller film Poison Ivy: The New Seduction.

In late 1996, Ward was cast as virginal Meg Cummings on the Aaron Spelling's NBC soap opera Sunset Beach, which aired from 1997 to 1999. In 1999, she turned to films and starred as the psychotic Brittany Foster in the 2000 teen thriller The In Crowd. The movie was a commercial disappointment in theaters, but found some success on cable and home video. The following year, Ward played a supporting role in the Farrelly Brothers movie Shallow Hal. She has also acted in numerous other direct-to-DVD movies, and has made guest appearances in various TV shows, most notably Friends.

In 2009, she landed the role Chloe Kmetko, mother of a young gymnast, on the ABC Family drama series Make It or Break It. She was part of the main cast during the show's first two seasons.

== Personal life ==
On June 4, 2005, Ward married David C. Robinson, the vice president of Morgan Creek Productions, the movie studio that produced The In Crowd. They met when he cast her as the film lead in 1999. Dr. Wayne Keltner, a friend of the bride's, performed the ceremony.

== Filmography ==
=== Film ===
Year	Title	Role	Notes
1997	Poison Ivy: The New Seduction	Sandy	Direct to video
2000	The In Crowd	Brittany Foster	
2001	Going Greek	Wendy	
2001	Shallow Hal	Jill	
2002	Would I Lie to You?	Olivia	Direct to video
2005	Cruel World	Ashley	
2005	Two for the Money	Girl in sportscar	Uncredited
2007	Who's Your Caddy?	Mrs. Cummings	
2008	Toxic	Michelle	
2010	Order of Chaos	Tara	
2010	Costa Rican Summer	Aunt Carla	

=== Television ===
Year	Title	Role	Notes
1995	All My Children	Camille	Recurring role
1996	Malibu Shores	Bree	Main role, 10 episodes
1996	Hercules: The Legendary Journeys	Psyche	Episode: "The Green-Eyed Monster"
1997	Xena: Warrior Princess	Psyche	Episode: "A Comedy of Eros"
1997–1999	Sunset Beach	Megan "Meg" Cummings	Series regular,
2001	Men, Women & Dogs	Sandra	Episode: "A Fetching New Lawyer"
2002	Friends	Hayley	Episode: "The One with the Sharks"
2002	Boomtown	Layla French	Episode: "Blackout"
2004	Wild Things 2	Brittney Havers	Television film
2004	CSI: Miami	Ginger Wadley	Episode: "Hell Night"
2005	Play Dates	Nicole	Unsold television pilot
2005	CSI: Crime Scene Investigation	Tanya Rollins	Episode: "King Baby"
2005–2006	Just Legal	Kate Manat	Main role, 7 episodes
2006	Hollis & Rae	Juliette	Unsold television pilot
2006	Monk	Michelle Cullman	Episode: "Mr. Monk and the Actor"
2006	Dead and Deader	Holly	Television movie (Syfy)
2007	Women's Murder Club	Parris Donovan	Episode: "Play Through the Pain"
2008	Jack Hunter and the Lost Treasure of Ugarit	Liz	Television miniseries
2009	Criminal Minds	Julie Riley	Episode: "Conflicted"
2009–2011	Make It or Break It	Chloe Kmetko	Main role (seasons 1–2), 39 episodes
2012	Major Crimes	Annette Raber	Episode: "Before and After"
