= Tiverton, Ontario =

Tiverton
- Community
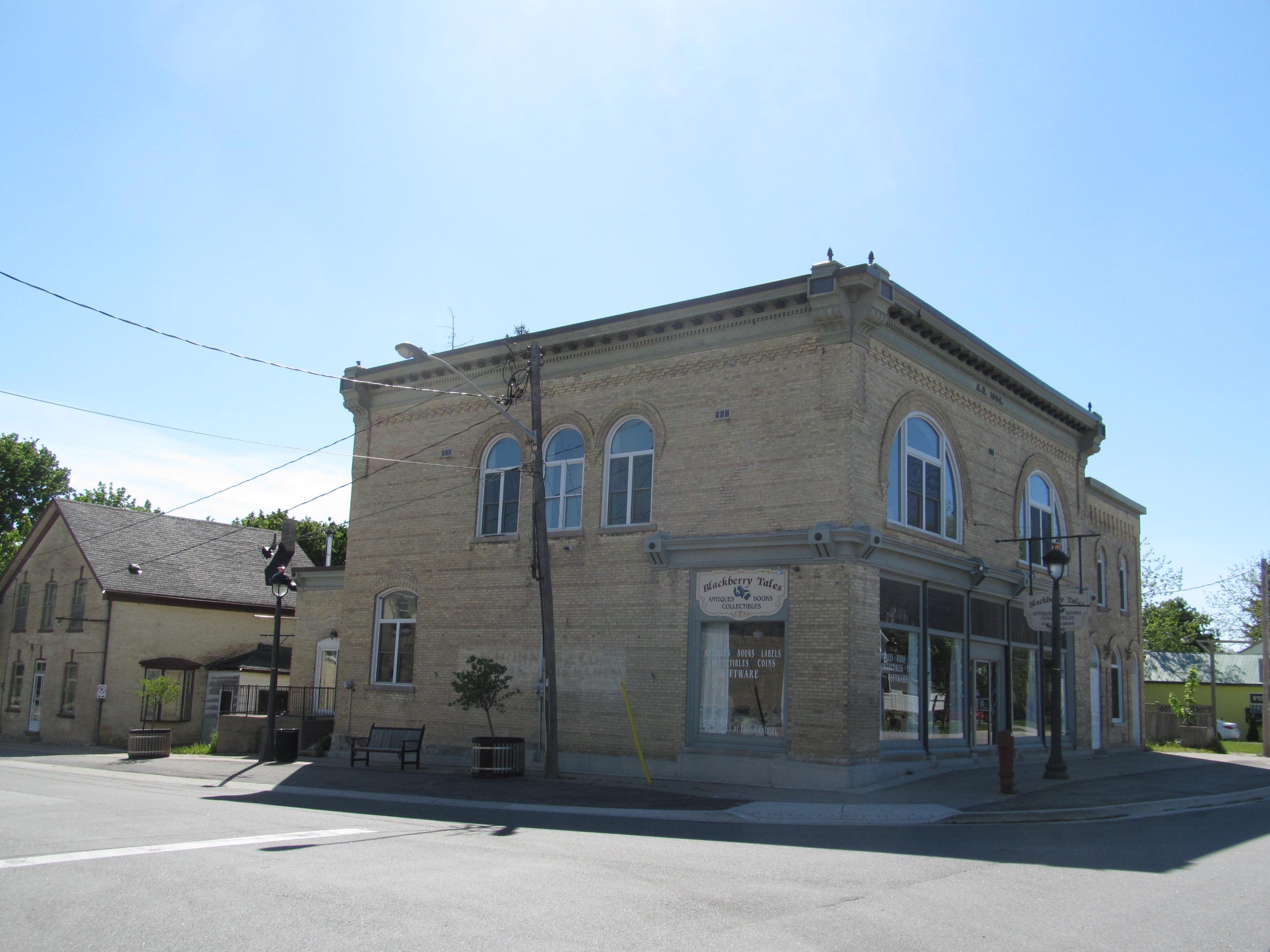

- Location in southern Ontario Tiverton (Southern Ontario)
- Coordinates: 44°16′03″N 81°32′36″W
- Country: Canada
- Province: Ontario
- County: Bruce
- Municipality: Kincardine
- Established: 1853

Area
  - Land: 2.26 km^{2} (0.87 sq mi)
- Elevation: 265 m (869 ft)

Population (2016)
  - Total: 725
  - Density: 320.1/km^{2} (829/sq mi)
- Time zone: UTC-5 (Eastern Time Zone)
  - Summer (DST): UTC-4 (Eastern Time Zone)
- Postal code FSA: N0G
- Area codes: 519, 226

Tiverton is a community in the Municipality of Kincardine, Bruce County, Ontario, Canada. It is near the shore of Lake Huron on Highway 21 between Port Elgin and Kincardine.

== History ==
The name of a town in Devon, England. It is said that Norman McInnis and the other petitioners, when applying for a post-office, suggested the name "St. Andrews." This the department would not agree to, there being another post-office of that name. Of several names offered "Tiverton" was chosen, it being the name of the borough for which Lord Palmerston, the English Prime Minister, sat in Parliament, and this no doubt had something to do with the choice made.

It was in the fall of 1850 that the primeval forest that covered the present site of Tiverton was entered by its first settler, Timothy Allan. The survey of the north part of Kincardine Township had just been completed, but that part of the township of Bruce in which Tiverton lies had not been commenced. For several years the work of clearing the bush went steadily on before the idea of a village at that spot was thought of. It was the fortune of the author, in the spring of 1857, to tramp along the "Boundary Line" from Inverhuron east to the fifteenth side-road, but he cannot recall of then seeing any evidence of the village that subsequently was developed.

It was, however, in the same year that Norman McInnis there opened a store, and it is probably the year which Tiverton may claim as that when it commenced to take form; but it was 1860 before it became known by the name it now bears, that is, when "Tiverton" was given as the name of the post-office then opened. The one store was the most suitable place for the office, so naturally the postmastership was given to Norman McInnis, of whom it may be said in passing, he, as much as anyone else, deserves the honor of being called the founder of the village.

He it was who opened the first store and also the first manufacturing industry of the place, which was a pot and pearl-ash factory, which he commenced to operate in September, 1860. The next industry added to this was a wool-carding mill run by A. McBain, which mill at a later date passed into the hands of James McLeod. About the end of the sixties a grist mill was added to the industries of the village, John McLeod being the miller. John Dewar, also, about the same time, opened a store, the second in Tiverton.

From this time, and for the next ten or twelve years Tiverton became somewhat of a market. The grain there purchased used to be delivered at one of the warehouses at Inverhuron; this business ceased with the burning of these warehouses in 1882, as they never were rebuilt. It was during these years the village attained to its highest notch as a business centre, and new industries were started, among which were a sawmill, a planing-mill and machine shop, but the largest and most prominent of them was John McDonald's tannery, which employed about twenty-five hands and had an output of about $20,000 worth of leather per annum.

== Demographics ==
In the 2021 Census of Population conducted by Statistics Canada, Tiverton had a population of 717 living in 313 of its 382 total private dwellings, a change of −1.1% from its 2016 population of 725. With a land area of 2.26 km^{2} (0.87 sq mi), it had a population density of 317.3/km^{2} (821.7/sq mi) in 2021.

== Economy ==
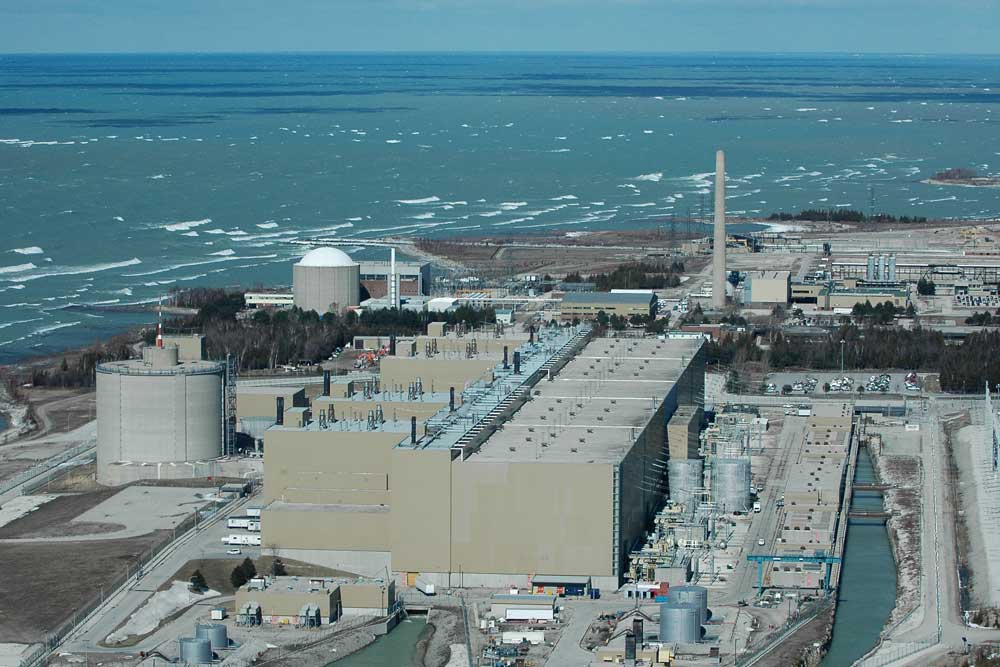
Bruce Nuclear employs many who live in the area

Bruce Nuclear Generating Station, the largest nuclear facility in North America in terms of output, is located in Tiverton.

Tiverton was home to the Steelback Brewery, which closed in 2010. There is a public Library, an arena and sports facility, and a fire department.

== Media ==
- The Kincardine Record - The Kincardine area's local newspaper.
- Cable television is provided by Rogers TV and Bruce Telecom
- CIYN-FM 95.5 "Shoreline Classics" - Kincardine and area's classic rock station
- CFPS-FM 97.9 "The Bruce" - local rock station broadcasting from Port Elgin, Ontario
- CKNX-FM 101.7 "The One" - local, regional and national news and adult contemporary music
- CIBU-FM 94.5 "The Bull" - local, regional and national news and classic rock music
- CKNX (AM) 920 - country music

== Bus Transportation ==
- First Student Canada (buses from Kincardine, Ontario) (for students bused to schools in Kincardine)
- Ross Young Bus Lines (buses from Tiverton, Ontario) (serving the Bruce County area)

== See also ==
- List of communities in Ontario
