= GFL Memorial Gardens =

Current home of the OHL's Sault Ste. Marie Greyhounds

Coordinates: 46°30′49″N 84°20′13″W

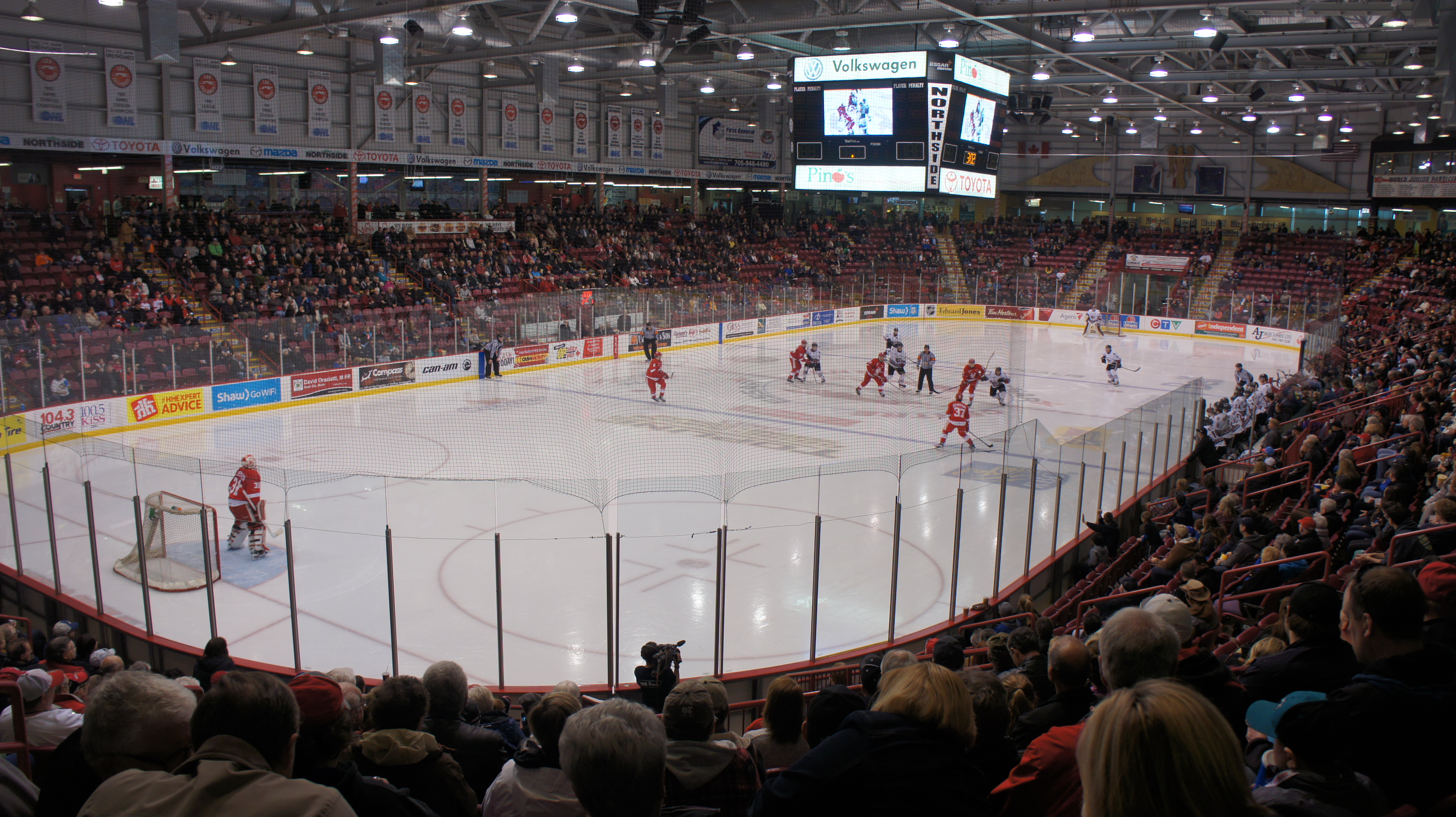

- Location within Ontario Location within Canada
- Former names: Steelback Centre (2006–2008); Essar Centre (2008–2018)
- Address: 269 Queen Street East; Sault Ste. Marie, Ontario; P6A 1Y9
- Owner: City of Sault Ste. Marie
- Operator: City of Sault Ste. Marie
- Capacity: 4,928 (hockey); 6,497 (center-stage concert); 5,524 (side-stage concert); 4,923 (end-stage concert); 3,143 (middle-stage concert, theater set-up)
- Surface: 200 ft × 85 ft (61 m × 26 m)

Construction
- Groundbreaking: June 6, 2005
- Opened: September 29, 2006
- Cost: $25 million ($37.6 million in 2025 dollars)
- Architects: PBK Architects; EPOH Inc.
- Structural engineers: M. R. Wright & Associates Co. Ltd.
- General contractor: Bondfield Construction Ltd. Co

Tenants
- Sault Ste. Marie Greyhounds (OHL) (2006–present); Sault Major Hockey Association (2006–present)

The GFL Memorial Gardens, formerly the Steelback Centre and Essar Centre, is a 4,928-seat sports and entertainment centre in downtown Sault Ste. Marie, Ontario, Canada. It opened on September 29, 2006, replacing the now demolished Sault Memorial Gardens. The new building was constructed directly next door to the former Memorial Gardens and incorporated its most distinctive feature, the Memorial Tower, into its plans. The block surrounding the arena is called "Memorial Square".

The Garden's primary tenant is the Sault Ste. Marie Greyhounds of the Ontario Hockey League.

== Structure ==
The main entrance to the facility is located in the north west corner of the building, adjacent to the Memorial Tower, in the corner where the box office is located.

=== Concourse level ===
There are major entrances to the concourse level from each of the four corners of the GFL Memorial Gardens. Located on the concourse level are four main concessions, as well as the Molson Canadian Hockey House restaurant, multiple beer stands, and a coffee vendor. On the west side of the concourse level is the Greyhounds merchandise store.

=== Event level ===
The event level of the Gardens houses all dressing rooms for players and officials, kitchen facilities, multi-purpose and break-out rooms, as well as technical, storage, and shipping and receiving functions. Also included on the event level is the Greyhounds' dressing room complex which is equipped with coaching and training rooms, weight rooms, showers, and physiotherapy areas.

=== Suite level ===
The suite level of the Gardens houses 13 private suites, a VIP room located on the north end, media and broadcasting rooms, and administration offices for both the Greyhounds Hockey Club and City of Sault Ste. Marie staff. Private suites ranging in seating size from six to ten persons. The VIP Room seats 60 people.

=== Features ===
The Gardens includes a $500,000 scoreboard with an installed video component with live broadcast (up to five cameras), replay and TV capability. Wireless internet access is available throughout the facility. The facility also includes a state-of-the-art $250,000 sound system.

=== External features ===
The block on which the Gardens is located is named "Memorial Square", as it is located on the grounds of the former Sault Memorial Gardens, the Greyhounds' former home. Memorial Square features the Memorial Tower, the last standing remnant of the former Gardens; the tower was preserved and refurbished after the previous Gardens was demolished in the summer of 2006.

The sidewalk in front of the GFL Memorial Garden's north end (facing Queen Street) features the Sault Ste Marie Walk of Fame, a series of markers honouring those from the Sault Ste Marie area who have made significant contributions to the community or their chosen field of work. The Walk of Fame was formally unveiled on September 30, 2006, during the grand opening weekend.

== Naming rights ==
=== Steelback Brewery ===
Naming rights to the new building were purchased by Steelback Brewery of Tiverton for $1.35 million over ten years. The proposal was approved by Sault Ste. Marie's city council on May 29, 2006, in a 9–1 vote.

The City of Sault Ste. Marie, in conjunction with Steelback, held an official logo unveiling for the Steelback Centre on Saturday August 26, 2006, at the Roberta Bondar Pavilion in Sault Ste. Marie. There the new logo was officially unveiled, along with a list of upcoming shows.

In November 2007, Steelback Brewery filed for bankruptcy protection and defaulted on its second payment of $135,000 to the city. Ward 1 Councillor James Caicco was quoted in the January 17, 2008, Sault Star as saying, "nothing can be done until the court creditors protection process with Steelback Brewery is completed. If Steelback comes out of court protection as a restructured company, then we still have a contract with them. If it declares bankruptcy, options will be presented to city council that include searching for a new naming rights sponsor." Steelback later terminated its deal with the city and the search for a new sponsor commenced.

=== Essar Steel Algoma Inc. ===
On July 23, 2008, the City of Sault Ste. Marie, along with Essar Steel Algoma executives held a press conference to announce that Essar Steel Algoma Inc. had purchased the naming rights to the new downtown entertainment facility. This deal had been rumored for weeks, but only confirmed a day before by a source to the Sault Star. The deal was worth $1.5 million for 10 years, and unlike the first contract with Steelback Brewery, the amount was paid upfront in a lump sum, instead of yearly payments. Essar also paid for all new signage for the facility as part of the deal. Jamie Caicco, councillor and chair of the sports and entertainment committee for the facility told reporters that 6–7 companies showed interest in becoming the new naming rights sponsor when the invitation was first sent out looking for a new name.

=== GFL Environmental Inc. ===
In May 2018, it was announced that GFL Environmental had signed a 10-year, $750,000 deal for the naming rights, beginning August 1, 2018. The arena was renamed GFL Memorial Gardens.

== Notable events ==
On October 11, 2006, Ontario Hockey League commissioner David Branch announced that the 2008 OHL All-Star Classic had been awarded to the Greyhounds and the City of Sault Ste. Marie. The game was played at the Steelback Centre on February 6, 2008, with the Eastern Conference squad defeating the West in a shootout, 8–7.

The Essar Centre hosted the 2010 Scotties Tournament of Hearts, Canada's women's curling championships.

In January 2010, The Essar Centre was a part of the Olympic Torch Relay. The Centre hosted the torch as it made its way across Canada and the world on its way to the 2010 Vancouver Winter Olympic Games.

The Essar Centre hosted the CARHA world cup in March 2012. The tournament features the top recreation hockey teams from around the world and is held every four years.

The GFL Memorial Gardens has played host to a number of popular musical acts including Jerry Seinfeld, Sir Elton John, KISS, Mötley Crüe, John Mellencamp, Neil Young, Tom Cochrane & Red Rider, Hilary Duff, Three Days Grace, Seether, Gordon Lightfoot with Stompin' Tom Conners, Blue Rodeo, Hedley, Billy Talent with Alexisonfire, Against Me!, The Cancer Bats, The Used, Default, Jackyl, Slaughter, The Backstreet Boys, Girlicious, Blue Man Group, Charley Pride, Bryan Adams, Sheryl Crow, Anne Murray, INXS, The Tragically Hip, Barenaked Ladies, Down, Heaven & Hell, Megadeth, Jeff Dunham, The Wiggles, Bachman-Cummings, and Heart.

In April 2013, the arena hosted the Telus Cup, Canada's midget hockey championship.

On October 5, 2016, the Essar Centre hosted an NHL preseason game between the Buffalo Sabres and the Carolina Hurricanes, which the Hurricanes won by a score of 3-2.

== Gallery ==
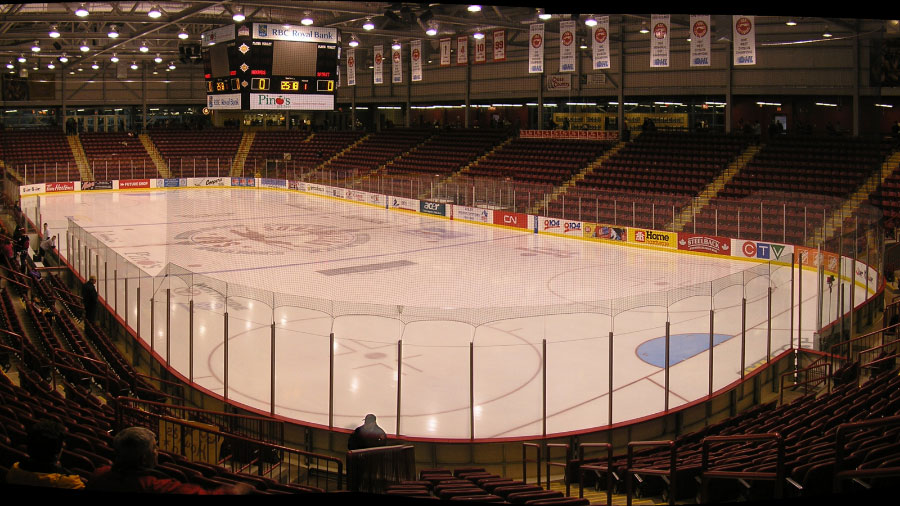
Interior of GFL Memorial Gardens, showing hockey rink.

Inside the GFL Memorial Gardens on Wednesday September 27, 2006, two days before Grand Opening Ceremonies.

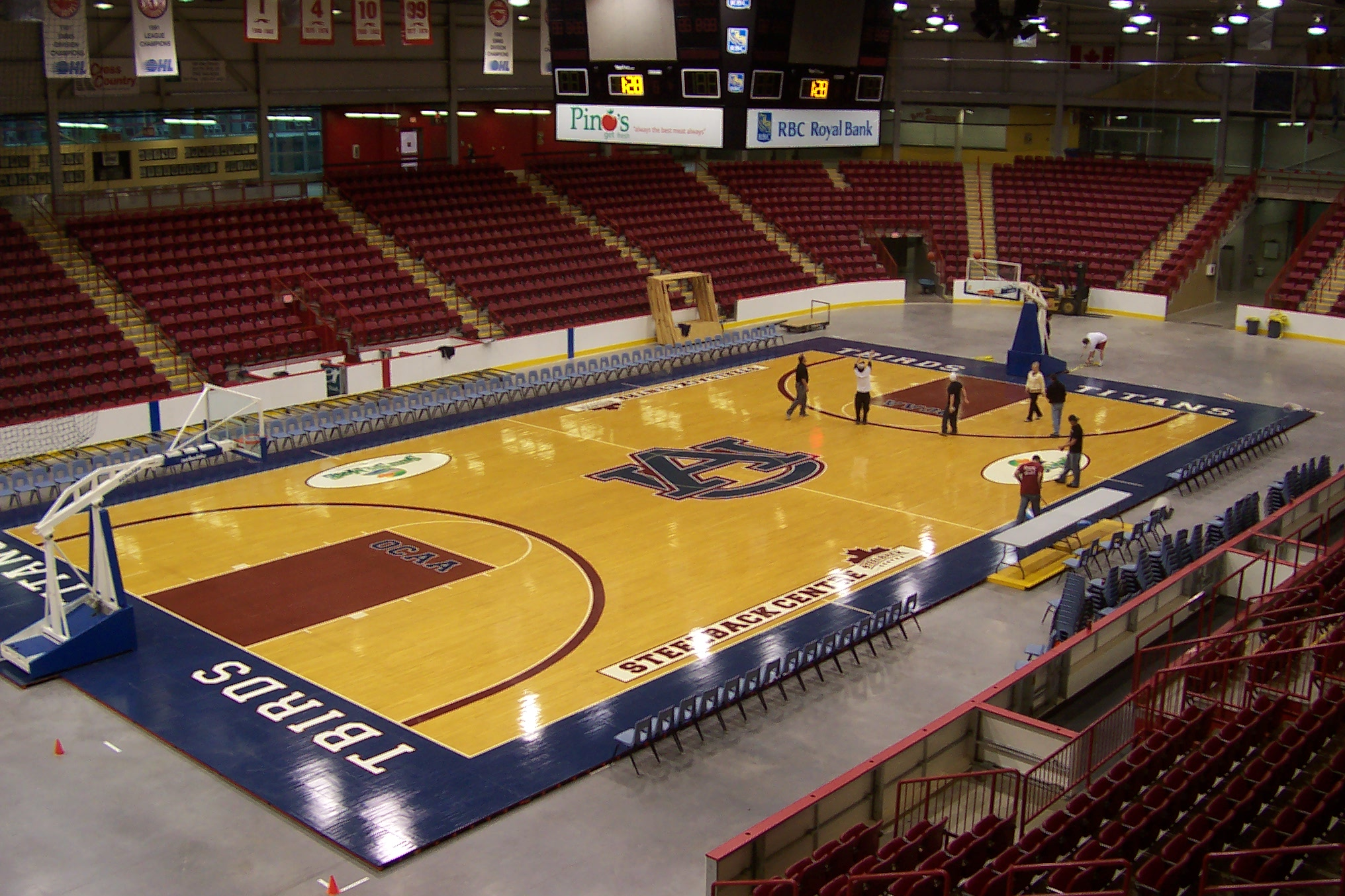
Interior of GFL Memorial Gardens, setting up for Basketball.

Memorial Tower.

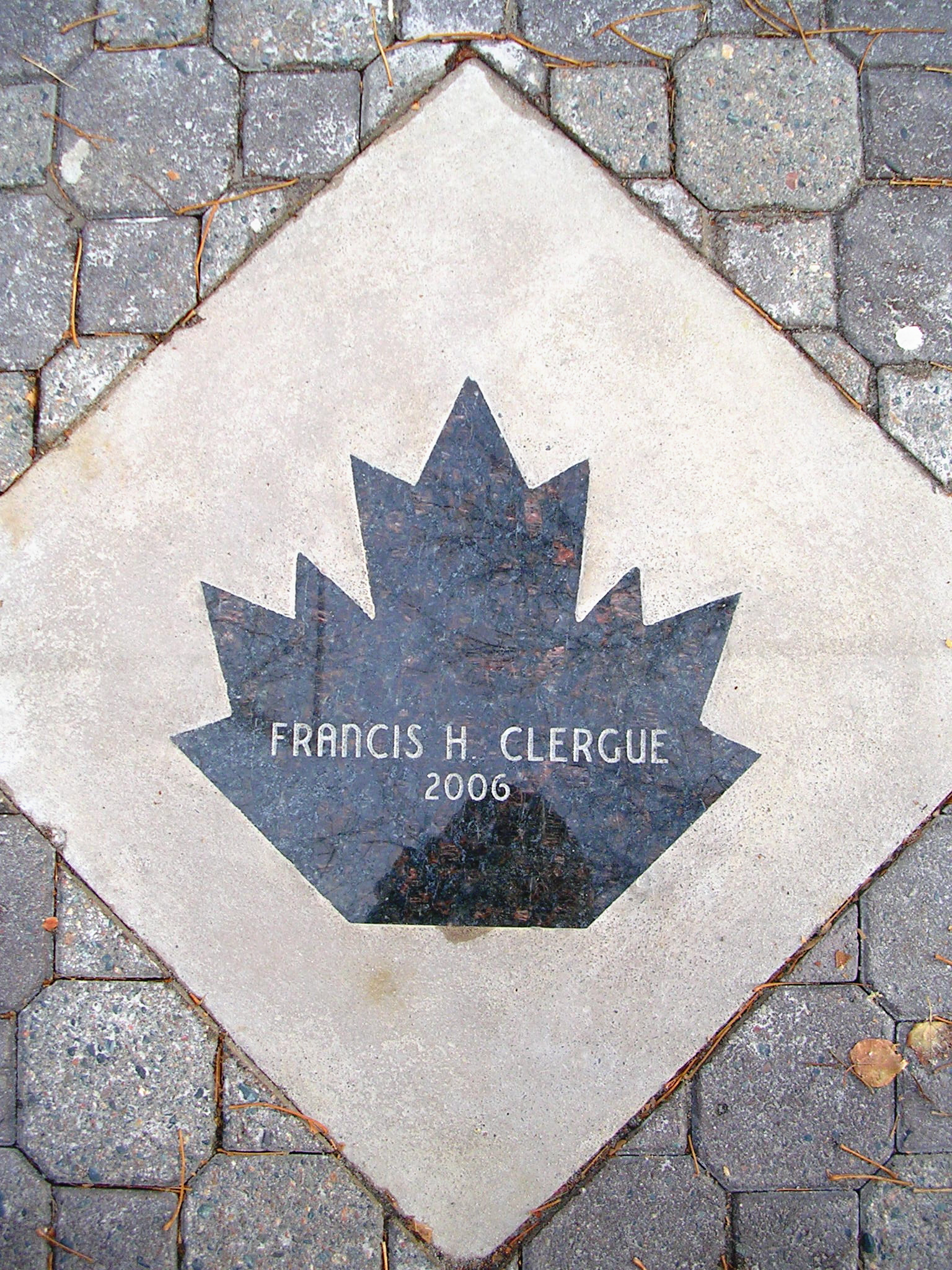
Francis Clergue's marker on the Walk of Fame.

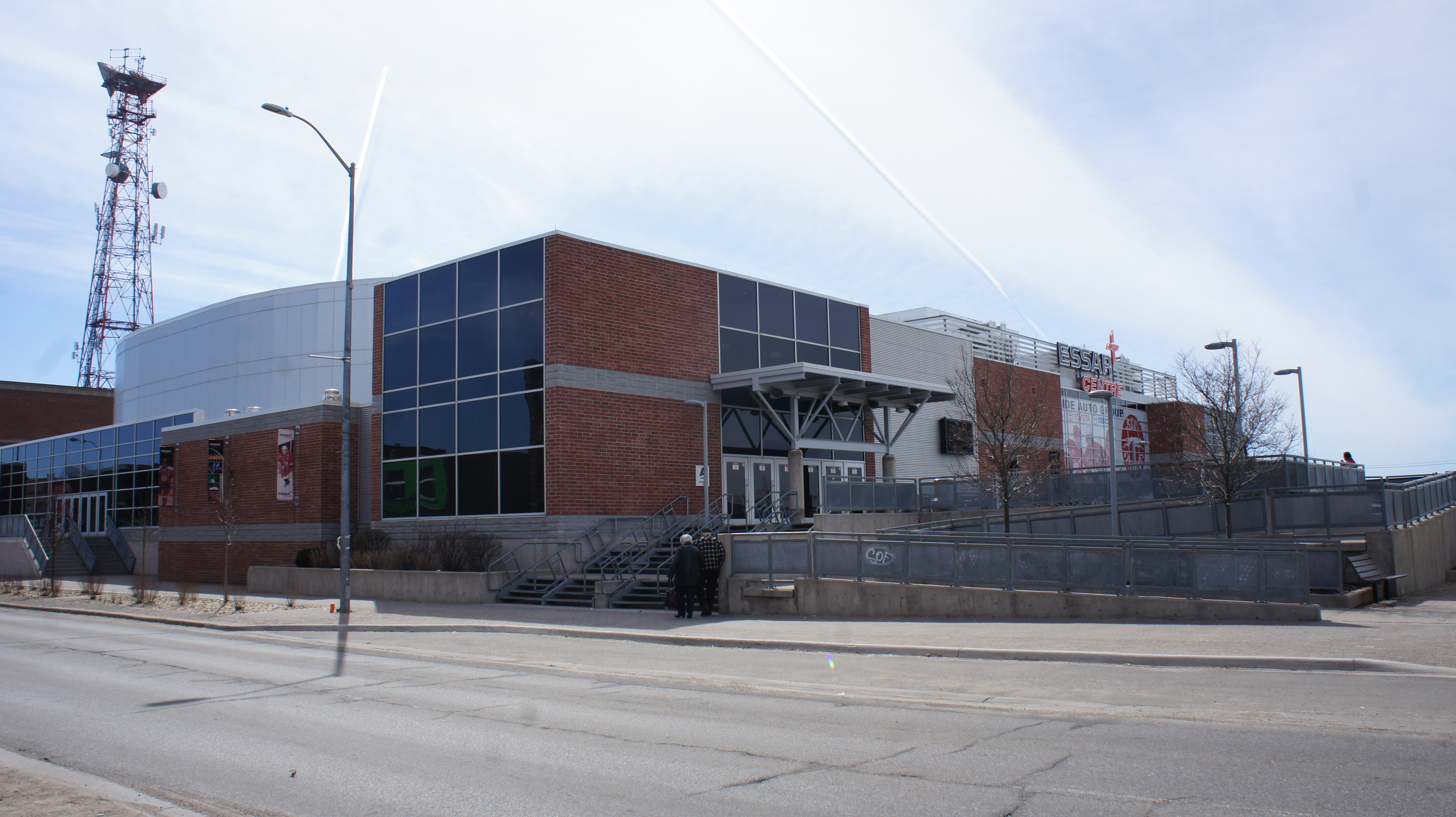
Exterior of the Gardens
