= Frank D'Angelo =

Canadian entrepreneur

- Born: April 23, 1959 (age 67); Toronto, Ontario, Canada
- Occupations: Entrepreneur, singer-songwriter, filmmaker, actor, television host
- Known for: D'Angelo Brands, Inc. Steelback Brewery; Forget About It Supper Club; In Your Ear Productions

Frank D'Angelo (born April 23, 1959) is a Canadian entrepreneur, singer-songwriter, filmmaker, actor, and television host. He is best known for founding D'Angelo Brands and the now-defunct Steelback Brewery.

He is also known for his work in the entertainment industry, first as a singer and song writer who has 18 studio albums, then as the host of The Being Frank Show, a weekly self-produced late night talk show which aired in Ontario on Hamilton's Super Station CHCH-TV for 13 seasons and was available across Canada on Bell Satellite TV and most cable TV providers. He is also a filmmaker who has released several feature-length films through his In Your Ear Productions.

== Early life ==
D'Angelo was born in Toronto to Italian immigrants Giuseppe and Carmela D'Angelo. His father owned Napoli Foods. The younger D'Angelo showed an interest in business at an early age: at age 9 he outsourced his newspaper delivery of the Toronto Telegram to other children. He had many sales positions, sometimes concurrently. He purchased his first home at age 20. D'Angelo started in the food industry working for his father until Napoli was sold to Saputo.

== Business career ==
=== Food and beverage interests ===
==== D'Angelo brands ====
D'Angelo is founder and president of D'Angelo Brands, Inc., which produces and markets beverages and some canned food items in Canada. It started in 1986 by selling apple juice door-to-door, and the company quickly grew to success with the financial backing of Canadian politician Al Palladini. His company filed for credit protection in late 2007. On February 16, 2008, a numbered company owned by D'Angelo's family bought back D'Angelo Brands. Cheetah Power Surge is an energy drink produced by D'Angelo Brands. In one commercial, he interviewed Ben Johnson in a pretend talk show titled 'Being Frank', which would later become the title of his actual talk show.

==== Steelback ====
In September 2002, he started and was the CEO of Steelback Brewery. Steelback commercials from 2002 to 2007 always starred Frank D'Angelo and presented him as a known celebrity (although he was relatively unknown) and the face of Steelback. He has said that "I am the Brand". Steelback invested around $15M per year on advertising. The ads were often shown in high-cost slots during Hockey Night In Canada broadcasts. Hockey related spots starred him and hockey celebrities such as Shayne Corson, Darcy Tucker and Phil Esposito. He was replaced after the company's financial problems in late 2007. By 2010, the Steelback Brewery was closed.

D'Angelo was criticized for his running of Steelback after reportedly racking up more than $120 million in debt, largely for advertising campaigns featuring himself with sports celebrities, before filing for bankruptcy protection from Steelback's list of more than 400 creditors, including Bernard Sherman's Apotex, Mike Cecere's advertising and marketing firms, the Toronto Argos, the Ottawa 67's, bars, small market teams and sports clubs and a few charities. When Steelback went into receivership, D'Angelo had continued to spend $15 million per year on advertising despite only taking in revenues of $3 million per year. He owed more than $100 million, plus another $20 million plus, to Barry Sherman's Wasanda Enterprises alone.

Canadian Business magazine described the Steelback operation as "a mistake from start to finish" not only due to mismanagement on the marketing front but poor packaging choices and the inconsistent quality of its beers.

==== Restaurateur ====
D'Angelo owned the Forget About It Supper Club restaurant on King Street in Toronto. He taped his talk show, The Being Frank Show with Frank D'Angelo in its basement, which he had turned into a studio, for five seasons before moving to his InYourEar Studios in Mississauga for another eight seasons. The restaurant has since closed. D'Angelo had owned it for 17 years.

=== Sports ===
In 2006, the company purchased the naming rights to the Steelback Centre in Sault Ste. Marie, the new home of the Ontario Hockey League Sault Ste. Marie Greyhounds for $1.35 million over 10 years, a fee that went largely unpaid.

In early 2006 he expressed interest in reviving the Canadian Football League's Ottawa Renegades and renaming them the Ottawa Steelbacks but the league rejected him as an owner, with media speculating it was because he was "egotistical" and a "shameless publicity hound".

On December 18, 2006, D'Angelo declared an interest in buying the Pittsburgh Penguins NHL hockey team with his partner Barry Sherman.

In 2011, D'Angelo sparred with MMA fighter Francis Carmont, and a segment about the fight aired on Being Frank.

In March 2012, D'Angelo launched a sports-themed media website called Next Sport Star where he hosts a weekly show with Hockey Hall of Fame inductee Phil Esposito and former Toronto Maple Leafs assistant general manager Bill Watters. The site was backed by the late Canadian pharmaceutical billionaire Bernard Sherman, who also backed D'Angelo in his Steelback Brewery enterprise.

== Politics ==
After Toronto's Mayor John Tory stepped down in February, 2023, D'Angelo issued a press release announcing that he would be running in the 2023 Toronto mayoral by-election. His announced platform included six issues: improving the city's infrastructure, improving the city's transit system, improving climate change, getting homelessness to a much better place, increasing affordable housing, and improving the city's safety.

He finished 26th out of a record field of 102 candidates, with 343 votes (0.05%), in the election on June 26. That night he tweeted to thank his supporters and congratulate his fellow candidates including the winner, Olivia Chow.

== Entertainment ==
=== Music ===
==== Live performances ====
D'Angelo, whose musical idol is Gino Vannelli, toured Canada in 1978, singing with his band.

D'Angelo is currently the singer for his 24-piece band self named, formerly named after his former brewery Steelback, which includes Mike Reno from Loverboy.

In February, 2007, he performed with the Steelback 2-4 at the Casino Sault Ste. Marie after a charity hockey game sponsored by the Steelback brewery.

He has performed the opening anthem and other songs at Toronto Argonauts CFL games which were sponsored by his company Steelback Brewery. At a July 26, 2007 home loss against the Montreal Alouettes he was booed while performing the national anthem and jeered again during his halftime show with The Steelback 2-4, D'Angelo later issued an apology for the performance, which toronto.com described as a "staggeringly atonal" rendition by a "Vegas lounge act" in its list of "Five off-key versions of the Canadian anthem at sporting events".

He released a recording of "Silent Night" in November 2009, with an RnB vocal style. Profits from sales went to support Toronto charities which help the homeless. D'Angelo has also been an active volunteer to help the city's homeless.

On April 29, 2010, he held the Frank D'Angelo Benefit Concert at Hugh's Room in Toronto to benefit Haitian relief experts, featuring a special audience address by Phil Esposito.

On Saturday, June 18. 2011, D'Angelo and his band performed live at the HMV store in Woodbridge, Ontario.

On February 7, 2014, Frank D'Angelo and his band performed live at his Forget About It Supper Club in Toronto.

In August, 2014 he performed at Taste of the Danforth, a food festival in Greek town in Toronto's east end.

On April 16, 2016 D'Angelo and the Steelback 2-4 performed at the Seneca Queen Theatre in Niagara Falls, in support of screenings of his film Sicilian Vampire in the same space.

==== Albums and videos ====
Frank D'Angelo and the Steelback 2-4's first album, You Gotta Believe to Believe, raised funds for victims of Hurricane Katrina, the Breast Cancer Society and the Hospital for Sick Children and came out in 2007. On May 21, 2009, they announced the release of their second album Full Circle with nine original songs and four cover tunes. D'Angelo has to date released 18 studio albums including 150+ original songs written by him. His music is on Spotify, Apple and digital platforms worldwide. D'Angelo's music is distributed by Sony Orchard. D'Angelo also has a YouTube channel, frankdangelomusic, where all his music videos and movie trailers are available.

=== Television ===
In November 2010, D'Angelo purchased airtime on a number of Canadian television stations to launch his The Being Frank Show, which usually broadcast on Friday nights at 11:30pm. The show premiered November 5, 2010 on CHCH TV in Hamilton, Ontario. The show is interspersed with "commercial timeouts" which also feature D'Angelo promoting his D'Angelo Brands products, and other related products.

D'Angelo also hosts NSS Live an internet live broadcast show on nextsportstar.com, broadcast Tuesdays and Thursdays from 3pm to 5pm, and featuring Phil Esposito, Bill Watters and other guests.

=== Radio ===
D'Angelo hosts a one hour radio show on the Jewel Radio network across Canada, on Sunday from 6pm to 7pm. It's on temporary hiatus.

=== Movies ===
He has written, produced, directed, scored and starred in nine feature-length films through his company, In Your Ear Productions. Distribution is through iTunes, Amazon and various video on demand platforms worldwide. Canadian & American cable companies. His first film Real Gangsters was released in 2013. Followed by The Big Fat Stone and No Deposit. In 2015, he released the horror drama film Sicilian Vampire. This was followed by The Red Maple Leaf in 2016. D'Angelo completed his sixth feature film The Neighborhood, which premiered June 15, 2017, in Toronto at the Italian Contemporary Film Festival. His seventh film, The Joke Thief co-starring Steven Kerzner (Ed the Sock), Frank's former sidekick on Being Frank, was released in 2018, followed by The Last Big Save, and Making a Deal with the Devil, both in 2019.

Also in 2019, he appeared in a supporting acting role in Kire Paputts' film The Last Porno Show.

==== Style and approach ====
D'Angelo is a self-trained film maker. He shoots on a very tight shooting schedule, often using multiple cameras and angles, allowing him to shoot close-ups and wide shots in the same take. He employs a recurring cast of actors including Tony Nardi, Daniel Baldwin, Jason Blicker, John Ashton, Alyson Court, and Art Hindle. He also tends to uses big name guest stars. Past films have included Margot Kidder, James Caan, Paul Sorvino and Martin Landau.

==== Criticism ====
D'Angelo utilizes four wall distribution, and small releases in region theater chains, wherein he and/or co-investors (notably his friend/business partner Barry Sherman) pay to both produce his films and also rent select large market movie screens on which to screen them. Some former Hollywood stars' expenses were paid with cash to appear alongside D'Angelo in what Cracked.com describes as "the world's most expensive celebrity selfie". He also submits his films to various indie film festivals which have questionable legitimacy; for example, he has won 14 awards at the Action on Film Film Festival. For his methods, D'Angelo has been described as a "particularly egregious" character in the industry.

Some critics have savaged his film Sicilian Vampire.

===== James Caan =====
After appearing in D'Angelo's Sicilian Vampire, James Caan did not attend its premiere and later claimed he only worked for the "dubiously talented" filmmaker out of a desperate need for cash caused by legal issues related to his divorce. Caan referred to his appearance in the movie as a humiliation in court, saying he'd rather die broke than be reduced to doing another D'Angelo film. However, he did in fact later appear in another D'Angelo feature two years later, 2017's The Red Maple Leaf.

== Controversies ==
=== Sexual assault allegations ===
On June 9, 2007, D'Angelo was arrested in the alleged sexual assault of the 21-year-old daughter of a business associate. He admitted to having had sexual intercourse with the woman but claimed she initiated it, and was acquitted on April 21, 2009. Justice John Hamilton said he found the evidence of both D'Angelo and his accuser credible. But in handing down his ruling, Hamilton added D'Angelo "may be" or is "probably" guilty of the crime.

==== Obstruction of Justice allegations ====
Several days after being acquitted, D'Angelo hosted a party at his Forget About It Supper Club. An Ontario Provincial Police surveillance team took photographs showing veteran Ontario Provincial Police sergeant Michael Rutigliano, and two crown attorneys, Richard Bennett and Domenic Basile, present at the same celebration. On May 14, Rutigliano was charged with attempting to influence the outcome of the case. He was accused of conspiring with D'Angelo to obstruct the prosecution of the case. D'Angelo was charged the next day with conspiring to obstruct justice and obstructing justice. He was to appear in court on June 8, 2009, in Brampton, and his case was adjourned until May 31, 2010. On September 2, 2010, the obstruction charges against D'Angelo were stayed permanently.

=== Libel suit ===
In June 2007, D'Angelo launched a $2 million libel suit against blogger Neate Sager for an unrelated posting on Sager's blog site. D'Angelo dropped the suit when Sager posted an apology.

=== Mike Zigomanis lawsuit ===
After former Toronto Maple Leafs player Mike Zigomanis was demoted to the club's minor league affiliate, and nude photos he had sent to an ex-girlfriend surfaced online, D'Angelo released Zigomanis as a "brand ambassador" for Cheetah energy drinks citing the morals clause in his contract. Zigomanis sued D'Angelo for breach of contract and won a $262,500 settlement in November 2016.

=== Death of Barry Sherman ===
D'Angelo has been cited as a potential suspect in the unsolved murder of his long-time business partner Barry Sherman. In an October 2018 Bloomberg News article, D'Angelo said "The worst thing that could have happened to Frank D'Angelo is Barry dying" and expressed regret that he had not been able to save a man he regarded as a close friend.
