= Steelback Brewery =

Brewery, in Tiverton, Ontario, Canada

- Founded: 2004
- Defunct: 2010
- Headquarters: Tiverton, Ontario, Canada

Steelback Brewery was a Canadian brewery located in Tiverton, Ontario, on the shores of Lake Huron.

== History ==
=== Beginning ===
The roots of Steelback Brewery begin in September 2002, with businessman Frank D'Angelo looking for expansion space for his juice company, D'Angelo Brands. He found a site in Tiverton, Ontario, for sale by Barry Sherman, founder of Apotex. The facility came with a brewery which D'Angelo had intended to sell, but ultimately decided to start a beer company with the funding of Sherman.

A wholly owned subsidiary of D'Angelo Brands, Steelback started selling beer in February 2004, launched with an expensive local television ad on the Super Bowl XXXVIII broadcast.

The company's promotional strategy included extensive sponsorship of sporting events and venues, including purchasing naming rights to the Sauble Speedway in Sauble Beach, several community arenas in Toronto, the Grand Prix of Toronto and sponsorship of a Formula One racing team, as well as the Toronto Argonauts.

In 2006, the company purchased the naming rights to the Steelback Centre in Sault Ste. Marie, the new home of the Ontario Hockey League Sault Ste. Marie Greyhounds for $1.35 million over 10 years, a fee that went largely unpaid. That same year, the company explored reviving the defunct Ottawa Renegades of the Canadian Football League, under the new name Ottawa Steelback. There was speculation that the bid to resurrect the Ottawa Renegades was nothing more than a publicity stunt, and the offer was declined by the CFL.

=== Bankruptcy ===
In November 2007, D'Angelo sold his majority stake in both Steelback and D'Angelo Brands to minority partner Barry Sherman, though D'Angelo remained as chairman of both, holding a minority interest. Later that month, citing poor revenue, high marketing costs and the weak Canadian dollar, D'Angelo announced that both Steelback and D'Angelo Brands had filed for bankruptcy protection.

In early 2008, it was revealed that Steelback and D'Angelo Brands owed Sherman's Wasanda Enterprises Inc. $101.2 million at the time of D'Angelo's "choosing" to sell his stake. D'Angelo was cut out of both companies, with Sherman citing the flamboyant former owner's extravagant spending on advertising (which alone exceeded revenues), as well as the poor quality of the beer that D'Angelo had been producing at Steelback.

=== Relaunch ===
In May 2008, Steelback emerged from bankruptcy protection, with Barry Sherman appointing his son, Jonathon Sherman, the official owner and CEO of Steelback. As part of the overall changes, the brewery elevated former vice president of sales Ian MacDonald to the position of president and appointed Jayne McGillivray as brewmaster. Steelback switched gears from the flashy prime time ad campaigns to a more local and minimalist approach though print, radio, and billboard advertisements in six Ontario markets: their home of Bruce County; the Greater Toronto Area; Ottawa; London; Hamilton;and Windsor.

As part of the relaunch, Steelback added an image of the Kincardine lighthouse, a Bruce County landmark, to its packaging. D'Angelo's money-losing plastic bottle company had been sold, with an outside company contracted to bottle the beer in standard brown bottles. Local ingredients were used when possible, with an aim to provide "craft beer at mainstream prices".

On March 21, 2009, Steelback received the Sobey's Business of the Year Award, presented by the Kincardine Chamber of Commerce.

=== Closure ===
In July 2009, company president Ian MacDonald left the brewery, followed later in the month by 35 of Steelback's 39 staff members being laid off. Owner Jonathan Sherman cited low sales as the reason for the changes.

In January 2010, the remaining staff members were issued letters of termination and the brewery was quietly shut down with no official announcement.

== Products ==
At the time of closure, Steelback's six beers included Steelback Premium Lager, Steelback Tiverton Honey Brown, Steelback Premium Draught, Steelback Tiverton Dark, and Steelback Light, and only on draught, the Steelback Red Maple.

== Awards ==
2007 Ontario Brewing Awards

- HONEY BEER CATEGORY– GOLD MEDAL – Steelback Tiverton Bear Honey Brown
- DARK LAGER CATEGORY– GOLD MEDAL – Steelback Tiverton Bear Dark Lager
- LAGER CATEGORY – SILVER MEDAL – Steelback Red
- LAGER CATEGORY– BRONZE MEDAL – Steelback Silver

2007 Canadian Brewing Awards

- NORTH AMERICAN STYLE DARK LAGER CATEGORY– GOLD – Steelback Dark Lager
- HONEY/MAPLE LAGER OR ALE CATEGORY– SILVER – Steelback Honey Brown
- LIGHT (Calorie Reduced) LAGER CATEGORY – BRONZE – Steelback Light

2008 Ontario Brewing Awards

- DARK LAGER CATEGORY– GOLD MEDAL – Steelback Tiverton Bear Dark Lager

2009 Ontario Brewing Awards

- HONEY BEER CATEGORY - GOLD MEDAL - Steelback Red Maple
- DARK BEER CATEGORY - SILVER MEDAL - Steelback Tiverton Dark
