= Primal Rage (film) =

- Directed by: Vittorio Rambaldi
- Written by: Umberto Lenzi; James Justice
- Produced by: William J. Immermann; Josi W. Konski
- Starring: Patrick Lowe; Cheryl Arutt; Sarah Buxton; Bo Svenson
- Cinematography: Antonio Climati
- Edited by: John Rawson
- Music by: Claudio Simonetti
- Production company: El Pico S.A.
- Release dates: December 1, 1988 (Rome, Italy)
- Running time: 91 minutes
- Countries: United States; Italy
- Language: English

Primal Rage is a 1988 Italian science fiction horror film directed by Vittorio Rambaldi.

== Plot ==
Frank Duffy, a reporter for a local newspaper in Miami, sneaks into a research laboratory that carries out experiments on animals. Bitten by a rabid monkey, the young man falls prey to an uncontrollable fury and spreads the infection in the nearby college, where the carefree Halloween party taking place there turns into a bloodbath.

== Cast ==
- Patrick Lowe as Sam Nash
- Cheryl Arutt as Lauren Daly
- Sarah Buxton as Debbie
- Bo Svenson as Ethridge

== Production ==
The film was directed by Vittorio Rambaldi (in his directing debut), the son of Italian special effects artist Carlo Rambaldi.

The film was written by Umberto Lenzi and James Justice. Lenzi would later recall that he was approached with two scripts, saying that "One was fucking awful and one wasn't bad." Lenzi "took the one [he] liked the most", "about a female scientist that has an accident in her lab and becomes genetically mutated, transforming into a tiger", and rewrote it, but by the time he arrived at the United States, he found that his backers wanted him to film the other script, which became Nightmare Beach (also known as Welcome to Spring Break). The script that Lenzi worked on, which he described as a homage to Cat People, was eventually further rewritten by Justice, and the final script that was shot was credited to "Harry Kirkpatrick", an alias Justice also used in Nightmare Beach, in which he also worked on.

The film was shot in Florida.

The film's poster art was made by Renato Casaro.

== Release and reception ==
Primal Rage was released in Rome, Italy on December 1, 1989 by Columbia Tri-Star Films Italia s.r.l.

It was released direct-to-video in the United States. It was released on VHS initially and later on DVD by Code Red on July 13, 2010.

In February 1991, "Lor." of Variety described the film as "an excuse" for Carlo Rambaldi and his son to present some imaginative gore and monster makeup effects." The reviewer found that "Vottorio Rambaldi directs competently and with a mastery of direct-sound English dialog (a must for these hybrid productions)." They described the cast as predominantly being "unknowns" who were unimpressive.

Joseph A. Ziemba and Dan Budnik in their book Bleeding Skull!: A 1980s Trash-Horror Odyssey of the film, "Primal Rage borrows the plot and general sense of chaos from George Romero's The Crazies, gives it a shot of Cro-Magnon idiocy, and adds a "Avoid the Noid!" poster, an A.L.F. stuffed animal, and a relentless z-rate metal soundtrack. Leapfrogging over mundane hilarity (padding that involves racquetball), squirm-inducing gore (eyes ripped out) and the savoir fare of the late 80s (skull costumes from The Karate Kid), Primal Rage does not ask much from its audience. All we have to do is keep our eyes open."
