= Devil's Highway =

Devil's Highway or The Devil's Highway may refer to:

== Roads ==
- Devil's Highway (New Mexico) or U.S. Route 491, from its former designation as U.S. Route 666 New Mexico, Colorado and Utah (USA)
- Devil's Highway (Roman Britain), the Roman road from Londinium (London) to Calleva Atrebatum (Silchester)
- Devil's Highway (Sonora), also called El Camino del Diablo, a prehistoric and colonial trail through the Sonora Desert in Arizona (USA) and Sonora (Mexico)
- Route A666 in England, nicknamed the "Devil's Highway" both because of the number 666 and the road's high accident rate

== Arts entertainment, and media ==
- Devil's Highway (film), a 2005 horror film directed by Fabien Pruvot
- The Devil's Highway: A True Story (2004), Luís Alberto Urrea's non-fiction book that describes the May 2001 attempt of 26 men to cross the Mexican border into the US through the southern Arizona desert, a region known as the Devil's Highway

== See also ==
- Devil's Causeway, the Roman Road along Hadrian's Wall
