= Sarah G. Buxton =

American actress

- Born: Sarah Galbraith Buxton; March 23, 1965 (age 61); California, U.S.
- Occupation: Actress
- Years active: 1983–present
- Spouse: Shane Brolly (2006–present)
- Children: 1

Sarah Galbraith Buxton (born March 23, 1965) is an American actress. She has appeared in films including Lovelines (1984), The Sure Thing (1985) and Less than Zero (1987), as well as guest starring in a number of television shows in her early career. On television, Buxton is best known for playing Annie Douglas Richards in the NBC soap opera Sunset Beach from 1997 to 1999. She later played Morgan DeWitt, on The Bold and the Beautiful (2000–01, 2005).

== Career ==
Buxton was a competitive gymnast in her youth, until being "discovered" at the grocery store when she was about 15. In early 1980s, she began appearing on television and films. She guest-starred on Simon & Simon, 21 Jump Street, Who's the Boss?, The Fresh Prince of Bel-Air, China Beach and Walker, Texas Ranger. She also has appeared in a number of films, include Lovelines (1984), The Sure Thing (1985), Less than Zero (1987), Rock 'n' Roll High School Forever (1991), and Don't Tell Mom the Babysitter's Dead (1991).

Buxton is primarily known for her performance in the NBC daytime soap opera Sunset Beach, which aired from January 6, 1997 to December 31, 1999. Buxton was an original cast member and remained with the show for its entire run, playing the villainess Annie Douglas Richards, For her portrayal of Annie, Buxton was nominated in the category of "Outstanding Villainess" at the 1998 Soap Opera Digest Awards. Justine Elias of The New York Times said Buxton and co-star Leslie Anne Down showed signs of "becoming a classic matchup of battling soap opera vixens" in the respective roles of Annie and Olivia Richards. Henry Mietkiewicz of the Toronto Star said that Annie "crowed gracelessly" during her scenes and opined that Buxton had a tendency to "shrilly overplay" Annie.

After the demise of Sunset Beach, Buxton joined the cast of the CBS soap opera The Bold and the Beautiful. She was regular from 2000 to 2001 as the less-than-sane villainess Morgan DeWitt, and in 2005, she returned to that role. In addition, she played a minor character, porn star Crystal Chablis, on the soap opera Days of Our Lives in 2004. After returning to The Bold and the Beautiful in March 2005 and signing a year-long contract, Buxton's run ended abruptly after just one month. In 2005, Buxton was considered for the coveted role of Carly Corinthos on General Hospital.

Buxton has appeared in the critically acclaimed films The Climb (1999) starring alongside John Hurt, and Little Children (2006). She also starred alongside Steven Seagal in the 2005 action film Today You Die, and has appeared in films Devil's Highway, Bedtime Stories, and Spread. On television, she has guest starred on CSI: Crime Scene Investigation, NYPD Blue, Criminal Minds and Glee.

Buxton's company TUTUblue markets UV-protective swimwear, which she pitched during the 7th season, episode 18 of Shark Tank.

== Personal life ==
Buxton was born in California. She lives in Beverly Hills with her husband, Irish actor Shane Brolly. The couple married on November 27, 2006.

== Filmography ==
=== Film ===
| Year | Title | Role | Notes |
|---|---|---|---|
| 1984 | Sam's Son | Cheerleader | |
| 1984 | Lovelines | Cathy | |
| 1985 | The Sure Thing | Sharon | |
| 1987 | Less than Zero | Markie | |
| 1988 | Primal Rage | Debbie | |
| 1989 | Nightmare Beach | Gail Jackson | |
| 1990 | Instant Karma | Kathy | |
| 1991 | Rock 'n' Roll High School Forever | Rita Mae | |
| 1991 | Don't Tell Mom the Babysitter's Dead | Tess | |
| 1991 | Seeds of Tragedy | Amy | Television film |
| 1991 | Checkered Flag | Concierge | |
| 1991 | Pink Lightning | Tookie | Television film |
| 1994 | Fast Getaway II | Patrice | Direct-to-video |
| 1994 | Cityscrapes: Los Angeles | Actress / Waitress | |
| 1996 | Listen | Krista Barron | |
| 1999 | The Climb | Ruth Langer | |
| 1999 | Dirty Down Under... Up Here | Unknown | |
| 2002 | Drama Queen | Angie | Short film |
| 2004 | Sin's Kitchen | Lou | |
| 2005 | McBride: It's Murder, Madam | Heather Bronson | Television film |
| 2005 | Today You Die | Agent Rachel Knowles | Direct-to-video |
| 2005 | Devil's Highway | Woman | |
| 2006 | Little Children | Slutty Kay | |
| 2008 | Japan | Red's Muse | |
| 2008 | Bedtime Stories | Hokey Pokey Woman | |
| 2009 | Spread | Helen | |
| 2016 | In Embryo | Cocktail Waitress | Uncredited cameo |
| 2024 | Feeling Randy | Mark's mom | |
| 2024 | The Fall | Miranda Huxley | |
| TBA | Happywood | Missy | Television film |

=== Television ===
| Year | Title | Role | Notes |
|---|---|---|---|
| 1983 | Simon & Simon | Diane | Episode "Bon Voyage, Alonso" |
| 1985 | Otherworld | Zeta | Episode "Rock and Roll Suicide" |
| 1986 | Mr. Belvedere | Bonnie | Episode "The Spelling Bee" |
| 1986 | Easy Street | Cornelia | Episode "Demon Child '86" |
| 1987 | 21 Jump Street | Trina | Episode "16 Blown to 35" |
| 1987–1988 | Rags to Riches | Amy Hillerman | Recurring role, 4 episodes |
| 1988 | Who's the Boss? | Cory | Episode "Nineteen Again" |
| 1989 | Freddy's Nightmares | Roni Peterson | Episode "Do Dreams Bleed?" |
| 1990 | Disneyland | Karen | Episode "Exile" |
| 1990 | Monsters | Megan | Episode "Perchance to Dream" |
| 1990 | The Fresh Prince of Bel-Air | Kimmy | Episode "Knowledge Is Power" |
| 1990 | China Beach | Dottie | Episode "One Small Step" |
| 1992 | The Young Riders | Celinda | Episode "Song of Isaiah" |
| 1995 | Silk Stalkings | Lauren Hamilton | Episode "Champagne on Ice" |
| 1995 | Platypus Man | Leslie | Episode "Sweet Denial" |
| 1995 | Diagnosis Murder | Spring Tatum | Episode "Sea No Evil" |
| 1995 | Renegade | Dominique | Episode "Studs" |
| 1996 | Walker, Texas Ranger | Jane / Tracy O'Neill | Episode "Flashpoint" |
| 1997 | Baywatch | Molly McCoy | Episode "Bachelor of the Month" |
| 1997–1999 | Sunset Beach | Annie Douglas Richards | Series regular Nominated — Soap Opera Digest Award for Outstanding Villaines – Daytime (1998) |
| 2000–2001, 2005 | The Bold and the Beautiful | Morgan DeWitt | Series regular Nominated — Soap Opera Digest Award for Outstanding Villaines – Daytime (2001) |
| 2003 | NYPD Blue | Carlotta | Episode "Porn Free" |
| 2004 | Days of Our Lives | Crystal Galore | Recurring role, 22 episodes |
| 2004 | CSI: Crime Scene Investigation | Wendy Garner / Lana Davis | Episodes "Eleven Angry Jurors" and "Ch-Ch-Changes" |
| 2009 | CSI: Miami | Carolyn Morrow | Episode "Flight Risk" |
| 2010 | Criminal Minds | Leslie Sanders | Episode "Compromising Positions" |
| 2012 | Glee | Mrs. Cross | Episode "Glee, Actually" |
| 2015 | Hand of God | Erika | Episode "He So Loved" |
| 2016 | Shark Tank | Herself | Episode "7.18 Sworkit, Clean Sleep, Tutublue, Nohbo, Signalvault" |
| TBA | Olga Dies Dreaming | Mrs. Davis | Episode #1.1 |
