= Cynthia Kirchner =

American actress

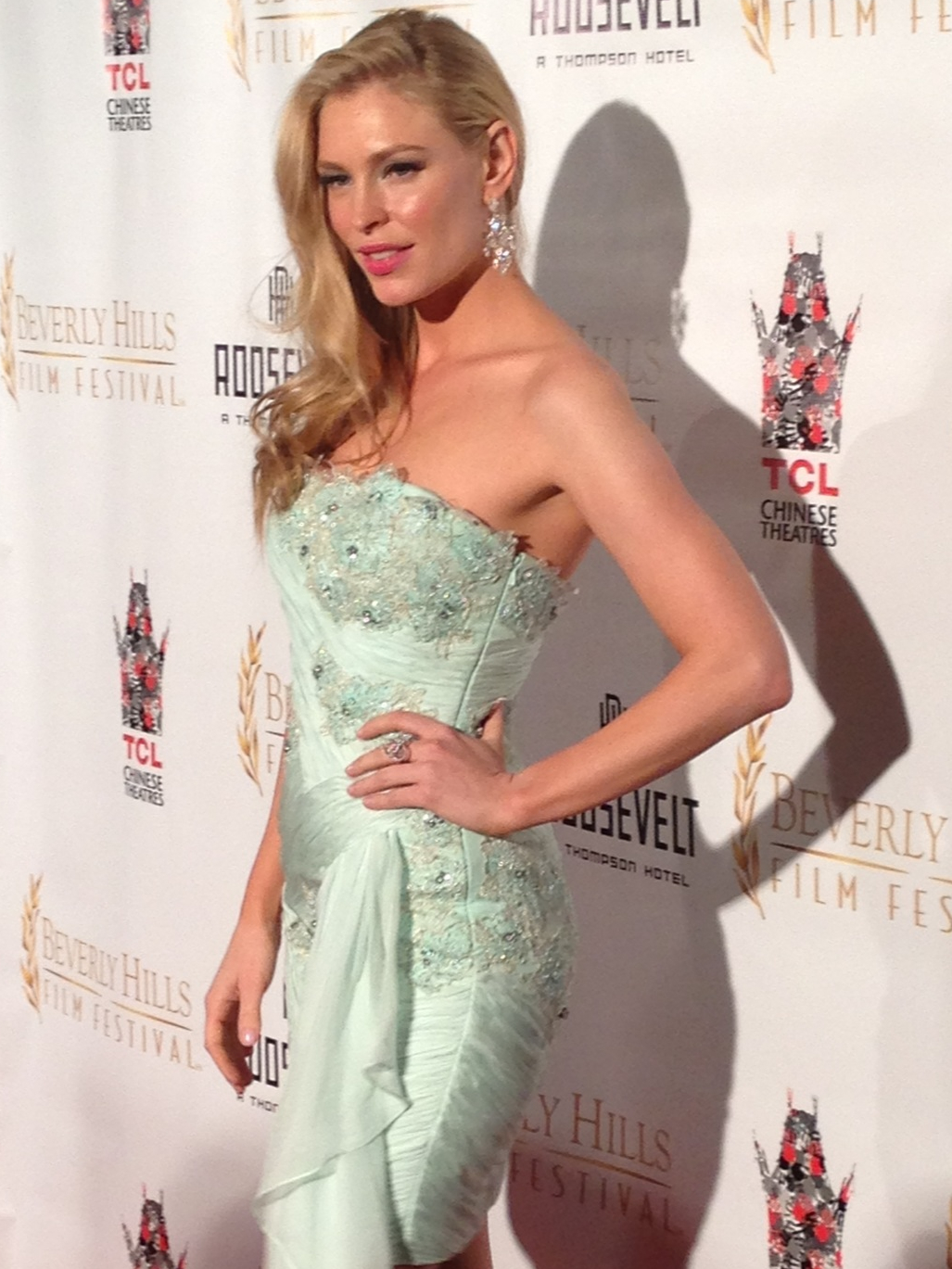
- Kirchner at the 13th Annual Beverly Hills Film Festival
- Born: April 21, 1982 (age 44)
- Occupations: Actress, model
- Years active: 2002–present
- Modeling information
- Height: 5 ft 8 in (1.73 m)
- Hair color: Blonde
- Eye color: Green/Blue

Cynthia Kirchner is an American actress and fashion model, best known for her role as Bardot in the film Hot Bot, her appearance in the Guess campaign shot by Ellen Von Unwerth, her various advertisements and commercials for L'Oreal, and her lingerie pictures for Victoria's Secret, Frederick's of Hollywood, La Senza, Warner's, Vassarette, and Christian Lacroix Kirchner's first television role was playing the recurring character Grace on The Bold and the Beautiful. She made her feature film debut as Bardot in the Polish brothers film Hot Bot, and as Kopen in Abstraction with director Daniel James Gomes.

== Early life ==
Kirchner attended Hazleton Area High School, where she graduated with honors, received an award from the Presidential Scholars Program, and earned an academic scholarship to Chestnut Hill College in Philadelphia, Pennsylvania. In 2000, moved across the country to Los Angeles, California where she stayed until 2002. In 2002, she relocated back to New York to continue pursuing her modeling career and her academic studies at New York University and Neighborhood Playhouse School of Theatre. She also graduated from the Hollywood Film Institute on September 29, 2013, where she focused on producing, writing and directing. In 2016, Kirchner completed her doctoral studies at Columbia University. In 2024, she completed the Sustainability program at Stanford University. In 2025, she received thermodynamics certification from Harvard University.

== Career ==
Kirchner has been featured in pictorials in Elle, Italian Vogue, Glamour with Terry Richardson and was featured on the cover of Cosmopolitan. She is best known for her work as a model for Guess, Intimissimi and Victoria's Secret. She has appeared in music videos for Enrique Iglesias and Justin Timberlake.

She began her modeling career in 2002 when she was discovered by Kenya Knight at Nous Model Management in Los Angeles. In her first week, Kirchner booked Guess? and worked with Bruce Weber for Abercrombie and Fitch. From there she went to Milan, Italy where she booked campaigns and appeared on FashionTV's Model Flat. While in Milan, Kirchner was scouted by Kwok Chan and signed with Marilyn Agency NY and Marilyn Agency Paris modeling agencies. In the Fall of 2002, she moved to New York.

While in New York, Kirchner was cast in a lead role of the independent film Blue Tuesday with director Chad Johansen in 2003. She then started formal acting training with Sheila Grey. She continued her acting studies at the Neighborhood Playhouse School of Theatre, where she worked with the Meisner technique under Richard Pinter and Gary King. In 2008, Kirchner appeared in another independent film, 100% Perfect Girl with director Jonathan Jacobs. Also in 2008, she appeared in the feature film, Ghosts of Girlfriends Past starring Matthew McConaughey, Michael Douglas, Jennifer Garner, and Emma Stone with director Mark Waters and was cast in the recurring role of Grace on the soap opera The Bold and the Beautiful.

In 2011, Kirchner was the lead as Kopen in Abstraction with director Daniel James Gomes and was featured alongside Jim Carrey in Mr. Popper's Penguins with director Mark Waters. She was also the lead in the Brothers Strause production of Seventh Tear and Michael Ojeda's Sex, Lies and Alibis. Kirchner started off 2012 as the lead role of "Bardot" in the Polish brothers film Hot Bot along with Larry Miller, Anthony Anderson, Angela Kinsey, Danny Masterson and Donald Faison. In June 2012, she starred in a limited engagement performance of the two-person John Patrick Shanley play Danny and the Deep Blue Sea directed by Allan Rich and worked on several Shakespeare pieces at Theatricum Botanicum.

In January 2015, Kirchner founded Supermodel University and Hollywood Academy of the Arts. In May 2015, Kirchner associate produced Things Happen with Director David S. Dawson. In June 2015, she appeared alongside Rhys Coiro inEntourage film, by director Doug Ellin. Kirchner is currently featured alongside Hugh Laurie in a L'oreal commercial and solo in a Pantene commercial. Cynthia spent the end of 2015 and beginning half of 2016 pursuing her doctoral studies and completing coursework at Columbia University in New York. Kirchner studies at the Penny Templeton Studio in New York and with Michelle Danner at the Larry Moss (acting coach) Larry Moss Studio in Los Angeles. In 2020, Cynthia produced, directed and hosted the TV series Comedy Parlour Live: Quarantine Edition, which was presented by Damon Dash. The series currently streams on Fox Soul. In 2020, Cynthia co-created Nin Nin Do with TaeBo legend Billy Blanks. In late 2021 Kirchner received her MBA from the John E. Simon School Of Business. Nin Nin Do is set to debut in mid 2026.

== Filmography ==
Film
Year	Title	Role	Awards
2009	Ghosts of Girlfriends Past	Vargas Girl Director: Mark Waters	
2011	Mr. Popper's Penguins	Pulse Lounge Girl Director: Mark Waters	
2011	Abstraction	Kopen Director: Daniel James Gomes	NYLA International Film Festival: Best Short Narrative; NYLA International Film Festival: Best Actor; Beverly Hills Film Festival: Jury Award Best Short Film; First Glance Film Festival: Best Cinematography
2011	Seventh Tear	Sloane Director: Brothers Strause	
2013	Phoenix 9	Luna Director: Amir Reichart	
2014	O-Two	Lead Director: Didier Beringuer	
2015	Entourage	Supporting Director: Doug Ellin	
2015	Things Happen	Associate Producer Director: David S. Dawson	2016 San Diego Film Awards: Best Direction; 2016 San Diego Film Awards: Best Original Score
2016	Hot Bot	Bardot Director: Michael Polish	

Television
Year	Title	Role	Notes
2011	Sex, Lies and Alibis	Corrine	
2008	The Bold and the Beautiful	Grace	
2006	Conan O'Brien	Award Presenter	
