= Bern Cohen =

American actor and educator

Bern Cohen (New York City, 1949) is an American actor and educator. He spent many years in the New York City education system before returning to acting in 2005.

== Early years ==
Cohen grew up in New York's Al Smith Projects on South Street in Chinatown, Manhattan. After attending Valley Stream South High School, he attended Adelphi University on full scholarship and started his New York professional acting career while still in college.

== Career in education ==
By age 26, Cohen decided to leave acting in favor of a more involved role in parenting his two children. He went into education and was a fourth-grade teacher before teaching secondary Remedial Reading and becoming an administrator. He earned two graduate degrees in education administration and psychology at Columbia University and City College of New York.

Cohen led seven group trips to the Amazon rainforest and wrote three college textbooks in the fields of bilingual education, school evaluation, and race relations. He was President of BCR&D, a large private research and development group that specialized in assessing public education programs.

In New York City, he was a District Director of Instruction in two school districts and eventually served in that capacity for the entire New York City school system. He was assigned to take over and lead several low-achieving New York schools and became known for his ability to turn failing schools into successful schools with demanding academic models and supportive behavior remediation.

== Acting career ==
Cohen took early retirement from his academic career to return to acting studies with Penny Templeton and Ruth Nerkin, and rejoined the New York acting corps. He is a member of the Screen Actors Guild, Equity, and AFTRA.

He created the role of Morris Bober in the first stage adaptation of Bernard Malamud's The Assistant at New York's Turtle Shell Theater. He appeared in several other off-Broadway shows and 15 films since retiring as a high school principal in 2005.

Cohen played Rebbe Horowitz in the 2010 Sundance Festival selection, Holy Rollers. His other principal film roles include Tickling Leo with Eli Wallach, 27 Dresses with Katherine Heigl, Fallen Star (formerly Goyband) with Tovah Feldshuh, and Brooklyn Rules with Alec Baldwin.

== Filmography ==
- 2018: To Dust as Reb Goshen
- 2016: Shooting Clerks as Thomas Burke
- 2016: Brooklyn Tide as Mr. Blake
- 2015: Mad Full of Dreams as Lowenstein
- 2014: Frank vs. God as Rabbi Grossman
- 2012: Doctor Bello as Dr. Bernstein
- 2011: Identical as Rabbi Resnikoff
- 2011: Project Nim as Dr. Lemmon
- 2010: Holy Rollers as Rebbe Horowitz
- 2009: Tickling Leo as Yosef Gottleib
- 2006: The Minority as Dr. Berger
