= Clifford (film) =

1994 film directed by Paul Flaherty

- Theatrical release poster
- Directed by: Paul Flaherty
- Written by: Jay Dee Rock (alias of Will Porter) "Bobby Von Hayes" (alias of Steven Kampmann)
- Produced by: Larry Brezner; Pieter Jan Brugge
- Starring: Martin Short; Charles Grodin; Mary Steenburgen; Dabney Coleman
- Cinematography: John A. Alonzo
- Edited by: Tim Board; Pembroke J. Herring
- Music by: Richard Gibbs
- Production companies: Morra, Brezner, Steinberg and Tenenbaum Entertainment
- Distributed by: Orion Pictures
- Release date: April 1, 1994
- Running time: 90 minutes
- Country: United States
- Language: English
- Budget: $19 million
- Box office: $7.4 million

Clifford is a 1994 American slapstick black comedy film directed by Paul Flaherty, written by Will Porter (under the alias of "Jay Dee Rock") and Steven Kampmann (under the alias of "Bobby Von Hayes"), and starring Martin Short, Charles Grodin, Mary Steenburgen, and Dabney Coleman with supporting roles by G.D. Spradlin, Anne Jeffreys, Richard Kind, and Jennifer Savidge. It tells the story of a 10-year-old boy who stays with his uncle while his parents are on a business trip in Honolulu.

Clifford was filmed in 1990 and originally planned for release in the summer of 1991, but was shelved for several years due to Orion Pictures' bleak financial situation. The film was not released until 1994, and was a critical and commercial failure but has since developed a cult following.

== Plot ==
At a Catholic school in 2050, elderly priest Father Clifford Daniels catches a boy named Roger attempting to run away after blowing up the gym because he was not allowed on a basketball team, as his parents forbid Roger from partaking in any contact sports. To dissuade Roger from running away, Clifford tells the boy a story of his own youth, stating that "when people like you and I get frustrated, it can cause a lot of damage".

As a 10-year-old in the 1990s, Clifford is a troublemaker who never lets go of his toy Brachiosaurus named Steffen and is obssessed with visiting Dinosaur World, a theme park in Los Angeles. While flying with his parents to Honolulu on his father Julian's business trip, Clifford intentionally causes the pilot to make an emergency landing in Los Angeles and is subsequently banned from the flight.

To be able to resume the trip, on a suggestion by Clifford himself, Julian phones his brother Martin to have Clifford temporarily stay with him. Martin accepts, thinking this as the perfect opportunity to prove to his fiancée Sarah Davis how well he interacts with children, unaware of Clifford's antics. Upon their reunion, Martin reveals to Clifford that he designed Larry the Scary Rex, a Dinosaur World attraction, and thus can get into the park free of charge. Martin promises to take him there, but has to break it the next day when his boss Gerald Ellis orders Martin to redesign his plans for the city's public transit system in two days. At a gas station, Clifford attempts to sneak away by posing as someone else's son in a dinosaur costume, but Martin catches him. As a punishment, Martin tells Clifford the Dinosaur World trip is canceled.

Enraged, Clifford humiliates Martin during Sarah's parents' wedding anniversary with several pranks, culminating in Martin's arrest after Clifford calls in a fake bomb threat to city hall, made from mixing audio of Martin's previous scolding with an answering machine. Released on bail, Martin scolds him again, insisting that he write a confession to the police. Clifford later tricks Martin into catching a train to San Francisco, where Sarah has traveled on the request of Ellis attempting to seduce her. Back at Martin's home, Clifford throws a party for strangers in exchange for a trip to Dinosaur World. When Martin returns home, he boards an already (self) tied-up Clifford up in his room; Sarah later frees him and takes him with her. As Martin arrives late to Ellis's presentation of the new transit system, the city model, rigged by Clifford, explodes, costing Martin his job.

A now psychotic Martin kidnaps Clifford and takes him to Dinosaur World after closing hours, and makes him ride Larry the Scary Rex. After going through it once, Clifford seems to enjoy himself, so Martin increases the ride's speed repeatedly. When set to hyper speed, the ride malfunctions and Clifford's cart crashes, leaving him dangling above the jaws of a robotic dinosaur. Martin rants about what Clifford's antics have cost him, but he eventually risks his life and rescues him. Clifford apologizes, but Martin will not hear it, and calls him a force of destruction that eventually everyone gets to hate.

Father Clifford tells Roger how he was devastated to hear those words, and how it forced him to see the error of his ways ("If you destroy everyone who stands in the way of your dreams, then you'll end up alone with no dreams left"). He had sent 287 apology letters to Martin, which were returned unopened. When Roger asks about what happened to Sarah, Clifford reveals that she and Martin were married, and he was invited as the ring bearer. Through a gesture from Sarah, Martin finally forgives Clifford and gives him a kiss on the head.

Moved by the tale, Roger decides to write 287 letters asking for forgiveness. Father Clifford takes Steffen out of his pocket, saying "Mission accomplished, old friend."

== Cast ==
- Martin Short as Clifford Daniels, a mischievous 10-year-old boy who later becomes a priest in 2050.
- Charles Grodin as Martin Daniels, an architect and Clifford's uncle who watches Clifford while his parents are in Honolulu.
- Mary Steenburgen as Sarah Davis Daniels, a daycare center worker and Martin's co-worker/fiancée who later becomes Clifford's aunt.
- Dabney Coleman as Gerald Ellis, Martin and Sarah's boss who wears a toupee.
- G.D. Spradlin as Parker Davis, the father of Sarah who would later become Clifford's great-uncle.
- Anne Jeffreys as Annabelle Davis, the mother of Sarah who would later become Clifford's great-aunt.
- Richard Kind as Dr. Julian Daniels, Clifford's short-tempered and workaholic father who is estranged from his brother Martin.
- Jennifer Savidge as Theodora Daniels, Clifford's loving but workaholic mother.
- Ben Savage as Roger, a boy from 2050 who Father Clifford recounts his childhood to.
- Don Galloway as Captain
- Tim Lane as Navigator
- Josh Seal and Kevin Mockrin as Kevin
- Timothy Stack as Kevin's father
- Marianne Muellerleile as Kevin's mother
- Richard Fancy and Al Pugilese as the detectives who arrested Martin
- Seth Binzer as Victor
- Barry Dennen as the voice of Terry the Pterodactyl, an animatronic Pterodactyl on the Larry the Scary Rex ride.

== Production ==
Co-writer Steven Kampmann had the idea of doing a comedy version of The Bad Seed (1956). The film was greenlit by Orion Pictures, but producer Larry Brezner was concerned that there was another comedy about an evil child coming out, Problem Child, and put a halt to production. To distinguish Clifford, Kampmann suggested the child lead be played by Martin Short, who was a fan of The Bad Seed. Kampmann and Short filmed screen tests with Short as Clifford, and Orion liked the footage. Kampmann was hired as director, but disagreements emerged between him and other members of the creative team, and Orion brought in Paul Flaherty (from Short's old series SCTV days) to replace him.

Grodin claimed that he and Short improvised during the making of the movie.

In August 1990, it was reported that filming would be taking place in Los Angeles.

Filming on Clifford took place from September through November of 1990.

In order to create the illusion of Martin Short portraying a child various techniques were utilized. With the actors working around Short, some such as Mary Steenburgen wore high-heeled shoes while others such as Charles Grodin were cast because they were above average in height in relation short. For shots of Clifford from the back, a five-foot-even body double was utilized. Prop work was also used to convey the illusion with pictures and wall decor raised when Short was next to them or lowering chairs or enlarging a bed when necessary. For the scene in which Clifford appeared seated on an airplane with his parents, Short's seat cushion was removed.

Clifford's release was delayed by the bankruptcy of Orion Pictures. The film was not released until April 1994, a year in which the highest-grossing comedies were The Mask and Dumb and Dumber, and enthusiasm for marketing it was low.

== Release ==
The film was theatrically released on April 1, 1994. The film would not receive a home video release for ten years until March 2, 2004.

== Reception and legacy ==
It's not bad in any usual way. It's bad in a new way all its own. There is something extraterrestrial about it, as if it's based on the sense of humor of an alien race with a completely different relationship to the physical universe.

— Roger Ebert, Chicago Sun-Times

On the review aggregator website Rotten Tomatoes, 20% of 35 critics' reviews are positive. The website's consensus reads: "Ill-conceived and desperately unfunny, Clifford stars Martin Short as a 10-year-old boy. You read that correctly. That's the joke." Audiences polled by CinemaScore gave the film an average grade of "B−" on an A+ to F scale.

Roger Ebert gave the film a half-star of a possible four. He wrote: "The movie is so odd, it's almost worth seeing just because we'll never see anything like it again. I hope."

He and his colleague Gene Siskel gave Clifford "Two thumbs down" on their television show At the Movies, with particular criticism towards Martin Short's casting; Siskel likened him to "a wizened little dwarf".

Desson Thomson for The Washington Post praised Grodin but said everything else was "an awful piece of business"; Variety called it "gimmicky" and "poorly conceived".

Clifford has since gained a reputation as a cult film to the point of being reappraised by pop culture writer Nathan Rabin and Entertainment Weekly senior editor Josh Wolk. Martin Short later said, "I remember going to a critics' screening, sitting at the back, and the place was raucous. And yet the reviews did not reflect that. ... I think when a film is obscure enough, you feel it's now yours. Your parents don't know this film, but you do." Short has said he gets more recognition from people for Clifford than any other film he's done and described it as "most bizarrely original movies I’ve ever made".

=== Year-end lists ===
- 6th worst – Sean P. Means, The Salt Lake Tribune
- Top 10 worst (not ranked) – Betsy Pickle, Knoxville News-Sentinel
- Top 12 worst (Alphabetically ordered, not ranked) – David Elliott, The San Diego Union-Tribune
- Dishonorable mention – Glenn Lovell, San Jose Mercury News
- Worst (not ranked) – Bob Ross, The Tampa Tribune
- #2 Worst - Jeffrey Lyons, Sneak Previews
