= The Merry Gentlemen =

2024 film by Peter Sullivan

- Release poster
- Directed by: Peter Sullivan
- Screenplay by: Marla Sokoloff
- Story by: Jeffrey Schenck; Peter Sullivan
- Produced by: Jeffrey Schenck; Barry Barnholt; Brian Nolan; Peter Sullivan
- Starring: Britt Robertson; Chad Michael Murray
- Cinematography: Lars Lindstrom
- Edited by: Randy Carter
- Music by: Brooke deRosa
- Production companies: Hybrid; Gentleman Media Group
- Distributed by: Netflix
- Release date: November 20, 2024
- Running time: 87 minutes
- Country: United States
- Language: English

The Merry Gentlemen is a 2024 American Christmas romantic comedy film directed by Peter Sullivan, and starring Britt Robertson and Chad Michael Murray.

The film follows a Broadway dancer who stages an all-male, Christmas-themed revue in hopes of saving her parents' small-town performing venue.

It was released on Netflix on November 20, 2024.

== Plot ==
Broadway dancer Ashley Davis has rarely been back to her hometown in the 12 years since landing a part in the Christmas-themed show Jingle Belles. After a misstep onstage, Jodie the choreographer tells her she has been replaced by a younger dancer to keep it fresh.

Ashley's mom Lily calls to say she and her dad Stan are coming to see her show on Christmas Eve; Ashley tells them she is coming home for Christmas to her parents' venue The Rhythm Room in Sycamore Creek instead. Upon arriving, she literally runs into Luke, the resident carpenter-handyman. Her parents' landlady Denise reminds them about their $30,000 overdue rent debt.

Ashley next visits the Little Spoon Cafe, run by her elder sister Marie and her husband Rodger. When Luke comes in for his lunch order, Marie has him give Ashley a lift back. Later on at her parents' bar, Ashley sees Luke shirtless, as his shirt got wet while he was fixing the plumbing.

Denise announces that a juice bar is interested in taking over Ashley's parents' venue. Thinking about Marie's former boyfriend who was secretly a stripper, and about Luke's physique, Ashley starts planning "The Merry Gentlemen". It is an all-male, Christmas-themed revue, in hopes of saving her parents' venue. Luke initially refuses, but agrees upon hearing they have under a month to pay off The Rhythm Room's debt. Ashley also recruits Rodger and bartender Troy, and she is to be choreographer.

After their successful first show with a construction worker motif, Luke walks Ashley home. He had originally come to Sycamore Creek with his new wife, but stayed after the marriage ended. Luke gives Ashley a wreath necklace to remember how they met and they get a photo taken with Santa.

Ashley recruits taxi driver Ricky, after seeing his impromptu dancing. The group's next dance routine is as cowboys, and by the fourth show the shows are selling out. When Rodger twists an ankle, retired bar patron Danny steps in.

Troy tells Ashley that Luke is the happiest he has seen him in ages. Marie asks Ashley to deliver Luke's lunch to his carpentry workshop, where they dance and end up kissing. At the office they see they have almost reached their goal. Jodie calls Ashley, begging her to return to NYC as her replacement was not a success, offering her a raise and a decent contract.

Ashley's parents tell her to do what she feels is best for her. Luke is upset that she tells the dancers as a group, not giving him a heads up first, and confesses he was starting to fall in love with her. On the 24th he overhears her telling Marie she has feelings for him too, just before she leaves in a taxi for the airport.

On the way out of town, in heavy traffic, a song on the radio reminds Ashley of Luke, so she returns. Entering the show just as Luke forgets his dance steps, he sees her, then finishes the routine successfully. At their extended family Christmas dinner, Ashley hands over the full $30,000 to Denise.

== Cast ==
- Britt Robertson as Ashley
- Chad Michael Murray as Luke
- Marla Sokoloff as Marie
- Michael Gross as Stan
- Beth Broderick as Lily
- Maxwell Caulfield as Danny
- Maria Canals-Barrera as Denise
- Meredith Thomas as Jodie
- Colt Prattes as Troy
- Hector David Jr. as Ricky
- Marc Anthony Samuel as Rodger

== Production ==
The film is written by Marla Sokoloff and directed by Peter Sullivan. The cast is led by Britt Robertson and Chad Michael Murray, and also includes Sokoloff, Beth Broderick, Michael Gross and Maxwell Caulfield.

== Release ==
The film was released on Netflix on November 20, 2024.

== Reception ==
On the review aggregator website Rotten Tomatoes, 44% of 12 critics' reviews are positive, with an average rating of 4.3/10. Metacritic, which uses a weighted average, assigned the film a score of 34 out of 100, based on 6 critics, indicating "generally unfavorable" reviews.
