= Trading Hearts =

- Directed by: Neil Leifer
- Written by: Frank Deford
- Produced by: Josi W. Konski
- Starring: Raul Julia; Beverly D'Angelo
- Cinematography: Karen Grossman
- Edited by: Rick Shaine
- Music by: Stanley Myers
- Production company: Vista Organization
- Distributed by: Vista Organization
- Release date: May 27, 1988 (limited)
- Running time: 88 minutes
- Country: United States
- Language: English

Trading Hearts is a 1988 American comedy film directed by Neil Leifer and starring Raul Julia and Beverly D'Angelo.

== Plot ==
Set in the 1950s in Florida, a popular young baseball pitcher (Raul Julia) is forced to retire. He finds solace in a divorced nightclub singer. Her precocious daughter thinks the pair belong together.

== Cast ==
- Raul Julia as Vinnie Iacona
- Beverly D'Angelo as Donna Nottingham
- Jenny Lewis as Yvonne Rhonda Nottingham
- Parris Buckner as Robert Nottingham

== Reception ==
Leonard Maltin gave the film one and a half stars.
