= The Minority =

2006 film

- Directed by: Dwayne Buckle
- Written by: Dwayne Buckle
- Produced by: Dwayne Buckle; Josh Norton
- Starring: Billoah Greene
- Cinematography: Stephen Koh
- Edited by: Dwayne Buckle; Josh Norton
- Music by: 3SIXDY
- Production companies: 360 Sound and Vision
- Distributed by: Celebrity Video Distribution
- Release date: 2007
- Running time: 84 minutes
- Country: United States
- Language: English

The Minority is a 2007 American film written and directed by Dwayne Buckle and starring Billoah Greene as Jake Jackson. The Minority was Dwayne Buckle's first feature-length film which was shot in New York City. The movie had its theatrical motion picture release in 2007 and debuted at the 15th Annual Pan African Film Festival in Los Angeles, where it won an Honorable Mention Award. The film had its DVD release in 2009.

== Plot ==
Jake Jackson is a happy, positive young black professional who has a good job and a relationship. As Jake goes about his daily routine, he sees multiple incidents of racism around him which are perplexing to him because he never had experienced them himself. But all this changes one day, when one of his white co-workers asks if he would be interested in a date. When Jake turns her down, she becomes upset. She concocts an incident at work which gets Jake fired from his job. This incident begins Jake's experience with racial bias. During Jake's job search, he continues to be bombarded with racial incidents from the police, security guards, job interviewers, and store owners. By the end of the film Jake is a changed man, frustrated, angry, and exhausted from all the racial bias he has experienced. However, Jake's luck changes when he encounters a wanted serial killer.

== Cast ==
- Billoah Greene
- Bern Cohen
- Carson Grant

== Awards ==
- Honorable Mention By The Jury Award. 3rd Annual STEPS International Rights Film Festival, December 2009, Kharkiv, Ukraine.
- Best Feature Film Award October, 18th 2008, 7th Annual Urban Mediamakers Film Festival Atlanta, Georgia.
- Honorable Mention Award. 15th Annual Pan African Film Festival (PAFF), February, 2007, Los Angeles
