= Jennifer Savidge =

American actress

- Occupation: Actress
- Years active: 1977–present
- Spouse: Robert Fuller (m. 2001)

Jennifer Savidge is an American actress, best known for her role as Nurse Lucy Papandrao in the NBC medical drama series, St. Elsewhere. She is married to actor Robert Fuller.

== Career ==
Savidge has appeared in a number of television shows. From 1982 to 1988, she was regular cast member in the NBC medical drama series, St. Elsewhere. She played the role of Nurse Lucy Papandrao. During 1990s, Savidge has appeared in several made for television movies, and guest starred on L.A. Law, Lois & Clark: The New Adventures of Superman, Sisters, Star Trek: Deep Space Nine and Beverly Hills, 90210. Her film credits include Clifford (1994), Magic Kid 2 (1994), True Crime (1996), Evolution (2001), Searching for Sonny (2011), and Rudderless (2014).

From 2000 to 2005, Savidge had the recurring role as Commander Amy Helfman in the CBS procedural, JAG. In 2015, she played Ruth Taylor in the first season of ABC's critically acclaimed drama series, American Crime.

Savidge studied acting under Milton Katselas. Her work on Broadway included portraying Hilda in The Night of the Iguana (1976) and Lady of Verona in Romeo and Juliet (1977). She also appeared in several regional theater productions. Between plays she found other employment, including managing a restaurant and managing an art gallery.

== Personal life ==
Savidge married actor Robert Fuller in Los Angeles on May 19, 2001. They began living on a ranch near Dallas, Texas, in 2004.

== Filmography ==
=== Film ===
Year	Title	Role	Notes
1988	Going to the Chapel	Tina Roberti	
1994	Magic Kid 2	Suzanne	
1994	Clifford	Theodora Daniels	
1995	True Crime	Celia Giordano	
2001	Evolution	Claire	
2011	Searching for Sonny	Mrs. Noble	
2014	Rudderless	Brent's Wife	

=== Television ===
Year	Title	Role	Notes
1977	James at 16	Linda	Episode: "Kathy's in the Shower"
1982–1988	St. Elsewhere	Nurse Lucy Papandrao	63 episodes
1983	Scarecrow and Mrs. King	Candy	Episode: "The ACM Kid"
1984	Knots Landing	Sharon Astor	Episode: "Second Chances"
1984	Mr. Success	Lara	Television film
1985	Anything for Love	Helen Worth	Television film
1988	The Secret Life of Kathy McCormick	Marsha	Television film
1988	Shootdown	Mary	Television film
1989	For Jenny with Love	Annie	Television film
1989	Life Goes On	Ellie Cooper	Episode: "Ordinary Heroes"
1990	Dark Avenger	Dr. Tanya Russell	Television film
1992	Silk Stalkings	Christine Randall	Episode: "Intensive Car"
1992	L.A. Law	Meredith Tudor	Episode: "Diet, Diet My Darling"
1992–1996	Sisters	Marissa Stone / Jenni Sorenson	3 episodes
1993	Civil Wars	Leslie Forman	Episode: "Split Ends"
1994	Lois & Clark: The New Adventures of Superman	Lena Harrison	Episode: "The Ides of Metropolis"
1995	If Someone Had Known	Dr. Lois Coutu	Television film
1996	Pandora's Clock	Barb Rollins	2 episodes
1997	Star Trek: Deep Space Nine	Fala	Episode: "The Darkness and the Light"
1997	High Tide	Ellen Kendall	Episode: "Open House"
1997	Lost on Earth	Arlene	Episode #1.10
1997	Beverly Hills, 90210	Mrs. Wester	2 episodes
1998	Significant Others	Bev Chasin	3 episodes
1998	Just Shoot Me!	Binnie	Episode: "The Mask"
1999	Oh Baby	Rachel	Episode: "Sitting on Babies"
1999	Snoops	Janet Keller	Episode: "True Believers"
1999, 2000	Time of Your Life	Mrs. Sullivan	2 episodes
2000	City Guys	Mrs. Tartikoff	Episode: "Mom on the Rocks"
2000	FreakyLinks	Mrs. Park	Episode: "Subject: Three Thirteen"
2000–2005	JAG	Cmdr. Amy Helfman	21 episodes
2002	The District	Mrs. Sullivan	Episode: "The Greenhouse Effect"
2003	The Practice	Lori Healy	Episode: "Burnout"
2004	Without a Trace	Cameron Simms	Episode: "Exposure"
2005	CSI: Crime Scene Investigation	Jill Locke	Episode: "Gum Drops"
2010	Friday Night Lights	Admissions Counselor	Episode: "Toilet Bowl"
2015	American Crime	Ruth Taylor	6 episodes
