= Tickling Leo =

- Theatrical release poster
- Directed by: Jeremy Davidson
- Written by: Jeremy Davidson
- Produced by: Mary Stuart Masterson; Steven Weisman; Peter C.B. Masterson; Paul Schnee; Jeremy Davidson
- Starring: Lawrence Pressman; Daniel Sauli; Annie Parisse; Eli Wallach; Ronald Guttman; Victoria Clark
- Cinematography: Peter Masterson
- Music by: Abel Korzeniowski
- Release date: September 4, 2009 (U.S. limited)
- Running time: 91 minutes
- Country: United States
- Language: English

Tickling Leo is a 2009 independent drama film about three generations of a Jewish family whose silence about their past has kept them apart. The film was directed by Jeremy Davidson, and stars Lawrence Pressman, Daniel Sauli, Annie Parisse, Eli Wallach, Ronald Guttman and Victoria Clark.

== Plot ==
When Zak and his girlfriend Delphina visit his estranged father in the Catskills, they find him suffering from dementia and inadvertently uncover a dark family secret from World War II: an impossible sacrifice Zak's grandfather (Eli Wallach) made to join Rudolph Kasztner's controversial freedom train out of Hungary.

== Cast ==
- Lawrence Pressman as Warren Pikler
- Daniel Sauli as Zak Pikler
- Annie Parisse as Delphina Adams
- Sarah Wikenczy as Yuth Mother
- Sebastian Wikenczy Thomsen as Child
- Jonathan Valackas as Reuvan Ben Amir
- Ed Setraklan as Oscar Szoras
- Gabor Szucs as Oscar's Grandson
- Orsoja Simon as Woman in Bar
- Alexander Grech III as Bartender
- Jack as Yorrie
- Grey Rabbit Puett as Young Warren
- Ronald Guttman as Robert Pikler
- Victoria Clark as Madeline Pikler
- Lara Apponyi as Rivka Pikler
- Bern Cohen as Yosef Gottlieb

== Release ==
Tickling Leo screened at the Stony Brook Film Festival on July 25, 2009 and then opened in Manhattan, Queens and on Long Island Theaters on September 4, 2009 with a simultaneous DVD release. The film continued on to play to audiences in NorthEast, Florida and California.

=== Critical reception ===
On review aggregator website Rotten Tomatoes the film has a score of 33% based on reviews from 15 critics, with an average rating of 4.5/10.

=== Awards ===
- 2009 Jury Award for Best Feature- 2009 Stony Brook Film Festival
