= Turbulence 3: Heavy Metal =

2001 film by Jorge Montesi

- Video release poster
- Directed by: Jorge Montesi
- Written by: Wade Ferely
- Produced by: Catherine Forbes; Hugh McClelland; Ogden Gavanski
- Starring: Craig Sheffer; Gabrielle Anwar; John Mann; Monika Schnarre; Rutger Hauer; Joe Mantegna
- Production company: Trimark Pictures
- Release date: May 13, 2001 (U.S.)
- Running time: 98 minutes
- Language: English

Turbulence 3: Heavy Metal is a 2001 thriller film directed by Jorge Montesi and starring John Mann (in his first and only leading role), Monika Schnarre, Gabrielle Anwar and Joe Mantegna. The film was released direct-to-video, and is the third installment in the Turbulence trilogy, following Turbulence and Turbulence 2: Fear of Flying.

== Plot ==
Heavy metal fans and critics gather at Los Angeles International Airport to witness Slade Craven (John Mann) perform his farewell concert aboard a TransContinental Airlines Boeing 747 flying from Los Angeles to Toronto. The concert is to be broadcast online by Z-Web-TV, despite threats received by the FAA. Z-Web-TV anchor Erica Black (Monika Schnarre) and cameraman Ethan (Ben Derrick) are assigned to cover the event. After the fans and Craven's band board, the concert begins, with the passengers largely ignoring the safety demonstration.

Meanwhile, FBI agent Kate Hayden (Gabrielle Anwar) is tracking computer hacker Nick Watts (Craig Sheffer), who has accessed the live broadcast. During the concert, an unknown man corners Craven backstage, assumes his identity, and kills Craven's manager. The impostor then kills Captain Collins and takes control of the aircraft. Kate and Nick witness the events through the broadcast, while Kate contacts fellow FBI agents Frank Garner (Joe Mantegna) and Dave Barrett (Mike Dopud) to investigate. Garner and Barrett visit Z-Web-TV's offices and meet its CEO, Benny Mitchell. When Barrett contacts the FAA tower in San Diego, an explosion destroys the tower and kills everyone inside, leading the agents to suspect that Craven has accomplices on the ground.

Kate and Nick discover that the hijacker is not Craven but Simon Flanders (also played by Mann; voice by Brian Dobson). Simon had abducted the real Craven, tying him up and imprisoning him in a room in the cargo hold equipped with a computer. They also learn that Simon belongs to the Guardians of the Gateway, a demonic cult that considers itself the vanguard of the Antichrist's rule in the next millennium. Simon had previously been suspected of murder and charged with five counts of arson, but all charges were dropped for lack of evidence.

Craven communicates with Kate and Nick as Erica reveals that she is also a member of the cult. After killing Craven's guitarist, Damen, when he attempts to subdue Simon, Erica rounds up the passengers and forces them into economy class. She announces that she masterminded the hijacking and intends to crash the aircraft into Stull, Kansas. Co-pilot MacIntosh (Rutger Hauer) is ordered to carry out the crash, and the aircraft changes course.

Kate realises that the cult intends to destroy a small church in Stull, believing that the crash will release a demon. Nick finds evidence that the area is regarded as one of the world's most unholy places, including a claim that the Pope avoided flying over eastern Kansas during his 1996 visit to Colorado. Meanwhile, Craven escapes from the cargo hold and fights Simon, knocking him unconscious. He then confronts Erica backstage, disarms her and kills her by electrocuting her with an electric-chair prop. In the cockpit, Craven finds MacIntosh, who explains the plan before committing suicide. With no pilot remaining, Craven takes control of the aircraft.

As the passengers and remaining band members despair, Craven is guided by Kansas City International Airport controllers, along with Nick and Kate, towards a safe landing. Simon regains consciousness and attacks Craven in the cockpit, causing the aircraft to enter a dive. The fight continues in the main cabin, where Craven subdues Simon with a fire extinguisher and locks him in the first-class lavatory.

The aircraft reaches Missouri during a storm, and Craven safely lands at Kansas City International Airport. The passengers, crew, FBI agents, Z-Web-TV staff and airport controllers celebrate as emergency vehicles surround the aircraft. The fans, crew and band disembark, while fan Jen Shore (Michelle Harrison) recounts the incident on the news. Craven is the last to leave the aircraft and is greeted with cheers and congratulations as the film ends.

== Cast ==
- John Mann as Slade Craven / Simon Flanders
- Monika Schnarre as Erica Black
- Gabrielle Anwar as FBI Agent Kate Hayden
- Joe Mantegna as FBI Agent Frank Garner
- Rutger Hauer as Co-Pilot MacIntosh
- Sharon Alexander as Mandy Morgan
- Rick Burgess as Kyle Martin
- Bernie Coulson as "Shred"
- Brenda Crichlow as Mary Wilson
- Kendall Cross as Karen David
- Nathaniel DeVeaux as Jack Fletcher
- Mike Dopud as FBI Agent Dave Barrett
- Marrett Green as Reporter
- Michelle Harrison as Jen Shore
- Marlowe Kaufmann as Nance Goldsmith
- Andrew Kavadas as Damen
- Fred Keating as Captain Collins
- Brad Loree as "Stopnow"
- Craig Sheffer as Nick Watts
- Hrothgar Mathews as Benny Mitchell
- Alex Zahara as Ethan
- Ben Derrick as "Stopnow"
- Craig March as Allen Jennings
- David Neale as Hobbs
- Kate Robbins as Security Woman
- Ryan Robbins as Tor
- Chris Wilding as Wilson
- Alistair Abell as Stopnow (voice)
- Brian Dobson as Simon Flanders (voice)
- Zak Santiago as Gabriel Mendoza (as Zak Santiago Alam)
