= The Tollbooth =

2004 film by Debra Kirschner

- Directed by: Debra Kirschner
- Written by: Debra Kirschner
- Starring: Marla Sokoloff
- Release date: 2004
- Running time: 85 minutes
- Country: United States
- Language: English

The Tollbooth is a 2004 coming-of-age film directed by Debra Kirschner and starring Marla Sokoloff. The plot concerns a young artist struggling to forge her own identity in the big city, while her Jewish parents keep watch from just over the bridge in Brooklyn.

== Plot ==
Recently out of art school, Sarabeth (Marla Sokoloff) gets a job as a waitress and begins her struggle as a New York City artist. With her angsty and cynical personality, she doesn't have much patience for her family—a nagging mother, a father who is always misquoting Kafka, one sister who just got pregnant with her sweet but dopey husband, and another sister who is 'perfect' until she announces she's a lesbian at Rosh Hashanah dinner. Her boyfriend Simon (Rob McElhenney)'s choice to live in the suburbs with a great sound system instead of hip and unpredictable New York has given Sarabeth doubts about their future together. She uses her canvas as an escape, where she can make sense of it all. Though frustrated that she grew up being constantly reminded of relatives who were murdered in the Holocaust and how much she hates going to synagogue, she's forced to integrate Judaism into her modern life.

When she overhears a guest at a 4th of July barbecue make an anti-Semitic comment, she realizes she doesn't want to fit it in to this crowd, and that she is proud of her heritage.

== Cast ==
- Marla Sokoloff as Sarabeth Cohen
- Tovah Feldshuh as Ruthie Cohen
- Ronald Guttman as Isaac Cohen
- Idina Menzel as Raquel Cohen-Flaxman
- Rob McElhenney as Simon Stanton
- Jayce Bartok as Howie Flaxman
- Liz Stauber as Becky Cohen
- Vanessa Ferlito as Gina
