= Room 6 =

- DVD cover
- Directed by: Michael Hurst
- Written by: Mark A. Altman; Michael Hurst
- Produced by: Mark A. Altman; Mark Gottwald
- Starring: Christine Taylor; Jerry O’Connell; Shane Brolly; John Billingsley; Kane Hodder; Chloë Grace Moretz
- Cinematography: Raymond Stella
- Edited by: Kevin Greutert
- Music by: Joe Kraemer
- Production companies: IDT Entertainment; CFQ Films
- Distributed by: 20th Century Fox Home Entertainment
- Release date: June 13, 2006
- Running time: 94 minutes
- Country: United States
- Language: English
- Budget: $1 million

Room 6 is a 2006 American horror film directed by Michael Hurst and written by Hurst and Mark A. Altman. It stars Christine Taylor, Shane Brolly, Jerry O'Connell, and Ellie Cornell.

== Plot ==
Amy is an elementary school teacher who suffers from nightmares about doctors and hospitals, stemming from the circumstances of her father's death. On the afternoon of the day he proposed, Amy and her fiancé Nick are in a serious car accident. An ambulance takes Nick away without telling Amy which hospital they are going to. Amy and Lucas, the driver of the truck that hit them, try to find where Nick and Lucas' sister have been taken. Amy begins to hallucinate, seeing disfigured faces, including her own in a mirror. A little girl in her class, Melissa, claims she can help Amy find Nick, and gives Amy the name of St. Rosemary's Hospital. Amy and Lucas learn that St. Rosemary's, which was rumored to be the home of devil worshipers, was destroyed in a fire some 70 years ago, along with all the nurses and staff, who refused to leave. Meanwhile, Nick is having his own strange experiences at St. Rosemary's, such as nurses who spray blood on each other and eat another patient, and a hallway that repeats itself.

After another hallucination, Lucas comforts Amy, but is revealed as a demon, taunting her about her father's death. She escapes him, and takes a cab to the hospital, where she is attacked by the nurses and hallucinations of dead patients. She encounters her father's ghost and relives his death when she was 12 years old, where at his demand she unplugged the machine keeping him alive. The Lucas demon catches up with Amy, telling her she belongs with the ghosts and monsters at St. Rosemary's because she murdered her father. She scalds Lucas with hot steam and escapes again, eventually rescuing Nick from the operating table. The hospital spontaneously begins to burn as they escape into the light. As Amy wakes up still in the car accident, she realises her experiences have been a test, and she is about to die.

== Cast ==
- Christine Taylor as Amy Roberts
  - Marissa N. Blanchard as Young Amy Roberts
- Shane Brolly as Nick Van Dyke, Amy's boyfriend
- Jerry O'Connell as Lucas Dylan, driver of the truck that hits Amy and Nick
- Lisa Ann Walter as Sgt. Burch
- Jack Riley as Brewster, a patient in the recovery ward
- Chloë Grace Moretz as Melissa Norman, a strange little girl in Amy's class
- John Billingsley as Harrison McKendrick, another patient in the recovery ward, removed in the middle of the night
- Mary Pat Gleason as Nurse Norma Holiday, head nurse at St. Rosemary's
- Ellie Cornell as Sarah Norman, Melissa's mother
- Marshall Bell as Mr. Roberts
- James Michael McCauley as Priest / Church Demon
- Kane Hodder as Homeless Demon
- Peter MacKenzie as Dr. Kent
- Stacy Fuson as Nurse Price
- Katie Lohmann as Nurse Peterson
- Cheryl Tsai as Nurse Park
- Jill Montgomery as Nurse Montgomery
- Mark A. Altman as Doctor Altman
