= Ronald Guttman =

Belgian actor, theatrical producer, and film producer

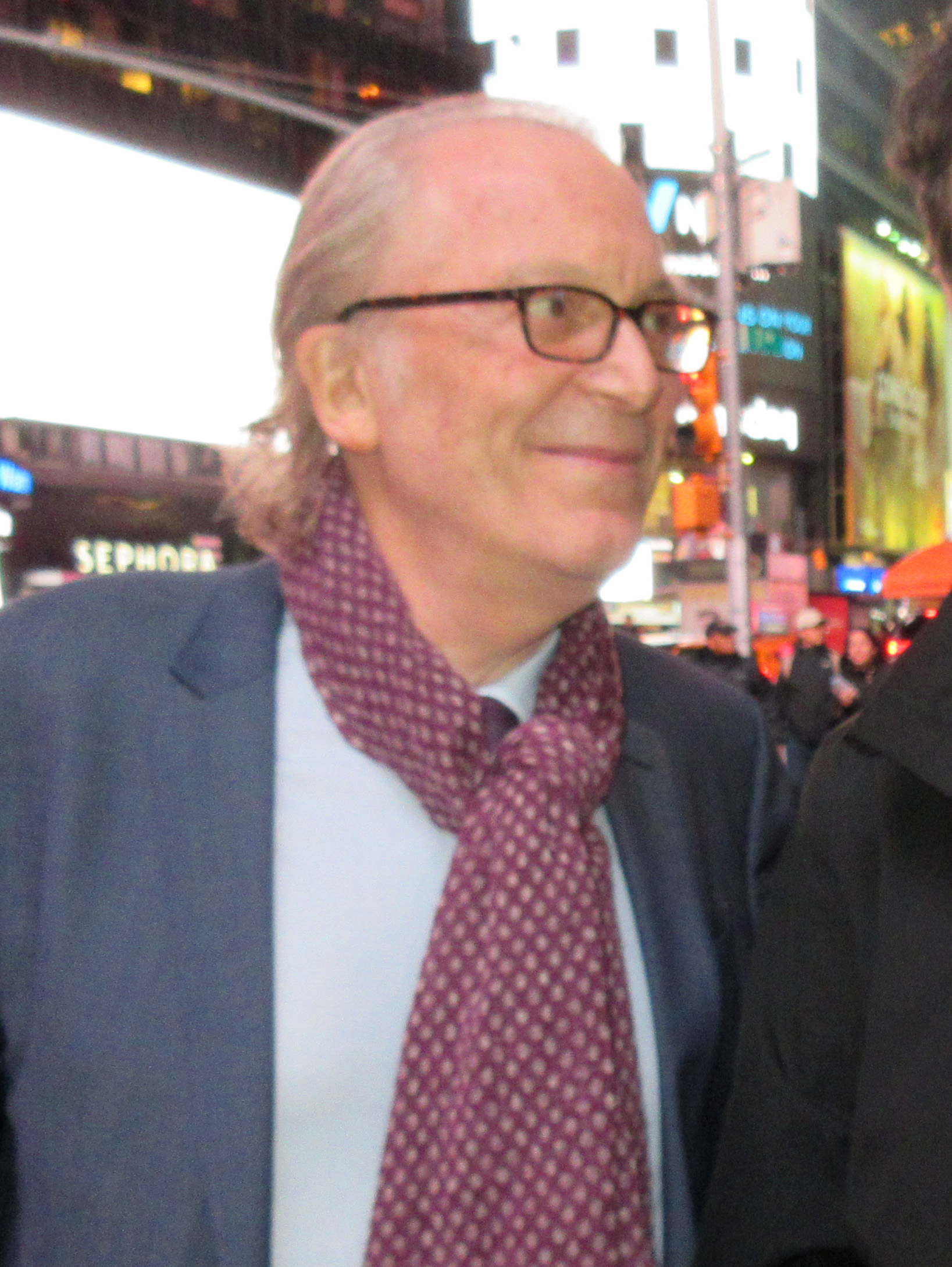
- Guttman in 2019 in New York City
- Born: 12 August 1952 (age 73); Uccle, Belgium
- Occupations: Actor, producer
- Years active: 1975–present
- Website: highbrow.net

Ronald Guttman (born 12 August 1952) is a Belgian actor, theatrical producer, and film producer.

== Career ==
Guttman was born in Uccle. He started appearing in French-language productions in Europe in 1975. He appeared in his first English-language film, Hanna K., in 1983.

He continues to work in Europe and North America, predominantly in television, including Lost, Lipstick Jungle, Heroes, The West Wing, Mad Men, and Hunters. Guttman had a recurring role as Alexander Cambias Sr. on the daytime soap opera All My Children (20 episodes over 18 years) and spots on three series in the Law & Order franchise: Law & Order, Law & Order: Criminal Intent, and Law & Order: Special Victims Unit. In 2021, he had a recurring role as French gangster Jean Jehan in the Epix drama series Godfather of Harlem.

Guttman's performances also include numerous Off-Broadway productions, including The Fifth Column, a play by Ernest Hemingway; the title role in Dennis McIntyre's Modigliani at Jewish Repertory Theatre; and the original production in 1986 of Tina Howe's Coastal Disturbances..

His movie roles include Avalon, The Hunt for Red October, On the Basis of Sex, The Tollbooth, 27 Dresses, The Guru, and August Rush.

Guttman's company, Highbrow Entertainment, has produced several feature films, including The Tollbooth, Tickling Leo, New York Street Games, and 30 Beats. Through Highbrow, he also served as a co-executive producer of Welcome to the Punch.

== Filmography ==
Year	Title	Role	Notes
1975	Le Renard à l'anneau d'or	Jean-Paul Lucassen	TV series
1979	Le Tiercé de Jack	André	TV
1982	Le Rêve d'Icare	Jeffry	TV
1983	Deux amies d'enfance		TV miniseries
1983	Danton	Herman	
1983	Hanna K.	Prison Director	
1986	Classified Love	Giancarlo	TV
1987	The Squeeze	Rigaud	
1988	Gros coeurs	Franulovic	
1988	Steal the Sky	Mohammed Khader	TV
1988	Little Nikita	Spessky	a.k.a. The Sleepers
1988	As the World Turns	Franco Visconti	TV
1989	La Danse du scorpion	Edouard de Vito	TV a.k.a. Frame Up Blues
1989	Her Alibi	'Lucy' Comanescu	
1989	Deux	Laurent	a.k.a. Two
1989	Jeniec Europy	Gen. Gougaud	a.k.a. The Hostage of Europe
1989	La Révolution française	Herman	TV (segment "Années terribles, Les") a.k.a. The French Revolution
1990	The Hunt for Red October	Lieutenant Melekhin, Engineer on Red October	
1990	Avalon	Simka	
1990	Green Card	Anton	
1991	Looping	Gianni Fabercini	
1991	Transit		
1991	L'Amérique en otage	Hossein	TV a.k.a. Iran: Days of Crisis
1992	Beverly Hills, 90210	Mr. Kluklinski	TV (Episode: "Fire and Ice")
1992	Notorious		TV
1992	Wings	Peter Swinden	TV (Episode: "As Fate Would Have It")
1992	Civil Wars	Helmut Bloch	TV (Episode: "Oboe Phobia")
1992	Le JAP, juge d'application des peines	William Cachan	TV; Episode: "Les dangers de la liberté"
1993	Navarro	Golden	TV; Episode: "L'honneur de Navarro"
1993	And the Band Played On	Dr. Jean-Claude Chermann	TV
1993	Josh and S.A.M.	Jean-Pierre LaTorette	
1994	Loin des barbares	Vincent	a.k.a. Far From the Barbarians
1994	Murder, She Wrote	Byron Tokofsky	TV; Episode: "A Murderous Muse"
1994	Les Patriotes	Employee NSA	a.k.a. The Patriots
1994	Target of Suspicion	Charles	TV
1994	M.A.N.T.I.S.	Kalashko	TV; Episode: "Cease Fire"
1995	Comfortably Numb	Rappale	
1995	Star Trek: Voyager	Gathra 'Gath' Laban	TV; Episode: "Prime Factors"
1995	V'la l'cinéma ou le roman de Charles Pathé	George Eastman	TV a.k.a. The Life of Charles Pathé
1996	The Beast	Dr. Herbert Talley	TV
1996	The Pillow Book	Calligrapher	
1996	On Seventh Avenue	Norman Ross	TV
1997	Lena's Dreams	Bob	
1997	On the Edge of Innocence	Mr. Joseph Tyler	TV
1998	Midnight Flight	Sullivan	TV
1998	Nestor Burma	Le Manessier	TV; Episode: "Mise à prix pour Nestor Burma"
1999	Suits	Barry Hoffman	
1999	Just the Ticket	Gerrard, Culinary Director	
1999	Recto/Verso	Parker	
1999	Law & Order: Special Victims Unit	Gallery Owner	TV; Episode: "Payback"
1999	Now and Again	Curator	TV; Episode: "Pulp Turkey"
2000	Woman Found Dead in Elevator	Menacing Man	
2000	The Girl	Bartender	
2000	Law & Order	Carl Reger, Assistant Italian Consul & Farber	TV; Episodes: "Everybody's Favorite Bagman" (1990, Farber), "Blood Money" (1999, Assistant Italian Consul), and "Dissonance" (2000, Carl Reger)
2001	The Believer	Danny's Father	
2001	Law & Order: Criminal Intent	Belgian Diplomat	TV; Episode: "Smothered"
2002	Papillons de nuit		
2002	Third Watch	Dominic Robert & Atty. Andrei Resnick	TV; Episodes: "Ohio" (2000, Dominic Robert), "Two Hundred and Thirty-Three Days", "The Greater Good" (2002, Atty. Andrei Resnick)
2002	The Guru	Edwin, Lexi's Dad	
2002	Benjamin Franklin	Le Comte de Vergennes	TV miniseries
2003	The Lucky Ones	Father	
2003–2009	All My Children	Alexander Cambias	TV; Unknown episodes
2004	Sex and the City	Andre DiBiachi	TV; Episode: "Splat!"
2004	Messengers	Radu, the Romanian Hypnotist	
2004	The Tollbooth	Isaac Cohen	Producer
2005	Indiscretion (101)	The Man	
2005	Starved	Charles	TV; Episodes: "Viva La Cucaracha", "Please Release Me", and "Let Me Go"
2005	Mrs. Harris	Henri	TV
2006	The West Wing	Franz – German Ambassador	TV; Episode: "Internal Displacement"
2006	Lost	Angelo	TV; Episode: "The Hunting Party"
2006	Mentor	Interviewer	
2006	Six Degrees	Charles	TV; Episode: "Pilot"
2006	Delirious	Restaurant Manager	Uncredited
2007	Lost Signs	Professeur Roger/Gaston Denis	TV miniseries
2007	Side Order of Life	Dr. Pranger	TV; Episode: "Separation Anxiety"
2007	If I Didn't Care	Ayad	a.k.a. Blue Blood
2007	August Rush	Professor	
2008	The Dueling Accountant	Shandor	
2008	27 Dresses	Antoine	
2008	Lipstick Jungle	Diego Cantero	TV "Chapter Five: Dressed to Kill" and "Chapter Six: Take the High Road"
2008	The Edge of Town	Taxi Manager	
2008	Heroes	Dr. Zimmerman	TV; Episodes: "Chapter Three: One of Us, One of Them" and "Chapter Four: I Am Become Death"
2008	The Funeral Party	Rabbi Menashe	
2009	Tickling Leo	Robert Pikler	Producer
2010	13	Joe Grubber	
2010	Blue Bloods	Claudio Calso	TV; Episode: "Privilege"
2010	New York Street Games		Documentary; Producer
2012	Mad Men	Émile Calvet	TV; Episode: "At the Codfish Ball"
2012	30 Beats		Executive Producer
2012	Je fais feu de tout bois		Co-Producer
2013	Elementary	Mr.Mueller/Elliot Honeycutt	TV; Episode: "We Are Everyone"
2013	The Good Wife	Judge Antoine Villapique	TV; Episode: "Je Ne Sais What?"
2013	Welcome to the Punch		Co-Executive Producer
2014	Welcome to New York	Roullot	
2014	Madam Secretary	Klaus Von Muhlberg	TV Episode: "Need to Know"
2015	Nina	Henri Edwards	
2015	The Rendezvous		
2015	Ricky Jay: Deceptive Practice		Documentary (American Masters); Co-Executive Producer
2017	Preacher	Denis	TV; 10 episodes
2017	Bull	Marcus Clayton	TV; Episode: "School for Scandal"
2017	Homeland	Viktor	TV; Episode: "The Return"
2018	Black Earth Rising	Jacques Antoine Barre	TV; 3 episodes
2018	On the Basis of Sex	Gerald Gunther	
2019	Long Time No See	Michel	
2020	Hunters	Moritz Ehrlich	TV; 4 episodes
2020	Sister of the Groom	Philibert	
2020	What Breaks the Ice		Executive Producer
2020–2021	Group		Web series 13 episodes Executive Producer
2021	Either Side of Midnight	Konstantin	
2021	Godfather of Harlem	Jean Jehan	TV; 4 episodes
2025	V13	Lieberman	

== Stage appearances ==
Year	Title	Role	Notes
2008	The Fifth Column	Max	
2014	Bauer	Rudolf Bauer	Production at San Francisco Playhouse
2022	Patriots		Almeida Theatre and Noël Coward Theatre
