= Shane Brolly =

Irish actor, writer, and director

- Occupations: Actor, writer, director, poet
- Years active: 1997–present
- Spouse: Sarah G. Buxton (2006–present)
- Children: 1

Shane Brolly is a Northern Irish actor, writer, and director known for his role as Kraven in the Underworld franchise.

== Life and career ==
Brolly was born in Belfast, Northern Ireland, and comes from a family of Northern Irish actors, although he has done most of his film work in the United States. After some independent films, he played a small role in the science fiction thriller Impostor, based on a story by Philip K. Dick. His most notable role to date is in Underworld as Kraven. He reprised the role for Underworld: Evolution and Underworld: Rise of the Lycans. He starred in CSI: NY in 2007 in the final episode of Season 3 "Snow Day". Besides acting, Brolly writes and directs films. His first short film, Y's Guys, was well received at the Atlanta, New York and Daytona Beach film festivals.

Brolly lives in Beverly Hills with his wife, actress Sarah G. Buxton. The couple married on 27 November 2006. On 20 December 2006, Sarah gave birth to the couple's first child, a son named Finn Michael Brolly.

=== Literary works ===
- Brolly, Shane (2003). You'd Think There Would Be More Suicides Around Here. Bleak House. ISBN 1932557016.

== Filmography ==
Film
Year	Title	Role	Other notes
2017	Lazarus	Hellborn	
2014	Book of Fire	Justinian	
2012	Y's Guys	Announcer (voice)	Writer/Director
2009	Underworld: Rise of the Lycans	Kraven	Archive audio
2009	Spread	Prince Stelio	
2008	Japan	Japan	
2006	48 Angels	The Man	
2006	Underworld: Evolution	Kraven	
2006	Room 6	Nick	
2005	Devil's Highway	Roger	
2004	Sin's Kitchen	J.D.	
2003	Underworld	Kraven	
2003	Deadly Swarm	Daniel Lang	
2003	Chromiumblue.com	Henry Brooke	
2003	Connecting Dots	Andy	
2001	Impostor	Lt. Burrows	
2001	Rennie's Landing	Brad	
1999	Flypaper	Jack	
1998	Stomping Grounds	C.D. Store Owner	

Television
Year	Title	Role	Other notes
1998	Nightman	Chrome	
2002	Spartacus	Spartacus	TV Pilot, Tribune
2004	The Secret Service	Ethan Kelly	TV Pilot, ABC
2007	CSI: NY	Colm Gunn	Episode "Snowday"
2007	Mr. and Mrs. Smith	Mr. Jones	TV Pilot, NBC
