= Shootdown (film) =

- Genre: Drama
- Written by: Judy Merl; Paul Eric Myers
- Directed by: Michael Pressman
- Starring: Angela Lansbury; George Coe; Kyle Secor; Molly Hagan; Jennifer Savidge
- Music by: Craig Safan
- Country of origin: United States
- Original languages: English; Russian

Production
- Executive producers: Leonard Hill; Robert O'Connor
- Producers: Judy Merl; Paul Eric Myers
- Cinematography: William Wages
- Editor: Daniel Cahn
- Running time: 100 minutes
- Production company: Leonard Hill Films

Original release
- Network: NBC
- Release: November 28, 1988

Shootdown is a 1988 American made-for-television drama film starring Angela Lansbury. Leonard Hill served as the executive producer.

== Plot ==
In the film, Nan Moore (Lansbury) loses her son in the Korean Air Lines Flight 007 disaster. She wishes to discover the truth about her son's death.

== Cast ==
- Angela Lansbury as Nan Moore
- George Coe as David
- Kyle Secor as John Moore
- Molly Hagan as Elizabeth Moore
- Jennifer Savidge as Mary
- Diana Bellamy as Lillian
- Alan Fudge as Bruce

== Production ==
The film's production was delayed due to controversies surrounding the KAL007 incident. NBC subjected the film to various cuts and rewrites. Producer Leonard Hill said that NBC's censors "played the role of grand inquisitor. It was quite a relentless interrogation and it turned into a war of attrition." The network deleted dialogue that criticized the U.S. government for using the incident for its own political purposes, and specific criticisms of the Reagan administration were likewise repressed. Consequently, the film made no mention of the U.S. Air Force destroying all radar tapes after the incident, nor that the Korea pilot Captain Chun took out a grand sum of insurance the night before the flight. The network also insisted that Seymour Hersh's view that the aeroplane had simply drifted into Soviet airspace be inserted into the film.

== See also ==
Coded Hostile
