= Josi W. Konski =

Cuban film producer

Josi W. Konski is a film producer. Josi is a longtime member of the Directors Guild of America, has either produced, managed or directed over 60 feature films. His experience ranges from studio pictures to independents.

== Producer credits ==
- 1980 Super Fuzz (producer)
- 1981 Freddie of the Jungle (producer)
- 1981 A Friend is a Treasure (producer)
- 1982 Banana Joe (producer)
- 1983 Cat and Dog (producer)
- 1983 Go for It (producer)
- 1984 Pulsebeat (producer)
- 1985 Trinity: Good Guys and Bad Guys (line producer, producer)
- 1987 Russkies (line producer - uncredited)
- 1988 Bersaglio sull'autostrada (producer)
- 1988 Trading Hearts (producer)
- 1988 Primal Rage (producer - as Josi Konski)
- 1989 Summer Job (line producer, producer)
- 1989 Nightmare Beach (producer)
- 1989 Cat Chaser (executive producer - as Josi Konski)
- 1990 Unlawful Passage (producer)
- 1995 Magic Island (video) (line producer)
- 1997 Big City Blues (line producer, producer)
- 1999 Friends & Lovers (producer)
- 2006 Cattle Call (producer)
- 2011 Naked in America (documentary) (producer)
- 2011 Funky Koval (producer)
- 2023 Sweetwater (producer)
