= Identical (film) =

- Film poster
- Directed by: Daniel Bollag; Seo Mutarevic
- Written by: Daniel Bollag; Yumiko Bollag
- Produced by: Daniel Bollag; Tracy Sciliano; Dale Tanguay
- Starring: Jonathan Togo; Emily Baldoni; Danny Alexander; Ed Asner; Bern Cohen
- Edited by: Ryan J. Wolfe
- Music by: Michael John Mollo
- Production companies: Land of the Free; Washington Sq. Production
- Distributed by: Amazon Instant Video
- Release date: December 1, 2011
- Running time: 90 minutes
- Country: United States
- Language: English

Identical is an American independent thriller film directed by Daniel Bollag and Seo Mutarevic and starring Jonathan Togo, Emily Baldoni, Danny Alexander, Ed Asner, and Bern Cohen. The film is inspired by true events and is based on Daniel Bollag's novel Memoirs of a Murder. The film premiered on July 23, 2011 at the Symphony Space in New York City. The film concentrates on tragic relationship between two identical twins who are intent on killing each other.

== Plot ==
Identical twins, Mark and Rich, are born, one of them is good and the other one is evil. Even though they need each other to live, each brother deeply hates the other. When they both fall in love with the same woman, the hate increases, inevitably ending in murder.

== Cast ==
- Jonathan Togo as Mark / Rich Washington
- Emily Baldoni as Shelly Worth
- Aaron Refvem as Young Mark / Rich Washington
- Meredith Zinner as Rebecca Washington
- Ed Asner as Yaakov Washington
- Kelly Baugher as Carla
- Danny Alexander as Sgt. Reese
- Bob Adrian as Officer Al
- Michael Devine as Desk Officer
- Maino as Poet #1
- Pascal Yen-Pfister as Young Yaakov Washington
- Amanda Seales as Poet #2
- Bob Johnson as Jamal
- Bern Cohen as Rabbi Resnikoff
