= Impostor (2001 film) =

2001 film directed by Gary Fleder

- Theatrical release poster
- Directed by: Gary Fleder
- Screenplay by: Caroline Case; Ehren Kruger; David Twohy
- Adaptation by: Scott Rosenberg
- Based on: "Impostor" by Philip K. Dick
- Produced by: Gary Fleder; Marty Katz; Daniel Lupi; Gary Sinise
- Starring: Gary Sinise; Madeleine Stowe; Vincent D'Onofrio; Tony Shalhoub; Tim Guinee; Mekhi Phifer
- Cinematography: Robert Elswit
- Edited by: Armen Minasian; Bob Ducsay
- Music by: Mark Isham
- Production companies: Marty Katz Productions; Mojo Films
- Distributed by: Dimension Films
- Release dates: October 27, 2001 (Japan); December 4, 2001 (California); January 4, 2002 (United States)
- Running time: 96 minutes (Theatrical Cut) 102 minutes (Director's Cut)
- Country: United States
- Language: English
- Budget: $40 million
- Box office: $8 million

Impostor is a 2001 American science fiction psychological thriller film based upon the 1953 short story "Impostor" by Philip K. Dick. The film stars Gary Sinise, Madeleine Stowe, Vincent D'Onofrio and Mekhi Phifer, and was directed by Gary Fleder. The film is set in a dystopian future in which Earth is at war with an alien civilization. Weapons designer Spencer Olham (Sinise) is accused of being a replicant created by the aliens for the purpose of assassination, and must prove his innocence while being hunted down by the military.

Impostor was conceived as one segment in an anthology film named Light Years. When the project fell through, the Impostor segment was expanded into a full, standalone film.

Impostor was released by Dimension Films in California on December 4, 2001, followed by a wide release throughout the United States on January 4, 2002. The film received negative reviews from critics and grossed $8 million on a $40 million budget, making it a box office failure.

== Plot ==
In the year 2039, Earth is attacked by an alien civilization from Alpha Centauri. Force field domes are put in place to protect cities, and a totalitarian global military government is established to effect the war and the survival of humans. The Centaurians have never been physically seen.

Thirty years later, Spencer Olham, a designer of top-secret government weapons, is arrested while on his way to work by Major Hathaway of the Earth Security Administration (ESA), being identified as a replicant created by the aliens. The ESA intercepted an alien transmission which cryptanalysts decoded as programming Olham's target to be the Chancellor, whom he was scheduled to meet. Such replicants are perfect biological copies of existing humans, complete with transplanted memories, and do not know they are replicants. Each has a powerful "U-bomb" in their chest in the exact design of a human heart, which can only be detected by dissection or a high-tech medical scan, since it only arms itself and detonates when it gets in close proximity to its target. Detection via the special scan works by comparing against a previous scan, if there was one.

Major Hathaway begins interrogating Olham. As Hathaway is about to drill out Olham's chest to find the bomb, Olham breaks loose and escapes, accidentally killing his friend Nelson in the process. With the help of underground stalker Cale, Olham avoids capture and sneaks into the hospital where his wife Maya is an administrator to get the high-tech scan redone and prove he is not a replicant. But the scan is interrupted by security forces before it can deliver the answer.

That evening, after fleeing from the city, Olham and Maya are eventually captured by Hathaway's troops in a forest near an alien crash site, close to the spot where they spent a romantic weekend just a week or so before Olham's arrest. Inside the ship they discover the corpse of the real Maya, and Hathaway shoots and kills the replicant Maya before she can detonate. Hathaway thinks he has killed the true impostor, but as his men move debris away from the Centauri ship, the real Spencer Olham's body is revealed as well. At that moment, Olham realizes aloud that both Maya and himself really are alien replicants, and the secondary trigger (his awareness of what he truly is) detonates his U-bomb, destroying himself, Hathaway, his troops, and everything else in a wide area in a fiery nuclear explosion.

A news announcement states that Hathaway and the Olhams were killed in an alien enemy attack, implying that the government covered up or are unaware of the truth. Cale wonders if he ever really knew Olham's true identity.

== Cast ==
- Gary Sinise as Spencer Olham
- Madeleine Stowe as Maya Olham
- Vincent D'Onofrio as Major D.H. Hathaway
- Mekhi Phifer as Cale
- Tony Shalhoub as Nelson Gittes
- Tim Guinee as Dr. Carone
- Gary Dourdan as Captain Burke
- Lindsay Crouse as Chancellor
- Clarence Williams III as Secretary of Defense (uncredited cameo role)
- Elizabeth Pena as Midwife
- Shane Brolly as Lt. Burrows
- Golden Brooks as Cale's Sister
- Ted King as RMR Operator
- Rachel Luttrell as Scan Room Nurse

== Production ==
The film adaptation was originally planned to be one segment of a three-part science fiction anthology film titled Light Years, but was the only segment filmed before the project fell apart. The other shorts were to be adaptations of Isaac Asimov's story "The Last Question" by Bryan Singer and Donald A. Wollheim's story "Mimic" by Matthew Robbins. "Mimic" had already been adapted into a film of the same name, but with a different script.

The short was originally written by Scott Rosenberg, with revisions by Mark Protosevich and Caroline Case. When it was decided to expand the short into a feature-length film, additional scenes were written by Richard Jeffries, Ehren Kruger and David Twohy.

Burn areas in Running Springs, California, were used to create the spacecraft crash site. Sets were constructed in Angeles National Forest and in numerous areas around Los Angeles. Most of the interiors were built on stage in Manhattan Beach, including a two-story hospital and three-story pharmacy, and a commuter transport station with articulated commuter "bugs". Other filming locations included the Coachella Valley.

The movie was made on an estimated $40 million budget.

== Reception ==
=== Critical response ===
Impostor received negative reviews from critics. Rotten Tomatoes gives the film a score of 25% based on 97 reviews, averaging to a score of 4.0 out of 10.0. The site's critical consensus reads: "With its low production value and uninspired direction, Impostor comes off as a mixture of The Fugitive and Blade Runner, only not as good or as involving". Metacritic gives the film a score of 33% based on 26 reviews. Audiences polled by CinemaScore gave the film an average grade of "C" on an A+ to F scale.

James Berardinelli of ReelViews gave the film two-and-a-half stars (out of four), saying that "there are a few moderately diverting subplots and the storyline eventually gets somewhere", but added that "Impostor wears out its welcome by the half-hour mark, and doesn't do anything to stir things up until the climax. You could spend the entire midsection of this movie in the bathroom and not miss much". William Arnold of the Seattle Post-Intelligencer gave the film a mildly positive review, praising lead actor Gary Sinise's ability to "hold the film together and provide a strong, sympathetic human focus. The movie's atmosphere has a very definite Blade Runner feel". Maitland McDonagh of TV Guide gave the film three stars out of four, saying that it packed "a real emotional wallop", but suggested that it would have worked better as the 40-minute short film it was originally intended to be.

Keith Phipps of The Onion's The A.V. Club gave the film a negative review, saying that "it essentially uses the setup of [the story] as a bookend to one long, dull chase scene". Robert Koehler of Variety also criticized the film, calling it "a stubbornly unexciting ride into the near future".

A. O. Scott of The New York Times offered a sardonic view of the movie's "dark view of the future" ("a badly lighted one, that is"), of the editing ("pointlessly hyperkinetic"), and of the "twist" ending ("meant to be clouded with ambiguity, but really it is unequivocally happy because it means the movie is over").

=== Box office ===
The film earned a little over $6 million at the box office in the United States and Canada, with the estimated worldwide of over $8 million, thus making it a box office failure.

== See also ==
- List of adaptations of works by Philip K. Dick
