= Love on the Side =

Movie

Love on the Side is a 2004 romance comedy film set in a small Canadian town. The film stars Marla Sokoloff, Jennifer Tilly and Monika Schnarre, was directed by Vic Sarin. It was released on DVD on March 28, 2006, after being screened at festivals in 2004.

== Plot ==
Nothing is the same in the quaint seaside town of Squamish, British Columbia, following the arrival of the glamorous, chain-smoking Linda (Monika Schnarre), who represents a developer seeking to build a casino, but is hiding two secrets. She complicates the relationship between waitress Eve (Marla Sokoloff), who had nearly worked up the nerve to ask ex-jock Jeff (Barry Watson) to an upcoming dance. Jeff and Eve's brother Chuck (Jonathan Cherry) decide to compete to see who can win Linda's affections.

== Cast ==
- Marla Sokoloff as Eve Stuckley
- Jennifer Tilly as Alma
- Monika Schnarre as Linda Avery
- Dave Thomas as "Red"
- Jonathan Cherry as Chuck Stuckley
- Marnie Alton as Verline
- Barry Watson as Jeff Sweeney
- Peter Benson as Marquee Man
- Kee Chan as Stoney
- Len Doncheff as Len
- Aaron Grain as Chip Owens
- Jesse Moss as Dwayne
- Alvin Sanders as Walt
- Frank C. Turner as Wilbur
- Matthew Safran as Radio Announcer (voice)
- Yvette Yip as Art Dealer (voice)

== Reception ==
Video Business called the film "lightweight but thoroughly enjoyable" and said, "Excellent Canadian scenery and a low-key soundtrack add considerably". Home Media Retailing called it "a charming film that hits most of the right notes" except for its epilogue which felt "tacked-on". The review went on to say, "The characters are good-hearted and easy to root for, and the story is engaging, thanks to its plainspoken earnestness."
