= Mark McClafferty =

American film producer

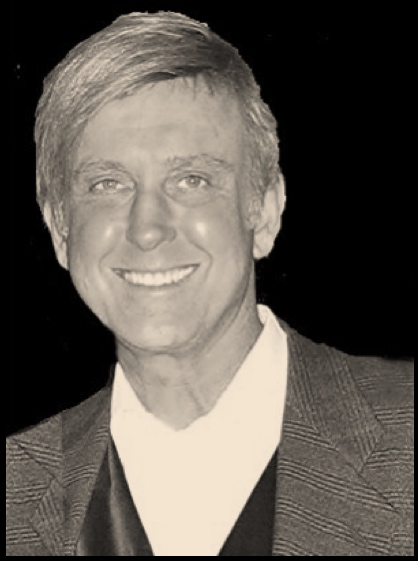
- Born: Wilmington, Delaware, United States
- Education: University of Delaware
- Occupations: Film/Television Producer, Television writer Chairman of Spellbound Pictures Ltd, an Entertainment Production, Publishing & Distribution Company

Mark McClafferty is an American film producer, television producer/writer, and Chairman of Spellbound Pictures.

== Early life ==
Mark McClafferty was born in Wilmington, Delaware. He attended the Alexis I. Du Pont School in Greenville, Delaware and then the University of Delaware where he was elected as its Student Government President in 1970. It was at the university that Mark became a speaker for student rights and an advocate against the war in Vietnam. His reputation caught the attention of the Ad Hoc Committee of Members of the House of Representatives for the Policy in South East Asia who asked him to present his views before Congress on the Vietnam War.

Mark was selected by Delaware Governor Russell W. Peterson to work for him as a Governor's intern assigned to The Family Court System in his final year at the university. After graduating from the university, Mark was hired by Gary Hart to work for Senator George McGovern early in the 1972 primary campaign. Mark continued working for McGovern, traveling to many of the primary states during his successful drive to gain the Democratic presidential nomination in Miami that year. At the convention, Mark was approached by future Senator Joseph R. Biden to return to Delaware and assist him in his first Senate Campaign as Campaign director.

== Film and Television career ==
In 1973, Mark traveled West to soon join the ABC network, first as manager and then as Director of Program Research. In three years, Mark moved into his first creative job in the motion picture and television industry at Paramount Pictures, working as Director of Creative Affairs for Miller/Milkus/Boyett Productions. During his work at Paramount, Mark developed new programs and supervised ongoing hit shows such as Happy Days, Mork & Mindy, Laverne and Shirley, Angie and Bosom Buddies, Tom Hanks first venture in Hollywood.

Moving back to ABC as a program executive, Mark was promoted to Director of Dramatic Programming for the network. Mark and his staff were responsible for supervising such shows as: Hart to Hart, Dynasty, Fantasy Island, Hotel, Hardcastle and McCormick and The Greatest American Hero. It was during this period, that Mark met producer Glen A. Larson and joined him at 20th Century Fox as the company's Executive Vice President and Producer. The company had five TV's programs on the air, including The Fall Guy, Cover Up, and Magnum, P.I. and Trauma Center.

Mark was then recruited by Eddie Murphy to return to Paramount Pictures to join Eddie Murphy Television Productions as its president. He served in this position for seven years. Under his direction the company sold eight network shows, including CBS's The Royal Family, starring Redd Foxx and Della Reese, which Mark executive produced and wrote for; What's Alan Watching?, which the television critics picked as the best Comedy Special of 1991. Mark also produced the Best of Eddie Murphy Saturday Night Live Video and the movie, The Kid Who Loved Christmas which starred Cicely Tyson, Charlie Murphy, Vanessa L. Williams, Ray Parker Jr., Ester Rolle and Sammy Davis Jr. in his last movie.

In 1996, Mark and his partner, Pamela Edwards McClafferty, formed Spellbound Pictures Ltd., USA LLC and completed a $60,000,000.00, 12-picture deal with Ellipse/Canal “+, the French Entertainment giant to supply the United Artist Theatre Circuit with a steady flow of family friendly films. Mark was named Chairman of the consortium. It was under this deal that Spellbound completed The Climb, which was released February 26, 1999.

The Climb won eight major film festival awards including Giffoni, Berlin (UNICEF AWARD), Houston and Montreal. The Climb has run on HBO, Showtime, Encore and Starz.

He was also executive producer of Katt Williams Live the successful Comedy Special/DVD Katt Williams Live now showing on Comedy Central.

Spellbound Pictures Ltd. currently has released its first novel "Blue" author Walter Jones. The musical, Artland, (Music by legendary Stanley Clarke, Book & Lyrics by Bestselling novelist, Pamela Edwards McClafferty, Produced by Mr.McClafferty) has completed a Workshop at the Caroline Leonetti Ahmanson Theatre in Los Angeles. Also on Spellbound Pictures Ltd. slate is the song, SILENT SOLDIERS, just released, sung by American Idol finalist, Rudy Cardenas, paying tribute to the Veterans of the "greatest generation to the latest generation" for the American Veterans Centers.

Mark is a member of Who's Who in America and Omicron Delta Kappa, the National Leadership honor society founded in 1914 to recognize achievement in scholarship, campus/community service and the performing arts.
