= The Climb (1999 film) =

- DVD Cover Art for The Climb Re-Release
- Directed by: Bob Swaim
- Written by: Vince McKewin
- Produced by: Executive Producers; Robert Rea; Mark McClafferty Producers; Mark McClafferty; Pamela Edwards McClafferty; Tom Parkinson
- Starring: John Hurt; Gregory Smith; David Strathairn; Stephen McHattie; Seth Smith; Sarah Buxton; Marla Sokoloff; Matthew Ness
- Cinematography: Allen Guilford
- Edited by: Marie Sophie Dubus
- Music by: Gréco Casadesus
- Distributed by: Spellbound Pictures
- Release date: 1999
- Running time: 94 minutes
- Country: New Zealand
- Language: English
- Budget: $US6 million

The Climb is a 1999 dramatic film directed by Bob Swaim starring John Hurt, Gregory Smith, David Strathairn, and Marla Sokoloff. An unlikely pair develops a relationship in search of freedom from the inequities and colliding with the inevitabilities of life. It was re-released on DVD 21 August 2007.

== Plot ==
John Langer (John Hurt), an old civil engineer, has an arsenal full of memories. With irreverent wit, he rattles on, in his irascible humorous style, burning his spicy stories into the imagination of a young neighbour kid, Danny Himes (Gregory Smith). Danny is a gifted, spirited athlete with something to prove.

Langer and Danny seem an unlikely pair, but their relationship soon turns from young caregiver/caretaker to student/mentor to comrades on a quest to free themselves individually from life's inequities and inevitabilities.

It is post World War II. Danny's father, Earl (David Strathairn), did not serve in the military and is considered a coward. Danny excels to overcome his father's reputation while Earl is actually more a man than the town knows.

== Cast ==
| Actor | Role |
|---|---|
| John Hurt | Chuck Langer |
| Gregory Smith | Danny Himes |
| David Strathairn | Earl Himes |
| Stephen McHattie | Jack McLaskin |
| Seth Smith | Andy Sweeney |
| Sarah Buxton | Ruth Langer |
| Marla Sokoloff | Leslie Himes |
| Matthew Ness | Wayne Barto |

== Awards ==
- The UNICEF Award – Berlin German
- Winner of the Jury Grand Prix – Vienna Film Festival
- Pierrot D'or Grand Prix – Pierrot Gourmand Film Festival
- Special Mention – Montreal Film Festival
- The Prix du Public – Giffoni Film Festival
- Best Picture – New Zealand Film Award
- Official Viewer's Choice – Temecula Valley Intern'l Film Festival
- Best Action Adventure – Houston Film Festival
- Best Action Adventure – Flagstaff Film Festival
