= Monika Schnarre =

Canadian actress and model

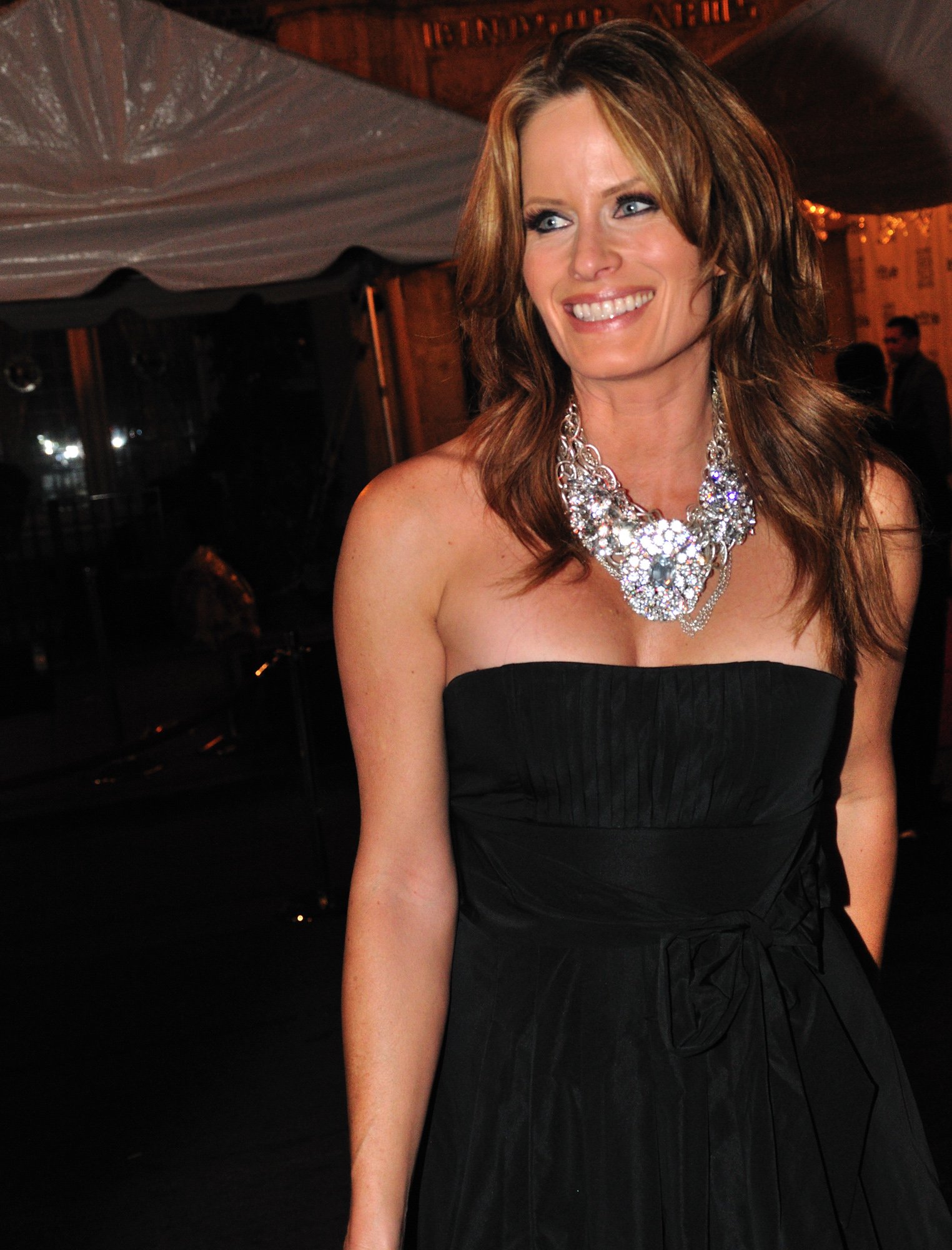
- Schnarre in September 2010
- Born: May 27, 1971 (age 54); Scarborough, Ontario, Canada
- Occupations: Model, actress, television host, real estate agent
- Years active: 1989–present
- Spouse: Storey Badger (m. 2010; div. 2017)
- Children: 1

Monika Schnarre (born May 27, 1971) is a Canadian model, actress, television host, and real estate agent.

== Career ==
In 1986, at age 15, Schnarre won the Ford Models "Supermodel of the World" contest, becoming the youngest model to ever win. She appeared on the cover of American Vogue and in the Sports Illustrated Swimsuit Issue.

In 1989, she wrote a book about her modelling experiences titled Monika: Between You and Me.

She became an actress, appearing in over 50 film and television roles including The Bold and the Beautiful and Beastmaster, and made guest appearances on Beverly Hills 90210, Andromeda, Caroline in the City, The King of Queens and Cracked. Schnarre has also made a number of movies, with roles in Love on the Side, Waxwork II: Lost in Time and Junior. She played Oxanna Kristos in the video game Command & Conquer: Tiberian Sun.

Schnarre went on to study television broadcast journalism at University of California, Los Angeles, and was co-host of Celebrity RSVP, a Canadian entertainment news program. She also was a guest correspondent on etalk and ET Canada.

During the COVID-19 pandemic, Schnarre became a licensed real estate agent and joined the Collingwood, Ontario, office of the luxury realtor Engel & Völkers.

== Personal life ==
Schnarre attended Woburn Collegiate Institute to get her diploma and finished with honours. After that, she moved to California to pursue a career in acting.

She married real estate broker Storey Badger in 2010. They had a son, but divorced in 2017.

== Filmography ==
=== Film ===
Year	Title	Role	Notes
1991	The Death Merchant	Amanda	
1991	Fearless Tiger	Ashley	Video
1992	Waxwork II: Lost in Time	Sarah Brightman	
1993	Warlock: The Armageddon	Model	
1994	Bulletproof Heart (aka Killer)	Laura	
1994	Junior	Angelic Nurse	
1997	The Peacekeeper	Jane Cross	
1998	Sanctuary	Colette Fortier	
2001	Turbulence 3: Heavy Metal	Erica Black	Video
2001	Vegas, City of Dreams	Jessica Garrett	
2001	Snowbound	Liz Bartlett	
2004	Love on the Side	Linda Avery	

=== Television ===
Year	Title	Role	Notes
1989	Friday the 13th: The Series	Sandy Thomerson	Episode: "Face of Evil"
1990	Friday the 13th: The Series	Lisa Caldwell	Episode: "Epitaph for a Lonely Soul"
1991	Designing Women	Lady	Episode: "Fore!"
1991	DEA	Model	Episode: "White Lies"
1991	Tropical Heat	Jenny Shipman	Episode: "This Year's Model"
1994	Boogies Diner	Zoya	
1994	The Bold and the Beautiful	Ivana Vanderveld	
1996	Ed McBain's 87th Precinct: Ice	Augusta Blair	TV film
1995–1996	Beverly Hills, 90210	Elle	Recurring role (4 episodes)
1997	The Adventures of Sinbad	Alana	Episode: "Isle of Bliss"
1997	Silk Stalkings	Kristin Campbell	Episode: "Pretty in Black"
1997	Dead Fire	Kendall Black	TV film
1997	Breaker High	Paprika	Episode: "Silence of the Lamborghini"
1997	Team Knight Rider	Dr. Magda Matleonski	Episode: "The 'A' List"
1998	Dead Man's Gun	Ann Talbot	Episode: "The Gambler"
1998	The New Addams Family	Melinda Carver	Episode: "Fester's Punctured Romance"
1998	Welcome to Paradox	Bio-Rob / Dorothy Duncan	Episode: "Acute Triangle"
1998	Night Man	Zentare	Episode: "It Came from Out of the Sky"
1999	Night Man	Zentare	Episode: "Scent of a Woman"
1999	Earth: Final Conflict	Pearl Bell	Episode: "Second Chances"
1999	Total Recall 2070	Marissa Lett / Rachel Vespers	Episode: "Allure"
1999	The New Addams Family	Rocket Woman	Episode: "Fester the Marriage Counselor"
1999	First Wave	Harlie Daniels	Episode: "The Heist"
1999–2002	BeastMaster	The Sorceress	Recurring role (29 episodes)
2000	Caroline in the City	Lisa	Episode: "Caroline and Joanie and the Stick"
2000	Code Name: Eternity	Claire Lloyd	Episode: "Making Love"
2000	Hollywood Off-Ramp	Unknown	Episode: "Model Behavior"
2001	Andromeda	Lieutenant Jill Pearce	Episode: "The Mathematics of Tears"
2002	Just Cause	Devin	Episode: "Making News"
2003	Charmed	Jenna	Episode: "Lucky Charmed"
2003	The King of Queens	Uli	Episode: "Clothes Encounter"
2004	Mutant X	Riley Morgan	Episode: "The Prophecy"
2005	Andromeda	Marida	Episode: "The Opposites of Attraction"
2006	Underfunded	Juliette Glickman	TV film
2015	Saving Hope	Caroline	Episode: Can't You Hear Me Knocking?
2022	Canada's Drag Race	Herself	Guest judge (1 episode)

=== Video Games ===
Year	Title	Role
1999	Command & Conquer: Tiberian Sun	Oxanna Kristos
