= True Crime (1996 film) =

- Directed by: Pat Verducci
- Written by: Pat Verducci
- Produced by: Jonathan Furie; Andrew Hersh
- Starring: Alicia Silverstone; Kevin Dillon; Bill Nunn; Marla Sokoloff
- Cinematography: Chris Squires
- Edited by: Gib Jaffe
- Music by: Blake Leyh
- Distributed by: Trimark Pictures
- Release date: March 12, 1996
- Running time: 94 minutes
- Country: United States
- Language: English

True Crime also known as Dangerous Kiss, is a 1995 American psychological thriller film directed and written by Pat Verducci and starring Alicia Silverstone and Kevin Dillon.

== Plot ==
Mary Giordano is a beautiful and intelligent Catholic-school senior in Burlingame, California. She is addicted to mystery novels (graphic and otherwise), film noir and detective magazines (hence the movie's title). All of this has inspired her to become a police officer, like her father who was slain in the line of duty years ago. Mary's ambition to this end amuses her siblings John and Vicky, as well as their widowed mother Celia.

Mary gets wind of a case involving the serial killer of several teenage girls, including a handful of her classmates. She launches her own investigation, which gets her in trouble with her late dad's partner, Detective Jerry Guinn. Guinn wants Mary as far away from the field as possible...ostensibly because she just doesn't have what it takes to be a cop, but also out of concern for her well-being. Undaunted, Mary enlists the aid of police cadet Tony Campbell to sniff out the murderer; gradually, the two fall in love.

Ultimately, the name "Tony Campbell" is revealed to be an alias; his real name is Daniel Henry Moffat, and he proves to be the killer both Mary and Guinn are looking for. Moffat outwits and kills Guinn, only to be outwitted by Mary and left hanging for his life. Despite Moffat's pleads for help, a tearful Mary chooses not to save him, allowing Moffat to fall to his death. Just weeks after graduation from the 12th grade, she is seen in a police uniform - having succeeded in her aspiration of following in her father's footsteps and joining the police department.

== Cast ==
- Alicia Silverstone as Mary Giordano
- Kevin Dillon as Cadet Tony Campbell / Daniel Henry Moffat
- Bill Nunn as Detective Jerry Guinn
- Michael Bowen as Earl Parkins
- Marla Sokoloff as Vicki Giordano
- Ann Devaney as Sherry Tarnley
- Joshua Shaefer as John Giordano
- Jennifer Savidge as Celia Giordano
- Tara Subkoff as Liz McConnell
- David Packer as Sergeant Collins
- Alissa Dowdy as Kathleen Donlevy
- Aimee Brooks as Margie Donlevy

== Production ==
The film was produced on location at John Marshall High School in Los Angeles, California.

Though not released until 1995, the film was actually shot a few years earlier, when Silverstone was under the age of 18.

Other titles for the film are Dangerous Kiss and True Detective. It was released directly to video instead of in theaters.
