= Marla Sokoloff =

American actress (born 1980)

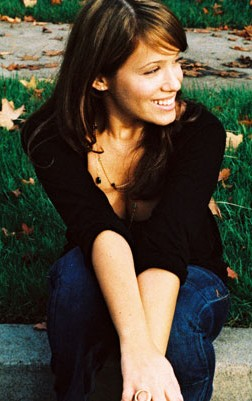
- Sokoloff in a promotional photo
- Born: December 19, 1980 (age 45); San Francisco, California, U.S.
- Occupation: Actress
- Years active: 1993–present
- Spouse: Alec Puro (m. 2009)
- Children: 3

Marla Sokoloff (SOCK-uh-loff; born December 19, 1980) is an American actress. She is known for playing Gia Mahan on Full House and Fuller House, Cokie Mason in The Babysitters Club movie, and Lucy Hatcher on the legal drama series The Practice. She also appeared as Joey's sister Dina on Friends and as the nanny Claire on Desperate Housewives. She has starred in the films True Crime (1996), The Climb (1999), Whatever It Takes (2000), Dude, Where's My Car? (2000), Sugar & Spice (2001), The Tollbooth (2004), Love on the Side (2006), Play the Game (2009), and The Merry Gentlemen (2024).

== Early life ==
Sokoloff was born in San Francisco, to Cindi (née Sussman) and Howard Sokoloff, a former caterer and podiatrist. Her family is Jewish and originates from Russia and Germany. She graduated from the Los Angeles County High School for the Arts, where she studied music and theatre.

== Career ==
In 1993, Sokoloff (then aged 12) began pursuing an acting career when she was cast as Gia Mahan in the popular ABC sitcom Full House. She was originally in-mind to play Topanga Lawrence on ABC's Boy Meets World, and had even filmed a few scenes; however, the part was subsequently given to Danielle Fishel. In 1995, she appeared in the film adaptation of The Babysitters Club as Marguerite “Cokie” Mason, the “bad-girl” and archenemy of the babysitters. In 1998, Sokoloff landed the role of receptionist Lucy Hatcher on the legal television drama series The Practice. Along with other popular appearances, she is well-remembered as Joey's pregnant sister, Dina, on season 8 of Friends. She also had a three-episode stint as nanny Claire on the comedy-drama series Desperate Housewives.

In 2000, she played Maggie Carter in the teen romance film Whatever It Takes.

In November 2006, she starred in the ABC television series Big Day, which ended on January 30, 2007. She also made a guest appearance in an episode of Burn Notice, where she played Melanie, working undercover as a receptionist at a Miami art gallery whose owner had murdered her character's father.

Sokoloff also has starred in several movies, including Whatever It Takes, The Climb, The Tollbooth, Dude, Where's My Car?, Sugar & Spice and Love on the Side.

In 2008, Sokoloff starred alongside Paul Campbell, Andy Griffith, Doris Roberts and Liz Sheridan in the romantic comedy Play the Game. She also voices the Glatorian Kiina in Bionicle: The Legend Reborn. She played Imogene O'Neill in the mini series Meteor.

In 2012, she starred in the television film A Christmas Wedding Date.

She reprised her role as Gia on Full House's sequel series Fuller House, making 11 appearances starting with the second season episode "Girl Talk".

== Personal life ==
Sokoloff dated actor James Franco for five years after they met on the set of Whatever It Takes in 1999.

In 2004, she began dating Deadsy drummer Alec Puro. They married in 2009, and have three daughters.

== Filmography ==
=== Film ===
| Year | Title | Role | Notes |
|---|---|---|---|
| 1993 | So I Married an Axe Murderer | Alcatraz Visitor | |
| 1995 | Freaky Friday | Rachel French | TV movie |
| 1995 | The Baby-Sitters Club | Marguerite "Cokie" Mason | |
| 1996 | True Crime | Vicki Giordano | Video |
| 1997 | The Date | Stacey | Short |
| 1999 | The Climb | Leslie Himes | |
| 2000 | Whatever It Takes | Maggie Carter | |
| 2000 | Dude, Where's My Car? | Wilma | |
| 2001 | Sugar & Spice | Lisa Janusch | |
| 2001 | Prairie Dogs | Starlett | Short |
| 2003 | A Date with Darkness: The Trial and Capture of Andrew Luster | Connie | TV movie |
| 2004 | Freshman Orientation | Marjorie | |
| 2004 | Love on the Side | Eve Stuckley | |
| 2004 | The Tollbooth | Sarabeth Cohen | |
| 2005 | The Drive | Rachel | Short |
| 2005 | Crazylove | Ruth Mayer | |
| 2005 | Christmas in Boston | Gina | TV movie |
| 2009 | Play the Game | Julie Larabee | |
| 2009 | Bionicle: The Legend Reborn | Kiina (voice) | Video |
| 2009 | The Flower Girl | Laurel Haverford | TV movie |
| 2010 | Gift of the Magi | Della Young | TV movie |
| 2011 | Scents and Sensibility | Marianne Dashwood | |
| 2011 | The Chateau Meroux | Wendy | |
| 2012 | A Christmas Wedding Date | Rebecca | TV movie |
| 2016 | Do You Take This Man | Zoe | |
| 2016 | Summer in the City | Mindy | TV movie |
| 2017 | A Happening of Monumental Proportions | Mindy | |
| 2018 | Preschool in L.A. | Miss Allison | Short |
| 2019 | The Road Home for Christmas | Lindsey | TV movie |
| 2020 | Home, But Not Alone | Mom | Short |
| 2023 | Sweet on You | Kate's Mom | TV movie |
| 2024 | The Merry Gentlemen | Marie | Netflix |

=== Television ===
| Year | Title | Role | Notes |
|---|---|---|---|
| 1993 | Boy Meets World | Paige | Episode: "Cory's Alternative Friends" |
| 1993 | The Second Half | Courtney | Episode: "It's My Party" |
| 1993–1995 | Full House | Gia Mahan | Recurring Cast: Season 7–8 |
| 1994 | Step by Step | Marissa | Episode: "Thirteen with a Bullet" |
| 1995 | Home Improvement | Paige | Episode: "Let Them Eat Cake" |
| 1995–1996 | Party of Five | Jody Lynch | Recurring Cast: Season 2, Guest: Season 3 |
| 1996 | 3rd Rock from the Sun | Dina | Episode: "Post-Nasal Dick" |
| 1997 | Over the Top | Gwen Martin | Main Cast |
| 1998 | 7th Heaven | Jen | Episode: "Nothing Endures But Change" |
| 1998–2004 | The Practice | Lucy Hatcher | Main Cast: Season 3–7, Recurring Cast: Season 8 |
| 2001 | Night Visions | Julia | Episode: "My So-Called Life and Death" |
| 2001 | Strange Frequency | Darcy King | Episode: "More Than a Feeling" |
| 2001 | Friends | Dina Tribbiani | Episode: "The One with Monica's Boots" |
| 2004–2005 | Desperate Housewives | Claire | Recurring Cast: Season 1 |
| 2006 | Modern Men | Molly Clark | Recurring Cast |
| 2006–2007 | Big Day | Alice Hopkins | Main Cast |
| 2009 | Burn Notice | Melanie | Episode: "Seek and Destroy" |
| 2009 | Meteor | Imogene O'Neil | Episode: "Part 1 & 2" |
| 2009 | Maneater | Jennifer Ellenback | Episode: "Part 1 & 2" |
| 2009 | Drop Dead Diva | Mia Reynolds | Episode: "Crazy" |
| 2011 | CSI: NY | Abigail West | Episode: "Party Down" |
| 2013 | Melissa & Joey | Dr. Chelsea Mullins | Episode: "Can't Hardly Wait" |
| 2014 | Mind Games | Jane | Episode: "Texts, Lies and Audiotapes" |
| 2014 | The Fosters | Dani Kirkland | Recurring Cast: Season 1–2 |
| 2015 | Grey's Anatomy | Glenda Castillo | Recurring Cast: Season 11 |
| 2015 | Hot in Cleveland | Chloe | Episode: "Kitchen Nightmare" |
| 2016–2020 | Fuller House | Gia Mahan-Harmon | Guest: Season 2, Recurring Cast: Season 3–5 |
| 2018 | Hollywood Darlings | Marla | Episode: "Y2K" |

=== Music videos ===
| Year | Artist | Song | Role |
|---|---|---|---|
| 2001 | Everclear | "Brown Eyed Girl" | Brown Eyed Girl |
| 2013 | Cindy Alexander | "Wonderful" | Girlfriend |
