= Nightmare Beach =

- Italian home video poster by Renato Casaro
- Directed by: Umberto Lenzi; Harry Kirkpatrick (uncredited)
- Written by: Vittorio Rambaldi; Harry Kirkpatrick (as James Justice)
- Produced by: Josi W. Konski; William J. Immermann; Manubhai Patel
- Starring: Nicolas de Toth; Sarah Buxton; Rawley Valverde; Lance LeGault; John Saxon; Michael Parks
- Cinematography: Antonio Climati
- Edited by: John Rawson
- Music by: Claudio Simonetti
- Production company: Elpico Cinematografica
- Distributed by: Overseas Filmgroup
- Release date: 1989
- Running time: 90 minutes
- Countries: United States; Italy
- Language: English

Nightmare Beach (also released as Welcome to Spring Break) is a 1989 slasher film directed by Umberto Lenzi and Harry Kirkpatrick, and starring Nicolas de Toth, Sarah Buxton, John Saxon, and Michael Parks.

== Plot ==
Diablo, the leader of the Demons motorcycle gang, is about to be executed for the murder of a young woman Sarah. Confronting the victim's sister Gail Jackson, he proclaims his innocence and vows to return before being killed via the electric chair. A year passes, and Spring Break has come to Miami. Two football players, Skip Banachek and Ronny Bates, are amongst the partygoers for the week-long festivities.

While Spring Break is occurring, a mysterious biker appears and begins to dispatch people. The back of his bike has a lever that when pulled (combined with a button pushed by the biker) causes the victim to undergo a treatment similar to the electric chair. When Ronny ends up a victim of the mysterious killer, Skip attempts to find Ronny with the help of Gail, who works as a bartender during Spring Break. The duo soon find Ronny and learn that local police chief Strycher and physician Doc Willet have covered up Ronny's death for the partygoers not to worry. However, as the body count rises, Gail and Skip begin to wonder if Diablo made good on his promise to return from the dead or is someone else responsible.

Meanwhile, Trina, Diablo's girlfriend, is relaxing at the gang's old hideout. She puts headphones on and is listening to music when a figure appears. She assumes it's Diablo back from the dead. It's not until he grabs her violently that she realizes it's not. Trina is slammed on the couch, and then the biker pulls a live wire out of the wall and attaches it to Trina's headphones. Volts of electricity run through Trina's body, killing her slowly and painfully.

A confrontation at a local tire yard between Gail and the biker reveals that the killer is Reverend Bates, who thinks Spring Break is nothing more than an excuse for sins. Considering himself a "guardian angel", he feels all sinners must die like Diablo, "death by electrocution". Bates also confesses to being the real killer of Gail's sister. Skip arrives in time and fights off Bates. As the duo run, Bates hops on his bike and goes after them only to trip his bike on a stray tire. Bates goes off the bike onto an electric field and like those he murdered and Diablo, dies by electrocution. The next day, Skip and Gail decide to leave Florida and head to Ohio, where Skip hails from.

== Cast ==
- Nicolas de Toth as Skip Banachek
- Sarah Buxton as Gail Jackson
- John Saxon as Strycher
- Michael Parks as Doc Willet
- Lance LeGault as Reverend Bates
- Rawley Valverde as Ronny Rivera
- Tony Bolano as Edward "Diablo" Santor
- Yamilet Hidalgo as Trina
- Luis Valderrama as Dawg
- Karen Elder as Mustang Driver

== Directorial credit ==
Umberto Lenzi, originally hired to direct, had a falling out with the producer just as production started and wanted to be taken off the film. He stated in a 1996 interview that he found the story "too similar to [his earlier film] Seven Blood-Stained Orchids" and decided before shooting began that his name would not appear on the film. Screenwriter Harry Kirkpatrick (also known as James Justice) was given the job of directing, and received sole directorial credit, though he convinced Lenzi to remain on the set in an uncredited advisory capacity throughout the entire production. For years, many horror film fans thought Harry Kirkpatrick was an alias for Lenzi, but Lenzi has stated in interviews that there really was a Harry Kirkpatrick who wrote and co-directed that film. He explained, "My contribution consisted solely of providing technical assistance. Welcome to Spring Break should be considered the work of Harry Kirkpatrick.". Italian film historian Roberto Curti stated later that Lenzi directed the film but refused to sign to it, allowing the credit to be assigned to Harry Kirkpatrick.

== Soundtrack ==
- Kirsten – "Don't Take My Heart"
- Kirsten – "Say the Word"
- Animal – "Rock Like an Animal"
- Derek St. Holmes and Ron Bloom – "Eye of the Hunter"
- Derek St. Holmes and Ron Bloom – "I Knew How to Rock"
- Rondinelli – "Bad Love So Right"
- Rondinelli – "Mean N' Nasty"
- Rondinelli – "Fear No Evil"
- Juanita – "Do What You Do"
- Rough Cutt – "Dynamite"

== Critical reception ==
AllMovie gave the film a positive review, stating that the film was "Recommended for cheeseball-loving genre enthusiasts everywhere." Brett Gallman from Oh, the Horror! wrote in his review on the film, "Welcome to Spring Break is just a unabashed conflation of boobs and blood, a sex comedy movie that treats its characters like blow-up dolls to be punctured by a madman. If The Burning is a perfect blend of camp comedies and slashers, then this is its trashier, beachy counterpart."

Sam Bowron from Digital Retribution awarded the film a score of three out of five, writing, "Every facet of Welcome to Spring break screams of a film that was a prime product of its time, even though its creators traveled half way across the globe to make it happen. Simply put, if you're a fan of 80s cheese and sleaze you'll revel in this movie's surplus exploits and have a giddy time in the process. Otherwise, maybe wait until after graduation before having that celebratory case of Heineken."
