= Devil's Highway (film) =

- DVD cover
- Directed by: Fabien Pruvot
- Written by: Jennifer Farrell
- Produced by: Michael Lustig; Fabien Pruvot
- Starring: Shane Brolly; Robert Miano; Al Sapienza; Natassia Malthe
- Cinematography: Grisha Alasadi
- Edited by: Ken Cravens
- Music by: Billy Mallery
- Production company: Tomas Pictures
- Distributed by: Image Entertainment
- Release date: 2005
- Running time: 91 minutes
- Country: United States
- Language: English

Devil's Highway is a 2005 American supernatural horror film directed by Fabien Pruvot and written by Jennifer Farrell. The film stars Shane Brolly, Robert Miano, Al Sapienza, and Natassia Malthe as passengers on a bus who are targeted by a demon.

The film screened at the New York International Independent Film and Video Festival, where it won awards for Best Feature and Best Cinematography, before being released on DVD by Image Entertainment in 2007.

== Plot ==
Roger, a thief, picks up a female hitchhiker. Later, he boards a tour bus headed to Las Vegas; the woman is no longer with him. Roger goes missing at the bus' first stop, and, thereafter, another passenger disappears at each stop. The missing passengers are later revealed to be the victims of a demon that can jump from body to body, able to possess them at will. As each character's back story and secrets are revealed, they are targeted by the demon.

== Cast ==
- Shane Brolly as Roger
- Robert Miano as Joe
- Al Sapienza as Hector
- Natassia Malthe as Michelle
- Sarah G. Buxton as Woman
- Corbin Timbrook as Father O'Connell
- Jennifer Farrell as Lisa
- Dayton Knoll as Scott
- Wilmer Calderon as Manuel
- Natalie Alexander as Edna
- Robert Ambrose as Charlie
- Kacia Brady as Randi
- Nicholas Pajon as Bob

== Production ==
Devil's Highway was directed by Fabien Pruvot.

== Release ==
The film premiered at the New York International Independent Film and Video Festival in 2005. It was later distributed on DVD by Image Entertainment on February 27, 2007.

== Reception ==
Jon Condit of Dread Central rated it 1/5 stars and wrote that it does not effectively use its "relatively interesting concept". Serene Dominic of the Metro Times called it "part Dante's Inferno and part Murder on the Orient Express". Thomas Spurlin of DVD Talk rated it 3/5 stars and wrote, "[T]he visual crispness and simple, character-driven plot within this eerie mystery makes this one worth a watch."

== Accolades ==
Devil's Highway won Best Feature and Best Cinematography at the 2005 New York International Independent Film and Video Festival.

== Home media ==
Image Entertainment released the film on DVD on February 27, 2007.
