= Japan (2008 film) =

- Directed by: Fabien Pruvot
- Written by: Fabien Pruvot
- Produced by: Ron Althoff; Petr Buk; Bianca Chiminello; John Corser; Robert Flaxman; Peggy Hovsepian; Fabien Pruvot; Bella Vendramini
- Starring: Shane Brolly; Peter Fonda; Bianca Chiminello; Tania Raymonde; Treva Etienne; Patrick Muldoon
- Cinematography: Ryan Nguyen
- Edited by: Ken Cravens; Jeff Turkali
- Music by: Bernie Torelli
- Distributed by: Tomas Pictures
- Release date: 2008
- Country: United States
- Language: English

Japan is a 2008 American independent film written and directed by Fabien Pruvot.

== Plot ==
The film follows a contract killer who goes by the code name Japan. He meets a man named Alfred at a hotel, who was recently evicted from his home. The two get along and Japan befriends Alfred. Their friendship leads the film into a twist and turn ending.

== Production ==
The film was shot in Los Angeles, California, and Phoenix, Arizona.
