= Penny Templeton =

American acting teacher

Penny Templeton is an American acting teacher based in New York City. Her primary focus is adapting the techniques of the great master teachers (Konstantin Stanislavski, the Method/Lee Strasberg, Sanford Meisner etc.), to make them accessible tools for use in today's under rehearsed, fast-paced world of acting.

== Career ==
Templeton is a fourth generation theatre actress. She began studying and performing under such teachers as Paul Sorvino and Wynn Handman. Highlights of her career include starring in Joyce Carol Oates' I Stand Before You Naked at the American Palace Theater, and as Paul Sorvino's wife in All the King's Men.

In 1990 Templeton began privately coaching actors and in 1994 opened the Penny Templeton Studio. She has offered her expertise in national magazines, served as a finalist judge for the Cable Ace Awards, Daytime Emmy Awards, and the New York Film Festival. In addition, she taught "Acting for the Camera" for the Masters Program at Columbia University. Among Templeton's directorial credits are the one-man shows, "The F Train" and "The Idiots Guide to Life", and the off Broadway play, "The Rise of Dorothy Hale." She is featured in the books Acting Teachers of America by Ronald Rand, and Promoting Your Acting Career by Glen Alterman. In 2011 Templeton published her acting book, Acting Lions: Unleash Your Craft in Today's Lightning Fast World of Film, Television and Theatre.

== Templeton's acting techniques ==
Templeton's acting theory believes that it is essential to use tools like a video camera, improvisation, sensory and substitutions to teach the craft of acting and to deepen the actor's organic instrument. According to Templeton, this kind of work not only develops the actor's camera technique, but also reinforces basic theatre training. Templeton believes that when truth is projected onto the screen and magnified a hundred times for the actor to watch, he can very quickly make adjustments.
