= Dark Angel (1996 film) =

American thriller film by Robert Iscove

- Film poster
- Genre: Mystery; Thriller
- Teleplay by: John Romano
- Story by: John Romano; Randall Wallace
- Directed by: Robert Iscove
- Starring: Eric Roberts; Ashley Crow; Linden Ashby; Gina Torres; Paul Calderon
- Music by: Michael Wolff
- Country of origin: United States
- Original language: English

Production
- Executive producers: Francis Ford Coppola; Fred Fuchs; John Romano
- Producers: Elisa Kohn Taub; Robert Iscove
- Cinematography: Francis Kenny
- Editor: Casey O. Rohrs
- Running time: 90 minutes
- Production companies: American Zoetrope; Trotwood Productions; Big Ticket Television

Original release
- Network: Fox
- Release: September 10, 1996

Dark Angel is a 1996 American mystery thriller television film produced and directed by Robert Iscove and written by John Romano, from a story by Romano and Randall Wallace. It stars Eric Roberts as a police detective on the trail of a serial killer in New Orleans. Ashley Crow, Linden Ashby, Gina Torres, and Paul Calderon co-star.

The film was originally produced for Fox as the pilot episode of a series that never materialized. It aired on the network on September 10, 1996.

== Plot ==
New Orleans Police Department detective Walter D'Arcangelo is the only link to a serial killer who preys on adulterous women. In order to clear his name, Walter must solve the case before the killer strikes again.

== Cast ==
- Eric Roberts as Walter D'Arcangelo
- Ashley Crow as Anna St. Cyr
- Linden Ashby as Harry Foley
- Gina Torres as LaMayne
- Paul Calderon as Vance Pickett
- V. P. Oliver as Jerome
- Nicholas Pryor as Richard
- Wayne Péré as Vardamon
- Joel Polis as Jastrow
- Ray Baker as Wentworth

== Production ==
Fox originally announced Dark Angel as a series in development for the 1996–97 television schedule, and produced this film as its pilot episode. Filming took place on location in New Orleans.

== Release ==
The film premiered on Fox on September 10, 1996, as part of the network's Tuesday Night Movie series.

=== Reception ===
Carole Horst from Variety wrote: "Script by TV vet John Romano doesn't flag as mystery unfolds at a leisurely pace, although Roberts gets the only fully fleshed out character, delivering a sexy, wiseguy performance. Most everyone else has to walk that line between hip irony and outright overacting. Most fall on the wrong side. Robert Iscove's direction is crisp and straightforward; Linda Burton's production design and Francis Kenny's camera make good use of the flavor of the city."
