= The Voice of the Turtle (play) =

Play written by John Van Druten

- Original language: English
- Written by: John William Van Druten
- Characters: Sally Middleton; Bill Page; Olive Lashbrooke
- Genre: Comedy; Romance
- Setting: New York City, a weekend in early April

Premiere
- Date: December 8, 1943
- Place: Morosco Theatre; New York City

The Voice of the Turtle is a Broadway comedy by John William Van Druten dealing with the challenges of the single life in New York City during World War II. Controversial in its time, The Voice of the Turtle explores the sexual struggles of Sally Middleton, a young woman attempting to reconcile her childhood teachings on the importance of chastity with her newfound affection for Bill Page. The play derives its name from a verse in the Song of Solomon in the Bible, which reads "The voice of the turtle [as in turtle dove] is heard in our land." (2:10–13) On December 8, 1943, the show opened at the Morosco Theatre and ran for 1,557 performances, making it the 51st longest-running show and the 9th longest-running play in Broadway history. In 1947, the stage play was adapted into a film of the same name starring Ronald Reagan, Eleanor Parker, Eve Arden, and Wayne Morris.

== Plot synopsis ==
The story begins on a Friday afternoon in early April as aspiring actress Sally Middleton has just finished moving into her new apartment in the East Sixties. Even though she has just left her home in Joplin, Missouri, for life in the big city, the married Broadway producer she has been seeing is quick to dump her when he begins to feel she is ruining their relationship by falling in love with him. Heartbroken, Sally confides her uncertainties in her friend Olive Lashbrooke, a promiscuous, worldly girl, questioning the practicality of the lessons in chastity she received as a child and wondering if she is alone in her passion, or if other women share these sensations.

Unbeknownst to Sally, Olive has a date planned with Bill Page, a sergeant in the United States Army who happens to be on leave for the weekend, and she has arranged for him to meet her at Sally's new apartment. At the last minute, however, Olive is asked on a date by another man, and she decides to stand up Bill for what she considers to be the better offer. Bill, still bitter over a love affair gone wrong from five years past, finds himself yet again hurt by love, and to make matters worse he has no hotel reservation, nor is there a nearby friend with whom he can stay. Devoid of any alternative, the two strangers find themselves bound together in Sally's apartment for the weekend, where they are forced to confront their fears of fidelity and their ever-growing interest in each other.

== Productions ==
=== Original Broadway production ===
The Voice of the Turtle debuted on Broadway at the Morosco Theatre on December 8, 1943, where the show ran until October 13, 1947, when it briefly transferred to the Martin Beck Theatre. On November 25, 1947, the play transferred once more to the Hudson Theatre, where it ran until its closing on January 3, 1948. Altogether, The Voice of the Turtle ran for 1,557 performances, making it the fourth longest-running Broadway play at that time. Written and staged by John William Van Druten, the show was produced by Alfred De Liagre, Jr., with Alexander Haas in charge of conducting and music arrangement. The opening night cast included Margaret Sullavan as Sally Middleton, Elliott Nugent as Bill Page, and Audrey Christie as Olive Lashbrooke.

=== Off-Broadway ===
Roundabout Theatre Company mounted a production in 1985, with J. Smith Cameron as Sally Middleton, Chris Sarandon as Bill Page, and Patricia Elliott as Olive Lashbrooke, directed by Robert Berlinger.

=== Off-Off Broadway ===
A revival of The Voice of the Turtle opened off-off-Broadway at the Blue Heron Arts Center in 2001 under the direction of Carl Forsman. Elizabeth Bunch was cast as Sally Middleton, with Nick Toren and Megan Byrne portraying the characters of Bill Page and Olive Lashbrooke, respectively.

== Critical reception ==
Reviews of the original production praised it as "the most delightful comedy of the season" (New York Times) and "a romantic comedy that is at once witty, tender, and wise" (New York Herald Tribune). Many critics highlighted the novelty of a play with only three actors, as well as Stewart Chaney's functional set. Catholic leaders and conservative critics complained that the play "wrapp[ed] up its sexual immorality in sweetness" (Washington Post). In contrast, one soldier, who was among the many service members given free tickets to The Voice of the Turtle during World War II, complained that the play was too tame, remarking, "the sergeants we know would've worn Miss Sullavan's lipstick down to the fabric in the first five minutes of the play."

Theatre historian Jordan Schildcrout notes that reviews of the 2001 revival read the play in relation to the attacks of September 11, asserting that the play was about "finding hope for the future in a dark time."
