= Ian Buchanan =

Scottish actor

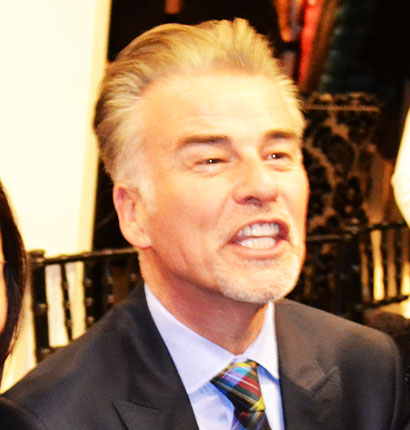
- Ian Buchanan in November 2013
- Born: 16 June 1957 (age 69); Hamilton, Lanarkshire, Scotland
- Occupation: Actor
- Years active: 1986–present

Ian Buchanan (born 16 June 1957) is a Scottish television actor who has appeared on multiple American soap operas including General Hospital, Port Charles, The Bold and the Beautiful, All My Children, and Days of Our Lives. He is also known for his work in two David Lynch shows – playing Dick Tremayne in the second season of Twin Peaks (1990-1991) and Lester Guy in On the Air.

== Career ==
Buchanan was born in Hamilton, South Lanarkshire. After studying acting in New York at the Lee Strasberg Theatre Institute and privately with Marcia Haufrecht, Buchanan's first major daytime role came in 1986, when he joined the cast of General Hospital in the role of Duke Lavery, whom he portrayed until 1989. After leaving the role of Lavery, Buchanan appeared in roles on prime-time series including It's Garry Shandling's Show as Ian McFyfer from 1988 to 1990, and in the second season of Twin Peaks as Dick Tremayne in 1991.

In 1990, he played Sean Brantley, a wealthy Playboy-style magazine publisher in the Columbo television series episode Columbo Cries Wolf. He also guest-starred in episode 4 of the 1990 series The Flash as the villain Stan Kovacs. He appeared in a 1993 episode of Quantum Leap, titled "Blood Moon".

In 1993, Buchanan returned to daytime and was cast on The Bold and the Beautiful in his second most recognized daytime role as Dr. James Warwick, which he portrayed until 1999. Buchanan has since reprised his role as Warwick in several guest appearances from 2004 to 2011. Following the end of his regular appearance as Warwick, Buchanan made a short appearance on Days of Our Lives in 2001 as Lord Sheraton.

In 2002, he joined the cast of Port Charles portraying the sinister Joshua Temple until the show's end in 2003.

In 2005, Buchanan joined the cast of All My Children, in the role of Greg Madden, a fertility specialist involved in the controversial "un-abortion" storyline involving Erica Kane (Susan Lucci), as well as the abduction of the daughter of Dixie Martin (Cady McClain) and Tad Martin (Michael E. Knight). Buchanan's role as Madden came to an end on 5 July 2006, when his character was killed.

In 2012, Buchanan joined Days of Our Lives in the newly created contract role of Ian McAllister, who is the husband of Madison James (Sarah Brown) and a former lover of Kate Roberts DiMera (Lauren Koslow), but was let go in August, as the result of a shift in the direction of the series.

On 27 August 2012, Buchanan returned to General Hospital as Duke Lavery after a 23-year absence. On 12 November, it was revealed that Buchanan was playing a dual role. Duke was actually Cesar Faison in disguise, and Faison was holding the real Duke hostage. On 5 July 2017, it was announced Buchanan would reprise his role as James Warwick on The Bold and the Beautiful.

== Personal life ==
Buchanan identifies as gay, and is married to his husband Antonio Hendricks.

== Filmography ==
n.b. for credit listings reference

=== Film ===
Year	Title	Role	Notes
1988	The Seventh Sign	Mr. Huberty	
1993	Blue Flame	Wax	
1993	The Cool Surface	Terrence	
1994	Double Exposure	Roger Putnam	
1998	Ivory Tower	Andy Pallack	
2000	Lying in Wait	George	
2002	Panic Room	Evan Kurlander	
2009	Make the Yuletide Gay	Peter Stanford	
2015	Always	Oliver	
2021	Dark Shadows and Beyond – The Jonathan Frid Story	Self (narration)	

=== Television ===
Year	Title	Role	Notes	ref
1986	The Equalizer	Harried Man	Episode: "Pretenders"	
1986–2020	General Hospital	Duke Lavery	1986–1989 (contract); 2012–2015 (recurring); 2016, 2017, 2020 (special guest)	
1988–1990	It's Garry Shandling's Show	Ian McFyfer	20 episodes	
1990	Columbo	Sean Brantley	Episode: "Columbo Cries Wolf"	
1990	The Flash	Stan Kovacs	Episode: "Honor Among Thieves"	
1990-1991	Twin Peaks	Dick Tremayne	11 episodes	
1992	On the Air	Lester Guy	7 episodes	
1992	The Larry Sanders Show	Johnathan Litman	Episode: "The New Producer"	
1993	Quantum Leap	Victor	Episode: "Blood Moon"	
1993	Marilyn & Bobby: Her Final Affair	Peter Lawford	Television film	
1993–1999, 2004, 2008–2009, 2011, 2017	The Bold and the Beautiful	Dr. James Warwick	Contract: 1993–1999; Recurring role: 2004, 2008–2009, 2011, 2017	
1995	The Young and the Restless	Dr. James Warwick	2 episodes (February 24, 1995 and April 7, 1995)	
1995	The Nanny	Julius Kimble	Episode: "Dope Diamond"	
1995	Gargoyles	Constantine (voice)	Episode: "Avalon"	
1996	NYPD Blue	Prince Laszlo Forsmann	Episode: "Where'd the Van Gogh?"	
1998	The New Batman Adventures	Connor (voice)	Episode: "Old Wounds"	
1999	Batman Beyond	Abel Cuvier (voice)	Episode: "Splicers"	
2000	Norm	Jack/Fernando	Episode: "Norm vs. the Sacrifice"	
2001	Days of Our Lives	Lord Sheraton	4 episodes	
2001	Nash Bridges	Franz Planck	Episode: "The Partner"	
2001	Charmed	Raynor	2 episodes	
2002	Raising Dad	Dr. Fields	Episode: "Daughter Nose Best"	
2002–2003	Port Charles	Joshua Temple	Recurring	
2002–2003	Justice League	Ultra-Humanite (voice)	3 episodes	
2003	Stargate SG-1	First	Episode: "Unnatural Selection"	
2004	Alias	Johannes Gathird	Episode: "After Six"	
2004	Hope & Faith	Himself	2 episodes	
2005	Yes, Dear	Paul	Episode: "The Radford Reshuffle"	
2005–2006	All My Children	Dr. Greg Madden	25 episodes	
2007	Nip/Tuck	Damien Sands	Episode: "Damien Sands"	
2009	Batman: The Brave and the Bold	Sherlock Holmes (voice)	Episode: "Trials of the Demon!"	
2019	A Mermaid for Christmas	Narrator	Television film	

== Awards and nominations ==
Year	Award	Category	Work	Result
1988	4th Soap Opera Digest Awards	Outstanding Newcomer: Daytime	General Hospital	Won
1988	4th Soap Opera Digest Awards	Favorite Super Couple: Daytime – shared with Finola Hughes	General Hospital	Nominated
1989	5th Soap Opera Digest Awards	Favorite Super Couple: Daytime – shared with Finola Hughes	General Hospital	Nominated
1989	5th Soap Opera Digest Awards	Outstanding Hero: Daytime	General Hospital	Nominated
1997	24th Daytime Emmy Awards	Outstanding Supporting Actor in a Drama Series	The Bold and the Beautiful	Won
1998	25th Daytime Emmy Awards	Outstanding Supporting Actor in a Drama Series	The Bold and the Beautiful	Nominated
1999	15th Soap Opera Digest Awards	Outstanding Actor in a Supporting Role	The Bold and the Beautiful	Nominated
