= Panic Button (1964 film) =

- Directed by: George Sherman; Giuliano Carnimeo
- Written by: Hal Biller; Morton Friedman
- Starring: Maurice Chevalier; Eleanor Parker; Jayne Mansfield
- Release dates: April 1964 (U.S.); 1967 (Finland)
- Running time: 90 mins
- Country: Italy
- Languages: English; Italian

Panic Button is a 1964 low-budget Italian-produced comedy film starring, Maurice Chevalier, Eleanor Parker, Jayne Mansfield, and Mike Connors. Filmed in the summer of 1962, in Italy, and released nearly two years later, the film tells the story of how a washed-up actor (Chevalier) and a buxom unknown (Mansfield) are chosen to co-star in a television production of Romeo and Juliet. The picture is known for being one of several foreign films Mansfield was forced to make after her contract was dropped from 20th Century Fox in 1962.

== Cast ==
- Maurice Chevalier as Philippe Fontaine
- Eleanor Parker as Louise Harris
- Jayne Mansfield as Angela
- Mike Connors as Frank Pagano (billed as: Michael Connors)
- Akim Tamiroff as Pandowski
- Carlo Croccolo as Guido
- Vincent Barbi as Mario

== Releases ==
The film was opened to a brief release in Italy in 1962, and was officially released in the United States in April 1964. At most theaters, Panic Button served as a secondary feature and not a success.
