= Sunset Beach (TV series) =

American television series

- Genre: Soap opera
- Created by: Josh Griffith; Robert Guza Jr.; Charles Pratt Jr.
- Theme music composer: Tim Truman; Dominic Messinger
- Country of origin: United States
- Original language: English
- No. of seasons: 3
- No. of episodes: 755

Production
- Executive producers: Gary Tomlin; Aaron Spelling; E. Duke Vincent
- Camera setup: Multiple-camera setup
- Running time: 60 minutes (including commercials)
- Production companies: NBC Studios; Spelling Daytime Television

Original release
- Network: NBC
- Release: January 6, 1997 – December 31, 1999

Sunset Beach is an American television soap opera that aired on NBC from January 6, 1997, to December 31, 1999. The show follows the loves and lives of the people living in the Orange County coastal area named Sunset Beach, on the coast of California. Although there is a real community named Sunset Beach (now part of the city of Huntington Beach), the show's beach scenes were shot in nearby Seal Beach, California. The show was co-produced by NBC and Spelling Television.

Sunset Beach won two Daytime Emmy Awards and was nominated another eleven times. The show also received 22 nominations for various other awards.

== Conception and development ==
Developed as a co-production between its NBC Studios unit and Spelling Television (which formed a standalone daytime production subsidiary specifically for the program), Sunset Beach was ordered to series by NBC in 1996, in an attempt to both rebuild the network's daytime lineup and target younger audiences. Charles Pratt Jr. (who would also serve as an executive consultant), Robert Guza Jr. and Josh Griffith were hired to develop the concept for the new series. Pratt, Guza and Griffith had met in 1988 when the latter two joined series veteran Pratt as writers for the NBC soap opera Santa Barbara; Pratt and Guza first met Spelling in 1992, when the two became part of the original writing staff of Melrose Place, and went on to work on its short-lived spinoff Models Inc.

Sunset Beach was the first (and only) daytime soap opera produced by Aaron Spelling, and NBC's first new serial since the 1991 cancellation of Generations (which was also produced by the network's production division). Spelling had experience in the genre producing several primetime soap operas (most notably Dynasty, Melrose Place and Beverly Hills, 90210), and was also the executive producer of the 1991 film Soapdish, a satirical look at daytime soap operas.

Jonathan Levin, one of the show's consulting producers, commented on the change that a new soap opera brings to the lineup, and the tough process of a viewer getting to know a new soap: "It is very difficult to change the loyalty of the daytime viewer, and we’re talking about shows that have been on for 30 years. That's one of the reasons we’re targeting young viewers — they’re the most available and the most flexible in their viewing habits."

In the process of making the show, Spelling liked the idea of naming it Never Say Goodbye, as suggested by Viacom chairman Sumner Redstone during a dinner with Spelling, but later tests proved that the viewers were more drawn to the title Sunset Beach. The soap opera debuted on January 6, 1997.

== Cast and crew ==
Cast circa 1997. First row: Cole, Annie, Tim Second row: Caitlin, Mark, Meg, Eddie Third row: Tiffany, Ricardo, Paula, Ben, Vanessa, Michael, Sean

When the show began, it had 21 contract actors, including Lesley-Anne Down (Olivia Richards), Sam Behrens (Gregory Richards), Leigh Taylor-Young (Elaine Stevens), Peter Barton (Eddie Connors), Laura Harring (Paula Stevens), Hank Cheyne (Ricardo Torres) and Kathleen Noone (Bette Katzenkazrahi). In its first year and a half on air, seven actors left the show. Adrienne Frantz was the first to be let go from her role of Tiffany Thorne. The character was recast to Jennifer Banko-Stewart, but this was not successful and she was eventually written out. Kelly Hu left the show in June 1997, due to her character not mixing well with the others. By the end of the year, when Meg Bennett took over as a new head writer, Taylor-Young and Harring also left the series, followed by the exit of Nick Stabile, whose character Mark Wolper was written out in a serial killer storyline. Elizabeth Alley had a short stint playing the role of Melinda Fall. The final original character to be written out was Eddie Connors (Barton), who exited in May 1998.

Shortly after the show premiered, Dominique Jennings, V. P. Oliver, and Russell Curry joined the cast as Virginia Harrison, Jimmy Harrison, and Tyus Robinson respectively. Oliver was let go in December 1997, and his character was recast with a younger actor, Jeffery Wood. Both Jennings and Wood were written out by March 1999, exactly two years after the introduction of their characters. The remaining 14 original characters stayed on the show until its end, and three of those characters were recast during the three-year run. The first recast happened soon after the show started airing. The role of Cole Deschanel a male jewel thief, initially played by Ashley Hamilton, was recast to Eddie Cibrian. In mid-1998, Vanessa Dorman vacated the role of Cole's partner Caitlin Deschanel due to a change in storyline direction, and Kam Heskin was cast. The final recast was a temporary one. When Susan Ward left to film a movie, Sydney Penny stepped in to replace her, with Ward later returning to play the character for the show's final few weeks.

The exits of many characters opened the doors to the introduction of new ones. Carol Potter and John H. Martin, who had been recurring during the show's first year, were promoted to contract status, and the expansion of Meg's family also included the arrival of her sister Sara Cummings. The role was first played by then-unknown actress Lauren Woodland, but she was fired two weeks later and replaced by Shawn Batten, who played the role for the remainder of the series. Aside from Meg's family, Ricardo Torres got his family expanded, including the introduction of his mother Carmen (Margarita Cordova), brother Antonio (Nick Kiriazis), and the sudden reappearance of his sister Maria (Christina Chambers), Ben Evans' presumed dead wife.

The teen scene was revived in 1998, when Bette's daughter Emily Davis (Cristi Harris) arrived in town and fell in love with Sean, prompting Amy (Krissy Carlson) and Brad (Michael Strickland) to intervene. The final teen cast was Leo Deschanel, Cole's brother (David Mathiessen), but he was quickly written out. A long-time legend and Cole's father, A.J. Deschanel, was also cast in the form of Gordon Thomson, and a female jewel thief named Francesca (Lisa Guerrero) was added to the cast in mid-1998. However, Guerrero was written out in early 1999 since her character was killed by Gregory.

In 1999, the show cast only three contract roles, the first two being in March, when Tracy Lindsey Melchior and Chasen Parker stunned the soap with their sudden arrival in town. The final role to be cast on the show was the one played by Sean Kanan in late August. Things changed at the end of the year, when Cibrian left the show to pursue a career in primetime. Several other cast members, including a few original ones, considered leaving, but the show's cancellation came before they could make a decision.

During its three-year run, Sunset Beach was executive produced by Aaron Spelling, E. Duke Vincent, and Gary Tomlin. However, the head writing history was much different. Robert Guza Jr. was the first head writer (and also a co-creator), but he exited the show on October 21, 1997, when Meg Bennett, who had been serving as Associate Head Writer, was promoted as head writer as of October 22. Four months after being the sole head writer, Bennett received a co-head writer in the form of Christopher Whitesell, with a one-year deal as external consultant of Ryan Carrassi, from Days of Our Lives on January 8, 1998. Carrassi, after the show cancellation, was involved in the pilot of Passions. Bennett was dismissed during the summer of 1998, and her final episode aired October 5, 1998. She was replaced by Margaret DePriest, who stayed with the show until its cancellation.

=== Main cast ===
In first opening credits order

Character	Actor	Year(s)	Episodes
Olivia Richards	Lesley-Anne Down	1997–99	1―755
Gregory Richards	Sam Behrens	1997–99	1―755
Ricardo Torres	Hank Cheyne	1997–99	1―755
Paula Stevens	Laura Harring	1997	1―236
Gabi Martinez Torres	Priscilla Garita	1997–99	30―755
Casey Mitchum	Timothy Adams	1997–99	1―755
Rae Chang	Kelly Hu	1997	2―108
Elaine Stevens	Leigh Taylor-Young	1997	1―236
Eddie Connors	Peter Barton	1997–99	1―342
Michael Bourne	Jason Winston George	1997–99	1―755
Vanessa Hart	Sherri Saum	1997–99	4―755
Bette Katzenkazrahi	Kathleen Noone	1997–99	1―755
Annie Douglas Richards	Sarah Buxton	1997–99	1―755
Ben Evans	Clive Robertson	1997–99	1―755
Meg Cummings	Susan Ward	1997–99	1―669, 726―755
Meg Cummings	Sydney Penny	1999	673―723
Tim Truman	Dax Griffin	1997–99	1―722, 755
Sean Richards	Randy Spelling	1997–99	5―755
Tiffany Thorne	Adrienne Frantz	1997	1―93
Tiffany Thorne	Jennifer Banko-Stewart	1997	96―159
Mark Wolper	Nick Stabile	1997–98	1―258
Cole Deschanel	Ashley Hamilton	1997	11―32
Cole Deschanel	Eddie Cibrian	1997–99	34―700, 755
Caitlin Richards Deschanel	Vanessa Dorman	1997–98	7―364
Caitlin Richards Deschanel	Kam Heskin	1998–99	368―755
Virginia Harrison	Dominique Jennings	1997–99	50―542
Jimmy Harrison	V.P. Oliver	1997	52―242
Jimmy Harrison	Jeffery Wood	1998–99	261―555
Tyus Robinson	Russell Curry	1997–99	118―580, recurring 587―755
Derek Evans	Clive Robertson	1998–99	256―374, 467, 673―744
Hank Cummings	John Martin	1997–99	270―755, recurring 175―196
Joan Cummings	Carol Potter	1997–99	270―755, recurring 1―232
Sara Cummings	Lauren Woodland	1998	328―336
Sara Cummings	Shawn Batten	1998–99	337―755
Antonio Torres	Nick Kiriazis	1998–99	271―755
A.J. Deschanel	Gordon Thomson	1998–99	337―755
Emily Davis	Cristi Harris	1998–99	347―755
Maria Torres-Evans	Christina Chambers	1998–99	373―755
Francesca Vargas	Lisa Guerrero	1998–99	382―579, recurring 592―610
Leo Deschanel	David Matthiessen	1998–99	386―556
Amy Nielsen	Krissy Carlson	1997–99	425―755, recurring 242―416
Brad Niklaus	Michael Strickland	1998–99	425―755, recurring 359―416
Tess Marin	Tracy Melchior	1999	541―755
Benjy Evans	Chase Parker	1999	545―755
Jude Cavanaugh	Sean Kanan	1999	664―755

=== Secondary and guest cast ===
Character	Actor	Year(s)
Lena Hart	Mariann Aalda	1998–99
Sister Beatrice	Denise Alexander	1997–98
Melinda Fall	Elizabeth Alley	1998
Officer Sam Spencer	David Andriole	1997–99
Dr. Luisa Estrada	Ana Auther	1998–99
Chief Harris	Fran Bennett	1997
Sister Bertrille	Rebecca Brooks	1998–99
Carl Brock	Gerard Christopher	1997–99
Carmen Torres	Margarita Cordova	1997–99
Quint	Keene Curtis	1997–98
Hillary Nichols	Terry Davis	1998
Jade Sheridan	Sandra Dee Robinson	1997–98
Passenger	David Doyle	1997
Wayne Landry	Henry Gibson	1999
Mrs Moreau	Joyce Guy	1998–99
Selita Jones	Lynn Hamilton	1997–98
Margaret Raynor	Estelle Harris	1999
Officer Oscar Ruiz	Andre Khabbazi	1997–99
Captain James Nelson	Bernie Kopell	1998
Lena Hart	Lillian Lehman	1997–98
Alex Mitchum	Barbara Mandrell	1997–98
Nurse Ronnie	Cyndi Martino	1998
Summons Server	Eddie Mekka	1998
Doug	Steve Nave	1998
Mrs. Alton	Myrna Niles	1999
Charles Dunwoody	John O'Leary	1997
Benjy Evans	Chasen Parker	1999
Del Douglas	John Reilly	1997–99
Bernie Nielsen	Mark Ritter	1998
Philip Vargas	Michael Sabatino	1998
Kendall Moon	Sam Scarber	1998
Bruce	Rick Scarry	1998
Mr. Talley	Mik Scriba	1998
Patricia Steele	Susan Seaforth Hayes	1999
Vincent Duke	Aaron Spelling	1998
Jerry Feller	Jerry Springer	1999
Priest	Charles C. Stevenson Jr.	1999
Jada	J. Karen Thomas	1998–99
Julianna Deschanel	Constance Towers	1997
Wei-Lee Young	Steven Vincent Leigh	1997
Joseph Wapner	Himself	1999

== Storylines ==
Storylines in its nearly three-year run ranged from the traditional to the supernatural. One of the first storylines concerned an Internet romance. Kansas farm girl Meg Cummings discovered her fiancé, Tim Truman, cheating on her on their wedding day. Meg had been talking online with SB, a man who lived in Sunset Beach, California. And after catching Tim with her maid of honor, Meg fled to Sunset Beach in search of SB, who turned out to be wealthy, widowed businessman Ben Evans.

When the moon rises early, just as the Santa Ana winds kicks up out of nowhere, and the sun is just dropping out of sight, whoever you meet at the far side of the pier, is who you're destined to be with. Elaine Stevens (the legend of Sunset Beach)

The first year of the show revolved around Meg's pursuit of Ben (including her briefly breaking into his house, stealing a journal she found there, and dressing up in his late wife's clothes), who was initially not interested in her, and the gradual development of a romance between them. A side plot showed the antagonistic relationship between Meg and Annie Douglas, Ben's longtime best friend. Meg hated Annie for being close to Ben and wanted to cut her out of his life; Annie hated Meg out of jealousy for her developing romance with Ben. Their problems reached a head with a physical fight in a hot tub. Meg's ex-fiancé Tim Truman followed her to Sunset Beach to win her back, and ended up becoming Annie's ally and almost love interest. Once Meg and Annie had overcome their differences, Meg soon had a new problem when she began to suspect Ben was a murderer, although this plot line was developed to lead up to the Terror Island storyline. After the Terror Island/Derek storyline (see below) none of the issues raised were ever mentioned again.

Meg and Ben became one of the show's first couples, along with jewel thief Cole Deschanel and local heiress Caitlin Richards. Cole slept with and impregnated both Caitlin and Caitlin's unhappy alcoholic mother Olivia Richards. Olivia and her fiendish ex-husband, Gregory Richards, planned to steal Caitlin's baby and pass it off as Olivia's (telling Caitlin her baby had died) in order to break up Caitlin's relationship with Cole, who her parents disapproved of because of his criminal past. Caitlin lost the child in a car accident when she found out about her parents' horrible plan, and planned to fake the rest of her pregnancy and adopt a baby to pass off as her own, as she was worried her inability to have children (caused by the accident) would cause problems in her marriage to Cole. She enlisted the help of Annie, who was secretly trying to break up Olivia and Gregory, due to a term in her father's will that stated she would only get her inheritance if she wed Gregory (her father's way of breaking up his marriage to Olivia, who he had been having an affair with) Annie drugged Olivia and stole her baby, telling her the baby had been stillborn. Caitlin (unknowingly) raised her baby half-brother (who was also her step-son, having been fathered by her husband) until a grief-stricken Olivia discovered the truth. Olivia was eventually reunited with her son.

When the show began, it was the only soap on the air featuring Asian-American characters, though they were written off before the end of the first year. The show also had daytime television's only African-American villainess, Virginia Harrison, who schemed to break up lifeguard Michael Bourne and reporter Vanessa Hart so she could have Michael for herself.

=== Prominent storylines ===
In one of the most outrageous storylines on the show, Virginia drugged Vanessa and, using a baster and some stolen sperm, impregnated her with the child of Tyus Robinson, to make it appear Vanessa had been unfaithful to Michael, who was infertile.

The show was known for other outrageous storylines, such as Terror Island in which several of the show's main characters were stranded on an island with a masked serial killer (whose costume bore a close resemblance to that of the killer from Scream) intent on killing them, especially Meg. A handful of characters were killed by the maniac, mostly minor characters introduced as serial killer-fodder, but also one lead character, young runaway made good Mark Wolper. In his dying moments Mark pulled off the killer's mask and audiences were stunned to see Ben's face behind it. As it turned out, Ben had an evil twin, Derek Evans, who plagued Ben and Meg's lives off and on for the rest of the run of the show. Derek was killed after being shot in a struggle with Ben during the show's final weeks, following a long storyline where Derek kidnapped and impersonated his twin for months, sleeping with Ben's wife Maria Torres (having previously also slept with Meg).

Maria Torres, who had wed Ben when she was still a teenager and he was barely in his twenties, had disappeared and been presumed drowned after a boating accident that took place some years prior to the start of the show. Ben was haunted by the terrible secret that he had caught her in bed with Derek (it was later revealed that Derek—who had impersonated Ben to Maria, who was unaware Ben had a twin—had not slept with Maria, as she had stabbed him with scissors when he tried to rape her). Ben's guilt and grief over Maria caused a shadow over his relationship with Meg from the beginning, which worsened when an amnesiac Maria came back from the dead at Ben and Meg's October 1998 wedding. Ben and Maria grew closer while he helped her to regain her memory, and once she did, Ben flip flopped between the two women for much of the rest of the show's run. During the show's last year a strange woman, Tess, turned up on his doorstep with a son she claimed was Ben and Maria's. After a positive paternity test they raised the child, Benjy, together, causing even more problems for Meg, who left Ben and briefly started dating her sister's boyfriend, Casey Mitchum. Derek (who was also wrongfully presumed dead) returned to kidnap Ben again, and it was revealed he and Tess were Benjy's parents.

Another outrageous storyline was the earthquake/tsunami story, in which Sunset Beach was struck by a massive earthquake, trapping many characters – most of them each other's rival – together in life and death situations. While half the cast battled the disaster on land, the rest of the cast was on a pleasure cruise aboard a ship that was overturned – à la The Poseidon Adventure – by a tsunami created by the earthquake.

The tsunami storyline proved so popular that two weeks' worth of episodes were compiled and turned into an hour-long show that was included on NBC's lineup for one night in August 1998. The show took a supernatural turn for a while with some cursed jewels, stolen from a religious icon, that turned those who'd touched them into shrivelled mummies. The story culminated on Christmas Eve with the return of the jewels to the Madonna just in time to prevent the deaths of several key characters.

The show also featured two murder mysteries in its run. The first was the murder of Annie's father Del Douglas by Elaine Stevens. Del had kidnapped Cole as a baby and convinced Elaine the child was dead. The second murder mystery involved the death of seductress and jewel thief Francesca Vargas, whom just about everyone in town wanted dead. The twist in the Who Shot Francesca storyline and the killer was main antagonist character Gregory Richards.

=== Cancellation ===
The show was cancelled just before the third anniversary of its original air date. Most of the main characters were given happy endings. Ben and Meg and Michael and Vanessa married in a double wedding. Casey and Sara got engaged, Cole and Caitlin were happy in their marriage, and Olivia was happily raising her children alone. Maria gave Ben a divorce so he could marry Meg and met a new man, Ross English. Maria also adopted Benjy, the little boy she had regarded as her own, and she and Ben planned to raise him together. The 'baddies' all got their comeuppances. Derek was accidentally shot and killed by Ben; his accomplice Tess went to jail, as did Gregory Richards (Francesca's real killer). Tim Truman, who though not a villain spent most of the three years causing problems for Ben and Meg, was murdered by Derek. Virginia remained in a mental hospital of the criminally insane, while reformed Annie also got a happy ending, finding love with relatively new character Jude.

In a twist ending, Meg appeared to wake up in Kansas and realize that the entire three years in Sunset Beach had been a dream – and the characters from the show were actually her friends and family in Kansas (a reference to The Wizard of Oz). However, at the last minute, Meg woke up in Sunset Beach and was in bed with Ben, the day after their wedding. Probably the dream was poking fun at how many writers use the "it was all just a dream" ending to bring a story to a close, as was done in stories such as Alice's Adventures in Wonderland or more aptly, evoking the dream (9th) season of the prime-time soap, Dallas.

== Broadcast history ==
Upon its premiere, Sunset Beach was made part of NBC's daytime programming block; the show began airing on January 6, 1997. At first, the show was given a one-year deal, with 255 episodes to produce. NBC reclaimed the 12:00 pm hour from its affiliates in order to air the series in a more optimal timeslot, in exchange for giving them back the 10:00 am hour; in turn, the low-rated daytime newsmagazine Real Life with Jane Pauley (which occupied the earlier 10:00 timeslot) was cancelled to make room for Sunset Beach on the lineup.

Like all the other lower-rated daytime shows before it, however, not all of NBC's affiliates would air Sunset Beach at its scheduled time due to their continuous longstanding practice of airing local newscasts or other syndicated programming in that hour; this resulted in some NBC stations airing the show in a different spot on their schedule while others did not air it at all, often relegating it either to other network affiliates or independent stations in some media markets (especially in Detroit and Houston, where affiliates WDIV-TV and KPRC-TV, both owned by what was then Post-Newsweek Stations (now Graham Media Group), preempted it for its entire run; NBC arranged to have then-UPN stations WKBD-TV and KTXH air the series in their place). In the markets that did air Sunset Beach at its scheduled time, the show's first half-hour faced off against local newscasts from other network affiliates while its second half-hour went up against the first half-hour of The Young and the Restless on CBS and Port Charles on ABC.

In addition to its regular daytime airings, NBC ran same-day rebroadcasts of Sunset Beach as one of the initial offerings of the network's "NBC All Night" block, which premiered on September 21, 1998 as a replacement for the overnight newscast NBC Nightside. As such, it was the only soap opera ever to have aired as part of a network's late-night schedule (overnight soap opera broadcasts typically occur at the discretion of local affiliates in the event of preemptions caused by extended breaking news or severe weather coverage). Overnight repeats of Sunset Beach continued until the end of the show's run.

Through its short existence, Sunset Beach remained in the daytime Nielsen ratings basement, despite being renewed twice. During the Shockwave storyline, it received its best ratings and showed signs that it might move off the bottom. However, this spike proved to be brief and was not sustained. As a result of all this, NBC cancelled Sunset Beach on September 17, 1999 and aired its last episode on December 31 of that year. The show's cancellation marked the last time that NBC would feature three serials on its daytime schedule: before the series' debut, the long-running Days of Our Lives and Another World (the latter replaced by Passions in June 1999) were the only soaps on the network following the 1993 cancellation of Santa Barbara, while the remainder of its daytime lineup was filled solely by unscripted talk and lifestyle programs until Today was expanded to a third hour in September 2000.

To date, Sunset Beach is the last regularly scheduled NBC network program to air anywhere in the 12:00 pm hour; NBC returned the hour to its affiliates after the show ended its run. As of October 6, 2003, three days after Port Charles aired its last episode, the 12:00 pm hour is currently used by all network affiliates, especially those of NBC, for their midday local newscasts as well as other programing; the lone exception is CBS, which continues to air The Young and the Restless at 12:30 pm.

The show, however, gained a cult following in the UK, doing especially well in the ratings for Channel 5, with some universities holding Sunset Beach parties where students would go dressed as their favorite character. Channel 5 tried to save the show when its cancellation was announced, offering partially to fund it and trying to get other networks involved, as had happened previously with Baywatch, but NBC was not interested. It did buy NBC's other soap opera, Days of Our Lives, to air in Sunset Beach’s place, even running promos during the show's final week, but Days failed to catch on and Channel 5 dropped the show approximately a year later.

== International broadcasting ==
In Australia, Sunset Beach aired on Network 10 from 1998 to 2000 in an early morning time slot.

In Cyprus, Sunset Beach aired on Sigma TV.

In Bosnia and Herzegovina, Sunset Beach aired on Radio and Television of Bosnia and Herzegovina (520 episodes) and Mreža Plus (Season 3).

In Bulgaria, Sunset Beach aired on Nova weekdays in 2001–2004 (all episodes), and on CBS Drama since January 2015, however only season 1 and 2 were aired.

In Canada, Sunset Beach aired at 3:00PM on independent station CHCH-DT in Hamilton, Ontario; the show was broadcast the same day as NBC.

In Chile, Sunset Beach aired on Megavisión.

In Croatia, Sunset Beach aired on HRT 1 weekdays at 6.30pm from 1998 to 1999. Only the first 260 episodes aired.

In Denmark, Sunset Beach aired on TV3.

In Finland, Sunset Beach aired on Nelonen.

In France, Sunset Beach aired on TF1. from January 1998 to July 2001 (all episodes) in afternoon and on foxlife (season 1 in 2006).

In Germany, Sunset Beach aired on RTL from January 2, 1998, to January 8, 1999, where it was cancelled. Super RTL took over and aired the soap from September 1, 1999, to March 9, 2001, in a late primetime slot. Local channel BTV aired reruns from 2001 to 2003.

In Ghana, Sunset Beach aired on TV3 network

In Greece, Sunset Beach aired on Star Channel.

In Hungary, Sunset Beach aired on TV2 in 1998; however, only 355 episodes were broadcast.

In Indonesia, Sunset Beach aired on Indosiar. The TV series was dubbed into Indonesian.

In Ireland, Sunset Beach aired on TV3 weekdays at 2.30pm from 20 September 1998 to August 2001 – all 755 episodes aired. The final year of episodes replayed between August 2001 and August 2002. After the final episode, TV3 replaced Sunset Beach with Australian hospital drama All Saints.

In Kenya, Sunset Beach aired on Citizen TV on Monday to Friday between 6:00 PM to 7:00 PM.

In Macedonia (now North Macedonia), Sunset Beach aired on Macedonian Radio Television.

In New Zealand, Sunset Beach aired on Three from 1998 to 2000 (all episodes).

In Nigeria, Sunset Beach aired on Africa Independent Television, weekdays 9pm – 10pm, between 2003 and 2004.

In Norway, Sunset Beach aired on TV2 and were the first TV network to purchase the series outside of the United States, airing the complete series from 1997–2000.

In the Philippines, Sunset Beach aired on Studio 23.

In Poland, Sunset Beach aired on RTL 7 from September 1, 1997, to August 31, 2000 (all episodes). As from January 27, 2014, the show is airing again on CBS Drama. However, only the first two seasons were aired.

In Romania Sunset Beach aired on TVR1 at 7:00 PM all 755 episodes

In Russia, Sunset Beach initially aired on NTV from November 12, 1997 to March 2000, after that, the same first 518 episodes were repeated until mid-2001, 2 episodes a day, but due to the NTV crisis in mid-2001, further showings of the series were suspended. In October 2003-in September 2005 and in July 2006 – July 2008 the TNT TV channel repeated all the same series. The CBS Drama channel also showed, but only the First Season of the series twice from January 9, 2015, and in 2016, after which the license to broadcast the channel in Russia was revoked.

In Spain, Sunset Beach aired on Antena 3. The channel intended for the series to be their big Summer premiere and launched the series with a 2-hour pilot on a Sunday afternoon in the popular 3:30pm movie slot. Promoting the series as Baywatch meets Beverly Hills, 90210 with a lot of Santa Barbara (the latter having been a massive hit for the channel many years earlier and the only big American daytime soap to have aired in Spain), the series continued with its regular screenings every weeknight in the much coveted 8:00pm Access Primetime slot, the slot previously occupied by Baywatch. Sunset Beach, however, failed to attract any attention, and the series was promptly axed after one week and six episodes, never to return to Spanish TV again. The series resurfaced in September 1998 as part of Antena 3's first attempt at a morning program, Hoy, de mañana.

In Slovakia, Sunset Beach aired on TV Markíza; however, only 260 episodes were broadcast.

In Slovenia, Sunset Beach first aired on Pop TV and switched to Kanal A later in its run. All episodes aired.

In South Africa, Sunset Beach originally aired on SABC 3 for its entire run from 1999 to 2001 weekdays at 4:10pm. Due to its popularity, rival channel e.tv started rebroadcasting the entire series from September 2007 every weekday morning at 10:30am.

In Sweden, Sunset Beach aired on TV4. All episodes aired one time on TV4 between August 17, 1998, to 2000, and the rerun aired on TV4 and TV4 Plus. A second rerun started airing on TV4 in 2004 but was later cancelled.

In Trinidad & Tobago, Sunset Beach aired on CCN TV6 from 1997 to 2001 weekdays at 12:00pm with a rerun at 5:30pm. All episodes aired.

In Ukraine, Sunset Beach aired on 1+1.

In the United Kingdom, Sunset Beach aired on Channel 5 from 31 March 1997 to 1 March 2000 becoming only the second American daytime soap opera to air on a British terrestrial TV channel (the first being, coincidentally, Santa Barbara on ITV. Others ran only on satellite and cable channels). It became one of Channel 5s earliest successful imports, being part of its daytime launch schedule, so much so, when it ended in 1999, Channel 5 were a part of an international consortium who tried to invest in Sunset Beach to keep it being produced for its large international audience, but this bid failed, and it ended on this channel in 2000. There was then a bidding war for the repeat rights, and the first 130 episodes were repeated on ITV2, a digital channel, from 3 July 2000 to 5 January 2001 before the series was dropped due to low ratings and the high cost of broadcast rights. Channel 5 then started repeating the series again, starting in 2004, but dropped it from the daytime schedule due to low ratings. They continued repeats in double-bills in the early hours of Saturday and Sunday mornings until they had shown all the episodes they had bought the rights for (approx. 215).

In Venezuela Sunset Beach aired on Venezolana de Televisión.

In Zimbabwe, Sunset Beach aired on Joy TV.

== Home media ==
Sunset Beach was released on DVD on 22 July 2008 by the German company Koch Media. The first 12 episodes were released on four DVDs (in German and English).

DVD name	Year	Region 2 (German)	Additional features
Box 1	1997	July 22, 2008	None

== References and casting ==
=== Satire and pop culture references ===
It frequently referenced other television shows: many episodes featured characters fantasizing about their lives and dreams in sequences that show the cast dressed as Charlie's Angels or performing the opening from Friends.

Fantasies involving the character Annie Douglas Richards included take offs of Leeza and The Jerry Springer Show (titled "Murderer of the Day"), which guest-starred their respective hosts. Annie fantasized about being a superhero, had a play of the movie The Wizard of Oz, a play on Wheel of Fortune, and even her own imaginary soap opera titled The Search for Dignity. Plus, the character of Annie was usually the one to deliver funny quotes.

In his biography, the Italian fashion model Den Harrow says that in 1997 he moved to California to take part in the serial.

=== Stunt casting guest appearances ===
The show went in for stunt casting guest appearances – Jerry Springer played talk show host Jerry Feller and a census taker, Marla Maples played socialite Barbara Birch, Joseph Wapner played himself – and featured a ripped from the headline story about a Washington intern, Meg's sister Sara Cummings (Shawn Batten), who'd had an affair with a married politician. Her affair was exposed by her supposed friend – Melinda Fall (Elizabeth Alley), a take off on Linda Tripp. Sara went on to develop a relationship with local lifeguard Casey Mitchum, and their relationship and her sibling rivalry with her sister (who at one point started an affair with Casey) made up the bulk of Sara's storylines, although she was also famous for her TV show-inspired fantasy sequences, which included spoofs of the opening titles for Friends and The Mary Tyler Moore Show.

Other notable guest appearances include Finola Hughes as Cole's ex-fiancée Helena, Christopher Darden as Les Gordon, John O'Hurley as the host of Wheel of Misfortune, Kim Alexis as a hotel maid, Jack Wagner as a thief named Jacques Dumont, and Barbara Mandrell as Casey's ill mother Alex Mitchum.
