= Busses Roar =

1942 film by D. Ross Lederman

- Directed by: D. Ross Lederman
- Written by: George Bilson (screenplay); Anthony Coldeway (story and screenplay)
- Starring: Richard Travis; Julie Bishop; Charles Drake; Eleanor Parker
- Cinematography: James Van Trees
- Edited by: James Gibbon
- Music by: Howard Jackson; William Lava
- Distributed by: Warner Bros. Pictures
- Release date: August 18, 1942
- Running time: 58 minutes
- Country: United States
- Language: English

Busses Roar is a 1942 film directed by D. Ross Lederman and starring Richard Travis and Julie Bishop.

== Plot ==
A bungling saboteur attempts to place a bomb on board a bus so that it will explode as the bus passes by some oil wells. The plot is foiled, but not by the authorities.

== Cast ==
- Richard Travis as Sergeant Ryan
- Julie Bishop as Reba Richards
- Charles Drake as Eddie Sloan
- Eleanor Parker as Norma
- Elisabeth Fraser as Betty
- Richard Fraser as Dick Remick
- Peter Whitney as Frederick Hoff
- Frank Wilcox as Detective Quinn
- Willie Best as Sunshine
- Rex Williams as Jerry Silva
- Harry Lewis as Danny
- Bill Kennedy as The Moocher
- George Meeker as Nick Stoddard
- Vera Lewis as Mrs. Dipper
- Harry C. Bradley as Henry Dipper
- Lottie Williams as First Old Maid
- Leah Baird as Second Old Maid
- Chester Gan as Yamanito
- Henry Blair as Billy
