= Lying in Wait =

2000 film D. Shone Kirkpatrick

- Movie Poster
- Directed by: D. Shone Kirkpatrick
- Written by: D. Shone Kirkpatrick (Written By)
- Produced by: Daniel Grodnik; Robert Snukal
- Starring: Rutger Hauer; Virginia Madsen; Thomas Newton; Shannon Whirry; Vanessa Dorman; Ian Buchanan
- Cinematography: Don E. FauntLeRoy
- Edited by: Jonathan Cates
- Music by: Thomas Morse
- Production company: Itasca Pictures
- Release date: January 2, 2001; (Russia)
- Running time: 91 minutes
- Country: United States
- Language: English

Lying in Wait is a 2001 American direct-to-video, thriller film, starring Rutger Hauer, Virginia Madsen and Thomas Newton. It was written and directed by D. Shone Kirkpatrick.

== Plot ==
Babee Gordon (Thomas Newton) is a quiet, introverted bachelor who one day discovers he has new next-door neighbors, Keith and Vera Miller (Rutger Hauer and Virginia Madsen).

== Cast ==
- Rutger Hauer as Keith Miller
- Virginia Madsen as Vera Miller
- Thomas Newton as Babee Gordon
- Shannon Whirry as Lois
- Vanessa Dorman as El
- Ian Buchanan as George

== Reception ==
Film Totaal gave the film a 5,9 score.
