= Vanessa Dorman =

American actress

- Born: Vanessa Brit Dorman; February 27, 1969 (age 57); Los Angeles, California, U.S
- Years active: 1996–2010

Vanessa Dorman (born February 27, 1969) is an American actress, best known for her role as Caitlin Richards Deschanel in the NBC soap opera, Sunset Beach.

== Life and career ==
Dorman was born in Los Angeles, California. She grew up in Niantic, Connecticut, and later attended East Lyme High School and graduated in 1987.

Dorman has made her television debut on the ABC soap opera All My Children, before she was cast alongside Lesley-Anne Down and Sam Behrens as Caitlin Richards Deschanel in the NBC soap opera Sunset Beach, produced by Aaron Spelling. She portrayed the role from 9 January 1997 to 18 June 1998, when she hit contract problems and was let go. As of June 24, 1998, she was replaced by Kam Heskin, who portrayed the role until the end of the show 31 December 1999. She later went to guest-starring role on Silk Stalkings, Dawson's Creek, and Nash Bridges, and well as ABC miniseries The Beach Boys: An American Family.

== Filmography ==
| Year | Title | Role | Notes |
|---|---|---|---|
| 1996 | All My Children | Josie | Recurring role |
| 1997-1998 | Sunset Beach | Caitlin Richards Deschanel | Series regular |
| 1999 | Suits | Angelica | |
| 1999 | Silk Stalkings | Kimberly | Episode: "A Clockwork Florida Orange" |
| 1999 | Dawson's Creek | Belinda McGovern | Episodes: "Like a Virgin" and "Escape from Witch Island" |
| 2000 | The Beach Boys: An American Family | Amy | Miniseries |
| 2000 | Damned If You Do | Annette | Short film |
| 2000 | Nash Bridges | Bonnie | Episode: "The Messenger" |
| 2001 | Lying in Wait | Lying in Wait | |
| 2001 | Seven Days | Sarah Mitchell | Episode: "Kansas" |
| 2001 | Nash Bridges | Angie Stark | Episode: "Cat Fight" |
| 2001 | Dead Last | Sally Storkley | Episode: "Death Is in the Air" |
| 2003 | Party Animals | Vanessa | Short film |
| 2007 | Fighting Words | Shelly Lancaster | |
