= The Voice of the Turtle (film) =

1947 film by Irving Rapper

- Directed by: Irving Rapper
- Written by: John Van Druten; Charles Hoffman
- Based on: The Voice of the Turtle by John Van Druten
- Produced by: Charles Hoffman
- Starring: Ronald Reagan; Eleanor Parker; Eve Arden; Wayne Morris
- Cinematography: Sol Polito
- Edited by: Rudi Fehr
- Music by: Max Steiner
- Production company: Warner Bros. Pictures
- Distributed by: Warner Bros. Pictures
- Release date: December 25, 1947
- Running time: 103 minutes
- Country: United States
- Language: English
- Budget: $2,380,000
- Box office: $2,450,000 (US rentals) or $3,116,000

The Voice of the Turtle is a 1947 American romantic comedy film directed by Irving Rapper and starring Ronald Reagan, Eleanor Parker, Eve Arden and Wayne Morris. It was produced and distributed by Warner Bros. Pictures. It was based on the long-running 1943 stage play The Voice of the Turtle by John Van Druten. In the 1950s, the film was rereleased and aired on television under the title One for the Book.

== Plot ==
In December 1944 in New York City, naïve young actress Sally Middleton is jilted by her lover, a theatrical producer, for becoming too serious about their relationship. Although she vows to not allow herself to fall in love again, Sally agrees to a dinner date with Bill Page, an Army sergeant on a weekend pass who is rejected by Sally's friend, the sophisticated Olive Lashbrooke.

When Bill has trouble finding a hotel room, he spends the weekend at Sally's apartment. Although they sleep in separate rooms, the arrangement creates awkward situations for Sally, especially when she finds herself developing feelings for Bill.

Olive has second thoughts about Bill and makes romantic overtures. However, Bill has fallen for Sally and convinces her to overcome her fears and start a romance with him.

== Cast ==
- Ronald Reagan as Sgt. Bill Page
- Eleanor Parker as Sally Middleton
- Eve Arden as Olive Lashbrooke
- Wayne Morris as Cmdr. Ned Burling
- Kent Smith as Kenneth Bartlett
- John Emery as George Harrington
- Erskine Sanford as Storekeeper
- John Holland as Henry Atherton
- Douglas Kennedy as Naval Officer (uncredited)
- Nanette Bordeaux as French Girl (uncredited)

== Box office ==
According to Warner Bros. records, the film earned $2,617,000 domestically and $499,000 foreign.

== Reception ==
Many critics compared the film to the original play, which finished its Broadway run one week after the film's release. Time magazine complained that the film "is most coyly prurient where the play was most pleasantly candid" while The New York Times found the film version more satisfying because it was "morally wholesome and ideally romantic."
