= Chasen Parker =

American actor

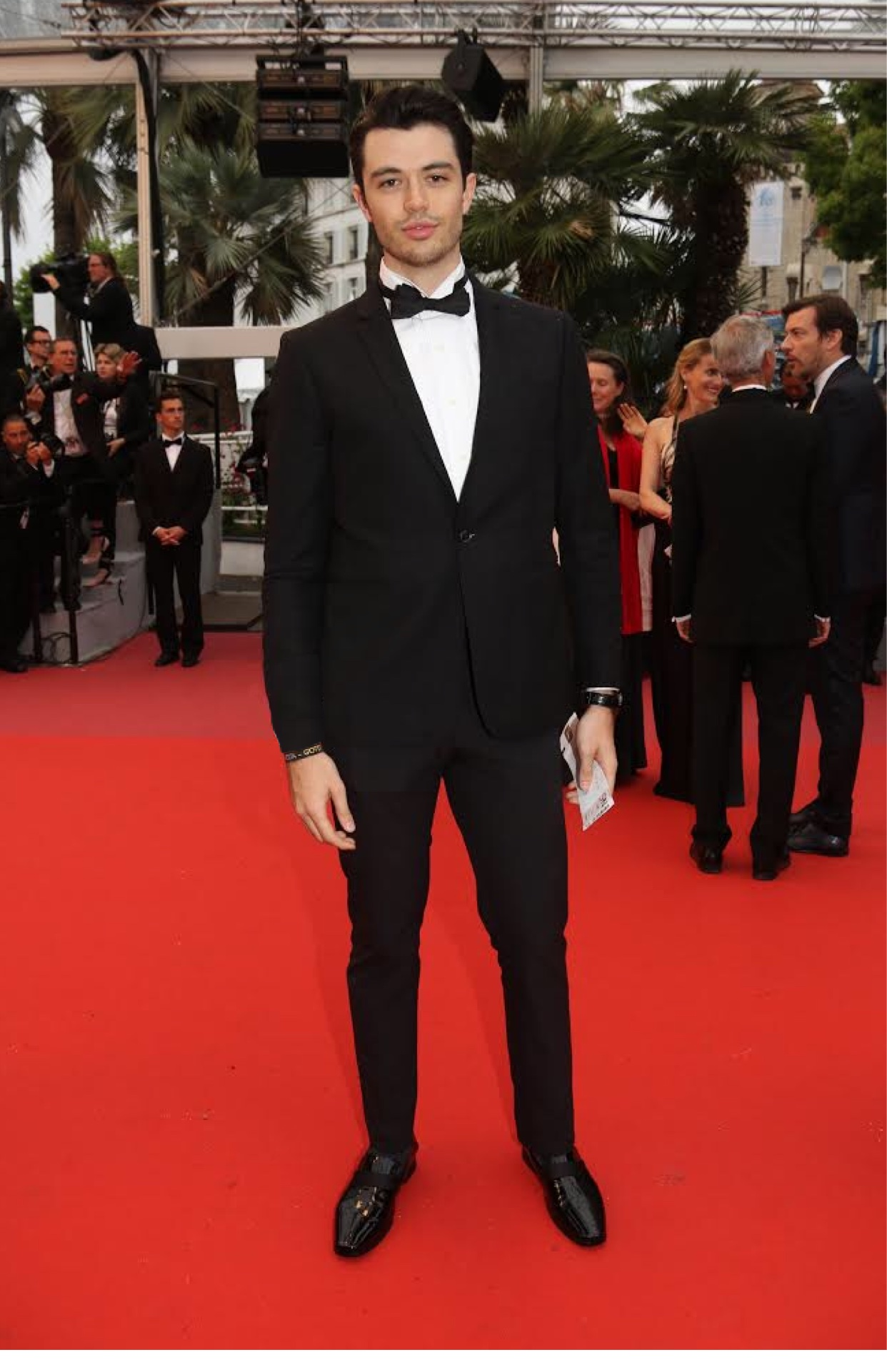
- Parker in 2018
- Born: Chasen Hunt Parker; April 22, 1994 (age 32); Burbank, California, U.S.
- Occupations: Actor; Producer; Writer; Director
- Years active: 1996–2004, 2017–present
- Relatives: Eleanor Parker (grandmother)

Chasen Parker (born April 22, 1994) is an American actor and filmmaker who was born in Burbank, California. He began working as an actor at the age of 2 on an Arby's national TV commercial. He worked as a series regular, starting at the age of 4, on Sunset Beach as Benjy Evans as well as appeared in General Hospital and 7th Heaven. Approaching his teen years, his family moved to Houston, Texas, and he attended theatre school at Sam Houston State University, then transferred to film school at Emerson College in Boston. Parker made many short films in which he acted, produced, wrote, and directed. He moved back to Los Angeles in 2018. He is the grandson of actress Eleanor Parker by way of Parker's son Rich.

== Film ==
In late 2020, Parker co-founded his production company Cardinal Trio Pictures with John C. Hall and Nick Scherma.

== Theater ==
Parker made his professional theater debut in Stages Repertory Theatre's production of We Are Proud to Present a Presentation About the Herero of Namibia, Formerly Known as South West Africa, from the German Sudwestafrika Between the Years 1884-1915 to critical acclaim. The Houston Chronicle called it "the best play of the year" and added "Parker somehow makes [his character] the most emotionally breakable of the troop even while playing a monster."

== Television ==
Parker first appeared in a TV series when he was age 4, joining Sunset Beach, the first daytime drama from executive producer Aaron Spelling, for five months in 1999.

- 1998 -General Hospital - young Nikolas Cassadine - soap opera, 1 episode
- 1999 - 7th Heaven - young Matt - episode In Praise of Women
- 1999 - Sunset Beach - Benjy Evans - soap opera, recurring role

Since turning adult, Parker has only appeared in short films; of his 13 short films as of 2025, six were self-produced.

== Other work ==
As a child, Parker appeared in TV commercials for Arby's, Kellogg's and Microsoft.
