= Russell Curry =

American actor

Russell Curry (born August 28, 1956 in Minneapolis, Minnesota) is an American actor. He played Carter Todd on Another World (1984-1986), Vic Boswell on Santa Barbara (1988-1992), David Grant on Guiding Light (1995-1996), Sam Lucas on Savannah (1997), and Tyus Robinson on Sunset Beach (1997-1999).

== Filmography ==
Year	Title	Role	Notes
Notes
1984	Murder, She Wrote: The Murder of Sherlock Holmes"	Black Youth	
1986	The Check Is in the Mail...	Burglar #2	
1988	Phantom of the Ritz	Marcus	
1990	Impulse	Bartender Mills	
1991	Queens Logic	Bouncer	
1991	Mobsters	Black Gangster	
1993	Falling Down	Second Officer's Partner	
1994	The WormKillers' Last Spring	Mr. Senior Executive	
2001	What's the Worst That Could Happen?	Reporter #1	
2002	Cruel Game	Bartender	
2018	Future World	Guerilla 1	
1985	The Cosby Show	Thad	Episode "Clair's Sister"
