= Eleanor Parker =

American actress (1922–2013)

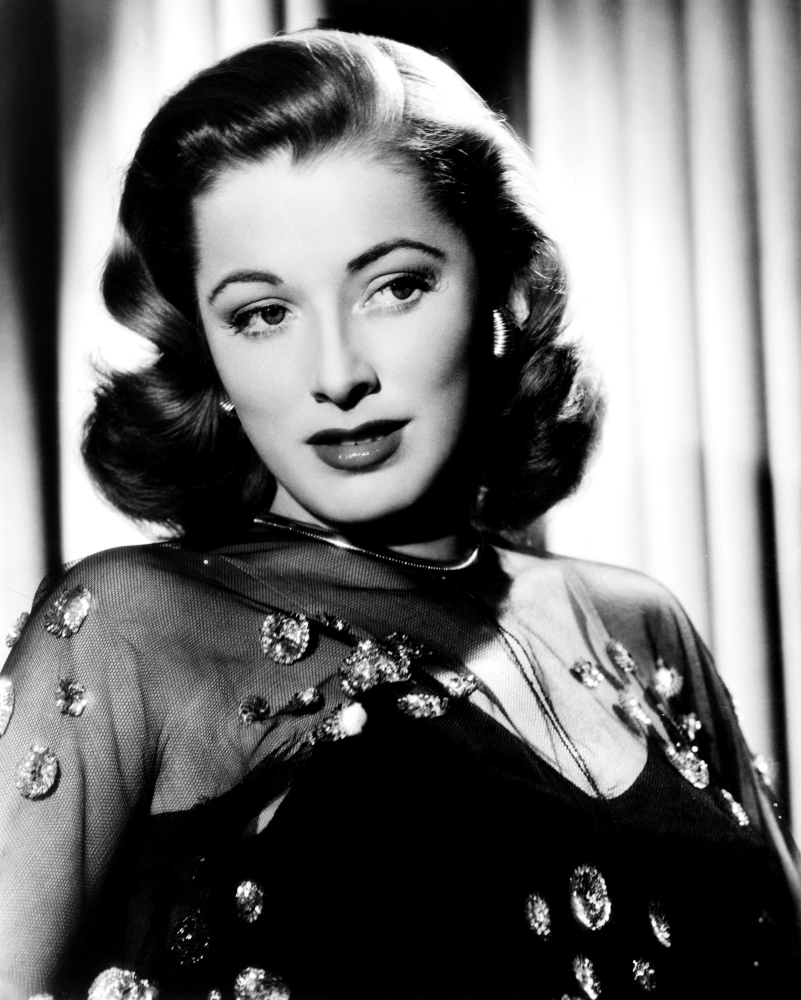
- Parker in the 1940s
- Born: Eleanor Jean Parker; June 26, 1922; Cedarville, Ohio, U.S.
- Died: December 9, 2013 (aged 91); Palm Springs, California, U.S.
- Education: Shaw High School; Pasadena Playhouse
- Occupation: Actress
- Years active: 1941–1991
- Known for: Caged; Detective Story; Interrupted Melody; The Sound of Music; Scaramouche
- Spouses: Fred Losee (m. 1943; div. 1944) Bert E. Friedlob (m. 1946; div. 1953) Paul Clemens (m. 1954; div. 1965) Raymond N. Hirsch (m. 1966; died 2001)
- Children: 4
- Relatives: Chasen Parker (grandson)

Eleanor Jean Parker (June 26, 1922 – December 9, 2013) was an American actress. She was nominated for three Academy Awards, one each for her roles in the films Caged (1950), Detective Story (1951), and Interrupted Melody (1955), the first of which won her the Volpi Cup for Best Actress. She was also known for her roles in the films Of Human Bondage (1946), Scaramouche (1952), The Naked Jungle (1954), The Man with the Golden Arm (1955), A Hole in the Head (1959), The Sound of Music (1965), and The Oscar (1966).

== Early life ==
Eleanor Jean Parker was born on June 26, 1922, in Cedarville, Ohio, the daughter of Lola (née Isett) and Lester Day Parker. She moved with her family to East Cleveland, Ohio, where she attended public schools and graduated from Shaw High School. "Ever since I can remember, all I wanted to do is act", she said. "But I didn't just dream about it. I worked at it."

She appeared in a number of school plays. After graduation, she went to Martha's Vineyard to work on her acting. She got a job as a waitress and was offered a screen test by 20th Century Fox, but turned it down. Wanting to focus on films, she moved to California and started appearing at the Pasadena Playhouse.

== Career ==
=== Warner Bros ===
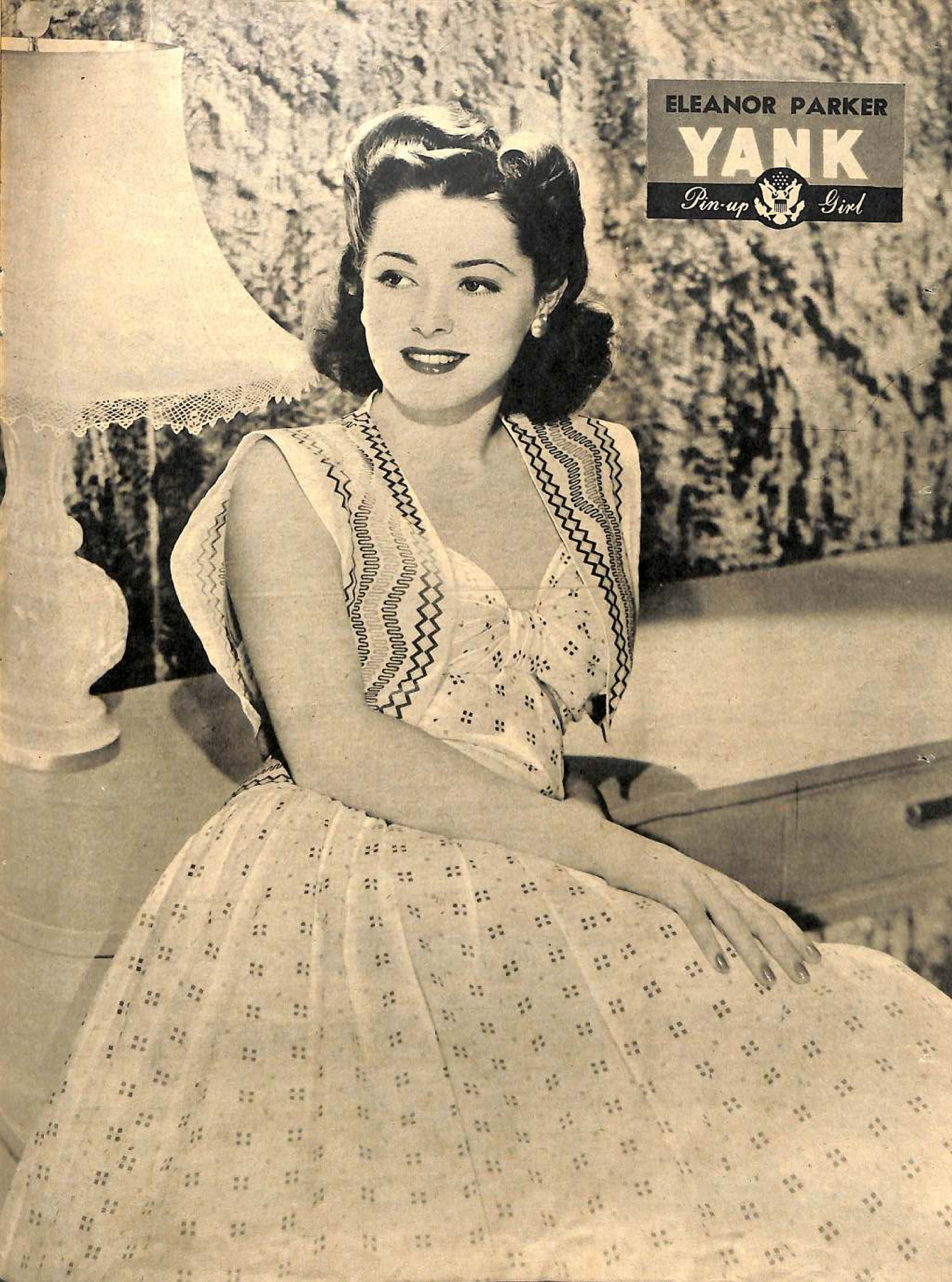
Parker featured in WW2 publication, Yank, the Army Weekly, (1943)

She was in the audience one night at Pasadena Playhouse when spotted by a Warners Bros talent scout, Irving Kumin. He offered her a test, and she accepted. The studio signed her to a long-term contract in June 1941.

She was cast that year in the film They Died with Their Boots On, but her scenes were deleted. Her actual film debut was as Nurse Ryan in the short film Soldiers in White in 1942.

She was given some decent roles in the B films Busses Roar (1942) and The Mysterious Doctor (1943), and she had a small role in Mission to Moscow (1943). This performance impressed Warners, so when Joan Leslie was held up on Rhapsody in Blue, Parker replaced her in Between Two Worlds (1944), playing the wife of Paul Henreid's character.

She stayed in supporting roles for Crime by Night (1944) and The Last Ride (1944), then was given the starring role with Dennis Morgan in The Very Thought of You (1944), replacing Ida Lupino. She was given a cameo in Hollywood Canteen (1944). Warners gave her the choice role of Mildred Rogers in a new version of Somerset Maugham's Of Human Bondage (1946). Although director Edmund Goulding called Parker one of the five greatest actresses in America, previews were not favorable, and the film sat on the shelf for two years before being released to an underwhelming reception. However, in 1953, Parker called it her favorite role.

Parker later said the "big break" of her career was when she was cast with John Garfield in Pride of the Marines (1945). "It was a great part, and who wouldn't look good with John Garfield", she later said. "He was absolutely wonderful." However, two films that followed with Errol Flynn, the romantic comedy Never Say Goodbye (1946) and the drama Escape Me Never (1947), were box-office disappointments.

Parker was suspended twice by Warners for refusing parts in films – in Stallion Road (where she was replaced by Alexis Smith) and Love and Learn.

She made the comedy Voice of the Turtle (1947, aired today under the title One for the Book) with Ronald Reagan and was in an adaptation of The Woman in White (1948). She refused to appear in Somewhere in the City (1948) so Warners suspended her again; Virginia Mayo played the role.

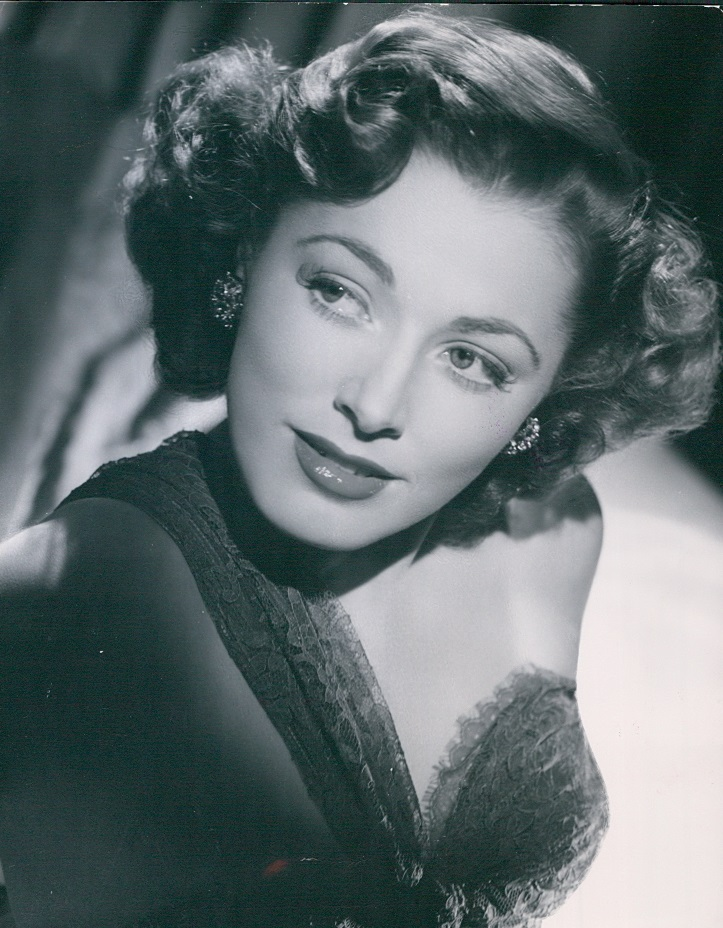
Parker in 1948

Parker then had two years off, and during this time, she married and had a baby. She turned down a role in The Hasty Heart (1949), which she wanted to do, but it would have meant going to England, and she did not want to leave her baby alone during its first year. "I probably received my salary for only six months during 1947 and 1948, but I can't regret that", she said. "All my life, I wanted a child, and anything that might happen to me professionally on that account would hardly seem a loss."

She returned in Chain Lightning with Humphrey Bogart. "I've had my fling at roles that have little or no relation to most people's lives", she said in a 1949 interview. "I want to keep away from such assignments, as I can from now on, even though, as some may say, they mean exercising your skill and talent in acting."

Parker heard about Caged (1950), a film Warners was making of a woman in prison, and she lobbied the role. She got it, and won the 1950 Volpi Cup for Best Actress at the Venice Film Festival and was nominated for an Academy Award. She also had a good role in the melodrama Three Secrets (1950).

In February 1950, Parker left Warner Bros. after having been under contract there for eight years. Parker had understood that she would star in a film called Safe Harbor, but Warner Bros. apparently had no intention of making it. Because of this misunderstanding, her agents negotiated her release.

=== Paramount ===
Parker's career outside of Warners started badly with Valentino (1951), where she played a fictionalized wife of Rudolph Valentino, and then she tried the comedy A Millionaire for Christy (1951) (originally called The Golden Goose).

In 1951, Parker signed a contract with Paramount for one film per year, with an option for outside films. This arrangement began brilliantly with Detective Story (1951) for director William Wyler, playing Mary McLeod, the woman who doesn't understand the position of her unstable detective husband (played by Kirk Douglas); Parker was nominated for the leading actress Oscar in 1951 for her performance, which, to date, remains the shortest performance to be nominated in the category.

=== MGM ===
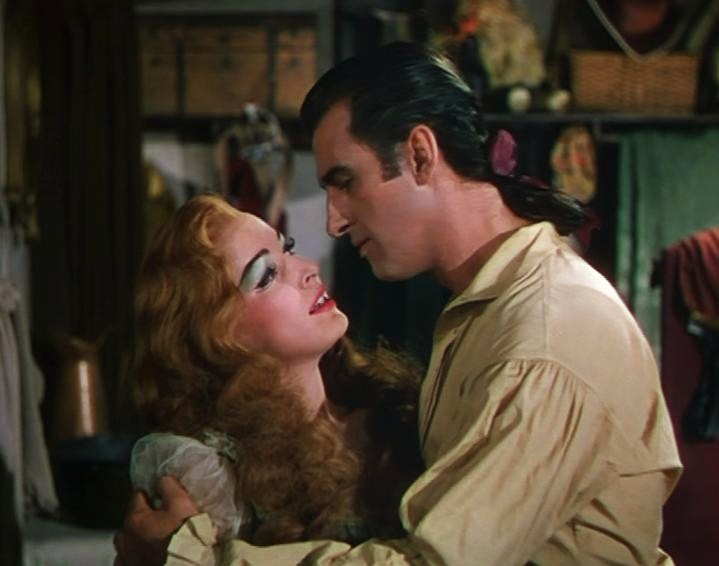
Parker with Stewart Granger in Scaramouche (1952)

Parker followed Detective Story with her portrayal of an actress in love with a swashbuckling nobleman (played by Stewart Granger) in Scaramouche (1952), a role originally intended for Ava Gardner. Parker later claimed that Granger was the only person she didn't get along with during her entire career. However, they had good chemistry, and the film was a massive hit. MGM rushed her into Above and Beyond (1952), a biopic of Lt. Col. Paul W. Tibbets, Jr. (Robert Taylor), the pilot of the aircraft that dropped the atomic bomb on Hiroshima. It was a solid hit. While Parker was making Escape from Fort Bravo (1953), she signed a five-year contract with MGM.

She was named as star of My Most Intimate Friend and of One More Time, from a script by Ruth Gordon and Garson Kanin, but neither film was made. Back at Paramount, Parker starred with Charlton Heston as a 1901 mail-order bride in The Naked Jungle (1954), directed by Byron Haskin and produced by George Pal.

Parker returned to MGM where she was reunited with Robert Taylor in Valley of the Kings (1954) and the Western Many Rivers to Cross (1955).

"I maintain that if you work, believe in yourself, and do what is right for you without stepping all over others, the way somehow opens up", she said in 1953. "By that, I don't mean just sitting back. At Warners, they still have a mile-long list of my suspensions for refusing certain parts. Anyway, I never did a Western. Not once. It's paid off too."

In a 1954 interview, she said her favorite films were Caged and Detective Story and her least favorite were Chain Lightning, Escape Me Never, Valentino, and The Woman in White. She had commitments to make two films per year at MGM and one per year at Paramount. "Personally, I prefer to be under contract", she said.

MGM gave her one of her better roles as opera singer Marjorie Lawrence in Interrupted Melody (1955). It was a big hit and earned Parker a third Oscar nomination; she later said it was her favorite film.

Also in 1955, Parker appeared in the film adaptation of the National Book Award-winner The Man with the Golden Arm (1955), directed by Otto Preminger and released through United Artists. She played Zosh, a woman in a wheelchair and the wife of heroin-addicted would-be jazz drummer Frankie Machine (Frank Sinatra). It was a major commercial and critical success.

In 1956, she was billed above the title with Clark Gable for the comedy The King and Four Queens, also for United Artists.

It was then back to MGM for two movies, both dramas: Lizzie (1957), in the title role, as a woman with a split personality, and The Seventh Sin (1957), a remake of The Painted Veil. Both films flopped at the box office, and as a result, Parker's plans to produce L'Eternelle, about French resistance fighters, did not materialize.

=== Later films, and transition into television and theatre ===
Parker supported Frank Sinatra in the popular comedy A Hole in the Head (1959). She returned to MGM for Home from the Hill (1960), co-starring with Robert Mitchum, then took over Lana Turner's role of Constance Rossi in Return to Peyton Place, a 1961 sequel to the hit 1957 film. It was made by 20th Century Fox which produced Madison Avenue (1961) with Parker.

In 1960, she made her TV debut. "I look for the quality story and for parts that I think will be good or fun. People told me I was crazy to do Hole in the Head and Home from the Hill, but both those pictures appealed to me. I did enough of the bad ones (films), while I was under contract – because I was being told to do them. That's the problem with being under contract. You do the pictures, or be suspended. Now, I don't want to work unless I have faith in the part. This has nothing to do with wanting to be famous, or anything like that. It's just that I love acting."

In the early 1960s, she worked increasingly in television, with the occasional film role such as Panic Button (1964).

Parker's best-known screen role was playing Baroness Elsa von Schraeder in the 1965 Oscar-winning musical The Sound of Music.

In 1966, she played an alcoholic widow in the crime drama Warning Shot, a talent scout who discovers a Hollywood star in The Oscar, and a rich alcoholic in An American Dream. From the late 1960s, she focused on television roles.

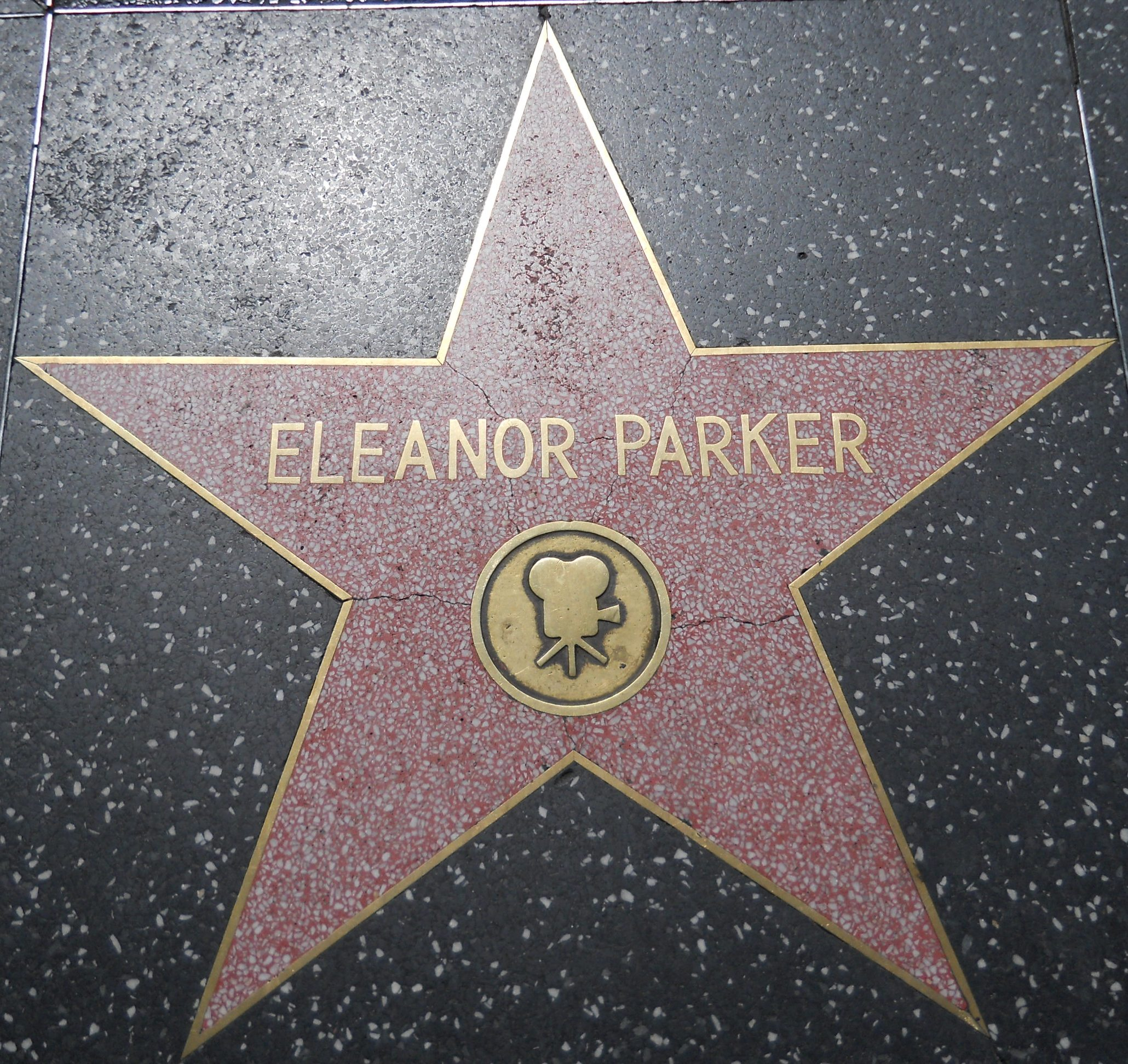
Star on the Hollywood Walk of Fame at 6340 Hollywood Blvd.

In 1963, Parker appeared in the medical drama The Eleventh Hour in the episode "Why Am I Grown So Cold?", for which she was nominated for an Emmy Award as Outstanding Single Performance by an Actress in a Leading Role. In 1964, she appeared in the episode "A Land More Cruel" on Breaking Point. In 1968, she portrayed a spy in How to Steal the World, a film originally shown as the two-part concluding episodes of The Man from U.N.C.L.E..

Parker starred with Michael Sarrazin and Gayle Hunnicutt in her final theatrical film of the 1960s, the tense thriller Eye of The Cat (1969), which was written by Joseph Stefano.

In 1969–1970, Parker starred in the television series Bracken's World, for which she was nominated for a 1970 Golden Globe Award as Best TV Actress – Drama. "I wanted to do the series so I could stay put", she said. "Every movie I'm offered is shot in Europe or Asia or somewhere. I'm tired of running around." Parker left the series after the first 16 episodes, citing the limited nature of her role.

After 1969, she worked steadily, but except for a small role in Sunburn (1979), her screen acting was on television. Parker appeared in the NBC series Ghost Story episode "Half a Death" (1972). Parker appeared in the TV movie Maybe I'll Come Home in the Spring (1971) and on TV in Home for the Holidays (1972). She starred in other TV movies and made guest appearances on series such as Hawaii Five-O, The Love Boat, Hotel, and Murder, She Wrote. Her final TV role was in the 1991 TV movie Dead on the Money.

Concurrent with her TV career, Parker starred in a number of theatrical productions, including the role of Margo Channing in Applause, the Broadway musical version of the film All About Eve. The role originally was played in the musical by Lauren Bacall. In 1976, she played Maxine in the Ahmanson Theatre revival of The Night of the Iguana. She was replaced in the Circle in the Square Theatre revival of Pal Joey during previews.

For her contributions to the movie industry, Parker was honored with a star on the Hollywood Walk of Fame at 6340 Hollywood Boulevard.

== Personal life ==
Parker was married four times:

- Fred Losee—married in April 1943, divorced in December 1944.
- Bert E. Friedlob—married in 1946, divorced in 1953; the marriage produced three children.
- Paul Clemens, American portrait painter—married in 1954, divorced in 1965; the marriage produced one child, actor Paul Clemens.
- Raymond N. Hirsch—married in 1966, widowed on September 14, 2001, when Hirsch died of esophageal cancer.

She was the grandmother of actor Chasen Parker.

Parker was raised a Protestant, and later converted to Messianic Judaism, a form of Christianity which takes on some Jewish characteristics, telling the New York Daily News columnist Kay Gardella in August 1969: "I think we're all Jews at heart...I wanted to convert for a long time." She embraced and was a supporter of Messianic Jewish philosopher, teacher, and commentator Roy Masters, owner of the Foundation of Human Understanding in Grants Pass, Oregon. In 1978, she wrote the foreword to Masters's book How Your Mind Can Keep You Well.,

== Death ==
Eleanor Parker died on December 9, 2013, at a medical facility in Palm Springs, California, from complications of pneumonia. She was 91.

== Filmography ==
=== Film and television ===
Year	Title	Role	Notes
1941	They Died with Their Boots On	bit part	scenes deleted
1942	The Big Shot	Telephone Operator	voice, uncredited
1942	Busses Roar	Norma	
1942	Soldiers in White	Nurse Ryan	short subject
1942	Men of the Sky	Mrs. Frank Bickley	short subject
1942	Vaudeville Days	Colleen	uncredited short subject
1943	The Mysterious Doctor	Letty Carstairs	
1943	Mission to Moscow	Emlen Davies	
1943	Destination Tokyo	Mike's Wife on Record	voice, uncredited
1944	Between Two Worlds	Ann Bergner	
1944	Atlantic City	Bathing Beauty	uncredited
1944	Crime by Night	Irene Carr	
1944	The Last Ride	Kitty Kelly	
1944	The Very Thought of You	Janet Wheeler	
1944	Hollywood Canteen	herself	cameo
1945	Pride of the Marines	Ruth Hartley	
1946	Of Human Bondage	Mildred Rogers	
1946	Never Say Goodbye	Ellen Gayley	
1947	Escape Me Never	Fenella MacLean	
1947	Always Together	herself	cameo, uncredited
1947	The Voice of the Turtle	Sally Middleton	
1948	The Woman in White	Laurie Fairlie; Ann Catherick	
1949	It's a Great Feeling	herself	cameo, uncredited
1950	Chain Lightning	Joan "Jo" Holloway	
1950	Caged	Marie Allen	
1950	Three Secrets	Susan Adele Connors Chase	
1951	Valentino	Joan Carlisle; Sarah Gray	
1951	A Millionaire for Christy	Christabel "Christy" Sloane	
1951	Detective Story	Mary McLeod	
1952	Scaramouche	Lenore	
1952	Above and Beyond	Lucey Tibbets	
1953	Escape from Fort Bravo	Carla Forester	
1954	The Naked Jungle	Joanna Leiningen	
1954	Valley of the Kings	Ann Barclay Mercedes	
1955	Many Rivers to Cross	Mary Stuart Cherne	
1955	Interrupted Melody	Marjorie Lawrence	
1955	The Man with the Golden Arm	Zosh Machine	
1956	The King and Four Queens	Sabina McDade	
1957	Lizzie	Elizabeth; Lizzie; Beth Richmond	
1957	The Seventh Sin	Carol Carwin	
1959	A Hole in the Head	Eloise Rogers	
1960	Home from the Hill	Hannah Hunnicutt	
1960	The Gambler, the Nun, and the Radio	Sister Cecelia	
1961	Return to Peyton Place	Connie Rossi	
1961	Madison Avenue	Anne Tremaine	
1962	Checkmate	Marion Bannion; Gussie Hill	episode: "The Renaissance of Gussie Hill"
1963	The Eleventh Hour	Connie Folsom	episode: "Why Am I Grown So Cold?"
1963	Bob Hope Presents the Chrysler Theatre	Fern Selman	episode: "Seven Miles of Bad Road"
1964	Panic Button	Louise Harris	
1964	Kraft Suspense Theatre	Dorian Smith	episode: "Knight's Gambit"
1965	The Sound of Music	The Baroness Elsa Schraeder	
1965	Convoy	Kate Fowler	episode: "Lady on the Rock"
1966	The Oscar	Sophie Cantaro	
1966	An American Dream	Deborah Kelly Rojack	
1967	Warning Shot	Mrs. Doris Ruston	
1967	The Tiger and the Pussycat	Esperia Vincenzini	
1968	The Man from U.N.C.L.E.	Margitta Kingsley	episode: "The Seven Wonders of the World Affair"; released in cinemas as How to Steal the World
1969	Eye of the Cat	Aunt Danny	
1969	Hans Brinker	Dame Brinker	
1969	Bracken's World	Sylvia Caldwell	episodes 1–16
1971	Maybe I'll Come Home in the Spring	Claire Miller	TV movie
1971	Vanished	Sue Greer	TV movie
1972	Circle of Fear	Paula Burgess	episode: "Half a Death"
1972	Home for the Holidays	Alex Morgan	TV movie
1973	The Great American Beauty Contest	Peggy Lowery	TV movie
1975	Guess Who's Coming to Dinner	Christine Drayton	TV pilot
1978	Hawaii Five-O	Mrs. Kincaid	episode: "The Big Aloha"
1978	The Bastard	Lady Amberly	TV movie
1979	Sunburn	Mrs. Thoren	
1979	She's Dressed to Kill	Regine Danton	TV movie
1980	Once Upon a Spy	The Lady	TV movie
1980	Vega$	Laurie Bishop	episode: "A Deadly Victim"
1981	Madame X	Katherine Richardson	TV movie
1979–1982	The Love Boat	Rosie Strickland; Alicia Bradbury	episode: "A Dress to Remember" episode: "Buddy and Portia's Story/Julie's Story/Carol and Doug's Story/Peter and Alicia's Story"
1977–1983	Fantasy Island	Peggy Atwood; Eunice Hollander Baines	episode: "Nurses Night Out" episode: "Yesterday's Love/Fountain of Youth" episode: "Pilot"
1983	Hotel	Leslie	episode: "The Offer"
1984	Finder of Lost Loves	Nora Spencer	episode: "The Gift"
1986	Murder, She Wrote	Maggie Tarrow	episode: "Stage Struck"
1991	Dead on the Money	Catherine Blake	TV movie

=== Theatre credits ===
- Applause (1972)
- The Night of the Iguana (1976) – Ahmanson Theatre
- Pal Joey (1976) – replaced during previews

=== Radio appearances ===
Year	Program	Episode/source
1954	Lux Radio Theatre	Detective Story

== Awards and nominations ==
Institution	Category	Year	Work	Result
Academy Awards	Best Actress	1951	Caged	Nominated
Academy Awards	Best Actress	1952	Detective Story	Nominated
Academy Awards	Best Actress	1956	Interrupted Melody	Nominated
Golden Globe Awards	Best TV Actress – Drama	1970	Bracken's World	Nominated
Primetime Emmy Awards	Outstanding Single Performance by an Actress in a Leading Role	1963	The Eleventh Hour	Nominated
Laurel Awards	Top Female Star	1958	—N/a	Nominated
Laurel Awards	Top Female Star	1959	—N/a	Nominated
Laurel Awards	Top Female Star	1960	—N/a	Nominated
Venice Film Festival	Volpi Cup for Best Actress	1950	Caged	Won

== Bibliography ==
- McClelland, Doug (1989). Eleanor Parker: Woman of a Thousand Faces. Metuchen, NJ: Scarecrow Press. ISBN 978-0-8108-2242-9.
