= V. P. Oliver =

American actor (born 1985)

V. P. Oliver (born October 8, 1985 in Northridge, California, United States as Vince Oliver) is an American actor. He played Jimmy Harrison in Aaron Spelling's soap opera Sunset Beach for 46 episodes in 1997.

Later, Oliver played college basketball at UC Davis, from 2005 to 2009. He scored over 1500 points in his 4-year career.
