= List of General Hospital characters =

This is a list of characters that have appeared or been mentioned on the American ABC soap opera General Hospital.

== A ==
=== Aaron ===
(Chad Brannon, 2009)

Aaron was a passenger on a flight leaving Port Charles. He sat next to Rebecca Shaw, who was the twin sister of Zander's late love, Emily Quartermaine. His appearance allowed Rebecca to leave town with a man who looked exactly like the man her twin had loved, providing a symbolic closure for the actors and the audience. Aaron had no biological or historical connection to Zander; he was simply a look-alike encountered by chance.

=== Abigail ===
(Ivy Bethune, 1987)

Also referred to as Abbie, Abigail was a minor character who appeared primarily in scenes involving the hospital staff or community members during the late 1980s.

=== Sarah Abbott ===
(Eileen Dietz, 1981–83)

Roommate to Heather Webber in the Forest Hill Sanitarium. Keeps all of Heather's secrets when Heather is escaping the sanitarium to kill Diana Taylor. Heather's gun is secretly hidden in a doll, kept closely in Sarah's hands. Sarah is convinced that she drowned her sister, a fact found to not be true. She falls in love with Joe Kelly who was investigating the murder. Used by Heather during her stay at Forest Hill, Sarah eventually wised up to her after recovering and left town after telling her that she was onto her.

=== Benny Abrahms (deceased) ===
(Richard Fancy, 1997–2003)

Corinthos and Morgan's original financial advisor, identical twin brother of Bernie. Dies after suffering a heart attack.

=== Bernie Abrahms (deceased) ===
(Richard Fancy, 2006–12)

The Jewish financier for Corinthos and Morgan and Benny's identical twin brother. Born Bernard K. Abrahms in 1943, a widower and uncle of Conan. He funds Sam McCall and Damian Spinelli's private eye agency. Shot in 2011, and blackmailed by Cesar Faison, posing as Duke Lavery. Dies during a shootout, after being shot by Joe Scully Jr. and Faison.

=== Rachel Adair (deceased) ===
(Amy Grabow, 2005)

Works with lover A. J. Quartermaine to frame Courtney Matthews for his supposed murder. Dates Steven Lars Webber. Killed by Asher Thomas after being injected with digitalis.

=== Tracy Adams ===
(Kim Hamilton, 1968–69)

An African-American kidney specialist, advocated for by Dr Steve Hardy.

=== Dr. Addison ===
(Richard Guthrie, 1989)

A doctor who competes for the assistant chief of staff position, which at the time was previously held by Dr. Monica Quartermaine.

=== Louise Addison ===
(Cara Pifko, 2009)

Assistant district attorney appointed to office in 2009. Best friends with Lisa Niles.

=== Sister Agatha ===
(Fran Ryan, 1989)

Head of the orphanage where Monica's illegitimate daughter, Dawn Winthrop was raised.

=== Albert ===
(William Beckley, 1981)

Helena Cassadine's butler.

=== Diego Alcazar (deceased) ===
(Ignacio Serricchio, 2004–06, 2008)

Son of Maria Sanchez and Lorenzo Alcazar, raised thinking Maria is his sister to hide him from his father. Thought to have been shot to death by Sam McCall in self defense, but resurfaces in February 2008 as the Text Message Killer. Died when he hanged himself accidentally.

=== Lila Rae Alcazar ===
(Gianna Maria Crane, 2006–07)
(Kayla Madison, 2012)

Daughter of Lorenzo Alcazar and Skye Chandler Quartermaine. Adoptive member of the Quartermaine family, named after her adoptive great-grandmother Lila Quartermaine, and her grandmother Rae Cummings. Lives in London, England with Skye and Rae.

=== Lorenzo Alcazar (deceased) ===
(Ted King, 2003–07)
(Jay Pickett, temp. 2006)

Brother of Luis Alcazar; father of Diego Alcazar and Lila Rae Alcazar. Comes to Port Charles to seek revenge for his brother's death, and remains always at war with Sonny Corinthos. Ex-husband of Carly Corinthos. 99% was killed by Jason Morgan.

=== Luis Alcazar (deceased) ===
(Ted King, 2002)

Brother of Lorenzo Alcazar and father of Sage Alcazar. Holds Brenda Barrett captive for four years, leading everyone to believe she is dead. Responsible for the death of Kristina Cassadine, in an attempt to kill Sonny Corinthos. Killed in self-defense by Alexis Davis after being pushed off his balcony in 2002.

=== Sage Alcazar (deceased) ===
(Eileen Boylan, 2003; Katie Stuart, 2003–04)

Daughter of Luis Alcazar, niece of Lorenzo Alcazar. Killed by Mary Bishop at the Quartermaine mansion.

=== Alfred ===
(Jack Donner, 2006–10)

Butler of Prince Nikolas Cassadine. Poisoned and almost killed by Colleen McHenry. A kind and quiet man.

=== Ali (deceased) ===
(Maitland McConnell, 2010–11)

Friend of Kristina Davis and has a crush on Michael Corinthos III. Dies from injuries after a bus accident.

=== Cynthia Allison ===
(Carolyn Craig, 1963)

Part of the original cast, Cynthia has an affair with Dr. Phil Brewer, causing marital problems between him and his wife Jessie Brewer. When Phil goes back to Jessie, Cynthia marries Dr. Ken Martin.

=== Karen Anderson ===
see: Betsy Frank

=== Ruby Anderson (deceased) ===
(Norma Connolly, 1979–98)

Aunt to Luke Spencer and Bobbie Spencer. Former madam; longtime manager of Kelly's Diner and at one time, a cleaning woman at both General Hospital and the Webber residence. A mentor to many young residents whom she rented rooms to at Kelly's. Dies in her sleep in 1999, leaving Kelly's to Bobbie and Luke.

=== Owen Anderson ===
(Luke Massy; 2020)

Sam's new parole officer.

=== Grant Andrews ===
(Brian Patrick Clarke, 1983–85)

Former Russian spy named Andre Chermin; assumes the alias Grant Putnam. Briefly marries Celia Quartermaine.

=== Dimitra Antoinelli ===
(Linda Cristal, 1988)

Mother of Dino Antoinelli. Mistress of Victor Jerome. Sent to prison along with her son for trying to kill Victor's daughter, Olivia.

=== Dino Antoinelli ===
(Chris DeRose, 1988)

Son of Victor Jerome with Dimitra Antoinelli. Half-brother to Julian Jerome, Olivia St. John, Evan Jerome Sr., and Ava Jerome. Tried to kill his sister Olivia and later sent to prison along with his mother.

=== Andy Archer (deceased) ===
(Ron Melendez, 2007–09)

Anesthesiologist at General Hospital, addicted to sleeping gas. Briefly gets involved with Kelly Lee. The first victim of a biotoxin accidentally released in the hospital.

=== Henry Archer (deceased) ===
(mentioned character)

Sam McCall's husband when under a fake name used to run a con to take the mark's money.

=== Shiloh Archer (deceased) ===
(Coby Ryan McLaughlin, 2018–19)

Son of Henry Archer. Born David Henry "Hank" Archer. Leader of Dawn of Day cult. Participated in the kidnapping of Drew Cain from Afghanistan. Father of Wiley-Cooper Jones. Killed by Sam McCall.

=== Venus "V" Ardanowski ===
(Lisa Cerasoli, 1997–99)

Former police officer, secretary to Jasper Jacks, and music executive at L&B Records. leaves Port Charles with Simon Prentiss, a gambler she meets in Monte Carlo.

=== David Arnett (deceased) ===
(Mentioned character, 1976)

Psychiatrist at General Hospital, married to Terri Webber. Dies in the Vietnam War.

=== Terri Webber Arnett ===
(Bobbi Jordan, 1976–77)

Sister to Jeff Webber and Rick Webber. Widow of David Arnett. Has a brief fling with Dr. Mark Dante.

=== Curtis Ashford ===
(Donnell Turner, 2015–)

Son of Marshall Ashford. Brother of Thomas "Tommy" Ashford. Uncle of TJ Ashford. Ex-police officer who now owns a nightclub called The Savoy. Came to town under the alias Curtis Gooden. Ex-husband of Jordan Ashford. Currently estranged and has broken up with new wife Dr. Portia Robinson.

=== Jordan Ashford ===
(Vinessa Antoine, 2014–18)
(Briana Nicole Henry, 2018–21)
(Tiffany Daniels, 2021)
(Tanisha Harper, 2022–)

Mother of TJ Ashford. Widow of Thomas "Tommy" Ashford Sr. Ex-wife of Curtis Ashford. Former agent with the DEA. Former police commissioner of Port Charles. Leaves town to get treatment for her dialysis after almost being poisoned by Peter August. Came back in March after completing treatment and took back her job as commissioner. Became the Deputy Mayor of Port Charles after the deaths of Eileen Ashby and Victor Cassadine.

=== TJ Ashford ===
(Krys Meyer, 2012)
(Tequan Richmond, 2012–18)
(Tahj Bellow, 2018–)

Son of Shawn Butler and Jordan Ashford; legal son of Thomas "Tommy" Ashford. Briefly dated Taylor DuBois. Also former domestic partner of Molly-Lansing Davis. Currently, a doctor at General Hospital.

=== Ashton ===
(Salina Marie Carter, 2010)

Friend of Kiefer Bauer and Willow, who bullied Kristina Davis because of her family.

=== Arielle Gastineau Ashton ===
(Jane Higginson, 1988–89)

Niece of Nicholas Van Buren. Previously married to Larry Ashton, although it was invalid. Had a mysterious past with Colton Shore. Comes to Port Charles during the Dragon Bone quest.

=== Brook Lynn Ashton ===
(Brooke Radding, 1996–2001)
(Adrianne Leon, 2004–06, 2010–11)
(Amanda Setton, 2019–)
(Briana Lane, 2020, 2022)

Singer. Daughter of Ned Ashton and Lois Cerullo, named after Brooklyn, New York, her mother's home town. Mother of Gio Palmieri with Dante Falconeri. Moved home to Bensonhurst in 2006, but returned to Port Charles in 2010. Leaves town again in 2011 to pursue a singing career. Has fairly successful career from 2011 to 2019. Returns to Port Charles in 2019. Loses her singing ability after her throat was slashed by Nelle Benson in 2020, and takes a job with Deception Cosmetics due to portrayer being unable to sing. Helped Maxie Jones protect her daughter by pretending to be her fake baby named Bailey Lois Quartermaine. Married Harrison Chase in 2024.

=== Larry Ashton ===
(Hugo Napier, 1988–89, 1991–92, 2014, 2016)
(Oliver Muirhead, 2017)

Ex-husband of Tracy Quartermaine, father of Ned Ashton. arrives in town married to Arielle Gastineau (later found invalid) and was utilized by Tracy in many of her schemes. He was involved in an ELQ take-over. Left Port Charles after Tracy turned down his marriage proposal. Came back briefly as part of another ELQ take-over attempt. Lives in England.

=== Ned Ashton Quartermaine ===
(Kurt McKinney, 1988–91)
(Wally Kurth, 1991–2007, 2012–)

Son of Larry Ashton and Tracy Quartermaine, part of the Quartermaine family. Father of Brook Lynn Ashton with ex-wife Lois Cerullo. Adoptive father of Leo Falconeri. Grandfather of Gio Palmieri. Previously dated Alexis Davis. Once led a double life – corporate CEO Ned Ashton by day, rock star Eddie Maine by night. Changed his name to Ned Quartermaine in 2019. Married to Olivia Falconeri.

=== Cal Atkins ===
(Leif Riddell, 1992)

Brother of Joe Atkins. Robs Kelly's Diner and shoots Jagger Cates when Jagger protects Ruby Anderson. Assaults Karen Wexler. Supposedly falls to his death after fighting with Jason Quartermaine and Jagger Cates, but resurfaces and is sent to prison.

=== Joe Atkins ===
(Scott Lincoln, 1992)

Brother of Cal Atkins. Murders a police officer and escapes from jail. Penpal of Bobbie Spencer. breaks out of prison and holds her and Tony Jones hostage before being sent back to prison.

=== Peter August (Deceased) ===
(Wes Ramsey, 2017–22)

Son of Cesar Faison and Alex Devane. Ex fiancé of Maxie Jones. Father of Bailey Louise Jones. Former publisher of The Invader. Wanted for the kidnapping of Drew Cain and the murder of Franco Baldwin. Killed by Felicia Scorpio.

== B ==
=== Ashley B. ===
(Amanda Michalka, 2004)

=== Bobby Chandler Baldwin (deceased) ===
(Ted Eccles, 1975–76)

Son of Carolyn Chandler Baldwin; stepson of Lee Baldwin. Medical student in New York. Father to baby boy Chandler. Husband to Samantha Livingston. Was lost at sea.

=== Carolyn Chandler Baldwin (deceased) ===
(Augusta Dabney, 1975–76)

Adoption Agent. Mother of Bobby Chandler. Widow of Mr. Chandler. Married to Lee Baldwin until her death. Grandmother to baby boy Chandler. Was lost at sea.

=== Christina Gail Baldwin ===
(Angela and Michelle Mora, 1999–2000)
(Kaitlyn Maggio, 2001–03 (Port Charles))

Biological child of Julie Devlin and Frank Scanlon. Adopted daughter of Lucy Coe and Scott Baldwin.

=== Dominique Stanton Baldwin (deceased) ===
(Tawny Fere Ellis, 1991)
(Shell Danielson, 1991–93)

Married to Scott Baldwin at the time of her death. Biological mother of Serena Baldwin and Cody Bell. Died of a brain tumor before Serena's birth.

=== Franco Baldwin aka Robert (Bobby) Frank (deceased) ===
(James Franco, 2009–12)
(Roger Howarth, 2013–21)

Biological son of Scott Baldwin and Heather Webber. Raised by Janet Franks. Artist known as Franco, worked as an art therapist at GH. Friends with Liesl Obrecht and Drew Cain. Patient and friend of Kevin Collins. Formerly involved with Nina Reeves and Ava Jerome, long believing her daughter Kiki to be his. Married to Elizabeth Webber. Committed many crimes before a brain tumor was removed, including tormenting Jason Morgan, Sam McCall and Maxie Jones. Killed by Peter August.

=== Gail Adamson Baldwin (Deceased) ===
(Susan Brown, 1977–85, 1989–90, 1992–2002, 2004)

Wife of Lee Baldwin, surrogate mother of Monica Quartermaine. Former psychiatrist at General Hospital.

=== Lee Baldwin (deceased) ===
(Ross Elliott, 1963–65)
(Peter Hansen, 1965–86, 1989–90, 1992–2002, 2004)

Attorney. Adoptive father of Scott Baldwin, husband of Gail Adamson Baldwin.

=== Meg Bentley Baldwin (deceased) ===
(Patricia Breslin, 1965–69)
(Jen Shepard, temp, 1967)
(Elizabeth MacRae, 1969–73)

Mother of Scott Baldwin. Wife of Lee Baldwin. Registered nurse at General Hospital.

=== Scott Baldwin ===
(Johnny Whitaker, 1965–66)
(Teddy Quinn, 1966)
(Tony Camp, 1969–72)
(Don Clarke, 1973–74)
(Johnny Jensen, 1974–75)
(Kin Shriner, 1977–84, 1987–93, 1997–2004, 2007–08, 2013–)

Son of David Bordisso and Meg Bentley, adopted by Lee Baldwin. Ex-husband of Laura Webber and Lucy Coe; widower of Susan Moore and Dominique Stanton. Father of Robert "Franco" Frank, Karen Wexler, Logan Hayes, and Serena Baldwin; adoptive father of Christina Baldwin. Curriently in a relationship with Liesl Obrecht.

=== Serena Lee Baldwin ===
(Carly Schroeder, 1997–2003 on Port Charles, 2017 on GH)
(Kelly Kruger, 2016-)

Daughter of Scott Baldwin and Dominique Stanton Baldwin. Adoptive and surrogate daughter of Lucy Coe. Half-sister of Robert "Franco" Frank, Karen Wexler, Logan Hayes, Christina Baldwin, and Cody Bell.

=== Tom Baldwin ===
(Paul Savior, 1967–72)
(Don Chastain, 1976–77)

Brother of Lee Baldwin. Ex-husband of Audrey March. Father of Thomas Steven Hardy Sr. and grandfather of Thomas Hardy Jr.

=== Hayden Barnes ===
(Rebecca Budig, 2015–17, 2019)

Born Rachel Berlin. Daughter of Jeff Webber and Naomi Dreyfus. Raised by Raymond Berlin who ran a pyramid scheme. Younger paternal half-sister of Elizabeth, Sarah, and Steven Lars Webber. Ex-wife of Nikolas Cassadine. Had a relationship with Hamilton Finn. Suddenly left town, and lied about miscarrying Finn's baby after Finn found out her lies. Returned to town with Jasper Jacks to return the Cassadine fortune to Spencer Cassadine from Valentin Cassadine. When her daughter Violet became ill, she was forced to divulge her existence to Finn. She is currently on the run from Nikolas Cassadine after he paid someone to go after her and say that Valentin was after her.

=== Alec Barrett ===
(Quinn Friedman, 2011)

Biological son of Brenda Barrett and the late Aleksander Janáček. Legal son of Dante Falconeri. Named Aleksander Janáček Jr. at birth. Hidden away by his grandmother Suzanne Stanwyck. Formerly known by the alias Alec Scott.

=== Brenda Barrett ===
(Vanessa Marcil, 1992–98, 2002–03, 2010–11, 2013)

Daughter of Harlan Barrett and Veronica Wilding. Paternal half-sister of Julia Barrett. Ex-wife of Jasper Jacks, Jason Morgan and Sonny Corinthos. Mother of Alec Barrett. Believed to be dead for four years. Lives in Italy with her son

=== Cooper Barrett (deceased) ===
(Jason Gerhardt, 2007–08)

Former soldier in Iraq. One of the seven assailants that take the Metro Court Hotel hostage. Dated Maxie Jones. He was found dead in January 2008, murdered by Diego Alcazar.

=== Harlan Barrett (deceased) ===
(Michael Cole, 1991)

Father of Julia Barrett and Brenda Barrett. Founder of Barrett Industries, member of the Cartel, shot and killed by Bill Eckert, his heir. Grandfather of Alec Barrett.

=== Julia Barrett ===
(Crystal Carson, 1991–93, 1997–98)

Daughter of Harlan Barrett. Paternal half-sister of Brenda Barrett. Dated Jerry Jacks before Brenda met Jax. Aunt of Alec Barrett. Intelligent businesswoman, launched Deception with Scott Baldwin and Dominique Stanton. Dated Bill Eckert, Ned Ashton and A.J. Quartermaine.

=== Lucian Barrett ===
(Elvis Martinez, 2011)

Fake son of Brenda Barrett and Aleksander Janáček. Used as a decoy by Suzanne Stanwyck to throw Brenda off the trail of her real son Alec Barrett.

=== Roger Barrett (deceased) ===
(Nat Christian, 1987)

DVX agent. Held the General Hospital café hostage, threatening to contaminate the whole room with a MOX 36 virus toxin if his demands were not met. Held Bobbie Spencer hostage while trying to make a run for it, later poisoning her with the toxin. Stabbed by Frisco Jones with his own toxin.

=== Alison Barrington (deceased) ===
(Erin Hershey Presley, 2000, 2013; 2000–03 (Port Charles))

Daughter of Elizabeth Barrington. Did not get along with Emily Quartermaine. Kissed Juan Santiago, which made Emily jealous. Returned to Port Charles with her son Rafe on January 30, 2013, so they can find Lucy Coe to help them. Stabbed in the chest by Caleb Morley.

=== Amanda Barrington (deceased) ===
(Anne Jeffreys, 1984–2001, 2004)

Wealthy socialite. Friend to Lila and Edward Quartermaine. Mother of Derek Barrington and grandmother of Alison Barrington. Died sometime between 2004 and 2013.

=== Derek Barrington ===
(Mark Goddard, 1984–86)

Biological father of Mike Webber by Ginny Blake Webber. Son of Amanda Barrington. Married to Lorena Sharpe.

=== Evelyn Bass (deceased) ===
(mentioned character)

Ex-wife of Cody McCall. Mother of Danny McCall. Adoptive mother of Sam McCall. Abandoned Sam and left her with Cody when Sam was very young. Was killed in a house fire set by her mentally handicapped son Danny McCall.

=== Kiefer Bauer (deceased) ===
(Christian Alexander, 2009–10)

Son of Warren and Melinda Bauer. Classmate and boyfriend of Kristina Davis. Was abusive towards Kristina, pressuring her into having sex with him and hospitalizing her twice in early spring 2010. Was the victim of a hit-and-run accident caused by Alexis Davis, dying from his internal injuries shortly after arriving to General Hospital.

=== Melinda Bauer ===
(Lisa Waltz, 2010)

Mother of Kiefer Bauer. Widow of Warren Bauer.

=== Warren Bauer (deceased) ===
(Bradley Cole, 2010)

Father of Kiefer Bauer. Believed to have abused Kiefer. Became obsessed with getting revenge on Alexis Davis and Kristina Davis after Kiefer's death. Shot Mac Scorpio and Ethan Lovett to avenge his son's demise. Shot by Mac in self-defense.

=== Jesse Beaudry (deceased) ===
(Matt Marraccini, 2005–06)

Undercover police officer, partner of Lucky Spencer. Dated Maxie Jones. Shot and killed in the line of duty by Manny Ruiz. Had an older brother, Will, and an older sister.

=== Claudette Beaulieu ===
(Bree Williamson, 2016–17)

Ex-wife of Nathan West. Ex-lover of Griffin Munro and Valentin Cassadine. Surrogate and foster mother of Charlotte Cassadine. Left town trying to get away from Valentin, leaving Charlotte with Griffin. Presumed dead.

=== Brian Beck ===
(Michael McLafferty, 2003–04)

Police officer, attempted to date Courtney Matthews; shot and killed by Andy Capelli.

=== Melissa Bedford ===
(Sharisse Baker-Bernard, 2001)
(Jensen Buchanan, 2001–02)

Lover of Roy DiLucca, killed terminally ill patients at General Hospital (attempted to kill Edward Quartermaine), and went to prison.

=== Katherine Bell (deceased) ===
(Mary Beth Evans, 1993–99)

Half-sister of Dominique Stanton. Ex-fiancée of Stefan Cassadine and ex-lover of Damian Smith and Nikolas Cassadine. Presumed dead after she fell to her death from a balcony, but was revived by Helena Cassadine. She was later murdered in the same manner by Helena, who then framed Cesar Faison.

=== David Bensch ===
(James DePaiva, 2017–18)

Doctor who sexually harassed Kiki Jerome and Alison "Blaze" Ramirez.

=== Clarice Bennett ===
(Kym Hoy, 2007–08)

Assistant to Kate Howard; worked at Crimson Magazine.

=== Nelle Benson (deceased) ===
(Chloe Lanier, 2016–20, 2022)
(Willa Rose, 2020, flashbacks)

Comes to town claiming to be the kidney donor for Josslyn Jacks, and is revealed to be the daughter of the late Frank Benson, Carly Corinthos's adoptive father. Biological daughter of Silas Clay and Nina Reeves and twin sister of Willow Tait. Half sister of Kiki Jerome. Widow of Shiloh; Widow of Julian Jerome. Mother of Wiley Corinthos. Died after falling off a cliff.

=== Kristin Bergman (deceased) ===
Mia Martin (flashbacks, 2002)
Unknown actress (in a picture, 2018)
Melanie Minichino (flashback, 2021)

Swedish opera singer who uses the stage name Kristin Nilsson. Ex-lover of Mikkos Cassadine. Mother of Alexis Davis and Kristina Cassadine. Throat slit by Helena Cassadine in a jealous rage over Kristin's long-term affair with Mikkos. Appeared in flashbacks

=== Jennifer Biles ===
(Jennifer Lyons, 2010)

Secretary for Bernie Abrahms. Very good with numbers. Went on a couple of dates with Ethan Lovett causing Kristina Davis to become jealous.

=== Connor Bishop (deceased) ===
(Tyler Christopher, 2004–05)

Nikolas Cassadine look-alike. Killed by Emily Quartermaine in self-defense.

=== Mary Bishop (deceased) ===
(Catherine Wadkins, 2004)

Widow of Connor Bishop. Brainwashed Nikolas Cassadine after a car accident. Killed Sage Alcazar and Trent Parker in the Quartermaine mansion. Killed by Lorenzo Alcazar after he allegedly switched her medication.

=== Michelle Blake (deceased) ===
(mentioned character)

Murder victim of Ryan Chamberlain was Gloria Wilson's neighbor who was also killed by Ryan.

=== Ginny Blake Webber ===
(Judith Chapman, 1984–86)

Biological mother of Mike Webber, who was adopted by Dr. Rick Webber. Was married to Rick Webber after his wife Lesley Webber was thought to have been killed. Mother of Rick Webber Jr. Accidentally killed D.L. Brock when he threatened to expose her past.

=== Paige Bowen (deceased) ===
(Riley Steiner, 1995)

Biological mother of Emily Quartermaine and Rebecca Shaw. Befriended Monica at the La Mesa Wellness Center in Arizona. Died of breast cancer.

=== Hank Bowen (deceased) ===
(Riley Steiner, 1995)

Biological father of Rebecca Shaw and Emily Quartermaine.

=== Jack Brennan ===
(Charles Mesure, 2023-25)
(Chris L. McKenna, 2025-2026)

Former director of the WSB.

=== Jessie Brewer (deceased) ===
(Emily McLaughlin, 1963–91)
(Aneta Corsaut, temp, 1976)
(Rebecca Herbst, 2015)

Married to Dr. Phil Brewer and good friends with Dr. Steve Hardy. Head nurse at GH.

=== Phil Brewer (deceased) ===
(Roy Thinnes, 1963–65)
(Rick Falk, 1965–66)
(Robert Hogan, 1966–67)
(Ron Hayes, 1967)
(Craig Huebring, 1967)
(Martin West, 1967–75)
(Ryan Carnes, 2015, flashback)

Married to Jessie Brewer three times. Killed by Augusta McLeod on December 6, 1974. Jessie Brewer was accused. Augusta was pregnant with Peter Taylor's child, given up for adoption.

=== Joey Brezetta (deceased) ===
(James Logan 2011)

Worked for Anthony Zacchara. Was one of the thugs who drugged Lucky Spencer. Shot and killed by Johnny Zacchara.

=== Mary Briggs ===
(Anne Helm, 1971–73)

Nurse at General Hospital who is married to a convict. Becomes close with Lee Baldwin while Meg Baldwin is in a sanitarium. Runs away from her husband when he tries to blackmail her.

=== D. L. Brock (deceased) ===
(David Groh, 1983–85)

Abusive husband of Bobbie Spencer and father of Terry Brock. Was killed in self-defense by Ginny Webber.

=== Terry Brock ===
(Robyn Bernard, 1984–90)

Daughter of D. L. Brock. Saw Kevin O'Connor strangle Earl Moody. Formerly married to Kevin O'Connor. Framed for the murders of Sheriff Broder and Ted Holmes by Sarah Simon, who blamed her for Earl's death. Dated Kevin's brother Patrick until he didn't want her to pursue her music career. Dated Dusty Walker.

=== Linc Brown ===
(Dan Buran, 2020-23)

Music producer. Arrested by Dante Falconeri at the Nurses' Ball.

=== Marty Brown ===
(Andrew Tinpo Lee, 2006–09)

Desk Clerk at the Metro Court Hotel.

=== Butcher ===
(unknown actor, 1988)

Low-life for hire. Employed by Scott Baldwin to create havoc at GH. Hired by Olivia Jerome to damage Duke's Club. Found dead by Robert Scorpio looking to question him.

=== Shawn Butler ===
(Sean Blakemore, 2011–16, 2021–22)

Mysterious mercenary who worked for Theo Hoffman/The Balkan. Ex-Marine with post-traumatic stress disorder. Has two sisters, and his mother is deceased. Father of T.J. Ashford. Former bodyguard for Carly Corinthos and Josslyn Jacks. Formerly employed by Sonny Corinthos. Dated Alexis Davis and Jordan Ashford. Was sent to prison for attempted murder. Released from prison in 2021. Former owner of The Invader.

=== Neil Byrne (deceased) ===
(Joe Flanigan, 2019–20)

Is a psychiatrist with special knowledge of getting people out of cults. Patients include Alexis Davis and Kristina Davis Corinthos. Thought to have died of respiratory failure from a drug overdose, but was revealed to have been murdered by Harmony Miller.

== C ==
=== Eddie Cabrera ===
(Christian Monzon, 2012)

Husband of Delores Padilla. Framed for beating up local strippers by Ronnie Dimestico, a police detective.

=== Arthur Cabot ===
(Time Winters, 2019)

Doctor involved with the memory mapping procedure involving Jason Morgan, Drew Cain, Anna Devane and Alex Marick.

=== Andrew "Drew" Cain-Quartermaine ===
(Billy Miller, 2014–19; Steve Burton, 2017–19, photograph & 2019, flashbacks; Cameron Mathison, 2021–)

Twin brother of Jason Morgan. Son of Alan Quartermaine and Susan Moore. Drew was altered through a technology called memory-mapping, making him believe that he was Jason. Father of Oscar Nero and Scout Cain. Was presumed dead after an airplane crash, but later discovered to be alive and captured by Peter August and Victor Cassadine.

=== Emily "Scout" Cain-Quartermaine ===
(Lori and Sevan Andonian, 2017)
(Palmer and Poe Parker, 2017–19)
(Ella Ramacieri, 2019–2021)
(Cosette Abinante, 2022-present)

Daughter of Drew Cain and Sam McCall. Maternal half-Sister of Danny Morgan and Lila McCall (deceased). Paternal half-sister of Oscar Nero (deceased).

=== Asher Caldwell ===
(DaJuan Johnson, 2011)

Employee at E.L.Q Industries. Clashed with Michael Corinthos in the workplace. Worked for Anthony Zacchara.

=== Esther "Mom" and Pop Calhoon ===
(Peggy Converse & Ted Lehman,1980)

Owned a diner which employed Luke and Laura while they were on the run. Good friends to the Whittakers.

=== Florence Campbell ===
(Lynne Moody, 2000–02)

Mother of Gia Campbell and former PCPD detective Marcus Taggert.

=== Gia Campbell ===
(Marisa Ramirez, 2000–02)
(Andrea Pearson, 2002–03)

Daughter of Florence Campbell. Half-sister of former police detective Marcus Taggert. Former student at Columbia Law School. Became world famous model as "The Face of Deception". Ex-fiancée of Nikolas Cassadine. Ex-lover of Alexander "Zander" Smith.

=== Andy Capelli (deceased) ===
(Jay Bontatibus, 2001–04)

Detective for the Port Charles Police Department. Shot Officer Brian Beck and framed Jason Morgan. Later killed by Jason Morgan in self-defense.

=== Mark Carlin ===
(Gary McGurk, 1987, 1989–91)

Reporter who exposes that Duke Lavery (Ian Buchanan) helped Camellia McKay (Elizabeth Keifer) cover her murder of Evan Jerome in 1983.

=== Gillian Carlyle ===
(Marsha Thomason, 2009)

Publicist for mysterious artist Franco. Resides in Europe. Fled with Franco after the disappearances of Sam McCall and Lulu Spencer.

=== Peter Carroll ===
(Dakin Matthews, 2010)

Judge who presided over the trial against Sonny Corinthos for the death of Claudia Zacchara. Ultimately sentenced Michael Corinthos III to five years in the Pentonville prison when his involvement was revealed.

=== Michael Carson ===
(Leif Gantvoort, 2018)

Involved with Shawn Phillips in holding Cassandra Pierce, Hamilton Finn, and Anna Devane captive in revenge for former Ferncliff staff members. He and Shawn Phillips were later arrested and taken into custody.

=== Naomi Carson ===
(Anita Finlay, 2018, 2021)

Judge exposed by Molly Lansing, Alexis Davis, Shawn Butler, Martin Grey, and T.J. Ashford with giving people of color harsher sentences than people not of color.

=== Tammy Carson ===
(Patricia Healy, 1998–2000)
(Tamara Clatterbuck, 2000–01)

Dated Mike Corbin. Friend of Felicia Jones, Dr. Tony Jones, Bobbie Spencer, and Luke Spencer. Former manager of Kelly's Diner.

=== Carter (deceased) ===
(Josh Wingate, 2010–11, 2013)

Inmate in Pentonville prison hired by Franco to rape Michael Corinthos. Killed by Jason Morgan.

=== Theresa Carter (deceased) ===
(Alicia Arden, 2002)

Had an affair with Rick Webber in 1978. Killed by Laura Webber during a fight.

=== Althea Cartwright (deceased) ===
(Donna Denton, 1989)

Katharine Delafield's cousin who schemed with Katharine's fiancée Paul DeVore to kill her for her inheritance. She ended up being shot instead and came back as a ghost to venge herself on Paul which lead to his death.

=== Ace Cassadine ===
Son of Nikolas Cassadine and Esme Prince.

=== Charlotte Cassadine ===
(Scarlett Fernandez, 2016–21, 2023–2025)
(Amelie McClain, 2021–23)
(AnaSofia Bianchi, 2023)
(Bluesy Burke, 2025-)

Daughter of Valentin Cassadine and Lulu Spencer, carried via IVF by Claudette Beaulieu, and granddaughter of the late Helena Cassadine.

=== Dimitri Cassadine ===
(Michael Carvin, 1986)

Mikkos, Victor and Tony's cousin. Came to Port Charles from Brazil as the poor Cassadine, and used Sean Donely to gain a hold of the Quartermaine fortune.

=== Helena Cassadine (deceased) ===
(Elizabeth Taylor, 1981)
(Dimitra Arliss, 1996)
(Constance Towers, 1997–2007, 2009–17, 2019–20, 2022–23)

Rich widow of Mikkos Cassadine. Mother of Stefan Cassadine, Stavros Cassadine, Irina Cassadine, and Valentin Cassadine. Grandmother of Nikolas Cassadine and Charlotte Cassadine. Great-grandmother of Spencer Cassadine and Ace Prince-Cassadine. Cursed Luke and Laura Spencer on their wedding day on November 16, 1981 after her husband and sons were killed by them, and continued to seek revenge on the Spencer family. Had a heart attack and died after cursing Sam Morgan. Was revealed to have been poisoned by Nikolas Cassadine.

=== Irina Cassadine (deceased) ===
(Alyshia Ochse, 2011–12)

Daughter of Helena Cassadine and part of the Cassadine family. Came to town with Dr. Ewen Keenan as his patient and developed a relationship with Ethan Lovett while under the name Cassandra. Shot and killed on Helena's orders when she refused to be part of her mother's plots anymore.

=== Kristina Cassadine (deceased) ===
(Jaime Ray Newman, 2001–03)

Daughter of Mikkos Cassadine and Kristin Bergman. Sister of Alexis Davis. Part of the Cassadine family. Died after an explosion meant for Sonny Corinthos. Her niece, Kristina, is named in honor of her. Ex-lover of Ned Ashton.

=== Mischa Cassadine ===
(Amanda Brooks, 2009)

Private nurse for Helena Cassadine. Formerly resided at the Cassadine Compound in Greece. Suspected to be a member of the family.

=== Mikkos Cassadine (deceased) ===
(John Colicos, 1981)
(Steve Richard Harris, flashbacks, 2021)

Patriarch of the Cassadine family. Was the chief villain in the Ice Princess affair, where he put North America into a deep freeze in mid-July. Was killed while fighting Luke Spencer, who threw him into the ice chamber in self-defense.

=== Nikolas Cassadine ===
(Tyler Christopher, 1996–99, 2003–11, 2013–16)
(Coltin Scott, 1999–2003)
(Chris Beetem, 2005)
(Nick Stabile, 2016)
(Marcus Coloma, 2019–23)
(Adam Huss, 2021–23, temp)

Son of Laura Spencer and Stavros Cassadine, making him part of both the Spencer family and Cassadine family. Maternal half-brother of Lucky Spencer and Lulu Spencer. Father of Spencer Cassadine. Ex-husband of Hayden Barnes; widower of Emily Quartermaine and ex-husband of Lydia Karenin. His uncle, Valentin Cassadine, attempted to murder him in 2016. Presumed dead but revealed to be alive. Ex-husband of Ava Jerome. Now imprisoned at Flatland Federal Prison.

=== Petros Cassadine (deceased) ===
(John Colicos, 1984–85)

Cousin of Mikkos, Anthony, and Victor of the Cassadine family. Looked identical to Mikkos. Supposedly murdered by Helena Cassadine.

=== Sophia Cassadine Davidovitch (deceased) ===
(mentioned character)

Daughter of Adara and Ivan Cassadine, sister of Victor, Mikkos, and Anthony Cassadine and part of the Cassadine family. Wife of Alexi Davidovitch.

=== Spencer Cassadine (deceased) ===
(Caden & Nicholas Laughlin, 2006)
(Nathan and Spencer Casamassima, 2006–07)
(Lance Doven, 2008)
(Rami Yousef, 2008)
(Davin Ransom, 2009–11)
(Nicolas Bechtel, 2013–20)
(Nicolas Chavez, 2021–24)

Son of Nikolas Cassadine and Courtney Matthews, making him part of the Corinthos and Cassadine family. Originally believed to be Jasper Jacks' son. Sent to Spring Ridge for terrorizing Ava Jerome because of her betrayal and marriage to his father Nikolas Cassadine. Presumed dead after falling off the haunted star into the water during a struggle with Esme Prince.

=== Stavros Cassadine (deceased) ===
(John Martinuzzi, 1983)
(Robert Kelker-Kelly, 2001–03, 2013–14)

Son of Mikkos Cassadine and Helena Cassadine of the Cassadine family. Father of Nikolas Cassadine; grandfather of Spencer Cassadine and Ace Cassadine. Presumed dead multiple times, and revived multiple times with his mother's help. Developed an obsession with Laura Spencer, then with her daughter, Lulu. Shot and killed by Dante Falconeri.

=== Stefan Cassadine (deceased) ===
(Stephen Nichols, 1996–2002, 2003)

Son of Mikkos Cassadine and Helena Cassadine of the Cassadine family. Raised his nephew, Nikolas Cassadine. Ex-husband of Bobbie Spencer. Ex-fiancé of Katherine Bell. Ex-lover of Laura Spencer. Fell to his death from a cliff after being stabbed by Luke Spencer.

=== Tony Cassadine (deceased) ===
(André Landzaat, 1981)

A.K.A. Tony Castle. Part of the Cassadine family. Former lover of Alexandria Quartermaine. Came to town as Tony Castle to secretly secure ice princess diamond for Mikkos. He and Alexandria were frozen to death in 1981 when they unknowingly walked into Mikkos Cassadine's ice chamber.

=== Valentin Cassadine ===
(James Patrick Stuart, 2016–24, 2025-)

Son of Helena Cassadine and Victor Cassadine of the Cassadine family. Mercenary and smuggler. Father of Charlotte Cassadine and uncle of Nikolas Cassadine. Ex-husband of Nina Reeves. Went on the run after being exposed as Pikeman. Later seen in Prague. Now in prison.

=== Victor Cassadine (deceased) ===
(Thaao Penghlis, 1981, 2014)
(Charles Shaughnessy, 2021–2023)

Brother of Mikkos and Anthony of the Cassadine family. Father of Valentin. Took part in the Ice Princess scheme with his brothers. Former head of the WSB. Ex-lover of Tiffany Hill Helena Cassadine and Liesl Obrecht. Was presumed dead but was discovered to be alive and working with Peter August with the kidnapping of Drew Cain and Liesl Obrecht. Died when the Haunted Star was blown up by the WSB.

=== Gina Cates ===
(Nikki Cox, 1993–95)
(Gina Gallagher, 1996)
(Stephanie Dicker, 1996–97)

Sister of Jagger Cates and Stone Cates. AIDS activist and former student at Port Charles University. Adopted by the Williamses as a child.

=== Jagger Cates (deceased) ===
(Antonio Sabato Jr., 1992–95; 2008 (General Hospital: Night Shift))
(Adam J. Harrington, 2024)

Brother of Stone Cates and Gina Cates. Ex-husband of Karen Wexler. Ex-lover of Brenda Barrett. Returned to Port Charles in July 2008 as a widower with his young son Stone in order to obtain treatment for Stone's autism, but left later that year to return to San Francisco. Returned to Port Charles in 2024 as a federal agent.

=== Stone Cates (deceased) ===
(Michael Sutton, 1993–95, 2010, 2017)

Died of AIDS complications in 1995. Love of his life was Robin Scorpio. Best friend was Sonny Corinthos. Sonny named his second son Morgan Stone after Jason Morgan and Stone. Brother of Jagger Cates and Gina Cates. His nephew, Stone, is also named in honor of him. Re-appeared as a hallucination to both Robin and Sonny.

=== Dev Cerci (deceased) ===
(Ashton Arbab, 2019–20)

Teenage orphan from Turkey who helped Sonny Corinthos find his son, Dante Falconeri. He made his way to Port Charles to hide out, and Sonny set him up with an illegal identity as Devin Corbin, his distant cousin. Killed in the Floating Rib explosion.

=== Carmine Cerullo ===
(John Capodice, 1994–96)
(George Russo, 2024)

Father of Lois, Mark, Louie, Francine & Chuck Cerullo. Husband of Gloria Cerullo. Grandfather of Brook Lynn Ashton, Patrick, Vincent and Angie Cerullo. Resides in the neighborhood of Bensonhurst, in Brooklyn, New York.

=== Gloria Cerullo ===
(Ellen Travolta, 1994–96, 2000, 2023)

Mother of Lois Cerullo, Mark, Louie, Francine & Chuck Cerullo. Wife of Carmine Cerullo. Grandmother of Brook Lynn Ashton, Patrick, Vincent & Angie Cerullo. Lives in Bensonhurst.

=== Grandpa Cerullo ===
(Mike Robelo, 1995)

Father of Carmine Cerullo. Grandfather of Lois, Mark, Louie, Francine & Chuck.

=== Lois Cerullo ===
(Rena Sofer, 1993–97, 2023–)
(Lesli Kay, 2004–05)

Formerly married to Ned Ashton. Mother of Brook Lynn Ashton. Grandmother of Gio Palmieri. Good friends with Brenda Barrett and Sonny Corinthos. Band manager and founder of L&B Records. Lives in Bensonhurst, in Brooklyn, New York. Cousin of Louie and Noreen.

=== Louie Cerullo ===
(Tony Mangano, 1994–95)

Brother of Lois, Mark, Francine & Chuck Cerullo. Husband of Didi and father of Angie.

=== Mark Cerullo ===
(Richard Tanner, 1994–95)

Son of Carmine and Gloria Cerullo. Brother of Lois, Louie, Francine & Chuck Cerullo. Husband of Noreen & father of twins Patrick & Vincent Cerullo.

=== Noreen Cerullo ===
(Rae Dubow, 1994–95)

Sister-in-law of Lois Cerullo and Louie, Francine & Chuck Cerullo. Wife of Mark Cerullo & mother of twins Patrick & Vincent Cerullo.

=== Patrick Cerullo ===
(Jason Himber, 1994)

Grandson of Carmine and Gloria Cerullo. Son of Mark & Noreen & twin brother of Vincent Cerullo. Nephew of Lois Cerullo.

=== Vincent Cerullo ===
(Drew Himber, 1994)

Grandson of Carmine and Gloria Cerullo. Son of Mark & Noreen & twin brother of Patrick Cerullo. Nephew of Lois Cerullo.

=== Rico Chacone (deceased) ===
(John Vargas, 1990)

Brutally raped Carla Greco after she turned down his marriage proposal. Took several residents and the president of Santo Moro hostage in Port Charles. Tried to assassinate the president of Santo Moro. Killed in self-defense by Carla Greco.

=== Ryan Chamberlain (deceased) ===
(Jon Robert Lindstrom, 1992–95, 2018–2023)

Pediatrician. Identical twin brother of Kevin Collins. Son of Victor Collins and Melanie Chamberlain. Committed several murders; fixated on Felicia Jones because of her resemblance to his mother, who sexually abused him while growing up. Died after he set himself up to die in a bombing. Revealed to be alive, and hidden away by Kevin after Faison's death. Used the name Todd Wilson/Wilson Ritter as an alias. Currently pretending to have Locked In Syndrome after being stabbed in Pentonville. Father of Esme Prince with Heather Webber. Maternal Grandfather of Ace Cassadine. Killed by Mac Scorpio.

=== Harrison Chase ===
(Josh Swickard, 2018–)

Detective with the PCPD. Half-brother to Hamilton Finn. Ex-husband of Willow Tait. Husband of Brook Lynn Quartermaine. Son of Gregory Chase and Jackie Templeton.

=== Carol Cheng ===
(Suzanne Whang, 2011)

Brenda Barrett's wedding planner.

=== Betsy Chilson ===
(Kristin Davis, 1991)

Nurse at General Hospital. Friends with Dawn Winthrop and Meg Lawson.

=== Yank Se Chung ===
(Patrick Bishop, 1985–87)

Doctor at General Hospital. Was the grandson of a very respected member of the Asian Quarter, the Ancient One. Yank's younger brother Tei was killed early on in the Asian Quarter mystery, spurring him to help Robert Scorpio and his pals break up Wu's gang. In the process, he fell in love with Wu's granddaughter, Jade. Joined the staff at GH, and eventually moved to Asia with Jade when his grandfather asked him to use his medical expertise to help their people.

=== Judy Clampett ===
(Robin Blake, 1964–74)

Former nurse at General Hospital.

=== Stephen Clay (deceased) ===
(Michael Easton, 2001–03, 2013)

Former rock singer turned mental patient, after his wife, Livvie Locke, died. Based on the Port Charles character Caleb Morley. Went on a killing spree, believing he was an actual vampire named Caleb Morley. Came to town looking for his "son," Rafe Kovich Jr., and Sam Morgan, a lookalike of his wife. Committed several crimes and pinned them on John McBain, a detective who was his lookalike. Stephen was stabbed by John McBain in self-defense and presumed dead. Uncle of Kiki Jerome, Willow Tait and Nelle Benson.

=== Silas Clay (deceased) ===
(Michael Easton, 2013–15)

Estranged brother of Stephen Clay. Uncle of Rafe Kovich Jr. Ex-lover of Ava Jerome. Father of Kiki Jerome, Willow Tait and Nelle Benson. Ex-husband of Nina Reeves. Murdered by Madeline Reeves.

=== Autumn Clayton ===
(Linda Sanders, 1987–88)

Assistant to Herbert Quartermaine. Inherited Hebert's money when he died. Moved to France.

=== Josh Clayton (deceased) ===
(James Vincent McNichol, 1984–85)

Musician. A close friend of Frisco Jones, Josh had a huge crush on Holly Scorpio. One of his songs was stolen by Blackie Parrish. During the Asian Quarter storyline, Josh was killed by mistake by Mr. Wu's men because Josh was wearing Frisco's jacket. When Frisco realized what had happened, he went undercover to get revenge, joining escapee Sean Donely in his quest to bring Wu down.

=== Brooke Bentley Clinton (deceased) ===
(Adrienne Hayes, 1965–66)
(Indus Arthur, 1970–73)

Daughter of Lloyd Bentley, stepdaughter of Meg Bentley and half-sister of Scott Baldwin. Has an affair with Howie Dawson.

=== Father Coates ===
(Anthony Michael Jones, 2002–12)

Priest at St. Timothy's church. Father Coates is known best for his performing of weddings, christenings, and funerals.

=== Lucy Coe ===
(Lynn Herring, 1986–2004, 2012–)

Ex-wife of Scott Baldwin, Tony Jones, Alan Quartermaine, and Kevin Collins. Adoptive mother of Serena Baldwin and Christina Baldwin. Was raised by her aunt, Charlene Simpson, along with her cousins Colton Shore and Decker Moss. Former chair of the Nurses' Ball. Character moved to the General Hospital spin-off, Port Charles, in 1997. Lived in Paris with Kevin, Serena, and Christina. CEO of Coe Coe Cosmetics in New York City. Returned to Port Charles in 2012 to help plan the Nurses' Ball. Real estate agent. Current CEO of Deception.

=== Darby Collette ===
(Jessica Ahlberg, 2015–16)

College classmate of Molly Lansing and T.J. Ashford. Dated Morgan Corinthos and Dillon Quartermaine.

=== Kevin Collins ===
(Jon Lindstrom, 1994–2004, 2013–)
(Anthony Starke, temp. 2015)

Psychiatrist, formerly on staff at GH. Husband of Laura Spencer; ex-husband of Lucy Coe. Father of Livvie Locke. Identical twin brother of Ryan Chamberlain. Son of Victor Collins and Melanie Chamberlain. Uncle of Esme Prince. Maternal great-uncle of Ace Cassadine. Came to Port Charles to learn more about Ryan's mental illness. Has suffered from mental illness himself. Character moved to the General Hospital spin-off, Port Charles, in 1997. Lived in Paris with Lucy, Serena, and Christina. Returned to Port Charles in 2013 when Lucy was committed to Ferncliff.

=== Vivian Collins ===
(Marie Windsor, 1982, 1987–88)

Former obstetrician at General Hospital. Friend of Steve Hardy.

=== Ray Conway (deceased) ===
(Stephen Burleigh, 1993)

Abused Karen Wexler when she was younger. Dated and physically abused Rhonda Wexler. Accidentally killed by Dr. Alan Quartermaine.

=== Cook (deceased) ===
(mentioned character)

Worked for the Quartermaines as their cook for many years. Hated when anyone else was in her kitchen, and thus people at the house were afraid of her. She quit a few times but always came back. Cook was the first fatality in September 2012 when Jerry Jacks released a deadly pathogen into the Port Charles water supply.

=== Cook II ===
(Carla Hall 2018)

Replaced the deceased "Cook"; first mentioned in August 2013. Cook II is asked by Olivia Falconeri (Lisa LoCicero) to help cook for the 2018 Nurse's Ball since Carly Corinthos (Laura Wright) is in jail.

=== Brad Cooper ===
(Parry Shen, 2013–23, 2024–25, 2025-present)

Biological son of Kim Soong. Nephew of Jade Soong. Nephew of Selina Wu. Lab Manager, Phlebotomist, Security for Selina Wu. Cohort and friend of the late Britta "Britt" Westbourne. Dated Felix DuBois. Ex-husband of Lucas Jones. Last seen on March 29, 2023 attending Epiphany Johnson's memorial service before dropping off the canvas. Returned on August 19, 2024 and later left town on May 8, 2025 for a fresh start. He later returned on December 17, 2025.

=== Mike Corbin (Born Michael Corinthos, Sr.) (deceased) ===
(Ron Hale, 1995–2010)
(Max Gail, 2018–21)

Deadbeat father of Sonny Corinthos and Courtney Matthews. Left Sonny's mother, Adela, when Sonny was little and chose not to be part of Courtney's life after losing her mother's money from poker, leaving them near bankruptcy. Former manager at Kelly's Diner. Left town to seek treatment for a gambling addiction. Died from Alzheimer's disease in 2020. Came back as a ghost to help Sonny get his memory back after falling off a bridge losing his memory, also came back as a ghost to get Sasha and Brando's baby Liam who died due to lack of brain activity.

=== Adela Corinthos (deceased) ===
(Maria Rangel, 1995)
(Iris Almario, 2003–06)

Mother of Sonny Corinthos and Ric Lansing, part of the Corinthos family. Ex-wife of Mike Corbin. Ex-fiancée of Trevor Lansing.

=== Amelia Corinthos ===
(Nathan & Owen Ford, 2023)
(Bo Harrison, 2023)
(Siobhan, 2023)
(Islay & Paisley Kerr, 2023-24)
(Sequoia & Serenity Mork Macko, 2024–)

Daughter of Michael Corinthos and Willow Tait. Paternal half-sister of Wiley Corinthos and Daisy Gilmore. Maternal half-sister of Wiley Cooper-Jones (deceased). Willow suffered from Leukemia during her pregnancy. Amelia was born via emergency c-section but was otherwise healthy.

=== Avery Corinthos ===
(Harper & Presley Carlson, 2014)
(Ava & Grace Scarola, 2014–)
(Celesta DeAstis, 2018)

Daughter of Sonny Corinthos and Ava Jerome. Paternal half-sister of Donna Corinthos, Dante Falconeri, Kristina Davis and Morgan Corinthos and Lila McCall. Adoptive parental half-sister of Michael Corinthos III. Maternal half-sister of Kiki Jerome.

=== Carly Corinthos ===
(Sarah Brown, 1996–2001, 2014)
(Tamara Braun, 2001–05, 2014)
(Shayne Lamas, flashbacks, 2003–05)
(Jennifer Bransford, 2005)
(Laura Wright, 2005–)
(Eden McCoy, flashbacks, 2020)

Co-owner of the Metro Court Hotel. Only daughter of John Durant and Bobbie Spencer. Ex-wife of Sonny Corinthos; formerly married to A.J. Quartermaine, Lorenzo Alcazar, Jason Morgan and Jasper Jacks. Part of the Spencer family. Mother of Michael Corinthos III, Morgan Corinthos, Josslyn Jacks and Donna Corinthos. Grandmother of Wiley Corinthos, Amelia Corinthos, and Daisy Gilmore. Originally came to town to get revenge on her mother Bobbie for giving her up for adoption.

=== Lily Corinthos (deceased) ===
(Lilly Melgar, 1994–96, 2001, 2003)

First wife of Sonny Corinthos. While pregnant with Sonny's child, she was killed by her mob boss father Hernando Rivera (deceased) in a car bombing meant for Sonny. Dated Miguel Morez and had a son with him (Juan Santiago).

=== Wiley Cooper-Jones ===
(Erik and Theodore Olson, 2018–2021)
(Kyler and Caleb Ends, 2021)
(Viron Weaver, 2021–present)

Son of Michael Corinthos and Nelle Benson. Nephew of Willow Tait. Brother of Amelia Corinthos and Daisy Gilmore. Switched shortly after birth with the real Wiley Cooper-Jones (who assumed the name Jonah Corinthos) by Nelle and Brad Cooper. Adopted by Willow Tait.

=== Michael Corinthos ===
(Dylan and Blake Hopkins, 1997–2001)
(Tiarnan Cunningham, 2001)
(Dylan Cash, 2002–08)
(Drew Garrett, 2009–10)
(Chad Duell, 2010–25)
(Robert Adamson, 2022)
(Rory Gibson, since 2025)

Son of Carly Corinthos and A. J. Quartermaine, adopted by Sonny Corinthos. Maternal half-brother of Morgan Corinthos (also adoptive full brother) and Josslyn Jacks; adoptive paternal half-brother of Kristina Davis, Dante Falconeri, Lila McCall and Avery Corinthos. Father to Wiley Corinthos, Amelia Corinthos, and Daisy Gilmore. Fell into a coma for a year after suffering a gunshot wound to the head in a hit meant for Sonny. Former CEO of ELQ, now running Aurora Media.

=== Morgan Corinthos (deceased) ===
(Jake Simms, 2005)
(George Juarez, 2005–09)
(Aaron Refvem, 2009–10)
(Aaron Sanders, 2010–11)
(Bryan Craig, 2013–16, 2018, 2024)

Son of Sonny Corinthos and Carly Corinthos. Paternal half-brother of Dante Falconeri, Kristina Davis, Lila McCall and Avery Corinthos. Maternal half-brother of Michael Corinthos III (also adoptive full brother) and Josslyn Jacks. Named after Stone Cates and Jason Morgan. Ex-husband of Kiki Jerome. Killed by a car bombing meant for Julian Jerome.

=== Sonny Corinthos ===
(Maurice Benard, 1993–present)

Mob boss, owner of clubs in the Caribbean, and legitimate coffee importer. Most notable member of the Corinthos family. Ex-husband of Carly Corinthos; ex-husband of Brenda Barrett; ex-husband of Nina Reeves; widower of Lily Rivera and Claudia Zacchara. Father of Dante Falconeri, Kristina Davis, Morgan Corinthos, Lila McCall (stillborn), Avery Corinthos, and Donna Corinthos; Adoptive father of Michael Corinthos III. Was presumed dead after falling off a bridge but was recovering under the name Mike in Nixon Falls, Pennsylvania.

=== Elena Cosgrove (deceased) ===
(Rebecca Holden, 1987)

Songwriter who co-wrote the song "40 Million Stars". Was thought of as a sister by Dusty Walker, but used her song to brainwash him. Engineered the assassination of both WSB and DVX agents. Killed after being struck by a bus trying to evade arrest.

=== Angie Costello ===
(Jana Taylor, 1963–66, 1993)

Part of the original cast. Daughter of Mike Costello. First patient of Steve Hardy. Gave birth to a child with Eddie Weeks, which was initially given up for adoption to Fred and Janet Fleming. Angie and Eddie get married, and take back their baby; they then moved to Chicago.

=== Mike Costello ===
(Ralph Manza, 1963)

Part of the original cast. Father of Angie Costello. Sues the Weeks family after Eddie Weeks is driving the car during an accident with Angie.

=== Blair Cramer ===
(Kassie DePaiva, 1993–2013 on One Life to Live; 2012; 2023 on General Hospital)

Mother of Starr Manning and Jack Manning with Todd Manning, and adoptive mother of Sam Manning with Victor Lord Jr. Grandmother of Hope Manning-Thornhart (deceased). Came to Port Charles in 2012 to comfort her daughter, Starr, as she grieves for Cole Thornhart and daughter Hope. Third ex-wife of Martin Grey.

=== Bo Crowell ===
(Brian Turk, 2008)

First cousin of Jolene and Nadine Crowell.

=== Jolene Crowell ===
(Amanda Baker, 2007)

Student nurse at General Hospital. Sister of Nadine Crowell. Slept with Damian Spinelli. Niece of Raylene Crowell. Worked for a company trying to buy GH and was the source of a number of deaths and accidents to discredit GH. Was shot and left in a coma after trying to save Spinelli.

=== Nadine Crowell ===
(Claire Coffee, 2007–09)

Former nurse at General Hospital. Dated Nikolas Cassadine. Sister of Jolene Crowell and niece of Raylene Crowell.

== D ==
=== Marco Dane (deceased) ===
(Gerald Anthony, 1992–93)

Opportunist from Llanview who becomes Jagger Cates's boxing promoter. Blackmails many citizens of Llanview and Port Charles. Hired by Tracy Quartermaine to dig up Jenny Eckert's past.

=== Nico Dane (deceased) ===
(Ryan Alosio, 2004)

Ex-boyfriend of Sam McCall. Had run a carjacking ring with Sam, who eventually testifies against him to avoid her own criminal charges. After getting out of jail, he comes to Port Charles as an employee of Faith Rosco in order to get Sam back, kidnapping her twice. Shot and killed by Jason Morgan, who saves Sam.

=== Gina Dante-Lansing ===
(Anna Stuart, 1977–78)
(Donna Baccala, 1978–79)

Doctor at General Hospital. Sister of Mark Dante. Married to Gary Lansing.

=== Mark Dante ===
(John York, 1976)
(Michael Delano, 1976)
(Gerald Gordon, 1976–78, 1982–83,)

Doctor at General Hospital. Has an affair with Terri Webber Arnett. Married to Mary-Ellen, later marries and becomes a widower of Katie Corbin Dante.

=== Mary Ellen Dante ===
(Lee Warrick, 1976–77)

Wife of Mark Dante. Has a mental breakdown and is sent to a sanitarium.

=== Quinn Danvers ===
(Jennifer Bassey, 2017)
Book publisher who came to Port Charles wanting to set up a book launch with "Man Landers".

=== Sophia Cassadine Davidovitch (deceased) ===
(mentioned character)

Daughter of Adara and Ivan Cassadine, sister of Victor, Mikkos, and Anthony Cassadine and part of the Cassadine family. Wife of Alexi Davidovitch.

=== Alexis Davis (born Natasha Cassadine) ===
(Nancy Lee Grahn, 1996–)
(Susan Diol, temp. 2001–02)
(Kristen Erickson, temp 2006)
(Gable Swanlund, flashbacks, 2021)
(Stephanie Erb, temp, 2022)

Daughter of Mikkos Cassadine and Kristin Bergman; part of the Cassadine family. Mother of Sam McCall, Kristina Davis, and Molly Lansing. Ex-wife of Ric Lansing, Jasper Jacks, and Julian Jerome. Engaged at one point to Ned Ashton. Former defense attorney for Sonny Corinthos and former law firm partner of Diane Miller. Now working as an editor at The Invader.

=== Harrison Davis ===
(Kevin Best, 1990)

Neurosurgeon at General Hospital who treats Tony Jones. Obsessed with Simone Ravelle Hardy, with whom he has an affair. Marries Meg Lawson. Later leaves town.

=== Kristina Davis ===
(Kara and Shelby Hoffman, 2003)
(Sarah and Emma Smith, 2003–05)
(Kali Rodriguez, 2005–08)
(Lexi Ainsworth, 2009–11, 2015–2023)
(Lindsey Morgan, 2012–13)
(Kate Mansi, 2023–2026)

Daughter of Sonny Corinthos and Alexis Davis; part of the Cassadine and Corinthos family. Maternal half-sister of Sam McCall and Molly Lansing. Paternal half-sister of Dante Falconeri, Morgan Corinthos, Lila McCall, Avery Corinthos, and Donna Corinthos. adoptive paternal half-sister of Michael Corinthos. Ex-wife of Trey Mitchell. Currently working as a bartender at Charlie's Pub and serving as surrogate mother for Molly Davis and TJ Ashford's baby.

=== Howie Dawson ===
(Ray Girardin, 1968–74)

Marries Jane Dawson, has numerous affairs with other women. Administrator at General Hospital. Moves to New York City.

=== Jane Harland Dawson ===
(Shelby Hiatt, 1968–75)

Previously married to Howie Dawson. Cousin of Augusta McLeod. Adoptive mother of Joanne Dawson. Nurse at General Hospital.

=== Margaux Dawson ===
(Elizabeth Hendrickson, 2018–19)

Daughter of Vincent & Jeanette Marino. Paul Hornsby's successor as district attorney.

=== Mrs. Dawson ===
(Maxine Stuart, 1968; Phyllis Hill, 1970–74)

Howie Dawson's mother.

=== Katherine Delafield ===
(Edie Lehmann, 1988–90)

Famous pianist. Katherine's family mysteriously dies in accidents secretly arranged by Katherine's cousin and fiancé, Paul Devore. She and Robert Scorpio spar when they first meet, but the duo quickly becomes attracted to one another. Robert and Katherine become engaged, but Duke Lavery's death interrupts and indefinitely postpones their marriage. After Robert realizes he cannot fully commit to her, she leaves in 1990 with her adopted son King Delafield.

=== King Delafield ===
(Christopher Babers, 1990)

Adopted son of Katherine Delafield.

=== Téa Delgado ===
(Florencia Lozano, 2012)

Attorney. Mother of Danielle Manning and Victor Lord III (stillborn). Comes to Port Charles in 2012 to provide legal counsel for Starr Manning, who had held mobster Sonny Corinthos at gunpoint. Returns to Llanview with her son that really is the baby of Sam and Jason Morgan, who is later returned and named Daniel Morgan.

=== Lourdes Del Torro ===
(Kristin Herrera, 2004–08)

=== Desiree (deceased) ===
(Chi-en Telemaque, 1990)

Mistress of Cesar Faison. Murdered by Faison, but her death is ruled a suicide.

=== Anna Devane ===
(Finola Hughes, 1985–92, 1995, 2006–08, 2012–)
(Camilla Moore, 1991–92, temporary)

Ex-PCPD Police-Commissioner and former WSB agent. Mother of Robin Scorpio and Leora Hayward (deceased). Marries Duke Lavery, Robert Scorpio, and David Hayward (on All My Children). Grandmother of Emma Drake and Noah Scorpio-Drake. Believes Peter August to be her twin sister Alex's child by Cesar Faison, but allows him to continue to believe she is his mother. Engaged to Dr. Hamilton Finn but later broke up at their wedding.

=== Ian Devlin (deceased) ===
(Seamus Dever, 2008)

Doctor at General Hospital who is involved in a drug-importing scheme with Claudia Zacchara. Friend of Patrick Drake in medical school. Shoots Michael Corinthos in a botched attempt on Sonny Corinthos' life, and is later killed by Jason Morgan. Tried to begin a friendship with Sam McCall after he treated her several times.

=== Paul Devore ===
(Joseph Burke, 1989)

Engaged to Katherine Delafield.

=== Mickey Diamond (deceased) ===
(Nick Chinlund, 2014)

Works for the fake Luke Spencer, whom ordered him to keep an eye on Julian Jerome. Flirted with Jordan Ashord, who was undercover. Shot and killed by Julian after he blew up Alexis Davis' house. His heart was donated to Alice Gunderson.

=== Roy DiLucca ===
(Asher Brauner, 1978–79)
(A Martinez, 1999–2002)

Father of Hannah Scott. Fakes his death in 1979 after a failed assassination attempt on Sen. Mitch Williams. Mob associate of Luke Spencer. Lover of Bobbie Spencer.

=== Ronnie Dimestico (deceased) ===
(Ronnie Marmo, 2009–12)

Police detective and Dante Falconeri's lieutenant. Grows up with Dante and Olivia Falconeri in Bensonhurst. Has a mysterious past with Franco. Shows signs of corruption, such as hiding Johnny Zacchara's gun after he is shot by Sonny Corinthos in self-defense. Revealed to be the man attacking strippers and the gunman that tried to shoot Dante in the Metro Court parking garage. Kidnaps Lulu Spencer and Sam McCall, eventually holding them hostage at The Haunted Star. Killed by John McBain in a shootout.

=== Landon Dixon ===
(Troy Ruptash, 2016)

Arms dealer working with Paul Hornsby. Took hostages at the wedding of Julian Jerome and Alexis Davis in revenge for Helena Cassadine leaving mayor Janice Lomax, former district attorney Ric Lansing, and TJ Ashford unharmed. Caught and sent to prison and the will reading of Helena Cassadine in the aftermath.

=== Andrew Domman (deceased) ===
(Unknown actor)

Thug shot and killed by Jason Morgan in 2005.

=== Anna Donely ===
(Courtney Halverson, 2013)
(Caitlin Reilly, 2021)

Daughter of Sean Donely and Tiffany Hill. Sister of Connor Olivera. Cousin of Lucas Jones. Born off-screen in Boston, Massachusetts in late 1995. Appears on-screen for the first time when Luke Spencer and Holly Sutton go to Ireland and meet her when they arrive at the Donely family home. Named after Anna Devane. Revealed to be a WSB Agent when she appears onscreen in 2021 for her father's funeral.

=== Sean Donely (deceased) ===
(John Reilly, 1984–95, 2008 (General Hospital: Night Shift), 2013)

Police Commissioner of Port Charles. Husband of Tiffany Hill. Father of Connor Olivera and Anna Donely. Commits adultery with Jessica Holmes, and she becomes pregnant, it is not known whether Sean is the father of the child, as Jessica is murdered by Ryan Chamberlain before the baby is born.

=== Tiffany Hill Donely ===
(also known as Elsie Mae Crumholz)

(Sharon Wyatt, 1981–84, 1986–95, 2008 (General Hospital: Night Shift), 2021)

Sister of Cheryl Stansbury. Wife of Sean Donely. Mother of Anna Donely. Biological aunt of Lucas Jones.

=== Sasha Donev (deceased) ===
(Sandra Hess, 2008)

Lawyer for Russian crime lord Andre Karpov. Has Jake Spencer kidnapped. Shot and killed by an unknown sniper.

=== Claude Donnet ===
(Curt Lowens, 1989)

=== Pierce Dorman (deceased) ===
(Bradley White, 1996)
(Rob Youngblood, 1996)
(Tuc Watkins, 1996–97)

Physician at General Hospital. Has an affair with Monica Quartermaine. Sues Monica for sexual harassment. Murdered by a drug dealer at the hospital.

=== Emma Grace Scorpio-Drake ===
(Ruby & Rose Romero, 2008)
(Gianna and Jessie Salvatierra, 2009–2010)
(Francesca Cistone, 2010–2011)
(Brooklyn Rae Silzer, 2011–2018, 2020, 2023)

Daughter of Patrick Drake and Robin Scorpio. Sister of Noah Robert Scorpio-Drake. Paternal half-sister of Gabriel Santiago. Niece of Sasha Gilmore Corbin. Moved to Berkeley, California with her parents.

=== Martin Drake ===
(Ward Costello 1981–1982)

Noah Drake's uncle. He was a New York senator. He visited his nephew in Port Charles from time to time.

=== Noah Drake ===
(Rick Springfield, 1981–1983, 2005–2008, 2012–2013)

Neurosurgeon at General Hospital. Look-alike of rock star Eli Love. Recovering alcoholic. Father of Patrick Drake and Matt Hunter. Has returned on several occasions in 2008, 2012, and 2013.

=== Noah Robert Scorpio-Drake ===
Son of Patrick Drake and Robin Scorpio. Brother of Emma Drake. Paternal half-brother of Gabriel Santiago.

=== Patrick Drake ===
(Jason Thompson, 2005–16)

Neurosurgeon. Husband of Robin Scorpio. Father of Emma Drake, Gabriel Santiago and Noah Scorpio-Drake. Son of Noah Drake and Mattie Drake. Paternal half-brother of Matt Hunter. Moved family to Berkeley, California.

=== Mattie Drake (deceased) ===
(Mentioned character)

Mother of Patrick Drake. Was married to Noah Drake. Died in 1993.

=== Naomi Dreyfus (deceased) ===
(Robin Riker, 2016)
(Gigi Bermingham, 2021)

Mother of Hayden Barnes. Ex-wife of Raymond Berlin. Was found dead in her hotel room by Shawn Butler and Sam McCall.

=== Amy Driscoll ===
(Risa Dorken, 2016–25)

Nurse at General Hospital. Sister of Chet Driscoll.

=== Chet Driscoll ===
(Chris Van Etten, 2017–19, 2022)

Brother of Amy Driscoll. Army veteran who was wounded in action.

=== Felix DuBois ===
(Marc Anthony Samuel, 2012–2024)

Nurse at General Hospital. Friend of Sabrina Santiago. Brother of Taylor DuBois. Dated Lucas Jones and Brad Cooper.

=== Taylor DuBois ===
(Samantha Logan, 2013)
(Pepi Sonuga, 2013)

Sister of Felix DuBois.

=== Toussaint Dubois ===
(Billy Dee Williams, 2009)

Hospital janitor with a mysterious past. Friend of Epiphany Johnson.

=== John Durant (deceased) ===
(Corbin Bernsen, 2004–06)

Father of Carly Corinthos and Grandfather of Michael Corinthos, Morgan Corinthos, Josslyn Jacks, and Donna Corinthos. Prosecuting attorney. Killed by Manny Ruiz in 2006.

=== Algernon Durban ===
(Nicholas Hammond, 1984–1985)

Con-artist cousin of Holly Scorpio. Brother of Alistair Durban.

=== Alistair Durban ===
(Charles Shaughnessy, 1984)

Con artist cousin of Holly Scorpio. Brother of Algernon Durban.

=== James Duvall (deceased) ===
(Arthur Roberts, 1981)

Pushed down the stairs by Alexandria Quartermaine. Once dates Alexandria Quartermaine.

=== Angela Dwire ===
(mentioned character)

Attorney for the Zacchara family. Arranges to have Brandon Lowell and Anthony Zacchara set free.

== E ==
=== Angela Eckert ===
(Carol Lawrence, 1991–92)

Mother of Bill and Jenny Eckert. Married to Fred Eckert. Grandmother of Sly Eckert and Paul Hornsby Jr.

=== Bill Eckert (deceased) ===
(Anthony Geary, 1991–93)
(Joey Luthman, flashback, 2015)

Brother of Jenny Eckert and look-alike cousin of Luke Spencer. Was an employee of Harlan Barrett and member of the cartel. Killed by Frank Smith's men after being mistaken for Luke Spencer.

=== Fred Eckert (deceased) ===
(William Boyett, 1991)

Father of Bill and Jenny Eckert. Husband of Angela Moscini. Brother of Lena Eckert-Spencer. Grandfather to Paul Hornsby Jr. and Sly Eckert. Died of a heart attack.

=== Jenny Eckert ===
(Cheryl Richardson, 1991–94, 1996)

An environmentalist once married to Ned Ashton. Married to Paul Hornsby.

=== Nancy Eckert (deceased) ===
(Linda Dona, 1991)

Ex-wife of Bill Eckert. Murdered by her son Sly's babysitter.

=== Sly Eckert ===
(Glenn Walker Harris Jr., 1991–96)

Son of Bill Eckert and Nancy Eckert. Nephew of Jenny Eckert.

=== William Eichner (deceased) ===
(Mitchell Fink, 2014)

Associate at the Crichton-Clark Clinic. Presumably killed in an explosion at the clinic.

=== Angel Sorel Ellis ===
(Angel Boris, 2001)

Private investigator. Daughter of Joseph Sorel. Widow of Donnie Ellis. Helped Sonny after he was stabbed by Sorel. Fled town after the police learned that she killed Sorel. Former lover of Sonny and Jax.

=== Ron Engle ===
(Eddie Zammit, 1980)

=== Eric ===
(Scott Hamm, 2022)

Armed robber at Charlie's Pub

=== Marianna Erosa ===
(America Olivio, 2008)
(Yeniffer Behrens, 2008)

Waitress in Martha's Vineyard. Hired by Trevor Lansing to manipulate his son, Ric Lansing. Had a very mysterious past. Dated Ric Lansing.

=== Carla Escobar ===
(Nia Peeples, 1983–84)

=== Miguel Escobar ===
(Marco Rodriguez, 2006)

=== Tina Estrada ===
(Chandra Wilson, 2014)

=== Eugene ===
(Willie C. Carpenter, 1994)

=== Deirdre Evans ===
(Valerie Wildman, 2009)

=== Jimmy Everett ===
(Joseph Campanella, 1991–92)

== F ==
=== Iris Fairchild ===
(Peggy McCay, 1967–70)

A reformed alcoholic that becomes close with Lee Baldwin while working in his office. When Lee returns to his wife Meg Baldwin, Iris returns to nursing at General Hospital.

Cesar Faison (deceased)

(Anders Hove, 1990–92, 1999–2000, 2012–14, 2018)

International criminal and arms dealer. Former DVX agent. Developed an obsession with Anna Devane, which led to him terrorizing many residents of Port Charles over the years. Often conspired with Helena Cassadine. Father of Britt Westbourne and Nathan West with Liesl Obrecht, and Peter August with Alex Marick. Shot and killed by Jason Morgan

=== Dante Falconeri ===
(Dominic Zamprogna, 2009–)

Detective at the PCPD. Son of Olivia Falconeri and Sonny Corinthos. Ex-husband of Lulu Spencer. Father of Gio Palmieri and Rocco Falconeri. Paternal half-brother of Kristina Davis, Morgan Corinthos, Lila McCall, and Avery Corinthos, Donna Corinthos, and maternal half-brother of Leo Falconeri. Adoptive paternal half-brother of Michael Corinthos III. Originally came to town as an undercover police officer wanting to take down Sonny, not knowing he was his father. Currently in a relationship with Sam McCall.

=== Leo Falconeri ===
(Verity Jann, October 9, 2015;)
(Silas and Ezra, 2015)
(Leo and Luca, 2016–17)
(Pressly James Crosby, 2017–18)
(Max Matenko, 2018)
(Aaron Bradshaw, 2018–19)
(Easton Rocket Sweda, 2021–)
(Isaiah Dell, 2022)

Son of Julian Jerome and Olivia Falconeri. Adoptive son of Ned Quartermaine. Paternal half-brother of Sam McCall and Lucas Jones. Maternal half-brother of Dante Falconeri. Stepson of Nelle Benson. Recently found out that he has Autism Spectrum Disorder.

=== Lesley Lu "Lulu" Spencer Falconeri ===
(Amanda and Kerrianne Harrington, 1994–95)
(Clare and Maribel Moses, 1995)
(Alisyn and Kelli Griffith, 1995–2001)
(Stephanie Allen, 2001–03)
(Tessa Allen, 2004–05)
(Julie Marie Berman, 2005–13)
(Emme Rylan, 2013–20)
(Alexa Havins, 2024-)

Only daughter of Luke Spencer and Laura Spencer. Part of the Spencer family and part of the Corinthos family by marriage. Sister of Lucky Spencer. Maternal half-sister of Nikolas Cassadine and paternal half-sister of Ethan Lovett. Ex-wife of Dante Falconeri. Was impregnated by Dillon Quartermaine in 2006 and had an abortion. Biological mother of Rocco Falconeri and Charlotte Cassadine. Owner of The Haunted Star. Was in a coma until November 2024 after injuries sustained after the Floating Rib explosion.

=== Olivia Falconeri ===
(Lisa Lo Cicero, 2008–)

Romanced Sonny Corinthos back in Bensonhurst when the two were teenagers. Cousin of Kate Howard. Mother of Dante Falconeri with Sonny and Leo Falconeri with Julian Jerome. Grandmother of Gio Palmieri and Rocco Falconeri. Married to Ned Quartermaine. Ex-lover of Johnny Zacchara. Once engaged to Steve Webber. Runs the Metro Court Hotel with Carly Corinthos. Injected with LSD by Heather Webber.

=== Rocco Falconeri ===
(Nolan and Michael Webb, 2013)
(Diego and Mateo, 2013–14)
(Liam and Oliver, 2014–15)
(Charles and Ethan Losie, 2015–16)
(Mason Tannous, 2016)
(O’Neill Monahan, 2017–20)
(Brady Bauer, 2021)
(Finn Francis Carr, 2022–)

Biological son of Dante Falconeri and Lulu Spencer. Carried by Britt Westbourne via surrogacy; Britt claimed Rocco was her son with Patrick Drake. Paternal half-brother of Gio Palmieri. Maternal half-brother of Charlotte Cassadine. Part of the Corinthos, Spencer and Webber families.

=== Cameron Faulkner ===
Married to Lesley (Williams) Webber (m. 1975; died 1976). Attempted to keep Lesley from finding her daughter, Laura. Died in a car crash.

=== Rita Ferlito ===
(Suanne Spoke, 2017–18)

=== Stella Fields (deceased) ===
(Jeff Donnell, 1979–88)

Former Quartermaine maid who quit when she won the lottery. Ran Pickle-Lila Relish with Lila Quartermaine and Sean Donely. In 2013, it was referenced that Stella died sometime after 1988.

=== Hamilton Finn ===
(Michael Easton, 2016–24)

Infectious Disease Doctor at General Hospital. Brother of Harrison Chase possible father of him. Was engaged to Hayden Barnes. She left town and let him believed she miscarried. Came back later and he eventually learned he had a daughter Violet. Was engaged to Anna Devane. His first wife died. Dated Elizabeth Webber. Left town to go to rehab for his drinking.

=== Violet Finn ===
(Jophielle Love, 2019–24)

Daughter of Hamilton Finn and Hayden Barnes. Left with her father for Seattle.

=== Mary Finnegan ===
(Mary Jo Catlett, 1989–90)

Housekeeper and close friend of Katharine Delafield. Aunt of Jimmy O'Herlihy.

=== Bree Flanders ===
(Meredith Vieira, 2003)

=== Fred Fleming ===
(Simon Scott, 1963)

Part of the original cast, Fred is the husband of Janet Fleming. Together they adopt the illegitimate child of Angie Costello and Eddie Weeks. Angie and Eddie marry and kidnap the baby back.

=== Janet Fleming ===
(Ruth Phillips, 1963)

Part of the original cast, Janet is married to Fred Fleming. Dr. Phil Brewer performs a hysterectomy on her to save her life, but faces charges for performing the procedure without Fred's knowledge. Janet and Fred adopt the illegitimate child of Angie Costello and Eddie Weeks. Angie and Eddie marry and kidnap the baby back.

=== Nurse Fletcher ===
(Mary-Pat Green, 2012)

Nurse who takes care of Robin Scorpio while she is held captive by Ewen Keenan and Jerry Jacks on behalf of Cesar Faison.

=== Andrea Floyd (deceased) ===
(Martha Byrne, 2009)

Wife of former Port Charles Mayor Garrett Floyd. Became a suspect in the murder of Garrett's mistress, Brianna Hughes. In an attempt to keep the truth hidden, she planted evidence in the home of District Attorney Alexis Davis to make her look like a jealous ex-lover. Also poisoned Edward Quartermaine to keep him quiet about the murder. Later that day, in an ironic twist, Edward suffered a heart attack because of the poisoning, causing him to lose control of his car and run down Andrea. She later died at General Hospital.

=== Garrett Prescott Floyd ===
(John Bolger, 2006–12)

Mayor of Port Charles from 2006 until 2012, when he was replaced by Janice Lomax. Widower of Andrea Floyd. Initially a suspect in the murder of his mistress Brianna Hughes, for which his wife Andrea was later found guilty. In an attempt to protect himself, he brought to light his brief 2006 affair with District Attorney Alexis Davis. Floyd announced in December 2011 that he would be going by his middle name, Prescott.

=== Catherine Flynn (deceased) ===
(Gloria Stuart, 2002–03)

Owned a club in the 1920s in Port Charles. Married to Marco and had a son given up for adoption. Grandmother of Faith Rosco. Killed by Faith so that she could gain her inheritance.

=== Russell Ford (deceased) ===
(Richard Gant, 2007–08)

Doctor and former chief of staff at General Hospital. Killed when a car crashed into the Emergency Room.

=== Parker Forsyth ===
(Ashley Jones, 2016–17)

Professor at Wesleyan University and Port Charles University. Formally Married to a woman named Amanda. Kristina Davis had a crush on Parker, her professor, but she claims she didn't reciprocate. After Parker is fired from PCU, she proclaimed her love for Kristina and they've run away to Oregon to live happily off screen.

=== Foster (deceased) ===
(Foster the Dog, 1994–98)

A French mastiff adopted by Luke, Laura and Lucky Spencer. As a stray, he was hit by a car, prompting Lucky Spencer to walk again after being shot. Foster's death was faked after he was arrested for biting a bully, and he was "reborn" as Foster II. Alerted family when Laura fell down the basement steps and went into labor with Lulu Spencer. Fathered Raoul after running away with Annabelle, the Quartermaine's French Briard, making him the enemy of Edward Quartermaine. Last actual appearance on August 7, 1998. Only referred to off-screen after Lucky left the Spencer home. Date of death unknown. Trained by Cheryl Harris.

=== Irma Foster ===
(Dwan Smith, 1987)

Head of the Psychiatric Department at General Hospital.

=== Rock Fowler ===
(Matt Iseman, 2003)

A Thug

=== Colette Francoise ===
(Amy Gibson, 1980s)

=== Betsy Frank ===
(Betsy Franco, 2010, 2013–14)
(Deborah Strang, 2017–18, 2022)

Adoptive mother of Robert "Franco" Frank. Heather Webber sold her son to Betsy Frank, who then proceeded to raise Franco as her own. She later changed her name to Karen Anderson.

=== Hester Frumpkin ===
(Meg Wyllie, 1982)

== G ==
=== Jimmy G. ===
(Robert DiTillo, 2006)

=== Ellen Garten ===
(Diahnna Nicole Baxter, 2023)

Former Warden at Pentonville Penitentiary.

=== Garvey (deceased) ===
(Rick Ravanello, 2017)

Ex-con looking for revenge on Sonny Corinthos for killing his brother. Kidnapped Spencer Cassadine. Died of complications after being shot by Sonny.

=== Ivy Gatling ===
(Kelly Frye, 2014–15)

Daughter of Richard Gatling. Briefly dated Nikolas Cassadine.

=== Richard Gatling ===
(Holmes Osborne, 2015)

New York state governor. Father of Ivy Gatling. Granted Sonny Corinthos a pardon from his prison sentence after he saved Ivy's life.

=== Max Giambetti ===
(Derk Cheetwood, 2002–17, 2019)

Bodyguard for Sonny Corinthos and Jason Morgan. Briefly a security guard at the Metro Court Hotel. Son of Maximus Giambetti and brother of Milo Giambetti. Had a major crush on Sonny's ex-wife, Carly Corinthos, but later started dating mob lawyer Diane Miller.

=== Maximus Giambetti ===
(Vincent Pastore, 2008)

A well-known and legendary mob boss, deported from the country. Father of Max and Milo Giambetti. Max tells his father that he is the boss of the crime family in Port Charles, and pleads everyone to play along, including Maxie Jones, Carly Corinthos and Claudia Zacchara. Maximus later reveals that he knew of the ruse all along and that he is proud of Max for earning enough respect to get everyone to lie for him. Maximus then flees the country in order to avoid the FBI.

=== Milo Giambetti ===
(Drew Cheetwood, 2006–17, 2019, 2023)

Former bodyguard for Sonny Corinthos and Jason Morgan. Son of Maximus Giambetti. Brother of Max Giambetti. Has a major crush on Lulu Spencer; later fell for Epiphany Johnson. Also known as "Magic Milo" on many different occasions, preferably the Nurses' Ball.

=== Ray Gibbons ===
(Spencer Milligan, 1987)

=== Giles ===
(John Vance, 2023)

Ava Jerome's British butler at Wyndemere Castle replacing Alfred during her ownership of Wyndemere Castle.

=== Daisy Gilmore ===
(Brenden & Evelyn Beimford, 2025)
(Levi Clark Coughlin, 2025)

Daughter of Michael Corinthos and Sasha Gilmore. Maternal half-sister of Liam Corbin; Paternal half-sister of Wiley Cooper-Jones and Amelia Corinthos. Granddaughter of A. J. Quartermaine, Carly Corinthos, Robert Scorpio, and Holly Sutton-Scorpio; Adoptive granddaughter of Sonny Corinthos. Goddaughter of Jason Morgan and Felicia Scorpio. Part of the Quartermaine family, Scorpio family, Spencer family, and Corinthos family.

=== Sasha Gilmore ===
(Sofia Mattsson, 2018–25)
(Helena Mattsson, 2022)

Daughter of Robert Scorpio and Holly Sutton-Scorpio, and sister of Robin Scorpio and Ethan Lovett. Hired by Valentin Cassadine to impersonate Nina Reeves' long-presumed dead daughter. Model for and part-owner of Deception. Mother of Liam Corbin and Daisy Gilmore. Widow of the late Brando Corbin.

=== Marcus Godfrey ===
(Nigel Gibbs, 2018–)

Husband of Yvonne Godfrey. Former love of Stella Henry.

=== Yvonne Godfrey ===
(Janet Hubert, 2018–20)

Wife of Marcus Godfrey. Suffering from Alzheimer's.

=== Alice Grant (deceased) ===
(Camilla Ashland, 1976–77)
(Lieux Dressler, 1978–83)

Mother of Heather Webber, aunt of Susan Moore, and grandmother of Steven Webber, Franco Baldwin, and Esme Prince. Housekeeper for Lesley and Rick Webber. Murders Diana Taylor to keep Diana from killing her daughter Heather. Dies of a cerebral hemorrhage.

=== David Gray (deceased) ===
(Paul Rosilli, 1981–82)

Wants to steal the treasures of Malcuth. Hypnotizes Laura Spencer and sends her out to sea, where the Cassadines later capture her. Eventually killed by Luke Spencer.

=== Fred Gray ===
(Christian Malmin, 2016–17)

=== Florence Grey ===
(Anne Collings, 1973–74)
(Annie Abbott, 2020–21)

Wife of Gordon Grey. Mother of Martin Grey and Cyrus Renault.

=== Gordon Bradford Grey (deceased) ===
(Sherman Howard, 1973–74)
(Eric Server, 1974)

Professor who had an affair with Lesley Webber, his student, resulting in the birth of their daughter, Laura Collins. Husband of Florence Grey. Father of Martin Grey and Cyrus Renault. Revealed to have been killed by Cyrus, as a teenager, because of Gordon's abusive nature.

=== Martin Grey ===
(Michael E. Knight, 2019–)

Nelle's former attorney. Currently working as Valentin's attorney. Brother of Cyrus Renault. Half-brother of Laura Collins; Son of Gordon and Florence Grey.

=== Carla Greco ===
(Laura Harring, 1990–91)

Shoots and kills Rico Chacone in self-defense in 1990. Had been formerly engaged to Rico and was brutally beaten by him. Has a brother named Frankie and is friends with Colton Shore.

=== Frankie Greco ===
(Robert Fontaine, 1990–91)

Has a sister named Carla and is friends with Colton Shore, Decker and Dawn. Works at Body Heat and is a photographer.

=== Greg ===
(Ken Lally, 2002–03)

=== Alice Gunderson ===
(Bergen Williams, 2001–15)

Maid for the Quartermaine family. Devoted to Luke Spencer. Also works as a professional wrestler during her free time; her stage name is "The Dominator". 5% Shareholder of ELQ.

== H ==
=== Edna Hadley ===
(Lesley Woods, 1977–78, 1980)

Edna was the New York landlady who arranged for Heather Webber to sell her baby, Steven Lars.

=== Richard Halifax ===
(Randolph Mantooth, 1992–93)

Enemy of Bill Eckert.

=== David Hamilton (deceased) ===
(Jerry Ayres, 1977–78)

Dated Laura Spencer, who accidentally killed him after he rejected her. Previously made advances to Laura's mother, Lesley Webber.

=== Nora Hanen ===
(Hillary B. Smith, 2017, 2019)

Attorney from Llanview.

=== John Hanley (deceased) ===
(Lee Mathis, 1994–96)

AIDS patient who spoke at the 1995 Nurses' Ball. Became friends with Lucy Coe, Stone Cates, Robin Scorpio and many other residents.

=== Audrey March Hardy ===
(Rachel Ames, 1964–2007, 2009, 2013, 2015)
(Maura McGiveney, temp. 1971)

Mother of Tom Hardy Grandmother to Tommy Hardy. Step-grandmother of Elizabeth, Sarah, Steven Lars Webber and Hayden Barnes. Sister of Lucille March. Widow of Steve Hardy. Was married to Dr. Tom Baldwin, brother of Lee Baldwin.

=== Simone Ravelle Hardy ===
(Laura Carrington, 1987–89)
(Stephanie E. Williams, 1990–93)
(Felecia Bell, 1993–96)

Pediatrician. Ex-wife of Tom Hardy

=== Steve Hardy (deceased) ===
(John Beradino, 1963–96)
(Jason Thompson, 2015)

Father of Jeff Webber. Grandfather of Elizabeth, Sarah, and Steven Webber and Hayden Barnes. Husband of Audrey March Hardy.

=== Tom Hardy (born as Thomas Baldwin Jr.) ===
(Christine Cahill, 1971–74)
(David Comfort, 1977–81)
(Bradley Green, 1981–82)
(David Walker, 1982–84)
(David Wallace, 1987–93)
(Matthew Ashford, 1995–97)

Biological son of Thomas Baldwin and Audrey March Hardy. Adoptive son of Dr. Steve Hardy. Nephew of Lee and Gail Baldwin. Cousin of Scott Baldwin. Ex-husband of Dr. Simone Ravelle Hardy.

=== Tommy Hardy ===
(Catherine and Noelle Paige, 1989–92)
(Christian Michel and Jean-Paul Rene Piette, 1992–93)
(Zachary Ellington Jr., 1994–97)

Son of Tom Hardy and Simone Ravelle Hardy.

=== David Harper ===
(Jay Pickett, 2007–08)

Detective at Port Charles Police Department. Brought in to help investigate the Corinthos/Zacchara mob war.

=== Maureen Harper ===
(Christie Lynn Smith, 2007, December 22, 2008)

Guest on Sam McCall's former show Everyday Heroes. Kidnapped Jacob Spencer.

=== Peter Harrell (deceased) ===
(Judson Scott, 1984–85)
(David Gautreaux, 2014)

Former fiancé of Felicia Cummings. Father of Peter Harrell Jr. Attempted to acquire the Aztec Jewels. Presumed dead until 2014, when he was revealed to be alive. Died after being shot in the back by Nathan West.

=== Peter Harrell Jr. (deceased) ===
(Zachary Garred, 2014)

Son of Peter Harrell. Attempted to marry Maxie Jones, the daughter of Felicia Cummings, in order to acquire the Aztec Jewels. Used the alias of Levi Dunkleman. Revealed to be working for Victor Cassadine. Died when being stabbed in the back by Maxie.

=== Jim Harvey (deceased) ===
(Greg Evigan, 2018)

Businessman of Niagara Equities who came to Port Charles after Janice Lomax's resignation as mayor and was in an attempt to follow the former mayor's idea of Charles Street redevelopment project but failed because of the earthquake after the deaths of Cesar Faison and Nathan West. Dated Betsy Frank. Shot and killed by Drew Cain.

=== Abby Haver (deceased) ===
(Andrea Bogart, 2010–11)

Friend of Sam McCall. Dated Michael Corinthos. Formerly worked as a stripper under the name Candy and attended college part-time to become a paralegal. Clashed with Carly over Michael. Died after being struck in the head by construction debris in Chicago.

=== Bryce Hawthorne ===
(Chad W. Smathers, 2010–11)

Best friend of Kiefer Bauer. Classmate of Kristina Davis and Michael Corinthos. Bullied and harassed both Kristina and Michael after Kiefer's death.

=== Logan Hayes (deceased) ===
(Josh Duhon, 2007–08)

Veteran of the Iraq War. Illegitimate son of Scott Baldwin and Jacqueline Hayes. Brother of Robert "Franco" Frank, Karen Wexler, Serena Baldwin, and Christina Baldwin. Killed by Lulu Spencer in self-defense after an ill-fated romance.

=== Stella Henry ===
(Vernee Watson-Johnson, 2017–)

Aunt of Curtis Ashford.

=== James Hobart (deceased) ===
(James B. Sikking, 1973–76)

Doctor at General Hospital, briefly marries Audrey March Hardy. Alcoholic.

=== Theo Hoffman (also known as The Balkan) (deceased) ===
(Daniel Benzali, 2010–11)

Brenda Barrett's defense attorney. Father of the deceased Aleksander Janáček, whom Brenda accidentally killed. His secret alias was "The Balkan", and he worked as an international criminal dealing in drugs and the exploitation of women and children. Married to Suzanne Stanwyck. Killed by Suzanne before he had the chance to meet his grandson, Alec.

=== Summer Holloway (deceased) ===
(Brittney Powell, 2002–03)

Killed by Stefan Cassadine. Friend of Luke Spencer and lover of Lucky Spencer.

=== Jessica Holmes (deceased) ===
(Starr Andreeff, 1991–93)

Ex-assistant district attorney. Had an affair with Sean Donely and became pregnant with his child. Murdered by Ryan Chamberlain but both Sean Donely and Tiffany Hill were suspected of committing the crime.

=== Ted Holmes (deceased) ===
(David Doyle, 1986–87)

Lawyer to Jennifer Talbot. Murdered by Sarah, Earl Moody's housekeeper.

=== Teddy Holmes ===
(James Westmoreland, 1972)
(John Gabriel, 1972–73)

Boarder living with Jessie Brewer at the same time with Jessie's niece and nephew Caroline and Kent Murray. Attempted to seduce Caroline for her money.

=== Austin Gatlin Holt (deceased) ===
(Roger Howarth, 2021–23)

Son of Jimmy Lee Holt and Charity Gatlin. Part of the Quartermaine family.

=== Charity Gatlin Holt ===
(Gloria Carlin, 1986)

Widow of Jimmy Lee Holt. Initially fell for "Simon", Alan Quartermaine's alias while faking his death and amnesia. When he was forced to return home, she followed and fell for his half-brother. Mother of Jonah Gatlin and Austin Gatlin-Holt.

=== Jimmy Lee Holt (deceased) ===
(Steve Bond, 1983–87)

Born Eric Quartermaine. Illegitimate son of Edward Quartermaine and Beatrice LeSeur. Part of the Quartermaine family. His best friend was Dr. Buzz Stryker. Ex-husband of Celia Quartermaine. Husband of Charity Gatlin. Father of Austin Gatlin Holt. Revealed to have been disinherited by Edward in 2013. Died offscreen between 2020 and 2021.

=== Paul Hornsby ===
(Paul Satterfield, 1991–94)
(Richard Burgi, 2015–16)

Father of Dillon Quartermaine, Susan Hornsby, and Paul Hornsby Jr. Ex-husband of Tracy Quartermaine and Jenny Eckert. Former district attorney.

=== Paul Hornsby Jr. ===
(mentioned character)

Son of Paul Hornsby and Jenny Eckert. Paternal half-brother of Dillon Quartermaine and Susan Hornsby.

=== Susan Hornsby ===
(Irina Cashen, 1991; Alina Patra, 2016)

Daughter of Paul Hornsby. Paternal half-sister to Dillon Quartermaine and Paul Hornsby Jr.

=== Katherine Hardwicke "Kate" Howard (deceased) ===
(Megan Ward, 2007–10, 2018, 2020)
(Kelly Sullivan, 2011–14)

Born Constanza Louise "Connie" Falconeri. Had a childhood romance with Sonny Corinthos back in Bensonhurst. Raped by Joe Scully Jr. as a teenager; as a result, biological mother of Trey Mitchell. Editor-in-chief of Crimson Magazine. Co-owner of the Metro Court Hotel with Carly Jacks. Cousin of Olivia Falconeri and Dante Falconeri. Ex-lover of Jasper Jacks and Coleman Ratcliffe. Ex-wife of Johnny Zacchara as her split personality Connie Falconeri. Was engaged to Sonny. Shot and Killed by Ava Jerome.

=== Brianna Hughes (deceased) ===
(Kathryn Condidorio, 2009)

Mistress of Port Charles Mayor Garrett "Prescott" Floyd. Allegedly slipped and fell in the shower at the Metro Court. Died in a surgery conducted by Matt Hunter.

=== Donna Hunter ===
(Mentioned character)

Mother of Matt Hunter through an affair with Noah Drake.

=== Matt Hunter ===
(Jason Cook, 2008–12)

Son of Noah Drake and Donna Hunter. Brother of Patrick Drake. Uncle of Emma Grace Scorpio-Drake. Resident doctor at General Hospital. Ex-husband of Maxie Jones. Went to prison for five years for the murder of Lisa Niles.

=== Iona Huntington ===
(Janis Paige, 1989–90)

Aunt to Katherine Delafield. When Ned Ashton bought an old, abandoned house on Spoon Island, Iona returned to Port Charles because she realized that, long ago, she had hidden plates for an old counterfeiting machine within the house. She broke into the house, stole back the counterfeiting plates and, not being able to resist temptation, began printing phony five-dollar bills in Katherine's home. She later had open-heart surgery and received the much younger heart of the recently deceased David McAllister.

=== Jefferson Smith Hutchins (also known as Hutch) ===
(Rick Moses, 1979–80)

Henchman of Frank Smith who, originally ordered to get rid of Luke and Laura, became friends with them. Worked with Luke and Laura at Mom and Pop Calhoun's Diner and lived with them on the Whitakers' farm. Pretended to help Luke and Laura search for the Left-Handed Boy but was instead after Frank Smith's gold.

== I ==
=== Mary Pat Ingles (deceased) ===
(Patricia Bethune, 2018)

Psychiatric nurse. Tormented Carly Corinthos. Killed by Ryan Chamberlain.

=== Pete Inglis ===
(Guy Nardulli 2004–05)

=== Eric Ingstrom ===
(John Ericson, 1987)

Husband of Greta Ingstrom. After a plane crash and believed to be dead, was found being held hostage on the Biscayne Islands. Rescued by Robert Scorpio, Anna Devane, and Sean Donely, with Monica Quartermaine, Duke Lavery and Camellia McKay tagging along.

=== Greta Ingstrom ===
(Kristina Wayborn, 1987)

Scientist. Fell for Sean Donely while she believed her husband was dead. Reunited with husband, Eric Ingstrom. Was almost killed on several occasions by her co-worker Malcolm. Friends with her assistant Connie and Monica Quartermaine.

=== Irina (deceased) ===
(Olga Vilner, 2007)

Ex-girlfriend of Jerry Jacks (deceased). Raped Jasper Jacks. Threatened Carly Corinthos. Shot and killed by Jerry Jacks.

=== Irving ===
(Anthony De Longis, 1984)

=== Kalup Ishamel ===
(Kalup Linzy, 2010)

Performer. Helped Franco in his schemes.

=== Anton Ivanov ===
(Maksim Chmerkovskiy, 2013)

Introduced as handyman for the Metro Court hotel. Revealed as a dancer who helps choreograph the 2013 Nurses' Ball performances.

== J ==
=== Jane Jacks (deceased) ===
(Barbara Tarbuck, 1996–2000, 2002–07, 2009–10)

Mother of Jasper Jacks and Jerry Jacks. Widow of John Jacks. Grandmother of Josslyn Jacks and Jude Jacks. Great-grandmother of Phoebe Chase. Died peacefully in her sleep offscreen in April 2017 (Barbara Tarbuck had died in December 2016).

=== Jasper "Jax" Jacks ===
(Ingo Rademacher, 1996–2013, 2016–17, 2019–21)
(Gideon Emery, temp. 2008)

Australian business tycoon. Son of John and Jane Jacks. Brother of Jerry Jacks. Father of Josslyn Jacks. Uncle of Jude Jacks. Ex-husband of Miranda Jameson, Alexis Davis, Courtney Matthews, Skye Chandler Quartermaine and Carly Corinthos. Once engaged to Brenda Barrett. Longtime nemesis of Sonny Corinthos. Corporate raider Running Aurora print media.

=== Jerry Jacks ===
(Julian Stone, 1998–99)
(Sebastian Roché, 2007–10, 2012–15)

International criminal. Also known as James Craig and James Brosnan, he is responsible for the Metro Court Hotel hostage crisis in February 2007 in revenge for Ryan Chamberlain gaining Port Charles Mayor Garrett Floyd, commissioner Mac Scorpio, district attorney Ric Lansing as his new enemies making Sonny's children Michael, Morgan, and Kristina scared and later became traumatized in the aftermath. Son of John and Jane Jacks. Brother of Jasper Jacks. Once engaged to Bobbie Spencer. Briefly dates Alexis Davis. Presumed dead many times. Sent to prison by Anna Devane and Robert Scorpio for kidnapping and trying to kill their daughter, Robin Scorpio after his new henchman and district attorney Paul Hornsby disabled Sonny Corinthos. Recently discovered that he escaped Steinmauer prison. In 2026, it was discovered that he is the father of Jude Jacks and the grandfather of Jude's daughter, Phoebe Chase, who was adopted by Brook Lynn Quartermaine and Harrison Chase.

=== John Jacks (deceased) ===
(Peter Renaday, 1996–2000, 2002–03, 2012)

Father of Jasper and Jerry Jacks. Husband of Jane Jacks. Grandfather of Josslyn Jacks and Jude Jacks. Great-grandfather of Phoebe Chase. Murdered by Ewen Keenan.

=== Josslyn Jacks ===
(Jamie Lea Willett, 2009)
(McKenna and Karleigh Larson, 2009–12)
(Sarah Johnson, 2012–13)
(Paige Olivier, 2013)
(Hannah Nordberg, 2014–15)
(Eden McCoy, 2015–)

Daughter of Carly Corinthos and Jasper Jacks. Part of the Spencer family. Maternal half-sister of Michael Corinthos, Morgan Corinthos and Donna Corinthos. Currently in a relationship with Dex Heller.

=== Jude Jacks ===
(Wil Traval, 2026)

Son of Jerry Jacks. Comes to Port Charles in 2026 to claim his daughter Phoebe, who was adopted by Brook Lynn Quartermaine and her ex-husband Harrison Chase.

=== Elizabeth Jackson ===
(Joan Pringle, 1994)

Elizabeth is the former secretary of Bradley Ward. In the early 1970s, Elizabeth and Bradley have an extramarital affair that Lee Baldwin, Jack Boland and Edward Quartermaine used to blackmail Bradley.

=== Eric "Edge" Jackson (deceased) ===
(Mark St. James, 1990–91)

Con artist and filmmaker. Murders Dawn Winthrop and frames Decker Moss for her murder. Impersonates Evan Jerome Jr., but Anna Devane and Jerome family lawyer Broxton prove that he is a fraud. Later killed by German bootleggers whom he doublecrossed.

=== Terrell Jackson ===
(Khary Payton, 2011)

Pediatrician at General Hospital with an unknown past with Lisa Niles. Tries to seduce Robin Scorpio as part of a scheme concocted by Lisa. Operates on Josslyn Jacks, saving her life.

=== Jake ===
(Stella Stevens, 1996–99)

Owner of Jake's Bar for a while. Allows Jason Morgan to live upstairs when he moves out of the Quartermaine mansion in 1996.

=== Miranda Jameson ===
(Leslie Horan, 1996–97)

Previously married to Jasper Jacks and presumed dead after an explosion, but actually hidden by John Jacks. Friend of Katherine Bell. Leaves Port Charles to rebuild her life.

=== Cal Jamison ===
(Larry Block, 1978)

Mobster. Has a fling with Bobbie Spencer, who pays him to conceal the secrets of her past. Reveals that Steven Lars Webber is alive.

=== Aleksander Janáček (deceased) ===
(Antonie Knoppers, 2010)

Son of Theo Hoffman and Suzanne Stanwyck. Lover of Brenda Barrett and father of Alec Barrett. Works in organized crime. Killed by Brenda after he becomes obsessed with her and attacks her bodyguard Dante Falconeri.

=== Ross Janelle ===
(Tony Dow, 1974–75)

Police officer investigating Phil Brewer's murder. Briefly dates Nurse Beth Maynard, sister of Diana Maynard Taylor.

=== Javier ===
(Kurt Caceres, 2011)

Owner of a bordello in Jacksonville, Florida. Hires Lulu Spencer as a waitress when she is in Jacksonville looking for her father Luke. Associate of Luke Spencer. Has a crush on Lulu. Kills Lupe and says that she died in the shower.

=== Jennings ===
(Frank Killmond, 1984–92)

Butler for the Quartermaine family. Previously a gardener prior to being promoted by Monica. Uncle of Reginald Jennings.

=== Reginald Jennings ===
(Stephen Kay, 1992–2003)

Butler for the Quartermaine family. Nephew of their previous butler Jennings. Dates the Corinthos' nanny, Leticia Juarez. Poisons Katherine Bell. Locks Luke Spencer and Felicia Jones in the Quartermaine crypt.

=== Dara Jensen ===
(Vanita Harbour, 1996–2003, 2005)

Prosecutor. Cousin of Jamal Woods and Hope Hartman. Dates Justus Ward and Marcus Taggert.

=== Ava Jerome ===
(Maura West, 2013–)

Daughter of Victor Jerome & Delia Ryan; sister of Julian Jerome, Olivia St. John, Dino Antoinelli and Evan Jerome, Sr (deceased). Mother of Kiki Jerome (deceased), and Avery Corinthos. Stepmother of Spencer Cassadine. Runs an art gallery. Lover of martinis. Object of Ryan Chamberlain's obsession. Currently married to Nikolas Cassadine.

=== Evan Jerome Jr. (deceased) ===
(mentioned character)

Drug addict son of Evan Jerome and his wife Veronica. Once worked for Eric "Edge" Jackson. From 1990 to 1991, Edge impersonated Evan Jr. to get his inheritance from the Jerome family. Later revealed to have died in a car accident.

=== Evan Jerome Sr. (deceased) ===
(mentioned character)

Son of Victor Jerome. Brother of Julian Jerome, Olivia St. John, Dino Antoinelli and Ava Jerome. Husband of Veronica and father of Evan Jerome Jr. In 1983, Evan raped Camellia McKay and she killed him in self defense; Duke Lavery covers up his murder, which was the "secret of L'Orlean."

=== Julian Jerome (Deceased) ===
(Jason Culp, 1988–90)
(William deVry, 2013–20)

Son of mob boss Victor Jerome. Paternal half-brother of Olivia St. John, Evan Jerome Sr., Dino Antoinelli and Ava Jerome. Ex-husband of Alexis Davis. Biological father of Lucas Jones, Sam McCall, and Leo Falconeri. Presumed dead for almost over 20 years. Died after being shot by a man sent by Cyrus Renault and then shot again in a fight with Sonny Corinthos. He died and fell after a bridge collapsed after dying of two gun shot wounds. His body was recovered by the authorities.

=== Lauren "Kiki" Katherine Jerome (deceased) ===
(Kristen Alderson, 2013–15)
(Hayley Erin, 2015–19)

Daughter of Ava Jerome. Originally believed to be the daughter of Robert "Franco" Frank, but revealed to be the biological daughter of Silas Clay. Ex-wife of Morgan Corinthos. Killed by Ryan Chamberlain.

=== Victor Jerome (deceased) ===
(Jack Axelrod, 1987–89)

One of the most powerful mob bosses of Port Charles. Father of Julian Jerome, Olivia St. John, Evan Jerome Sr., Dino Antoinelli and Ava Jerome. Chokes on a pendant after being rebuffed by Lucy Coe and thrown in the water.

=== Hector Jerrold ===
(Booth Colman, 1983)

Professor

=== Amelia Joffe ===
(Annie Wersching, 2007)
(Darby Stanchfield, temp 2007)

Television producer of Everyday Heroes. Comes to town to get revenge on Sam McCall for murdering her father. Has a fling with Sonny Corinthos. Assists Jason Morgan in saving Jake Spencer when he is kidnapped.

=== Epiphany Johnson (deceased) ===
(Sonya Eddy, 2006–2023)

Head nurse at General Hospital. Mother of Stan Johnson. Died of a heart attack (Sonya Eddy died in 2022).

=== Stan Johnson (deceased) ===
(Gomez Warren, 2003–06)
(Karim Prince, 2006)
(Kiko Ellsworth, 2007)

Computer expert. Son of Epiphany Johnson. Employee of Sonny Corinthos and Jason Morgan. Killed in 2008 by Manny Ruiz while in Florida on business.

=== Andrew "Frisco" Jones ===
(Jack Wagner, 1984–91, 1994–95, 2013)
(Kevin Bernhardt, 1985)

Head of the World Security Bureau. Freelance adventurer. Former police officer. Former lead singer of the rock n' roll band "Blackie and the Riff-Raff". Ex-husband of Felicia Jones. Father of Georgie and Maxie Jones. Brother of Tony Jones. Part of the Scorpio/Jones family.

=== Anthony "Tony" Jones (deceased) ===
(Brad Maule, 1984–2006, 2019)

Neurologist at General Hospital. Widower of Tania Roskov; Ex-husband of Lucy Coe and Bobbie Spencer. Father of B. J. Jones; adoptive father of Lucas Jones. Dies during the encephalitis outbreak in 2006.

=== B.J. Jones (deceased) ===
(Brighton Hertford, 1986–94, 2024)
(Kirsten Storms, 2009 (in a dream))

Daughter of Tony Jones and Tania Roskov. Adoptive daughter of Bobbie Spencer. Adoptive sister of Carly Corinthos and Lucas Jones. Dies when her school bus is hit by a drunk driver, and her heart is donated to her cousin Maxie Jones.

=== Debrah Jones (deceased) ===
(mentioned character)

Murdered might be a victim of Ryan Chamberlain.

=== Felicia Scorpio ===
(Kristina Wagner, 1984–2005, 2007–08, 2012—)
(Sandra Ferguson, 2005)

Aztec Princess. Wife of Mac Scorpio. Ex-wife of Frisco Jones and Colton Shore. Mother of Maxie Jones and Georgie Jones. Grandmother of Georgie Spinelli, James West, and Bailey Louise Jones.

=== Georgie Jones (deceased) ===
(Alana and Marina Norwood, 1995)
(Ryan and Caitlin Cohen, 1995)
(Caroline and Elizabeth van Heil, 1996)
(Breck Bruns, 1997–2002)
(Lindze Letherman, 2002–07, 2010, 2013, 2018)

Daughter of Frisco Jones and Felicia Jones. Stepdaughter of Mac Scorpio. Younger sister of Maxie Jones. Ex-wife of Dillon Quartermaine. Has a crush on Damian Spinelli. Murdered by Diego Alcazar. Has returned as a ghost on several different occasions.

=== Lucas Jones ===
(Nicholas Moody, 1989)
(Kevin and Christopher Graves, 1990)
Unknown (1990–92)
(Kevin and Chuckie Gravino, 1992–94)
(Jay Sacane, 1994–96)
(Justin Cooper, 1996–98)
(Logan O'Brien, 1998–2001)
(J. Evan Bonifant, 2002)
(C.J. Thomason, 2002–03)
(Ryan Carnes, 2004–05, 2014–20)
(Ben Hogestyn, 2005–06)
(Matt Trudeau, 2020–)

Biological son of Julian Jerome and Cheryl Stansbury. Adoptive son of Tony Jones and Bobbie Spencer. Biological paternal half-brother of Sam McCall and Leo Falconeri. Adoptive brother of Carly Corinthos and B.J. Jones. Discloses his homosexuality to his parents. Ex-husband of Brad Cooper. Adoptive father of Wiley Cooper-Jones before it was revealed that Wiley was Michael and Nelle's Son.

=== Maxie Jones ===
(Chelsey and Kahley Cuff, 1990–91)
(Ashley and Jessica Clark, 1992)
(Elaine and Melanie Silver, 1992–93)
(Robyn Richards, 1993–2004)
(Danica Stewart, 2002)
(Kirsten Storms, 2005–2026)
(Jen Lilley, 2011–12)
(Molly Burnett, temp. 2016, 2018)

Born Mariah Maximilliana "Maxie" Jones; daughter of Frisco Jones and Felicia Jones. Step-daughter of Mac Scorpio. Older sister of Georgie Jones. Mother of Georgie Spinelli, James West and Bailey Louise Jones. wife of Nathan West; Ex-wife of Matt Hunter. Ex fiancé of Peter August.

=== Slick Jones ===
(Eddie Ryder, 1981–83)

Friend of Luke and Laura, Robert Scorpio, Tiffany Hill, and Emma Lutz. Helps Luke when he is looking for the Ice Princess treasures and with the opening of the Haunted Star.

=== Tania Roskov Jones (deceased) ===
(Hilary Edson, 1984–87)

Speech therapist at General Hospital. Mother of B. J. Jones. Wife of Tony Jones. Killed by a hit-and-run driver.

=== Joonie ===
(Dea Vise, 2001)

Woman drinking and chatting with Lucky in a bar who helps Lucky get back on track in his hunt for Luke.

=== Leticia Juarez (deceased) ===
(Christine Carlo, 1998–2006)
(Jessi Morales, 2006–07)

Nanny of Michael and Morgan Corinthos. Dates Reginald Jennings. First victim of the Text Message Killer, (Diego Alcazar), in September 2007.

=== Mercedes Juarez ===
(Chrissie Fit, 2007–11)

Nanny of Michael and Morgan Corinthos, later nanny of Emma Drake. Cousin of Leticia Juarez and a maid at the Metro Court.

=== Dr. Leo Julian ===
(Dominic Rains, 2007–08)

=== JT (deceased) ===
(Greg Cipes, 2011)

Drug dealer working for Anthony Zacchara. Drugs Lucky Spencer. Dies in a shootout caused by Johnny Zacchara.

== K ==
=== Lydia Karenin ===
(Jessica Ferrarone, 2003)
(J. Robin Miller, 2003)

Socialite who is briefly married to Nikolas Cassadine. Runs away with A. J. Quartermaine.

=== Andrei Karpov (deceased) ===
(Ilia Volok, 2008)

Eastern European mafia leader seeking an alliance with Sonny Corinthos so he can put several operations into motion in Port Charles. Shot multiple times and killed by Sonny.

=== Peter Kaufman ===
(Eugene Robert Glazer, 1992)

=== Dr. Ewen Keenan (deceased) ===
(Nathin Butler, 2011–12)

Psychiatrist at Shadybrook Sanitarium and General Hospital. Counsels Elizabeth Webber and helps Shawn Butler with his post-traumatic stress disorder. Treats Kate Howard with her dissociative identity disorder. Dates Elizabeth Webber. Holds Robin Scorpio captive while working for Jerry Jacks, who blackmails him due to his long history with the Jacks family. He dies after being shot by Jason Morgan as Jason is saving Elizabeth Webber from Ewen after Ewen kidnaped Elizabeth.

=== Joe Kelly ===
(Doug Sheehan, 1978–83)

Private detective turned lawyer who investigates Diana Taylor's murder. Stepson of Rose Kelly. Romantic feelings for virginal Ann Logan.

=== Paddy Kelly (deceased) ===
(Frank Parker, 1980)

Husband to Rose Kelly and father of Joe Kelly. Murdered by the mob in Port Charles.

=== Rose Kelly ===
(Loanne Bishop, 1980–84)

Original owner of Kelly's Diner. Husband Paddy Kelly is killed by the mob. Stepmother of Joe Kelly and foster mother of Lou Swenson. Gets involved with Jake Meyer.

=== Jack Kensington Jr. ===
(Michael Stadvec, 1992)

Son of Jack Kensington Sr..

=== Jack Kensington Sr. ===
(Stan Ivar, 1992)

Senator. Father of Jack Kensington Jr..

=== Cassius Kibideaux ===
(Reign Morton, 2007–08)

Orderly at General Hospital. Helps Epiphany Johnson cope with her son's death and subsequent heart attack.

=== Albert Kim ===
(Kurt Yue, 2023)
(Ryan Moriarty, 2023)

Judge

=== Warren Kirk ===
(Christopher Cousins, 2020)
(Jamison Jones, 2020)

=== Richard Klein ===
(Gene Farber, 2017)

=== Rafe Kovich Jr. (deceased) ===
(Jimmy Deshler, 2013–14)

Son of Rafe Kovich Sr and Allison Barrington. Friends with Molly Lansing. Involved in a car crash that caused him to go brain dead.

=== Kris ===
(Ken Foree, 1992)

== L ==
=== David Langton (deceased) ===
(Jeff Pomerantz, 1992)

Father of Dawn Winthrop, with Monica Quartermaine, and Nicki Langton, with Penelope Adler. A humanitarian and Vietnam veteran; dies of a heart attack.

=== Nikki Langton ===
(Camille Cooper, 1992–93)

Daughter of David Langton and Penelope Adler. Sues Monica Quartermaine for malpractice as revenge for her father's death. Engaged to A. J. Quartermaine but paid by Alan Quartermaine to leave town.

=== Gary Lansing ===
(Steve Carlson, 1977–79)

Doctor at General Hospital. Son of Dr. Steven Lansing. Nephew of Roy Lansing. Brother of Howard Lansing. Husband of Gina Dante-Lansing. Implied to be the grandfather of Ric during a conversation between Alexis Davis and Sonny Corinthos in 2005, but this has never been publicly confirmed.

=== Howard Lansing ===
(Richard Sarradet, 1978–81)

Attorney. Son of Dr. Steven Lansing. Nephew of Roy Lansing. Brother of Gary Lansing. Dates Lesley Webber while she is separated from Rick.

=== Molly Lansing ===
(Hope and Faith Dever, 2005–07)
(Iris and Ivy Kaim, 2008)
(Haley Pullos, 2009–23)
(Holiday Mia Kriegel, temp, 2023)
(Brooke Anne Smith, 2023)
(Kristen Vaganos, 2023–)

Daughter of Ric Lansing and Alexis Davis; part of the Cassadine family and Corinthos family. Half-sister of Sam McCall and Kristina Corinthos-Davis. Domestic partners with T. J. Ashford.

=== Richard "Ric" Lansing ===
(Rick Hearst, 2002–09, 2014–16, 2024–)
(Nick Kiriazis, temp. 2007)

Son of Trevor Lansing and Adela Corinthos. Maternal half-brother of Sonny Corinthos. Ex-husband of Elizabeth Webber, Alexis Davis. Father of Molly Lansing. Former district attorney who was also hostage negotiator in helping Mac Scorpio rescue hostages at the Metro Court Hotel in 2007 with help Mayor Garrett Floyd and the S.W.A.T. team.

=== Roy Lansing ===
(Robert Clarke, 1963)
(Liam Sullivan, 1963–64)

Part of the original cast, Roy is an unsuccessful novelist that dates Peggy Mercer after her engagement to Dr. Steve Hardy ends. Brother of Dr. Steven Lansing and uncle of Dr. Gary Lansing.

=== Steven Lansing ===
(Matthew S. Infante, 1963–65)

Doctor at General Hospital. Father of Dr. Gary Lansing.

=== Trevor Lansing (deceased) ===
(Stephen Macht, 2007–09)

Father of Ric Lansing, once engaged to Adela Corinthos. Grandfather of Molly Lansing. Attorney for Anthony Zacchara. Jumps to his death from the roof of General Hospital while fighting with Sam McCall over a biotoxin.

=== Duke Lavery (deceased) ===
(Ian Buchanan, 1986–89, 2012–17, 2020)
(Gregory Beecroft, 1990)

Reformed mobster. Husband of Anna Devane and stepfather to Robin Scorpio. Close friends with Angel Moran. Presumed dead in 1989. Presumed to return in 1990, later to be revealed an impostor. Revealed to be alive in 2012 and held captive by Cesar Faison, who impersonates him before going to prison. Went to work for Sonny Corinthos. Never knew he was father of Griffin Munro. Killed by Carlos Rivera, on orders from Julian Jerome.

=== Meg Lawson ===
(Alexia Robinson, 1990–94)
(Lisa Canning, 1994)

Nurse at General Hospital. Friend of Dawn Winthrop.

=== Sung Cho Lee ===
(James Hong, 1983)

=== Kelly Lee ===
(Gwendoline Yeo, 2006)
(Minae Noji, 2006–12, 2015–16)

Obstetrician at General Hospital. Roommates with Lainey Winters. Good friends with Robin Scorpio.

=== Sebastian Leeds ===
(Jason Connery, 2013)

=== Winnifred Leeds ===
(Senta Moses, 2009)

FBI agent whose first undercover assignment leads to the arrest of Damian Spinelli.

=== Beatrice LeSeur (deceased) ===
(Marcella Markham, 1984)

Has an affair with Edward Quartermaine which produces a son, Jimmy Lee Holt. Tries to blackmail Edward. Dies from an accidental overdose.

=== Cameron Lewis (deceased) ===
(Lane Davies, 2002–04)

Dies in 2004 after being struck by falling debris during the Port Charles Hotel fire. Father of Zander Smith. Grandfather of Cameron Spencer.

=== Ivy Lief ===
(Chase Masterson, 1994)

=== Christi Limg ===
(Christine Lozano, 2012–18)

=== Joey Limbo (deceased) ===
(Sal Landi, 2009)

Mafioso from Bensonhurst. Associate of Luke Spencer when he was in the mob. Killed by Franco.

=== Anne Logan ===
(Susan Pratt, 1978–82)

Nurse at General Hospital. Niece of Lucille March Weeks and Audrey March Hardy. Daughter of Edith and Lou Logan. Adoptive mother of Jeremy Hewitt Logan.

=== Jeremy Logan ===
(Philip Tanzini, 1978–82)

Adoptive son of Anne Logan. Revealed to be the carrier of Lassa Fever which resulted in hospital quarantined.

=== Janice Lomax ===
(Saidah Arrika Ekulona, 2012–15)
(Shari Belafonte, 2016–17)

Mayor of Port Charles, New York. Succeeded Garret Floyd as mayor. Hired Anna Devane as police commissioner in 2012. Resigned as mayor in 2017.

=== Priscilla Longworth ===
(Allison Hayes, 1963–64)

Part of the original cast, Priscilla is the daughter of the chairman of the hospital board. She briefly dates Dr. Steve Hardy.

=== Victor Lord Jr. ===
(Trevor St. John, mentioned character)

Identical twin brother of Todd Manning. Husband of Tea Delgado. Father of Sam Manning. Father of Tea Delgado's stillborn son, Victor Lord III. Was brainwashed and went through plastic surgery to pose as "Todd Manning" for eight years while Todd was held captive. Shot and supposedly killed by Todd as revenge.

=== Victor Lord III (deceased) ===
(mentioned character, 2012)

Son of Victor Lord Jr. and Téa Delgado. He was stillborn on June 1, 2012. He was switched at birth with Danny Morgan, and buried next to Lila McCall. When the switch was revealed, Téa mourned her son's death.

=== Eli Love ===
(Rick Springfield, 2007–08)

Rock star who bore striking resemblance to Dr. Noah Drake. Was a patient at General Hospital. Ex-lover of Anna Devane.

=== Esther Love ===
(Roz Ryan, 2012)

=== Reverend Winston Love ===
(Reginald VelJohnson, 2012)

=== Ethan Lovett ===
(Nathan Parsons, 2009–13, 2015, 2020, since 2026)
(James Ryan, 2023)

Son of Luke Spencer and Holly Sutton. Half-brother of Sasha Gilmore. Father of Phoebe Wilson. Part of the Spencer family. Adopted by Frank and Nancy Lovett. Grew up in Australia, and later became a conman. Ex-husband of Maya Ward. Left town to escape from Helena Cassadine.

=== Richard Lowe ===
(Scott Takeda, 2019–21)

Judge

=== Brandon Lowell (deceased) ===
(Ross Thomas, 2011)

Abusive ex-boyfriend of Abby Haver. Beaten up by Michael Corinthos and arrested by Dante Falconeri, but eventually released after Anthony Zacchara arranges to set him free. Brandon continues to beat up Abby and threaten Michael until Anthony hires a hit woman to kill him and frame Abby.

=== Peggy Lowell ===
(Deanna Lund, 1976)

=== Lupe (deceased) ===
(Priscilla Garita, 2011)

Prostitute working for Javier at the bordello, who keeps Luke Spencer company when he visits. Warns Lulu Spencer about Javier. Murdered by Javier for helping Lulu.

=== Charlie Lutz ===
(Ken Smolka, 1981)

Cab driver married to Emma Lutz. Responsible for stealing many things, including the Ice Princess. Charlie gives the Ice Princess to his wife Emma, who then gives it to Luke Spencer. Angered, Charlie steals it again and frames Luke.

=== Emma Lutz ===
(Merrie Lynn Ross, 1981–84)

Wife of Charlie Lutz. Friends with Lila Quartermaine.

=== Huxley Lynch ===
(Trent Dawson, 2016–17)

Shady art dealer who kidnapped Ava Jerome and Nikolas Cassadine to get a piece of artwork.

== M ==
=== Andre Maddox ===
(Anthony Montgomery, 2015–19, 2022)

Psychiatrist at General Hospital. Previously involved with the WSB as an undercover agent. Had a brief relationship with Jordan Ashford. Invented the memory-mapping technology that made Andrew Cain believe he was Jason. Revealed the truth when the real Jason returned. Maddox was arrested and sent to prison.

=== Madison ===
(Virginia Ma, 2024)

Assistant for Nina Reeves at Crimson Magazine.

=== Brett Madison ===
(James Horan, 1985–87)

=== Claudio Maldonado ===
(Sky Dumont, 1989)

Involved in Domino story, wanting to kill Frisco. Flirted with Anna Lavery and Katharine Delafield, making Robert Scorpio jealous.

=== Dolores Maloney ===
(Andi Chapman, 2020)

Sam McCall's former parole officer.

=== Starr Manning ===
(Kristen Alderson, 2012–13)

Former One Life to Live character. Daughter of Todd Manning and Blair Cramer. Part of the Lord family. Mother of Hope Manning Thornhart. Former co-owner of the Haunted Star with Lulu Spencer. Dated Michael Corinthos.

=== Todd Manning ===
(Roger Howarth, 2012–13)

Former One Life to Live character. Part of the Lord family. Identical twin brother of Victor Lord Jr. Ex-husband of Blair Cramer and Téa Delgado. Father of Starr Manning, Jack Manning, and Danielle Manning. Was held captive for eight years, while his brother Victor took his place. Owner of the newspaper, The Port Charles Sun.

=== Alex Marick (deceased) ===
(Finola Hughes, 2017, 2019–21)

Twin of Anna Devane. Revealed to actually be the mother of Peter August. Killed by Anna Devane after getting shot and falling off the Haunted Star.

=== Jeanette Marino ===
(Ely Pouget, 2018)

Vincent Marino's wife. Mother to Margaux Dawson.

=== Vincent Marino (deceased) ===
(Rick Pasqualone, 2018)

Mob Boss Joe Scully's Lawyer. Father to Margaux Dawson. Body found in the foundation of Charlie's Pub.

=== Pete Marquez ===
(Eddie Matos, 2006–07)

Professor at Port Charles University. Good friends with Dr. Patrick Drake.

=== Reese Marshall (deceased) ===
(Kari Wuhrer, 2005)

Born Charlotte "Carly" Roberts. FBI agent who investigated the kidnapping of Sonny Corinthos' children in 2005. Was revealed to be Charlotte Roberts, Carly Corinthos' childhood best friend who was presumed dead in a car accident and whose name Carly used when she first came to Port Charles. Died in a train accident in 2005.

=== Ken Martin ===
(Hunt Powers, 1963)

Part of the original cast, Ken Martin is a doctor at General Hospital. He gets engaged to Cynthia Allison and marries her after Phil Brewer leaves her for his wife Jessie.

=== Rosalie Martinez ===
(Linda Elena Tovar, 2014–15)

Former nurse and personal assistant of Nina Clay. Conspired with Nikolas Cassadine to help him gain control of ELQ through corporate espionage. Ex-wife of Brad Cooper.

=== Linda Massey ===
(Chandra Wilson, 2018)

=== Wendy Masters (deceased) ===
(Terri Hawkes, 1990)

Blackmailed Ned and Monica with a tape of their affair at the spa. Developed an obsession with Ned. Slashed Dawn's wedding veil. Was found stabbed to death and seated on a carousel horse after a police charity event. Before her death, she had been sneaking voice-altered tapes to reporter Shep Casey, which eventually helped Shep and Anna Devane discover the secret of Decker's past in Midvale.

=== Courtney Matthews (deceased) ===
(Alicia Leigh Willis, 2001–06, 2015, 2020)

Only daughter of Mike Corbin and Janine Matthews. Mother of Spencer Cassadine. Ex-wife of A. J. Quartermaine, Jason Morgan, and Jasper Jacks. Part of the Corinthos family. Died during the encephalitis outbreak after giving birth to son Spencer.

=== Janine Matthews ===
(DeLane Matthews, 2001–03, 2006)

Mother of Courtney Matthews. Tried to blackmail Edward Quartermaine. Moved to New Jersey.

=== Matthew Mayes (deceased) ===
(Matt Riedy, 2016)

Chief of neurosurgery. Clashed with other doctors and patients for being strictly by the book. Murdered by Paul Hornsby.

=== Beth Maynard ===
(Michele Conaway, 1975–76)

Sister of Diana Maynard Taylor. Nurse at General Hospital.

=== John McBain ===
(Michael Easton, 2012–13 on General Hospital)

Police detective. Father of Liam McBain. Ex-husband of Blair Cramer. Friends with Anna Devane and Sam McCall. Blames Sonny Corinthos for his half-sister's death.

=== Cody McCall (deceased) ===
(Stanley Kamel, 2003–04)

Father of Danny McCall. Adoptive father of Sam McCall. Ex-husband of Evelyn Bass. Stated to be the descendant of historical figure Jack McCall, assassin of Wild Bill Hickok. Posed as a butler to the Cassadine family. Con artist who taught Sam the same skills. Was hanged by his former business partner in the tunnels at Wyndemere Castle.

=== Danny McCall (deceased) ===
(Henri Lubatti, 2004)
(David Greenman, 2005–06)

Mentally handicapped son of Cody McCall and Evelyn Bass. Adoptive brother of Sam McCall. Accidentally killed his mother in a house fire. Was cared for by Sam, who ran cons to provide for him, after his mother died. Died during the encephalitis outbreak in 2006.

=== Lila McCall (deceased) ===
(mentioned character)

Stillborn daughter of Sonny Corinthos and Sam McCall. Part of the Corinthos family, Jerome family and Cassadine family.

=== Sam McCall (deceased) ===
(Kelly Monaco, 2003–24)
(Lindsay Hartley, 2020, 2022)

Daughter of Alexis Davis and Julian Jerome. Adoptive daughter of Cody McCall and Evelyn Bass. Mother of Lila McCall (stillborn), Danny Morgan, and Scout Cain. Ex-Wife of Drew Cain & Jason Morgan. Was in a relationship with Dante Falconeri before her death.

=== David McCallister ===
(unknown, 1989)

Dated and conspired with Tracy Quartermaine. Conspired with Jimmy O'Herlihy. Murdered WSB agent Tucker. Was murdered and his heart was transplanted into Iona Huntington.

=== Colleen McHenry ===
(Amanda Tepe, 2006–07)

Nanny hired by Helena Cassadine to take care of Spencer Cassadine. Developed an unhealthy obsession with Nikolas Cassadine, later drugging him and his butler Alfred. Kidnapped Spencer Cassadine. Was sent to prison.

=== Angus McKay (deceased) ===
(Guy Doleman, 1986–87)

Father of Duke Lavery. Dated Mary Lavery. Drank poison to end a long war against the Jerome family.

=== Camellia McKay (also known as Sister Mary Camellia) ===
(Elizabeth Keifer, 1987)

Novice nun. Raised to believe she was the daughter of mobster Angus McKay. Camellia fell in love with Duke Lavery, who rejected her because he was secretly McKay's biological son. After learning she was switched at birth, Camellia pursued a relationship with Duke, but she failed when he married Anna so she returned to Canada. A psychiatric nurse at GH working with Tom Hardy.

=== Janet McKay ===
(Lynn Wood, 1987)

Aunt of Duke and Camellia; sister of Angus. Tried to prevent Camellia from remembering her past and encouraged her to return to the convent.

=== Joshua "Skeeter" McKee ===
(Jamie McEnnan, 1987–88)

Son of Martha McKee. Brother of Melissa McKee.

=== Martha McKee ===
(Nancy Becker-Kennedy, 1987–89)

Friend of Bobbie Spencer who used a wheelchair. Raised two kids, Melissa and Joshua McKee.

=== Melissa McKee ===
(Ami Dolenz, 1987–89)

Daughter of Martha McKee. Sister of Skeeter McKee. Foster daughter of Bobbie Spencer and Jake Meyer. Dated Greg Howard. Fell in with a bad crowd and she and her friend Val Tuesday Knight tried to rob Kelly's. Crushed on Colton Shore and worked at Kelly's to make it up to Ruby.

=== Meghan McKenna ===
(Teri Reeves, 2011)

Daughter of Thomas McKenna and Shannon O'Reilly. Sister of Fiona and Siobhan McKenna. Used to get Siobhan to work against Lucky Spencer and for the Balkan. Lucky and Siobhan saved her, and she moved to Spain to get away from the danger. Came back to Port Charles after Siobhan's death to find out what had happened and blamed Lucky for her sister's death.

=== Siobhan McKenna (deceased) ===
(Erin Chambers, 2010–11)

Daughter of Thomas McKenna and Shannon O'Reily. Sister of Fiona McKenna and Meghan McKenna. Married to Lucky Spencer. Killed by Anthony Zacchara.

=== Augusta McLeod ===
(Judith McConnell, 1973–75)

Nurse at General Hospital. Was sent to prison for murdering Phil Brewer. Had Peter Taylor's son in prison. Boy was adopted out.

=== Nanny McTavish (deceased) ===
(Helena Carroll, 1992)

Mother of Cesar Faison. Nanny to a young Anna Devane and Holly Sutton. Was killed by her son with a bullet that was meant for Robert Scorpio.

=== James Meadows ===
(John J. York, 1997–98)

Double of Mac Scorpio who took his place to try to frame Mac for the murder of Jasper Jacks.

=== Peggy Mercer ===
(K. T. Stevens, 1963–65)

Part of the original cast, Peggy is a socialite that is engaged to Dr. Steve Hardy, but upset that he always puts his work ahead of her. She leaves Steve and returns to her former love, Roy Lansing.

=== Philip Mercer ===
(Neil Hamilton, 1963)

Part of the original cast, Phillip Mercer is the father of Peggy Mercer.

=== Jake Meyer ===
(Sam Behrens, 1983–88)

Attorney. Ex-husband of Bobbie Spencer. Dated Rose Kelly. Resides in South America.

=== Diane Miller ===
(Carolyn Hennesy, 2006–)

Attorney for Jason Morgan and Sonny Corinthos and their families. In a long-term relationship with Max Giambetti. Good friends with Alexis Davis.

=== Harmony Miller ===
(Inga Cadranel, 2019–23)
(Priscilla Garita, 2022, temp)

Formerly Lorraine Miller. Former supporter of Dawn of Day. Mother of Willow Tait.

=== Mickey Miller ===
(Milton Berle, 1981–82)

=== Farah Mir ===
(Rosie Malek-Yonan, 2008)

Mother of Leyla Mir.

=== Leyla Mir (deceased) ===
(Nazanin Boniadi, 2007–09)

Nurse at General Hospital. Slept with Dr. Patrick Drake. Had a feud with Dr. Robin Scorpio. Was friends with Nadine Crowell. Had one date with Damien Spinelli. Died after a biotoxin was released in General Hospital in 2009. Was engaged when she died.

=== Trey Mitchell (deceased) ===
(Erik Valdez, 2012–13)

Biological son of Joe Scully Jr. and Connie Falconeri Grad student at Yale University. Former Producer of Kristina Davis' reality show, Mob Princess. Friend of Starr Manning. Ex-husband of Kristina Davis. Manipulated Kristina into marrying him to get to her father, Sonny Corinthos. Dies after being taken off life support, due to a car accident that left him brain-dead.

=== Damon Montague ===
(Darin Toonder, 2023)

Psychiatrist at General Hospital. Arrested by Dante Falconeri.

=== Maia "Madame Maia" Montebello ===
(Anita Dangler, 1995)

Psychic; brought to Port Charles by Damian Smith to con Lucy Coe.

=== Alicia Montenegro ===
(Kelly Monaco, 2005)

Was expected to marry a man named Andrew Olsen by her mother Allegra. Jason Morgan and Sam McCall met her in 2005. She looked exactly like Sam, and so Allegra forced Sam to marry Andrew in her daughter's place. Andrew was killed and Sam was initially blamed for it, but then Allegra exposed her daughter and Alicia went to prison.

=== Allegra Montenegro ===
(Meg Bennett, 2005)

Mother of Alicia Montenegro. Kidnapped Jason Morgan and Sam McCall and forced Sam to pose as her daughter Alicia so that she could win Andrew Olsen's inheritance.

=== Marcella Montoya ===
(Lilly Melgar, 2003)

Former prostitute hired by Lorenzo Alcazar. Look-alike of Sonny Corinthos' first wife Lily Rivera.

=== Earl Moody (deceased) ===
(Unknown actor)

Brother of Kathleen Moody. Uncle of Patrick and Kevin O'Connor. Strangled to death by his nephew, Kevin O'Connor.

=== Clement Moore ===
(Philip Cass, 2024)

Chief Pharmacist at General Hospital

=== Susan Moore (deceased) ===
(Gail Ramsey, 1978–83)

Daughter of Mary Anne and Bert Moore. Birth mother of twins Jason Morgan and Drew Cain, whose father was Alan Quartermaine. Killed by Crane Tolliver while attempting to blackmail Edward Quartermaine. Was married to Scott Baldwin.

=== Angel Moran ===
(Joseph di Reda, 1986–89)

Trusted friend of Duke Lavery and manager of Duke's Club.

=== Miguel Morez ===
(Ricky Martin, 1994–96)

Singer. Protégé of Lois and Brenda at L&B Records. Formally engaged to Lily Rivera, with whom he had a child named Juan when they were sixteen. Fled to United States to avoid a hit put on him by Lily's father, Hernando Rivera. Found B.J. Jones after her school van crashed.

=== Chloe Morgan (deceased) ===
(Tava Smiley, 1999–2001)

Distant cousin of Lila Quartermaine and Hal Morgan. Dated Jasper Jacks. Had a marriage of convenience with Ned Ashton. Killed by Stavros Cassadine.

=== Daniel "Danny" Morgan ===
(Gage and Gavin, 2012)
(Claire and Juliette, 2012)
(Jaxon and Jakob Kring, 2012–14)
(Caden and Corben Rothweiler, 2014–15)
(Braiden and Dylan Kazowski, 2015–16)
(TK Weaver, 2016–19)
(Porter Fasullo 2019–21)
(Zakary Risinger, 2021–)

Son of Jason Morgan and Sam McCall. Maternal Half-brother of Scout Cain and Lila McCall (deceased); paternal half-brother of Jake Spencer.

=== Gertrude Morgan ===
(Donna Pescow, 1999–2001)

Trouble making aunt of Chloe Morgan who came to Port Charles to prove Chloe's marriage to Ned Ashton was invalid.

=== Hal Morgan (deceased) ===
(Unknown actor, 1978)

Brother of Lila Quartermaine. Killed in battle when his plane was shot down.

=== Jason Morgan ===
(Quin Carlson, 1982)
(Brian Beck, 1983–86)
(Steve Burton, 1991–2012, 2017–21, 2024–)
(Carmel Fainbaum, 2012, as a baby)
(Paul Chirico, 2017)

Mob enforcer for Sonny Corinthos. Illegitimate son of Alan Quartermaine and Susan Moore. Adoptive son of Monica Quartermaine. Father of Jake Spencer and Danny Morgan. Ex-husband of Sam McCall, Courtney Matthews, and Brenda Barrett. Presumed dead for over five years. Was Jason Quartermaine until a car accident left him with amnesia; he changed his last name to Morgan.

=== Decker Moss ===
(Michael Watson, 1989–91)

Former bartender and co-owner of the club Body Heat. Half-brother of Colton Shore. Engaged to Dawn Winthrop before her death. Cousin of Lucy Coe.

=== Griffin Munro ===
(Matt Cohen, 2016–19)

Neurosurgeon and priest. Son of Duke Lavery and Margaret Munro, conceived prior to Duke's time in Port Charles. Learned of his father's identity following his mother's death. Bonded with Anna Devane who told him about his deceased father. Ex-lover of Claudette Beaulieu & Kiki Jerome. Believed briefly that Charlotte Cassadine was his daughter. Arrested for Kiki's murder before it was discovered that Ryan Chamberlain was the killer.

=== Chase Murdock ===
(Ivan Bonar, 1966–71, 1973–79)

=== Caroline Murray ===
(Anne Wyndham, 1972–75)

Sister of Kent Murray. Niece of Jessie Brewer.

=== Kent Murray ===
(Mark Hamill, 1972–73)

Nephew of Jessie Brewer. Brother of Caroline Murray.

=== Mouse ===
(Melissa Hayden, 1989)

Street urchin, living in the catacombs, helps Frisco hide out when he returns from the dead.

== N ==
=== Peggy Nelson (deceased) ===
(Ann Morrison, 1971)

Strangled by Arnold Nelson in 1971. General Hospital's first death.

=== Kim Nero ===
(Tamara Braun, 2017–19)

Mother of Oscar Nero. Knew Drew Cain years ago in San Diego. Lost touch before realizing she was pregnant with Oscar. Found his family in Port Charles. Since Drew didn't remember their love, she moved on with Julian Jerome until Franco was given Drew's early memories. Left town after Oscar's death and when Drew decided to let Franco take control of his body again.

=== Oscar Nero (deceased) ===
(Rio Mangini, 2017)
(Garren Stitt, 2017–19)

Dated Josslyn Jacks. Son of Kim Nero and Drew Cain. Died from a brain tumor.

=== Newscaster ===
(Kale Browne, 2003–07)

=== Lisa Niles (deceased) ===
(Julie Mond, 2009)
(Brianna Brown, 2010–11)

Ex-girlfriend and medical school classmate of Patrick Drake. Best friends with Louise Addison. Had a relationship with Terrell Jackson. Ex-lover of Johnny Zacchara. Obsessed with winning Patrick back and getting rid of his wife, Robin Scorpio. Murdered by Matt Hunter.

== O ==
=== Liesl Obrecht ===
(Kathleen Gati, 2012–23)
(Finola Hughes, 2013)

Born Liesl Westbourne. Sister of Madeline Reeves. Former chief of staff at General Hospital and director of a clinic in Lucerne, Switzerland. Helped Cesar Faison keep Robin Scorpio captive. Ex-lover of Cesar Faison and Victor Cassadine. Mother of Britt Westbourne and Nathan West. Aunt of Nina Reeves. Grandmother to James West. Held Peter August hostage while mourning the death of her son. Considers Anna Devane a rival for Cesar Faison's affections – pretended to be her in 2013. Currently in a relationship with Scott Baldwin.

=== Kevin O'Connor (deceased) ===
(Kevin Bernhardt, 1985–86)

Doctor at General Hospital. Brother of Patrick. Was married to Terry Brock. Responsible for the Laurelton Murders and the Brownstone Murders. Tried to kill Terry Brock. Was hit over the head by Terry with a rock and fell off a cliff.

=== Patrick O'Connor ===
(Guy Mack, 1985–88)

Resident doctor at General Hospital. Brother of Kevin O'Connor. Dated Terry Brock, but didn't support her music career. When they broke up, he dated Amy Vining His Wife is Kristina Katie Quartermaine but was drawn again to Terry. He eventually gave up on Terry and left Port Charles.

=== Jimmy O'Herlihy ===
(Nicholas Walker, 1989–1990)

Nephew of Mary Finnegan. Involved in counterfing ring.

=== Olin ===
(Beulah Quo, 1985–91)

Chinese woman from the Asian Quarter. Grandmother of Suki. Friend of The Ancient One. Became Anna's housekeeper and Robin's caretaker after Filomena's death.

=== Connor Olivera ===
(Michael Lynch, 1991–92)

Friend of Mac Scorpio. Tried to protect Dominique Stanton from her abusive husband. Was on the run from immigration. Son of Sean Donely. Managed and sang at The Outback.

=== Brighton O'Reilly (deceased) ===
(Billie Hayes, 1981, 1985)

WSB Agent. Shot and killed by Victor Cassadine in 1981. Remembered in a series of flashbacks in 1985 showcasing the early adventures of WSB Agents Robert Scorpio and Anna Devane.

=== Ronan O'Reilly (deceased) ===
(Mentioned character, 2010)

Assassin from Ireland. Lookalike of Lucky Spencer. Murdered Siobhan McKenna's boyfriend. Had ties to The Balkan. Killed after an accident at a soccer game. Lucky impersonates O'Reilly after his death while working undercover for Interpol.

=== Finian O'Toole ===
(Arte Johnson, 1991–92)

Mac Scorpio's first friend in Port Charles, having helped him escape and hide from his angry brother Robert. Was a very colorful man, having had five wives and numerous jobs. Became Sly Eckert's caretaker and was arrested after killing Sly's slimy mother, Nancy, who had been threatening to take custody away from Bill Eckert.

== P ==
=== Delores Padilla ===
(Rebeka Montoya, 2011–12)

Detective for the Port Charles Police Department. Takes on several of Dante Falconeri's cases after he is shot. Married to Eddie Cabrera, who is suspected of assaulting strippers in Port Charles. Incriminates herself while working for Johnny Zacchara to get evidence against Sonny. Moved to upstate New York.

=== Jonathan Paget (deceased) ===
(Gregory Beecroft, 1990)

The pseudonym used by a presumed Duke Lavery after undergoing plastic surgery. Duke had been presumed dead in a building explosion and Paget claims he joined the Witness Protection Program. Unable to go on without Anna and Robin, a desperate Duke becomes Paget to return to his family. Robin immediately takes to Paget, but Anna is suspicious of him and it is not until Olivia Jerome blurts out Paget's identity that Anna finally accepts that he is Duke. Paget is killed soon after by Julian Jerome. In 2012, it was revealed that Paget was an impostor, trying to steal Duke's identity under orders from Julian.

=== Gio Palmieri ===
(Giovanni Mazza, 2024-)

Biological son of Brook Lynn Quartermaine and Dante Falconeri. Grandson of Ned Quartermaine, Lois Cerullo, Sonny Corinthos, and Olivia Falconeri. Great-grandson of Tracy Quartermaine. Was given up for adoption by Brook Lynn and was raised secretly with the Cerullos and Falconeris. Reveals his true origins at the 2025 Nurses' Ball after hearing Lulu Spencer confronting Lois about Gio's identity.

=== Trent Parker (deceased) ===
(Trent Cameron, 2004)

Killed by Mary Bishop in 2004.

=== Victoria Parker ===
(Terri Garber, 1993)

=== Helen Parks (deceased) ===
(mentioned character)

Murdered by Ryan Chamberlain before coming to Port Charles.

=== Blackie Parrish ===
(John Stamos, 1982–84)

Foster son of Rick and Lesley Webber. Foster brother of Laura Spencer. Sent to prison for eighteen months for manslaughter.

=== Raj Patel ===
(Noshir Dalal, 2015, 2019)

Stavros Cassadine's younger counterpart.

=== Cody Paul ===
(Graham Shiels, 2007–08)

An Iraq war veteran with posttraumatic stress disorder seeks Dr. Lainey Winters for treatment. Former army buddy of Cooper Barrett, with a vendetta against Logan Hayes. Goes to prison for the murder of Lainey's father, Roger, after turning off the life support machine, believing it to be the wishes of both Lainey and her father. Returns in 2008 and briefly works for Jason Morgan.

=== Penny ===
(Peyton McCormick, 2013)

A nurse who works at General Hospital. Met Michael Corinthos at the Floating Rib and had a one-night stand with him. Later attended Morgan Corinthos and Kiki Jerome's wedding reception as Michael's date, but left after realizing Michael is not over Kiki.

=== Bryan Phillips ===
(Todd Davis, 1978–86)

Son of Eddie and Estelle Phillips. Husband of Claudia Johnston Phillips. Father of twin daughters. Shot while being held hostage in 1983 with Monica Quartermaine and Bobbie Spencer.

=== Claudia Johnston Phillips ===
(Bianca Ferguson, 1978–87)

Wife of Bryan Phillips. Mother of twin daughters.

=== Donna Phillips ===
(Unknown actress, 1987)

Daughter of Bryan and Claudia Phillips. Sister of Francine Phillips.

=== Dustin Phillips (deceased) ===
(Mark Lawson, 2019–20)

He was Josslyn Jack's English teacher at Port Charles High School. Dated Lulu Spencer after her divorce with Dante Falconeri. Died during the Floating Rib explosion.

=== Eddie Phillips ===
(Sammy Davis Jr., 1983)

The alcoholic father of Bryan Phillips. Sammy Davis Jr. was a fan of the series and requested the role.

=== Francine Phillips ===
(Unknown actress, 1987)

Daughter of Bryan and Claudia Phillips. Sister of Donna Phillips.

=== Shawn Phillips ===
(Owen Saxon, 2018)

Involved with Michael Carson in holding Cassandra Pierce, Hamilton Finn, and Anna Devane captive in revenge for former Ferncliff staff members. He and Michael Carson were later arrested and taken into custody.

=== Cassandra Pierce (deceased) ===
(Jessica Tuck, 2017–19)

International criminal. Enemy of Anna Devane, Hamilton Finn, Nina Reeves, Valentin Cassadine and others including Sonny Corinthos. Died in a boat explosion orchestrated by Valentin. Later replaced by her male counterpart Cyrus Renault from Seattle, Washington in 2020.

=== Henry Pinkham ===
(Peter Kilman, 1967–75)

Doctor at General Hospital who marries Sharon McGillis. Takes drugs after being overworked, and is blackmailed by pushers until Steve Hardy and Lee Baldwin help him. The character is written off in October 1975.

=== Sharon McGillis Pinkham ===
(Sharon DeBord, 1965–74)

Nurse at General Hospital who marries Henry Pinkham. After their child is born, Sharon has a hard time returning to work. She is upset when Henry hires Nurse Linda Cooper and divorces Henry when she leaves town to care for her mother.

=== Andy Plummer ===
(Scott Cooper Ryan, 2015)

College intern who shoots behind the scenes footage for Dillon Quartermaine's movie (Dillon later cancelled production). Recorded scandalous footage of Valerie Spencer admitting to Dillon that she slept with Dante Falconeri. Dillon, out of jealousy, shows the footage at the Halloween party on the Haunted Star, which exposes Dante's tryst with Valerie to Lulu Spencer.

=== Buddy Powers (deceased) ===
(mentioned character)

First husband of Mary Mae Ward. Was killed during World War II, and left Mary Mae a widow at age 18.

=== Leland Powell (deceased) ===
(Mentioned Character)

Sam McCall's husband when under a fake name then used to run a con to take the marks money. Obituary seen on screen 1942–2018.

=== John Prentice (deceased) ===
(Barry Atwater, 1964–67)

Obstetrician at General Hospital, cousin of Jan Brown. Marries Jessie Brewer in 1967 and shortly dies of an accidental prescription overdose. His daughter Polly Prentice tries to frame Jessie for his murder.

=== Polly Prentice (deceased) ===
(Kathy Ferrar, 1966)
( Jennifer Billingsley, 1967–69)

Polly disapproves of her father John Prentice's marriage to Jessie Brewer. When John dies, Polly tries to frame Jessie for the murder, but it is deemed an accident. Jessie remarries Phil Brewer, and Polly has an affair with him. Phil is suspected of murdering Polly and goes on the run, but Polly's death is deemed an accident.

=== Jared Preston Jr. ===
(Matt Corboy, 2017)

Ex-husband of Hayden Barnes. Went to prison for hit-and-run that Hayden caused, in exchange for money. Tried to blackmail Hayden, but his plan failed.

=== Charlie Prince ===
(Michael Tylo, 1989)

Paternal half-brother of Larry Ashton. Uncle of Ned Ashton. Great-uncle of Brook Lynn Ashton.

=== Esme Prince (deceased) ===
(Avery Kristen Pohl, 2021-24)

Daughter of Ryan Chamberlain and Heather Webber, maternal half sister of Steven Webber and Franco Baldwin, and mother of Ace Cassadine.

=== Carol Pulaski ===
(Robin Curtis, 1991)

=== Hank Pulaski ===
(Larry Pennell, 1963)

=== Grant Putnam ===
(Brian Patrick Clarke, 1983, 1985–88)

Frames Grant Andrews for attempted murder. Tries to kill former fiancée Celia Quartermaine in 1984 and tries to sabotage her wedding to Grant Andrews. Arrested by Robert Scorpio, and in an attempt to get revenge kidnaps Anna Devane and tries to kidnap Robin Scorpio in 1988. Murders Filomena Soltini. Sent back to the sanitarium after finally being caught. Also known as the Snowman.

== Q ==
=== Alan Quartermaine (deceased) ===
(Stuart Damon, 1977–2008, 2011–13)
(Uncredited, 2014)

Former chief of staff at General Hospital. Son of Edward and Lila Quartermaine. Ex-husband of Lucy Coe. Married to Monica Quartermaine until his death. Father of A. J. Quartermaine, Jason Morgan and Drew Cain. Adoptive father of Emily Quartermaine and Skye Chandler Quartermaine. Part of the Quartermaine family. Died after suffering numerous heart attacks during the Metro Court Hostage Crisis. Haunted his sister Tracy because she altered his will after he died. Appeared as a ghost on several occasions.

=== Alan "A.J." Quartermaine Jr. (deceased) ===
(Eric Kroh, 1979–83)
(Abraham Geary, 1983)
(Jason Marsden, 1986–88)
(Christopher Ren Nelson, 1988–89)
(Justin Whalin, 1989)
(Gerald Hopkins, 1989–92)
(Sean Kanan, 1993–97, 2012–14)
(Billy Warlock, 1997–2003, 2005)

Son of Alan and Monica Quartermaine. Member of the Quartermaine family. Biological father of Michael Corinthos. Grandfather of Wiley Corinthos, Amelia Corinthos, and Daisy Gilmore. Forced to sign away his paternal rights to Michael after he was assaulted and blackmailed by Sonny Corinthos. Ex-husband of Carly Corinthos and Courtney Matthews. Died from complications after being shot by Sonny Corinthos.

=== Alexandria Quartermaine (deceased) ===
(Renee Anderson, 1981)

Niece of Edward Quartermaine. Was accidentally frozen to death in Mikkos Cassadine's ice chamber, along with her fiancé Tony Cassadine.

=== Betsy Quartermaine ===
(Peggy Walton-Walker, 1987)

Third wife of Quentin Quartermaine, stepmother of Celia and daughter-in-law of Herbert; Betsy kills her father-in-law Herbert in 1987 and a murder mystery ensues. She is discovered a month later.

=== Celia Quartermaine ===
(Sherilyn Wolter, 1983–86)

1st cousin twice removed of Edward Quartermaine via her grandfather Herbert Quartermaine. Former wife of Grant Andrews and Jimmy Lee Holt. Best friend of Holly Sutton-Scorpio.

=== Dillon Quartermaine ===
(Kevin and Michael Jacobson, 1992–93)
(Scott Clifton, 2003–07)
(Robert Palmer Watkins, 2015–17)

Son of Paul Hornsby and Tracy Quartermaine. Maternal half-brother of Ned Ashton; paternal half-brother of Susan Hornsby and Paul Hornsby Jr. Part of the Quartermaine family. Aspiring filmmaker. Ex-husband of Georgie Jones.

=== Edward Quartermaine (deceased) ===
(David Lewis, 1978–93)
(Les Tremayne, 1987–88)
(John Ingle, 1993–2004, 2006–12)
(Jed Allan, 2004–05)
(Uncredited, 2014, 2019)

Chief Executive Officer of E.L.Q. Industries. Patriarch of the Quartermaine family. Widower of Lila Quartermaine; Ex-husband of Heather Webber. Father of Alan Quartermaine, Tracy Quartermaine, Jimmy Lee Holt and Bradley Ward. Died of natural causes.

=== Emily Quartermaine (born Emily Bowen) (deceased) ===
(Amber Tamblyn, 1995–2001)
(Natalia Livingston, 2003–09, 2013–14)

Daughter of Hank and Paige Bowen, later adopted by Alan and Monica Quartermaine. Medical intern at General Hospital. Part of the Quartermaine family. Ex-wife of Zander Smith and Nikolas Cassadine. Was engaged to Nikolas again on the night of her death. Strangled to death by the Text Message Killer. Has returned several times as a spirit in following years.

=== Herbert Quartermaine (deceased) ===
(Will B. Hunt, 1987)

Cousin of Edward Quartermaine. Father of Quentin Quartermaine. Grandfather of Celia Quartermaine.

=== Lila Quartermaine (deceased) ===
(Anna Lee, 1978–2003)
(Meg Wyllie, 1994)
Juliet Grainger (2003–04)
(Uncredited, 2012, 2014, 2019)

Daughter of Harold Morgan. Wife of Edward Quartermaine. Mother of Alan and Tracy Quartermaine. Matriarch of the Quartermaine family, who was often the voice of reason in her dysfunctional family. Died in her sleep. Her adoptive great-granddaughter, Lila Rae Alcazar, was named in honor of her.

=== Monica Quartermaine (deceased) ===
(Patsy Rahn, 1976–77)
(Leslie Charleson, 1977–2023)
(Patty McCormack, temp, 2018)
(Holly Kaplan, temp, 2022)

Chief cardiologist at General Hospital and board member of E.L.Q. Industries. Mother of A. J. Quartermaine and Dawn Winthrop. Adoptive mother of Emily Quartermaine and Jason Morgan. Widow of Dr. Alan Quartermaine. Ex-wife of Jeff Webber.

Deceased 2025

=== Quentin Quartermaine ===
(Alex Sheafe, 1983–86)
(Allan Miller, 1987–88)

1st and once removed Cousin of Edward Quartermaine. Son of Herbert Quartermaine and father of Celia Quartermaine. Adopted the three children of his second wife. His third wife Betsy was responsible for the death of Herbert.

=== Skye Chandler Quartermaine ===
(Robin Christopher, 2001–08, 2010–12)

Daughter of Rae Cummings. Adoptive daughter of Alan Quartermaine. Originally believed to be Alan's biological daughter; Alan legally adopted her after she was revealed to not be his daughter, terminating her previous adoption by Adam Chandler. Ex-wife of Jasper Jacks. Mother of Lila Rae Alcazar. Left town with Lila Rae, and makes periodic returns.

=== Tracy Quartermaine ===
(Jane Elliot, 1978–80, 1989–93, 1996, 2003–17, 2019–23, 2024-
(Christine Jones, temp. 1989)
(Allison Miller, 2006, young Tracy)

Daughter of Edward and Lila Quartermaine. On several occasions, Tracy has been exiled from Port Charles by the Quartermaine family. Ex-wife of Larry Ashton, Mitch Williams, mob boss Gino Soleito (twice), Paul Hornsby, and Anthony Zacchara. Widow of Luke Spencer, Mother of Dillon Quartermaine and Ned AshtonQuartermaine.

=== Kylie Quinlan ===
(Brynn Thayer, 1994)

== R ==
=== Bryce Ramirez (deceased) ===
(Douglas Morabito)

Police lieutenant in Port Charles. Killed by a car bomb which had been planted by the brother of a criminal he arrested.

=== Maria Ramirez (deceased) ===
(June Lockhart, 1984–86, 1988, 1990–92, 1998, 2000)

Grandmother of Felicia Jones.Owner of a Texan hacienda.

=== Burt Ramsey ===
(Bob Hastings, 1979–86)

Police captain in Port Charles. Becomes co-chief of police with Anna Devane. Also "Mr. Big", the leader of a money-laundering ring.

=== Terry Randolph ===
(Cassandra James, 2018–)

=== Lak Rashi ===
(Lak Rana, 2013)

=== Coleman Ratcliffe ===
(Blake Gibbons, 2002–12, 2014)

Former owner of The Floating Rib, previously known as Jake's Bar. Once hired by Helena Cassadine, his former lover, to kidnap Emily Quartermaine. Also gets involved with Skye Quartermaine and Kate Howard.

=== Kyle Ratcliffe (deceased) ===
(Andrew St. John, 2003)

High school classmate of Maxie Jones. Sleeps with Maxie and posts video footage on a website. Drug addict, and dies of an overdose.

=== Natalie Rawles ===
(Carlease Burke, 2016–17)

Judge

=== Thomas Rayner ===
(Mark Pinter, 2008–10)

FBI agent charged with curtailing the mob in Port Charles.

=== Madeline West Reeves (deceased) ===
(Donna Mills, 2014–15, 2018)

Born Magda Westbourne. Sister of Liesl Obrecht. Mother of Nina Reeves. Grandmother of the late Nelle Benson and Willow Tait. Aunt of Britt Westbourne and Nathan West; raised Nathan as her son. Sent to prison for murdering Silas Clay. Died in prison.

=== Nina Reeves ===
(Michelle Stafford, 2014–19)
(Cynthia Watros, 2019–)

Daughter of Madeline Reeves. Adoptive sister of Nathan West. Cousin of the late Britt Westbourne. Ex-wife of Valentin Cassadine, Silas Clay, and Sonny Corinthos. Mother of the late Nelle Benson and Willow Tait. Grandmother of Wiley Corinthos, Wiley Cooper-Jones (deceased), and Amelia Corinthos. Was in a coma for over 20 years.

=== Cyrus Renault (deceased) ===
(Jeff Kober, 2020–25)

Drug kingpin from Seattle who came after Sonny Corinthos to gain control of Port Charles. Son of Gordon and Florence Grey. Brother of Martin Grey. Half-brother of Laura Collins. Spent time in Pentonville Penitentiary after being transferred back from Flatland Federal Prison in the Midwest. Now living in Port Charles as a free man, working at the Metro Court and acting as an itinerant preacher. He dropped off the canvas on April 18, 2024 before returning four months later on August 20. Presumed killed by Josslyn Jacks with the death covered up by Jack Brennan.

=== Matt Reynolds (deceased) ===
(Jonathan Bouck, 1997)

Introduces Emily Quartermaine to drugs. Dies of an overdose. Revealed to have been receiving drugs from Pierce Dorman, whom Monica Quartermaine was having an affair with at the time, then supplying them to Emily.

=== Zoe Richardson ===
(mentioned character)

Younger half-sister of Maya Ward. Maya's mother is Faith Ward, with Zoe and Maya sharing the same father. Zoe's mother dies in a car accident in late 2009, according to Maya's letter.

=== Madelyn Richmond ===
(Sheila Margaret MacRae, 1991)

Character appears December 3, 1991 Episode 7,336.

=== Marco Rios ===
(Adrian Anchondo, 2025–2026)

Attorney. Son of Jenz Sidwell and Natalia Ramirez, and brother of Alison Rogers aka Blaze.

=== Carlos Rivera (deceased) ===
(Jeffrey Vincent Parise, 2013–16)

Mob soldier for Ava and Julian Jerome. Married to Sabrina Santiago at the time of his death. Father of Teddy Rivera. Killed by Julian.

=== Hernando Rivera (deceased) ===
(Ismael 'East' Carlo, 1994–97)

Father of Lily Rivera Corinthos. Attempts to kill Sonny Corinthos in a car bombing, but his daughter is killed instead. He shoots and kills himself with a gun provided by Sonny.

=== Joe Rivera ===
(Jeffrey Vincent Parise, 2016)

Doctor who is the twin brother of Carlos Rivera. Arrived in Port Charles to connect with his sister-in-law, Sabrina, and his nephew, Teddy, following Carlos' death. After Sabrina's death, Joe took Teddy and returned to Puerto Rico.

=== Eduardo "Teddy" Rivera ===
(Eli and Ilee Alzubaidy, 2016)

Son of Carlos Rivera and Sabrina Santiago. Taken back to Puerto Rico by his uncle, Joe, following the death of both his parents.

=== Portia Robinson ===
(Brook Kerr, 2020–)

Mother of Trina Robinson. Ex-wife of Marcus Taggert. Doctor at General Hospital. Currently married to Curtis Ashford.

=== Trina Robinson ===
(Tiana Le, 2017–18)
(Sydney Mikayla, 2019–22)
(Tabyana Ali, 2022–)

Friend of Josslyn Jacks, Oscar Nero, and Cameron Webber. Daughter of Marcus Taggert and Portia Robinson. Works at Ava Jerome's gallery.

=== Cruz Rodriguez ===
(Adrian Alvarado, 2005–08)

Detective for the Port Charles Police Department. Partners with Lucky Spencer.

=== Casey Rogers ===
(Bradley Lockerman, 1990)

Alien from the planet Lumina, befriended by Robin Scorpio. Searching for the crystal that will send him back home, found on Spoon Island with enemy Cesar Faison. The night he leaves, his doppelgänger Shep Casey is seen.

=== Simon Romero ===
(Frank Runyeon, 1992)

=== Aaron Roland ===
(John DeLuca, 2016)

Barista who briefly dated Kristina Davis.

=== Dan Rooney ===
(Frank Maxwell, 1978–88)

The kindly Administrator at General Hospital. Involved with Jessie Brewer and Ruby Anderson. He was a key factor in dealing with the W.S.B. and Cassadine family during the Ice Princess story in 1981, having met both Mikkos and Helena years before. Dan was also acquainted with the Prince of Malkuth and helped the Port Charles Historical society with the display of that fictional country's artifacts. Dan was later stabbed when he discovered that the Durban family was perpetuating an oil scam, and cleared Luke who was initially accused due to Dan's suspicions that something was wrong. Dan remained an important member of the staff at General Hospital for a decade, retiring after Ruby Anderson turned down his proposal.

=== Rosco brothers ===
(Douglas Morabito and Connor Ready, 2003–08)

Contract killers hired by John Durant.

=== Faith Rosco (deceased) ===
(Cynthia Preston, 2002–05)

Wife of Rosco, a member of the mafia. Co-owner of the Haunted Star Casino. Gets involved with Justus Ward. Kidnaps Michael Corinthos, Kristina Davis and Morgan Corinthos in 2005. Shot by a hitman hired by A. J. Quartermaine. Later appears to Carly in hallucinations.

=== Pete Ross ===
(Edin Gali, 2015)

Actor who was paid by Ric Lansing and Hayden Barnes to pose as Hayden's husband in pictures, and help Hayden and Ric convince "Jake Doe" that he was Hayden's husband. Carly Corinthos later paid Pete to expose their scheme.

=== Winston Rudge ===
(David S. Lee, 2016–17; 2020)

Henchman who worked for Olivia St. John, then later on his own after Olivia was sent to a mental asylum.

=== Hector Ruiz (deceased) ===
(Reni Santoni, 2005)

Father of Manny, Mateo and Javier Ruiz. Mob boss from Miami. Murdered by Manny after he refuses to avenge Javier's death at the hands of Jason Morgan.

=== Javier Ruiz (deceased) ===
(Gonzalo Menendez, 2005)

Brother of Manny Ruiz. Son of Hector Ruiz. Dies in 2005 after he is shot by Jason Morgan in a stairwell at the Metro Court Hotel.

=== Manny Ruiz (deceased) ===
(Robert Lasardo, 2005–06)

Brother of Javier and Mateo Ruiz. Son of Hector Ruiz. Psychotically obsessed with Sam McCall, later shooting her in the stomach. Terrorizes Carly Corinthos. Kills John Durant, Justus Ward, Jesse Beaudry and, indirectly, Reese Marshall. Infamous for terrorizing people and surviving several apparent deaths. Believed to be reformed after removal of a brain tumor by Patrick Drake, but eventually returns to his villainous ways. Manny dies in 2006 after Jason Morgan throws him off the roof of General Hospital.

=== Mateo Ruiz ===
(Robert Lasardo, 2006–07)

Brother to Javier and twin of Manny Ruiz. Mateo is a reformed gang member who becomes a priest. Shot by Jerry Jacks during the Metro Court hostage crisis in 2007, but survives.

=== Leo Russell ===
(John Callahan, 1984–85)

Partner in crime with Lorena Sharpe. Swindles wealthy women.

=== Delia Ryan ===
(Ilene Kristen, 2013–15)

Character from Ryan's Hope. Sister of Bob Reid. Mother of Ava Jerome. Grandmother of Kiki Jerome and Avery Corinthos. Works at Ryan's Bar in New York.

== S ==
=== Kate Salor ===
(Whitney Sloan, 2003–04)

Heart transplant patient who befriended Maxie and Georgie Jones.

=== Maria Sanchez ===
(Mercedes Colon, 2005)

Lover of Lorenzo Alcazar. Mother of Diego Alcazar.

=== Gabriel Santiago (deceased) ===
Son of Patrick Drake and Sabrina Santiago. Paternal half-brother of Emma Drake and Noah Scorpio-Drake. Grandson of Noah Drake. Died of organ failure. Maternal Half-brother to Teddy Rivera.

=== Juan Santiago ===
(Valentino Moreno, 1994–95)
(Michael Saucedo, 1999–2001, 2013–14)

Biological son of Miguel Morez and Lily Rivera Corinthos. Adopted son of Mrs. Santiago and Armando Santiago. Dated Emily Quartermaine. Cousin of Sabrina Santiago. Left for South America in 2001. Returned in 2013 to give Sabrina her mother's wedding dress and in 2014 for Gabriel's funeral.

=== Sabrina Santiago (deceased) ===
(Teresa Castillo, 2012–16)

Nurse at General Hospital; former fiancée of Dr. Patrick Drake. Widow of Carlos Rivera. Cousin of Juan Santiago. Mother of Gabriel Santiago and Teddy Rivera. Dating Michael Corinthos at the time of her death. Murdered by Paul Hornsby.

=== Mac Scorpio ===
(John J. York, 1991–)

Former Port Charles Police Commissioner. Currently Chief of Detectives after a long absence from the PD. Former co-owner of The Outback, current co-owner of the Floating Rib. Former partner in Jones/Scorpio Private Investigations. Brother of Robert Scorpio. Uncle of Robin Scorpio. Adoptive father of Maxie and Georgie Jones. Husband of Felicia Jones. Adoptive grandfather of Georgie Spinelli, James West and Bailey Louise Jones.

=== Robert Scorpio ===
(Tristan Rogers, 1980–92, 1995, 2006, 2008, 2012–16, 2018–2025)

Former WSB agent and former Police Commissioner of Port Charles. Brother of Mac Scorpio and cousin of Prunella Witherspoon. Father of Robin Scorpio and Sasha Corbin. Formerly married to Anna Devane and Holly Sutton-Scorpio. Old friends with Luke Spencer, Bobbie Spencer, Laura Webber, and sister-in-law Felicia Scorpio, Left Port Charles with former wife Holly Scorpio in 2025.

=== Robin Scorpio-Drake ===
(Kimberly McCullough, 1985–2000, 2004–18, 2021)

Daughter of Robert Scorpio and Anna Devane. Sister of Leora Hayward. Mother of Emma Scorpio-Drake and Noah Scorpio-Drake. Raised by her uncle Mac Scorpio. Contracted HIV from her first love, Stone Cates, who died soon afterwards. Neuropathologist. Married to Dr. Patrick Drake. Presumed dead for almost two years before returning home to her family after being rescued from captivity. Moved to Berkeley, California with her family. Occasionally visits Port Charles.

=== Hannah Scott ===
(Lisa Vultaggio, 1999–2001)

FBI agent sent to gather evidence on Sonny Corinthos, whom she later fell in love with. Daughter of Roy DiLucca.

=== Jeffrey Scribner ===
(Jamil Walker Smith, 2014)

Accomplice of Peter Harrell Jr., who posed as an immigration officer. Helped Levi kidnap and hold Maxie Jones and Lulu Spencer-Falconeri. Shot by Peter.

=== Joseph Scully Sr. (deceased) ===
(Robert Miano, 1994–95)

Father of Joe Scully Jr. with wife, Marie Scully. Grandfather of Trey Mitchell. Sonny's number one mentor. Kidnapped Lucy Coe. Shot Mike Corbin. Killed Sonny Corinthos' stepfather Deke Woods. Killed by Sonny when he had to choose between Luke Spencer or Scully.

=== Joe Scully Jr. (deceased) ===
(Richard Steinmetz, 2012)

Son of the late Joe Scully Sr. and Marie Scully. As the result of rape, fathered Trey Mitchell with Kate Howard. Responsible for the death of John McBain's sister, Theresa. Hid in New Orleans for nearly twenty years, supposedly a legitimate businessmen. Rival of Sonny Corinthos and John McBain. Died From his wounds after being shot by Jason Morgan in a shootout.

=== Selma ===
(Mary Mara, 2014)

An associate of Sonny Corinthos. Pretended to be Mickey Diamond's sister, so his heart could be donated to Alice Gunderson.

=== Lorena Sharpe ===
(Shelley Taylor Morgan, 1984–86)

Cousin of Monica Quartermaine. Lover of Jimmy Lee Holt and nemesis of Celia Quartermaine. Moved to P.C. to open Avalon Spa. Conspired with Leo Russell to blackmail wealthy citizens. Caused Edward Quartermaine's heart attack. Married Derek Barrington and moved out of town.

=== Nancy Shaw ===
Adoptive Mother of Rebecca Shaw.

=== Rebecca Shaw ===
(Natalia Livingston, 2009)

X-ray technician at General Hospital. Biological twin sister of Emily Quartermaine. Sold on the black market when she was an infant. Adoptive daughter of William and Nancy Shaw, biological daughter of Hank and Paige Bowen. Came to Port Charles to get Emily's inheritance after her death. Dated Lucky Spencer. Dated Nikolas Cassadine as part of a plot hatched by Ethan Lovett. Moved to France when she learned of Nikolas' affair with Elizabeth Webber.

=== William Shaw ===
Adoptive Father of Rebecca Shaw.

=== Shawn ===
(Chad Doreck, 2018)
Doctor

=== Colton Shore ===
(Scott Thompson Baker, 1988–91)

Cousin of Lucy Coe. Briefly married to Felicia Jones.

=== Jenz Sidwell ===
(Carlo Rota, 2024-)

International warlord ran a refugee camp in Somalia. Fled Port Charles after the bomb explosion at the warehouse. Later returned to Port Charles and later became the new owner of Wyndemere Castle after buying it from a Greek firm.

=== Charlene Simpson ===
(Maree Cheatham, 1987–91)

Con artist. Mother of Colton Shore and Decker Moss. Aunt of Lucy Coe.

=== Eric Simpson ===
(Brandon Hooper, 1991–92)

Doctor. Dated Sheila

=== Murphy Sinclair ===
(Brad Rowe, 2010)

Ex-lover and ex-fiancé of Brenda Barrett. Lived with Brenda in Rome, Italy. Famous actor.

=== Kyle Sloane (deceased) ===
(Robb Derringer, 2014–15)
(Grayson McCouch, 2015)

Former FBI agent and Police Commissioner. In cahoots with Nikolas Cassadine. Killed by Paul Hornsby.

=== Tracker Sloane ===
(David Anthony Buglione, 2024)

Assassin for Jenz Sidwell

=== Damian Smith (deceased) ===
(Leigh J. McCloskey, 1993–96)

Son of mob boss Frank Smith. Former lover of Katherine Bell. Hit over the head by Justus Ward and died of smoke inhalation in a fire. Tried to destroy Bobbie and Tony Jones' marriage, but failed.

=== Frank Smith ===
(George Gaynes, 1979–80)
(Mitchell Ryan, 1993–94)
(Joseph Cortese, 2015)

Mobster. Kidnapped a pregnant Laura Spencer. Killed by Luke Spencer.

=== Jennifer Smith ===
(Lisa Marie, 1980)
(Roseanne Arnold, 1994)
(Sally Struthers, 2002)
(Holly Gagnier, 2015, 2022)

Daughter of mob boss Frank Smith. Sister to Damian Smith.

=== Shirley Smith (deceased) ===
(Michael Learned, 2010)

Terminal cancer patient at General Hospital. Became a friend and mentor to Elizabeth Webber. Eventually succumbed to her illness.

=== Suzanne Smith (deceased) ===
(mentioned character)

Murdered by Ryan Chamberlain.

=== Zander Smith (deceased) ===
(Marc Brett, 2000)
(Chad Brannon, 2000–04, 2021)

Son of Cameron Lewis. Ex-husband of Emily Quartermaine. Ex-lover of Elizabeth Webber and Gia Campbell. Fathered a son, Cameron, with Elizabeth Webber. Responsible for the Port Charles Hotel fire in 2004. Fatally shot by police. Returned as a ghost to help his son Cameron deal with Franco's death.

=== Iris Sneed ===
(Mary Stein, 2006)
(Wendy Braun, 2006–08)

Administrator at General Hospital.

=== Soliski ===
(Jeff Wolfe, 2025-present)

Hitman

=== Filomena Soltini (deceased) ===
(Argentina Brunetti, 1985–88)

Housekeeper of Anna Devane and Duke Lavery. Surrogate grandmother of Robin Scorpio. Murdered by Grant Putnam.

=== Jade Soong ===
(Tia Carrere, 1985–87)

Granddaughter of evil mastermind Wu. Sister of Kim. Married to Dr. Yank Se Chung. Aunt of Brad Cooper.

=== Kim Soong (deceased) ===
(Steven Leigh, 1985)

Grandson of evil mastermind Wu. Brother of Jade. Worked for Wu. Biological father of Brad Cooper. Killed by Dr. Yank Se Chung to save Frisco Jones

=== Joseph Sorel (deceased) ===
(Joe Marinelli, 2000–01)

Gangster. Rival of Sonny Corinthos. Father of Angel Sorel Ellis, who later killed him.

=== Elena Soto ===
(Krizia Bajos, 2019)

=== Aiden Spencer ===
(Adrian and Brett Ritter, 2010–11)
(Maximo & Finbar, 2011)
(Titus Jackson, 2011–12)
(Jason David, 2012–21)
(Enzo De Angelis, 2021-2024)
(Tristan Riggs, 2024)
(Colin Cassidy, 2024-present)

Son of Lucky Spencer and Elizabeth Webber. Originally believed to be the son of Nikolas Cassadine. Part of the Spencer family and Hardy/Webber family. Maternal half-brother of Cameron Spencer and Jake Spencer.

=== Bobbie Spencer (deceased) ===
(Jacklyn Zeman, 1977–2010, 2013–23)

Nurse and former prostitute. Sister of Luke Spencer. Ex-wife of D. L. Brock, Jake Meyer, Tony Jones, and Stefan Cassadine. Mother of Carly Corinthos. Adoptive mother of Barbara Jean "B.J." Jones and Lucas Jones. Part of the Spencer family.

=== Cameron Spencer ===
(Ashwyn Bagga, 2005–06)
(Braeden Walkes, 2006–12)
(Michael Leone, 2013–18)
(Anthony Saliba, temp. 2013)
(Cade McWatt, 2018)
(William Lipton, 2018–)

Son of Elizabeth Webber. Biological son of Zander Smith. Adopted by Lucky Spencer. Half-brother of Jake and Aiden Spencer.

=== Jacob Spencer (also Webber) ===
(Landon and Trey, 2007)
(Amanda, Miranda, and Maryssa Jones, 2007)
(Edward and James Nigbor, 2007–11)
(James Nigbor, 2015–16)
(Hudson West, 2016–19, 2021–)

Biological son of Jason Morgan and Elizabeth Webber. Legal son of Lucky Spencer. Maternal half-brother of Cameron Spencer and Aiden Spencer. Paternal half-brother of Danny Morgan. Part of the Hardy/Webber family, Spencer family, and Quartermaine family. Supposedly died in 2011 of injuries sustained in a hit-and-run car accident. Revealed alive in 2015 after being held captive by Helena Cassadine for 5 years.

=== Laura Spencer Collins ===
(Stacey Baldwin, 1974–76)
(Genie Francis, 1977–84, 1993–2002, 2006, 2008, 2013, 2015–)

Ex-wife of Scott Baldwin and Luke Spencer. Mother of Nikolas Cassadine, Lucky Spencer and Lulu Spencer. Grandmother of Spencer Cassadine, Aiden Spencer, Rocco Falconeri and Charlotte Cassadine. Step-grandmother of Cameron and Jake. Daughter of Lesley Webber and Gordon Grey. Step-daughter of Rick Webber. Half-sister of Martin Grey and Cyrus Renault. Member of the Spencer family and adopted member of the Hardy/Webber family. Currently Mayor of Port Charles. Married to Kevin Collins.

=== Lena Eckert Spencer (deceased) ===
(portrayed in flashbacks by Laura Wright, 2015)

Mother of Patricia Spencer, Luke Spencer and Bobbie Spencer. Abused by her husband, Tim. Killed in an accident when Luke (portrayed in flash back by Joey Luthman), defending his mother with a baseball bat against his father, hits his mother. Dies from trauma to her brain.

=== Luke Spencer (deceased) ===
(Anthony Geary, 1978–84, 1993–2015, 2017; portrayed in flashbacks by Guy Wilson (2006) and Joey Luthman (2015).)

Part of the Spencer family. Ex-husband of Laura Spencer and Tracy Quartermaine. Father of Lucky Spencer, Lulu Spencer, and Ethan Lovett. Sworn enemy of the Cassadine family, most notably Helena Cassadine. Brother of Bobbie Spencer and nephew of Ruby Anderson. Longtime friend of mobster Sonny Corinthos and WSB agent Robert Scorpio and Anna Devane. Spencer died in an off-screen cable car accident caused by Victor Cassadine in early 2022.

=== Lucas "Lucky" Lorenzo Spencer Jr. ===
(Jonathan Jackson, 1993–99, 2009–11, 2015, 2024-2025)
(Jacob Young, 2000–03)
(Greg Vaughan, 2003–09)

Son of Luke and Laura. Brother of Lulu Spencer. Half-brother of Nikolas Cassadine and Ethan Lovett. Part of the Spencer family. Ex-husband of Elizabeth Webber; widowed by Siobhan McKenna. Biological father of Aiden Spencer with Elizabeth. Legal father to Elizabeth's son Jake Webber. Adoptive father of Elizabeth's son Cameron Webber. Ex-lover of Sarah Webber, Summer Halloway, Maxie Jones, and Sam McCall. Left Port Charles in 2011.

=== Patricia "Pat" Spencer (deceased) ===
(Dee Wallace, portrayed in a flashback by Chloe Lanier, 2015)

Sister of Bobbie and Luke. Mother of Valerie Spencer. Suffers from MS. Died of complications from MS after being reunited with her siblings.

=== Tim Spencer (deceased) ===
(portrayed in a flashback by Anthony Geary, 2015)

Father of Patricia Spencer, Luke Spencer and Bobbie Spencer. Alcoholic who abused his family. Disappeared from his children's lives years before. Later revealed that Luke killed his father in a rage, and his body was hidden by Pat to spare Luke.

=== Valerie Spencer ===
(Brytni Sarpy, 2015–19)
(Paulina Lule, 2019–20)

Daughter of Patricia Spencer. Officer at the PCPD.

=== Damian Spinelli ===
(Bradford Anderson, 2006–;Blake Berris, temp. 2017)

Computer hacker working as a private investigator. Worked for Lorenzo Alcazar, Jason Morgan, aka Stonecold, and Sonny Corinthos. Good friends of Sam McCall and Jason. Ex-lover of Jolene Crowell, Maxie Jones, and Ellie Trout. Speaks his own language, giving the people he encounters nicknames. Father of Georgie Spinelli.

=== Georgie Spinelli ===
(Elle and Eve Tanz, 2013)
(Londyn and Teagan, 2013–14)
(Harper Barash, 2015)
(Lily Fisher, 2017–)

Daughter of Maxie Jones and Damian Spinelli. Maternal half-sister of James West, and Bailey Louise Jones. Initially raised as the daughter of Lulu Spencer and Dante Falconeri. Raised by her father in Portland.

=== Olivia St. John (deceased) ===
(Tonja Walker, 1988–90, 2017)

Daughter of crime boss Victor Jerome. Sister of Julian Jerome, and Evan Jerome Sr.; paternal half-sister of Dino Antoinelli and Ava Jerome. Stalked Duke Lavery. Supposedly killed by her brother Julian. Revealed to be alive in 2017, and running the Jerome mob business. Was caught and sent to D'Archam Asylum.

=== Cheryl Stansbury (deceased) ===
(Jennifer Anglin, 1988–92)

Also known as Loretta Marie Crumholz. Sister of Tiffany Hill. Biological mother of Lucas Jones with Julian Jerome. Dated Robert Scorpio and had a crush on Shep Casey. Died in a car accident.

=== Suzanne Stanwyck ===
(Adrienne Barbeau, 2010–11)

Real name is Stephanie Wayne. Founder of the ASEC, working with Brenda Barrett. Wife of Theo Hoffman, also known as The Balkan, and the mother of Aleksander Janáček. Grandmother of Alec Scott. Sent to prison for various crimes.

=== General Stark ===
(J. G. Hertzler, 1990)

Held General Hospital hostage in 1990 in order to get the bank account number of his country's president. Was the boss of Rico Chacone. Arrested while trying to escape the hospital after obtaining the bank account number.

=== Russell Stern ===
(Beau Billingslea, 2011)

Professor

=== Elaine Stevens ===
(Judy Kain, 2024–present)

Private Investigator

=== Joel Stratton ===
(Barry Coe, 1973–74; Rod McCary, 1974–76)

Involved with Lesley Williams. Brother to Owen.

=== Owen Stratton (deceased) ===
(Joel Marston, 1973–76)

Brother to Joel.

=== Buzz Stryker (deceased) ===
(Don Galloway, 1985–87)

Doctor at General Hospital. Best friend of Jimmy Lee Holt. Briefly dated Anna Devane until Duke Lavery came to town. One of Robin Scorpio's three godfathers.

=== Sandy Stryker ===
(Yvette Nipar, 1986–87)

Daughter of Buzz Stryker.

=== Suki ===
(Dustin Nguyen, 1985)

Grandson of Olin. Helped Frisco Jones, Sean Donely and Robert Scorpio find Robin Scorpio and the black pearls in the Asian Quarter in 1985.

=== Grace Sullivan (deceased) ===
(Lisa Lord, 1997–99)

Nurse at General Hospital. Strangled by serial killer Greg Cooper.

=== Holly Sutton-Scorpio ===
(Emma Samms, 1982–85, 1992–93, 2006, 2009, 2012–13, 2015, 2020, 2022–2024)

Con artist. Daughter of Mary and Charles Sutton. Former wife of Robert Scorpio. Mother of Ethan Lovett with Luke Spencer and Sasha Gilmore with Robert. Grandmother of Liam Corbin, Daisy Gilmore, and Phoebe Wilson. Former stepmother of Robin Scorpio. Dated Luke Spencer and Bill Eckert.

=== Lou Swenson (deceased) ===
(Danielle Von Zerneck, 1983–84)

Girlfriend of Blackie Parrish. Died of head injury.

== T ==
=== Marcus Taggert ===
(Réal Andrews, 1996–2003, 2020–)
(Mathew St. Patrick, 1997)
(Asante Jones, 2020–22)

Former detective for the Port Charles Police Department. Son of Florence Campbell. Half-brother of Gia Campbell. Father of Trina Robinson. Returned to Port Charles to help former DEA partner, current Police Commissioner Ashford with the suspicious overdose deaths of former agents. Supposedly died of a gunshot wound received rescuing Trina and Cameron Webber kidnapped by Cyrus Renault's men and women. Hidden to protect his family from Cyrus Renault. Revealed to be alive and waiting to be tried for framing Cyrus Renault.

=== Willow Tait ===
(Katelyn MacMullen, 2018–)

Born Kali Miller. Former member of Dawn of Day. Biological Daughter of Silas Clay and Nina Reeves, twin sister of Nelle Benson, and half-sister of Kiki Jerome. Mother of Wiley Cooper-Jones (deceased) and Amelia Corinthos. Adoptive mother of Wiley Corinthos. Ex-wife of Michael Corinthos and Harrison Chase. Lost custody of her children to Michael.

=== Jennifer Talbot (deceased) ===
(Carol Bruce, 1985)
(Martha Scott, 1985–86)

Strangled by Kevin O'Connor. Grandmother to Terry Brock. Left half her estate to Kevin.

=== Leopold Taub (deceased) ===
(Charles "Chip" Lucia, 1991)

Killed Avery Stanton. Married Irene Stanton. Forced Dominique Stanton into marrying him. Shot and killed by Robert Scorpio.

=== Diana Taylor (deceased) ===
(Valerie Starrett, 1969–77)
(Davey Davison, temp. 1977)
(Brooke Bundy, 1977–81)

Sister of Beth Maynard. Mother of Tracy and Martha Taylor. Marries Peter Taylor and is briefly engaged to Owen Stratton. Dates Phil Brewer and Joel Stratton. Accidentally killed by Alice Grant.

=== Peter Taylor (deceased) ===
(Paul Carr, 1967)
(Craig Huebing, 1969–79)

Psychiatrist at General Hospital. Foster parent of Steven Webber. Married to Diana Taylor and Jessie Brewer.

=== Jackie Templeton ===
(Demi Moore, 1982–84)
(Kim Delaney, 2020–)

Investigative reporter who had earlier interviewed Laura Spencer, showed up in Port Charles looking for her sister Laura Templeton at the same time that Laura Spencer had been kidnapped by Stavros Cassadine. Was involved with Robert Scorpio until he married Holly Sutton-Scorpio. Jackie was involved in investigating the Susan Moore murder, and remained vindictive towards Robert and Holly in several of his investigations before leaving Port Charles in early 1984. Returned to town in 2020 and is revealed to be Harrison Chase's mother and Hamilton Finn's step-mother.

=== Laura Templeton ===
(Janine Turner, 1982–83)

A pretty blonde who dated Mel, the photographer who was taking pictures of Laura Spencer. Disappeared when two other Lauras disappeared. Sister of Jackie. She dated both Blackie Parrish and Scott Baldwin, but left town after discovering that Scott was having an affair with Heather Webber.

=== The Ancient One ===
(Keye Luke, 1985)

Older Chinese man from the Asian Quarter who helped his people win their freedom. Became friends with Robin Scorpio. Grandfather of Yank Se and Tei Chung.

=== The Body ===
(Michael Garfield, 2011)

Subject/photography model for Robert "Franco" Frank in his loft as he prepared to interrupt the wedding of Jason Morgan and Sam McCall.

=== Asher Thomas (deceased) ===
(Larry Poindexter, 2005)

Doctor at General Hospital. Attempted to murder A. J. Quartermaine and Jason Morgan. Shot and killed by Jason Morgan.

=== Randall Thompson ===
(Chuck Wagner, 1981–82)

Secretary at ELQ.

=== Regina Thompson ===
(Angel M. Wainwright, 2007–08)

=== Cole Thornhart (deceased) ===
(Brandon Buddy, 2006–10)
(Van Hughes, 2012)

Former One Life to Live character. Boyfriend of Starr Manning. Was killed in a car accident coming into Port Charles with his daughter, Hope Manning Thornhart and Starr Manning was also in the car but escaped. Anthony Zacchara was driving the other car trying to escape after having his tire shot out.

=== Crane Tolliver (deceased) ===
(Wiley Harker, 1983)

Once married to Lila Quartermaine. Blackmailed the Quartermaines. Murdered Susan Moore. In 2012, it was revealed that A. J. Quartermaine had been living under the alias "Crane Tolliver" since 2008 to keep people from finding out he was alive.

=== Ellen "Ellie" Trout ===
(Emily Wilson, 2012–16, 2022)

Lab technician at General Hospital. Known for her quirky personality and sharp medical expertise. Dated Damian Spinelli. Left town with Spinelli and his daughter, Georgie. Recently broke up with Spinelli due to his association with Jason Morgan and Sonny Corinthos.

=== Evan Tucker (deceased) ===
(Kevin McClatchy, 2005)

Married to Reese Marshall. Father of Jamie Tucker. Shot and killed by Ric Lansing in self-defense.

=== Justine Turner ===
(Nazneen Contractor, 2024, 2025)

Assistant district attorney and acting district attorney.

== V ==
=== Nicolas Van Buren (deceased) ===
(Joseph Mascolo, 1989)

AKA Domino. Involved into Frisco's "death".

=== Real Van Gelder ===
(George Ball, 1982)

=== S. Vaughn ===
(Bryce Durfee, 2025-present)

WSB Handler

=== Roz Venta ===
(Nawal Bengholam, 2019, 2022)

Attorney for the late Victor Cassadine.

=== Mo Verde ===
(Jordi Caballero, 2009)

=== Vince ===
(Michael Cade, 1997)

=== Amy Vining (deceased) ===
(Cari Ann Warder, 1975)
(Shell Kepler (deceased), 1979–2002)

Nurse at General Hospital. Daughter of Jason and Barbara Vining. Grew up believing Laura Webber Spencer is her sister due to Laura and Barbara Vining's stillborn daughter being switched at birth. Remained very close to Laura and went to live with Laura's family after they are reunited. Always there for Laura and her children. Last seen on-screen in September 2002 before Luke and Laura's planned wedding.

=== Barbara Vining (deceased) ===
(Judy Lewis, 1975–76, 1978)

Mother of Amy Vining. Widow of Jason Vining. Adopted Laura as a baby.

=== Jason Vining (deceased) ===
(Richard Rust, 1975)
(Jonathan Carter, 1975–76)

Father of Amy Vining. Married to Barbara Vining.

=== Vinnie ===
(Johnny Palermo, 2007)

=== Wilhelm Von Schlagel ===
(Bruce Davison, 2010)

== W ==
=== Chad Wainwright ===
(Casey Biggs, 1990)

=== Dusty Walker ===
(Shaun Cassidy, 1987)

Singer. Friend of Blackie Parrish and Frisco Jones. Brainwashed by Elena Cosgrove. Dated Terry Brock.

=== Lynda Walker (deceased) ===
(mentioned character)

Murder victim of Ryan Chamberlain; was engaged to him in Texas.

=== Taylor Wallace ===
(Daniel Cummings, 2010–11)

Classmate of Kristina Davis and Michael Corinthos. Study partner and brief love interest to Kristina. Accompanies her on the ski trip that results in the 2010 bus crash.

=== Claire Walsh ===
(Dahlia Salem, 2010–11)

Federal prosecutor who came to Port Charles to prosecute Sonny Corinthos for the murder of Claudia Zacchara. Lover of Sonny Corinthos. Works with Alexis Davis and Diane Miller before moving to Alaska.

=== David Walters ===
(Bennet Guillory, 2013–14)
(William Allen Young, 2014–15, 2019)

Federal judge who presided over the custody hearings of Georgie Spinelli and Avery Corinthos, and later Wiley Cooper-Jones. Dated Monica Quartermaine.

=== Bradley Ward (deceased) ===
(Aaron Seville, 1994–96)

Illegitimate son of Edward Quartermaine and Mary Mae Ward. Raised as the son of stepfather, Dan Ward. Husband of Isobel Ward. Father of Justus and Faith Ward. Murdered in 1974 by Jack Boland.

=== Dan Ward (deceased) ===
(Mentioned character)

Second husband of Mary Mae Ward. Father of David and Idios Ward; stepfather of Bradley Ward. Dies in June 1969, approximately two months before his step granddaughter, Faith's birth.

=== David Ward ===
(Rif Hutton, 1995)

Son of Mary Mae Ward and Dan Ward. Maternal half-brother of Bradley Ward. Husband of Margaret Ward. Comes to Port Charles from Philadelphia at the request of his daughter, Keesha, to meet her boyfriend Jason Quartermaine.

=== Faith Ward ===
(April Weeden-Washington, 1994)
(Faith Collins, 1995–96)

Daughter of Bradley and Isobel Ward. Sister of Justus Ward. Faith comes to town in 1994 for her father's memorial service but immediately leaves and wants nothing to do with the Quartermaine family. In 2010, her daughter, Maya Ward, comes to Port Charles to live with Edward Quartermaine.

=== Idios Ward ===
(Joyce Douglas, 1994, 1996)

Comes to town briefly for Mary Mae and Bradley's funerals. Daughter of Mary Mae and Dan Ward. Sister of David and maternal half-sister of Bradley Ward.

=== Isobel Ward ===
(Michelle Davison, 1994)

Widow of Bradley Ward. Mother of Justus and Faith Ward and grandmother to Maya Ward.

=== Justus Ward (deceased) ===
(Joseph C. Phillips, 1994–98)
(Monti Sharp, 1998–99)
(M'fundo Morrison, 2003–06)

Oldest child of Bradley and Isobel Ward. Grandson of Edward Quartermaine and Mary Mae Ward. Brother of Faith Ward. Attorney for his cousin, Jason Morgan, and Sonny Corinthos. Once engaged to Simone Hardy. Lover of Faith Rosco. Briefly dates Lainey Winters. Killed by Manny Ruiz.

=== Keesha Ward ===
(Senait Ashenafi, 1994–98)

Cousin of Justus Ward. Daughter of David and Margaret Ward. Dates Jason Quartermaine before the car accident that erases his memory. Briefly gets involved with A. J. Quartermaine.

=== Margaret Ward ===
(Karlotta Nelson, 1994, 1996)

Comes to town in 1994 and 1996 for Bradley and Mary Mae's funerals. Wife of David Ward. Mother of Roy and Keesha Ward. Lives in Philadelphia.

=== Mary Mae Ward (deceased) ===
(Rosalind Cash, 1994–95)

Jazz singer. Owned and ran the Bradley Ward House. Mother of Bradley Ward, David Ward and Idios Ward. Widow of Buddy Powers and Dan Ward. Grandmother to Keesha Ward, Faith Ward and Justus Ward. Great-grandmother to Maya Ward. Close friends with Laura Spencer.

=== Maya Ward ===
(Annie Ilonzeh, 2010–11)

Medical intern at General Hospital. Daughter of Faith Ward. Comes to Port Charles in 2010 to live with her great-grandfather Edward Quartermaine. Gained custody of her little sister Zoe shortly after the death of her stepmother. Ex-wife of Ethan Lovett.

=== Roy Ward ===
(Reginald Harper, 1994, 1996)

Comes to town briefly for the funerals of Bradley Ward and Mary Mae Ward. Son of David Ward and his wife Margaret. Brother of Keesha Ward.

=== Zoe Richardson ===
(Mentioned Character)

Half Sister of Maya Ward. Maya Ward gained custody over her when Maya's stepmother (Zoe's mom) died.

=== Ida Warren (deceased) ===
(Kathryn Joosten, 2002–03)

Paid by Coleman Ratcliffe to say she saw Brenda Barrett murder Luis Alcazar.

=== Randy Washburn ===
(Mark Miller, 1964)

A malaria patient who has a romance with Audrey March.

=== Rupert Watson ===
(Patrick Cox, 2018)

=== Elizabeth Webber ===
(Rebecca Herbst, 1997–)
(Martha Madison, temp. 2011)

Nurse at General Hospital. Daughter of Jeff Webber and Carolyn Webber. Paternal half sister of Steven Webber and Hayden Barnes; full sister of Sarah Webber. Mother of Cameron Spencer with Zander Smith, Jake Spencer with Jason Morgan and Aiden Spencer with Lucky Spencer. Ex-wife of Ric Lansing and Lucky Spencer. Widow of Franco Baldwin. Later in a relationship with Hamilton Finn until his alcoholism sabotaged their relationship.

=== Heather Webber ===
(Georganne LaPiere, 1976–77)
(Mary O'Brien, 1977–79)
(Robin Mattson, 1980–83, 2004, 2012–16)
(Alley Mills, 2022–23)

Mother of Steven Webber and Robert "Franco" Frank (with Scott Baldwin). Mother of Esme Prince (with Ryan Chamberlain). Cousin and life coach of Susan Moore. Previously married to Jeff Webber and Edward Quartermaine. Step-grandmother of Cameron, Aiden, and Jake Spencer by her son Franco's marriage to Elizabeth Webber. Sent to a mental institution after attempting to kill Edward in 2004, and was temporarily released in 2012. Later sent back to Ferncliff, then Miscavige. Went on killing spree in 2022 as a serial killer known as "The Hook" to avenge mistreatment of Esme. Eventually, she was exonerated when it was discovered that metallosis from a bad hip replacement was responsible for her crimes, and she moved to Arizona with her son Steven.

=== Helene Webber (deceased) ===
(Mentioned character)

Former lover of Steve Hardy. Wife of Lars Webber. Mother of Rick Webber, Jeff Webber and Terri Webber. On her death bed, she revealed to Terri that Jeff was Steve's son.

=== Jeff Webber ===
(Richard Dean Anderson, 1976–81)
(William R. Moses, 2022)

Son of Steve Hardy and Helene Webber. Brother of Rick Webber. Father of Steven Webber, Sarah Webber, Elizabeth Webber and Hayden Barnes. Husband of Carolyn Webber, ex-husband of Monica Quartermaine and Heather Webber.

=== Lars Webber (deceased) ===
(Mentioned character)

Husband of Helene Webber. Father of Rick Webber and Terri Webber. Formerly believed to be the father of Jeff Webber until it was revealed that he wasn't.

=== Lesley Webber ===
(Denise Alexander, 1973–84, 1996–2009, 2013, 2017, 2019, 2021)

Mother of Laura Spencer. Grandmother to Nikolas Cassadine, Lucky Spencer and Lulu Spencer. Marries Rick Webber. Presumed to have been killed in a car crash in 1984 but kept rehabilitated by Stefan Cassadine. AKA Lesley Williams. Was also married to Cameron Faulkner. Had an affair with Gordon Grey (father of Laura Spencer).

=== Mike Webber ===
(David Mendenhall, 1980–86)

Adoptive son of Rick Webber and Lesley Webber. Biological son of Derek Barrington and Ginny Blake.

=== Rick Webber (deceased) ===
(Michael Gregory, 1976–78)
(Chris Robinson, 1978–86, 2002, 2013)

Son of Lars Webber and Helene Webber. Half-brother of Jeff Webber. Brother of Terri Webber Arnett. Marries Lesley Webber and Ginny Blake Webber. Father of Rick Webber Jr. Adoptive father of Mike Webber. Stepfather of Laura Spencer. Murdered by Scott Baldwin.

=== Richard "Rick" Webber Jr. ===
(C. Balme, 1986)

Son of Rick and Ginny.

=== Sarah Webber ===
(Jennifer Sky, 1997–98)
(Sarah Lainey, 2002)

Daughter of Jeff Webber and Carolyn Webber. Paternal half-sister of Steven Webber and Hayden Barnes and sister of Elizabeth Webber. Dates Nikolas Cassadine and Lucky Spencer. Moves to northern California.

=== Steven Lars "Steve" Webber ===
(Robert Beitzel, 1977)
(Martin Hewitt, 1979–81)
(Shaun Benson, 2004–05)
(Scott Reeves, 2009–13)

Only son of Jeff Webber and Heather Webber. Half-brother of Robert "Franco" Frank, Elizabeth Webber, Sarah Webber and Hayden Barnes. Engaged to Olivia Falconeri. Went to prison in Memphis, Tennessee on a murder charge.

=== Terri Webber ===
(Bobbi Jordan, 1976–77)

=== Al Weeks ===
(Tom Brown, 1963–66, 1970–74)

Part of the original cast, Al Weeks is father of Eddie Weeks. He is the custodian at General Hospital and marries Lucille March.

=== Eddie Weeks ===
(Craig Curtis, 1963)
(Doug Lambert, 1964–66)

Part of the original cast, Eddie is the driver of a car accident that puts Angie Costello in the hospital. They conceive an illegitimate child which they give up for adoption to the Flemings, then kidnap the baby after they marry. Eddie is the son of Al Weeks and ex-boyfriend of Dorothy Bradley.

=== Lenore Weeks ===
(Lenore Kingston, 1963–65)

Part of the original cast.

=== Lucille March Weeks (deceased) ===
(Lucille Wall, 1963–76, 1982)
(Mary Grace Canfield, temp. 1973)

Head nurse at General Hospital. Sister of Audrey March Hardy. Wife of Al Weeks.

=== Samantha Welles ===
(Dawn Merrick, 1985–89)

Police officer. Friend of Frisco Jones.

=== James West ===
(Sally Brown, 2018)
(Marciano twins, 2018–19)
(Kyler and Caleb Ends, 2019)
(Owen and Curtis Rufca, 2019)
Gary James Fuller (2023-)

Son of Nathan West and Maxie Jones. Maternal half-brother of Georgie Spinelli and Bailey Louise Jones.

=== Nathan West ===
(Ryan Paevey, 2013–18; 2025-)

Born James Nathan Reeves. Biological son of Liesl Obrecht and Cesar Faison. Brother of Britt Westbourne and half-brother of Peter August. Raised by his aunt Madeline Reeves. Assumed brother and actual cousin of Nina Reeves. Detective for the Port Charles Police Department. Husband of Maxie Jones. Father of James West. Presumed to be shot to death by his father, Cesar Faison. Returned to life in September 2025.

=== Britt Westbourne ===
(Kelly Thiebaud, 2012–15, 2017–18, 2020–23, 2025-)

Daughter of Cesar Faison and Liesl Obrecht. Sister of Nathan West. Cousin of Nina Reeves. Dated Patrick Drake and Jason Morgan. Formerly engaged to Nikolas Cassadine. Surrogate mother of Rocco Falconeri. Went on the run with Faison for a few years before turning herself into the police. Friends with Brad Cooper. OB-GYN doctor and former Co-Chief of Staff at General Hospital. Died after being stabbed by the Hook later revealed to be Heather Webber. Revealed to be alive in 2025.

=== Karen Wexler (deceased) ===
(Cari Shayne, 1992–95)
(Jennifer Hammon, 1997–99 (on Port Charles))
(Marie Wilson, 1999–2003)

Daughter of Scott Baldwin and Rhonda Wexler. Granddaughter of Lee and Gail Baldwin. Half-sister of Robert "Franco" Frank, Logan Hayes, Serena Baldwin and Christina Baldwin. Dated Jason Quartermaine. Former wife of Jagger Cates. Killed in a car accident in 2003.

=== Rhonda Wexler ===
(Denise Galik-Furey, 1992–94)

Recovering alcoholic. Mother of Karen Wexler.

=== Delilah Wilson (deceased) ===
(Lily Cardone, 2026)

Former flame of Ethan Lovett and the mother of Phoebe Wilson. Died from complications of internal bleeding due to supraventricular tachycardia following a c-section.

=== Phoebe Wilson ===
(Lucia and Luna Creighton, 2026-present)

Daughter of Ethan Lovett and Delilah Wilson. Granddaughter of Luke Spencer and Holly Sutton. Foster daughter of Brook Lynn Quartermaine and Harrison Chase. Part of the Spencer family.

=== Agnes Whittaker ===
(Beth Peters, 1980–83, 1994)

Wife of Whit Whittaker. Friends of Luke and Laura. Helps Luke and Laura with their wedding. Rents a room for Luke and Laura when they are on the run in 1980.

=== Kate Whittaker ===
(Lara Jill Miller, 2002)

=== Whit Whittaker (deceased) ===
(Hank Underwood, 1980–83)

Husband of Agnes Whitaker. Plays poker with Mom and Pop Calhoon.

=== Veronica Wilding (deceased) ===
(Jennifer Hetrick, 1998)

Former lover of Harlan Barrett. Mother of Brenda Barrett.

=== Mitch Williams ===
(Christopher Pennock, 1979–80)

District Attorney. Runs for State Senate. Briefly marries Tracy Quartermaine.

=== Willow ===
(Katelyn Pacitto, 2010)

Friend of Kiefer Bauer and Ashton who bullied Kristina Davis.

=== Bunny Willis ===
(Beau Kazer, 1983, 1999)

Doctor

=== Gloria Wilson (deceased) ===
(mentioned character)

Her murder by Ryan Chamberlain was witnessed by Felicia Jones.

=== Denise Wilton ===
(Julie Adams, 1969)

=== Louise Elaine "Lainey" Winters ===
(Kent King, 2005–10)

Psychiatrist at General Hospital. Dates Justus Ward. Roommates with colleague Kelly Lee.

=== Dawn Winthrop (deceased) ===
(Kim Valentine, 1988–89)
(Sharon Case, 1989–90)
(Lisa Fuller, 1990)
(Jennifer Guthrie, 1990–91)

Only biological daughter of David Langton and Monica Quartermaine. Maternal half-sister of A. J. Quartermaine. Adoptive maternal half-sister of Jason Morgan. Marries Ned Ashton. Engaged to Decker Moss when she dies.

=== Prunella Witherspoon ===
(Chantal Contouri, 1988–89)

Reformed con artist. Cousin of Robert Scorpio. Works at Kelly's.

=== Deke Woods (deceased) ===
(Unknown actor)

Stepfather of Sonny Corinthos. Routinely abuses both Sonny and his mother Adela. Killed by Sonny.

=== Mr. Wu ===
(Aki Aleong, 1985)

Evil mastermind behind the Asian Quarter story. Keeps citizens enslaved until Robert Scorpio and others find the black pearls (which Robin has secretly put into her doll). Grandfather of Jade and Kim Soong. Great-grandfather of Brad Cooper. Impersonated by Robert in 1985 so that he can intercept Sean Donely, who had stolen the Aztec Treasure from Felicia Jones.

=== Selena Wu ===
(Tia Carrere, 1985–87)

Granddaughter of evil mastermind Wu. Sister of Kim. Married to Dr. Yank Se Chung. Aunt of Brad Cooper.

=== Maggie Wurth (deceased) ===
(Kodi Kitchen, 2011–12)

Pediatrician at General Hospital. Had dated Steven Webber when they both lived in Memphis. Dies of a drug overdose after her tea is spiked by Heather Webber.

== Y ==
=== Grace Yang ===
(Michelle Krusiec, 2011)

Attorney and court-appointed mediator in the custody battle between Jasper Jacks and Carly Corinthos over their daughter Josslyn Jacks. Jax paid her to give him full custody of Josslyn. When Sonny discovers this, he blackmails Grace into drugging and framing Jax so Carly gets full custody of Josslyn.

=== Br Yasin ===
(Troy Caylak, 2017)

=== Mr. Yi (deceased) ===
(Jack Ong, 2011–12)

=== Robert Yi ===
(Edward Chen, 2015)

=== Yuri ===
(Cyrus Hobbi, 2021-)

Immigrant from Belarus came to Port Charles one month after the death of Franco Baldwin.

== Z ==
=== Anthony Zacchara (deceased) ===
(Bruce Weitz, 2007–12)

A ruthless and mentally unstable mob boss. Father of Claudia Zacchara. Grandfather of Johnny Zacchara. Married to Tracy Quartermaine at the time of his death. Shot and killed by Johnny in 2012.

=== Claudia Zacchara (deceased) ===
(Sarah Joy Brown, 2008–09)

Daughter of Anthony Zacchara and Domenica Zacchara. Mother of Johnny Zacchara. Ex-lover of Ric Lansing. Married to Sonny Corinthos at the time of her death. Killed by Michael Corinthos.

=== Domenica Zacchara ===
(mentioned character)

Mother of Claudia Zacchara. Grandmother of Johnny Zacchara. Ex-wife of Anthony Zacchara. Ran away to Greece fearing her husband's insanity.

=== John Anthony "Johnny" Zacchara ===
(Brandon Barash, 2007–16)

Former mob boss of the Zacchara Organization. Son of Gino Soleito and Claudia Zacchara, but raised believing Claudia was his sister. Grandson of Anthony Zacchara. Ex-lover of Lulu Spencer, Olivia Falconeri, Lisa Niles, and Carly Jacks. Married to Kate Howard, who was under the influence of her alter personality, Connie Falconeri. Sentenced to 20 years in prison for murdering Cole Thornhart, Hope Manning Thornhart, and Anthony Zacchara.

=== Maria Zacchara (deceased) ===
(mentioned character)

Ex-wife of Anthony Zacchara. Thought to be the mother of Johnny Zacchara. Murdered by Anthony in front of Johnny when he was about seven years old.

=== Dr. Zajac ===
(Travis Schuldt, 2017)

=== Jesse Zhang ===
(Linda Wang, 2002)

Registered nurse.
