= The Net 2.0 =

- DVD cover
- Directed by: Charles Winkler
- Written by: Rob Cowan
- Based on: The Net by John Brancato and Michael Ferris
- Produced by: Rob Cowan; Irwin Winkler
- Starring: Nikki DeLoach
- Cinematography: Steven Douglas Smith
- Edited by: Clayton Halsey
- Music by: Stephen Endelman
- Production company: Winkler Films
- Distributed by: Sony Pictures Home Entertainment
- Release date: February 7, 2006
- Running time: 92 minutes
- Country: United States
- Language: English

The Net 2.0 is a 2006 direct-to-video mystery thriller film written and produced by Rob Cowan and directed by Charles Winkler. It is a standalone sequel to the 1995 film The Net directed by his father Irwin Winkler (who produced this film), but has a separate and unrelated plot. The story concerns a computer systems analyst who finds herself in a web of identity theft, robbery, and murder when she lands in Turkey for a new job. It is the second installment in The Net film series.

== Plot ==
A young woman runs from her pursuers in the streets of Istanbul. She is captured and imprisoned, accused of various crimes, and questioned by Dr. Kavak. Desperate to save herself, she starts her story in a series of flashbacks.

Hope Cassidy, a young computer systems analyst looking for excitement in her life, accepts a well-paying job in Istanbul at Suzer International, where she will begin by securing the Internet network of a Russian company. She tries to convince her boyfriend, James, to go with her, but he is reluctant and she breaks off their relationship. While she is talking to him at a café, her laptop crashes and then reloads, a small incident she ignores.

While flying alone the next day, she checks her bank account online. Stewardess Roxelena serves her champagne and gives her a bracelet as a gift. As they talk, the money in her accounts drops to zero. When Hope arrives in Istanbul Airport, she is told by the immigration officer that she has a tourist visa, which cannot be used for working purposes, and is advised to go to the American consulate in order to have her soon-expiring passport renewed. Exiting the airport, Hope is approached by a taxi driver who takes her to the Sultanahmet Palace Hotel in Istanbul, where he says the Americans love to stay. Hope gets a room and as soon as she lies down the fire alarm rings, forcing everyone to evacuate. Hope is told that the guests will have to stay out for almost an hour. Hope then meets an American known as Z.Z. Jackson. They take a walk in the park and come across a merchant selling scarves.

When Hope returns to her hotel room to get her passport, she discovers the new one issued by the American consulate contains the wrong name. It seems that her identity has been stolen. She visits the company that has offered her the job, but finds that Z.Z. is working there under the name Hope Cassidy. She discovers $40,000,000 in her bank account and certain people are out to kill her. All people who knew her are found dead, including the taxi driver whom she met at the airport, who turns out to be a police officer. The police and Dr. Kavak do not believe her explanations, and accuse her of murdering the taxi driver and the woman now impersonating her, Z.Z.. After an incident during Hope's interrogation, she is given an injection which puts her to sleep. She then wakes up in a hotel room with her boyfriend, James, at her side. He tries to reassure her that everything has been sorted out, but something in his speech makes her suspicious.

He and Dr. Kavak turn out to be behind the conspiracy against her, because they wanted her skills in order to have money embezzled from Ivanakov, a Russian arms dealer. Hope is taken to the bank in order to withdraw the money, but they are confronted by the Russians on their way out. Hope appears to be killed in the conflict but awakens in the ambulance, having staged her own death so that the mafia would stop hunting her. By her side is Roxelena, who is actually an Interpol agent and reveals that thanks to the bracelet she gave her in the airplane (which was in fact a homing beacon), Hope's whereabouts were known to the police at all times. She leaves Istanbul with a new identity, enjoying her first class flight back home, in front of her laptop screen that reveals a bank account balance of five million dollars.

== Cast ==
- Nikki DeLoach as Hope Cassidy
- Keegan Connor Tracy as Z.Z. Jackson
- Neil Hopkins as James Haven
- Demet Akbağ as Dr. Kavak
- Şebnem Dönmez as Roxelena
- Güven Kıraç as Osman
- Halit Ergenç as Ivanakov
- Mehmet Ergen as Ibrahim Zoralan

== Reception ==
Brent Simon of IGN rated it 5/10 stars and wrote that because DeLoach does not imbue her character with the same "sympathetic girl-next-door imperilment" that Bullock did, the sequel is pointless. Jeffrey Robinson of DVD Talk rated it 1.5/5 stars and wrote that it "is more likely to put you to sleep than keep you on the edge of your seat".

== See also ==
- List of films featuring surveillance
