= Golden Reel Award for Outstanding Achievement in Sound Editing – Musical for Feature Film =

Award for sound editors working on films

- Country: United States
- Presented by: Motion Picture Sound Editors
- Currently held by: Allegra De Souza, Jon Mooney, Peter Oso Snell – Eurovision Song Contest: The Story of Fire Saga (2020)

The Golden Reel Award for Outstanding Achievement in Sound Editing – Musical for Feature Film was an annual award presented by the Motion Picture Sound Editors. It honored music editors whose work demonstrates exceptional merit in the field of cinema, specifically in musical feature films. It was first awarded in 1999, for films released the previous year, under the title Best Sound Editing – Music – Musical Feature (Foreign & Domestic).

In 2002, the phrase "Foreign & Domestic" was removed from its title, and the award became known as Best Sound Editing – Music – Musical Feature Film. This title, along with minor variations, remained in use until 2017. From 2018, the award was presented under the title, Outstanding Achievement in Sound Editing – Musical for Feature Film. The award has not been awarded since 2020.

== Winners and nominees ==
=== 1990s ===
Best Sound Editing – Music – Musical Feature (Foreign & Domestic)

Year	Film	Winners/Nominees
1998	Hilary and Jackie	Robert Hathaway (music editor)
1998	Blues Brothers 2000	George A. Martin (supervising music editor)
1998	Dance with Me	Daryl B. Kell (supervising music editor)
1998	Little Voice	Andy Glen (music editor)
1998	Still Crazy	Dina Eaton (music editor)
1998	Tango	
1998	Velvet Goldmine	Annette Kudrak (music editor); Todd Kasow (scoring editor)
1998	The Wedding Singer	Scott Grusin, Stephen Lotwis (music editors)
1999	The Red Violin	Todd Kasow (music editor); Claude La Haye (re-recording mixer)
1999	Bandits	
1999	Music of the Heart	Bill Abbott (music/scoring editor)
1999	Sweet and Lowdown	Alisa Lepselter (music editor)
1999	Topsy-Turvy	Michael Connell (music/scoring editor); Denise Connell (music editor)

=== 2000s ===
Year	Film	Winners/Nominees
2000	Almost Famous	Carlton Kaller (music/scoring editor)
2000	Billy Elliot	
2000	Bring It On	Fernand Bos (music/scoring editor)
2000	Coyote Ugly	Shannon Erbe (music editor)
2000	Dancer in the Dark	Valgeir Sigurðsson (music editor/music mixer/music programmer/music recordist)
2000	Love's Labour's Lost	Gerard McCann (music/scoring editor)
2000	Orfeu	Mark Jan Wlodarkiewicz (music/scoring editor)

Best Sound Editing – Music – Musical Feature Film

Year	Film	Winners/Nominees
2001	Moulin Rouge!	Simon Leadley (supervising music editor/scoring editor); Tim Ryan, Lee Scott (music editors); Christine H. Luethje (music editor/music editing co-ordinator); Stephen Lotwis, Danielle Wiessner (vocal editors)
2001	Captain Corelli's Mandolin	Andy Glen (music editor)
2001	Glitter	Michael Dittrick, Todd Bozung, Bruce Nyznik (music editors)
2001	Josie and the Pussycats	Angie Rubin (music editor)
2001	Lucky Break	Tony Lewis, James Bellamy (music editors)
2001	Rock Star	Robert Schaper (supervising music editor); Brent Brooks (music editor)
2001	Save the Last Dance	Michael T. Ryan (music editor)
2002	Chicago	Annette Kudrak (supervising music editor); E. Gedney Webb (music editor); Ellen Segal (music/scoring editor); Kenton Jakub, Missy Cohen (vocal editors)
2002	8 Mile	Carlton Kaller (music editor)
2002	8 Women	Benoît Hillebrant (music/scoring editor)
2002	Drumline	Lee Scott, Nicholas Meyers, Mick Gormaley (music editors); Bunny Andrews (music/scoring editor)
2002	Queen of the Damned	Will Kaplan (music/scoring editor); Jordan Corngold (music editor)
2002	The Pianist	Suzana Peric (music editor)
2003	A Mighty Wind	Fernand Bos (music editor)
2003	The Company	Annette Kudrak (supervising music editor); Carl Sealove (music/scoring editor)
2003	The Fighting Temptations	Michael T. Ryan (music editor)
2003	School of Rock	Nic Ratner (music editor)
2004	Ray	Curt Sobel (music editor)
2004	Beyond the Sea	Andrew Glen (music editor)
2004	De-Lovely	Christopher Kennedy (music editor)
2004	The Phantom of the Opera	Yann McCullough (music editor)
2004	Raise Your Voice	Jeff Lingle, Michael T. Ryan (music editors)
2004	Shall We Dance?	Paul Rabjohns (supervising music editor); Allan Jenkins, Kirsty Whalley (music editors)
2005	Walk the Line	Mark Jan Wlodarkiewicz (supervising music editor); Terry Delsing (music editor); Bunny Andrews, Frank Wolf (scoring editors)
2005	The Chorus	
2005	Hustle & Flow	Marvin R. Morris, Shie Rozow (music editors)
2005	The Producers	Dan Lieberstein (supervising music editor); Missy Cohen, John M. Davis (music editors); Frank Wolf (vocal editor)
2005	Rent	Lisa Jaime (supervising music editor); Sally Boldt, Curtis Roush, Erich Stratmann (music editors)
2006	Dreamgirls	Paul Rabjohns (supervising music editor); Timothy Boot, Amanda Goodpaster, Jason Ruder (music editors)
2006	Copying Beethoven	Andrew Glen (music editor)
2006	A Prairie Home Companion	Annette Kudrak (supervising music editor)
2006	Take the Lead	Angie Rubin (supervising music editor); Jeffrey Potokar (music editor)
2006	Tenacious D in The Pick of Destiny	Michael Baber (music editor)
2007	Hairspray	Sally Boldt, Lisa Jaime, Will Kaplan (music editors)
2007	Enchanted	Kenneth Karman (supervising music editor); Jeremy Raub (music editor), Joanie Diener (production music editor)
2007	Sweeney Todd: The Demon Barber of Fleet Street	Michael Higham (supervising music editor); Sam Southwick, John Warhurst (music editors)
2007	Walk Hard: The Dewey Cox Story	Fernand Bos, Tom Kramer (music editors)

Best Sound Editing – Music in a Musical Feature Film

Year	Film	Winners/Nominees
2008	Mamma Mia!	Tony Lewis (supervising music editor); Robert Houston (music editor); Martin Lowe (musical director)
2008	High School Musical 3: Senior Year	Charles Martin Inouye (supervising music editor); Tanya Noel Hill (music editor)
2008	How She Move	Kevin Banks (supervising music editor); Yuri Gorbachow, Kenn Michael (music editors)
2008	Shine a Light	Tass Filipos (music editor)
2009	This Is It	Michael Durham Prince, Ryan Rubin, Scott Stambler (supervising music editors)
2009	Crazy Heart	Fernand Bos (supervising music editor); Adrian Van Velsen (music editor)
2009	Every Little Step	Joanie Diener (supervising music editor)
2009	Nine	Curt Sobel (supervising music editor); Christopher Benstead (music editor)

=== 2010s ===
Year	Film	Winners/Nominees
2010	Country Strong	Fernand Bos (supervising music editor); Philip Tallman (music editor)
2010	Burlesque	Todd Bozung (supervising music editor)
2010	Step Up 3D	Melissa Muik (supervising music editor)
2010	Tangled	Tom MacDougall (supervising music editor)
2011	The Muppets	Lisa Jaime (supervising music editor); Richard Ford (music editor)
2011	Footloose	Kevin McKeever (supervising music editor)
2011	The Perfect Age of Rock 'n' Roll	Dan Evans Farkas (supervising music editor)
2011	Pina	Matthias Lempert (supervising music editor)
2012	Les Misérables	Gerard McCann (supervising music editor); John Warhurst (co-supervising/vocals editor); Tim Hands, Alastair Sirkett (vocals editors); James Bellamy, Robert Houston, Rael Jones (music editors)
2012	Joyful Noise	Curt Sobel (supervising music editor)
2012	Pitch Perfect	Matt Fausak, Angie Rubin (music editors); Oliver Hug (additional music editor)
2012	Rock of Ages	Sally Boldt, Lisa Jaime (music editors)
2013	Frozen	Fernand Bos, Earl Ghaffari (music editors)
2013	Inside Llewyn Davis	Todd Kasow, Jen Monnar (music editors)
2013	Justin Bieber's Believe	Kevin McKeever (supervising music editor)
2013	Metallica: Through the Never	Matt Fausak, Ryan Rubin (music editors); Joseph Magee (supervising music mixer); Rick Kline (re-recording mixer)
2014	Get on Up	Curt Sobel (supervising music editor); Bill Bernstein, Jordan Corngold, Richard Henderson, Stephanie Lowry (music editors)
2014	Annie	Jon Wakeham (supervising sound editor/sound designer); Lisa Jaime, Sherry Whitfield (music editors)
2014	Into the Woods	Michael Higham (supervising music editor), Jennifer L. Dunnington (music editor)
2014	Jersey Boys	Chris McGeary (supervising music editor); Angela Claverie, Tommy Lockett (music editors)
2014	Whiplash	Richard Henderson, Ben Wilkins (supervising sound editors/sound designers); Craig Mann (music editor)
2015	Love & Mercy	Nicholas Renbeck (music editor)
2015	Pitch Perfect 2	Amanda Goodpaster (supervising music editor); Brett Pierce (music editor)
2015	Straight Outta Compton	Bryan Lawson, Jason Ruder (music editors)
2016	La La Land	Jason Ruder (music editor)
2016	Florence Foster Jenkins	Gerard McCann (supervising music editor); Stuart Morton, Neil Stemp (music editors)
2016	Moana	Earl Ghaffari, Daniel Pinder (music editors)
2016	Sing Street	Becky Bentham (supervising music editor); Kieran Lynch (music editor)
2016	Trolls	Fernand Bos, Vicki Hiatt, Erich Stratmann (music editors)

Outstanding Achievement in Sound Editing – Musical for Feature Film

Year	Film	Winners/Nominees
2017	The Greatest Showman	Jen Monnar (supervising music editor); Ted Caplan, Jeff Carson, Jim Harrison, Peter Myles, Sheri Ozeki (music editors)
2017	Beauty and the Beast	Christopher Benstead (supervising music editor); Christopher Brooks, Robin Morrison (music editors); Robin Baynton (scoring editor)
2017	Coco	Stephen M. Davis (supervising music editor), Warren Brown (music editor)
2018	Bohemian Rhapsody	John Warhurst (supervising music editor); Neil Stemp (music editor)
2018	Mary Poppins Returns	Jennifer L. Dunnington (supervising music editor); Jim Bruening, Lewis Morison (music editors); Fiona Cruickshank (scoring editor)
2018	A Star Is Born	Jason Ruder (supervising music editor); Lena Glikson (music editor)
2019	Rocketman	Andy Patterson, Cecile Tournesac (music editors)
2019	Cats	Nina Hartstone, John Warhurst (supervising music editors); Victor Chaga, James Shirley, Cecile Tournesac (music editors)
2019	Echo in the Canyon	Robert Stambler (music editor)
2019	Frozen 2	Earl Ghaffari (supervising music editor); Fernand Bos, Kendall Demarest (music editors)
2019	Judy	Paul John Chandler (music editor)
2019	Rolling Thunder Revue: A Bob Dylan Story by Martin Scorsese	John M. Davis (music editor)
2019	Western Stars	Brandon Duncan (music editor)

=== 2020s ===
Year	Film	Winners/Nominees
2020	Eurovision Song Contest: The Story of Fire Saga	Allegra De Souza, Jon Mooney, Peter Oso Snell (music editors)
2020	The 40-Year-Old Version	Lightchild (music editor)
2020	The High Note	Louis Schultz (music editor)
2020	I Am Woman	Stuart Morton (supervising music editor); Bry Jones, Michael Tan (music editors)
2020	Ma Rainey's Black Bottom	Todd Kasow (supervising music editor); Tim Marchiafava (music editor)
2020	The Prom	Nick Baxter, David Klotz (music editors)
