= 30th Daytime Emmy Awards =

- Date: May 16, 2003 (Ceremony); May 10, 2003 (Creative Arts Awards)
- Location: Radio City Music Hall, New York City
- Presented by: National Academy of Television Arts and Sciences
- Hosted by: Wayne Brady

Highlights
- Outstanding Drama Series: As the World Turns
- Outstanding Game Show: Jeopardy!

Television/radio coverage
- Network: ABC

The 30th Daytime Emmy Awards ceremony, commemorating excellence in American daytime programming from 2002, was held on May 16, 2003 at Radio City Music Hall in New York City. Hosted by Wayne Brady, it was televised in the United States by ABC.

Creative Arts Emmy Awards were presented on May 10, 2003.

== Nominations and winners ==
The following is a partial list of nominees, with winners in bold:

=== Outstanding Drama Series ===
- **As the World Turns**
- The Bold and the Beautiful
- Port Charles
- The Young and the Restless

=== Outstanding Lead Actor in a Drama Series ===
- Grant Aleksander (Phillip Spaulding, Guiding Light)
- **Maurice Benard (Sonny Corinthos, General Hospital)**
- Doug Davidson (Paul Williams, The Young and the Restless)
- Anthony Geary (Luke Spencer, General Hospital)
- Ricky Paull Goldin (Gus Aitoro, Guiding Light)
- Thorsten Kaye (Ian Thornhart, Port Charles)

=== Outstanding Lead Actress in a Drama Series ===
- Eileen Davidson (Ashley Abbott Carlton, The Young and the Restless)
- **Susan Flannery (Stephanie Forrester, The Bold and the Beautiful)**
- Nancy Lee Grahn (Alexis Davis, General Hospital)
- Michelle Stafford (Phyllis Summers Abbott, The Young and the Restless)
- Kim Zimmer (Reva Shayne Lewis, Guiding Light)

=== Outstanding Supporting Actor in a Drama Series ===
- Josh Duhamel (Leo du Pres, All My Children)
- **Benjamin Hendrickson (Hal Munson, As the World Turns)**
- Christian LeBlanc (Michael Baldwin, The Young and the Restless)
- Ron Raines (Alan Spaulding, Guiding Light)
- Paul Anthony Stewart (Danny Santos, Guiding Light)

=== Outstanding Supporting Actress in a Drama Series ===
- Rebecca Budig (Greenlee Smythe, All My Children)
- Robin Christopher (Skye Chandler, General Hospital)
- Linda Dano (Rae Cummings, One Life to Live)
- **Vanessa Marcil (Brenda Barrett, General Hospital)**
- Cady McClain (Rosanna Cabot Montgomery, As the World Turns)
- Kelly Monaco (Livvie Locke/Tess Ramsey, Port Charles)

=== Outstanding Younger Actor in a Drama Series ===
- Chad Brannon (Zander Smith, General Hospital)
- David Lago (Raul Guittierez, The Young and the Restless)
- Kyle Lowder (Brady Black, Days of Our Lives)
- Aiden Turner (Aidan Devane, All My Children)
- **Jordi Vilasuso (Tony Santos, Guiding Light)**

=== Outstanding Younger Actress in a Drama Series ===
- **Jennifer Finnigan (Bridget Forrester, The Bold and the Beautiful)**
- Adrienne Frantz (Amber Moore, The Bold and the Beautiful)
- Lindsey McKeon (Marah Lewis, Guiding Light)
- Erin Hershey Presley (Alison Barrington, Port Charles)
- Alicia Leigh Willis (Courtney Matthews, General Hospital)

=== Outstanding Drama Series Writing Team ===
- All My Children
- As the World Turns
- The Bold and the Beautiful
- **General Hospital**
- Guiding Light
- Passions
- The Young and the Restless

=== Outstanding Drama Series Directing Team ===
- **All My Children**
- As the World Turns
- Days of Our Lives
- Passions

=== Outstanding Game/Audience Participation Show ===
- Hollywood Squares
- **Jeopardy!**
- The Price Is Right
- Wheel of Fortune
- Win Ben Stein's Money

=== Outstanding Game Show Host ===
- Tom Bergeron, Hollywood Squares
- Bob Barker, The Price is Right
- Donny Osmond, Pyramid
- Pat Sajak, Wheel of Fortune
- Ben Stein and Sal Iacono, Win Ben Stein's Money
- **Alex Trebek, Jeopardy!**

=== Outstanding Talk Show ===
Two winners were recorded in the Outstanding Talk Show category, as a tie was recorded in the race between The View and The Wayne Brady Show.

- Dr. Phil
- Live With Regis and Kelly
- Soap Talk
- **The View**
- **The Wayne Brady Show**

=== Outstanding Talk Show Host ===
- **Wayne Brady, The Wayne Brady Show**
- Phil McGraw, Dr. Phil
- Regis Philbin and Kelly Ripa, Live With Regis and Kelly
- Lisa Rinna and Ty Treadway, Soap Talk
- Barbara Walters, Meredith Vieira, Star Jones, Joy Behar and Lisa Ling, The View

=== Outstanding Service Show ===
- Ask This Old House
- The Christopher Lowell Show
- Essence of Emeril
- **Martha Stewart Living**
- This Old House

=== Outstanding Service Show Host ===
- Emeril Lagasse, Essence of Emeril
- Christopher Lowell, The Christopher Lowell Show
- **Martha Stewart, Martha Stewart Living**
- Steve Thomas, This Old House

=== Outstanding Special Class Series ===
- **A Baby Story**
- Breakfast With The Arts
- Judge Judy
- Pop-up Video
- While You Were Out

=== Outstanding Children's Animated Program ===
- Arthur
- Clifford the Big Red Dog
- Dora the Explorer
- Dragon Tales
- **Rugrats**

=== Outstanding Sound Editing - Live Action and Animation ===
- **Robert Hargreaves, George Brooks and Giovanni Moscardino (X-Men: Evolution)**
- Rick Hinson, Gary Falcone, Joe Pizzulo, Elizabeth Hinso, Devon Bowman, Mark Mercado, Jeremy Pitts, Sanaa Cannella, Gregory Cathcart and Josh Mancell (Clifford the Big Red Dog)
- Otis Van Osten, Jason Oliver, Rick Hammel and David Lynch (Fillmore!)
- Mark Keatts, Kelly Ann Foley, Kerry Iverson, Mark Keefer, Jason Freedman, Cecil Broughton and Joe Sandusky (Ozzy & Drix)
- Rick Livingstone and Dave Novak (Prehistoric Planet)

=== Outstanding Sound Mixing - Live Action and Animation ===
- **Marie-Pierre Lacombe, Benoît Coaillier and Stéphane Bergeron (Arthur)**
- Patrick Sellars and Neal Anderson (Barney & Friends)
- Devon Bowman, Dan Cubert, Jeremy Pitts and Gregory Cathcart (Clifford the Big Red Dog)
- Juan Aceves (Dora the Explorer)
- Blake Norton, Dick Maitland and Bob Schott (Sesame Street)

=== Outstanding Special Class Animated Program ===
- Static Shock
- Madeline: My Fair Madeline
- Ozzy & Drix
- Rolie Polie Olie
- **Teacher's Pet**

=== Outstanding Performer In An Animated Program ===
- Mindy Cohn (Velma Dinkley, What's New, Scooby-Doo?)
- Walter Cronkite (Benjamin Franklin, Liberty's Kids)
- Ruby Dee (Alice the Great, Little Bill)
- **Gregory Hines, (Big Bill, Little Bill)**
- John Ritter (Clifford, Clifford the Big Red Dog)

=== Outstanding Pre-School Children's Series ===
- Bear in the Big Blue House
- Blue's Clues
- **Sesame Street**

=== Outstanding Children's Series ===
- Assignment Discovery
- Between the Lions
- Even Stevens
- **Reading Rainbow**
- ZOOM

=== Outstanding Directing in a Children's Series ===
- **Mitchell Kriegman and Dean Gordon (Bear in the Big Blue House)**
- Lisa Simon, Emily Squires, Richard A. Fernandes and Bill Berner (Between the Lions)
- Bruce Caines, Alan Zdinak, Koyalee Chanda and Dave Palmer (Blue's Clues)
- Ed Wiseman (Reading Rainbow)
- Ted May, Emily Squires, Victor DiNapoli, Ken Diego, Lisa Simon and Jim Martin (Sesame Street)

=== Outstanding Performer in a Children's Series ===
- LeVar Burton (Himself, Reading Rainbow)
- Kevin Clash (Elmo, Sesame Street)
- **Shia LaBeouf (Louis Stevens, Even Stevens)**
- Noel MacNeal (Bear, Bear in the Big Blue House)
- Donna Pescow (Eileen Stevens, Even Stevens)

=== Outstanding Performer in a Children's Special ===
- Tom Cavanagh (Val Duncan, Bang Bang You're Dead)
- **Ben Foster (Trevor Adams, Bang Bang You're Dead)**
- Gregory Hines (Zeke, The Red Sneakers )
- Bernadette Peters (Bailey Lewis, Bobbie's Girl)
- Vanessa L. Williams (Sandra Williams, Our America)

=== Outstanding Children's Special ===
- **William Mastrosimone, Norman Stephens, Paul Hellerman and Deboragh Gabler (Bang Bang You're Dead)**
- Joseph Stern, Angela Bassett, Eda Godel Hallinan and Armand Leo (Our America)
- Jane Paley and Larry Price (Table Talk: Talking Beyond 9/11)
- Kate Taylor, Jim Johnston, Kathleen Shugrue, Paul Serafini, Marcy Gunther and Kathy Waugh (Zoom: America's Kids Remember)

=== Outstanding Directing in a Children's Special ===
- **Guy Ferland (Bang Bang You're Dead)**
- Danny Glover (Just a Dream)
- Gregory Hines (The Red Sneakers)

=== Outstanding Writing in a Children's Special ===
- **William Mastrosimone (Bang Bang You're Dead)**
- Gordon Rayfield (Our America)

=== Outstanding Single Camera Photography (Film or Electronic) ===
- **Ernest R. Dickerson (Our America)**
- Garry Nardilla, Stephen Murello and Frankie DeJoseph (Martha Stewart Living)
- Joel Shapiro Ari Haberberg and Jimmy O'Donnell (Reading Rainbow)
- Stephen J. D'Onofrio (Ask This Old House)

=== Lifetime Achievement Award ===
- **Art Linkletter**
