= De-Lovely =

2004 film by Irwin Winkler

- Theatrical release poster
- Directed by: Irwin Winkler
- Written by: Jay Cocks
- Based on: Life of Cole Porter
- Produced by: Irwin Winkler; Charles Winkler; Rob Cowan
- Starring: Kevin Kline; Ashley Judd; Jonathan Pryce; Kevin McNally; Sandra Nelson; Allan Corduner; Peter Polycarpou
- Cinematography: Tony Pierce-Roberts
- Edited by: Julie Monroe
- Music by: Cole Porter
- Production companies: Metro-Goldwyn-Mayer; United Artists; Winkler Films
- Distributed by: MGM Distribution Co. (United States); 20th Century Fox (International)
- Release date: July 2, 2004
- Running time: 125 minutes
- Country: United States
- Language: English
- Budget: $15 million
- Box office: $18.4 million

De-Lovely is a 2004 American musical biopic directed by Irwin Winkler and released by Metro-Goldwyn-Mayer. The screenplay by Jay Cocks is based on the life and career of Cole Porter, from his first meeting with his wife, Linda Lee Thomas, until his death. It is the second biopic about the composer, following 1946's Night and Day.

== Plot ==
As he is about to die, Porter's life flashes before him in the form of a musical production staged by the archangel Gabriel in the Indiana theater where the composer first performed on stage.

He recalls the night he met his wife, Linda Lee Thomas, a recent divorcee and stunning beauty. From the start, they click and become a devoted couple. Linda is well aware that Cole is gay. Her first husband was abusive to her, but, as she confesses to him on their wedding day, Cole is completely different. Because he loves her and is publicly affectionate, Linda tolerates his extramarital dalliances. During their marriage, Cole's career flourishes. Linda begins the tradition of presenting Cole with a custom designed and engraved Cartier cigarette case at the opening of each new show.

To cheer Linda after she experiences a miscarriage, the couple move to Hollywood. After an initial period of excitement, Cole's flings become too overt and indiscreet and they create tension. Cole is photographed in an amorous embrace with another man in the restroom of a gay nightclub. Both he and Linda are blackmailed into paying a large sum to suppress publication of the pictures. When he shrugs off the blackmail, she goes to Paris, leaving him bereft.

It is not until Cole is seriously injured in a horse riding accident that Linda returns to his side, willing to forgive, but still finding difficulty in coping with his extramarital affairs. She is eventually diagnosed with emphysema, and in an attempt to provide Cole with a new partner once she is gone, she introduces him to her decorator and estate advisor. The match is successful.

When Linda dies in 1954, Cole is devastated. He continues working until 1958 when degeneration of his right leg finally requires amputation, affecting his creative output. He never writes again, but does participate in productions of his earlier works. Cole dies in 1964 at age 73.

== Cast ==
- Kevin Kline as Cole Porter
- Ashley Judd as Linda Lee Thomas/Porter
- Jonathan Pryce as Gabriel the archangel
- Kevin McNally as Gerald Murphy
- Sandra Nelson as Sara Murphy
- Allan Corduner as Monty Woolley
- Peter Polycarpou as Louis B. Mayer
- Keith Allen as Irving Berlin
- James Wilby as Edward Thomas
- Kevin McKidd as Bobby Reed
- Richard Dillane as Bill Wrather
- John Barrowman as Jack
- Peter Jessop as Diaghilev
- Edward Baker-Duly as Boris Kochno
- Jeff Harding as Cody
- Caroline O'Connor as Ethel Merman
- Lara Fabian as Patricia Morison

See "Soundtrack" section for the numerous pop and rock musicians who appeared as on-screen "musical performers".

== Production ==
Although Porter was a passable singer at best, director Irwin Winkler cast Kevin Kline, winner of two Tony Awards and two Drama Desk Awards for his musical performances on Broadway, as the composer. He stayed in character by limiting his vocal range. Most of his singing was recorded live on the set, and the actor played the piano himself in the scenes where Porter plays.

According to Winkler's commentary on the DVD release of the film, he had considered numerous actresses for the role of Linda when Ashley Judd's agent advised him she was interested in the part. Winkler was certain her salary demand would exceed that allowed by the budget, but the actress was so anxious to portray Linda she was willing to lower her usual asking price. Judd is twenty years younger than Kline, although the composer's wife was eight years older than he.

Filming locations included Chiswick House and Luton Hoo.

The film premiered at the 2004 Cannes Film Festival. It was shown at the CineVegas International Film Festival, the Sydney Film Festival, and the San Francisco International Lesbian and Gay Film Festival before going into limited release in the US.

== Reception ==
The film grossed $13,337,299 in the US and $5,059,083 in other markets for a total worldwide box office of $18,396,382.

Critically, the film had a mixed reception. On the review aggregator website Rotten Tomatoes, 48% of 154 critics' reviews are positive, with an average rating of 5.7/10. The website's consensus reads: "Musical numbers save movie from cliches." Metacritic, which uses a weighted average, assigned the film a score of 53 out of 100, based on 33 critics, indicating "mixed or average" reviews.

Roger Ebert gave the film 3.5 out of a possible four stars. He wrote, for his review in the Chicago Sun-Times, that De-Lovely "...brings [...] a worldly sophistication that is rare in the movies".

Larry King said: "Far and away the best musical biography ever made."

In his review in The New York Times, Stephen Holden called the film "lethally inert" and "lifeless and drained of genuine joie de vivre" and added, "It didn't have to be like this. In their highly stylized ways, All That Jazz (Bob Fosse's morbidly manic screen autobiography), Ken Russell's surreal portraits of composers or any of Federico Fellini's libidinous self-explorations have delved deeply into the muck of artistic creativity. Sadly, the daring and imagination required to go below the surface are nowhere to be found in De-Lovely."

Ruthe Stein of the San Francisco Chronicle said, "The movie never gels – despite Kline's nuanced performance, the stars' exquisite period clothes designed by Armani, and, of course, Porter's great songs. Director Irwin Winkler's highly stylized technique is difficult to connect with emotionally. His film also suffers from shockingly sloppy editing for a studio production. If nothing else, the composer . . . deserves a movie that has rhythm. But De- Lovely lurches along like a car with a missing spark plug."

In Rolling Stone, Peter Travers rated the film three out of a possible four stars and commented, "In voice, manner, patrician charm and private torment, Kevin Kline is perfection as legendary composer Cole Porter . . . At its best, De-Lovely evokes a time, a place and a sound with stylish wit and sophistication."

Steve Persall of the St. Petersburg Times graded the film C− and observed, "The movie is actually an ugly compilation of clashing cinematic styles occasionally salvaged by musical numbers that essentially are part of the problem. You can't make a good movie about a 1930s composer using a 1970s film conceit while hiring 21st century recording artists to perform Porter's classic songs. A tribute CD, maybe, but not a movie . . . [it] plays like a cabaret review rather than a motion picture, a sublime collection of songs linked by scripted banter barely scratching the surface of its subject. Not delightful, not delicious, just disappointing."

Billboard reported that the film "has inspired a Cole Porter renaissance on Top Jazz albums". By the end of July 2004, the film's soundtrack reached 4–3 on Top Soundtracks and 77–58 on The Billboard 200. The film also boosted chart numbers for the then-recently released compilations albums: The Very Best of Cole Porter, Ultra Lounge: Cocktails With Cole Porter, and It's De Lovely - The Authentic Cole Porter Collection.

== Awards and nominations ==
Award	Category	Nominee(s)	Result
AARP Movies for Grownups Awards	Best Movie Time Capsule	Eve Stewart	Won
American Cinema Editors Awards	Best Edited Feature Film – Comedy or Musical	Julie Monroe	Nominated
Costume Designers Guild Awards	Excellence in Period/Fantasy Film	Janty Yates	Nominated
Critics' Choice Movie Awards	Best Soundtrack		Nominated
Golden Globe Awards	Best Actor in a Motion Picture – Musical or Comedy	Kevin Kline	Nominated
Golden Globe Awards	Best Actress in a Motion Picture – Musical or Comedy	Ashley Judd	Nominated
Golden Reel Awards	Best Sound Editing – Music – Musical Feature Film	Christopher Kennedy	Nominated
Grammy Awards	Best Compilation Soundtrack Album for a Motion Picture, Television or Other Visual Media	Peter Asher and Stephen Endelman	Nominated
Online Film & Television Association Awards	Best Adapted Song	"Begin the Beguine"; Music and Lyrics by Cole Porter; Performed by Sheryl Crow	Nominated
Online Film & Television Association Awards	Best Adapted Song	"Let's Do It (Let's Fall in Love)"; Music and Lyrics by Cole Porter; Performed by Alanis Morissette	Nominated
Prism Awards	Wide Release Feature Film		Nominated
Prism Awards	Performance in a Feature Film	Ashley Judd	Nominated
Satellite Awards	Best Actor in a Motion Picture – Musical or Comedy	Kevin Kline	Nominated
Satellite Awards	Best Art Direction and Production Design	Eve Stewart, John Bush and John Hill	Won
Satellite Awards	Best Costume Design	Janty Yates	Nominated

== Soundtrack ==
A soundtrack album of music from the film was released on June 15, 2004.

Track listing (Europe)

1. "It's De-Lovely" performed by Robbie Williams
2. "Let's Do It, Let's Fall in Love" performed by Alanis Morissette
3. "Begin the Beguine" performed by Sheryl Crow
4. "Let's Misbehave" performed by Elvis Costello
5. "Be a Clown" performed by Kevin Kline, Peter Polycarpou, and Chorus
6. "Night and Day" performed by John Barrowman
7. "Easy to Love" performed by Kevin Kline (American release omits this track)
8. "True Love" by Ashley Judd and Tayler Hamilton
9. "What is This Thing Called Love?" performed by Lemar
10. "I Love You" performed by Mick Hucknall
11. "Just One of Those Things" performed by Diana Krall
12. "Anything Goes" performed by Caroline O'Connor
13. "Experiment" performed by Kevin Kline
14. "Love for Sale" performed by Vivian Green
15. "So in Love" performed by Lara Fabian and Mario Frangoulis
16. "Ev'ry Time We Say Goodbye" performed by Natalie Cole
17. "Blow, Gabriel, Blow" performed by Jonathan Pryce, Kevin Kline, Cast, and Chorus
18. "In the Still of the Night" performed by Kevin Kline and Ashley Judd
19. "You're the Top" performed by Cole Porter

== See also ==
- List of American films of 2004
- List of lesbian, gay, bisexual, or transgender-related films by storyline
