= Margo Winkler =

American actress

Margo Winkler (née Melson) is an American actress.

== Career ==
Winkler often played minor roles as receptionists, clerks or judges. She is known for her minor roles in several of Martin Scorsese's films which her husband Irwin Winkler produced. She is best known for her roles in Goodfellas (1990) as Belle Kessler and as the receptionist in The King of Comedy (1983) whom Robert De Niro's character approaches on numerous occasions. She is also known for her role as Barbara in Life as a House (2001). She made her screen debut in 1970 in Stuart Hagmann's The Strawberry Statement. In 1999 she appeared in her son Charles Winkler's picture Rocky Marciano, and her last appearance was in 2006 in her husband Irwin Winkler's Home of the Brave as a waiting room mother.
