= Julie Monroe =

American film editor

- Occupation: Film editor
- Years active: 1986–present

Julie Monroe is an American film editor best known (along with fellow film editors Joe Hutshing, Pietro Scalia and David Brenner) for having been one of director Oliver Stone's 'hot shot' group of up-and-coming film editors.

Julie Monroe's credits include JFK (as Associate Editor), De-Lovely, Gigli, Hanging Up, Life as a House, and The Patriot.

== Filmography ==
Editor
Year	Film	Director	Notes
1997	Lolita	Adrian Lyne	Second collaboration with Adrian Lyne
1999	At First Sight	Irwin Winkler	First collaboration with Irwin Winkler
2000	Hanging Up	Diane Keaton	
2000	The Patriot	Roland Emmerich	
2001	Life as a House	Irwin Winkler	Second collaboration with Irwin Winkler
2003	Gigli	Martin Brest	
2004	De-Lovely	Irwin Winkler	Third collaboration with Irwin Winkler
2005	The Big White	Mark Mylod	First collaboration with Mark Mylod
2006	World Trade Center	Oliver Stone	Seventh collaboration with Oliver Stone
2008	W.	Oliver Stone	Eighth collaboration with Oliver Stone
2009	The Marc Pease Experience	Todd Louiso	
2010	Wall Street: Money Never Sleeps	Oliver Stone	Ninth collaboration with Oliver Stone
2011	What's Your Number?	Mark Mylod	Second collaboration with Mark Mylod
2012	Mud	Jeff Nichols	First collaboration with Jeff Nichols
2014	Lullaby	Andrew Levitas	
2015	Danny Collins	Dan Fogelman	First collaboration with Dan Fogelman
2016	Midnight Special	Jeff Nichols	Second collaboration with Jeff Nichols
2016	Loving	Jeff Nichols	Third collaboration with Jeff Nichols
2018	Burden	Andrew Heckler	
2018	Life Itself	Dan Fogelman	Second collaboration with Dan Fogelman
2019	Wine Country	Amy Poehler	First collaboration with Amy Poehler
2019	Lady and the Tramp	Charlie Bean	
2021	Moxie	Amy Poehler	Second collaboration with Amy Poehler
2023	Manodrome	John Trengove	
2023	The Bikeriders	Jeff Nichols	Fourth collaboration with Jeff Nichols
2025	Satisfaction	Alex Burunova	
2025	She Rides Shotgun	Nick Rowland	
2025	The Hand That Rocks the Cradle	Michelle Garza Cervera	

Editorial department
Year	Film	Director	Role	Notes
1986	Salvador	Oliver Stone	Assistant editor	First collaboration with Oliver Stone
1986	Platoon	Oliver Stone	Assistant editor	Second collaboration with Oliver Stone
1987	Wall Street	Oliver Stone	Assistant editor	Third collaboration with Oliver Stone
1988	A Time of Destiny	Gregory Nava	Second assistant editor	
1989	How I Got into College	Savage Steve Holland	Assistant editor	
1989	Born on the Fourth of July	Oliver Stone	First assistant film editor	Fourth collaboration with Oliver Stone
1991	The Doors	Oliver Stone	First assistant editor	Fifth collaboration with Oliver Stone
1991	JFK	Oliver Stone	Associate editor	Sixth collaboration with Oliver Stone
1993	Indecent Proposal	Adrian Lyne	Additional film editor	First collaboration with Adrian Lyne
1994	The River Wild	Curtis Hanson	Assistant editor	
1996	Fear	James Foley	First assistant editor	
2007	Fred Claus	David Dobkin	Additional editor: Chicago Unit	
2008	Righteous Kill	Jon Avnet	Additional editor	
2017	Transformers: The Last Knight	Michael Bay	Additional editing by	

Thanks
Year	Film	Director	Role
2004	House of 9	Steven R. Monroe	The director wishes to thank
2005	It Waits	Steven R. Monroe	Special thanks
2006	Sasquatch Mountain	Steven R. Monroe	Thanks
2012	Complacent	Steven R. Monroe	The director wishes to thank

Documentaries

Editorial department
Year	Film	Director	Role
2012	No Place on Earth	Janet Tobias	Additional editor

TV series

Editor
Year	Title	Notes
2011	Shameless	2 episodes
2011	Once Upon a Time	1 episode
2015	Minority Report	1 episode
2015	The Man in the High Castle	2 episodes
2021	Only Murders in the Building	3 episodes
2023	Daisy Jones & the Six	2 episodes

Editorial department
Year	Title	Role	Notes
2021	Only Murders in the Building	Editor	1 episode

== Awards and nominations ==
- 2005 – De-Lovely - nominated for American Cinema Editors (ACE) Eddie (Best Edited Feature Film)
