= Mark Andrus =

American screenwriter (born 1955)

- Born: December 13, 1955 (age 70); Los Angeles, California, U.S.
- Education: University of California, Riverside (MBA); University of Southern California (Master of Professional Writing)
- Occupation: Screenwriter
- Years active: 1991–present
- Notable work: As Good as It Gets; Life as a House; Georgia Rule; Divine Secrets of the Ya-Ya Sisterhood
- Awards: Writers Guild of America Award for Best Original Screenplay; Southeastern Film Critics Association Award for Best Original Screenplay; PRISM Award for Best Feature Film

Mark Andrus (born December 13, 1955) is an American screenwriter.

After receiving a Master of Business Administration from UC Riverside, Andrus decided to take a creative writing class while waiting to hear from the law schools to which he had applied. Impressed by his work, instructor Tomás Rivera encouraged him to enroll in the Master of Professional Writing Program at the University of Southern California. Andrus later joined Castle Rock Entertainment, where he received his first screen credit for the 1991 romantic fantasy Late for Dinner.

Shortly after, Andrus wrote Old Friends, a screenplay about the vilest man in New York City and his gay neighbor. Initially Kevin Kline, Ralph Fiennes, Holly Hunter, and producer Laura Ziskin expressed interest, but after many meetings the project fell into limbo for three years until James L. Brooks became involved. The two collaborated on a rewrite that became As Good as It Gets, which won the duo the Writers Guild of America Award for Best Original Screenplay and the Southeastern Film Critics Association Award for Best Original Screenplay. The two also shared nominations for the Academy Award for Best Original Screenplay and the Golden Globe Award for Best Screenplay.

Andrus also wrote the original scripts Life as a House and Georgia Rule, which won him and director Garry Marshall the Entertainment Industries Council PRISM Award for Best Feature Film, and the adaptation of Divine Secrets of the Ya-Ya Sisterhood.

Andrus lives in San Juan Capistrano, California.

== Filmography ==
- Late for Dinner (1991)
- As Good as it Gets (1997)
- Life as a House (2001)
- Divine Secrets of the Ya-Ya Sisterhood (adaptation) (2002)
- Georgia Rule (2007)
- And So It Goes (2014)
- Otherhood (2019)
