= Oscar Marone =

- The Bold and the Beautiful character
- Portrayed by: Brian Gaskill
- Duration: 2003–04
- First appearance: September 11, 2003
- Last appearance: August 16, 2004
- Created by: Bradley Bell
- Introduced by: Bradley Bell
In-universe information
- Other names: Oz; Ozzy
- Occupation: Businessman; Club owner Casino owner
- Grandparents: Massimo Marone ll
- Uncles: Massimo Marone
- First cousins: Ridge Forrester; Nick Marone; Diana Carter
- Other relatives: Thomas Forrester; Phoebe Forrester; Steffy Forrester; R.J. Forrester; Jack Marone

Oscar Marone is a fictional character from the American soap opera The Bold and the Beautiful, played by Brian Gaskill. Gaskill joined the soap after another soap opera, Port Charles, was cancelled. Created by The Bold and the Beautiful executive producer Bradley Bell, Oscar was introduced as the nephew of established character Massimo Marone (Joseph Mascolo) and he was described as being the black sheep of the family. Oscar's initial storyline sees him almost be killed by people involved in his dodgy business from Las Vegas. Oscar later opens up his own club, which leads to the supposed death of performer Macy Alexander (Bobbie Eakes) when people from Oscar's past sabotage the club's chandelier, which falls on Macey and puts her in a coma. Oscar later enters into a relationship and gets engaged to Bridget Forrester (Jennifer Finnigan/Emily Harrison/Ashley Jones). However, the relationship was disrupted by the recasting of the character. In June 2004, following reduced screentime for Oscar, it was announced that Gaskill had opted to go on recurring status as he felt that the character had not found his place on the soap. Despite being open to play the character again, Gaskill later said in a statement that he was unsure if he would be called to reprise the role.

== Casting and development ==
Oscar was played by Brian Gaskill, who had previously appeared in the soap operas All My Children and Port Charles and would later appear in three more; As the World Turns, Guiding Light and The Bold and the Beautiful's sister soap, The Young and the Restless. In 2003, when Gaskill found out that Port Charles had been cancelled, he received job offers of returning to his role of Bobby Warner on All My Children or to portray Oscar on The Bold and the Beautiful. Gaskill chose the latter as he did not want to move across the United States to New York City, where All My Children was filmed; this decision surprised some viewers of Daytime television. He signed on for one year at The Bold and the Beautiful; whilst it felt like the right decision at the time, Gaskill said in 2024 that he regrets not signing onto All My Children as he would have been felt he would have felt better connected to Bobby's character.

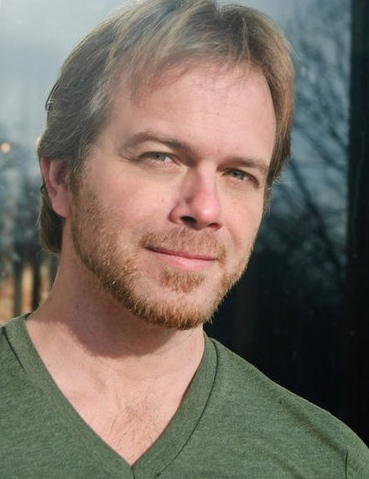
Brian Gaskill portrayed Seth Morgan from 2003 to 2004.

The role was created for Gaskill by The Bold and the Beautiful executive producer Bradley Bell. Oscar is introduced as the nephew of established character Massimo Marone (Joseph Mascolo) and the cousin of Ridge Forrester (Ronn Moss). Oscar was described as being the "black sheep" of the Marone family and being slightly "tougher around the edges" than the rest of the family. Gaskill opined that whilst Oscar is not necessarily a "bad guy", he is also "not all good"; he explained, "He might seem kind of cold sometimes, but I think his heart's in the right place. To be honest, I'm not 100 percent sure who he is until I've played him a while", adding that Bell "keeps things pretty close" and that "You never know where this guy might end up". Oscar was also referred to as "Oz" by his friends, and also referred to as "Ozzy". In one storyline, Oscar visits Massimo in prison and they create a plan to save Marone Industries, the family business.

Oscar is involved in the death of Macy Alexander (Bobbie Eakes), who gets a singing job at his new nightclub. Oscar had gotten involved with some criminal men who want to teach him a lesson, so they tamper the chandelier that is above Macy when she is singing "The Greatest Love of All" at Oscar's nightclub; Oscar and Thorne Forrester (Winsor Harmon) try to save Macy when they see the chandelier falling but they are too late, leading to Macy presumably dying. After the scenes involving Macy being crushed by chandelier aired, it was initially unknown when Macy would be killed off or if she would recover, although Eakes said that the character could be resurrected again even if she did die. Macy's mother, Sally Spectra (Darlene Conley), is initially upset when she finds out that Oscar plans to reopen the "Ozzz" nightclub again whilst Macy is still in a coma, but she, Clarke Garrison (Daniel McVicar) and Macy's husband Deacon Sharpe (Sean Kanan) are "touched" to learn that Oscar intends to using the opening of Ozzz to hold a candlelight tribute for Macy. Sally then learns that Oscar's plan is to close the club immediately and start the "Macy Alexander Coma Research Foundation".

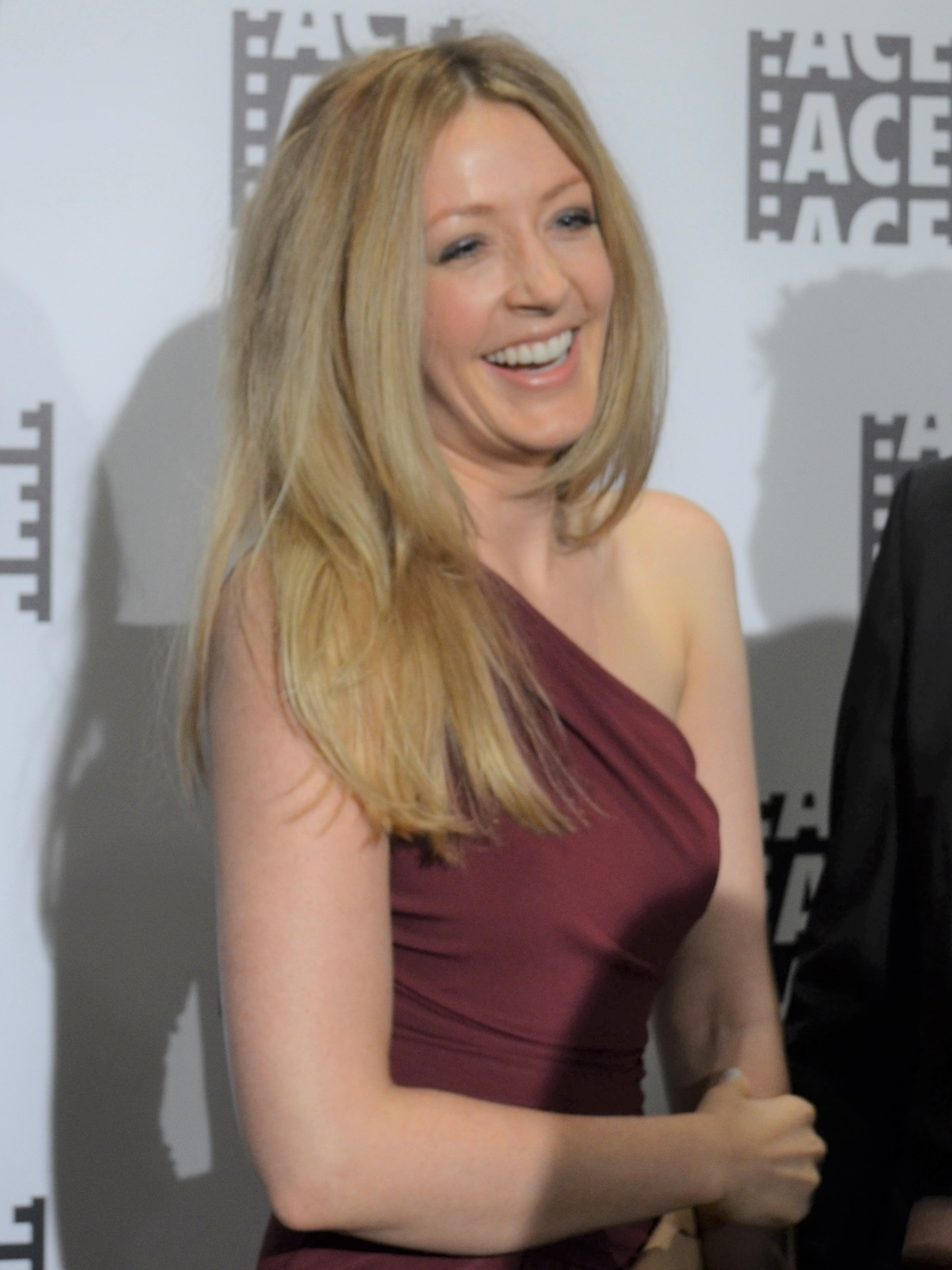
Jennifer Finnigan originally played Bridget when she begins a relationship with Oscar

Oscar starts a relationship with Bridget Forrester. Oscar initially was in a romantic storyline with Ridge, Oscar's cousin, but this was replaced with a relationship with Oscar instead. Whilst being with Bridget, Oscar becomes a "love rival" of Deacon, Bridget's former husband. Amber Moore (Adrienne Frantz) tries to get Deacon to break up Oscar and Bridget as she wants Oscar herself. In November 2003, Oscar is tempted to accept a job offer by Amber at Deacon's new fashion company; unbeknownst to Oscar, Amber has convinced Deacon into hiring Oscar so Amber can be with Oscar romantically, leaving Bridget free for Deacon to pursue. The following month, Oscar stuns Bridget when he pledges his love and proposes to her; Bridget accepts but says she wants a long engagement and is not ready to have sex yet, which Oscar accepts. Massimo approves of the engagement and promises that, when worthy of it, Oscar will get the Marone family ring. Whilst Oscar and Bridget are engaged, the role of Bridget was recast to Emily Harrison. Harrison was later moved to recurring status and Oscar and Bridget's relationship received less air time later on in 2004.

In June 2004, it was reported that Gaskill would be taken off contract the following month and thereafter appear as a recurring character. This followed a reduction in Gaskill's appearances as Oscar on the soap. Gaskill had asked to go on recurring status due to the lack of a big storyline for Oscar. Insiders attributed to Gaskill's reduction of screentime – which had began a few months after his first appearance – to the departure of Finnigan. Gaskill revealed in a statement that he had chosen to leave his contract and remain on a recurring basis, saying that Oscar had not yet found a place to "blossom" on the soap. However, Gaskill said that he and Bell had agreed and were happy that Oscar could still appear from time to time, and Gaskill thanked his fans and journalists who supported him and said he was looking forward to what other opportunities would come next in his life. At the time of the announcement, it had been reported that The Bold and the Beautiful had "stepped up their efforts" to lure Gaskill's former Port Charles co-star, Erin Hershey Presley, to join The Bold and the Beautiful. In October 2004, Gaskill said in a statement that he had not worked on the soap since his last appearance, and that he did not know if or when he would return to the role despite being on recurring status. In the soap, Bridget and Oscar subsequently leave Los Angeles together, engaged. Bridget was consequently recast again to Ashley Jones in December 2004; Jones said whilst Oscar could return despite Oscar opting to stay in Denmark when Bridget returns. Bridget consequently confirms that she cancelled her engagement to Oscar.

== Storylines ==
Having been born and mostly raised in Atlantic City, New Jersey, Oscar (also known as Oz) and his father move to Las Vegas after the death of Oscar's mother. Oscar operates his father's casino but the mob in Las Vegas want to control it. Oscar calls his uncle Massimo Marone (Joseph Mascolo) for help several times but Massimo rejects it as he wants to run a legitimate business and does not want to get to involved in Oscar's world. When Oscar is shot, Massimo's phone number is in his pocket when he is taken the emergency room. When Oscar wakes up in the hospital, he grabs medicine student Bridget Forrester (Jennifer Finnigan/Emily Harrison) and asks where Paolo is. Massimo tells Oscar that Paolo is dead because Oscar involved in a crooked business like his father was. The hitmen who shot Oscar come to the hospital to kill Oscar and take Bridget hostage, but she is able to defend herself. Oscar and Bridget become friends and Oscar ends up sharing a hospital room with Bridget's former sister-in-law, Amber Moore (Adrienne Frantz), which both Oscar and Amber are unhappy about. Oscar finds out that the father of Amber's son is Deacon Sharpe (Sean Kanan), who Oscar used to be good friends with until he started embezzling funds in Oscar's father's casino, and who he and his father kicked out of Las Vegas for cheating in casinos and stealing. Amber wants Oscar's help in getting custody of her son but Oscar refuses. Oscar is shocked when he finds out that Deacon used to be married to Bridget.

Oscar tells Bridget about his dream of opening his own club and buys the Lair club and renames it to "Ozzz". Oscar gets Deacon's wife, Macy Alexander (Bobbie Eakes), to perform on the opening night of the club, but he is confronted by Scarface, who tried to kill Oscar in the hospital, and his boss Jimmy Walton. Oscar tells them to leave and they end up sabotaging the chandelier that is above Macy singing as revenge. Oscar tries to save Macy but he is too late as the chandelier falls on her and she is left in a coma. Deacon blames Oscar, who is inconsolable when Bridget tries to comfort him. Oscar turns the men in but blames himself, and apologises to Macy in the hospital. Oscar plans to shut the club down but realises how much it means to him. He then decides to start the "Macy Alexander Coma Research Foundation". Oscar proposes to Bridget and she accepts, but says she is not ready to have sex and wants a long engagement. Deacon and Amber try to break the couple up so Deacon can be with Bridget and Amber can be with Oscar. This is unsuccessful and Bridget and Oscar move to Holland so Bridget can finish her studies. However, Bridget (now Ashley Jones) returns to Los Angeles months later and reveals that she ended their engagement and the pair have split up

== Reception ==
In November 2003, whilst discussing the current storylines and characters of The Bold and the Beautiful, Nancy M. Reichardt from the Edmonton Journal wrote that while the soap had cast "popular actor" Gaskill as Oscar, she believed that it was too soon to tell if it would be "successful"; she also opined, "Gaskill is playing the role with an annoying accent of undetermined origin that could easily prove grating over the long haul."

A writer from La Crosse Tribune called Gaskill being taken off contract an "expected development" due to Oscar not having had "much to do" in the few months prior. Of the news, Dan J Kroll from Soap Central reported that whilst Gaskill had joined the soap with a lot of "fanfare", his screentime as Oscar had "shrunk to near non-existence", opining that the character had been a "relative no-show" in 2004. Kroll also found the timing of the news that Gaskill had opted out of his contract somewhat ironic due to the reports that the soap was trying to lure Hershey Presley to join the cast.

Kristyn Burtt from Soaps She Knows reported how some daytime viewers were surprised by Gaskill's decision to play Oscar rather than returning to All My Children. After Gaskill's stint on The Young and the Restless ended in March 2024, Burtt's colleague, Charlie Mason, suggested that Gaskill could reprise the role of Oscar on The Bold and the Beautiful. Mason believed that Oscar once being engaged to Bridget and having a "formidable rival" in Deacon for Bridget's affection, in addition to Macy being killed in Oscar's nightclub, "would make for a fantastically adversarial relationship on Bold & Beautiful — especially if Deacon leaned on Bridget in the wake of his latest fiancée Sheila Carter's death. (Well, supposed death!)"
