= Emily Harrison =

American actress (born 1977)

Emily Harrison (born June 13, 1977 in Louisiana, Missouri) is an American actress.

== Life ==
Harrison was born in Louisiana and she is most well known as Jennifer Finnigan's replacement in the role of Bridget Forrester on The Bold and the Beautiful, which she played from January to July 2004. Following a viewer backlash, Harrison's on-screen air time began to diminish, which was speculated to be the reason for her drop to recurring status after just a handful of episodes. Harrison's on-screen love interest, Brian Gaskill (Oscar Marone), was dropped from the show around the same time. By July the same year, Harrison had been dropped completely by the show and in November the character was recast with former The Young and the Restless star Ashley Jones (ex-Megan Dennison Viscardi).

Harrison's other TV appearances include guest stints on Lamb Chop's Play Along, CSI: NY, ER, and 7th Heaven. Notable film roles include Take (2007), Valley of the Heart's Delight (2006), Dickie Roberts: Former Child Star (2003), Ocha Cups for Christmas (2002) and Curse of the Puppet Master (1998).

She has two sons, Jackson Thomas (born in September 2003) and London La Brode (born in December 2006) with her husband Michael.
