= Sandra Nelson =

American actress (born 1964)

- Born: December 29, 1964 (age 61); Madison, Wisconsin, U.S.
- Other name: Sandra Nelson Winkler
- Occupation: Actress
- Years active: 1990–2025
- Known for: The Young and the Restless; The Wolf of Wall Street
- Spouse: Charles Winkler (m. 1998; div. 2012)
- Children: 2

Sandra Nelson (born December 29, 1964), is an American actress. Born in Madison, Wisconsin, she is best known for her role as Phyllis Summers on The Young and the Restless that she played from 1997 to 1999. She also played Aliyah Farran in The Wolf of Wall Street (2013).

== Personal life ==
Nelson married television and film director and producer Charles Winkler on September 6, 1998. They divorced in 2012. They have a daughter and a son.

== Select filmography ==
Nelson's other credits include guest roles:

- Highlander: The Series as Elaine Trent (Episode: "Avenging Angel") (1993)
- Star Trek: Deep Space Nine as Tavana (Episode: "Soldiers of the Empire") (1997)
- Star Trek: Voyager as Marayna (Episode: "Alter Ego") (1997)
- Strong Medicine as Kathleen Anderson (1 episode) (2000)
- Life as a House as Nurse (2001)
- ER as Michelle (Episode: "Makemba") (2003)
- De-Lovely as Sara Murphy (2004)
- Without a Trace as Stephanie Healy (Episode: "Transitions") (2005)
- Monk as Dr. Jackman (Episode: "Mr. Monk Can't See a Thing") (2006)
- Just Legal (1 episode) (2006)
- CSI: NY as Marilyn Bennett (1 episode) (2007)
- The Closer as Mrs. McFadden (1 episode) (2008)
- Reality as Isabella (2014)
- NCIS as Jessica Terdei (2 episodes) (2016)
- New Girl as French Woman (1 episode) (2016)
- Mommy's Little Dancer as Evelyn (short) (2025)

Preceded by Michelle Stafford	Phyllis Summers (role); 1997–99	Succeeded by Michelle Stafford
