= Red Ribbon Blues =

- Directed by: Charles Winkler
- Written by: Charles Winkler
- Produced by: Dale Rosenbloom; Brad Wyman
- Starring: Paul Mercurio; RuPaul; Debi Mazar
- Cinematography: Larry Blanford; Rudy M. Fenenga Jr.
- Edited by: Clayton Halsey
- Music by: John Frizzell
- Release date: June 7, 1996
- Running time: 97 minutes
- Country: United States
- Language: English
- Budget: $3,000,000 (estimated)

Red Ribbon Blues is a 1996 comedy-drama with classic heist/caper elements and written and directed by Charles Winkler and starring Paul Mercurio, RuPaul, and Debi Mazar. The film played the gay and lesbian film festival circuit in 1996.

== Plot ==
Troy and Duke have attended dozens of funerals for friends who have died of AIDS. Many of them were unable to afford the prohibitively expensive drugs they needed to stay alive. With their own funds running low, Troy and Duke decide to stage a series of robberies, stealing supplies of the life-saving drugs. Their heists are so successful that they're soon able to begin distributing medications throughout the community.

== Cast ==
- Paul Mercurio as Troy
- Debi Mazar as Darcy
- RuPaul as "Duke"
- John Epperson as Harold
- Lisa Waltz as "Bones"
- David Spielberg as Yorkin
- Leland Orser as James
- Alan Boyce as Craig
- Gabriella Lamiel as Nadine Scott
- Robert Sherman as Alex
- Steve Park as Kris Lee
- Margo Winkler as Helen
- Lee Mathis as Francis
- Paul Bartel as Fred, The Pharmacist
- Charles Winkler as Angry Man with Shotgun

== Reception ==
Steve Persall of the Tampa Bay Times praised the film, comparing its "lighter-in-tone" storyline to Robin Hood. He rated the film with a B+.

== Awards and nominations ==
It was nominated for a Special Grand Prize at Deauville Film Festival.
