= Shackles (film) =

- Directed by: Charles Winkler
- Written by: Donald Martin
- Produced by: Michael Williams
- Starring: D.L. Hughley
- Cinematography: Roy H. Wagner
- Edited by: Clayton Halsey
- Music by: Stephen Endelman
- Production company: Riker Productions, Inc
- Release date: September 20, 2005
- Running time: 115 mins.
- Country: United States
- Language: English

Shackles is a 2005 film directed by Charles Winkler and written by Donald Martin. It stars D.L. Hughley and Jose Pablo Cantillo. The poems featured in the film were written by Jerry Quickley.

== Cast ==
- D.L. Hughley as Ben Cross
- Jose Pablo Cantillo as Gabriel Garcia
- Jerry Quickley as Tone
- Mark Berry as Rasheed
- Daniel Louis Rivas as Pretty
- Barry Shabaka Henley as Virgil
- Georg Stanford Brown as Warden
- Kristen Wilson as Helen
- Pablo Santos as Minnow
- Vicellous Reon Shannon as Sammy One
- Paul Vincent O'Connor as Captain O'Leary
- Genoveze as El Perro
