= Rafe Kovich and Alison Barrington =

Rafe and Alison
- Port Charles character
- Brian Gaskill and Erin Hershey Presley as Rafe and Alison
- Duration: 2002–03
- Introduced by: Julie Hanan Carruthers
In-universe information
- Other names: Rali
- Family: Barrington
- Spouse: 2002–03
- Children: Rafe Kovich, Jr.

Rafe Kovich and Alison Barrington Kovich are a supercouple from the American soap opera Port Charles. Rafe was played by Brian Gaskill and Alison was played by Erin Hershey Presley. They were one of the most popular romantic pairings on the short-lived soap. The couple was not originally scripted into a romance. Once they were, they were written as star-crossed true loves with multiple obstacles to overcome. The couple is often referred by the portmanteau "Rali" (for Rafe and Alison) on Internet message boards.

== Background ==
Erin Hershey Presley was cast as Alison Barrington in 2000. For the first two years of her run, Alison's love interest was Jamal Woods. The character was crafted as, at first, shallow and spoiled. She then softened to be playful and charming. The breakup with Jamal and the romance with Rafe Kovich developed her into full adulthood. Rafe was created in 2001 as a vampire slayer and an angel. Brian Gaskill, who had portrayed an angel before in the short film Higher Grounds, was cast in the part. Gaskill told Soap Opera Weekly he was excited to be playing an angel again. "There's something about having that light," he said in the interview. "Playing someone who comes from there is very freeing." Rafe was written as "unconventional," allowing Gaskill to infuse his own "offbeatness" into the role. On other programs, he was not allowed the same freedoms to make the acting choices he wanted. "I would make choices on some shows and they'd say, 'That's really quirky and interesting, but guess what? Not on this show! You've got to be the good-looking cool guy.'" Gaskill credited the role for helping him in his personal life as well as with his acting. "It has opened me up as much as an actor and as a person in ways that I never expected," he said in an interview with Soap Opera Update. "It's been a little bit of back and forth between me and Rafe. I'm bringing to Rafe, but Rafe is giving to me. That's where I'm at. Sort of a coming of age a little late."

Port Charles began dividing its storytelling into thirteen-week arcs called books. Rafe was introduced in Book Three, "Tainted Love." "Tainted Love" was supposed to be the only story arc Rafe was featured in but his stay extended to the next arc, "Tempted", then through "Miracles Happen". He then became a regular character. The show's executive producer Julie Hanan Carruthers "told me that one of the reasons I'm still around is because it's been palatable," Gaskill said. "They weren't sure if an angel on the show would get too corny. Somehow, I've been able to make it easy for people to take." The character continued on the series until Port Charles was canceled in 2003.

Rafe and Alison were not originally scripted into a romance with each other. "The greatest thing about their relationship is that it's just something that sort of happened organically," Gaskill said. He and Hershey Presley, who were friends off-screen, created an unintentional on-screen chemistry that did not work with the story they were acting out. They were occasionally told to tone it down by not smiling so much. "We really had to fight against it," Gaskill said. The story was soon changed into a romance between Gaskill and Hershey Presley's characters. Port Charles' co-head writer Barbara Estensen compared the actors onscreen connection to magic.

The couple was written as star-crossed true loves with multiple obstacles in their way. One of the storylines the couple was written into was filmed on location in Fillmore, California at Historic Old Town. "The writers said they really needed a sweeping ending to "Torn" [Book Eight], like in a 1940s movie," Carruthers said. "We found this great, obviously very charming little venue to shoot that totally looks like Port Charles- and the train is so romantic, we couldn't pass it up." Port Charles had taken on an accelerated taping schedule that gave the cast and crew a summer hiatus. The shoot took place on July 30, 2002 meaning Gaskill, Hershey Presley, as well as 150 extras, stunt people, and crew members had to take a day off from their summer hiatus. Hershey Presley, who had married Brian Presley three days before hand, postponed her honeymoon for the shoot. In the story, Alison was leaving Port Charles by train after accepting that Rafe was gone. Just as her train pulled away, Rafe returned to Earth for a permanent stay. He chased after her and jumped onto the moving train. The train used was an early-1900s Pullman car. Since the scenes were shot during the day and the story setting was night, the windows of the car had to be blacked out to simulate nighttime. For Rafe jumping onto the moving train, Gaskill wanted to perform his own stunt. He attempted the jump on his own, surprising the producers. A lookalike stunt man was used instead.

On December 30, 2002, Rafe and Alison's failed wedding aired in the premiere episode of the tenth book, "Surrender". For the event, the usually half-hour show extended to a full hour. Hershey Presely experienced discomfort in the wedding dress costume. "It had a corset top that laced up in the back and took a really long time to get into," she said. "And there was a lot of beading under the arms that rubbed me raw!" She tucked pieces of silk into the bodice of the dress to cover the beading. During her scenes she said she "popped them in her top."

== Storyline ==
Rafe Kovich is a vampire slayer who is related to Lucy Coe. He comes to Port Charles in order to help the citizens of that city destroy the vampire Caleb Morley. Years before in 1991, Caleb killed Rafe. In an angel form, Rafe has come back to destroy him. When he meets Alison, she is dating her current love interest, Jamal. During one of their first encounters Rafe uses his angel powers to heal Alison after a tree falls on her. Alison later learns he is an angel and agrees to keep it a secret. He shows her some of his magic by making a pink rose grow. He slowly begins to fall in love with her.

After Caleb is defeated, Rafe's mission is to fix all of the romantic problems of the Port Charles residents. He does so with Alison's help. Meanwhile, her relationship with Jamal is under strain because of the child he recently discovered he had. On Christmas Eve, Rafe's time is up and he disappears. He begs his boss, Ed, for permission to go back to earth. Ed lets him go but Rafe has to give up his angel powers forever. Rafe and Alison kiss but Alison feels guilty and returns to her boyfriend. She and Jamal are still having problems. Rafe wants to tell Alison how he feels about her but does not want to interfere in her relationship with Jamal. Alison later reads his journal and discovers how he feels about her. Afterwards, she can not make love with Jamal. They soon break up. Alison fights her feelings for Rafe but the two soon make love in an old barn, which becomes their special place. Even though Rafe has to eventually return to heaven, the two marry themselves in their barn. Rafe goes back to Heaven again.

Rafe and Alison have a difficult time letting each other go. Alison discovers special candles an ancestor of hers made. When she lights one that says, "love" she feels close to him. Rafe makes a deal with James, an entity from hell, in order to come back to earth. But there was a twist. Rafe's memory was wiped out and he had no memory of Alison. The deal that is, if he does not fall in love with Alison again within a certain amount of time, he will have to give up his soul. When Rafe returns to Port Charles, he has his memories restored up until the time of his death. He has no idea that he is an angel.

Livvie Locke, Alison's former best friend, takes advantage of the amnesiac when she finds him. She convinces him that they were lovers and that they had plans to marry. But Rafe begins having flashes of a blonde woman with whom he believes he shares a connection with. This woman is Alison.

Meanwhile, Alison is being hospitalized after a collapse due to an aneurysm. When Rafe stumbles upon her in the hospital room, he recognizes her from his dreams. He impulsively kisses the comatose Alison, waking her up. Alison is shocked to realize that Rafe has no memory of their relationship and that he believes he is engaged to Livvie. Rafe and Livvie marry at his and Alison's barn, which he mistakenly thinks is his and Livvie's special place.

When Livvie realizes that Rafe is starting to remember Alison, she sleeps with a supernatural creature called the Avatar and becomes pregnant. She tells Rafe they are expecting a child. A confrontation with Alison causes Livvie to fall down a flight of stairs. Though Livvie's fall is accidental, she blames Alison. Rafe, believing that Alison has tried to break him and Livvie up, tells Alison to stay away from them. Soon after, Livvie has a miscarriage. This devastates Rafe.

Rafe found himself falling in love with Alison, despite his devotion to Livvie. Alison explains that they had been together before Livvie interfered, and they were very much in love. Rafe contemplates everything Alison has told him and confronts Livvie. She accuses Alison of being jealous and that everything she said are lies. Unconvinced, Rafe decides to continue his friendship with Alison and finally declares his love for her. With his task accomplished, Rafe regains his memory, just as Livvie arrives to find the couple in an embrace. Aiming a gun at the two of them, Livvie is crazed with anger. Rafe pushes Alison away as Livvie shot the gun, and is fatally wounded.

Depressed about losing Rafe again, Alison decides to leave town. As the train she was riding on took off, she sees a figure outside her window. It is Rafe, running after her. It turns out that Rafe's father, who is also an angel, takes pity on the tragic couple and allows his son to return to Earth for good.

Problems come their way when the vampire and Rafe's enemy, Caleb Morley, returns to Port Charles. Rafe and Caleb continue to try destroying each other, but learn they can not because it would disturb the balance of good and evil on Earth. Unable to beat each other, Rafe and Caleb, who has a romantic relationship with Alison's nemesis Livvie, are forced to co-exist in the small town. On Rafe and Alison's wedding day, Caleb tricks Alison into thinking Rafe might be her long lost brother. They find proof that they were not related and the couple reunite. Caleb's assistant, Joshua Temple, takes over as the top vampire after Caleb is turned mortal. He takes over Port Charles and tries to make Alison his bride. Caleb and Rafe work together to defeat Joshua. Rafe slays him and rescues Alison.

Further troubles are caused when Livvie steals Caleb's magic ring. She makes a wish with it that inadvertently causes Caleb and Alison to have sex in her and Rafe's barn. Devastated by what she has done, Alison feels she has to tell Rafe the truth. She tries unsuccessfully to tell him but never gets the words out. Rafe wants to marry Alison legally. The couple eventually marries not knowing that Alison is pregnant and Caleb could be the father.

Once Alison gave birth to her son, she was surprised to discover her child had Caleb's dark hair, not Rafe's fair hair. Rafe pursued Caleb, but it was revealed that Rafe was never seen alive again. Alison returned to Port Charles with her son, whom she named Rafe.

In 2013, on General Hospital Alison and a now teenage Rafe returned to Port Charles and learned that Lucy had been arrested for stabbing John McBain, whom she mistaken for Caleb. Afraid that they might be in danger, Alison gave Rafe a metal spear to use as protection while she headed to the police station where she runs into John, whom she mistakes as Caleb. When she starts to flee, she runs into Sam Morgan, whom she mistakes for Livvie, when she tries to convince Sam to come with her, Sam refuses and Alison takes off but later reached out to McBain to talk to him. When he arrives at the docks for the meeting with Alison, he finds Rafe leaning over his mother's lifeless body, holding the spear she'd given him. The spear was covered in blood.

== Reception and impact ==
Rafe and Alison received praise from both viewers and critics. Soap Opera Digest listed them as one of soaps hottest duos in their Valentine's Day issue. For the feature, Gaskill and Hershey Presley were interviewed. In discussing the couple's success, Hershey Presley cited her and Gaskill's off-screen friendship. "We're friends and when you're friends with someone, your communication is good," she said. "Plus, we can totally joke around with each other." Gaskill's take on Rafe and Alison's popularity was his and Hershey's on-screen connection. "It's the natural chemistry we [as actors] have," he said. "Alison has the heart of an angel, and Rafe is an angel, so there's that definite connection there too. But somewhere along the line, Erin and I clicked."

Viewers called Rafe and Alison "the hottest thing on Port Charles". At a fan club dinner, members of the Port Charles fan club voted Rafe and Alison as Best Couple, Gaskill as Best Actor, and Hershey Presley as Best Actress. Soap Opera Update named them the best couple from Port Charles for both the years 2002 and 2003.

Magazine's praised Gaskill and Hershey Presley's performances in the storylines focusing around the Rafe and Alison romance. Soap Opera Digest named Hershey Performer of the Week in their February 19, 2002 issue for her performance in portraying Alison as torn between Jamal and Rafe. Soap Opera Weekly's Joe Diliberto also praised Hershey for her work during "the crumbling of Alison's relationship with Jamal" and the beginning of her romance with Rafe. Diliberto said, "As Port Charles Alison, Erin Hershey mixed heaping amounts of amiability with dollops of sadness and a dash of bittersweet to come up with a performance sweeter than any candy." In the February 5, 2002 issue of Soap Opera Weekly, Gaskill was named Outstanding Performer of the Week. In the article, Joanne Gallo praised him for making "falling in love appear fresh and new," noting how difficult that is to do on a soap opera. "Gaskill's breakout character- aided by his breakout performance- is a welcome change from brooding Caleb." TV Guide also applauded the premiere of Port Charles's tenth book, "Surrender," because the expanded episode gave Hershey Presley more time to "showcase her range"—range they believed she deserved a Daytime Emmy Award nomination for.

== See also ==
- List of supercouples
