= Şebnem Dönmez =

Turkish actress

- Born: May 17, 1974 (age 52); Salzgitter, West Germany
- Occupations: Actress, presenter
- Years active: 1992–present
- Spouse: Ezel Akay (m. 2004; div. 2007)

Şebnem Dönmez (born May 17, 1974 in Salzgitter, West Germany) is a Turkish movie and television series actress and host of television shows.

== Career ==
Originally a model, she debuted in 1992 at the television scene taking part in a motorsports show of TRT, at that time Turkey's only channel. Şebnem Dönmez kept on appearing in and hosting several TV shows since then.

She acted in a stream of Turkish films and television series. The first international movie she acted in was The Net 2.0, a Hollywood production shot in Istanbul. She performed on stage with one of the leading roles in Oyunun Oyunu (Noises Off) by Michael Frayn.

== Personal life ==
In 2005, she married the film director Ezel Akay. Their marriage ended after two years.

== Filmography ==
=== Film ===
Year	Title	Role	Notes
2002	Mumya Firarda	Leyla	
2002	Kolay Para	Hülya	
2004	Neredesin Firuze	Melek	
2006	Hacivat Karagöz Neden Öldürüldü?	Ayşe Hatun	
2006	The Net 2.0		
2007	O Kadın		
2009	Vali	Ceyda Aydın	
2017	Misafir		
2018	Çakallarla Dans 5	Müjgan	

=== Television series ===
Year	Title	Role	Notes
1990	Üç Arkadaş		
1991	Ahmet Hamdi Bey Ailesi		
1993	Üç Kişilik Dünya		
1994	Bir Demet Tiyatro		
1994	Zzzzt FM		
1999	Aşkın Dağlarda Gezer	Kejal	
1999	Kulaktan Kulağa		
1999	Şans Melekleri		
1999–2000	Ne Şeker Şey		
2000	Eyvah Kızım Büyüdü	Roza	
2001	Uçur Beni		
2001	Kulaktan Kulağa		
2002	Aslı ile Kerem	Aslı	
2003	Ölümsüz Aşk	Eylül	
2004	Size Baba Diyebilir miyim?	Serap	
2006	Erkeksen Seyret	Leyla	
2007	Eşref Saati	Truva Feraye	
2008	Nerede Kalmıştık?		
2010	Küçük Sırlar	Ece Altınel	
2012	Yalan Dünya	Canan	
2012–2013	Kuzey Güney	Melda Yalgın	
2013–2015	Medcezir	Asude Sude Beylice	
2018–2019	Avlu	Nihal Ünal	
2020	Zemheri	Mehveş Demirkan	
2021	Son Yaz	Serap Gök	
2022–2023	Yasak Elma	Handan Kılıç	
2024	Kızılcık Şerbeti	Heves Şifacıgil	

=== Television programs ===
Year	Program/Award ceremony	Notes
1996–98	Sabah Şekerleri	TV program, with Murat Başoğlu
1997–98	Görevimiz Tehlike	TV program, with Murat Başoğlu
1997	3rd Kral TV Video Music Awards	presented with Murat Başoğlu
1998	Cumartesi Gecesi Ateşi	TV program
2000	6th Kral TV Video Music Awards	presented with Ziya Kürküt
2005	42nd Antalya Golden Orange Film Festival	presented with Korhan Abay
2007	Her Şeyi Bilmek Gerekmiyor	TV program
2007	Bak Kim Dans Ediyor	TV program
2008	Laf Ebeleri	TV program
2009	16th International Adana Golden Boll Film Festival	
2014	21st International Adana Golden Boll Film Festival	presented with Mehmet Aslan

== Theatre ==
Year	Title	Role	Notes
2003	3. Türden Yakın İlişkiler		
2004	Tanrım Beni Baştan Yarat		
2007	Noises Off		
