= Erin Hershey Presley =

American actress (b. 1976)

- Born: Erin Alise Hershey; September 2, 1976 (age 49); Seattle, Washington
- Occupation: Actress
- Years active: 1996–2013
- Spouse: Brian Presley (m. 2002; div. 2019)
- Children: 3

Erin Hershey Presley (born Erin Alise Hershey on September 2, 1976) is an American former actress.

== Career ==
Hershey Presley is most known for her role as Alison Barrington, during the last four years (2000–2003) of the American soap opera Port Charles. From 2002 to 2003, she and actor Brian Gaskill formed the supercouple of Rafe Kovich and Alison Barrington on the show.

The same year Port Charles was cancelled, Lisa Ling left her role as a co-host of ABC's The View. Hershey Presley joined the on-air auditions to replace Ling, advancing to the three finalists, before the co-host job went to Elisabeth Hasselbeck.

Her last film appearance was in the 2010 movie Once Fallen, starring her husband, Brian Presley. Her next, and last, acting role was in 2013, when she reprised the Alison character on General Hospital for four episodes; Alison returned to Port Charles, along with her son Rafe Jr. (Jimmy Deshler), but was soon murdered.

== Personal life ==
Hershey Presley grew up on Mercer Island, Washington and attended Mercer Island High School.

On July 27, 2002, she married her Port Charles co-star, Brian Presley. She gave birth to their first child, Jackson "Jack" Gunnar, in January 2007. The couple later had a daughter together, Emma. It was announced that they were expecting another daughter together, to be named Ruby Rose. They divorced in 2019.

== Filmography ==
- 2000–2003 - Port Charles as Alison Barrington Kovich, series regular
- 2004 - General Hospital as Alison Barrington, one episode
- 2005 - Will & Grace as Nicole, episode "Partners"
- 2005 - Living with Fran as Susan, episode "The Reunion"
- 2007 - Americanizing Shelley as Nicole
- 2010 - Once Fallen as Beat's mom
- 2013 - General Hospital as Alison Barrington, three episodes
