= Georgia Rule =

2007 film by Garry Marshall

- Theatrical release poster
- Directed by: Garry Marshall
- Screenplay by: Mark Andrus
- Produced by: David Robinson; James G. Robinson
- Starring: Jane Fonda; Lindsay Lohan; Felicity Huffman; Dermot Mulroney; Cary Elwes; Garrett Hedlund
- Cinematography: Karl Walter Lindenlaub
- Edited by: Bruce Green; Tara Timpone
- Music by: John Debney
- Production company: Morgan Creek Productions
- Distributed by: Universal Pictures
- Release date: May 11, 2007
- Running time: 113 minutes
- Country: United States
- Language: English
- Budget: $20 million
- Box office: $25 million

Georgia Rule is a 2007 American comedy-drama film directed by Garry Marshall and written by Mark Andrus. It stars Jane Fonda, Lindsay Lohan and Felicity Huffman. The film follows a rebellious teenager (Lohan) who is sent to spend the summer with her grandmother (Fonda) when her frustrated mother (Huffman) cannot control her unruly behavior. Dermot Mulroney, Cary Elwes, Garrett Hedlund, Laurie Metcalf, and Héctor Elizondo also appear in supporting roles.

Georgia Rule was theatrically released in the United States on May 11, 2007, by Universal Pictures. The production of the film came to media attention when a warning letter from Morgan Creek Productions CEO James G. Robinson to Lohan was leaked online on The Smoking Gun; in it, Robinson criticized Lohan's heavy partying and lateness on set. Georgia Rule was panned by critics, but the lead cast (Fonda, Lohan and Huffman) was praised for their performances. Having grossed $25 million against a budget of $20 million, the film is considered a box-office bomb.

== Plot ==
Rachel Wilcox is a promiscuous, heavy-drinking young woman, whose drug addiction and rebellious ways are starting to spiral out of control. With her repeated negative behavior, she has violated the final rule in her mother Lily's San Francisco home. With nowhere else to take her, Lily hauls her to the one place she swore she would never return to: her grandmother Georgia's house in Idaho.

Georgia Randall lives life by a few definitive rules—God comes first and hard work reigns—and whoever is under her roof must do the same. Paired with her granddaughter for the summer, Georgia needs to find patience to understand Rachel's fury. Georgia gets her granddaughter a receptionist job with Dr. Simon Ward, the local veterinarian, who also treats people. Dr. Ward's nephews, Sam and Ethan, are often at Georgia's.

As Simon does not show interest in Rachel or other women, she thinks he is gay. However, his sister Paula Richards tells her he is mourning the death of his wife and son, killed in a car accident three years earlier. He refuses to have sex with Rachel even when she tries to seduce him but retains some feelings for her mother Lily, who he once dated.

Rachel performs oral sex on Harlan Wilson, not yet married and still a virgin because of his LDS (Mormon) religion. He confesses to his girlfriend, June Smith, who is shocked. Later, a team of LDS girls spy on Harlan and Rachel to make sure he does not have sex again. After chasing them with Harlan's truck, Rachel explains to them that what happened is over and they can go back to having their summer fun.

They agree, but tell Rachel to go home, leading her to threaten them by saying if they have anything to do with her and Harlan again, she will find all of their boyfriends and "f*** them stupid". This shocks the girls into stopping their spying and insulting of Rachel.

While trying to make a point to Simon about her survival, Rachel bluntly says that her stepfather, Arnold, sexually molested her when she was between the ages of 12 and 14. Seeing the effect of her revelation, Rachel tries to convince him she lied. However, Simon tells Georgia about the abuse, and in turn, Georgia tells Lily, who initially thinks she is lying.

Heartbroken, Lily comes to believe her daughter. She begins to drink heavily and asks Arnold for a divorce. When he arrives at her house, Georgia tells him to leave, refusing to let him in the house. She hits him with a baseball bat and finally threatens his new Ferrari. Rachel sees that Lily cannot accept the truth, so she lies to her and says she wasn't molested.

At the motel where Arnold is staying, Rachel tells him that she has a videotape of them having sex when she was 14 and, while seeming not to believe her, decides to back away from the family. She demands 10 million dollars if he does not keep Lily happy and admits to him she lied and told Lily he didn't molest her because she does not want her to be upset anymore. On the way back to San Francisco, when Arnold tells Lily he is giving Rachel his Ferrari, Lily realizes he is guilty.

Lily flies into a rage and Arnold finally admits to having molested Rachel, saying that she seduced him, that Lily's alcoholism drove him to it, and that Rachel enjoyed it. Arnold drives off and leaves Lily to walk back. Georgia, Simon, Rachel and Harlan catch up with her in Harlan's pickup truck, and a tearful Rachel apologizes to her mother for her behavior. Harlan tells Georgia he is in love with Rachel, and plans to marry her when he returns from his two-year mission.

== Cast ==
- Jane Fonda as Georgia Randall, Lily's estranged mother and Rachel's rule-abiding grandmother.
- Lindsay Lohan as Rachel Wilcox, a promiscuous, drug addicted, heavy-drinking young woman, Lily's daughter and Georgia's granddaughter
- Felicity Huffman as Lily Wilcox, Georgia's daughter and Rachel's mother who married Arnold
- Dermot Mulroney as Dr. Simon Ward, the local veterinarian and Lily's high-school friend
- Cary Elwes as Arnold
- Garrett Hedlund as Harlan Wilson
- Laurie Metcalf as Paula Richards
- Héctor Elizondo as Izzy
- Dylan McLaughlin as Sam
- Zachary Gordon as Ethan
- Tereza Stanislav as violin teacher
- Fred Applegate as townie #1
- Cynthia Ferrer as townie #2
- Destiney Moore as waitress
- Christine Lakin as Grace
- Chelse Swain as June Smith
- Shea Curry as Melody

== Production ==
Ostensibly set in Idaho, per the ending credits and DVD extras, the film was actually shot in Southern California, and much of the scenery was created with computer-generated imagery.

The production of Georgia Rule came to media attention when a warning letter from Morgan Creek Productions CEO James G. Robinson to Lindsay Lohan was leaked online on The Smoking Gun; in it, he criticized her heavy partying and lateness on set, calling her "discourteous, irresponsible and unprofessional" and comparing her to a "spoiled child".

== Reception ==
=== Critical response ===
Georgia Rule received negative reviews from critics. On Rotten Tomatoes, the earned a 19% rating from 118 reviews. The site's consensus states: "Comedic and dramatic in all the wrong places, Georgia Rule is a confused dramedy that wastes the talents of its fine cast." On Metacritic with a score of 25% based on reviews from 29 critics, indicating "generally unfavorable" reviews. Audiences polled by CinemaScore gave the film an average grade of "B-" on an A+ to F scale.

Richard Roeper of Chicago Sun-Times gave the film a two out of four review, stating that "it's a shame Lohan's best work to date is bogged down in a film that wants to be in the same league as Terms of Endearment, but is only marginally better than Divine Secrets of the Ya-Ya Sisterhood." Georgia Rule was rated the second worst movie of 2007 by AOL.

=== Accolades ===
The film received two nominations at the 2007 Teen Choice Awards, for "Choice Movie – Chick Flick" and "Choice Actress – Drama" for Lohan's performance. Felicity Huffman received a Prism Award nomination for "Best Performance in a Feature Film", with the movie winning "Best Feature Film".

Year	Ceremony	Award	Result
2007	Teen Choice Awards	Choice Movie – Chick Flick	Nominated
2007	Teen Choice Awards	Choice Movie Actress – Drama: Lindsay Lohan	Nominated
2008	Prism Awards	Best Feature Film	Won
2008	Prism Awards	Performance in a Feature Film: Felicity Huffman	Nominated
2008	Young Artist Awards	Best Performance in a Feature Film – Supporting Young Actor – Comedy or Musical: Zachary Gordon	Won
2008	Young Artist Awards	Best Performance in a Feature Film – Supporting Young Actor – Comedy or Musical: Dylan McLaughlin	Nominated

== Home media ==
Georgia Rule was released on DVD on September 4, 2007. The Blu-ray was released by Shout! Factory, under their Shout Select label, on July 12, 2022.
