= Streets of Blood =

2009 film directed by Charles Winkler

- Film poster
- Directed by: Charles Winkler
- Screenplay by: Eugene Hess
- Story by: Eugene Hess; Dennis Fanning
- Produced by: Randall Emmett
- Starring: Val Kilmer; 50 Cent; Brian Presley; Jose Pablo Cantillo; Michael Biehn; Sharon Stone
- Cinematography: Roy H. Wagner
- Edited by: Clayton Halsey
- Music by: Steven Endelman
- Production companies: Millennium Films; Nu Image; Emmett/Furla Films
- Distributed by: Anchor Bay Entertainment
- Release date: July 28, 2009
- Running time: 95 minutes
- Country: United States
- Language: English
- Box office: $210,074

Streets of Blood is a 2009 American action crime film directed by Charles Winkler, and starring Val Kilmer, 50 Cent, Michael Biehn and Sharon Stone. It has a screenplay by Eugene Hess, based on a story by Hess and Dennis Fanning. The film was produced by Nu Image/Millennium Films.

== Plot ==
During the rage of Hurricane Katrina, Detective Andy Devereaux (Val Kilmer) discovers the body of his former partner in a warehouse. Quickly forgetting about his discovery, he joins a newly transferred detective named Stan Johnson (Curtis "50 Cent" Jackson) trying to end a conflict involving looters.

Post-Katrina, Andy and Stan are now partners. They work with corrupt detectives Pepe (Jose Pablo Cantillo) and Barney (Brian Presley), who are caught up in the murder of an undercover narcotics agent. Investigating the escalating police corruption in New Orleans is FBI Agent Brown (Michael Biehn). Brown brings up his thoughts to Police Captain Friendly (Barry Shabaka Henley) who insists he is doing his best to solve the problems in his department.

Meanwhile, police therapist Nina Ferraro (Sharon Stone) tries to help the detectives with their struggles, with little avail. She is particularly interested in Andy, whose father, also a detective, was murdered in the line of duty.

Things are complicated further with Agent Brown's investigation into Andy and his crew. Brown tells Andy that he has an informant who is leaking out the details, and Andy, disbelieving at first, begins to resign himself to the fact that one of his men is betraying him.

After Captain Friendly is assassinated by a local gangster named Chamorro, Andy, Stan, Pepe, and Barney decide to take the law into their own hands and go after Chamorro. While interrogating Chamorro, they find out that Brown has been supplying the drug dealer with information about the police raids, to help his own investigation. In a violent shootout, Barney accidentally shoots and kills Pepe.

Andy and Stan escape, only to return to the warehouse where they met. There Andy realizes that Stan is the informant. After the two start arguing, Brown shows up and there is another shootout, ending in Brown's death. Andy comforts a sobbing Stan, then kills him, as he possibly did with his previous one.

The film ends on a low note, leaving no premise about Andy's future.

== Cast ==
- Curtis "50 Cent" Jackson as Stan Johnson
- Val Kilmer as Andy Devereaux
- Sharon Stone as Nina Ferraro
- Michael Biehn as Agent Michael Brown/Drug Dealer
- Jose Pablo Cantillo as Pepe
- Brian Presley as Barney
- Barry Shabaka Henley as Capt. John Friendly

== Production ==
Filming took place in Shreveport, Louisiana, including some shooting at the Louisiana Wave Studio.

While in development the film went through some director and casting changes with Winkler replacing Tim Hunter and Kilmer replacing Robert De Niro. It also went through several name changes with the film being called Microwave Park and New Orleans at various points before finally settling on Streets of Blood.

As of April 2010, the movie is available on DVD at Blockbuster Video, Redbox and Netflix.

== See also ==
- List of hood films
