= Seth Morgan =

Seth Morgan may refer to:

- Seth Morgan (novelist) (1949–1990), American novelist
- Seth Morgan (politician) (born 1978), former Republican member of the Ohio House of Representatives
- Seth Morgan (The Young and the Restless), a fictional character from the American soap opera The Young and the Restless
