= Rocky Marciano (film) =

1999 American TV film

- DVD cover
- Genre: Biography; Drama; Sport
- Written by: William Nack; Larry Golin; Charles Winkler; Dick Beebe
- Directed by: Charles Winkler
- Starring: Jon Favreau; George C. Scott; Judd Hirsch; Penelope Ann Miller
- Music by: Stanley Clarke
- Countries of origin: United States; Canada
- Original language: English

Production
- Producer: Rob Cowan
- Cinematography: Paul Sarossy
- Editor: Clayton Halsey
- Running time: 99 minutes
- Production company: Winkler Films

Original release
- Network: Showtime
- Release: May 15, 1999

Rocky Marciano is a 1999 television film directed by Charles Winkler and presented by MGM. It tells the story of the rise to fame of legendary boxer Rocky Marciano, played by Jon Favreau. The film premiered on Showtime on May 15, 1999.

== Plot ==
The film shows Rocco's childhood through his fight with his hero Joe Louis. After the Louis fight it flashes forward to his post career, leading up to his death in a 1969 plane crash. The film is noted for its "...blow-by-blow account of the Marciano-Louis fight," that is presented as a turning point in Marciano's career.

== Cast ==
- Jon Favreau as Rocky Marciano
- Penelope Ann Miller as Barbara Cousins
- Judd Hirsch as Al Weill
- Tony Lo Bianco as Frankie Carbo
- Duane Davis as Joe Louis
- Rino Romano as Allie Colombo
- George C. Scott as Pierino Marchegiano
- Rhoda Gemignani as Pasquelina Marchegiano
- Aron Tager as Charley Goldman
- Noah Danby as Carmine Vingo

== Production ==
The story is based on a memoir by William Nack.

In an interview given to Entertainment Weekly, Favreau explained that he had followed an intensive training to prepare himself for the role. The director of the film, Charles Winkler, is the son of Irwin Winkler, producer of the Rocky franchise.

== Reception ==
The movie has received mostly mixed to bad reviews. Mick Martin and Marsha Porter, authors of A DVD & Video Guide - 2005, found the biopic "...perfectly portraying the spirit of the heavyweight. The events and characters are compelling and engaging..."

A review in Variety only praised some aspects of the film including the acting and cinematography:

"...the execution also works... Winkler utilizes the flashbacks sensibly, laying the groundwork for Marciano’s bizarre behavior after his career ended. And though he doesn’t always achieve the right emotional tone—a lot of potent scenes seem soft—his steady approach is commendable. Tech credits are topnotch, highlighted by Clayton Halsey’s precise editing and Paul Sarossy’s smooth lensing."
—Michael Speier, Variety

A review in TV guide was less praiseworthy, stating, "Favreau lands this production’s sole knockout punch: He captures both the undefeated heavyweight champ's outward bravado and inner insecurity. Fight fans will cheer the restaging of famous bouts, but the unconvincing performances of much of the cast undermines the drama." Richard Sandomir, writing for The New York Times, criticized extensively the film's lack of accuracy, judging it is a "docudrama that only occasionally lets truth stand in the way of the story.

== Awards and nominations ==
Canadian Society of Cinematographers Awards

- 1999: Won, "Best Cinematography in TV Drama"

Motion Picture Sound Editors

- 2000: Nominated, "Best Sound Editing - Television Movies and Specials - Effects & Foley"

== See also ==
- List of boxing films
