= Lightchild =

American music editor

Mitsuko Alexandra Yabe
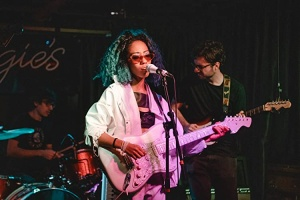
- Yabe performing
- Born: December 14, 1991 (age 34); New York City
- Occupations: Musical artist; record producer; pop artist; multi-instrumentalist; film composer
- Website: loveisthevision.com

Mitsuko Alexandra Yabe (born December 14, 1991), known professionally as Lightchild (stylized as llghtchlld), is an American and Japanese musician, composer, and music editor.

== Early life ==
Yabe was born in New York City. Growing up, she was influenced simultaneously by both American and Japanese culture. Her music career began with the study of classical violin under the tutelage of Roberta Guaspari and Lynelle Smith of Opus 118 Harlem School of Music.

== Career ==
After graduating from Pomona College, she moved back to New York City to pursue a career in the arts and entertainment industry. She got a job transcribing interviews for producers on the reality crime series The First 48 (2004–present) for ITV Studios (formerly Granada Entertainment) and she eventually joined the Editors Guild as an edit room assistant, the equivalent to an apprentice on the West Coast.

She has collaborated with film directors and composers on several soundtracks as a music editor, including Boots Riley's Sorry To Bother You (2018) and Radha Blank's The Forty-Year Old Version (2020).

== Recognition ==
Award	Year	Nominated work	Category	Result	Ref.
Golden Reel Awards	2021	The Forty-Year-Old Version	Outstanding Achievement in Sound Editing – Feature Musical	Nominated	
