= Christopher Kennedy (music editor) =

British artist

Christopher Kennedy is a British music editor, photographer, and sculptor, who worked mainly in the United States. He is known for his music editing work on feature films.

== Career ==
Kennedy moved to the United States in 1985.

He spent many years as a music editor, working on over 70 Hollywood feature films in Los Angeles.

He moved to Bucks County, Pennsylvania, in 2002 to concentrate on fine art photography. He developed a technique which he calls Photo Luminism, after noticing an effect created when taking pictures of harbor lights in 2008.

In 2016 Kennedy's proposal for the New Hope Arts Outdoor Sculpture Contest, "Exhibitionist" based on three of his Photo Luminism images, was a winner, and was subsequently built in opaque fiberglass by Kennedy and his partner Mark Hutzky. The larger than life three-piece sculpture is internally illuminated by almost 2000 animated LEDs. It was installed in New Hope PA in October 2019.

== Awards and nominations ==
Kennedy was nominated for one Emmy Award in 2009, as part of the sound editing team on The Courageous Heart of Irena Sendler, and three Golden Reel Sound Awards for Unfaithful, De-Lovely, and Rameses.

He collaborated with composer Jan AP Kaczmarek on the Oscar-winning score for Finding Neverland (2004).
