= Home of the Brave (2006 film) =

2006 film by Irwin Winkler

- Theatrical release poster
- Directed by: Irwin Winkler
- Screenplay by: Mark Friedman
- Story by: Mark Friedman; Irwin Winkler
- Produced by: Avi Lerner; George Furla; Irwin Winkler; Rob Cowan
- Starring: Samuel L. Jackson; Jessica Biel; Brian Presley; Curtis Jackson; Chad Michael Murray
- Cinematography: Tony Pierce-Roberts
- Edited by: Clayton Halsey
- Music by: Stephen Endelman
- Production companies: Metro-Goldwyn-Mayer; Emmett/Furla Films; Millennium Films; Winkler Films
- Distributed by: MGM Distribution Co.
- Release date: December 20, 2006
- Running time: 106 minutes
- Country: United States
- Language: English
- Budget: $12 million
- Box office: $499,620

Home of the Brave is a 2006 American drama film directed by Irwin Winkler and starring Samuel L. Jackson, Jessica Biel, Brian Presley, Curtis Jackson and Chad Michael Murray. It follows the lives of four Army National Guard soldiers in Iraq and their return to the United States.

The film was shot in Ouarzazate, Morocco and in Spokane, Washington.

The film was released by Metro-Goldwyn-Mayer on December 20, 2006. It was a critical and box office bomb.

== Plot ==
After learning their unit will soon return home, Lieutenant Colonel Dr. William Marsh, Sergeant Vanessa Price, Specialists Tommy Yates and Jamal Aiken, and Private Jordan Owens participate in a final mission, to convoy medical supplies to a remote Iraqi village. The lead vehicles are trapped in a narrow street by an insurgent ambush and the remainder escape the initial barrage by taking a detour into an improvised explosive device. Sergeant Price, a driver, is seriously wounded and her front passenger killed instantly, and another soldier in their team is killed in a pursuit. Fighting out of the ambush, Aiken trips on loose bricks and injures his back leaving Yates and Owens to continue alone. They engage insurgents in a graveyard and Yates is wounded. Owens pursues a sniper and is shot from behind, dying in the late-arriving Yates' arms. Price and Aiken are transported via medevac helicopter to a field hospital. Marsh, treating patients, is threatened by a soldier seeking priority treatment for a comrade. Price's right hand is amputated. Aiken survives his wounds and returns to the unit when they rotate back to the US. Price is remanded to a formal hospital for physical therapy and fitting for a non-functioning rubber prosthesis.

The main characters have a hard time returning to civilian life back home in Spokane, Washington. Price struggles to adapt to losing a hand and return to work as a P.E. teacher and basketball coach. Yates has lost his job at a gun shop during his deployment and his father pushes him towards the police academy. Yates, affected by Aiken's experience of being denied VA benefits for his back injury and rejection by his girlfriend, walks out of the academy's entrance exam.

Marsh slides into self-destructive behavior as his son, angry about the war's effect on his family, gets into trouble at school. Drunk on Thanksgiving Day, Marsh brings home three yard workers for dinner to the dismay of his family. His wife later catches him in his study with a loaded pistol contemplating suicide. He enters therapy for PTSD and reveals he doesn't feel any emotion over the soldiers that died, but as a doctor he believes he should. The conflict had slowly eaten away at him until he could not control it anymore.

Aiken is shot and killed by the police at a drive through coffee stand where his girlfriend worked; a result of him taking her and her co-workers hostage with a pistol to force her to talk to him. Marsh's wife reaffirms her love for him and offers to help him through counseling. Price falls in love with another coach at her school, whom she had rejected earlier while trying to transition back to her life. Yates has an emotional outburst at his father's shop and re-enlists. As the film ends, Marsh's son is happily playing in a soccer match at Price's school. Price introduces her new boyfriend to Marsh's wife and confirms dinner plans with them. Yates undergoes basic training again and is shown patrolling the streets of an Iraqi city.

== Cast ==
- Samuel L. Jackson as Lieutenant Colonel Dr. William "Will" Marsh M.D.
- Jessica Biel as Sergeant Vanessa Price
- Brian Presley as Specialist Tommy Yates
- Curtis "50 Cent" Jackson as Specialist Jamal Aiken
- Chad Michael Murray as Private Jordan Owens
- Christina Ricci as Sarah Schivino
- Victoria Rowell as Penelope Marsh
- Vyto Ruginis as Hank Yates

== Reception ==
=== Box office ===
The film was opened in only 3 theaters in 2006 and earned $51,708 at the box office domestically and $447,912 in the rest of the world. Originally released on December 15, 2006 for Oscar consideration, the production studio re-thought the release pattern and decided to pull it from theaters, planning on showing it to a wider audience later in the year. It was re-released on May 11, 2007 in 44 theaters, but this did not increase the film's financial earnings.

=== Critical reception ===
On the review aggregator website Rotten Tomatoes, 23% of 57 critics' reviews are positive, with an average rating of 4.2/10. The website's consensus reads: "The ensemble cast works hard, but hammy direction and a script lacking in nuance ruins this movie's noble intentions." Metacritic, which uses a weighted average, assigned the film a score of 42 out of 100, based on 15 critics, indicating "mixed or average" reviews.

The A.V. Club named it in its top 100 flops. TV Guide gave the film 2 stars out of 4 and commented that the film "starts with a bang and ends in a long, protracted whimper" and Stephen Holden from The New York Times said you "feel as if you have just sat through an earnest made-for-television movie" and in the end "an honorable dud".

=== Home media ===
The Numbers reported 236,905 units sold, accounting for revenue of $4,735,731.

== Awards ==
It was nominated for a Golden Globe award for Best Original Song ("Try Not to Remember") which was performed by Sheryl Crow. Jessica Biel and Samuel L. Jackson each received a Prism Award nomination for Performance in a Feature Film.
