= Brian Presley =

American actor

- Born: Brian Joshua Presley; August 18, 1977 (age 48); Midland, Texas, United States
- Occupation: Actor
- Years active: 1998–present
- Spouse: Erin Hershey Presley (m. 2002; div. 2019)
- Children: 3

Brian Joshua Presley (born August 18, 1977) is an American actor and director.

== Career ==
Presley started his career with a handful of guest appearances on television shows such as Beverly Hills, 90210, Any Day Now, and 7th Heaven.

His big break came in 2000 when he landed the role of Jack Ramsey on the soap opera Port Charles. He portrayed Jack from 2000 until Port Charles was canceled in 2003. In 2004, he produced and starred in the film Guarding Eddy. In 2006, he starred in End Game and Home of the Brave. Borderland was released in 2007.

In the film Touchback, released in April 2012, he plays a high school football star (as Presley was in real life) who suffers a career-ending injury and becomes a farmer, but later receives a second chance at athletic success.

His directorial debut The Great Alaskan Race, which he wrote, produced and starred in along with Treat Williams, Henry Thomas and Bruce Davison which premiered at the San Diego International Film Festival on October 18, 2019.

== Personal life ==
Presley was born in Midland, Texas, two days after the death of Elvis Presley, who Brian is unrelated to. He graduated from Jenks High School in Jenks, Oklahoma in 1996 where he was the quarterback for the state championship-winning football team (1993). He was also active in choir and show choir at the school and had the leading role in the high school's musical his senior year.

Presley was a walk-on for the University of Arkansas football team for one year. He visited Southern California, appeared in a commercial, and decided to try acting. He attended the business school at the University of Southern California.

He was married to his Port Charles co-star Erin Hershey Presley until 2019 when the divorce was finalized. He and Erin have three children.

== Filmography ==
=== Film ===
Year	Film	Role	Notes
2004	Guarding Eddy	Eddy	
2006	End Game	Billy Bergoon	
2006	Home of the Brave	Tommy Yates	
2007	Borderland	Ed	
2009	Streets of Blood	Barney Balentine	
2009	Once Fallen	Chance	
2012	Touchback	Scott Murphy	
2016	USS Indianapolis: Men of Courage	Waxman	
2019	The Great Alaskan Race	Leonhard Seppala	Also director
2022	Hostile Territory	Jack Calgrove	Also director
2024	Outlaw Posse	Shotgun	

=== Television ===
Year	Show	Role	Notes
1998	Beverly Hills, 90210	Biddler	Episode: "Budget Cuts"
1998	Any Day Now	Teresa's Boyfriend	Episode: "Please Don't Tell My Mother"
1998	Moesha	Unknown role	Episode: "A Terrible Thing Happened on My Tour of College"
1999	7th Heaven	Mark Tripp	Episode: "The Tribes That Bind"
1999	Malibu, CA	Bill	Episode: "Jason's New Job"
2000–03	Port Charles	Jack Ramsey	
