= Stephen Endelman =

- Born: August 18, 1962 (age 64)
- Origin: London, England, U.K.
- Genre: Film score
- Occupations: Composer, music producer
- Instruments: Piano, clarinet
- Years active: 1991–present

Stephen Endelman is a British born classical composer and conductor. He is best known for his soundtracks including The Englishman Who Went Up a Hill But Came Down a Mountain (1995), Ed (1996), City of Industry (1997), Finding Graceland (1998), The Proposition (1998), Jawbreaker (1999), Evelyn (2002), Home of the Brave (2006) and Redbelt (2008). He wrote the Grammy nominated score for De-Lovely (2004) and the incidental music for the Rose Center for Earth and Space at the American Museum of Natural History.

== Early life ==
Endelman studied as a clarinetist at the Purcell School of Young Musicians when he was twelve years old. He subsequently studied composition at Guildhall School of Music and Drama in London and Banff School of Fine Arts in Alberta, Canada. Endelman composed two operas at age eighteen as a prodigy. He moved to New York City to develop his film music career in 1992. He scored the Broadway production of Eugene O'Neill's A Moon for the Misbegotten, which won a Tony Award. Endelman made his film debut the following year with Robert De Niro's A Bronx Tale. His second film, Household Saints, was released the same year.

== Career ==
Endelman has worked with such distinguished directors and Broadway writers as Nancy Savoca, Irwin Winkler, David O. Russell, Lesli Linka Glatter, John Irvin, Andrew Lloyd Webber, John Duigan and Bruce Beresford. Endelman has additionally written for two operas, one Broadway theatrical production, and the incidental music at New York's Hayden Planetarium. His music accompanies the first two planetarium shows, Passport to the Universe, narrated by Tom Hanks and The Search for Life, Are We Alone?, narrated by Harrison Ford. He has since acted as resident artist at the Metropolitan Opera Guild.

== Personal life ==
In the early 1970s Endelman attended the now-closed Carmel College. While there, he was sexually abused for more than two years by a housemaster.

In 2009, he suffered from a rare form of brain cancer, and was comatose for three months.

In 2015 police advised him that he'd been called as a witness in their prosecution of Trevor Bolton, his abuser at Carmel College. Bolton was later sentenced to 19 years in prison.

He wrote, produced and composed the music for the short film A Boy, a Man and a Kite (2019). In the film, a dying man, trapped in a coma, revisits his younger self, who is trying to escape the grip of sexual abuse from his teacher.
