= Once Fallen =

- Directed by: Ash Adams
- Written by: Ash Adams
- Produced by: Amy Madigan; Adam Griffin; Lisa Kearns
- Starring: Brian Presley; Taraji P. Henson; Ed Harris
- Cinematography: Tarin Anderson
- Edited by: Bruce Cannon; Gary Chan
- Music by: Jeff Beal
- Production company: Emmett/Furla Films
- Distributed by: Bravado Pictures; Freedom Films
- Release date: April 24, 2010 (Newport Beach)
- Running time: 93 minutes
- Country: United States
- Language: English

Once Fallen is a 2010 crime film starring Brian Presley, Taraji P. Henson, and Ed Harris. Filming took place in Los Angeles, California.

== Plot ==
Chance returns home from a half decade in jail, determined to change his life. He tries to make peace with his father, the head of the Aryan Brotherhood at the prison where he is serving a life sentence for murder. Chance's release is quickly marred when he has to help his best friend with a debt to a local mobster. When Chance gets home to his ex-girlfriend's house, he finds out that he has a son named August. After he meets Pearl, a friend of his ex-girlfriend, Chance then sets himself on the path of changing his life around.

== Cast ==
- Brian Presley as Chance Ryan
- Taraji P. Henson as Pearl
- Ed Harris as Liam Ryan
- Chad Lindberg as "Beat"
- Amy Madigan as Rose Ryan
- Peter Weller as Eddie
- Ash Adams as Rath
- Peter Greene as Sonny

== Music ==
The soundtrack to Once Fallen was released on November 9, 2010.

No.	Title	Artist	Length
1.	"Once Fallen"	Jeff Beal	2:24
2.	"Prison Fight"	Jeff Beal	1:43
3.	"Let's Leave Town"	Jeff Beal	1:45
4.	"Water"	Jeff Beal	2:03
5.	"There Are No Rules"	Jeff Beal	1:22
6.	"Liam Explodes"	Jeff Beal	1:50
7.	"Rath Gets the Coke"	Jeff Beal	2:44
8.	"Deal"	Jeff Beal	1:06
9.	"Pearl / Meeting with Liam"	Jeff Beal	2:33
10.	"Body in the Car"	Jeff Beal	1:08
11.	"Beat and Liam"	Jeff Beal	1:36
12.	"The Kidnap"	Jeff Beal	2:20
13.	"If I Go, You Go"	Jeff Beal	4:17
14.	"The Kiss"	Jeff Beal	2:01
15.	"Funny How It Goes"	Jeff Beal	0:57
16.	"Beat Dies"	Jeff Beal	2:06
17.	"Father and Son"	Jeff Beal	1:48
18.	"Reunion"	Jeff Beal	0:55
19.	"To Chance"	Jeff Beal	2:56
20.	"A Gift from Beat / End Credits"	Jeff Beal	5:46
Total length:			43:20
