= Brian Gaskill =

American actor (born 1970)

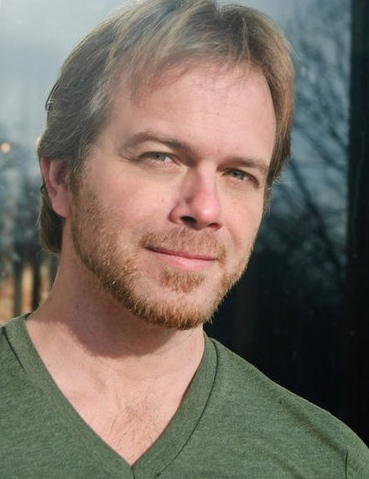
- Born: Brian Richard Gaskill; January 22, 1970 (age 56); Honolulu, Hawaii, U.S.
- Education: State University of New York, Purchase (BFA)
- Occupations: Actor, Director
- Years active: 1994–present

Brian Richard Gaskill (born January 22, 1970, in Honolulu, Hawaii, raised in Neptune Township, New Jersey) is an American actor.

== Career ==
While living in Neptune, he attended Red Bank Regional High School as a drama major in the school's Academy of Visual and Performing Arts. He went on to receive his B.F.A. from the acting conservatory at State University of New York at Purchase.

His television debut was in the series Models Inc. in 1994. In 1995, he was cast as Bobby Warner in the soap opera All My Children, on which he appeared until 1997.

In 2000 he played Brian, the love interest of Justin Theroux’s character in The Broken Hearts Club: A Romantic Comedy. In 2001 he appeared in the role as angel/vampire hunter Rafe Kovich on the General Hospital spinoff Port Charles. The show was canceled in 2003.

After Port Charles was canceled, he appeared as Oscar Marone on The Bold and the Beautiful from 2003 to 2004.

From September 2005 to December 2005, Gaskill briefly joined the cast of As the World Turns as B.J. Green. Gaskill and his wife, Tonya Watts, welcomed their first child, Alabama Zoe, on September 26, 2005.

In March 2007, Gaskill joined the cast of Guiding Light as a recast of Dylan Lewis, the son of Reva Shayne and Billy Lewis and the estranged father of Daisy Lemay.

In 2010, Brian also been directed music videos; including one for Georgette Jones that included her legendary father George Jones, and one for Americana/Rock/Blues artist Anne McCue called "don't go to Texas (without me). The later video made it into the top ten in 2010 on Logo; an MTV subsidiary.

In December 2023, it was announced he had joined the cast of The Young and the Restless in the role of Seth Morgan. On March 5, 2024, Gaskill announced on his social media accounts that his final episode was airing that day, with his character Seth having been killed.

== Filmography ==
Television roles
Year	Title	Role	Notes
1994–1995	Models Inc.	David Michaels	Main role (episodes 1–11)
1995–1997	All My Children	Bobby Warner (#3)	Contract role: June 15, 1995, to July 26, 1997
2001–2003	Port Charles	Rafe Kovich	Contract role: August 17, 2001, to October 3, 2003
2003–2004	The Bold and the Beautiful	Oscar Marone	Contract role: September 11, 2003, to June 8, 2004
2005	As the World Turns	B.J. Green	Recurring role: September 27, 2005, to December 28, 2005
2007–2008	Guiding Light	Dylan Lewis (#2)	Recurring role: March 2, 2007, to January 16, 2008
2010	No Ordinary Family	Maitre 'd	Episode: "No Ordinary Mobster"
2012–2015	The Bay	Chase Walker	Recurring role
2015	Castle	David Lacey	Episode: "Cool Boys"
2022	A Bachelor's Valentine	Paul Bachelor	Starring Role
2024	The Young and the Restless	Seth Morgan	16 episodes

== See also ==
- Rafe Kovich and Alison Barrington
