= Entertainment Industries Council =

American nonprofit media organization

The Entertainment Industries Council is a United States non-profit organization founded in 1983 that promotes the depiction of accurate health and social issues in film, television, music, and comic books. The Council provides guidelines on the depictions of these issues to the entertainment industry, generally promoting content that includes negative consequences of addiction, dependency and violence.

== EIC Awards ==
The Entertainment Industries Council honors films and television programs that make a positive difference in the world honoring film and TV programs which portray realistic depictions of dependence, in an annual, star-studded, televised awards show.

=== Prism Awards ===
The Annual Prism Awards honors the creative community for accurate portrayals of substance abuse, addiction and mental health in entertainment programming. Past winners and nominees have included the films Walk the Line, Thirteen, Ray, City of God, Skins, Blow, Traffic, The Insider and Purgatory House. TV shows, episodes and movies of the week honored have included programs such as: Augusta, Gone, Monk, Private Practice (for Caterina Scorsone's portrayal of Amelia Shepherd's Oxycodone addiction and her recovery), The Office, Desperate Housewives, Pinky and the Brain (for an episode about the dangers of cigarette smoking), ER, Boston Legal, American Dad! (for the episode "Spring Break-Up"), The Simpsons (for the season 11 episode, "Days of Wine and D'oh'ses," which featured Barney Gumble trying to quit drinking alcohol after realizing how much his alcoholism was limiting his quality of life), Castle in its fourth season for its story arc focusing on Kate Beckett's post-traumatic stress disorder, If You Really Knew Me and General Hospital.

==== Theatrical Feature Film ====
1997 Trainspotting
1998 Gridlock'd
1999 Down in the Delta
2000 The Insider
2001 Traffic
2002 Blow
2003 Skins
2004 City of God (original title Cidade de Deus)
2006 Self Medicated
2007 Thank You for Smoking (wide release) and Sherrybaby (limited release)
2008 Georgia Rule
2009 Rachel Getting Married tied with Rolling
2010 Crazy Heart (for substance abuse) and The Soloist (for mental health)
2011 Black Swan (for mental health) and The Fighter (for substance abuse)
2012 Shame tied with Take Shelter (for mental health) and Warrior (for substance abuse)
2013 Silver Linings Playbook (for mental health) and Flight (for substance abuse)
2014 Hope (for mental health) and The Spectacular Now (for substance abuse)
2015 Still Alice

=== Joyce Foundation Funding ===
The EIC received an 18 month, $125,000 grant in 2004 from the Joyce Foundation, a major financial sponsor of gun control organizations.
