= Charles Winkler =

American director, producer (active 1979– )

- Born: U.S.
- Occupations: Director; Producer
- Years active: 1979–present
- Spouse: Sandra Nelson (m. 1998; div. 2012)
- Children: 2
- Parents: Irwin Winkler (father); Margo Winkler (mother)

Charles Winkler is an American television and film director and producer. He is the son of Academy Award-winning producer and director Irwin Winkler and actress Margo Winkler. He was married to actress Sandra Nelson from 1998 until their divorce in 2012. As of June 2025, his most recent credit is as one of the producers for The Alto Knights (2025).

== Partial filmography as director ==
- You Talkin' to Me? (1987)
- Disturbed (1990)
- Red Ribbon Blues (1996)
- Rocky Marciano (1999)
- At Any Cost (2000)
- Shackles (2005)
- The Net 2.0 (2006)
- Streets of Blood (2009)
