= Life as a House =

2001 film by Irwin Winkler

- Original poster
- Directed by: Irwin Winkler
- Written by: Mark Andrus
- Produced by: Rob Cowan; Irwin Winkler
- Starring: Kevin Kline; Kristin Scott Thomas; Hayden Christensen; Jena Malone; Mary Steenburgen
- Cinematography: Vilmos Zsigmond
- Edited by: Julie Monroe
- Music by: Mark Isham
- Production company: Winkler Films
- Distributed by: New Line Cinema
- Release date: October 26, 2001
- Running time: 125 minutes
- Country: United States
- Language: English
- Budget: $27 million
- Box office: $23.9 million

Life as a House is a 2001 American drama film produced and directed by Irwin Winkler, from a screenplay by Mark Andrus. It stars Kevin Kline, Kristin Scott Thomas, Hayden Christensen, Jena Malone and Mary Steenburgen. The story focuses on a man (Kline) who is anxious to repair his relationship with his ex-wife and teenage son after he is diagnosed with terminal cancer.

The film was released by New Line Cinema in October 2001. It received mixed reviews, though newcomer Christiansen's performance was widely praised and earned him a Golden Globe nomination for Best Supporting Actor — Motion Picture, as well as a National Board of Review Award for Breakthrough Performance.

== Plot ==
George Monroe, a jaded architectural model fabricator, is living the bachelor's life in the old family shack on the coast of California. Over the years, George has been avoiding getting up to modern CAD technology standards and eventually is fired from the architecture firm. When the principal owner refuses to let George keep a few of his models, he destroys all but one of the models with a roll of design plans. As he exits the building with the remaining model, he collapses and is rushed to the hospital, where it is revealed he has advanced stage cancer and any treatment would be futile.

George, with a time limit of only 3–4 months on his life, decides to demolish the shack left to him by his father and build his own custom house. He enlists his son, Sam, who is alienated from his mother Robin and stepfather Peter, a wealthy investor. Sam, who was planning to spend the summer at his friend Corey's house in Tahoe, is forced to spend his summer with George, who has not yet revealed his terminal condition, and help his dad with the house. Initially, Sam makes it a point not to help George demo the old house. When George refuses to give Sam money unless he works for it, Sam toys with becoming a prostitute, influenced by his classmate Josh, but is nearly caught and flees from his first encounter. This leads him to steal George's Vicodin.

George slowly reconnects with Sam through tearing down the shack and building the house. Robin decides to assist with building the house as well, and she finds herself rediscovering George. Also joining in the construction are Alyssa, Sam's classmate who lives next door with her mother Colleen; local policeman Kurt Walker, George's childhood friend; Sam's young half-brothers Adam and Ryan; various neighbors; and eventually Peter, even after separating from Robin when she tells him that her feelings for George have re-awakened. George tells Robin of his disease, sending her into shock. George tells Sam, who feels betrayed and accuses George of being selfish and takes refuge at Alyssa's house. George collapses and is found by Robin the following morning. Complications arise when neighbor David Dokos tries to halt construction because the building's height exceeds the allowable limit by six inches. His plans to halt the project are stopped by Sam, who recognizes him from his prostitution attempt based on the Black Lexus he owns and blackmails him.

Sam puts Christmas lights all over the unfinished house and shows George the gleaming house from his hospital window. The next morning, Sam returns to finish the house and Robin sits beside George until his death. Robin goes to the house and tells Sam about his father's death. Sam inherits the house he finished building. Sam gives the property to a woman who has been living in a trailer park because it's what George would have hoped for. As a girl, she was injured in a car crash caused by his grandfather.

== Cast ==
- Kevin Kline as George Monroe
- Kristin Scott Thomas as Robin Kimball
- Hayden Christensen as Sam Monroe
- Jena Malone as Alyssa Beck
- Mary Steenburgen as Colleen Beck
- Jamey Sheridan as Peter Kimball
- Ian Somerhalder as Josh
- Scott Bakula as Kurt Walker
- Sam Robards as David Dokos
- John Pankow as Bryan Burke
- Mike Weinberg as Adam Kimball
- Scotty Leavenworth as Ryan Kimball
- Jon Foster as Corey

== Production ==
In Character Building: Inside Life as a House, a bonus feature on the DVD release of the film, director Irwin Winkler confesses he never realized the rekindling love between George and Robin was a key aspect of the script until he saw the emotion displayed by Kevin Kline and Kristin Scott Thomas in their scenes together. Winkler encouraged his cast to improvise moments leading into and following their scripted dialogue, many of which were included in the final film.

In From the Ground Up, another DVD bonus feature, production designer Dennis Washington discusses how he was required to construct an entire street of houses leading to Sam's house, which was perched on a cliff overlooking the Pacific Ocean in Palos Verdes, California. The new house was built on another site, then dismantled and transported to the film set as each section was needed. Because the film tracked the progress of the dismantling of the old house and the construction of the new one, it had to be shot in sequence. When the film was completed, the house was dismantled, moved, reconstructed, and enlarged to become a library for the Kenter Canyon Elementary School in Brentwood.

An official soundtrack containing Mark Isham’s original score was released on October 30, 2001. The film includes the songs "What You Wish For" and "Rainy Day" by Guster, "That's the Way" by Gob, "Live a Lie" and "Somewhere" by Default, "Sweet Dreams" by Marilyn Manson, "Water" by ohGr, "Re-Arranged" by Limp Bizkit, "Both Sides Now" by Joni Mitchell, "Gramercy Park" by Deadsy, and "How to Disappear Completely" by Radiohead.

== Release ==
The film premiered at the Toronto International Film Festival and was shown at the Boston Film Festival before going into limited release in the US on October 26, 2001.

== Reception ==
=== Box office ===
The film opened in twenty-nine theaters in the US and grossed $294,056 on its opening weekend. It eventually earned $15,667,270 in the US and $8,236,521 in foreign markets for a total worldwide box office of $23,903,791.

=== Critical response ===
Life as a House received mixed reviews from critics. The review aggregator website Rotten Tomatoes reported that 47% of critics have given the film a positive review based on 106 reviews, with an average rating of 5.27/10. The site's critics consensus reads, "A manipulative tearjerker, Life as a House benefits from fine performances from the cast." On Metacritic, the film has a weighted average score of 45 out of 100 based on 32 critics, indicating "mixed or average" reviews. Audiences polled by CinemaScore gave the film an average grade of "A" on an A+ to F scale.

Stephen Holden of The New York Times wrote “‘Life as a House,’ directed by Mr. Winkler from a screenplay by Mark Andrus, certainly means well, and its be-here-now philosophy is unarguably valuable. But as it follows George's final months during a summer in which he forms a solid bond with his estranged son, it doesn't trust the audience enough to keep from laying on the schmaltz.”

Roger Ebert gave the film two-and-a-half stars, noting “some episodes in the movie seem especially contrived.” However, he praised the performances of Kline and Thomas, saying the actors “are able to deepen their characters by sheer skill and depth of technique, so that we like them and care what happens to them.”

Despite the film's mixed reception, Christensen's performance received widespread praise. In a review for Entertainment Weekly, Lisa Schwarzbaum said “Christensen — soon to hit pinup status in ”Star Wars” II and III as Anakin Skywalker — is a joy to watch, but when he’s not on screen, this movie is less instructive about the tools of life than any episode of ”This Old House.”

=== Awards and nominations ===
Award	Category	Recipient	Result	Ref.
Golden Globe Awards	Best Supporting Actor — Motion Picture	Hayden Christensen	Nominated	
Screen Actors Guild Awards	Outstanding Performance by a Male Actor in a Leading Role	Kevin Kline	Nominated	
Screen Actors Guild Awards	Outstanding Performance by a Male Actor in a Supporting Role	Hayden Christensen	Nominated	
National Board of Review Awards	Breakthrough Performance	Hayden Christensen	Won	
Aspen Filmfest	Audience Award for Favorite Feature	Irwin Winkler	Won	

== Home media ==
New Line Home Entertainment released the film on DVD on March 26, 2002. It includes commentary by director/producer Irwin Winkler, producer Rob Cowan, and screenwriter Mark Andrus, as well as deleted scenes (one with William Russ, who was originally cast as Kurt Walker but replaced when he was injured in a motorcycle accident after filming began).
