= Irwin Winkler =

American film producer and director (born 1931)

- Born: May 25, 1931 (age 95); New York City, U.S.
- Education: B.A. New York University
- Occupations: Film director, producer
- Years active: 1967–present
- Spouse: Margo Winkler (after 1959)
- Children: Charles Winkler; David Winkler; Adam Winkler
- Parent(s): Sol Winkler; Anna Winkler
- Website: winklerfilms.com

Irwin Winkler (born May 25, 1931) is an American film producer and director. He is the producer or director of over 58 motion pictures, dating back to 1967's Double Trouble, starring Elvis Presley. The fourth film he produced, They Shoot Horses, Don't They? (1969), starring Jane Fonda, was nominated for nine Academy Awards. He won an Oscar for Best Picture for 1976's Rocky. As a producer, he has been nominated for Best Picture for four films: Rocky (1976), Raging Bull (1980), The Right Stuff (1983), and Goodfellas (1990).

== Early life and education ==
Winkler was born on May 25, 1931 to a Jewish family in New York City, to Sol and Anna Winkler. Growing up in Coney Island, one of his first jobs was on a bumper ride on the boardwalk. Winkler graduated early from high school and got into New York University, but felt out of place among the older and more mature students, many of whom were former World War II soldiers that had entered university under the G.I. Bill. At the outbreak of the Korean War, he volunteered to join the Army and was stationed in Louisiana for two years. After completing his service, Winkler returned to New York University and went on to receive a degree in American Literature in 1955.

== Early career ==
Winkler's first job after graduating university was at the William Morris talent agency. Among his first clients as an agent were comedians Sammy Shore and Jackie Vernon, though Winkler says of himself he was a "mediocre" agent.

After meeting Robert Chartoff, who managed several comedians, including Jackie Mason, the two set up their own talent management company. One of the "unsuccessful clients" the William Morris Agency allowed him to take with him at the time that he had options on, was the actress Julie Christie, whose screentest for Doctor Zhivago they arranged. Through another of their clients, Winkler and Chartoff brokered the John Schlesinger film Darling to film producer Joseph E. Levine. This deal led them from talent management to film production.

== Career as film producer and director ==
Forming the production company Chartoff-Winkler Productions, Winkler began producing films with his partner Robert Chartoff in the late 1960s. Their first effort (along with Judd Bernard), was Double Trouble (1967) starring Elvis Presley . Their next film was John Boorman's thriller Point Blank (1967) starring Lee Marvin, which is now regarded as a classic. Adding Sydney Pollack to their production team for one project, they garnered critical acclaim for They Shoot Horses, Don't They? (1969). Their next film, The Strawberry Statement (1970), won the Jury Prize at Cannes. Chartoff and Winkler achieved their greatest success yet with Rocky (1976), which earned the Academy Award as Best Picture. Subsequently, the producing duo picked up Best Picture Oscar nominations for Raging Bull (1980) and The Right Stuff (1983), their last project together before Chartoff-Winkler Productions dissolved in 1985.

Winkler produced such noteworthy features as The Right Stuff (1983) which received eight Academy Award nominations with four wins, Round Midnight (1986) which garnered two Academy Award nominations. He then produced back-to-back Costa-Gavras films, Betrayed (1988) and Music Box (1989), which was nominated and won the Golden Bear at the Berlin Film Festival, before receiving another Best Picture Oscar nomination for Goodfellas (1990). He also produced Rocky II (1978), Rocky III (1982), Rocky IV (1985) and Rocky V (1990).

Winkler moved into the director's chair, debuting with Guilty by Suspicion (1991), a drama (which he also scripted) about the Hollywood blacklist that starred Robert De Niro, which was nominated for the Palme d'Or at the 1991 Cannes Film Festival. His second feature, a remake of Night and the City, also starred De Niro and was chosen as the closing feature for the 1992 New York Film Festival. Winkler fared excellently at the box office as the writer-director of the Sandra Bullock vehicle The Net (1995), which spawned a series of the same name debuting on the USA Network in 1998.

Life as a House (2001) made its world debut at the 2001 Toronto Film Festival and told the tale of a depressed dying man (Kevin Kline) who funnels his energies into rebuilding the dilapidated beach shack he inherited from his abusive father and, in the process, building bridges between himself and his disaffected son (Hayden Christensen). After this film received critical praise, Winkler re-teamed with Kline for the follow-up De-Lovely (2004), casting the actor as the lead in his biographical film about American composer Cole Porter, which centered on his unique relationship with his wife and muse (Ashley Judd) and was chosen as the closing night film at the 2004 Cannes Film Festival.

While his directorial career would last through 2006, Winkler continued to produce his share of films, including The Shipping News (2001), Enough (2002), the 2014 remake of The Gambler—he'd also produced James Toback's 1974 original—and his further return to the Rocky franchise with Rocky Balboa (2006) and the spin-offs Creed (2015), which was nominated for multiple awards including 6 NAACP Image Awards, winning 4, and Creed II (2018). His work with Scorsese continued on with The Wolf of Wall Street (2013), Silence (2016), and The Irishman (2019) which was Winkler's first collaboration with Netflix.

In 2019, Winkler published his autobiography, A Life in Movies: Stories from 50 years in Hollywood. The New York Times wrote: "Winkler looks back fondly on a career producing some of the most successful films of the 20th century."

== Personal life ==
Winkler married his wife Margo Winkler in 1959 while still working at WMA in New York. They moved to Los Angeles in 1966. Margo was originally from California and her parents, Irma and Charlie Melson, were former vaudeville performers. The couple have three sons, Charles Winkler, David Winkler, and Adam Winkler. Winkler's youngest son Adam is a professor of constitutional law at the UCLA School of Law and a published author.

== Filmography ==
Director

Year	Title	Director	Producer	Writer
1991	Guilty by Suspicion	Yes	No	Yes
1992	Night and the City	Yes	Yes	No
1995	The Net	Yes	Yes	No
1999	At First Sight	Yes	Yes	No
2001	Life as a House	Yes	Yes	No
2004	De-Lovely	Yes	Yes	No
2006	Home of the Brave	Yes	Yes	Yes
TBA	Ally Clark	No	Yes	Yes

Producer

- Double Trouble (1967)
- Point Blank (1967) (Uncredited)
- Blue (1968)
- The Split (1968)
- They Shoot Horses, Don't They? (1969)
- Leo the Last (1970)
- The Strawberry Statement (1970)
- Believe in Me (1971)
- The Gang That Couldn't Shoot Straight (1971)
- The New Centurions (1972)
- Thumb Tripping (1972)
- The Mechanic (1972)
- Up the Sandbox (1972)
- Busting (1974)
- S*P*Y*S (1974)
- The Gambler (1974)
- Peeper (1974)
- Breakout (1975)
- Rocky (1976)
- Nickelodeon (1976)
- New York, New York (1977)
- Valentino (1977)
- Uncle Joe Shannon (1978)
- Rocky II (1979)
- Raging Bull (1980)
- True Confessions (1981)
- Rocky III (1982)
- Author! Author! (1982)
- The Right Stuff (1983)
- Rocky IV (1985)
- Revolution (1985)
- Scandal Sheet (1985) (TV movie)
- Round Midnight (1986)
- Betrayed (1988)
- Music Box (1989)
- Goodfellas (1990)
- Rocky V (1990)
- The Juror (1996)
- The Shipping News (2001)
- Enough (2002)
- The Net 2.0 (2006) (Direct-to-video)
- Trespass (2011)
- The Gambler (2014)
- Survivor (2015)
- Creed (2015)
- Silence (2016)
- Creed II (2018)
- The Irishman (2019)
- Creed III (2023)
- The Alto Knights (2025)

Executive producer

- Comes a Horseman (1978)
- The Net (1998−99) (Also writer)
- Rocky Balboa (2006)
- The Mechanic (2011)
- The Wolf of Wall Street (2013)

As an actor

Year	Film	Role
1998	Welcome to Hollywood	Himself

Thanks

Year	Film	Role
1998	Welcome to Hollywood	Special thanks

== Accolades ==
Year	Award	Category	Film	Result	Ref.
1976	Academy Awards	Best Picture	Rocky	Won	
1980	Academy Awards	Best Picture	Raging Bull	Nominated	
1983	Academy Awards	Best Picture	The Right Stuff	Nominated	
1990	Academy Awards	Best Picture	Goodfellas	Nominated	
2003	American Society of Cinematographers Awards	Board of Governors Award	—N/a	Won	
2001	Aspen Filmfest	Audience Favorite Feature Award	Life as a House	Won	
2016	Awards Circuit Community Awards	Best Motion Picture	Silence	Nominated	
2015	Black Reel Awards	Outstanding Film	Creed	Won	
1990	British Academy Film Awards	Best Film	Goodfellas	Won	
1991	Cannes Film Festival	Palme d'Or	Guilty by Suspicion	Nominated	
2019	Chicago Indie Critics Awards	Best Studio Film	The Irishman	Nominated	
1989	Chicago International Film Festival	Lifetime Achievement Award	—N/a	Won	
2015	Christopher Awards	Best Feature Film	Creed	Won	
1995	Deauville American Film Festival	Lifetime Achievement Award	—N/a	Won	
2016	Gold Derby Awards	Best Motion Picture	Silence	Nominated	
1976	Golden Globe Awards	Best Motion Picture – Drama	Rocky	Won	
1980	Golden Globe Awards	Best Motion Picture – Drama	Raging Bull	Nominated	
1983	Golden Globe Awards	Best Motion Picture – Drama	The Right Stuff	Nominated	
1990	Golden Globe Awards	Best Motion Picture – Drama	Goodfellas	Nominated	
1985	Golden Raspberry Awards	Worst Picture	Revolution	Nominated	
1985	Golden Raspberry Awards	Worst Picture	Rocky IV	Nominated	
1990	Golden Raspberry Awards	Worst Picture	Rocky V	Nominated	
1999	Hollywood Film Awards	Outstanding Achievement in Producing	—N/a	Won	
2008	Israel Film Festival	Lifetime Achievement Award	—N/a	Won	
1999	Joseph Plateau Awards	Joseph Plateau Honorary Award	—N/a	Won	
2006	National Board of Review Awards	Career Achievement Award in Producing	—N/a	Won	
2019	Online Film & Television Association Awards	Best Picture	The Irishman	Nominated	
2002	Palm Springs International Film Festival	Lifetime Achievement Award	—N/a	Won	
2016	Producers Guild of America Awards	David O. Selznick Achievement Award	—N/a	Won	
1985	Stinkers Bad Movie Awards	Worst Picture	Revolution	Won	
2003	Swiss Film Fund	Helvetian Award for Extraordinary Artistic Achievement	—N/a	Won	

=== Honors ===
For his contribution to the motion picture industry, Winkler has a star on the Hollywood Walk of Fame at 6801 Hollywood Boulevard. He was also the recipient of the 2017 Producers Guild of America's David O. Selznick Achievement Award for his work in motion pictures and was awarded the Commandeur des Arts et Lettres by France.
