= List of previous General Hospital cast members =

General Hospital is a long-running American television serial drama, airing on ABC. Created by Frank and Doris Hursley, the series premiered on April 1, 1963. Former cast member Rachel Ames was previously the series' longest-running cast member, portraying Audrey Hardy from 1964 to 2007, and making guest appearances in 2009 and 2013, the latter for the series' fiftieth anniversary. Ames made a special appearance on October 30, 2015. Anthony Geary, who has portrayed Luke Spencer, was the fourth longest-running cast member, having joined General Hospital in November 1978. Geary made his last appearance on May 4, 2017. This is a list of previous cast members.

== Previous cast members ==
Previous cast members
| Actor | Character | Duration |
|---|---|---|
| Cosette Abinante | Scout Cain | 2022–2026 |
| Julie Adams | Denise Wilton | 1969 |
| Marla Adams | Mildred Deal | 1963 |
| R. J. Adams | Frank | 1980–1983 |
| Robert Adamson | Michael Corinthos | 2022, 2024 |
| Lexi Ainsworth | Kristina Davis | 2009–2011, 2015–2023 |
| Crispin Alapag | Heavy | 2014–15 |
| Christian Alexander | Kiefer Bauer | 2009–10 |
| Denise Alexander | Lesley Webber | 1973–84, 1996–2009, 2013, 2017, 2019, 2021 |
| Kristen Alderson | Starr Manning | 2012–13 |
| Kristen Alderson | Kiki Jerome | 2013–15 |
| Aki Aleong | Mr. Wu | 1985 |
| Jed Allan | Edward Quartermaine | 2004–05 |
| Christopher Allen | CPO Hicks | 2013 |
| Tessa Allen | Molly Farrell | 2004 |
| Tessa Allen | Lulu Spencer | 2004–2005 |
| Cristela Alonzo | Natalia Rodriguez | 2015 |
| George Alvarez | Alex Garcia | 1992-99 |
| Rachel Ames | Audrey Hardy | 1964–2007, 2009, 2013, 2015 |
| Adrian Anchondo | Marco Rios | 2025–2026 |
| Richard Dean Anderson | Jeff Webber | 1976–81 |
| Lori and Sevan Andonian | Scout Cain | 2017 |
| Starr Andreeff | Jessica Holmes | 1991–93 |
| Réal Andrews | Marcus Taggert | 1996–2003, 2020–23 |
| Gerald Anthony | Marco Dane | 1992–93 |
| Vinessa Antoine | Jordan Ashford | 2014–18 |
| Ashton Arbab | Dev Cerci | 2019–20 |
| Michelle Argyris | Kendra Lennon | 2019 |
| India Arie | Herself | 2015 |
| Dimitra Arliss | Helena Cassadine | 1996 |
| Tom Arnold | Billy Boggs | 1994 |
| Senait Ashenafi | Keesha Ward | 1994–98 |
| Matthew Ashford | Tom Hardy | 1995–97 |
| Barry Atwater | John Prentice | 1964–67 |
| Jerry Ayres | David Hamilton | 1977–78 |
| Donna Baccala | Gina Dante-Lansing | 1978–79 |
| Philip Baker Hall | Judge Simpson | 1983 |
| Scott Thompson Baker | Colton Shore | 1988–91 |
| Stacey Baldwin | Laura Spencer | 1974–76 |
| Brandon Barash | Johnny Zacchara | 2007–16 |
| Harper Rose Barash | Georgie Spinelli | 2015 |
| Adrienne Barbeau | Suzanne Stanwyck | 2010–11 |
| Roseanne Barr | Jennifer Smith | 1994 |
| Majel Barrett | Bea | 1983 |
| William H. Bassett | Norton Carter | 1983 |
| William H. Bassett | Wolfgang Von Schuler | 1987 |
| Jennifer Bassey | Quinn Danvers | 2017 |
| Susan Batten | Flora Gardens | 2022–23 |
| Nicolas Bechtel | Spencer Cassadine | 2013–20 |
| Kabir Bedi | Rama | 1983 |
| Gregory Beecroft | Jonathan Paget | 1990 |
| Brandon Beemer | Seth | 2005–06 |
| Chris Beetem | Nikolas Cassadine | 2005 |
| Sam Behrens | Jake Meyer | 1983–88 |
| Robert Beitzel | Steven Webber | 1977 |
| Shari Belafonte | Janice Lomax | 2016–17 |
| Felecia Bell | Simone Ravelle Hardy | 1993–96 |
| Joshua Benard | Sonny Corinthos | 2018 |
| Joshua Benard | Adam Wright | 2022–23 |
| Fran Bennett | Flora Johnston | 1983 |
| Meg Bennett | Allegra Montenegro | 2005 |
| Shaun Benson | Steven Webber | 2004–05 |
| Daniel Benzali | Theo Hoffman | 2010–11 |
| John Beradino | Steve Hardy | 1963–96 |
| Milton Berle | Mickey Miller | 1981–82 |
| Julie Marie Berman | Lulu Spencer | 2005–13 |
| Robyn Bernard | Terry Brock | 1984–90 |
| Kevin Bernhardt | Frisco Jones | 1984 |
| Kevin Bernhardt | Kevin O'Connor | 1985–86 |
| Corbin Bernsen | John Durant | 2004–06 |
| Blake Berris | Damian Spinelli | 2017 |
| Jack Betts | Ken Martin | 1963 |
| AnaSofia Bianchi | Charlotte Cassadine | 2023 |
| Casey Biggs | Chad Wainwright | 1990 |
| Casey Biggs | Dr Lasaris | 2018 |
| Patricia Bethune | Nurse Mary Pat | 2018 |
| Loanne Bishop | Rose Kelly | 1980–84 |
| Martin Blaine | Dr. Lyons | 1965 |
| Andrea Bogart | Abby Haver | 2010–11 |
| John Bolger | Prescott Floyd | 2006–12 |
| Steve Bond | Jimmy Lee Holt | 1983–87 |
| Nazanin Boniadi | Leyla Mir | 2007–09 |
| Jay Bontatibus | Andy Capelli | 2002–04 |
| Angel Boris | Angel Sorel Ellis | 2001 |
| Wil Bowers | Ward Administrator | 2002 |
| Wil Bowers | Doctor | 2005 |
| Wil Bowers | Maitre'd | 2013 |
| Wil Bowers | Ferncliff Aide | 2014 |
| Eileen April Boylan | Sage Alcazar | 2003 |
| Chad Brannon | Zander Smith | 2000–04, 2021 |
| Chad Brannon | Aaron | 2009 |
| Jennifer Bransford | Carly Corinthos | 2005 |
| Tamara Braun | Carly Corinthos | 2001–05, 2014 |
| Tamara Braun | Kim Nero | 2017–19 |
| Patricia Breslin | Meg Baldwin | 1965–69 |
| Marc Brett | Zander Smith | 2000 |
| Brianna Brown | Lisa Niles | 2010–11 |
| Kimberly J. Brown | Chloe Jennings | 2021 |
| Kimberlin Brown | Rachel Locke | 1999–2002 |
| Sarah Joy Brown | Carly Corinthos | 1996–2001, 2014 |
| Sarah Joy Brown | Claudia Zacchara | 2008–09 |
| Susan Brown | Gail Adamson Baldwin | 1977–85, 1989–90, 1992–2002, 2004 |
| Tom Brown | Al Weeks | 1963–65, 1970–74 |
| Argentina Brunetti | Filomena Soltini | 1985–88 |
| Breck Bruns | Georgie Jones | 1997–2002 |
| Ian Buchanan | Duke Lavery | 1986–89, 2012–17, 2020 |
| Ian Buchanan | Cesar Faison | 2012 |
| Jensen Buchanan | Melissa Bedford | 2001–02 |
| Rebecca Budig | Hayden Barnes | 2015–17, 2019 |
| Paulina Lule | Valerie Spencer | 2019–20 |
| Brooke Bundy | Diana Taylor | 1977–81 |
| Dan Buran | Linc Brown | 2020, 2022–23 |
| Richard Burgi | Paul Hornsby | 2015–16 |
| Molly Burnett | Maxie Jones | 2016, 2018 |
| Bonnie Burroughs | Gladys Corbin | 2019–23 |
| Lindsay Bushman | Kate Howard | 2011 |
| Nathin Butler | Ewen Keenan | 2011–12 |
| Caitlyn Buton | Hope Manning-Thornhart | 2012 |
| Martha Byrne | Andrea Floyd | 2009 |
| Kurt Caceres | Javier | 2011 |
| Inga Cadranel | Harmony Miller | 2019–23 |
| Erin Cahill | Cassandra | 2009 |
| John Cahill | Bartender | 2016–19 |
| Tony Camp | Scott Baldwin | 1969–72 |
| John Callahan | Leo Russell | 1984–85 |
| Mary Grace Canfield | Lucille March Weeks | 1978 |
| John Capodice | Carmine Cerullo | 1994-95 |
| Gloria Carlin | Charity Gatlin | 1986 |
| Steve Carlson | Gary Lansing | 1977–79 |
| Ryan Carnes | Lucas Jones | 2004–05, 2014–20 |
| Ryan Carnes | Phil Brewer | 2015 |
| Veronica Cartwright | Sibley Gamble | 2019 |
| Paul Carr | Peter Taylor | 1967 |
| Paul Carr | Milton Stanus | 1994 |
| Tia Carrere | Jade Soong Chung | 1985–87 |
| Laura Carrington | Simone Ravelle Hardy | 1987–89 |
| Crystal Carson | Julia Barrett | 1991–93, 1997–98 |
| Sharon Case | Dawn Winthrop | 1989–90 |
| Dylan Cash | Michael Corinthos | 2002–08 |
| Rosalind Cash | Mary Mae Ward | 1994–95 |
| Shaun Cassidy | Dusty Walker | 1987–88 |
| Jonathan Carter | Jason Vining | 1975–1976 |
| Gerald Castillo | Judge Davis Wagner | 1992-94 |
| Teresa Castillo | Sabrina Santiago | 2012–16 |
| Amy Castle | Tara | 2009 |
| Maxwell Caulfield | Apollo | 2026 |
| Lisa Cerasoli | Venus Ardanowski | 1997–99 |
| Erin Chambers | Siobhan McKenna | 2010–11 |
| Brett Chapin | Roger Barstow | 2021 |
| Brett Chapin | District Attorney | 2021 |
| Judith Chapman | Ginny Blake | 1984–86 |
| Leslie Charleson | Monica Quartermaine | 1977–2023 |
| Leslie Charleson | Mary Butler | 2020 |
| Don Chastain | Tom Baldwin | 1967–77 |
| Nicholas Chavez | Spencer Cassadine | 2021–24 |
| Maree Cheatham | Charlene Simpson | 1987–91, 1997 |
| Nick Chinlund | Mickey Diamond | 2014 |
| Paul Chirico | Jason Morgan | 2017 |
| Maksim Chmerkovskiy | Anton Ivanov | 2013 |
| Valentin Chmerkovskiy | Boxer | 2012 |
| Robin Christopher | Abby Mitchell | 1993 |
| Robin Christopher | Skye Chandler | 2001–08, 2010–12 |
| Tyler Christopher | Nikolas Cassadine | 1996–99, 2003–11, 2013–16 |
| Tyler Christopher | Connor Bishop | 2004–05 |
| Christie Clark | Cindy | 1992 |
| Brian Patrick Clarke | Grant Andrews | 1983–85 |
| Brian Patrick Clarke | Grant Putnam | 1983, 1985–88 |
| Don Clarke | Scott Baldwin | 1973–74 |
| Robert Clarke | Roy Lansing | 1963 |
| Robert Clary | French Man | 1985 |
| Tamara Clatterbuck | Tammy Hansen | 2000–01 |
| Scott Clifton | Dillon Quartermaine | 2003–07 |
| Gina Coconato | Alicia | 2015–16 |
| Claire Coffee | Nadine Crowell | 2007–09 |
| Matt Cohen | Griffin Munro | 2016–19 |
| Bradley Cole | Warren Bauer | 2010 |
| Michael Cole | Harlan Barrett | 1991 |
| Booth Colman | Prof. Hector Jerrold | 1983 |
| John Colicos | Mikkos Cassadine | 1981 |
| John Colicos | Petros Cassadine | 1984–85 |
| Marcus Coloma | Nikolas Cassadine | 2019–23 |
| Jason Connery | Sebastian Leeds | 2013 |
| Norma Connolly | Ruby Anderson | 1979–98 |
| Jason Cook | Matt Hunter | 2008–12 |
| Cami Cooper | Nikki Langton | 1992–93 |
| Aneta Corsaut | Jessie Brewer | 1976 |
| Joseph Cortese | Frank Smith | 2015 |
| Ward Costello | Martin Drake | 1983–89 |
| Katie Couric | Kelly Curtis | 2013 |
| Christopher Cousins | Warren Kirk | 2020 |
| Nikki Cox | Gina Cates | 1993–95 |
| Patrick Cox | Rupert Watson | 2018 |
| Josh Coxx | Brendan Byrne | 2020, 2022 |
| Bryan Craig | Morgan Corinthos | 2013–16, 2018, 2024 |
| Gianna Marie Crane | Lila Rae Alcazar | 2006–08 |
| Pat Crowley | Mary Scanlon | 1997 |
| Denise Crosby | Carolyn Webber | 2022–23 |
| Jason Culp | Julian Jerome | 1988–90 |
| Daniel Cummings | Taylor Wallace | 2010–11 |
| Jon Cypher | Max Van Stadt | 1981 |
| Augusta Dabney | Caroline Chandler Baldwin | 1975–76 |
| Tyne Daly | Caroline Beale | 1968 |
| Stuart Damon | Alan Quartermaine | 1977–2008, 2011–13 |
| Tiffany Daniels | Jordan Ashford | 2021 |
| Shell Danielson | Dominique Baldwin | 1991–93 |
| Henry Darrow | Ambassador Tabris | 1982 |
| Henry Darrow | DVX-backed Colonel | 1987 |
| Jason David | Aiden Spencer | 2012–13, 2015–21 |
| Lane Davies | Cameron Lewis | 2002–04 |
| Kristin Davis | Betsy Chilson | 1991 |
| Sammy Davis, Jr. | Eddie Phillips | 1983 |
| Todd Davis | Bryan Phillips | 1978–87 |
| Bruce Davison | Wilhelm VonSchlagel | 2010 |
| Davey Davison | Diana Taylor | 1977 |
| Trent Dawson | Huxley Lynch | 2016–17 |
| Nathan Dean | Ethan Lovett | 2009–13, 2015, 2020, 2026 |
| Enzo De Angelis | Aiden Spencer | 2021–2024 |
| Celesta DeAstis | Avery Corinthos | 2018 |
| Celesta DeAstis | Francesca Cavallo | 2018 |
| Diane Delano | Margarethe | 2016 |
| Michael Delano | Mark Dante | 1976 |
| Isaiah Dell | Leo Falconeri | 2022 |
| Kassie DePaiva | Blair Cramer | 2012, 2023 |
| James DePaiva | David Bensch | 2017–18 |
| Robb Derringer | Kyle Sloane | 2014–15 |
| Jimmy Deshler | Rafe Kovich | 2013–14 |
| William deVry | Julian Jerome | 2013–20 |
| Stephanie Dicker | Gina Cates | 1996–97 |
| Eileen Dietz | Sarah Abbott | 1981–83 |
| Susan Diol | Alexis Davis | 2001–2002 |
| Susan Diol | Clara | 2023 |
| Jeff Donnell | Stella Fields | 1979–88 |
| Jack Donner | Alfred | 2006–2010 |
| Tony Dow | Ross Jeanelle | 1975 |
| Lieux Dressler | Alice Grant | 1978–1983 |
| Chad Duell | Michael Corinthos | 2010–2025 |
| Josh Duhon | Logan Hayes | 2007–2008 |
| Bryce Durfee | Vaughn | 2025–2026 |
| Linda Dona | Nancy Eckert | 1991 |
| Michael Easton | John McBain | 2012–2013 |
| Michael Easton | Stephen Clay | 2013 |
| Michael Easton | Silas Clay | 2013–2015 |
| Michael Easton | Hamilton Finn | 2016–2024 |
| Ted Eccles | Bobby Chandler Baldwin | 1975–1976 |
| Sonya Eddy | Epiphany Johnson | 2006–2022 |
| Hilary Edson | Tania Jones | 1984–1987 |
| Evan Ellingson | Young Luke Spencer | 2001 |
| Ross Elliott | Lee Baldwin | 1963–65 |
| Saidah Arrika Ekulona | Janice Lomax | 2012–13, 2015 |
| Gideon Emery | Jasper Jacks | 2008 |
| Kyler and Caleb Ends | James West | 2019 |
| Kyler and Caleb Ends | Wiley Cooper-Jones | 2021 |
| Randall England | Jack Slater | 1984-85 |
| Stephanie Erb | Alexis Davis | 2022 |
| Ethan Erickson | Patrick Drake | 2008 |
| Kristen Erickson | Alexis Davis | 2006 |
| Hayley Erin | Kiki Jerome | 2015–19 |
| Mary Beth Evans | Katherine Bell | 1993–99 |
| Greg Evigan | Jim Harvey | 2017–18 |
| Morgan Fairchild | Sydney Chase | 1996 |
| Morgan Fairchild | Haven de Havilland | 2022–23 |
| Rick Falk | Phil Brewer | 1966 |
| Richard Fancy | Bennie Abrahms | 1997–03 |
| Richard Fancy | Bernie Abrahms | 2006–12 |
| Gene Farber | Richard Klein | 2017 |
| Bianca Ferguson | Claudia Johnston Phillips | 1978–87 |
| Sandra Ferguson | Felicia Jones | 2005 |
| Scarlett Fernandez | Charlotte Cassadine | 2016–2021, 2023–2025 |
| Jessica Ferrarone | Lydia Karenin | 2003 |
| Mitchell Fink | William Eichner | 2014 |
| Gail Fisher | Judge Heller | 1982 |
| Chrissie Fit | Mercedes Juarez | 2007–11 |
| Joe Flanigan | Neil Byrne | 2019–20 |
| Marc Forget | Pascal | 2025–2026 |
| Eliza Frakes | Julie | 2023 |
| Betsy Franco | Betsy Frank | 2010, 2013–14 |
| James Franco | Franco | 2009–12 |
| Margarita Franco | Dolores Santiago | 1994 |
| Liam and Oliver Friedy | Rocco Falconeri | 2014–15 |
| Kelly Frye | Ivy Gatling | 2014–15 |
| Courtney Fulk (Note: From December 18, 2023, to February 1, 2024, Courtney Fulk pinch-hit in the role of Josslyn Jacks for Eden McCoy.) | Josslyn Jacks | 2023–24 |
| John Gabriel | Teddy Holmes | 1972–73 |
| Holly Gagnier | Jennifer Smith | 2015, 2022 |
| Max Gail | Mike Corbin | 2018–21 |
| Patrick Gallagher | Prison guard | 2017 |
| Don Galloway | Buzz Stryker | 1985–1987 |
| Guy Gansert | Geoffrey | 2025 |
| Leif Gantvoort | Carson | 2018 |
| Priscilla Garita | Lupe | 2011 |
| Priscilla Garita | Harmony Miller | 2022 |
| Zachary Garred | Levi Dunkleman | 2014 |
| Drew Garrett | Michael Corinthos | 2009–10 |
| David Gautreaux | Peter Harrell, Sr. | 2014 |
| George Gaynes | Frank Smith | 1980 |
| Anthony Geary | Luke Spencer | 1978–84, 1993–2015, 2017 |
| Anthony Geary | Bill Eckert | 1991–93 |
| Anthony Geary | Cesar Faison | 2014 |
| Anthony Geary | Tim Spencer | 2015 |
| Jason Gerhardt | Cooper Barrett | 2007–08 |
| Jean Glaudé | Waiter | 1967 |
| Jean Glaudé | Committee Member 2 | 1994 |
| Jean Glaudé | Thomas Anderson | 2013 |
| Blake Gibbons | Coleman Ratcliffe | 2002–12, 2014 |
| Nigel Gibbs | Marcus Godfrey | 2018–20 |
| Daniel Goddard | Henry Dalton | 2025 |
| Mark Goddard | Derek Barrington | 1984–86 |
| Gerald Gordon | Mark Dante | 1976–78, 1982–83 |
| Amy Grabow | Rachel Adair | 2005 |
| Juliet Grainger | Lila Quartermaine | 2003–04 |
| Nathanyael Gray | Mason Gatlin | 2022–23 |
| Mary-Pat Green | Nurse Fletcher | 2012 |
| David Greenman | Danny McCall | 2005–06 |
| Michael Gregory | Rick Webber | 1976–78 |
| David Groh | D. L. Brock | 1983–85 |
| Ben Guillory | David Walters | 2013 |
| Jennifer Guthrie | Dawn Winthrop | 1990–91 |
| Joyce Guy | Betty | 2011 |
| Joyce Guy | Phyllis Caulfield | 2020–2023 |
| Ron Hale | Mike Corbin | 1995–10 |
| Carla Hall | Cook II | 2018 |
| Tamron Hall | Herself | 2019 |
| Courtney Halverson | Anna Donely | 2013 |
| Mark Hamill | Kent Murray | 1972–73 |
| George Hamilton | Colonel Sanders | 2018 |
| Kim Hamilton | Tracy Adams | 1968–69 |
| Jennifer Hammon | Karen Wexler | 1997–99 |
| Peter Hansen | Lee Baldwin | 1965–86, 1989–90, 1992–2004 |
| Vanita Harbour | Dara Jensen | 1996–2003 |
| Eden Harker | Georgie Spinelli | 2023 |
| Adam J. Harrington | John Cates | 2024 |
| Glenn Walker Harris, Jr. | Sly Eckert | 1991–95 |
| Steve Richard Harris | Mikkos Cassadine | 2021 |
| Gregory Harrison | Gregory Chase | 2020–24 |
| Lindsay Hartley | Sam McCall | 2020, 2022, 2024 |
| Donald Patrick Harvey | Tom Baker | 2016 |
| Bob Hastings | Burt Ramsey | 1978–86 |
| Andrew Hawkes | Ross Cullum | 2026 |
| Billie Hayes | Agent Brighton O'Reilly | 1981, 1985 |
| Ron Hayes | Phil Brewer | 1967 |
| Patricia Healy | Tammy Hansen | 1998–2000 |
| Gina Hecht | Rachel Lasser | 2015–19 |
| Elizabeth Hendrickson | Margaux Dawson | 2018–19 |
| Briana Nicole Henry | Jordan Ashford | 2018–21 |
| Briana Nicole Henry | 1920 voter | 2020 |
| Kristin Herrera | Lourdes Del Torro | 2004–08 |
| Paige Herschell | Jacinda Bracken | 2025–2026 |
| Brighton Hertford | B.J. Jones | 1986–94, 2024 |
| Jennifer Hetrick | Veronica Wilding Barrett | 1998 |
| Martin Hewitt | Steven Webber | 1979–81 |
| Shelby Hiatt | Jane Harland | 1968–75 |
| Alice Hirson | Mrs Van Gelder | 1982 |
| Evan Hofer | Dex Heller | 2022–24 |
| Kara and Shelby Hoffman | Kristina Davis | 2003 |
| Robert Hogan | Phil Brewer | 1966 |
| Robert Hogan | Burt Marshall | 1973 |
| Gerald Hopkins | A. J. Quartermaine | 1991–92 |
| Leslie Horan | Miranda Jameson | 1996–97 |
| Gavin Houston | Sly Thomas | 2010 |
| Gavin Houston | Zeke Robinson | 2023 |
| Christian Howard | Ethan Lovett | 2026 |
| Roger Howarth | Todd Manning | 2012–13 |
| Roger Howarth | Franco Baldwin | 2013–21 |
| Roger Howarth | Drew Cain | 2019 |
| Roger Howarth | Austin Gatlin-Holt | 2021–23 |
| Tina Huang | Linda Chu | 2013–14 |
| Janet Hubert | Yvonne Godfrey | 2018–20 |
| Craig Huebing | Phil Brewer | 1967 |
| Craig Huebing | Peter Taylor | 1969–79 |
| Van Hughes | Cole Thornhart | 2012 |
| Duncan Hursley | Mechanic Bill | 2014 |
| Rif Hutton | Lenny Caulfield | 2021–22 |
| Julio Iglesias | Himself | 1994 |
| Mele Ihara | Reiko Finn | 2022 |
| Annie Ilonzeh | Maya Ward | 2010–11 |
| John Ingle | Edward Quartermaine | 1993–2004, 2006–12 |
| Steve Inwood | Moreno | Unknown |
| Conor Jackson | Physical Therapist | 2009 |
| Jonathan Jackson | Lucky Spencer | 1993–1999, 2009–2011, 2015, 2024–2025 |
| Titus Jackson | Aiden Spencer | 2011–12 |
| Kevin and Michael Jacobson | Dillon Quartermaine | 1992–93 |
| Donnie Jeffcoat | Craig | 1990 |
| Anne Jeffreys | Amanda Barrington | 1984–2004 |
| Johnny Jensen | Scott Baldwin | 1974–75 |
| Mikey Jerome | Eddie | 2021 |
| Arte Johnson | Finian O'Toole | 1991–92 |
| Sarah Johnson | Josslyn Jacks | 2012–13 |
| Ashley Jones | Parker Forsyth | 2016–17 |
| Asante Jones | Marcus Taggert | 2020–22 |
| Christine Jones | Tracy Quartermaine | 1989 |
| Jamison Jones | William Peavy | 2004–05 |
| Jamison Jones | Brady Bevin | 2016 |
| Jamison Jones | Warren Kirk | 2020 |
| Shirley Jones | Mrs McClain | 2014 |
| Kathryn Joosten | Ida Warren | 2002–03 |
| Bobbi Jordan | Terri Webber | 1976–77 |
| Patrick J Gibbons Jr. | Wyatt Hoover | 2018–19, 2021 |
| Stanley Kamel | Cody McCall | 2003–04 |
| Sean Kanan | A. J. Quartermaine | 1993–97, 2012–14 |
| Holly Kaplan | Monica Quartermaine | 2022 |
| Casey Kasem | Jack Collins | 1982 |
| Lesli Kay | Lois Cerullo | 2004–05 |
| Stephen Kay | Reginald Jennings | 1992–2004 |
| Braiden and Dylan Kazowski | Danny Morgan | 2015–16 |
| Robert Kelker-Kelly | Stavros Cassadine | 2001–03, 2013–14 |
| Jim Kelly | Himself | 1992 |
| Sandy Kenyon | Guard | 2015 |
| Shell Kepler | Amy Vining | 1979–2002 |
| B.B. King | Himself | 1995 |
| Ted King | Luis Alcazar | 2002 |
| Ted King | Lorenzo Alcazar | 2003–07 |
| Nick Kiriazis | Ric Lansing | 2007 |
| Kodi Kitchen | Maggie Wurth | 2011–12 |
| Jeff Kober | Cyrus Renault | 2020–2025 |
| Walter Koenig | Charlie Turner | 1963 |
| Alla Korot | Nurse Darya | 2017 |
| Holiday Mia Kriegel | Molly Lansing | 2023 |
| Jaxon and Jakob Kring | Danny Morgan | 2012–14 |
| Ilene Kristen | Delia Ryan | 2013–15 |
| Michael Blake Kruse | Rory Cabrera | 2022 |
| Peter Kwong | The Psychiatrist | 2004 |
| Mary Laina | Reporter | 2000–02 |
| Sarah Laine | Sarah Webber | 2002 |
| Shayne Lamas | Carly Corinthos | 2003–05 |
| André Landzaat | Tony Cassadine | 1981 |
| Briana Lane | Brook Lynn Ashton | 2020, 2022 |
| Archie Lang | Forbes | 1982 |
| George Lako | Frankie | 2015–16 |
| Chloe Lanier | Pat Spencer | 2015 |
| Chloe Lanier | Nelle Benson | 2016–20, 2022 |
| Georganne LaPiere | Heather Webber | 1976–77 |
| Karleigh Larson | Josslyn Jacks | 2009–12 |
| Ken Lally | Greg | 2002-03 |
| Eva LaRue | Natalia Rogers-Ramirez | 2024–2025 |
| Robert LaSardo | Manny Ruiz | 2005–2006 |
| Robert LaSardo | Mateo Ruiz | 2006–2007 |
| Carol Lawrence | Angela Eckart | 1991–93 |
| Mark Lawson | Dustin Phillips | 2019–20 |
| George Lazenby | Reginald Durban | 1982 |
| Tiana Le | Trina Robinson | 2017–18 |
| Michael Learned | Shirley Smith | 2010 |
| Anna Lee | Lila Quartermaine | 1978–2003 |
| David S. Lee | Winston Rudge | 2016–17, 2020 |
| Andrew T. Lee | Marty Brown | 2006–09 |
| Damien Leeke | Marshall Ashford | 2022 |
| Edie Lehmann | Katherine Delafield | 1988–90 |
| Colby Lemmo | Holly Sutton-Scorpio | 2022 |
| Ella Lentini | Betty Rutherford | 2023 |
| Adrianne León | Brook Lynn Ashton | 2004–06, 2010–11 |
| Lindze Letherman | Georgie Jones | 2002–07, 2010, 2013, 2018 |
| David Lewis | Edward Quartermaine | 1978–93 |
| Judy Lewis | Barbara Vining | 1975–76, 1978 |
| Patrick Scott Lewis | Mr. Thomas | 2024 |
| Patrick Scott Lewis | Ezra Boyle | 2026 |
| Brit Lind | Miss Bixby | 1988 |
| Jen Lilley | Maxie Jones | 2011–2012 |
| Jon Lindstrom | Ryan Chamberlain | 1992–1995, 2018–2023 |
| Jon Lindstrom | Kevin Collins | 1993–2002, 2004, 2013–2026 |
| Natalia Livingston | Emily Quartermaine | 2003–2009, 2013–2014 |
| Natalia Livingston | Rebecca Shaw | 2009 |
| Bradley Lockerman | Casey Rogers | 1990 |
| Bradley Lockerman | Shep Casey | 1990 |
| June Lockhart | Maria | 1991–94 |
| Samantha Logan | Taylor DuBois | 2013 |
| Mitch Longley | Matt Harmon | 1997–99 |
| Eva Longoria | Brenda Barrett Lookalike | 2000 |
| Jacqueline Grace Lopez | unnamed babysitter | 2015–16 |
| Jacqueline Grace Lopez | Blaze | 2022–24 |
| Charles and Ethan Losie | Rocco Falconeri | 2015–16 |
| Jophielle Love | Violet Finn | 2019–24 |
| Christine Lozano | Christi Limg | 2012–18 |
| Florencia Lozano | Téa Delgado | 2012 |
| Henry Lubatti | Danny McCall | 2004 |
| Keye Luke | The Ancient One | 1985 |
| Joey Luthman | Luke Spencer | 2015 |
| Joey Luthman | Bill Eckert | 2015 |
| Stephen Macht | Trevor Lansing | 2007–09 |
| Elizabeth MacRae | Meg Baldwin | 1969–73 |
| Sheila MacRae | Madelyn Richmond | 1991 |
| Martha Madison | Elizabeth Webber | 2011 |
| Christian Malmin | Fred Gray | 2016–17 |
| Rio Mangini | Oscar Nero | 2017 |
| Kate Mansi | Kristina Corinthos-Davis | 2023–2026 |
| Randolph Mantooth | Richard Halifax | 1991–93 |
| Mary Mara | Selma | 2014 |
| Gregory Marcel | Orderly Gordon | 2018 |
| Vanessa Marcil | Brenda Barrett | 1992–98, 2002–03, 2010–11, 2013 |
| Lisa Marie | Jennifer Smith | 1980 |
| Joe Marinelli | Joseph Sorel | 1999-2001 |
| Marcella Markham | Beatrice LeSeur | 1984 |
| Meghan Markle | Jill | 2002 |
| Ronnie Marmo | Ronnie Dimestico | 2009–12 |
| Matt Marraccini | Jesse Beaudry | 2005–06 |
| Jason Marsden | A. J. Quartermaine | 1986–88 |
| Mia Martin | Kristin Bergman | 2002 |
| Ricky Martin | Miguel Morez | 1994–96 |
| A Martinez | Roy DiLucca | 1999–02 |
| Cyndi Martino | Nurse | 2000 |
| John Martinuzzi | Stavros Cassadine | 1983 |
| Joseph Mascolo | Nicholas Van Buren | 1989 |
| Kerwin Mathews | Duncan Stewart | 1972 |
| Lee Mathis | John Hanley | 1995–96 |
| Eddie Matos | Pete Marquez | 2006–07 |
| DeLane Matthews | Janine Matthews | 2001–03 |
| Robin Mattson | Heather Webber | 1980–1983, 2004, 2012–2016 |
| Helena Mattsson | Sasha Gilmore | 2022 |
| Sofia Mattsson | Sasha Gilmore | 2018–2025 |
| Brad Maule | Tony Jones | 1984–2006, 2019 |
| Richard Mawe | Hospital Review Board Chairman | 2015 |
| Frank Maxwell | Dan Rooney | 1978–90 |
| Heather Mazur | Eileen Ashby | 2021–23 |
| Diane McBain | Claire Howard | 1988 |
| Amelie McClain | Charlotte Cassadine | 2021–23 |
| Leigh McCloskey | Damian Smith | 1993–96 |
| Judith McConnell | Augusta McLeod | 1973–75 |
| Patty McCormack | Monica Quartermaine | 2018 |
| Peyton McCormick | Penny | 2013 |
| Grayson McCouch | Kyle Sloane | 2015 |
| Kimberly McCullough | Robin Scorpio | 1985–2000, 2004–18, 2021 |
| Maura McGiveney | Audrey Hardy | 1971 |
| Chris L. McKenna | Jack Brennan | 2025–2026 |
| Beverlee McKinsey | Myrna Slaughter | 1994 |
| Kurt McKinney | Ned Ashton | 1988–91 |
| Amelie McLain | Charlotte Cassadine | 2021–23 |
| Coby Ryan McLaughlin | Shiloh | 2018–19 |
| Emily McLaughlin | Jessie Brewer | 1963–91 |
| Cade McWatt | Cameron Spencer | 2018 |
| Jeffrey Meek | Thomas Dade | 2002 |
| Ron Melendez | Andy Archer | 2007–09 |
| Lilly Melgar | Lily Rivera Corinthos | 1994–96, 2001, 2003 |
| Lilly Melgar | Marcella Montoya | 2003 |
| Bridgit Mendler | Lulu's Dream Daughter | 2006 |
| Dawn Merrick | Samantha Welles | 1985–89 |
| Charles Mesure | Jack Brennan | 2023–2025 |
| Katie Mewes | Bobbie Spencer | 2015 |
| Krys Meyer | TJ Ashford | 2012 |
| Robert Miano | Joe Scully Sr. | 1995 |
| Amanda Michalka | Ashley B | 2004 |
| Sydney Mikayla | Trina Robinson | 2019–22 |
| Allison Miller | Tracy Quartermaine | 2006 |
| Billy Miller | Jake Doe | 2014–15 |
| Billy Miller | Jason Morgan | 2014–17 |
| Billy Miller | Drew Cain | 2017–19 |
| J. Robin Miller | Lydia Karenin | 2003 |
| Mark Miller | Randy Washburn | 1965 |
| Alley Mills | Heather Webber | 2022–24 |
| Donna Mills | Madeline Reeves | 2014–2015, 2018 |
| Melanie Minichino | Kristin Bergman | 2021 |
| Mary Ann Mobley | Jonelle Andrews | 1979 |
| Kelly Monaco | Sam McCall | 2003–24 |
| Kelly Monaco | Alicia Montenegro | 2005 |
| Julie Mond | Lisa Niles | 2009 |
| Anthony Montgomery | Aaron | 2011 |
| Anthony Montgomery | Andre Maddox | 2015–19, 2022 |
| Elizabeth Montgomery | Elizabeth Clarke Brown | 1986; 1991–94 |
| Rebeka Montoya | Delores Padilla | 2011–12 |
| Christian Monzon | Eddie Cabrera | 2012 |
| Lynne Moody | Florence Campbell | 2000–02 |
| Chris Moore | Himself | 1992 |
| Demi Moore | Jackie Templeton | 1982–84 |
| Camilla More | Anna Devane | 1991–92 |
| Debbi Morgan | Ellen Burgess | 1997–98 |
| Lindsey Morgan | Kristina Davis | 2012–13 |
| Ann Morrison | Peggy Nelson | 1971 |
| M'fundo Morrison | Justus Ward | 2003–06 |
| Ronn Moss | Himself | 2014 |
| Oliver Muirhead | Larry Ashton | 2017 |
| Mandy Musgrave | Carol Lockhart | 2019 |
| Manuel Nardi | Jackie | 2006 |
| Guy Nardulli | Pete | 2016 |
| Hugo Napier | Larry Ashton | 1988–89, 1991–92, 2014, 2016 |
| Jaime Ray Newman | Kristina Cassadine | 2001–03 |
| Robert Newman | Prescott Harrell | 1985 |
| Stephen Nichols | Stefan Cassadine | 1996–2003 |
| James Nigbor | Jake Spencer | 2009–11 |
| Leonard Nimoy | Bernie Smith | 1963 |
| Minae Noji | Kelly Lee | 2006–12, 2015–16 |
| Hannah Nordberg | Josslyn Jacks | 2014–15 |
| Jay North | Al Barker | 1981 |
| Noshir Dalal | Raj | 2015, 2019 |
| Mary O'Brien | Heather Webber | 1977–79 |
| Alyshia Ochse | Irina Cassadine | 2011–12 |
| John O'Hurley | Greg Bennett | 1992 |
| Ronan O'Reilly | 2010 | |
| Jonathan Ohye | Dr Andy | 2015–19 |
| Agnes Olech | Larisa | 2017 |
| John Oliver | Z | 2026 |
| Ron Ostrow | Pilot | 1996–2001 |
| Ron Ostrow | Dr Austin | 2008 |
| David Otunga | Himself | 2014 |
| Ryan Paevey | Nathan West | 2013–2018 |
| Ryan Paevey | Cassius Faison (Note: Ryan Paevey was credited as portraying Nathan West since his return in 2025; the reveal of his portrayal of Cassius did not occur until March 2026.) | 2025–2026 |
| Janis Paige | Aunt Iona Huntington | 1980-90 |
| Johnny Palermo | Bus Boy | 2005 |
| Johnny Palermo | Vinnie | 2007 |
| Ken Parham | Fireman Hawkeye | 1998–99 |
| Jeffrey Vincent Parise | Carlos Rivera | 2013–16 |
| Jeffrey Vincent Parise | Joe Rivera | 2016 |
| Palmer and Poe Parker | Scout Cain | 2017–19 |
| Rick Pasqualone | Vincent Marino | 2018 |
| Vincent Pastore | Maximus Giambetti | 2008 |
| Alina Patra | Susan Hornsby | 2016 |
| Ciera Payton | Grace | 2017 |
| Lindsey Pearlman | Margaret McMorris | 2020 |
| Andrea Pearson | Gia Campbell | 2002–03 |
| Nia Peeples | Carla Escobar | 1983–84 |
| Thaao Penghlis | Victor Cassadine | 1981, 2014 |
| George Pennacchio | George | 2013–18 |
| Christopher Pennock | Mitch Williams | 1979–80 |
| Melissa Peterman | Mel | 2015 |
| Beth Peters | Agnes Whitaker | 1982-84 |
| Joseph C. Phillips | Justus Ward | 1994–98 |
| Jay Pickett | Lorenzo Alcazar | 2006 |
| Jay Pickett | David Harper | 2007–08 |
| Cara Pifko | Louise Addison | 2009 |
| Edward Platt | Dr Miller | 1963 |
| Avery Kristen Pohl | Esme Prince | 2021–2025 |
| Larry Poindexter | Asher Thomas | 2005 |
| Ely Pouget | Jeannette Marino | 2018 |
| Brittney Powell | Summer Halloway | 2002–03 |
| Haley Pullos | Molly Lansing | 2009–23 |
| Susan Pratt | Anne Logan | 1978–82 |
| Erin Hershey Presley | Alison Barrington | 2013 |
| Paolo Presta | Doug Mancino | 2005 |
| Cynthia Preston | Faith Rosco | 2002–05 |
| Nicholas Pryor | Victor Collins | 1997–2003 |
| Teddy Quinn | Scott Baldwin | 1966 |
| Alan Rachins | Judge James Horowitz | 2016-18 |
| Brooke Radding | Brook Lynn Ashton | 1996–2001 |
| Patsy Rahn | Monica Quartermaine | 1976–77 |
| Marisa Ramirez | Gia Campbell | 2000–02 |
| Trish Ramish | Herself | 2011, 2019 |
| Gail Ramsey | Susan Moore | 1978–83 |
| Wes Ramsey | Peter August | 2017–2022, 2026 |
| Lak Rana | Lak Rashi | 2013 |
| Lou Rawls | Himself | 1995 |
| Jen Ray | Chelsea Lambas | 2019 |
| James Read | Gregory Chase | 2018 |
| Scott Reeves | Steven Webber | 2009–13, 2024 |
| Caitlin Reilly | Anna Donely | 2021 |
| John Reilly | Sean Donely | 1984–95, 2013 |
| Peter Renaday | John Jacks | 1996–2003, 2012 |
| Robyn Richards | Maxie Jones | 1993–2004 |
| Cheryl Richardson | Jenny Eckert | 1991–94, 1996 |
| Tequan Richmond | TJ Ashford | 2012–18 |
| Matt Riedy | Matthew Mayes | 2016 |
| Tristan Riggs | Aiden Spencer | 2024 |
| Robin Riker | Naomi Dreyfus | 2016 |
| Zakary Risinger | Danny Morgan | 2021 |
| Renie Rivas | Gallery assistant | 2017 |
| Alexia Robinson | Meg Lawson | 1990–94 |
| Chris Robinson | Rick Webber | 1978–86, 2002, 2013 |
| Sebastian Roché | Jerry Jacks | 2007–10, 2012–15 |
| Michael Rodrick | Seth Baker | 2016 |
| Kali Rodriguez | Kristina Davis | 2005–2008 |
| Tristan Rogers | Robert Scorpio | 1980–1992, 1995, 2006, 2008, 2012–2016, 2018–2025 |
| Willa Rose | Nelle Benson | 2020 |
| Ricco Ross | Sterling Robinson | 2023 |
| Paul Rosilli | David Grey | 1981–82 |
| Caden and Corben Rothweiler | Danny Morgan | 2014–15 |
| Curtis & James Rufca | James West | 2019 |
| Tim Russ | Dr Trent | 2006–07 |
| Richard Rust | James Vining | 1975 |
| James Ryan | Ethan Lovett | 2023 |
| Mitchell Ryan | Frank Smith | 1993–94 |
| Roz Ryan | Esther Love | 2012 |
| Emme Rylan | Lulu Spencer | 2013–20 |
| Antonio Sabàto Jr. | Jagger Cates | 1992–95 |
| Dahlia Salem | Claire Walsh | 2010–11 |
| Emma Samms | Holly Sutton-Scorpio | 1982–1985, 1992–1993, 2006, 2009, 2012–2013, 2015, 2020, 2022–2024 |
| Emma Samms | Paloma Stuart | 1992–1993 |
| David Sampen | Photographer/ Port Charles Resident | 2014–19 |
| Brytni Sarpy | Valerie Spencer | 2015–19 |
| Richard Sarradet | Howard Lansing | 1978–81 |
| Paul Satterfield | Paul Hornsby | 1991–94 |
| Michael Saucedo | Juan Santiago | 1999–01, 2013–14 |
| Paul Savoir | Tom Baldwin | 1967–72 |
| Owen Saxon | Carson's Henchman | 2018 |
| Ava and Grace Scarola | Avery Corinthos | 2014–2025 |
| Travis Schuldt | Dr. Zajac | 2017 |
| Brad Schmidt | Brando Corbin | 2022 |
| Brad Schmidt | Book | 2022–23 |
| Coltin Scott | Nikolas Cassadine | 1999–03 |
| Ignacio Serricchio | Diego Alcazar | 2004–06, 2008 |
| Aaron Seville | Bradley Ward | 1994–96 |
| Paula Shaw | Records Nurse | 1981 |
| Paula Shaw | O.R. Nursing Supervisor | 1982 |
| Monti Sharp | Justus Ward | 1998–99 |
| Charles Shaughnessy | Alistair Durban | 1984 |
| Charles Shaughnessy | Victor Cassadine | 2021–23 |
| Cari Shayne | Karen Wexler | 1992–94 |
| Doug Sheehan | Joe Kelly | 1979–82 |
| Blake Sheldon | Hale Garrett | 2016 |
| Graham Shiels | Cody Paul | 2007–08 |
| James Sikking | James Hobart | 1973–76 |
| Londyn Silzer | Bailey | 2017 |
| Richard Simmons | Himself | 1979–82, 2013 |
| Peggy Sinclair | Sister Ellen Chapman | 1972–73 |
| Brooklyn Rae Silzer | Emma Drake | 2011–18, 2020 |
| Jennifer Sky | Sarah Webber | 1997–98 |
| Erika Slezak | Ronnie Bard | 2025 |
| Tava Smiley | Chloe Morgan | 1999–2001 |
| Brooke Anne Smith | Molly Lansing | 2023 |
| Emma and Sarah Smith | Kristina Davis | 2003–05 |
| Hillary B. Smith | Nora Buchanan | 2017, 2019 |
| Justin Smith | Holt | 2016 |
| Rena Sofer | Lois Cerullo | 1993–1997, 2023–2025 |
| Rick Springfield | Noah Drake | 1981–83, 2005–08, 2012–13 |
| Rick Springfield | Eli Love | 2007–08 |
| Rick Springfield | Himself | 2013 |
| Nick Stabile | Nikolas Cassadine | 2016 |
| Kelly Stables | Bobbie Spencer | 2003 |
| Michelle Stafford | Nina Reeves | 2014–19 |
| John Stamos | Blackie Parrish | 1982–84 |
| Darby Stanchfield | Amelia Joffe | 2007 |
| Jonathan Stanley | Billy Pryce | 2019 |
| Anthony Starke | Kevin Collins | 2015 |
| Valerie Starrett | Diana Taylor | 1969–77 |
| Richard Steinmetz | Joe Scully, Jr. | 2012 |
| Stella Stevens | Jake | 1996-1999 |
| Danica Stewart | Maxie Jones | 2002 |
| Garren Stitt | Oscar Nero | 2017–2019 |
| Julian Stone | Jerry Jacks | 1998–1999 |
| Kirsten Storms | Maxie Jones | 2005–2026 |
| Kirsten Storms | B.J. Jones | 2009 |
| Deborah Strang | Betsy Frank | 2017–2018 |
| Sally Struthers | Jennifer Smith | 2002 |
| Anna Stuart | Gina Dante-Lansing | 1977–78 |
| Gloria Stuart | Catherine Flynn | 2002–03 |
| Katie Stuart | Sage Alcazar | 2003–04 |
| Coleen Sullivan | Herself | 2018 |
| Kelly Sullivan | Connie Falconeri | 2011–14 |
| Liam Sullivan | Roy Lansing | 1963–64 |
| Liam Sullivan | Dr Wallace | 1988 |
| Michael Sutton | Stone Cates | 1993–95, 2010, 2017 |
| Gable Swanlund | Alexis Davis | 2021 |
| George Takei | Mr Diem | 1985 |
| Amber Tamblyn | Emily Quartermaine | 1995–01 |
| Philip Tanzini | Jeremy Logan | 1978–82 |
| Barbara Tarbuck | Jane Jacks | 1996–2010 |
| Milt Tarver | Justice of the Peace | 2000 |
| Elizabeth Taylor | Helena Cassadine | 1981 |
| Jana Taylor | Angie Costello-Weeks | 1963–65, 1993 |
| Roy Thinnes | Phil Brewer | 1963–66 |
| Jason Thompson | Patrick Drake | 2005–16 |
| Jason Thompson | Steve Hardy | 2015 |
| Pam Tillis | Herself | 1998 |
| Marcus Toji | Brad Cooper | 2013 |
| Constance Towers | Helena Cassadine | 1997–2007, 2009–17, 2019–20, 2022–23 |
| Daniel J. Travanti | Spence Andrews | 1979 |
| Les Tremayne | Edward Quartermaine | 1987–88 |
| Craig Tsuyumine | Dr Hillier | 2001 |
| Craig Tsuyumine | Clerk | 2017 |
| Jessica Tuck | Cassandra Pierce | 2017–19 |
| Janine Turner | Laura Templeton | 1982–83 |
| Michael Tylo | Charlie Prince | 1989 |
| Daya Vaidya | Martina Morales | 2017 |
| Erik Valdez | Trey Mitchell | 2012–13 |
| Chris Van Etten | Chet Driscoll | 2017–19, 2022 |
| Greg Vaughan | Lucky Spencer | 2003–09 |
| Reginald VelJohnson | Reverend Winston Love | 2012 |
| Nick Viall | Himself | 2018 |
| Meredith Vieira | Bree Flanders | 2003, 2012 |
| Anthony Vitale | Aldo | 2015–16 |
| Danielle von Zerneck | Louisa "Lou" Swenson | 1983–84 |
| Lisa Vultaggio | Hannah Scott | 1999–2001 |
| Johnny Wactor | Brando Corbin | 2020–22 |
| Catherine Wadkins | Mary Bishop | 2004 |
| Chuck Wagner | Randall Thompson | 1981-1982 |
| Jack Wagner | Frisco Jones | 1984–91, 1994–95, 2013 |
| Tonja Walker | Olivia St. John | 1988–90, 2017 |
| Jamil Walker Smith | Jeffrey Scribner | 2014 |
| Braden Walkes | Cameron Spencer | 2006–2012 |
| Lucille Wall | Lucille Weeks | 1963–76, 1982 |
| David Wallace | Tom Hardy | 1987–93 |
| Dee Wallace | Pat Spencer | 2015 |
| Sydney Walsh | Maggie | 2021 |
| Kelsey Wang | Daisy Kwan | 2018–20 |
| Burt Ward | Himself | 1991–94 |
| Megan Ward | Kate Howard | 2007–10, 2018, 2020 |
| Cari Ann Warder | Amy Vining | 1975 |
| Billy Warlock | A. J. Quartermaine | 1997–2003, 2005 |
| Lee Warrick | Mary Ellen Dante | 1976–77 |
| Tuc Watkins | Pierce Dorman | 1996–97 |
| Robert Palmer Watkins | Dillon Quartermaine | 2015–17 |
| Michael Watson | Decker Moss | 1989–91 |
| Kristina Wayborn | Greta Ingstorm | 1987–88 |
| TK Weaver | Danny Morgan | 2016–19 |
| Bruce Weitz | Anthony Zacchara | 2007–12 |
| Elmarie Wendel | Peg | 2008 |
| Annie Wersching | Amelia Joffe | 2007 |
| Adam West | Himself | 1991–94 |
| Martin West | Phil Brewer | 1967–75 |
| Justin Whalin | A. J. Quartermaine | 1989 |
| James Wheaton | Stahlman | 1978 |
| Johnny Whitaker | Scott Baldwin | 1965–66 |
| Betty White | Herself | 1991–94 |
| Dan White | Elijah Crowe | 2021 |
| Walt Willey | Jackson Montgomery | 2023 |
| Barry Williams | Hannibal | 1984 |
| Bergen Williams | Alice Gunderson | 2001–15 |
| Billy Dee Williams | Toussaint Dubois | 2009 |
| Stephanie Williams | Simone Ravelle Hardy | 1990–93 |
| Bree Williamson | Claudette Beaulieu | 2016–17 |
| Alicia Leigh Willis | Courtney Matthews | 2001–06, 2015, 2020 |
| Chandra Wilson | Tina Estrada | 2014 |
| Chandra Wilson | Linda Massey | 2018 |
| Chandra Wilson | Sydney Val Jean | 2019, 2023 |
| Emily Wilson | Ellie Trout | 2012–16, 2022 |
| Guy Wilson | Luke Spencer | 2006 |
| Guy Wilson | Lucky Spencer | 2025 |
| Marie Wilson | Karen Wexler | 1999–2003 |
| Jason Wingreen | Judge Mattson | 1991 |
| Time Winters | Arthur Cabot | 2019 |
| Sherilyn Wolter | Celia Quartermaine | 1983–86 |
| Lesley Woods | Edna Hadley | 1977–78, 1980 |
| Kari Wührer | Reese Marshall | 2005 |
| Sharon Wyatt | Tiffany Donely | 1981–84, 1986–95, 2021 |
| Meg Wyllie | Doris Roach | 1975 |
| Meg Wyllie | Hester Frumpkin | 1982 |
| Meg Wyllie | Lila Quartermaine | 1994 |
| Anne Wyndham | Caroline Murray | 1972–75 |
| Gwendoline Yeo | Kelly Lee | 2006 |
| Jacob Young | Lucky Spencer | 2000–03 |
| Tony Young | Herb Clark | 1963 |
| William Allen Young | David Walters | 2014–15, 2019−20 |
| Gregory Zarian | Julius | 2007–08 |
| Maysoon Zayid | Zahra Amir | 2019–20 |
| Joe Zee | Himself | 2016 |
| Jacklyn Zeman | Bobbie Spencer | 1977–2010, 2013–23 |

== See also ==
- General Hospital
- List of General Hospital cast members
- List of General Hospital characters
