= List of Port Charles cast members =

This is a list of the cast members of Port Charles

This is a list of cast members from the former ABC daytime soap opera, Port Charles.

== Cast ==
Actor	Character	Duration
Edward Albert	Bennett Devlin	1997–98
Sarah Aldrich	Courtney Kanelos	1998–2000
Jed Allan	Ed Grant	2001–03
George Alvarez	Alex Garcia	1997–99
Rachel Ames	Audrey Hardy	1997–99
Matt Amshey	Michael Pomerantz	1999–2000
Opal Anchel	Arianna Shapour	2001
Izzy Assencos	Jamal Woods	2002
Maurice Benard	Sonny Corinthos	2000
Joy Bisco	Casey Leong	2002–03
Joy Bisco	Marissa Leong	2002–03
Jay Bontatibus	Andy Capelli	2001–02
Vanessa Branch	Paige Smith	2002
Vanessa Branch	Rebecca Barrington	2002
Kimberlin Brown	Rachel Locke	1999–2002
Susan Brown	Gail Baldwin	1997–2003
Ian Buchanan	Joshua Temple	2002–03
Leslie Charleson	Monica Quartermaine	1997–2001
Maree Cheatham	Charlene Simpson	1999
Patricia Crowley	Nurse Mary Scanlon Collins	1997–2003
Stuart Damon	Alan Quartermaine	1997–2001
Shell Danielson	Dominique Stanton	1997–99
Linda Dano	Rae Cummings	2000
Tamara Davies	Amy Harris	2002
William deVry	Tim Dolan	2002
Michael Dietz	Joe Scanlon	1997–99
Michael Easton	Caleb Morley	2001–03
Michael Easton	Michael Morley	2001
Michael Easton	Stephen Clay	2002–03
Kiko Ellsworth	Jamal Woods	2000–03
Stephanie Erb	Camille Owens	2000
Mary Beth Evans	Katherine Bell	1997–99
Tori Falcon	Alison Hebrart	2003
David Gail	Joe Scanlon	1999–2000
Brian Gaskill	Rafe Kovich	2001–03
Anthony Geary	Luke Spencer	1998
Nancy Lee Grahn	Alexis Davis	2000
Renee Griffin	Danielle Ashley	1997
Lisa Ann Hadley	Julie Devlin	1997–2001
Ron Hale	Mike Corbin	1997–2000
Jennifer Hammon	Karen Wexler	1997–99
Peter Hansen	Lee Baldwin	1997–2002
Susan Haskell	Granya Thornhart	2001
Lynn Herring	Lucy Coe	1997–2003
Rib Hillis	Jake Marshak	1997–98
David Holcomb	Greg Cooper	1997–2000
Anastasia Horne	Lark Madison-Scanlon	1997–99
Anders Hove	Cesar Faison	2000
Colton James	Neil Kanelos	1998–2000
Thorsten Kaye	Ian Thornhart	2000–03
Kent Masters King	Imani	2003
Jon Lindstrom	Kevin Collins	1997–2003
Jon Lindstrom	Ryan Chamberlain	1998
Mitch Longley	Matt Harmon	1997–2000
Eddie Matos	Ricky Garza	2001–03
Brad Maule	Tony Jones	1997, 1999–2000
Kimberly McCullough	Robin Scorpio	1998
Alex Mendoza	Joe Scanlon	2000–02
Kelly Monaco	Livvie Locke	2000–03
Kelly Monaco	Tess Ramsey	2002–03
Debbi Morgan	Ellen Burgess	1997–98
Laura Nevell	Brenda Madison	2002–03
Stephen Nichols	Stefan Cassadine	1997
Nolan North	Chris Ramsey	1997–2003
Wayne Northrop	Rex Stanton	1997–98
Ion Overman	Gabriela Garza	2000–02
Kay Panabaker	Sara	2002
Jay Pickett	Frank Scanlon	1997–2003
Julie Pinson	Eve Lambert	1997–2002
Brian Presley	Jack Ramsey	2000–03
Erin Hershey Presley	Alison Barrington	2000–03
Nicholas Pryor	Victor Collins	1997–2003
Marie-Alise Recasner	Ellen Burgess	1998–99
Carly Schroeder	Serena Baldwin	1997–2003
Jean Bruce Scott	Colleen Russo	2000–03
Kin Shriner	Scott Baldwin	1997–2003
Sally Spaide	Doreen Luccio	2002–03
Rebecca Staab	Elizabeth Barrington	2002–03
Shannon Sturges	Kate Reynolds	2002–03
Rodney Van Johnson	Sebastian Dupree	1999
Eddie Velez	Alex Garcia	1999–2001
Marie Wilson	Karen Wexler	1999–2003
John J. York	Mac Scorpio	1997–2001

== See also ==
- List of General Hospital cast members
- List of Port Charles characters
