= Ashley Jones =

American actress

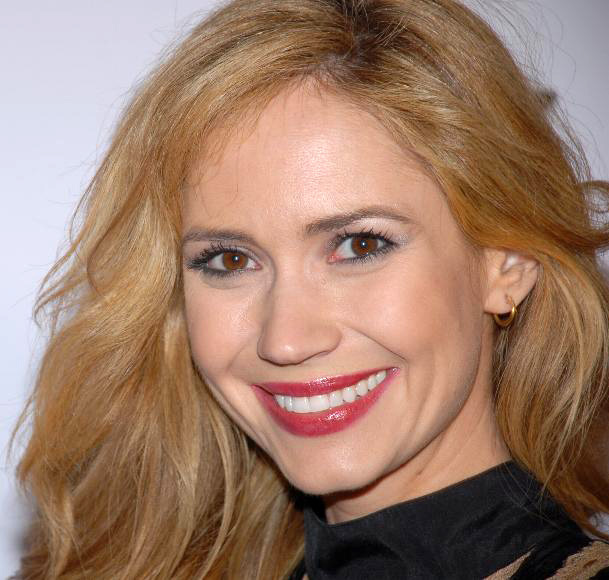
- Jones in 2007
- Born: Ashley Aubra Jones; Memphis, Tennessee, U.S.
- Occupation: Actress
- Years active: 1981–present
- Spouses: Noah Nelson (m. 2002; div. 2009) Joel Henricks (m. 2016; div. 2019)
- Children: 1
- Relatives: Craig T. Nelson (former-father-in-law)

Ashley Aubra Jones is an American actress. She is known for her roles in soap operas as Megan Dennison on The Young and the Restless and as Bridget Forrester on The Bold and the Beautiful. She also portrayed the recurring role as Daphne in the second season of the HBO drama series True Blood. From 2016 to 2017, Jones played the recurring role of Parker Forsyth on General Hospital.

== Early life ==
Jones was born in Memphis, Tennessee. Shawn Jones, her father, is a minister. The family lived in Tennessee for five years before her father took a job preaching in Texas. Jones has one brother named Zach and one sister named Toni, named after their aunt who saved their mother's life by donating blood. At the age of five, she filmed her first commercial. At the age of nine, Jones starred in several theater productions in the Actors Theatre of Houston including The Women, Ah, Wilderness!, and Neil Simon's Brighton Beach Memoirs. At the age of 12, she was in The Chalk Garden by Enid Bagnold.

== Career ==
Jones rose to fame on the long-running CBS soap opera The Young and the Restless, playing Megan Dennison from 1997 to 2000, and again in 2001. She received two Daytime Emmy Award nominations for her role on The Young and the Restless. She played Dr. Bridget Forrester on The Bold and the Beautiful from December 2004 to February 2012 and again in 2013. She has made brief return appearances several times since 2013, including numerous times in 2025. In 2024, she was nominated for a Daytime Emmy for her role as Bridget, her second nomination for the role and fourth overall in her career.

Jones starred as Daphne on the second season of HBO's True Blood in 2009. Jones also has starred in the number of Lifetime movies, like A Teacher's Crime (2008), Dead At 17 (2008), Secrets from Her Past (2011), House (2011), A Sister's Revenge (2013), and The Secret Sex Life of a Single Mom (2014) and Saving My Daughter (2021). In late January 2016, Jones was confirmed to be cast as Parker Forsyth on General Hospital.

In 2023, Jones directed the Lifetime movie The Perfect In-Laws, which premiered that November. She starred in an independent film In Flight with co-stars Tiffany Smith and Cristo Fernandez that was released Nov. 8, 2024. In September 2023, she joined Bold and the Beautiful co-star Katherine Kelly Lang as a model for Impero Couture, a fashion company based in Naples, Italy. Jones and Lang are the stars of the line's 2024 campaign. In July 2024, Jones and Lang also became the main models for Caprese, an Italian swimwear company.

Jones was executive producer and star of a Lifetime movie The Girl Who Survived: The Alina Thompson Story, which premiered in September 2025. The movie tells the story of a teenage model in Los Angeles who survived an encounter with a serial killer in the 1980s. Jones led the project from scratch and starred on screen as Thompson's mother.

In April 2026, Jones revealed she will have a recurring role on the CBS soap Beyond the Gates as an unnamed character. That character was revealed to be Heather, the sister of Joey Armstrong.

== Personal life ==
Jones was married to actor Noah Nelson, the son of actor Craig T. Nelson, from August 17, 2002, to May 2009. She previously dated former B&B co-star Jack Wagner.

On February 1, 2016, Jones married IT infrastructure manager Joel Henricks in a small courthouse wedding. In March 2016, it was announced that Jones and Henricks were expecting a son together, who was born in May 2016. Henricks already has a son from a previous relationship. On September 6, 2019, Jones filed for divorce from Henricks. They share joint custody of their minor child.

== Filmography ==
=== Film ===
Year	Title	Role	Notes
2000	The King's Guard	Princess Gwendolyn	Direct-to-video film
2001	Devil's Prey	Susan	Direct-to-video film
2003	Old School	Caterer	
2005	Extreme Dating	Amanda	
2012	Gabe the Cupid Dog	Lana	
2013	Angel's Perch	Ginny	
2015	The Wedding Ringer	Babs Fremont	
2017	12 Days of Giving	Pamela	
2024	In Flight	Ellen	
2025	Blue Eyed Girl	Abby	

=== Television ===
Year	Title	Role	Notes
1993	Dr. Quinn, Medicine Woman	Ingrid	Episode: "Epidemic"
1993	The Fire Next Time	Linnie Morgan	Miniseries
1995	She Fought Alone	Susan	Television film
1996	Our Son, the Matchmaker	Young Winona	Television film
1997–2001	The Young and the Restless	Megan Dennison	Regular role
2000	Strong Medicine	Shelly Lane	Episode: "Blessed Events"
2001	The District	Dana Rayburn	Episode: "Lost and Found"
2004	Without a Trace	Trista Bowden	Episode: "Risen"
2004–2013, 2015–2016, 2018, 2020–2025	The Bold and the Beautiful	Bridget Forrester	Contract role: December 2004 – November 2010; Recurring role: October 2011 to February 2012; Guest role: May 2013; August 2015; February 2016; August, September, December, 2018; March, November 2020; March 2021; March, April, June 2022; December 2023; September, December 2024; April, July, August, October 2025
2007	CSI: NY	Kennedy Gable	Episode: "Heart of Glass"
2008	A Teacher's Crime	Carrie Ryans	Television film
2008	Dead at 17	Becca	Television film
2009	True Blood	Daphne Landry	Recurring role (season 2), 8 episodes
2009	The Mentalist	Sandrine Gerber	Episode: "Black Gold and Red Blood"
2011	House	Diane	Episode: "Recession Proof"
2011	Secrets from Her Past	Kate Collins / Stephanie Wicks	Television film
2012	Outlaw Country	Lianne	Television film
2012	Bones	Dr. Kathy / Cherie Redfern	Episode: "The Suit on the Set"
2012	Drop Dead Diva	Sheila Reese	Episode: "Pick's & Pakes"
2012	90210	Amanda Barnard	3 episodes
2013	A Sister's Revenge	Catherine Miller	Television film
2014	The Secret Sex Life of a Single Mom	Delaine	Television film
2014	Criminal Minds	Kate Hoffer	Episode: "Gabby"
2015	CSI: Cyber	Arianna Peterson	Episode: "URL, Interrupted"
2016–2017	General Hospital	Parker Forsyth	Recurring role
2017	Major Crimes	Tammy Bechtel	Episodes: "By Any Means: Part 2", "By Any Means: Part 4"
2017	More Than Enough	Sandra	Television film
2017	12 Days of Giving	Pamela	Television film
2017	You Killed My Mother	Miriam Preston	Television film
2019	Homekilling Queen	Connie Manning	Television film
2021	The Rookie	Kelsey Adams	Episode: "Lockdown"
2021	The Resident	Diana Anza	Episode: "The Proof Is in The Pudding"
2021	Saving My Daughter	Mandy	Television film; also known as Double Kidnapped
2022	For All Mankind	Yvonne	Episode: "Polaris"
2023	So Help Me Todd	Kathleen Baylis	Episode: "The Devil You Know"
2025	The Girl Who Survived: The Alina Thompson Story	Helen Thompson	Television film
2026	Beyond the Gates	Heather Armstrong	

== Awards and nominations ==
Year	Association	Category	Title of work	Result	Ref.
1999	Daytime Emmy Award	Outstanding Younger Actress in a Drama Series	The Young and the Restless	Nominated	
2000	Daytime Emmy Award	Outstanding Younger Actress in a Drama Series	The Young and the Restless	Nominated	
2005	Daytime Emmy Award	Most Irresistible Combination (shared with Jack Wagner)	The Bold and the Beautiful	Nominated	
2024	Daytime Emmy Award	Outstanding Guest Performer in a Drama Series	The Bold and the Beautiful	Nominated	
