= Kelly Sullivan (actress) =

American actress

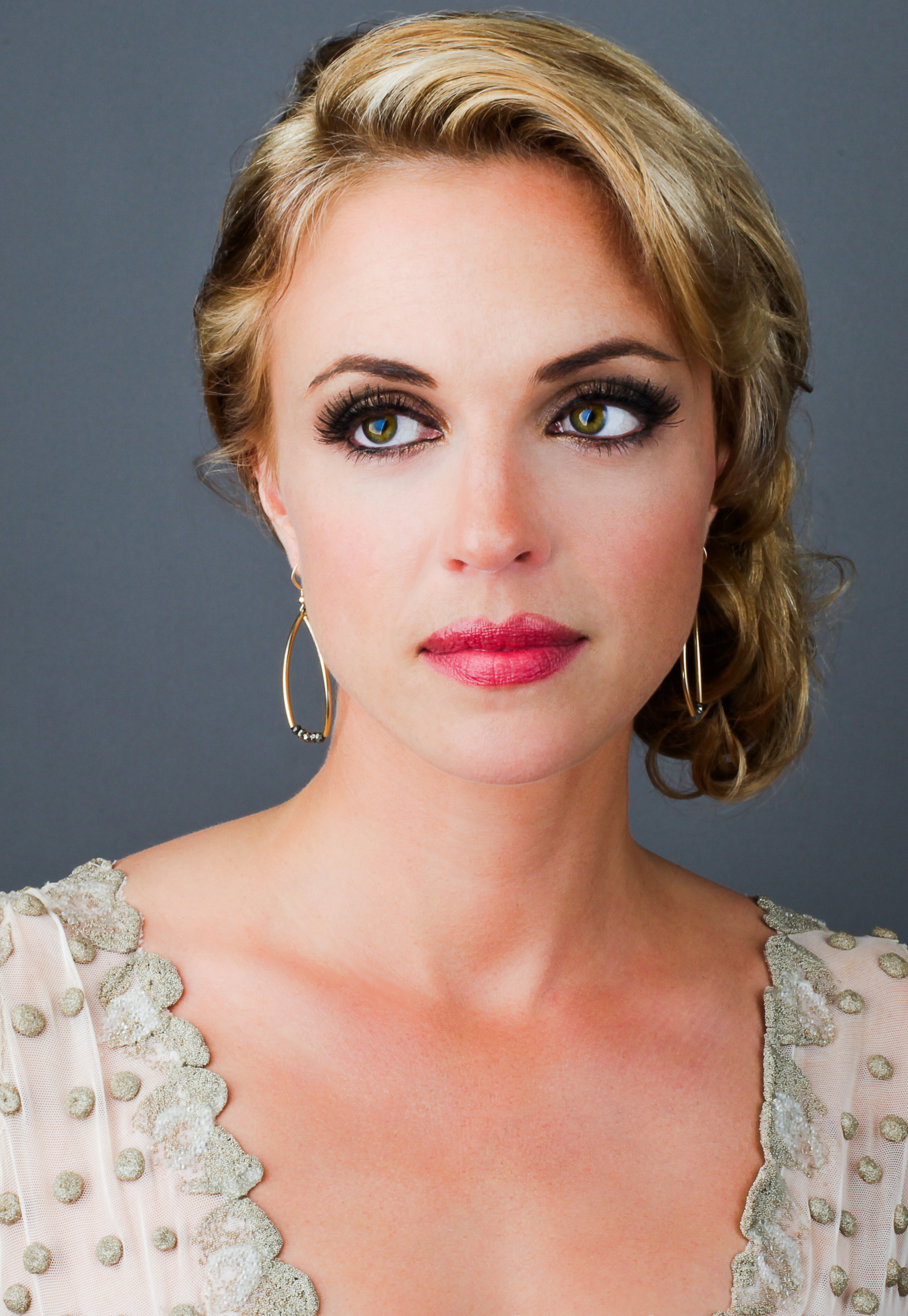
- Kelly Sullivan at the 84th Academy Awards
- Occupation: Actress
- Years active: 2000–present
- Website: kellysullivan.com

Kelly Sullivan is an American actress. She is known for her role as Kate Howard on the ABC daytime soap opera General Hospital, which she portrayed from September 2011 until August 2013, before reappearing briefly in October 2014. She also played Sage Warner on the CBS daytime soap opera The Young and the Restless from October 28, 2014, to June 22, 2016. She starred as Bonnie Hayes in the TLC drama series Too Close to Home.

== Career ==
Sullivan played Kate Howard and eventually the character's alternate personality, Connie Falconeri, on the ABC daytime soap opera General Hospital from September 2011 until August 2013. She took over the role from actress Megan Ward, and in 2012 told MSN Entertainment, "recasting is never easy".

From 2014 to 2016, Sullivan played Sage Warner on the CBS soap opera The Young and the Restless. In 2016, she was cast as Bonnie Hayes in the Tyler Perry drama series Too Close to Home on TLC.

== Theater ==
Sullivan got her first Broadway show role in Contact at the Vivian Beaumont Theater in New York City; she also was featured in Bells Are Ringing and Young Frankenstein.

== Filmography ==
Film roles
Year	Title	Role	Notes
2005	The Producers	Bavarian Peasant	
2009	My Father's Will	Cassandra	
2009	Winter of Frozen Dreams	Pretty Woman at Party	
2009	According to Greta	Tracy	
2009	Ice Grill, U.S.A.	Sandy Veil	
2012	The Test	Julia	
2012	Found in Time	Jina	
TBA	Haunted: 333	Amy Wisez	Unreleased film

Television roles
Year	Title	Role	Notes
2007	Law & Order: Criminal Intent	Lieutenant Jessica Hart	Episode: "Rocket Man"
2011–2014	General Hospital	Kate Howard / Connie Falconeri	Contract role
2014–2020	Henry Danger	Siren Hart (Her real name is Kris Hart)	Recurring role
2014–2016	The Young and the Restless	Sage Warner	Contract role
2016–2017	Too Close to Home	Bonnie Hayes	Main role
2016	Give Me My Baby	Layla	Television film; also known as The Stranger Inside
2017	Brooklyn Nine-Nine	Cassie Sinclair	Episode: "Serve & Protect"
2018	Five Points	Vickie	Episode: "Everybody Knows"
2018	The Adventures of Kid Danger	Kris Hart	Voice role; 3 episodes
2018	Her Boyfriend's Secret	Melissa	Television film
2018	Til Ex Do Us Part	Sophia	Television film
2018	Instakiller	Layla	Television film
2018	Killer Grandma	Melissa Ferriday	Television film; also known as Killer in Law
2019	The Morning Show	Vicki Manderly	Episode: "That Woman"
2021–2023	Never Have I Ever	June Hall-Yoshida	4 episodes (season 2–4)
2022	Danger Force	Clone Kris / Tiny Clone Kris	Episode: "Attack of the Clones"
2023	The Winchesters	Joan Hopkins / Akrida Queen	Episode: "Hey, That's No Way to Say Goodbye"
2026-present	The Bold and the Beautiful	Darcy Dylan	Recurring role

== Stage ==
Year	Title	Role	Notes
2000–2002	Contact	Swing	
2001	Bells Are Ringing	Swing	
2008–2009	Young Frankenstein	Inga	Role: July 8, 2008 to Unknown
2010	Robin and the 7 Hoods	Marian Archer	

== Awards and nominations ==
Year	Award	Category	Title	Result	Ref.
2014	Daytime Emmy Award	Outstanding Supporting Actress in a Drama Series	General Hospital	Nominated	
2017	Daytime Emmy Award	Outstanding Supporting Actress in a Drama Series	The Young and the Restless	Nominated	
2018	Soap Awards France	Best New Character	The Young and the Restless	Nominated	
