= Kate Howard =

- General Hospital character
- Kelly Sullivan as Kate Howard
- Portrayed by: Megan Ward (2007–2010, 2018–2020); Kelly Sullivan (2011–2014); Lindsay Bushman (2011)
- Duration: 2007–2014; 2018; 2020
- First appearance: May 4, 2007
- Last appearance: December 16, 2020
- Created by: Robert Guza, Jr.
- Introduced by: Jill Farren Phelps (2007, 2011); Frank Valentini (2018, 2020)
- Book appearances: The Secret Life of Damian Spinelli
In-universe information
- Other names: Constanza Louise Falconeri (birth name/alternate personality); Katherine Hardwicke Howard; Connie Falconeri-Zacchara
- Occupation: Businesswoman; Journalist
- Spouse: Johnny Zacchara (2012–2013)
- Sons: Trey Mitchell
- Aunts and uncles: Nicky; Talia [Garibaldi] Falconeri
- First cousins: Vito Falconeri; Violetta Falconeri; Vinnie Falconeri; Phil Falconeri; Olivia Falconeri
- Other relatives: Dante Falconeri

Kate Howard is a fictional character from the ABC Daytime soap opera General Hospital. The character was originated by actress Megan Ward, who portrayed the role from May 2007 to October 2010. In September 2011, the role was re-introduced with actress Kelly Sullivan. Connie is known for having two distinct alternate personalities – Connie, who later changed her name to Kate Howard, who established her career and who the character was initially introduced as, and an alternate personality also named Connie, who was based on her life back in Bensonhurst. Sullivan departed the role in August 2013, when the character was killed off, but made a one-off appearance in October 2014. Ward briefly returned for one episode in January 2018, and for another in December 2020.

== Casting ==
The faces of Kate Howard

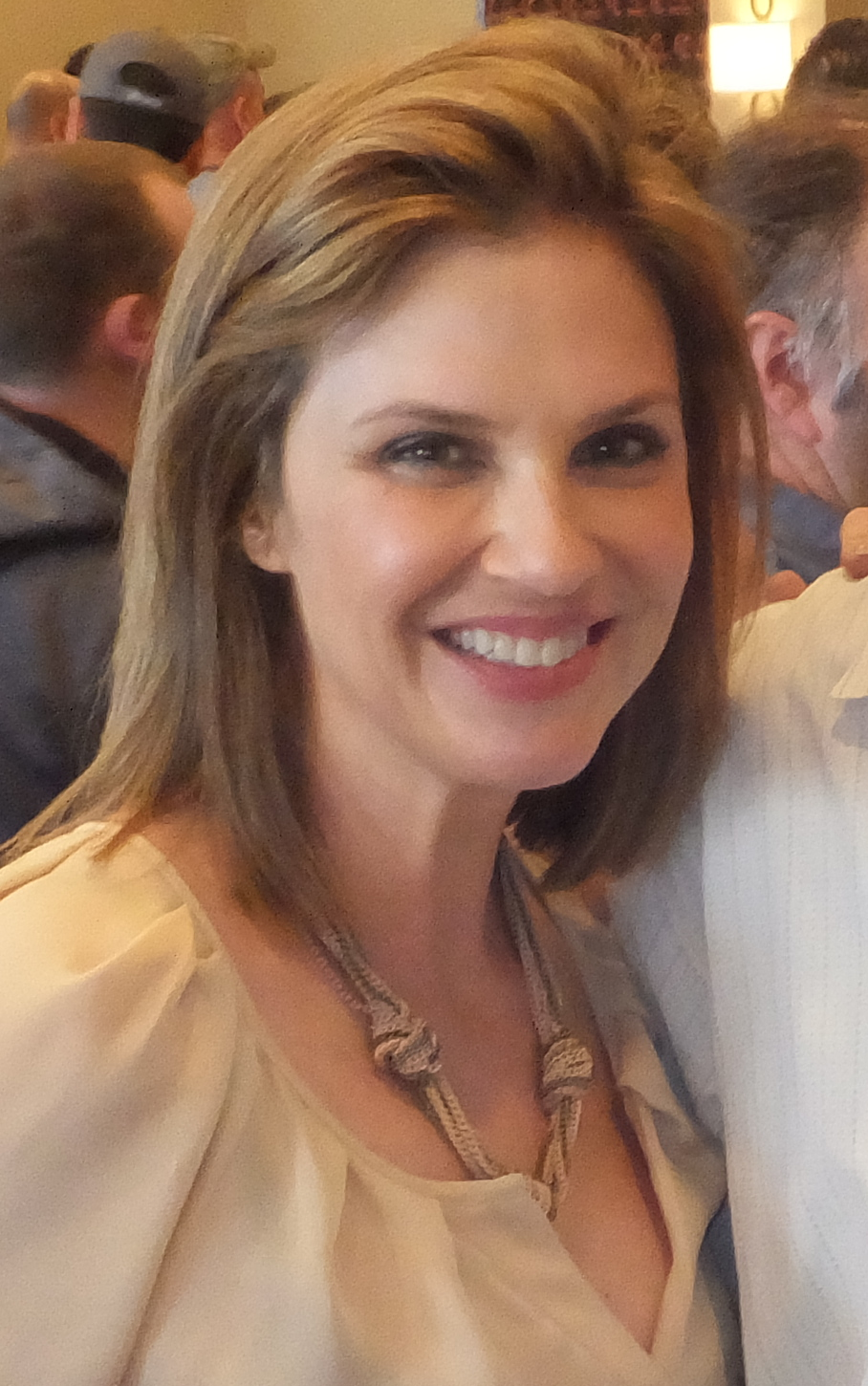
Megan Ward originated the role of Kate, appearing from 2007 to 2010; she reprised the role in 2018 and 2020, respectively.

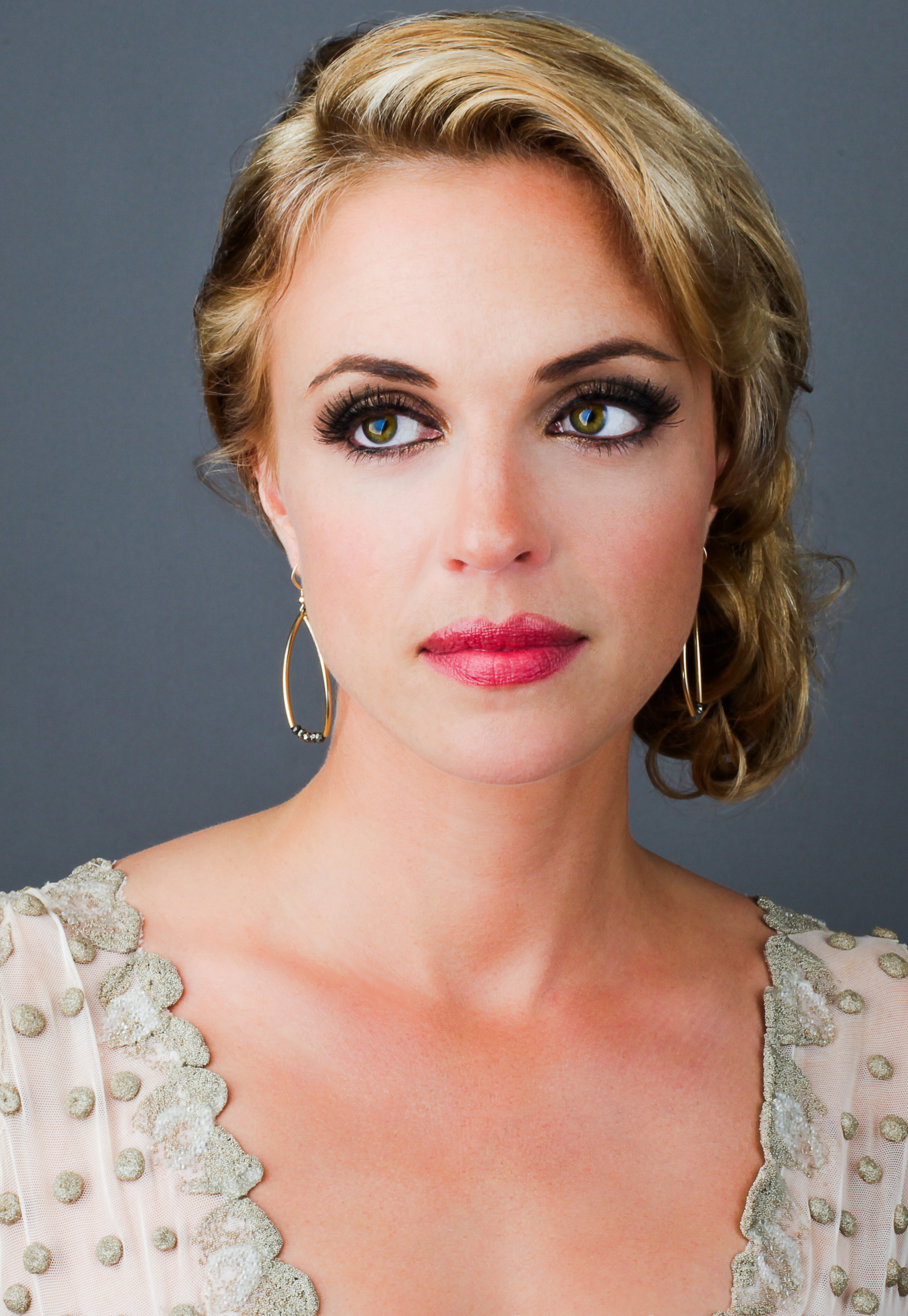
Kelly Sullivan was cast of Ward's successor in 2011; she departed the role in 2014.

The role of Kate Howard was originated by actress Megan Ward in May 2007. Lisa LoCicero, who would later be cast as Olivia Falconeri, auditioned for the role prior to Ward's casting. Ward remained on contract with the series until 2009, when she and actor Rick Hearst were dropped to a recurring status. Ward continued to make appearances as Kate, until she vacated the role in 2010; her final appearance as Kate was on October 20, 2010. In summer 2011, it was rumored that then-new headwriter Garin Wolf was looking to recast the character. In July 2011, it was confirmed that actress Kelly Sullivan had been cast in the role. Sullivan debuted in the role on September 12, 2011. Lindsay Bushman briefly played the role of a young Kate in flashbacks later that year.

Speculation arose in June 2013 that Sullivan had been let go by the ABC series. Sullivan later confirmed her exit on her Facebook webpage, confirming, "Thank you all so much for your support and loyalty," she wrote. "You are my life long family and I cannot express how much I appreciate each of you. You have really made my experience here on GH a wonderful adventure. I wanted to fill you all in on the details and try to answer some of your questions. I am not returning to GH after August. This is not a contract issue, I have been written off the show. I do not have any information on potential Daytime opportunities. Lastly, I have no ill feelings towards any of the staff or crew connected to the show or the network. I will miss everyone dearly. Love, Kelly" Sullivan will remain with the series through August. Sullivan filmed her final scenes on Friday, July 26, 2013. Following the news of her departure, rumors began to circulate that the character of Connie would be killed off. Sullivan eventually confirmed those rumors at a fan event in late July. Upon Connie's death on August 27, 2013, Sullivan tweeted: "RIP Connie [...] It was a great two years! Thank you for your love and support, it means so much. Long live GH!" Sullivan reprised the role during the October 24, 2014, episode.

Ward made an unannounced one-off visit on January 17, 2018, during a special one-off episode focused on the surgery of Ava Jerome (Maura West). On December 16, 2020, Ward made a surprise guest appearance, appearing to William deVry's Julian Jerome.

== Character development and portrayal ==
=== Megan Ward ===
Megan Ward has stated in various interviews that in her opinion, Kate Howard is a woman full of contradictions. She is a character constantly trying to hide where she came from and who she really is, Connie Falconeri. Ward explained "I'm not just playing Kate, [...] [i]t's Kate and Connie and then the person who was in between in the arc of how she became Kate. There are a lot of contradictions with her because Kate comes on incredibly strong and incredibly dismissive[...] But, the reason she is that way is because she's concealing and hiding. She's projecting a persona to intimidate, but she's also putting up a wall to cover the truth of who she is and the emotion and vulnerability she has."

In an interview with Soap Opera Digest, Ward further explained that it was challenging portraying Kate, who is "that person who is strong and flawed and one can be critical of", because she had to maintain "the qualities of Connie, the girl Sonny fell in love with. She's still completely in there." Additionally, the actress mentioned: "I have to play the projection of Kate Howard, but it's all covering the Connie Falconeri underneath. Creatively, I've had to constantly balance being forceful and dominating in situations, but still let you see the true girl doesn't mean to be that forceful and dominating."

During an interview with Soap Opera Weekly, Ward cited Anna Wintour as inspiration for the character, an "older woman who's had a long career", but she wasn't "of that age yet". Of inspirations for the character, she further said: "I draw from Aerin Lauder, Estée Lauder's granddaughter, who runs the Estée Lauder company, and a well-known interior designer named Kelly Wearstler, who was one of the judges on Bravo's TOP DESIGN. What I loved about her was every week she had a completely different look." Ward relates more to Connie, a "smart girl" who knew what she wanted, than Kate who is a "creation" and a "manufactured identity". She stated that "What's sad about Connie, and she's learning that as we go along, is she might have been wrong that she had to be Kate Howard to get where she is. That's what Sonny represents for her. You have to be strong and ambitious to accomplish great tasks, but you don't necessarily have to be purely Kate Howard."

=== Kelly Sullivan ===
Sullivan admitted during an interviewer with soap columnist Michael Fairman of On-Air On-Soaps that she was not hesitant taking over the role following Ward's departure. She said she wasn't worried because she didn't "know a lot about Megan and Kate's story", and "Ignorance is always bliss", explaining: "Obviously, when I first started I was very much introduced to the soap opera fans, and all the Megan fans. You can't win em all, but that's OK. Megan did an incredible job and is such a great actress, and she really set the bar high." Sullivan also admitted she did not know about the "split personality" storyline:

When I first came in to audition, I was not aware of the split personality. But I remember shortly after I started filming, maybe a couple weeks in to it, Garin Wolf was there. I had a meeting with him and that is when he told me about the split personality. He explained it to me in a very cool way, and that he was really excited and passionate about it, which gave me more excitement for myself.

Sullivan, on personalities of Connie and Kate (2012)

If Connie was more stable, she would go about this in a different way than going to Sonny's worst enemy and inciting a mob war. It's hysterical. Connie is so determined to save herself and Kate that she'll probably do it with anyone that's willing – So why not just go for the postman? [..] What's cool is that Kate doesn't have any awareness of what happens when Connie comes out, but Connie knows all.

— Deanna Barnert, MSN Entertainment

Sullivan stated she would love for Victoria Lord (Erika Slezak) and Jessica Buchanan (Bree Williamson) to crossover from One Life to Live to General Hospital to help Kate out with controlling her alter, "Connie". She described the disease as "a scary thing. It's a mental illness and it's terrible, and how you work through it to get healthy is such a journey. That is why I am really happy that Ron is here at GH. There is a very specific way to deal with this illness. I don't know much, but I know that they are going to take their time to work it out."

In an interview with MSN Entertainment, Kelly Sullivan has stated in interviews that coming in as a recast, "Recasting is never easy, for any party involved. Megan [Ward] created the role and set the bar very high. To be able to come in after that [...] She established a strong presence and essence of the character. A lot of her fans were resistant, but it's different now, because we started recreating something that is mine." She hoped that "as this storyline keeps getting more interesting and crazy, more people will get on board and just have fun." The actress wanted Connie to come out as the winner, explaining: "Connie's a broad and I always root for the underdog, the misunderstood person - Connie's not just "evil." She has a right to feel the way she does. She's hurt and scared. And also overtly sexual".

In the interview with MSN, Sullivan also discussed portraying a character with dissociative identity disorder, "It's awesome. When I get my scripts, I can't wait to see what mischief I'm up to. I've been doing the most insane, exciting things and it's all culminating." Kate is Connie's "worst enemy in some ways". Of how her disorder came about, the actress said it "stems from past trauma. We spent a bit of time talking about these issues she's never dealt with, regarding her family and her choice to run away and create this whole new reality for herself. Kate is her worst enemy in some ways. With her resistance to violence and guns, she's now neck deep in it again with Sonny. She loves this man so much, but she also has to marry into is his life." The show's head writer Ron Carlivati also weighed in on the storyline and opened up about the character's descent into her life with D.I.D. He said: "the seeds of Connie – this other personality of Kate's – were planted long before I got there. It was very clear that that's the direction the story was going in, and I had two options: To continue it, or to drop it. And having written multiple personalities on the other show, at first I felt this wasn't something I wanted to do again, but it was so beautifully set up".

== Storylines ==
=== Backstory ===
Upon first introduction, Kate Howard is famous for being the editor-in-chief of a high fashion magazine, similar to the character of Miranda Priestly in The Devil Wears Prada. Her history is told through bits of dialogue, primarily between her Sonny Corinthos (Maurice Benard). Through these glimpses, it is revealed Kate Howard was born Constanza Louise Falconeri, Connie for short by those who knew her. She was raised in Bensonhurst, New York, to an Italian American family, where she worked at a bakery and attended Sacred Heart Catholic school in Brooklyn, New York.

At the age of 18, wanting a better life for herself, Connie legally changed her name to Kate Howard, after Catherine Howard, the fifth wife of King Henry VIII. Her desire was to choose an easily recognizable name that alluded to a good background and social standing. She attended Princeton University, on a full scholarship and worked her way up the ranks to become the editor of the fictional top fashion magazine, Couture. Since then, she has hidden her past as Connie Falconeri, claiming instead to be from Connecticut.

Kate and mob boss Sonny Corinthos dated as teenagers and had planned to run away together, but on the night they were to leave, she stood him up. She later explained to him that she wanted to pursue her dreams of having a career, something she could not do had she run away with Sonny.

=== 2007–2010 ===
The character was introduced on May 8, 2007, when Kate walks into Sonny's office unannounced, and demands the use of a phone because her car had broken down. Sonny eventually recognizes her as Connie Falconeri, his former love from Bensonhurst. Diane Miller (Carolyn Hennesy), Sonny's lawyer, later mentions Kate is considered one of the "100 Most Powerful Women in America." Kate purchases a mansion next door to Sonny. Soon after, Kate is suffering from a headache and mistakenly takes a libido-enhancement pill from a friend instead of ibuprofen. Under the effects of the drug, she seduces Sonny. When Kate is arrested for reckless driving and a hit and run, she is released into Sonny's custody, after spending the night in jail. The interim District Attorney, Ric Lansing (Rick Hearst), refuses the plea agreement, seeking to take revenge on Sonny through Kate. Kate's friend and former lover, Trevor Lansing, blackmails his son Ric, threatening him with losing custody of his daughter if he did not reduce the charges against Kate.

Trevor tries to blackmail Kate into choosing between Sonny or him and her career, but pulling crucial advertisements from Couture magazine. After a confrontation with Trevor, Kate is drugged and gets into a car accident. She faces serious legal action due to her prior driving records, but when Sonny blackmails a judge, she instead receives six months of community service. Infuriated, Trevor has her fired from Couture, leading Kate to start her own magazine. Jasper Jacks (Ingo Rademacher) becomes her partner and financier.

Kate moves back to Manhattan trying to get away from Sonny. Sonny takes her to Bensonhurst, where they visit several memorable places from the youth. Sonny then proposes, but Kate does not answer and runs away. She later tells Sonny that she did not accept his proposal because he does not love her as who she is now; he loves Connie from Bensonhurst. Megan Ward echoes her character's words; she stated Kate "fears that Sonny is really in love with the girl she was and not the woman she has become". An emotional Kate meets with Jasper Jacks. Megan Ward explained her character was "feeling very lost" and that is "why she came clean to Jax". Kate admits her life as Connie in Bensonhurst to Jax, who asks what her family thinks. Kate does not answer the question on several occasions, leading fans and magazines to speculate the character is keeping a secret.

Later, Kate meets with Sonny in an attempt to reconcile. Soon after she is scouting a warehouse building for her magazine, when she is accidentally shot by Sonny's son, Michael Corinthos (Dylan Cash). Sonny finds her and she survives surgery. Kate forgives Michael for what happened. Sonny attempts to leave organized crime, and Kate accepts his marriage proposal. Kate brings Michael to Sonny's coffee warehouse on Sonny's request, where Michael is shot by a stray bullet meant for Sonny. Sonny and Kate attempt to marry, but Kate is shot at the altar. Kate's cousin Olivia Falconeri (LoCicero), who had come to Port Charles to be her maid of honor, stays through her recovery and ends up moving to town. Sonny sleeps with his ex-wife Carly Corinthos Jacks on the way home from dropping off their son Michael to his permanent care facility. Kate learns the truth from Jax, leading to her officially ending her relationship with Sonny.

In 2010, Dante Falconeri (Dominic Zamprogna), then known as Dominic, was found out to be Sonny's son from his short-lived relationship with Kate's cousin, Olivia. Sonny and Kate have a conversation about Kate's knowledge of Dante and the fact she kept it from him since they were teenagers. Kate also acknowledges she finally knows that they were never meant to be, with Sonny nodding his head in agreement. It is also implied Sonny doesn't hold a grudge that Kate didn't tell him about Dante.

=== 2011–2014, 2018, 2020 ===
Kate (Sullivan) returns to Port Charles, resuming her role at Crimson. She helps Sonny come to terms with his childhood abuse from his father. The pair return to Bensonhurst in December, and spend Christmas together. They later decide to attempt a reconciliation and slowly rebuild their relationship. Kate tells Sonny that she's seeing a psychiatrist out of town. It's later revealed that during her run-in with Jax, he signed over his share and rights to the MetroCourt to her, making her Carly's partner in the running of the hotel. After an argument with Sonny, it's revealed that Kate still has possession of her bloody wedding dress, locked away in an oak chest. Kate continues to get dropped phone calls and mysterious calls from unknown callers.

At the Pulmonary event at the MetroCourt, Johnny unveils that Anthony is not his father but his grandfather. He promises to make Sonny pay for destroying his family. In the parking garage, a hitman shoots at Dante; Sonny interferes and gets shot himself. Upon finding out Sonny had been shot, Kate rushed to the garage and began to zone out of reality. She then visited Sonny in the hospital and left his side after he wanted to take revenge, ending their relationship again. She then goes to the dock, in her bloody wedding gown and is unsure of why she's there. She continued to act very despondent, and had difficulty recalling the events on the night. Kate then confesses to Dr. Ewen Keenan (Nathin Butler) that she's been finding random pieces of paper with names and phone numbers on them following her blackouts.

After splitting with Sonny, the two reconnect on her desk. She continues to insist she is not "Connie" but "Kate". However, once he leaves, she continues to smell her old perfume. She shows up at Johnny Zacchara (Brandon Barash)'s and insists she is "Connie" and that "Kate" is the one with the problem. As "Connie" hatches her plan to use Johnny as a ploy to get "Kate" away from Sonny, "Kate" continues to struggle with her memories fading in and out. She confesses to Ewen that does still does not remember certain things about her days and he insists she possibly has dissociative identity disorder, also known as DID. Johnny then arrives at the Crimson offices and pushes Kate to let Connie out, who ropes Johnny back into her plan, despite his decision to not go ahead with it. As they begin to have sex on her office desk, Kate re-emerges and throws Johnny out, cowering into her sweater, confused over her actions.

As Kate continues to be forced between herself and Connie, sometimes losing control for several hours at the time, she begins seeing Ewen as her official therapist. Ewen suggests that he hypnotize her, in order to find out why "Connie" was created. As Connie emerges, she reveals that she was created to protect Kate from Sonny's hold and that he's almost gotten them killed one, and that he's on the verge of having it happen again. She also confesses to planting a gun in Kate's office in order to send Sonny to jail for murdering Cole Thornhart (Van Hughes) and Hope Manning-Thornhart.

Kate agrees to have herself voluntarily committed into a mental institution, to gain control of herself from Connie. She agrees to it, as long as she's able to say goodbye to Sonny. She then arrives at Sonny's home, and tells him she has something to tell him. However, she's interrupted by the jury's verdict in Sonny's trial, which resulted in him being found guilty. They are interrupted again by Max and Olivia, the latter of whom attacks Kate once again over changing her name and alienating her past. Cracking under Olivia's pressure, Kate runs off and has a confrontation with Connie (through her psyche) and results in Connie, once again, being unleashed.

Connie (as Kate) then decides to throw Sonny a birthday party, mixed with a party for him being found not guilty on charges of murder. At the party, Connie destroys his birthday cake and then sleeps with Johnny. After Sonny catches "Kate" with Johnny, he breaks off their relationship with Kate then returning. When she agrees to Dr. Keenan's terms of turning herself into the psych ward, Connie reemerges, bashing Ewen over the head. Connie then decides to leave Port Charles, but not before getting into a physical altercation with Carly, who discovers a paper labeling Kate with DID. At the airport, Kate attempts to escape, with no avail. When her plane is about to board, she runs into Jason, who stops her from getting on. After Jason rattles Connie, Kate re-emerges, only to be contained by PCPD for attacking Dr. Ewen. Jason helps arrange a meeting between Sonny and Kate, in which she admits she has a multiple personality that has caused the rift between them.

During her time in a psych hospital, Kate relives painful memories concerning her teens, including being raped by Joe Scully, Jr. (Richard Steinmetz), which resulted in her pregnancy and leaving Sonny. She confesses that after having her son, she left him in a drawer in her boarding school, and legally changed her name to Kate Howard to escape the painful past. Kate later discovers her son is alive, and living under the name Trey Mitchell (Erik Valdez), and has been dating Sonny's daughter Kristina Davis (Lindsey Morgan). After Sonny proposes, Kate begins to feel conflicted again, and reverts to Connie. At their wedding, Connie unveils herself and reveals her marriage to Johnny, as a blackmail situation to keep Johnny's secret over killing Cole and Hope, a confession Connie took credit for. Connie continues to blackmail Johnny and Todd. She later comes across a manuscript of a novel written by Molly Lansing, and changed it around and sold it to Todd's publishers. After Johnny tells Connie he is ready to confess his crimes, she kidnaps him and traps him in the back of her car. On New Year's Eve, Trey and Kristina get suspicious and follow Connie's car through the fog. Trying to get away from the other car, Connie accidentally hits Ellie Trout, and then collides with the other car.

Connie deals with the guilt she feels for causing the accident that left Trey brain-dead. She is initially resistant to take Trey off life-support, but Sonny is able to convince her it is the right thing to do. As Connie reveals she wanted to get to know her son, Sonny is surprised and amazed that Connie is developing a compassionate side. They both start to develop feelings for each other and sleep together on Valentine's Day, where Connie tells Sonny that for the first time in her life, she is truly happy. Kate reemerges and is shocked to find Sonny in bed with Connie. Sonny and Olivia tell her everything she missed in the 5 months Connie was in control. Connie is revealed to have control again and vows revenge against Sonny for sleeping with Kate. Connie goes to the book launch at The Floating Rib, where she eventually tells the crowd that Molly is the actual author. Sonny catches up with her, though, and convinces Connie to check into Shadybrook. Kate returns to Sonny and said she is integrated and will go by Connie and loves him but can't be with him. Soon afterwards, Connie decides to return to Crimson and focus on her work again. While fully integrated, she convinces Maxie that she can have her old job back. She then begins to get closer with Olivia and reveals she is still in love with Sonny. In June 2013, Olivia is accidentally shot by an unknown assailant, who was targeting Franco. While fearing for her cousin's life, Connie confesses her lingering feelings for Sonny, but fears he may have feelings for Olivia instead. In July 2013, Olivia begins staying with Sonny to recuperate, and Connie decides to get Sonny back before she loses him to Olivia. Connie then goes to Sonny's house and tells him that she wants to be with him. Olivia promptly decides to move out of Sonny's house so he and Connie can rekindle their relationship. In August 2013, in order to save her newspaper, Connie publishes a story about Kiki Jerome (Kristen Alderson) not being Franco (Roger Howarth)'s daughter, after promising Sonny she wouldn't. Connie overhears Olivia admitting her feelings for Sonny. Connie overhears her boss Julian Jerome (deVry)—under the alias of Derek Wells—talking on the phone and referring to himself as Julian. In August 2013, Sonny finds Connie shot in her office. Before she dies, she writes the letters "AJ" in blood. It was later revealed that she was shot and killed by Ava Jerome (West) after it was revealed that Connie found out about Derek Wells being Julian Jerome, and Ava's connection with him. In 2018, Connie (Ward) appears via Ava's subconscious, where she reminds Ava of her actions. Two years later, Connie appears to Julian, alongside Duke Lavery (Ian Buchanan).

== Reception ==
General Hospital fan response has been overwhelmingly positive of the pairing of Sonny Corinthos and Kate Howard. They are consistently among the Top 10 Couples with the wedding of Sonny and Kate becoming a sweeps event for GH. Fans were disgusted in March 2009, when ABC announced General Hospital was dropping Megan Ward to recurring status and Rick Hearst (Ric Lansing) off contract, which resulted in him last airing that June.

Following Sullivan's inception of the character, she was given the title of "Performer of the Week" on On Air On Soaps. Site editor, Michael Fairman, stated:

And in a startling, intense, heartbreaking tour de force, GH's Kelly Sullivan is showing what she is made of playing the complex DID storyline and making it fresh, when many said it couldn't be done! With her magnificent scene partner, Maurice Benard (Sonny) playing the beats of a heartbroken lover who deep down loves Kate, he watches in shock and sadness as Kate talks to her alter Connie who is trying desperately to deduce what happened the night Anthony Zacchara's tires were shot out, which in turn killed Cole and Hope. Then, when Sonny meets Connie for the first time, Sullivan really pulled out all the stops! We loved when Connie imitated Kate when she said, "Oh Sonny. I have to see Sonny." Then the line that followed (which we also loved) was Connie telling Sonny about Kate not being able to stay away from him, "She's an addict and you're a big hunk of crack." It was drama at its best and Sullivan and Bernard made this work!

The D.I.D. storyline was named one of Daytime Confidential's top ten most memorable D.I.D. story lines in soap opera history.

=== In popular culture ===
The character of Kate Howard is reminiscent of Miranda Priestly (portrayed by Streep) from The Devil Wears Prada (2006) and Anna Wintour, editor of Vogue. Ward has stated she has also based her character on Aerin Lauder and Kelly Wearstler.
