= Lindsay Bushman =

American actress

- Occupation: Actress
- Years active: 2011–2016

Lindsay Bushman is an American former actress who is best known for her role on The Young and the Restless as Summer Newman.

== Early life ==
Lindsay Bushman's small screen debut was on CW's The Ringer in 2011. She portrayed Erica described as a 'hot mess'.

== Career ==
She made her feature film debut in the film Hello Herman.

On May 11, 2012, it was announced the Bushman had been cast in the role of the Summer Newman in The Young and the Restless. Bushman made her first appearance on June 8, 2012 on a recurring basis. Nelson Branco of TV Guide Canada announced the news of Bushman's departure in his magazine, Soap Opera Uncensored in September 2012.

Bushman had a small bit role on General Hospital as a young Kate Howard in a flashback. Bushman revealed that she got the audition thanks to her agent and booked the role after a few callbacks and chemistry reads.

== Filmography ==
Year	Title	Role	Notes
2011	Brother and Sisterly Love: The Proposal	Kate	TV movie
2011	Cats Dancing on Jupiter	Linda Katz	
2011	Ringer	Erica	Episode: "A Whole New Kind of Bitch"
2011	General Hospital	Young Kate Howard	Flashbacks
2012	Southland	Funky Whit Girl	Episode: "Underwater"
2012	The Finder	Doppelwilla	Episode: "The Last Meal"
2012	The Young and the Restless	Summer Newman	Recurring; 23 episodes
2012	Hello Herman	Susan	Supporting role
2012–13	Boys Are Stupid, Girls Are Mean	Cady	3 episodes
2013	Nightcomer	Blonde Teen	
2013	White Girls	Lauren	Episode: "Mandy Didn't..."
2013	Lost and Found	Katie	
2013	Poop Notice	Hillary	Episode: "Sit Up"
2013	Madden Girl	Bambi	4 episodes
2013	Perception	Maddy	Episode: "Toxic"
2013	The Secret Lives of Dorks	Cheerleader	
2013	CSI: Crime Scene Investigation	Emily Bridwell	Episode: "Frame by Frame"
2014	Séance	Hudson	
2014	Bad Teacher	Cute Girl	Episode: "Yearbook"
2014	Sequestered	Kaitlyn	
2014	Case Number 13	Hayley	
2016	His Secret Past	Kelly	TV movie
