= Jennifer Smith (General Hospital) =

Fictional character from General Hospital

- General Hospital character
- Portrayed by: Lisa Marie (1980); Roseanne Arnold (1994); Sally Struthers (2002); Holly Gagnier (2015, 2022)
- Duration: 1980; 1994; 2002; 2015; 2022
- First appearance: 1980
- Last appearance: April 8, 2022
- Created by: Pat Falken Smith and Margaret DePriest
- Introduced by: Gloria Monty (1980); Wendy Riche (1994); Jill Farren Phelps (2002); Frank Valentini (2015, 2022)
In-universe information
- Occupation: Gangster
- Father: Frank Smith
- Brothers: Damian Smith
- Husband: Billy Boggs (divorced); Luke Spencer (2002)
- Children: Unnamed children

Jennifer Smith is a fictional character on the ABC soap opera, General Hospital. She is the daughter of notorious mobster, Frank Smith, and known for her broken engagement with Luke Spencer. Lisa Marie portrayed the character in 1980, Roseanne Arnold in 1994, Sally Struthers in February 2002, and Holly Gagnier in June 2015. Gagnier returned to the role in 2022.

== Casting ==
The role of Jennifer Smith was originated by actress and model Lisa Marie, in 1980. Shortly after, the character was written out of the show. In 1994, Jennifer returned to the canvass, portrayed by comedian and Roseanne star Roseanne Arnold. Arnold, who is a fan of the series, appeared with her then-husband Tom Arnold, for three episodes in late March 1994. In return, Anthony Geary and Genie Francis, who portray Luke Spencer and Laura Webber, appeared in an episode of Arnold's sitcom, Roseanne. The role was played by All in the Family actress Sally Struthers for 10 episodes in 2002. Struthers said of Jennifer's return, "Needless to say, Jennifer has a few issues with Luke and Laura. She has some unfinished business." Jennifer returned to the screen on June 22, 2015, portrayed by Holly Gagnier. Jennifer is holding Lucky Spencer hostage and demanding that if Luke and Laura want to see Lucky again, Luke Spencer must spend the night with her. Gagnier returned as Jennifer in January 2022 for Luke's funeral. She then returned again that April.

== Storylines ==
=== 1980 ===
In 1980, Jennifer Smith was in love with Luke Spencer. Luke was only involved with Jennifer to gain control of her father, Frank Smith's non-mob related businesses. Laura Webber was jealous of their relationship. Luke and Jennifer decided to get married. Their wedding was going to be held on a yacht. Scott Baldwin discovered that Luke had raped Laura. He found his way on to the yacht and attacked Luke. Luke fell overboard and was presumed dead. He was not. He swam to a dock where Laura was waiting for him. They ran off together. After Frank was put in jail, Jennifer disappeared. She was later said to be in Europe.

=== 1994 ===
In 1994, Luke and Laura ran into Jennifer and her husband, Billy "Baggs" Boggs in Atlantic City. It was clear that Jennifer had never gotten over Luke because she kept flirting with him. Billy was also attracted to Laura. Luke and Laura got away when they threatened to expose theft charges against Jennifer and Billy. If they were exposed, Jennifer would go to prison.

=== 2002 ===
In 2002, Jennifer kidnapped Luke and Laura. She wanted Luke to marry her. She said if he didn't, she would kill Laura. She wanted Laura's death to be a wedding present to her. Roy DiLucca posed as the priest for the ceremony and Felicia Jones posed as his wife. Roy and Felicia helped Luke and Laura escape without harm.

=== 2015 ===
After Laura crashed Luke and Tracy Quartermaine’s engagement party. The two raced off to find their kidnapped son - Lucky. They were lured to the Triple L Diner where they encountered Jennifer. Jennifer claimed to have Lucky and blackmailed Luke into sex. Luke didnt go through with it and Jennifer admitted she too had been lured there by the kidnappers. She in fact had nothing to do with the kidnapping.

== Reception ==
The Milwaukee Journal said of the Luke and Jennifer's wedding scenes being interrupted by the 1980 Republican convention, "A soap fan's worst nightmare." The high-profile appearances by Arnold and Struthers have gained significant critical attention. For their appearances as Jennifer, both actresses were named as some of the best General Hospital cameos of all time. Arnold is regarded not only as one of General Hospital's best guest stars, but one of the best celebrity appearances, in soap opera history. Following her 2022 return, Curtis Harding from Soaps She Knows questioned whether would be "hell to pay" and whether the residents of Port Charles would "survive her stay". Chris Eades from Soaps In Depth wrote that it is "always a bit of a surprise when Jennifer Smith shows up".
