= Parker Forsyth =

- General Hospital character
- Portrayed by: Ashley Jones
- Duration: 2016–17
- First appearance: January 29, 2016
- Last appearance: October 11, 2017
- Created by: Shelly Altman; Jean Passanante
- Introduced by: Frank Valentini
In-universe information
- Occupation: University professor
- Wife: Amanda (divorced)

Parker Forsyth is a fictional character from the American soap opera General Hospital, portrayed by Ashley Jones. She made her first appearance on January 29, 2016. Parker had been previously mentioned on the soap as the university professor that Kristina Davis (Lexi Ainsworth) offered sex to in exchange for a higher grade. However, it was not revealed that Parker was a woman until her first appearance. Jones had to keep her casting a secret in order to make Parker's gender a surprise to viewers. Jones initially appeared in a recurring capacity until April 2016, before returning that summer for a brief stint. Jones later reprised the role in August 2017 before being written out and last appearing on October 11 of that year, alongside Ainsworth.

Parker's introduction was used to explore Kristina's sexuality, which Ainsworth said was a big socially relevant issue. Parker and Kristina eventually kiss and have sex following Parker's split from her wife, but Parker is convinced by Kristina's mother, Alexis Davis (Nancy Lee Grahn), to leave. Parker later returns and begins a relationship with Kristina, but she is fired for having a relationship with Kristina whilst she was still a student, which leads to Parker and Kristina leaving Port Charles for Oregon. Jones explained that the storyline was cut off short and was meant to be revisited, which it was not. Kristina and Parker's relationship was referred to by the portmanteau "Pristina". Jones herself commented on how fans felt betrayed over the storyline not continuing, but believed that the strong response was a testament to the writing and acting. The relationship also received praise from critics for its LGBTQ+ representation.

== Casting ==
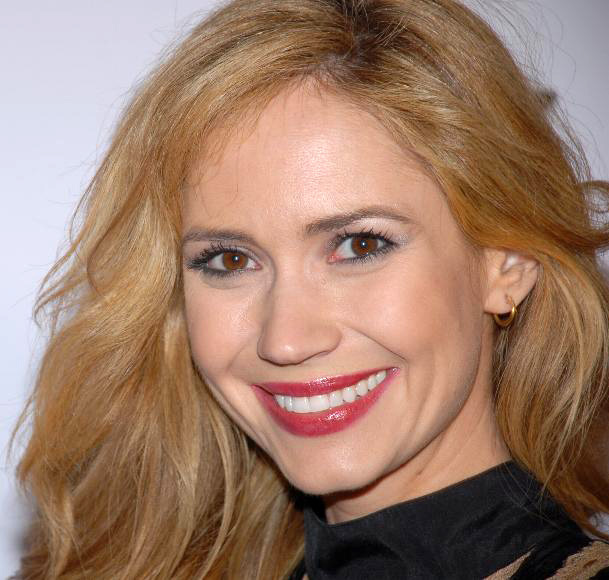
Ashley Jones (pictured) had to keep her casting a secret.

Ashley Jones made her first appearance on General Hospital as Parker Forsyth on January 29, 2016. Her casting was not announced beforehand in order to surprise viewers. When Jones made her first appearance, she had already filmed two episodes as Parker. Jones was happy to join the soap, explaining, "I've watched General Hospital over the years, so it's just a pleasure to see all these people on set and in and out of the makeup room". Jones, who has portrayed Bridget Forrester on another soap opera, The Bold and the Beautiful, on-off since 2004, was reunited with her former co-star, William deVry, who portrayed Briget's uncle, Storm Logan. Jones ran into deVry on her first day and commented, "It made me chuckle to myself about how small the soap world is! I still think of him as my uncle". deVry believed that General Hospital was "lucky" to have Jones joining the cast, calling her "such a professional and a lovely person". Jones was pregnant whilst filming at General Hospital. Parker's initial run lasted through to April 2016. On June 21 of that year, it was announced that Jones had returned to filming at General Hospital, with Jones posting a picture on social media of her with co-star Lexi Ainsworth, who she said she loves working with. Parker's return stint ran from June to July of 2016.

In July 2017, it was announced on the Instagram page of General Hospital that Jones had returned to filming again, with the actress commenting that it was "Good to be back in Port Charles". Jones revealed that she had wanted to announce her return for "quite some time", but had to keep quiet in order to not spoil anything. The soap's executive producer Frank Valentini had previously teased on Twitter that there would a new addition to the cast. Jones did not reveal her return storyline, but teased that there would be "fun and drama". Jones also praised costume designer Shawn Reeves, explaining, "I appreciated that he wanted [Parker] to be bright and fresh. That's probably all I can say for now without getting myself in trouble". Jones returned that August. Parker's return aired in August of that year. In October 2017, it was announced that Jones and her co-star Lexi Ainsworth had been written out of General Hospital and they last appeared on October 11 of that year. Jones, like Ainsworth, did not release a statement about her departure, but when asked by a fan on Twitter if she would return, she replied, "Time will tell (hopefully sooner than later)...", and told the fan to "hang tight".

== Development ==
In 2015, Kristina Davis (Lexi Ainsworth) returned to General Hospital with a "big secret". She eventually confides in her half-sister Sam McCall (Kelly Monaco) that she handled a breakup with her ex-boyfriend badly and fell behind in her university classes, so she prepositioned Parker, her professor, in a "last ditch effort" to raise her grade. Kristina believed that Parker was giving her signals that she was interested, but Parker was not, which results in Kristina being put on academic suspension for a semester and keeping the secret from her parents. However, Parker's gender was not revealed, which was why Jones' casting was announced prior. Jones explained that the soap bosses were "so secretive about it that I've been scared to tell anyone [about joining]. They made it very clear that Parker's gender was the reveal and they didn't want me to give it away." It has been assumed by many viewers that Parker was a man due to Kristina's past relationships being only with men. It is revealed that Parker and Kristina had met after class and shared alcohol, with Parker telling Kristina that her needs were not being met at home.

Parker's introduction scenes showed her show up to Kristina's home to confront Kristina on her "smear campaign" against her, as Parker believes that Kristina has posting negative reviews about her online. Kristina is stunned to see Parker on her doorstep. Parker then meets Kristina's mother, Alexis Davis (Nancy Lee Grahn), and finds out that she has not told her about her suspension, which "sets the stage for innuendos and more". Parker and Kristina both reveal that they have gone to "great lengths to protect their secrets that would threaten their lives", with the married Parker admitting to Kristina that she has a good life with a career, a home and a wife. Parker reveals that she agreed to not talk to Kristina's parents in exchange for Kristina not talking to Parker's wife. When Parker tells Kristina that she prepositioned her, Kristina replies, "Because you wanted it!" Before leaving, Parker tells Kristina that it would be a shame to throw away her life on a single mistake as she had a lot of potential, and tells Kristina to figure out "what she wants and who she wants to be" before her parents figure it out themselves.

Parker's introduction was used for the exploration of Kristina's sexuality. Speaking about the storyline, Ainsworth told Soap Opera Digest, "General Hospital has always been really great about touching on subjects like this, socially relevant issues, and this is a huge one. Everyone is talking right now about sexuality being fluid, and there are many people who have come out and said that they're not just attracted to one sex: they're attracted to who they're attracted to, whether it be a man, woman, transgender. It doesn't matter: love is a universal thing". The continuation of the storyline sees Kristina telling Alexis and her father, Sonny Corinthos (Maurice Benard), about what happened, but does not reveal that her professor was not a man. Sonny tries to investigate and track Parker down to send "him" a message, not knowing that Parker is a woman. Meanwhile, Kristina tells her half-sister, Molly Lansing (Haley Pullos), the whole truth, with Kristina revealing that she is questioning her sexuality. Kristina believes that she is bisexual but is worried about what her parents will think. When Molly questions Kristina about her feelings for Parker, it becomes clear that Kristina is "smitten" with her.

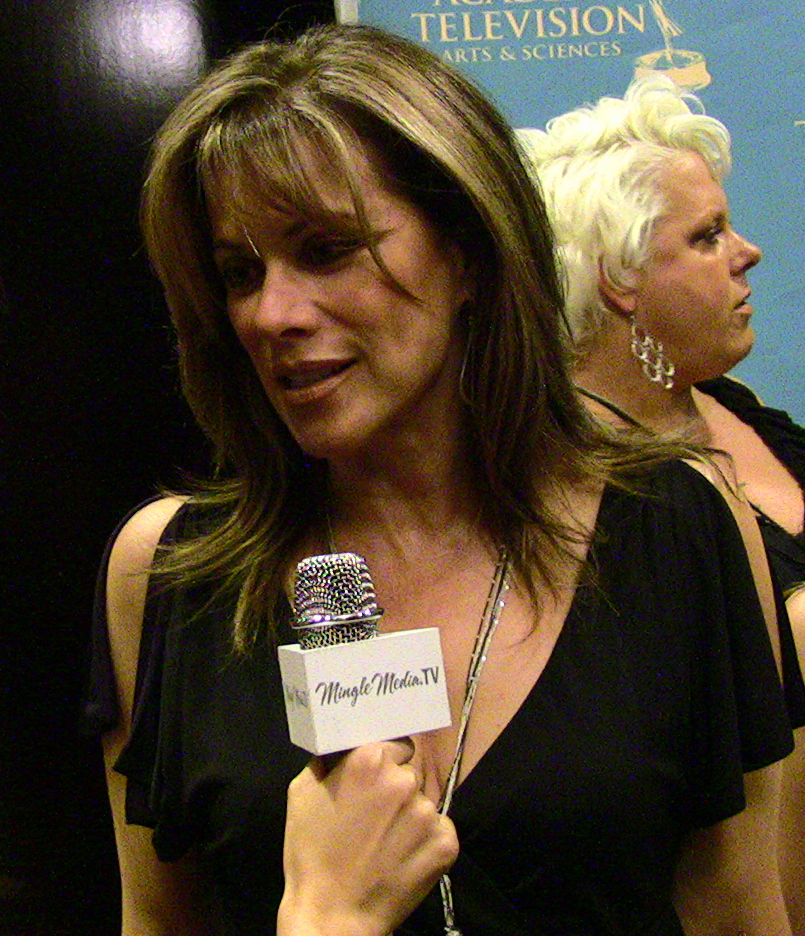
Jones was happy to work with Nancy Lee Grahn (pictured)

Parker returns to town and she and Kristina cannot contain their chemistry, which leads to a kiss. When the truth is revealed, Alexis confronts Parker about her relationship with her daughter. Jones teased that Alexis would go "all Mama Bear" on Parker. Jones was nervous over how the scenes had turned out, writing on her blog, "I've been a fan of Nancy Lee Grahn for years, so getting to work with her in this realm was a treat. We both had a ton of dialogue! I loved exploring the arc of these scenes with her, running lines and then taping". Jones also commented that it was nice receiving "real Mom advice" from Grahn due to Jones expecting her first child. Jones also joked that she would bracing herself following the airing of the scenes as she knew that fans of the soap are "super intense, loyal and opinionated".

In June 2016, General Hospital head writers Shelly Altman and Jean Passanante teased that Parker would get "in the way" of Kristina's growing romance with Aaron Roland (John DeLuca). When Parker returns, she reveals to Kristina that she has broken up with her wife and Kristina comforts her. The two end up having sex together, but after Alexis convinces Parker to leave town, so Parker departs and breaks up with Kristina in a letter.

"When two people meet each other in certain periods of their lives and their lives change because of that — that's a landmark in their life, they'll never forget, and I guess the audience witnessed that. I think that's the magic of that."

— Jones' reflection on Parker and Kristina's relationship and its impact (2022).

Jones returned to the role in August 2017, with Parker being revealed as Molly's new teacher at her and Kristina's university. Speaking of her return, Parker explained that the storyline had been set up in a "very interesting way". Jones commented, "I love that [Parker] is so layered and rich. I think the writers have just barely started to scratch below the surface". In the storyline, Kristina runs into Parker and find out that she was unable to save her marriage, and she later makes Parker jealous when Valerie Spencer (Brytni Sarpy) kisses her. In October 2017, "key episodes" aired in Parker's relationship and storyline development. In the story, Parker and Kristina decide to date and Kristina decides to withdraw from her programme in order for them to be together. However, Parker is fired from the university after the dean finds out that she was seeing Kristina before she withdrew, as Parker's boss saw them kissing prior to the completion of the paperwork. Because of this, Parker and Kristina decide to move to Oregon, with Kristina believing that Alexis interfered and got Parker fired. This resulted in both Jones and Ainsworth leaving the soap opera. ABC executive Nathan Varni explained on the twitter that the character's story had paused for now due to one of the actresses booking another show, but he was hopefully that the storyline would "continue later". However, Ainsworth returned as Kristina in 2018 without Parker, with Kristina revealing that she and Parker have broken up.

In 2022, Jones reflected on the role, calling Ainsworth a "fantastic actress" and revealing that they had a "deep connection" in real life. Jones called the Pristina storyline a "story that just hadn't fully been told yet". Jones commented on the storyline," It was a little bit salacious and a little bit unorthodox, but honestly, I think the beauty of what happened is… it was just a real bond". Jones believed that the audience had not let go of the story as the soap opera "pulled the story before it was finished", with Jones explaining that networks often make decisions that lead to fans feeling a bit betrayed as they are not fulfilled. However, Jones expressed that viewers' wishes for a Parker and Kristina reunion "is a testament to the writing and the characters that they created". The actress added, "The fact that we left some sort of a mark on people's hearts or brains, that's what you hope to do as an actor".

== Storylines ==
When Kristina Davis (Lexi Ainsworth) returns to Port Charlies from Wesleyan University, she reveals to her half-sister Sam McCall (Kelly Monaco) that she offered to have sex with her professor in exchange for a better university grade, as she had been falling behind. However, Kristina does not tell Sam that it was a woman. Months later, Parker arrives to Kristina's house and confronts her, believing that Kristina has been posting negative reviews about her online. Parker meets Kristina's mother, Alexis Davis (Nancy Lee Grahn), and learns that Kristina has not told her parents about her suspension or what happened. Kristina and Parker argue, with Kristina threatening to tell Parker's wife and Parker threatening to tell Kristina's parents. Kristina tells Parker that Parker wanted to her to preposition her, which Parker denies. Before leaving, Parker tells Kristina to figure out what she wants and who she really is. Kristina confides in her other half-sister Molly Lansing (Haley Pullos) that she is questioning her sexuality and believes that she bisexual.

Months later, Parker and Kristina talk and end up sharing a kiss. Parker also speaks to Alexis, who is unhappy about Parker's relationship with her daughter. When Parker returns to give a talk at a university, she reveals that she and her wife have split up. Despite having moved on and dating Aaron Roland (John DeLuca), Kristina comforts Parker and they end up kissing and having sex. However, Parker ends up leaving and breaking up with Kristina in a letter after being convinced to by Alexis, who disapproves of their relationship. Kristina is left feeling confused and hurt by Parker's departure. Meanwhile, Parker tries to fix things with her wife.

Parker later returns to Port Charles and teaches at its university, with Molly becoming her student. Alexis is angry when she finds out that Parker is back in town. Kristina bumps into Parker at a lesbian club night, so Kristina's heterosexual friend Valerie Spencer (Brytni Sarpy) kisses her in front of Parker to make her jealous. Parker and Kristina talk, with the former revealing that her attempt to fix things with her wife did not work. Kristina, who is not enjoying her Business course, decides to drop out of Port Charles University so that she can be with Parker. However, the university Dean sees Parker and Kristina kissing before Kristina's withdrawal paperwork is completed and he fires Parker. Now jobless, Parker decides to move to her parents in Oregon, and Kristina decides to go with her, much to the anger of Alexis. Parker and Kristina leave, but the following year Kristina returns to Port Charles and reveals that they have split up.

== Reception ==
Following Parker's introduction, Michael Fairman from Michael Fairman TV questioned whether Parker's confrontation with Kristina made things clearer to the audience, with Fairman also questioning whether Kristina was just trying to seduce Parker to raise her grades and does not like women or whether Parker's message "rings true", with Kristina needing to figure out who she "truly is". Fairman later wrote that it would be "interesting" to see how the soap hides Jones' pregnancy. Following the news of Jones' return to the role in July 2017, Fairman wrote "Pristina fans, some news you have been waiting for!" Fairman later questioned whether Parker was the threat to Kristina's romance with Aaron or whether she was "Kristina's true love". Following Jones' exit, Fairman reported how "Pristina fans were in an uproar" over the episodes surrounding Parker's firing and exit. Fairman also wrote "Of course" when referring to how Alexis' disapproval of Kristina and Parker's relationship did not help matters.

Kristina and Parker's coupling has been often referred by the portmanteau "Pristina". Charlie Mason and Dustin Cushman from Soaps She Knows placed Parker and Kristina on their list of Daytime's Groundbreaking LGBTQ+ Characters and Couples. Kristyn Burtt from the same website reported in 2022 how fans felt that they had "unfinished business" with Kristina and Parker's relationship and were hoping for a return to the storyline. Jones herself commented on how viewers felt a bit "betrayed" and were unable to let the storyline go as they were not fulfilled, but Jones believed that the strong reaction highlighted the writing and acting's impact. Burtt commented on how Parker and Kristina's relationship "sparked serious discussions on power dynamics and age differences in a relationship". She also commented that fans were "thrilled" when Jones announced that she would be returning to the soap, but added, "Sadly, that visit was short-lived".

Chris Eades from Soaps In Depth wrote that it was unfortunate that Parker broke up with Kristina in a letter. Following Parker's 2017 return, Eades wrote that Parker and Kristina "clearly have unresolved feelings for each other", but questioned whether they would be able to make a relationship work. Prior to the return, Eades had speculated that fans could "look forward to" Parker coming to "complicate" Kristina's life again. In 2020, Eades wrote that there was a still a "loyal group of devoted fans" that were hoping for Jones to return as Parker. Eades also believed that Jones' recurring appearances were very "sparse".

Bryce Cameron from The List called Parker an "inappropriate professor" but believed that Jones had a "decent run" on General Hospital and that her role "often piques people's attention". Cameron added that despite Parker's stints being "limited", the ramifications of the character's actions were still being felt on the soap as of 2022. Cameron also called Kristina's confession about propositioning Parker "jarring" and believed that the women had an "obvious attraction" to each other. He also commented on how Parker's "careless mistake" of playing "aggressive round of tonsil hockey" with Kristina prior to the completion of Kristina's withdrawal paperwork resulted in "doom" for Parker's career.

In 2023, Cameron wrote that Parker's introduction not only "captured lightning in a bottle" but also began "a groundbreaking story unique in the world of soap operas", with Cameron noting the lack of LGBTQ+ representation until Parker's storyline with Kristina. Cameron believed that Kristina's "tumultuous relationship" with her professor altered the "landscape" of daytime TV "as a whole", and that the couple's initial kiss was "unexpected in the best way" due to it being "one of daytime TV's only instances of two women sharing a kiss". Cameron noted that he was sad when Parker initially left due to the pausing of her romantic storyline with Kristina, but believed that Parker's 2017 returned including the "best" and "worst" of their relationship. Cameron called Parker teaching at Kristina's university "awkward" but believed that fate helped bring the couple together. Speaking of the end of their relationship, Cameron wrote:

"If things worked out differently between Parker and Kristina, she likely never would've encountered Shiloh or joined his Dawn of Day cult. However, regardless of how things pan out between the couple, there's no denying the impact it's had on representation. For the first time, LGBTQIA+ viewers watching at home finally saw themselves on "General Hospital." It hasn't been done since, but once the door is open, it's a whole lot easier to walk through."
