= Holly Gagnier =

American actress

- Born: Los Angeles, California
- Occupations: Actress; Director; Screenwriter
- Years active: 1978–present
- Known for: Ivy Selejko Jannings (Days of Our Lives); Cassie Callison (One Life to Live)
- Children: 1

Holly Gagnier is an American actress.

== Early life ==
Gagnier was born in Los Angeles, California. Her parents were Hugh Gagnier, a cinematographer and Eleanor Gagnier, a stenographer for the United Nations. Eleanor served as a stenographer on the Nuremberg trials. Gagnier is one of five siblings.

== Career ==
A former actress, Gagnier's notable roles include long running stints on daytime's One Life to Live, Days of Our Lives in the role of young teen mother Ivy Jannings, and on General Hospital as the insane Jennifer Smith. While on One Life to Live, she appeared on the Oprah Winfrey Show as one of daytime's most popular characters. She was a series regular on Baywatch, and had recurring roles on television series Pacific Blue, Middle Ages, and as a young teen on House Calls opposite Lynn Redgrave. She had roles on Scandal, Private Practice, House, Perception, Friends (as one of Joey's sisters), ER, Dream On, and Ringer. She performed in theater productions both in New York City and Los Angeles, including in "God of Carnage" and "Yellow Face," as well as Christopher Durang's "Beyond Therapy". Gagnier completed the Hallmark movie Kiss on Candy Cane Lane and The Stalker Club for Lifetime with fellow soap vet Maeve Quinlan. On the big screen, she made her debut in New World Pictures'cult classic Girls Just Want to Have Fun, Gun, Son of an Afghan Farmer, the cult film Free Enterprise, The Undertaker's Wedding, and Breakout. She appears in Reckless Juliets on Amazon.

Gagnier finished the pilot "A Family Affair" opposite Pete Gardner, as well as on Brat's YouTube show Chicken Girls and Baby Doll Records as the evil Robin Robbins, where she completed Season 3.

== Filmography ==
=== Film ===
Year	Title	Role	Notes
1984	Gimme an 'F'	Dancer	
1985	Girls Just Want to Have Fun	Natalie Sands	
1991	Alligator II: The Mutation	Sheri Anderson	
1991	The Last Hero	Natasha	
1997	The Undertaker's Wedding	Louise	
1998	Breakout	Lynn Hadley	
1999	Free Enterprise	Laura Hafermann	
1999	Fashionably L.A.	Salesperson	

=== Television ===
Year	Title	Role	Notes
1980	Quincy, M.E.	Sherry	Episode: "The Winning Edge"
1980	ABC Afterschool Special	Ginny Coker	Episode: "The Gymnast"
1981	Fantasy Island	Janet Martin	Episode: "High Off the Hog / Reprisal"
1981	The Facts of Life	Helen	Episode: "Sex Symbol"
1982	Mr. Merlin	Guest Star	Episode: "I Was a Teenage Loser"
1982	T.J. Hooker	Tammy Spencer	Episode: "Big Foot"
1985–1987	Days of Our Lives	Ivy Selejko Jannings	139 episodes
1985	The A-Team	Tina	Episode: "Champ!"
1985	Charles in Charge	Susan	Episode: "Charles' Spring Break (A.K.A.: The Last Resort)"
1986–1988	One Life to Live	Cassie Callison	4 episodes
1989–1990	Baywatch	Gina Pomeroy	11 episodes
1990	Murder, She Wrote	Lindsay Barlow	Episode: "The Great Twain Robbery"
1991	Going Places	Pam Stone	Episode: "The Camping Show"
1991	The Hogan Family	Elizabeth	Episode: "A Family Affair"
1992	The New Lassie	Amelia	Episode: "Twin Pekes (aka 'Justice')"
1992	Silk Stalkings	Vicky Stone/Victoria	Episode: "Lady Luck"
1992	Bodies of Evidence	Dr. Michelle Robbins	Episode: "Whispers of the Dead"
1992	Middle Ages	Guest Star	Episode: "Pygmalian in the Python"
1993	Wings	Pam Chase	Episode: "Terminal Jealousy"
1994	Kung Fu: The Legend Continues	Maia	Episode: "Tournament"
1994	Dream On	Sally	Episode: "The Courtship of Martin's Father"
1994	ER	Tracy Young	Episode: "24 Hours"
1995	Platypus Man	Leah	Episode: "Lower East Side Story"
1995	seaQuest DSV	Rachel	Episode: "Smoke on the Water"
1996	Renegade	Karen Walker	Episode: "No Place Like Home"
1997	Friends	Mary Angela Tribbiani	Episode: "The One Where Chandler Can't Remember Which Sister"; uncredited
1997	Renegade	Guest star	Episode: "Knock Out"
1997	Brotherly Love	Guest star	Episode: "Art Attack"
1997	Spy Game	Velocity Rapture	Episode: "What, Micah Worry?"
1998	To Have & To Hold	Lisa	Episode: "Hope You Had the Time of Your Wife"
1998–2000	Pacific Blue	Lt. Susan Jessup	5 episodes
2001	Dharma & Greg	Voice of Tina	Episode: "Papa Was Almost a Rolling Stone"
2003	The Division	Guest star	Episode: "Body Double"
2004	Crossing Jordan	Jennifer Robinson	Episode: "Devil May Care"
2009	90210	Aunt Nancy	Episode: "The Party's Over"
2009	House	Michelle Berkley	Episode: "Known Unknowns"
2012	Ringer	Nurse	Episode: "I'm the Good Twin"
2013	Perception	Angie	Episode: "Neuropositive"
2015–2022	General Hospital	Jennifer Smith	11 episodes
2025	Venice: The Series	Elizabeth Winters	4 episodes

=== Video Game ===
Year	Title	Role	Notes
1996	Wing Commander IV: The Price of Freedom	1st Lieutenant Velina Sosa	
