= Jay Bontatibus =

American actor

Jay Bontatibus (July 31, 1964 – February 12, 2017) was an American actor.

He was born and raised in Cheshire, Connecticut. He was active in sports at Cheshire High School and at Central Connecticut State University. While at the latter, he also developed an interest in acting.

In 1998, Bontatibus joined the cast of The Young and the Restless, in the role of Tony Viscardi; he departed the cast in 2000. He also played Andy Capelli in General Hospital (2002-2004) and Rob McCullough in Days of Our Lives (2008).

He was also married to the soap's then-casting director, Marnie Saitta, from 2002 to 2005.

Bontatibus died at the age of 52 on February 12, 2017, following a battle with cancer.

== Filmography ==
=== Film ===
Year	Title	Role	Notes
1994	Heavy Blow	Unknown	Short film
2004	I Love You Came Too Late	Scott Donovan	Feature film
2005	Laws of Gambling	Joey	Short film
2007	Laws of the Underworld	Johnny	Feature film
2008	Officer Down	Vincent	Short film

=== Television ===
Year	Title	Role	Notes
1996	Another World	Russell Boyd	Episode: #8194
1998-2000	The Young and the Restless	Tony Viscardi	Daytime serial (recurring role @ 95 episodes)
2001	Sabrina the Teenage Witch	Vic Pulaski	Episode: "Sabrina's New Roommate"
2001	Walker, Texas Ranger	Michael Viscardi	Episode: "Legends"
2001	Port Charles	Detective Andy Capelli	Daytime serial (recurring role @ 18 episodes)
2002	V.I.P.	Mase (uncredited)	Episode: "48 1/2 Hours"
2002–2003	General Hospital	Detective Andy Capelli	Daytime serial (recurring role @ 38 episodes)
2004	CSI: Miami	Mr. Muscles	Episode: "Schadenfreude"
2005	Cold Case	Mike (1982)	Episode: "Legal"
2007	Drake & Josh	Nick	Episode: "Really Big Shrimp"
2008	Days of Our Lives	Rob McCullough	Daytime serial (recurring role @ 8 episodes)
