= Mitch Longley =

American actor (born 1965)

- Born: Mitchell Longley; 23 June 1965 (age 60); Cleveland, Ohio U.S.
- Occupation: Actor
- Years active: 1991–present

Mitch Longley (born June 23, 1965) is an American actor. He is known for his role of Matt Harmon on the soap opera Port Charles (1997–2000).

== Early life ==
Mitch Longley was born in Cleveland, Ohio to John and Betty, a Food Services Executive and a Surgical Nurse. He was the second child born to the family, having an older brother named Matthew. At the age of 5, his family relocated to Rowayton, Connecticut. He performed in local plays, acting and singing. He was a student at Brien McMahon High School and was involved in various after-school programs and athletics including band. He became an avid tennis player, and his passion for this sport continues to the present day.

== Career ==
Longley attended college at Northeastern University in Boston, Massachusetts. He majored in Speech Communications with a minor in Philosophy. During his college years, he gave talks at several colleges in Boston regarding disability-related issues, and sang in the Northeastern University choir. He completed internships through Northeastern, such as working with disabled children in San Francisco.

After graduating in 1989, Longley returned to his hometown in Norwalk, Connecticut. In 1990, through a friend, he met the famed fashion photographer Bruce Weber. Longley subsequently met designer Ralph Lauren, who hired him as a fashion model in his ad campaigns.

A director of the daytime soap opera Another World noticed Longley's modeling shots in fashion magazines, and she was interested. In 1991, he was hired for his first professional acting job, young attorney, Byron Pierce. His personality and looks, including his long flowing mane of hair, were a hit with the fans of Another World. Longley stayed at the soap for a year and then left of his own accord.

For a while, he spent his time traveling. In December 1993, he permanently relocated to Southern California to pursue his acting dreams.

=== Primetime roles ===
Longley has appeared in several television roles since his debut in 1995.

- 'Til Death - Joe (2009)
- Desperate Housewives - Dominick (2008)
- Las Vegas - Mitch Sassen (2003–2008)
- Weeds - Murderball Ref (2007)
- Shark - Mickey Strong (2007)
- Bones - Hank Lutrell (2006)
- Joan of Arcadia - Barry 'The Bear' Caldwell (2003–2004)
- Judging Amy - Jonathan Ashworth (2001–2002)
- The Burning Zone - Van Driver (1996)
- Vanishing Son - Justin Hessling (1995)

=== Soap opera roles ===
Longley has appeared in several soap opera roles since his debut in 1991.

- Port Charles - Dr. Matthew 'Matt' Harmon (1997–2000)
- General Hospital - Dr. Matthew 'Matt' Harmon (1997–1999)
- Another World - Byron Pierce (1991–1992)

== Awards and nominations ==
- Soap Opera Digest Award nominee, Favorite New Character (1998)

== Personal life ==
On March 13, 1983, after attending a senior class party, Longley was involved in a serious car accident. He fell asleep at the wheel of his car a few blocks from home, wrecking his car by plowing into a wall. He was 17 1/2 years old when he learned he had a spinal cord injury and would be a paraplegic. While in rehabilitation, he graduated from high school and walked with the aid of braces on graduation day, accepting his diploma. Since the accident, Longley has used a wheelchair due to the accident, which left him paralyzed from the waist down.

Longley is a Passamaquoddy and Penobscot Native American.

He has dark brown eyes and salt and pepper hair.

He is the founder of the non-profit organization Spirit of the Wounded Horse, Inc., which helps underprivileged Native Americans with physical disabilities.

Longley was voted Friendliest, Best Looking, and Nicest Smile, during his high school years.

In 1997, Longley was named one of Daytime's Most Fascinating People by Soap Opera Magazine.

Longley plays on the wheelchair tennis tournament circuit.

== Quotes ==
- My disability is a huge thing to some people, but to me it's just a personal characteristic like hair color. I'm hoping that in a few years, it won't even be an issue for me as an actor because it will be so commonplace.
- I wanted to be an actor since I was a child, and my injury didn't change that.
